= Ann Pasternak Slater =

British scholar and translator (born 1944)

Dr Ann Pasternak Slater (born 3 August 1944) is an English literary scholar and translator who was formerly a Fellow and Tutor at St Anne's College, Oxford.

Ann Pasternak Slater is the daughter of Lydia Pasternak Slater (1902–1989), chemist, translator and poet who was the youngest sister of the poet, translator, and novelist Boris Pasternak (1890–1960), by her marriage to the British psychiatrist Eliot Slater (1904–1983). Her grandfather, the Russian Impressionist painter Leonid Pasternak, was a friend of Tolstoy's and illustrator for the novel Resurrection and several of Tolstoy's other works.

Pasternak Slater was educated at the Oxford High School for Girls in North Oxford. She joined St Anne's College, Oxford in 1976 and became the Hazel Eardley-Wilmot Fellow in English there.

Pasternak Slater has written many books. She is involved with the Evelyn Waugh Society. She has written and lectured on her uncle Boris Pasternak's translations into Russian of Shakespeare plays. She has translated A Vanished Present, the memoirs of her uncle Alexander Pasternak (1893–1982), an architect, as well as Leo Tolstoy's The Death of Ivan Ilyich and Master and Man. She prepared the fourth edition of the Everyman complete English works of George Herbert, revising the edition of C. A. Patrides.

Ann Pasternak Slater is married to Craig Raine, an English poet and a Fellow of New College, Oxford, and they have four children. She retired in 2009.

== Bibliography ==
- Tolstoy, Leo. (2003). The Death of Ivan Ilyich and Master and Man (Ann Pasternak Slater, Trans.). New York: The Modern Library.
