= The Last Summer (novella) =

The Last Summer is a novella by the Russian writer Boris Pasternak. Originally published in 1934 under the Russian title Povest (A Story), the book relates the reminiscences of Serezha, a young Muscovite spending the winter of 1915-16 with his sister's family in the foothills of the Ural Mountains. Serezha's flashbacks to the summer of 1914, when he worked as a tutor in the house of a wealthy Moscow merchant and associated with various women, form the bulk of the novella. The book was translated into English by George Reavey and was first published in English in Cecil Hemley's magazine in book form Noonday in its first, 1958 issue, then by Peter Owen Publishers in 1959, before being reprinted in the Penguin Modern Classics series in 1960. The introduction was written by Pasternak's sister Lydia Slater.
