= Muchkapsky =

Muchkapsky (masculine), Muchkapskaya (feminine), or Muchkapskoye (neuter) may refer to:

- Muchkapsky District, a district of Tambov Oblast, Russia
- Muchkapsky (urban locality), an urban locality (a work settlement) in Tambov Oblast, Russia
