= Surkov =

Surkov (Russian: Сурков) is a Russian masculine surname, its feminine counterpart is Surkova. It may refer to

- Alexey Surkov (1899–1983), Russian poet
- Artem Surkov (born 1993), Russian wrestler
- Mikhail Surkov (1921–1953), Soviet sniper during World War II
- Nikita Surkov (born 1987), Russian football player
- Vladislav Surkov (born 1964), Russian businessman and political strategist
- Yevgeny Surkov (1915—1988), Soviet and Russian literary, theater and film critic
- Yuri A. Surkov (1926-2005), Russian scientist
- Arina Surkova (born 1998), Russian swimmer

== See also ==
- 5455 Surkov (1978 RV5), a main-belt asteroid
