= Lydia Pasternak Slater =

Russian chemist, poet and translator

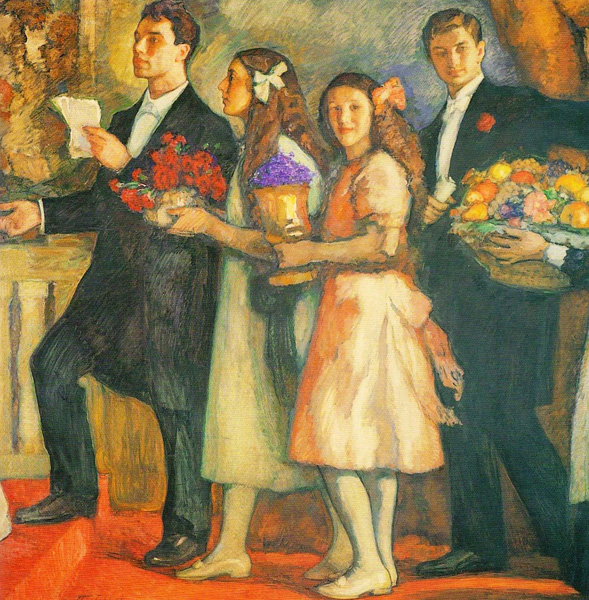
Boris, Josephine, Lydia and Alexander Pasternak in 1914

Lydia Leonidovna Pasternak (Russian: Лидия Леонидовна Пастернак; March 8, 1902 – May 4, 1989), married name Lydia Pasternak Slater, was a Soviet research chemist, poet and translator.

== Life ==
Lydia Pasternak was born in Moscow, then the second most important city of the Russian Empire, the daughter of the Russian impressionist painter Leonid Pasternak and of Rozalia Isodorovna Kofman, a concert pianist. She was the sister of the poet and novelist Boris Pasternak, the author of Doctor Zhivago, and of the architect Alexander Pasternak.

Lydia Pasternak began to study medicine at the Second Moscow University, but changed to chemistry, physics and botany. She continued her academic career in Berlin, after most of the Pasternak family had migrated to Germany as a result of the October Revolution, and received a doctoral degree in chemistry in 1926. Her first career was as a chemist, and in 1928 she joined the German Research Institute for Psychiatry (Deutsche Forschungsanstalt für Psychiatrie), a Kaiser Wilhelm Society institute in Munich, where she was an assistant to Irvine H. Page. Together they studied the influence of chemical substances on the brain and published several articles on their results in the journal Biochemische Zeitschrift. Lydia Pasternak left the group in 1935 as the Nazis came to power.

Pasternak sought exile in Britain, joining Eliot Trevor Oakeshott Slater, a psychiatrist she had met in Munich. The two married later in 1935 and settled in Oxford, where they were joined by Lydia's parents, then by her sister Josephine and her family. They had two sons and two daughters, including Ann Pasternak Slater, before divorcing in 1946. Her new family responsibilities meant that Lydia Pasternak could not continue her work in biochemistry, but she went on to become a published poet in German, Russian, and English, and she translated the poems of her brother Boris, winner of the Nobel Prize in Literature for 1958, into English.

Lydia Pasternak Slater continued to live in Park Town, North Oxford, until her death in 1989. As the years went by, she was increasingly able to make visits to her native Russia to visit friends and relations there, although her brother Boris was never allowed to visit his family in England.

== Selected publications ==
- Boris Pasternak: Fifty Poems, translated by Lydia Pasternak Slater (London: Unwin Books, 1963); reissued as Poems of Boris Pasternak, translated by Lydia Pasternak Slater (London: Unwin Paperbacks, 1984)
- Before Sunrise: poems (London: Mitre Press, 1971)
- Contemporary Russian poems, chosen and translated by Lydia Pasternak Slater. (Bakewell: Hub Publications, 1973)
- Vspyshki magniia: poėziia ("Flashes of Magnesium : poems") (Geneva: Poésie Vivante, 1974)
- 'Texts on Óndra Łysohorsky', translations (with Ewald Osers & Hugh McKinley) in Keith Armstrong, David Gill, eds.,The Informer international poetry magazine (Oxford, 1968)
- Lydia Pasternak Slater: Writings 1918–1989: Collected Verse, Prose and Translations (Russian Culture in Europe) (London: Peter Lang, 2015)
- Articles in Biochemie [Journal of Biochemistry] 1931–1935

== Recordings ==
- Boris Pasternak – Poems (Lyro Record Company – LYR 1, 7" vinyl, released 1960: seven poems translated and read by Lydia Pasternak Slater)
- Boris Pasternak – Poems (Lyro Record Company – LYR 2, 7" vinyl, released 1960: five more poems translated and read by Lydia Pasternak Slater}

== Sources ==
- Women scientists in Kaiser Wilhelm Institutes, from A to Z (Berlin: 1999, 107–109)
- Page, Irvine H. “The rebirth of neurochemistry” in Modern Medicine (March 19, 1962: 81)
- Nicolas Pasternak Slater, Boris Pasternak: Family Correspondence, 1921-1960 (2012)
