= Nikita Surkov =

Russian footballer

Personal information
- Full name: Nikita Vladimirovich Surkov
- Date of birth: 11 August 1987 (age 39)
- Place of birth: Leningrad, USSR
- Height: 1.78 m (5 ft 10 in)
- Positions: Defender; midfielder

Team information
- Current team: FC Chayka Peschanokopskoye (assistant coach)

Youth career
- 1993–2002: Spartak Moscow
- 2003–2004: Krasny Oktyabr Moscow
- 2005–2006: Smena Moscow

Senior career*
Years	Team	Apps	(Gls)
2006–2009	FC Gazovik Orenburg	29	(0)
2009	FC Nara-ShBFR Naro-Fominsk	13	(0)
2010	FC Dynamo Saint Petersburg	8	(0)
2011–2013	FC Petrotrest Saint Petersburg	75	(5)
2013	FC Dynamo Saint Petersburg	22	(0)
2014–2015	FC Sokol Saratov	27	(0)
2015–2017	FC Neftekhimik Nizhnekamsk	52	(2)
2017–2020	FC Sakhalin Yuzhno-Sakhalinsk	50	(1)
2021	FC Sakhalin Yuzhno-Sakhalinsk	3	(0)
2021–2022	FC Sakhalinets Moscow (amateur)		
2022–2023	FC Sakhalinets Moscow	11	(0)

Managerial career
- 2022: FC Sakhalinets Moscow (assistant)
- 2023–2024: FC Rodina-M Moscow (assistant)
- 2024–2025: FC Rodina-2 Moscow (assistant)
- 2025–: FC Chayka Peschanokopskoye (assistant)
- * Club domestic league appearances and goals

Nikita Vladimirovich Surkov (Russian: Никита Владимирович Сурков; born 11 August 1987) is a Russian professional football coach and a former player. He is an assistant coach with FC Chayka Peschanokopskoye.

== Career ==
At 6 years old, Surkov was accepted to "Spartak" football school, where he studied from 1993 to 2002. In 2007, he was invited to the training camp in FC Gazovik Orenburg, then signed a one-year contract with the club. A year later, the contract was extended for another few seasons.

In 2009, he joined football team second division zone "West" - FC Nara-ShBFR Naro-Fominsk. In 2010 he signed with FC Dynamo Saint Petersburg in the Russian Football National League, which became FC Petrotrest Saint Petersburg in 2011 and then reverted to Dynamo Saint Petersburg a few years later.

In 2014, Surkov joined FC Sokol Saratov.

== Awards ==
=== Individual ===
Best defender of Russia, zone West D-2 (2011/2012)
