= Leonid Pasternak =

Russian artist (1862–1945)

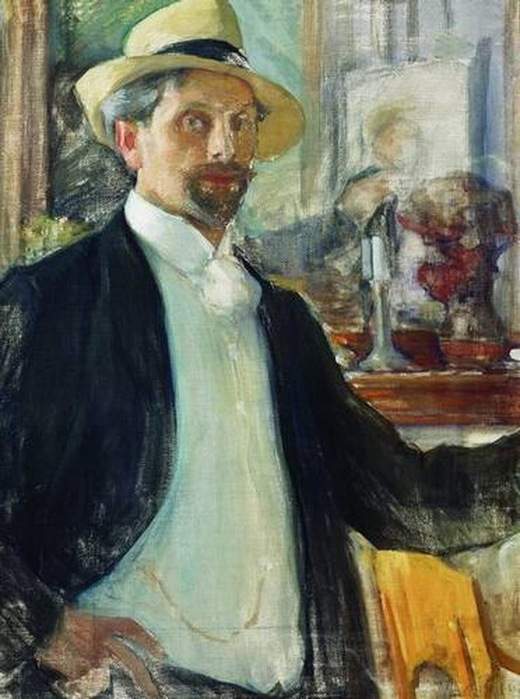
Self-portrait (1908)

Leonid Osipovich Pasternak (Russian: Леонид Осипович Пастернак; born Yitzhok-Leib or Isaak Iosifovich Pasternak; 3 April [O.S. 22 March] 1862 – 31 May 1945) was a Russian painter. He was the father of the poet and novelist Boris Pasternak.

== Biography ==
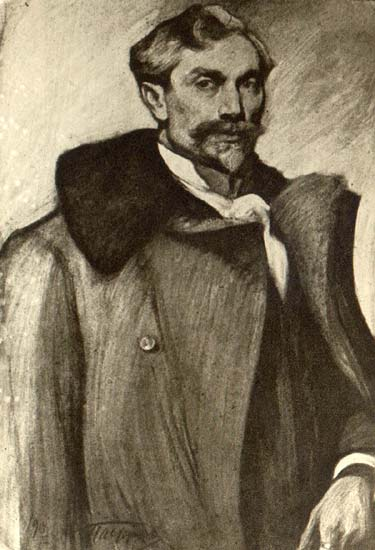
Self-portrait (before 1916)

Pasternak was born in Odessa to an Orthodox Jewish family on 3 April 1862. The family claimed to be distantly descended, in one line, from Isaac Abrabanel, the 15th-century Jewish philosopher and treasurer of Portugal, although no independent evidence of this exists. Leonid's father made an income by renting out a guest house. The courtyard of the guest house, with its adjoining coach-house, first awakened Leonid's artistic imagination. He was the youngest of six children.

He started to draw very early, but his family tried to discourage him, as they feared that his drawing would interfere with his studies. His first sponsor was the local street cleaner who began buying Pasternak's art when Leonid was seven years old. During 1879–1881 Leonid Pasternak was a student at the Grekov Odessa Art School.

From 1881 to 1885, Pasternak studied at Moscow University, first in the Department of Medicine, then in the Department of Law. Eventually he decided to devote his life to art and entered the Royal Academy of Fine Arts in Munich, from which he graduated in 1887. He returned to Russia, served the compulsory two years in the Imperial Russian Army in an artillery regiment, and in 1889 started a career as a full-time painter.

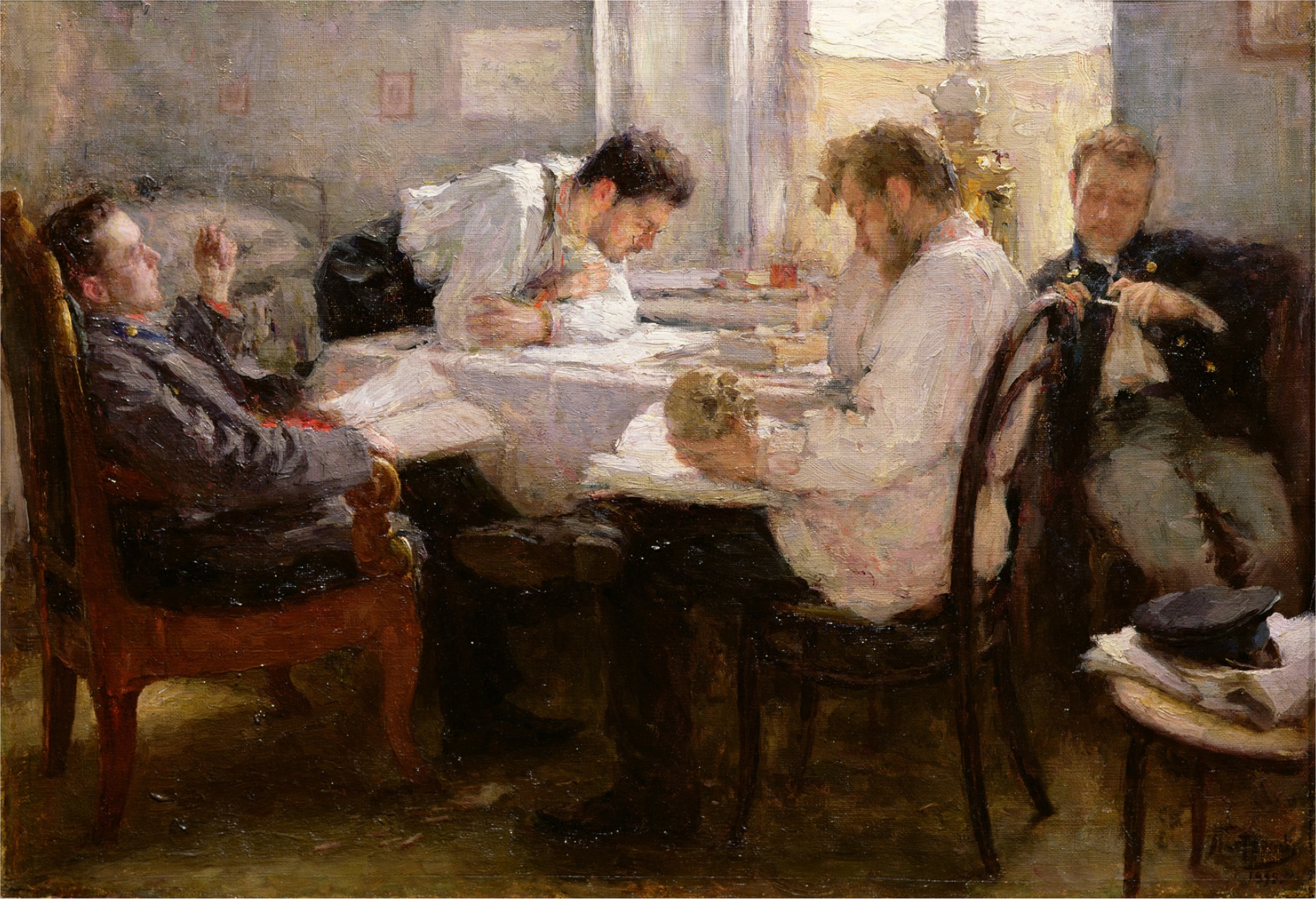
Night Before the Exam, 1895, oil on canvas; Musée d'Orsay, Paris, purchased from the 1900 Paris Exposition.

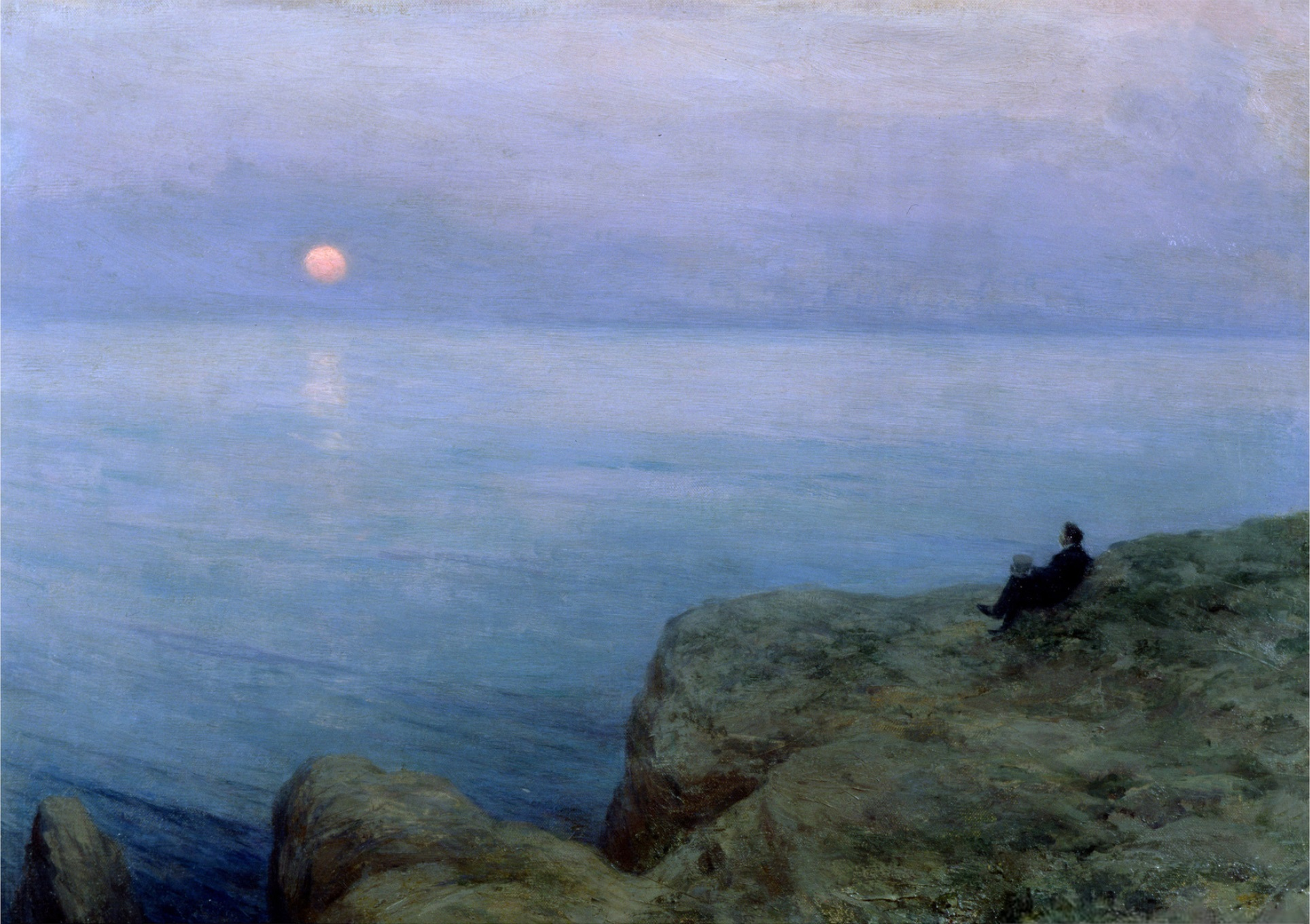
Alexander Pushkin at the seashore

The start of his career was very successful. His first exhibited painting was bought by Pavel Tretyakov, the most important art sponsor in Russia of the time. He soon became a popular painter, a member of the so-called Polenov circle, which included Valentin Serov, Isaac Levitan, Mikhail Nesterov, and Konstantin Korovin. In 1889 he married the pianist Rosa Isidorovna Kaufman, the daughter of Isidor Kaufman, a well-to-do Jewish industrialist. The newlyweds settled in Moscow, and there (in 1890) the first of the couple's four children was born—the famous author and poet Boris Pasternak.

Leonid Pasternak was one of the first Russian painters who labeled himself an Impressionist. In Russia in the 1880s and 1890s such a proclamation was novel enough to draw attention to an artist. Leonid also was a member of the Peredvizhniki and Union of Russian Artists movements. He was a friend of Leo Tolstoy, for months lived in Yasnaya Polyana, and painted many portraits of the great writer, also illustrating his novels War and Peace and Resurrection. He received a medal at the World's fair in Paris for his illustrations of Tolstoy's novels.

== Career ==
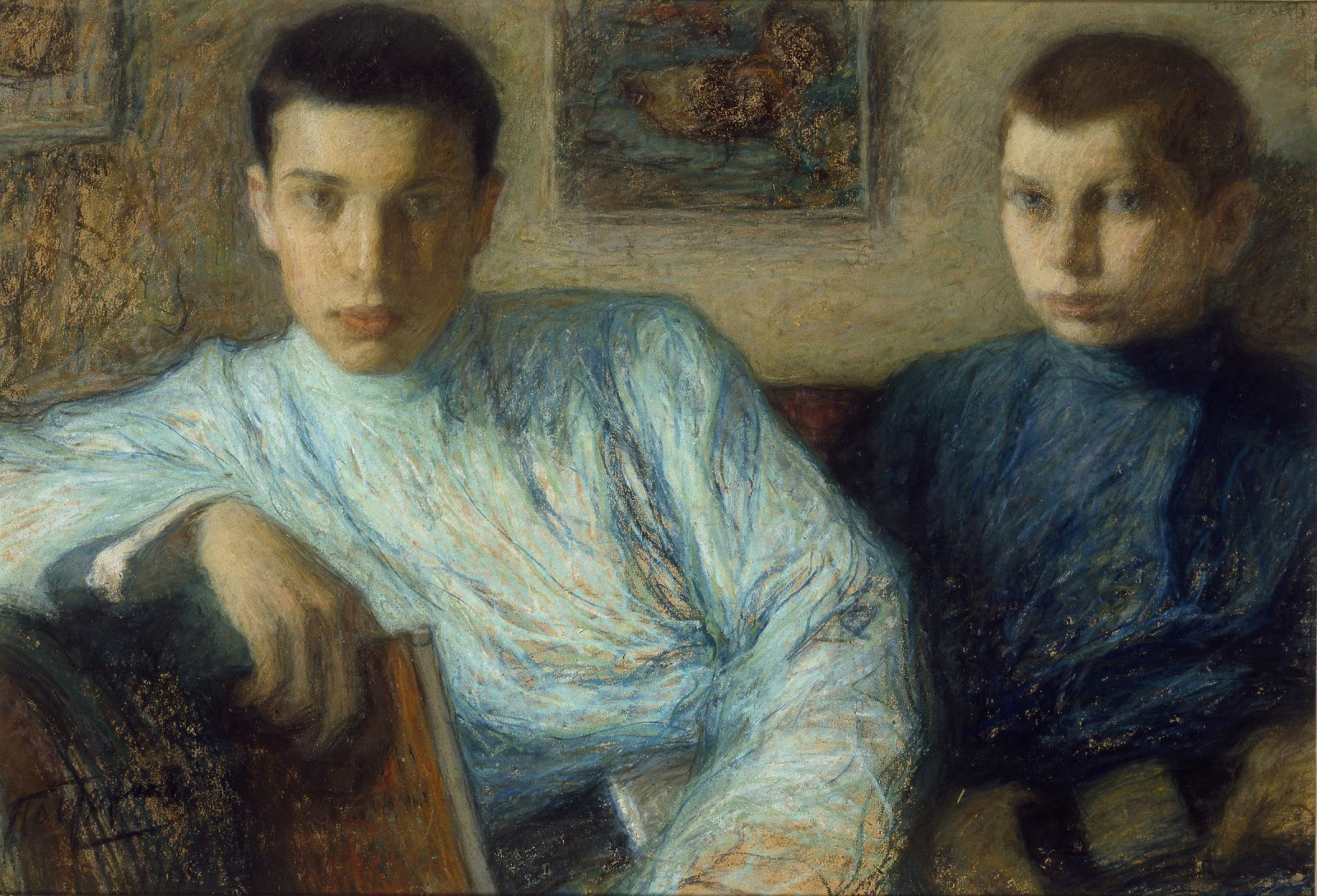
Leonid Pasternak's sons Boris (left) and Alexander (1900s)

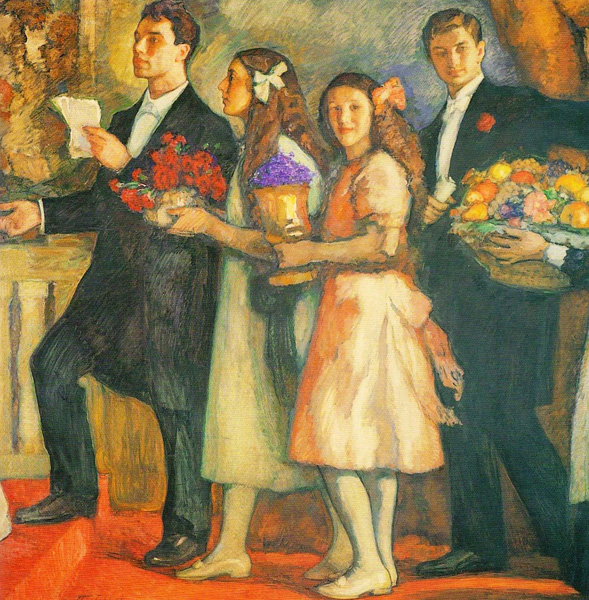
Leonid Pasternak's children (1914)

According to Pasternak's son Boris,

"It was from the... kitchen that my father's remarkable illustrations for Tolstoy's Resurrection were dispatched. After its final revision, the novel was serialized in the journal Niva by the Petersburg publisher Fyodor Marks. The work was feverish. I remember how pressed for time Father was. The issues of the journal came out regularly without delay. One had to be in time for each issue. Tolstoy kept back the proofs, revising them again and again. There was the risk that the illustrations would be at variance with the corrections subsequently introduced into it. But my father's sketches came from the same source whence the author obtained his observations, the courtroom, the transit prison, the country, the railway.

It was the reservoir of living details, the identical realistic presentation of ideas, that saved him from the danger of digressing from the spirit of the original. In view of the urgency of the matter, special precautions were taken to prevent any delay in the sending of the illustrations.

The services of the conductors of the express trains at the Nikolayevsky railway were enlisted. My childish imagination was struck by the sight of a train conductor in his formal railway uniform, standing waiting at the door of the kitchen as if he were standing on a railway platform at the door of a compartment that was just about to leave the station. Joiner's glue was boiling on the stove. The illustrations were hurriedly wiped dry, fixed, glued on pieces of cardboard, rolled up, tied up. The parcels, once ready, were sealed up with sealing wax and handed to the conductor."

He was awarded a medal at the World Fair in Paris (1900) for his illustrations of Tolstoy's novels.

Pasternak was elected a member of the Imperial Academy of Arts (1905), and also taught at the Moscow School of Painting, Sculpture and Architecture.

In 1921, Pasternak needed an eye surgery, which was scheduled to be performed in Berlin. He traveled there with his wife and two daughters, Lydia and Josephine, leaving his sons Boris and Alexander in Russia. After the surgery he decided not to return to Russia, remaining in Berlin until 1938 when he took refuge from the Nazis in Great Britain. In 1924, he painted a portrait of Albert Einstein (now in the Mathematics and Computer Science Library of the Hebrew University of Jerusalem). Leonid Pasternak died at Oxford on 31 May 1945.

== Works ==
Portraits

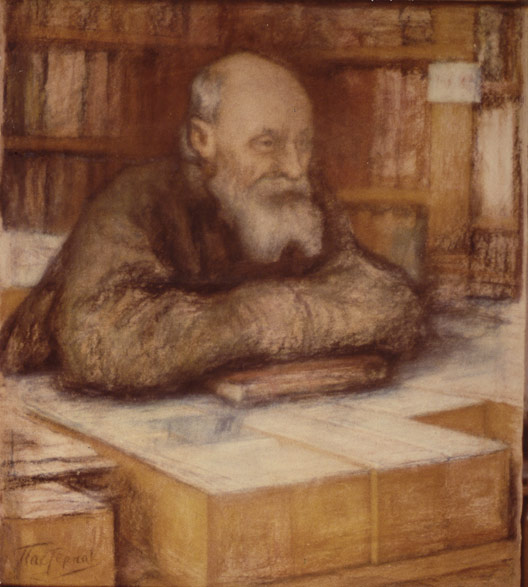
Nikolai Fyodorovich Fyodorov, pastel on paper

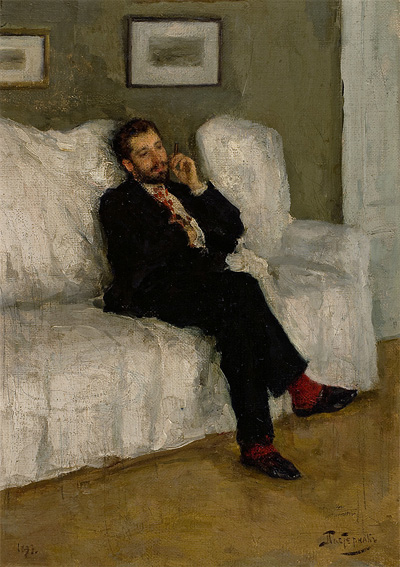
Dr. Ossip Kaufmann

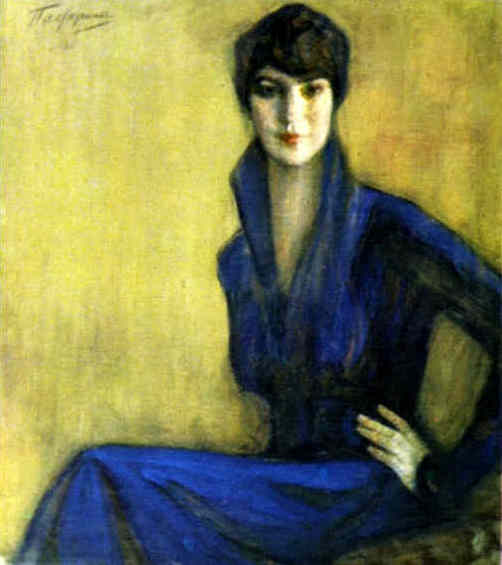
E. Levina, 1916, tempera and pastel on paper mounted on canvas

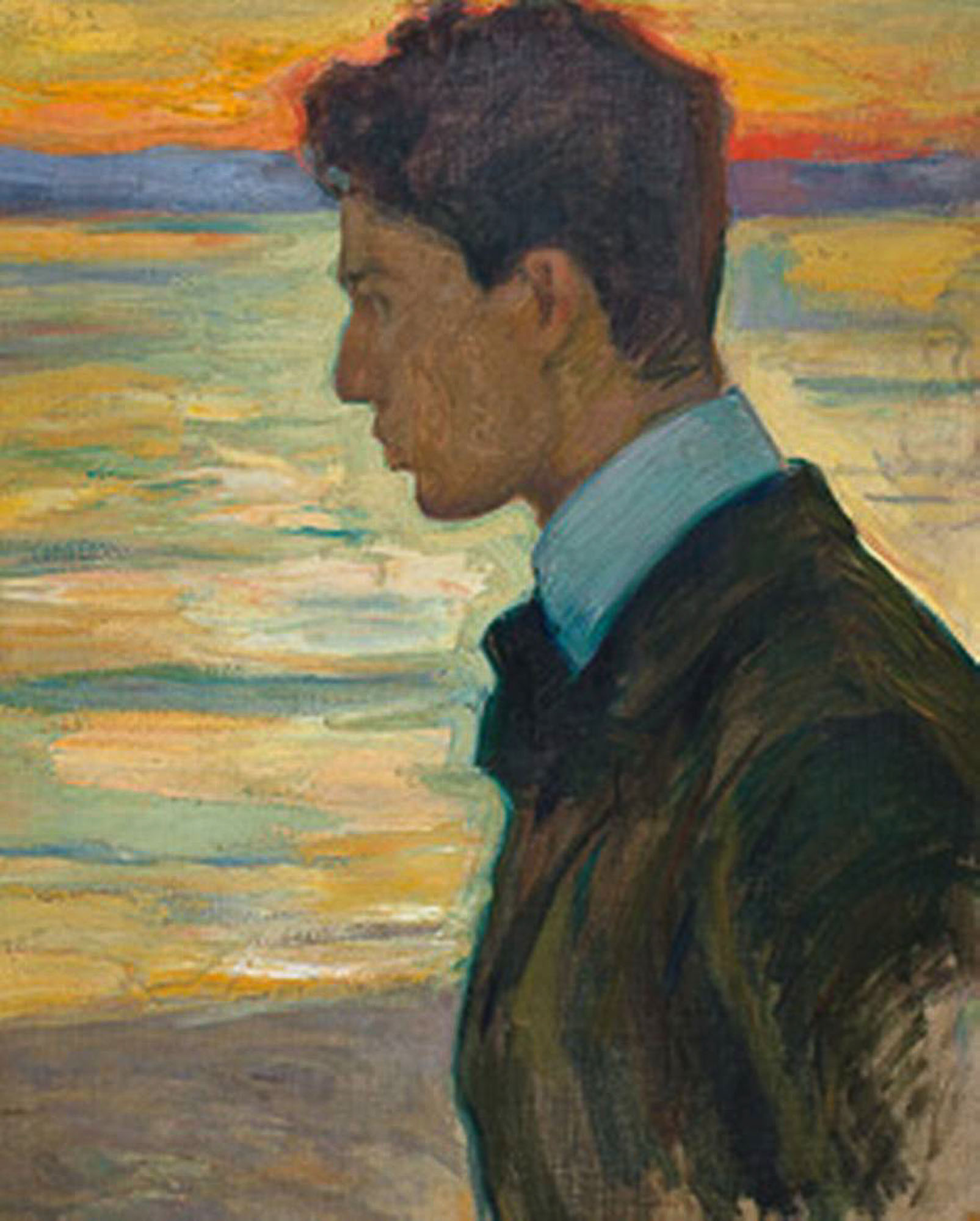
Boris Beside the Sea, 1910, oil on canvas

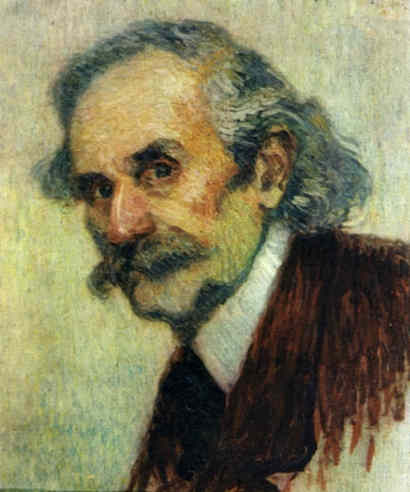
Conductor Vyacheslav Suk, 1898, oil on canvas

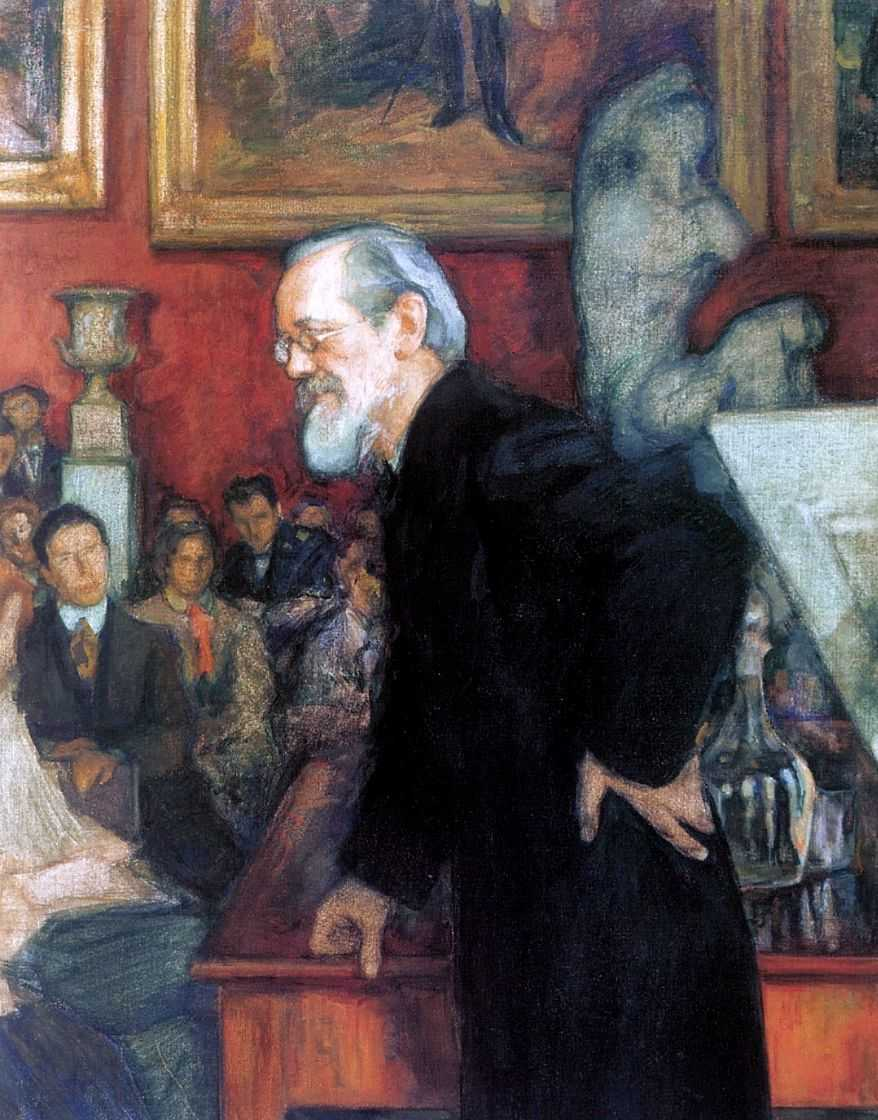
Vasily Klyuchevsky, 1909

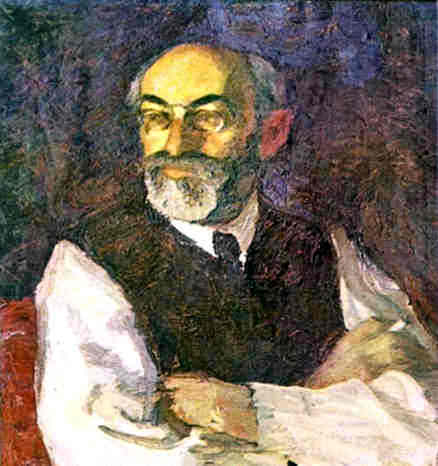
Mikhail Gershenzon, 1917, oil on canvas

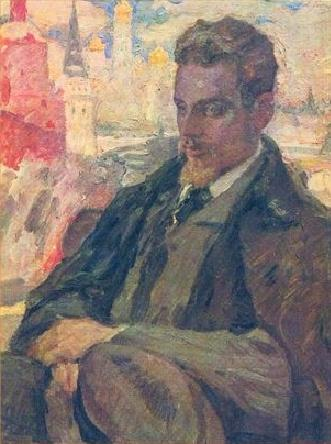
Rilke in Moscow, 1928

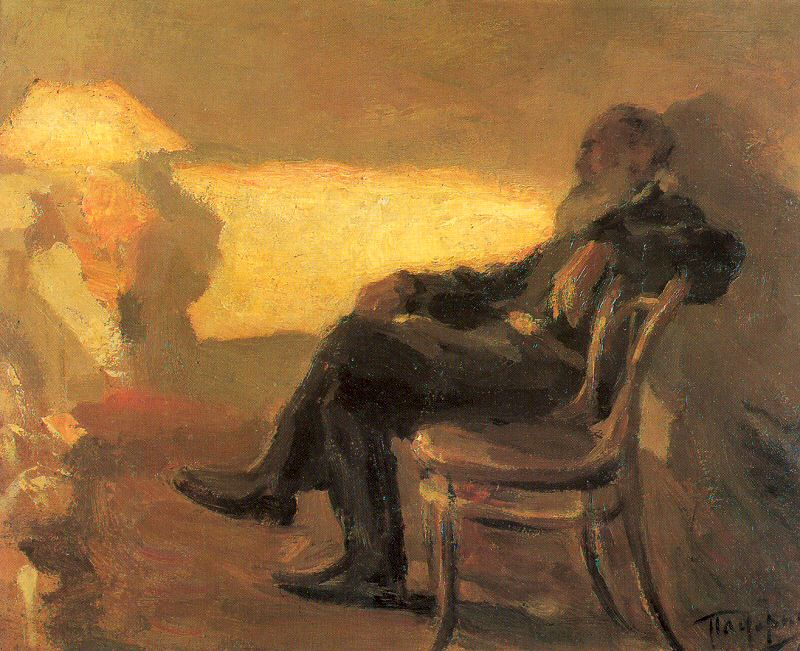
Leo Tolstoy

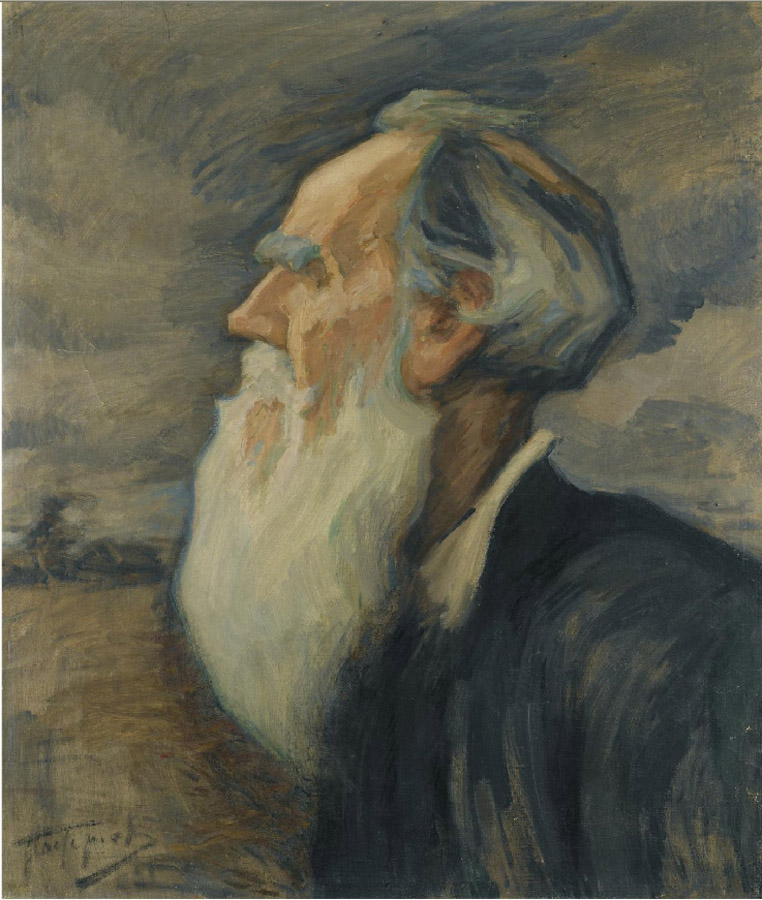
Leo Tolstoy, 1908

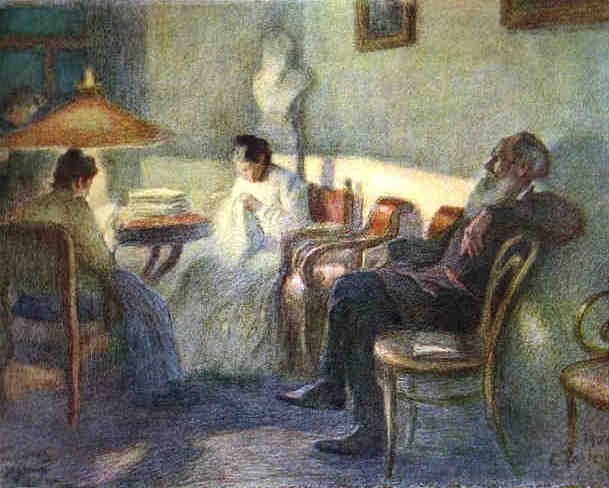
Under a Lamp (Leo Tolstoy in his Family Circle), 1902, pastel on paper

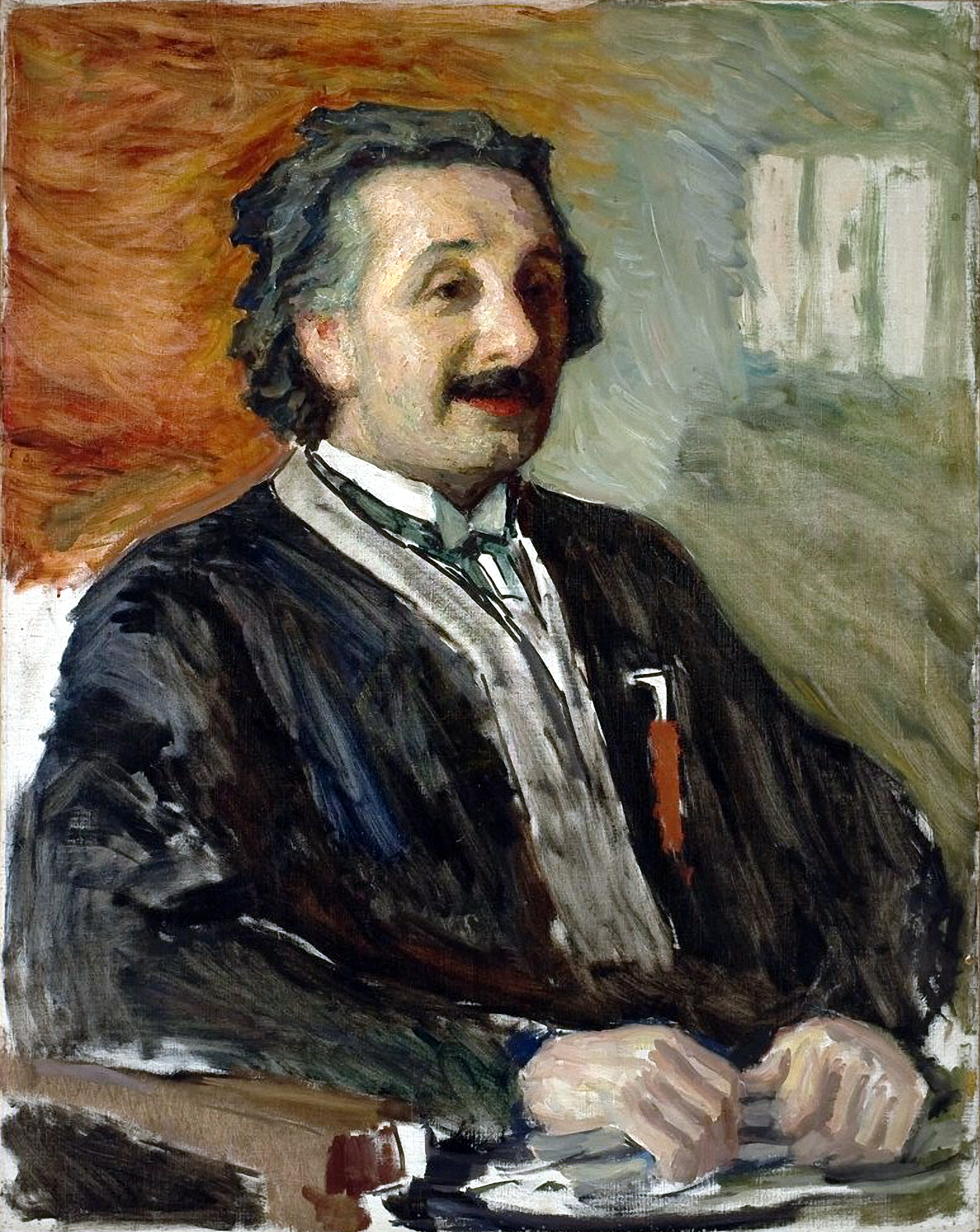
Albert Einstein, 1924, oil on canvas

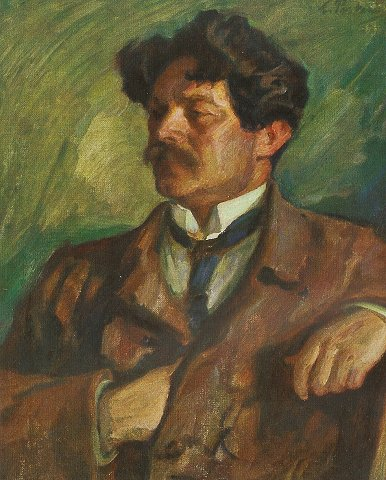
Shaul Tchernichovsky, 1928, oil on canvas
Landscapes and other

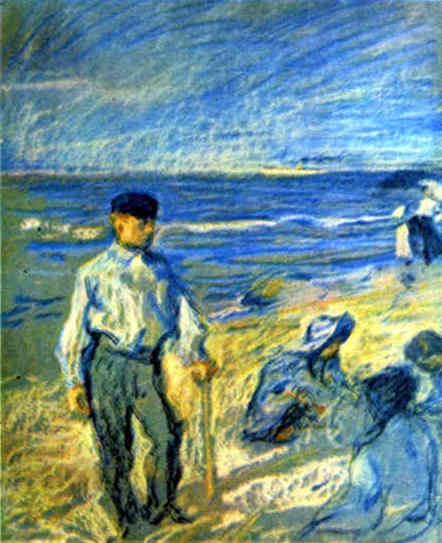
Island Rügen, 1906, pastel on paper

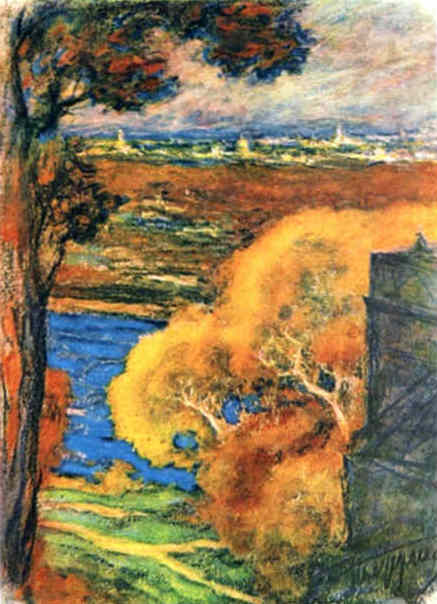
The Golden Autumn. (Vorobyovy Mountains in Moscow)

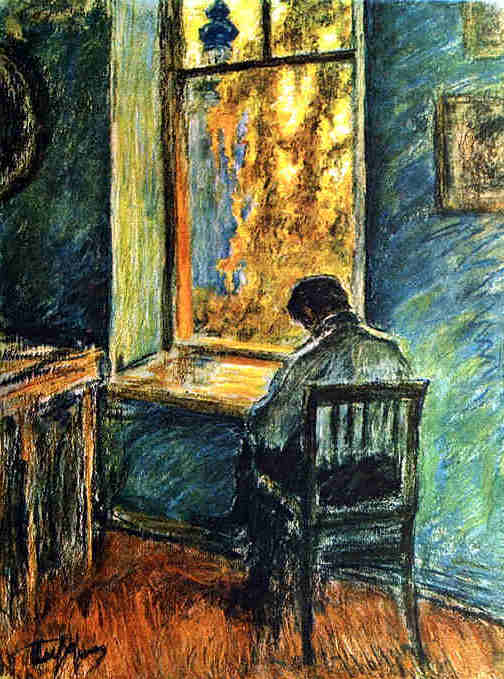
At the Window. Autumn, 1913, pastel on paper

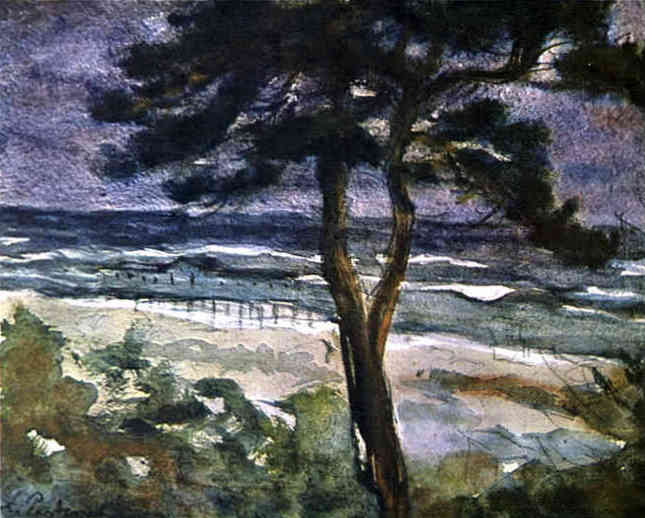
Pine-trees and the Sea, 1910, gouache on paper

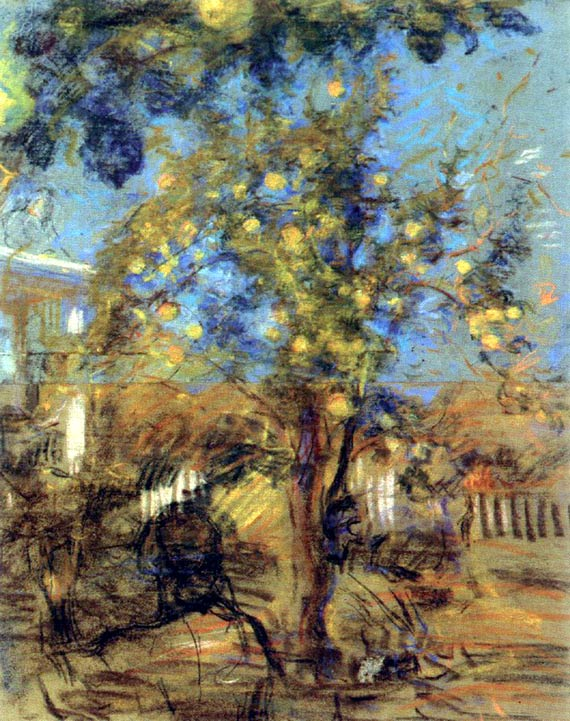
Collecting Apples, 1918, pastel on paper

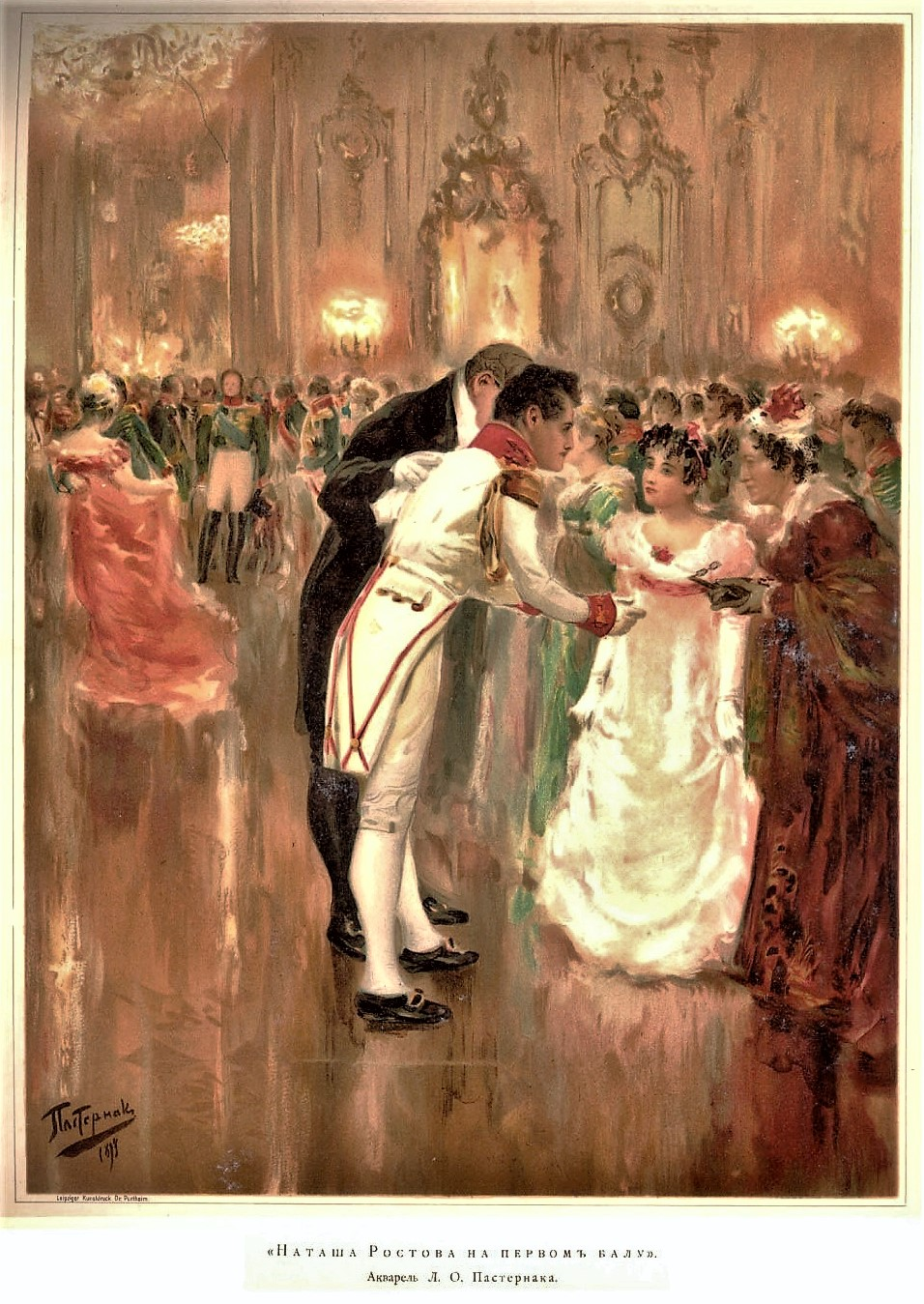
Natasha Rostova's First Ball, 1893, watercolor

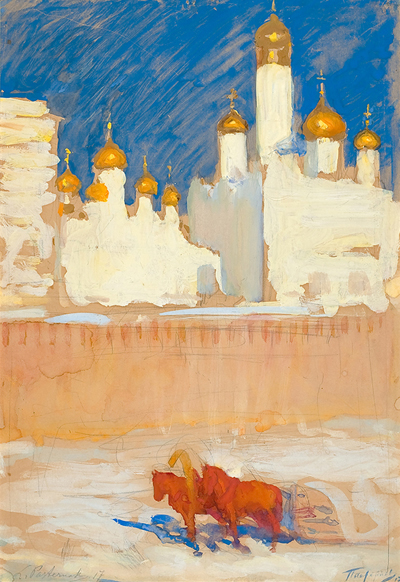
The Moscow Kremlin in the March Sun, 1917, gouache on paper

== Publications ==
- Pasternak, Leonid O. (1975). Pasternak, Josephine L.; Pasternak, Aleksandr L. (eds.). Записи разных лет (in Russian). Moscow: Sovetskiy Khudozhnik.
- Pasternak, Leonid O. (1982). Pasternak, Josephine L. (ed.). The Memoirs of Leonid Pasternak. Translated by Jennifer Bradshaw. London; New York: Quarter. ISBN 0-7043-2343-5. OCLC 1194441796.
