= Yuri A. Surkov =

Russian scientist (1926–2005)

Yuri Aleksandrovich Surkov
- Юрий Александрович Сурков
- Born: March 30, 1926; Saratov, USSR
- Died: November 4, 2005 (aged 79); Moscow, Russia
- Education: Moscow Engineering Physics Institute
- Occupation: Cosmochemist
- Employer(s): Vernadsky Institute of Geochemistry and Analytical Chemistry

Yuri Aleksandrovich Surkov (Russian: Юрий Александрович Сурков; 1926-2005) was a Russian experimental cosmochemist. He led the design, construction and operation of several instruments installed on spacecraft exploring the Moon, Venus and Mars, and performed laboratory analyses of lunar regolith samples.

== Biography ==
Sources differ regarding Surkov's place and date of birth, citing either Saratov on 30 March or Moscow on 31 March 1926. Following schooling and military service, during WW2 and continuing until 1947, Surkov enrolled in the Department of Nuclear Physics at the Moscow Mechanical Institute (known since 2009 as the National Research Nuclear University MEPhI); he passed the entrance exams in physics and mathematics and was admitted directly into the second year of study. In 1952, he graduated from MEPhI with a specialisation in the design and operation of physical instruments and installations, qualifying as a physicist-engineer; the topic of his graduation thesis was the construction of a Wilson cloud chamber.

After graduating from MEPhI, Surkov joined an expeditionary team from the Institute of Atomic Energy (IAE) heading to Mount Aragats in Armenia (home to the Byurakan Observatory). There, he conducted experiments to study the composition and properties of cosmic rays—and their interaction with complex nuclei—using a chamber he had designed himself.

While working at the institute, he gained access to the country's first charged-particle accelerator in Dubna. However, access was sporadic; irradiating a target for about an hour produced only short-lived isotopes that decayed within hours or days, and a scheduled target replacement would have halted the work of other researchers. Surkov took a risky step: he climbed through an access hatch into the chamber to install a new target—a small metal plate—while two radiation safety officers stood nearby, one with a stopwatch and the other with a dosimeter. This effort yielded results that led to the discovery of previously unknown atomic nuclei of medium atomic weight and allowed for the investigation of their radiation characteristics.

In the 1950s, at the request of A.P. Vinogradov, Kurchatov transferred two graduate students—Yu.A. Surkov and I.S. Dneprovsky—from the IAE to the Institute of Geochemistry, as the institute lacked its own specialists in nuclear physics.

In 1958, he defended his Candidate of Sciences dissertation at the Institute of Physical Chemistry and continued his work at the Laboratory of Planetary Research within the Institute of Geochemistry.

In the late 1950s and early 1960s, a cosmochemical approach to studying Solar System bodies was developed in the USSR under the leadership of Academician A. P. Vinogradov.

In 1961 Surkov was appointed Head of the Laboratory of Planetary Research at GEOKhI (Vernadsky Institute of Geochemistry and Analytical Chemistry); in 1978, he became the institute's Chief Designer.

In 1967 he was sent to the United States to share the results of the Soviet Union's lunar research with American scientists, in the frame of an agreement between the Academies of Sciences of the USSR and the USA regarding the exchange of scientific achievements in space exploration.

He defended his Doctor of Sciences dissertation in 1970 and was awarded the academic rank of professor in 1971.

Surkov spent the rest of his career at GEOKhI. He was a pioneer in experimental cosmochemistry, and was responsible for many instruments on Soviet/Russian Luna, Venus, Mars and Phobos missions. His instruments employed methods including physicochemical analysis, gamma-ray and X-ray fluorescence spectrometry (XRFS), neutron activation analysis and mass spectrometry. He also worked on laboratory analysis of samples returned from the Moon, and was project scientist for the first attempted planetary penetrators, on the Mars 96 mission. He authored over 300 scientific papers and four monographs on planetary exploration.

He was a member of the RAS Council on Space, Deputy Chairman of the Section for the Study of Solar System Bodies, a member of the international working group on penetrometry, a member of the editorial board of the journal Zemlya i Vselennaya (Earth and Universe), and a member of the RAS Scientific Council on Geochemistry.

In 1991, he was elected an Academician of the International Academy of Astronautics and the Russian Academy of Natural Sciences.

Notable mission involvements and instruments developed under Surkov's leadership include:

- Luna 10 and Luna 12: GS-10L gamma ray spectrometers
- Luna 16, Luna 20, Luna 24: laboratory analyses of lunar samples
- Venera 4, Venera 5,6: G-8 and G-10 chemical gas analysers
- Venera 7: GS-4 gamma ray spectrometer
- Mars 2,3 & 6,7 landers:
  - AAL-2, AAL-2M Automatic Activation Laboratory
  - Radiation densitometer on PrOP-M
- Venera 8:
  - GS-4 gamma ray spectrometer
  - IAV-72 ammonia detector
- Mars 5: GS-11M gamma ray spectrometer
- Venera 9,10:
  - GS-12V gamma ray spectrometer
  - RP-75 radiation densitometer
  - MAV-75 mass spectrometer
- Venera 11,12:
  - BDRA-1V chemical composition of aerosols by XRFS
  - VM-3 hygrometer
  - Arakhis BDRP-1V soil XRFS
- Venera 13,14:
  - BDRA-1V chemical composition of aerosols by XRFS
  - VM-3R hygrometer
  - Arakhis-2 / BDRP-2V soil XRFS
- VeGa 1,2:
  - Malakhit-V aerosol mass spectrometer
  - VM-4 hygrometer
  - GS-15-STsV gamma ray spectrometer
  - BDRP-AM25 soil XRFS
- Phobos 1,2:
  - GS-14 gamma ray spectrometer (on orbiters)
  - IPNM-3 neutron spectrometer (Phobos 2 only)
  - ARS-FP XRFS on PROP-F
- Mars 96:
  - Responsible scientist for penetrators
  - Photon gamma ray spectrometer
  - Neutron-S neutron spectrometer

Most of these space instruments functioned as intended, yielding results reported in the cited references, but some were impacted by loss of the mission as a whole (e.g. Mars 96) or by other spacecraft anomalies (en route or at the destination).

In the early 21st century, under his leadership, preparations began for scientific experiments to study the Moon and Phobos as part of the Phobos-Grunt and Luna-Glob projects.

He died on 4 November 2005, and was succeeded as head of GEOKhI's Laboratory of Lunar and Planetary Geochemistry by L.P. Moskaleva.

== Bibliography ==
- Surkov, Yu.A. (1977). Gamma-spektrometriya v Kosmicheskikh Issledovaniyakh Гамма-спектрометрия в Космических Исследованиях [Gamma-Ray Spectrometry in Space Research] (in Russian). Moscow: Atomizdat. Bibcode:1977MAtom.........S.
- Surkov, Yu.A. (1985). Kosmokhimicheskiye Issledovaniya Planet i Sputnikov Космохимические Исследования Планет и Спутников [Cosmochemical Studies of Planets and Satellites] (in Russian). Moscow: Nauka. Bibcode:1985MoIzN....R....S.
- Surkov, Yu.A. (1997). Exploration of Terrestrial Planets from Spacecraft: Instrumentation, Investigation, Interpretation. Wiley-Praxis Series in Astronomy & Astrophysics (2nd ed.). Chichester: Wiley-Praxis. ISBN 0-471-96429-8. Archived from the original on 10 May 2003.
- Surkov, Yu.A. (2004). Pervyye Shagi Kosmicheskoy Ery Первые Шаги Космической Эры [First Steps of the Space Age] (in Russian). Moscow: Nauka. ISBN 5-02-032841-3.

== Awards and honours ==
- Victory Medal (1945)
- Lenin Prize (as part of a team, 1970) — for the creation of the Venera 4, -5, and -6 spacecraft and the scientific research programme to determine the physical parameters and chemical composition of the atmosphere of Venus
- Order of the October Revolution (1975) — for contributions to the development of Soviet science and in connection with the 250th anniversary of the USSR Academy of Sciences
- USSR State Prize (1983) — for the creation and use of a system of instruments for exploring the planet's surface
- S.P. Korolev Medal "For Participation in Space Research" (1985)
- Order of the Red Banner of Labour (1986) — for achievements in fulfilling the 10th Five-Year Plan for the development of science and technology and the implementation of research results in the national economy of the USSR
- Yu.A. Gagarin Medal (1986)
- Honorary Citizen of Providence, Rhode Island, USA (1988) — for the development of international cooperation
- Honoured Worker of Science and Technology of the Russian SFSR (1989)
- P.L. Kapitsa Medal
- A.P. Vinogradov Prize (1999) — for the monograph Exploration of Terrestrial Planets from Spacecraft
