= Muchkapsky (urban locality) =

Muchkapsky Мучкапский
- Urban-type settlement
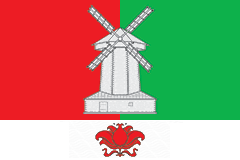
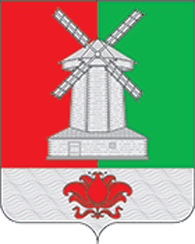
- Flag Coat of arms
- Interactive map of Muchkapsky
- Location of Muchkapsky Muchkapsky (Tambov Oblast)
- Coordinates: 51.8507°N 42.4825°E
- Country: Russia
- Federal subject: Tambov Oblast
- Administrative district: Muchkapsky District

Population (2010 Census)
  - Total: 7,080
  - Estimate (2021): 5,949 (−16%)
- Time zone: UTC+3 (MSK)
- Postal code: 393570
- OKTMO ID: 68618151051

Muchkapsky (Russian: Мучкапский) is a type of urban locality called an urban-type settlement in Muchkapsky District of Tambov Oblast, Russia. Population: 7,080 (2010 census); 8,050 (2002 census); 8,604 (1989 Soviet census).
