= Zhivago =

Zhivago may refer to:

== People ==
- Zhivago Duncan (born 1980), American artist
- Zhivago Groenewald (born 1993), Namibian cricketer
- Semen Zhivago (1807–1863), Russian painter
- Mr. Zivago (born 1961), Italian singer

== Arts and entertainment ==
=== Creative works ===
- Doctor Zhivago, the title of a novel by Boris Pasternak and its various adaptations
  - Doctor Zhivago (novel), a 1957 novel by Boris Pasternak
  - Doctor Zhivago (film), a 1965 film directed by David Lean with a screenplay by Robert Bolt
  - Doctor Zhivago (TV series), a 2002 British television series directed by Giacomo Campiotti with a teleplay by Andrew Davies
  - Doctor Zhivago (musical), a 2011 musical composed by Lucy Simon, lyrics by Michael Korie and Amy Powers, and book by Michael Weller
- Mademoiselle Zhivago, a 2010 album by Lara Fabian

=== Fictional characters ===
- Yuri Zhivago, the protagonist and title character of the novel Doctor Zhivago
- Zhivago, a character in the manga series The Seven Deadly Sins

== Other uses ==
- Zhivago shirt, a Russian folk shirt

== See also ==
- Kostyantyn Zhevago (born 1974), Ukrainian politician
- Zhi-Vago, a German dream trance music band
- Zhivargo Laing (born 1967), Bahamian politician
