= Anna Pasternak =

British Author

- Born: 1967 (age 58–59)
- Occupation: Writer
- Website: www.annapasternak.co.uk

Anna Pasternak (born June 1967) is a British author of books, articles, and spa reviews as well as being a frequent commentator on television and radio.

== Early life ==
Pasternak was born in 1967. She is the great-granddaughter of Leonid Pasternak, the impressionist painter, and the great-niece of Nobel Prize-winning novelist Boris Pasternak, author of Doctor Zhivago. Her father is the scientist Charles Pasternak and her first cousin once removed is the literary scholar Ann Pasternak Slater (niece of Boris Pasternak).

== Education ==
Christ Church, Oxford, St Paul’s Girls’ School.

== Career ==
Pasternak's bestselling book Princess in Love (1994) is a detailed reflection of her interviews with James Hewitt about his affair with Princess Diana.The Independent, said "The work has been widely panned for its breathless Mills and Boon style" and The Los Angeles Times said it "has few quotations and is written in the breathless style of romantic fiction, containing the supposed thoughts and feelings of Princess Diana" and Buckingham Palace called it "grubby and worthless." However, Diana later confirmed the affair and Pasternak was exonerated in the press when suddenly everything she had written was confirmed to be true. In 1996 the book was made into a television film.

Pasternak's 1998 novel, More Than Money Can Buy is about a man with "aspirations for money, power and rich women" working in the international shipping arena.

Beginning in 2004, Pasternak published a relationship column in the Daily Mail titled Daisy Dooley. And in 2007, she published a novel titled Daisy Dooley Does Divorce. Described as being about a "self-help junkie [who] comes to terms with divorce," it features chapters titled "Emotional Contagion" and "Married Singles," The Evening Standard described it as a "laugh out loud romp that you won't be able to put down" and Grazia said "it was a sharp, funny and moving depiction of life after divorce." Kirkus Reviews observed that it was "worth wading through the tears for the generous helping of Daisy Dooley wisdom" though Publishers Weekly called it a "frustrating traipse through divorcedom," concluding that "the reading experience is less than exhilarating."

In 2013, under the name Anna Wallas, Pasternak published a self-help book with her husband titled Call Off The Search.

In 2016, Pasternak published a biography of Boris Pasternak and his mistress, Olga Ivinskaya, titled Lara: The Untold Love Story That Inspired Doctor Zhivago. The book achieved huge critical acclaim and was serialised in American Vogue. The Sunday Times noted it was a "meticulously researched book" NPR said, "With its overview of Russian history in the mid-20th century, including the privations of World War II, the abominations of Stalin's Great Terror, and Khrushchev's insufficient thaw, Lara is a chilling, upsetting reminder of what can happen when free speech is curtailed." While The New York Times said that "the 'untold' in the subtitle simply isn't true" because "the story of Pasternak's affair with Olga has been told repeatedly — for instance, in Olga's own memoirs." It concluded: "In 'Lara,' Anna Pasternak treats 'Doctor Zhivago' as a romance, more or less interchangeable with the hit movie, and she displays minimal understanding of Pasternak's literary achievement."

In 2019, Pasternak issued legal proceedings against American author Lara Prescott, claiming that Prescott's novel The Secrets We Kept features "an astonishing number of substantial elements" taken from Lara. The ruling was mixed with the High Court finding that copyright subsisted in certain selections of events in a non-fictional historical literary work but that there had been no copying by author of a subsequent work of historical fiction. The judge ruled that "It is clear that the defendant did not copy from Lara the selection of events in the relevant chapters of The Secrets We Kept or any part of that selection." Pasternak was ordered to pay back 99% of Prescott's costs, totalling £1M. Shortly thereafter, Pasternak filed for bankruptcy.

In the same year, Pasternak published a book about Wallis Simpson's affair with Edward VIII, titled The American Duchess, the Real Wallis Simpson. Kirkus Reviews wrote that "Pasternak offers a variety of thought-provoking arguments" and The Observer said, "Anna Pasternak's empathetic study of Wallis attempts to redress the balance and emphasises her intelligence, independence and unwillingness to ruin the life of the man she loved. while The Telegraph said, "This Mills & Boon-ish mess might be the worst biography of Wallis Simpson ever written." The Gotham Group closed a rights deal for The American Duchess: The Real Wallis Simpson by New York Times-bestselling author Anna Pasternak in 2020.

In May 2020, Pasternak published an article in The Tatler about Princess Catherine. Kensington Palace threatened legal action, saying that the story "contains a swathe of inaccuracies and false misrepresentations which were not put to Kensington Palace prior to publication." Tatler's Editor-in-Chief Richard Dennen stood behind the reporting of Anna Pasternak and her sources, however, Tatler agreed to cooperate with the Cambridges' request in order "maintain its long-standing relationship with the palace and removed a paragraph from the article."

Pasternak regularly writes articles about and related to the British Royal family and spa and hotel reviews.

=== Film and television commentary ===
Pasternak has also appeared on numerous news programmes and documentaries to share insights about the British Royal family, women's issues and modern relationships. She has occasionally courted controversy with her comments.

In 2021, whilst being interviewed for BBC Breakfast, Pasternak said that,

"anyone like me who is white, privileged and well-educated is not able to say anything without it being viewed as racist" and "we as a white minority nowadays are silenced from being able to speak our truth."

The comments sparked an online backlash. But BBC defended Pasternak following a barrage of complaints about the interview.

In 2021 Pasternak took part in John Sweeney's series on LBC radio, Hunting Ghislaine. The series was later adatped by Sony-backed Eleventh Hour Films for television. Pasternak appeared in the resulting three-hour Sky Documentaries series about former Jeffrey Epstein associate Ghislaine Maxwell, whom Pasternak reportedly knew during their university years. In covering the series, The Guardian referred to Pasternak as the "waffler-in-chief" and called her commentary on Maxwell, a convicted sex offender and human trafficker, "unsearing." The Telegraph observed, "Anna Pasternak, an Oxford contemporary, put forward a theory that seemed to underpin the documentary: if you grow up idolising a crook like Robert Maxwell, then you have no moral compass.

== Personal life ==
Pasternak is married to her former therapist, Andrew Wallas, a psychotherapist and entrepreneur who calls himself "The Modern-Day Wizard." He has taught "spiritual psychology, intuitive healing and body whispering." They met in a yurt. Pasternak has a daughter named Daisy Pasternak.
