= Doctor Zhivago =

Doctor Zhivago is the title of a novel by Boris Pasternak and its various adaptations.

== Description ==
The story, in all of its forms, describes the life of the fictional Russian physician and poet Yuri Zhivago and deals with love and loss during the turmoil of the Russian Revolution and war.

== Adaptations ==
Media using the title Doctor Zhivago includes the following:

- Doctor Zhivago (novel), a 1957 novel by Boris Pasternak
- Doctor Zhivago (film), a 1965 film by David Lean
- Doctor Zhivago (TV series), a 2002 TV series by Giacomo Campiotti
- Doctor Zhivago (musical), a 2011 musical by Lucy Simon
