= Tam Mutu =

English actor

- Born: April 30, 1978 (age 48); Hastings, England, U.K.
- Education: Guildford School of Acting
- Occupation: Actor
- Years active: 2001–present
- Spouse: Kristen Martin (m. 2019)

Tam Mutu (born April 30, 1978) is an English stage and screen actor. He began his career in the West End in the early 2000s. He was part of the original West End production of Andrew Lloyd Webber's Love Never Dies (2010–2011) before starring in the revivals of Les Misérables (2013–2014) and City of Angels (2015). That same year he starred in the original Broadway musical Doctor Zhivago. He returned to Broadway in 2019 with Moulin Rouge! The Musical; for his supporting role of the Duke of Monroth he was nominated for a Grammy Award. On screen, he had a recurring role on the Netflix show Medici.

== Life and career ==
Mutu was born in 1978 in Hastings, England. He has one sister and played football growing up before pursuing acting. He attended the Guildford School of Acting, graduating in 2001 with a Bachelors of Arts with honors in musical theatre. He is of Turkish and Italian descent.

=== 2001–2015: West End and British theatre ===
Following his graduation from drama school in 2001, he was cast as a replacement ensemble member and understudy for Enjolras in the long-running West End production of Les Misérables. In the following five years, he took part in a number of productions with the Royal National Theatre and Royal Shakespeare Company. He also took part in the Regent's Park Open Air Theatre 2002 theatre season.

In 2010, he was part of the original ensemble of the Andrew Lloyd Webber Phantom of the Opera sequel Love Never Dies. Originally the understudy for Ramin Karimloo's Phantom, he later became the alternate. Following its closure, Mutu went on to star in a Toronto production of Chess.

In 2011, Mutu was cast to co-star in the ill-fated gothic musical Rebecca. Set to be his Broadway debut, the production was ultimately cancelled. A few days following the initial postponement of Rebecca in 2012, he was cast to replace Javert in the West End production of Les Misérables. During his time with the show in 2013–2014, the production was a fan favorite, winning the 2014 Olivier Audience Award with Mutu also awarded for his performance by BroadwayWorld and the West End Frame Awards. He went on to star in the Olivier Award-winning revival of City of Angels which opened at Donmar Warehouse in December 2014.

=== 2015–present: Broadway and American theatre ===
Mutu moved to the United States in 2015 to star in the original Broadway musical Doctor Zhivago. The production was ultimately short-lived and closed after a month. He starred as Carey Grant in the initial 2015 and 2016 readings of Flying Over Sunset. He took part in the Encores! concert series and regional theatre, and in 2017 filmed the second season of the Netflix series Medici in Italy. Also in 2017, he played the leading role of Archibald Craven in the 5th Avenue Theatre production of The Secret Garden.

He was cast as the antagonist, the Duke of Monroth, in the pre-Broadway engagement of Moulin Rouge! The Musical in 2018. The production transferred to Broadway and opened in July 2019. The production was paused in March 2020; at that time, Mutu contracted COVID-19 and was hospitalized. The production resumed in September 2021. In May 2022, Mutu departed the production with other original cast members Aaron Tveit and Ricky Rojas. In 2023, he played Bill Sikes in the Encores! production of Oliver!

== Personal life ==
Mutu is noted for his baritone voice. He is married to Kristen "Kem" Martin, a fellow Broadway actor. Mutu was previously engaged to actress Sierra Boggess, with whom he performed in Love Never Dies and Rebecca.

== Acting credits ==
=== Television ===
Year	Title	Role	Notes
2006	Footballers' Wives		2 episodes
2007	Doctors	Craig Walton	1 episode
2007	Holby City	Insp. Peter Kelly	1 episode
2009	Waking the Dead	Zafer	2 episodes
2016	Blue Bloods	Sgt. Ray Langley	1 episodes
2017	Sherlock	Leonard	Episode: "The Final Problem"
2018	Medici	Galeazzo Sforza	5 episodes

=== Theatre ===
Selected credits

Year	Title	Role	Venue	Notes
2001	Les Misérables	Jean Prouvaire (u/s: Enjolras)	Palace Theatre, London	West End replacement
2001–2002	South Pacific	Ensemble (u/s: Lt. Cable)	Royal National Theatre	
2002	Romeo and Juliet	Sampson (u/s: Tybalt)	Regent's Park Open Air Theatre	2002 season
2002	As You Like It	2nd Lord (u/s: Orlando, Charles)	Regent's Park Open Air Theatre	2002 season
2002	Oh, What a Lovely War!	Ensemble	Regent's Park Open Air Theatre	2002 season
2002–2003	Anything Goes	Sailor Quartet	Royal National Theatre	
2003	Love's Labour's Lost	Longaville (u/s: Berwone)	Royal National Theatre	
2004	King Lear	Knight (u/s: Edmund)	Royal Shakespeare Company	
2004	Romeo and Juliet	Tybalt	Royal Shakespeare Company	
2005	East	Mike	Haymarket Theatre	
2006	The Royal Hunt of the Sun	Juan Chavez	Royal National Theatre	
2007	Faustus	Dinos Chapman	UK tour	
2010–2011	Love Never Dies	Ensemble (u/s: The Phantom)	Adelphi Theatre	West End original production
2010–2011	Love Never Dies	The Phantom of the Opera (alternate)	Adelphi Theatre	West End original production
2011	Chess	Anatoly Sergievsky	Princess of Wales Theatre	Toronto production
2012	Rebecca	Maxim de Winter	Broadhurst Theatre	Cancelled Broadway production
2012–2014	Les Misérables	Inspector Javert	Sondheim Theatre	West End replacement
2014–2015	City of Angels	Stone	Donmar Warehouse	West End revival
2015	Doctor Zhivago	Doctor Yuri Zhivago	Broadway Theatre	Broadway original production
2015–2016	Flying Over Sunset	Carey Grant	Vineyard Arts Project	1st Martha's Vineyard reading
2015–2016	Flying Over Sunset	Carey Grant	Vineyard Arts Project	2nd Martha's Vineyard reading
2017	The New Yorkers	Al Spanish	New York City Center	Encores! concert
2017	The Secret Garden	Lord Archibald Craven	5th Avenue Theatre	Regional replacement
2018	Hey Look Me Over!		New York City Center	Encores! concert
2018	Moulin Rouge! The Musical	Duke of Monroth	Emerson Colonial Theatre	Boston original production
2019-2020	Moulin Rouge! The Musical	Duke of Monroth	Al Hirschfeld Theatre	Broadway original production
2021-2022	Moulin Rouge! The Musical	Duke of Monroth	Al Hirschfeld Theatre	Broadway original production
2023	Oliver!	Bill Sikes	New York City Center	Encores!
2025-2026	Chicago	Billy Flynn	Ambassador Theatre	Broadway replacement

== Awards and nominations ==
Year	Ceremony	Category	Work	Result	Ref.
2013	Broadway World UK Awards	Best Performance in a Long-Running West End Show	Les Misérables	Won	
2014	West End Frame Awards	Best Performance of a Song	Les Misérables ("Stars")	Won	
2015	Drama League Award	Distinguished Performance	Doctor Zhivago	Nominated	
2020	Grammy Award	Best Musical Theater Album	Moulin Rouge!	Nominated	
