= The Secrets We Kept =

- Cover of the 2019 Knopf Publishing Group edition
- Author: Lara Prescott
- Language: English
- Publisher: Alfred A. Knopf
- Publication date: 2019
- Dewey Decimal: 813.6
- LC Class: PS3616.R463 S43

The Secrets We Kept is a 2019 debut novel by Lara Prescott published by the Alfred A. Knopf imprint of Penguin Random House, after a bidding war between publishers was ended by a US$2,000,000 deal.

== Plot ==
The novel is a fictionalized account of the writing and CIA's clandestine distribution of Doctor Zhivago by Boris Pasternak during the Cold War.

== Reviews ==
The Los Angeles Review of Books compared it to classic Russian literature: “Lara Prescott’s debut follows in the footsteps of classic Russian novels by being an epic love story that is both brilliant and bleak, one that is wound into the fabric of tragic, true history…I can’t stop thinking about this book. Prescott has uncovered a time when people—normal people—risked their lives and careers for literature. Why don’t we see that today?” Karen Valby of The New York Times called it a "gorgeous and romantic feast of a novel" and Vogue called it a "stunning spycraft debut."

British author Anna Pasternak sued Prescott in 2019 claiming infringement in her book, Lara: The Untold Love Story and the Inspiration for Doctor Zhivago. Penguin Random House defended Prescott, saying the claims were "simply without merit." In 2022, Pasternak lost the case, with the judge saying it was "extraordinary" that she brought the claim without ever having read The Secrets We Kept and that The Secrets We Kept had not been copied.
