= Rastrelli (surname) =

Rastrelli may refer to the following persons:

- Antonio Rastrelli (politician) (1927–2019), Italian politician
- Antonio Rastrelli (born 1945), Italian Olympic swimmer
- Carlo Bartolomeo Rastrelli (1675–1744), Italian sculptor who emigrated to Russia in 1716
- Francesco Bartolomeo Rastrelli (1700–1771), French-born Russian architect, son of Carlo
- Massimo Rastrelli (better known as Mr. Zivago), Italian singer
