= A Song to Sing, O =

Musical play by Melvyn Morrow

A Song to Sing, O is a one-man musical play by Melvyn Morrow with songs by Gilbert and Sullivan and by George Grossmith, about the life of comedian and actor George Grossmith, who originated the principal comic roles for the most famous Savoy operas from 1877 through the 1880s. The plot concerns a fictional backstage interview given by Grossmith to an American reporter in 1889 during his last performance of The Yeomen of the Guard – indeed, his last performance for the D'Oyly Carte Opera Company (although he did return briefly in 1897 in His Majesty). In between some interview gossip, Grossmith sings Gilbert and Sullivan songs, and some of his own songs to the reporter, and he enacts a scene from Grossmith's book, The Diary of a Nobody.

The show was originally created for D'Oyly Carte star John Reed at the Savoy Theatre in London in 1981. The Times review commented that it was "as if the writer never trusted the Savoyards to accept more than the slightest criticism of Gilbert and Sullivan while he was actually straining to say something genuinely rude" and that the script "refrains from real expression. ... The attraction is almost entirely the talented twisting of Mr. Reed's tongue around familiar patter."

The piece has since been played in Australia by Anthony Warlow in 1987 and Dennis Olsen in 1991.

== Musical numbers ==
Songs by Gilbert and Sullivan

- When I good friends – Trial by Jury
- My name is John Wellington Wells – The Sorcerer
- Over the bright blue sea; Sir Joseph's barge is seen; I am the Monarch of the Sea; When I was a lad – H.M.S. Pinafore
- Hold monsters! - I am the very model of a modern Major General – The Pirates of Penzance
- If you're anxious for to shine – Patience
- If you go in; When you're lying awake – Iolanthe
- If you give me your attention – Princess Ida
- I’ve got a little list; Tit-willow; There is beauty - The Mikado
- My boy you may take it from me; I know a youth – Ruddigore
- Finale Act 2 – The Yeomen of the Guard

Songs by Grossmith

- A Peculiar Man
- I'm Tired of the Moon
- The Muddle Puddle Porter
- See Me Dance the Polka
- Johnny at the Gaiety
- French Verbs
