= Hans Matheson =

British actor

- Born: 7 August 1975 (age 51); Stornoway, Isle of Lewis, Scotland
- Education: Italia Conti Academy of Theatre Arts
- Occupations: Actor, musician
- Years active: 1995–present

Hans Matheson (born 7 August 1975) is a Scottish actor and musician. In a wide-ranging film and television career he has taken lead roles in diverse films such as Doctor Zhivago, Sherlock Holmes, The Tudors, Tess of the d'Urbervilles, Clash of the Titans and 300: Rise of an Empire. In addition to acting, Matheson sings and plays guitar, violin and harmonica, and released an album of his songs in 2019.

== Early life ==
Matheson was born in Stornoway, Isle of Lewis, Scotland. His parents were Sheena, a therapist, and Iain (Ado), a folk musician and painter. His late younger brother, William Matheson, was also an actor. The family soon moved to Kent, where he has since been based, though with regular visits back to the north of Scotland. He disliked school and prompted by his mother enrolled and studied at the Italia Conti Academy of Theatre Arts, London.

== Career ==
His first screen appearance was as a youth being interviewed by the police in an episode of The Bill in 1995; he was then cast in other UK TV dramas before he made his feature film debut as Johnny Silver in Jez Butterworth's directorial debut, Mojo. He had created the same role in the stage premiere at the Royal Court Theatre in July 1995. He followed the film Mojo with Stella Does Tricks, playing a young male prostitute hooked on drugs who befriends Stella, a 15 year old prostitute.

Matheson then played Marius in Bille August's film version of Les Misérables, appearing alongside Liam Neeson, Geoffrey Rush and Claire Danes, where he "was determined to play him as a heartfelt revolutionary, demanding power for the people". When he went to New York it was the first time he had left the UK in what he described shortly after as "an unbelievable turn of events". The same year, Matheson played guitar for the role of Luke Shand, a youthful rocker helping to invigorate an old band in the film Still Crazy.

He continued with a leading role in the British hit Tube Tales, which led to his first commercialized film, Bodywork, starring as a market trader framed for murder, with Beth Winslet, Charlotte Coleman, and Clive Russell. In 2000 he starred in Canone Inverso set in the 1930s, as Jeno Varga, a young man who falls in love with a pianist; he learnt the violin for this role. Following Canone Inverso, he played Mordred in the American TV film The Mists of Avalon. In his next film he played Tomas in the Norwegian-Danish feature I Am Dina, released in 2002, and based upon Dinas Bok.

Matheson, still relatively unknown, landed the central role of Yuri Zhivago in Giacomo Campiotti's 2002 adaptation of Boris Pasternak's novel, Doctor Zhivago after a long search by its producers. The actor visited Pasternak's niece in Oxford, and on reading some of the Russian poetry (in translation by his sister) was "inspired beyond belief"; and saw it as a "great opportunity to play a wonderful character with such a huge range of emotions". Despite inevitable comparisons with the 1965 Lean film, his portrayal - "intense, playful, assured and able to convey a very effective sense of trouble brewing" was praised, and another critic commended the "outstanding performances", noting how "Matheson's sunken eyes capture the toll Zhivago's travails exact upon him, both spiritually and physically".

Matheson played a private in the trenches in the 2002 horror war film Deathwatch, then in early 2004 he starred as an alcoholic in rehab in the television docu-film Comfortably Numb, which he later described as "his proudest role". While some critics objected to the mix of drama and documentary, and of professional and amateur actors, one described Matheson's performance as "as affecting as it was understated", adding "I haven't seen anyone command the small screen so effectively in a long time. In 2006, Matheson co-starred as a lighthouse-keeper who has a romance with murder mystery author Demi Moore in the film Half Light. He then portrayed the Earl of Essex in a BBC production about Queen Elizabeth I of England called The Virgin Queen, broadcast in the US in 2005 and the UK in 2006. For this role, he sought to emulate the swagger of Marc Bolan, listening a lot to Bolan and Kurt Cobain (for his aggression) in the dressing room; he added "I really, really loved playing this character ...with Essex I felt I had to constantly come outside of my safety zone, which was very liberating for me". Another period drama followed when he appeared as Archbishop Thomas Cranmer in the second season of the Showtime series The Tudors in 2008.

The same year Matheson played Alec Stoke-d'Urberville, "calculating and spoilt, but also friendly and charming" in the four-part BBC adaptation of Tess of the d'Urbervilles. His was not the one-note villain, rather a damaged and misguided individual; "I tried to find something in his story. I don't think that he ever intended to hurt Tess and I think he believed he loved her, but in reality it was more of an obsession", Matheson commented later. The Thomas Hardy Society review found his Alec "intelligently portrayed... an amoral, nouveau-riche, deracinated figure", while another critic added that the "relationship between Tess and Alec is extremely well portrayed".

The following year he was the Home Secretary Lord Coward, alongside Robert Downey Jr. and Jude Law, in Guy Ritchie's film Sherlock Holmes (2009). Matheson then played Argive archer Ixas in the 2010 Clash of the Titans remake.

Described in Sight and Sound as "neatly but not lavishly mounted" with Matheson "at ease as the Doubting Thomas minister", he starred in The Christmas Candle as Reverend David Richmond. He considered the film more as a "romantic comedy", and not a message of Christian faith, and was drawn to the idea of an authority figure, vicar, who humbly realises that there is much more for him to learn.

He had a supporting role as Aeschylus in 300: Rise of an Empire, which required him to get fit in about ten weeks through hard-core training. In 2015 he was cast in the lead role of John Blackwood (Johnny Jackson) a "flawed" but "lovable rogue", who is seeking redemption from actions committed in his past in the ITV series Jericho, which aired in January 2016 in the UK; but the drama was not continued after its first series.

== Approach to acting ==
In an interview with the actor in 2015, Olivia Sharpe noted that he had often played the dark hero, and that getting "into the psyche of a character and show their many facets is the mark of a great actor, which Hans undoubtedly is, although he modestly admits that there have been many roles he would sooner forget". Matheson admitted that he had occasionally taken jobs that weren't his first choice in order to make ends meet. Time constraints when filming were a problem, "you miss process; process is where results and creative things happen and you discover. The whole point of the job for me is discovering new things; that is what is exciting. If you are forced into a situation where you just have to come up with something, you will probably give something… not safe, but just something that you can rely on because there is just not the opportunity to explore together and try things". He acknowledged that he was occasionally nervous when performing, wishing that he could be in control of himself, adding that in acting one has to "let go" and that "you can't guarantee what happens". He also found that the best actors have difficulties with a poor script: "My dad once asked me: 'What is the most difficult thing about being an actor?' and I told him that it's all about trying to make bad writing work. It's quite humbling to realise that you're only as good as the story you're telling".

On two of his most important roles, Zhivago and Essex, he commented in 2014 "When I played Zhivago, I thought I'm never going to play a character that's going to give me so much to play with. I just loved it so much, the whole process from beginning to end, reading the book, everything. But then this has been the same. I can't think of two more extreme characters than Zhivago and Essex so it's going to be difficult to follow those".

An early interviewer noted that Matheson was ambivalent about becoming famous, and in 2002 he again expressed his concern at becoming "a media face, someone who's well known by people he doesn't know". Seeing acting more as a vocation than a career, he stated that "You've got to realise that it's not everything, making films", and that what he does in his life should have some meaning to him, not just a way to pay the rent; "...my music is really more essential to me for my soul". In 2013 he professed that despite the time pressures of filming his was "a fun job. I don't know how, but sometimes it seems that they squeeze every last moment, and it is a shame, as it would be a lot more fun".

== Filmography ==
=== Film ===
- Stella Does Tricks (1996) as Eddie
- The Future Lasts A Long Time (short, 1997), as Jimmy Dolen
- Mojo (1997), as Silver Johnny
- Les Misérables (1998), as Marius Pontmercy
- Still Crazy (1998), as Luke Shand
- Tube Tales (1999), as Michael, in the ninth film, Steal Away
- Bodywork (1999), as Virgil Guppy
- Canone Inverso (2000), as Jeno Varga
- I Am Dina (2001), as Tomas
- Deathwatch (2002), as Private Jack Hawkstone
- Comfortably Numb (2004), as Jake
- Imperium: Nero (2004), as Nero
- Half Light (2006), as Angus McCullough
- Bathory (2008), as Caravaggio
- Sherlock Holmes (2009) as Lord Coward
- Clash of the Titans (2010) as Ixas
- The Christmas Candle (2013) as David Richmond
- 300: Rise of an Empire (2014) as Aeschylus

=== Television ===
- The Bill (1995) (Episode 'Still Waters') as Lee
- Wycliffe (Episode 22) (1996) as Gary Creed
- Poldark (1996) (HTV pilot programme), as Ben Carter
- Bramwell (Series 2 Episode 7) (1996), as Frederick Hackett
- Christmas (TV drama written by Tom and Jez Butterworth) (1996) Channel 4, as Manny
- Family Money (1997) (Channel 4, four episodes), as Jake
- The Mists of Avalon (2001), as Mordred
- Doctor Zhivago (2002), as Yuri Zhivago
- The Virgin Queen (2005), as Robert Devereux, 2nd Earl of Essex
- The Tudors (2008), as Archbishop Thomas Cranmer
- Tess of the d'Urbervilles (2008), as Alec d'Urberville
- Jericho (2016), as Johnny Jackson (John Blackwood)

=== Theatre ===
- Mojo (1995), as Silver Johnny
- Cuba Real: Trio (2004), as Angel (rehearsed reading)

== Music ==
Having appeared on his father Ado's albums Out on the Islands in 2003 (vocals, violin, percussion), and The Healing Waves – Songs of Loss Longing Love and Liberation (vocals, percussion, drums, viola) in 2019, Matheson released his own first album in 2019 entitled Sail the Sea with ten songs composed by him (vocals, guitar).

He also sings on the 1998 soundtrack album of Still Crazy (1998), and one song on the soundtrack of Mojo.
