= Olga Ivinskaya =

Russian poet and writer, Soviet gulag detainee

- Ольга Всеволодовна Ивинская
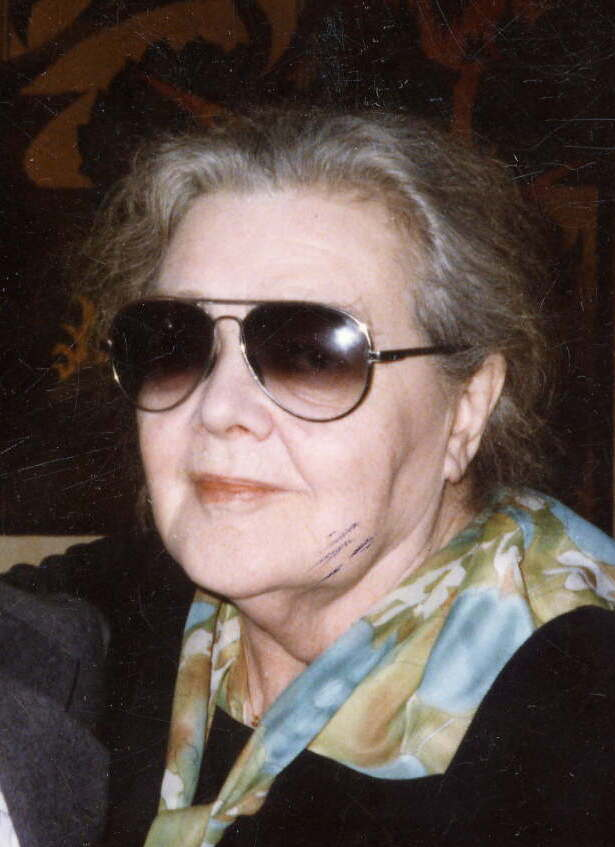
- Ivinskaya in 1989
- Born: June 16, 1912; Tambov, Russian Empire
- Died: September 8, 1995 (aged 83); Moscow, Russia
- Occupation: Poet
- Spouses: Ivan Emelianov (1936-1939); Alexander Vinogradov (m.1941)
- Partner: Boris Pasternak
- Children: Irina Emelianov (born 1936); Dmitry Vinogradov
- Writing career
- Language: Russian

Olga Vsevolodovna Ivinskaya (Russian: Ольга Всеволодовна Ивинская; June 16, 1912, in Tambov – September 8, 1995, in Moscow) was a Soviet poet and writer. She is best-known as friend and lover of Nobel Prize-winning writer Boris Pasternak during the last 13 years of his life and the inspiration for the character of Lara in his novel Doctor Zhivago (1957).

== Early life ==
Ivinskaya, of German-Polish descent, was born in Tambov to a provincial high school teacher. In 1915, the family moved to Moscow. After graduating from the Editorial Workers Institute in Moscow in 1936, she worked as an editor at various literary magazines. She was an admirer of Pasternak since her adolescence, attending literary gatherings to listen to his poetry. She married twice: the first time to Ivan Emelianov in 1936, who hanged himself in 1939, having one daughter, Irina Emelianova; the second time in 1941 to Alexander Vinogradov (later killed in the war), producing one son, Dmitry Vinogradov.

== Relationship with Pasternak ==
She met Boris Pasternak in October 1946, in the editorial office of Novy Mir, where she was in charge of the new authors department. She was romantically involved with him until his death, although he refused to leave his wife. Early in 1948, he asked her to leave Novy Mir, as her position there was getting more difficult because of their relationship. She took up a role as his secretary instead.

Ivinskaya collaborated closely with Pasternak on translating poetry from foreign languages into Russian. While she was translating the Bengali language poet Rabindranath Tagore, Pasternak advised her, to "1) bring out the theme of the poem, its subject matter, as clearly as possible; 2) tighten up the fluid, non-European form by rhyming internally, not at the end of the lines; 3) use loose, irregular meters, mostly ternary ones. You may allow yourself to use assonances." Later, while collaborating with him on a translation of the Czech language poet Vítězslav Nezval, Pasternak told Ivinskaya, "Use the literal translation only for the meaning, but do not borrow words as they stand from it: they are absurd and not always comprehensible. Don't translate everything, only what you can manage, and by this means try to make the translation more precise than the original—an absolute necessity in the case of such a confused, slipshod piece of work."

Pasternak acknowledged Ivinskaya as the inspiration for Doctor Zhivago's heroine Lara. Many poems by Yuri Zhivago in the novel were addressed by Pasternak to Ivinskaya.

In October 1949, Ivinskaya was arrested as "an accomplice to the spy" and in July 1950 was sentenced by the Special Council of the NKVD to five years in the Gulag. That was seen as an attempt to press Pasternak to give up writings critical of the Soviet system. In a 1958 letter to a friend in West Germany, Pasternak wrote, "She was put in jail on my account, as the person considered by the secret police to be closest to me, and they hoped that by means of a grueling interrogation and threats they could extract enough evidence from her to put me on trial. I owe my life and the fact that they did not touch me in those years to her heroism and endurance."

At that time of her arrest, Ivinskaya was pregnant by Pasternak and miscarried. She was released in 1953 after Stalin's death. Doctor Zhivago was published in Italy in 1957 by Feltrinelli, with Ivinskaya conducting all negotiations on Pasternak's behalf.

Ivinskaya was one of nine prisoners of conscience featured in Persecution 1961, a book by Peter Benenson that helped launch Amnesty International. In it, Benenson lauded her for refusing to cooperate with KGB and for willingly suffering to protect Pasternak. A publication of her alleged letters in "Moskovsky Komsomolets" in 1997 suggested that, like most torture victims, she had been induced to cooperate with the KGB.

== Final years ==
After Pasternak's death in 1960, Ivinskaya was arrested for the second time, with her daughter, Irina Emelianova. She was accused of being Pasternak's link with Western publishers in dealing in hard currency for Doctor Zhivago. The Soviet government quietly released them, Irina after one year, in 1962, and Ivinskaya in 1964. She served four years of an eight-year sentence, apparently to punish her for the relationship. In 1978, her memoirs were published in Paris in Russian and were translated in English under the title A Captive of Time.

Ivinskaya was rehabilitated only under Gorbachev in 1988. All of Pasternak's letters to her and other manuscripts and documents had been seized by the KGB during her last arrest. She spent several years in litigation trying to regain them. However, those were blocked by Pasternak's daughter-in-law, Natalya. The Supreme Court of Russia ended up ruling against her on the ground that "there was no proof of ownership," and "papers should remain in the state archive." She died in 1995 from cancer. A reporter on NTV compared Ivinskaya's role to that of other famous muses for Russian writers: "As Pushkin would not be complete without Anna Kern, and Yesenin would be nothing without Isadora Duncan, so Pasternak would not be Pasternak without Olga Ivinskaya, who was his inspiration for 'Doctor Zhivago.'" Her daughter, Irina Emelianova, who emigrated to France in 1985, published a book of memories of her mother's affair with Pasternak.
