= Charles Alexander Pasternak =

British biochemist

Charles Alexander Pasternak (born March 1930) is a British scientist. Educated at Oxford University, he then spent two years at Yale University Medical School. He spent the next 16 years at the Department of Biochemistry, University of Oxford, with a Tutorial Fellowship at Worcester College. In 1976, he took up the Foundation Chair of Biochemistry at St George’s Hospital Medical School, University of London.

Commissioned into the Royal Artillery in 1953, he spent 12 years in the Territorial Army in the Oxford & Bucks Light Infantry, and later the Royal Green Jackets, retiring with the rank of Major.

In 1992, Pasternak founded the Oxford International Biomedical Centre and is currently President.

He has sat on many international editorial boards (Founder-Editor of Bioscience Reports) and advisory committees (including UNESCO, Chulabhorn Research Institute, Bangkok and Antenna Technologies, Geneva). He has an Hon MD from the Medical University of Bucharest and is a Foreign Member of the Polish Academy of Arts and Sciences.

Pasternak is the nephew of writer and poet Boris Pasternak and the father of writer Anna Pasternak.

== Books ==
- Biochemistry of Differentiation (1970)
- Radioimmunoassay and Related Topics in Clinical Biochemistry (1975)
- An Introduction to Human Biochemistry (1979)
- Monovalent Cations in Biological Systems (1990)
- The Molecules Within Us: Our Body in Health and Disease (1998)
- Biosciences 2000: Current Aspects and Prospects for the Next Millennium (1999)
- Quest: The Essence of Humanity (2003)
- What Makes Us Human? (2007)
- Access Not Excess: The Search for Better Nutrition (2011)
- Blinkers: Scientific Ignorance and Evasion (2012)
- Africa South of the Sahara: Continued Failure or Delayed Success? (2018)
- Androcentrism: The Ascendancy of Man (2021)
- Evaluating a Pandemic (2023)
