= West End Frame Awards =

- Country: United Kingdom
- Presented by: West End Frame
- First award: 2012
- Website: https://westendframe.co.uk/

The West End Frame Awards are London Theatre awards created by the theatre website West End Frame. The awards are different from other theatre awards as they only open voting for one category at a time. During 2012 theatre fans were invited to vote in seven categories. High-profile nominees during the 2012 awards included Kerry Ellis, Jodie Prenger, Rob Brydon and Lee Mead. The winners included Shayne Ward for Best West End Debut and Daniel Buckley for Funniest Performance in a West End Show.

So far the 2013 West End Frame Awards has seen various categories (some new categories and some returning categories) including Best Jukebox musical, Best Performance of a Song in a Musical (the Award was previously won by Rachel Tucker in 2012), Understudy Of The Year and Best West End Debut.

On 15 May 2013 the full list of nominees for West End Frame's Understudy of the Year Award was announced. Voting then opened on Thursday 16 May for a six-week voting period, noticeably longer than Best Jukebox musical and Best Performance of a Song in a Musical which received two week long voting periods. Ashley Day won the award for understudying Elder Price in The Book of Mormon.

In August 2013 Zrinka Cvitešić won Best West End Debut for her performance in Once and in October Sion Daniel Young won Best Dramatic Performance for his performance in War Horse. Upstairs at the Gatehouse's production of Avenue Q won London Fringe Production of the Year in December. Finally, two Editor's Choice West End Frame Awards were introduced. American composer Scott Alan won Theatrical Event of the Year for his concert at the IndigO2 and the Menier Chocolate Factory's production of The Color Purple picked up Show of the Year.

The 2014 West End Frame Awards began in March when The Book of Mormon was voted Funniest West End Show. The West End production of Les Misérables won its first West End Frame Award in May when cast member Tam Mutu topped the Best Performance of a Song in a Musical category.

Understudy Of The Year returns for its third year as part of the 2014 Awards. Voting opens on Friday, June 6 and closes on Wednesday, July 16.
