= Tess of the D'Urbervilles (2008 TV serial) =

2008 British television serial

- DVD cover
- Written by: David Nicholls (adaptation)
- Directed by: David Blair
- Starring: Gemma Arterton; Hans Matheson; Ruth Jones; Jodie Whittaker; Eddie Redmayne; Ian Puleston-Davies; Anna Massey; Christopher Fairbank; Donald Sumpter
- Country of origin: United Kingdom
- Original language: English
- No. of series: 1
- No. of episodes: 4 (2 U.S.)

Production
- Producer: David Snodin
- Running time: 60 minutes

Original release
- Network: BBC One; BBC HD
- Release: 14 September – 5 October 2008

Tess of the D'Urbervilles is a 4-hour BBC television adaptation of Thomas Hardy's 1891 book of the same name. The script is by David Nicholls. It tells the story of Tess Durbeyfield, a low-born country girl whose family find they have noble connections.

The series commenced in the United Kingdom on 14 September 2008 and ran until 5 October 2008 airing in four parts on BBC One. In the United States, it aired as part of PBS's Masterpiece Classic in two parts from 4 January until 11 January 2009. In Australia, ABC1 also opted to air this series as a two-part special each Sunday at 8:30pm from 11 April until 18 April 2010.. In Spain, it aired on BBC Series.

The cast features Gemma Arterton as Tess, Hans Matheson as Alec, Eddie Redmayne as Angel, Ruth Jones as Joan, Anna Massey as Mrs d'Urberville and Kenneth Cranham as Rev Clare.

== Production ==
=== Writing ===
David Nicholls first read Hardy's famous novel at the age of 16, but on reapproaching the story over 25 years later he says "it seemed to cry out for a new screen adaptation". He described it as "a wonderfully emotionally-charged story, both intensely romantic and startlingly violent". In adapting the novel for the screen Nicholls gave particular focus to the character of Tess as "an active, forceful, opinionated young working-class woman" and not merely a "passive victim". He was also "keen to emphasise that this is very much a novel about young people in love".

On completion of the project Nicholls said he was "delighted" with how it turned out, hoping audiences would find it "faithfully captures the light and shade of Hardy's masterpiece".

=== Filming ===
Gemma Arterton and Hans Matheson shooting on location.

Nicholls worked closely with director David Blair to ensure the visual style of the series complemented his faithful adaptation of the story. The episodes were largely filmed in Gloucestershire and Wiltshire and shot on high quality 35mm film rather than on digital video for a richer and more romantic appearance. Nicholls observed that "any adaptation of Hardy has to capture the beauty of his nature writing without forgetting that this is a brutal, unforgiving landscape", and that "the production should be beautiful but not 'pretty'; it should be about characters in a landscape, not just the landscape."

The series made extensive use of location shooting. Filming took place in many parts of southern England, including Thomas Hardy's native Dorset. Nicholls recalled how he found "Tess and Angel's farewell in the morning light at Stonehenge... the most moving scene in English literature, so to be able to recreate it, at dawn, on location at the correct time of year, has been tremendously exciting."

The score was composed by Rob Lane, and includes the folk song 'The Snow it melts the soonest'.

== Cast and characters ==
=== Primary characters ===
- Gemma Arterton as Tess Durbeyfield - Tess is the innocent but spirited protagonist of the story and the eldest daughter of a poor, rural Victorian family. She is sensitive, loyal and kind and tries to do the best for her loved ones. A "fine and handsome girl", Tess easily attracts the attention of admirers but her life is undone by their misdeeds and misjudgements.

Arterton said, "I was attracted to the role because stripped down, it's such a basic story about love and missed opportunities, everyone can relate to it. It's also just brilliant, brilliant storytelling." She perceives Tess as "a straightforward country girl, very pretty, but unaware of her beauty. Although people chip away at her life, she grows stronger, which is the incredible thing about her."

- Hans Matheson as Alec D'Urbeville - Alec is the self-centered and manipulative eldest son of Tess' supposed illustrious relatives, the D'Urbervilles. After going to work at The Slopes — Alec's family home — Tess falls into his clutches. He is the "tragic mischief" and she is easily seduced by his apparent charm and generosity.

Matheson observed that "Although Alec's actions are extreme, they're unconscious. So you have to understand him as a human being, as well as a villain." He also found the story "about the countryside... [about] spring and the seasons and the descriptions of love" and found it surprising how few cinematic versions there were of the tale, because "the novel is so filmic."

- Eddie Redmayne as Angel Clare - Angel is an intelligent and kind clergyman's son. Tess first sees him at a May Day dance but he ignores her. Choosing to follow a life in farming rather than one in the Church, he wants to work for the "honour and glory of man". Tess meets him again at a farm where she's working as a milkmaid and they fall deeply in love.

Redmayne heaped praise on the novel and the character of Tess, acknowledging that "Hardy had the boldness to create a character with great strength at that time, which I think is what makes her so enduring and relevant today".

- Ruth Jones as Joan Durbeyfield
- Ian Puleston-Davies as John Durbeyfield
- Jodie Whittaker as Izz Huett
- Donald Sumpter as Parson Tringham
- Anna Massey as Mrs D'Urbeville
- Christopher Fairbank as Groby
- Jo Woodcock as Liza-Lu Durbeyfield

=== Secondary characters ===
- Joel Rowbottom as Abraham Durbeyfield
- Steven Robertson as Cuthbert Clare
- Hugh Skinner as Felix Clare
- Laura Elphinstone as Car Darch
- Sara Lloyd Gregory as Nancy Darch
- Christine Bottomley as Kate
- Emma Stansfield as Mary
- Merelina Kendall as Miss Evans
- Sarah Counsell as Drunken woman
- Ellie Darcey-Alden as Modesty
- Julie Barclay as Mrs Baxter
- Cellan Geraint David as "Baby Sorrow "

== Episodes ==
No.	Title	Original release date	Viewers (millions)
1	"Episode One"	14 September 2008	5.66
On a fine May afternoon, the beautiful and innocent Tess Durbeyfield spies a handsome young stranger at a village dance, but he ignores her. Forced by family hardship to seek support from her 'relatives' the D'Urbervilles, apparently an ancient lineage, she falls under the spell of her manipulative 'cousin' Alec — with shocking and lasting consequences.
2	"Episode Two"	21 September 2008	5.06
Tess returns home in confusion and shame after being raped by her manipulative 'cousin' Alec D'Urberville. Her baby, whom she christens Sorrow, is a sickly child, but Tess finds work on a dairy farm where she meets the handsome Angel Clare again. Can he offer her the love and deliverance she craves?
3	"Episode Three"	28 September 2008	4.94
Tess agrees to marry Angel, to his great joy. When he confesses to a dishonourable event in his own past, Tess feels that she can at last tell him about her relationship with Alec D'Urberville and its consequences.
4	"Episode Four"	5 October 2008	5.61
Angel has gone to Brazil, leaving Tess to endure a harsh winter on a swede farm. While being relentlessly pursued by Alec, she has written to Angel, pleading with him to return before it is too late. Unfortunately, Angel has been struck down by a dangerous fever, and when Tess' sister arrives with bad news about their father it sparks a chain of misfortunes. Tess ends up being hanged after murdering Alec.

== Reception ==
Reaction to the serial was mixed, generating mainly warm but unenthusiastic reviews. Most critics were impressed with the acting, especially of Gemma Arterton's portrayal of the titular character, but found the period details to be anachronistic.

Euan Ferguson of The Guardian praised the first and second episodes as "wonderful", and that while it lacked the "bubbling, spirited humour of Cranford" it was "less insipid than so much Austen". He also acclaimed Arterton as "terribly subtle" in the leading role.

Hermione Eyre of The Independent called it a "commendably faithful adaptation" and praised Arterton's performance in the titular role, asserting that the actress "brims with life and spirit". Eyre acknowledged that the version lacked the "power" of Roman Polanski's 1979 version.

Robert Hanks, also of The Independent, noted that the series "looks lovely" but perhaps "a bit too lovely". While noting Gemma Arterton as "gorgeous" he found the acting "mostly fair to middling" with the exception of Anna Massey, whom he called "quite brilliant" in the role of Mrs D'Urberville. Hanks also bemoaned the lack of realism, noting that too many costume dramas today "can’t afford to remind the viewer too explicitly just how grubby and laborious life was in the days before indoor hot running water, automatic washing machines and biological powder".

In a review for the Thomas Hardy Society Journal, Roger Webster praised many elements of the series; the casting, screenplay, and visual qualities of the production, and concluding his essay "it certainly has a great deal to offer as both literary adaptation and television drama".

In the US Mary McNamara of the Los Angeles Times found Blair was able to make "full and gorgeous use of Hardy's depiction of Tess as Earth Goddess" and praised the "visceral visual beauty" elicited from the landscape. She also found Arterton "a marvelous Tess" which she saw as important "considering the film pretty much lives or dies with her performance".

Brian Lowry of Variety also acclaimed Arterton's performance; calling her "wide-eyed and lovely" he praised how she "conveys the pitiful plight of her simple character trapped in an unforgiving society". He was critical of the pacing, saying that the series soon becomes an "arduous trek". Still he found that "the payoff is strong enough to justify all that hiking across lush countryside".

David Wiegand of the San Francisco Chronicle was less than impressed. He found David Blair's direction "competent" but also criticised the show's regard for period authenticity, finding that "the impoverished Durbeyfields and other villagers look a bit too well scrubbed and freshly laundered and that Wessex itself is a bit too pretty". He remarked that Gemma Arterton was "excellent" and that the serial would "do as a reminder of Hardy's timeless appeal until something better comes along".

Several viewers, while enjoying the series, noted that the hymn 'How Great Thou Art' was anachronistic. Some were disturbed enough to complain to the BBC.
