= Lazar Fleishman =

Russian literary scholar

- Born: 1944 (age 81–82)
- Awards: Guggenheim fellowship (1987)

Academic work
- Discipline: literary scholar
- Sub-discipline: Russian literature
- Institutions: Stanford University

Lazar Fleishman (born 1944) is a Russian historian and literary scholar and Professor of Slavic Languages and Literatures at Stanford University. He is known for his expertise on comparative literature.
