= Lara Prescott =

American author

- Born: Greensburg, Pennsylvania, U.S.
- Citizenship: US
- Education: University of Texas at Austin (MFA)
- Occupations: Author, fiction writer
- Writing career
- Language: English
- Years active: 2019–present
- Notable works: The Secrets We Kept, New York Times bestseller

Lara Prescott is an American author of fiction, including the debut novel The Secrets We Kept.

== Early life and education ==
Prescott was born and raised in Greensburg, Pennsylvania. She graduated from Greensburg Central Catholic High School in 2000 and attended American University in Washington, D.C., where she studied political science. She earned a Master of Fine Arts (MFA) degree at the Michener Center for Writers at the University of Texas at Austin.

== Career ==
Before becoming a writer, Prescott worked as a political campaign consultant. She worked as a digital communications consultant and ghost writer for progressive politicians.

Her debut novel, The Secrets We Kept, was a New York Times bestseller and Reese Witherspoon Book Club pick. It has been translated into over 30 languages and is being adapted for television.

== Personal ==
Prescott's husband, also a writer, works for the Humane Society of the United States.

== Bibliography ==
- The Secrets We Kept (2019)
