= Mr. Zivago =

Italian singer

- Born: Massimo Rastrelli; 1961 (age 63–64)
- Origin: Italy
- Genres: italo disco
- Occupation: singer
- Instrument: vocals

Massimo Rastrelli, known by his stage name Mr. Zivago, is an Italian singer, best known for the song "Little Russian". He has a big following in Russia.

== Discography ==
Albums

- Tell by Your Eyes (1992)
- Tell by Your Eyes: Covers (雨が叫んでる～カヴァーズ～) (1993)

Singles

- "Little Russian" (1987)
- "Love in Moscow" (1991)
- "Tell By Your Eyes" (1992) – number 98 in Japan
  Covered and released in Japan as a single in 1992 by Toshihiko Tahara, see "雨が叫んでる" in the Japanese Wikipedia.
- "Russian Paradise" (2007)
- "Falling from Heaven" (2024) in streaming
