= Doctor Zhivago (musical) =

Doctor Zhivago – A New Musical
- Playbill from the Original Broadway Production
- Music: Lucy Simon
- Lyrics: Michael Korie and Amy Powers
- Basis: Based on the novel by Boris Pasternak of the same name
- Productions: 2006 La Jolla Playhouse; 2011 Australia tour 2015 Broadway

Doctor Zhivago – A New Musical is a musical composed by Lucy Simon, lyrics by Michael Korie and Amy Powers, and book by Michael Weller; it is based on Boris Pasternak's 1957 novel Doctor Zhivago. It premiered in San Diego, California, in 2006, played in on tour in Australia in 2011, and, after several other productions, was staged on Broadway in 2015. Further productions have followed in several countries, including a long-running German production.

== Productions ==
The show originally premiered as Zhivago in 2006 at the La Jolla Playhouse in San Diego, California, with Ivan Hernandez in the title role as Yurii Zhivago.

A 2011 Australian touring production directed by Des McAnuff premiered as Doctor Zhivago – A New Musical at the Lyric Theatre, Sydney, in 2011. The Sydney cast included Anthony Warlow as Yurii Zhivago, Lucy Maunder as Lara, Taneel Van Zyl as Tonia and Martin Crewes as Pasha. The show received glowing reviews. The production ran from February 19 through April 3, 2011, before travelling to Melbourne where it ran there from April through May 29, 2011. Following Melbourne, a limited run was originally set at Brisbane from July 6 through July 31, but was extended a further two weeks, through August 14, 2011.

A 2012 Seoul production, directed by Des McAnuff, played at the Charlotte Theatre, Seoul, in 2012. The cast included Cho Seung-woo and Hong Kwang-ho as Yurii Zhivago, Jeon Mido and Kim Jiwoo as Lara Guisher, Choi Hyunjoo as Tonia, Kang Pilsuk as Pasha. It began previews on January 25, 2012, opened on January 27, 2012, and closed on June 3, 2012. The second production in South Korea, directed by Matthew Gardiner, played at the Charlotte Theatre from February 27 to May 7, 2018. Ryu Jung-han and Park Eun-tae starred as Yurii Zhivago, Jeon Mi-do and Jo Jung-eun as Lara Guisher, Lee Jung-hwa as Tonia, and Kang Pil-suk as Pasha. Its Finnish debut was in Helsinki City Theatre on October 3, 2013. In August 2014 Doctor Zhivago had another Scandinavian production at Malmö Opera. Sanna Nielsen starred as Lara, Christopher Wollter as Zhivago and Phillip Jalmelid as Pasha. It ran from August 29 to January 31. The show was performed in Swedish.

A 2015 Broadway production, again directed by Des McAnuff, starred Tam Mutu as Yurii Zhivago and Kelli Barrett as Lara Guisher. It began previews at the Broadway Theatre on March 27, 2015, opened on April 21, 2015, and closed on May 10, 2015, due to low ticket sales and a lack of Tony Award nominations. It had played a total of 26 previews and 23 performances. The Original Cast Recording was mixed at Audio Paint Studios in New York City between June 4 and July 12.

In 2016 it had a Hungarian staging at National Theatre of Győr. It was directed by Péter Forgács. In September 2017 Doctor Zhivago played in Poland at Podlaskie Opera and Philharmonic in Bialystok. The show was directed by Jakub Szydlowski. It is still running at the Podlaskie Opera and Philharmonics main stage. In January 2018 a german production opened at the Leipzig Opera, with subsequent productions following in Pforzheim and at the german musical open-air stage Tecklenburg. The production in Leipzig continues, as of 2024 and the Pforzheim production ran from September 2018 to the beginning of 2020. The Tecklenburg production played in Summer of 2019.

A 2019 UK concert was given at Cadogan Hall in London, produced by Lambert Jackson Productions. It starred Ramin Karimloo and Celinde Schoenmaker and was directed by Jordan Murphy, with musical direction by Adam Hoskins.

== Synopsis ==
=== Act I ===
In 1930s Moscow, a woman and a girl stand over the grave of a Russian poet, Dr. Zhivago. The scene shifts to another gravesite, decades earlier, in 1903. A young Yurii Zhivago says goodbye to his father and meets the couple who is taking him in. He becomes friends with the couple's daughter, Tonia, who is around his age. The scene shifts to yet another gravesite, 6 months later, where young Lara and her mother, Mrs. Guishar, mourn the death of Lara's father. Komarovsky, a friend of Lara's mother, buys a dress shop for Mrs. Guishar and hits on Lara, who is still a child. Young Lara, Tonia, and Yurii wonder about what the future will bring. ("Two Worlds")

Years later, in August 1914, Yurii has graduated medical school and is engaged to Tonia. A teenaged Lara has become involved with Pasha, a revolutionary with the Communist party, who asks her to hide his gun. We see Pasha and other student revolutionaries start a protest that is violently broken up by the police. Yurii rushes out to help the wounded protestors.

Meanwhile, Lara, who has been coerced into becoming Komarovsky's lover, is sick of being threatened by him and resolves to kill him. She hides Pasha's gun in her coat and follows Komarovsky to Yurii and Tonia's wedding, where Komarovsky gives a toast ("Komarovsky's Toast"). Lara tries to shoot Komarovsky, interrupting the festivities, but her aim is poor and she hits another man.

Yurii stitches up the wounded man and watches Lara and Komarovsky's conversation from afar. Yurii is intrigued by Lara and wonders what her relationship to Komarovsky is, and why she would shoot him. ("Who Is She?") After telling Komarovsky to stay away from her, Lara flees and Yurii confronts Komarovosky, who tells Yurii not to make an enemy of him.

A few weeks later, at Pasha and Lara's wedding celebration, Pasha and his friends mock the tsar and dance. ("It's a Godsend") Later that night, Lara tells Pasha how she got involved with Komarovsky, and how she shot him because he acted like he owned her and would not stay away. She couldn't keep living like that, and thought killing him was the only way she could regain control of her life. ("When the Music Played") Lara then asks for Pasha's forgiveness, but he rushes out in a rage. Lara goes after him and runs into Yurii; he gives her his umbrella. ("Who Is She? (Reprise)")

At a train station, Yurii is saying goodbye to Anna, Alex, and Tonia before heading to the front as a field medic. He tells a worried Tonia that whenever she misses him, she should watch the moon and think of him, and that he will do the same. Time passes and Yurii sends letters to his family at home, telling Tonia that he is still watching the moon and thinking of her. ("Watch The Moon")

It is now 1915 and the soldiers at the front are trying to hold the front. Pasha, a soldier on the front lines, is trying to convince other soldiers to join the Communist cause. ("Forward!") The scene shifts to a field infirmary, where Lara is reporting for duty as a volunteer nurse. Yurii and Lara recognise each other, and she tells him that her husband's letters stopped when he was serving in this unit, and she came to the front looking for him. Yurii thanks her for trying to shoot Komarovsky, saying that Komarovsky drove his father to suicide. They talk about Yurii's poetry, and he reveals that his most famous poem was inspired by her. Yanko, a young soldier who is badly wounded, walks in and they attempt to treat him, pulling out the bullet. Yurii says that, by some miracle, the boy will live.

Back in Moscow, Tonia reads to her parents and infant son a letter that Yurii has written her; in it, he speaks of Lara and praises her. In the field hospital, the nurses iron shirts and sheets and sing a folk song. The nurses tease Lara about her relationship with the doctor, and she says they're nothing more than friends. Yurii comes in and announces that the war is over. The nurses sing and dance in celebration. ("Somewhere, My Love")

It is October 1917 and the soldiers are trying to evacuate the lines in a supply train. Yurii, Lara and the other nurses are evacuating the wounded onto the same train. Lara and Yurii say goodbye and she tells him that she is not going back to Moscow, but moving to Yuriiatin, a small village in the Ural Mountains, where she was born. She also reveals that she was trying to find Pasha not because she loved him, but because she has done terrible things and does not feel worthy of his love. Looking for him was a way of feeling worthy. Yurii tells her that whatever she did before is how she became who she is, and she is a good person. Lara says they should say goodbye before they do something they will both regret.

Yanko rushes in, severely wounded, saying the Germans broke through the lines. He dies before they can do anything to help him. Yurii and Lara find a letter Yanko wrote to Katarina, the girl he liked, confessing his feelings. They read it out loud and confess their feelings for each other but, instead of kissing, hug. ("Now") Lara rushes out. Somewhere on the front lines, Pasha and the other soldiers wonder why they should die for a cause they do not believe in, and lament the deaths of the soldiers who died for a senseless war. ("Blood on the Snow")

In January 1918, Yurii has made it back to his home in Moscow, but finds it derelict and full of strangers. Yurii is reunited with his family and meets his son, Sasha. He learns that their house is now the headquarters for the Worker's Agricultural Research Institute, and his family has been living in the attic. Yurii is questioned by the Writer's Committee, who want to know what his poetry means. He explains that it means different things to different people, but the committee is unimpressed. Komarovsky, who is at the meeting, implies that Yurii's poetry has to celebrate the Revolution. Four writers who have fallen out of favor walk in, and Yurii recognizes his first publisher among them. He watches in horror as the four writers are hanged. Outside the Committee building, Yurii asks Komarovsky how he can live like that, and Komarovsky says he is trying to protect his friends. Drunk, Komarovsky laments the world they lost. ("Komarovsky's Lament")

Back in the attic, Yurii and his family are starving. They remember their old country estate, which is now abandoned, and decide to move there. Yurii realizes that it is close to Yuriiatin, where Lara lives, and dismisses the idea, saying it is too dangerous for them to move there. Walking the streets of Moscow, Yurii wonders why his path keeps leading him to Lara and why he still thinks of her, despite the fact he has tried to live with honor all his life. He decides that they should move to the estate near Yuriiatin, but vows to stay away from Lara. ("Yurii's Decision")

Two weeks later, Anna has died. Alex, Sasha, Tonia, and Yurii say goodbye to their house and remember all the memories they have shared there. Markel, a servant, rushes in and announces that the tsar and all his children have been killed. Taking advantage of the communists' celebration, they join other families fleeing Moscow on a train. ("In This House") The act ends with communists waving red flags onstage, led by Lara's husband, Pasha, who is very much still alive.

=== Act II ===
It is 1919. In the fields near Yuriiatin, some women—Lara among them—work the earth for spring planting. ("Women And Little Children") A woman called Yelenka says soldiers dragged her husband, Vasya, from their house. Lara tries to comfort Yelenka by saying that Vasya will return, and that part of him will always be there with her. Halfway through the song, she starts remembering Yurii. ("He's There")

The scene changes to the train station in Yuriiatin, where Yurii and his family have arrived from Moscow. Tonia, Sasha, and Alex go off in search of information, while Yurii is approached by Captain Liberius and other soldiers, who force him to go with them. Tonia finds out that Yurii was taken by soldiers who work for Strelnikov, the ruthless Commander of the Red Army Partisans who burns down villages for pleasure.

In Strelnikov's railway car, Yurii is questioned by Strelnikov. The audience finds out that Strelnikov is actually Lara's husband, Pasha. He wants to know if Yurii worked with a nurse called Larissa Antipova during the war, and Yurii says that she was a wonderful nurse. Strelnikov tells him that her husband did not survive the war.

A young peasant is brought in and accused of blowing up a train and spying for the White Army. Though the peasant swears he is innocent, Strelnikov says that all privileged men have to die because they showed no mercy to others during all the years they were in power, which to him is clearly tied to what Komarovsky did to Lara. Strelnikov believes that in order to forge the way for a new world, everything old has to fall. ("No Mercy At All") Tonia comes looking for Yurii and Strelnikov releases him, but orders the peasant thrown into the ravine.

Yelenka tells Lara that she is going on a date with a mystery gentleman, and asks her to lock up the library where they both work. Meanwhile, Alex, Sasha, Yurii, and Tonia open up the cottage and Alex reminisces about the estate back in its golden days. ("In This House (Reprise)") A few days or weeks later, Sasha asks to go to the library because he has read every book in the house already. Yurii reprimands him, saying that they should be content with the books they have.

While Alex tucks Sasha in, Tonia asks Yurii how long he will keep finding excuses not to write. She begs him to follow his heart and go into the library in town to write, but Yurii protests that his heart is here, with his family. Tonia insists that tomorrow he will go to the library first thing in the morning. At the library, Yurii runs into Lara and tells her he tried to stay away but could not. She says it is too dangerous for them to do anything because Strelnikov is her husband and his spies are everywhere. The main characters sing a quintet about how love is both a blessing and a curse, and how it finds you in the most unexpected places. ("Love Finds You")

Yurii tells Lara that he can not keep living a double life, and how he feels it is unfair to both Lara and Tonia. He says that they should not see each other again and Lara accepts his decision, saying she knew it had to end eventually. Leaving Lara's house, Yurii is taken prisoner by the Red Army, who is in need of a doctor. They force him to go with them and do not allow him to say goodbye to his family.

It is 1920 and the Russian Civil War is raging. The stage fills with partisans who throw corpses into a fire pit while women scream. The partisans sing about how they will not stop until the White Army is dead and deserters will be killed. ("Nowhere to Hide")

The scene shifts to the library at Yuriatin, where Lara is working. Tonia comes in with Sasha and tells Lara she is looking for the poetry book "Searching Through the Rain". Tonia says that Yelenka visited her, thinking there were things Tonia should know. Tonia says that she has not heard a word from Yurii since he disappeared and Lara says that she is very sorry. The two women sing about how they are not surprised that the other is kind, but it is still painful for them to meet. In the end they realize that they feel Yurii closer when they are together. ("It Comes As No Surprise")

The stage changes to a camp in Siberia, a year later. Kubarikha, a wild-looking peasant woman, is being questioned by the Red Army, who suspect she has been spying for the Whites. They tell Yurii to question her. In doing so, he finds out that she killed her children, thinking they would be better off dead than tortured by the partisans. She tries to kill herself with a knife but her death is slow and painful, so Yurii shoots her. The soldiers say that he is just like them now, but Yurii denies it. He tries to escape while wondering what he will find when he gets home. ("Ashes and Tears")

Yurii makes it back and finds Lara, who tells him his family had to flee because the Red Army is now in control of Yuriatin, and killing anyone without calloused hands. Lara says they made it out because she begged Strelnikov to let them through. She gives Yurii a letter Tonia left with her. In the letter, Tonia explains how Russia is no longer safe and, after her father's death, they had to leave. She says that she met Lara and wanted to hate her, but could not. Tonia asks him to go outside and watch the moon sometimes, the way they used to. ("Watch the Moon (Reprise)") Lara and Yurii sing about how there is not much time until the Red Army comes looking for him as a deserter, but they can spend that time together. ("On the Edge of Time")

The scene shifts to a military hearing where Strelnikov is being sentenced to death for treason. The lights dim and the scene changes again to the abandoned Kruger mansion where Lara and Yurii are hiding. Komarovsky appears and says that the Red Army is days away and intend to sentence both Yurii and Lara, as his accomplice, to death. He offers them a way out of Russia, but Lara does not want to accept anything from him. Alone with Komarovsky, Yurii tells him that the only way this will work is if he does not go with them, since he will surely be recognised. Komarovsky counters that Lara would rather stay and die with him, so Yurii lies to her and promises that he will join them later down the line. After they leave, Yurii wonders if he made the right decision and hopes Lara will forgive him. ("Now (Reprise)")

The next morning, Strelnikov—who is, again, very much alive—shows up at the Kruger mansion looking for Lara, but she has already left. Yurii and Strelnikov drink together. Strelnikov says he threw his life away to rid the world of everything that corrupted Lara and to revenge her shame, and Yurii counters that Lara was never corrupted. Strelnikov says he loved the Revolution and it betrayed him in the end, but he will be remembered as a saint. He shoots himself offstage. The red flag of Communist Russia is lowered as soldiers march across the stage, singing about the new world they are creating. ("Blood on the Snow (Reprise)")

It is 1930 again. Lara and Katarina, Lara and Yurii's daughter, stand by the grave with a priest, reprising the opening tableau ("On the Edge of Time (Reprise)"),

== Roles and original cast ==
The cast for the Australian premiere of Doctor Zhivago – A New Musical at the Lyric Theatre in Sydney:

| Character | Original Sydney cast (2011) | Original Seoul cast (2012) | Original Broadway cast (2015) | Seoul cast (2018) | Original Leipzig cast (2018) | Białystok cast (2018) | West End Premiere Concert cast (2019) |
|---|---|---|---|---|---|---|---|
| Yurii Zhivago | Anthony Warlow | Cho Seung-woo/Hong Kwang-ho | Tam Mutu | Ryu Jung-han/Park Eun-tae | Jan Amman | Łukasz Zagrobelny / Rafał Drozd | Ramin Karimloo |
| Lara Guishar | Lucy Maunder | Jeon Mi-do/Kim Ji-woo | Kelli Barrett | Jeon Mi-do/Jo Jung-eun | Lisa Habermann | Paulina Janczak / Agnieszka Przekupień / Anna Gigiel | Celinde Schoenmaker |
| Viktor Komarovsky | Bartholomew John | Seo Youngju | Tom Hewitt | Seo Youngju/Choi Min-chul | Patrick Rohbeck | Tomasz Steciuk / Damian Aleksander / Dariusz Kordek | Matthew Woodyatt |
| Pasha Antipov (Strelnikov) | Martin Crewes | Kang Pilsuk | Paul Alexander Nolan | Kang Pilsuk | Björn Christian Kuhn | Tomasz Bacajewski / Marcin Wortmann / Bartłomiej Łochnicki | Charlie McCullagh |
| Tonia Gromeko | Taneel Van Zyl | Choi Hyunjoo | Lora Lee Gayer | Lee Jung-hwa | Hanna Mall | Monika Ziółkowska / Monika Bestecka / Dorota Białkowska | Kelly Mathieson |
| Alexander Gromeko | Peter Carroll | Kim Bonghwan | Jamie Jackson | Kim Bonghwan | Michael Raschle | Tomasz Madej / Grzegorz Pierczyński | Graham Hoadly |
| Anna Gromeko | Trisha Noble | Im Sunae | Jacqueline Antaramian | Lee Kyung-mi | Sabine Töpfer | Anita Steciuk / Anna Sztejner | Emma De-Anne Edwards |
| Young Yurii/Sasha Zhivago | Jamie Ward | | Jonah Halperin | | | | Rhys Bailey |
| Young Yurii | | | | Shin Joo-ah/Lee Joo-ho | | | |
| Young Lara/Katarina | Stephanie Silcock | | Sophia Gennusa | | | | |
| Young Lara | | | | Jeong Ye-Gyo/Lee Jae-eun | | | Isabella Djuve-Wood |
| Young Tonia | | | Ava-Riley Miles | Heo Seo-jin/Park Se-ah | | | Darcy Jacobs |
| Sasha Zhivago | | | | Lee Si-mok/Choi Joon-hee | | | |

== Musical numbers ==
Act I

- "Two Worlds" – Ensemble
- "Komarovsky's Toast – Komarovsky, Alex, Anna and Ensemble
- "Who Is She?" – Yurii
- "It's a Godsend" – Pasha, Tolya, Tusia, Tusia's Fiancée and Students
- "When the Music Played" – Lara
- "Watch the Moon" – Yurii and Tonia
- "Forward!" – Gints, Soldier, Pasha, and Soldiers
- "Somewhere My Love (Lara's Theme)" – Soloist, Lara, Yurii, and Nurses
- "Now" – Lara and Yurii
- "Blood on the Snow" – Pasha and Ensemble
- "Komarovsky's Lament" – Komarovsky
- "Yurii's Decision" – Yurii
- "In This House" – Sasha, Alex, Yurii, Tonia and Ensemble

Act II

- "Women And Little Children/He's There" – Ensemble and Lara
- "No Mercy at All" – Strelnikov
- "In This House (Reprise)" – Alex
- "Love Finds You" – Yurii, Lara, Komarovsky, Strelnikov and Tonia
- "Nowhere to Run" – Liberius and Partisans
- "It Comes As No Surprise" – Tonia and Lara
- "Ashes and Tears" – Yurii and Partisans
- "Watch the Moon (Reprise)" – Tonia
- "On the Edge of Time" – Lara and Yurii
- "Now (Reprise)" – Yurii
- "Blood on the Snow (Reprise)" – Red Army
- "On the Edge of Time (Reprise)" – Katarina, Lara, Yurii and Ensemble

== Recordings ==
An Australian cast album was planned but not released in 2011, however two songs by Maunder and Warlow eventuated and are now able to be viewed on YouTube:

- "Now"
- "On the Edge of Time"

In mid-2015, the Doctor Zhivago (Original Broadway Cast Recording) was issued by Broadway Records. The album features Tam Mutu (Zhivago), Kelli Barrett (Lara), Tom Hewitt (Komarovsky), and Paul Alexander Nolan (Pasha).

A German cast recording was released in December of 2019, featuring all songs of the musical. It is a recording of live performances featuring the original german cast of the Leipzig Opera production.

== Awards and nominations ==
=== Original Australian production ===
| Year | Award | Category | Nominee | Result |
|---|---|---|---|---|
| 2011 | Helpmann Awards | Best Musical | John Frost, Anita Waxman/Tom Dokton, Latitude Link, Power Arts, Chun-Soo Shin, Corcoran Productions | Nominated |
| 2011 | Helpmann Awards | Best Direction of a Musical | Des McAnuff | Nominated |
| 2011 | Helpmann Awards | Best Choreography in a Musical | Kelly Divine | Nominated |
| 2011 | Helpmann Awards | Best Male Actor in a Musical | Anthony Warlow | Nominated |
| 2011 | Helpmann Awards | Best Female Actor in a Musical | Lucy Maunder | Nominated |
| 2011 | Helpmann Awards | Best Male Actor in a Supporting Role in a Musical | Martin Crewes | Nominated |
| 2011 | Helpmann Awards | Best Female Actor in a Supporting Role in a Musical | Taneel Van Zyl | Nominated |
| 2011 | Green Room Awards | Design | Nick Eltis (Technical Director) | Nominated |
| 2011 | Green Room Awards | Design | Michael Scott-Mitchell (Set) | Nominated |
| 2011 | Sydney Theatre Awards | Judith Johnson Award for Best Performance by an Actress in a Musical | Lucy Maunder | Nominated |
| 2011 | Sydney Theatre Awards | Best Performance in a Supporting Role in a Musical | Martin Crewes | Won |

=== Original Broadway production ===
| Year | Award | Category | Nominee | Result |
|---|---|---|---|---|
| 2015 | Outer Critics Circle Awards | Outstanding Featured Actor in a Musical | Paul Alexander Nolan | Nominated |
| 2015 | Drama League Award | Distinguished Performance | Tam Mutu | Nominated |
