= Doctor Zhivago (TV series) =

2002 miniseries directed by Giacomo Campiotti

- DVD cover
- Genre: Action romance and drama
- Based on: Doctor Zhivago by Boris Pasternak
- Screenplay by: Andrew Davies
- Directed by: Giacomo Campiotti
- Starring: Hans Matheson; Keira Knightley; Sam Neill; Kris Marshall
- Theme music composer: Ludovico Einaudi
- Countries of origin: United Kingdom; United States; Germany
- Original language: English
- No. of series: 1
- No. of episodes: 3

Production
- Producers: Ane Pivcevic; Hugh Warren
- Cinematography: Blasco Giurato
- Editor: Joe Walker
- Running time: 225 minutes
- Production companies: Granada Television; PBS; WGBH Boston
- Budget: £7 million

Original release
- Network: ITV
- Release: 24 November – 8 December 2002

Doctor Zhivago is a 2002 British television drama serial directed by Giacomo Campiotti and starring Hans Matheson, Keira Knightley and Sam Neill. The teleplay by Andrew Davies is based on the 1957 novel of the same title by Boris Pasternak. It is set primarily against the backdrop of the Russian Revolution of 1917 and the subsequent Russian Civil War of 1917–1923. At its core is Lara Guishar Antipova, a young woman from Moscow who has a profound effect on three men who become enamoured with her.

The serial is the second English-language screen adaptation of the book, following the 1965 feature film. It was produced by Granada Television, with co-funding from the American PBS station WGBH Boston and the German company Evision. It was first broadcast on ITV in the United Kingdom, beginning on 24 November 2002. In the United States, it aired as part of Masterpiece Theatre on 2 and 9 November 2003.

== Plot ==
=== Part I ===
In Tsarist Russia in the early 1900s, Victor Komarovsky, an unctuous, wealthy businessman with political connections, is involved in a casual affair with Lara's bourgeois dressmaker mother Amalia, who encourages her teenage daughter to accept his invitation to dinner in an attempt to retain his financial support of her household. Initially, Lara is repelled by the thought, but she finally accepts because of the pressure he exerts on her. This eventually leads her to have a forceful relationship with him.

Meanwhile, Lara is also involved in a relationship with the idealistic reformer Pasha Antipov who drifts into left-wing extremism after being wounded by sabre-wielding Cossacks during a peaceful demonstration. Pasha goes to Lara, whom he wants to marry, to treat his wound and he asks her to hide a gun he picked up at the demonstration.

The title character is poet and doctor Yuri Zhivago, who first sees Lara from the window of a café. The two meet when Zhivago and his mentor are called to treat Amalia after she attempts suicide in response to her daughter's relationship with Victor Komarovsky. When Komarovsky learns of Lara's intention to marry Pasha, he tries to dissuade her and then rapes her. In revenge, Lara takes the pistol she has been hiding for Pasha and shoots Komarovsky at a Christmas Eve party, but wounds another man by accident. Zhivago and Lara encounter each other again when he is called to tend to the wounded victim. Komarovsky insists no action be taken against Lara, who is escorted out. Upon meeting face to face, Zhivago and Komarovsky take an instant dislike to each other as Zhivago realises that Komarovsky knew his now dead father. Komarovsky warns Zhivago to stay away from Lara.

Although enraged and devastated by Lara's affair with Komarovsky, Pasha marries her and they have a daughter named Katya. Zhivago eventually marries his cousin, Tonya Gromeko, with whom he was raised after his father, who was involved in business dealings with Komarovsky, killed himself in 1897. Together they have a son named Sasha.

In 1915, with World War I in progress, Yuri Zhivago is conscripted and becomes an army doctor. He and Lara are reunited over a year later in a makeshift field hospital, where she is serving as a nurse while searching for her missing husband. The two fall in love but do not consummate their relationship. Together they run a hospital for several months, during which radical changes take place throughout Russia due to the fall of the Tsar and subsequent Bolshevik takeover of the country. Lara leaves the hospital to return to her village, while Zhivago returns to Moscow.

=== Part II ===
After Russia's involvement with the War ends in 1917, Zhivago returns to Moscow and to his wife Tonya, son Sasha, and his uncle Alexander, whose house in Moscow has been divided into tenements by the new Soviet government. Zhivago briefly returns to work at a hospital where his old friend, Misha Gordon, is now director. Despite supporting the revolution, Zhivago is suspected of having bourgeois tendencies as he refuses to comply with the official line on the prevalence of epidemics. Gordon arranges for travel passes and documents for Zhivago and his family to escape from the continuing unrest in Moscow to the far away Gromeko estate at Varykino in the Ural Mountains. Zhivago, Tonya, Sasha, and Alexander board a heavily guarded cattle truck train. They are informed that they will be traveling through the contested territory, secured by the infamous Bolshevik commander named Strelnikov.

While the train is stopped at a siding, Zhivago wanders away. He stumbles across the armoured train of Strelnikov. Yuri recognises Strelnikov as the former Pasha Antipov. After a tense interview, Strelnikov informs Yuri that Lara is now living in the town of Yuriatin, then occupied by the anti-communist White Army. He allows Zhivago to return to his family.

The family lives a peaceful life in Varykino for the next year and a half until Zhivago finds Lara in nearby Yuriatin, and they surrender to their long-repressed feelings and begin an affair. When Tonya becomes pregnant, Yuri breaks off with Lara, only to be abducted and conscripted into service by Communist partisans.

Lara is called to serve as the midwife when Tonya is ready to deliver her second child, and Tonya realises who she is. As the civil war draws to a close, Zhivago deserts the red partisans and treks across the mountains to Lara's house in Yuriatin, where she nurses him back to health. Meanwhile, Tonya, her two children, and her father have returned to Moscow.

Pursued by Komarovsky, now a leader in the Communist Party, Zhivago, Lara and her daughter flee to Varykino. Months later, Komarovsky, still obsessed with Lara, arrives and offers them safe passage out of Russia. They initially refuse, but Komarovsky persuades Zhivago that it is in Lara's best interests to leave because of her connection to Strelnikov, who has fallen from favour and lost his position in the Red Army. Zhivago convinces Lara, who is expecting their child, to leave with Komarovsky, telling her he will follow her shortly.

Strelnikov, now a hunted man, arrives at Varykino in search of his family soon after they leave with Komarovsky. Zhivago assures him that Lara and his daughter are safe, and Strelnikov kills himself.

Zhivago returns to Moscow and learns his wife, son, and father-in-law were deported and their location is unknown. Several years later, while sitting in a café, he sees a young boy who reminds him of himself as a child passing on the street with his mother, and he recognises Lara. Before he can reach the pair, he suffers a fatal heart attack. Lara brings young Yuri to view his father's body, and as the two near their home, she realises that the NKVD is waiting to arrest her. Pretending that they are playing a game, she urges her son to run away as quickly as he can, with the book of poems Zhivago wrote over the years before she surrenders to the authorities.

== Cast ==
- Hans Matheson ..... Yuri Zhivago
- Keira Knightley ..... Lara Guishar Antipova
- Sam Neill ..... Victor Komarovsky
- Kris Marshall ..... Pasha Antipov/Strelnikov
- Alexandra Maria Lara ..... Tonya Gromeko Zhivago
- Bill Paterson ..... Alexander Gromeko
- Celia Imrie ..... Anna Gromeko
- Anna Rust ..... Katya Antipova
- Anne-Marie Duff ..... Olya Demina
- Maryam d'Abo ..... Amalia Guishar
- Hugh Bonneville ..... Andrey Zhivago
- Gregg Sulkin ..... Seryozha
- Jan Travnicek ..... Sasha Zhivago

== Production ==
In discussing adapting the Boris Pasternak novel for television, screenwriter Andrew Davies revealed the task was "daunting because the book is reckoned to be a masterpiece and the film is a great movie and one that I admire very much. Robert Bolt is the king of epic screenplay writers in my book. But as I got further into the book I kept thinking that I didn't agree with Robert Bolt about how to tell the story... and I began to feel much more excited." He added, "It was also a relief to find so much in the book that hadn't found its way into the first movie and could make great drama.... I thought the film does the spectacle really well. Rather surprisingly, it also explains the politics very well, but I thought it could do a better job on the relationships. It's probably a bit controversial, but I thought we could say more about Lara and Yuri and how they get together; about Lara's extraordinary situation at the beginning of the story and Yuri having a dreadful start to his life with his parents dying. None of these things really came out in the movie, but they are there in the book. I think that if they look at both versions now, people will probably think that this version in a lot of ways works better for our time. It's more contemporary. I think they'll find the performances are more subtle yet speak to us in our time. Maybe my script will seem out of date in 20 years time because a lot of them do, but watching the original film, I think the central performances look stilted and dated now."

Initially, Davies and director Giacomo Campiotti clashed about how to present the material. Davies recalled, "The first couple of weeks after Giacomo joined this project were horrendous for me because Zhivago has always been one of his very favorite books. He has always dreamed about filming it and has his own interpretation in his head. I can actually remember thinking after one long, long day, where we just didn't agree about a single thing, that it wasn't going to work—it's either got to be him or me. Somehow, we arrived at a compromise and I have almost forgotten what we were arguing about now, as now we are both very pleased with the script. I always knew that he would make it look beautiful because he has got a poet's vision and now, having seen the rushes and some cut footage, I feel like he is my favourite director of all time. Everything is delightful now... Giacomo Campiotti's direction makes it extraordinary."

Because so much of the story is set in the winter, it was crucial to film the series where it was likely snow would be available. Due to budget constraints, Russia, Norway, and Finland were deemed too expensive. Alberta, Canada, was considered until the producers learned the previous year's snowfall had been minimal. Other Canadian provinces were rejected because the production crew was told it would be too cold to operate the needed equipment. Slovakia, where a 95% chance of snow was predicted, was selected for the March filming, and there was a blizzard two days before the shooting began. But it quickly melted, and eventually, the scenic designers had to utilise 1000 bags of artificial snow. Producer Hugh Warren recalled, "We had all the expense of going to Slovakia as well as the trouble of crossing the border, and then there was no snow. It was more than a little ironic."

Costume designer Annie Symons and her staff of thirty had to create more than 3000 costumes and 35,000 individual items of clothing for the cast. The characters of Zhivago and Lara each had at least 90 costume combinations, and six other principal characters had an average of fifteen changes each. By the time principal photography ended, a total of 984 yards of fabric, 300,000 yards of thread, 1 million buttons, and 7,000 safety pins were used.

== Critical reception ==
Alessandra Stanley of The New York Times said, "By trying so hard for authenticity, this Doctor Zhivago drains the story of much of its lyricism.... Mr. Lean's grander, glossier version was a closer match to the romantic spirit of the novel's hero.... The Davies version is engrossing but more for the harrowing scenes set in the civil war after the revolution than for the novel's legendary love triangle. Black-and-white archival photographs – Moscow slums, newspaper shots of soldiers marching off to World War I – are interspersed throughout the film and slowly bleed into a scene of the television show. The visual trick gives the series a quasi-documentary feel and is quite effective. Yet Mr. Davies takes the same liberties with Pasternak's text as the original film did, focusing on the love story and discarding a lot of the politics, secondary plots, and literary sidetracks.... This Doctor Zhivago can be watched as a useful history lesson and as a cautionary show business tale: it is a lot easier to adapt a Jane Austen novel than it is to remake a film by David Lean."

Brian Lowry of Variety observed, "Some will rightfully pine for Maurice Jarre's Oscar-winning score, Julie Christie and Omar Sharif, yet this somewhat less epic take on Boris Pasternak's book is a creditable version, featuring outstanding performances and considerable romance. And hey, kids, it sure beats reading the Cliffs Notes."

In the Sunday Telegraph John Preston commented "This version treated its audience as intelligent and assumed they had the ability to follow a story that unfolded visually rather than verbally", adding that its "first and most self-evident virtue was that it looked more like a movie than a traditional telly drama. There was a real richness of texture here" and noted "...a wealth of other cleverly wrought, yet essentially simple touches". He was less impressed with Andrew Davies's script and Keira Knightley's Lara, but commended Hans Matheson "terrific as the grown-up Yuri Zhivago – intense, playful, assured" and Giacomo Campiotti's "bravura direction".

Tom Jicha of the South Florida Sun-Sentinel called it "a stunning success" and continued, "Davies' screenplay is involving, the cinematography is captivating, the costuming and set designs evoke a sense of time and place, and the top-of-the-marquee performances are world-class." He concluded, "Doctor Zhivago is a hefty production, which demands a four-hour, commercial-free commitment from its audience. But the reward is a richly layered character study and love story, worthy of the franchise under which it airs."

Melanie McFarland of the Seattle Post-Intelligencer graded the series B+ and commented it "manages to maintain true to the main storyline, streamlining incidental characters to keep the film from becoming too unwieldy, which takes some effort considering the book's rich language and numerous characters.... Even so, this version, though a little better-paced than the original, is still fairly sluggish. Given the book, perhaps that's unavoidable."

== Awards and nominations ==
In the UK, the serial was nominated for the BAFTA Award for Best Drama Serial but lost to Shackleton. Giacomo Campiotti was nominated Best New Director and Annie Symons was nominated for Best Costume Design.

In the US, the serial was nominated for the Satellite Award for Best Miniseries but lost to Angels in America.

== DVD release ==
Acorn Media released a Region 1 DVD on 4 November 2003. It is in anamorphic widescreen format with an English audio track and subtitles. Bonus features include extensive interviews with the cast and crew, a photo gallery, a biography of Boris Pasternak, and cast filmographies.
