= Doctor Zhivago (novel) =

1957 novel by Boris Pasternak

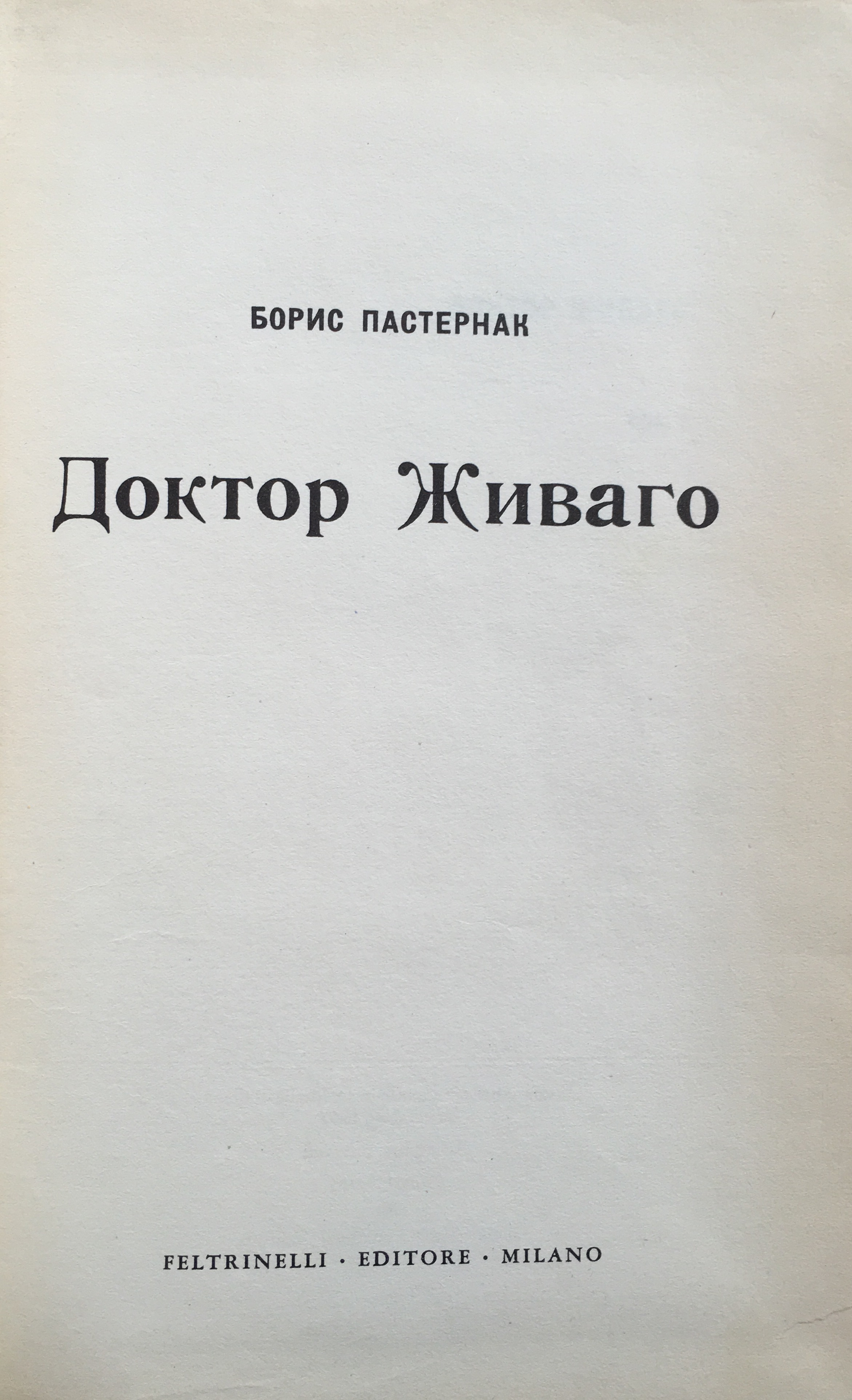
- Front page of the first edition
- Author: Boris Pasternak
- Original title: Доктор Живаго
- Language: Russian
- Genre: Historical, Romantic novel
- Publisher: Feltrinelli (first edition), Pantheon Books
- Publication date: 23 November 1957
- Publication place: Italy
- Media type: Print (Hardback & Paperback)
- Pages: 592 (Pantheon)
- ISBN: 0-679-77438-6 (Pantheon)

Doctor Zhivago (/ʒɪˈvɑːɡoʊ/ zhiv-AH-goh; Russian: До́ктор Жива́го [doktər ʐɨˈvaɡə]) is a novel by Russian poet, author and composer Boris Pasternak, first published in 1957 in Italy. The novel is named after its protagonist, Yuri Zhivago, a physician and poet, and takes place between the Russian Revolution of 1905 and World War II.

Owing to the author's critical stance on the October Revolution, Doctor Zhivago was refused publication in the USSR. At the instigation of Giangiacomo Feltrinelli, the manuscript was smuggled to Milan and published in 1957. Pasternak was awarded the Nobel Prize in Literature the following year, an event that embarrassed and enraged the Communist Party of the Soviet Union.

The novel was made into a film by David Lean in 1965, and since then has twice been adapted for television, most recently as a miniseries for Russian TV in 2006. The novel Doctor Zhivago has been part of the Russian school curriculum since 2003, where it is read in 11th grade.

== Plot summary ==
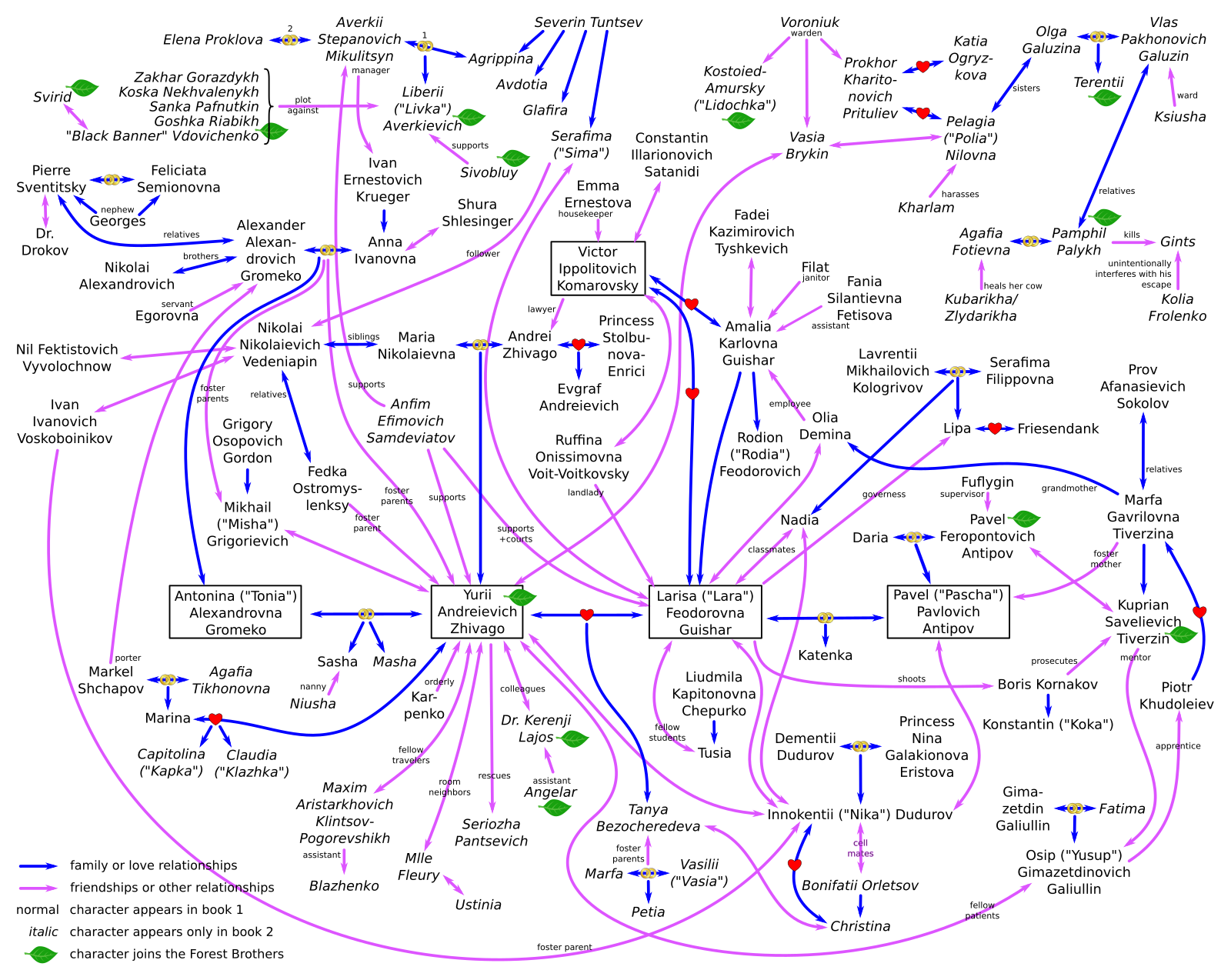
Character map of Doctor Zhivago

The plot of Doctor Zhivago is long and intricate; it can be difficult to follow for two reasons. Firstly, Pasternak employs many characters, who interact with each other throughout the book in unpredictable ways. Secondly, as is common in narrative Russian literature, he frequently introduces a character by one of his/her three names, then subsequently refers to that character by another of the three names or a nickname, without expressly stating that he is referring to the same character.

=== Part 1 ===
The novel opens in Imperial Russia, 1902, during a Russian Orthodox funeral liturgy, or panikhida, for Yuri's mother, Marya Nikolaevna Zhivago. Having long ago been abandoned by his father, Yuri is taken in by his maternal uncle, Nikolai Nikolaevich Vedenyapin, a philosopher and former Orthodox priest who now works for the publisher of a progressive newspaper in a provincial capital on the Volga River. Yuri's father, Andrei Zhivago, was once a wealthy member of Moscow's merchant gentry, but has squandered the family's fortune in Siberia through debauchery and carousing.

The next summer, Yuri (who is 11 years old) and Nikolai Nikolaevich travel to Duplyanka, the estate of Lavrenty Mikhailovich Kologrivov, a wealthy silk merchant. They are there not to visit Kologrivov, who is abroad with his wife, but to visit a mutual friend, Ivan Ivanovich Voskoboinikov, an intellectual who lives in the steward's cottage. Kologrivov's daughters, Nadya (who is 15 years old) and Lipa (who is younger), are also living at the estate with a governess and servants. Innokenty (Nika) Dudorov, a 13-year-old boy who is the son of a convicted terrorist has been placed with Ivan Ivanovich by his mother and lives with him in the cottage. As Nikolai Nikolaevich and Ivan Ivanovich are strolling in the garden and discussing philosophy, they notice that a train passing in the distance has come to a stop in an unexpected place, indicating that something is wrong. On the train, an 11-year-old boy named Misha Grigorievich Gordon is traveling with his father. They have been on the train for three days. During that time, a kind man had given Misha small gifts and had talked for hours with his father, Grigory Osipovich Gordon. However, encouraged by his attorney, who was traveling with him, the man had become drunk. Eventually, the man had rushed to the vestibule of the moving train car, pushed aside the boy's father, opened the door and thrown himself out, killing himself. Misha's father had then pulled the emergency brake, bringing the train to a halt. The passengers disembark and view the corpse while the police are called. The deceased's lawyer stands near the body and blames the suicide on alcoholism.

=== Part 2 ===
During the Russo-Japanese War (1904–1905), Amalia Karlovna Guichard arrives in Moscow from the Urals with her two children: Rodion (Rodya) and Larissa (Lara). Guichard's late husband was a Belgian who had been working as an engineer for the railroad and had been friends with Victor Ippolitovich Komarovsky, a lawyer and "cold-blooded businessman". Komarovsky sets them up in rooms at the seedy Montenegro hotel, enrolls Rodion in the Cadet Corps and enrolls Lara in a girls' high school. The girls' school is the same school that Nadya Kologrivov attends. On Komarovsky's advice, Amalia invests in a small dress shop. Amalia and her children live at the Montenegro for about a month before moving into the apartment over the dress shop. Despite an ongoing affair with Amalia, Komarovsky begins to groom Lara behind her mother's back.

In early October, the workers of the Moscow-Brest railroad line go on strike. The foreman of the station is Pavel Ferapontovich Antipov. His friend Kiprian Savelyevich Tiverzin is called into one of the railroad workshops and stops a workman from beating his apprentice (whose name is Osip (Yusupka) Gimazetdinovich Galiullin). The police arrest Pavel Ferapontovich for his role in the strike. Pavel Ferapontovich's boy, Patulya (or Pasha or Pashka) Pavlovich Antipov, comes to live with Tiverzin and his mother. Tiverzin's mother and Patulya attend a demonstration which is attacked by dragoons, but they survive and return home. As the protestors flee the dragoons, Nikolai Nikolaevich (Yuri's uncle) is standing inside a Moscow apartment, at the window, watching the people flee. Some time ago, he moved from the Volga region to Petersburg, and at the same time moved Yuri to Moscow to live at the Gromeko household. Nikolai Nikolaevich had then come to Moscow from Petersburg earlier in the Fall, and is staying with the Sventitskys, who were distant relations. The Gromeko household consists of Alexander Alexandrovich Gromeko, his wife Anna Ivanovna, and his bachelor brother Nikolai Alexandrovich. Anna is the daughter of a wealthy steel magnate, now deceased, from the Yuriatin region in the Urals. They have a daughter Tonya.

In January 1906, the Gromekos host a chamber music recital at their home one night. One of the performers is a cellist who is a friend of Amalia's, and her next-door neighbor at the Montenegro. Midway through the performance, the cellist is recalled to the Montenegro because, he is told, someone there is dying. Alexander Alexandrovich, Yuri and Misha come along with the cellist. At the Montenegro, the boys stand in a public corridor outside one of the rooms, embarrassed, while Amalia, who has taken poison, is treated with an emetic. Eventually, they are shooed into the room by the boarding house employees who are using the corridor. The boys are assured that Amalia is out of danger and, once inside the room, see her, half-naked and sweaty, talking with the cellist; she tells him that she had "suspicions" but "fortunately it all turned out to be foolishness." The boys then notice, in a dark part of the room, a girl (it is Lara) asleep on a chair. Unexpectedly, Komarovsky emerges from behind a curtain and brings a lamp to the table next to Lara's chair. The light wakes her up and she, unaware that Yuri and Misha are watching, shares a private moment with Komarovsky, "as if he were a puppeteer and she a puppet, obedient to the movements of his hand." They exchange conspiratorial glances, pleased that their secret was not discovered and that Amalia did not die. This is the first time Yuri sees Lara, and he is fascinated by the scene. Misha then whispers to Yuri that the man he is watching is the same one who got his father drunk on the train shortly before his father's suicide.

=== Part 3 ===
In November 1911, Anna Ivanovna Gromeko becomes seriously ill with pneumonia. At this time, Yuri, Misha, and Tonya are studying to be a doctor, philologist, and lawyer respectively. Yuri learns that his father had a child, a boy named Yevgraf, by Princess Stolbunova-Enrizzi.

The narrative returns to the Spring of 1906. Lara is increasingly tormented by Komarovsky's control over her, which has now been going on for six months. In order to get away from him, she asks her classmate and friend Nadya Laurentovna Kologrivov to help her find work as a tutor. Nadya says she can work for Nadya's own family because her parents happen to be looking for a tutor for her sister Lipa. Lara spends more than three years working as a governess for the Kologrivovs. Lara admires the Kologrivovs, and they love her as if she were their own child. In her fourth year with the Kologrivovs, Lara is visited by her brother Rodya. He needs 700 rubles to cover a debt. Lara says she will try to get the money, and in exchange demands Rodya's cadet revolver along with some cartridges. She obtains the money from Kologrivov. She does not pay the money back, because she uses her wages to help support her boyfriend Pasha Antipov (see above) and his father (who lives in exile), without Pasha's knowledge.

We move forward to 1911. Lara visits the Kologrivovs' country estate with them for the last time. She is becoming discontented with her situation, but she enjoys the pastimes of the estate anyway, and she becomes an excellent shot with Rodya's revolver. When she and the family return to Moscow, her discontent grows. Around Christmastime, she resolves to part from the Kologrivovs, and to ask Komarovsky for the money necessary to do that. She plans to kill him with Rodya's revolver should he refuse her. On 27 December, the date of the Sventitsky's Christmas party, she goes to Komarovsky's home but is informed that he is at a Christmas party. She gets the address of the party and starts toward it, but relents and pays Pasha a visit instead. She tells him that they should get married right away, and he agrees. At the same moment that Lara and Pasha are having this discussion, Yuri and Tonya are passing by Pasha's apartment in the street, on their way to the Sventitskys. They arrive at the party and enjoy the festivities. Later, Lara arrives at the party. She knows no one there other than Komarovsky, and is not dressed for a ball. She tries to get Komarovsky to notice her, but he is playing cards and either does not notice her or pretends not to. Through some quick inferences, she realizes that one of the men playing cards with Komarovsky is Kornakov, a prosecutor of the Moscow court. He prosecuted a group of railway workers that included Kiprian Tiverzin, Pasha's foster father.

Later, while Yuri and Tonya are dancing, a shot rings out. There is a great commotion and it is discovered that Lara has shot Kornakov (not Komarovsky) and Kornakov has received only a minor wound. Lara has fainted and is being dragged by some guests to a chair; Yuri recognizes her with amazement. Yuri goes to render medical attention to Lara but then changes course to Kornakov because he is the nominal victim. He pronounces Kornakov's wound to be "a trifle", and is about to tend to Lara when Mrs. Sventitsky and Tonya urgently tell him that he must return home because something was not right with Anna Ivanovna. When Yuri and Tonya return home, they find that Anna Ivanovna has died.

=== Part 4 ===
Komarovsky uses his political connections to shield Lara from prosecution. Lara and Pasha marry, graduate from university, and depart by train for Yuriatin.

The narrative moves to the second autumn of the First World War. Yuri has married Tonya and is working as a doctor at a hospital in Moscow. Tonya gives birth to their first child, a son. Back in Yuriatin, the Antipovs also have their first child, a girl named Katenka. Although he loves Lara deeply, Pasha feels increasingly stifled by her love for him. In order to escape, he volunteers for the Imperial Russian Army. Lara starts to work as a teacher in Yuriatin. Sometime later, she leaves Yuriatin and goes to a town in Galicia, to look for Pasha. The town happens to be where Yuri is now working as a military doctor. Elsewhere, Lt. Antipov is taken prisoner by the Austro-Hungarian Army, but is erroneously declared missing in action. Wounded by artillery fire, Yuri is sent to a battlefield hospital in the town of Meliuzeevo, where Lara is his nurse. Galiullin (the apprentice who was beaten in Part 2) is also in Lara's ward, recovering from injuries. He is now a lieutenant in Pasha's unit; he informs Lara that Pasha is alive, but she doubts him. Lara gets to know Yuri better but is not impressed with him. At the very end of this Part, it is announced in the hospital that there has been a revolution.

=== Part 5 ===
After his recovery, Zhivago stays on at the hospital as a physician. This puts him at close quarters with Lara. They are both (along with Galiullin) trying to get permission to leave and return to their homes.

In Meliuzeevo, a newly arrived commissar for the Provisional Government, whose name is Gintz, is informed that a local military unit has deserted and is camped in a nearby cleared forest. Gintz decides to accompany a troop of Cossacks who have been summoned to surround and disarm the deserters. He believes he can appeal to the deserters' pride as "soldiers in the world's first revolutionary army." A train of mounted Cossacks arrives and the Cossacks quickly surround the deserters. Gintz enters the circle of horsemen and makes a speech to the deserters. His speech backfires so badly that the Cossacks who are there to support him gradually sheath their sabres, dismount and start to fraternize with the deserters. The Cossack officers advise Gintz to flee; he does, but he is pursued by the deserters and brutally murdered by them at the railroad station.

Shortly before he leaves, Yuri says goodbye to Lara. He starts by expressing his excitement over the fact that "the roof over the whole of Russia has been torn off, and we and all the people find ourselves under the open sky" with true freedom for the first time. Despite himself, he then starts to clumsily tell Lara that he has feelings for her. Lara stops him and they part. A week later, they leave by different trains, she to Yuriatin and he to Moscow. On the train to Moscow, Yuri reflects on how different the world has become, and on his "honest trying with all his might not to love [Lara]."

=== Parts 6 to 9 ===
Following the October Revolution and the subsequent Russian Civil War, Yuri and his family decide to flee by train to Tonya's family's former estate (called Varykino), located near the town of Yuriatin in the Ural Mountains. During the journey, he has an encounter with Army Commissar Strelnikov ("The Executioner"), a fearsome commander who summarily executes both captured Whites and many civilians. Yuri and his family settle in an abandoned house on the estate. Over the winter, they read books to each other and Yuri writes poetry and journal entries. Spring comes and the family prepares for farm work. Yuri visits Yuriatin to use the public library, and during one of these visits sees Lara at the library. He decides to talk with her, but finishes up some work first, and when he looks up she is gone. He gets her home address from a request slip she had given the librarian. On another visit to town, he visits her at her apartment (which she shares with her daughter). She informs him that Strelnikov is indeed Pasha, her husband. During one of Yuri's subsequent visits to Yuriatin they consummate their relationship. They meet at her apartment regularly for more than two months, but then Yuri, while returning from one of their trysts to his house on the estate, is abducted by men loyal to Liberius, commander of the "Forest Brotherhood", the Bolshevik guerrilla band.

=== Parts 10 to 13 ===
Liberius is a dedicated Old Bolshevik and highly effective leader of his men. However, Liberius is also a cocaine addict, loud-mouthed and narcissistic. He repeatedly bores Yuri with his long-winded lectures about the glories of socialism and the inevitability of its victory. Yuri spends more than two years with Liberius and his partisans, then finally manages to escape. After a grueling journey back to Yuriatin, made largely on foot, Yuri goes into town to see Lara first, rather than to Varykino to see his family. In town, he learns that his wife, children, and father-in-law fled the estate and returned to Moscow. From Lara, he learns that Tonya delivered a daughter after he left. Lara assisted at the birth and she and Tonya became close friends. Yuri gets a job and stays with Lara and her daughter for a few months. One of Lara's friends, Sima Tuntseva, gives her a lengthy sermon on Mary Magdalene in the style of Tolstoy. Eventually, a townsman delivers a letter to Yuri from Tonya, which Tonya wrote five months before and which has passed through innumerable hands to reach Yuri. In the letter, Tonya informs him that she, the children, and her father are being deported, probably to Paris. She says "The whole trouble is that I love you and you do not love me," and "We will never, ever see each other again." When Yuri finishes reading the letter, he has chest pains and faints.

=== Part 14 ===
In the dead of winter, Lara and Yuri move back to the estate at Varykino where there are literal wolves at the door every night. Komarovsky reappears. Having used his influence within the CPSU, Komarovsky has been appointed Minister of Justice of the Far Eastern Republic, a Soviet puppet state in Siberia. He offers to smuggle Yuri and Lara outside Soviet soil. They initially refuse, but Komarovsky states, falsely, that Pasha Antipov is dead, having fallen from favor with the Party. Stating that this will place Lara in the Cheka's crosshairs, he persuades Yuri that it is in her best interests to leave for the East. Yuri convinces Lara to go with Komarovsky, telling her that he will follow her shortly. Meanwhile, the hunted General Strelnikov (Pasha) returns for Lara. Lara, however, has already left with Komarovsky. After expressing regret over the pain he has caused his country and loved ones, Pasha commits suicide. Yuri finds his body the following morning.

=== Part 15 ===
After returning to Moscow, Zhivago's health declines; he marries another woman, Marina, and fathers two children with her. He also plans numerous writing projects which he never finishes. Yuri leaves his new family and his friends to live alone in Moscow and work on his writing. However, after living on his own for a short time, he dies of a heart attack while riding the tram. Meanwhile, Lara returns to Russia to learn of her dead husband and ends up attending Yuri Zhivago's funeral. She persuades Yuri's half-brother, who is now NKVD General Yevgraf Zhivago, to assist her in her search for a daughter that she had conceived with Yuri, but had abandoned in the Urals. Ultimately, however, Lara disappears, believed arrested during Joseph Stalin's Great Purge and dying in the Gulag, "a nameless number on a list that was later misplaced."

=== Epilogue ===
During World War II, Zhivago's old friends Nika Dudorov and Misha Gordon meet up. One of their discussions revolves around a local laundress named Tanya, a besprizornaya, or war orphan, and her resemblance to both Yuri and Lara. Tanya tells both men of the difficult childhood she has had due to her mother abandoning her in order to marry Komarovsky. Much later, the two men meet over the first edition of Yuri Zhivago's poems.

== Background ==
=== Influences and inspiration ===
The novel has been described as a semi-autobiography, or autobiographical "partially in the external but mostly in internal sense", containing autobiographical inspiration; some of its characters were inspired by people close to the author: for example, Pasternak's mistress Olga Ivinskaya served as the inspiration for the character of Lara, and in one of his letters, the author wrote that Ivinskaya was "Lara in my book"; other characters of the novel received the features of the author himself. In the 1930s, Pasternak wrote works with autobiographical features on the theme of the Revolution, like Spektorsky, whose plot focuses on a poet whose attitude towards historical events is similar to Pasternak's, and the novella The Last Summer; both works may be early attempts by Pasternak to write about the Revolution and the Civil War, as he did in Doctor Zhivago.

Efim Etkind believed that one influence on Doctor Zhivago was the novel The Life of Klim Samgin by Maxim Gorky. Etkind wrote that it could serve as a "negative background" to Zhivago, and that Doctor Zhivago may be a "response" to Gorky's novel. Pasternak expressed his admiration for this novel in a letter to Gorky in 1927.

=== Soviet censorship ===
Although it contains passages written in the 1910s and 1920s, Doctor Zhivago was not completed until 1955. The novel was submitted to the literary journal Novy Mir ("Новый Мир") in 1956. However, the editors rejected Pasternak's novel because of its implicit rejection of socialist realism. The author, like Zhivago, showed more concern for the welfare of individuals than for the welfare of society. Soviet censors construed some passages as anti-Soviet. They also objected to Pasternak's subtle criticisms of Stalinism, Collectivization, the Great Purge, and the Gulag.

=== Translations ===
First Italian edition cover of book, published in November 1957 by Giangiacomo Feltrinelli

Pasternak sent several copies of the manuscript in Russian to friends in the West. On 23 November 1957, Italian publisher Giangiacomo Feltrinelli arranged for the novel to be smuggled out of the Soviet Union by Sergio D'Angelo. Upon handing his manuscript over, Pasternak quipped, "You are hereby invited to watch me face the firing squad." Despite desperate efforts by the Union of Soviet Writers to prevent its publication, Feltrinelli published an Italian translation of the book in November 1957. So great was the demand for Doctor Zhivago that Feltrinelli was able to license translation rights into eighteen different languages well in advance of the novel's publication. The Communist Party of Italy expelled Feltrinelli from their membership in retaliation for his role in the publication of a novel they felt was critical of communism.

A French translation was published by Éditions Gallimard in June 1958, with an English translation being published in September 1958.

=== Russian text published by CIA ===
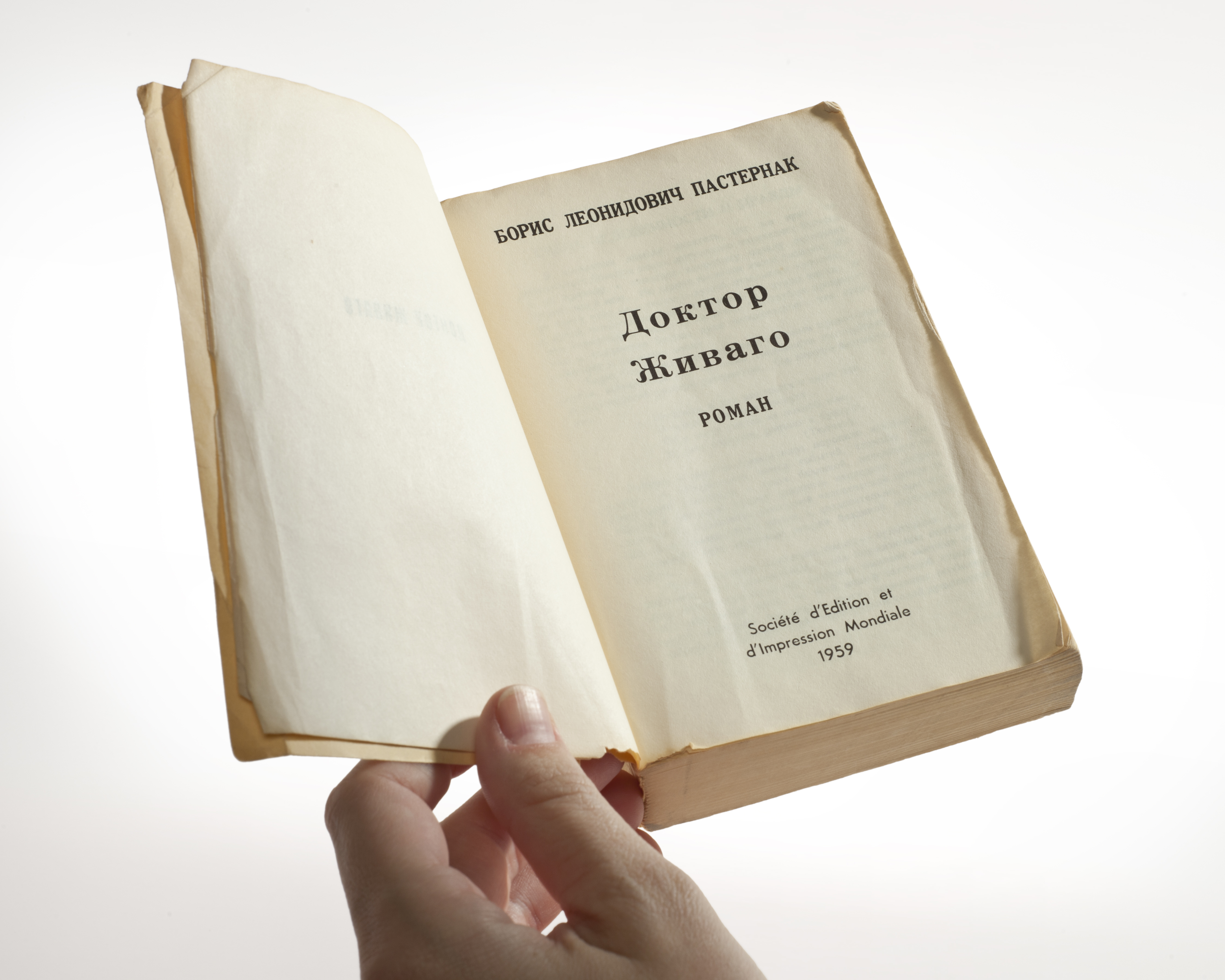
Copy of the miniature Russian-language edition of Doctor Zhivago, covertly published by the CIA in 1959 as weapon against the Soviet regime. The front cover and the binding identify the book in Russian; the back of the book states that it was printed in France. Important note: the miniature paperback edition was in 1959, that is after 1958 Nobel Award, not to be confused with the hardcover book published by Mouton.

The U.S. Central Intelligence Agency realized that the novel presented an opportunity to embarrass the Soviet government. An internal memo lauded the book's "great propaganda value": not only did the text have a central humanist message, but the Soviet government's having suppressed a great work of literature could make ordinary citizens "wonder what is wrong with their government".

The CIA set out to publish 1,000 copies of a Russian-language hardcover edition at Mouton Publishers of the Hague in early September 1958, and arranged for 365 of them, in Mouton's trademark blue linen cover, to be distributed at the Vatican pavilion at the 1958 Brussels world's fair.

The printing by Mouton Publishers of the 1,000 copies of an adulterated Russian-language version, organized by the CIA, had typos and truncated storylines, and it was illegal, because the owner of the manuscript was Giangiacomo Feltrinelli, who later put his name on the Mouton edition.

Author Ivan Tolstoi claims that the CIA lent a hand to ensure that Doctor Zhivago was submitted to the Nobel Committee in its original language, in order for Pasternak to win the Nobel prize and further harm the international credibility of the Soviet Union. He repeats and adds additional details to Fetrinelli's claims that CIA operatives intercepted and photographed a manuscript of the novel and secretly printed a small number of books in the Russian language. Recently released CIA documents do not show that the agency's efforts in publishing a Russian-language edition were intended to help Pasternak win the Nobel, however.

Anna Sergeyeva-Klyatis, a Russian philologist, also contributed her research about the history of publications, following the publication of Lazar Fleishman's book Russian Emigration Discovers "Doctor Zhivago", where she thought that the only possible conclusion was that the pirated edition of Doctor Zhivago was initiated by one of the biggest émigré organizations in Europe: the Central Association of Postwar Émigrées. While CAPE was known to engage in anti-Soviet activities, the printing of this edition was not an imposition of its own political will but rather a response to the spiritual demands of the Russian emigration that was greatly stirred by the release of Pasternak's novel in Italian without an original Russian edition.

=== Nobel Prize in Literature ===
In 1958 Pasternak wrote to Renate Schweitzer,

Some people believe the Nobel Prize may be awarded to me this year. I am firmly convinced that I shall be passed over and that it will go to Alberto Moravia. You cannot imagine all the difficulties, torments, and anxieties which arise to confront me at the mere prospect, however unlikely, of such a possibility... One step out of place—and the people closest to you will be condemned to suffer from all the jealousy, resentment, wounded pride and disappointment of others, and old scars on the heart will be reopened...

On 23 October 1958, Boris Pasternak was announced as the winner of the 1958 Nobel Prize in Literature. The citation credited Pasternak's contribution to Russian lyric poetry and for his role in, "continuing the great Russian epic tradition". On 25 October, Pasternak sent a telegram to the Swedish Academy:

Infinitely grateful, touched, proud, surprised, overwhelmed.

On 26 October, the Literary Gazette ran an article by David Zaslavski entitled, "Reactionary Propaganda Uproar over a Literary Weed".

Acting on direct orders from the Politburo, the KGB surrounded Pasternak's dacha in Peredelkino. Pasternak was not only threatened with arrest, but the KGB also vowed to send his mistress Olga Ivinskaya back to the gulag, where she had been imprisoned under Stalin. It was further hinted that, if Pasternak traveled to Stockholm to collect his Nobel Medal, he would be refused re-entry to the Soviet Union.

As a result, on 29 October Pasternak sent a second telegram to the Nobel Committee:

In view of the meaning given the award by the society in which I live, I must renounce this undeserved distinction which has been conferred on me. Please do not take my voluntary renunciation amiss.

The Swedish Academy announced:

This refusal, of course, in no way alters the validity of the award. There remains only for the Academy, however, to announce with regret that the presentation of the Prize cannot take place.

=== Soviet revenge ===
Despite his decision to decline the award, the Soviet Union of Writers continued to denounce Pasternak in the Soviet press. Furthermore, he was threatened at the very least with formal exile to the West. In response, Pasternak wrote directly to Soviet Premier Nikita Khrushchev, "Leaving the motherland will mean equal death for me. I am tied to Russia by birth, by life and work." After being ousted from power in 1964, Khrushchev read the novel and felt great regret for having banned the book at all.

As a result of this and the intercession of Indian Prime Minister Jawaharlal Nehru, Pasternak was not expelled from his homeland.

Ultimately, Bill Mauldin produced a political cartoon lampooning the Soviet State's campaign against Boris Pasternak. The cartoon depicts Pasternak and another convict splitting trees in the snow. In the caption, Pasternak says, "I won the Nobel Prize for literature. What was your crime?" The cartoon won the Pulitzer Prize for Editorial Cartooning in 1959.

=== Doctor Zhivago after author's death ===
Pasternak died of lung cancer in his dacha in Peredelkino on the evening of 30 May 1960. He first summoned his sons, and in their presence said, "Who will suffer most because of my death? Who will suffer most? Only Oliusha will, and I haven't had time to do anything for her. The worst thing is that she will suffer." Pasternak's last words were, "I can't hear very well. And there's a mist in front of my eyes. But it will go away, won't it? Don't forget to open the window tomorrow."

Shortly before his death, a priest of the Russian Orthodox Church had given Pasternak the last rites. Later, in the strictest secrecy, an Orthodox funeral liturgy, or Panikhida, was offered in the family's dacha.

Despite only a small notice appearing in the Literary Gazette, handwritten notices carrying the date and time of the funeral were posted throughout the Moscow subway system. As a result, thousands of admirers traveled from Moscow to Pasternak's civil funeral in Peredelkino. According to Jon Stallworthy, "Volunteers carried his open coffin to his burial place and those who were present (including the poet Andrey Voznesensky) recited from memory the banned poem 'Hamlet'."

One of the dissident speakers at the graveside service said, "God marks the path of the elect with thorns, and Pasternak was picked out and marked by God. He believed in eternity and he will belong to it... We excommunicated Tolstoy, we disowned Dostoyevsky, and now we disown Pasternak. Everything that brings us glory we try to banish to the West... But we cannot allow this. We love Pasternak and we revere him as a poet... Glory to Pasternak!"

Until the 1980s, Pasternak's poetry was only published in heavily censored form. Furthermore, his reputation continued to be pilloried in state propaganda until Mikhail Gorbachev proclaimed perestroika.

In 1988, after decades of circulating in samizdat, Doctor Zhivago was finally serialized in the pages of Novy Mir, which had changed to a more anti-communist position than in Pasternak's lifetime. The following year, Pasternak's son Yevgeny Borisovich was at last permitted to travel to Stockholm to collect his father's Nobel Prize Medal. At the ceremony, cellist Mstislav Rostropovich performed a Bach composition in honor of his fellow Soviet dissident.

The novel has been part of the Russian school curriculum since 2003, where it is taught in 11th grade.

== Themes ==
=== Loneliness ===
In the shadow of all this political change, everything seems governed by the human longing for companionship. Zhivago and Pasha, in love with the same woman, both traverse Russia in these volatile times in search of stability. They are both involved in the changing times that Russia faced in the first half of the 20th century, yet the common theme and the motivating force behind all their movement is a want of a steady home life. When we first meet Zhivago he is being torn away from everything he knows. He is sobbing and standing on the grave of his mother. We bear witness to the moment stability is destroyed in his life and the rest of the novel is his attempts to recreate the security stolen from him at such a young age. After the loss of his mother, Zhivago develops a longing for what Freud called the "maternal object" (feminine love and affection) in his later romantic relationships with women. His first marriage, to Tonya, is not one born of passion but from friendship. In a way, Tonya takes on the role of the mother-figure that Zhivago always sought but lacked. This, however, was not a romantic tie; while he feels loyal to her throughout his life, he never could find happiness with her, for their relationship lacks the passion that was integral to his relationship to Lara.

=== Disillusionment with revolutionary ideology ===
In the beginning of the novel, between the 1905 Russian Revolution and World War I, characters freely debate different philosophical and political ideas including Marxism, but after the revolution and the state-enforced terror of war communism, Zhivago and others cease to talk politics. Zhivago, a stubborn non-conformist, rants within himself at the "blindness" of revolutionary propaganda and grows exasperated with "the conformity and transparency of the hypocrisy" of his friends who adhere to the prevailing dogma. Zhivago's mental and even physical health crumble under the strain of "a constant, systematic dissembling" by which citizens, rather than thinking for themselves, are expected to "show [themselves] day by day contrary to what [they] feel." In the epilogue, in which Russia is enveloped in World War II, the characters Dudorov and Gordon discuss how the war united Russia against a real enemy, which was better than the preceding days of the Great Purge when Russians were turned against one another by the deadly, artificial ideology of totalitarianism. This reflects Pasternak's hope that the trials of the Great Patriotic War would, to quote translator Richard Pevear, "lead to the final liberation that had been the promise of the [Russian] Revolution from the beginning."

=== Coincidence and the unpredictability of reality ===
In contrast to the socialist realism that was imposed as the official artistic style of the Soviet Union, Pasternak's novel relies heavily on unbelievable coincidences (a reliance for which the plot was criticized). Pasternak uses the frequently intersecting paths of his cast of characters not only to tell several different people's stories over the decades-long course of the novel, but also to emphasize the chaotic, unpredictable nature of the time period in which it is set, and of reality more generally. In the end, immediately before his death, Zhivago has a revelation of "several existences developing side by side, moving next to each other at different speeds, and about one person's fate getting ahead of another's in life, and who outlives whom." This reflects the crisscrossing journeys of characters over decades, and represents the capricious chance governing their lives.

== Literary criticism ==
Edmund Wilson wrote of the novel: "Doctor Zhivago will, I believe, come to stand as one of the great events in man's literary and moral history." V. S. Pritchett wrote in the New Statesman that the novel is "[t]he first work of genius to come out of Russia since the revolution." When the novel came out in Italian, Anders Österling, the then permanent secretary of the Swedish Academy which awards the Nobel Prize in Literature, wrote in January 1958:

A strong patriotic accent comes through, but with no trace of empty propaganda... With its abundant documentation, its intense local color and its psychological frankness, this work bears convincing witness to the fact that the creative faculty in literature is in no sense extinct in Russia. It is hard to believe that the Soviet authorities might seriously envisage forbidding its publication in the land of its birth.

Some literary critics "found that there was no real plot to the novel, that its chronology was confused, that the main characters were oddly effaced, that the author relied far too much on contrived coincidences." Vladimir Nabokov, who had celebrated Pasternak's books of poetry as works of "pure, unbridled genius", however, considered the novel to be "a sorry thing, clumsy, trite and melodramatic, with stock situations, voluptuous lawyers, unbelievable girls, romantic robbers and trite coincidences." On the other hand, some critics praised it for being things that, in the opinion of translator Richard Pevear, it was never meant to be: a moving love story, or a lyrical biography of a poet in which the individual is set against the grim realities of Soviet life. Pasternak defended the numerous coincidences in the plot, saying that they are "traits to characterize that somewhat willful, free, fanciful flow of reality." In response to criticism in the West of his novel's characters and coincidences, Pasternak wrote to Stephen Spender:

Whatever the cause, reality has been for me like a sudden, unexpected arrival that is intensely welcome. I have always tried to reproduce this sense of being sent, of being launched... there is an effort in my novels to represent the whole sequence (facts, beings, happenings) as a great moving entity... a developing, passing, rolling, rushing inspiration. As if reality itself had freedom of choice... Hence the reproach that my characters were insufficiently realized. Rather than delineate, I was trying to efface them. Hence the frank arbitrariness of the "coincidences". Here I wanted to show the unrestrained freedom of life, its very verisimilitude contiguous with improbability.

== Names and places ==
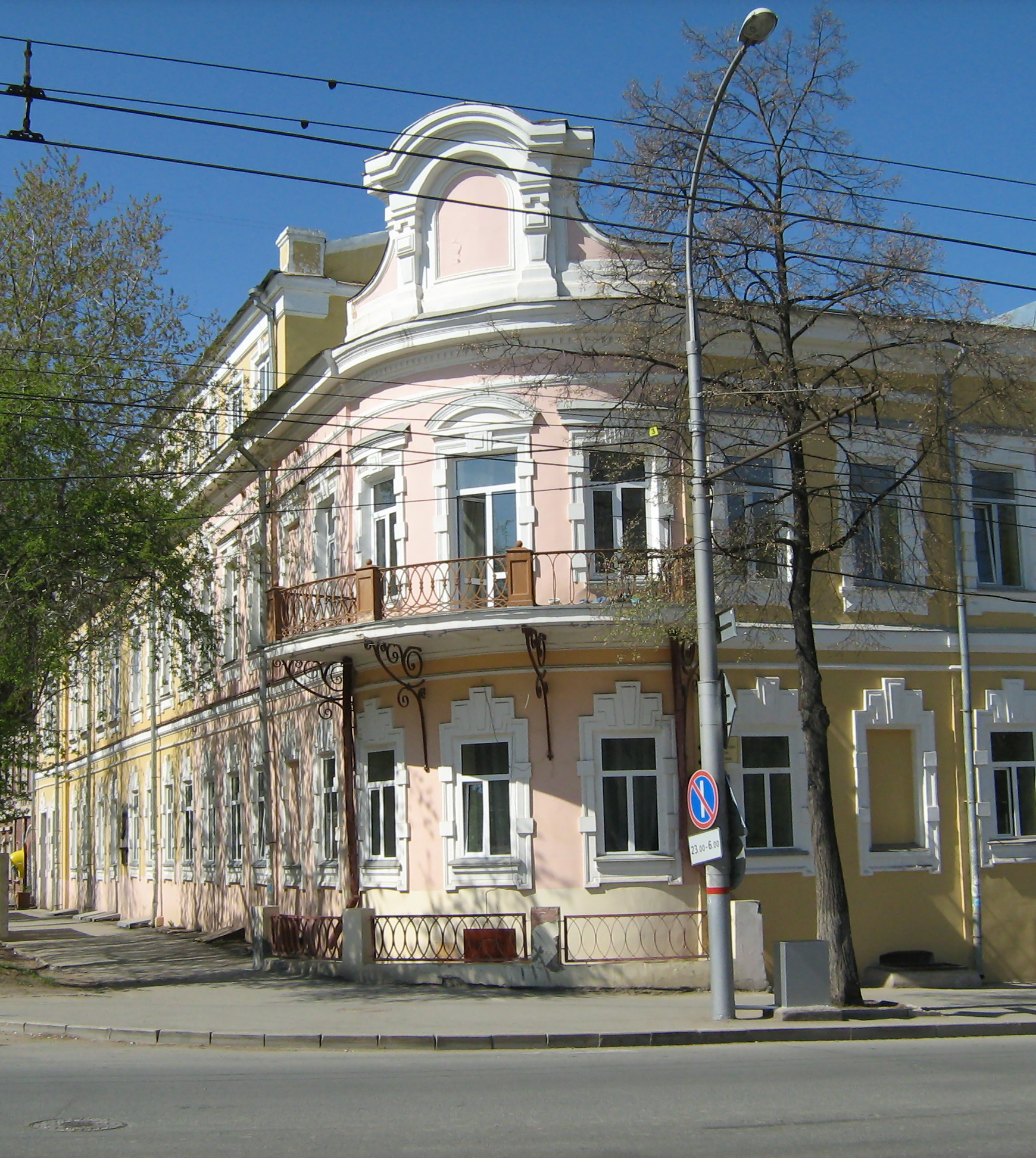
Pushkin Library, Perm

- Zhivago (Живаго): the Russian root zhiv means "alive".
- Larissa: a Greek name suggesting "bright, cheerful".
- Komarovsky (Комаровский): komar (комар) is the Russian for "mosquito".
- Pasha (Паша): the diminutive form of "Pavel" (Павел), the Russian rendering of the name Paul.
- Strelnikov (Стрельников): Pasha/Pavel Antipov's pseudonym, strelok means "the shooter"; he is also called Rasstrelnikov (Расстрельников), which means "executioner".
- Yuriatin (Юрятин): the fictional town was based upon Perm, near which Pasternak had lived for several months in 1916. This can be understood in Russian as "Yuri's town".
- The public reading room at Yuriatin was based on the Pushkin Library, Perm.

== Adaptations ==
=== Television ===
- A 1959 Brazilian television series (currently unavailable) was the first screen adaptation.
- A 2002 British television serial, Doctor Zhivago stars Hans Matheson, Keira Knightley, Alexandra Maria Lara, and Sam Neill. It was broadcast by ITV in the UK in November 2002 and on Masterpiece Theatre in the US in November 2003.
- A 2006 Russian mini-series produced by Mosfilm. Its total running time is over 500 minutes (8 hours and 26 minutes).

=== Film ===
- The most famous adaptation of Doctor Zhivago is the 1965 film adaptation by David Lean, featuring the Egyptian actor Omar Sharif as Zhivago and English actress Julie Christie as Lara, with Geraldine Chaplin as Tonya and Alec Guinness as Yevgraf. The film was commercially successful and won five Oscars. It is still considered a classic film, remembered also for Maurice Jarre's score, which features the romantic "Lara's Theme". Though faithful to the novel's plot, depictions of several characters and events are noticeably different, and many side stories are dropped.

=== Theatre ===
- A musical called Doktor Zhivago premiered in Perm, Russia in the Urals on 22 March 2007, and remained in the repertoire of Perm Drama Theatre throughout its 50th Anniversary year.
- Doctor Zhivago is a musical adaptation of the novel. It originally premiered as Zhivago at the La Jolla Playhouse in 2006. Ivan Hernandez played the title role. It was revised and premiered as Doctor Zhivago at the Lyric Theatre, Sydney in February 2011, starring Anthony Warlow and Lucy Maunder and produced by John Frost. The musical features a score by Lucy Simon, a book by Michael Weller, and lyrics by Michael Korie and Amy Powers (Lizzie Borden and songs for Sunset Boulevard). Both the 2006 and the 2011 productions were directed by Des McAnuff.
- The Swedish-language musical Zjivago premiered at Malmö Opera in Sweden on 29 August 2014.
- A musical was produced in Japan by the Takarazuka Revue in February 2018.

== Translations into English ==
- Max Hayward and Manya Harari (1958)
  - In 1958, Publishers Weekly listed this translation as the best-selling novel of the year.
- Richard Pevear and Larissa Volokhonsky (2010)
- Nicolas Pasternak Slater, illustrated with 68 pictures by Leonid Pasternak (2019)
