= Yuri Zhivago =

Fictional character in Doctor Zhivago

- Doctor Zhivago character
- Created by: Boris Pasternak
- Portrayed by: Omar Sharif (original); Tarek Sharif (young)

In-universe information
- Full name: Yuri Andreievich Zhivago
- Gender: Male
- Title: Doctor
- Occupation: Physician
- Spouse: Tonya Gromeko

Yuri Andreievich Zhivago is the protagonist and title character of the 1957 novel Doctor Zhivago by Boris Pasternak.

Yuri Zhivago, a doctor and poet, is sensitive nearly to the point of mysticism. Zhivago's idealism and principles stand in contrast to the successive brutality of World War I, the February and October Revolutions, the subsequent Russian Civil War, and the Red Terror. A major theme of the novel is how mysticism and idealism are destroyed by both the Bolsheviks and the White Army alike, as both sides commit horrible atrocities. Zhivago is married to Tonya Gromeko, his adoptive sister, with whom he has a son and a daughter. He has an affair with Lara Antipova, wife of Pasha Antipov/Strelnikov, who bears him a daughter. Much of Zhivago's poetry is inspired by Lara.

== In other media ==
Yuri Zhivago has been portrayed by actors such as Omar Sharif in the 1965 film, Hans Matheson in the 2002 television series, and Oleg Menshikov in the 2006 television series.

== Reception ==
The character was well received.
