= The American Epic Sessions =

- Theatrical release poster
- Directed by: Bernard MacMahon
- Written by: Bernard MacMahon; Duke Erikson; Allison McGourty
- Produced by: Allison McGourty; Duke Erikson; Bernard MacMahon
- Cinematography: Vern Moen
- Edited by: Dan Gitlin
- Music by: Bernard MacMahon; Duke Erikson
- Production companies: Lo-Max Films, Wildwood Enterprises
- Distributed by: BBC, PBS
- Release date: June 6, 2017
- Running time: 116 minutes (theatrical version)
- Country: United States
- Language: English

The American Epic Sessions is a documentary film in which an engineer restores the fabled long-lost first electrical sound recording system from 1925, and twenty contemporary artists pay tribute to the momentous machine by attempting to record songs on it for the first time in 80 years. The film was directed and co-written by Bernard MacMahon and stars Nas, Alabama Shakes, Elton John, Willie Nelson, Merle Haggard, Jack White, Taj Mahal, Ana Gabriel, Pokey LaFarge, Beck, Ashley Monroe, Los Lobos, The Avett Brothers, Bettye LaVette, Rhiannon Giddens, Raphael Saadiq, Edie Brickell, Steve Martin, and others.

The film employed a diverse line-up of performers both ethnically and musically to represent the breadth of cultures that were first given a national platform through the invention of this recording machine. It also explored the extent to which the recordings made on it in the 1920s influenced and inspired contemporary music.

== Development ==
The film involved a decade of work restoring the machine, which was pieced together from spare parts scattered across the globe, in order to better understand the origins of modern recording technology, and the influence the machine had on world culture. The machine would go on to put sound on motion pictures.

The film recreated a live 1920s-style recording session. MacMahon filmed the live performances like a Hollywood musical in single unedited takes to focus on the music, the sound the machine produced, and the impact it had on the artists performances. The technical aspects of the recording were covered in sequences interspersed throughout the film where, with rigorously filmed tracking shots and extreme close-ups using a macro lens, the viewer could observe and understand the inner workings of the machine.

The film received widespread acclaim for its direction, musical performances, sound and cinematography. The film won the Discovery Award and the Audience Award at the Calgary International Film Festival, was nominated for a Primetime Emmy Award, Bernard MacMahon and Allison McGourty were nominated as Breakthrough Talents by the British Academy Film Awards and won a Grammy Award for the Alabama Shakes performance of “Killer Diller Blues”.

== Film synopsis ==
The film's title sequence begins with a series of cards announcing that “In 1925 the invention of electrical sound recording revolutionized the phonograph industry. In 1926 this equipment was taken across America to record rural music for the very first time – blues, gospel, Cajun, country, Hawaiian, Native American and more…Only a few of these machines were made, and none are known to have survived. All the musical performances in this film are live. The audio you hear is taken directly from the discs it was recorded to, with no editing or enhancements.” Thereafter a series of contemporary musicians enter an exact replica of a 1920s recording studio and record songs live onto a single microphone attached to the first electrical recording system and a pulley-driven disc cutting lathe.

Their performances are filmed in single takes. Some of the performers are seen arranging their songs and Elton John is seen actually writing his song live on camera. These scenes are interspersed with interviews with engineer Nicholas Bergh explaining how the machine works, its cultural and technological importance, how the 1920s field recording sessions were organized and the observations of the contemporary performers participating. Some of the artists’ performances are prefaced by ethereal scenes where the camera explores the dark corridors of the empty studio, accompanied by the recordings that were made on the machine 90 years ago distantly playing in the background, while the camera zooms in on framed portraits of those long-deceased musicians hanging on the walls of the studio. These ghostly scenes are followed by a contemporary artist covering the same song.

Numerous potentially fatal disasters befall the machine during the sessions including the pulley cable that holds the weight breaking, which Jack White repairs at an upholstery shop, the amplifier overheating and blowing up during an Avett Brothers recording and a fraught 13 take session where Beck's 12-piece choir battle with an overdriven and distorting microphone. To capture the eclecticism of a 1920s recording session, a very diverse selection of artists is seen participating in the film, from Hispanic performers like Ana Gabriel and Los Lobos to Hawaiian steel guitar bands like The Hawaiians and Cajun acts like The Lost Bayou Ramblers, pop singers like Elton John, rock and roll groups like Alabama Shakes and Jack White and hip hop artists like Nas. The film culminates with the last filmed performance of Merle Haggard and Willie Nelson, recording a song Haggard has written for the film, “The Only Man Wilder Than Me” followed by a cover of Bob Wills’ “Old Fashioned Love” closing the film with the lines; “Although the land may change to sea, There'll be no change in me, I've got that old fashioned love in my heart.”

== Origins ==
MacMahon stated that the idea for the film was born out of a desire to understand on a practical level how the pivotal 1920s recordings were made, “you can only truly appreciate history, and understand why things were done the way they were done, by actually going out and doing them yourself.” Two initial sessions were filmed at the producers' expense prior to the commissioning of the films by the BBC and PBS. These were with Frank Fairfield and The Americans. This was done, according to MacMahon, “as a proof of concept and to ensure the look and style of the film was indelibly stamped from the outset with our own artistic sensibilities and thereby limit the level of outside interference.” He also added “The American Epic Sessions film was the carrot to get the three historical films made. This meant we shot Sessions way ahead of the production of the rest of the films to engender an incentive to tackle the vast undertaking that was the historical films. Making Sessions was like the Olympic 100 metres. The historic films were the marathon.” MacMahon has commented that he prefers to shoot the endings of films first so he can determine the pace to the climax more effectively.

== Film production ==
=== Location ===
The film was shot in one main location: Vox Recording Studios in Hollywood, California. Originally built in 1936 and named Electro-Vox, the studio is “said to be the oldest private recording studio in the world”. The studio was emptied of all current sound recording equipment and furniture, then dressed in period fixtures and fittings before bringing in the Western Electric Recording System.

The set designer attempted to make the studio feel as close to how a studio would have felt in the 1920s in an attempt to give the musicians the feeling of being taken back in time to an actual recording session as described in the American Epic documentary series. The film had one secondary location, Sophie's Seat Design in Hollywood, California, which was featured when former upholsterer, Jack White, took the broken belt of the recording lathe to be re-sewn.

=== Artist selection ===
The artists were principally chosen by MacMahon in consultation with the film's producers and co-writers Duke Erikson and Allison McGourty, and executive producers T Bone Burnett and Jack White. The performers were chosen for their musical and ethnic diversity and their ability to record in a rigorous and demanding manner. MacMahon insisted on having three previously unrecorded acts at the sessions; The Americans, Christine Pizutti and Jerron “Blind Boy” Paxton.

=== Song selection ===
The musicians were encouraged to record both a vintage song and a song they had written. MacMahon and Erikson compiled a list of old songs that they wanted to feature in the film and in some cases specifically chose songs for particular performers; “Mal Hombre” for Ana Gabriel, “On the Road Again” for Nas, “Tomi Tomi” for the Hawaiians and “Nobody's Dirty Business” for Bettye LaVette. Other performers researched the period and selected their own vintage songs; Jack White unearthed “Matrimonial Intentions”, the Avett Brothers chose “Jordan Am a Hard Road” and Rhiannon Giddens chose “One Hour Mama”.

Most of the performers recorded two songs although the duration of the film precluded all these performances appearing in the finished film. Some performers wrote songs specifically for the film like Merle Haggard who composed “The Only Man Wilder Than Me” as a duet for him and Willie Nelson to perform. Elton John arrived at the studio with a lyric entitled “Two Fingers of Whiskey” that Bernie Taupin had written specifically for the film. Elton John then proceeded to write the melody live on camera and arrange the song with Jack White and recorded the song live direct to disc without leaving the room during the whole process. All the performances in the film and many additional songs not featured in the film were released by Columbia Records/Lo-Max on Music from The American Epic Sessions: Original Motion Picture Soundtrack.

=== Score ===
A non-diegetic score was occasionally used in the film. There were four main instances, a section revealing how the Western Electric Amplifier Rack and Microphone work, a section discussing the social impact the Western Electric Recording System had on the world and its eventual demise, the arrival of the final two musicians in the film, Willie Nelson and Merle Haggard, and finally, the closing credits. The score was written by Duke Erikson and Bernard MacMahon and performed by Duke Erikson and Chris Wagoner.

=== Cinematography ===
The film was storyboarded extensively by MacMahon in advance of the shoot along with detailed diagrams of the lighting designs. He explained; “I’d have an idea in advance of what the set-up might be musically so I painted out lighting design and storyboards in advance. Those were in a constant state of flux,” Producer Allison McGourty commented “It was like a theatrical production—Bernard designed different lighting for each session to give [each song] a different feel.” MacMahon said that he wanted the film to look like a painting “I wanted a rich color palette so it looks like a Velázquez painting,” he said, with the lighting falling off to heavy shadows in the corners of the picture to conceal the dolly tracks in the studio.

“My inspiration in filming The American Epic Sessions was Fred Astaire and Gene Kelly films, where they perform these dances in a single, continuous take. I wanted to let the audience know that they were looking at a live performance, so almost all of the performances are shot in one continuous take.”

— Bernard MacMahon

MacMahon filmed principally on an Arri Alexa on a camera dolly. The decision to have the camera in a constant state of subtle motion was designed to give the film a musical rhythm and momentum. As the musicians in the film were forced to record their tracks in a single unaltered take, MacMahon decided the camera should do the same and choreographed complex single take moves to mirror the tempo of the music whilst landing on the musicians the moment their part came to the foreground. McGourty explained “he would rehearse with our house band before the performers arrived, and rehearse the camera crew with all the dolly moves so they would know when the lead vocalist would be singing; then it would go into a chorus, then the guitar or the banjo. There was a huge amount of preparation, because it was not just the music that had to be captured in one three-minute take—we had to capture the whole experience on film, and make it look natural, and do it smoothly enough that we didn’t interfere with the performers.” MacMahon said he took some of his inspiration from John J. Mescall's cinematography on James Whale productions like the Bride of Frankenstein. MacMahon wanted viewers to feel like they were standing in the studio watching the performance, so the camera never moved lower than a crouch or higher than someone standing on their tip toes, nor did the camera zoom in closer than a guest in the studio would stand. A test session was filmed with Frank Fairfield and The Americans to perfect the cinematic style of the film. In stark contrast to this policy was his use of extreme macro photography when the film discusses the recording system. Shot using macro lenses, the cinematography used in these sections was designed to take the viewer inside the inner workings of the 1920s Western Electric amplifier and microphone and the 1920s Scully cutting lathe, and to give the recording system a larger than life persona. Exterior shots of the dilapidated and nondescript studio building were occasionally employed with pedestrians walking by oblivious to the activities going on inside. MacMahon said this was to “remind people that behind every door there are a thousand stories.”

=== Sound recording ===
==== Western electric recording system ====
In 1925, Western Electric launched a new electronic recording process that could capture the nuances of the human voice and subtle instrumental shadings that had eluded the old acoustic systems. The machine revolutionized the recording of music because it could record every type of instrument and voice whereas the acoustic horn recordings that predated it were severely limited in what they could record effectively.

"This equipment is the beginning of things being wired. It's the blueprint for the next 60 years of audio recording."

— Nicholas Bergh

The new system consisted of an electrical microphone whose signal was amplified by a 6’ amplifier rack. The amplified signal was then sent to a cutting head that cut a wax disc on a Scully lathe that was pulley powered by a 100Ib brass weight. In the 1920s as radio took over the pop music business, record companies were forced to expand their markets and leave their studios in major cities in search of new musical styles and markets. They organized field recording sessions across America and recorded blues, gospel, Cajun, country, Hawaiian, Native American and many other hitherto unrecorded types of music using the Western Electric system which technologically made these recordings possible. These recordings would go on to have vast cultural impact in North America and the rest of the world. The recording system was leased out to the major record labels who had to pay a royalty on every record sold to Western Electric. The success of music recordings led to the system being leased by the major Hollywood studios for talking pictures after initial resistance. Although there are no records of how many of these machines were leased out to the record companies, estimates range from a dozen to two dozen. Prior to the release of The American Epic Sessions the recording system was mysterious and had not been seen in almost 80 years. Engineer Nicholas Bergh explained, “I had two mentors when I was getting into audio who started their careers in the late 1930s in America and both of them told me that even by the late ‘30s this system was basically mythical and they had never seen any components of it or even pictures. So even in ten years it had basically disappeared off the face of the earth.”

==== Restoring the recording system ====
At the outset of the pre-production of the American Epic documentary series there were no known photos or film footage of the full Western Electric system. Locating visual documentation became of paramount importance to the producers. Midway through the research on the film, MacMahon and McGourty were introduced to sound engineer Nicholas Bergh as a possible collaborator. After a year of getting to know each other, Bergh revealed he had spent almost a decade attempting to restore the Western Electric system. Bergh had scavenged spare parts from around the world, in places as far away as Japan and Europe, in his quest to complete the system. “All the individual items had to come from different places, often thousands of miles apart” he explained “I was able to confirm my progress by studying the few crude music studio pictures that started to show up.” However, Bergh was missing a vital part of the set up – the pulley driven Scully lathe. On an exploratory trip to the Scully family, looking for photographs, MacMahon and McGourty discovered perhaps the only surviving 1924 Scully lathe in the family's basement and persuaded them to loan it to the production. MacMahon then set about persuading Bergh to engineer a session with contemporary artists recording on the system. Bergh was nervous about doing this as “moving that [the recording system] into a production environment, that was a major change.”

“The idea was from day one that it had to be real. The validity of the film would lie in, once that needle drops, you’re actually hearing the sound of what they’re recording. There were no production mics involved.”

— Bernard MacMahon

MacMahon persuaded Bergh to participate in a test session with two new artists so as to limit the pressure. Frank Fairfield and The Americans were the first musicians to record on the system in over 80 years. “The results were satisfactory” MacMahon explained “but Nick wanted to operate the machine more effectively”. Producer and co-writer Allison McGourty gained access to the AT&T archive which kept the research documents for Western Electric. Within the archive they located engineers’ casebooks and accounting forms that gave some more clues as to how to operate the machine. They also managed to locate 1920s photographs of the recording system being used in the Western Electric laboratory. Armed with this new information Bergh agreed to MacMahon's plan to attempt to film a full recording session with twenty artists. MacMahon hired T Bone Burnett and Jack White to produce and arrange songs for the sessions and booked all the artists.

==== Recording process ====
The Western Electric system was a live direct-to-disc recording method. The earliest condenser microphone was wired into a six-foot amplifier rack comprising a preamplifier, a first level meter, a monitor amplifier, a line amplifier to drive the cutting head which etched the grooves onto a wax disc on the turntable of a Scully cutting lathe that was rotated by a pulley system and a 100lb weight. The performers gathered around the microphone and carefully positioned themselves to achieve the correct balance. The performers were cued into when they needed to start and stop playing by a light system operated by the sound engineer that hung in the live room.

"Today it’s like everything is so lit up, everyone’s an automatic star. Back then you’d barely see a picture of these artists—we have it good now, it’s amazing now compared to then—but still, they had something sacred, they had something that we don’t possess. It was just music, people expressing themselves with the sound at that time, and it had nothing to do with the video, it had nothing to do with anything but the song. It shows me there’s so much more to do, there’s so much further I can go, but now I know the beginnings; this gives me the roots of all of it."

— Nas

The pulley allowed approximately three and a half minutes to record before the weight hit the floor. The calibration of the lathe has determined the length of the pop single to this day. The Western Electric recording system favored small vocal led groups and this had a fundamental influence on them being the dominant musical aggregation to this day. The recording system did not allow for any changes to be made to the live recording. The Scully lathe itself predated the switch from acoustic to electric recording. In the acoustic era, the lathe was connected to a large conical horn which the musicians had to gather around and sing and play at the loudest possible volume to create enough air pressure to physically vibrate a diaphragm attached to the cutting head. During the filming, MacMahon persuaded Jack White and his band to make an acoustic recording on the lathe, replacing the microphone with two horns – the first such recording made in 90 years. A rough cut of the film containing this sequence was screened at the BFI London Film Festival but it was subsequently cut from later versions to bring the film's duration to under two hours.

=== Editing ===
The editing style of the film was designed to feel like a dance between the camera and the musicians and was devised between editor, Dan Gitlin, and MacMahon. The use of cutaways were infrequently employed in favor of full takes of the musical performances, to make clear that the performances were live and unaltered. Before each performance, as the cutting head needle was lowered onto the disc, the production audio was replaced with a needle drop of the unadorned mono master disc recording. Tracking shots of the dark corridors of the studios accompanied by the audio of vintage performances recorded on the equipment, were used as a recurring theme in the film to signify trips into the past where original recordings of songs that are about to be recorded in the film are heard. These sequences were constructed to give the viewer an understanding of the music from the 1920s and 30s.

== Reception ==
=== Release ===
The film was previewed as a work in progress at film festivals around the world throughout 2016, including a Special Event at Sundance hosted by Robert Redford, SXSW, International Documentary Film Festival Amsterdam, Denver International Film Festival, Sydney Film Festival, and the London Film Festival. The film was completed in February 2017 and aired on PBS in the US and BBC Four in the UK in May and June 2017. An NTSC DVD and Blu-ray of the series was released in the US in June 2017.

=== Critical reception ===
The film was released to widespread critical acclaim, with many publications praising the direction, performances, the quality of the sound, the cinematography and lighting.

Joe Boyd wrote in The Guardian “for two hours we revel in filmed performances in front of that single microphone, as the camera lovingly follows the sound through anaconda-like cables to the cutting head. As soon as the blank disc starts spinning, our soundtrack switches from the film-maker’s 21st-century handheld digital stereo to the glorious mono of the single microphone. There are no faders; if Burnett or White want more of this musician and a bit less of that one, they move them closer to or away from the microphone. It’s brilliant theatre, beautifully filmed and makes for glorious television. Miss it at your peril.” Stephen Dalton in The Hollywood Reporter wrote that the film was “a mammoth project with worthy intentions and a big heart - a feast of musical and educational riches.” Steve Appleford in Rolling Stone observed that “in the final performance of Sessions, Willie Nelson and Merle Haggard perform the duet "The Only Man Wilder Than Me." Haggard has a look of complete joy on his face throughout the session in the old-timey recording set-up once used by his musical heroes.” Mike Bradley in The Observer said The American Epic Sessions was “one of the most interesting music programmes ever broadcast. Wonderful.” Michael Watts in The Economist wrote the film was “unmissable and uncovers the origins of popular music.” Iain Shedden in The Australian noted “one of the highlights (and audience prizewinner) of last year’s Sydney Film Festival was the American Epic series of documentaries by British filmmaker Bernard MacMahon and producers Allison McGourty and Duke Erikson. The American Epic Sessions, brought together a wealth of contemporary talent. It’s an exquisite representation of the primitive power of American roots music and its enduring charm - music that stirs the soul.” Greil Marcus in The Village Voice praised the film for “performances so good you can hardly listen without thinking of how close each recording is to not existing at all.” Liz Jobey in the Financial Times hailed the film as “an extraordinary journey back through American song recording” and Ludovic Hunter-Tilney in the same paper remarked that “New York Rapper Nas does a superb cover of the Memphis Jug Band's “On the Road Again”, exposing the hip-hop blueprint within the 1928 stomper.”

Danny Eccleston in Mojo pointed out that “in one of the series’ most extraordinary moments, Elton John arrives toting a box-fresh lyric by Bernie Taupin and works it up in an instant, the song materializing in front of the viewers eyes before John and Jack White go for the take. There's the magic right there.” L. Kent Wolgamott in the Lincoln Journal Star praised it as “a fascinating picture. Among its highlights: A killer performance in Spanish by Ana Gabriel on a song originally done by Lydia Mendoza; Taj Mahal’s powerhouse take on Charley Patton’s “High Water Everywhere”; and Bettye LaVette's heartfelt recollections of being pushed away from early blues as “Uncle Tomish” in the ‘60s before she nails “When I Woke Up This Morning.” Stephen Thompson at NPR wrote that “watching Alabama Shakes' members tear into this brief but potent cover of "Killer Diller", you get insights into the magic of the equipment and studio, the timelessness of the song, and Alabama Shakes' own genre-and era-busting charisma.” James Moore in Gigwise observed “This need for greatness within that three-minute take is captured perfectly in the film, moments of silence before a blue light indicates “go” seeping with nail-biting tension and atmosphere. In every case, the results are astounding and the artists always deliver. When you watch, this cinematic choice feels absolutely perfect, the lack of cuts capturing the immediacy of the song and reflecting the fact that the musicians have no choice to cut and start again either. Oh, and the sound...Wonderfully visceral, raw and untampered with, every original recording is layered with character and charisma, the beautifully complex machine always manages to draw the very best from its chosen subject. Handled with wonderful care, romanticism and respect for the technology and the incredible talent it facilitated, the film is a viewing experience like no other and should be sought out by music fans of all tastes and ages.”

Brian McCollum in the Detroit Free Press wrote that the film “brings a lost musical era back to life” and praised “a documentary which pairs a scholarly eye for detail with a buoyant fan passion.” Chris Willman in Variety praised the film for being “all about romance” and posited that “the ultimate star of this show is a meticulously reconstructed recording machine from the 1920s that seems to have talismanic qualities on those who enter its orbit even 80 years after it was last in use. This antiquated, cleaned up piece of studio equipment is so fetishistically photographed, it relegates the 19 musical acts that drop by for an old-school session to supporting players. Fortunately, it’s a stunt that pays off, in pristine contemporary recordings you can scarcely believe went directly through a cutting stylus direct to disc. Bernard MacMahon, who championed this project for the better part of this century, makes the best case for this beautiful monstrosity of a machine representing the pre-homogeneity democratization of American music.” Robert Lloyd in the Los Angeles Times confided "I don’t mind telling you I got a little emotional watching this, and you might too." Kurt Gardner in Blogcritics called the film “An amazing journey through musical history. Lovers of music and early Americana alike will be fascinated by Bernard MacMahon and Allison McGourty’s The American Epic Sessions. The enormous device, made of pulleys, flywheels, weights, and wood, was set up in a Los Angeles recording studio whose nondescript exterior gave no hint of the magic taking place inside. There, the film is lit in nostalgic, burnished hues, and loving close-ups of the marvelous contraption in operation are interspersed with performances by such talents as The Avett Brothers, Los Lobos, Alabama Shakes, Taj Mahal, Willie Nelson, Merle Haggard, and Elton John. Historically fascinating and musically entertaining, The American Epic Sessions was the perfect film to watch during SXSW at Austin’s historic Paramount Theatre, surrounded as we were by the ghosts of entertainers who’d graced the stage over its 100-year history.” James Jackson in The Times wrote “none of these machines survive, but for this high-class film the engineering has been lovingly reassembled for today’s stars to try. It’s all very muso, but completely enriching too – watching Elton John compose a song with Jack White is a thrill.” Euan Ferguson, in The Observer summarized “I have to say all acquitted themselves phenomenally. Everyone who has ever been even the tiniest bit interested in music should watch this.”

The film has received a number of awards, including the Foxtel Audience Award at the 2016 Sydney Film Festival,. At the 2016 Calgary International Film Festival, it won the Audience Award and garnered director Bernard MacMahon the Discovery Award. The film was also nominated for a Primetime Emmy 2017 for Outstanding Musical Direction, Bernard MacMahon and Allison McGourty were nominated by the British Academy Film Awards in 2018 as Breakthrough Talents for The American Epic Sessions and the film won a Grammy Award for Alabama Shakes performance of “Killer Diller Blues".

=== Awards and nominations ===
Award	Category	Recipients and nominees	Result	Ref.
Calgary International Film Festival	The Discovery Award	Bernard MacMahon	Won	
Calgary International Film Festival	Audience Award	The American Epic Sessions	Won	
Primetime Emmy Award	Outstanding Music Direction	Bernard MacMahon, Duke Erikson, T Bone Burnett and Jack White	Nominated	
Sydney Film Festival	Foxtel Audience Award	American Epic	Won	
Tryon International Film Festival	Best Documentary	Bernard MacMahon	Won	
Tryon International Film Festival	Best Overall Picture	Bernard MacMahon	Won	
Hollywood Music in Media Awards	Best Original Song - Documentary	“Two Fingers of Whiskey” - Bernie Taupin, Elton John, T Bone Burnett and Jack White	Nominated	
Grammy Award	Best American Roots Performance	"Killer Diller Blues" - Alabama Shakes	Won	
British Academy Film Awards	Breakthrough Talent	Bernard MacMahon (director) & Allison McGourty (producer, writer, music supervisor)	Nominated	

== Album ==
The original motion picture soundtrack was a three-LP and two-CD album released on June 9, 2017. It contained many performances not featured in the film, including "One Mic" by Nas, " “Mama's Angel Child" by Jack White, "Come on In My Kitchen" by Stephen Stills, and "Josephine" by Pokey Lafarge.

== Performances ==
Song	Artist(s)	Session	US Film	UK Film	Album
“If The River Was Whiskey”	Frank Fairfield	1	2	2	22
“The Lost Child”	The Americans	2	-	-	-
“Sail Away Ladies”	The Americans	2	-	-	25
“Train On the Island”	The Americans	2	-	-	-
“Fishin Blues”	Taj Mahal	3	-	-	-
“What Kinda Man”	Taj Mahal	3	-	-	-
“Hold the Woodpile Down”	Taj Mahal	3	-	-	-
“Hilo Hanakahi”	The Hawaiians	4	-	14	31
“Tomi Tomi”	The Hawaiians	4	14	15	26
“Last Kind Words”	Christine Pizzuti	5	-	-	27
“St. Louis Blues”	Pokey Lafarge	6	10	11	15
“Josephine”	Pokey Lafarge	6	-	-	30
“Nobody's Dirty Business”	Bettye LaVette	7	16	18	14
“When I Woke Up this Morning”	Bettye LaVette	7	-	-	21
“Killer Diller Blues”	Alabama Shakes	8	5	5	1
“I Ain’t the Same”	Alabama Shakes	8	-	-	-
“Mal Hombre”	Ana Gabriel	9	18	20	10
“Two Fingers of Whiskey”	Elton John	10	7	7	4
“Jordan Am A Hard Road”	Avett Brothers	11	credits	credits	24
“Closer Walk With Thee”	Avett Brothers	11	17	19	12
“Matrimonial Intentions”	Jack White	12	1	1	8
“Mama's Angel Child”	Jack White	12	-	-	29
“I Guess I Should Go To Sleep”	Jack White	12	-	-	-
“Jubilee”	Ashley Monroe & The Americans	13	8	8	19
“Like A Rose”	Ashley Monroe	13	-	9	6
“On the Road Again”	Nas	14	4	4	2
“One Mic”	Nas	14	-	23	17
“El Cascabel”	Los Lobos	15	6	6	11
“14 Rivers, 14 Floods”	Beck	16	19	21	13
“One Hour Mama”	Rhiannon Giddens	17	20	22	9
“Pretty Saro”	Rhiannon Giddens	17	-	-	18
“The Preacher and the Bear”	Nas & Jack White	18	-	-	-
“Candy Man”	Jerron Paxton	19	13	14	3
“The Only Man Wilder than Me”	Willie Nelson & Merle Haggard	20	24	26	7
“Old-Fashioned Love”	Willie Nelson & Merle Haggard	20	25	27	32
“Old Joe”	Jerron Paxton	21	-	-	-
“Stacker Lee”	Jerron Paxton	21	-	-	-
“I Lost My Appetite for Chicken”	Jerron Paxton	21	-	-	-
“There Aint No More Blues”	Jerron Paxton	21	-	-	-
“Come On In My Kitchen”	Stephen Stills	22	-	-	28
“Mama's Angel Child” – acoustic recording	Jack White with band	23	-	-	-
“Mama's Angel Child” – acoustic recording	Jack White duet	23	-	-	-
“The Coo Coo Bird”	Steve Martin & Edie Brickell	24	12	13	5
“Love Has Come for You”	Steve Martin & Edie Brickell	24	-	-	-
“Stealin Stealin”	Raphael Saadiq	25	23	25	23
“High Water Everywhere”	Taj Mahal	26	9	10	16
“Allons à Lafayette”	Lost Bayou Ramblers	27	22	24	-
“Tous Les Matins”	Lost Bayou Ramblers	27	-	-	20

== Performers ==
=== Groups ===
==== Alabama Shakes ====
- Zac Cockrell - Bass
- Heath Fogg - Guitar
- Brittany Howard - Vocals, Guitar
- Steve Johnson - Drums
- Ben Tanner - Piano

==== The Americans ====
- Tim Carr - Steel Guitar
- Jake Faulkner - Upright Bass
- Patrick Ferris - Guitar
- Zac Sokolow - Mandolin

==== The Avett Brothers ====
- Scott Avett - Vocals, Banjo
- Seth Avett - Vocals, Acoustic guitar
- Bob Crawford - Upright Bass
- Joe Kwon - Cello

==== Beck ====
- Beck Hansen - Vocals And Guitar
- Roger Manning - Piano
- Emanuel Bennet - Vocals
- Jennifer M. Brown - Vocals
- Claire Hafteck - Vocals
- Shana May Jackson - Vocals
- Michelle Jones - Vocals
- Fred Martin - Musical Director
- Dwanna Orange - Vocals
- Tai Phillips - Vocals
- Kevin Shannon - Vocals
- Ari Sorko-Ram - Vocals
- Fawn Sorko-Ram - Vocals
- Marc Sorko-Ram - Vocals

==== Frank Fairfield ====
- Frank Fairfield - Vocals, Slide Guitar

==== Ana Gabriel ====
- Jay Bellerose - Drums
- Ana Gabriel - Vocals
- Van Dyke Parks - Accordion
- Omar Rodríguez-López - Guitar
- Gabe Witcher - Fiddle

==== Rhiannon Giddens ====
- Rhiannon Giddens - Vocals
- Hubby Jenkins - Banjo

==== The Hawaiians ====
- Dom Flemons - Guitar, Backup Vocals, Bones
- Bobby Ingano - Lap Steel
- Auntie Geri Kuhia - Vocals
- Charlie Kaleo Oyama - Vocals
- Fred Sokolow - Lap Steel

==== Elton John ====
- Elton John - Vocals, Piano

==== Pokey Lafarge ====
- Chloe Feoranzo - Clarinet
- Joseph Glynn - Upright Bass
- Adam Hoskins - Guitar
- Ryan Koenig - Percussion
- Pokey LaFarge - Vocals, Guitar
- Matthew Meyer - Drums
- TJ Muller - Cornet
- Dom Flemons - Bones

==== Bettye LaVette ====
- Bettye LaVette - Vocals

==== Los Lobos ====
- David Hidalgo - Vocals, Requinto Jarocho
- Conrad Lozano - Vocals, Guitarron
- Louie Pérez - Vocals, Jarana
- Cesar Rosas - Vocals, Guitar

==== Lost Bayou Ramblers ====
- Robert Carruth - Guitar
- Eric Heigle – Drums
- André Michot - Accordion
- Louis Michot - Vocals, Fiddle

==== Taj Mahal ====
- Taj Mahal - Vocals, Ukelele

==== Steve Martin & Edie Brickell ====
- Edie Brickell - Vocals
- Steve Martin - Banjo

==== Ashley Monroe ====
- Ashley Monroe - Vocals, guitar

==== Nas ====
- Nas - Vocals

==== Willie Nelson and Merle Haggard ====
- Merle Haggard - Vocals, Guitar
- Willie Nelson - Vocals, Guitar

==== Jerron “Blind Boy” Paxton ====
- Jerron "Blind Boy" Paxton - Vocals, Guitar

==== Raphael Saadiq ====
- Raphael Saadiq - Vocals

==== Jack White ====
- Carla Azar - Percussion
- Dominic Davis - Upright Bass
- Fats Kaplin - Mandolin
- Lillie Mae Rische - Vocals, Fiddle
- Jack White - Vocals, Guitar

=== Other musicians ===
- Daru Jones - Drums
- Alfredo Ortiz - Drums
- Joshua Smith - Guitar
