= Dan Gitlin =

American film editor

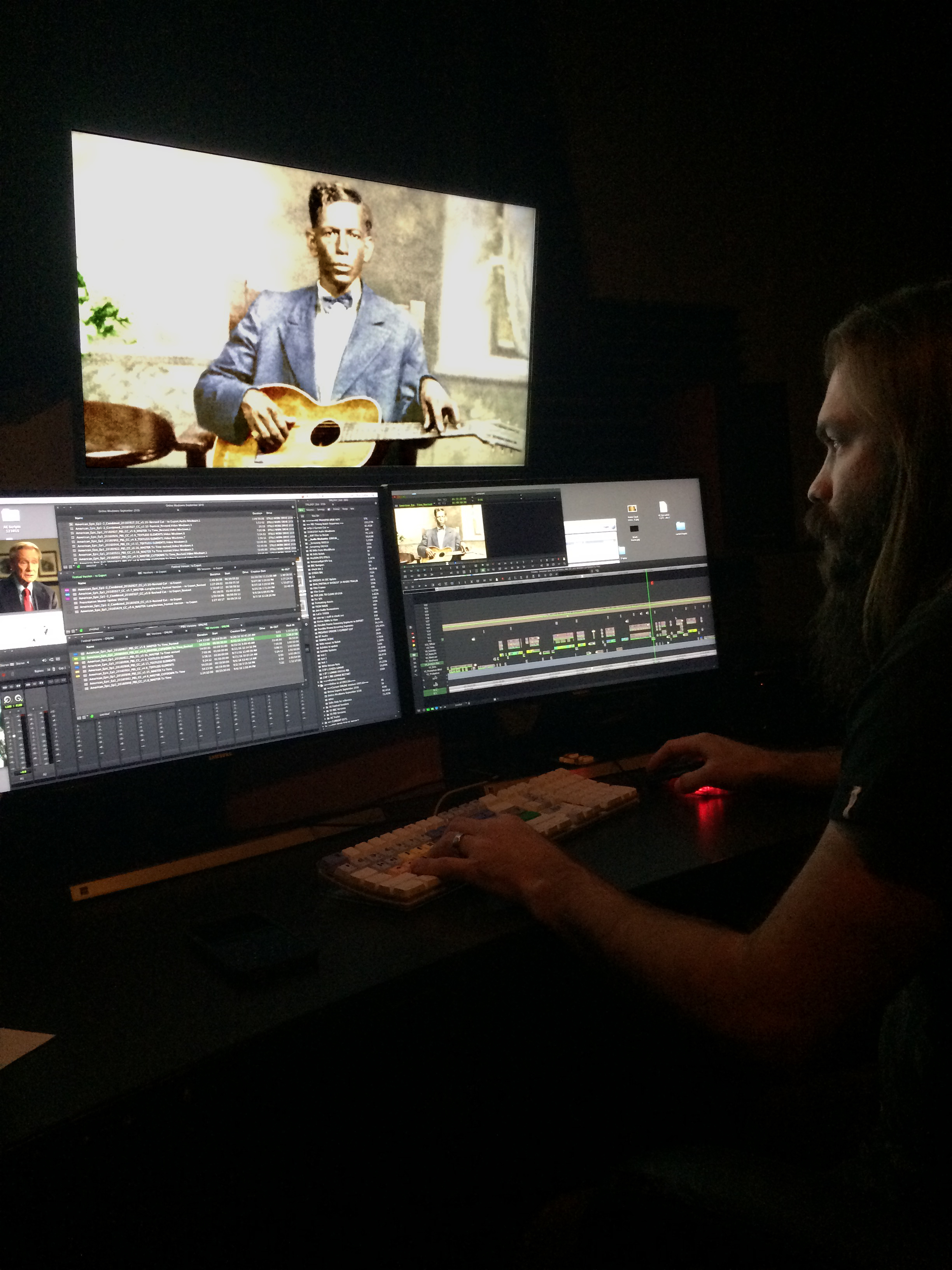
- Gitlin editing American Epic in 2016
- Born: Daniel Scott Gitlin; March 10, 1983 (age 43)
- Occupation: Film editor

Dan Gitlin (born March 10, 1983) is an American film editor based in Los Angeles.

== Early career ==
Prior to his career working with Lo-Max Films and Paradise Pictures, Gitlin was an assistant editor and online editor at the Westside Media Group in Los Angeles.

== Film career ==
Gitlin is the supervising editor of American Epic, a body of work exploring the early history of American recorded music. He is primarily known for his work with film director Bernard MacMahon, with whom he has edited four films to date, and works as an editor with Lo-Max Films and Paradise Pictures.

Gitlin was the supervising editor of the three films that comprise the American Epic trilogy; American Epic: The Big Bang, American Epic: Blood and Soil, and American Epic: Out Of The Many The One. He also edited The American Epic Sessions, a musical film featuring many top contemporary artists, including Alabama Shakes, The Americans, The Avett Brothers, Beck, Frank Fairfield, Ana Gabriel, Rhiannon Giddens, Merle Haggard, Bobby Ingano, Elton John, Pokey LaFarge, Bettye LaVette, Los Lobos, Lost Bayou Ramblers, Taj Mahal, Steve Martin & Edie Brickell, Fred Martin & The Levite Camp, Ashley Monroe, Nas, Willie Nelson, Jerron "Blind Boy" Paxton, Raphael Saadiq and Jack White.

Films he has worked on have been selected for a number of film festivals including: The American Epic Sessions at the BFI London Film Festival 2015, The American Epic Sessions at IDFA 2015, American Epic: The Big Bang at IDFA 2015, American Epic: Out Of The Many The One at the Hawaiian International Film Festival where it was nominated for the Halekulani Golden Orchid Award, American Epic: Out of the Many the One at Sydney Film Festival where it won the Foxtel Audience Award, to great acclaim at the North American Premiere at the SXSW Film Festival 2016 and the Sundance Film Festival on January 28, 2016, where Robert Redford presented the USA premiere of American Epic at The Eccles. The Sundance special event was produced by Allison McGourty, and featured an introduction by Sundance founder Robert Redford, a screening of excerpts from the American Epic films, and a Q&A, hosted by Peter Golub of The Sundance Institute, with MacMahon, Taj Mahal, Jack White and T Bone Burnett. This was followed by performances by Taj Mahal and The Avett Brothers.

== Filmography ==
- The American Epic Sessions (2017)
- American Epic: The Big Bang (2017)
- American Epic: Blood and Soil (2017)
- American Epic: Out Of the Many The One (2017)

== Awards and honors ==
| Award | Category | Recipients and nominees | Result | Ref. |
|---|---|---|---|---|
| Calgary International Film Festival | Audience Award | The American Epic Sessions | Won | |
| Sydney Film Festival | Foxtel Audience Award | American Epic | Won | |
| Primetime Emmy Award | Outstanding Music Direction | The American Epic Sessions | Nominated | |
| Hawaii International Film Festival | Halekulani Golden Orchid Award | American Epic: Out of the Many the One | Nominated | |
| Tryon International Film Festival | Best Documentary | American Epic | Won | |
| Tryon International Film Festival | Best Overall Picture | American Epic | Won | |
| Focal International Awards | Best Use of Footage in a History Feature | American Epic (documentary) | Nominated | |
| Focal International Awards | Best Use of Footage in a Music Production | American Epic (documentary) | Nominated | |
