= Over the Garden Wall (soundtrack) =

Over the Garden Wall (Original Television Soundtrack)

Soundtrack album by various artists
- Released: July 21, 2016
- Recorded: 2014–2015
- Genres: Jazz; folk
- Length: 53:13
- Labels: Turner Music Publishing; Cartoon Network
- Producer: The Blasting Company

Over the Garden Wall (Original Television Soundtrack) is the soundtrack to the 2014 animated television miniseries of the same name for Cartoon Network created by Patrick McHale. Two years after the series' premiere, the music from the series were released into a separate soundtrack album on July 21, 2016 by Turner Music Publishing and Cartoon Network, distributed in a vinyl LP by Mondo at the 2016 San Diego Comic-Con. It featured 32 tracks from the series' with vocal performances and instrumental tunes composed by The Blasting Company.

The band members: Brandon Armstrong, Justin Rubenstein and Joshua Kaufman had performed the instrumentation for the score, and conjunctionally wrote lyrics for the tunes along with McHale. The cast members, Elijah Wood, Collin Dean, Chris Isaak, Shirley Jones, Jack Jones, Jerron "Blind Boy" Paxton, Deborah Voigt, Jenna Ortega, Janet Klein, C.W. Stoneking, and Samuel Ramey, amongst others performed the tracks, which included periodic jazz and folk compositions.

== Background ==
McHale hired The Blasting Company, to score music and songs for the series, and gave all sorts of direction as there are different styles of music. The band felt that, "the sound of the world that he created was completely integral to its creation, from the very beginning. Our role was mostly to serve his vision, as best as we could, and help him realize his world." Even before the animation of the pilot episode, the band had met with McHale numerous times, listening to music and playing different themes to each other. Those meetings set the tone for the project and led them to guide in the right direction. The band used real instruments for the score, deviating from the synth music, and also known to play strings which have "lush string arrangements that they layered and pieced together".

As the mood of the show is an important aspect of the series, McHale felt that "the music sort of paints — with the color scheme and all that stuff — the music finishes it off and makes it the right feeling for the audience's experience of this place where we can delve into, sometimes, genres of music that might not match what we're watching but give you a certain feeling". Various melodies and songs based on pre-1950s music are heard throughout the series. Apart from the Blasting Company performing the tracks, the album had two opera singers performing music, and consisted of old-time jazz and jug band music.

Elijah Wood, who voiced Wirt, has said that "if this show were a record, it would be played on a phonograph". Songs from the series include "Into the Unknown", its title song, composed by Patrick McHale and sung by Jack Jones; "A Courting Song", composed by the Petrojvic Blasting Company and performed by Frank Fairfield; and "Come Wayward Souls", sung by Samuel Ramey as the Beast. The majority of the series' songs have been officially uploaded to YouTube. On the DVD release they can be heard, along with visuals and without dialogue, in a special feature known as the Composer's Cut.

== Release ==
The soundtrack to the series, featuring 32 tracks and totaling around 44 minutes in length, was released in the form of a double-disc 180-gram vinyl record by Mondo in July 2016. The extended soundtrack debuted at San Diego Comic-Con on July 21, 2016, with a limited 1,000 copies, featuring a cover designed by Sam Wolfe Connelly. The extended vinyl is also available as a webstore exclusive from Mondo.

During September 2015, Mondo released an audio cassette tape titled "For Sara", based on the cassette tape labelled with the same name seen in the series. The cassette features over twenty minutes of poetry spoken by Elijah Wood (in character as Wirt) and music performed by the Blasting Company. In September 2017, Mondo released the cassette a second time, with the subtitle "(Back-Up Master)".

On November 3, 2020, The Blasting Company released six unreleased tracks, that had been excluded from the series. Those included: "When Me and My Brother Had a Row", "Accordion Lullaby", "The Tithing Man", "Sketch of the Unknown", "The Blacksmith's Song" and "Wirt's Clarinets".

== Reception ==
Matty from Sputnikmusic gave a 5/5 to the album, calling it as "the perfect score for raking leaves, carving pumpkins and brisk night walks. Hope everyone enjoys and has a lovely autumn season". Jenna Anne of Marvelous Geeks Media wrote "From fun lyrical tunes that each reference different time periods to epic score, this album is an all encompassing fall mood while highlighting the quirky-spooky-fun ride that is Over the Garden Wall." Norene Bassin of Impact 89FM commented "Over the Garden Wall is punctuated by some of the most beautiful music to ever grace an animated series." Brian Moylan of The Guardian felt that "the original songs that seem like they could be played by one of the buskers from Once". Emma Stefansky of Thrillist opined that musical numbers are "best described as Appalachian folk songs by way of Tom Waits."

Writing for Afterglow, Caroline Harrison said "Incorporating American Gothicism and historical musical styles, "Over the Garden Wall" creates a diverse, yet cohesive sound of fall—its worries and comforts. Primarily utilizing American folk and jazz traditions, the soundtrack's historical sound integrates nostalgia into every track, whether it is meant to be scary or sweet."

== Track listing ==
All music is composed by The Blasting Company, except where indicated.

Over the Garden Wall (Original Television Soundtrack)
No.	Title	Lyrics	Music	Artist(s)	Length
1.	"Prelude"				1:31
2.	"Into the Unknown"	Brandon Armstrong, Joshua Kaufman, Justin Rubenstein, Patrick McHale	McHale	Jack Jones	1:27
3.	"You Have Beautiful Eyes"				1:31
4.	"Pottsfield C.M."				1:30
5.	"Patient Is the Night"	Armstrong, Kaufman, Rubenstein, McHale		Chris Isaak	1:27
6.	"Adelaide Parade"			Collin Dean, Elijah Wood	1:37
7.	"Money for School"				1:15
8.	"Ms. Langtree's Lament"			Janet Klein	2:27
9.	"Potatoes & Molasses"	David V. Stevenson		Dean	1:11
10.	"Off to Bed"				1:05
11.	"The Beast Is Out There"	Armstrong, Kaufman, Rubenstein, McHale		Audrey Wasilewski	0:45
12.	"The Highwayman"	Jerron "Blind Boy" Paxton, Pendleton Ward		Paxton	0:31
13.	"A Courting Song"	Armstrong, Kaufman, Rubenstein, McHale	Petrojvic Blasting Company	Frank Fairfield	1:20
14.	"Endicott Manor"				1:02
15.	"The Journey Begins"				0:50
16.	"Half-Moon River"				0:57
17.	"McLaughlin Bros. Jug Band"				0:40
18.	"Over the Garden Wall"	Armstrong, Kaufman, Rubenstein, McHale		Jack Jones	1:45
19.	"Send Me a Peach"				2:02
20.	"Adelaide's Trap"				2:11
21.	"Like Ships"			Wood, Shannyn Sossamon	0:29
22.	"More Bones to Sort"				0:50
23.	"Old North Wind"	Mark Bodnar		Bodnar	1:03
24.	"Forward, Oneiroi"	Armstrong, Kaufman, Rubenstein, McHale		Deborah Voigt	1:31
25.	"The Fight Is Over"	Armstrong, Kaufman, Rubenstein, McHale		McHale	1:17
26.	"Tiny Star"			Eddika Organista	1:42
27.	"Old Black Train"				2:13
28.	"The Old Mill"				1:24
29.	"Come Wayward Souls"	Armstrong, Kaufman, Rubenstein, McHale		Audio Clayton, Samuel Ramey	1:51
30.	"Potatus et Molassus"	Armstrong, Kaufman, Rubenstein, McHale		Clayton	2:18
31.	"One Is a Bird"			Shirley Jones	1:40
32.	"Black Train / End Credits"				0:37
Total length:					43:59

Digital bonus tracks
No.	Title	Lyrics	Music	Artist(s)	Length
33.	"The Clouded Annals of History"				0:34
34.	"Can't You See I'm Lonely"	Felix F. Feist	Harry Armstrong	C.W. Stoneking	1:19
35.	"Shine On"	Jack Norworth	Nora Bayes	C.W. Stoneking	2:18
36.	"Everything Is Nice and Fine"			Judah Nelson	1:21
37.	"Halloween Halftime"				2:17
38.	"Two Old Cat"				0:56
39.	"The Jolly Woodsman"	Engelbert Humperdinck		Samuel Ramey	0:48
40.	"Tome of the Unknown"				0:16
Total length:					53:48

== Personnel ==
- Sam Wolfe Connelly – artwork
- Mo Shafeek – art direction
- Justin Rubenstein – backing vocals, cello, trombone, violin, alto vocals, snare drum, guitar, trumpet, auxiliary percussion, baritone horn
- Brandon Armstrong – backing vocals, double bass, bass vocals, violin, guitar, whistle, cymbal, trombone, tuba, snare drum, mandolin, ukulele, auxiliary percussion, baritone horn
- Joshua Kaufman – backing vocals, piano, organ, clarinet, whistle, accordion, tenor vocals, snare drum, bass drum, auxiliary percussion, synthesiser, musical box
- Leah Harmon – backing vocals, soprano vocals
- Eddika Organista – backing vocals
- Audio Clayton – backing vocals
- Samuel Ramey – bass vocals
- Kat Nockels Beers – bassoon
- Patricia Gunther – contrabassoon
- Harlan Silverman – drum programming
- James Plotkin – engineer
- Dominique Rodriguez – marching drum
- Tom Rogers – mastering (Atomix Studios)
- Oz Fritz – mixing (High Velocity)
- The Blasting Company – recording, production
- Calder Dudgeon – saw
- Cory Beers – snare drum, davul
- Deborah Voigt – soprano vocals
- Austin Hoke – strings
- Charles De Castro – trumpet
- Miamon Miller – violin

== Charts ==
Chart performance for Over the Garden Wall
Chart (2026)	Peak position
Belgian Albums (Ultratop Flanders)	169
Scottish Albums (Official Charts)	30
UK Albums Sales (Official Charts)	34
UK Independent Albums (Official Charts)	16
UK Soundtrack Albums (Official Charts)	1
