= Blind Boy =

Blind Boy or Blindboy may refer to:

- Blind Boy Fuller (died 1941), American blues musician
- Jerron "Blind Boy" Paxton (born 1989), American musician (blues, jazz and other genres)
- Blindboy Boatclub, of Irish comedy-hip hop duo the Rubberbandits
