= Gitlin =

Gitlin is a surname. Notable people with the surname include:

- Dan Gitlin (born 1983), American film editor
- Drew Gitlin (born 1958), American tennis player
- Michael Gitlin (born 1943), South African sculptor
- Richard D. Gitlin (born 1943), American electrical engineer, inventor, executive and entrepreneur
- Todd Gitlin (1943–2022), American sociologist, political writer, novelist and cultural commentator
