= Ramin Karimloo =

Iranian-Canadian actor, singer, songwriter (born 1978)

- رامین کریملو
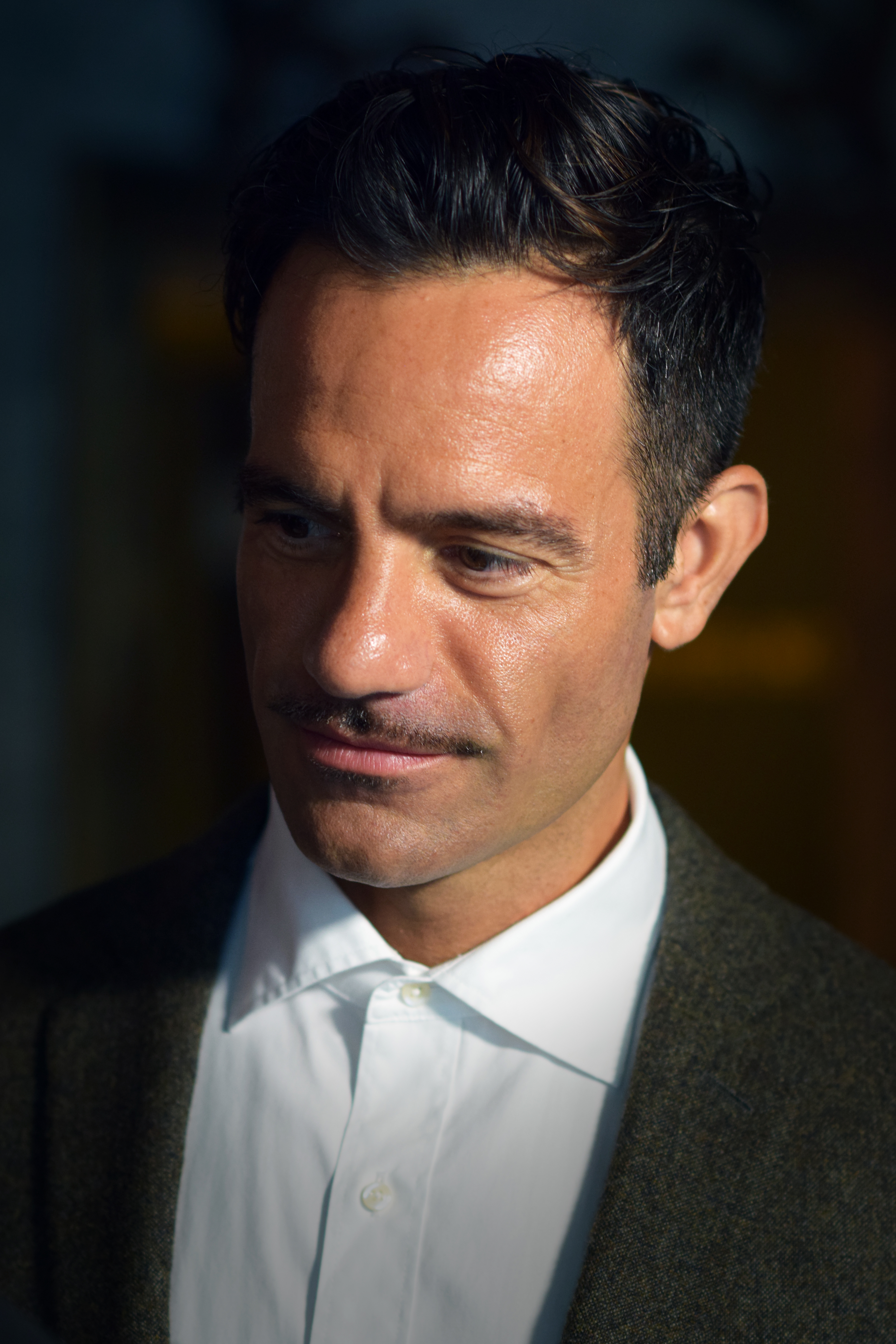
- Karimloo in 2022
- Born: September 19, 1978 (age 48); Tehran, Imperial State of Iran
- Occupations: Actor; singer; songwriter
- Years active: 2001–present
- Known for: The Phantom of the Opera; Les Misérables; Love Never Dies; Anastasia
- Spouse: Amanda Ramsden
- Children: 2
- Website: raminkarimloo.com

Ramin Karimloo (/rəˈmiːn ˈkærɪmluː/; Persian: رامین کریملو; born September 19, 1978) is a Canadian-English actor, singer, and songwriter known for his work on the West End and Broadway theatre.

He has played the leading roles in both of the West End's longest running musicals: The Phantom and Raoul de Chagny in The Phantom of the Opera, and Jean Valjean, Enjolras, and Marius Pontmercy in Les Misérables. He also originated the roles of Gleb Vaganov in Anastasia, a stage adaptation of the 1997 film, Nick Arnstein in the Broadway revival of Funny Girl, and The Phantom in Andrew Lloyd Webber's Love Never Dies, which continues the story of Phantom. He is also known for his many portrayals of Anatoly Sergievsky in the musical Chess. He first played the role at the Kennedy Center in 2018, followed by a 2020 Japan tour and a Broadway concert in 2022. He returned to Broadway in 2025 as the Pirate King in the Roundabout Theatre Company revival of The Pirates of Penzance titled Pirates! The Penzance Musical.

He is also known to many Phantom fans for playing the role of the Phantom during The Phantom of the Opera 25th Anniversary Performance at the Royal Albert Hall, which was shown live in movie theaters around the world in October 2011, appearing opposite Sierra Boggess and Hadley Fraser as Christine Daaé and Raoul de Chagny, respectively. He also appeared in Les Misérables in Concert: The 25th Anniversary reprising the role of Enjolras in October 2010. In early 2011 it was streamed on PBS and released on DVD and Blu-ray.

He made his Broadway debut as Jean Valjean in the 2014 Broadway revival of Les Misérables, for which he was nominated for a Tony Award for Best Actor in a Musical. He can also be heard as Stavros in As The Curtain Rises, Broadway's first original podcast soap opera.

== Career ==
=== 2001–2005: Early career and West End debut in Les Misérables ===
After moving to the United Kingdom, Karimloo's first role was in a pantomime of Aladdin in Chatham, in which he played the title role. He joined the UK national tour of The Pirates of Penzance playing the role of a police officer, as well as understudying the Pirate King in 2001.

In 2002 he took the role of the Pirate King in Bath, England. During this year Karimloo joined the national tour of Sunset Boulevard, playing Artie Green and covering the role of Joe Gillis.

Karimloo made his West End debut in Les Miserables where he played Feuilly and understudied the roles of Marius Pontmercy and Enjolras. He later returned to production in 2004 as the full-time Enjolras.

In 2003, Karimloo took on the role of Raoul, Vicomte de Chagny and three years later was the standby for the Phantom in The Phantom of the Opera. His final matinee performance as Raoul was filmed for use on a behind-the-scenes feature on the DVD of Joel Schumacher's film adaptation of the musical, in which he also appeared in a cameo role as Gustave Daaé.

Karimloo appeared in two concerts: one of Les Misérables, as Marius Pontmercy, and one of Jesus Christ Superstar, as Simon Zealotes, and a featured singer in "Superstar". In 2004, he returned to Les Misérables to the role of Enjolras. That December, he appeared in a concert of Les Misérables at Windsor Castle in honor of the French president Jacques Chirac.

In June 2005, Karimloo joined the UK national tour of Miss Saigon, playing the role of Christopher Scott.

=== 2006–2010: The Phantom of the Opera and Love Never Dies ===
Karimloo started appearing in the West End production of The Phantom of the Opera as the Phantom in September 2007. The role earned him a Theatregoers' Choice Award nomination for Best Actor in a Take Over Role, he played the role from September 2007 to November 2009.

Karimloo released an EP, Within the Six Square Inch, on which he duets with Hadley Fraser and Sophia Ragavelas, both of whom he had already appeared in Les Misérables, as Marius Pontmercy and Éponine Thenardier.

In July 2008, Karimloo participated in the Sydmonton Festival and was the first actor to play the Phantom in the workshop presentation of Love Never Dies. It was the first act of the sequel of The Phantom of the Opera. He played the role alongside Sierra Boggess when the sequel opened in London in March 2010.

In 2008, Karimloo recorded the song "I Only Wish for You" with Shona Lindsay and Dianne Pilkington for the album Songs from the Musicals of Alexander S. Bermange, an album of 20 new recordings by 26 West End stars, released in November 2008 on Dress Circle Records.

In 2009, Karimloo participated in the recording of a new musical album called Bluebird, by Gareth Peter Dicks. Bluebird is a dramatic World War II musical, in which he played American serviceman Ben Breagan. The 24-track album was released in four countries in September 2009. Karimloo's last regular performance in The Phantom of the Opera was on November 7, 2009.

In 2010, he moved on to playing the Phantom in Andrew Lloyd Webber's sequel to The Phantom of the Opera, Love Never Dies, alongside Sierra Boggess, performing the role until the show closed on August 27, 2011.

On October 3, 2010, Karimloo played the role of Enjolras in the 25th anniversary concert of Les Misérables at The O2 Arena in London.

=== 2011–2013: The Phantom of the Opera at the Royal Albert Hall and return to Les Misérables ===
In 2011, he sang Andrew Lloyd Webber's "The Music of the Night" from The Phantom of the Opera at the Miss World Competition, which took place in London.

On October 1 and 2, 2011, he and Boggess reunited as the Phantom and Christine Daaé and played opposite Hadley Fraser as Raoul for the 25th-anniversary production of The Phantom of the Opera at the Royal Albert Hall, which was streamed live to cinemas worldwide.

From November 29, 2011, to March 31, 2012, Karimloo returned to Les Misérables to play the lead role of Jean Valjean opposite Fraser as Javert at The Queen's Theatre, London, for which he won the 2013 Theatregoers' Choice Award for Best Takeover in a Role.

In 2011, Karimloo made a guest appearance in Warwick Davis's BBC2 comedy Life's Too Short as a Scientologist. He has also had a recurring role in The Spa (TV series) on Sky in the United Kingdom.

As part of the 25th anniversary of The Phantom of the Opera, Karimloo performed the title song at The Royal Variety Performance – held in The Lowry, Manchester. Performing alongside Pussycat Dolls' lead singer Nicole Scherzinger, he was joined by three other former Phantoms (Simon Bowman, Earl Carpenter and John Owen-Jones). The performance was aired on ITV1 on December 14, 2011.

Karimloo can also be found on The Music Box album as a hidden track. The song is from the musical Bluebird by Gareth Peter Dicks and is a short acoustic version of a track from the album of the same name. His solo album, Ramin, was released by Sony Music Entertainment on April 9, 2012, in the UK. The album was released in Canada and the US in August 2012.

On January 26, 2013, Karimloo joined John Owen-Jones, Peter Joback, and Hugh Panaro to sing the title song from The Phantom of the Opera with Sierra Boggess and "The Music of the Night" for the encore of Phantom's 25th anniversary on Broadway.

He also played a small role in the action film Vendetta.

Karimloo then played Jean Valjean in the Canadian production of the newly staged Les Misérables, which opened in September 2013.

=== 2014–2020: Broadway debut, Anastasia, and career outside the United Kingdom ===
He returned to the role of Valjean in the 2014 Broadway revival of Les Misérables, making his Broadway debut, and was nominated for the Tony Award for Best Actor in a Musical. He concluded his run on August 30, 2015, and was replaced by Alfie Boe, who portrayed Valjean in the 25th Anniversary concert.

On 16 February 2015, he played Tom Watson in Parade at Lincoln Center opposite Jeremy Jordan, Joshua Henry, Laura Benanti, and Davis Gaines.

On May 29, 2015, it was announced that Karimloo would be leading the musical Prince of Broadway which features songs from all of Harold Prince's famous musicals in Japan. Rehearsals began in September in New York.

On September 25, 2015, he played the role of Barry Hamidi in the sixth-season premiere episode of the CBS police procedural drama Blue Bloods.

In February 2016, Karimloo reunited with Boggess for the Manhattan Concert Productions' staging of The Secret Garden. Also starring opposite Cheyenne Jackson and Sydney Lucas.

In April of the same year, he played Ché in the Vancouver Opera's production of Evita, with John Cudia as Juan Peron. His run lasted until May 8, 2016.

From September 30 until December 3, he starred as Tom in Murder Ballad at the Arts Theatre in London.

On September 22, 2016, it was announced that Karimloo would return to Broadway in the stage musical adaptation of the film Anastasia as General Gleb Vaganov. The show began previews on March 23, 2017 and opened April 24, 2017 at Broadway's Broadhurst Theatre. His final performance in Anastasia was on December 3, 2017.

Karimloo took part in the Kennedy Center performance of Chess as Anatoly, which took place February 14 through the 18th, 2018. He starred opposite Raul Esparza, Karen Olivo, and Ruthie Ann Miles.

He was in the Broadway Classics in Concert at Carnegie Hall alongside Sierra Boggess, Laura Osnes, Norm Lewis, Lea Salonga, Ryan Silverman, Tony Yazbeck, Michael Arden, Carolee Carmello, Allan Corduner, Nikki Renée Daniels and Quentin Earl Darrington.

Karimloo took part in the Toronto Symphony on April 10, 11 and 12, 2018 at Roy Thomson Hall alongside Stephanie J. Block.

He reprised the role of the Phantom in May 2018 in a series of The Phantom of the Opera concerts held at the Sejong Center for the Performing Arts in Seoul, Korea alongside Anna O'Byrne as Christine, as part of the celebration for Andrew Lloyd Webber's 70th birthday. He also performed in Gold Coast, Australia June 16, 2018, Melbourne, Australia June 20, 2018, and in Sydney, Australia on June 23, 2018, again alongside O'Byrne, followed by a special run of Evita in Tokyo, Japan from July 4 to the 29, 2018 at Theatre Orb, where he reprised the role of Che.

On September 13, 2019, the BBC cast him as consultant cardiothoracic surgeon Kian Madani, the rival of Jac Naylor in Holby City. He stayed with the show until 2021.

On September 1, 2019, he played the lead role Yurii Zhivago in the concert production of musical Doctor Zhivago, with his costar Celinde Schoenmaker as Lara. The show was the UK premiere of Doctor Zhivago and only performed twice at Cadogan Hall.

In January 2020, he reprised his role of Anatoly opposite Samantha Barks as Florence in a Japan tour of Chess.

=== 2021–present: Continued success on Broadway, concerts, and return to The Phantom of the Opera ===
In summer 2021, he starred as Joe Gillis in an Off-West End concert of Sunset Boulevard. In December of that same year he reprised the role at the Royal Albert Hall.

On October 6, 2021, it was announced that Karimloo would be returning to Broadway as Nick Arnstein in the Broadway revival of Funny Girl, alongside Jane Lynch, Jared Grimes, and Beanie Feldstein and was directed by Micheal Mayer. It started previews on March 26, 2022, and officially opened on April 24, 2022, at the August Wilson Theatre. He stayed with the show through its closing in September 2023 where he starred opposite Lea Michele as Fanny Brice.

In October 2022, Karimloo played the Pirate King in a Broadway concert of The Pirates of Penzance at the American Airlines Theatre. In December 2022, he reprised his role of Anatoly Sergievsky in a Broadway benefit concert of Chess opposite Darren Criss, Lena Hall, and Solea Pfeiffer at the Broadhurst Theatre.

He reprised his role of Yurii Zhivago in a concert production of the musical Doctor Zhivago, opposite Celinde Schoenmaker as Lara at the London Palladium on May 7, 2023.

On February 27, 2023, it was announced that Karimloo would reprise his role of the Phantom in the Italy premiere of The Phantom of the Opera. He starred opposite Bradley Jaden as Raoul, Earl Carpenter as Monsieur André, and Amelia Milo as Christine. Performances began on July 4, 2023 at the Politeama Rossetti in Trieste, Italy. This same production toured to Milan in October 2023 and Monaco in December 2023. He’s set to reprise the role from September to December 2026 at the Shanghai Grand Theatre as a part of the international touring production.

On October 31, 2023, it was announced Karimloo would play Gomez Addams in the musical The Addams Family live in concert at the London Palladium in February 2024. This would be the West End premiere of the show.

In March 2024, Karimloo made his operatic debut in Songbird, playing the title role at the Kennedy Center as part of the Washington National Opera. In June 2024, he made his Encores! debut in Titanic as Frederick Barrett at New York City Center.

On 4 June 2024, it was announced that Dirty Rotten Scoundrels would return to the West End for a concert run at the London Palladium on 24 November 2024, marking 20 years since the show premiered. Karimloo starred as Freddy Benson opposite Hadley Fraser as Lawrence Jamieson.

In July 2024, he performed both Broadway and folk songs at Broadway by the Boardwalk, a free summer concert series by the Hudson River. In 2025, he appeared opposite Rachel Zegler in her solo concert, Rachel Zegler: Live at the London Palladium.

In April 2025, returned to Broadway as the Pirate King in Pirates! The Penzance Musical, a re-imagining of The Pirates of Penzance, at the Todd Haimes Theatre.

In July and August 2026, he starred as the title role in a revival of Sweeney Todd: The Demon Barber of Fleet Street at the Birmingham Repertory Theatre, opposite Meow Meow as Mrs Lovett and David Bedella as Judge Turpin.

== Personal life ==
Karimloo and his wife Amanda Ramsden have two sons. While promoting The Last Match: A Pro-Wrestling Rock Musical, he wrestled co-star Matt Cardona at Outlaw Wrestling in Queens, New York.

== Theatre credits ==
Year(s)	Production	Role	Theatre	Notes
2001	The Pirates of Penzance	Police Officer u/s The Pirate King	—N/a	U.K. National Tour
2002	The Pirates of Penzance	The Pirate King	—N/a	U.K. National Tour
2002	Sunset Boulevard	Artie Green u/s Joe Gillis	—N/a	U.K. National Tour
2002–2003	Les Misérables	Feuilly u/s Marius Pontmercy u/s Enjolras	Palace Theatre	West End
2003–2004	The Phantom of the Opera	Raoul, Vicomte de Chagny	Her Majesty's Theatre	West End
2004	Les Misérables	Marius Pontmercy	Powderham Castle	Concert
2004	Jesus Christ Superstar	Simon Zealotes	Ferneham Hall	Concert
2004–2005	Les Misérables	Enjolras	Queen's Theatre	West End
2004	Les Misérables	Enjolras	Windsor Castle	Performed for HM the Queen & the Royal Family
2005–2006	Miss Saigon	Chris Scott	—N/a	U.K. National Tour
2006–2007	The Phantom of the Opera	s/b The Phantom of the Opera	Her Majesty's Theatre	West End
2007–2009	The Phantom of the Opera	The Phantom of the Opera	Her Majesty's Theatre	West End
2008	Phantom: Once Upon Another Time	The Phantom of the Opera	Sydmonton Festival	Ecchinswell
2010–2011	Love Never Dies	The Phantom of the Opera	Adelphi Theatre	West End
2010	Les Misérables	Enjolras	The O2 Arena	25th Anniversary Concert
2011	The Phantom of the Opera	The Phantom of the Opera	Royal Albert Hall	25th Anniversary Performance
2011–2012	Les Misérables	Jean Valjean	Queen's Theatre	West End
2013–2014	Les Misérables	Jean Valjean	Princess of Wales Theatre	Toronto
2014–2015	Les Misérables	Jean Valjean	Imperial Theatre	Broadway
2015	Parade	Tom Watson	David Geffen Hall	Lincoln Center
2015	Anastasia	Gleb Vaganov	Unknown	New York Workshop
2015	Prince of Broadway	Various	Umeda Arts Theater	Osaka, Japan
2015	Prince of Broadway	Various	Tokyu Theatre Orb	Tokyo, Japan
2016	The Secret Garden	Lord Archibald Craven	Lincoln Center	25th Anniversary Concert
2016	Evita	Che	Vancouver Opera House	Vancouver, Canada
2016	Murder Ballad	Tom	Arts Theatre	West End
2017	Anastasia	Gleb Vaganov	Broadhurst Theatre	Broadway
2018	Chess	Anatoly Sergievsky	Kennedy Center	Washington D.C.
2018	The Phantom of the Opera	The Phantom of the Opera	Sejong Center	Seoul, Korea
2018	Evita	Che	Tokyo Theatre Orb	Tokyo, Japan
2018	Les Misérables	Jean Valjean	Beau Sejour	Guernsey
2019	Doctor Zhivago	Dr. Yurii Zhivago	Cadogan Hall	London
2019	Jesus Christ Superstar	Judas Iscariot	Tokyu Theatre Orb	Tokyo, Japan
2020	Chess	Anatoly Sergievsky	Umeda Arts Theater	Osaka, Japan
2020	Chess	Anatoly Sergievsky	Tokyo International Forum	Tokyo, Japan
2021	Sunset Boulevard	Joe Gillis	Alexandra Palace	Off-West End
2021	Jesus Christ Superstar	Judas Iscariot	Tokyu Theatre Orb	Tokyo, Japan
2021	Rumi: The Musical	Shams	London Coliseum	West End
2021	Sunset Boulevard	Joe Gillis	Royal Albert Hall	London
2022	Camelot	King Arthur	London Palladium	West End
2022–2023	Funny Girl	Nick Arnstein	August Wilson Theatre	Broadway
2022	The Last Match: A Pro-Wrestling Rock Musical	Ben Vengeance	White Eagle Hall	Jersey City, NJ
2022	The Pirates of Penzance	The Pirate King	American Airlines Theatre	Broadway
2022	Chess	Anatoly Sergievsky	Broadhurst Theatre	Broadway
2023	Doctor Zhivago	Dr. Yurii Zhivago	London Palladium	West End
2023	The Phantom of the Opera	The Phantom of the Opera	Politeama Rossetti	Trieste, Italy
2023	The Phantom of the Opera	The Phantom of the Opera	Tam Teatro Arcimboldi Milano	Milan, Italy
2023	The Phantom of the Opera	The Phantom of the Opera	Opéra de Monte-Carlo	Monte Carlo, Monaco
2024	The Addams Family	Gomez Addams	London Palladium	West End
2024	Songbird	Piquillo	Kennedy Center	Washington National Opera
2024	Titanic	Frederick Barrett	New York City Center	Off-Broadway; Encores!
2024	A Face in the Crowd	Lonesone Rhodes	Young Vic Theatre	London
2024	Dirty Rotten Scoundrels	Freddy Benson	London Palladium	West End
2025	Nine	Guido Contini	The Lowry	Salford
2025	Pirates! The Penzance Musical	The Pirate King	Todd Haimes Theatre	Broadway
2025	Dirty Rotten Scoundrels	Freddy Benson	Tokyu Theatre Orb	Tokyo, Japan
2026	Jane Eyre	Edward Rochester	Lincoln Center	Concert
2026	Sweeney Todd: The Demon Barber of Fleet Street	Sweeney Todd	Birmingham Repertory Theatre	Birmingham
2026	The Phantom of the Opera	The Phantom of the Opera	Shanghai Grand Theatre	International tour

== Filmography ==
=== Film ===
Year	Title	Role	Notes
2001	Flipside	Paul	Short film
2004	The Phantom of the Opera	Gustave Daaé	Cameo
2010	Les Misérables in Concert: The 25th Anniversary	Enjolras	Filmed concert
2011	The Phantom of the Opera at the Royal Albert Hall	The Phantom	Filmed concert
2012	The Rain	Sam	Short film
2013	Vendetta	New York Thug	
2018	Nativity Rocks!	Doru's Dad	
2022	Tomorrow Morning	Bill/Will	
2023	The Stratum	William Wright	
2023	Bound	Owais	

=== Television ===
Year	Title	Role	Notes
2011	Life's Too Short	Scientologist	Episode 5
2013	The Spa	Costas	4 episodes
2015	Blue Bloods	Barry Hamidi	Episode: "Worst Case Scenario"
2019	Jesus: His Life	Joseph	4 episodes
2019–2021	Holby City	Kian Madani	Main role; 68 episodes
2025–present	Your Friends & Neighbors	Bruce Emerson	Recurring role; 7 episodes

== Discography ==
Title	Album details	Chart positions
Title	Album details	UK
Ramin	Released: April 9, 2012; Label: Sony Music; Formats: CD, digital download	16
From Now On	Released: August 2, 2019; Label: Sony Music; Formats: CD, digital download	

Karimloo co-wrote the song "Why Am I Falling" with composers Daniel and Laura Curtis for the BBC Children in Need 2013 appeal.

In March 2014, he released the EP The Road to Find Out: East, including the tracks "Oh, What A Beautiful Morning" from the musical Oklahoma!; "Losing", which he and Hadley Fraser wrote for their band, Sheytoons; "Empty Chairs at Empty Tables" from the musical Les Misérables; and "Broken", another song written by Karimloo and Fraser for Sheytoons.

In 2016, Karimloo released his second EP, The Road to Find Out: South, including the tracks "Wings", which he co-wrote with Fraser; "Traveller's Eyes", a song he wrote with his other band, The Broadgrass Band; "Edelweiss" from the musical The Sound of Music; "Letting the Last One Go", another song he wrote for The Broadgrass Band; and "Old Man River" from the musical Show Boat. He went on a UK tour, Lead Me Home, to promote the EP from January 12 to 29, 2017.

In 2022, Karimloo released his third EP, "The Road to Find Out: North", including the tracks "Driftwood", "Music of the Night", "I Vow thee to my Country", "When Does it Go Away", "Once Upon A December", and "Androgynous". He went on concert performances to promote the EP.

In May 2023 Karimloo released his Fourth and final EP "The Road To Find Out: West', including the tracks "The Road To Find Out / Wild World", "Feed The Birds", "Solitude", "Hushabye Mountain", "Bring Him Home", and "Will The Circle Be Unbroken?". He went on concert performances to promote the EP.

In 2025, Karimloo was featured on "Under Your Shadow", part of The Crooked Moon soundtrack by The Blasting Company.

== Awards and nominations ==
Year	Award	Category	Work	Result
2010	BroadwayWorld Award	Best Leading Actor in a Musical	Love Never Dies	Won
2011	WhatsOnStage Awards	Best Actor in a Musical	Love Never Dies	Won
2011	Laurence Olivier Award	Best Actor in a Musical	Love Never Dies	Nominated
2013	WhatsOnStage Awards	Best Takeover in a Role	Les Misérables	Won
2014	Tony Award	Best Actor in a Musical	Les Misérables	Nominated
2014	Drama League Award	Distinguished Performance	Les Misérables	Nominated
2014	Theatre World Award		Les Misérables	Won
2014	Dora Award	Outstanding Male Performance in a Musical	Les Misérables	Nominated
2017	WhatsOnStage Awards	Best Actor in a Musical	Murder Ballad	Nominated
2022	Broadway.com Audience Choice Awards	Favorite Leading Actor in a Musical	Funny Girl	Nominated
2022	BroadwayWorld New Jersey Awards	Best Performer in a Musical	The Last Match: A Pro-Wrestling Rock Musical	Won
2025	Broadway.com Audience Choice Awards	Favorite Leading Actor in a Musical	Pirates! The Penzance Musical	Nominated
