= The Crooked Moon =

Adventure module for D&D

- Cover art of the version for the 2024 revision of Dungeons & Dragons's 5th edition
- Rules required: Dungeons & Dragons 5e & 5.5e editions
- Character levels: 1-13, with optional adventures up to level 20
- Authors: Mikey Gilder, Dan Dillon, Tommy Gofton, James J. Haeck, Derek Hudson, Seen-Foong Lim, Ginny Loveday, Paladin Mendenhall, Shawn Merwin, Adam Novitch, Nikkie Pacheco, Alan Patrick, Jeri Red Sheperd, Brandes Stoddard, Elisa Teague, KP Upadhyayula, B. Dave Walters, Toni Winslow-Brill
- First published: June 16, 2025 (D&D Beyond); October 29, 2025 (physical)

The Crooked Moon is an adventure module published for Avantris Entertainment for the Dungeons & Dragons fantasy role-playing game. It had a digital release on D&D Beyond on June 16, 2025, followed by a physical release on October 29, 2025, in two versions: one for the 5th Edition of Dungeons & Dragons, and the other for the 5.5 Edition of Dungeons & Dragons.

The Crooked Moon is a folk horror story set in Druskenvald, a realm between the mortal planes and the afterlife, where the party are newcomers who must make their way through a dangerous land in which lurks a powerful entity known as the Crooked Queen. The module's setting is inspired by the campaign setting used in the Edge of Midnight campaign, an actual play from Legends of Avantris, which premiered in 2021. Development of The Crooked Moon was funded via Kickstarter and raised over $4 million.

The Crooked Moon won five awards, including Product of the Year, at the 2026 ENNIE Awards. Avantris Entertainment additionally won the Fan Award for Best Publisher.

== Contents ==
=== Story summary ===
The campaign takes place in Druskenvald, specifically the region of Wickermoor Hollow. Druskenvald is surrounded by the Shroud, a mystical boundary impenetrable to most beings. The player characters are a group of newcomers who travel through the Shroud aboard the Ghostlight Express train and battle primal forces in the land while investigating strange events taking place.

=== Gameplay ===
The regular campaign takes player characters from level 1 to 13, with additional boss battle content allowing optional progression to level 20. The module includes 13 species, 15 subclasses, 40 spells, and 85 enemy monsters.

In addition, The Crooked Moon adds 13 new species to Dungeons & Dragons 5th Edition, coinciding with the 13 regions of Druskenvald: the imp-like Ashborn, the harpy-like Azureborn, the troll-like swamp-originating Bogborn, the werewolf-like Curseborn, the fish-like Deepborn, the tree-like Gnarlborn, the ghoul-like Graveborn, the scarecrow-like Harvestborn, the rat-like Plagueborn, the skeleton-like Relicborn, the spider-like Silkborn, the gargoyle-like Stoneborn, and the doll-like Threadborn.

== Publication history ==
=== Creative origins and Kickstarter ===
The Crooked Moon draws inspiration from the setting used by the web series Legends of Avantris in their original Edge of Midnight actual play campaign. Avantris Entertainment co-founder Derek Hudson explained that The Crooked Moon uses the "Folk Horror Chain", a subgenre of horror "developed by folk horror scholar Adam Scovell", as its "narrative structure" and this "is key to making D&D's power fantasy mechanics feel more like horror".

In October 2023, Legends of Avantris launched a Kickstarter to publish the module that would eventually contain an all-in-one Dungeons & Dragons 5th Edition setting and campaign sourcebook. The original score of The Crooked Moon was composed by The Blasting Company in collaboration with Avantris Entertainment. Other rewards included the digital and hardcover editions of The Crooked Moon, a tarot card deck, and pre-printed miniatures. The campaign became the most successful Dungeons & Dragons 5th Edition campaign in history, reaching over $4 million.

=== Release ===
In late 2024, Legends of Avantris released a digital alpha version of The Crooked Moon for their Kickstarter backers. They also announced that The Crooked Moon would have two versions: one meant for 5e Dungeons & Dragons, and another for 5.5e. Both rulesets have a physical edition.

The first digital edition was released to Kickstarter bakers in March 2025; the D&D Beyond digital edition was released on June 16, 2025. The D&D Beyond version splits the sourcebook into two parts: the Player Options & Campaign Setting book and the Monsters & Adventure Campaign book. The hardcover sourcebook was later released for retail in 2025 and consists of 632 pages. Kickstarter bakers received the hardcover sourcebook over the course of 2025 and 2026.

The Crooked Moon was subsequently released digitally for other virtual tabletops such as Roll20, Foundry VTT and Alchemy.

== Reception ==
John Dodd, for the UK print magazine Tabletop Gaming, called the The Crooked Moon "an incredible campaign that's evocative and engaging", praising the artwork as "superb" and the writing as "clear and evocative". Andrew Stretch of TechRaptor called it "an absolute delight" and "a tense but whimsical adventure from start to finish", concluding: "For a DM, this game sets a gold standard. From the adventure preamble and history lesson, to plenty of clear references and a way to include characters' personal stories in the adventure clearer, The Crooked Moon handles a lot of the prep for you so that you can just enjoy running the game." The Crooked Moon appeared on Game Informer's "The Best Tabletop RPGs Of 2025" list — Matt Miller wrote that "Avantris has taken a comprehensive approach to refreshing D&D", noting that many role-playing game players are "hesitant" to try systems besides Dungeons & Dragons "but are eager to try something that dramatically changes the surrounding trappings" which is "precisely what you get with The Crooked Moon". Miller praised the length of sourcebook, including dedicating 350 pages to the adventure. Miller also highlighted its "innovative fateweaving system that aims to connect the main campaign narrative back to individual character backstories".

=== Awards ===
Year	Award	Category	Recipient(s)	Result	Ref.
2026	ENNIE Awards	Best Aid/Accessory – Digital	The Crooked Moon Alchemy VTT (Avantris Entertainment, WestMarches.games, and Grimoire AB)	Gold Winner	
2026	ENNIE Awards	Best Aid/Accessory – Non–Digital	The Crooked Moon Tarot Card Set (Avantris Entertainment)	Gold Winner	
2026	ENNIE Awards	Best Art, Cover	The Crooked Moon Standard Edition Hardcover (Avantris Entertainment, artist Xavier Collette)	Gold Winner	
2026	ENNIE Awards	Best Production Values	The Crooked Moon Ultimate Edition (Avantris Entertainment)	Gold Winner	
2026	ENNIE Awards	Product of the Year	The Crooked Moon Ultimate Edition (Avantris Entertainment)	Gold Winner	

== Other media ==
=== Soundtrack ===
A soundtrack for The Crooked Moon was developed in collaboration with The Blasting Company. The single "Crooked Moon" featuring Leonie Evans was released in 2023 alongside the Kickstarter. Seven additional singles ("Coal Eyed Birds", "By the Lagoon", "Dead Trees", "Under Your Shadow", "Light of My Life", "Cold Iron", "Nightwind") were released throughout 2024 and 2025 before the full soundtrack album released in 2026.

All tracks are written by The Blasting Company and Avantris Entertainment.

No.	Title	Length
1.	"Crooked Moon - Extended Version" (feat. Leonie Evans)	4:04
2.	"When It's Time" (feat. Willie Watson)	3:23
3.	"Impossible" (feat. Haley Reinhart, Dez Duron)	3:53
4.	"The Echoes" (feat. Puddles Pity Party)	4:24
5.	"Coal Eyed Birds" (feat. Frank Fairfield, Justin Rubenstein)	3:40
6.	"Under Your Shadow" (feat. Ramin Karimloo)	4:07
7.	"By the Lagoon" (feat. Jerron Paxton)	3:43
8.	"Lullaby of the Sea" (feat. Cynthia Harrell)	4:30
9.	"Dead Trees" (feat. Ekaterina Shelehova)	3:55
10.	"Cold Iron" (feat. Jemaine Clement)	3:58
11.	"No Fun to Die" (feat. Tom Kenny)	5:31
12.	"Sing Ye Vermin" (feat. Varo)	4:32
13.	"Light of My Life" (feat. Haley Reinhart)	4:26
14.	"Born King" (feat. Annapantsu, Dez Duron)	3:57
15.	"Nightwind" (feat. Willie Watson)	3:54
Total length:		1:01:57

The Blasting Company also released two instrumental albums in 2025. "Sword and Seal" features combat-related tracks and "Hungry Woods" features atmospheric tracks.
