= Politeama Rossetti =

Theatre in Trieste, Italy

Coordinates: 45°39′09″N 13°47′05″E

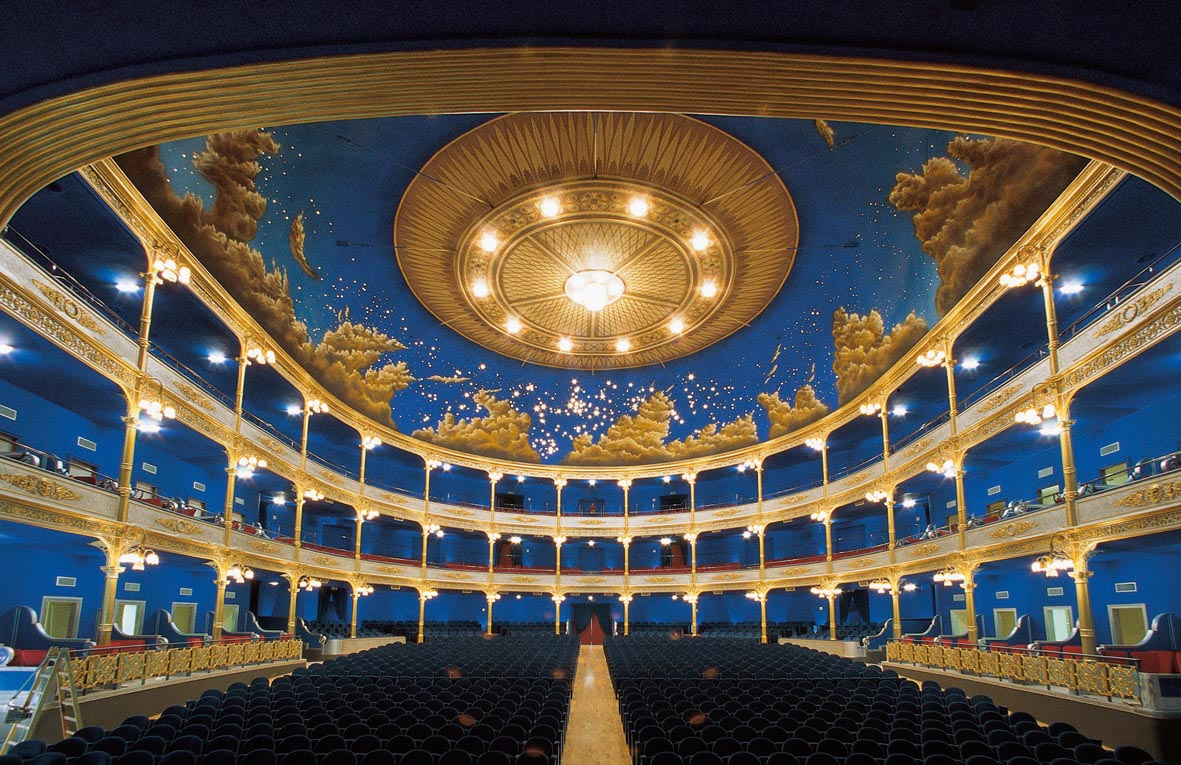
Interior

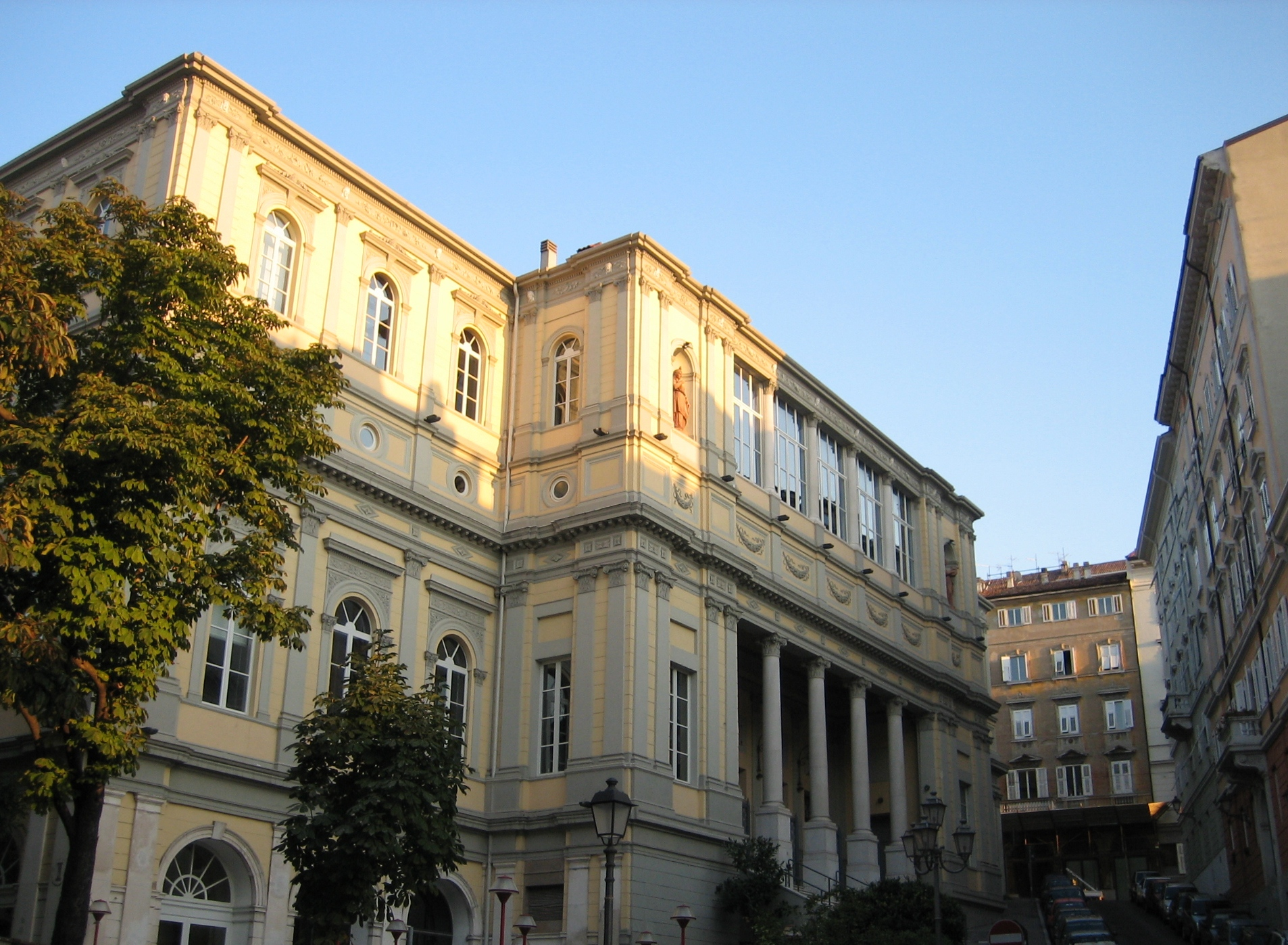
Façade

Politeama Rossetti is a theatre in the Italian city of Trieste. With over 60 shows scheduled each season, running from October to June, its stage shows include plays, musicals, ballet, dance and rock concerts.

It is the home of Teatro Stabile del Friuli Venezia Giulia, one of Italy's oldest and major public theatres, founded in 1954. The artistic director is Paolo Valerio.

The theatre was built in 1878 and designed by Nicolò Bruno. It was heavily restored in 1928, 1969 and 1999. While the original capacity was over 5,000, it can now sit 1,531. It has two major performing spaces, the main hall, called Sala Assicurazioni Generali, and a studio theatre called "Sala Bartoli", with a capacity of 128 seats.

The shows presented in the season are either the own productions of Teatro Stabile del Friuli Venezia Giulia, or visiting productions from Italy and abroad. Among its own productions, the theatre presents classic works by William Shakespeare, Carlo Goldoni, Italo Svevo and many others, as well as contemporary work by Italian and international playwrights.

In the recent years the theatre has specialised in the presentation of major West End and Broadway musicals, including the original productions of Cats in 2008, Mamma Mia!, The Rocky Horror Show and Chicago in 2009. In 2010 the theatre staged We Will Rock You, featuring the music of Queen, the acclaimed 50th anniversary production of West Side Story and Andrew Lloyd Webber's Evita. Since 2011, the theatre hosted the Italian premieres of the musicals Chess, Spamalot, Sunset Boulevard, Six and Come From Away. In summer 2023 the theatre hosted the Italian premiere of Andrew Lloyd Webber's The Phantom of the Opera directed by Federico Bellone and starring Ramin Karimloo, Amelia Milo, and Bradley Jaden. In 2024 Politeama Rossetti hosted the Italian premiere of the world tour of Les Misérables.
