= JFK: 3 Shots That Changed America =

2009 television film

- Genre: Historical documentary
- Directed by: Nicole Rittenmeyer; Seth Skundrick
- Theme music composer: Paul Brill
- Country of origin: United States
- Original language: English

Production
- Producers: Katerina Simic; Hugo Soskin; Elizabeth Tyson
- Editors: Katerina Simic; Seth Skundrick
- Running time: 188 minutes
- Production company: Disney

Original release
- Network: History Channel
- Release: October 11, 2009

JFK: 3 Shots That Changed America is an American historical documentary about the assassination of President John F. Kennedy. It premiered on the History Channel on Sunday, October 11, 2009 and was released on DVD on January 26, 2010.

== Overview ==
The film is an unnarrated collection of archived news and home movie footage shot as events unfolded, some of it rarely seen. Part one deals with the time from President Kennedy's arrival in Dallas on November 22, 1963 through the murder of Lee Harvey Oswald less than 48 hours later.

Part two deals with the Warren Commission, its critics and those who suspect a conspiracy, the assassinations of Martin Luther King Jr. and Robert F. Kennedy in 1968 and the turmoil that followed, and the continuing doubt about the assassinations and the effects this has had on American society.

== Awards ==
The film won the FOCAL International Award for Best Use of Footage In Factual Productions.

== See also ==
- Assassination of John F. Kennedy in popular culture
