= The Blasting Company =

American nouveau-Folk band

- The Blasting Company performing with Patrick McHale (2026)

Background information
- Also known as: The Petrojvic Blasting Company
- Origin: Los Angeles, California
- Genres: Eastern European Folk; American Folk; Jazz
- Years active: 2008–present
- Members: 5, including: Justin Rubenstein; J.R. Kaufman; Charles De Castro; Cory Beers; Brandon Armstrong
- Website: blastingcompany.com

The Blasting Company, formerly known as the Petrojvic Blasting Company, is an American nouveau-folk band based in Los Angeles, California. The band was founded in 2008 by half-brothers Justin Rubenstein and J.R. Kaufman, with the group expanding to anywhere from five to ten members later.

The band composed the soundtrack for the Cartoon Network mini-series Over the Garden Wall.

== History ==
The Blasting Company originally started as a street band called Albania Mania, with music inspired by Serbian folk songs. The band began with half-brothers Justin Rubenstein and Josh Kaufman (Note: The brothers often referred to themselves at the Petrojvic brothers in the band's early days and several sources still refer to them using these names.) but expanded to include a rotation group of anywhere from six to ten members during their busking days. Starting from their home state of Tennessee, the brothers traveled around the country, typically playing on the street with anyone willing to join the band.

In the band's early traveling days, they traveled in a school bus converted to run off vegetable oil. Most members were transient during this time, with Rubenstein and Kaufman as the only consistent members. Brandon Armstrong, who briefly played with the band early in their travels, would later join the band as a full-time member while composing for Over the Garden Wall. The band later learned that Armstrong had written the paperwork for the grant money used to convert the school bus as a Greenpeace employee before meeting any members.

The band claims they changed their name after meeting a Serbian professor of art and sculpture from the Savannah College of Art and Design. The band's bus had broken down in Savannah; while there, they were still busking under the name Albania Mania. The professor, whom they recalled as named Milutin Petrojvic (it is possible that this was a mishearing or misspelling), recommended that they change their name or learn to play Albanian music instead. (The band did not realize that there were historic tensions between the two ethnic groups.) He also invited them to play at a party he was hosting the next day, where he taught them about Serbian folk music. The band chose to rename themselves The Petrojvic Blasting Company, but later removed Petrojvic for fears of misrepresenting themselves as Serbs.

The band later came to prominence as the composers for Over the Garden Wall. Rubenstein said in an interview that series creator Patrick McHale first heard of the band after receiving an early demo tape from a series co-creator.

== Style ==
The band's music is inspired by the music of Eastern Europe, particularly the music of the Balkans, and New Orleans dixie. The band has also been noted for its folk influences and Bohemian style.

The band uses a variety of more orthodox instruments including an accordion, as well as a Bulgarian tapan.

== Performances and projects ==
The band regularly performs in Los Angeles, often playing on Sundays at the Hollywood Farmers' Market.

The band wrote the soundtrack for the television miniseries Over the Garden Wall, for which it was critically acclaimed. The extended version of the soundtrack was debuted at San Diego Comic-Con in 2016.

The band composed the music for the New York Times Serial podcast "The Kids of Rutherford County" about mass incarceration of children in Tennessee.

The band provided the theme for the Kickstarter campaign for the Dungeons & Dragons supplement The Crooked Moon by the Legends of Avantris. The kickstarter went on to earn over $4 million triggering the creation of three albums of music for The Crooked Moon.

The band has contributed music for an upcoming indie game currently in Kickstarter called Layers Deep.

== Discography ==
=== Albums ===
- A Gift To Remember (2008) (As the Petrojvic Blasting Company)
- A History of Public Relations Dilemmae (2010) (As the Petrojvic Blasting Company)
- Over the Garden Wall (2016) (Also includes Elijah Wood, Collin Dean, Jack Jones and others)
- Kids of Rutherford County (2024)
- The Crooked Moon: Hungry Woods (2025)
- The Crooked Moon: Sword and Seal (2025)
- The Crooked Moon (Original Soundtrack) (2026)

=== EPs ===
- Sketches of the Unknown (2020)
- Tiny Star (2020)
- For Hire (2022) (Includes Ashley Nguyen DeWitt)

=== Singles ===
- Candy (2020)
- Old Summer Reckoning (2021) (Co-written by Van Dyke Parks)
- Crooked Moon (2023) (Includes Leonie Evans)
- Coal Eyed Birds (2024) (Includes Frank Fairfield and Justin Rubenstein)
- By the Lagoon (2024) (Includes Jerron Paxton)
- Dead Trees (2025) (Includes Ekaterina Shelehova)
- Under Your Shadow (2025) (Includes Ramin Karimloo)
- Light of My Life (2025) (Includes Haley Reinhart)
- Cold Iron (2025) (Includes Jemaine Clement)
- The Mirror (2025)
- Nightwind (2025) (Includes Willie Watson)
