= Samuel Ramey =

American operatic bass (born 1942)

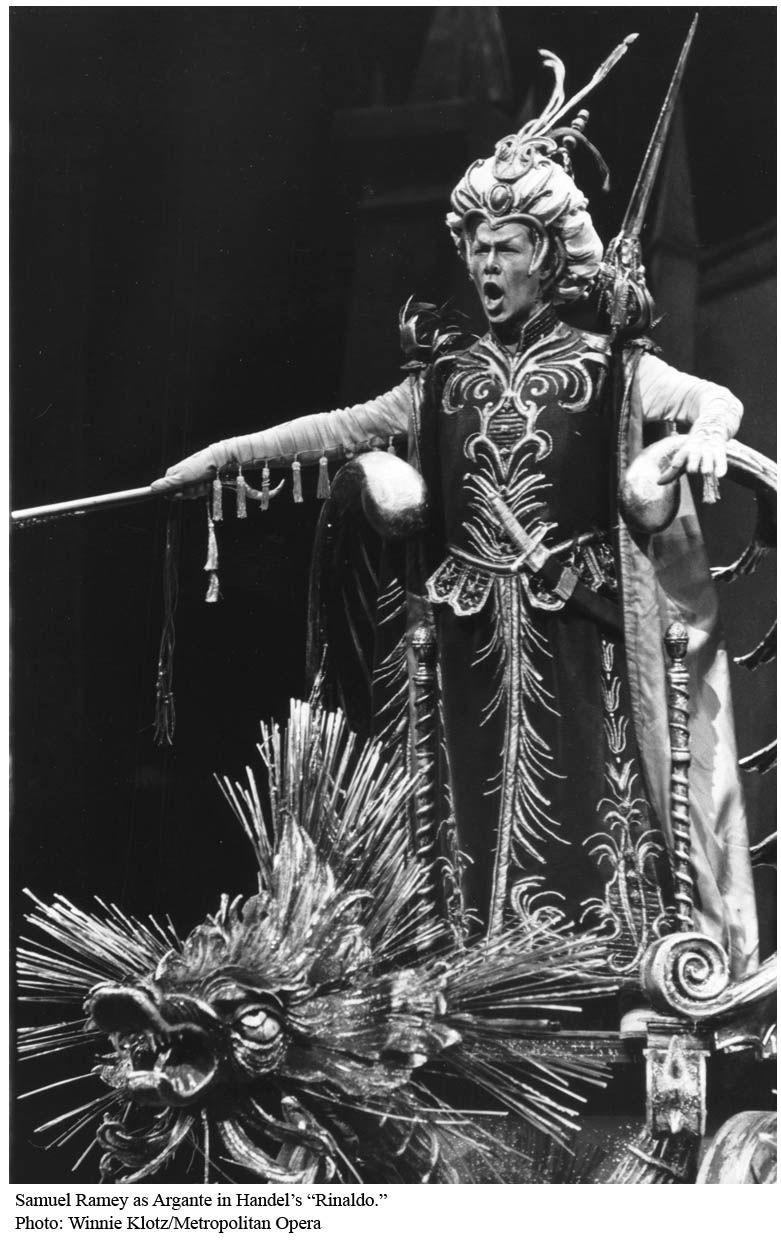
- Ramey performing in Rinaldo in 1984
- Born: March 28, 1942 (age 84); Colby, Kansas, U.S.
- Occupation: Opera singer (bass)
- Years active: 1973–present
- Children: 1

Samuel Ramey (born March 28, 1942) is an American operatic bass. At the height of his career, he was greatly admired for his range and versatility, having possessed a sufficiently accomplished bel canto technique which enabled him to sing the music of Handel, Mozart and Rossini but with enough vocal power to handle the more overtly dramatic roles in Verdi, Puccini, and Meyerbeer operas.

== Early life ==
Ramey graduated from Colby High School in Colby, Kansas in 1960. He studied music in high school and in college at Kansas State University, as well as at Wichita State with Arthur Newman. At Kansas State, he was a member of Kappa Sigma fraternity.

Ramey was in the chorus of Don Giovanni in 1963, with Norman Treigle in the title role, while studying with the Central City Opera in Central City, Colorado. After being an apprentice with the Santa Fe Opera in Santa Fe, New Mexico, he worked for an academic publisher in New York City before he had his first breakthrough while at the New York City Opera debuting on March 11, 1973, as Zuniga in the 1875 Bizet opera Carmen. He took over that role as well as the Faustian devils in Gounod's Faust and Boito's Mefistofele, which was vacated by the early death of Treigle.

As his repertoire expanded he worked extensively in European theaters notably in Berlin, Hamburg, London, Paris, Milan, and Vienna in addition to summer festivals in Aix-en-Provence, Glyndebourne, Pesaro, and Salzburg.

== Later career ==
In January 1984, Ramey made his debut at the Metropolitan Opera in Handel's Rinaldo. He became a fixture at the Teatro alla Scala, Royal Opera House at Covent Garden, Vienna State Opera, the Paris Opera, the Lyric Opera of Chicago, the New York City Opera, the San Francisco Opera and the Teatro Colón in Buenos Aires (Attila, The Rake's Progress, Mefistofele) since then. In July 1985 he was cast as Bertram in the historic revival in Paris of Giacomo Meyerbeer's Robert le diable.

Ramey has sung in Mozart's Don Giovanni and The Marriage of Figaro and, in the bel canto repertoire, in Rossini's Semiramide, The Barber of Seville, Il Turco in Italia, L'italiana in Algeri, and La Gazza Ladra; in Donizetti's Anna Bolena and Lucia di Lammermoor and Bellini's I puritani. In the dramatic repertoire, Ramey has been acclaimed for his "Three Devils": Boito's Mefistofele, Gounod's Faust and Berlioz's dramatic legend Damnation of Faust. Other dramatic roles of his have included Verdi's Nabucco, Don Carlo, I masnadieri, I Lombardi and Jérusalem, as well as Offenbach's Tales of Hoffmann (he portrayed all four villains).

In 1990, he sang the role of Joe in Jerome Kern's Show Boat in a concert performance at Avery Fisher Hall with Jerry Hadley and Frederica von Stade. A number of previously obscure operas with strong bass/bass-baritone roles have been revived solely for Ramey, such as Verdi's Attila, Rossini's Maometto II and Massenet's Don Quichotte. He provided the voice for The Beast, the main antagonist of the 2014 animated miniseries Over the Garden Wall. In 1996, he gave a concert at New York's Avery Fisher Hall titled "A Date with the Devil" in which he sang 14 arias representing the core of this repertory. He continued to tour with the program throughout the world. In 2000, he presented the concert at Munich's Gasteig Concert Hall. The performance was recorded live and was released on compact disc in summer 2002. In 2007, Ramey appeared with Wichita Grand Opera as Baron Scarpia in Puccini's Tosca, opposite Annalisa Raspagliosi in the title role, under the baton of Nayden Todorov.

He formerly served as a member of the faculty at Roosevelt University's Chicago College of Performing Arts and is currently a distinguished professor of Opera at Wichita State University's School of Music. He was named an inaugural member of the WSU College of Fine Arts Hall of Fame in 2015. He is a national patron of Delta Omicron, an international professional music fraternity. He reprised the title role of "Duke Bluebeard" in Opera Omaha's production of Béla Bartók's Bluebeard's Castle in April 2013 in Omaha, Nebraska.

Ramey portrayed the Beast in the 2014 animated miniseries Over the Garden Wall, for which he also provided bass vocals and performed the song "Come Wayward Souls".

=== Recordings ===
Ramey has made an exceptionally high number of recordings documenting many of his main operatic roles as well as collections of miscellaneous arias, other classical pieces, and crossover discs of popular American music. He has appeared on television and video productions of the Met's productions of Carmen and Bluebeard's Castle, San Francisco's production of Mefistofele, Glyndebourne's production of The Rake's Progress, and Salzburg's production of Don Giovanni.

== Family ==
He married his third wife, soprano Lindsey Larsen, on June 29, 2002. They have one son.

== Repertoire ==
Repertoire
Role	Opera	Composer
Bluebeard	Bluebeard's Castle	Bartók
Dr Pangloss	Candide	Bernstein
Oroveso	Norma	Bellini
Sir Giorgio	I puritani	Bellini
Méphistophélès	La damnation de Faust	Berlioz
Escamillo	Carmen	Bizet
Mefistofele	Mefistofele	Boito
John Claggart	Billy Budd	Britten
Riccardo III	Riccardo III	Canepa
La Père	Louise	Charpentier
Enrico VIII	Anna Bolena	Donizetti
Raimondo Bidebent	Lucia di Lammermoor	Donizetti
Andrea Cornaro	Caterina Cornaro	Donizetti
Olin	Susannah	Floyd
Méphistophélès	Faust	Gounod
Argante	Rinaldo	Handel
Garibaldo	Rodelinda	Handel
Il Re di Scozia	Ariodante	Handel
Cadmus	Semele	Handel
Somnus	Semele	Handel
Idreno	Armida	Haydn
Le Comte Des Grieux	Manon	Massenet
Le Comte	Chérubin	Massenet
Don Quichotte	Don Quichotte	Massenet
Bertram	Robert le diable	Meyerbeer
Archibald	L'amore dei tre re	Montemezzi
Figaro	Le nozze di Figaro	Mozart
Don Giovanni	Don Giovanni	Mozart
Leporello	Don Giovanni	Mozart
Sarastro	Die Zauberflöte	Mozart
Boris Godunov	Boris Godunov	Mussorgsky
Pimen	Boris Godunov	Mussorgsky
Coppelius	Les contes d'Hoffmann	Offenbach
Dapertutto	Les contes d'Hoffmann	Offenbach
Lindorf	Les contes d'Hoffmann	Offenbach
Miracle	Les contes d'Hoffmann	Offenbach
Alvise Badoero	La Gioconda	Ponchielli
Kutuzov	War and Peace	Prokofiev
Colline	La bohème	Puccini
Barone Scarpia	Tosca	Puccini
Cesare Angelotti	Tosca	Puccini
Rambaldo	La rondine	Puccini
Timur	Turandot	Puccini
Gaudenzio	Il signor Bruschino	Rossini
Mustafà	L'italiana in Algeri	Rossini
Selim	Il turco in Italia	Rossini
Don Basilio	Il barbiere di Siviglia	Rossini
Elmiro	Otello	Rossini
Podestà Gottardo	La gazza ladra	Rossini
Douglas d'Angus	La donna del lago	Rossini
Maometto secondo	Maometto secondo	Rossini
Assur	Semiramide	Rossini
Lord Sidney	Il viaggio a Reims	Rossini
Moïse	Mosè in Egitto	Rossini
Le Gouverneur	Le comte Ory	Rossini
Un vecchio ebreo	Samson et Dalila	Saint-Saëns
Orest	Elektra	Strauss
Nick Shadow	The Rake's Progress	Stravinsky
Prince Gremin	Eugene Onegin	Tchaikovsky
Claudius	Hamlet	Thomas
Oberto	Oberto, Conte di San Bonifacio	Verdi
Zaccaria	Nabucco	Verdi
Pagano	I Lombardi alla prima crociata	Verdi
Jacopo Loredano	I due Foscari	Verdi
Attila	Attila	Verdi
Leone	Attila	Verdi
Banco	Macbeth	Verdi
Massimiliano Moor	I masnadieri	Verdi
Comte de Toulouse	Jérusalem	Verdi
Wurm	Luisa Miller	Verdi
Monterone	Rigoletto	Verdi
Sparafucile	Rigoletto	Verdi
Padre Guardiano	La forza del destino	Verdi
Filippo II	Don Carlos	Verdi
Il Grande Inquisitore	Don Carlos	Verdi
Ramfis	Aida	Verdi

== Select discography ==
- Bernstein: On the Town, conducted by Michael Tilson Thomas, Deutsche Grammophon
- Handel: Messiah, conducted by Andrew Davis, EMI
- Massenet: Chérubin, conducted by Pinchas Steinberg, RCA Victor Red Seal
- Mozart: Le nozze di Figaro, conducted by Georg Solti, Decca
- Rossini: Otello, conducted by Jesús López Cobos, Philips
- Rossini: The Rossini Bicentennial Birthday Gala, conducted by Roger Norrington, EMI
- Marilyn Horne: Divas in Song, RCA Victor Red Seal
- A Salute to American Music (Richard Tucker Music Foundation Gala XVI, 1991), conducted by James Conlon, RCA Victor Red Seal
- Mozart: Don Giovanni, conducted by Herbert von Karajan, Deutsche Grammophon

== Select videography ==
- The Metropolitan Opera Gala 1991, conducted by James Levine, Deutsche Grammophon

== Sources ==
- Samuel Ramey's website, samuelramey.com; retrieved January 25, 2010.
- Ramey with Bach cantata recordings, bach-cantatas.com; retrieved July 25, 2010.
- List of "Articles on Samuel Ramey", nytimes.com; retrieved July 25, 2010.
- Scovell, Jane, Samuel Ramey: American Bass, Baskerville Publishers, 2010; ISBN 978-1-880909-76-8

== YouTube ==
- Samuel Ramey's Youtube Channel
- On YouTube, singing THE MESSIAH
- 73 year-old Samuel Ramey singing the role of Grand Inquisitor in DON CARLO.
- Samuel Ramey in the 'Commendatore Scene' from the Metropolitan Opera's 1990 production of Don Giovanni, with Kurt Moll and Ferruccio Furlanetto
