= Ramin (album) =

Studio album by Ramin Karimloo
- Released: April 9, 2012
- Recorded: 2011
- Genre: Pop
- Label: Sony Music Entertainment

Ramin, renamed Human Heart in the United States, is the debut studio album from Iranian-born Canadian actor and singer Ramin Karimloo. It was released in the UK on April 9, 2012.

== Background ==
Karimloo released his album in the UK on April 9, 2012 after several months of promotion. He ended his West End run as Jean Valjean on the week preceding the album's release in order to prepare for a series of signings and further promotion before embarking on a major tour which will take him to venues in London, Oxford, Southend, Manchester, Nottingham, Birmingham, Gateshead, and Cardiff in the UK and New York, Charlotte, Atlanta, Philadelphia, Washington, Bethlehem, Chicago, and Pittsburgh in the US. He is also visiting Toronto in his native Canada.

Karimloo said in anticipation of the album: "I have a huge love for country and bluegrass, I love rock 'n' roll and I love what I'm doing, so it was how to balance all that". He went on to say, "I didn't want to be just a theatre star putting out an album. It was only when they started talking about writing and bringing in other writers that I got interested. I wanted to have lived the songs. I wanted an album that was like a diary." He has cited influences as diverse as The Tragically Hip, Johnny Cash and Mumford and Sons, and so a straightforward West End leading man album of covers was never really on the cards, says Karimloo, "I wanted to marry that rocky sound with things that people know me more for". The album was produced by Tom Nichols, who has worked with world-class vocalists from Céline Dion to Hayley Westenra. It includes not only his own compositions but also covers of Bryan Adams and Muse songs, having as well his own take on "Music of the Night" from The Phantom of the Opera and "'Til I Hear You Sing" from Love Never Dies.

== Promotion ==
Karimloo promoted the album on QVC. He performed "Music of the Night" and "Coming Home". He also performed the song "Constant Angel" on the BBC show Songs of Praise.

== Track listing ==
No.	Title	Length
1.	"Show Me Light"	4:06
2.	"Coming Home"	4:56
3.	"Music of the Night"	4:17
4.	"Broken Home"	3:43
5.	"Guiding Light"	4:04
6.	"Song of the Human Heart"	5:45
7.	"Constant Angel"	3:54
8.	"'Til I Hear You Sing"	4:02
9.	"Eyes of a Child"	3:20
10.	"Inside My World"	3:44
11.	"Everything I Do (I Do It for You)"	3:49
12.	"Cathedrals"	4:06

== Chart performance ==
On April 11, 2012 his album was on course to debut at number sixteen on the UK Albums Chart.

Chart (2012)	Peak position
UK Albums Chart	16

== Release history ==
Country	Release date	Format	Label
United Kingdom	6 April 2012	Digital download	Sony Music Entertainment
United Kingdom	9 April 2012	CD	Sony Music Entertainment
