= Willie Watson (musician) =

American singer-songwriter (born 1979)

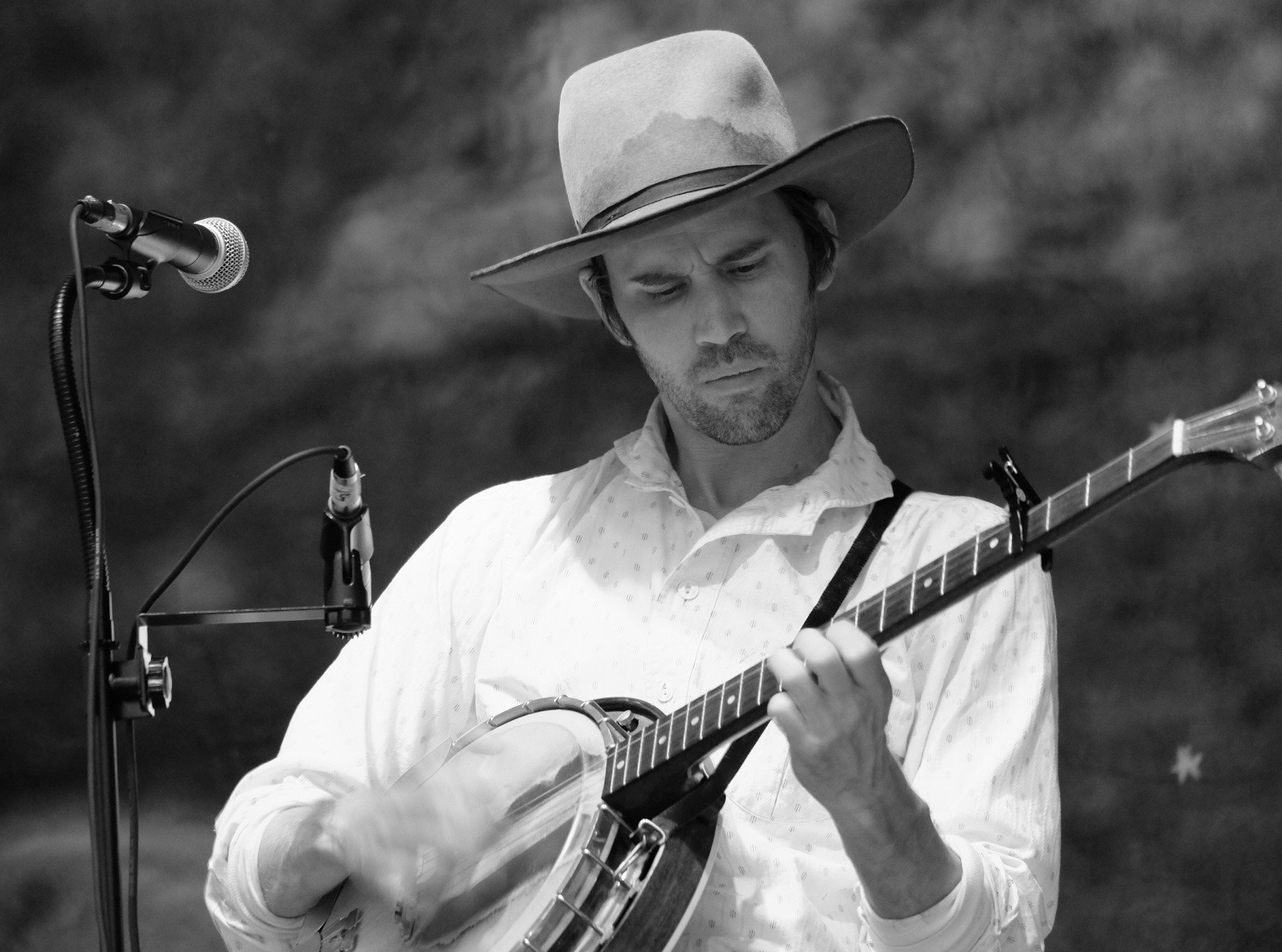
- Playing five-string banjo Ossipee Valley Music Festival in Hiram, Maine; July 25, 2014.

Background information
- Born: William Currie Watson; September 23, 1979 (age 47); Watkins Glen, New York, U.S.
- Genres: Bluegrass; folk
- Occupation: Musician
- Instruments: Guitar, banjo, harmonica, vocals
- Years active: 1996–present
- Label: Acony Records
- Formerly of: Old Crow Medicine Show
- Spouse: Mindy
- Website: Official website

William Currie Watson (born September 23, 1979) is an American singer-songwriter, guitarist, banjo player, actor and founding member of Old Crow Medicine Show. His debut solo album Folk Singer, Vol. I, was released in May 2014; its follow-up Folksinger, Vol. 2 was released September 15, 2017 on Acony Records. He has appeared at the Newport Folk Festival and other major music festivals. He released a self-titled album of his first collection of self-penned songs on September 13, 2024. He currently resides in the Woodland Hills district of Los Angeles.

Watson appears as The Kid in Joel and Ethan Coen's 2018 film The Ballad of Buster Scruggs, also performing on the soundtrack.

== Biography ==
=== Early ===
William Currie Watson was born in Watkins Glen, New York (Schuyler County), and raised there, in Upstate New York, around Ithaca. Growing up in the ‘80s and ‘90s, Watson listened to music on the radio – from Michael Jackson to Nirvana – but also his father's record albums, including The Rolling Stones and Neil Young. He recalls:

I was just exposed to all kinds of stuff and . . . it could have been anything, and I would still be playing music because I could sing like anybody or anything I wanted to. I guess I still can . . . That's why I feel so fortunate – a lot of people don't have that, and I never take it for granted. I found a direction in life at a very young age.

He first met Ben Gould in high school and they began playing music together. Around Ithaca and next-door Tompkins County "a lot of old-time fiddle music" was being played, some of it by banjo player Richie Stearns and the group Donna The Buffalo. Watson was exposed to old-time music firsthand at a weekly old-time jam.

Both Watson and Gould dropped out of school and formed the band The Funnest Game, which like Richie Stearns' group The Horse Flies had "clawhammer banjo, electric guitar, drums." Their brand of electric/old-time was heavily influenced by the old-time scene prominent in Tompkins and Schuyler County, New York, including The Horse Flies and The Highwoods Stringband. Performing locally, the young band earned the respect of local musicians and gained a following, appearing weekly at the Rongovian Embassy with Richie Stearns and annually at the Finger Lakes GrassRoots Festival of Music and Dance in Trumansburg, New York.

Future bandmate Ketch Secor described it as a "young folksy kind of jam element acoustic band that was really popular in the southern tier region of New York State." Watson, he says, "was playing shows statewide by the time he was sixteen" with "this group that had some congas and some clawhammer banjo."

=== Old Crow Medicine Show ===
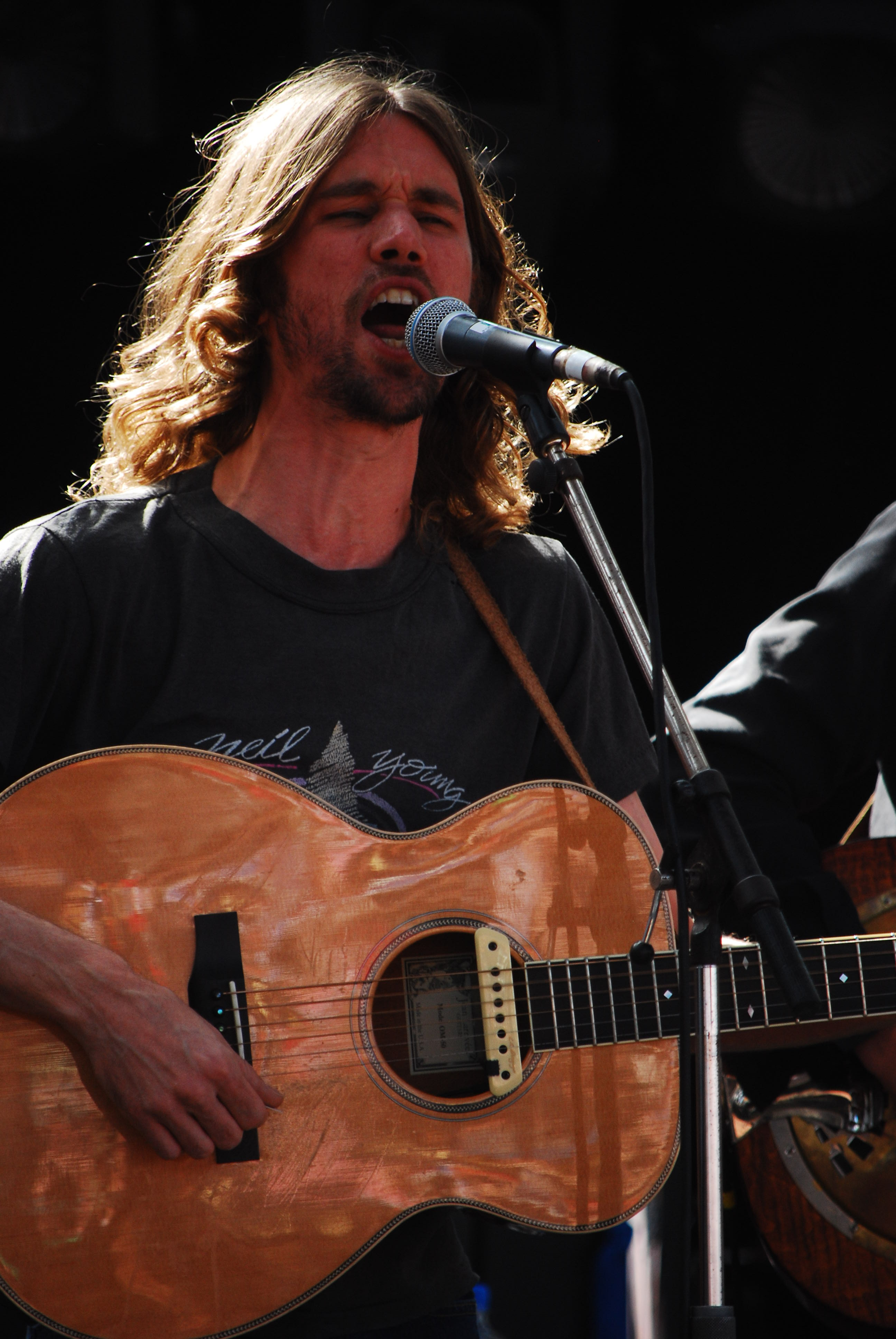
Playing guitar with Old Crow Medicine Show at Golden Plains music festival in Australia March 8, 2009.

Watson met future co-founder of Old Crow Medicine Show Ketch Secor after the latter finished high school in New Hampshire, his band broke up in Virginia, and he enrolled in Ithaca College. Secor brought friend and former bandmate Chris "Critter" Fuqua up to New York State from Virginia. Watson dissolved The Funnest Game while the three assembled musicians around Ithaca, New York "where there is a very lively old-time music scene." According to Mac Benford, Ithaca had for 40 years "been a center of old time music, nationally," including Kevin Hayes They recorded Trans:mission, a cassette of ten songs they could sell on the road.

Ithaca and that surrounding area was a big influence on us. We wouldn't be here without a lot of the people we met there, like Richie Stearns, the Red Hots and Mac Benford. All those old-time banjo players brought the music from the South back up to New York, and it was kind of a hotbed.

— Critter Fuqua

The group left Ithaca for their Trans:mission tour in October 1998, busking west across Canada. They circled back east in Spring of 1999 and moved into a farmhouse on Beech Mountain, near Boone, North Carolina. They were embraced by the Appalachian community, and their repertoire of old-time songs grew as they played with local musicians."

After being discovered busking in Boone, North Carolina by Doc Watson—while "playing on Doc's old corner" where he'd "started playing in the 1950s" on King Street —the famed folk-country legend said, "Boys, that was some of the most authentic old-time music I've heard in a long while. You almost got me crying." Doc invited the band to participate in his annual MerleFest music festival, founded in 1988 in memory of Doc's son Eddy Merle Watson, who died in a farm tractor accident in 1985, as a fundraiser for Wilkes Community College and to celebrate "traditional plus" music. There they met Gillian Welch and Dave Rawlings who introduced them to the Nashville music scene, where they promptly relocated.

Watson performed with the group, writing and singing many of their more notable songs. He left to embark on a solo career in the autumn of 2011, a couple months before Fuqua rejoined the group, citing time on the road, new parenthood, and direction the band was headed as reasons for the split.

=== Solo career ===
Watson's transition to solo appearances began slowly with an invitation from siblings Sean and Sara Watkins to join them on a Cayamo cruise—a "singer-songwriter, folk, rootsy festival on a ship around the Bahamas." Sean "took the liberty" of putting Watson on the performance schedule. He subsequently would "go pretty often and ... sing a few songs" at "this little revue called the Watkins Family Hour at Largo" where the Watkins would encourage him to try appearing solo.

In 2012–2013 Watson began appearing in venues in and around Venice Beach, California, making appearances with the John C. Reilly band and John Prine, and opening for acts such as Punch Brothers, Sarah Jarosz, and Dawes. Initially he was performing original music, then realized he got more out of performing the old songs—and his audience seemed to enjoy them more. As he explains:

Once I was on my own, I wasn't sure what my next move was–if I was going to have another band, or try to write a bunch of songs. At first, I did start writing songs, but I don't think I was satisfied with what I was writing. I was starting to do some solo shows, and I had a few songs I'd written, and I would do a mix of those with old traditional songs, at those early shows. I was a lot happier doing those old folk songs, and I think the crowd was a lot happier, too. I thought those were great songs that people should be hearing, and that I wanted to be singing.

In 2014, he performed at SXSW in Austin, Stagecoach Music Festival in Indio, California, Newport Folk Festival in Rhode Island, Pickathon Music Festival in Oregon, Fayetteville Roots Festival in Arkansas, and Steelfest in Missouri. A tour of the United Kingdom and Ireland takes him to Bristol, Glasgow, Manchester, Sheffield, London, and Dublin.

He appears at the Americana Music Festival in Nashville during September. Of his transition to a solo career, Watson says:

I don't have any regrets, but I'm really happy that I'm where I'm at now. I'm playing the music I want to play, and it's real simple, and I don't have a big light show–I'm in a good place with that.

In 2018, Willie made his film debut as "The Kid" in the Coen brothers film The Ballad of Buster Scruggs. He also performed "When A Cowboy Trades His Spurs For Wings" on the film's soundtrack with Tim Blake Nelson – a performance that resulted in an Academy Award nomination for Best Original Song.

In 2020 Watson appeared as a guest vocalist on the song "Fly Around" by the bluegrass band Water Tower. The song is the second track on their debut album by the same name. On July 7, 2024, Watson performed with other musical acts, e.g., Joe Walsh, Ben Harper, Stephen Stills, etc. at the 84th birthday celebration for Ringo Starr in Beverly Hills, California.

== Recordings ==
=== Folk Singer Vol. 1 ===
Watson's debut solo album, Folk Singer Vol. 1, was released May 6, 2014 by Acony records. It was produced by David Rawlings, producer of Old Crow Medicine Show albums. The release features ten songs, from folk standards to "obscure gems." As Watson himself describes it,

[The album] happened naturally ... as soon as I was playing solo, I started remembering all these old tunes which led me to dig through my 78's for more. When we got in the studio, I just played everything a couple times. It reminded me of making O.C.M.S., where a lot of times we'd just play songs and let Dave sort it out.

Tour stops to promote the album release included dates at Nashville area's Music City Roots at the Loveless Café, New York City's Mercury Lounge, Philadelphia's World Café Live, and Berkeley's Freight & Salvage. Rolling Stone named the album one of The 26 Albums of 2014 You Probably Didn't But Really Should Hear, stating, "Watson's voice carries the weight of generations past, but on Folk Singer, it's still appropriate for the one we live in, right now." Rawlings, who produced the album, said: "Willie is the only one of his generation who can make me forget these songs were ever sung before."

=== Folksinger Vol. 2 ===
While at work on the second album, Watson stated: "Volume two will be a continuation of Volume one, and consist of old songs." Released September 15, 2017, Folksinger Vol. 2 was produced by David Rawlings and featured collaborations with Gillian Welch, The Fairfield Four, Morgan Jahnig of Old Crow Medicine Show, and Paul Kowert of Punch Brothers. In its review of the new album, The Guardian states nobody makes "the old songs sound fresher" than Watson, "thanks to a voice that's young but weathered, strong but eerie, and comes backed by intricate banjo and guitar picking."

==== Tracks ====
1. Samson and Delilah (w/ The Fairfield Four)
2. Gallows Pole
3. When My Baby Left Me
4. Dry Bones
5. Walking Boss
6. On the Road Again (w/ The Fairfield Four)
7. The Cuckoo Bird
8. Always Lift Him Up And Never Knock Him Down
9. John Henry
10. Leavin' Blues
11. Take This Hammer (w/ The Fairfield Four)

Watson says of "Samson and Delilah" by Reverend Gary Davis:

When you hear him play, it stops you in your tracks and makes a guy like me question every musical thing I've ever done. It's one of those songs I wouldn't have thought I could pull off, but thankfully I had the Fairfield Four to help me out.

Watson makes his first appearance on an Old Crow Medicine Show track since leaving the group on "Miles Away", lead single on Jubilee (released August 2023 through ATO Records).

==== Willie Watson (September 13, 2024) ====
Little Operation Records releases Watson's first "fully original solo album" self-titled Willie Watson on September 13, 2024. On this record, he renews "musical bonds" with Paul Kowert and Gabe Witcher of Punch Brothers, not to mention "keyboard legend" Benmont Tench. Watson released the first single, "Real Love", with a Joseph Wasilewski-directed video starring Watson himself with his wife, Mindy.

Watson owns one of the most distinctive voices in modern Americana; high and melodic, it can also be piercing, plaintive, and downright otherworldly, an echo from the time “old weird America” was amassing its treasury of song.

— The Guardian

==== Tracks ====
1. Slim and the Devil [5:12] adaptation*
2. Real Love [5:44]
3. Already Gone [4:13]
4. Sad Song [3:32]
5. One To Fall [4:03]
6. Harris and the Mare [6:10] Stan Rogers
7. Mole in the Ground [2:30] traditional
8. Play It One More Time [4:09]
9. Reap 'em in the Valley [8:35] spoken

*based on Sterling A. Brown’s poem, “Slim Greer in Hell”.

Six of the tracks are originals, co-written (largely) with Morgan Nagler. Kenneth Pattengale and Gabe Witcher produced the album with a studio band that included Dylan Day on guitar, Paul Kowert on bass, Sami Braman on fiddle, and Jason Boesel on drums.

== Films ==
Watson appeared as The Kid in the Coen brothers' The Ballad of Buster Scruggs (2018), performing in "When a Cowboy Trades His Spurs for Wings." Written by his personal friends and professional colleagues Gillian Welch and Dave Rawlings, the song came about in an interesting way, as Welch explains:

There was just a really basic conversation [with producer-director Joel Coen]. He was like, "Look, there's the singing cowboy – he's been around for a while. Now here comes the new guy. He's cuter, he's faster and he sings better. He's just better. It's the new model. He's coming for him." And, of course, it made it really special for us that onscreen, that younger, better, faster gunslinger was gonna be our dear friend Willie Watson.

Coen also said, "They have to be able to sing it together. They have to be able to sing it once [the other character] has been shot and is dead and is floating up to heaven." So it was meant to be a duet between singing cowboys, one of whom is dead.

Watson performed on "Lazy Old Moon" for another Coen film, Hail, Caesar!, from 2016. He performed in "We'll Understand It Better By and By" for the Ben Affleck film Live by Night (2016).

== Tours ==
Watson regularly tours solo and with other acts. In Summer 2016, he toured Australia with Josh Hedley for "a string of joint-headline shows throughout the east coast" of that country, including the Bello Winter Music Festival in Bellingen. The tour included stops in the major cities of Brisbane, Melbourne, and Sydney where regional "support" acts opened for them—e.g., Imogen Clark, Matt Walker, Freya Josephine Hollick, and Elwood Myre. In Fall of 2016, Watson toured with Aoife O'Donovan, "captivating" lead singer of Boston progressive string band Crooked Still—with stops in Ohio, North Carolina, and Virginia. Featured vocalist on The Goat Rodeo Sessions—a Grammy-winning album by Yo-Yo Ma, et al. – O'Donovan released her debut solo album Fossils in 2013.

Watson appeared with Old Crow Medicine Show, as an opening act and with the group, at tour stops in 2023 — including their annual New Year's Eve show at the Ryman Auditorium. He performs on "select shows" of the group's 2024 North American tour, designed to commemorate in part the 25th anniversary of Old Crow's founding. As co-founder Ketch Secor said of the reunion, "we’re just so psyched to get back together with an architect of Old Crow in this anniversary year."

Watson embarked on a 2024 tour across North America, performing as a trio with fiddler/violinist Sami Braman and original Old Crow Medicine Show bass player Ben Gould. Watson was announced "as support" on all dates of the Alison Krauss & Union Station five-month 2025 North American tour, kicking off April 25 in Atlanta and continuing through September.

In 2026, Watson rejoins his old group on the O.C.M.S. Big Iron World Tour: Back to the Roots tour to "embrace the group’s early sound, playing stripped-down versions of OCMS’s first two albums in their entirety." Watson joins The Milk Carton Kids on the North American leg of their Lost Cause Lover Fool Tour 2026 – 2027, which includes support from Paper Wings and Ron Sexsmith at select stops.

== Influences ==
Watson started with his father's record collection, which included artists like Bob Dylan and Neil Young, as well as Lead Belly. He later discovered Harry Smith's Anthology of American Folk Music – which helped trigger the folk music revival in the 1950s and 1960s.

The Ithaca-Tompkins County area played host to a number of old-time musicians, including banjo player Richie Stearns whose group The Horse Flies mixed old-time fiddle music with 1980s pop.

They had a drum set and they all plugged in, and Richie Stearns was playing clawhammer banjo. Judy Hyman played the fiddle and would dance around the stage, doing this headbang-y thing with her eyes rolling back in her head. I was about thirteen, and I would see this stuff and thought it was the coolest thing I'd ever seen. It was dance music, and it really moved me in a big way. That was my introduction to old-time music.

Nirvana's Unplugged includes a take on Lead Belly songs "In the Pines/Where Did You Sleep Last Night." Knowing his father had a Lead Belly record in the basement, Watson went and got it out. He says: "Really, that changed everything for me right there. It was all coming together at the same time." After which followed the "alternative scene", like the Pixies and They Might Be Giants.

Vocally, his first influence was Roy Orbison – when he "was, like, 9" – when Orbison had the comeback with "You Got It" and joined the Traveling Wilburys. And he was really into Neil Young, sitting up in his room singing Young songs in "that higher register." When he eventually started listening to old-time and "mountain music," he found that "singing up there, that high lonesome sound, sort of put a little more volume behind it."

All of these influences informed the style and substance he brings to traditional and old-time music. As Watson himself says of his songs:

More than two-thirds of the songs I'm doing, no one knows where those things come from. So the guys that I heard them doing were essentially borrowing and reworking it themselves, and that's the beauty of it.

== Instruments ==
Watson performs on a Larrivée guitar and Gibson five-string banjo.

== Discography ==
=== Solo ===
- Folk Singer Vol. 1 (2014)
- Folksinger Vol. 2 (2017)
- Willie Watson (2024)

=== Old Crow Medicine Show ===
- Trans:mission (1998)
- Eutaw (2001)
- Greetings From Wawa (2001)
- OCMS (2004)
- Big Iron World (2006)
- Tennessee Pusher (2008)
- Carry Me Back (2012)

=== Appearances ===
- Hello Love – The Be Good Tanyas (2006)
- A Friend of a Friend – Dave Rawlings Machine (2009)
- Out on the Open West – Frank Fairfield (2011)
- Tractor Beam – Richie Stearns* & Rosie Newton (2013)
- Nashville Obsolete – Dave Rawlings Machine (2015)
- Fly Around - Water Tower (2020)
- "Nightwind", "When It's Time" - The Crooked Moon soundtrack by The Blasting Company (2025 single, 2026 album)
