= FOCAL International =

Trade body representing the film archive industry

Federation of Commercial Audio Visual Libraries
- Abbreviation: FOCAL International
- Formation: 1985
- Legal status: Non-profit company
- Purpose: Trade association for the film archive, filmmaking and stock footage industry
- Location: 27 Mortimer Street, London, W1T 3BL
- Region served: Worldwide
- Members: Stock footage archives, industry skills and services companies
- Chair of Patrons: David Puttnam
- Patron: Greg Dyke
- Website: FOCAL International

FOCAL International is the trade association representing stock footage companies, post-production facilities and individuals involved in the use of footage, still images and audio in all forms of media production. It represents more than 300 companies and individuals involved in media production, asset management, preservation of historical archives, film restoration and post-production.

== History ==
FOCAL International was founded in 1985 by an international group of library archive leaders, specialising in film, television and news content who knew each other largely through licensing film and television archives. The high cost of Archive management, preservation and storage and the introduction of new formats was also endangering many film based collections. The founders included Jill Hawkins from BBC Enterprises (now BBC Worldwide), Pam Turner of Visnews, David Warner of ITN, George Marshall of British Pathe, Sten Frykholm from the Swedish broadcaster SVT, Jacque Blanchard, from the Canadian Broadcasting Corporation, and Patricia Gang of National Geographic. With the support of a close group of individuals from both BBC and Visnews including Alan Stoner, Jeremy Cantwell, David Wratten as well as researchers Kirsty MacCalman and Jane Mercer, FOCAL launched officially at MIPCOM in 1987.

Its first patron was David Puttnam, who became Chair of Patrons in 2005.

== Structure ==
FOCAL International is run by a small administration team in the UK, reporting to an international Executive Council, comprising a chair, and a number of representatives of member bodies.

FOCAL International seeks to implement its objectives through its committees, which are made up of industry experts and representatives. These committees include: the Editorial Committee, responsible for the quarterly magazine "Archive Zones"; the Events & Exhibitions Committee, responsible for organising the FOCAL International Awards, and FOCAL International's presence at relevant trade and industry events; the Training Committee, responsible for providing and promoting training in the archive industry, and raising awareness of the need for preservation of archives; and the Funding & Lobbying Committee, which lobbies governmental and institutional bodies on behalf of its members.

== FOCAL International Awards ==
The FOCAL International Awards were established in 2004 to support and honour the researchers, technicians and producers who uncover, preserve and utilise archive footage in their work. The award ceremony is held annually in London, UK.

The Awards cover categories for the best use of footage in factual productions, history arts & entertainment, music, sports, natural history, short format and cinema. Further categories include best restoration or preservation project, Jane Mercer Researcher of the Year, plus two additional personnel Awards for FOCAL Member Company of the Year & Footage Person of the Year. The FOCAL Executive Board also bestow the Lifetime Achievement Award.

Notable winners have included:

- Rick Prelinger: Lifetime Achievement Award, 2012
- Pathe News: Footage Library of the Year, 2012
- Britain At War:, by the Imperial War Museum Film Archives: Best Use of Footage in a Home Entertainment Release, in 2012
- Senna: Best Use of Sports Footage and Best Use of Footage in a Cinema Release, 2012
- Fire in Babylon: Best Use of Footage in a Cinema Release, 2011
- Martin Scorsese: Best Restoration or Preservation Project, 2010 (for the restoration of The Red Shoes)
- JFK: 3 Shots That Changed America: Best Use of Footage in Factual Productions, 2010
- Focus on Film, run by The National Archives: Best Use of Footage on Non-television Platforms, 2008.
- Stewart Binns: Archive Award, 2004 & 2005

== Members ==
Companies and organisations that are members of FOCAL International include:

- Agence France-Presse
- AP Archive
- BAFTA (Industry Partner)
- BAPLA (Industry Partner)
- BBC Motion Gallery
- Bridgeman Art Library
- British Pathe
- Channel 4
- Corbis
- Film Archive Forum (Industry Partner)
- Fremantlemedia Archive
- Getty Images
- Huntley Film Archives
- Imperial War Museum Film and Video Archive
- ITN Source
- The NHK Visual & Audio Archives (Japan)
- The National Archives of Singapore
- The National Film and Sound Archive (Australia)
- The National Film Board of Canada
- The National Screen and Sound Archive of Wales
- Natural History New Zealand Moving Images
- The Norwegian Broadcasting Corporation
- The Pinewood Studios Group
- The Press Association
- S4C (Wales)
- Science Photo Library
- Seven Network (Australia)
- SVT (Sweden)
- The Scottish Screen Archive at the National Library of Scotland
- T3Media
- Wellcome Library Moving Images & Sound Collection
- Yle (Finland)
