= The Americans (band) =

American band

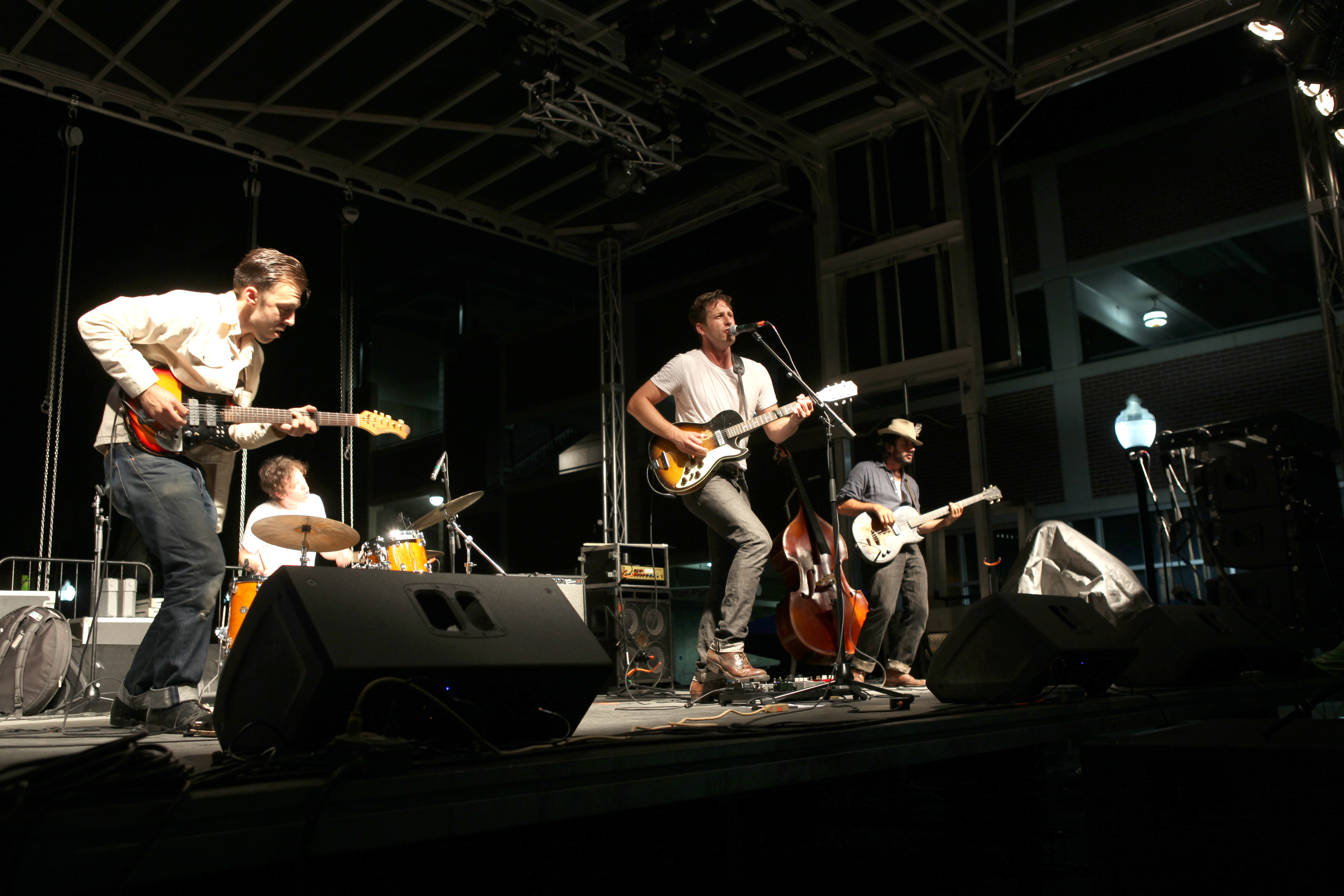
- The Americans performing in Lawrence, KS in 2016

Background information
- Origin: Los Angeles
- Genres: Rock, Americana
- Years active: 2010-present
- Label: Loose Music
- Members: Patrick Ferris; Zac Sokolow; Jake Faulkner
- Website: theamericansmusic.com

The Americans are a folk rock band from Los Angeles, California.

== History ==
The Americans formed in 2010. They appeared on The Late Show and on the TV series American Epic. Their music was featured in the films Texas Killing Fields, A Country Called Home, and Little Glory, and the TV series No Tomorrow. In 2015 they backed up Nick Cave, Lucinda Williams, and Courtney Love at the 60th anniversary celebration of Allen Ginsberg's Howl. The band's debut album, I'll Be Yours, released July 7, 2017 on Loose Music, debuted at #15 on the UK Americana Top 40 and #19 on the Indie Breaker's chart. Stand True, the band's second album, released on Loose Music on May 6, 2022, debuted at #25 on the Official Americana Albums Chart Top 40. On July 21, 2023 the band released Strays, an EP.

== Band members ==
- Patrick Ferris — vocals, guitar
- Zac Sokolow — guitar
- Jake Faulkner — bass

== Discography ==
- Strays (2023)
- Stand True (2022), Loose Music
- I'll Be Yours (2017), Loose Music
- First Recordings EP (2016)
- Son of Rogue's Gallery (2013), Anti- compilation
- Home Recordings EP (2012)
- The Americans EP (2010)
