= Jerron "Blind Boy" Paxton =

American musician from Los Angeles (born 1989)

- Born: Jerron Paxton; January 26, 1989 (age 37)
- Origin: Los Angeles, California
- Genres: Blues; jazz; ragtime; country blues; Cajun music
- Occupations: Singer, songwriter, multi-instrumentalist
- Instruments: Banjo; fiddle; piano; harmonica; Cajun accordion; ukulele; guitar; bones
- Years active: 2007–present

Jerron "Blind Boy" Paxton (born January 26, 1989) is an American musician from Los Angeles. He is a vocalist and multi-instrumentalist, drawing his style from blues and jazz music before World War II and influenced by Fats Waller and Blind Lemon Jefferson. According to Will Friedwald in The Wall Street Journal, Paxton is "virtually the only music-maker of his generation — playing guitar, banjo, piano and violin, among other implements — to fully assimilate the blues idiom of the 1920s and '30s, the blues of Bessie Smith and Lonnie Johnson."

== Background ==
Originally from the Watts district of Los Angeles, Paxton's grandparents moved from Louisiana to California in 1956. These Southern roots would have an influence on Paxton as a young boy. After spending time listening to his hometown blues radio station, as well as the old Cajun and country blues songs his grandmother used to sing, Paxton became interested in these early sounds, developing a breadth of knowledge pertaining to such music along the way. He began playing the fiddle when he was twelve, picking up the banjo two years later. He is Jewish. He graduated from Verbum Dei High School in 2007.

As a teenager, he began to go blind, losing most of his eyesight by the age of 16. As a Verbum Dei student, he had a corporate work-study assignment at the Braille Institute of America.

== Career ==
In 2007, Paxton moved to upstate New York to attend Marist College and soon after began playing gigs in and around the Brooklyn area. Although not signed to a record label, he continued to play old-time, blues, and roots festivals throughout the United States, as well as various shows opening for old-time string bands including The Dust Busters. He has been a performer in Playing for Change, on the song Sitting on the Dock of the Bay.

Paxton was named artistic director of the Port Townsend Acoustic Blues Workshop and Festival in 2014 by Centrum in Port Townsend, Washington. He succeeded musicians Daryl Davis, Corey Harris and Phil Wiggins in the role.

Living Blues placed Paxton on the cover of their issue entitled "The Next Generation of the Acoustic Blues," in December 2012.

In 2014, he voiced and sang the lines of "The Highwayman", a character from the fourth episode of Over the Garden Wall, "Songs of the Dark Lantern".

In 2017, Paxton appeared in the award-winning documentary film The American Epic Sessions, directed by Bernard MacMahon, recording Blind Gary Davis's "Candy Man" on the first electrical sound recording system from the 1920s.

== Artistry ==
Paxton's talent and contributions to acoustic blues have earned him comparisons to contemporary artists such as Taj Mahal, Keb' Mo', and Corey Harris. Similar to groups such as the Carolina Chocolate Drops, he is one of the few contemporary African-American banjo players touring today. Since his childhood, he has added piano, harmonica, Cajun accordion, ukulele, guitar, and the bones to his musical arsenal, although the banjo was his first serious instrument. In addition to blues and jazz, he uses these instruments to play ragtime, country blues, and Cajun music.

== Discography ==
=== Albums ===
- Direct-To-Disc - Volume 1 - Analogue Productions Originals - AAPO 029 (2012) - UPC:753088602917
- Direct-To-Disc - Volume 2 - Analogue Productions Originals - AAPO 030 (2012) - UPC:753088603013
- Featured on Over The Garden Wall (Original Television Soundtrack) - Cartoon Network (2014)
- Recorded Music For Your Entertainment (2015)
- Things Done Changed - Smithsonian Folkways (2024)

=== EPs ===
- Jalopy Records 7" Series: Jerron Paxton (2018)

=== Singles ===
- 2012: "Dirtiest Little Darling"/"Railroad Bill"
- 2024: "By the Lagoon" (The Crooked Moon soundtrack by The Blasting Company)
