= Anna O'Byrne =

Australian actress and soprano singer

- Occupations: Singer, actor
- Known for: Christine Daaé in The Phantom of the Opera and Love Never Dies

Anna O'Byrne (born 20 September 1987 in Melbourne, Australia) is an Australian actress and soprano singer best known for her portrayal of Christine Daaé in Andrew Lloyd Webber's The Phantom of the Opera and the original Australian production of Lloyd Webber's sequel, Love Never Dies, for which she was nominated for a Green Room Award.

O'Byrne has also portrayed Maria in West Side Story, as well as Sister Sarah Brown in Guys and Dolls. From 2016, O'Byrne has played Eliza Doolittle in the Julie Andrews-directed production of My Fair Lady for Opera Australia at the Sydney Opera House, touring in 2017 to Brisbane, Melbourne, and back to Sydney. Her performance career includes opera, theatre, concert, and film.

== Early life and education ==
Anna O'Byrne was born in Melbourne, Australia, and was educated at Elwood Primary School and St Michael's Grammar School. She played violin from the age of 5, and performed in school orchestras and sang with the Australian Girls Choir. As a 17-year-old, she won the best Junior Female Performer in the Music Theatre Guild of Victoria Awards for her role as Mrs Lovett in Sweeney Todd.

She later studied at the Victorian College of the Arts and was awarded a Bachelor of Music Performance (Honours).

== Theatre ==
Two weeks after graduating, O'Byrne was recruited to the Australasian tour of Andrew Lloyd Webber's The Phantom of the Opera, covering the role of Christine Daaé. She performed in the role opposite Anthony Warlow as the Phantom and Alexander Lewis as Raoul during 2009 in Perth and Adelaide.

She became a principal artist at Victorian Opera, singing Polly Peachum in The Threepenny Opera co-production with the Malthouse Theatre in Melbourne, and Pamina in The Magic Flute.

O'Byrne was chosen by Andrew Lloyd Webber to create the role of Christine Daaé in the new Australian production of Love Never Dies, his sequel to The Phantom of the Opera. She performed with Ben Lewis as the Phantom and Simon Gleeson as Raoul. This Simon Phillips-directed production premiered at the Regent Theatre in Melbourne on 21 May 2011 and ran until December. With Ben Lewis and cast members, She sang at Melbourne's Carols by Candlelight at the Sidney Myer Music Bowl in December 2011. Regarded as the definitive production of this musical, Love Never Dies was filmed and released in cinemas internationally by Universal Pictures. The DVD and Blu-Ray release debuted at #1 on the international music charts, and #4 on the overall charts. Love Never Dies subsequently transferred to the Capitol Theatre in Sydney in 2012. O'Byrne was nominated for Sydney Theatre and Green Room awards for her portrayal of Christine.

In April, she joined Ruthie Henshall and others in Side By Side By Sondheim, a musical revue showcasing the work of composer Stephen Sondheim performed at the Theatre Royal, Sydney.

Following Love Never Dies, O'Byrne made her West End debut on 3 September 2012 as Christine Daaé in The Phantom of the Opera opposite Marcus Lovett in the flagship production of the show at Her Majesty's Theatre, London.

In 2013, she played Anne Egerman in Alex Parker's production of A Little Night Music with Janie Dee and Joanna Riding at the Yvonne Arnaud Theatre at Guildford. She then created the role of Jenny Lind in Cameron Mackintosh's Barnum at the Chichester Festival Theatre. The rehearsal process was featured in the documentary The Sound of Musicals on Channel 4. Anna then returned to the West End in Robert Allan Ackerman's Strangers on a Train at the Gielgud Theatre.

She was invited to sing Andrew Lloyd Webber's Pie Jesu at Westminster Abbey at the Memorial Service for Sir David Frost on 13 March 2014. The service was attended by Prince Charles, the Duchess of Cornwall and other dignitaries. A month later, she was the first actress to perform in Russia as Christine Daaé in The Phantom of the Opera, in a special performance with John Owen-Jones as The Phantom, broadcast nationally from the Bolshoi Theatre as part of the Golden Mask Awards.

In January 2015, she reprised the role of Anne Egerman in Alex Parker's production of A Little Night Music with Janie Dee and Joanna Riding at the Palace Theatre as part of the show's 40th anniversary celebrations. She then debuted with English National Opera in their production of Sweeney Todd, starring Bryn Terfel and Emma Thompson. Returning to her hometown Melbourne, Australia in July 2015, she performed the role of Maria in a sell-out season of West Side Story at the State Theatre for The Production Company. For this performance, she was nominated for a Green Room Award for Best Female Actor in a Leading Role.

Later that year in Sydney, she appeared with David Campbell in the Hayes Theatre's An Evening With… cabaret, alongside Judi Connelli, John Diedrich, Amy Lehpamer, James Millar and Alex Rathgeber. In November 2015 she returned to the West End in Alex Parker's Kings of Broadway at the Palace Theatre.

She joined the UK tour of Guys and Dolls playing Sarah Brown opposite Louise Dearman and Richard Fleeshman from March to July 2016.

Returning to Australia, she was chosen by director Dame Julie Andrews to play the iconic role of Eliza Doolittle in the 60th anniversary My Fair Lady Opera Australia/Gordon Frost co-production at the Sydney Opera House. The show opened in September 2016 and ran until November, breaking the box office record for the Sydney Opera House, with more tickets sold than any other production in the Opera House's 43 years. My Fair Lady also featured Alex Jennings as Henry Higgins, Robyn Nevin as Mrs Higgins and Reg Livermore as Alfred P. Doolittle. For this performance, Anna won the Colleen Clifford Memorial Award in the Glugs Theatrical Awards, and was also nominated for the Sydney Theatre Judith Johnson Award for Best Performance by an Actress in a musical.

O'Byrne returned to London for concerts in December 2016 and January 2017.

Anna continued with My Fair Lady to Queensland Performing Arts Centre in Brisbane in March, with Charles Edwards as Henry Higgins, and at the Regent Theatre in Melbourne from 16 May to July 2017. A return Sydney season for My Fair Lad] followed from August to October 2017 at the Capitol Theatre. For her performance as Eliza Doolittle, she won a Helpmann Award for Best Female Actor in a Musical on 24 July 2017. She was also nominated for a Green Room Award.

She returned to the London stage from November 2017 to February 2018 as Laura Fairlie in Andrew Lloyd Webber's The Woman in White at the Charing Cross Theatre.

She joined Ramin Karimloo's Australasian tour in May and June 2018, as well as appearing as Laurey Williams in The Production Company's Oklahoma! alongside Simon Gleeson, Elise McCann and Bobby Fox in Melbourne. Back in London, she appeared in a workshop version of Unmasked, a not-so-reverent musical retrospective celebrating Andrew Lloyd-Webber's 70th birthday.

In 2022, O'Byrne premiered her first solo show, Becoming Eliza, at Sydney Opera House. The concert evening explores her time in My Fair Lady and features songs from Julie Andrews' movies and musicals.

Later that year, she played Mollie Ralston in the 70th anniversary Australian tour of The Mousetrap, directed by Robyn Nevin. The Mousetrap premiered at the Theatre Royal, Sydney, travelling in 2023 to Adelaide, Melbourne, Perth, Canberra, and Brisbane before returning to Sydney.

Early in 2023, O'Byrne sang with John Owen-Jones in The Voices of the West End, a series of concerts at the Bunkamura Concert Hall in Tokyo, Japan.

== Film ==
- Love Never Dies (2011) playing the role of Christine Daaé; by Andrew Lloyd Webber and Universal Pictures.

== Recordings ==
- Dream (2016); album by Anna O'Byrne, Musical Director Guy Simpson, Producer Alex Parker.

== Theatre credits ==
| Year | Production | Role | Notes |
|---|---|---|---|
| 2009 | The Phantom of the Opera | u/s Christine Daaé | Australia tour |
| 2010 | The Threepenny Opera | Polly Peachum | Malthouse Theatre |
| 2011-2012 | Love Never Dies | Christine Daaé | Original Australian production |
| 2012 | The Phantom of the Opera | Christine Daaé (alternate) | West End |
| 2013 | A Little Night Music | Anne Egerman | Yvonne Arnaud Theatre |
| 2013 | Barnum | Jenny Lind | Chichester Festival Theatre |
| 2013 | Strangers on a Train | Company | West End |
| 2015 | A Little Night Music | Anne Egerman | West End |
| 2015 | Sweeney Todd: The Demon Barber of Fleet Street | Ensemble | English National Opera, West End |
| 2015 | West Side Story | Maria | State Theatre |
| 2016 | Guys and Dolls | Sarah Brown | UK tour |
| 2016 | My Fair Lady | Eliza Doolittle | Sydney Opera House |
| 2017 | My Fair Lady | Eliza Doolittle | Queensland Performing Arts Centre |
| 2017 | My Fair Lady | Eliza Doolittle | Regent Theatre |
| 2017 | Candide | Cunegonde | Cadogan Hall |
| 2017 | My Fair Lady | Eliza Doolittle | Capitol Theatre |
| 2017-2018 | The Woman in White | Laura Fairlie | Charing Cross Theatre |
| 2018 | The Phantom of the Opera | Christine Daaé | Sejong Center |
| 2018 | Oklahoma! | Laurey Williams | The Production Company |
| 2022 | The Mousetrap | Mollie Ralston | Australia tour |
| 2024 | Carousel | Julie Jordan | State Theatre & Princess Theatre |

== Awards and nominations ==
| Year | Award | Category | Production | Role | Result |
|---|---|---|---|---|---|
| 2011 | Green Room Awards | Best Female Actor in a Leading Role (Music Theatre) | Love Never Dies | Christine Daaé | Nominated |
| 2012 | Sydney Theatre Awards | Judith Johnson Award for Best Performance by an Actress in a Musical | Love Never Dies | Christine Daaé | Nominated |
| 2015 | Green Room Awards | Best Female Actor in a Leading Role (Music Theatre) | West Side Story | Maria | Nominated |
| 2016 | Sydney Theatre Awards | Judith Johnson Award for Best Performance by an Actress in a Musical | My Fair Lady | Eliza Doolittle | Nominated |
| 2016 | Glugs Theatrical Awards | Colleen Clifford Memorial Award for the most Outstanding Performance by an Actress in a Musical | My Fair Lady | Eliza Doolittle | Won |
| 2017 | Helpmann Awards | Best Female Actor in a Musical | My Fair Lady | Eliza Doolittle | Won |
| 2017 | Green Room Awards | Best Female Actor in a Leading Role (Music Theatre) | My Fair Lady | Eliza Doolittle | Nominated |
