= Courtney Stapleton =

British actress, singer, dancer and photographer

Courtney Jane Stapleton
- Born: August 27, 1993 (age 32)
- Occupations: Actress; singer; dancer; photographer
- Years active: 2015–present

Courtney Jane Stapleton (born 27 August 1993) is a British actress, singer, dancer and photographer. She is best known for playing Belle in Disney's Beauty and the Beast stage musical in 2022.

== Early life and education ==
Stapleton attended Cornwallis Academy and joined the local Hazlitt Youth Theatre. She went on to train at the Arts Educational School (ArtsEd), graduating in 2014.

== Career ==
Stapleton made her West End debut in the cast of Mamma Mia in 2015, covering the role of Ali, as well as being part of the ensemble for the show.

She joined the ensemble of Bat Out of Hell in 2017 with the show touring the UK and returning to London twice, at the Coliseum (2017) and the Dominion Theatre (2018).

In October 2019 she moved to the cast of Dear Evan Hansen, premiering in the UK with Sam Tutty making his West End debut in the title role.

Stapleton was announced to have been cast as Belle in the revival of Disney's Beauty and the Beast in 2022. Fellow cast members for this production were Gavin Lee as Lumiere, Sam Bailey as Mrs Potts. The production started as a UK and Ireland tour, subsequently moving to the London Palladium for the 2022 summer season. This version of the show featured new designs and new dance arrangements, including a tap dance moment during "Be Our Guest", specifically created for Gavin Lee.

In June 2023 it was announced that Stapleton will join the cast of the summer concert staging of Love Never Dies as Meg Giry. The version of the musical will be held at the Theatre Royal, Drury Lane and will star Norm Lewis as Phantom and Celinde Schoenmaker as Christine.

== Theatre credits ==
| Year | Title | Role | Theatre |
|---|---|---|---|
| 2015 | Mamma Mia | Ensemble/ Cover Ali | Novello Theatre |
| 2016 | Les Miserables | Ensemble/ Cover Eponine | Queen's Theatre |
| 2017 - 2018 | Bat Out of Hell | Ensemble/ Dance Captain / cover Goddesilla | West End and International Tour |
| 2019 | Six | Swing (Parr and Seymour) | Arts Theatre |
| 2019 | Dear Evan Hansen | Standby Zoe Murphy and Alana Beck | Noël Coward Theatre |
| 2020 | The Throwaways | Audrey | The Other Palace |
| 2022 | Beauty and the Beast | Belle | UK Tour and London Palladium |
| 2023 | Love Never Dies in concert | Meg Giry | Theatre Royal, Drury Lane |
| 2024 | Avalon First Look Concert | Morgan Le Fay | Phoenix Arts Club |
| 2025 | The Mad Ones | Kelly Manning | The Other Palace |

== Awards and nominations ==
| Year | Work | Award | Category | Result |
|---|---|---|---|---|
| 2022 | Beauty and the Beast | Black British Theatre Awards | LGBTQIA Champion Award | Nominated |
| 2022 | Beauty and the Beast | Black British Theatre Awards | Best Female Actor in a Musical | Won |
| 2022 | Beauty and the Beast | BroadwayWorld UK / West End Awards | Best Leading Performer in a New Production of a Musical | Nominated |
