= Rachel Moore =

Rachel Moore may refer to:

- Rachel Moore (writer) (born 1932), pseudonym used by Jean Saunders
- Rachel Moore (arts administrator), Los Angeles administrator and CEO
- Rachel Anne Moore, American theatre actress and opera singer
- Rachel Moore (Case Closed), character of the anime and manga Case Closed, known in Japan as Detective Conan
- Rachel Dolezal (born 1977), previously known as Rachel Moore, former college instructor and former NAACP chapter president
