= 'Til I Hear You Sing =

Song from Love Never Dies

Single by Ramin Karimloo

from the album Love Never Dies
- Released: March 8, 2010
- Genre: Musical theatre
- Length: 4:19
- Label: Really Useful
- Composer: Andrew Lloyd Webber
- Lyricist: Glenn Slater
- Producers: Andrew Lloyd Webber, Nigel Wright

"'Til I Hear You Sing" is a song from the musical Love Never Dies, the 2010 sequel to the 1986 musical The Phantom of the Opera. It was originally performed by Ramin Karimloo as the Phantom during the London run and was recorded with him for the original London cast album. Ben Lewis performed the song in the Australian production and its 2012 live stage film and 2018 cast album.

== Synopsis ==
The Phantom sings about how he has done next to nothing in the ten years since the events of the first musical took place. He now feels like he cannot be productive in any way until he hears Christine sing again. The Telegraph explains "the tortured hero longs to be reunited with his muse, Christine, with whom, the show reveals, he once shared a night of passion." He will never be happy until he hears Christine sing again.

As a result of some structural changes Andrew Lloyd Webber made to the show due to mixed reviews, it "comes at the very start of the show".

== Critical reception ==
StageWhispers described it as a "vocally demanding opening prologue". AllMusic described this song, along with the title song, as "crafty/schmaltzy ballads". Gramophone wrote "Karimloo's Phantom seethes magnificently in his opening ballad 'Til I Hear You Sing". The BBC deemed it "the musical's most memorable song", and described Karimloo's performance as "full-blooded". Ckickey described it as " a genuinely stirring show-stopper", "prodigious", "pulsating", and a "great song". The Telegraph named it "one of the show's finest songs". The Stage deemed the number, along with Love Never Dies, as "stand outs". Reviewing the Australian version of the musical, The Herald Sun wrote the Phantom's "opening rendition of 'Til I Hear You Sing is thrilling and no song that follows meets this level." London Theatreland wrote "I did not leave the theatre humming 'Till I Hear You Sing'. But will people be humming 'Till I Hear You Sing' in months, years to come? Of course, they will." Gramaphone says the Phantom "seethes magnificently in his opening ballad ". Entertainment Weekly said "Instead of Music of the Night, we get a piercing succession of key changes through 'Til I Hear You Sing as [Erik] longs for Christine to be restored as his muse", concluding "his musical mastery has...largely deserted him". News.com deemed it "the show's strongest number...which remains the standout performance of the night until...the title song."
