= Celia Graham =

British actress (born 1976)

- Born: Celia Graham; 1976 (age 49–50); Glasgow
- Occupations: Actress, Singer/Songwriter
- Years active: 1987 - present

Celia Graham (born in 1976) is a Scottish musical theatre actress. She began her career at the age of 11 performing in Scottish Opera's Street Scene by Kurt Weill, at the Theatre Royal in Glasgow.

She is mostly known for playing Christine Daaé in The Phantom of the Opera in 2008 with John Owen-Jones and she took over the role from Sierra Boggess in Love Never Dies in 2011 in London's West End. Celia Graham has done recording for films and television programmes. Celia Graham was the last Christine Daaé in Love Never Dies.

She has done recording for Easy Virtue and Johnny English Reborn and Young Victoria.

As part of the celebrations in honour of the centenary of the Entente Cordiale, Celia Graham took part in a performance of Les Misérables at Windsor Castle with Ramin Karimloo and Michael Ball in the presence of Queen Elizabeth II and French President Jacques Chirac.

Celia has toured England with Ramin Karimloo where they stopped at main cities such as Southampton and Birmingham where they sang songs from Les Misérables, The Phantom of the Opera, Miss Saigon, South Pacific and Love Never Dies where it ended at the Southampton Mayflower Theatre.

Celia recently toured the U.K. And Europe playing Jellylorum in "Cats".
