= Rachel Anne Moore =

American theater actress and opera singer (born 1985)

- Born: March 3, 1985 (age 41); Seattle, Washington
- Education: Indiana University Bloomington; University of Tennessee
- Occupations: Singer; actress
- Website: http://rachelannemoore.com/

Rachel Anne Moore is an American theatre actress and opera singer. She is best known for her roles as the Christine Daaé in the North American premiere tour and in the Hamburg production of Love Never Dies.

== Education and career ==
Rachel Anne Moore was born on March 3, 1985, in Seattle, Washington. She studied opera at Jacobs School of Music at Indiana University Bloomington and received the 2008/2009 Spivey Humanities Fellowship to pursue her master's degree in Opera Performance from University of Tennessee. While in Tennessee, Moore played as Mabel in Pirates of Penzance, Donna Anna in Don Giovanni, Abigail Williams in The Crucible, and more.

Three years after she graduated, Moore came to Hamburg, Germany to perform as Carlotta Giudicelli in The Phantom of the Opera. After her run as Carlotta, she premiered Christine Daaé in Love Never Dies in the same city. In 2017, Moore returned to the states to join the first national U.S. tour cast of Love Never Dies as the Christine Daaé alternate to Meghan Picerno. Following her run as Christine, Moore made her Broadway debut in The Phantom of the Oper as both the Spanish Lady and a Carlotta Giudicelli understudy.

Following the COVID-19 Broadway shutdown, Moore and her husband opened their own voice studio, Moore Than Music, and offer virtual private voice lessons.

== Performance credits ==
Year(s)	Production	Role	Location	Category
2012-2014	The Phantom of the Opera	Carlotta Giudicelli		Hamburg
2015	Love Never Dies	Christine Daaé	Stage Operettenhaus	Hamburg
2017-2018	Love Never Dies	Christine Daaé		US Tour
2019	The Phantom of the Opera	Spanish Lady	Majestic Theatre	Broadway
