= Madame Giry =

- The Phantom of the Opera character
- Giry as portrayed by Miranda Richardson in the 2004 film adaptation.
- First appearance: The Phantom of the Opera
- Created by: Gaston Leroux
- Portrayed by: Miranda Richardson; Liz Robertson; Maria Mercedes; Mary Millar; Sally Dexter; Rebecca Spencer

In-universe information
- Gender: Female
- Occupation: Concierge
- Children: Meg Giry (daughter)
- Nationality: French

Madame Giry is a fictional character from Gaston Leroux's 1910 novel The Phantom of the Opera. She is a fairly intermediate character in the novel, although her role is much increased in Andrew Lloyd Webber's 1986 musical. Madame Giry is also a character in the 2010 musical Love Never Dies, a sequel to The Phantom of the Opera.

== Madame Giry in the Phantom of the Opera novel ==
Madame Giry is an aging woman who works as a concierge in the rue de Provence, who looks after patrons of the Opera, principally those who sit in the boxes.

One night, whilst working, Madame Giry hears a male voice in Box Five, which she knows to be empty. After recovering from her surprise, she learns to trust the "voice" and does odd jobs for the owner.

In the novel, it is never mentioned that she knows Christine Daaé.

One of her little tasks is to collect the monthly "salary" of 20,000 francs owed to the "Opera Ghost." The Ghost instructs the managers of the Opera to hand Madame Giry a sealed envelope containing the money. The Ghost has provided her with a duplicate that contains play money; she knows nothing of the contents of either envelope. Placing the duplicate in Box Five, she slips the real one into the back pocket of a manager's dress-coat while he is wearing it. Once the managers have returned to their office, the Ghost steals the money from this pocket with the help of a trapdoor built into the floor.

The managers, Firmin Richard and Armand Moncharmin, remove Madame Giry from her post, finding her troublesome. There is an indication that they consider her to be the Ghost, but since the Ghost remains in the Opera Garnier after Madame Giry is removed, this is clearly an erroneous suggestion. As they search for a replacement concierge, they invite one candidate to sit in the audience for a performance. The chandelier falls that night, killing the candidate. Following direct intervention by the Opera Ghost, Madame Giry is eventually reinstated into her role as concierge.

During a meeting with the managers, she explains that she once found a note in Box Five, written by the Ghost and listing a number of dancers and singers who married into royalty and the nobility, with her daughter Meg included as eventually becoming an empress. This note was enough to persuade Madame Giry to help the Ghost; later in life, Meg did become the Baroness de Castelot-Barbezac.

== Madame Giry in the 1986 The Phantom of the Opera musical ==
In Andrew Lloyd Webber's The Phantom of the Opera, Madame Giry's role is changed to become a slightly younger woman who now works as a choreographer of the corps de ballet. She is shown holding a cane, which she uses to beat time with the music, but which she is rarely shown to use otherwise.

When the Opera Diva, Carlotta Giudicelli, walks out during rehearsals at the start of the show, it is Madame Giry, and her daughter, Meg, who suggest Christine Daaé for the leading role. Later in the show, she delivers one of the Phantom's "Notes" to the managers in both reprises of this tune. She gives the first one to M. Firmin and reads the second one herself; in both cases, the Phantom's voice replaces that of the reader partway through.

While there is very little history given between the Phantom and Madame Giry in the musical, a small scene was extended in the film version, showing a young Madame Giry rescuing the Phantom from a traveling circus and hiding him in the Opera House. This was taken from Frederick Forsyth's sequel, The Phantom of Manhattan. Even in the extended scene she does not give any indication why she is working for the Phantom (other than sympathy and her appreciation for his genius), unlike the reasons given in the novel.

In the 2004 film version of the musical (in which she is played by Miranda Richardson), Madame Giry is shown almost to be an accomplice of the Phantom, failing to notify people when he locks Christine's dressing room (though she could have alerted someone, but they likely did not listen) or when she spots him in the rafters during a scene. This collusion does not appear in the stage musical.

Regularly during the musical, Madame Giry tries to stop the Managers from doing any harm to the Phantom and defends him on several occasions. However, when Christine is abducted by the Phantom, Madame Giry gives up all hope of avoiding her past and helps Raoul de Chagny to the Phantom's Lair deep underground. She shows him the way, but will not accompany him into the catacombs. In this way, Andrew Lloyd Webber combines the roles of Madame Giry and the Persian from the novel. (In the novel, the Persian shows Raoul where the Opera Ghost resides - although he does accompany Raoul, unlike Madame Giry.) They both tell Raoul to hold his hand "at the level of his eyes", to protect from an attack with the punjab lasso.

Madame Giry is not amongst the crowd who enter the Phantom's Lair at the end of the musical, although her daughter Meg Giry is. In the film version, Richardson is seen playing a non-speaking character in several of the black-and-white scenes, which indicate events many years after the events in the story. Since Raoul uses a wheelchair in these scenes, it is wrongly assumed that she is meant to be an elder Meg, as opposed to Madame Giry.
