= The West End Whingers =

London-based theatre blog

The West End Whingers was a London-based theatre blog which published humorous and satirical reviews of mostly West End theatre productions.

The blog was founded in June 2006 by a pair of London bloggers identified only as "Phil" and "Andrew" - in fact Philip Argent and Andrew Rogers - who were inspired to begin the blog after seeing a production of Sam Shepard's Fool for Love starring Juliette Lewis.

Their reviews exhibit many of the characteristics of gonzo journalism, differing from conventional reviews in their heavy focus on subjective responses, openly held artistic prejudices and a willingness to discuss aspects of the theatregoing experience beyond the merits of the show being evaluated. Capable of both savage criticism and fulsome praise, their reviews are tempered by a self-deprecating humour. They often reviewed shows which were still in preview and had not yet had their official press night.

A survey into preferred sources of critical opinion by the industry paper The Stage on 6 May 2010 found the West End Whingers to be "the most popular online choice by some distance".

The blog received global attention in March 2010 when its review of the Andrew Lloyd Webber musical Love Never Dies re-dubbed the show "Paint Never Dries".

In December 2010 the West End Whingers were listed at number 50 of The Times newspaper's "luvvie power list 2010: theatre’s 50 most influential people" saying "We wouldn’t normally list bloggers, but this duo brought the blogosphere into repute with their “Paint Never Dries” tag for Lloyd Webber’s Love Never Dies."

Since 2012 the duo's output diminished, and the blog now states that "Andrew is on sabbatical but Phil is soldiering on to help you decide between the Merlot and the Marlowe and generally putting London's West End theatre to rights".
