= Mary Michael Patterson =

American musical theater actress

- Born: Aledo, Texas
- Education: University of Michigan (BFA)
- Occupations: Actress; singer

Mary Michael Patterson is an American theater actress and singer. She was raised in Aledo, Texas, a suburb west of Fort Worth. She graduated from the University of Michigan with a BFA in Musical Theater. She is married to Broadway dancer Cary Tedder.

Patterson started her professional career performing in regional theater. She made her Broadway debut in the 2011 revival of Anything Goes as the understudy for Hope. Two years later, she joined the Broadway company of The Phantom of the Opera as the alternate Christine Daaé and later become the principal in September 2014 when Sierra Boggess departed the show. Patterson joined the US touring company as Meg Giry in Love Never Dies, which ran from September, 2017 to December, 2018.

== Performance credits ==
Year(s)	Production	Role	Location	Category
2011-2012	Anything Goes	Passenger, Hope Harcout u/s	Stephen Sondheim Theatre	Broadway
2012	The Sound of Music	Liesl Von Trapp	Carnegie Hall	Concert
2012	Singin' in the Rain	Kathy Selden	Century II Concert Hall	Regional
2013	Sense & Sensibility: The Musical	Marianne Dashwood	The Stage Theatre	World Premiere
2013-2014	The Phantom of the Opera	Christine Daaé	Majestic Theatre	Broadway
2014	Singin' in the Rain	Kathy Selden	Benedum Center for the Performing Arts	Regional
2015	Luck Be A Lady	Woman #3	The Mertz Theatre	World Premiere
2015	Les Misérables	Cosette	Casa Mañana Theatre	Regional
2016	Singin' in the Rain	Kathy Selden	Marriott Theatre	Regional
2017–2018	Love Never Dies	Meg Giry		US Tour
