= Love Never Dies (musical) =

2010 musical by Andrew Lloyd Webber

- The Phantom Returns
- Music: Andrew Lloyd Webber
- Lyrics: Glenn Slater; Additional lyrics: Charles Hart
- Book: Andrew Lloyd Webber; Ben Elton; Frederick Forsyth; Glenn Slater
- Basis: The Phantom of Manhattan by Frederick Forsyth; Characters by Gaston Leroux
- Productions: 2010 West End; 2011 Melbourne; 2012 Copenhagen; 2013 Vienna; 2014 Tokyo; 2015 Hamburg; 2017 U.S. Tour; 2019 Tokyo; 2023 West End Concert; 2023 China Tour; 2026 London Palladium Concert

Love Never Dies is a musical with music by Andrew Lloyd Webber, lyrics by Glenn Slater, and a book by Lloyd Webber, Ben Elton, Frederick Forsyth, and Slater. It is a sequel to the long-running 1986 musical The Phantom of the Opera and was loosely adapted from Forsyth's 1999 novel The Phantom of Manhattan.

The plot is not based on the storyline in the original 1910 novel by Gaston Leroux. Lloyd Webber stated, "I don't regard this as a sequel—it's a stand-alone piece." He later clarified, "Clearly, it is a sequel, but I really do not believe that you have to have seen Phantom of the Opera to understand Love Never Dies." Glenn Slater subsequently explained that Lloyd Webber "didn't view it as a sequel as much as 'a second story with these characters'". The musical is set in 1907, which Lloyd Webber states is "ten years roughly after the end of the original Phantom", although the events of the original actually took place in 1881.

In the show, Christine Daaé is invited by Oscar Hammerstein I for her American debut, until an anonymous impresario under the pseudonym of Mr. Y contracts her to perform at Phantasma, a new attraction on Coney Island. With her husband Raoul and son Gustave in tow, she journeys to Brooklyn, apparently unaware it is actually the Phantom who has arranged her appearance in the popular beach resort.

Although Lloyd Webber began working on Love Never Dies in 1990, it was not until 2007 that he began writing the music. The show opened at the Adelphi Theatre in London's West End on 9 March 2010, with previews from 22 February 2010. It was originally directed by Jack O'Brien and choreographed by Jerry Mitchell, starring Ramin Karimloo and Sierra Boggess. However, the show closed for four days in November 2010 for substantial re-writes, which were overseen by Lloyd Webber, and it re-opened with new direction from Bill Kenwright. Set and costume designs were by Bob Crowley. The original London production received mostly negative reviews. A subsequent Australian production starring Ben Lewis and Anna O'Byrne, featuring an entirely new design team and heavy revisions was generally better received, although the show finally closed with heavy discounting to tickets. A planned Broadway production, which was to have opened simultaneously with the West End run, was cancelled, the amount of negative press having deterred potential backers. In 2023, the revised Australian version of the show made its West End premiere in a concert run starring Norm Lewis and Celinde Schoenmaker.

== Background ==
I really do not believe that you have to have seen Phantom of the Opera to understand Love Never Dies. I really don’t. But I hope if you see them together, if you wanted to see them back-to-back, that what you would get from them – from both of them – is the extension of where the story goes.

— Andrew Lloyd Webber

Andrew Lloyd Webber first began plans for a sequel to his 1986 hit musical, The Phantom of the Opera, in 1990. Following a conversation with Maria Björnson, the designer of The Phantom of the Opera, Lloyd Webber decided that, were a sequel to come about, it would be set in New York City at the turn of the 20th century. One of his ideas was to have the Phantom live above ground in Manhattan's first penthouse, but he rejected this when he saw a TV documentary about the Coney Island fairground. Lloyd Webber began collaborating with author Frederick Forsyth on the project, but it soon fell apart as Lloyd Webber felt the ideas they were developing would be difficult to adapt for a stage musical. For Lloyd Webber's 50th birthday concert in 1998, Kiri Te Kanawa performed the song The Heart Is Slow To Learn, which was written for the Forsyth version of the musical. The song would be reworked into the titular song Love Never Dies. Forsyth went on to publish some of the ideas he had worked on with Lloyd Webber in 1999 as a novel entitled The Phantom of Manhattan.

Lloyd Webber returned to the project in 2006, collaborating with a number of writers and directors. However, he still did not feel the ideas he had were adaptable into a piece of musical theatre. Finally, in early 2007, Lloyd Webber approached Ben Elton (who had served as the librettist for Lloyd Webber's The Beautiful Game) to help shape a synopsis for a sequel, based on Lloyd Webber's initial ideas. Elton's treatment of the story focused more on the original characters of The Phantom of the Opera and omitted new characters that Lloyd Webber and Forsyth had developed. Lloyd Webber was pleased with Elton's treatment and began work on the sequel. In March 2007, he announced he would be moving forward with the project. When Lloyd Webber approached the lyricist Glenn Slater to join the project, Slater's initial thought was that "it just sounded like a terrible idea".

The sequel was delayed because Lloyd Webber's six-month-old kitten Otto, a rare-breed Turkish Van, climbed onto Lloyd Webber's Clavinova digital piano and managed to delete the entire score. Lloyd Webber was unable to recover any of it from the instrument, but was eventually able to reconstruct the score. In 2008, Lloyd Webber first announced that the sequel would likely be called Phantom: Once Upon Another Time, and the first act was performed at his annual Sydmonton Festival. The Phantom was played by Ramin Karimloo and Raoul was played by Alistair Robbins. However, in September 2008, during the BBC's Birthday in the Park concert celebrating his 60th birthday, Lloyd Webber announced that the title would be Love Never Dies. In other workshop readings, Raoul and Christine were played by Aaron Lazar and Elena Shaddow.

On 3 July 2009, Lloyd Webber announced that Karimloo (who had played the Phantom in the West End) and Sierra Boggess (who had originated the role of Christine in Phantom – The Las Vegas Spectacular) had been cast as the Phantom and Christine and that the role of Meg Giry would be played by Summer Strallen, Madame Giry by Liz Robertson, and Raoul by Joseph Millson. I'd Do Anything finalist Niamh Perry was given the role of Fleck.

Lloyd Webber originally intended for Love Never Dies to open simultaneously in London, New York, and Shanghai in the autumn of 2009. By March 2009, he had decided to open the show at London's Adelphi Theatre, followed by Toronto's Royal Alexandra Theatre (before transferring to Broadway's Neil Simon Theatre in 2010) and Shanghai. The three casts would rehearse simultaneously in London for three months beginning August 2009. Opening dates were soon announced as 26 October 2009 in London, November in Toronto and February 2010 in Shanghai, with a later transfer to Melbourne, Australia. Plans were then announced for a separate Broadway production to run concurrently with the Toronto show if Toronto proved successful. In May, the debut of the London production was delayed until March 2010 due to Lloyd Webber re-orchestrating the score and re-recording the album. Technical issues with special effects and an automaton version of Christine, and the casting of multiple simultaneous productions also contributed to the postponement. By October 2009, Shanghai plans had been dropped in favour of an Australian production.

On 8 October 2009, Lloyd Webber held a press conference at Her Majesty's Theatre, where the original Phantom has been running since 1986, confirming the casting of Boggess as Christine and Karimloo as the Phantom. Karimloo sang "Til I Hear You Sing" and the instrumental "The Coney Island Waltz" was performed by an orchestra for the journalists, industry insiders, and fans who had assembled for the presentation. Lloyd Webber announced that Love Never Dies would begin previews in London on 20 February 2010 and anticipated that the Broadway production would open on 11 November 2010 (this was later postponed and then indefinitely and to date has not come to fruition). Rehearsals began in January 2010.

== Score ==
Instead of the operatic passages for fictional "operas", the "stage" music at Phantasma is based on the companion pieces to the Savoy Operas, which were often burlesques and were also sometimes performed at the Opéra Comique. Many of these kinds of burlesques were based on existing French operas. During the Victorian age, nearly every popular opera was turned into a burlesque.

== Productions ==
=== West End (2010–2011) ===
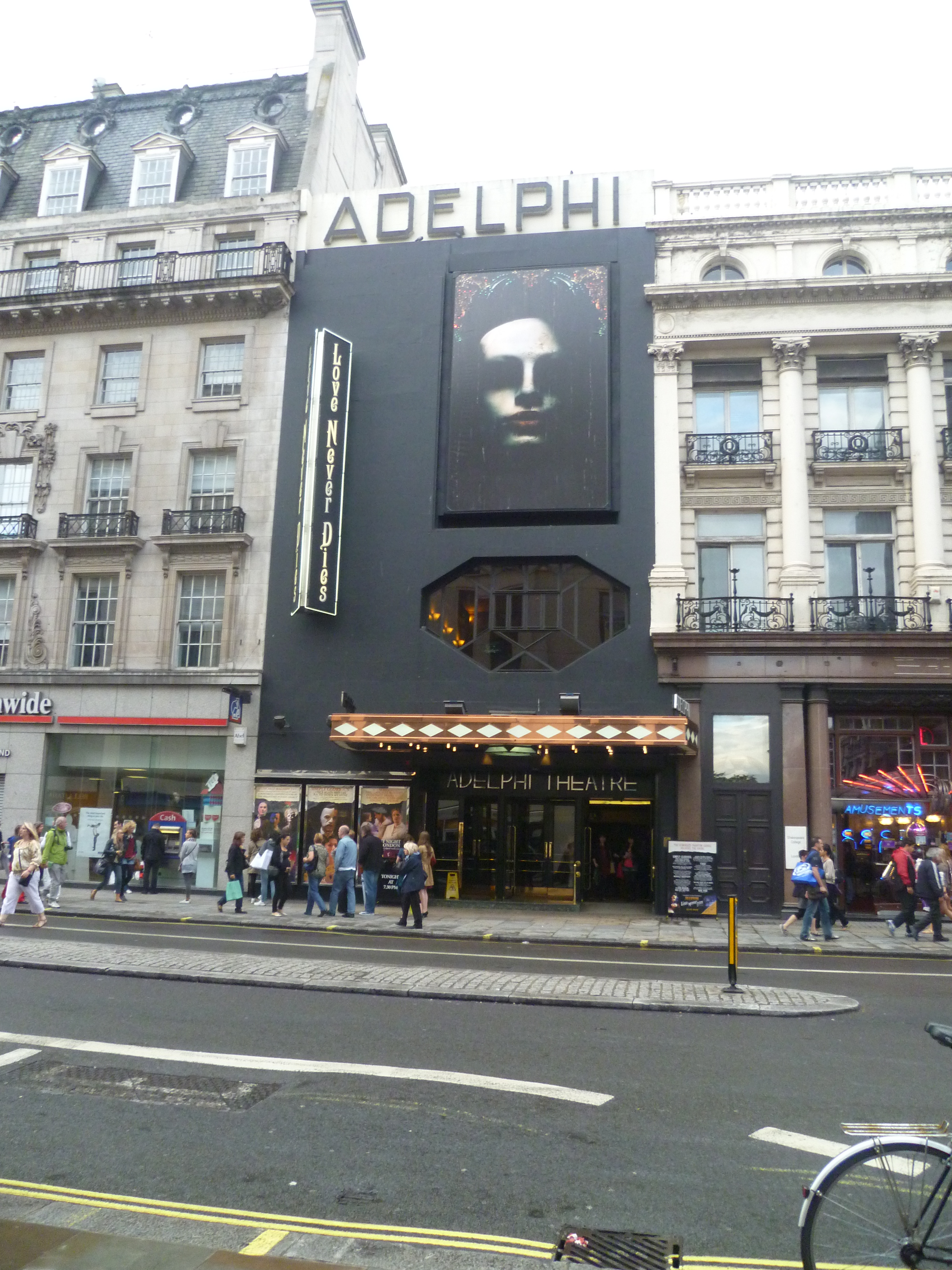
At The Adelphi Theatre

The first preview of Love Never Dies was delayed from 20 to 22 February 2010 due to a last-minute brief illness of Boggess and technical demands. The show had its official opening on 9 March 2010. It was directed by Jack O'Brien and choreographed by Jerry Mitchell, with set and costume designs by Bob Crowley. The cast included Ramin Karimloo as the Phantom, Sierra Boggess as Christine, Joseph Millson as Raoul, Liz Robertson as Madame Giry, Summer Strallen as Meg Giry, and Niamh Perry as Fleck. In April 2010, Lloyd Webber was threatened with a £20,000 fine for illegally painting the Grade II-listed Adelphi Theatre black to promote the show.

In November 2010, Lloyd Webber closed the London production for a few days to rework the show after a poor critical response. The musical was reviewed again (at Lloyd Webber's invitation), with critic Henry Hitchings noting that "Some of the most obvious alterations stem from the recruitment of lyricist Charles Hart to adjust the cadences of the original clunky lines written by Glenn Slater." He further pointed out that "There are also lots of bracing directorial touches; the show is credited to Jack O’Brien, but it is new choreographer Bill Deamer and producer Bill Kenwright who have added the zest." The London production closed on 27 August 2011 after a disappointing run of fewer than eighteen months. In 2012, Lloyd Webber stated that although he was, "very, very proud" of the London production, it did not completely work and also said, "something just went slightly wrong; I had cancer just before the production, and it was just that crucial 5% off-beam".

The hoped-for Broadway production was announced as delayed to spring 2011. Lloyd Webber also announced that Asian and Canadian productions were planned, although these were subsequently dropped. After the poor reviews and negative reaction from some Phantom fans during previews, an executive producer stated that before its bow on Broadway, the show would likely undergo "some changes". On 1 October 2010 it was announced that the musical would not open on Broadway in Spring 2011. To date, Love Never Dies has not played Broadway.

In 2016, five years after the closure of the London production, Paule Constable, the production's lighting designer and member of the original creative team, claimed that working on Love Never Dies almost led her to quit the theatre industry.

=== Australia (2011–2012) ===
In 2010, Lloyd Webber announced that the Australian production would open on 21 May 2011 at Melbourne's Regent Theatre. This production, the first outside of the UK, featured new direction and design by an Australian creative team, including director Simon Phillips. Ben Lewis and Anna O'Byrne were cast as the leads. Before the show's opening, Phillips addressed the negative reaction of fans of Phantom to the London production, stating: "I think the majority of the noise about Love Never Dies wasn't literary. They didn't care that Andrew was creating a sequel to the original story." However, Love Never Dies is not a sequel to Gaston Leroux's original novel, in which the character of the Phantom dies at the end. Phillips additionally addressed the audience's suspension of disbelief with regard to the plot of Love Never Dies: "The central plot idea is that the Phantom and Christine have slept together. If people don't buy that, then they're never going to come onboard with the show, they're never going to respond to it."

Although Lloyd Webber hoped to bring the Melbourne production to Broadway in the future, he told The New York Times that, even with the positive reception of the reworked Melbourne production, a Broadway transfer was probably not realistic. The Melbourne production was filmed on 15 September 2011 and made available on DVD. The recording was originally to be released on DVD and Blu-ray 1 February 2012, but it was later delayed till 29 May 2012 in the United States. In the UK, the DVD was released on 12 March 2012, and in Australia it was released on 8 February 2012. The recorded performance also played in select theatres on 28 February and 7 March 2012. It was then screened again in US cinemas on 23 May 2012. Lloyd Webber stated at the time that, even if a Broadway production did not happen, he felt that he had closed the chapter on the piece, as the filmed version is something he's, "very, very proud of" and it does not really matter to him, "if it comes tomorrow or five years' time". The Melbourne production closed on 18 December 2011.

The Melbourne production transferred to Sydney's Capitol Theatre with previews beginning 8 January 2012 and officially opened on 12 January 2012. The show concluded its run on 1 April 2012. The Courier Mail reported in December 2011 that the show "opened to mixed reviews in Melbourne and has struggled with ticket sales, closing after just seven months. It played in Sydney for three months before closing for good, despite earlier plans for a Brisbane season in the second half of [2012]".

=== Copenhagen (2012–2013) ===
Det Ny Teater in Copenhagen, Denmark announced that their production of Love Never Dies would open on 24 October 2012 and star Tomas Ambt Kofod and Bo Kristian Jensen sharing the role of the Phantom and Danish coloratura soprano Louise Fribo as Christine. It featured a new production design by Paul Farnsworth, new stagings by Daniel Bohr, and new choreography by Hayley Franks Høier. Karen Hoffmann, who translated Phantom of the Opera into Danish, also translated Love Never Dies into Danish. The production closed 21 April 2013.

=== Vienna (2013) ===
A concert rendition, translated entirely into German, was held in Vienna, Austria, in the Raimund Theater in October 2013. It starred Drew Sarich as the Phantom.

=== Tokyo (2014) ===
A Japanese production opened in March 2014 at the Nissay Theatre in Tokyo with direction and designs from the original Australian production. It starred Masachika Ichimura, who performed the role of the Phantom in 1988 Japanese production of original musical, and Takeshi Kaga sharing the role of the Phantom, Megumi Hamada and Ayaka Hirahara as Christine Daaé, Mario Tashiro and Keita Tachibana as Raoul, Mao Ayabuki and Rena Sasamoto as Meg Giry, Ran Ohtori and Tatsuki Kohju as Madame Giry, Mizuho Abe as Fleck, Tomoaki Tatsumi as Squelch, Arata Hino as Gangle and Seishiro Kato, Tsukito Matsui and Eru Yamada as Gustave.

=== Hamburg (2015-2016) ===
The German branch of Stage Entertainment announced a production of Love Never Dies from fall 2015 at the Operettenhaus in Hamburg. The show's title was translated literally as Liebe stirbt nie. The German production was based on the Australian version. Like the Australian version, however, the show closed prematurely and at a loss, with the producers citing low ticket sales as the reason for the closure.

=== U.S. national tour (2017-2018) ===
A touring production, identical to the Hamburg production, but in English, traveled through North America in the 2017–2018 season. It premiered at the Stanley Theatre in Utica, New York on 22 September 2017, and ended on 2 December 2018 at the Bass Concert Hall in Austin, Texas. The cast included Gardar Thor Cortes/Bronson Norris Murphy [later Bronson Norris Murphy/Michael Gillis] as The Phantom, Meghan Picerno/Rachel Anne Moore as Christine Daaé, Karen Mason as Madame Giry, Sean Thompson as Raoul, Mary Michael Patterson as Meg Giry, Katrina Kemp as Fleck, Richard Koons as Squelch, Stephen Petrovich as Gangle, and Casey Lyons and Jake Miller sharing the role of Gustave.

=== Tokyo (2019) ===
Love Never Dies returned to the Nissay Theatre in Tokyo for a limited season in January 2019, it starred Masachika Ichimura and Kanji Ishimaru as the Phantom, Megumi Hamada and Ayaka Hirahara as Christine Daaé, Mario Tashiro and Ryunosuke Onoda as Raoul, Nene Yumesaki and Miyu Sakihi as Meg Giry, Ran Ohtori and Tatsuki Kohju as Madame Giry, Saya Chinen as Fleck, Tomoaki Tatsumi as Squelch, Naoki Shigema as Gangle and Yuuki Oomae, Kenshiro Kato and Toshiki Kumagai as Gustave.

=== World Tour (2021) ===
In January 2020, it was announced that the Australian production would embark on its first ever World tour.

The tour was due to open in the UK on 26 September 2020 at the Curve, Leicester where it would play until 10 October. After which it would visit Manchester Opera House from 14 October to 24 October. Further UK dates were due to be announced. This would have marked the first time the Australian production has been performed in the UK and the musical's return to the UK for the first time since it closed in 2011. The production was since postponed.

The tour was subsequently due to open at the Ed Mirvish Theatre, Toronto on 1 December 2020 and play until 31 January 2021. However, in April 2020 Lloyd-Webber mentioned in a video posted on Twitter that the production would likely be delayed, as the theaters would be closed until January 2021 (due to the COVID-19 pandemic). The filmed Australian production of Love Never Dies was made available on Webber's "The Shows Must Go On!" YouTube channel for a limited time, along with other shows by the composer. It was then performed from 2023 till 2024.

=== West End Concerts (2023; 2026) ===
In May 2023, it was announced there would be a two-night concert production of the new Australian version of Love Never Dies, directed by Shaun Kerrison at Theatre Royal Drury Lane. Performances would be on August 21 and 22 of that same year. This would be the first time this version of the show had been performed in London. The production starred Norm Lewis as the Phantom, Celinde Schoenmaker as Christine Daaé, Sally Dexter as Madame Giry, Courtney Stapleton as Meg, Matthew Seadon-Young as Raoul, and Nic Greenshields as Squelch.

The concert staging is set to return to the West End from October 16–18, 2026, at the London Palladium. Schoenmaker is set to reprise her role as Christine opposite Jamie Muscato as The Phantom. Also in the cast are Stapleton reprising her role of Meg, George Blagden as Raoul, and Mazz Murray as Madame Giry.

=== Tokyo (2025) ===
Love Never Dies returned to the Nissay Theatre in Tokyo for a limited season between January and February 2025, starring Masachika Ichimura, Kanji Ishimaru and Satoshi Hashimoto as the Phantom, Ayaka Hirahara, Rena Sasamoto and Maaya Kiho as Christine Daaé, Mario Tashiro and Kazuki Kato as Raoul, Madoka Hoshikaze and Mayuko Kominami as Meg Giry, Tatsuki Kohju and Sumire Haruno as Madame Giry, Saya Chinen as Fleck, Tomoaki Tatsumi as Squelch, Jun'ichi Kato as Gangle and Ichita Ueki, Osuke Ono and Kaiyoshi Goto as Gustave.

== Synopsis (original London version) ==
=== Act I ===
Madame Giry walks alone at night on a desolate pier, reminiscing about an amusement park called Phantasma, Coney Island's former "City of Wonders". The ghost of Miss Fleck, a freak show performer who once worked with Giry at the park, appears out of the darkness ("Prologue"). When Fleck urges Giry to recall the "good old days" and blames her for "what happened", the audience is suddenly transported back in time as the old, tattered billboards are restored, the lights of Phantasma are illuminated, and an assortment of the park's performers appear in a dreamlike sequence ("The Coney Island Waltz/That's the Place That You Ruined, You Fool!").

It is now ten years after the events at the Paris Opera House and the setting is Phantasma on Coney Island in New York. An excited group of vacationers arrive, overwhelmed at all that Phantasma has to offer. They speculate about the park's reclusive, masked owner and creator, a wealthy tycoon known only as Mr. Y ("Heaven by the Sea").

Meg Giry, Christine Daae's friend from the Opera who was somewhat more intrigued by than afraid of the Phantom in their youth, is now a headlining burlesque performer at Phantasma. Madame Giry, her mother, and the Opera's former ballet mistress is now a business manager and choreographer for the show. Both Meg and her mother are eager to curry favor with their employer to secure their future; as Meg prepares for a performance as "the ooh la la girl", she wonders whether it will please him ("Only for Him/Only for You"). After the show, Madame Giry informs Meg that she has arranged for her to meet an important client, suggesting that Meg has been covertly performing sexual favors for key individuals, in the interest of political and financial expediency for Phantasma.

In a dark, private lair in a tower high above the park, the Phantom (now revealed as Phantasma's owner and mastermind) interacts with an automaton that resembles Christine ("The Aerie"). In spite of the years that have passed and his many successes, the Phantom still longs to be reunited with her ("Til I Hear You Sing"). Meg intrudes and presses the Phantom for feedback on her performance, but he is distracted by his thoughts of Christine and dismisses Meg as an annoyance. Madame Giry is irritated that the Phantom still seems to think only of Christine after all that she and Meg have done for him over the years. Giry recounts how she and Meg helped smuggle him out of Paris and to a ship departing from Calais, on which they escaped to America. Ignoring her, the Phantom summons Miss Fleck, who appears with two other freak show performers, Dr. Gangle and Mr. Squelch. The Phantom has them dispatch a letter to Christine, inviting her to come and perform at Phantasma ("Giry confronts The Phantom/Til' I Hear You Sing (Reprise)").

Three months later, Christine arrives in New York with her husband Raoul and their son Gustave, where they are greeted by crowds of paparazzi at the dock ("Christine Disembarks"). Remarks from the onlookers suggest that Christine has not performed for some time and Raoul has lost much of their fortune to drinking and a fondness for gambling. The Phantom's trio of freak show performers (Fleck, Gangle, and Squelch) arrive in a strange carriage pulled by a "ghost" horse and whisk Christine and her family away to Coney Island ("Arrival of the Trio/Are You Ready to Begin?").

In their rooms, Raoul expresses disgust that their host would send circus freaks to receive them ("What a Dreadful Town!..."). He upsets Gustave by refusing to play with him and storms out to find a bar, leaving Christine to explain his behavior to their son ("Look With Your Heart"). When Gustave goes to bed, the Phantom enters and reveals to a stunned Christine that it was he who summoned her to sing at Phantasma. Initially outraged, Christine eventually succumbs to the memory of a clandestine evening the two shared before she was married. As they recall their one night of passion, it is revealed that Christine was prepared to abandon Raoul for the Phantom, but awoke in the morning to find herself alone. The Phantom explains that he fled out of fear that she would reject him again when she saw his face in the morning light ("Beneath a Moonless Sky"). Both concede that they once thought their love had a chance, but the circumstances of the present day make it impossible ("Once Upon Another Time"). They are startled by a scream from Gustave, who awakens from a nightmare and rushes into the room ("Mother Please, I'm Scared!"). Christine introduces the Phantom as an old friend named Mr. Y, and he promises to show the boy around Phantasma the next day.

In the rehearsal studio at Phantasma, Meg is unexpectedly reunited with Christine, who surprises her with the news that she was invited there to sing. Similarly, Raoul encounters Madame Giry and discovers that it was the Phantom who brought them to Coney Island ("Dear Old Friend").

Later, the freak show trio takes Gustave to meet the Phantom in the Aerie, where the boy is enthralled by the many curious inventions and creations on display. When Gustave plays a haunting melody of his own composition on the piano, the Phantom is once again reminded of his one night with Christine and he is struck by the possibility that this musically gifted child could actually be his son ("Beautiful"). The Phantom questions Gustave about his talents and passions, finding that they are kindred spirits. Believing that Gustave will be able to see past the surface to what is inside, the Phantom is emboldened to remove the mask that hides his deformity ("The Beauty Underneath"). To his dismay, Gustave is horrified and screams at the sight, but Christine enters just in time to calm the boy. When the Phantom confronts her with his suspicions regarding Gustave's paternity, Christine confesses that the child is indeed his son, prompting the Phantom to vow that all his life's work will henceforth be for Gustave ("The Phantom Confronts Christine"). Unbeknownst to them, Madame Giry has overheard their conversation and is enraged, fearing that everything she and Meg have done for the Phantom over the years has been for nothing.

=== Act II ===
A drunken Raoul is sitting alone in a gloomy bar, contemplating the evolution of his relationship with Christine ("Why Does She Love Me?"). Meg enters and warns him that New York isn't a suitable place for his family, and she urges them to abandon Christine's performance contract and leave that night. Raoul refuses, citing their need for the money; he boasts that he is not afraid of the Phantom, unaware that his rival has since slipped in and replaced the barman behind the counter. When Meg leaves, the Phantom confronts Raoul and intimidates him with veiled remarks that cause him to question his paternity of Gustave. The Phantom also offers Raoul a bet: if Christine fails to perform tonight, the Phantom will pay off all their debts and allow them to leave together, but if she sings the aria he has written for her, Raoul must go back to France alone. Raoul accepts the Phantom's dare and then experiences a moment of panic at what he has done ("Devil Take The Hindmost").

Out on the beach, the people are enjoying the last day of the summer season ("Heaven By The Sea (Reprise)"). A hot air balloon lands, carrying the Phantom's trio of freak show performers who announce the evening's entertainment lineup ("Ladies...Gents!/The Coney Island Waltz (Reprise)").

That night, Meg performs a comedic burlesque routine about her choice of swimming costume ("Bathing Beauty"). Afterwards, Madame Giry informs her crestfallen daughter that the Phantom was not there to watch her performance and it had all been for nothing ("Mother, Did You Watch?").

In her dressing room, Raoul implores Christine to reconsider her decision to sing and asks her to leave with him at once if she still loves him. When Raoul leaves her alone to think, the Phantom enters and tells Christine that Raoul knows his love is not enough, and that she must sing for him once more. When he departs, Christine recalls the fateful night at the Paris Opera House when she had to make the difficult decision between the respectable and comfortable life offered by Raoul and the passionate rush of the Phantom and his music ("Before the Performance").

Backstage, Raoul, the Phantom, and Madame Giry each wait anxiously to see whether Christine will flee or sing, while Meg entertains Gustave ("Devil Take The Hindmost (Quartet)").

The stage manager calls "Curtain" and Christine takes her place on stage. The orchestra begins to play and, after a moment of pained indecision, Christine succumbs to the Phantom's music and sings his aria for the appreciative crowd. Her performance is watched from the wings by the Phantom and Raoul until Raoul resigns himself to the decision she has made ("Love Never Dies").

Afterwards, the Phantom joins an overwhelmed Christine in her dressing room and the two share a rapturous moment ("Ah, Christine!"). Christine finds a letter from Raoul stating that he has left for good and she begins to panic when she realizes that Gustave is missing. The Phantom at first assumes that Raoul has taken the boy, but Miss Fleck reveals that she earlier passed Meg's dressing room and saw a smashed mirror and Meg leaving with a small figure. A worried Madame Giry announces that she knows where they were likely going ("Gustave! Gustave!").

On a desolate pier, the Phantom, Christine, and Madame Giry find the distraught Meg seemingly about to drown Gustave in the ocean ("Please Miss Giry, I Want to Go Back!..."). Meg brandishes a gun to make the Phantom finally pay attention to her as she describes the lengths the Girys have gone to over the years to ensure the success of Phantasma, including Meg's offering herself to men in high places to "grease the wheels of [the Phantom's] high-flying deals". The Phantom apologizes for his failure to truly see Meg and her contributions, but when he unthinkingly mentions Christine, Meg becomes enraged and accidentally fires the gun, shooting Christine. The Phantom rushes to Christine and orders Madame Giry to go for help while Meg looks on in stunned horror at what she has done. Christine reveals to Gustave that the Phantom is his real father and she tells the Phantom that her love for him will never die. The Phantom and Christine share a final kiss and she dies in his arms. The Phantom has Meg hold Christine's body as he moves to comfort Gustave, who unmasks him without fear.

== Synopsis (2011 Australian version) ==
=== Act I ===
Ten years after the events at the Paris Opera, the Phantom is now a well known tycoon and the mastermind of Phantasma, a Coney Island amusement park. Despite his success, he is tortured by the absence of Christine Daaé in his life and longs to hear her sing again ("Til I Hear You Sing"). At Phantasma, a trio of freak show performers (Dr. Gangle, Miss Fleck, and Mr. Squelch) introduce the wonders of Coney Island ("The Coney Island Waltz"). Meg Giry, Christine's friend from the Paris Opera, has become "The Ooh La La Girl" in The Phantom's vaudeville show, which Madame Giry produces. Meg and the Phantasma cast win the crowd over with their performance ("Only for You"). Madame Giry has read in the newspaper that Christine is coming to New York to sing for Oscar Hammerstein I at the opening of his new Manhattan opera house. She expresses concern that Meg has lost the attention of the Phantom and reminisces about how she and Meg smuggled him from Paris, France to New York City ten years ago. Meg ignores her mother's warnings, and looks with joy towards her old friend coming to visit after such a long time ("Ten Long Years").

Christine, Raoul and their ten-year-old son Gustave arrive in New York and are met by crowds of paparazzi ("Christine Disembarks"). They are greeted by Gangle, Fleck and Squelch, who arrive in a horseless carriage, to take them to Coney Island ("Are You Ready to Begin?").

Raoul is angry at the reception ("What a Dreadful Town!") and upsets Gustave by not playing with him. When Raoul departs in response to an invitation to meet Hammerstein in the hotel bar, Gustave asks Christine why his father seems not to love him. Christine encourages Gustave to look past the surface to try to help him understand ("Look With Your Heart"). When Gustave goes to bed, the Phantom appears on the balcony and Christine faints in shock, having believed him dead. He carries her to a chair, where she awakens and the two recall a night of passion before Christine's wedding, and the Phantom explains why he felt compelled to leave her side afterwards ("Beneath a Moonless Sky"). Moving to the balcony, the pair sadly remember how they once thought their love had a chance of succeeding ("Once Upon Another Time"). The Phantom offers to pay Christine twice Hammerstein's price if she will sing just one song that he has written for her, but Christine refuses. Gustave wakes up screaming from a nightmare and interrupts them ("Mother Please, I'm Scared!") and Christine introduces him to the Phantom for the first time. The Phantom promises to show Gustave all of Phantasma the next day. After Gustave returns to bed, The Phantom threatens to abduct the boy unless Christine agrees to sing for him again. A shaken Christine relents and the Phantom leaves her with the sheet music for the song he has written.

In the rehearsal studio for Phantasma, Meg is dismayed and hurt to learn that Christine has been assigned the "leading lady slot" in the show. Raoul encounters Madame Giry and discovers that the Phantom is the mysterious Mr. Y for whom Christine will be singing now ("Dear Old Friend"). Gangle, Fleck and Squelch bring Gustave to the Aerie, where he is greeted by the Phantom. Child prodigy Gustave sings and plays a melody on the piano ("Beautiful") that leads the Phantom to suspect he is Gustave's father ("He plays like me! He's just ten years old...ten years old"). The Phantom questions Gustave as he shows him around the dark wonders, illusions, and freaks of Phantasma and discovers that they are kindred spirits. He unmasks himself, believing Gustave will accept him, but Gustave screams in horror and flees ("The Beauty Underneath"). Christine comforts Gustave and then asks Meg to take him back to the hotel. When pressed by the Phantom, Christine confesses that Gustave is his son ("The Phantom Confronts Christine"). The Phantom makes Christine promise to never tell Gustave that Raoul is not his real father. Christine gives her word and vows to sing for him once more, and then leaves him alone. Stunned by what has transpired, the Phantom declares that everything he creates and owns will be inherited by Gustave. An eavesdropping Madame Giry becomes enraged at the realization that all she and Meg have done for the Phantom over the years has been for nothing ("Ten Long Years").

=== Act II ===
In a gloomy bar, Raoul contemplates his relationship with Christine. He is joined by Meg, who tells him she swims each day to wash away the stress of working. She tells Raoul that he must leave with Christine and Gustave and runs out of the bar ("Why Does She Love Me?"). Raoul says he is not afraid of the Phantom. Suddenly, the Phantom reveals himself to Raoul and they make a bet that if Christine sings, the Phantom wins and if she doesn't, Raoul wins. If Raoul wins the bet, the Phantom will pay his debts and Raoul can leave with Christine and Gustave. However, if the Phantom wins, Christine and Gustave will remain in America with him and Raoul must return to Paris alone. The Phantom also leads Raoul to question Gustave's paternity ("Devil Take the Hindmost"). Fleck, Squelch and Gangle appear to advertise Christine's appearance at Phantasma ("Invitation to the Concert"). That night, Meg performs a strip-tease about her choice of swimming costumes ("Bathing Beauty"). She successfully impresses the audience, but Madame Giry reveals to Meg that the Phantom did not watch the performance, saying it was for nothing ("Mother, Did You Watch?").

In Christine's dressing room, Gustave helps his mother get ready for the show. Raoul arrives and Christine asks Gustave to wait for his father backstage. Raoul begs Christine not to sing, and to leave New York with him if she really loves him. Christine asks for some time and Raoul leaves. The Phantom enters and tells Christine that Raoul's love is not enough, and that she must sing for him and embrace her destiny ("Before The Performance"). Christine recalls the events at the Opera where she had to decide between Raoul and the Phantom ("Twisted Every Way"). Madame Giry, Raoul and the Phantom wonder whether Christine will sing ("Devil Take The Hindmost" (Reprise)). The curtain opens on Christine, with Raoul and the Phantom watching from the wings at either side. As the long musical intro comes to its end, Christine makes the decision to sing. Raoul leaves just before Christine finishes to thunderous applause ("Love Never Dies"). Backstage, Christine is greeted lovingly by the Phantom and the two share a kiss. She then finds a letter from Raoul informing her of his departure ("Ah Christine").

Suddenly realising that Gustave is missing, Christine recalls that she had asked him to wait backstage for Raoul, but she does not want to believe that Raoul may have taken the boy. Furious, the Phantom vows to kill the "drunken fool", but Squelch informs him that he saw the Vicomte leave alone. The Phantom then suspects Madame Giry, because of her attitude towards him before Christine's number, and proceeds to threaten Giry when she is brought to him by Squelch and Gangle. Madame Giry confesses that she knew about Gustave's true parentage, but denies abducting the boy. Fleck reports that she passed Meg's dressing room, where she saw that the mirror was shattered, and Meg is now nowhere to be found. Christine fears for her child's life, but Madame Giry assures her that Meg would never hurt Gustave. The Phantom believes he knows where Meg has gone ("Gustave, Gustave").

At the pier, Meg prepares to drown Gustave, who cannot swim, when the others arrive to confront her. She reveals to the Phantom that the resources Madame Giry has afforded him came from Meg's working as a prostitute to influential men. She expresses her hurt and resentment that the Phantom never took any notice of her or appreciated her singing and dancing. After sharing her feelings, Meg decides to let Gustave live and releases him. She produces a gun and holds it to her head, intent on ending her misery. The Phantom tries to apologise and console her, but when he unthinkingly mentions Christine's name, Meg becomes agitated once again. When the Phantom tries to take the gun from her, Meg accidentally shoots Christine ("Please Miss Giry, I Want to Go Back").

After Madame Giry and Meg are dispatched to find help, Christine reveals to Gustave that the Phantom is his real father and the shocked boy flees ("Look with Your Heart" (Reprise)). Christine tells the Phantom that her love for him will never die, then they share a final kiss and she dies in his arms ("Once Upon Another Time" (Reprise)). Gustave returns with Raoul, who looks on silently and sadly, and Gustave lays his head on his mother's lap. The Phantom surrenders Christine's body to Raoul, then moves to the edge of the pier and collapses to his knees in grief. Gustave goes to the weeping Phantom, who sings a line from the song his mother just sang to console the boy, and Gustave embraces his real father for the first time ("Love Never Dies" (Reprise)). Gustave then removes the Phantom's mask and gently touches the Phantom's face in an act of acceptance. Gustave and the Phantom gaze at one another as the curtain falls.

== Characters and original cast ==
The following is a list of the principal roles of original English speaking casts of Love Never Dies.

Character	Original West End Production	Final West End Cast	Original Australian Production	Original North American Tour	West End Concert	China Tour
Character	2010	2011		2017	2023	
The Phantom of the Opera	Ramin Karimloo	Ramin Karimloo Tam Mutu	Ben Lewis	Garðar Thór Cortes Bronson Norris Murphy	Norm Lewis	Luke McCall John Ellis
Christine Daaé	Sierra Boggess	Celia Graham	Anna O'Byrne	Meghan Picerno Rachel Anne Moore	Celinde Schoenmaker	Manon Taris Olivia Holland Rose Georgie Ashford
Meg Giry	Summer Strallen	Haley Flaherty	Sharon Millerchip	Mary Michael Patterson	Courtney Stapleton	Olivia Barnett Legh
Raoul, Vicomte de Chagny	Joseph Millson	David Thaxton	Simon Gleeson	Sean Thompson	Matthew Seadon-Young	Niall Sheehy
Madame Giry	Liz Robertson	Liz Robertson	Maria Mercedes	Karen Mason	Sally Dexter	Britt Lenting
Gustave	Jack Blass Harry Child Tyler Fagan Alexander Hockaday Richard Linnell Charlie Manton Kaisun Raj	Edward Bracey Jack Costello Daniel Dowling Connor Fitzgerald George Littell Harry Polden	George Cartwright Bush Trent Heath Lachlan Kelly Jack Lyall Kurtis Papadinis	Jake Heston Miller Casey J. Lyons Christian Harmston	Cian Eagle-Service	Jack Sherran Odo Rowntree-Bailly Zayne Norris Zachary Richardson
Squelch	Adam Pearce	Adam Pearce	Paul Ettore Tabone	Richard Koons	Nic Greenshields	Chris Draper
Gangle	Jami Reid-Quarrell	Charles Brunton	Dean Vince	Stephen Petrovich	Charles Brunton	Nic Cain
Fleck	Niamh Perry	Tracey Penn	Emma J. Hawkins	Katrina Kemp	Lucie-Mae Sumner	Katrina Kemp

== Musical numbers ==
=== The Concept Album ===
The Original Concept Album was released in March 2010. It peaked at number 10 on the UK Albums Chart, No. 1 in Greece, No. 8 in New Zealand and No. 15 in Denmark. The musical numbers appear in the following order on the original album.

Disc 1

- "Prologue" – The Orchestra, Madame Giry and Fleck
- "The Coney Island Waltz" – The Orchestra
- "That's the Place That You Ruined, You Fool!" – Madame Giry and Fleck
- "Heaven by the Sea" – Ensemble
- "Only for Him/Only for You" – Meg, Fleck, Gangle, Squelch and Ensemble
- "The Aerie" – The Orchestra
- "'Til I Hear You Sing" – The Phantom
- "Giry Confronts the Phantom/'Til I Hear You Sing (Reprise)" – Madame Giry, Meg and The Phantom
- "Christine Disembarks" – The Orchestra, Christine, Raoul, Gustave and Ensemble
- "Arrival of the Trio: "Are You Ready to Begin?" – Fleck, Gangle, Squelch, Christine, Raoul, Gustave and Ensemble
- "What a Dreadful Town!..." – Christine, Raoul and Gustave
- "Look with Your Heart" – Christine and Gustave
- "Beneath a Moonless Sky" – The Phantom and Christine
- "Once Upon Another Time" – The Phantom and Christine
- "Mother Please, I'm Scared!" – The Phantom, Christine and Gustave
- "Dear Old Friend" – Christine, Raoul, Meg and Madame Giry
- "Beautiful" – The Phantom, Gustave, Fleck, Gangle and Squelch
- "The Beauty Underneath" – The Phantom and Gustave
- "The Phantom Confronts Christine" – The Phantom, Christine and Madame Giry

Disc 2

- "Entr'acte" – The Orchestra
- "Why Does She Love Me?" – Raoul and Meg
- "Devil Take the Hindmost" – Raoul and The Phantom
- "Heaven by the Sea (Reprise)" – Ensemble
- "Ladies...Gents!/The Coney Island Waltz (Reprise)" – Fleck, Gangle, Squelch, Ensemble and The Orchestra
- "Bathing Beauty" – Meg and Ensemble
- "Mother, Did You Watch?" – Meg and Madame Giry
- "Before the Performance" – Gustave, Christine, Raoul and The Phantom
- "Devil Take the Hindmost (Quartet)" – Raoul, The Phantom, Meg and Madame Giry
- "Love Never Dies" – Christine
- "Ah, Christine!" – Christine, The Phantom and Raoul
- "Gustave! Gustave!" – Christine, The Phantom, Madame Giry, Fleck and Squelch
- "Please Miss Giry, I Want to Go Back!..." – Meg, Gustave, Christine, The Phantom and Madame Giry

=== London ===
The Original London production opened with all the songs from the Concept Album. However, the show went through several rewrites and many of the songs were rearranged and some were removed from the production. Charles Hart, one of the original lyricists from The Phantom of the Opera, was brought in to help with the rewrites. Below are the musical numbers as they last appeared in the London Production.

Act I

1. "Prologue" – The Orchestra
2. "'Til I Hear You Sing" – The Phantom
3. "The Coney Island Waltz" – The Orchestra
4. "Only For You"^{†} – Meg Giry, Fleck, Squelch, Gangle and Ensemble
5. "Ten Long Years"^{†}* – Meg and Madame Giry
6. "Christine Disembarks" – Raoul, Gustave and Ensemble
7. "Arrival Of The Trio: "Are You Ready to Begin…?" – Fleck, Gangle, Squelch, Raoul, Gustave and Ensemble
8. "What A Dreadful Town…!" – Raoul, Christine and Gustave
9. "Look With Your Heart" – Christine and Gustave
10. "Beneath A Moonless Sky" – Christine and The Phantom
11. "Once Upon Another Time" – Christine and The Phantom
12. "Mother Please, I'm Scared…!" – The Phantom, Gustave and Christine
13. "Ten Long Years Of Yearning"*^{†} – The Phantom and Christine
14. "Dear Old Friend"^{†} – Meg, Madame Giry, Christine, Raoul, Gustave and Ensemble
15. "Beautiful" – Gustave, Fleck, Gangle, Squelch and The Phantom
16. "The Beauty Underneath" – The Phantom and Gustave
17. "Phantom Confronts Christine" – The Phantom, Christine and Madame Giry

Act II

1. Entr'acte – The Orchestra
2. "Why Does She Love Me?" – Raoul, Meg and Ensemble
3. "Devil Take the Hindmost"^{†} – Raoul and The Phantom
4. "Invitation to the Concert" – Fleck, Gangle, Squelch and Ensemble
5. "Bathing Beauty" – Meg, Fleck, Gangle, Squelch and Ensemble
6. "Before the Performance" – Christine, Raoul, Gustave and The Phantom
7. "Devil Take the Hindmost (Quartet)" – Gustave, Raoul, The Phantom, Madame Giry and Meg
8. "Love Never Dies" – Christine
9. "Ah, Christine…!" – The Phantom and Christine
10. "Gustave! Gustave…!" – Christine, The Phantom, Madame Giry, Fleck, Gangle and Squelch
11. "Please Miss Giry, I Want to Go Back…" – Gustave, Meg, Madame Giry, The Phantom and Christine
12. Finale** – The Phantom and Christine
13. Playout – The Orchestra

Notes:

^{†} denotes new lyrics by Charles Hart.

* denotes new song; lyrics by Hart.

** denotes new scene/song; lyrics by Glenn Slater.

=== Melbourne and subsequent productions ===
The Original (reworked) Australian production opened with many of the songs from the reworked London production with new staging. The reworked libretto is the one currently used by subsequent productions. New lyrics by original The Phantom of the Opera lyricist Charles Hart. Staging and musical numbers for the Australian and subsequent productions:

Act I

1. "Prologue" – The Orchestra and The Phantom
2. "'Til I Hear You Sing" (includes "The Aerie") – The Phantom
3. "The Coney Island Waltz" – Squelch, Fleck, Gangle, Ensemble & The Orchestra
4. "Only for You"✝ – Meg Giry, Ensemble
5. " 'Mother, Did You See…?' "/" 'Ten Long Years…' "/"Meg's Aria"✝ – Meg and Madame Giry
6. "Christine Disembarks" – Raoul, Gustave, Christine and Ensemble
7. "Arrival Of The Trio: 'Are You Ready to Begin…?' " – Fleck, Gangle, Squelch, Raoul, Gustave and Ensemble
8. " 'What A Dreadful Town…!' " – Raoul, Christine and Gustave
9. "Look With Your Heart" – Christine and Gustave
10. "Beneath A Moonless Sky" – Christine and The Phantom
11. "Once Upon Another Time" – Christine and The Phantom
12. " 'Mother Please, I'm Scared…!' " – The Phantom, Gustave and Christine
13. " 'Ten Long Years of Yearning…' "✝ – The Phantom and Christine
14. "Dear Old Friend"✝ – Meg, Madame Giry, Christine, Raoul, Gustave and Ensemble
15. "Beautiful" – Gustave, Fleck, Gangle, Squelch and The Phantom
16. "The Beauty Underneath"✝ – The Phantom and Gustave
17. "The Phantom Confronts Christine" – The Phantom, Christine and Madame Giry

Act II

1. Entr'acte – The Orchestra
2. "Why Does She Love Me?" – Raoul, Meg and Ensemble
3. "Devil Take the Hindmost"✝ – Raoul and The Phantom
4. "Invitation to the Concert" – Fleck, Gangle, Squelch and Ensemble
5. "Bathing Beauty" – Meg, Fleck, Gangle, Squelch and Ensemble
6. " 'Mother, Did You Watch…?' " – Meg, Madame Giry
7. "Before the Performance" – Christine, Raoul, Gustave and The Phantom
8. "Devil Take the Hindmost (Quartet)"✝ – Gustave, Raoul, The Phantom, Madame Giry and Meg
9. "Love Never Dies" – Christine
10. " 'Ah, Christine…!' " – The Phantom and Christine
11. "The Streets Of Coney Island ('Gustave…! Gustave…!')" – Christine, The Phantom, Madame Giry, Fleck, Gangle and Squelch
12. " 'Please Miss Giry, I Want To Go Back…' " – Gustave, Meg, The Phantom, Madame Giry and Christine
13. "Finale" – The Phantom
14. Playout – The Orchestra

Notes: ✝ denotes new lyrics by original The Phantom of the Opera lyricist Charles Hart.

The Copenhagen and Tokyo productions have translated the libretto from English to Danish (by Karen Hoffmann) and Japanese (by Ryu Machiko).

== Recordings ==
=== Singles ===
The first song released to the public was "The Coney Island Waltz", on the musical's official website as part of a Love Never Dies' teaser trailer video in September 2009. The teaser trailer combined clips from the 2009 London EPK video of The Phantom of the Opera (featuring Gina Beck, Ramin Karimloo, and Simon Bailey) with black-and-white film footage of immigrants arriving by ship in New York City and shots of Coney Island. The official site later released "The Coney Island Waltz" as a sample track in 2009 and as a complimentary music download for customers pre-ordering the Love Never Dies studio recording album. The music video for "The Coney Island Waltz" is set to archival film footage of Coney Island.

"Til I Hear You Sing", sung by Ramin Karimloo, was the first single from the musical and previewed on 20 February 2010 through The Mail on Sunday website. It previewed elsewhere on 22 February 2010. It is a love ballad about the male narrator expressing his longing to hear the voice of his beloved after many years. The promotional music video was an excerpt of Ramin Karimloo's live performance at 8 October 2009 London press launch and made viewable the same day, with Karimloo singing in a blue-lit set while Sierra Boggess sits quietly on a throne. The official music video features Karimloo undisguised in a flat with a backdrop of projector images and floating appearance of Boggess.

On 26 January 2010 the title song "Love Never Dies" was first publicly performed at The South Bank Show Awards, sung by Sierra Boggess and accompanied by Lloyd Webber and Louise Hunt on two grand pianos. The show was broadcast on ITV1 on 31 January 2010. The tune is identical to Lloyd Webber's other musical numbers "Our Kind of Love" from The Beautiful Game in 2000 and "The Heart is Slow to Learn", which was intended for a Phantom sequel, sung by Kiri Te Kanawa in 1998 at the Andrew Lloyd Webber: The Royal Albert Hall Celebration. "Love Never Dies" also has a very similar melody to Charles Williams' composition "Jealous Lover" from the 1949 British film The Romantic Age. "Jealous Lover" was later retitled "Theme from The Apartment" for the 1960 Billy Wilder film The Apartment.

Welsh singer Katherine Jenkins was approached by Lloyd Webber to record her version of "Love Never Dies" in late 2009. The song appears as the first track on the special edition of Jenkins' album Believe, which was released on 29 March 2010 in the UK. Jenkins performed the song with Lloyd Webber on the ITV1 show Dancing on Ice on 28 February 2010. Lloyd Webber has stated that Jenkins would not fit the score of his musical Love Never Dies because her vocal range is a mezzo-soprano, not a soprano like Sierra Boggess.

Japanese singer Ayaka Hirahara was chosen to record "Love Never Dies" in Japanese for a bonus track of the soundtrack album's Japanese release. "Love Never Dies" was also recorded in Mandarin by Liping Zhang and in Korean by Sumi Jo.

=== Discography ===
The concept album of Love Never Dies was recorded around 2008–2009, using an 80–90 piece orchestra. Lloyd Webber did not like the orchestrations in the second act, so he had half the album re-recorded. John Barrowman had originally recorded the part of Raoul on the concept album but was replaced by Joseph Millson, who had been cast as Raoul for the stage production at the time the album was re-orchestrated and re-recorded. Sally Dexter, who performed Madame Giry on the album, is replaced by Liz Robertson in the musical. The album was completed in September 2009 and scheduled to be released on 10 March 2010, the day after the show's London opening. Preview sound clips from all tracks on the album became available online on 8 February 2010 at Amazon.co.uk.

A cast recording of the original production was released on 8 March 2010 by Polydor Records in the UK and on 9 March 2010 by Decca Records in North America. It debuted at No. 82 on the Billboard 200, No. 1 on the Billboard Cast Album chart, and No. 10 on the UK Albums Chart. It also charted at No. 1 in Greece, No. 14 in Taiwan, No. 8 in New Zealand, and No. 15 in Denmark.

==== Albums ====
Love Never Dies Deluxe Edition [Original Cast Recording]
Release date: 8 March 2010 (UK), 9 March 2010 (North America)
Number of discs: 2 Audio CDs, 1 DVD-Video
Extras include: "Bonus DVD with interviews and filmed footage and 40 page booklet with full libretto"

Love Never Dies [Original Cast Recording]
Release date: 8 March 2010 (UK), 9 March 2010 (North America)
Number of discs: 2 Audio CDs

Both recordings feature the same 19 tracks on Disc 1 and 13 tracks on Disc 2 with each disc matching an act.
A digital version of the double CD album was also made available on the Love Never Dies official online store.

Charts

Chart (2010)	Peak position
Austrian Albums (Ö3 Austria)	53
Danish Albums (Hitlisten)	17
European Top 100 Albums (Billboard)	—
German Albums (Offizielle Top 100)	73
Greek Albums (IFPI)	1
New Zealand Albums (RMNZ)	8
Scottish Albums (Official Charts)	18
Swedish Albums (Sverigetopplistan)	45
UK Albums (Official Charts)	10
US Billboard 200	82
"—" means the peak position on that chart remains unknown or is not stated by the source citing the chart.

Love Never Dies: Asian edition
Release date: 30 March 2010 (North America)
Number of discs: 2 Audio CDs
Extras include: 2 bonus tracks, "Love Never Dies" (Mandarin language version) by Liping Zhang and "Love Never Dies" (Korean language version) by Sumi Jo.

Love Never Dies: 2018 Studio Cast

Release date: 15 February 2018

Number of discs: 2 Audio CDs

Album-only track titled "Conclusion"

=== Live stage filming ===
The original Australian production of the musical starring Ben Lewis, Anna O'Byrne, Simon Gleeson, Sharon Millerchip, and Maria Mercedes was released in DVD and Blu-ray on 29 May 2012 by Universal Studios Home Entertainment in the United States.

== Reception ==
=== West End ===
==== Critics' reaction ====
After Love Never Dies opened on 9 March 2010 in London, it received mostly negative critical reviews. Perhaps the most positive review was Paul Taylor's in The Independent giving the show five stars, and writing, "What is in no doubt is the technical excellence of Jack O'Brien's seamlessly fluent, sumptuous (and sometimes subtle) production, or the splendour of the orchestra which pours forth Lloyd Webber's dark-hued, yearning melodies as if its life depended on them. Special praise should go to the lyrical lavishness of Bob Crowley and Jon Driscoll's designs, with their gilt interiors where the vegetation-imitating contours and giant peacock-plumage of Art Nouveau run rampant, and their ghostly external locations where a brilliantly deployed combination of flowing projection (timed to perfection with emotional/ rhythmic shifts in the music) and solidly presented stage-effects create a dizzying Coney Island of the mind". In stark contrast, Ben Brantley of The New York Times was overwhelmingly negative, calling the production "a big, gaudy new show. And he might as well have a "kick me" sign pasted to his backside. ... This poor sap of a show feels as eager to be walloped as a clown in a carnival dunking booth. Why bother, when from beginning to end, Love Never Dies is its very own spoiler."

Other positive reviews included Charles Spencer of The Daily Telegraph, who raved, "this is Lloyd Webber's finest show since the original Phantom, with a score blessed with superbly haunting melodies and a yearning romanticism that sent shivers racing down my spine." He gave the show four stars out of five, but cautioned that "The show may ultimately prove too strange, too dark, too tormented to become a massive popular hit, but I suspect its creepy allure will linger potently in the memory when frothier shows have been long forgotten". Paul Callan of the Daily Express also gave the show four stars, writing that Love Never Dies "is an elegant and clever sequel to Phantom and deserves to have the old Adelphi Theatre filled every night with Lloyd Webber's core, usually middle-class, audiences. It is a great night out."

In The Guardian, Michael Billington gave the show three out of five stars, commenting, "There is much to enjoy in Andrew Lloyd Webber's new musical. The score is one of the composer's most seductive." However, Billington said, "The problems lie within the book ... which lacks the weight to support the imaginative superstructure." He continues, "the staging is a constant source of iridescent pleasure. But, as one of the lyrics reminds us, "diamonds never sparkle bright unless they are set just right". ... With a libretto to match the melodies, this might have been a stunner rather than simply a good night out". Tim Walker of The Sunday Telegraph praised the production for "what are undoubtedly the most impressive special effects to be had in the West End" and said the principals sang "with gusto, charisma and sexiness." Still, he found himself, "yearning after a while for the big showstopper ... but it never came."

In The Times, critic Benedict Nightingale gave the show two out of five stars and recommended audiences see the still-running Phantom at Her Majesty's Theatre, saying, "Where's the menace, the horror, the psychological darkness? For that I recommend a trip to Her Majesty's, not the Adelphi." Another unenthusiastic review appeared in the Evening Standard, where critic Henry Hitchings wrote that "while Lloyd Webber's music is at times lavishly operatic, the tone is uneven. There are no more than a couple of songs that promise to live in the memory, the duets don’t soar, and the ending is insipid. Admirers of Phantom are likely to be disappointed, and there's not enough here to entice a new generation of fans". Hitchings also commented that the story "is largely predictable—and flimsy. The chief problem is the book. ... It lacks psychological plausibility. Worse, it lacks heart. There's little pathos or emotional tension. There is also scarcely a moment of humour [the] lyrics are prosaic, and the flickers of light relief are merely confusing." Similarly, David Benedict of Variety wrote that the show "wants to be a tragic romance, but it's simply torpid. Only a radical rewrite will give it even the remotest chance of emulating its predecessor."

Susannah Clapp of The Observer was also critical of the book and called the show "drab" and "about as tension-filled as winding wool." Even the musical numbers, she wrote, "never meld with the visual splendours, never give the effect, which is Lloyd Webber's gift, of the music delivering the scenery." Sam Marlowe of Time Out London gave the show one out of five stars, calling it "ghastly" and "an interminable musical monstrosity". She observes: "With its sickening swirls of video imagery, pointless plot, and protracted, repetitive songs, Love Never Dies ... is punishingly wearisome."

Other negative reviews appeared in the Financial Times, Entertainment Weekly, The Arts Desk, and many others.

==== Audience and other assessments ====
Dave Itzkoff of The New York Times reported on fan reaction: "How is the new Phantom faring with theatergoers who have seen it in previews? Not so well. ... Elsewhere online, 'Love Never Dies' has even spawned a Facebook protest group called 'Love Should Die', which declares in its mission statement: 'We feel strongly that Andrew Lloyd Webber’s latest musical ... is a completely misguided venture that is a detriment to the story of the original Phantom of the Opera novel and musical of the same name'. ... Virtually everything about the show strikes us as illogical, irrational, offensive and—frankly—stupid." A barbed reworking of the show's title from Love Never Dies to Paint Never Dries was originated by the London-based theatre bloggers, The West End Whingers. It has subsequently been picked up and repeated by a multitude of journalists, both in print and on screen. Columnist Barbara Ellen of The Observer ridiculed the pomposity of some of the unfavourable reviews in her column on Sunday 28 March 2010, in a jokey "Open letter to London's famous Adelphi theatre".

=== Australia ===
The reworked production received mixed reviews during its engagements in Melbourne and Sydney, but it was generally better received than in London.

Chris Boyd, of The Australian called the musical, "The best thing Lloyd Webber has written in the quarter century since Phantom of the Opera, Love Never Dies is still a missed opportunity. It toys half-heartedly with domestic melancholia. Christine's wealthy suitor Raoul, 10 years on, is an insecure and possessive husband who uses his wife's talents to pay off his gambling debts. He frets that he cannot deliver to Christine "the rush that music brings", leaving her vulnerable, once more, to her angel of music. Love Never Dies provides several of those rush moments, but doesn't quite connect the starry dots. Musically, there are some riches—a fluttering duet between Meg and Christine for example [official DVD time reference 46:48 to 47:41]—but few surprises." Meg and Christine, when they first meet after ten years, sing a brief duet about how long it has been, their initial surprise ("...could it be? No, it couldn't possibly..."), and how lovely the other looks, in an introduction to the song "Dear Old Friend". As for Gabriela Tylesova's sets such as, "Coney Island carnival, deco interiors, a shabby bar," he found them, "endlessly fascinating; they're spectacular without being ostentatious. The main feature is an upright metal circle, part Luna Park mouth, part Stargate. Her costumes, too, are gorgeous."

Jason Blake of the Sydney Morning Herald said, "Phillips's production steers clear of "chandelier moments", favouring sustained invention, seamless flow and an engulfing sense of nightmare. There's wow factor, of course (a galloping carousel is an early highlight) though quieter scenes are realised with the same attention to detail, particularly the recreation of a Coney Island bar to frame Raoul's saloon song feature (Why Does She Love Me) and his face-off with Mr Y (Devil Take the Hindmost). An inspired, often ravishing production for sure, though of a sequel that doesn't make a strong enough musical or narrative argument for its own existence."

In the Daily Express, Mark Shenton commented, "Now under the new leadership of director Simon Phillips, and with a fresh creative team, there is a new vision to the show in Australia and here, at last, is the masterpiece that was always crying to be let out...The new production has a spectacular Gothic theatricality that heightens, deepens and darkens those emotions."

Kate Herbert of the Herald Sun gave the show four out of five stars and wrote, "With its vivid design, eccentric characters and mystical imagery, this is a ravishing spectacle that captures the dark mystery of a perilous fairground (circa 1907) and should convert even a die-hard Phantom fan." She also said, "Lloyd Webber's score (conducted skilfully by Guy Simpson) intermittently and elegantly reprises the original Phantom, connecting the two stories" but she did feel that, "several songs, with trite lyrics, lack punch. A bigger problem is the unsatisfying story. There are unnecessary Red Herrings and too many villains."

William Yeoman of The West Australian wrote, "With book by Ben Elton and lyrics by Glenn Slater and Charles Hart, Love Never Dies is a curious mixture of gothic romance, vaudeville and verismo, with Lloyd Webber's lush, romantic score spinning like a fairground ride from Puccini to Pulcinella to driving rock to delicate aria as the tragedy unfolds. Under Simon Phillips' unfailingly cogent direction, the cast too manage to transform the most unpromising material, if not into gold then at least into silver."

Cameron Woodhead of The Age gave the show three and a half out of five stars and said, "Between Gabriela Tylesova's set and costumes, Nick Schlieper's lighting, and Graeme Murphy's choreography, you’re in for some spectacular stagecraft. After the Phantom pines for Christine and ascends to the gods ('Til I Hear You Sing), the scene breaks into an elaborate circus (Coney Island Waltz). Introduced by a trio of freaks, the amusement swells into a crowd of acrobats and stilt-walkers, fire-twirlers and magicians, with Luna Park-like plastic heads, a portable big-top, and rows of carnies singing from rollercoaster tracks suspended mid-air. It's breathtaking stuff, and not the best of Love Never Dies' dark illusionism. That honor belongs to a scene, deeper into Coney, where transparent obelisks caging eldritch wonders—including a gilded mermaid—rotate across the stage."

Rebecca Saffir of Time Out gave the production two stars, calling the show "an act of such glorious hubris", "incredibly weak material", and "sentimental, nonsensical, ideologically conservative drivel". Echoing complaints from the London critics, Saffir criticised the plot ("so thin it should be put on a cheeseburger diet") and the inconsistencies between the characters as depicted in the original Phantom and their motivations as presented in Love Never Dies.

=== US tour ===
Critical reaction to Love Never Dies during its 2017–18 US tour has been mixed, although leaning towards the negative. Perhaps the most positive review to date came from the Detroit Free Press, which called the show "lively, lavish and way over the top as melodrama" and gave it three out of four stars. The Pittsburgh Post-Gazette praised the production's spectacle but expressed reservations about the "hand-to-forehead drama". Similarly, The San Diego Union-Tribune complimented the set design (although noting "it lacks the grandeur of the opera house") but concluded that the "melodramatic direction" and "weak script and score" made for a "disappointing" evening. Although it had praise for the sets, the Star Tribune complained that the show felt stale, comparing it to "a salad with the last of the Thanksgiving turkey". The Oakland Press considered the musical "hugely uneven", the first act being a "turgid mess" but the second act "far superior" and "more concise". Both the Chicago Tribune and the Daily Herald gave only two and a half stars out of five to the production, the former considering it "not even remotely on the same plane" as the original Phantom, with the latter finding that it "comes across like mediocre fan fiction". The Chicago Sun Times found the musical "a disappointing world apart from the original on almost every level", while the Houston Chronicle deemed it "unbearable" and "impossible to believe".

Complaints about the show's plot and characterizations, which have plagued it since the original London premiere, continue to be voiced frequently, with both Orlando Weekly and Orlando Sentinel describing the show and its narrative as "misguided". Similarly, Cape Cod Times's review stated that, "for the longtime Phantom fan, the plot just does not add up", commenting that it "makes all of the original show’s characters far less likable than before and completely throws out its timeline", although it did praise the physical production and performers. The Los Angeles Times, observing that "the storytelling requires viewers to make leaps of logic and to reassess several beloved characters", concurred with this view and accused Love Never Dies of "messing with the original in ways that will taint some fans' memories. That's a dangerous thing to do with such a valuable property." Although praising the show's sets, the Buffalo News opined that the "story is just an absurd mess, a ridiculous, self-indulgent, hastily written, on the back of a napkin, kind of stupid, silly mess". The Charlotte Observer similarly complained that "Ben Elton’s book makes nonsense of its antecedent and no sense on its own."

The Providence Journal criticised the show's "cheap histrionics" and deemed it "an embarrassment, an overblown tearjerker". Sharing this sentiment, the Cleveland Scene panned Love Never Dies as "a misbegotten attempt to cash in on the popularity of the Phantom franchise". The Tribune Chronicle's reviewer lamented its "truly bizarre choices to get out from under The Phantom of the Opera's shadow", ultimately concluding: "I can’t think of a national tour [...] that I enjoyed less". Boston's WBUR-FM summarized Love Never Dies as "a highly stylish, colorfully rendered mess", adding that "the whole thing is just schmaltzy and preposterous". The Las Vegas Review-Journal accused Love Never Dies, "a hand-wringing, heart-clutching melodrama so overdone it invites unintentional giggles", of "besmirching fond memories" of "its illustrious predecessor". Houstonia also compared Love Never Dies unfavourably to the original Phantom.

In February 2018, the Chicago Tribune reported that the Love Never Dies tour was discounting tickets, with seats "widely available on weeknights". An interview with Glenn Slater in March 2018 suggested that there are no current plans for Love Never Dies to play Broadway. However, Randy Buck, the tour's musical producer and CEO of Troika Entertainment, said the following month that a limited-engagement Broadway run is "certainly a possibility."

=== Academic reception ===
The most extended piece of scholarship on Love Never Dies is by David Chandler in a piece included in The Oxford Handbook to the British Musical. Although opining The Phantom of the Opera, together with Jesus Christ Superstar, to be "at the summit of Lloyd Webber's achievement", Chandler considers Love Never Dies "badly judged" and "one of the oddest sequels in theatrical history, shaped by a peculiar love-hate relationship to its original. On one hand it shores up the position The Phantom of the Opera occupies as Lloyd Webber's central, defining musical; on the other it seems intent, in a rather Freudian way, on displacement, on destroying the authority of the earlier work". Chandler takes issue with the incompatibility of the plot and character motivations expressed in Love Never Dies vis-à-vis those in the original Phantom of the Opera: "As sequel and original are erected on such different imaginative premises they cannot both be true".

== Awards ==
=== Original London production ===
Year	Award	Category	Nominee	Result
2011	Laurence Olivier Awards	Best New Musical		Nominated
2011	Laurence Olivier Awards	Best Actor in a Musical	Ramin Karimloo	Nominated
2011	Laurence Olivier Awards	Best Actress in a Musical	Sierra Boggess	Nominated
2011	Laurence Olivier Awards	Best Supporting Performance in a Musical	Summer Strallen	Nominated
2011	Laurence Olivier Awards	Best Lighting Design	Paul Constable	Nominated
2011	Laurence Olivier Awards	Best Set Design	Bob Crowley	Nominated
2011	Laurence Olivier Awards	Best Costume Design	Bob Crowley	Nominated

=== Original Australian production ===
Year	Award	Category	Nominee	Result
2012	Sydney Theatre Awards	Best Stage Design of a Mainstage Production	Gabriela Tylesova	Nominated
2012	Sydney Theatre Awards	Best Costume Design	Gabriela Tylesova	Won
2012	Sydney Theatre Awards	Best Lighting Design	Nick Schlieper	Nominated
2012	Sydney Theatre Awards	Best Production of a Musical		Nominated
2012	Sydney Theatre Awards	Best Leading Actress in a Musical	Anna O'Byrne	Nominated
2012	Sydney Theatre Awards	Best Leading Actor in a Musical	Ben Lewis	Won
2012	Sydney Theatre Awards	Best Supporting Actress in a Musical	Sharon Millerchip	Nominated
2012	Sydney Theatre Awards	Best Supporting Actor in a Musical	Simon Gleeson	Nominated
