= Liz Robertson =

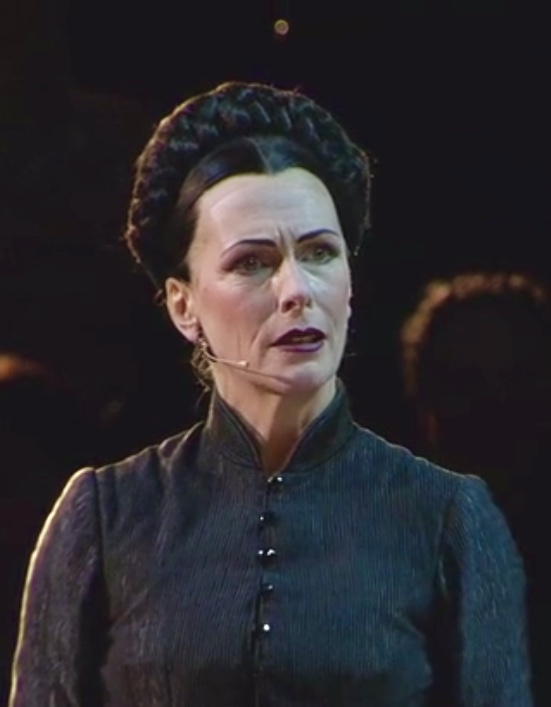
- Liz Robertson as Madame Giry Phantom of the Opera 25th anniversary at the Royal Albert Hall

Background information
- Born: 4 May 1954 (age 72); Ilford, Essex, England
- Genres: Musical theatre
- Occupations: Actress, singer

Liz Robertson (born 4 May 1954) is an English actress and singer and the widow of playwright and lyricist Alan Jay Lerner. She is especially well known for her performances as Madame Giry, having played the role in the original cast of Love Never Dies at the Adelphi Theatre, in The Phantom of the Opera at Her Majesty's Theatre and in The Phantom of the Opera at the Royal Albert Hall.

== Early life ==
Born in Ilford, Essex, Robertson began training at the Finch Stage School at the age of three.

== Career ==
Robertson's first professional employment was as a cabaret dancer at London's Savoy Hotel at the age of 16. Shortly afterward, she joined a dance group called The Go-Jo's, and a year later she became the lead singer and dancer of BBC Two's The Young Generation.

Robertson's West End career began with A Little Night Music, directed by Hal Prince, and the revue Side By Side By Sondheim, which she subsequently took to Toronto with Georgia Brown. Other London theatre credits include I Love My Wife, My Fair Lady, Jerome Kern Goes to Hollywood, Song and Dance, The Phantom of the Opera, Love Never Dies, and The Music Man.

Robertson made her Broadway debut in Dance a Little Closer, the disastrous 1983 musical adaptation of Idiot's Delight by Charles Strouse and her husband, Alan Jay Lerner, that closed on opening night. In 1986 she returned to Broadway with the Kern revue, which ran for 24 performances and proved to be her last Broadway appearance to date. She starred in an extensive US tour of The King and I and performed at the Kennedy Center before President Ronald Reagan and his wife, Nancy.

She presented her one-woman show, Just Liz, at the Chichester Festival Theatre and the Duke of York's Theatre in London. It later was taped and broadcast by Television South. She is also a regular performer and part of the original cast of the touring play Seven Deadly Sins Four Deadly Sinners. She starred in the musical Hairspray at the Shaftesbury Theatre, performing the role of 'Velma Von Tussle'. She played the Wicked Queen in the Bristol Hippodrome Pantomime, Snow White from 11 December 2009, and the Fairy Godmother in Cinderella at the same for the Christmas 2013 run.

She appeared as ‘Miss Smythe/Miss Andrew’ in the second London revival of Mary Poppins at the Prince Edward Theatre. The production reopened on the 7th of August 2021 after being closed due to the COVID-19 Pandemic, until its final show on 8 January 2023.

== Charity work ==
She is a trustee of The Theatrical Guild, the charity supporting backstage and front of house, and was chairperson from 2005 to 2009.

== Personal life ==
She married Alan Jay Lerner in August 1981 in Billingshurst, England. The couple met when he directed her in a revival of My Fair Lady.
