= Alexander Lewis (actor) =

English-Australian musical theatre actor

Alexander Lewis is an English-Australian operatic tenor and musical theatre actor who has performed in many countries.

== Early life and education ==
Alexander Lewis spent the early years of his life in Hampstead, London, initially observing his opera-singer parents before eventually joining the St Albans Cathedral Choir at the age of seven. His father, the baritone Michael Lewis, is an opera singer and concert performer and his mother Patricia Price is a mezzo-soprano from Wales and the retired head of vocal studies and opera at the Western Australian Academy of Performing Arts. His late older brother, Ben Lewis, was known for his portrayals of The Phantom in Andrew Lloyd Webber’s Love Never Dies and The Phantom of the Opera.

Lewis's parents used their industry contacts to fund-raise for South Warrawee Primary School in Sydney, which both Alexander and Ben attended. Richard Bonynge was generally the conductor and the performers were whoever was available at the time from the Australian Opera. The concerts continue to this day and a prize named after Lewis's parents is awarded to one of the school's music students.

After the family moved back to Australia, Lewis attended Newington College in Sydney, where he studied music and drama as well as played sport. After high school, Lewis successfully applied to study at the Western Australian Academy of Performing Arts (WAAPA) with brother Ben. Both graduated from the Music Theatre course in 2004. and Alexander was awarded the Lesley Anderson Fellowship as most outstanding student of that year.

== Career ==
In 2001, Lewis appeared in the Sydney Festival with the Australian Theatre for Young People. In 2002, he featured in the Prime Minister's Australia Day celebrations.

In the 2008 Australian production of Andrew Lloyd Webber's The Phantom of the Opera saw Lewis cast as Raoul, Vicomte de Chagny opposite Ana Marina and Anthony Warlow. Eventually Lewis was cast as the understudy for The Phantom and covered the role in Warlow's absences from late 2008 to 2009. Lewis won the Australian National Aria Competition in 2009 and followed that up with second place in the McDonald's Aria Competition and then first place in the 2010 Sir Robert Askin Fellowship.

Based in New York, and in his second year of the Lindemann Young Artist Development Program, Lewis performed in the 2011/2012 and 2012/2013 Metropolitan Opera seasons. Lewis has played numerous stage roles such as Anthony Hope in Sweeney Todd, Nemorino in L'elisir d'amore, Frederick Barrett in the musical Titanic and Vašek in The Bartered Bride in a joint production of the Metropolitan Opera and the Juilliard School conducted by James Levine.

He sang in the world premiere of Matthew Aucoin's opera Crossing in 2015.

He sang Count Danilo in Opera Australia's production of The Merry Widow opposite Danielle de Niese in 2017/2018 in Melbourne and Sydney. In 2019, Lewis performed as Tony in Francesca Zambello's production of West Side Story for Opera Australia's Handa Opera on the Harbour.

In September 2018, he took the part of Candide in a production of the operetta Candide, directed by Mitchell Butel and staged at the Sydney Opera House with the Sydney Philharmonia Choirs, Sydney Youth Orchestra, and stars from Opera Australia. Annie Aitken played Cunegonde, and Caroline O'Connor The Old Lady. Butel also played Dr Pangloss and narrated the story In May 2024, he reprised his role as Candide in a co-production by the State Theatre Company South Australia (STCSA) and State Opera South Australia in Adelaide, again under the direction of now STCSA director Mitchell Butel, and again with Aitken and O'Connor. In November 2019, he portrayed Tateh in Ragtime at the State Theatre.

== Other activities ==
Away from the stage, Lewis has appeared on Australian television in the series headLand, and has featured in fundraising events for charities such as the Royal Flying Doctor Service and the Royal Institute for Deaf and Blind Children.

== Awards and recognition ==
In 2001, Lewis was a finalist in the Australian Singing Competition's Mathy Awards.

In 2006, Lewis was the winner of Opera Foundation Australia's New York Study Award and spent six weeks studying in New York City, attending rehearsals and performances. At the end of the six-week period, Lewis was given the opportunity to perform for members of the Metropolitan Opera audition panel.

In 2007 he was a finalist in the competition Neue Stimmen in Germany.

Other awards and recognition include the Australian National Aria Competition in 2009 and the Sir Robert Askin Fellowship in 2010.
