= Niamh Perry =

Northern Irish singer

- Born: Niamh Perry; Bangor, County Down, UK
- Occupation: Singer
- Years active: 2008–present

Niamh Perry is a Northern Irish singer who is best known for playing Fleck in the Andrew Lloyd Webber musical Love Never Dies. She came to prominence when she competed as one of the finalists in the BBC talent show-themed television series I'd Do Anything in 2008.

== Early life ==
Born in Bangor, County Down, Perry attended Our Lady and St. Patrick's College, Knock.

In 2007, she achieved a Distinction in her Grade eight classical singing examination, for which she won the South Eastern Education and Library Board (SEELB) Outstanding Achievement Award for Contribution to the Arts She was a member of Music Theatre for Youth (MT4UTH) from when the company was founded in 2005 and she was also a member of the MT4UTH Showcase group, Footlighters. She performed with MT4UTH in productions of Sweet Charity, in which she played the lead role of Charity, Oliver!, Joseph and the Amazing Technicolor Dreamcoat, Guys and Dolls and West Side Story. She also sang a solo at the re-opening of the Grand Opera House in Belfast.

In February 2008, Perry took part in an NSPCC campaign encouraging adults to call the NSPCC Child Protection Helpline if they had concerns about a child's welfare.

== Singing career ==
In March 2008, Perry was announced as one of the final 12 contestants in the BBC1 programme I'd Do Anything, which premiered on 15 March 2008 and aimed to find a performer to play Nancy in a West End revival of the musical Oliver!. Perry was eliminated from the show in week eight but has since gone on to have a successful career in musical theatre.

Perry played the lead role of Belle in the musical Only the Brave, which had its world premiere at the Edinburgh Festival Fringe on 31 July 2008 at the George Square theatre and ran until 25 August. On 13 September 2008 she performed alongside fellow I'd Do Anything finalist Rachel Tucker at the Proms in the Park, held at Belfast City Hall as part of the nationwide celebration of the BBC Last Night of the Proms.

Perry was a featured vocalist with the BBC Concert Orchestra on the BBC Radio 2 programme Friday Night is Music Night in October 2008.

On 16 November 2008, Perry sang at St Paul's Cathedral in the City of London at a fundraising and awareness raising event for Save the Children. She was the joint lead vocalist with opera singer Mark Stone as they sang the premiere performance of "The Cry, a requiem for a lost child".

She appeared in pantomime at the Devonshire Park Theatre in Eastbourne, East Sussex from 12 December 2008 to 11 January 2009 in Show White and the Seven Dwarfs playing the lead role of Snow White alongside Stefan Booth.

In May 2009, Andrew Lloyd Webber revealed on an episode of 'Friday Night with Jonathan Ross' that Perry would be singing one of the roles on the Original Cast Recording for Love Never Dies, the sequel to Phantom of the Opera, describing her as "wonderful".

On Monday 15 June 2009, Niamh began playing the lead role of Sophie Sheridan in Mamma Mia! The Musical at the Prince of Wales Theatre, London, with Sally Ann Triplett as Donna.

On 19 March 2011 she was the wedding singer for the BBC Three live musical drama Frankenstein's Wedding.

In 2012, Perry gained positive reviews for her portrayal of Kim in the Boy George musical Taboo.

Perry went on to impress as Johanna Barker in Sweeney Todd: The Demon Barber of Fleet Street at the West Yorkshire Playhouse and then at Royal Exchange, Manchester.

In February 2014, it was announced that Perry had been selected to lead the cast of the revival of Andrew Lloyd Webber musical The Beautiful Game when it returned to London. She went on to receive much critical acclaim for her portrayal of Mary.

== Thomas & Friends ==
Perry was confirmed as the voice of Dash by Joel Beckford. She performed a festive Wombles classic "Wombling Merry Christmas" together with Joel Beckford, Jessie Buckley, Jon Moses and the new series narrator Laura Whitmore, who did the narrating interlude.

== Filmography ==
=== Television ===
Year	Title	Role	Notes
2008	I'd Do Anything	Herself	
2008	BBC Last Night of the Proms	Herself	
2010	Frankenstein's Wedding	The Wedding Singer	
2013	Thomas & Friends	Dash	Voice

=== Theatre Credits ===
Year	Title	Role	Theatre	Location
2005	Oliver!	Ensemble	MT4UTH	London
2006	Joseph and the Amazing Technicolor Dreamcoat	Ensemble	MT4UTH	London
2006	Guys & Dolls	Ensemble	MT4UTH	London
2007	West Side Story	Ensemble	MT4UTH	London
2007	Sweet Charity	Charity	MT4UTH	London
2008	Only The Brave	Belle	George Square Theatre	Edinburgh Fringe Festival
2008-09	Snow White and the Seven Dwarfs	Snow White	Devonshire Park Theatre	Eastbourne
2009	Love Never Dies	Fleck	Adelphi Theatre	West End
2009-10	Mamma Mia	Sophie Sheridan	Prince of Wales Theatre	West End
2010-11	Lee Mead Concert Tour	Herself	—N/a	UK National Tour
2011-12	The Little Prince Musical	The Little Prince	Lyric Theatre	Belfast
2012	A Song Cycle for Soho	Herself	Soho Theatre	Off-West End
2012	Taboo	Kim	Brixton Clubhouse	Off-West End
2013	Sweeney Todd: The Demon Barber of Fleet Street	Johanna	West Yorkshire Playhouse / Royal Exchange	West Yorkshire / Manchester
2014	The Beautiful Game	Mary	The Union Theatre	London
2014-16	Mamma Mia	Sophie Sheridan	—N/a	International Tour
2017	Once	Girl	Gaiety Theatre	Dublin
2018	Whisper House	Female Ghost	The Other Palace	Off-West End
2019	Exposure	Pandora	St James's Theatre	Off-West End
2022	Harry Potter and the Cursed Child	Delphini Diggory	Palace Theatre	West End
2026	Kimberly Akimbo	Pattie Levaco	Hampstead Theatre	Off-West End
