= Celinde Schoenmaker =

Dutch singer and actress (born 1989)

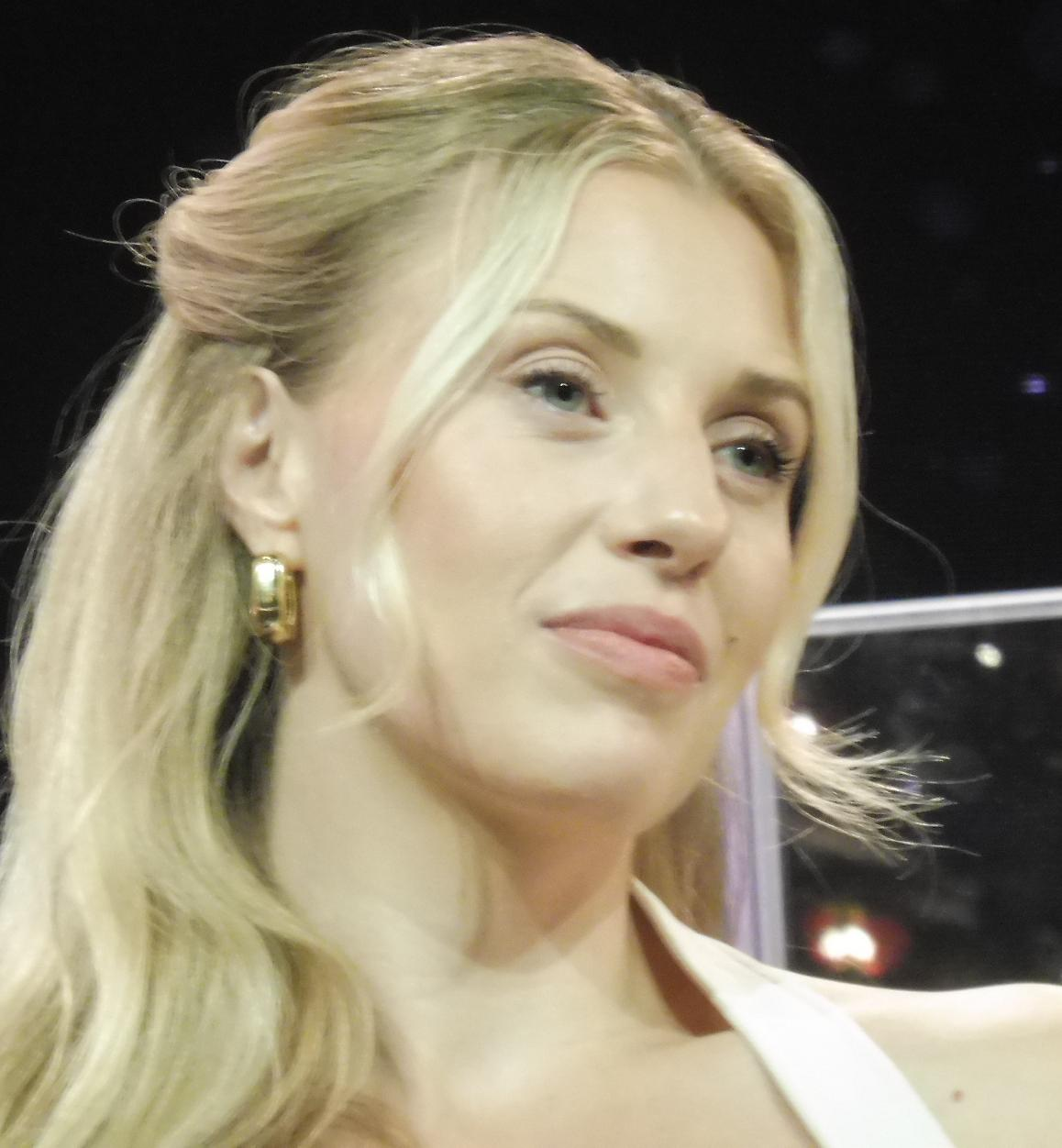
- Celinde Schoenmaker, 2025

Background information
- Born: 15 January 1989 (age 37); Dordrecht, South Holland, Netherlands
- Occupations: Actress, singer
- Years active: 1997–present
- Spouse: Richard Fleeshman (m. 2026)

Celinde Schoenmaker (born 15 January 1989) is a Dutch actress and singer.

She is known for appearing as Renate Blauel in Rocketman, Fantine in the West End production of the musical Les Misérables, and Christine Daaé in the West End production of The Phantom of the Opera during their 30th anniversary. In 2024/2025 she performed the role of Sarah Brown in Guys and Dolls at London's Bridge Theatre.

== Early life and education ==
Born in Dordrecht, Netherlands, Schoenmaker lived during her childhood also in Papendrecht, Etten-Leur, and Miami, Florida.

After obtaining her high school diploma at the municipal gymnasium in Breda (Stedelijk Gymnasium Breda), Schoenmaker studied Liberal Arts for a year at Oxford Brookes University. Once back in the Netherlands, she was admitted to the Fontys School of Fine and Performing Arts in Tilburg. In April 2012 she completed the music course summa cum laude. In June of that year she was awarded the Jacques de Leeuw Prize as the most talented student of executive education in the Netherlands. This award is designed to give young, talented artists the opportunity to develop themselves.

== Career ==
=== Musical theatre ===
Schoenmaker moved to London after being cast in the role of Fantine for her West End debut on 14 January 2013 in Les Misérables, replacing Sierra Boggess. On 7 September 2015, Schoenmaker returned to West End in Andrew Lloyd Webber's The Phantom of the Opera as the female lead of Christine Daaé. On 27 September 2016, Schoenmaker performed with Ben Forster in the show's 30th anniversary performance. In 2016, she astonished shoppers in Covent Garden by supporting a local busker (Steven Barry) by singing "All I Ask of You" with him. Schoenmaker was cast as Jenny Lind in the 2017 off-West End production of Barnum which opened on 5 December at the Menier Chocolate Factory.

In 2019 Schoenmaker played the role of Franca Naccarelli in Light in the Piazza at Royal Festival Hall, London, and at Dorothy Chandler Pavilion for Los Angeles Opera, a production led by Renée Fleming. In 2020 she performed the two-hander Marry Me A Little in Cirencester, England. She has appeared in concerts of Camelot as Nimue, Jesus Christ Superstar as Mary, Doctor Zhivago as Lara, and as Christine in 2023 at Theatre Royal, Drury Lane in Love Never Dies opposite Norm Lewis. She starred in London's Bridge Theatre revival of Guys and Dolls as Sarah Brown. Schoenmaker was the headline act for the 2025 Bravo Cruise of Performing Arts and appeared at the 2026 BBC Proms in the Celebrating Disney: The Music of Menken prom. She’s set to reprise her Love Never Dies performance for an additional West End concert run in October 2026.

=== Film / TV ===
In 2019, she appeared as Renate Blauel in the Elton John biopic Rocketman. In 2020 she took on the role of Vanessa in the Dutch TV series Red Light. In 2021 she played the role of Maaike van de Berg in Hong Kong Lovestory, released as The Modelizer. In 2021 she played the role of Saskia in the English TV series Our House.

== Personal life ==
Schoenmaker got engaged to British actor and singer, Richard Fleeshman, in 2022. Their daughter was born in November 2024. The couple married in April 2026.

== Filmography ==
- 2019: Rocketman – Renate Blauel
- 2020: Red Light – Vanessa
- 2021: Our House – Saskia
- 2022: Matriach – Katrin
- 2023: Hong Kong Lovestory/The Modelizer – Maaike van de Berg
- 2026: Crook Haven (TV show)
