= Meghan Picerno =

American theater actress and opera singer

- Education: Manhattan School of Music
- Occupations: Singer; actress
- Website: https://www.meghanpicerno.com/

Meghan Picerno is an American theatre actress and coloratura soprano opera and musical theater singer. She is best known for her five-year history of playing the role of Christine Daaé in several productions, including the U.S. Premiere and 1st National Tour of Love Never Dies, and the world tour and Broadway production of The Phantom of the Opera.

== Education ==
Picerno studied music at Illinois Wesleyan University. She later graduated from Manhattan School of Music with a M.M. in voice. She is also an alumnus of the Martina Arroyo foundation.

== Career ==
Picerno began her career in the opera world. In 2012, she took part in the "I Sing Beijing" program, performing at the National Center for the Performing Arts in the PRC, and appeared on a popular China Central Television program, performing George Gershwin's It Ain't Necessarily So, alongside American Tenor Jamez McCorkle and Dutch-Canadian Tenor Lucas van Lierop. In 2015, she was a quarterfinalist in Plácido Domingo's Operalia International Vocal Competition. She has also performed La fée from Massenet's Cendrillon in Montreal, and the Queen of the Night in Mozart's Die Zauberflöte at Lincoln Center and Carnegie Hall. Picerno garnered the top prize at the Arkadi International Vocal Competition, at New York Lyric Opera.

Picerno's first crossover into musical theatre was New York City Opera's 2017 production of Leonard Bernstein's Candide, which was directed by Hal Prince. She played Cunégonde in his production. Anthony Tommasini writing on this staging for the New York Times said of her "The bright-voiced soprano Meghan Picerno is an exuberant Cunegonde, the daughter of a Westphalian baron."

Hal Prince and his team then cast Picerno as Christine Daaé in the U.S. Premiere and First National Tour of Andrew Lloyd Webber's Love Never Dies, the sequel to the hit and longest-running stage musical The Phantom of the Opera. In 2019, she reprised the role in the second world tour of The Phantom of the Opera. Later in the year, she transferred to the New York production to make her Broadway debut in the role. After reopening The Phantom of the Opera on Broadway after the COVID-19 pandemic shutdown, Picerno played her final show as Christine Daaé on January 23, 2022, ending her five-year run as the character. Dianna Wray writing in Houstonia magazine on the musical said of the singer's performance in the production ..."Piecerno provides one of the few truly breathtaking moments in the show as her glorious soprano easily filled the concert hall during the title song".

== Performance credits ==
Year(s)	Production	Role	Location	Category
2017	Candide	Cunégonde	Jazz At Lincoln Center's Rose Theater	Off-Broadway
2017	Berlin to Broadway with Kurt Weill: A Musical Voyage	Performer	York Theatre Company	Off-Broadway Revival
2017	The Dreyfus Affair	Lucie Dreyfus	BAM Fisher	Off-Broadway
2017	Love Never Dies	Christine Daaé		U.S. Tour
2019-22	The Phantom of the Opera	Christine Daaé	Theatre at Solaire (Manila) Marina Bay Sands Theatre (Singapore) Istana Budaya (Kuala Lumpur) Israeli Opera (Tel Aviv)	World Tour
2019-22	The Phantom of the Opera	Christine Daaé	Majestic Theatre	Broadway
