= Zhang Liping =

Chinese-Canadian soprano (born 1965)

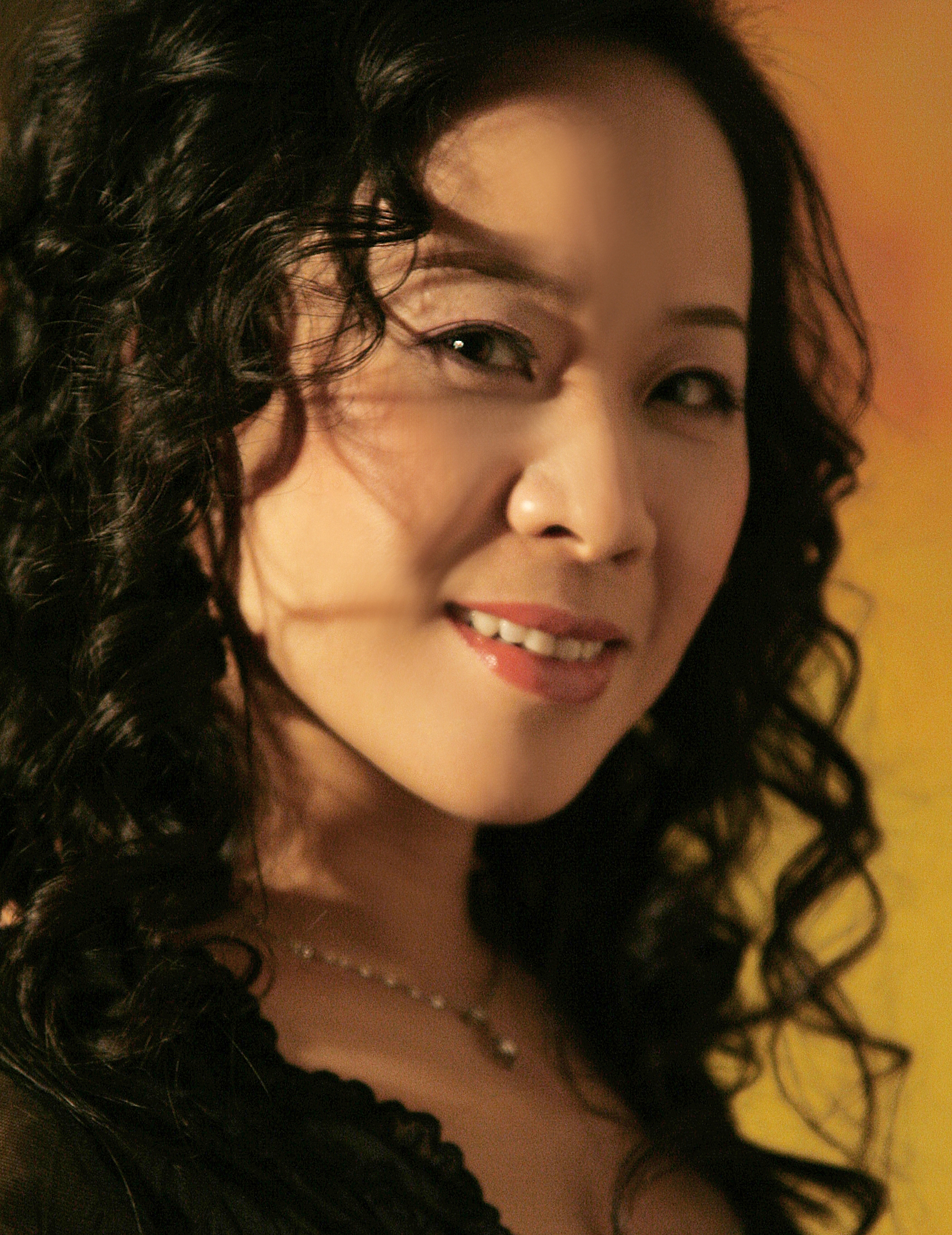
Zhang Liping in 2009

Zhang Liping (simplified Chinese: 张立萍; traditional Chinese: 張立萍; born 1965) is a Chinese soprano, who has sung leading roles in the opera houses of both Europe and North America. She is particularly known for her portrayal of Madama Butterfly.

== Background ==
Zhang Liping was born in Wuhan, Hubei (about 650 miles south-west of Beijing) and is the daughter of a classical musician and a dancer. She entered the Wuhan Conservatoire to study voice. As a young student, she was selected to sing with Plácido Domingo in Tian'anmen Square. She then moved to Vancouver to study with Canadian mezzo-soprano Phyllis Mailing at the Vancouver Academy of Music. She later joined Vancouver Opera's Young Artist Program and sang throughout Canada in roles such as Mimi (La bohème), Leila (Les pêcheurs de perles), Liu (Turandot), Marguerite (Faust) and Lucia (Lucia di Lammermoor). In 1997, she moved to London.

Zhang has sung Lucia Ashton with the Royal Opera Covent Garden and the Deutsche Oper Berlin and also Gilda in Verdi's Rigoletto at the Den Norske Opera and the Teatro Regio di Parma.

In 2002, Zhang debuted as Liu (in Turandot) at Covent Garden.

== Critical reception ==
David Cairns of The Times wrote that Zhang sang with "exceptional eloquence and intensity".

David Fingleton, writing in the British newspaper, the Sunday Express, commented that Zhang gave a "clearly-drawn, thoughtful performance" which was a "tour-de-force".

The Detroit News wrote Zhang is "a Butterfly who does more than carry the show; she represents the world standard."

Malcolm Hayes, writing in The Sunday Telegraph, remarked that: "The biggest round of applause went to the Liu of Zhang Liping, whose sumptuous soprano had us hanging on her every note." Geoff Brown wrote in The Times, "With Li Ping Zhang's lovelorn Liu, though, sweet drama and music came rolled into one. Her part's vocal perils left her unscathed; each word struck home in the heart in a way no one else's ever did."

== Recordings ==
Liping Zhang's debut disc was released by EMI Classics. The recording features arias by Verdi, Puccini, Bellini, and Donizetti.

== Sources ==
- Los Angeles Opera, Artist biography: Liping Zhang
- Ng, David, A thoroughly cosmopolitan 'Butterfly': Personable Liping Zhang is nothing like the submissive heroine she often portrays, Los Angeles Times, October 1, 2008
- Varty, Alexander, Frequent Flier; Opera Singer Liping Zhang Recalls The Highs And Lows Of Her Trademark Role As Madama Butterfly, The Georgia Straight, November 18, 2004
