= Ben Lewis (Australian actor) =

Australian actor and singer (1979–2025)

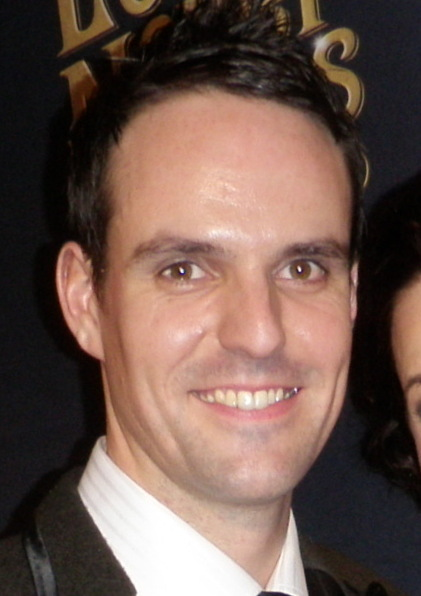
- Lewis in 2011
- Born: 28 September 1979; London, England
- Died: 6 October 2025 (aged 46)
- Education: Newington College; Western Australian Academy of Performing Arts
- Occupations: Actor, singer
- Years active: 2001–2023
- Known for: Love Never Dies; The Phantom of the Opera
- Spouse: Melle Stewart
- Relatives: Alexander Lewis (brother)

Ben Lewis (28 September 1979 – 6 October 2025) was an English-born Australian actor and baritenor singer. His most well-known role was as the Phantom of the Opera in the original Australian production of Andrew Lloyd Webber's Love Never Dies. In 2017 and 2018 he reprised the role in Lloyd Webber's The Phantom of the Opera in the original West End theatre production. His other notable roles included Chad and Frank Farmer in the UK tours of Love Me Tender and The Bodyguard, as well as Larry in the 2018 West End revival of Company.

== Early life ==
Lewis was born in London to a theatrical family. His father, Michael Lewis, is an opera singer and his mother, Patricia Price, was also an opera singer and is retired as head of vocal studies and opera at the Western Australian Academy of Performing Arts. His brother, Alexander Lewis, is an opera singer and actor who completed three years as a young artist at New York's Metropolitan Opera. During his childhood, his family went back and forth between England and the North Shore of Sydney, Australia.

== Education ==
After initially studying in England, Lewis graduated from Newington College in Sydney. He then undertook an arts degree at the University of Sydney but dropped out after three and a half years. He was introduced to the drama society while at the university and later enrolled at the Australian Theatre for Young People, where he was awarded a Lendlease scholarship to study voice at the Royal College of Music in London. Upon returning to Australia, he applied to study at the Western Australian Academy of Performing Arts (WAAPA) with his brother and both were successful. It was during his time at WAAPA that he met his wife, actress Melle Stewart. Australian performer Tony Sheldon was a visiting director during his time at WAAPA, and Lewis later credited Sheldon with helping him through his student years.

== Personal life ==
Lewis was married to Australian actress Melle Stewart and was her primary care-giver after she had a stroke in 2021.

In July 2025, it was publicly revealed that Lewis had been diagnosed with a fast-spreading bowel cancer in February 2024 that became incurable. His brother, Alexander, launched a GoFundMe campaign for him the same month.

Lewis died from bowel cancer on 6 October 2025 at the age of 46. His friend Todd Woodbridge released a statement about his death on Instagram.

== Career ==
=== Theatre credits ===
Year	Title	Character	Company
2005	The Windows Project	-	Darlinghurst Theatre, Sydney
2005	Odyssey	-	The Malthouse/Black Swan Theatre Company
2006	Urinetown	-	Sydney Theatre Company
2006–2007	Priscilla, Queen of the Desert	Frank	Lyric Theatre, Star City Casino, Sydney
2007	Spamalot	Sir Dennis Galahad / Prince Herbert's Father / Black Knight	Her Majesty's Theatre, Melbourne
2009	A Little Night Music	Count Carl-Magnus Malcolm	Opera House, Sydney
2009	Metro Street	Chris Barnes	The Production Company
2010	A Midsummer Night's Dream	Lysander / Snug / Cobweb	WildRumpus
2011–2012	Love Never Dies	The Phantom of the Opera	Really Useful Group
2013	Candide	Governor / Vanderdendur	Menier Chocolate Factory
2014	Thérèse Raquin	Laurent	Finborough Theatre
2014	Forbidden Broadway	various characters	Menier Chocolate Factory and Vaudeville Theatre
2015	Devilish!	Nick Brimstone	Tristan Bates Theatre
2015	Love Me Tender	Chad	UK tour
2016	Annie Get Your Gun	Frank Butler	Crubicle, Sheffield
2017–2018	The Phantom of the Opera	The Phantom of the Opera	Her Majesty's Theatre, West End
2018–2019	Company	Larry	Gielgud Theatre, West End
2019–2020	The Bodyguard	Frank Farmer	UK, Ireland & Japan tour

=== Film and television credits ===
Year	Series/Film/Event	Character	Episode	Company
2001	McLeod's Daughters	Troy O'Rouke	Who's a Big Girl Now?	Channel Nine Australia
2011	Carols By Candlelight	Himself	-	Nine Network
2012	Love Never Dies	The Phantom / Mr. Y	-	Universal Pictures
2012	Side By Side by Sondheim	Himself	-	Theatre Royal
2013	Doctors	Ned Bick	Bleeding Hearts	BBC 1
2016	Cyanide and Happiness Shorts	Guard	The Execution	YouTube
2020	EastEnders	Iain	6150	BBC 1

== Awards and nominations ==
In 2012, Lewis received a nomination for a Helpmann Award and won a Judith Johnson Award for Best Actor in Leading Role in a Musical at the 2012 Sydney Theatre Awards for his role as the Phantom in Love Never Dies.
