= Christine Daaé =

Fictional character

- The Phantom of the Opera character
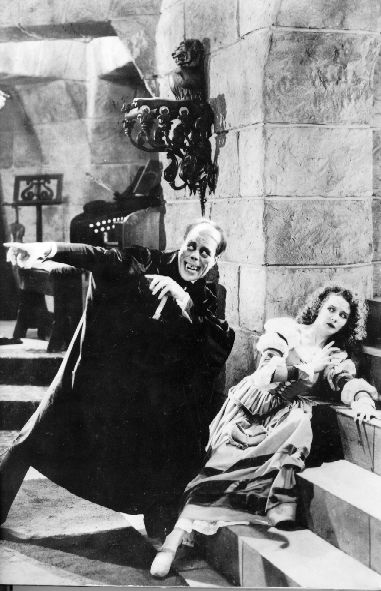
- Christine Daaé (Mary Philbin) in the 1925 film The Phantom of the Opera, alongside Erik, The Phantom of the Opera (Lon Chaney).
- First appearance: The Phantom of the Opera (1909)
- Created by: Gaston Leroux

In-universe information
- Occupation: Opera Singer
- Family: Madame Valérius (adoptive mother)
- Spouse: Viscount Raoul de Chagny
- Nationality: Swedish

Christine Daaé is a fictional character and the female protagonist of Gaston Leroux's 1910 novel The Phantom of the Opera and of the various adaptations of the work. Erik, the Phantom of the Opera and Viscount Raoul de Chagny both fall in love with her.

== Basis ==
Towards the end of his life, Leroux claimed the character was based on a real opera singer "whose real name I hid under that of Christine Daaé". It is likely he was referring to the Swedish singer Christina Nilsson (1843–1921) (sometimes known as "Christine Nilsson"), whose real life heavily reflects details in the fictitious Christine Daaé's history. Nilsson, like the fictional Daaé, was born in rural Sweden, and both were discovered by a well-to-do patron performing in a Swedish marketplace: Nilsson singing along to her brother's violin playing in Ljungby, Daaé singing along to her father's violin playing in (fictitious) Ljimby. Both were taken under the protection of a family named "Valerius" in Gothenburg, and both were brought to Paris by their respective patrons for operatic training. Even the rivalry between the youthful and inexperienced Christine Daaé and the seasoned veteran diva Mme Carlotta, and specifically the replacement of Carlotta with Daaé in the role of Marguerite in Gounod's Faust, loosely reflects the public competition between Christina Nilsson and the older Caroline Miolan-Carvalho over the role at the Paris Opera in 1868–1869, even to the point of using ideas and language from contemporary reviews of Nilsson's performances.

== Character history ==
=== Biography ===
Christine Daaé was born in a town near Uppsala, Sweden. Her mother died when she was six years old. Raised by her father, they travelled through rural Sweden, wandering from fair to fair, where he played the violin and she sang. They were discovered at one of these fairs by Professor Valérius, who took them to Gothenburg and then to Paris, providing for Christine's education.

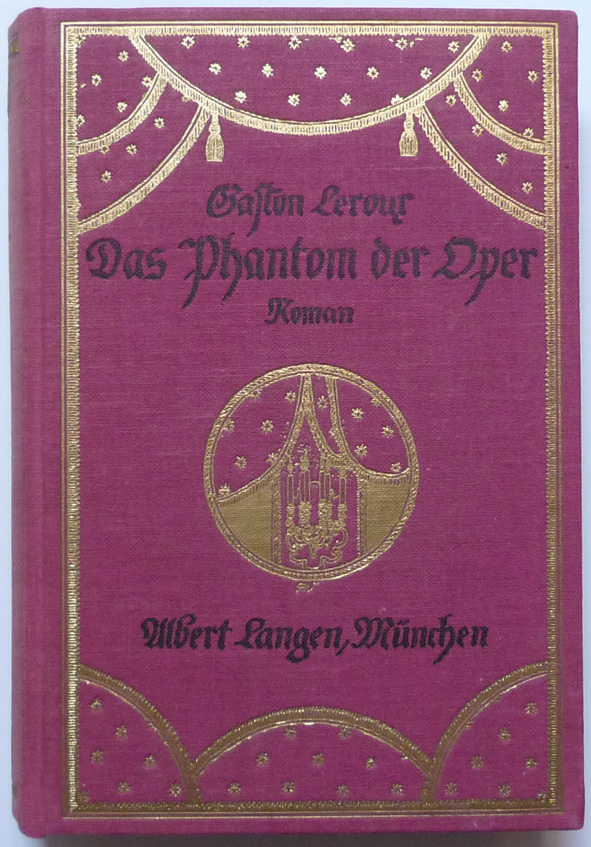
Das Phantom der Oper, Dt. EA 1912, Albert Langen, München

Christine was extremely close to her father, who told her Scandinavian fairy-tales; the tale of the "Angel of Music" was her favorite. Christine entered the Paris Conservatoire and trained for four years to become an opera singer to please her father and Mamma Valérius, the bedridden wife of the late Professor. However, by the end of the four years, she had lost her passion for singing and the music.

When Christine arrived at the Opéra Garnier, she was described as "sounding like a rusty hinge", but one person found the beauty hidden in her voice. When Erik, the Phantom of the Opera began to tutor her, he told her that he was the "Angel of Music" of whom her father had spoken. She believed him, and he inspired her soul back into her voice. Having been singing small roles with the Opera for some months without making much impression on audiences, Christine had a spectacular success at a gala at the opera in place of the singer Carlotta, who had fallen ill. Christine's singing was described as "seraphic".

Christine became torn between her loyalty and sympathy for her mentor, Erik, and her love for her childhood friend Viscount Raoul de Chagny.

In the Lofficier translation of the novel, Christine's age is given as 15 years old. However, this is a mistranslation of a passage that says her heart was "as pure as that of a 15-year-old". The evidence of Christine's childhood friendship with Raoul, and her studies at the Paris Conservatoire, put her age at 21 years old.

== Andrew Lloyd Webber's musical The Phantom of the Opera ==
Christine is a chorus / ballet girl, who becomes the object of obsession, passion and love for the mysterious Phantom of the Opera. He becomes her mentor, and with his help, she is chosen to replace the company's prima donna, Carlotta. When she falls in love with her childhood sweetheart, Raoul, the Phantom kidnaps Christine in a jealous rage and drags her down to his lair. She is forced to choose between the Phantom and Raoul, but her compassion for the Phantom moves him to free them both and allow them to flee. In the original West End and Broadway productions, she was portrayed by Sarah Brightman.

=== 2004 film ===
The film version of the musical follows the musical's script closely, but Christine's age is reduced. Her gravemark says that she was born in 1854, and the beginning of the movie shows the setting as 1870, making her about 16 years old when the events of the movie take place.

=== Father's name ===
In the novel and the Andrew Lloyd Webber musical, Christine's father's first name is never revealed. In the novel, he is simply referred to as "Daddy" or "Daddy Daaé." In the 2004 movie, he is called Gustave, and in Sarah Brightman's music video version of "Wishing You Were Somehow Here Again", his name is Charles.

== Films ==
The novel has been adapted several times. The first film iteration was produced in Germany in 1915, with Nils Chrisander (1884–1947) as the Phantom and Aud Egede-Nissen (1893–1974) as Christine. Many critics consider the film of 1925 by Carl Laemmle's Universal Pictures as the most successful. The role of the Phantom played here by Lon Chaney. The same studio tried in 1943 with a sound film of Arthur Lubin to follow this success. The film used to a large extent the still existing scenes of the silent film. Claude Rains played the Phantom.

In 1960, a Spanish society turned a very free adaptation of the subject under the title El Fantasma de la Operetta . In 1962, British production company Hammer Films focused on the horror genre.

Another adaptation was produced in 1974 by 20th Century Fox, who moved the event to New York and significantly altered the story to be more Faustian. This film was released as Phantom of the Paradise, with Jessica Harper in the Christine-esque role of Phoenix, and William Finley as the eponymous Phantom.

The 1989 version, Jill Schoelen played Christine opposite Robert Englund in the title role.

In 1998, Italian horror film director Dario Argento cast his daughter Asia as Christine.

In 2004, Joel Schumacher produced a film version inspired by the musical of Andrew Lloyd Webber. This iteration starred Gerard Butler and Emmy Rossum as the Phantom and Christine. Originally, there was already a filming based on the musical in the early 1990s, with Michael Crawford and Sarah Brightman reprising their roles from the stage production as the Phantom and Christine. Brightman was married to Lloyd Webber at the time, but shortly before the planned pre-production the marriage was dissolved and the filming was cancelled.

=== Popular movies ===
Year	Title	Genre	Christine Daaé
1915	The Phantom of the Opera	Silent drama	Aud Egede-Nissen
1925	The Phantom of the Opera	Horror	Mary Philbin
1937	Ye ban ge sheng	Horror	Hu Ping
1943	Phantom of the Opera	Horror, music	Susanna Foster
1962	The Riddle of the Eerie Mask	Horror	Heather Sears
1983	The Phantom of Budapest	Horror	Jane Seymour
1987	The Phantom of the Opera	Horror Animation	Collette Proctor
1989	The Phantom of the Opera	Horror	Jill Schoelen
1990	The Phantom of the Opera	Drama Miniseries	Teri Polo
1998	The Phantom of the Opera	Horror	Asia Argento
2004	The Phantom of the Opera	Musical	Emmy Rossum

=== Loose Adaptations ===
year	title	original title	Director	title role
1974	The Phantom of Hollywood	The Phantom of Hollywood	Gene Levitt	Jack Cassidy
1974	Phantom of the Paradise	Phantom of the Paradise	Brian De Palma	William Finley
1989	Phantom of the Mall: Eric's Revenge	Phantom of the Mall: Eric's Revenge	Richard Friedman	Derek Rydall
1989	Phantom of the Ritz	Phantom of the Ritz	Allen Plone	Joshua Sussman

== Actresses ==
The first actress to portray Christine Daaé was Aud Egede-Nissen in the 1916 German silent version by Ernst Matray, Das Gespenst im Opernhaus or Das Phantom der Oper.

- Mary Philbin played Christine in the 1925 American silent version by Rupert Julian, The Phantom of the Opera.
- Susanna Foster played Christine DuBois in the 1943 Technicolor version, Phantom of the Opera.
- Heather Sears played Christine Charles in the 1962 version of The Phantom of the Opera.
- Jane Seymour played Christine in the 1983 TV movie version.
- Christina Collier played her in Ken Hill's camp-classical musical version in 1984.
- Glory Crampton originated the role in the much revived Maury Yeston and Arthur Kopit 1990 musical Phantom.
- Jill Schoelen played Christine Day in Dwight H. Little's 1989 film version.
- Asia Argento played her in the 1998 film.
- Claudia Cota played her twice in The Phantom of the Opera (musical 2000) by Morris Gilbert in Mexico and Player her on Phantom of the Opera (musical 2009) in Argentina by Harold Prince.
- Teri Polo took the role in the 1990 television miniseries version.
- American Janet Marie Chvatal performed the role in 1991–1992 in the German version of Das Phantom der Oper in Vienna, Austria.

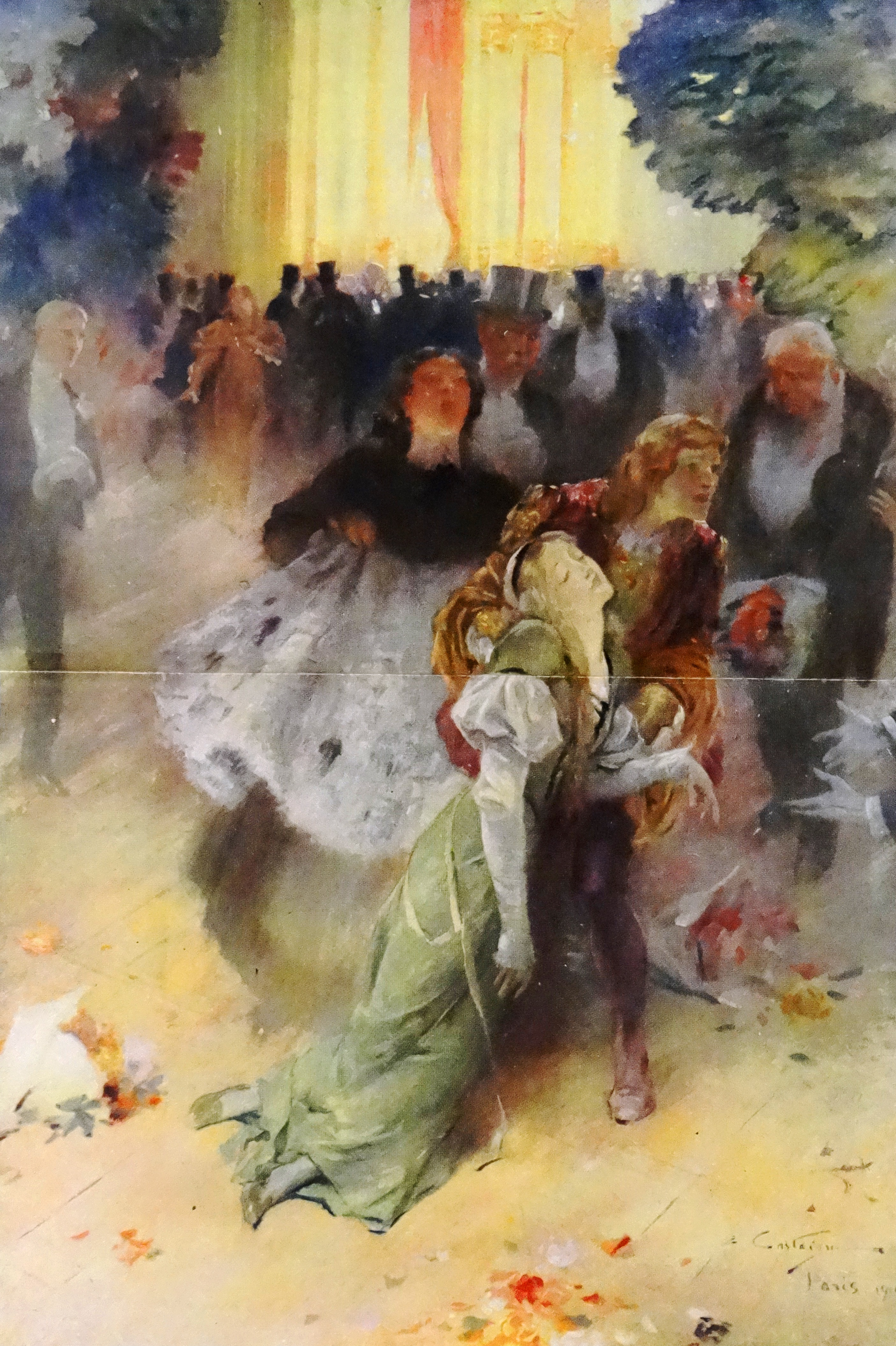
André Castaigne - The Phantom of the Opera

=== Lloyd Webber musical actresses ===
- Sarah Brightman debuted the role in the 1986 Andrew Lloyd Webber musical on Broadway and in the West End
- Patti Cohenour debuted the role in the 1986 Broadway production, alternating with Sarah Brightman. Cohenour was thus the first American Christine and went on to reprise the role for the Canadian production.
- Claire Moore was Brightman's alternate in the West End production and took over the role when she left.
- Lee Hye kyong and Kim Soo Hyun played Christine debuted the role Andrew Lloyd Webber musical, Korean Production in Seoul year 2001.
- Rebecca Caine debuted the role in the Canadian production (1989) and featured on the Canadian Cast album.
- Marina Prior originated the role in the Australian production.
- Rebecca Luker was the original understudy in the Broadway production and later took over the role and played opposite Steve Barton and Cris Groenendaal as the Phantom.
- Lisa Vroman was a principal Christine on Broadway and the first US tour and also served as the alternate Christine in the third US tour
- Josie Walker was the alternate in the first UK tour.
- Emmy Rossum played her in the 2004 film version of the Lloyd Webber musical.
- Sierra Boggess first played Christine in the 2006 version of the Lloyd Webber musical, Phantom – The Las Vegas Spectacular. In 2010 she originated the role in Lloyd Webber's sequel, Love Never Dies. She next played Christine in the 25th Anniversary concert, The Phantom of the Opera at the Royal Albert Hall, in 2011, on Broadway in 2013 and 2014, and in Paris to celebrate the show's 30th anniversary in 2016.
- Elizabeth Loyacano was Boggess's alternate in the Las Vegas production
- Katie Hall played Christine in the 25th anniversary UK tour
- Samantha Hill served as alternate for the role during Boggess' tenure, and took over the lead on Broadway from 2012 to 2013.
- Kimilee Bryant played the role in the Lloyd Webber musical on Broadway (1994–95; 1998; 2009–2012 occasionally) and in the Swiss (in German; 1995–96), U.S. National Tour (1996–98) and Toronto (1999) productions.
- Gina Beck played the role in the Lloyd Webber musical in London.
- Sofia Escobar played the role of Christine Daaé, in The Phantom of the Opera at Her Majesty's Theatre in London, from 2010 to 2013.
- Jennifer Hope Wills played Christine in the Lloyd Webber musical on Broadway and on a Canadian tour of the musical.
- Julia Udine played Christine on Broadway in the Lloyd Webber musical from 2014 to 2016, after playing the role in the North American tour in 2013–2014.
- Ali Ewoldt played Christine on Broadway in the Andrew Lloyd Webber musical from 2016 to November 2018. She is the first Asian-American actress to be cast in the lead role.
- Anna O'Byrne played Christine in the Australian productions of Phantom of the Opera and Love Never Dies and reprised her role in the West End production of Phantom
- Kaley Ann Voorhees played Christine in the Lloyd Webber musical on Broadway from November 2018 to October 2019.
- Meghan Picerno played Christine in The Phantom of the Opera on Broadway from October 2019 to January 2022 and in the 2019 world tour.
- Kelly Mathieson played Christine at the original theatre, Her Majesty's Theatre in London's West End from 2017 until the closing of the original production in 2020.
- Holly-Anne Hull played Christine on the UK and Ireland tour 2020 for a mere 13 performances before the COVID-19 pandemic shut down the tour. She then transferred to the West End in Her Majesty's Theatre as the alternate Christine with performances commenced then from 27 July 2021. In January 2023 she took over the role as the principal actress and left the cast in July that same year.
- Lucy St Louis began playing Christine in Her Majesty's Theatre with performances commencing from 27 July 2021.
- Emilie Kouatchou was Christine on Broadway from her first performance on October 27, 2021, to the final Broadway performance on April 16, 2023. She is the first Black actress to portray the role in the Broadway production.
- Celinde Schoenmaker played Christine in The Phantom of the Opera in the West End and Greece and is set to reprise her role in a concert version of Love Never Dies in 2023.
- Lily Kerhoas took over the role of Christine on the West End in July 2023.
