= Les Misérables (musical) =

Musical based on Victor Hugo's novel of the same name

- Music: Claude-Michel Schönberg
- Lyrics: Herbert Kretzmer
- Original text: Alain Boublil; Jean-Marc Natel
- Book: Alain Boublil; Claude-Michel Schönberg
- Basis: Les Misérables by Victor Hugo
- Premiere: 24 September 1980: Palais des Sports, Paris
- Productions: Multiple international productions
- Awards: Tony Award for Best Musical; Tony Award for Best Book of a Musical; Tony Award for Best Original Score; Laurence Olivier Award for Most Popular Show; Drama Desk Award for Outstanding Musical; Drama Desk Award for Outstanding Music; Helpmann Award for Best Musical

Les Misérables (/leɪ ˌmɪzəˈrɑːb(əl), -blə/, French: [le mizeʁabl]), colloquially known as Les Mis or Les Miz (/leɪ ˈmɪz/), is a sung-through musical based on the 1862 novel by Victor Hugo. It is one of the most popular and highest-grossing stage musicals of all time. Set in early 19th-century France, Les Misérables tells the story of Jean Valjean, a French convict, and his journey of redemption. After stealing a loaf of bread for his sister's starving child, Valjean is imprisoned for 19 years and released in 1815. When a bishop inspires him with a tremendous act of mercy, Valjean breaks his parole, changes his name and starts his life anew. He becomes wealthy and adopts an orphan, Cosette. A police inspector named Javert pursues Valjean over the decades in a single-minded quest for "justice." The plot leads the characters to Paris, where they are swept up in the events of a revolutionary period in France, as a group of young idealists attempts to overthrow the government from a street barricade.

The musical was conceived in the late 1970s by French librettist Alain Boublil, and the original French work features music by Claude-Michel Schönberg, lyrics by Boublil and Jean-Marc Natel, and a book by Boublil and Schönberg. The show was recorded as a concept album, which was released in 1980, and then presented on stage for four months at the Palais des Sports. In 1983 it was adapted into an English-language version by producer Cameron Mackintosh and Royal Shakespeare Company directors Trevor Nunn and John Caird. This version, expanded and reorganized from the original, opened in London in 1985, and despite mixed reviews, met with great success with audiences. Les Miserables has been running in London continuously since then, making it the longest-running musical in West End history and the second longest-running musical in the world after the original off-Broadway run of The Fantasticks. Many long-running revivals followed on Broadway and around the world. A film adaptation was released in 2012.

== Background ==
Alain Boublil's initial idea to adapt Victor Hugo's novel into a musical came while at a performance of the musical Oliver! in London:

As soon as the Artful Dodger came onstage, Gavroche came to mind. It was like a blow to the solar plexus. I started seeing all the characters of Victor Hugo's Les Misérables—Valjean, Javert, Gavroche, Cosette, Marius, and Éponine—in my mind's eye, laughing, crying, and singing onstage.

He shared the idea with his collaborator, the French composer Claude-Michel Schönberg, and the two developed a rough synopsis and analysis of each character's mental and emotional state, as well as that of an audience. Schönberg then began work on the music, while Boublil started writing the text. According to Boublil, "I [began] work on the words ... after myself deciding on the subject and title of every song—in collaboration with my friend, poet Jean-Marc Natel." Two years later, a two-hour demo tape of Schönberg accompanying himself on the piano and singing every role was completed. An album of this collaboration was recorded at CTS Studios in Wembley and was released in 1980, selling 260,000 copies.

The Les Misérables concept album was released in French in 1980. It starred Maurice Barrier as Jean Valjean, with Jacques Mercier as Javert, Rose Laurens as Fantine, Yvan Dautin and Marie-France Roussel as the Thénardiers, Richard Dewitte as Marius, Fabienne Guyon as Cosette, Marie-France Dufour as Éponine, Michel Sardou as Enjolras, Schönberg as Courfeyrac and Salvatore Adamo as Combeferre. The first stage adaptation was presented at the Palais des Sports in September of that year with many of the same cast, including Barrier, Laurens, Dautin, Roussel, and Guyon; Jean Vallée played Javert.

In 1983, about six months after producer Cameron Mackintosh had opened Cats on Broadway, he received a copy of the French concept album from director Peter Farago. Farago had asked Mackintosh to produce an English-language version of the show. Initially reluctant, Mackintosh eventually agreed. In conjunction with the Royal Shakespeare Company (RSC), Mackintosh assembled a production team to adapt the French musical for a British audience. After two years in development, the English-language version, translated by Herbert Kretzmer (lyrics) and Siobhan Bracke (book), and expanded with additional material by James Fenton, opened in London in October 1985 at the Barbican Centre, then the London home of the RSC. The production was shaped and directed by Trevor Nunn and John Caird, then both senior directors with the RSC. It then transferred to the West End.

== Reception and milestones ==
Critical reviews for Les Misérables were initially negative. At the opening of the London production, The Sunday Telegraph's Francis King described the musical as "a lurid Victorian melodrama produced with Victorian lavishness", and Michael Ratcliffe of The Observer considered the show "a witless and synthetic entertainment", while literary scholars condemned the project for converting classic literature into a musical. Irving Wardle of The Times dissented, calling the musical's book a bold and ingenious abridgement of Hugo's plot. Public opinion differed from the critical consensus: the box office received record orders. The three-month engagement sold out, and reviews improved. The show placed first in a BBC Radio 2 listener poll of Britain's "Number One Essential Musicals" in 2005, receiving more than forty percent of the votes. On 3 October 2010, the show celebrated its 25th anniversary with three productions running in London: the original production at the Queen's Theatre; the 25th Anniversary touring production at the Barbican Centre; and a concert at London's O2 Arena. The London production has played more than 16,000 performances and is the second longest-running musical in the world after The Fantasticks, the second longest-running West End show after The Mousetrap.

The first Broadway production opened on 12 March 1987 and ran until 18 May 2003, closing after 6,680 performances. At the time of its closing, it was the second-longest-running musical in Broadway history. The show was nominated for 12 Tony Awards, winning eight, including Best Musical and Best Original Score.

== Emblem ==
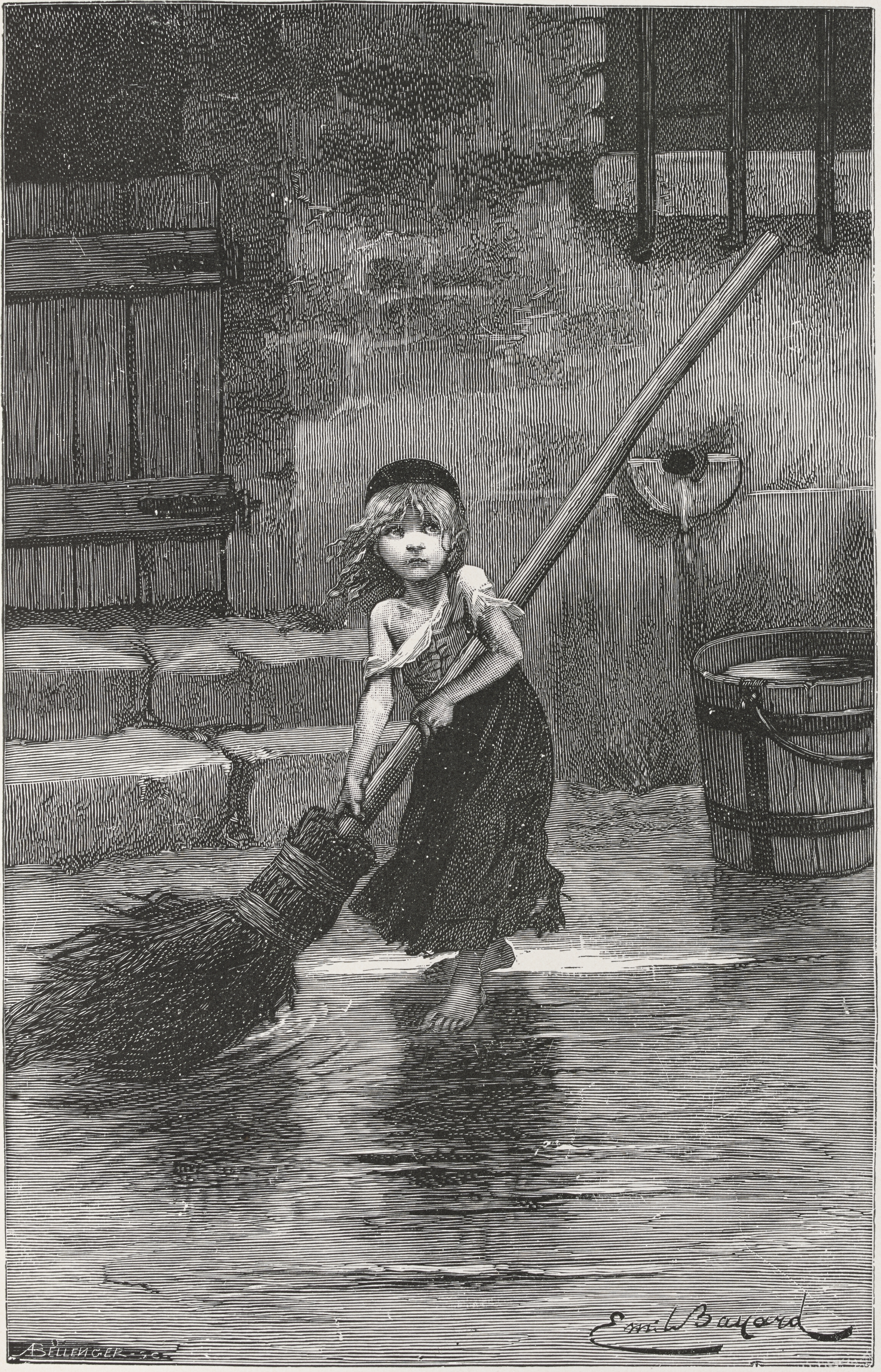
Illustration of Cosette by Émile Bayard upon which the musical's logo is modeled

The musical's emblem is a picture of the waif Cosette sweeping the Thénardiers' inn, usually cropped to a head-and-shoulders portrait, superimposed on the French flag. The image is modeled on an 1879 illustration of Cosette by Émile Bayard, which appeared in early French editions of Victor Hugo's novel.

== Synopsis ==
=== Prologue ===
In 1815 France, Jean Valjean, "Prisoner 24601", is released on parole by guard Javert after 19 years of hard labor in prison for stealing bread ("Work Song (Look Down)"). Marked by his yellow ticket of leave ("On Parole"), Valjean is shunned and cannot find decent work until the Bishop of Digne offers him shelter. Valjean steals the Bishop's silver, but the Bishop pretends to have given it to him and also gives him a pair of silver candlesticks ("Valjean Arrested, Valjean Forgiven"). Valjean vows to start an honest life ("Valjean's Soliloquy (What Have I Done?)"). He tears up his ticket, breaking parole.

=== Act I ===
By 1823, Valjean is living disguised as Monsieur Madeleine, a factory owner and the mayor of Montreuil-sur-Mer. Fantine, a single mother working at Valjean's factory, is fired after a disagreement with the lustful foreman and sinks into poverty ("At the End of the Day"; "I Dreamed a Dream"), selling her locket and hair, and becoming a prostitute ("Lovely Ladies"). When she fights back against an abusive customer, Javert, now a police inspector, arrests her. Valjean intervenes and takes her to a hospital ("Fantine's Arrest").

When Valjean rescues a man pinned by a runaway cart, Javert, who has pursued him over the years, suspects his true identity. Learning an innocent man is about to be jailed in his place, Valjean confesses ("Who Am I?"). At the hospital, Fantine dies after Valjean promises to rescue her daughter Cosette from the thieving Thénardiers, innkeepers who are paid to raise her ("Fantine's Death (Come to Me)"). Valjean escapes Javert ("The Confrontation"). In Montfermeil, the Thénardiers use Cosette as a servant, treating her cruelly, while extorting money from Fantine ("Castle on a Cloud"; "Master of the House"). Valjean pays them 1,500 francs to release Cosette ("The Bargain") and takes her to Paris ("The Waltz of Treachery").

In 1832 Paris, unrest grows with the impending death of the merciful General Lamarque. Student revolutionaries Marius Pontmercy and Enjolras prepare for an uprising. The Thénardiers, who have lost their inn and now lead a gang of street criminals, plot scams. Their daughter Éponine befriends the streetwise urchin Gavroche ("Look Down"). She secretly loves Marius, but he falls instantly for Cosette when he meets her with Valjean, whom the Thénardiers attempt to rob ("The Robbery"). Valjean is recognized, but he and Cosette escape; Javert vows to recapture him ("Stars"). Marius persuades Éponine to help him find Cosette ("Éponine's Errand").

As Enjolras rallies the students ("The ABC Café/Red and Black"), Marius pines for Cosette. News of Lamarque's death sparks plans for revolution ("Do You Hear the People Sing?"). Cosette confronts Valjean about his secrets ("In My Life"). Éponine finds Cosette, and Marius and Cosette confess their love ("A Heart Full of Love"). Thénardier and his gang arrive to rob Valjean's house but are foiled by Éponine's warning ("The Attack on Rue Plumet"). Believing Javert has found him, Valjean plans to flee with Cosette. On the eve of the 1832 Paris Uprising, Enjolras exhorts all of Paris to join the revolution. Éponine acknowledges in anguish that Marius will never love her. Javert plans to spy on the students and rebels, who steel themselves for battle ("One Day More").

=== Act II ===
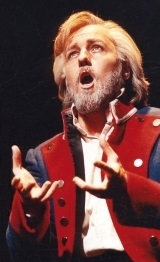
John Owen-Jones as Jean Valjean

The students build a barricade; Marius discovers that Éponine has disguised herself as a boy to join the rebels ("Building the Barricade"). To keep her safe, he sends her to deliver a farewell letter to Cosette ("On My Own"). Valjean intercepts the letter and learns about Marius and Cosette's romance. The French army arrives, demanding surrender ("At the Barricade"). Javert, disguised as a rebel, is exposed as a spy by young Gavroche ("Little People"). Wounded during the fighting, Éponine, confessing her love for Marius, dies in his arms ("A Little Fall of Rain (Eponine's Death)").

Valjean arrives disguised as a soldier, hoping to protect Marius ("Night of Anguish"). He saves Enjolras from a soldier. Valjean releases Javert instead of executing him, shaking Javert's rigid view of God and justice ("The First Attack"). As dawn approaches, the students prepare for attack ("Drink with Me"). Valjean prays for Marius's safety, offering God his own life ("Bring Him Home"). Enjolras realizes the people of Paris have not risen up but resolves to fight on ("Dawn of Anguish"). The army attacks; Gavroche is killed ("The Second Attack (Death of Gavroche)"), and all the students but Marius die. Valjean carries a gravely wounded Marius through the sewers and collapses ("The Final Battle"). Thénardier, looting bodies, comes upon the unconscious Valjean and Marius, taking a ring from the latter and fleeing ("Dog Eats Dog"). At the sewer's exit, Valjean finds Javert waiting; he begs Javert for time to bring Marius to a doctor. Javert, unable to reconcile Valjean's mercy with his worldview, kills himself ("Javert's Suicide").

Paris mourns the fallen students ("Turning"). Marius grieves his friends and wonders who saved him ("Empty Chairs at Empty Tables"). Valjean blesses Marius and Cosette's marriage ("Every Day") but tells Marius he is an escaped convict and must leave to protect Cosette ("Valjean's Confession"). At their wedding ("Wedding Chorale"), the Thénardiers attempt to blackmail Marius, who realizes Valjean carried him from the barricades ("Beggars at the Feast"). Marius and Cosette rush to find Valjean.

=== Epilogue ===
At a convent, Valjean awaits death. Fantine's spirit assures him of forgiveness. Cosette and Marius arrive in time to bid farewell. Valjean thanks God for seeing Cosette grown and happy ("Valjean's Death"). He entrusts her with his past and tells her the truth about her mother. Guided by the spirits of Fantine and Éponine, who remind him that "to love another person is to see the face of God", he dies at peace, joining the souls of the fallen in a hopeful vision of freedom ("Do You Hear the People Sing?" (reprise)").

== Musical numbers ==
=== Prologue ===
- "Work Song (Look Down)" – Chain Gang, Jean Valjean, Javert
- "On Parole" – Jean Valjean, Farmer, Laborer, Innkeeper, Innkeeper's Wife, Bishop
- "Valjean Arrested/Valjean Forgiven" – Bishop, Constables
- "Valjean's Soliloquy (What Have I Done?)" – Jean Valjean

=== Act I ===
- "At the End of the Day" – Fantine, Foreman, Jean Valjean, Factory Workers, Townspeople
- "I Dreamed a Dream" – Fantine
- "Lovely Ladies" – Fantine, Sailors, Old Woman, Pimp, Crone, Prostitutes
- "Fantine's Arrest" – Bamatabois, Fantine, Javert, Jean Valjean
- "The Runaway Cart" – Fauchevelant, Jean Valjean, Javert
- "Who Am I?" – Jean Valjean
- "Fantine's Death (Come To Me)" – Fantine, Jean Valjean
- "Confrontation" – Jean Valjean, Javert
- "Castle on a Cloud" – Little Cosette, Little Eponine, Madame Thénardier
- "Master of the House" – Thénardier, Madame Thénardier, Inn Guests
- "The Bargain/Thénardier's Waltz of Treachery" – Jean Valjean, Little Cosette, Thénardier, Madame Thénardier
- "Look Down" – Gavroche, Marius, Enjolras, Townspeople
- "The Robbery" – Thénardier, Madame Thénardier, Marius, Eponine, Jean Valjean, Javert, Gavroche
- "Stars" – Javert
- "Eponine's Errand" – Eponine, Marius
- "The ABC Cafe/Red and Black" – Enjolras, Marius, Grantaire, Gavroche, Students
- "Do You Hear The People Sing?" – Enjolras, Marius, Students
- "In My Life" – Cosette, Marius, Eponine, Jean Valjean
- "A Heart Full of Love" – Marius, Cosette, Eponine
- "The Attack on Rue Plumet" – Thénardier, Eponine, Marius, Cosette, Jean Valjean, Montparnasse, Claquesous, Babet, Brujon
- "One Day More" – Company

=== Act II ===
- "Building the Barricade" – Enjolras, Javert, Grantaire, Marius, Éponine, Students
- "On My Own" – Éponine
- "At the Barricade" – Enjolras, Marius, Gavroche, Army Officer, Students
- "Javert at the Barricade" – Javert, Enjolras
- "Little People" – Gavroche, Enjolras, Javert
- "A Little Fall of Rain (Eponine's Death)" – Éponine, Marius
- "Night of Anguish" – Enjolras, Students
- "The First Attack" – Enjolras, Marius, Jean Valjean, Javert, Students
- "Drink With Me" – Grantaire, Students, Women's Chorus
- "Bring Him Home" – Jean Valjean
- "Dawn of Anguish" – Enjolras
- "The Second Attack (Gavroche's Death)" – Enjolras, Marius, Jean Valjean, Gavroche, Grantaire, Students
- "The Final Battle" – Army Officer, Enjolras, Students
- "The Sewers/Dog Eats Dog" – Thénardier
- "Javert's Suicide" – Javert
- "Turning" – Townspeople
- "Empty Chairs at Empty Tables" – Marius
- "A Heart Full of Love" (reprise) – Marius, Cosette, Jean Valjean
- "Valjean's Confession" – Valjean, Marius
- "The Wedding" – Wedding Guests
- "Beggars at the Feast" – Marius, Thénardier, Madame Thénardier

=== Epilogue ===
- "Valjean's Death" – Valjean, Fantine, Marius, Cosette, Eponine
- "Do You Hear the People Sing?" (reprise) – Company

== Casts ==
=== Original casts ===
Character	France	West End	Broadway	US tour	UK tour	Broadway revival	UK tour	US tour	Broadway revival	International tour
Character	1980	1985	1987		1992	2006	2009	2010	2014	
Jean Valjean	Maurice Barrier	Colm Wilkinson	Colm Wilkinson	William Solo	Jeff Leyton	Alexander Gemignani	John Owen-Jones	Lawrence Clayton	Ramin Karimloo	Simon Gleeson
Javert	Jean Vallée	Roger Allam	Terrence Mann	Herndon Lackey	Philip Quast	Norm Lewis	Earl Carpenter	Andrew Varela	Will Swenson	Hayden Tee
Fantine	Rose Laurens	Patti LuPone	Randy Graff	Diane Fratantoni	Ria Jones	Daphne Rubin-Vega	Madalena Alberto	Betsy Morgan	Caissie Levy	Patrice Tipoki
Thénardier	Yvan Dautin	Alun Armstrong	Leo Burmester	Tom Alan Robbins	Tony Timberlake	Gary Beach	Ashley Artus	Michael Kostroff	Cliff Saunders	Trevor Ashley
Madame Thénardier	Marie-France Roussel	Susan Jane Tanner	Jennifer Butt	Victoria Clark	Louise Plowright	Jenny Galloway	Lynne Wilmot	Shawna Hamic	Keala Settle	Lara Mulcahy
Marius Pontmercy	Gilles Buhlmann	Michael Ball	David Bryant	Hugh Panaro	Mike Sterling	Adam Jacobs	Gareth Gates	Justin Scott Brown	Andy Mientus	Euan Doidge
Éponine Thénardier	Marianne Mille	Frances Ruffelle	Frances Ruffelle	Renee Veneziale	Meredith Braun	Celia Keenan-Bolger	Rosalind James	Chasten Harmon	Nikki M. James	Kerrie Anne Greenland
Cosette	Laur Fugère	Rebecca Caine	Judy Kuhn	Tamara Jenkins	Sarah Ryan	Ali Ewoldt	Katie Hall	Jenny Latimer	Samantha Hill	Emily Langridge
Enjolras	Christian Ratellin	David Burt	Michael Maguire	John Herrera	Daniel Coll	Aaron Lazar	Jon Robyns	Jeremy Hays	Kyle Scatliffe	Chris Durling
Gavroche	Cyrille Dupont Fabrice Ploquin Florence Davis	Ian Tucker Oliver Spencer Liza Hayden	Braden Danner RD Robb	Lantz Landry Andrew Renshaw	Adam Booth Laurence Porter Edward Crangle	Brian D'Addario Jacob Levine Austyn Myers	Jordi Clark Rob Madge	Josh Caggiano Ethan Paul Khusidman	Joshua Colley Gaten Matarazzo	Nicholas Cradock

=== Notable replacements ===
==== West End (1985–present) ====
- Jean Valjean: Alfie Boe, Simon Bowman, Killian Donnelly, Dudu Fisher, Simon Gleeson, Peter Jöback, Ramin Karimloo, Peter Karrie, Peter Lockyer, Robert Marien, John Owen-Jones, Gerónimo Rauch, Jon Robyns, Stig Rossen, Drew Sarich, Dave Willetts
- Javert: Michael Ball, David Burt, Earl Carpenter, Clive Carter, Peter Corry, Hadley Fraser, Ethan Freeman, Bradley Jaden, Norm Lewis, Michael McCarthy, Tam Mutu, Jérôme Pradon, Philip Quast, Jeremy Secomb, Hayden Tee, David Thaxton
- Fantine: Madalena Alberto, Joanna Ampil, Gunilla Backman, Samantha Barks, Sierra Boggess, Ava Brennan, Allyson Brown, Carmen Cusack, Kerry Ellis, Carrie Hope Fletcher, Rachelle Ann Go, Carola Häggkvist, Katie Hall, Ruthie Henshall, Na-Young Jeon, Lucie Jones, Kathleen Rowe McAllen, Siobhán McCarthy, Claire Moore, Silvie Paladino, Jenna Russell, Celinde Schoenmaker, Caroline Sheen, Carley Stenson, Rebecca Storm, Patrice Tipoki
- Marius: Graham Bickley, Simon Bowman, Alistair Brammer, Glenn Carter, Martin Crewes, Hadley Fraser, Gareth Gates, Nick Jonas, Jon Lee, Tom Lowe, Adrian Lewis Morgan, Jon Robyns, Martin Smith, Hayden Tee, Jac Yarrow
- Cosette: Gina Beck, Celia Graham, Katie Hall, Lucie Jones, Camilla Kerslake, Myrra Malmberg
- Young Cosette: Serrana Su-Ling Bliss
- Éponine: Sabrina Aloueche, Joanna Ampil, Samantha Barks, Meredith Braun, Shonagh Daly, Carrie Hope Fletcher, Linzi Hateley, Danielle Hope, Laura Michelle Kelly, Alexia Khadime, Eva Noblezada, Silvie Paladino, Siân Reeves, Lea Salonga, Caroline Sheen, Nancy Sullivan, Nathania Ong, Jess Folley, Shan Ako
- Young Éponine: Carrie Hope Fletcher
- Thénardier: Martin Ball, Cameron Blakely, Adam Gillen, Barry James, Luke Kempner, Chris Langham, Matt Lucas, Hilton McRae, Peter Polycarpou, Stephen Tate
- Madame Thénardier: Rosemary Ashe, Tracie Bennett, Vicky Entwistle, Josefina Gabrielle, Jenny Galloway, Linzi Hateley, Bonnie Langford, Claire Machin, Claire Moore, Louise Plowright, Jodie Prenger, Marina Prior, Gay Soper, Harriet Thorpe, Lizzie Bea
- Enjolras: Graham Bickley, Killian Donnelly, Bradley Jaden, Ramin Karimloo, Glyn Kerslake, Jamie Muscato, John Owen-Jones, David Thaxton, Oliver Thornton
- Gavroche: Jonathan Bailey, James Buckley, James Byng, Chris Fountain, Daniel Huttlestone, Paul Keating, Rob Madge, Perry Millward, Adam Searles

==== Broadway (1987–2003) ====
- Jean Valjean: Rob Evan, Dudu Fisher, Robert Marien, Gary Morris
- Javert: Anthony Crivello, Robert Cuccioli, Gregg Edelman, Shuler Hensley, Joseph Mahowald, Michael McCarthy, Chuck Wagner, Robert Westenberg
- Fantine: Laurie Beechman, Donna Kane, Andrea McArdle, Maureen Moore, Rachel York, Debbie Gravitte, Catherine Hickland, Paige O'Hara, Melba Moore, Christy Baron, Juliet Lambert, Alice Ripley, Lauren Kennedy, Jacquelyn Piro Donovan
- Marius: Chris Diamantopoulos, Eric Kunze, Peter Lockyer, Ricky Martin, Hugh Panaro, Matthew Porretta, Kevin Kern
- Young Cosette: Lacey Chabert, Lea Michele,
- Cosette: Jacquelyn Piro Donovan
- Éponine: Jessica Boevers, Catherine Brunell, Debbie Gibson, Diana Kaarina, Megan Lawrence, Lea Salonga, Natalie Toro, Sarah Uriarte Berry, Shanice, Kerry Butler
- Thénardier: Ed Dixon, Nick Wyman
- Madame Thénardier: Betsy Joslyn
- Enjolras: Ron Bohmer, Ben Davis, Joseph Mahowald, Gary Mauer
- Gavroche: Michael Shulman, Jarrod Spector, Jason Tam, Michael Zeidman, Grant Rosenmeyer, Harrison Chad, Nick Jonas

==== Broadway revival (2006–2008) ====
- Jean Valjean: John Owen-Jones, Drew Sarich
- Javert: Ben Davis, Robert Hunt, Drew Sarich
- Fantine: Judy Kuhn, Lea Salonga
- Éponine: Megan McGinnis
- Thénardier: Chip Zien
- Madame Thénardier: Ann Harada
- Enjolras: Max von Essen

==== US tour (2010–2013) ====
- Jean Valjean: Peter Lockyer
- Enjolras: Jason Forbach
- Gavroche: Joshua Colley, Gaten Matarazzo

==== Broadway revival (2014–2016) ====
- Jean Valjean: Alfie Boe, John Owen-Jones
- Javert: Earl Carpenter, Hayden Tee
- Fantine: Montego Glover, Erika Henningsen, Alison Luff
- Marius: Chris McCarrell
- Thénardier: Gavin Lee
- Enjolras: Jason Forbach, Wallace Smith

==== International tour (2014–2016) ====
- Jean Valjean: John Owen-Jones
- Javert: Earl Carpenter
- Fantine: Rachelle Ann Go
- Éponine: Carrie Hope Fletcher
- Thénardier: Cameron Blakely, Peter Polycarpou

== Productions ==
=== Resident productions ===
==== Original: France ====
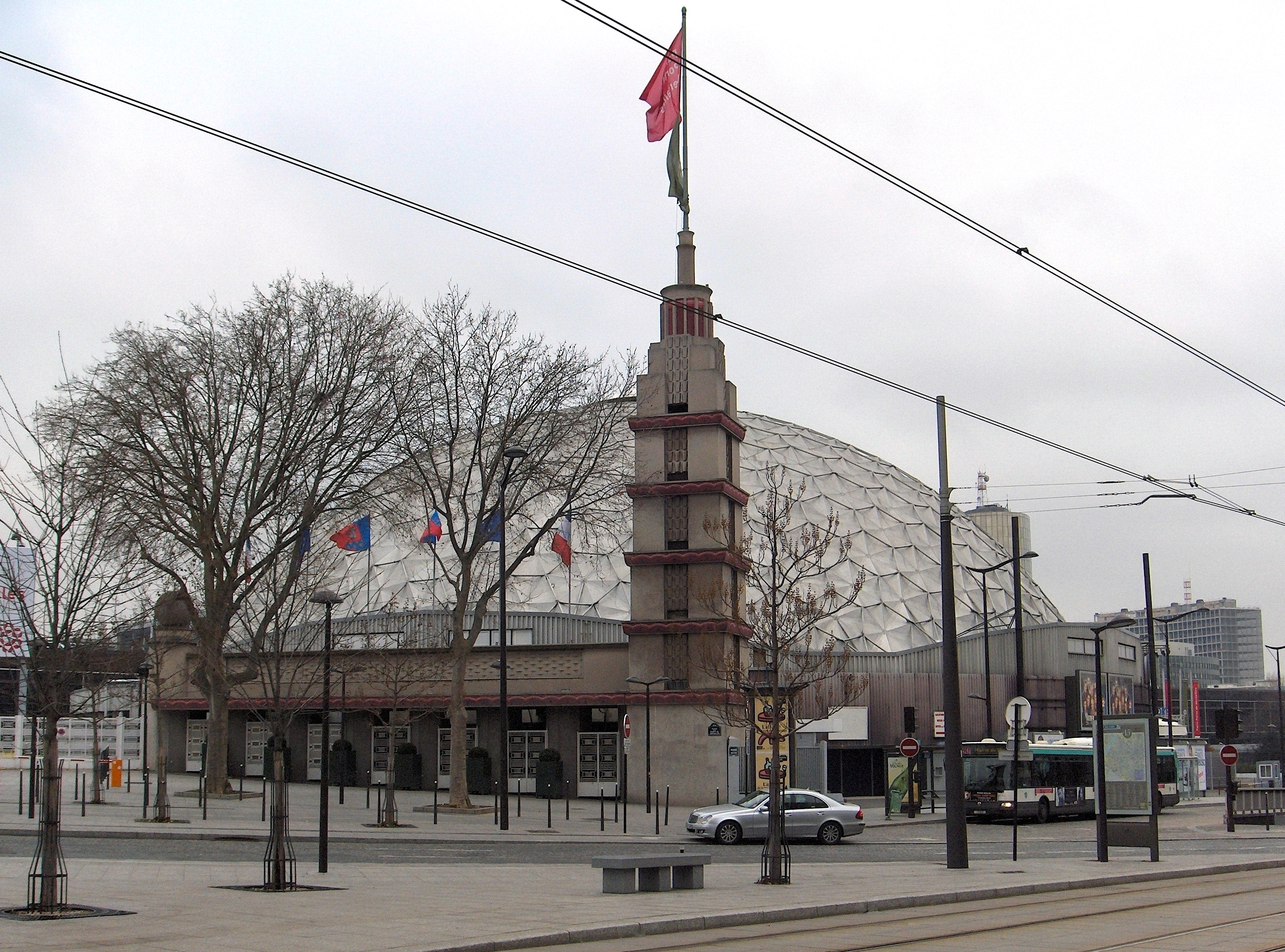
The Palais des Sports, now Dôme de Paris, in Paris where the musical was first performed.

After the French concept album was released in 1980, in September of that year, a stage version directed by veteran French film director Robert Hossein was produced at the Palais des Sports in Paris. The show was a success, with 100 performances seen by over 500,000 people.

Most of the cast from the concept album performed in the production. The cast included Maurice Barrier as Valjean, Jean Vallée as Javert, Rose Laurens as Fantine, Maryse Cédolin and Sylvie Camacho and Priscilla Patron as Young Cosette, Marie-France Roussel as Mme. Thénardier, Yvan Dautin as M. Thénardier, Florence Davis and Fabrice Ploquin and Cyrille Dupont as Gavroche, Marianne Mille as Éponine, Gilles Buhlmann as Marius, Christian Ratellin as Enjolras, Fabienne Guyon as Cosette, René-Louis Baron as Combeferre, Dominique Tirmont as M. Gillenormand, Anne Forrez as Mlle. Gillenormand, and Claude Reva as the storyteller.

==== West End (1985) ====
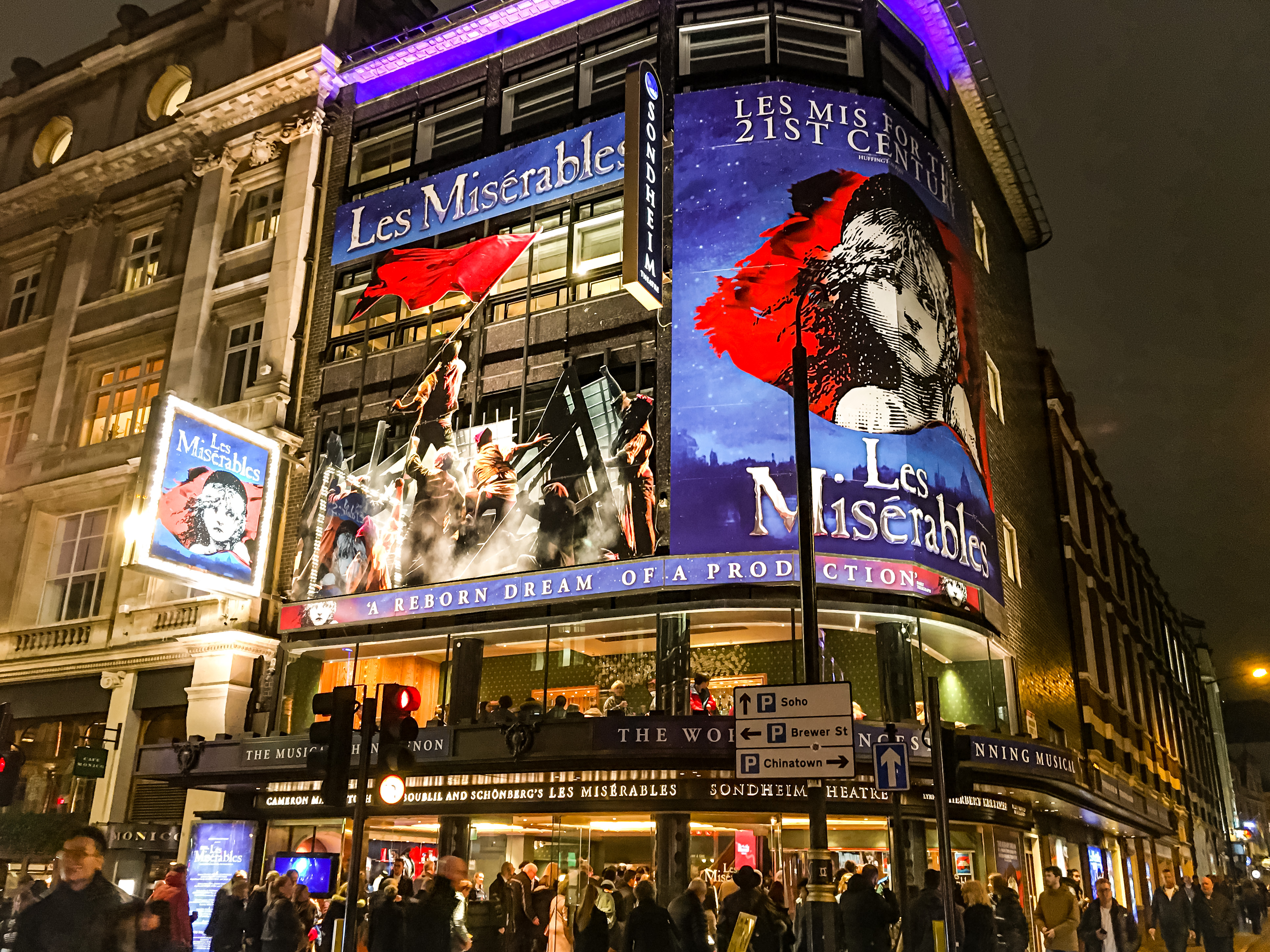
Les Misérables at Sondheim Theatre in London

The English-language version, with lyrics by Herbert Kretzmer and additional material by James Fenton, was substantially expanded and reworked from a literal translation by Siobhan Bracke of the original Paris version, in particular adding a prologue to tell Jean Valjean's background story. Kretzmer's lyrics are not a direct translation of the French, a term that Kretzmer refused to use. A third of the English lyrics were a rough translation, another third were adapted from the French lyrics and the final third consisted of new material. The majority is performed in recitative style; the vocalists use natural speech rather than strict musical metrics.

The first production in English, produced by Cameron Mackintosh and adapted and directed by Trevor Nunn and John Caird, played in preview performances beginning on 28 September 1985 and formally opened on 8 October 1985 at the Barbican Centre, London. It was billed in the programme as "The Royal Shakespeare Company presentation of the RSC/Cameron Mackintosh production". The set was designed by John Napier, costumes by Andreane Neofitou and lighting by David Hersey. Musical supervision and orchestrations were by John Cameron, who had been involved with the show since Boublil and Schönberg hired him to orchestrate the original French concept album. Musical staging was by Kate Flatt with musical direction by Martin Koch.

The original London cast included Colm Wilkinson as Jean Valjean, Roger Allam as Javert, Ken Caswell as the Bishop of Digne, Patti LuPone as Fantine, Zoë Hart, Justine McIntyre, Jayne O'Mahony and Joanne Woodcock as Young Cosette, Danielle Akers, Gillian Brander and Juliette Caton as Young Éponine, Susan Jane Tanner as Madame Thénardier, Alun Armstrong as Thénardier, Frances Ruffelle as Éponine, Rebecca Caine as Cosette, Michael Ball as Marius, David Burt as Enjolras, Clive Carter as Grantaire/Bamatabois, with Ian Tucker, Oliver Spencer and Liza Hayden sharing the role of Gavroche.

On 4 December 1985, the show transferred to the Palace Theatre in the West End and moved again on 3 April 2004, to the smaller Queen's Theatre, now called the Sondheim Theatre, with some staging revisions. The show played its 10,000th performance on 5 January 2010, and celebrated its 30th anniversary in October 2015. The co-production has generated valuable income for the Royal Shakespeare Company.

The show closed temporarily at the Queen's Theatre on 13 July 2019 to allow for theatre refurbishments, while Les Misérables: The Staged Concert was performed at the adjacent Gielgud Theatre for a four-month run.

===== 2019 updated staging =====
Using the updated staging developed for the 2009–2010 UK touring production, the musical began previews at the newly renamed Sondheim Theatre on 18 December 2019, with opening night on 16 January 2020. The production is co-directed by James Powell and Laurence Connor with set and image design by Matt Kinley, lighting by Paule Constable, sound by Mick Potter and costumes by Andreane Neofitou and Christine Rowlands. The first cast for this version included Jon Robyns (Valjean), Bradley Jaden (Javert), Carrie Hope Fletcher (Fantine), Shan Ako (Éponine), Lily Kerhoas (Cosette), Harry Apps (Marius), Gerard Carey (Thénardier), Josefina Gabrielle (Madame Thénardier) and Ashley Gilmour (Enjolras).

The show was forced to close temporarily from 16 March 2020, as a result of the COVID-19 pandemic. It reopened on 25 September 2021. A gala performance on 8 October 2025 marked the 40th anniversary, featuring an all-star cast. Considered one continuous production despite revisions, Les Misérables played its 16,000th performance in London on 17 February 2026.

==== Broadway (1987) ====
The musical opened as a pre-Broadway tryout at the Kennedy Center's Opera House in Washington, D.C., on 27 December 1986. It ran for eight weeks through 14 February 1987.

The musical then premiered on Broadway on 12 March 1987 at The Broadway Theatre. Wilkinson and Ruffelle reprised their roles from the London production. The $4.5 million production had a more than $4 million advance sale prior to its New York opening.

The show underwent further tightening, namely with improved sewer lighting and the incorporation of the Javert suicide scene effect. A New York Times report consisted of the following: "The transfer from London to the United States has prompted further modifications. 'We are taking this opportunity to rethink and perfect, to rewrite some details which probably no one else will see, but which for us are still long nights of work,' Mr. Boublil says. 'There are things that nobody had time to do in London, and here we have a wonderful opportunity to fix a few things. No one will notice, perhaps, but for us, it will make us so happy if we can better this show. We would like this to be the final version.'" Two songs were deleted—the complete version of Gavroche's song "Little People" and the adult Cosette's "I Saw Him Once". A short section at the beginning of "In My Life" replaced "I Saw Him Once". The lyrics in Javert's "Stars" were changed. It now ended with the line, "This I swear by the stars!", while the London production and cast recording ended with the repeated line, "Keeping watch in the night".

The original Broadway cast included Wilkinson as Jean Valjean, David Bryant as Marius, Judy Kuhn as Cosette, Michael Maguire as Enjolras, Ruffelle as Éponine, Braden Danner as Gavroche, Donna Vivino as Young Cosette, Jennifer Butt as Madame Thénardier, Leo Burmester as Thénardier, Randy Graff as Fantine, Terrence Mann as Javert, Chrissie McDonald as Young Éponine, Anthony Crivello as Grantaire, Jesse Corti as Courfeyrac, and Marcus Lovett as Babet.

The musical ran at the Broadway Theatre through 10 October 1990, when it moved to the Imperial Theatre. It was scheduled to close on 15 March 2003, but the closing was postponed by a surge in public interest. According to an article in The Scotsman, "Sales picked up last October, when Sir Cameron made the announcement that the show would be closing on March 15th... its closure postponed to May 18th because of an unexpected increase in business." After 6,680 performances in sixteen years, when it closed on 18 May 2003, it was the second-longest-running Broadway musical after Cats. It was surpassed by The Phantom of the Opera in 2006.

This production and its advertising in New York City is a recurring theme in American Psycho. The reviewer for the Financial Times wrote that Les Misérables is "the book's hilarious main cultural compass-point".

==== Australia (1987) ====
A production opened in Australia at the Theatre Royal, Sydney on 27 November 1987. The cast featured Normie Rowe as Valjean, Philip Quast as Javert, Anthony Warlow as Enjolras, Debra Byrne as Fantine, Simon Burke as Marius, Marina Prior as Cosette, Jodie Gillies as Eponine, Barry Langrish as Thénardier, and Robyn Arthur as Madame Thénardier. Rob Guest later took over the role of Valjean. The production closed on 17 August 1991.

==== Toronto (1989) ====
The first Canadian production of Les Misérables began performances at the Royal Alexandra Theatre on 15 March 1989. The cast was headed by Michael Burgess as Jean Valjean, with Thomas Goerz as Javert and Louise Pitre as Fantine. After 14 months, the production toured other Canadian cities, including Vancouver, before returning to Toronto where it played another year, before finally closing on 5 July 1992.

==== Broadway (2006–2008) ====
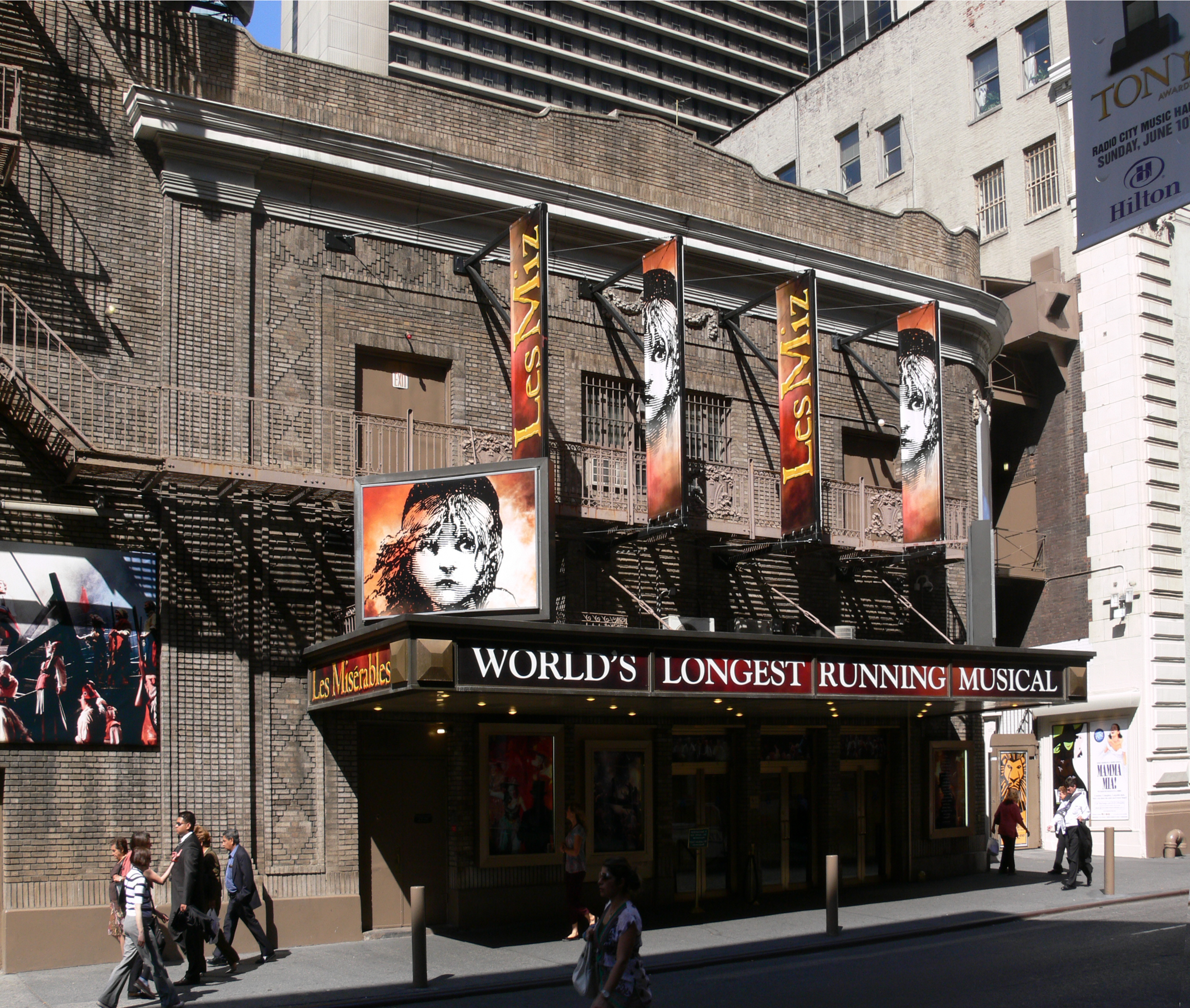
The 2006 Broadway revival of Les Misérables at the Broadhurst Theatre

Only three years after the original run closed, Les Misérables began a return to Broadway on 9 November 2006 at the Broadhurst Theatre. Using the set, costumes, performers, and other resources from the recently finished third US national touring production, the production was only slightly altered. Minor changes included colourful projections blended into its existing lighting design, and a proscenium that extended out into the first two boxes on either side of the stage. Some cuts made to the show's prologue during its original Broadway run were restored, lyrics for Gavroche's death scene (known in the revival as "Ten Little Bullets") cut during the development of the original London production were restored, and much of the show was re-orchestrated by Christopher Jahnke, introducing a snare and timpani-heavy sound played by a 14-member band, a reduction of about 8 musicians from the original production's 22 musician orchestration.

The original 2006 Broadway revival cast included Alexander Gemignani as Jean Valjean, Norm Lewis as Javert, Daphne Rubin-Vega as Fantine, Celia Keenan-Bolger as Éponine, Aaron Lazar as Enjolras, Adam Jacobs as Marius, Ali Ewoldt as Cosette, Gary Beach as Thénardier, Jenny Galloway as Madame Thénardier, Drew Sarich as Grantaire, Brian D'Addario, Jacob Levine, Skye Rainforth and Austyn Myers as Gavroche, and Tess Adams, Kylie Liya Goldstein and Carly Rose Sonenclar as Young Cosette/Young Éponine.

The revival closed on 6 January 2008 after 17 previews and 463 performances.

==== Toronto (2013–2014) ====
A production starring Canadian Ramin Karimloo was mounted at the Princess of Wales Theatre in Toronto. Co-directed by Lawrence Connor and James Powell, the production was based on the 2009 UK touring production. Previews began on 27 September 2013 with the opening night on 9 October. Preparatory to a Broadway transfer, Toronto performances ended on 2 February 2014. In addition to Karimloo as Jean Valjean, Carpenter reprised the role of Javert. Other cast members included Genevieve Leclerc as Fantine, Samantha Hill as Cosette, Melissa O'Neil as Éponine, Perry Sherman as Marius, Cliff Saunders as Monsieur Thénardier, Lisa Horner as Madame Thénardier, and Mark Uhre as Enjolras. The roles of young Cosette and young Éponine were shared by Ella Ballentine, Saara Chaudry and Madison Oldroyd. Gavroche was shared by David Gregory Black and Aiden GlennRead. Colm Wilkinson, who originated the role of Jean Valjean, portrayed the Bishop of Digne in a one-day performance symbolically handing the torch (along with the candlesticks) to Karimloo.

==== Broadway (2014) ====
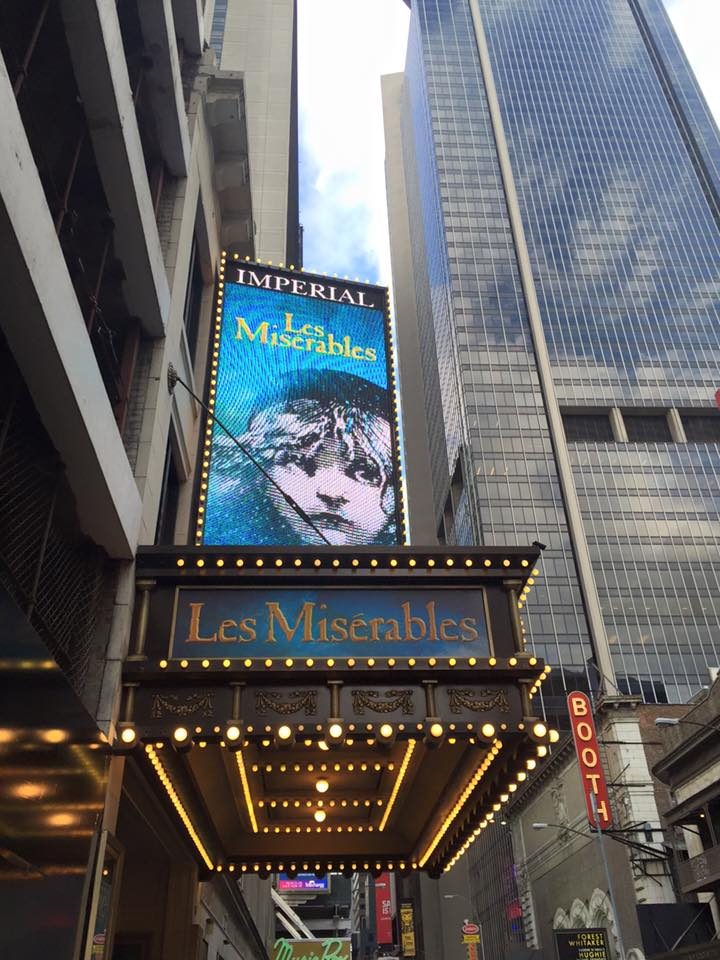
The 2014 Broadway revival of Les Misérables at the Imperial Theatre

The 2013 Toronto production moved to Broadway in March 2014 with previews beginning 1 March 2014 at the Imperial Theatre and an official opening on 23 March 2014. The creative team again was directed by Laurence Connor and James Powell, with set design by Matt Kinley, costumes by Andreane Neofitou and Christine Rowlands, lighting by Paule Constable, sound by Mick Potter and projections by Fifty-Nine Productions. Cameron Mackintosh once again produced the show. Karimloo, Will Swenson, Caissie Levy, and Nikki M. James starred as Jean Valjean, Javert, Fantine, and Éponine respectively, with Andy Mientus as Marius and Samantha Hill as Cosette. Angeli Negron and McKayla Twiggs shared the role of Young Cosette. The production closed on 4 September 2016, after 1,026 performances over two-and-a-half years. The revival recouped its entire initial investment and grossed $109 million.

The 2014 Broadway revival was nominated for 3 Tony Awards: Best Revival of a Musical, Best Leading Actor in a Musical for Karimloo, and Best Sound Design for Potter.

=== Touring productions ===
==== US national tours ====
The show had three national touring companies of the original Broadway production in the US, all of which shared the Broadway producer and manager, creative teams, as well nearly identical sets, costumes, and lighting. While the touring production and the New York production were running simultaneously, the staff, cast members, crew, and musicians of the two productions interchanged often, which contributed to keeping both companies of the show in form. When the New York production closed in 2003, the Third National Tour continued for another three years, and enjoyed the influx of many members from the original and subsequent New York companies.

The First National Tour opened at Boston's Shubert Theatre on 12 December 1987 and continued to play major cities until late 1991. The Second National Tour (called "The Fantine Company") opened at Los Angeles' Shubert Theatre on 1 June 1988. The production played for fourteen months and then transferred to San Francisco's Curran Theatre, where it enjoyed a similar run. The Third National Tour of Les Misérables (called "The Marius Company") was one of the longest running American touring musical productions. Opening on 28 November 1988, at the Tampa Bay Performing Arts Center in Florida, and closing on 23 July 2006, at the Fox Theatre in St. Louis, Missouri, the tour ran for seventeen years and 7,061 performances. The tour played in 145 cities in 43 states. The same touring company also frequently performed in Canada, made a 1994 diversion to Singapore, and another diversion in 2002 to be the first Western musical production to visit China, opening in Shanghai's Grand Theatre for a three-week engagement.

All US productions (including Broadway and its revival) were visually identical in scale and design but the third national tour was notable for its portability without sacrificing the Broadway-caliber experience. Thanks to innovative touring techniques borrowed from the pop/rock concert industry, the 4.5 million dollar production was adaptable to smaller and larger venues and traveled complete in all of 8 semi tractor trailers. It was set up and ready to go in less than 24 hours and broken down and packed up in about 16 hours. This allowed it to reach many cities and venues in its acclaimed, original Broadway form.

A national tour began on 21 September 2017 at the Providence Performing Arts Centre (PPAC). It starred Nick Cartell as Valjean, Josh Davis as Javert, Melissa Mitchell as Fantine, J. Anthony Crane as Thénardier, Allison Guinn as Madame Thénardier, Joshua Grosso as Marius, Phoenix Best as Éponine, Matt Shingledecker as Enjolras and Jillian Butler as Cosette. The roles of young Cosette and Éponine were shared by Zoe Glick and Sophie Knapp, while the role of Gavroche was shared by Jordan Cole and Julian Lerner. It used much of the staging and technical work of the 2014 Broadway revival.

A North American tour launched on 7 October 2022 at the State Theatre, Cleveland, with Nick Cartell as Jean Valjean, Preston Truman Boyd as Javert, Haley Dortch as Fantine, Matt Crowle as Thénardier, Christina Rose Hall as Madame Thénardier, Addie Morales as Cosette, Gregory Lee Rodriguez as Marius, Christine Heesun Hwang as Éponine, Devin Archer as Enjolras, and Randy Jeter as Bishop of Digne. The tour is set to close at the Citizen's Opera House in Boston, MA on 28 June 2026.

==== UK and Ireland tours ====
The first tour of the UK and Ireland opened at the Palace Theatre, Manchester on 14 April 1992 with Jeff Leyton (Jean Valjean), Quast (Javert), Ria Jones (Fantine), Meredith Braun (Éponine), Mike Sterling (Marius), Tony Timberlake (Thénardier), Louise Plowright (Mdme Thénardier), Fiona Sinnott (Cosette) and Daniel Coll (Enjolras). The production then moved on to the Point Theatre, Dublin, Ireland, opening 30 June 1993, and then to Playhouse, Edinburgh, Scotland, opening 23 September 1993.

A second UK tour began at the Theatre Royal, Plymouth, on 6 May 1997. The cast featured Stig Rossen (Jean Valjean), Michael McCarthy (Javert), Julia Worsley (Fantine), Gemma Sandy (Éponine), Norman Bowman (Marius), Cameron Blakely (Thénardier), Cathy Breeze (Mdme Thénardier), Rebecca Vere (Cosette) and Mark O'Malley (Enjolras). The tour finally concluded on 25 March 2000.

==== 25th anniversary UK and US tours ====
A tour to commemorate the 25th anniversary of the show began performances on 12 December 2009, at the Wales Millennium Centre in Cardiff. Differences from the original production included a new set, new costumes, new direction and alterations to the original orchestrations. The scenery was inspired by the paintings of Victor Hugo. Locations have included Manchester, Norwich, Birmingham, and Edinburgh. The tour also played a special engagement in Paris. From September through October, the show returned to the Barbican Centre, London, site of the original 1985 production. The tour cast featured John Owen-Jones as Valjean, Earl Carpenter as Javert, Gareth Gates as Marius, Ashley Artus as Thénardier, Lynne Wilmot as Madame Thénardier, Madalena Alberto as Fantine, Rosalind James as Éponine, Jon Robyns as Enjolras and Katie Hall as Cosette (with Samara Clarke as Young Cosette). The tour ended on 2 October 2010, at the Barbican Theatre.

In the fall of 2010, the tour moved to the US with a new company presented by Broadway Across America to celebrate the 25th anniversary of the show opening on Broadway. The tour opened on 19 November 2010 at the Paper Mill Playhouse in Millburn, New Jersey, starring Lawrence Clayton as Valjean, Andrew Varela as Javert, Betsy Morgan as Fantine, Jenny Latimer as Cosette, Justin Scott Brown as Marius, Chasten Harmon as Éponine, Michael Kostroff as Thénardier and Shawna Hamic as Madame Thénardier. It ran until 11 August 2013, closing at the Smith Center for the Performing Arts in Las Vegas. Varela as Javert, Jason Forbach as Enjolras and Ava Della Pietra alternating as Little Cosette and Young Éponine. In 2011 it was reported that the tour was one of six US national tours grossing over $1,000,000 per week.

===== 2018–2023 tour =====
A UK and Ireland tour similar to the 25th anniversary production began at the Curve, Leicester on 3 November 2018, starring Killian Donnelly (Valjean), Nic Greenshields (Javert), Hall (Fantine), Tegan Bannister (Éponine), Bronwen Hanson (Cosette), Harry Apps (Marius), Martin Ball (Thénardier), Sophie-Louise Dann (Madame Thénardier) and Will Richardson (Enjolras). After a hiatus due to the COVID-19 pandemic, the tour resumed performances on 23 November 2021 at the Theatre Royal, Glasgow.

==== 2014–2016 Australian and international tour ====
An Australian tour opened on 4 July 2014 at Her Majesty's Theatre, Melbourne, with Simon Gleeson as Valjean, Hayden Tee as Javert, Patrice Tipoki as Fantine, Trevor Ashley and Lara Mulcahy as the Thénardiers, Kerrie Anne Greenland as Éponine, Emily Langridge as Cosette, Euan Doidge as Marius and Chris Durling as Enjolras and Nicholas Cradock as Gavroche. Additional stops included the Crown Theatre in Perth, the Capitol Theatre in Sydney, and the Lyric Theatre QPAC in Brisbane. The production then transferred to Manila, Philippines, in March 2016, Singapore, Dubai and United Arab Emirates. The Manila and Singapore productions featured Carpenter as Javert and Blakely as Thénardier. Rachelle Ann Go played Fantine in Manila; in Dubai, Peter Polycarpou played Thénardier, Jodie Prenger was Madame Thénardier, Fletcher was Éponine, and Alistair Brammer was Enjolras.

== Concert productions ==
=== 10th anniversary concert (1995) ===
On 8 October 1995, the show celebrated the tenth anniversary of the first West End production with a concert at the Royal Albert Hall. This 10th Anniversary Concert was nearly "complete", missing only a handful of scenes, including "The Death of Gavroche", "The Robbery" and the confrontation between Marius and the Thénardiers at the wedding feast. Sir Cameron Mackintosh hand-selected the cast, which became known as the Les Misérables Dream Cast, assembled from around the world, and engaged the Royal Philharmonic Orchestra. The concert concluded with seventeen Valjeans from various international productions singing, "Do You Hear the People Sing?" in their native languages. The concert cast included Wilkinson as Valjean, Quast as Javert, Paul Monaghan as the Bishop of Digne, Ruthie Henshall as Fantine, Hannah Chick as Young Cosette, Galloway as Madame Thénardier, Armstrong as Thénardier, Adam Searles as Gavroche, Maguire as Enjolras, Ball as Marius, Kuhn as Cosette, Lea Salonga as Éponine, and Crivello as Grantaire. The concert was staged by Ken Caswell and conducted by David Charles Abell.

=== 25th anniversary concert (2010) ===
The 25th Anniversary Concert of the first West End production was held at The O2 in North Greenwich, South East London, United Kingdom, on Sunday, 3 October 2010 at 1:30 pm and 7:00 pm. It featured Alfie Boe as Jean Valjean, Norm Lewis as Javert, Salonga as Fantine, Nick Jonas as Marius, Hall as Cosette, Galloway as Madame Thénardier, Karimloo as Enjolras, Samantha Barks as Éponine, Matt Lucas as Thénardier, Mia Jenkins as Young Cosette, Rob Madge as Gavroche, Hadley Fraser as Grantaire, Carpenter as the Bishop of Digne, and Blakely as Bamatabois. Casts of the current London, international tour, original 1985 London, and several school productions took part, comprising an ensemble of three hundred performers and musicians. The concert was directed by Laurence Connor & James Powell and conducted by David Charles Abell.

=== The All-Star Staged Concert (2019–2021) ===
From 10 August to 2 December 2019, the musical was performed as a staged concert version at the Gielgud Theatre in the West End during the refurbishment of the adjacent Sondheim Theatre. Featuring a cast and orchestra of over 65, it starred Ball (Javert), Boe as (Valjean; Owen-Jones at some performances), Fletcher (Fantine), Lucas and Katy Secombe (Thénardiers) Rob Houchen (Marius), Bradley Jaden (Enjolras), Ako (Éponine), Kerhoas (Cosette), and Carpenter (Bamatabois). Simon Bowman played the Bishop of Digne for eight days after which Carpenter took over the role alongside his other two parts. The final concert was filmed and broadcast live to cinemas on 2 December and has since been released on home video and as an album. The concert returned for a run at the Sondheim Theatre from 5 December 2020. Due to the COVID-19 pandemic, the audience were socially distanced and capacity was limited to 50%. Under local COVID restrictions, the show was suspended on 16 December 2020 after 10 performances (Boe played Valjean for eight, and Owen-Jones twice). It reopened on 20 May 2021 and ran until 5 September with Robyns as Valjean, Jaden as Javert, Lucie Jones as Fantine, Carey and Gabrielle as the Thénardiers, Ako as Éponine, Apps as Marius, Jamie Muscato as Enjolras, Charlie Burn as Cosette, Carpenter as the Bishop of Digne, Blakely as Bamatabois/Babet, and at certain performances Dean Chisnall as Valjean.

=== The Arena Spectacular World Tour (2024–2026) ===
A concert production began a world tour on 19 September 2024, starting in Belfast, Northern Ireland. The tour utilized guest performers at some stops. Performers who starred in the production included Alfie Boe, Donnelly, Peter Jöback and Gerónimo Rauch as Valjean, and Ball, Jaden, Tee and Jeremy Secomb as Javert. Also in the cast were Hall, Jones, Jeon, Go and Barks as Fantine; Gavin Lee, Luke Kempner and Lucas as Thénardier; Bonnie Langford, Prior, Linzi Hateley and Salonga as Madame Thénardier; Secomb, Carpenter, Polycarpou, Quast, and Tommy Körberg as the Bishop of Digne; Nathania Ong as Éponine; Jac Yarrow as Marius; and Madge as Bamatabois. UK and US reviews of the concert were favourable. After stopping in 34 cities in 17 countries in Europe, Asia, Australia and the Middle East, the tour ended at Radio City Music Hall in New York on 9 August 2026.

== International productions ==
The show has been produced in at least 42 countries and translated into at least 23 languages: English, French (re-translated from the English version), Croatian (three versions), German (Austria and Germany), Spanish (six versions: two from Spain, two from Mexico, one from Argentina, and one from Venezuela), Japanese, Hebrew, Hungarian, Icelandic, Norwegian (Bokmål and Nynorsk), Polish, Swedish (in Sweden and in Finland), Dutch (Netherlands and Belgium), Danish, Finnish, Brazilian Portuguese, Estonian, Czech, Mauritian Creole, Basque, Catalan and Korean. Including singles and promos, there have been over seventy official recordings from worldwide productions.

The first full production in the European mainland was in Oslo, Norway at Det Norske Teatret and opened on 17 March 1988. The production was in Norwegian and starred singer/actor Øystein Wiik as Jean Valjean, Paul Åge Johannessen as Javert, Øivind Blunck as Thénardier, Kari Gjærum as Fantine, Amund Enger as Enjolras and Guri Schanke as Éponine. The production was a box office hit, with approximately 10% of Norway's entire population seeing the show in the first 6 months. Øystein Wiik went on to star as Jean Valjean in productions in Vienna and London in 1989–1990.

The stage show, which had changed so significantly since its Parisian conception as a stadium concert in 1980, was translated back into the language of Victor Hugo for its French world première in Montreal, Quebec, Canada, in 1991. Five shows a week were in French, and three per week were in English.

In 1998, a concert version in English was produced in Malta, at the Mediterranean Conference Centre, Valletta. This production was staged by a company called Act React and featured Ray Mangion as Jean Valjean, Roger Tirazona as Javert, Julie James as Fantine, Leila Benn Harris as Éponine, Claire Debono as Cosette, Fabrizio Faniello as Marius, Lawrence Gray as Enjolras, Rennie Vella as Thenardier, Doreen Galea as Madame Thenardier, Dean Zammit as Gavroche and Hannah Schembri as Little Cosette.

=== North American productions ===
In September 2008, a mini-tour produced by Atlanta's Theater of the Stars played Eisenhower Hall at the United States Military Academy, in West Point, New York; the Filene Center at the Wolf Trap National Park for the Performing Arts in Vienna, Virginia; Kansas City Starlight Theatre; and the Fox Theater in Atlanta. The set featured original pictures painted by Victor Hugo. Robert Evan reprised the role of Valjean. Also featured were Nikki Renée Daniels as Fantine and Robert Hunt as Javert, both reprising their roles from the Broadway revival. Fred Hanson directed the production. The creative team included Matt Kinley as Scenic Designer, Ken Billington as Lighting Designer, Peter Fitzgerald and Erich Bechtel as Sound Designers, Zachary Borovay as Projection Designer, and Dan Riddle as musical director and Conductor.

In 2008, the Signature Theatre in Arlington, Virginia staged a small venue "black box" version of the play. Signature received Mackintosh's special permission for the production: "One of the great pleasures of being involved with the creation of Les Misérables is seeing this marvelous musical being done in a completely different and original way." The production officially opened on 14 December 2008 (after previews from 2 December), and ran through 22 February 2009.

A 2014 production at the Dallas Theater Center modernized the staging with a setting in the modern-day United States. The concept was thought to be a refreshing stylistic change and effective as a commentary on modern inequality. The unauthorized depart from the authors' libretto and score, however, was controversial.

In Panama, Les Misérables was staged in 2014 in Spanish at the National Theatre of Panama for a short, sold-out run, directed by Aaron Zebede.

=== School edition ===
The school edition cuts a considerable amount of material from the original show. It is divided into thirty scenes and, although no critical scenes or songs have been removed, it runs 25–30 minutes shorter than the official version making the total running time about 2.5 hours. "Valjean's Soliloquy", "Stars", "A Little Fall of Rain", "Turning", and "Castle on a Cloud" lose a verse each. During "Fantine's Arrest", Bamatabois loses two verses. The song "Fantine's Death/Confrontation" is edited, and the counterpoint duel between Javert and Valjean is cut, as well as a verse by Fantine. "Dog Eats Dog" by Thénardier is truncated. "Beggars at the Feast", is shortened, with Thénardier losing a verse, and the song before it, "Wedding Chorale", is removed entirely, although the rest of the wedding remains in place. Also, the drinker's introduction to "Master of the House" is cut.

== Film adaptation ==
A film version directed by Tom Hooper was released in 2012 to generally positive reviews; it won three Academy Awards and was nominated for five more, including Best Picture.

== Recordings ==
=== French ===
- Les Misérables (1980). The original concept album was released in France as a 2-LP set on the Tréma record label.

=== English ===
- Les Misérables – Original London Cast Album (1985). Features a song titled "I Saw Him Once", sung by Cosette, which was later incorporated into the first part of "In My Life". The album has sold 887,000 copies in the US as of 2013.
- Les Misérables – Broadway Album (1987). As with its predecessor, it is incomplete, leaving out songs or parts that are more important narratively than musically (e.g., "Fantine's Arrest", "The Runaway Cart", "The Final Battle"). The album has sold 1,596,000 copies in the US as of 2013.
- Les Misérables – The Complete Symphonic Recording (1988). Released in 1989, the recording features the entire score. (The Czech Revival Recording is the only other album, in any language, to feature the entire score; the four 2003 Japanese recordings feature the entire score after the cuts first made on Broadway at the end of 2000.) It employs an international cast featuring performers from the major early productions of the musical. Produced by David Caddick and conducted by Martin Koch, it won the Best Musical Cast Show Album Grammy Award in 1990.
- Les Misérables in Concert – The Dream Cast (video, 1995). The 10th Anniversary live recording of a concert version at the Royal Albert Hall includes encores. The songs vital to the plot are included, but others, such as "At the Barricade", were left out.
- Les Misérables Live! – The 2010 Cast Album [New 25 Anniversary Production] (2010) a.k.a. Les Miserables Live! – Dream the Dream. Recorded live at the Palace Theatre in Manchester, it features new arrangements and orchestrations.
- Les Misérables in Concert – The 25th Anniversary (video, 2010). The live concert video at the O2 Arena was shown in select US theaters via NCM Fathom Events. DVD and Blu-ray versions were released in the UK in 2010 and in the United States in 2011 to promote the 2012 film adaptation.
- Les Misérables – Highlights from the Motion Picture Soundtrack (2012).
- Les Misérables – The Staged Concert (video, 2019).

== Awards and nominations ==
=== Original West End production ===
Year	Award	Category	Nominee	Result
1985	Laurence Olivier Award	Best New Musical		Nominated
1985	Laurence Olivier Award	Best Actor in a Leading Role in a Musical	Colm Wilkinson	Nominated
1985	Laurence Olivier Award	Best Actor in a Leading Role in a Musical	Alun Armstrong	Nominated
1985	Laurence Olivier Award	Best Actress in a Leading Role in a Musical	Patti LuPone	Won

=== Original Broadway production ===
Year	Award	Category	Nominee	Result
1987	Tony Award	Best Musical		Won
1987	Tony Award	Best Book of a Musical	Alain Boublil and Claude-Michel Schönberg	Won
1987	Tony Award	Best Original Score	Claude-Michel Schönberg (music) and Herbert Kretzmer & Alain Boublil (lyrics)	Won
1987	Tony Award	Best Actor in a Musical	Colm Wilkinson	Nominated
1987	Tony Award	Best Actor in a Musical	Terrence Mann	Nominated
1987	Tony Award	Best Featured Actor in a Musical	Michael Maguire	Won
1987	Tony Award	Best Featured Actress in a Musical	Frances Ruffelle	Won
1987	Tony Award	Best Featured Actress in a Musical	Judy Kuhn	Nominated
1987	Tony Award	Best Direction of a Musical	Trevor Nunn and John Caird	Won
1987	Tony Award	Best Scenic Design	John Napier	Won
1987	Tony Award	Best Costume Design	Andreane Neofitou	Nominated
1987	Tony Award	Best Lighting Design	David Hersey	Won
1987	Drama Desk Award	Outstanding Musical		Won
1987	Drama Desk Award	Outstanding Actor in a Musical	Colm Wilkinson	Nominated
1987	Drama Desk Award	Outstanding Featured Actor in a Musical	Michael Maguire	Won
1987	Drama Desk Award	Outstanding Featured Actress in a Musical	Judy Kuhn	Nominated
1987	Drama Desk Award	Outstanding Orchestrations	John Cameron	Won
1987	Drama Desk Award	Outstanding Music	Claude-Michel Schönberg	Won
1987	Drama Desk Award	Outstanding Set Design	John Napier	Won
1987	New York Drama Critics' Circle Award	Best Musical		Won

=== 2013 Toronto revival ===
Year	Award	Category	Nominee	Result
2014	Dora Award	Outstanding Production		Nominated
2014	Dora Award	Outstanding Male Performance	Ramin Karimloo	Nominated
2014	Dora Award	Outstanding Male Performance	Mark Uhre	Nominated
2014	Dora Award	Outstanding Male Performance	Aiden Glenn	Nominated
2014	Dora Award	Outstanding Female Performance	Melissa O'Neil	Won
2014	Dora Award	Outstanding Direction	Laurence Connor and James Powell	Nominated
2014	Dora Award	Outstanding Scenic Design	Matt Kinley	Nominated
2014	Dora Award	Outstanding Costume Design	Andreane Neofitou and Christine Rowland	Won
2014	Dora Award	Outstanding Lighting Design	Paule Constable	Nominated
2014	Dora Award	Outstanding Choreography	James Dodgson	Nominated
2014	Dora Award	Outstanding Ensemble	Entire ensemble	Nominated

=== 2014 Broadway revival ===
Year	Award	Category	Nominee	Result
2014	Tony Award	Best Revival of a Musical		Nominated
2014	Tony Award	Best Actor in a Leading Role in a Musical	Ramin Karimloo	Nominated
2014	Tony Award	Best Sound Design of a Musical	Mick Potter	Nominated
2014	Drama Desk Award	Outstanding Revival of a Musical		Nominated

=== 2014 Australian revival ===
Year	Award	Category	Nominee	Result
2014	Green Room Awards	Production		Nominated
2014	Green Room Awards	Actor in a Leading Role	Simon Gleeson	Nominated
2014	Green Room Awards	Actor in a Leading Role	Hayden Tee	Won
2014	Green Room Awards	Direction	James Powell and Laurence Connor	Nominated
2014	Green Room Awards	Musical Direction	Geoffrey Castles	Nominated
2014	Green Room Awards	Design (Lighting)	Paule Constable	Nominated
2014	Green Room Awards	Design (Sound)	Mick Potter	Nominated
2014	Green Room Awards	Design (Set and Costume)	Matt Kinley (Set and Image Design)	Nominated
2015	Helpmann Awards	Best Musical		Won
2015	Helpmann Awards	Best Male Actor in a Leading Role in a Musical	Simon Gleeson	Won
2015	Helpmann Awards	Best Male Actor in a Leading Role in a Musical	Hayden Tee	Nominated
2015	Helpmann Awards	Best Male Actor in a Supporting Role in a Musical	Trevor Ashley	Nominated
2015	Helpmann Awards	Best Male Actor in a Supporting Role in a Musical	Chris Durling	Nominated
2015	Helpmann Awards	Best Female Actor in a Leading Role in a Musical	Patrice Tipoki	Nominated
2015	Helpmann Awards	Best Female Actor in a Supporting Role in a Musical	Kerrie Anne Greenland	Won
2015	Helpmann Awards	Best Direction of a Musical	Laurence Connor and James Powell	Nominated
2015	Helpmann Awards	Best Choreography in a Musical	Michael Ashcroft and Geoffrey Garratt	Nominated
2015	Helpmann Awards	Best Lighting Design	Paule Constable	Won
2015	Helpmann Awards	Best Scenic Design	Matt Kinley	Nominated
2015	Helpmann Awards	Best Sound Design	Mick Potter	Won

== See also ==
- Les Misérables
- Les Misérables (British TV series)
- Lists of musicals
- Adaptations of Les Misérables
