= Don Camilo =

Parisian cabaret established in 1954

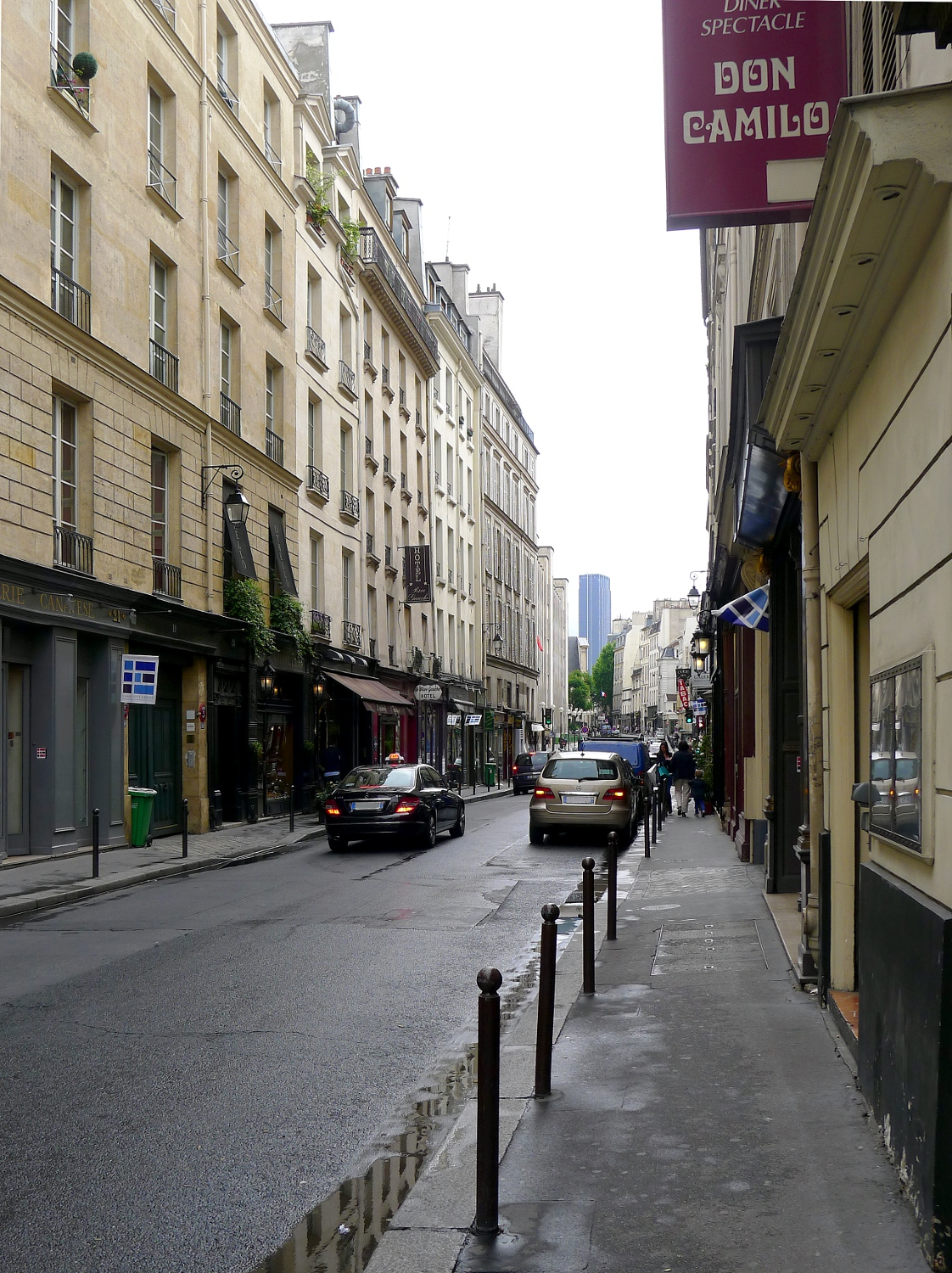
- The rue des Saints-Pères with the Don Camilo
- Interactive map of Don Camilo
- Address: 7th arrondissement of Paris in the Saint-Germain-des-Prés
- Location: Paris, France
- Coordinates: 48.8572°N 2.3322°E
- Type: Cabaret

Construction
- Opened: 1954

The Don Camilo is a Parisian cabaret established in 1954 by Jean Vergnes. It is located in the 7th arrondissement of Paris in the Saint-Germain-des-Prés quartier.

Every evening of the week, a dîner-spectacle is organised. The entertainment is provided by many artists, including singers, impersonators, comedians, chansonniers or ventriloquists. They follow each other on stage at a rapid pace (about every twenty minutes), except the star-artist who performs longer after the meal.

== Artists ==
Partial list of artists "boarders" of the Don Camilo from 1954 to 2009

- Stephane Gali
- Jean Amadou
- André Aubert
- Hugues Aufray
- AudéYoann
- René Baron alias René-Louis Baron
- Jean-Louis Blèze
- Pierre-Yves Noël
- Franck Brun
- Pascal Brunner
- Pascal Chevalier
- Philippe Clay
- Sylvain Collaro
- Darry Cowl
- Jean Constantin
- Dadzu
- David et Nestor
- Carine Davis
- Gérard Delaleau
- Pierre Douglas
- Charles Dumont
- Gérald Dahan
- Léo Ferré
- Thierry Garcia
- Laurent Gerra
- Michaël Gregorio
- Daniel Guichard
- Fabienne Guyon
- Jack Hammer (The Platters)
- Martin Kardone
- Yann Jamet
- Serge Lama
- Robert Lamoureux
- Michel Leeb
- Serge Llado
- Thierry Le Luron
- Olivier Lejeune
- Enrico Macias
- Bernard Mabille
- Mathieu
- Merry
- Dany Mauro
- Claude Nougaro
- Gilles Olivier
- Pierre Perret
- Yves Pujol
- Jean Raymond
- Serge Reggiani
- Jean Roucas
- Laurent Ruquier
- Catherine Sauvage
- Henri Tisot
- Charles Trenet
- Jean Vallée
- Les Frères Ennemis
- Le Trio Athénée
- Patrick Peralta
- Christie Caro
