= Susan Tanner =

Susan or Sue Tanner may refer to:

- Susan W. Tanner (born 1953), of the Church of Jesus Christ of Latter-day Saints
- Susan Jane Tanner, English actress
