= Les Misérables (1980 album) =

Cast recording by various artists
- Released: 1980
- Recorded: January–April 1980
- Genre: Show tunes
- Label: Tréma

Les Misérables is a concept album containing a studio cast recording of Alain Boublil and Claude-Michel Schönberg's musical Les Misérables. It was originally released in France in 1980 on the Tréma record label.

In the United States, it was issued in 1989 by Relativity Records and was subtitled The Original French Concept Album on the cover.

== Background ==
According to the album's notes, it was recorded at Studio Music Center, Wembley, and Studio Davout, Paris, between January and April 1980.

== Critical reception ==
Professional ratings
Review scores
Source	Rating
AllMusic	4/5 stars

AllMusic rates the album 4 stars out of 5. The album is reviewed there by William Ruhmann, who suggests that the authors of the musical "supposed that their French audience would be familiar with the story" and hence "concentrated more on moving things along and giving each character a musical showcase than on focusing on any one plot line", which "may have worked better on disc than on stage." He also adds that the English-language version differs considerably, e.g. "beef[ing] up the part of Valjean" and all but eliminating the part of Gavroche, but nevertheless, "anyone coming to this original French studio cast recording [...] only after experiencing the English version will be able to recognize much of it."

== Track listing ==
2 × LP – Tréma 310 086/87

Side A
No.	Title	Length
1.	"La journée est finie"	4:49
2.	"L'air de la misère"	3:52
3.	"Les beaux cheveux que voilà"	0:33
4.	"J'avais rêvé d'une autre vie"	3:18
5.	"Dites-moi ce qui se passe"	1:30
6.	"Fantine et Monsieur Madeleine"	1:58
7.	"Mon prince est en chemin"	3:48
8.	"Mam'zelle Crapaud"	1:13

Side B
No.	Title	Length
1.	"La devise du cabaretier"	4:37
2.	"Valjean chez les Thénardier"	1:43
3.	"La valse de la fourberie"	3:43
4.	"Donnez, Donnez"	6:22
5.	"Rouge et noir"	3:03
6.	"Les amis de l'ABC"	2:25

Side C
No.	Title	Length
1.	"À la volonté du peuple"	2:46
2.	"Cosette: Dans la vie"	1:26
3.	"Marius: Dans la vie"	1:28
4.	"Voilà le soir qui tombe"	1:35
5.	"Le cœur au bonheur" (Cosette et Marius)	1:39
6.	"L'un vers l'autre"	3:10
7.	"La faute à Voltaire"	2:59
8.	"La nuit de l'angoisse"	2:09
9.	"Demain" (Final 2ème Acte)	4:00

Side D
No.	Title	Length
1.	"Ce n'est rien"	2:56
2.	"L'aube du 6 Juin"	2:07
3.	"Noir ou blanc"	3:57
4.	"La mort de Gavroche"	2:48
5.	"Marius et Monsieur Gillenormand"	1:15
6.	"Le mariage, “Soyez heureux”"	1:23
7.	"L'aveu de Jean Valjean"	2:42
8.	"Marchandage et révélation"	3:03
9.	"Epilogue: la lumière"	3:30

== Cast ==
- Fantine – Rose Laurens
- Jean Valjean (aka Mr. Madeleine) – Maurice Barrier
- Inspector Javert – Jacques Mercier
- Cosette as a child – Maryse Cédolin
- Mrs. Thénardier – Marie-France Roussel
- Mr. Thénardier – Yvan Dautin
- Gavroche – Fabrice Bernard
- Marius – Richard Dewitte
- Éponine – Marie
- Cosette as a young girl – Fabienne Guyon
- Mr. Gillenormand – Dominique Tirmont

And with the kind participation of:

- The hair buyer – Mireille
- Combeferre – Salvatore Adamo
- Feuilly – Michel Delpech
- Courfeyrac – Claude-Michel Schönberg

With the exceptional participation of:

- Michel Sardou as Enjolras
