= Hayden Tee =

Australian actor-musician

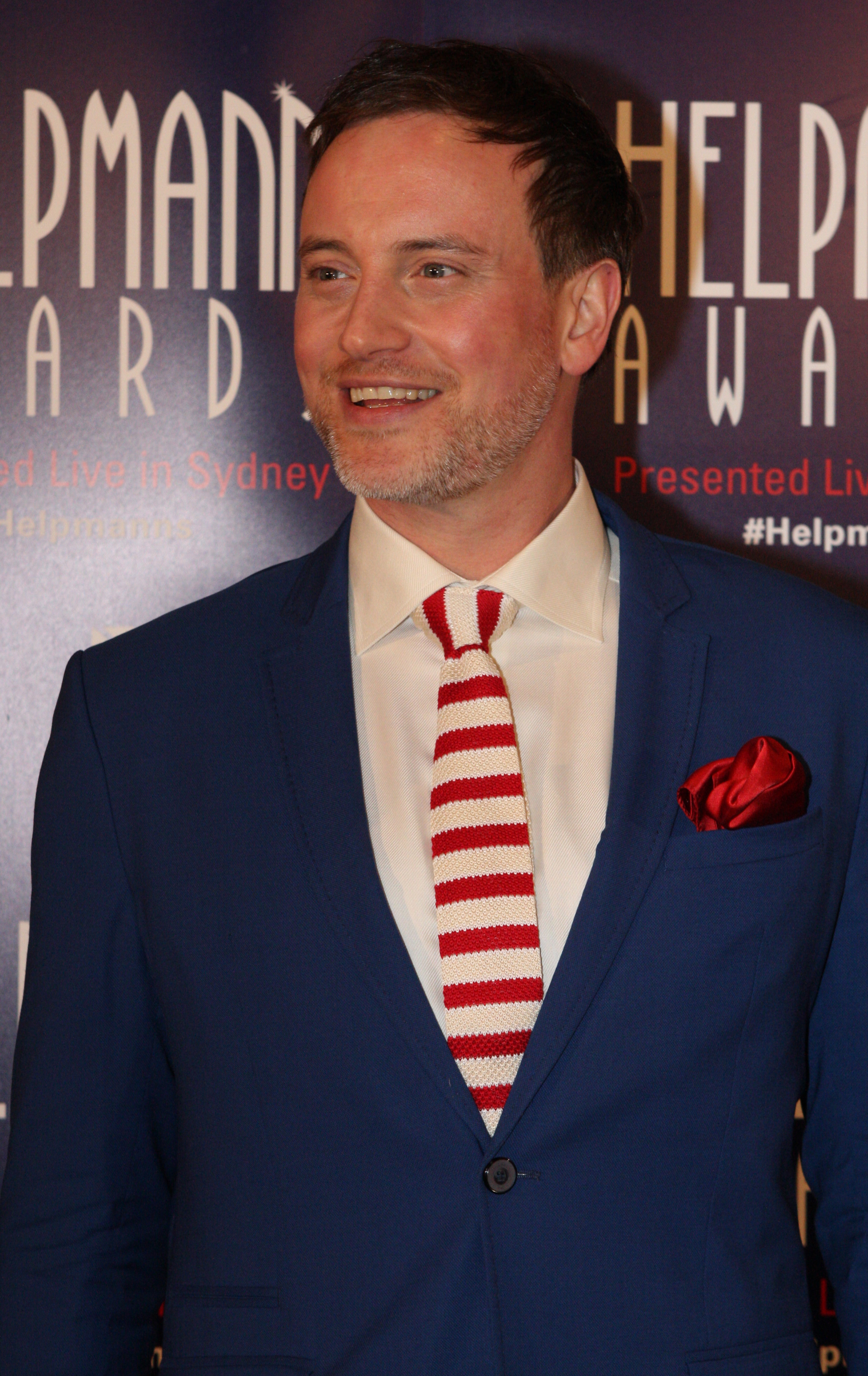
Hayden Tee at the 2015 Helpmann Awards

Hayden Tee is a New Zealand actor, singer, and makeup artist. He has played varied roles in musical theatre, concert, and cabaret. He has performed in New Zealand, the UK, South Korea, Taiwan, Australia, and the United States.

== Early life and education ==
Tee was born in New Zealand, and grew up in Maungaturoto. He moved to Auckland at the age of 16, and at 18 was invited to Sydney by Avigail Herman to study at the National Institute of Dramatic Art (NIDA). He also studied with tenor Kenneth Cornish in Auckland.

== Career ==
Tee has appeared in cabaret, musicals and theatre in Australia, New Zealand, the UK and United States. His roles include Jack in Sondheim's Into the Woods and The Wizard of Oz. In 2001, he was resident artist at the Court Theatre, Christchurch, appearing as Grumio in Kiss Me, Kate and as Wayne in Kiwifruits II.

=== Theatre and opera ===
In February 2003, Tee received positive reviews for his role in the role of Frances in Campion Decent's Three Winters Green at the Stables Theatre in Sydney. The Sydney Morning Herald wrote: "a definite star."

In May 2005 Tee played the role of Lt. Joe Cable in South Pacific under the direction of John Diedrich and Jo Anne Robinson at the Adelaide Festival Centre. Also in 2005, he was one of the twelve finalists in the international BBC Voice of Musical Theatre competition.

Following this, he went on to play the role of Marius Pontmercy in Les Misérables at the Queen's Theatre in London. He also performed the role at its 20th anniversary performance, on 8 October 2005.

He returned to Australia in late 2006 and assumed the leading role of Thomas Andrews in the Australian premiere in Sydney of the musical Titanic, garnering critical acclaim. Prior to commencing his role in Titanic, he also played in the workshop of the new Australian musical Snugglepot and Cuddlepie as Cuddlepie under the direction of Neil Armfield. In 2007 Tee starred alongside Teddy Tahu Rhodes in the opera Dead Man Walking based on the film of the same name, in which he played the role of Father Grenville.

Tee appeared as Freddy Einsford Hill in Opera Australia's production of My Fair Lady in 2009 in Auckland. The Theatre Review wrote, "Hayden Tee is in fine voice, and is deliciously sappy and gushy as the love-struck Freddy." He played Professor Bhaer in Little Women for Kookaburra, The National Musical Theatre Company, as part of their 2008/2009 subscription season. He played the role of Gus the Theatre Cat, Growltiger the Opera Cat and Bustopher Jones in Cats in the world touring production for the Really Useful Group.

=== Cabaret ===
Tee won the New York Award at the 2002 Sydney Cabaret Convention. His New York cabaret debut was at Don't Tell Mamma on 46th Street in Hell's Kitchen.

His debut solo cabaret show, "Me to a Tee" was performed to great acclaim in Sydney, Auckland and New York. His next cabaret show, Quarterlife Crisis was performed in Sydney, Melbourne, and Canberra.

Muftee, Tee's chat/cabaret/tonight show, opened at the Stables Theatre in May 2003 and was hailed as "Australia's cult cabaret hit" by The Sydney Morning Herald. This late-night show featured stars of Australia's musical theatre as guests. Originally planned as a three-week run, Muftee went on to play to packed houses for a record-breaking seven months.

Next was a short season at Kabarett Voltaire of his new cabaret, Hayden Tee. In December 2003, he was in New York again, performing Hayden Tee and Muftee at Mamma Rose's. The show was described by New York Post columnist Liz Smith as "wild and zany". During Muftee's run in New York Tee had the opportunity of performing opposite Stephen Schwartz, John Bucchino, Avenue Q's John Tartaglia, Julie Wilson and Brent Barrett.

Whilst in New York, Tee released his first CD, which has been voted by Cabaret Hotline as one of the best five male vocal releases of the year.

In Sydney, Muftee returned in February for a six-week season at The Stables. He then played Kabarett Voltaire and Melbourne's Butterfly Club with his cabaret show, Hayden Tee and toured this show for a return season at Villa Caprese and Riverside Theatres Parramatta. His show The Gin is Cold...But the Piano Is Hot, which focused on the music of Kander and Ebb, has played around Australia.

In 2008 he appeared at the Metropolitan Room in New York City in his self-titled one man show.

In 2019, Tee released "Face to Face" on Broadway Records. The musical theatre album includes a song featuring John Owen-Jones and arrangements by Nigel Ubrihien.

=== 2010-2026 ===
In 2010, he played Simon Stride in the Taiwan tour of Jekyll & Hyde and was Brad Little's alternate in the title roles.

Since locating to the US in 2010 Tee has appeared in a number of productions including playing The Wolf / Cinderella's Prince in Into the Woods (director Susan V. Booth, Alliance Theater Co), King Arthur in Camelot (dir. Ted Pappas, Pittsburgh Public Theatre), Freddy Einsford Hill In My Fair Lady (dir. Charles Repole, North Shore Music Theatre) and Mr. Darling / Captain Hook in Peter Pan (dir. Michael Lichtefeld). Tee recently played the role of Jack in the new musical version of The Importance of Being Earnest titled Being Earnest written by Paul Gordon and Jay Gruska at the New Works festival in California under the direction of Robert Kelly. Tee appeared as Edward Rutledge in 1776 at the Pittsburgh Public Theater early 2013.

Tee returned to Les Misérables playing Inspector Javert in the 2014 world tour for its Australia and Dubai stops. He later reprised the role in the Broadway revival in 2016, in the West End in 2017, in New Zealand in 2019, and in the United States tour in 2022.

In 2018 and 2019, he played Miss Trunchbull in Matilda the Musical in the West End. He reprised this role in 2020 in the international tour. In 2023, he played Lance Du Bois in & Juliet in Australia. He reprised the role in the Broadway production of the show in March and November 2025.

He reprised his role of Javert in the summer of 2025 in the World Arena Concert Tour of Les Misérables. He also played Javert in the North American tour beginning in January 2026.

Tee is a creative director of Inglot Cosmetics.

== Awards ==
Tee's debut self-titled album was voted top five male vocalist of 2003 by cabarethotlineonline.com.

He was nominated for an Adelaide Theatre Guide Award for best Individual Male Performance for his portrayal of Lt. Joe Cable in South Pacific. Tee was the recipient of the New York Award at the 2002 Sydney Cabaret Convention, winning his first trip to New York to perform. Tee was selected as one of the top 12 voices of Music Theatre 2005 at the BBC world voice of Music Theatre competition in Cardiff, Wales.

Tee received a 2009 Glugs Award for best supporting actor for his performance as Professor Bhaer in Little Women. He received an Aussietheatre Best actor in a Musical nomination for playing Thomas Andrews in Titanic, plus a 2006 Glugs Award for Best Cabaret performer. He won a Colleen Clifford Memorial Award for Best Actor in a Music Theatre (male) at the 2015 Glugs for the role of Javert in Les Misérables.
