= Braden Danner =

American actor, writer, director and producer (born 1975)

- Born: Braden Barret Tarkington Danner; July 13, 1975 (age 51); Indianapolis, Indiana, United States
- Education: Redlands High School; University of Southern California; School of Cinematic Arts
- Occupations: Actor, director, writer, producer
- Years active: 1981–1989, 2001–present

Braden Danner (born July 13, 1975) is an American actor, writer, director and producer who has worked in theatre, television, and film. He is a graduate of The USC School of Cinematic Arts. He gained critical acclaim for his performances on the stage and screen in roles such as Oliver in Oliver! on Broadway, Gavroche in the Original Broadway Cast of Les Misérables, and Buddy McGillis in ABC's One Life to Live, for which he was nominated for The Young Artist Award. While performing in Les Misérables, he also originated the role of Control in Andrew Lloyd Webber's Starlight Express, making him the first young actor in history to star in two Broadway shows at once. He later starred in the original cast of The All-New Mickey Mouse Club (1989–1996), the Disney television series that launched the careers of such superstars as Britney Spears, Justin Timberlake and Ryan Gosling.

In 2004, he graduated from The USC School of Cinematic Arts, where he first began writing, directing and producing short films. He has worked on a wide range of productions, including music videos, television news, educational programs, and reality television. He has also partnered with Google and Insights Entertainment, producing numerous television, radio and interactive media commercials.

== Early life and family ==
Danner was born on July 13, 1975, in Indianapolis, Indiana. His mother, Cheryl Danner, performed in Los Angeles at The Comedy Store and The Improv's open mic nights, and later in Indianapolis with such improvisational comedy groups as Laff Staff with comedians Ray Combs and Robert G. Lee. As a boy, Danner often accompanied his mother to her comedic rehearsals. Inspired by her performances, he soon began singing and acting at home for family and friends. He attended Redlands High School in Redlands, California. He has two sisters, photographer Diane Danner and Broadway and film actress Demaree Catherine Hill. He is a relative of two-time Pulitzer Prize-winning author, Booth Tarkington, and was given his 2nd middle name in the author's honor.

== Career ==
=== Early work ===
At age six, Danner began acting professionally in television commercials in Indianapolis. He soon appeared in regional theatre productions such as The Music Man and Charles Dickens' A Christmas Carol. In 1983, he played the comedic role of Top Man with screen legend Ginger Rogers in Miss Moffat, directed by Joshua Logan, Pulitzer Prize-winning creator of South Pacific and Annie Get Your Gun. A few weeks after finishing Miss Moffat, Danner met talent agent Nancy Carson who invited him to New York City to audition for the Tony Award-winning musical Nine, directed by Tommy Tune. After winning the role, Danner, his mother and two sisters moved to New York City. He made his Broadway debut at the age of seven as Young Guido's Schoolmate in Nine.

=== Critical success ===
In 1984, Danner starred in the title role of Oliver! on Broadway with Patti LuPone and Ron Moody. This was Danner's first production with musical magnate Cameron Mackintosh and original Oliver! director Peter Coe. Cameron Johann was originally cast in the title role, while Danner began rehearsals as a member of the ensemble cast. Upon arriving from London, however, Coe and Mackintosh agreed, "'That's not Oliver [referring to Johann], he is,' and pointed at Braden Danner." Patti LuPone relates the story in her memoir: "The first day of rehearsal the director fired the Oliver!! I left the room, clutched my throat, and thought, "I'm next!"" Danner and Oliver! opened on Broadway to a warm critical and popular reception. Critics called Danner "an appealing little Oliver" and celebrities such as Michael Jackson and Mark Hamill (of Star Wars) came to see the show. While Oliver! only received one negative review; it was enough to prompt one of the main backers to pull out, causing the show to close in spite of its overall popularity.

Later that year, Danner made his theatrical television debut on As the World Turns as Paul Ryan. Danner continued to work in stage, radio and television productions, appearing as Kurt in The Sound of Music with Jenna von Oÿ, and John Henry in The Berkshire Theatre Festival's Member of the Wedding with Carrie Hamilton, Frances Foster and David Schramm. In 1986, Danner worked with Academy Award-winning writer Ted Allen when he performed as David in Lies My Father Told Me. Of his performance, theatre critic Peter Wynne wrote, "Danner...exhibits a greater emotional range than does that of many a grown-up performer," and Richard F. Shepard of The New York Times wrote:

"Braden Danner…does a remarkably impressive job of portraying a boy of many moods, who can turn from wonderment and passion to resentment and tears; it is a formidable achievement."

=== From Les Misérables to The Mickey Mouse Club ===
In 1986, Danner won the role of Gavroche in the Original Broadway Cast of Les Misérables. Working again with Cameron Mackintosh, Danner rehearsed with directors Trevor Nunn and John Caird and originated the role of Victor Hugo's young hero. Danner first performed the role at the Opera House of The John F. Kennedy Center for the Performing Arts in Washington D.C. While in Washington D.C., he began working simultaneously on Nunn's next Broadway production, originating the role of Control in Andrew Lloyd Webber's musical Starlight Express.

When Les Misérables and Starlight Express both opened on Broadway in March 1987 to commercial success, Danner became the first young actor in history to accomplish the "dual feat" of starring in two "hits on Broadway" at the same time. Danner garnered critical acclaim for his performances from writers such as Frank Rich, then chief theatre critic of The New York Times, who wrote, "Braden Danner…tower[s] over most child actors." Critics often noted the connection that Danner shared with the audience, writing: "Braden Danner…is embraced by the audience," eliciting "sobs from a willing audience," as he walks "away with the most heart-tugging scene of all." Starlight Express became the newest Andrew Lloyd Webber success, and Les Misérables went on to win eight Tony Awards, including Best Musical, and has become one of the most successful and most performed musicals in history. The success of the original West End and Broadway productions of Les Misérables created the momentum for thousands of subsequent productions of the same musical around the world, including the film version starring Hugh Jackman and Russell Crowe.

Danner performed eight shows a week for over a year before leaving Les Misérables in early 1988 to create the role of Buddy McGillis in One Life to Live, for which he was nominated for The Young Artist Award. While performing a lead role on One Life to Live for the better part of 1988, Danner worked with actors such as Loyita Chapel, Robert S. Woods, Erika Slezak, Clint Ritchie, Brenda Brock and Ken Jenkins After leaving One Life to Live, Danner began performing at The New York Shakespeare Festival (now The Public Theater) as Isaac in Joseph Papp and A.J. Antoon's production, Genesis.

In 1989, Danner starred in the original cast of The Mickey Mouse Club (also known as "The All New Mickey Mouse Club" and "MMC"). Described by the media as the most "seasoned" and "the most impressive of all," Danner launched the Disney television series that would give rise to recording artists Britney Spears, Christina Aguilera, and Justin Timberlake and actors Keri Russell and Ryan Gosling. The Disney Channel continued to rebroadcast Danner's Season One performances from 1989 to 1995.

=== Education and filmmaking ===
In 2001, Danner moved to Los Angeles to continue to study filmmaking at USC's School of Cinematic Arts. While in film school at USC, he began creating music videos, commercials, and short films. He made his theatrical debut as a filmmaker, screenwriting, directing, producing and starring in the short film Sincerely Hollis (2003). Danner earned his degree from the USC Film School in December 2003 and graduated with his class in May 2004. He holds a Bachelor of Arts in Cinematic Arts.

After film school, Danner began working on a wide variety of productions. He worked as a producer on several educational television programs such as The Profiles Series with Lou Gossett, Jr. and The National Report Series with Hugh Downs for public television. Danner's other television credits include reality television programs such as Jury Duty, and music videos with recording artists such as Master P and MIGGS. Partnering with Insights Entertainment and Google, he has written, directed and produced over twenty television, radio and interactive media commercials for such clients as Variety Children's Charity, Stern Environmental Group, iBank and the U.S. Airforce.

== Personal life ==
=== Philanthropy ===
Throughout his career, Danner has worked with nonprofit organizations to further charitable works in The United States and around the world. In the 1980s, Danner began supporting organizations such as The Ronald McDonald House and The Muscular Dystrophy Association, participating in celebrity charity events such as The MDA Labor Day Telethon (previously known as The Jerry Lewis MDA Telethon). In 1987, he participated in the first Easter Bonnet Competition for what would later become Broadway Cares/Equity Fights AIDS. In the 1990s, Danner began working and traveling with nonprofit organizations to give humanitarian aid to people in areas of Kenya, Uganda, and Mexico where medical and dental care was not readily available. Danner helped build medical facilities at La Esperanza Medical Clinic in San Quintín and worked as a dental assistant in a free dental clinic near Tororo, Uganda. In the 2000s, he became a supporter of The Gwendolyn Strong Foundation, a nonprofit organization dedicated to increasing global awareness of spinal muscular atrophy (SMA). In the 2010s, he began working with many charitable organizations to fight human trafficking, sexual abuse and homelessness. His efforts to fight homelessness were concentrated in Los Angeles, the city with the highest concentration of homelessness in the United States. In 2011, he began working with The GEANCO Foundation, a nonprofit organization dedicated to saving and improving the lives of Nigeria's women and children through the development of world-class medical, education and recreational facilities and programs.

=== World Travel ===
Danner began traveling at an early age, performing in television and stage productions that provided opportunities for international travel such as The 1987 World Tour Production (also known as the "Australasian Tour") of Starlight Express beginning in Japan and a Norwegian Cruise Line commercial filmed in The Bahamas. He continued to travel to other countries throughout high school and college while working with nonprofit organizations. After graduating from USC in 2004, Danner took a gap year to circumnavigate the globe using a round-the-world ticket. As he traveled, he worked producing short films and interactive media projects such as Give Me Scotland (2004). Over the course of nine months, he lived in Europe, Asia and Oceania, shooting a documentary of his journey to eighteen countries, before returning to Los Angeles in 2005.
