= Les Misérables: The Staged Concert =

Film

- Directed by: Nick Morris
- Based on: Les Misérables by; Alain Boublil; Claude-Michel Schönberg; Les Misérables by Victor Hugo
- Produced by: Dione Orrom
- Starring: Alfie Boe; Michael Ball; Carrie Hope Fletcher; Matt Lucas; Katy Secombe; Rob Houchen; Lily Kerhoas; Shan Ako; Bradley Jaden; Earl Carpenter
- Edited by: Tim Thompsett
- Music by: Claude-Michel Schönberg
- Production company: Cameron Mackintosh Ltd.
- Distributed by: Universal Pictures
- Release date: 2 December 2019
- Running time: 145 minutes 165 minutes (including encore)
- Country: United Kingdom
- Language: English

Les Misérables: The Staged Concert is a 2019 British live stage recording of the 1980 musical Les Misérables, itself an adaptation of Victor Hugo's 1862 novel, filmed at the Gielgud Theatre in London's West End on 2 December 2019, and broadcast live to UK and Irish cinemas. Starring Michael Ball, Alfie Boe, Carrie Hope Fletcher and Matt Lucas, it was the final performance of the stage production Les Misérables: The All-Star Staged Concert, which ran for four months from 10 August. The album was nominated for the Grammy Award for Best Musical Theater Album at the 64th Annual Grammy Awards.

== Background ==
Queen's Theatre, which had hosted Les Misérables since 2004, closed for refurbishment in July 2019, and the show moved to the adjacent Gielgud Theatre for four months, allowing its record breaking run to continue. During its stay at the Gielgud, Les Misérables took the form of an all-star staged concert and ran for 16 weeks between 10 August and 30 November. The show returned to Queen's (now renamed the Sondheim Theatre) with a new production in December.

== The Staged Concert ==
Due to the success of the production, producer Cameron Mackintosh added an extra performance on 2 December 2019 which was broadcast live to cinemas across the UK and Republic of Ireland, and released in North America on 8 December.

The stage concert was due to return to the Sondheim Theatre for a limited run from 5 December 2020, this was extended and due to play until 28 February 2021. However the show closed as a result of the COVID-19 pandemic on 15 December after just 10 performances. It returned for a limited run between 20 May and 5 September 2021 with a renewed cast. The new cast featured Jon Robyns as Valjean, Bradley Jaden as Javert, Lucie Jones as Fantine, Gerard Carey and Josefina Gabrielle as the Thénardiers, Shan Ako as Éponine, Harry Apps as Marius, Jamie Muscato as Enjolras, Charlie Burn as Cosette, Earl Carpenter as the Bishop of Digne and understudy Javert, Cameron Blakely as Bamatabois/Babet, Nic Greenshields as Factory Foreman/Brujon, Connor Jones as Grantaire, and at certain performances Dean Chisnall playing the role of Valjean.

== Cast ==
The show starred Alfie Boe as Jean Valjean, Michael Ball as Javert, Carrie Hope Fletcher as Fantine, and Matt Lucas and Katy Secombe as the Thénardiers. Additionally, Earl Carpenter played the dual role of The Bishop of Digne (which he took over from Simon Bowman) and Bamatabois whilst understudying Javert and John Owen-Jones played Jean Valjean for three performances a week. The orchestra was conducted by Alfonso Casado Trigo. The full cast (which also appears in the live stage recording) is listed below:

- Alfie Boe as Jean Valjean
  - John Owen-Jones as Jean Valjean at selected performances
- Michael Ball as Javert
- Carrie Hope Fletcher as Fantine
- Matt Lucas as Thénardier
- Katy Secombe as Madame Thénardier
- Rob Houchen as Marius
- Lily Kerhoas as Cosette
- Shan Ako as Éponine
- Bradley Jaden as Enjolras
- Ellie Shenker as Little Cosette
- Logan Clark as Gavroche
- Earl Carpenter as The Bishop of Digne/Bamatabois and understudy Javert
- Raymond Walsh as Grantaire
- Craig Mather as Combeferre
- Vinny Coyle as Feuilly
- Niall Sheehy as Courfeyrac
- Ciaran Joyce as Joly
- James Nicholson as Jean Prouvaire
- Andrew York as Lesgles
- Gavin James as Factory Foreman
- Celia Graham as Factory Girl
- Leo Roberts as Brujon
- Stephen Matthews as Babet
- Oliver Jackson as Claquesous
- Adam Bayjou as Montparnasse
- Tamsin Dowsett as Locket Crone
- Grainne Renihan as Hair Crone
- Samantha Dorsey, Holly-Anne Hull, Rosa O'Reilly and Sophie Reeves as Lovely Ladies
- Rosanna Bates, Nicola Espallardo and Gemma Wardle as Factory Workers

== Encore ==
At the end of the final performance, Michael Ball announced that Bradley Jaden would be taking over the role of Javert in the new production. They then sang "Stars" together, as a duet. Next, Alfie Boe, who had performed in the concert, was joined by four other Jean Valjeans to sing "Bring Him Home": John Owen-Jones who shared the role with Boe, Jon Robyns from the new London cast, Dean Chisnall from the 2019 tour, and Killian Donnelly who Chisnall replaced in the tour. After speeches from Cameron Mackintosh and Claude-Michel Schönberg, the performance concluded with the ensemble performing "One Day More".

== Home media ==
The Staged Concert was released digitally on 20 April 2020 in the UK and Australia, with a twice-delayed DVD and Blu-ray following on 2 November 2020 in the UK, having originally been scheduled for release on 6 April and then 20 April.

The film was released digitally in North America on 4 August 2020.

== See also ==
- Les Misérables (musical)
- Les Misérables: The Dream Cast in Concert (1995)
- Les Misérables in Concert: The 25th Anniversary (2010)
- Adaptations of Les Misérables
