= Cameron Blakely =

British actor

Cameron Blakely is a British actor. A veteran of musical theatre, he has appeared in numerous productions across the UK since his stage debut, and he was nominated for the Whatsonstage Awards in 2002 for his performance in Where's Charley at the Regents Park Open Air Theatre. More recently, he has appeared in Eugenius!, Into the Woods, Oliver!, How to Succeed in Business Without Really Trying, Rock of Ages, Les Misérables, The Addams Family, Mrs. Doubtfire, Newsies and Something Rotten!. He also appeared in Les Misérables in Concert: The 25th Anniversary and Les Misérables: The Staged Concert. As of April 2025, he's starring as Harold Zidler in the world tour of Moulin Rouge!.
