= Jac Yarrow =

Welsh actor and singer

- Born: March 11, 1998 (age 28); Cardiff, Wales
- Occupations: Actor, singer
- Years active: 2019–present

Jac Yarrow (born March 11, 1998) is a Welsh stage actor and singer born in Cardiff.

Yarrow attended Arts Educational Schools, where he originated the role of Jack Kelly in Disney’s Newsies in the UK. Yarrow graduated early in 2019. His first West End role was the title role in Joseph and the Amazing Technicolor Dreamcoat in 2019 at the London Palladium opposite Jason Donovan and Sheridan Smith. For his role, Yarrow was nominated for the 2020 Olivier Award for Best Actor In A Musical, Whatsonstage Awards in the same category and won The Stage Best West End Debut 2019. Following this, Yarrow appeared for two Christmas seasons (2020/2021) at the London Palladium playing himself. He reprised his role in Joseph in the summer of 2021, this time opposite pop star Alexandra Burke. Yarrow also played the role in the 2022 UK & Ireland tour and at The Princess Of Wales Theatre in Toronto, Canada in 2023. Also in 2023, he starred alongside Broadway legends Bernadette Peters and Lea Salonga in Stephen Sondheim’s Old Friends, directed by Sir Matthew Bourne at the Geilgud Theatre in the West End.

Yarrow went on to portray the title role in Pippin 50th Anniversary concert at Theatre Royal Drury Lane in the West End opposite Tony Award winner Alex Newell. Yarrow is currently playing the role of Marius in Les Misérables: The Arena Spectacular World Tour, having played the role for a four week summer run at the Sondheim Theatre in London in 2024.

On screen, Yarrow appeared as bad boy Jamie Dalton in BAFTA winning BBC drama In My Skin in 2020. Television credits also include Angelo Bernadone in Glow and Darkness (Dreamlight Productions), BBC’s Musicals The Greatest Show (2020), a guest performer on Britain’s Got Talent (ITV), This Morning (ITV) and The One Show (BBC).

== Acting credits ==
=== Theatre ===
Year(s)	Production	Role	Location
2019	Joseph and the Amazing Technicolor Dreamcoat	Joseph	London Palladium, West End
2021	Joseph and the Amazing Technicolor Dreamcoat	Joseph	London Palladium, West End
2021-2022	Pantoland at the Palladium	Principal Boy	London Palladium, West End
2022	Joseph and the Amazing Technicolor Dreamcoat	Joseph	UK National Tour
2022-2023	Joseph and the Amazing Technicolor Dreamcoat	Joseph	Princess of Wales Theatre, Canada
2023-2024	Stephen Sondheim's Old Friends	Featured Performer	Gielgud Theatre, West End
2024	Pippin	Pippin	Theatre Royal Drury Lane, West End
2024	Les Misérables	Marius Pontmercy	Sondheim Theatre, West End
2024-2025	Les Misérables	Marius Pontmercy	Arena Spectacular World Tour
2025	Les Misérables	Marius Pontmercy	Sondheim Theatre, West End
2026	Les Misérables	Marius Pontmercy	Arena Spectacular World Tour
2026	Les Misérables	Marius Pontmercy	Royal Albert Hall
2026	Les Misérables	Marius Pontmercy	Radio City Music Hall
