= Peter Lockyer =

American actor

- Born: Poughkeepsie, New York
- Occupation(s): Actor, singer
- Spouse: Melanie Mariko Tojio

Peter Lockyer is an American actor and tenor. He was born in Poughkeepsie, New York. As a child, he split his time between Toronto and Connecticut, and went to the same high school as the actress Gretchen Mol. Lockyer has appeared in numerous Broadway productions, including Miss Saigon as Chris Scott, Chicago as Billy Flynn, The Phantom of the Opera as Ubaldo Piangi and as a Phantom/Raoul/Andre understudy, Les Misérables as Marius Pontmercy and La Boheme as a Rodolfo understudy on Broadway. He has also appeared in the 25th anniversary US tour of Les Misérables as Jean Valjean (he reprised the role from 2014 to 2016 at the Queen's Theatre in London's West End). He appeared on TV with Bette Midler in a 1993 adaption of Gypsy.

After a break in performing, during which he earned dual master's degrees, qualifying him to teach in New York City, Lockyer returned to acting for the European tour of Barbra Streisand's Broadway Boys. He has also performed in 42nd Street in Europe and Les Misérables in China and South Korea. Recently, Lockyer returned to his native Connecticut to play the role of Tom in The Glass Menagerie at the historical Ivoryton Playhouse. Years before he played the role on tour, he played Valjean in a Hawaiian production of Les Misérables, which he directed himself.
