= Kerrie Anne Greenland =

Australian actress

- Born: 6 September
- Occupations: Actress, singer, dancer
- Years active: 2013–present
- Notable work: Éponine in Les Miserables

Kerrie Anne Greenland is an Australian actress and singer, known for performances in musical theatre. She won the Helpmann Award for Best Female Actor in a Supporting Role in a Musical for her portrayal of Éponine in the 2014 Australian version of Les Miserables and Ellen in the 2023 Australian version of Miss Saigon.

== Career ==
Greenland graduated from the Western Australian Academy of Performing Arts in 2012, before making her professional debut as Éponine in the 2014 Australian revival of Les Miserables. For this role she received the Helpmann Award for Best Female Actor in a Supporting Role in a Musical. She went on to perform the same role in the show's International Tour (Manila and Singapore) in 2016. Subsequent roles included Violet Hilton in Side Show at the Hayes Theatre in Sydney and Cassandra in Paris: A Rock Oddysey.

Greenland released her debut album, Pictures, in March 2016, and staged a related solo concert, Pictures: Songs from Movie Musicals at Chapel Off Chapel Melbourne, on 2 June 2018. Later that year she toured Australia as Patsy Cline in Always... Patsy Cline, and in September she portrayed Esther Smith in musical theatre version of Meet Me in St. Louis. She also originated the character Dom, one of the leads in a new musical, The Things Between Us, which was staged in New Zealand.

Year	Title	Role	Notes	Ref(s)
2014–16	Les Miserables	Éponine	Australian/Asian tour	
2016	Side Show	Violet Hilton	Hayes Theatre, Sydney	
2017	Paris	Cassandra	Melbourne Recital Centre, Melbourne	
2017	The Things Between Us	Dom	Christchurch Arts Festival	
2018	Always... Patsy Cline	Patsy Cline	Australia	
2018	Meet Me in St. Louis	Ester Smith	Hayes Theatre, Sydney	
2019	Everything's Coming Up Sondheim	herself	Chapel Off Chapel, Melbourne	
2023–24	Miss Saigon	Ellen	Australian tour	
