= Chapel Off Chapel =

Theatre Venue

Coordinates: 37°50′51.461″S 144°59′43.879″E

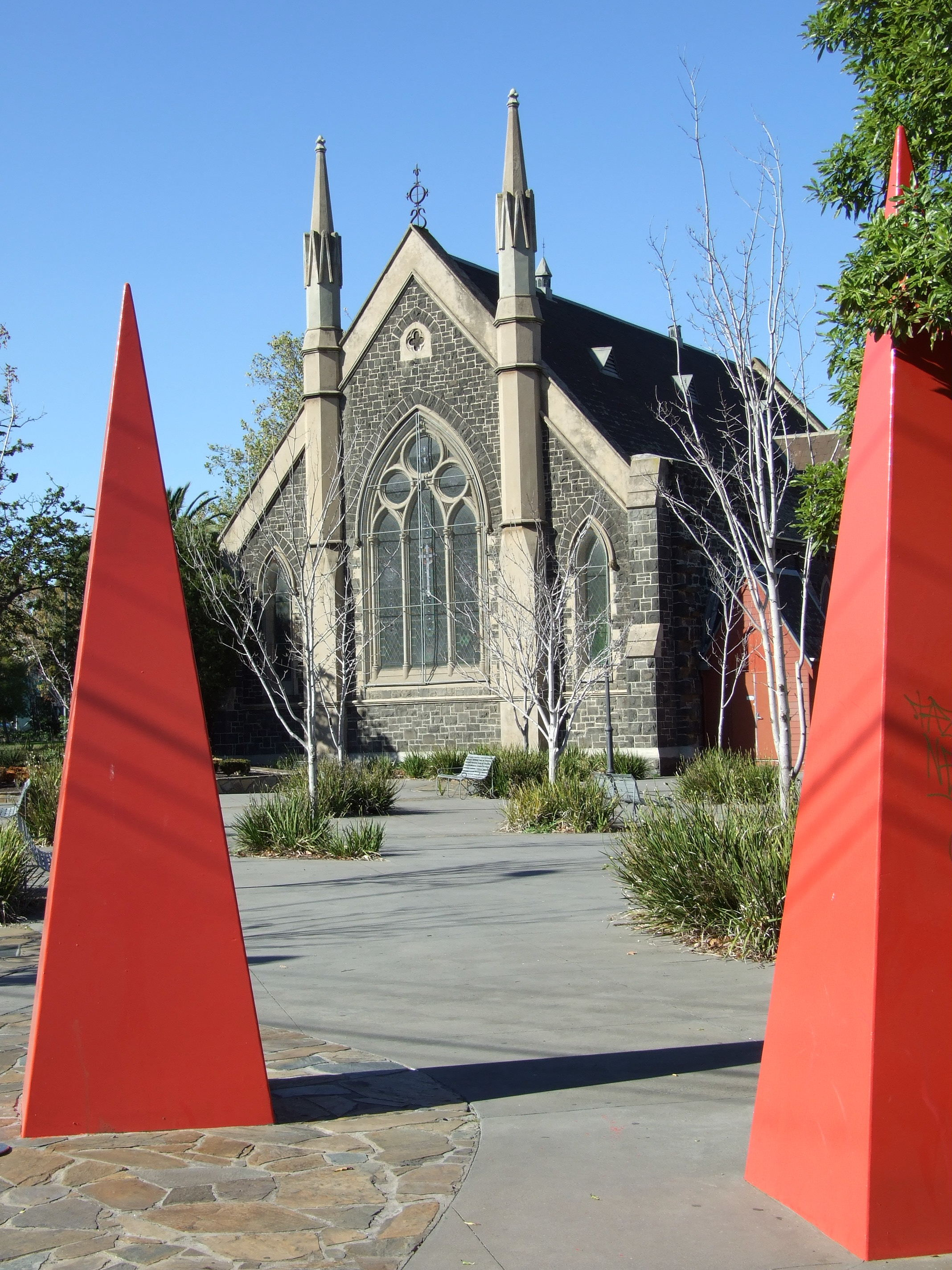
- View of Chapel Off Chapel from Malvern Road
- Interactive map of Chapel Off Chapel
- Former names: Independent Church of Prahran
- Address: 12 Little Chapel Street; Prahran, Melbourne, Australia
- Owner: City of Stonnington
- Capacity: Theatre: 255 seats Loft: 150 seats
- Type: Theatre
- Events: Theatre, music, cabaret

Construction
- Opened: 1995

Website
- chapeloffchapel.com.au

Chapel Off Chapel is a theatre venue in Prahran, Melbourne. Located near Chapel Street and opened in 1995, the venue consists of the 255-seat Chapel Theatre, the 150-seat Chapel Loft and a visual arts gallery.

Chapel Off Chapel is particularly associated with independent music theatre and cabaret. It has hosted independent productions of musicals, many as Australian premieres, including Dogfight, tick, tick... BOOM!, Violet, The Color Purple, Thrill Me, John & Jen, Avenue Q, In the Heights, Loving Repeating, Blood Brothers, Hair, It's Only Life!, Gutenberg! The Musical!, Zanna, Don't!, Is There Life After High School?, Bat Boy, I Love You, You're Perfect, Now Change, The Last 5 Years, Hello Again, Songs for a New World, Kooky Tunes, And The World Goes Round, Putting It Together, Lucky Stiff and Closer Than Ever.

Australian musicals performed at Chapel Off Chapel include Prodigal Son, Life's A Circus, Only Heaven Knows, Tea with Oscar, Joe Starts Again and All Het Up. Chapel Off Chapel also regularly hosts Home Grown, a showcase for new Australian musical theatre works. Performers who have appeared at Home Grown events include Todd McKenney, Amanda Harrison, Lucy Durack, Virginia Gay and Kerrie Anne Greenland.

The bluestone building is converted from the former Independent Church, built in 1858-9.
