= Samantha Hill (actress) =

Canadian actress and singer

- Born: Samantha Jeanne Hill; Winnipeg, Manitoba, Canada
- Education: University of Alberta (BFA 2011); University of Winnipeg (BA 2008)
- Occupations: Singer, actress
- Website: www.samanthajeannehill.com

Samantha Hill is a Canadian singer and actress who is most known for having starred in the Broadway shows Les Misérables and The Phantom of the Opera.

== Career ==
Samantha began her career early by participating in musical and theatrical projects at her church. As a teenager, she was trained in ballet, jazz, theatre, and musical theatre. She trained as an actor at the University of Alberta in Edmonton, Alberta, where she graduated with the Bachelor of Fine Arts in 2011, and at the University of Winnipeg, where she earned her Bachelor of Arts in Theatre/Film in 2008.

Samantha took up roles in numerous musicals such as Spring Awakening in 2011 and Annie in 2012, before making her Broadway debut in The Phantom of the Opera as Christine Daaé in 2012. She was the alternate in the role until the departure of Sierra Boggess, and then went on to star until July 2013. She left The Phantom of the Opera to play Cosette in the Toronto production of Les Misérables, which led to her being cast in the same role for the 2014 Broadway revival. She earned critical acclaim for this role, both from press as well as from fans of the show.
