= Nathania Ong =

Singaporean actress and singer (born 1998)

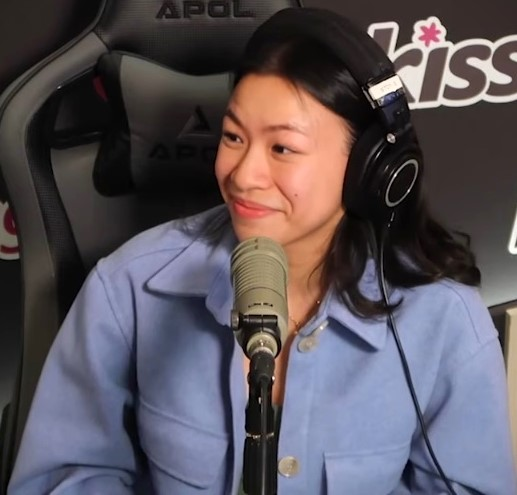
- Ong interviewed by Kiss92 FM in 2023
- Born: 1998 (age 28)
- Education: Lasalle College of the Arts (one year); Mountview Academy of Theatre Arts (BA)
- Occupations: Actress; Singer
- Years active: 2021–present
- Parents: Kevin Ong (father); Jenny Ong (mother)
- Musical career
- Genres: Musical theatre
- Instrument: Vocals

Nathania Ong (born 1998) is a Singaporean actress and singer. A graduate of the Mountview Academy of Theatre Arts, she made her West End debut in 2021 as Jenna Rolan in Be More Chill.

== Early life and education ==
Ong was born in 1998 to dentist and former a cappella singer Kevin Ong and homemaker Jenny Ong. She has three older sisters. Ong enjoyed performing from a young age and often performed at City Harvest Church concerts, but only began to be formally trained in singing at age 11.

In 2004, Ong sang "Home" with her older sister and S.R. Nathan for a Total Defence Day event, which inspired her interest in performance. In 2010, Ong led the singing of Singapore's national anthem at the closing ceremony of the Youth Olympic Games.

Ong received her primary education at Methodist Girls' School. She was a member of the Drama Elective Programme at Anglo-Chinese Junior College. After completing her Singapore-Cambridge GCE Advanced Level examinations in 2017, she applied to study at five drama schools, and flew to the United Kingdom for auditioning, but was rejected by all of them. Ong described it as an emotionally low point, and returned to Singapore after financial difficulties in London. She then enrolled at a three-year musical theatre course at Lasalle College of the Arts in Singapore. After a year, Mountview Academy of Theatre Arts held auditions in Singapore, offering 38 spots, to which she applied on the last day after much consideration about finances and commitment. After being accepted out of around 2000 applicants, she switched schools, moving to the United Kingdom. She worked three-part time jobs to afford her trip. In 2021, she graduated from Mountview Academy of Theatre Arts in London.

== Career ==
She made her West End debut in 2021 as Jenna Rolan in Be More Chill. The same year, she played Éponine in the UK and Ireland tour of Les Misérables, despite not having seen the musical prior to auditioning for the role. In 2022, she played Éponine in the West End production. She returned to Singapore in 2023 to play Cinderella in a local adaptation of Into the Woods, after they garnered interest in 2021 through a recommendation by Zachary Pang, a fellow student, after performing Candide at Mountview Academy of Theatre Arts. In 2024, she was cast as Eliza in the West End production of Hamilton at the Victoria Palace Theatre. In 2026, she was included in the Forbes 30 Under 30 list. She played Elle Woods in the Singapore Repertory Theatre's production of Legally Blonde from 29 July 2026.

In December 2023, she held a concert, titled Spirit of Giving: Nathania Ong – A Musical Homecoming, in collaboration with The Business Times and the Singapore Performing Arts Academy, to raise money for disadvantaged youth pursuing arts. It included a pre-show segment showcasing young musicians and singers.

== Stage credits ==
Year	Title	Role	Venue	Ref.
2021	Be More Chill	Jenna Rolan	Shaftesbury Theatre	
2021–2022	Les Misérables	Éponine	UK and Ireland Tour	
2022–2023	Les Misérables	Éponine	Sondheim Theatre	
2023	Into the Woods	Cinderella	Singtel Waterfront Theatre	
2024	Les Misérables	Éponine	Arena World Tour	
2024–2025	Hamilton	Eliza	Victoria Palace Theatre	
2025–2026	Les Misérables	Éponine	Arena World Tour	
2026	Legally Blonde	Elle Woods	Esplanade Theatre	
