= Susan Jane Tanner =

British actress

- Other name: Sue Jane Tanner
- Occupation: Actress
- Years active: 1981–present

Susan Jane Tanner (or Sue Jane Tanner) is an English theatre actress, best known for playing the role of Madame Thénardier in the original London cast of Les Misérables and Jellylorum in the original London version of Cats. She reprised her role in the 1998 video version. Tanner also spent a season with the Royal Shakespeare Company, with roles including Audrey in As You Like It and Mrs Peacham in The Beggar's Opera.

She currently lives in Dorset with her husband.

== Selected works ==
=== Theatre ===
Year	Production	Role	Original theatre
1981	Cats	Jellylorum and Griddlebone	New London Theatre
1983	All's Well That Ends Well	Violenta	Martin Beck Theatre
1985	Les Misérables	Mme. Thénardier	Barbican Theatre
1990	As You Like It	Jacques	Everyman Theatre, Liverpool
1996	Martin Guerre	Madame De Rols	Prince Edward Theatre
2000	Hard Times (musical)	Miss Fidget/Mrs Sparsit	Theatre Royal Haymarket
2008	Gone with the Wind	Aunt Pittypat	New London Theatre

=== Films ===
Year	Production	Role	Notes
1998	Cats	Jellylorum	
