= René-Louis Baron =

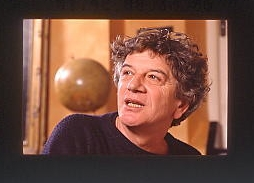
- René-Louis Baron (1998).

Background information
- Also known as: René Baron
- Born: 9 February 1944 Romans-sur-Isère, France
- Died: 20 May 2016 (aged 72) Saint-Hilaire-les-Andrésis, France
- Genres: Classic, pop, and algorithmic music
- Occupation(s): Musicologist, musician, singer-songwriter
- Instrument(s): Clarinet, piano, vocal
- Years active: 1958–present
- Website: www.realcomposer.com

René-Louis Baron (9 February 1944 – 20 May 2016) is a French inventor, author and songwriter. He was 14 years old when he played for the first time on stage as a jazz clarinettist. Later, in 1978, he began in Paris a career as a solo singer.

In 1980, he began to use computers to record his music for films, advertising, large companies, theatres, singers and art galleries as well as his song-poems.

In 1989, he, a self-taught eclectic, began his own research into algorithmic composition and thus, musical artificial intelligence. In 1998, he filed the first patent for automatic musical composition at the National Industrial Property Institute in Paris.

== Early career ==
While studying clarinet at the Conservatory of Music in his hometown, René-Louis Baron was quickly drawn to jazz. His first stage appearance was at age 14, with a New Orleans style band. From 1960 to 1974, he sang hit songs with various Lyonnais bands, such as Jean Trial, Pol Malburet, Eddie Léo and Maurice de Thou, mainly in south-eastern France.

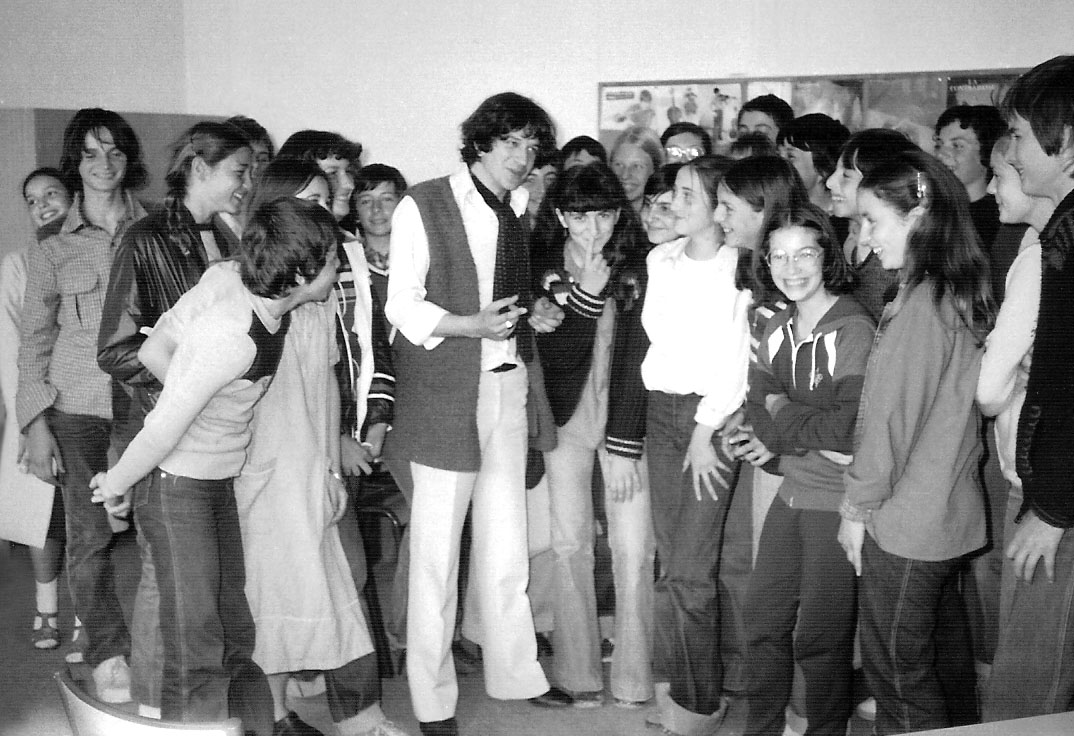
RLBaron speaking about creativity at "College André Malraux" in Romans-sur-Isère (France).

He shared his passion for creativity with students by visiting schools and giving seminars. He introduced students to Alex Osborn and the technique of brainstorming in the field of artistic creation.

His songwriting and performing period began in Paris in 1978 with the release of his first album of musical poetry Baron chante Cousin et Dorigné.

=== Composer's path ===
Gabriel Cousin was a French poet and playwright. His abrupt form of writing and his very personal creative metaphorical style greatly influenced Baron.

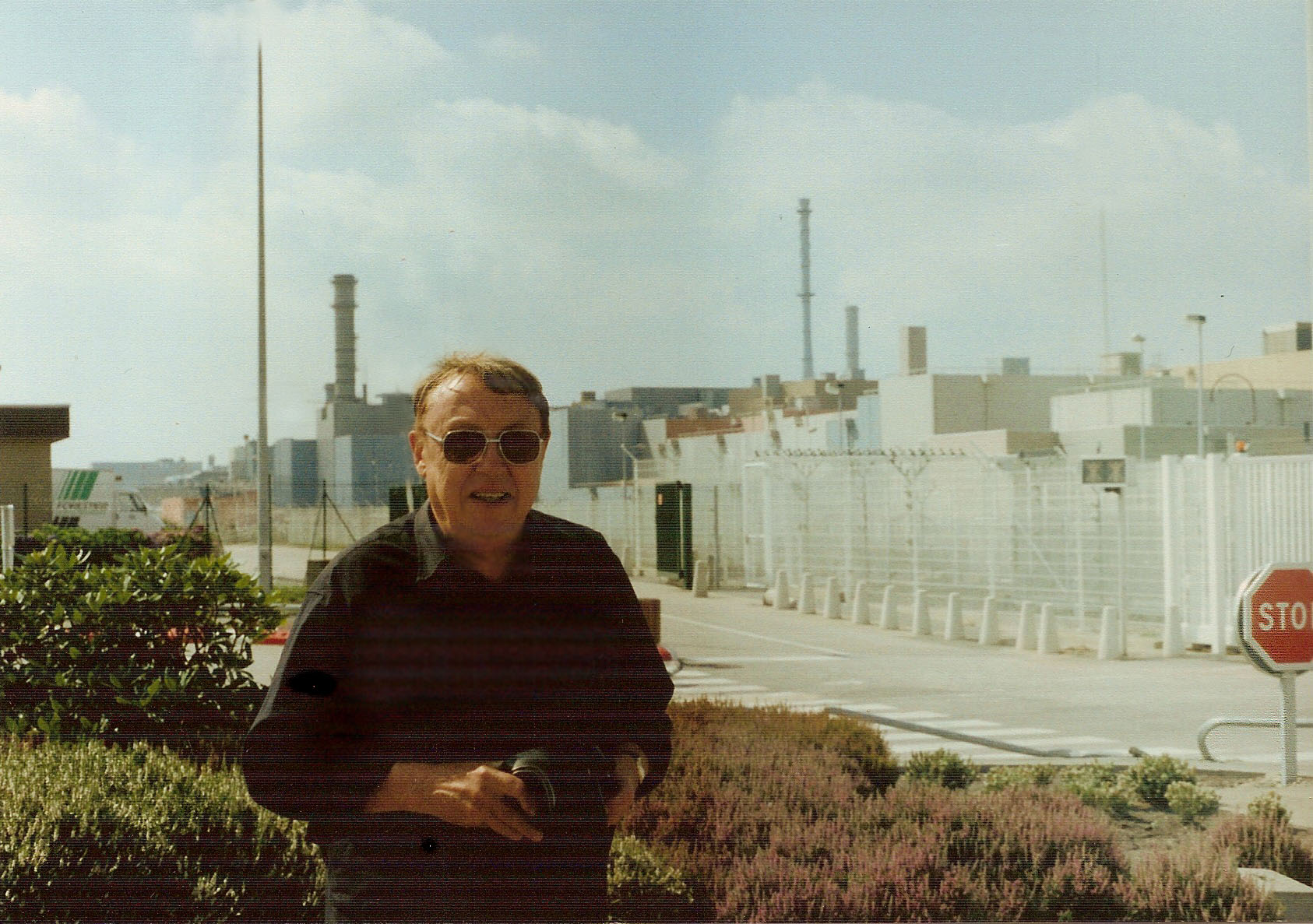
Michel Dorigné, author of the song "J'agonise".

Michel Dorigné was a poet, playwright and musicologist. The diversity of topics and flexibility of his writing, in particular "J'agonise": "We've lowered our Gods from heaven ...", its clever allegories that can mix a scathing first degree: "The stripper ate too much...", have greatly inspired the composer. They collaborated closely until the poet's death in 2009.

In 1980, Iris Clert created the C.A.R.A.T. (Centre for Art Animation and transcendental Research) in Neuilly-sur-Seine, the final manifestation of her inclination to irony and unconventionality. She then organized an exhibition of paintings by Louise Barbu and diffused continuously Boushaâme, a sonorous fresco (specially composed by RLBaron) which offers a musical view about the painter's work. The composer continues in this vein with the works of the Serbian painter and sculptor Milos Sobaïc about whom Peter Handke wrote an essay which Alain Jouffroy produced in a monograph (book of art of his artistic work).

René-Louis Baron performed in cabarets, café-theatres, cultural centres and then sang while playing the piano at the Olympia de Paris.

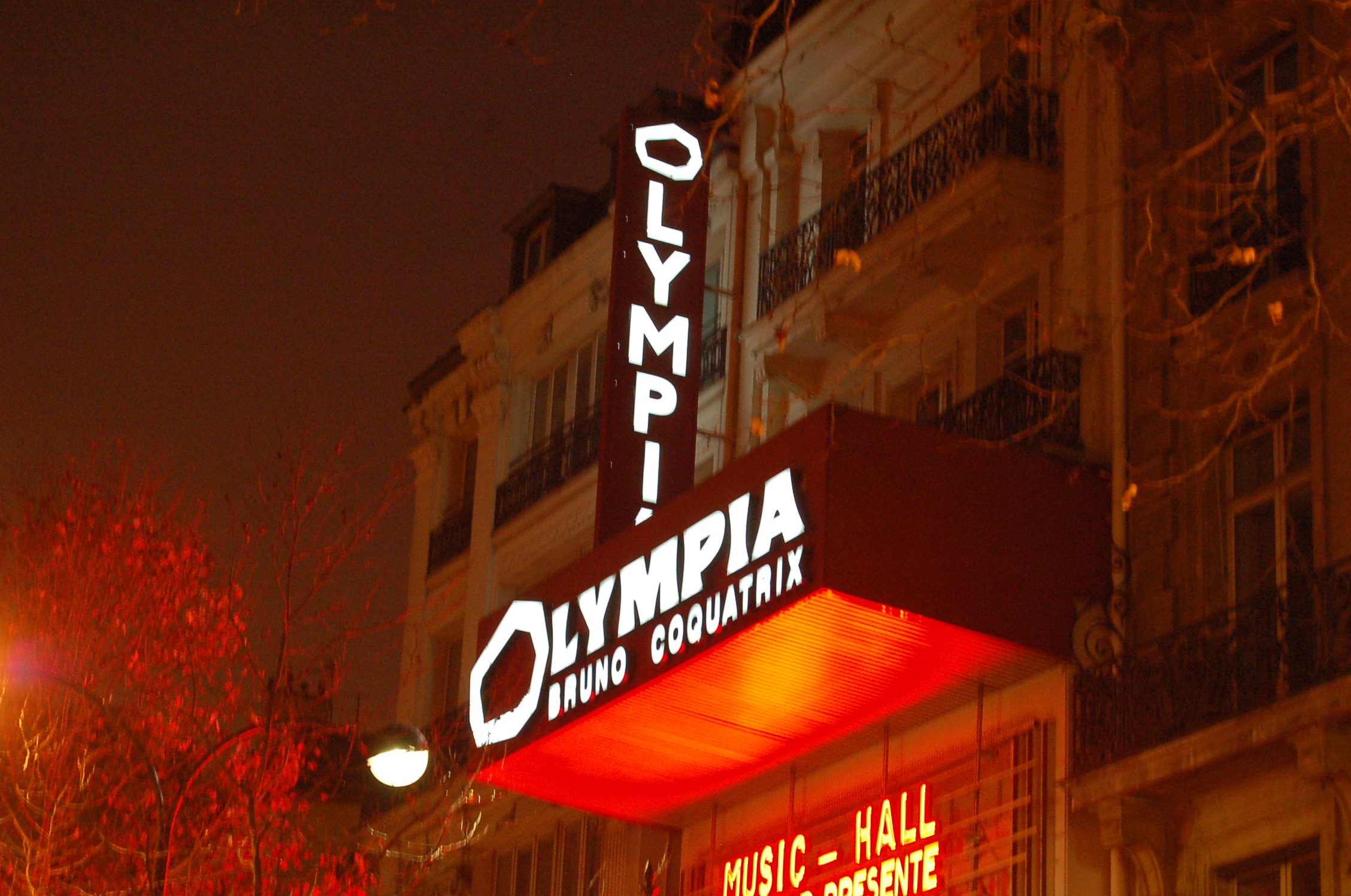
Salle de spectacle : Olympia de Paris (France).

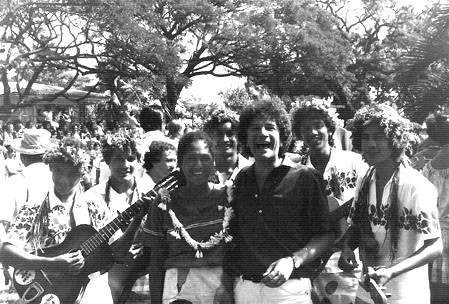
1984-Récitals of René-Louis Baron in Tahiti (Polynésie française).

In 1989 he returned to sing at the Olympia with artists including Michel Legrand, the Chorale Populaire de Paris, for the gala event to benefit victims of the Armenian earthquake of 1988. He then worked with various French record labels including Carrere Records.

Israel Baker, "Head of the desks of strings" in major productions of American movies, for example Yentl where he is directed by the music composer of the film: Michel Legrand. After hearing Baron sing in a restaurant near the Champs Elysees, Israel Baker invited him to produce his recital in Hollywood in a private tavern frequented by the greatest actors. He was then hired by James Salmon (later Minister of the French Polynesia Government) and Alain Deviegre, the theater director in OTAC (Office Territorial d'Action Culturelle), to sing in Papeete (Tahiti), French Polynesia.

As early as 1980, and for over ten years, thanks to the advent of MIDI music synthesizers, Atari and Cubase, he became an independent producer. He has composed over one hundred and fifty film scores including those under the pseudonym of René-Luis Baron: The Man from Nowhere (1989). He has also composed for commercials, for large companies (Aerospatiale, Camel (cigarette), Marlboro, Dassault Aviation, Electricite de France, Gaz de France, Michelin, etc..) and other cultural and educational events such as Guernica and Picasso by Bertrand Borie.

== Inventor's path ==
In 1989, at the age of 45 and parallel to his artistic activities, René-Louis Baron taught computer programming and he was particularly interested in artistic AI (artificial intelligence), discipline sometimes included in Generative art. His first attempts involved the automatic creation of church windows, synopses of films to arrive on an algorithmic music research.

His work is not to get a new experimental music (field widely explored by IRCAM in France), but rather melodious music or popular music. Heights and lengths of the notes of the melody are generated randomly but depending on harmonic and rhythmic constraints according with the desired musical style. The orchestration of each melody depends on created melody and arbitrary decisions according to the desired musical style. Subsequently, his research focused on modal music then tonal music which is much more complicated and lastly Contrepoint.

In 1992, the sources of its various computer programs were beginning to be subjected to successive deposits of copyrights including A.P.P.(Paris-France). René-Louis Baron deposed in 1998 at the INPI, the first patent which is a method and a device for automatic and coherent music composition (without any human intervention).

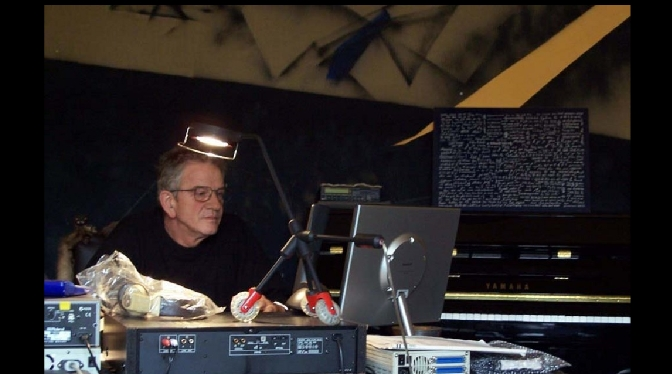
Rene-Louis Baron, creator of "MEDALComposer"

In order to conclude an agreement with the multinational Thomson Multimedia, the inventor is forced to create in 2000 a commercial company called "Medal SARL". The new company acquired the patent Baron for one symbolic euro then signed a licensed agreement with Thomson multimedia. From 2001 to 2003, the inventor has worked two years with the Research Centre Thomson Cesson-Sevigne (near Rennes) and with the Thomson Research Center of Indianapolis in the United States. The Thomson society then conceded a number of sub-licensing including the Japanese company NEC Corporation under the name "Mithic", the name given to the invention by Thomson in the field of mobile telephony.

2003: The French government sold its last shares in Thomson multimedia, which then stopped all activity in the sector of new media services "(3D TV, automatic music (Medalmusic), electronic book, etc.).

2006: After lengthy negotiations, the company of the inventor: Medal SARL, finds himself owner of all international patents Medal.

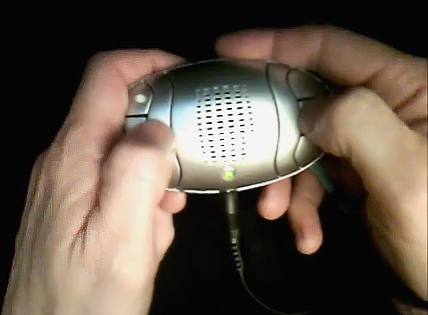
Lodyone player (2012)

2007: Under the guidance and with the help of Laurent Cauvin, sound engineer, electronic engineer, computer scientist (formerly Thomson multimedia) and three sons of the inventor, Frederic Baron (composer and company director), Stephane Baron (designer) and Alexandre Baron (sculptor and webmaster) Medal Society Ltd. undertakes research and development work to enable the realization of a new generation of musical and interactive microship using the method of the invention. 2008: Medal-Composer was presented in the news on France3 TV and raised questions concerning copyrights for musical works created due to the invention. This is starting to interest media net.

2009: An approach to global marketing of this interactive music composer embedded in a microship is operated from France by the company Techlody SAS, a society under the chairmanship of Frederic Baron.

2013: First marketed application: "LODYONE", a new musical instrument.

== Auditorium : Music composition by "MedalComposer" ==
"Piano romantique"
(Robot MedalComposer)

"Guitare sèche"
(Robot MedalComposer)

"New York City"
(Robot MedalComposer)

"Fonction Multi-Morphing"
(Robot MedalComposer)

== Awards ==
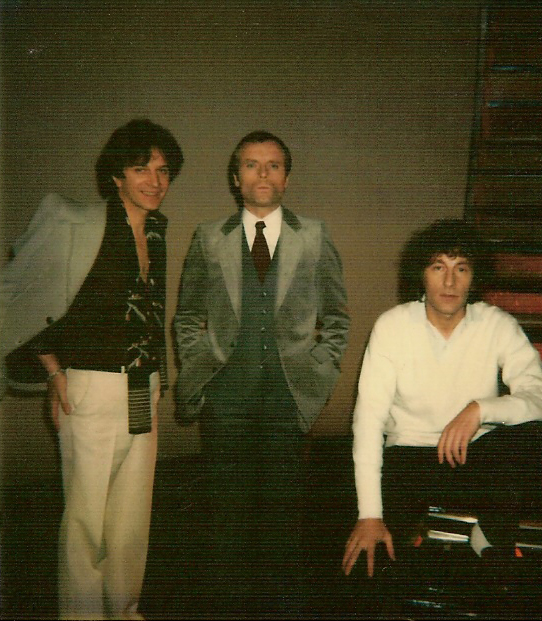
1979– Pierre Douglas (Centre) presents René-Louis Baron (Left) and Alain Souchon on the French TV channel TF1.

1978: He was named "Discovery TF1" (French TV) with the song "Les Lilas de Ville d'Avray" (a tribute to Boris Vian). This award allows him to be frequently invited on this channel. He appeared every night at the cabaret "Le Don Camilo" with Jack Hammer who was singing with the vocal group The Platters and author of the rock tune Great Balls of Fire performed by numerous artists including Jerry Lee Lewis. Jack Hammer then wrote the English version of a song by Baron "Cabot" which renamed "Perfume".

1980: At the Palais des Sports in Paris, Robert Hossein staged the works of Victor Hugo: Les Miserables. In agreement with the composer of the musics, Claude-Michel Schoenberg, he gave René Baron aka René-Louis Baron, the role of Combeferre (student revolutionary and Marius's friend).

1980: He received at the Olympia de Paris, the Top prize of Artistic Vocation from Le CLub des Onze created by Bruno Coquatrix. He is awarded by a jury grouping Jean Wiener, Jean Dréjac, Marcel Auriac, André Hornez, Nina Valente, Henri Kubnick and Georges Auric ("Group of Six" member with Darius Milhaud, Arthur Honegger, Germaine Tailleferre, Francis Poulenc, Louis Durey). This group of famous composers of the twentieth century is also referred to as "Les Six". Then, in 1982: He was awarded Green Hexagon by FR3- (French TV) at "Midem" in Cannes (France) with the song Grenoble la Grise.

1983: He was named "Espoir Antenne 2" (TV) of the "World Festival of French Song" in Juan-les-Pins (France) with his tune La Rue des Silences.
