= Jean Vallée =

Jean Vallée may refer to:

- Jean Vallée (director) (1899–1979), French film director and screenwriter
- Jean Vallée (singer) (1941–2014), Belgian singer and songwriter

== See also ==
- Jean-Marc Vallée (1963–2021), Canadian filmmaker
- Jean de la Vallée (c. 1620–1696), French-born Swedish architect
