= Les Misérables (1982 film) =

- Film poster
- Directed by: Robert Hossein
- Written by: Alain Decaux; Robert Hossein; Victor Hugo
- Based on: Les Misérables; 1862 novel by Victor Hugo
- Produced by: Dominique Harisparu; Sophie von Uslar
- Starring: Lino Ventura
- Cinematography: Edmond Richard
- Edited by: Martine Barraqué; Sophie Bhaud
- Music by: André Hossein; Michel Magne
- Distributed by: GEF-CCFC
- Release date: 20 October 1982
- Running time: 200 minutes
- Country: France
- Language: French

Les Misérables is a 1982 French drama film directed by Robert Hossein. It is one of the numerous screen adaptations of the 1862 novel of the same name by Victor Hugo. It was entered into the 13th Moscow International Film Festival where it won a Special Prize.

== Cast ==
- Lino Ventura as Jean Valjean
- Michel Bouquet as Inspecteur Javert
- Évelyne Bouix as Fantine
- Christiane Jean as Cosette
  - Valentine Bordelet as Cosette (child)
- Jean Carmet as Thénardier
- Françoise Seigner as La Thénardier
- Frank David as Marius
- Candice Patou as Éponine
  - Agathe Ladner as Éponine (child)
- Emmanuel Curtil as Gavroche
- Hervé Furic as Enjolras (as Hervé Fulric)
- Louis Seigner as Monseigneur Myriel
- Fernand Ledoux as Gillenormand
- Paul Préboist as Fauchelevent
- Corinne Dacla as Azelma
  - Catherine Di Rigo as Azelma (child) (as Kathleen Di Rigo)
- Robin Renucci as Courfeyrac
- Christian Benedetti as Combeferre (as Christian Bénédetti)
- Tony Joudrier as Bossuet
- Christophe Odent as Bahorel
- Alexandre Tamar as Grantaire
- Roger Hanin as L'aubergiste
- Nathalie Nerval as La fille Gillenormand
- Martine Pascal as La mère supérieure
- Aline Bertrand as Mme Magloire
- Madeleine Bouchez as Mlle Baptistine
- Viviane Elbaz as Soeur Simplice
- Dominique Davray as La Magnon
- Claude Lancelot as Bamatabois
- Denis Lavant as Montparnasse
- Jean-René Gossart as Claquesous (as Jean-René Gossard)
- Jacques Blal as Petit Gervais
- Dominique Zardi as Chenildieu

== Differences from the novel ==
- The film starts with Valjean's release from prison, which is followed by the opening credits and then jumps to the presentation of the bishop, which is at beginning of the novel.
- Javert is shown (though not named) in the opening scene; the book introduces him in Montreuil.
- Fantine is introduced in Montreuil; her former life in Paris is left out.
- Fantine dies of her illness before Javert arrives to arrest Valjean. In the book, it is the shock of realizing that Cosette did not arrive, and Javert telling her Valjean's real identity, that kills her.
- Valjean is not sent back to the galleys; he manages to escape Javert after Fantine's death.
- Valjean's escape from the convent in a coffin is cut out.
- Valjean dies alone, making his death even more tragic.
- The last scene is a flashback to Valjean's release from prison, with a minor change in dialogue. The first time, Javert says, "You are free," and the second time, the line is, "Now, you are free."

=== Minor sub-plots ===
- Valjean's arrival in Digne is lengthily depicted; we even see him going into the town hall to have his passport signed.
- Petit-Gervais is included.
- We see Valjean lifting the cart off Fauchelevent, and we also learn that he sent him to the convent in Paris afterwards.
- One of the few adaptions that does not change the names of the three convicts who recognize Valjean (Brevet, Chenildieu and Cochepaille), and in which Valjean proves his identity in the same way as he does in the book.
- Valjean leaves the convent for the same reason as he does in the book.
- The attack in the House Gorbeau is included, and takes place in nearly exactly the same way as it does in the book.
- The romance between Marius and Cosette takes place in nearly the same way as in the book.
- Javert's letter to the Prefect is read aloud by Javert as we see him taking the coach towards the bridge.
- Valjean confesses his true identity to Marius after the wedding and dies of grief at the end.
- Most dialogue is taken word for word from the book.
- While some scenes are anachronistic (e.g. the prison), the overall impression is a very dark and sinister one, fitting the book very well.

== Notes ==
- Robert Hossein also directed the original 1980 Paris production of the musical: this film and the musical are the only adaptations where Fantine dies before Javert's arrival; the falling of the barricade is depicted in very slow motion as it is in the musical and Gavroche's song "C'est la faute à..." is sung to the same melody in this film as it is in the musical.
- The actor who plays Chenildieu in this adaption plays Cochepaille in the 2000 miniseries.

== Awards ==
=== César Awards (1983) ===
- Best Supporting Actor (Jean Carmet, won)
- Nominated :
  - Best Actor (Lino Ventura)
  - Best Adaptation (Robert Hossein)
  - Best Cinematography (Edmond Richard)
  - Best Production Design (François de Lamothe)

=== Moscow Film Festival (1983) ===
- Special prize, for the contribution to the cinema (Robert Hossein)

== See also ==
- Adaptations of Les Misérables
