= Les Misérables (2000 miniseries) =

2000 French miniseries

- Written by: Didier Decoin
- Directed by: Josée Dayan
- Starring: Gérard Depardieu; John Malkovich; Christian Clavier; Virginie Ledoyen; Enrico Lo Verso; Jeanne Moreau; Charlotte Gainsbourg; Veronica Ferres; Asia Argento
- Composer: Jean-Claude Petit
- Countries of origin: France; Italy; Germany
- Original language: French
- No. of series: 1
- No. of episodes: 4

Production
- Producers: Gérard Depardieu; Jean-Pierre Guérin; Doris Kirch
- Cinematography: Willy Stassen
- Editors: Adeline Yoyotte; Marie-Josèphe Yoyotte
- Running time: 360 minutes

Original release
- Release: September 4 – September 25, 2000

Les Misérables (English: "Wretched") is a 2000 French-Italian-German television miniseries based on the 1862 novel of the same name by Victor Hugo and starring Gérard Depardieu, John Malkovich, Christian Clavier and Virginie Ledoyen in main roles. A European co-production, it was broadcast in four ninety-minute parts.

== Synopsis ==
As in the novel, the storyline follows the adult life of Jean Valjean (Depardieu), an ex-convict pursued by police inspector Javert (Malkovich) and raising young Cosette (played as an adult by Ledoyen).

The adaptation makes large changes to the novel throughout, adding many subplots that were not present in the original story and radically altering characterizations. Some of the changes include adding a subplot where Javert goes undercover as a student in Marius's law school, and reimagining Cosette's maid Toussaint as a large mute male ex-convict manservant who eventually steals from Jean Valjean.

== Episodes ==
No.	Episode	Directed by	Written by	Original release date
1	Episode 1	Josée Dayan	Didier Decoin	September 4, 2000
Jean Valjean is released from prison on parole and finds life unbearable until Monseigneur Bienvenu covers his theft of silver and gives him two silver candle sticks. Valjean breaks his parole again but later makes a new life as a business man and ends up being elected Mayor. His life is busy and he is unaware that Fantine, a young woman who worked in his factory, has been fired and her difficult life as an unwed mother has gotten even worse. When it does come to his attention it is too late for Fantine, but he vows to care for her daughter.
2	Episode 2	Josée Dayan	Didier Decoin	September 11, 2000
The Thénardiers abuse Fantine's daughter Cosette and treat her like a servant. Valjean bargains with them for Cosette and they leave after he has paid for her. Valjean takes her to Paris to live in a convent where he takes on the role of the assistant gardener. They remain safely hidden until her schooling is finished. Valjean finds a residence in Paris, but before too long, runs into Thénardier and Javert, the inspector who has hunted him for years for breaking his parole.
3	Episode 3	Josée Dayan	Didier Decoin	September 18, 2000
The events of their lives are drawn into a student uprising. Cosette meets and falls for a young student, Marius. Valjean fears for their safety and his freedom and decides to leave Paris and head for England, but that is the night that the student take up arms. Marius and the other students face a city unwilling to help and soon realize their cause will die with them. After intercepting a message to Cosette from Marius, Valjean joins the students and rescues Marius when he is injured. Javert intercepts them, but lets them go, committing suicide shortly after.
4	Episode 4	Josée Dayan	Didier Decoin	September 25, 2000
As Marius and Cosette prepare for their wedding, Valjean tells Marius of his past and that he must leave. Marius does not stop him. Now alone, Valjean's health quickly deteriorates. But at the wedding, Thénardier shows up and tries sell Marius dirt on Valjean. Thénardier is convinced that Valjean killed a man the night the barricades fell, but the trinket he shows Marius belonged to Marius himself and he realizes that it was Valjean who rescued him. He and Cosette race to find Valjean, but by this time he is on his death bed. They arrive just in time to say their farewells. Note: The events of this part of the story are often omitted from theatrical versions of the story such as the 1935, 1952, and 1998 films.

== Cast ==
- Gérard Depardieu as Jean Valjean
  - Guillaume Depardieu as young Jean
- Christian Clavier as Thénardier
- John Malkovich as Javert
- Virginie Ledoyen as Cosette
  - Léopoldine Serre as younger Cosette
- Enrico Lo Verso as Marius Pontmercy
- Charlotte Gainsbourg as Fantine
- Asia Argento as Éponine Thénardier
  - Julia Portoghese as Éponine (age 9–11)
- Veronica Ferres as Madame Thénardier
- Jeanne Moreau as Mère Innocente
- Giovanna Mezzogiorno as Soeur Simplice
- Vadim Glowna as Fauchelevent
- Steffen Wink as Enjolras
- Jérôme Hardelay as Gavroche
- Michel Duchaussoy as Gillenormand
- Otto Sander as Monseigneur Bienvenu
- Christopher Thompson as Courfeyrac
- Franck Tordjman as Prouvaire
- Jérome Rebbot as Bahorel
- David Podracky as Grantaire
- François Hadji-Lazaro as Toussaint
- Sophie Milleron as Azelma Thénardier
- Maxime Leroux as Champmathieu
- François Négret as Claquesous
- Dominique Besnehard as Gueulemer
- Yves Penay as Babet
- Stephan Midaven as Montparnasse
- Patrick Bordier as Brujon
- Artus de Penguern as Chabouillet
- Dominique Zardi as Cochepaille
- Patrick Lambert as Chenildieu
- Vincent Schmitt as Bamatabois
- Enguerran Demeulenaere as Petit Gervais
- Denis Podalydès as Scaufflaire
- Michel Pilorgé as Dumoncel
- Babsie Steger as Fantine's friend

== Home media ==
France

- DVD release: November 8, 2000
- Feature length: 360 minutes
- Language: French, no subtitles
- Discs: 2

United Kingdom

- DVD release: September 20, 2004
- Feature length: 171 minutes
- Language: English
- Discs: 1

United States

- DVD release: June 29, 2011
- Feature length: 180 minutes
- Language: English
- Discs: 1

== See also ==
- Adaptations of Les Misérables
