= Les Misérables: Shōjo Cosette =

Japanese anime series

- Title card
- レ・ミゼラブル 少女コゼット
- Genre: Drama, historical fiction
- Based on: Les Misérables by Victor Hugo
- Written by: Tomoko Konparu
- Directed by: Hiroaki Sakurai
- Music by: Hayato Matsuo
- Country of origin: Japan
- Original language: Japanese
- No. of episodes: 52

Production
- Executive producer: Kōichi Motohashi
- Producers: Yukihiro Ito; Koji Yamamoto; Michio Kato; Kenichi Sato
- Production companies: Fuji Television; Nippon Animation

Original release
- Network: BS Fuji
- Release: January 7 – December 30, 2007

Les Misérables: Shōjo Cosette (レ・ミゼラブル 少女コゼット, Re Mizeraburu Shōjo Kozetto; lit. "Les Misérables: Little Girl Cosette") is a Japanese anime series produced by Nippon Animation, and the first installment in the World Masterpiece Theater series in ten years after Remi, Nobody's Girl. It is an adaptation of Victor Hugo's classic 1862 novel Les Misérables, and the fourth anime adaptation of said novel (following two adaptations from the Japanese television program Manga Sekai Mukashi Banashi, and a 1979 TV film special produced by Toei Animation).

It premiered across Japan on January 7, 2007, on Fuji TV's BS Fuji broadcast satellite network, and contains twenty-six episodes each season, for a total of fifty-two episodes. It also aired in Japan on Animax beginning in April 2007.

== Plot ==
Set in nineteenth century-era France, the series begins with Cosette, a three-year-old girl, traveling with her mother Fantine, who is trying to find a job and a place to live. They have always been shunned away due to few employers hiring single mothers. When her mother is promised the prosperity of working in the big city, Cosette is separated from her in the hopes a caretaker named Thénardier will watch over her while her mother earns some money, but this was a trick and the caretaker is a corrupt man who makes Cosette his indentured servant, or more precisely his slave. Then, the kind mayor—formerly a convict named Jean Valjean—of the town that Cosette makes her new home in, sees how winds of change are so detrimental for children and families, and decides to do something about it, but forces Cosette to go on the run to escape his returning, difficult past.

== Characters and cast ==
Character(s)	Voice actor(s)
Cosette	Kaori Nazuka; Tamaki Matsumoto (3 years old)
Jean Valjean	Masashi Sugawara
Fantine	Emiko Hagiwara
Javert	Takashi Matsuyama
Gavroche	Yumiko Kobayashi
Thénardier	Masahito Yabe
Okami (Mme. Thénardier)	Mami Horikoshi
Éponine	Yūko Sasamoto; Yūki Ōtomo (4 years old)
Azelma	Kurumi Mamiya; Chihiro Yarita (2 years old)
Marius; Alain	Anri Katsu
Enjolras	Yūji Kishi
Combeferre	Wataru Hatano
Courfeyrac	Eiji Takemoto
Jean Prouvaire	Yoshinori Fujita
Grantaire	Norihisa Mori
Laigle	Ryō Naitō
Feuilly	Daisuke Matsubara
Bahorel	Takahiro Yoshimizu
Joly	Yūki Chiba
Montparnasse	Kōji Yusa
Claquesous	Junichi Endō
Babet	Akio Suyama
Gueulemer	Tetsu Inada
Zéphine	Atsuko Tanaka
Toron	Naomi Shindō
Mother Innocente	Sayuri Sadaoka
Béatrice	Miyuki Sawashiro
Charlotte	Nozomi Sasaki
Audrey	Haruka Tomatsu
Hugues (One of the Thénardiers' youngest sons)	Ai Tokunaga
Bressole (One of the Thénardiers' youngest sons)	Yūko Sanpei
Sister Simplice; Toussaint	Mika Kanai
Fauchelevent	Takkō Ishimori
Gillenormand	Tetsuo Komura
Marius' Aunt (Mademoiselle Gillenormand)	Miyuki Ono
Pontmercy	Akihiko Ishizumi
Mabeuf	Bin Shimada
Bishop Myriel	Chikao Ōtsuka
Champmathieu	Shinpachi Tsuji
Petit Gervais	Aiko Hibi
Bougon	Seiko Tamura
Chabouillet	Ryūji Mizuno
Hucheloup	Takuma Suzuki
Mylène	Miyuki Kawashō

== Episodes ==
1. Fantine and Cosette
2. Jean Valjean's Secret
3. A New Friend, Chou Chou
4. Mother's Letter
5. Javert's Suspicions
6. Cosette's Birthday
7. Lost Eponine
8. Mother's Skirt
9. Thenardier's Malice
10. Madeleine is Perplexed
11. Sister Simplice's Lie
12. Lonely Cosette
13. Jean Valjean and Cosette
14. Their Journey
15. Their Bond
16. The Gorbeau House in Paris
17. Javert Closes In
18. A Forgotten Reunion
19. Cosette is Taken
20. Monastic Life
21. Marius Pontmercy
22. Their Respective Journeys
23. Under The Parisian Sky
24. An Encounter in the Luxembourg Garden
25. Unreachable Feelings
26. Chance Encounters in Paris
27. The Girl Who Ran Away
28. The Found Letter
29. Thenardier's Trap
30. The Coin That Was Left Behind
31. The Quiet Rue Plumet
32. Traces of That Day
33. Giving Up On Reunion
34. Children In The Elephant
35. Patron Minette's Breakout
36. The Ailing of Paris
37. Marius's Miscalculation
38. Cosette and Eponine
39. June 5, 1832
40. The Night of the Revolution
41. Eponine's Love
42. A Letter from Marius
43. Gavroche's Wish
44. To the Light of the Future
45. The Sewers of Paris
46. Javert's Justice
47. The Bonds of the Hearts
48. Cosette and Marius
49. My Mother
50. The Eternal Ring
51. The Revealed Truth
52. Silver Silver Candlesticks

== Staff ==
- Original story: Les Misérables by Victor Hugo
- Producer: Kōichi Motohashi
- Planning: Kazuya Maeda (Fuji TV), Kōhei Sano, Kazuka Ishikawa
- Production manager: Ken'ichirō Hayafune
- Series composition: Tomoko Kanparu
- Character designs: Hajime Watanabe, Takahiro Yoshimatsu
- Chief animation director: Tadashi Shida
- Background artist: Kazue Itō
- Art director: Mitsuki Nakamura
- Color design: Tomoko Komatsubara
- Photography director: Seichi Morishita
- Sound director: Hiroyuki Hayase
- Music: Hayato Matsuo
- Music producers: Hitoshi Yoshimura (Index Music), Daisuke Honji (Index Music)
- Producers: Yukihiro Itō (Fuji TV), Kōji Yamamoto (Fuji TV), Michio Katō, Ken'ichi Satō
- Director: Hiroaki Sakurai
- Production: Fuji TV, Nippon Animation

== Theme songs ==
- Opening theme: Kaze no Mukō (風の向こう)

- Performance: Yuki Saitō (Index Music)

- Ending theme: Ma Maman (Watashi no Okā-san) (ma maman (私のお母さん))

- Performance: Yuki Saitō (Index Music)

== Reception ==
The anime was dubbed and broadcast in:

- Arab World by Venus Centre
- Italy under the title The Heart of Cosette
- Hong Kong
- Iran under the title The Poor: A girl named Cosette
- South Korea
- Philippines under the title Ang Pangarap ni Cosette ("The Dreams of Cosette"); discontinued due to Typhoon Ondoy

== See also ==
- Adaptations of Les Misérables
