= Les Misérables (1998 film) =

- Theatrical release poster
- Directed by: Bille August
- Screenplay by: Rafael Yglesias
- Based on: Les Misérables by Victor Hugo
- Produced by: James Gorman; Sarah Radclyffe
- Starring: Liam Neeson; Geoffrey Rush; Uma Thurman; Claire Danes; Hans Matheson; Reine Brynolfsson; Peter Vaughan
- Cinematography: Jörgen Persson
- Edited by: Janus Billeskov-Jansen
- Music by: Basil Poledouris
- Production companies: Columbia Pictures; Mandalay Entertainment
- Distributed by: Sony Pictures Releasing (United States); Entertainment Film Distributors (United Kingdom)
- Release dates: 1 May 1998 (United States); 20 November 1998 (United Kingdom); 24 December 1998 (Germany)
- Running time: 134 minutes
- Countries: United Kingdom; Germany; United States
- Language: English
- Box office: $14.1 million

Les Misérables is a 1998 film adaptation of Victor Hugo's 1862 novel of the same name, directed by Bille August. It stars Liam Neeson, Geoffrey Rush, Uma Thurman, and Claire Danes. As in the original novel, the storyline follows the adult life of Jean Valjean (Liam Neeson), an ex-convict (Note: (paroled following 19 years of hard labor for stealing bread)) pursued by police inspector Javert (Rush). It was filmed at Barrandov Studios in Prague, Czech Republic. The film was produced by Columbia Pictures and Mandalay Entertainment and distributed by Sony Pictures Releasing in the United States and by Entertainment Film Distributors in the United Kingdom.

== Plot ==
Jean Valjean, a man arrested for stealing food, is released after spending 19 years in a prison labour camp. When no one is willing to allow a convict to stay the night, Bishop Myriel kindly welcomes him into his home. Valjean explains to Myriel that sleeping in a real bed will make him a new man. In the night, Valjean, interrupted by Myriel while stealing his silverware, strikes him and flees. When the police arrest Valjean for stealing and drag him back to Myriel, Myriel tells them that the silverware was a gift and scolds Valjean for forgetting to take his candlesticks as well. Myriel then reminds Valjean that he is to become a new man.

Nine years later, Valjean is now a wealthy industrialist and a mayor. Fantine, a single mother working at one of Valjean's factories, is fired when her manager learns she has had a daughter out of wedlock. However, Valjean is preoccupied with the arrival of Inspector Javert, who previously served as a guard at the prison in which Valjean was held. Fantine, in desperate need of money to pay the extortionate demands of Mr. and Mrs. Thénardier for looking after her daughter Cosette, turns to prostitution. Javert starts to suspect that the Mayor and Valjean are the same person. Fantine is attacked by some customers and when she retaliates, Javert beats and arrests her, planning on sending her to prison. Citing his authority to do so as mayor, Valjean insists on her release and she is let go.

Valjean nurses Fantine back to health, and promises her that she will have her daughter back. However, the Thénardiers continue to extort more money from Valjean and Fantine on the pretence of Fantine's daughter being ill. Later, Valjean receives word that another man is mistaken as being him and is about to be arrested. Valjean arrives at court where the man is being tried and reveals his identity that he is the real Valjean. Valjean then returns home and finds Fantine at death's door. Before she dies, Valjean promises Fantine that he will raise her daughter as his own. Javert arrives at Valjean's home to arrest both him and Fantine, But Fantine dies when Javert tells her she will be sent to prison. Angry and grieving, Valjean fights Javert and knocks him out, then flees the town. Valjean eventually finds and rescues Cosette from the Thénardiers, the corrupt innkeepers who were supposed to care for her, but are actually forcing her to be their servant. They care little for the girl, seeing her merely as a way to bring in money (going so far as to offer up Cosette as a child prostitute to the as-yet unrevealed Valjean). Both Valjean and Cosette finally make it to Paris where they start a new life together as father and daughter, cloistered within a religious convent.

Ten years later, they leave the convent, and Cosette, now nineteen years old, falls deeply in love with a revolutionist, Marius. Meanwhile, Javert is now undercover as an insurrectionist, trying to undermine the organization to which Marius belongs. During an attempt to finally arrest Valjean, Javert is captured by Marius and is brought to the barricades as a prisoner to be executed. Valjean journeys to the barricades himself when he learns how much Cosette and Marius love each other, intending to persuade Marius to return to Cosette. When the soldiers shoot and kill Gavroche, a young boy allied with the revolutionists, Valjean uses his influence with Marius to have Javert turned over to him, so that he himself can execute him. Valjean takes Javert to a back alley, but instead of killing him, sets him free. Marius is shot and Valjean takes him down a sewer to bring him to safety. Javert intercepts them, but Valjean convinces him to spare Marius. Valjean takes Marius back to the convent, also saying goodbye to Cosette. When Valjean returns to Javert, Javert tells him that he is now unable to reconcile Valjean's criminal past with his current lawful existence and the great kindness, generosity, and goodness that Valjean has shown. Stating, "It's a pity the rules don't allow me to be merciful," Javert finally sets Valjean free, shackles himself, adding "I've tried to live my life without breaking a single rule," and throws himself into the Seine, thus taking his own life. Valjean walks down the empty street, finally a free man, with a smile on his face.

== Cast ==
- Liam Neeson as Jean Valjean
- Geoffrey Rush as Javert
- Uma Thurman as Fantine
- Claire Danes as Cosette
  - Mimi Newman as young Cosette
- Hans Matheson as Marius Pontmercy
- Jon Kenny and Gillian Hanna as the Thénardiers
- John McGlynn as Carnot
- Kelly Hunter as Mme Victurien
- Shane Hervey as Gavroche
- Lennie James as Enjolras
- Sylvie Koblizkova as Éponine
- Peter Vaughan as Bishop Myriel
- Julian Rhind-Tutt as Bamatabois
- David Birkin as Courfeyrac
- Ben Crompton as Grantaire
- Patsy Byrne as Toussaint
- Ralph Nossek as Valjean's secretary
- Frank O'Sullivan as Brevet
- Christopher Adamson as Bertin
- Tim Barlow as Lafitte
- Shannon McCormick as Redheaded Gendarme
- Reine Brynolfsson as Captain Beauvais
- Kathleen Byron as Mother Superior
- Toby Jones as Doorkeeper
- Edward Tudor Pole as Landlord
- Janet Henfrey as Madame Gilot

== Adaptation from the novel ==
The film changes the names of secondary characters and places to make them more readily understood by an English-speaking audience. Many details of the plot are faithfully reproduced, including the trial at Arras and the death of Gavroche, while entire segments of the plot are eliminated. As mayor, Valjean is aided by a junior police official more loyal to him than to Javert. The Thénardier family appears only when Valjean redeems Cosette. The Petit Gervais episode does not occur. Marius has no family background and leads the student revolt. Cosette is far more independent in the film, suggests leaving the cloister to experience the outside world, and challenges Valjean's control of her life. Valjean explains his past to her directly rather than through Marius. The film ends with Javert's suicide, eliminating the novel's extended denouement including the wedding and Valjean's death.

== Release ==
=== Critical reception ===
Les Misérables received generally positive reviews from critics. On review aggregator Rotten Tomatoes, the film holds an approval rating of 75% based on 44 reviews, with an average score of 6.9/10. The website's critical consensus reads, "This intelligent, handsomely crafted adaptation of Victor Hugo's classic novel condenses the story's developments without blunting its emotional impact." On Metacritic, the film received a score of 65 based on 24 reviews.

=== Box office ===
The film opened at number four in the US in its opening weekend with $5,011,840 behind He Got Game, City of Angels, and The Big Hit; the film grossed a US & Canadian total of $14,096,321.

== See also ==
- Adaptations of Les Misérables
