= Les Misérables =

1862 novel by Victor Hugo

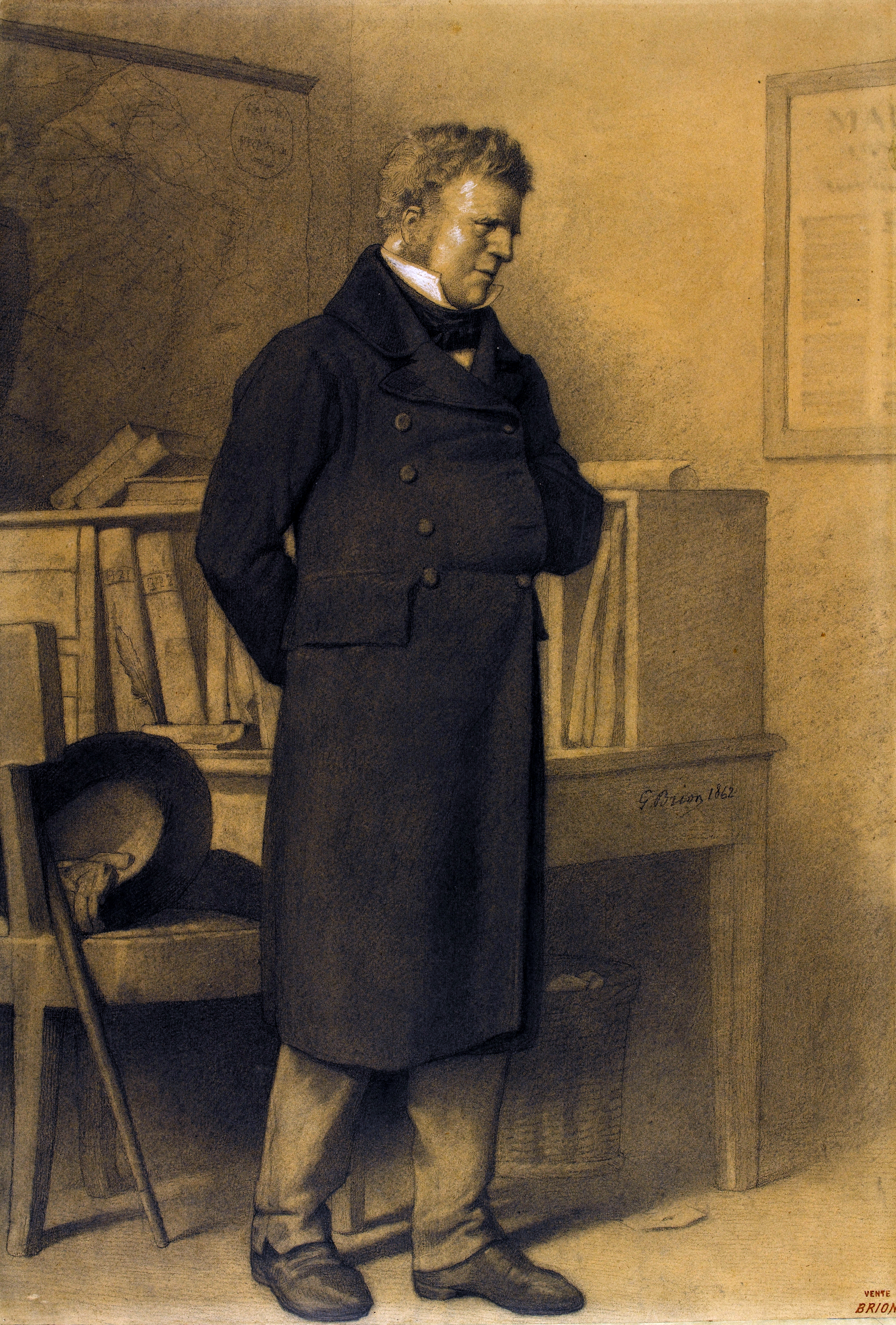
- Jean Valjean, under the alias Monsieur Madeleine, illustration by Gustave Brion
- Author: Victor Hugo
- Translator: Charles Wilbour
- Illustrator: Emile Bayard
- Language: French
- Genre: Epic novel, historical fiction, tragedy
- Publisher: A. Lacroix, Verboeckhoven & Cie.
- Publication date: 31 March 1862
- Publication place: First published in Belgium, when author was in self-imposed exile in Guernsey
- Pages: 1,462

Les Misérables (/leɪ ˌmɪzəˈrɑːb(əl), -blə/, French: [le mizeʁabl]) is a French epic historical novel by Victor Hugo, first published on 31 March 1862, that is considered one of the greatest novels of the 19th century. Les Misérables has been popularized through numerous adaptations for film, television, and the stage, including a musical.

In the English-speaking world, the novel is usually referred to by its original French title. However, several alternatives have been used, including The Miserables, The Wretched, The Miserable Ones, The Poor Ones, The Wretched Poor, The Victims, and The Dispossessed. Beginning in 1815 and culminating in the 1832 June Rebellion in Paris, the novel follows the lives and interactions of several characters, particularly the struggles of ex-convict Jean Valjean and his experience of redemption.

Examining the nature of law and grace, the novel elaborates upon the history of France, the architecture and urban design of Paris, politics, moral philosophy, antimonarchism, justice, religion, and the types and nature of romantic and familial love.

== Hugo's sources ==
An incident Hugo witnessed in 1829 involved three strangers and a police officer. One of the strangers was a man who had stolen a loaf of bread, similar to Jean Valjean, being taken to the coach by a police officer. Nearby, two onlookers, a mother and daughter, had stopped to watch the thief. They became the inspiration for Fantine and Cosette. Hugo imagined the life of the man in jail and the mother and daughter taken away from each other.

Valjean's character is loosely based on the life of the ex-convict Eugène François Vidocq. Vidocq became the head of an undercover police unit and later founded France's first private detective agency. He was also a businessman and was widely noted for his social engagement and philanthropy. Vidocq also inspired Hugo's "Claude Gueux" and Le Dernier jour d'un condamné (The Last Day of a Condemned Man).

In 1828, Vidocq, already pardoned, saved one of the workers in his paper factory by lifting a heavy cart on his shoulders as Valjean does. Hugo's description of Valjean rescuing a sailor on the Orion draws almost word for word on a Baron La Roncière's letter describing such an incident. Hugo used Bienvenu de Miollis (1753–1843), the Bishop of Digne during the time in which Valjean encounters Myriel, as the model for Myriel.

Hugo had used the departure of prisoners from the Bagne of Toulon in one of his early stories, Le Dernier Jour d'un Condamné. He went to Toulon to visit the Bagne in 1839 and took extensive notes, though he did not start writing the book until 1845. On one of the pages of his notes about the prison, he wrote in large block letters a possible name for his hero: "JEAN TRÉJEAN". When the book was finally written, Tréjean became Valjean.

In 1841, Hugo saved a prostitute from arrest for assault. He used a short part of his dialogue with the police when recounting Valjean's rescue of Fantine in the novel. On 22 February 1846, when he had begun work on the novel, Hugo witnessed the arrest of a bread thief while a duchess and her child watched the scene pitilessly from their coach. He spent several vacations in Montreuil-sur-Mer.

During the 1832 revolt, Hugo walked the streets of Paris, saw the barricades blocking his way at points, and had to take shelter from gunfire. He participated more directly in the 1848 Paris insurrection, helping to smash barricades and suppress both the popular revolt and its monarchist enemies.

Victor Hugo drew his inspiration from everything he heard and saw, writing it down in his diary. In December 1846, he witnessed an altercation between an old woman scavenging through rubbish and a street urchin who might have been Gavroche. He also informed himself by personal inspection of the Paris Conciergerie in 1846 and Waterloo in 1861, by gathering information on some industries, and on working-class people's wages and living standards. He asked his mistresses, Léonie d'Aunet and Juliette Drouet, to tell him about life in convents. He also slipped personal anecdotes into the plot. For instance, Marius and Cosette's wedding night (Part V, Book 6, Chapter 1) takes place on 16 February 1833, which is also the date when Hugo and his lifelong mistress Juliette Drouet had sex for the first time.

Hugo also took inspiration from Eugène Sue's Les Mystères de Paris (The Mysteries of Paris), a serialized novel that enjoyed great success when it was published during 1842 and 1843. Both novels view contemporary Paris from the perspective of the most-downtrodden members of society, and Les Misérables even borrows some plot elements from Les Mystères de Paris.

== Novel form ==
Upton Sinclair described the novel as "one of the half-dozen greatest novels of the world" and remarked that Hugo set forth the purpose of Les Misérables in the preface:

So long as there shall exist, by reason of law and custom, a social condemnation, which, in the face of civilization, artificially creates hells on earth, and complicates a destiny that is divine with human fatality; so long as the three problems of the age—the degradation of man by poverty, the ruin of women by starvation, and the dwarfing of childhood by physical and spiritual night—are not solved; so long as, in certain regions, social asphyxia shall be possible; in other words, and from a yet more extended point of view, so long as ignorance and misery remain on earth, books like this cannot be useless.

Towards the end of the novel, Hugo explains the work's overarching structure:

The book which the reader has before him at this moment is, from one end to the other, in its entirety and details ... a progress from evil to good, from injustice to justice, from falsehood to truth, from night to day, from appetite to conscience, from corruption to life; from bestiality to duty, from hell to heaven, from nothingness to God. The starting point: matter, destination: the soul. The hydra at the beginning, the angel at the end.

The novel contains various subplots, but the main thread is the story of ex-convict Jean Valjean, who becomes a force for good in the world but cannot escape his criminal past. The novel is divided into 5 volumes, each divided into several books and subdivided into chapters, for a total of 48 books and 365 chapters. Each chapter is relatively short, commonly no longer than a few pages.

The novel as a whole is one of the longest ever written, with 655,478 words in the original French. Hugo explained his ambitions for the novel to his Italian publisher:

I don't know whether it will be read by everyone, but it is meant for everyone. It addresses England as well as Spain, Italy as well as France, Germany as well as Ireland, the republics that harbour slaves as well as empires that have serfs. Social problems go beyond frontiers. Humankind's wounds, those huge sores that litter the world, do not stop at the blue and red lines drawn on maps. Wherever men go in ignorance or despair, wherever women sell themselves for bread, wherever children lack a book to learn from or a warm hearth, Les Misérables knocks at the door and says: "open up, I am here for you".

=== Digressions ===
More than a quarter of the novel—by one count 955 of 2,783 pages—is devoted to essays that argue a moral point or display Hugo's encyclopedic knowledge but do not advance the plot, nor even a subplot, a method Hugo used in such other works as The Hunchback of Notre-Dame and Toilers of the Sea. One biographer noted, "The digressions of genius are easily pardoned". The topics Hugo addresses include cloistered religious orders, the construction of the Paris sewers, argot, and the street urchins of Paris. The one about convents he titles "Parenthesis" to alert the reader to its irrelevance to the storyline.

Hugo devotes another 19 chapters (Volume II, Book I) to an account—and meditation on the place in history—of the Battle of Waterloo, the battlefield of which Hugo visited in 1861 and where he finished writing the novel. It opens volume II with such a change of subject as to seem the beginning of an entirely different work. The fact that this "digression" occupies such a large part of the text demands that it be read in the context of the "overarching structure" discussed above. Hugo draws his own personal conclusions, taking Waterloo to be a pivot point in history but definitely not a victory for the forces of reaction.

Waterloo, by cutting short the demolition of European thrones by the sword, had no other effect than to cause the revolutionary work to be continued in another direction. The slashers have finished; it was the turn of the thinkers. The century that Waterloo was intended to arrest has pursued its march. That sinister victory was vanquished by liberty.

One critic has called this "the spiritual gateway" to the novel, as its chance encounter of Thénardier and Colonel Pontmercy foreshadows so many of the novel's encounters "blending chance and necessity", a "confrontation of heroism and villainy".

Even when not turning to other subjects outside his narrative, Hugo sometimes interrupts the straightforward recitation of events, his voice and control of the storyline unconstrained by time and sequence. The novel opens with a statement about the bishop of Digne in 1815 and immediately shifts: "Although these details in no way essentially concern that which we have to tell..." Only after 14 chapters does Hugo pick up the opening thread again, "In the early days of the month of October 1815...", to introduce Jean Valjean.

== Characters ==
=== Major ===
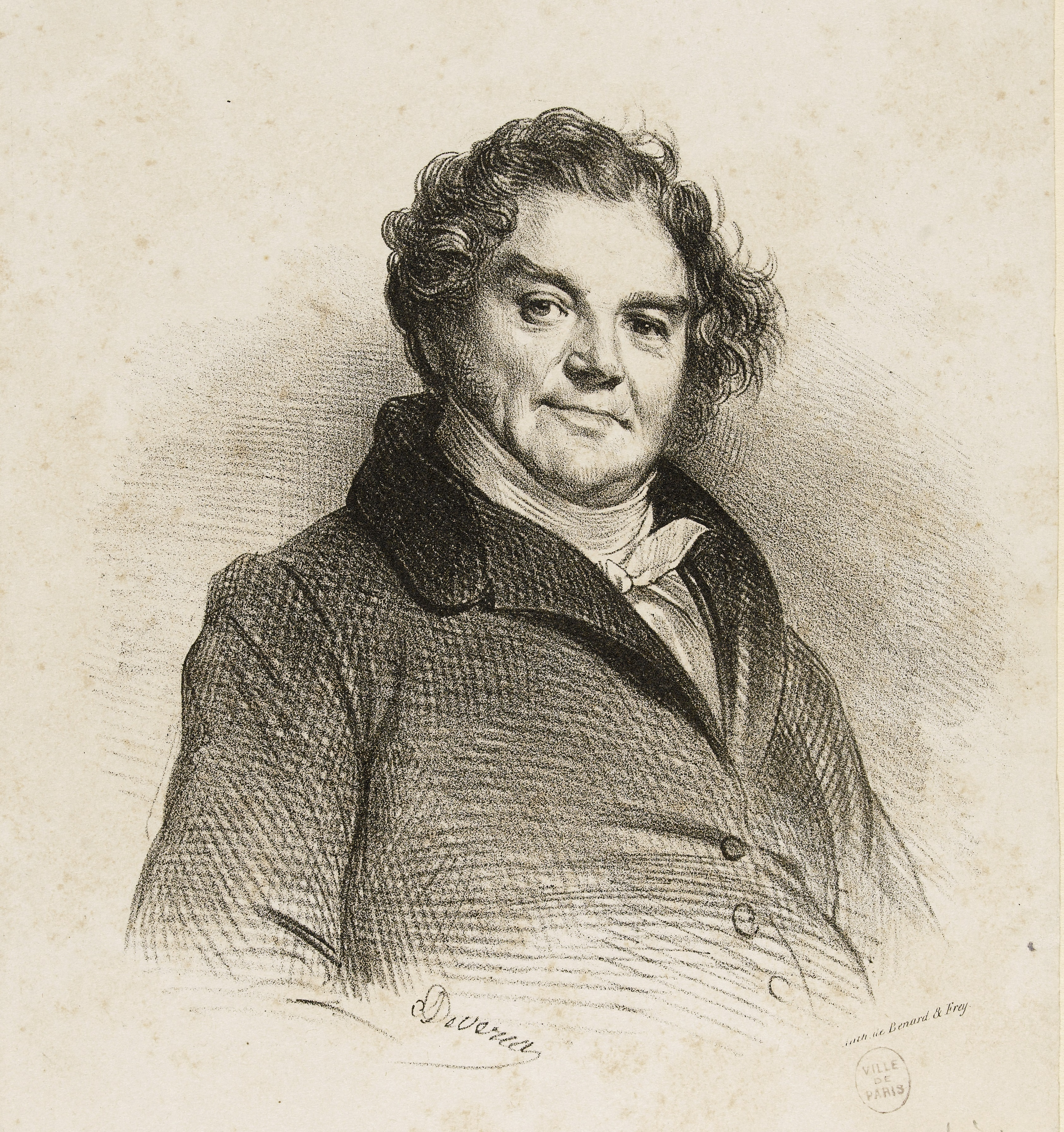
Eugène Vidocq, whose career provided a model for the character of Jean Valjean

- Jean Valjean (also known as Monsieur Madeleine, Ultime Fauchelevent, Monsieur Leblanc, and Urbain Fabre) – The protagonist of the novel. He was born in Faverolles, Aisne. Convicted for stealing a loaf of bread to feed his sister's seven starving children and sent to prison for five years, he is paroled from prison nineteen years later (after four unsuccessful escape attempts added twelve years and fighting back during the second escape attempt added two extra years). Rejected by society for being a former convict, he encounters Bishop Myriel, who turns his life around by showing him mercy and encouraging him to become a new man. While sitting and pondering what Bishop Myriel had said, he puts his shoe on a forty-sou piece dropped by a young wanderer. Valjean threatens the boy with his stick when the boy attempts to rouse him from his reverie and recover his money. He tells a passing priest his name and the name of the boy, which allows the police to charge him with armed robbery – a sentence that, if he were caught again, would return him to prison for life. He assumes a new identity (Monsieur Madeleine) in order to pursue an honest life. He introduces new manufacturing techniques and eventually builds two factories, becoming one of the richest men in the area. By popular acclaim, he is made mayor of Montreuil-sur-Mer. He confronts Javert over Fantine's punishment, turns himself in to the police to save another man from prison for life, and rescues Cosette from the Thénardiers. Discovered by Javert in Paris because of his generosity to the poor, he evades capture for the next several years in a convent. He saves Marius from imprisonment and probable death at the barricade, reveals his true identity to Marius and Cosette after their wedding, and is reunited with them just before his death, having kept his promise to the bishop and to Fantine, the image of whom is the last thing he sees before dying.
- Javert – A fanatic police inspector in pursuit to recapture Valjean. Born in the prisons to a convict father and a fortune teller mother, he renounces both of them and starts working as a guard in the prison, including one stint as the overseer for the chain gang of which Valjean is part (and here witnesses firsthand Valjean's enormous strength and just what he looks like). Eventually, he joins the police force in Montreuil-sur-Mer. He arrests Fantine and comes into conflict with Valjean/Madeleine, who orders him to release Fantine. Valjean dismisses Javert in front of his squad, and Javert, seeking revenge, reports to the police inspector that he has discovered Jean Valjean. He is told that he must be incorrect, as a man mistakenly believed to be Jean Valjean was just arrested. He requests M. Madeleine to dismiss him in disgrace, for he cannot be less harsh on himself than on others. When the real Jean Valjean turns himself in, Javert is promoted to the Paris police force, where he arrests Valjean and sends him back to prison. After Valjean escapes again, Javert attempts one more arrest in vain. He almost recaptures Valjean at the Gorbeau House when he arrests the Thénardiers and Patron-Minette. Later, while working undercover behind the barricade, his identity is discovered. Valjean pretends to execute Javert but releases him. When Javert next encounters Valjean emerging from the sewers, he allows him a brief visit home and then walks off instead of arresting him. Javert cannot reconcile his devotion to the law with his recognition that the lawful course is immoral. After composing a letter to the prefect of police outlining the squalid conditions that occur in prisons and the abuses that prisoners are subjected to, he takes his own life by jumping into the Seine.
- Fantine – She was born in Montreuil-sur-Mer but moved to Paris as a teenager. This grisette was abandoned with a small child by her lover, Félix Tholomyès. Fantine leaves her daughter, Cosette, in the care of the Thénardiers, innkeepers in the village of Montfermeil. Mme. Thénardier spoils her own daughters and abuses Cosette. Fantine finds work at Monsieur Madeleine's factory. Illiterate, she has others write letters to the Thénardiers on her behalf. A female supervisor discovers that she is an unwed mother and dismisses her. To meet the Thénardiers' repeated demands for money, she sells her hair and two front teeth and turns to prostitution. She becomes ill. Valjean learns of her plight when Javert arrests her for attacking a man who called her insulting names and threw snow down her back. He sends her to a hospital. Because her illness has made her so weak, she dies of shock when Javert, confronting Valjean in her hospital room, reveals that Valjean is a convict and has not brought Cosette to her (after the doctor encouraged the incorrect belief that Jean Valjean's recent absence was because he was bringing her daughter to her).
- Cosette (formally Euphrasie, also known as "the Lark", Mademoiselle Lanoire, Ursula) – The illegitimate daughter of Fantine and Tholomyès. From approximately the age of three to the age of eight, she is beaten and forced to work as a drudge for the Thénardiers. After her mother dies, Valjean ransoms her from the Thénardiers and cares for her as if she were his daughter. Nuns in a Paris convent educate her. She grows up to become very beautiful. She falls in love with Marius Pontmercy and marries him near the novel's conclusion.
- Marius Pontmercy – A young law student loosely associated with the Friends of the ABC. He shares the political principles of his father and has a tempestuous relationship with his royalist grandfather, Monsieur Gillenormand. He falls in love with Cosette and fights on the barricades when he believes Valjean has taken her to London. After he and Cosette marry, he recognizes Thénardier as a swindler and pays him to leave France.
- Éponine (the Jondrette girl) – The Thénardiers' elder daughter. As a child, she is pampered and spoiled by her parents but ends up a street urchin when she reaches adolescence. She participates in her father's crimes and begging schemes to obtain money. She is blindly in love with Marius. At Marius's request, she finds Valjean and Cosette's house for him and sadly leads him there. She also prevents her father, Patron-Minette, and Brujon from robbing the house during one of Marius's visits there to see Cosette. After disguising herself as a boy, she manipulates Marius into going to the barricades, hoping she and Marius will die there together. Wanting to die before him, however, she reaches out her hand to stop a soldier from shooting at him; she is mortally wounded as the bullet goes through her hand and her back. As she is dying, she confesses all this to Marius and gives him a letter from Cosette. Her final request to Marius is that once she has passed, he will kiss her on the forehead. He fulfills her request not because of romantic feelings on his part, but out of pity for her hard life.
- Monsieur Thénardier and Madame Thénardier (also known as the Jondrettes, M. Fabantou, M. Thénard. Some translations identify her as the Thenardiess) – Husband and wife, parents of five children: two daughters, Éponine and Azelma, and three sons, Gavroche and two unnamed younger sons. As innkeepers, they abuse Cosette as a child and extort payment from Fantine for her support, until Valjean takes Cosette away. They become bankrupt and relocate under the name Jondrette to a house in Paris called the Gorbeau House, living in the room next to Marius. The husband associates with a criminal group called Patron-Minette and conspires to rob Valjean until he is thwarted by Marius. Javert arrests the couple. The wife dies in prison. Her husband attempts to blackmail Marius with his knowledge of Valjean's past, but Marius pays him to leave the country and he becomes a slave trader in the United States.
- Gavroche – The unloved middle child and eldest son of the Thénardiers. He lives on his own as a street urchin and sleeps inside an elephant statue outside the Bastille. He briefly takes care of his two younger brothers, unaware they are related to him. He takes part in the barricades and is killed while collecting bullets from dead National Guardsmen.
- Bishop Myriel – The Bishop of Digne (full name Charles-François-Bienvenu Myriel, also called Monseigneur Bienvenu) – A kindly old priest promoted to bishop after a chance encounter with Napoleon. After Valjean steals some silver from him, he saves him from being arrested and inspires him to change his ways.

=== Friends of the ABC ===
A revolutionary student club. In French, the letters "ABC" are pronounced identically to the French word abaissés, "the abased".

- Bahorel – A dandy and an idler from a peasant background who is well known around the student cafés of Paris.
- Combeferre – A medical student described as representing the philosophy of the revolution.
- Courfeyrac – A law student described as the centre of the group of Friends. He is honorable, warm, and Marius's closest companion.
- Enjolras – The leader of the Friends in the Paris uprising. A resolute and charismatic youth, he is passionately committed to republican principles and the idea of progress. He and Grantaire are executed by the National Guards after the barricade falls.
- Feuilly – An orphaned fan maker and passionate Polonophile who taught himself to read and write. He is the only member of the Friends who is not a student.
- Grantaire (also "R") – A drunk with little interest in revolution. Despite his pessimism, he eventually declares himself a believer in the Republic and dies alongside Enjolras, whom he reveres.
- Jean Prouvaire (also Jehan) – A Romantic with knowledge of Italian, Latin, Greek, and Hebrew and an interest in the Middle Ages
- Joly – A medical student who has unusual theories about health. He is a hypochondriac and is described as the happiest of the Friends.
- Lesgle (also Lègle, Laigle, L'Aigle [The Eagle], or Bossuet) – The oldest member of the group. Considered notoriously unlucky, Lesgle begins balding at the age of twenty-five. It is Lesgle who introduces Marius to the Friends.

=== Minor ===
- Azelma – The younger daughter of the Thénardiers. Like her sister, Éponine, she is spoiled as a child and impoverished when older. She abets her father's failed robbery of Valjean. On Marius and Cosette's wedding day, she tails Valjean on her father's orders. She travels to America with her father at the end of the novel.
- Bamatabois – An idler who harasses Fantine and later a juror at Champmathieu's trial
- (Mlle) Baptistine Myriel – Bishop Myriel's sister. She loves and venerates her brother.
- Blachevelle – A wealthy student in Paris originally from Montauban. He is a friend of Félix Tholomyès and becomes romantically involved with Fantine's friend Favourite.
- Bougon, Madame (called Ma'am Burgon) – Housekeeper of the Gorbeau House
- Brevet – An ex-convict from Toulon who knew Valjean there; released one year after Valjean. In 1823, he is serving time in the prison in Arras for an unknown crime. He is the first to claim that Champmathieu is really Valjean. He used to wear knitted, checkered suspenders.
- Brujon – A robber and criminal. He participates in crimes with M. Thénardier and the Patron-Minette gang (such as the Gorbeau robbery and the attempted robbery at the Rue Plumet). The author describes Brujon as being "a sprightly young fellow, very cunning and very adroit, with a flurried and plaintive appearance".
- Champmathieu – A vagabond who is misidentified as Valjean after being caught stealing apples
- Chenildieu – A lifer from Toulon. He and Valjean were chain mates for five years. He once tried to unsuccessfully remove his lifer's brand TFP (travaux forcés à perpetuité, "forced labour for life") by putting his shoulder on a chafing dish full of embers. He is described as a small, wiry but energetic man.
- Cochepaille – Another lifer from Toulon. He used to be a shepherd from the Pyrenees who became a smuggler. He is described as stupid and has a tattoo on his arm, 1 Mars 1815.
- Colonel Georges Pontmercy – Marius's father and an officer in Napoleon's army. Wounded at Waterloo, Pontmercy erroneously believes M. Thénardier saved his life. He tells Marius of this great debt. He loves Marius, and although M. Gillenormand does not allow him to visit, he continually hides behind a pillar in the church on Sunday so that he can at least look at Marius from a distance. Napoleon made him a baron, but the next regime refuses to recognize his barony or his status as a colonel, instead referring to him only as a commandant. The book usually calls him "the colonel".
- Dahlia – A young grisette in Paris and member of Fantine's group of seamstress friends along with Favourite and Zéphine. She becomes romantically involved with Félix Tholomyès's friend Listolier.
- Fameuil – A wealthy student in Paris originally from Limoges. He is a friend of Félix Tholomyès and becomes romantically involved with Fantine's friend Zéphine.
- Fauchelevent – A failed businessman whom Valjean (as M. Madeleine) saves from being crushed under a carriage. Valjean gets him a position as gardener at a Paris convent, where Fauchelevent later provides sanctuary for Valjean and Cosette and allows Valjean to pose as his brother.
- Favourite – A young grisette in Paris and leader of Fantine's group of seamstress friends (including Zéphine and Dahlia). She is independent and well versed in the ways of the world and had previously been in England. Although she cannot stand Félix Tholomyès's friend Blachevelle and is in love with someone else, she endures a relationship with him so she can enjoy the perks of courting a wealthy man.
- Gillenormand, Mademoiselle – Daughter of M. Gillenormand, with whom she lives. Her late half sister (M. Gillenormand's daughter from another marriage), was Marius's mother.
- Gillenormand, Monsieur – Marius's grandfather. A monarchist, he disagrees sharply with Marius on political issues, and they have several arguments. He attempts to keep Marius from being influenced by his father, Colonel Georges Pontmercy. While in perpetual conflict with him over ideas, he holds his grandson in affection.
- Théodule Gillenormand – Army officer and Marius's cousin. He makes a half-hearted and unsuccessful attempt at supplanting Marius in the affections of their grandfather.
- Listolier – A wealthy student in Paris originally from Cahors. He is a friend of Félix Tholomyès and becomes romantically involved with Fantine's friend Dahlia.
- Mabeuf – An elderly churchwarden and friend of Colonel Pontmercy, who after the Colonel's death befriends his son, Marius, and helps him realize his father loved him. Mabeuf loves plants and books but sells his books and prints in order to pay for a friend's medical care. When Mabeuf finds a purse in his yard, he takes it to the police. After selling his last book, he joins the students in the insurrection. He is shot dead raising the flag atop the barricade.
- Magloire, Madame – Domestic servant to Bishop Myriel and his sister
- Magnon – Former servant of M. Gillenormand and friend of the Thénardiers. She had been receiving child support payments from M. Gillenormand for her two illegitimate sons, who she claims were fathered by him. When her sons die in an epidemic, she has them replaced with the Thénardiers' two youngest sons so that she can protect her income. The Thénardiers get a portion of the payments. She is incorrectly arrested for involvement in the Gorbeau robbery.
- Mother Innocente (aka Marguerite de Blemeur) – The prioress of the Petit-Picpus convent
- Patron-Minette – A quartet of bandits who assist in the Thénardiers' ambush of Valjean at the Gorbeau House and the attempted robbery at the Rue Plumet. The gang consists of Montparnasse, Claquesous, Babet, and Gueulemer. Claquesous, who escapes from the carriage transporting him to prison after the Gorbeau robbery, joins the revolution under the guise of "Le Cabuc" and is executed by Enjolras for firing on civilians.
- Petit Gervais – A travelling Savoyard boy who drops a coin. Valjean, still a man of criminal mind, places his foot on the coin and refuses to return it.
- Sister Simplice – A famously truthful nun who cares for Fantine on her sickbed and lies to Javert to protect Valjean.
- Félix Tholomyès – Fantine's lover and Cosette's biological father. A wealthy, self-centered student in Paris originally from Toulouse, he eventually abandons Fantine when their daughter is two years old.
- Toussaint – Valjean and Cosette's servant in Paris. She has a slight stutter.
- Two little boys – The two unnamed youngest sons of the Thénardiers, whom they send to Magnon to replace her two dead sons. Living on the streets, they encounter Gavroche, who is unaware they are his siblings but treats them like they are his brothers. After Gavroche's death, they retrieve bread tossed by a bourgeois man to geese in a fountain at the Luxembourg Garden.
- Zéphine – A young grisette in Paris and member of Fantine's group of seamstress friends along with Favourite and Dahlia. She becomes romantically involved with Félix Tholomyès's friend Fameuil.

=== The narrator ===
Hugo does not give the narrator a name and allows the reader to identify the narrator with the novel's author. The narrator occasionally injects himself into the narrative or reports facts outside the time of the narrative to emphasize that he is recounting historical events, not entirely fiction. He introduces his recounting of Waterloo with several paragraphs describing the narrator's recent approach to the battlefield: "Last year (1861), on a beautiful May morning, a traveller, the person who is telling this story, was coming from Nivelles ..." The narrator describes how "[a]n observer, a dreamer, the author of this book" during the 1832 street fighting was caught in the crossfire: "All that he had to protect him from the bullets was the swell of the two half columns which separate the shops; he remained in this delicate situation for nearly half an hour." At one point, he apologizes for intruding—"The author of this book, who regrets the necessity of mentioning himself"—to ask the reader's understanding when he describes "the Paris of his youth ... as though it still existed". This introduces a meditation on memories of past places that his contemporary readers would recognize as a self-portrait written from exile: "You have left a part of your heart, of your blood, of your soul, in those pavements." He describes another occasion when a bullet shot "pierced a brass shaving-dish suspended ... over a hairdresser's shop. This pierced shaving-dish was still to be seen in 1848, in the Rue du Contrat-Social, at the corner of the pillars of the market." As evidence of police double agents at the barricades, he writes, "The author of this book had in his hands, in 1848, the special report on this subject made to the Prefect of Police in 1832."

== Plot ==
=== Volume I: Fantine ===
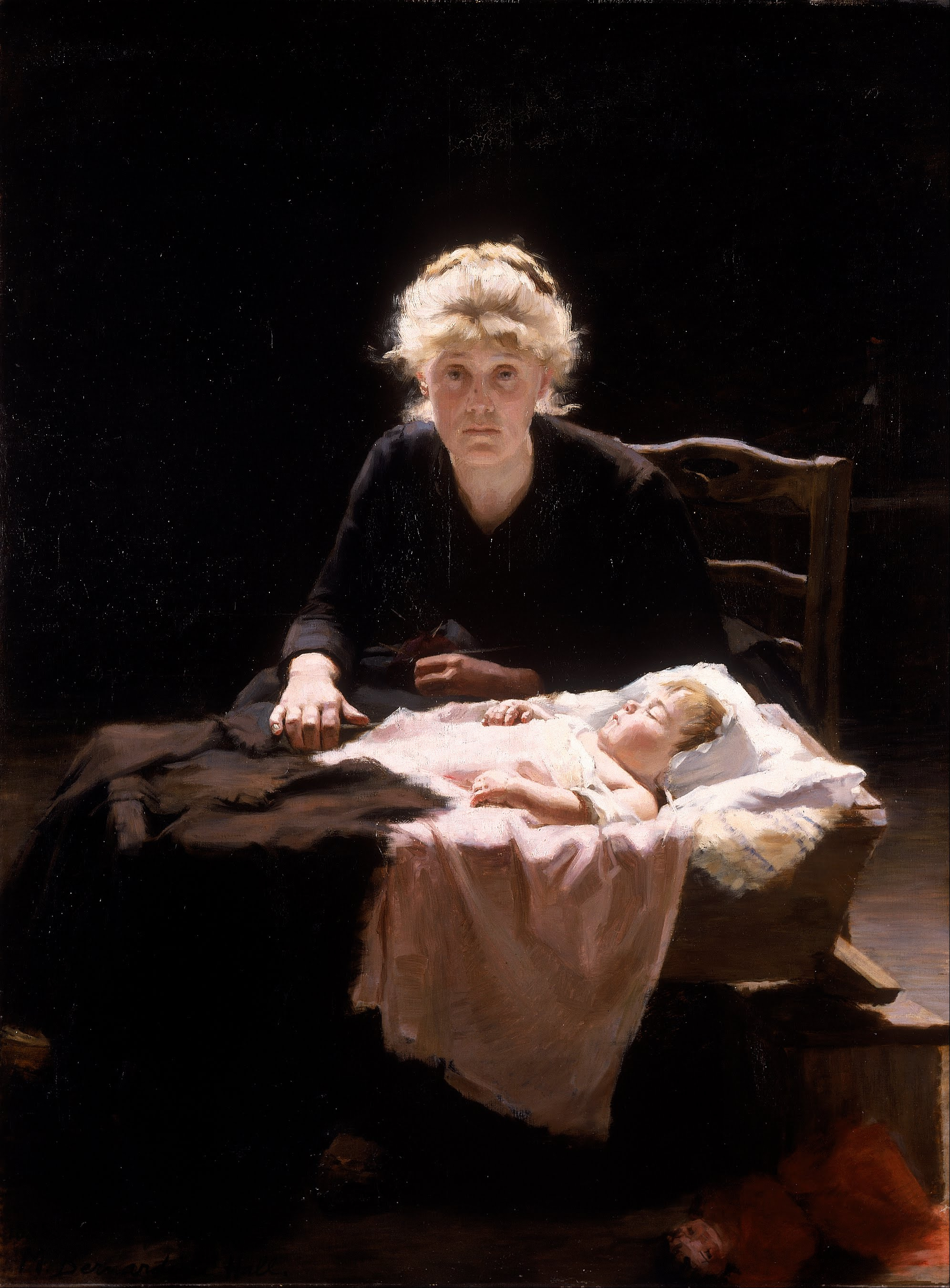
Fantine by Margaret Hall

In 1815 Digne, the peasant Jean Valjean, just released from 19 years' imprisonment in the Bagne of Toulon—five for stealing bread for his starving sister and her family and fourteen more for numerous escape attempts—is turned away by multiple innkeepers because his yellow passport marks him as a former convict. He sleeps on the street, angry and bitter.

Digne's benevolent Bishop Myriel gives him shelter. At night, Valjean runs off with Myriel's silverware. When the police capture Valjean, Myriel pretends that he has given the silverware to Valjean and presses him to take two silver candlesticks as well, as if he had forgotten to take them. The police accept his explanation and leave. Myriel tells Valjean that his soul has been purchased for God and that he should use money from the silver candlesticks to make an honest man of himself.

Valjean broods over Myriel's words. When opportunity presents itself, purely out of habit, he steals a 40-sou coin from 12-year-old Petit Gervais and chases the boy away. He quickly repents and panics, searching the city for Gervais. At the same time, his theft is reported to the authorities. Valjean hides as they search for him because if he is apprehended, he will be returned to the galleys for life as a repeat offender.

Six years pass, and Valjean, using the alias Monsieur Madeleine, has become a wealthy factory owner and is appointed mayor of Montreuil-sur-Mer. Walking down the street, he sees a man named Fauchelevent pinned under the wheels of a cart. When no one volunteers to lift the cart, even for pay, he decides to rescue Fauchelevent himself. He crawls underneath the cart, manages to lift it, and frees him. The town's police inspector, Inspector Javert, who was an adjutant guard at the Bagne of Toulon during Valjean's incarceration, becomes suspicious of the mayor after witnessing this remarkable feat of strength. He has known only one other man, a convict named Jean Valjean, who could accomplish it.

Years earlier in Paris, a grisette named Fantine was very much in love with Félix Tholomyès. His friends, Listolier, Fameuil, and Blachevelle, were also paired with Fantine's friends Dahlia, Zéphine, and Favourite. The men abandon the women, treating their relationships as youthful amusements. Fantine must draw on her own resources to care for her and Tholomyès's daughter, Cosette. When Fantine arrives at Montfermeil, she leaves Cosette in the care of the Thénardiers, a corrupt innkeeper and his selfish, cruel wife.

Fantine is unaware that they are abusing her daughter and using her as forced labor for their inn and continues to try to meet their growing, extortionate, and fictitious demands. She is later fired from her job at Jean Valjean's factory because of the discovery of her daughter, who was born out of wedlock. Meanwhile, the Thénardiers' monetary demands continue to grow. In desperation, Fantine sells her hair and two front teeth and resorts to prostitution to pay the Thénardiers. Fantine is slowly dying from an unspecified disease.

A dandy named Bamatabois harasses Fantine in the street, and she reacts by striking him. Javert arrests Fantine. She begs to be released so that she can provide for her daughter, but Javert sentences her to six months in prison. Valjean (Mayor Madeleine) intervenes and orders Javert to release her. Javert resists, but Valjean prevails. Valjean, feeling responsible because his factory turned her away, promises Fantine that he will bring Cosette to her. He takes her to a hospital.

Javert comes to see Valjean again. Javert admits that after being forced to free Fantine, he reported him as Valjean to the French authorities. He tells Valjean he realizes he was wrong because the authorities have identified someone else as the real Jean Valjean, have him in custody, and plan to try him the next day. Valjean is torn but decides to reveal himself to save the innocent man, whose real name is Champmathieu. He travels to attend the trial and there reveals his true identity. Valjean returns to Montreuil to see Fantine, followed by Javert, who confronts him in her hospital room.

After Javert grabs Valjean, Valjean asks for three days to bring Cosette to Fantine, but Javert refuses. Fantine discovers that Cosette is not at the hospital and fretfully asks where she is. Javert orders her to be quiet and then reveals to her Valjean's real identity. Weakened by the severity of her illness, she falls back in shock and dies. Valjean goes to Fantine, speaks to her in an inaudible whisper, kisses her hand, and then leaves with Javert. Later, Fantine's body is unceremoniously thrown into a public grave.

=== Volume II: Cosette ===
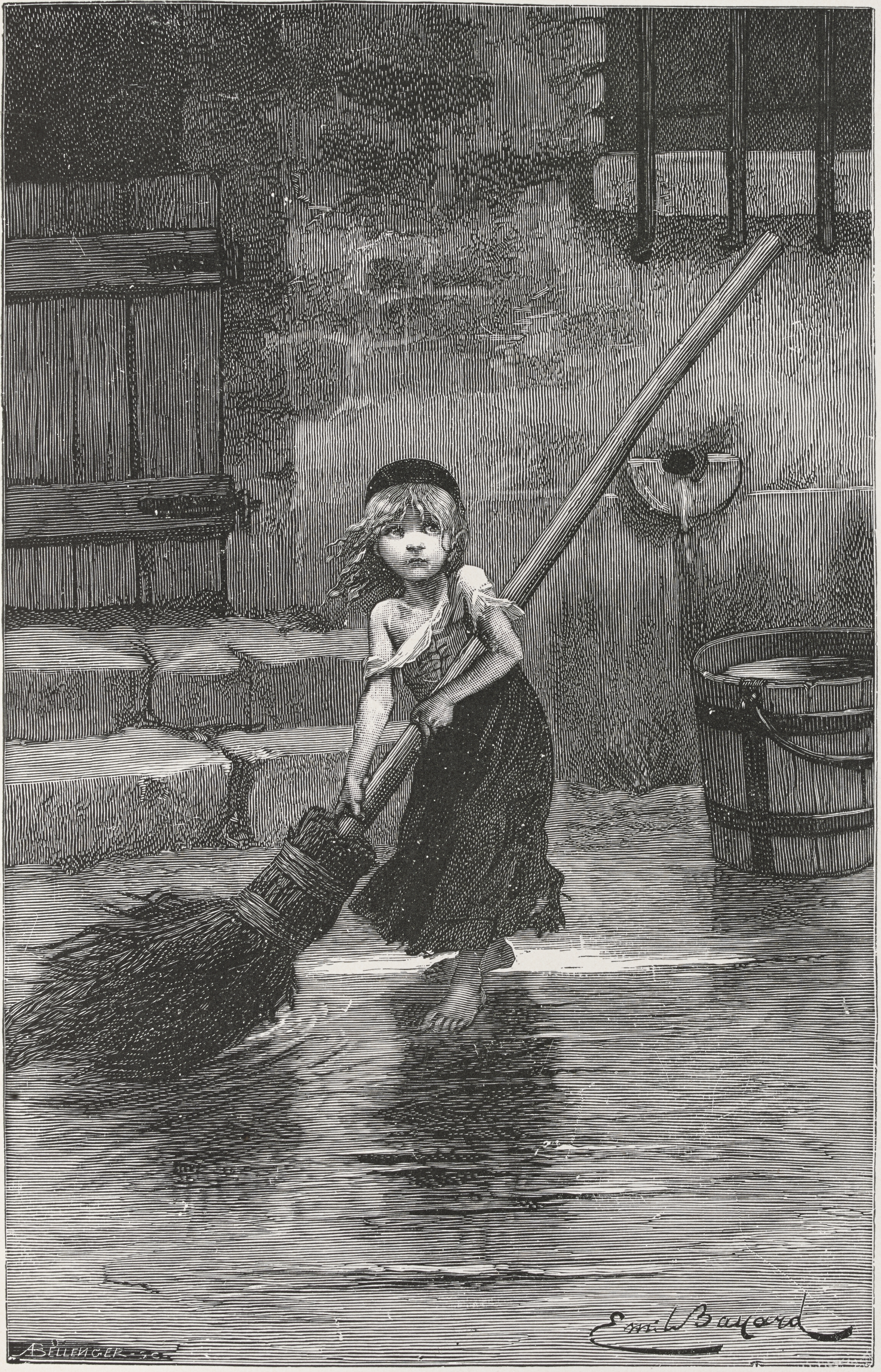
Cosette by Emile Bayard, from the original edition of Les Misérables (1862)

Valjean escapes, is recaptured, and is sentenced to death. The king commutes his sentence to penal servitude for life. While imprisoned in the Bagne of Toulon, Valjean, at great personal risk, rescues a sailor caught in the ship's rigging. Spectators call for his release. Valjean fakes his death by allowing himself to fall into the ocean. Authorities report him dead and his body lost.

Valjean arrives at Montfermeil on Christmas Eve. He finds Cosette fetching water in the woods alone and walks with her to the inn. He orders a meal and observes how the Thénardiers abuse her while pampering their own daughters, Éponine and Azelma, who mistreat Cosette for playing with their doll. Valjean leaves and returns to give Cosette a present of an expensive new doll, which, after some hesitation, she happily accepts. Éponine and Azelma are envious. Madame Thénardier is furious with Valjean, while her husband makes light of Valjean's behavior, caring only that he pays for his food and lodging.

The next morning, Valjean informs the Thénardiers that he wants to take Cosette with him. Madame Thénardier immediately accepts while Thénardier pretends to love Cosette and be concerned for her welfare, reluctant to give her up. Valjean pays the Thénardiers 1,500 francs, and he and Cosette leave the inn. Thénardier, hoping to swindle more out of Valjean, runs after them, holding the 1,500 francs, and tells Valjean he wants Cosette back. He informs Valjean that he cannot release Cosette without a note from the child's mother. Valjean hands Thénardier Fantine's letter authorizing the bearer to take Cosette. Thénardier then demands that Valjean pay a thousand crowns, but Valjean and Cosette leave. Thénardier regrets that he did not bring his gun and turns back towards home.

Valjean and Cosette flee to Paris. Valjean rents new lodgings at the Gorbeau House, where he and Cosette live happily. However, Javert discovers Valjean's lodgings there a few months later. Valjean takes Cosette, and they try to escape from Javert. They soon find shelter in the Petit-Picpus convent with the help of Fauchelevent, the man Valjean once rescued from being crushed under a cart and who has become the convent's gardener. Valjean also becomes a gardener, and Cosette becomes a student at the convent school.

=== Volume III: Marius ===
Eight years later, the Friends of the ABC, led by Enjolras, are preparing an act of anti-Orléanist civil unrest (i.e., the Paris uprising on 5–6 June 1832, a setting quite different than the 1789 French Revolution—which is an important plot point on which viewers of the musical have often been mistaken and confused) following the death of Lamarque, a popular general known for his sympathy towards the working class. Lamarque was a victim of a major cholera epidemic that had ravaged the city, particularly its poor neighborhoods, arousing suspicion that the government had been poisoning wells. The Friends of the ABC are joined by the poor of the Cour des miracles, including the Thénardiers' eldest son, Gavroche, who is a street urchin.

One of the students, Marius Pontmercy, has become alienated from his family (especially his royalist grandfather, M. Gillenormand) because of his Bonapartist views. After the death of his father, Colonel Georges Pontmercy, Marius discovers a note from him instructing his son to provide help to a sergeant named Thénardier who saved his life at Waterloo—in reality, Thénardier was looting corpses and only saved Pontmercy's life by accident; he had called himself a sergeant under Napoleon to avoid exposing himself as a robber.

At the Luxembourg Garden, Marius falls in love with the now grown and beautiful Cosette. The Thénardiers have also moved to Paris and now live in poverty after losing their inn. They live under the surname Jondrette at the Gorbeau House (coincidentally, the same building Valjean and Cosette briefly lived in after leaving the Thénardiers' inn). Marius lives there as well, next door to the Thénardiers.

Éponine, now ragged and emaciated, visits Marius at his apartment to beg for money. To impress him, she tries to prove her literacy by reading aloud from a book and by writing "The Cops Are Here" on a sheet of paper. Marius pities her and gives her some money. After Éponine leaves, Marius observes the "Jondrettes" in their apartment through a crack in the wall. Éponine comes in and announces that a philanthropist and his daughter are arriving to visit them. In order to look poorer, Thénardier puts out the fire and breaks a chair. He also orders Azelma to punch out a window pane, which she does, resulting in cutting her hand (as Thénardier had hoped).

The philanthropist and his daughter—actually Valjean and Cosette—enter. Marius immediately recognizes Cosette. After seeing them, Valjean promises to return with rent money for them. After he and Cosette leave, Marius asks Éponine to retrieve her address for him. Éponine, who is in love with Marius herself, reluctantly agrees. The Thénardiers have also recognized Valjean and Cosette, and vow their revenge. Thénardier enlists the aid of Patron-Minette, a well-known and feared gang of murderers and robbers.

Marius overhears Thénardier's plan and goes to Javert to report the crime. Javert gives Marius two pistols and instructs him to fire one into the air if things get dangerous. Marius returns home and waits for Javert and the police to arrive. Thénardier sends Éponine and Azelma outside to look out for the police. When Valjean returns with rent money, Thénardier, with Patron-Minette, ambushes him, revealing his true identity. Marius recognizes Thénardier as the man who saved his father's life at Waterloo and is caught in a dilemma.

He tries to find a way to save Valjean while not betraying Thénardier. Valjean denies knowing Thénardier and tells him that they have never met. Valjean tries to escape through a window but is subdued and tied up. Thénardier orders Valjean to pay him 200,000 francs. He also orders Valjean to write a letter to Cosette to return to the apartment, saying they will keep her with them until he delivers the money. After Valjean writes the letter and informs Thénardier of his address, Thénardier sends out Mme. Thénardier to get Cosette. Mme. Thénardier comes back alone and announces the address is a fake.

It is during this time that Valjean manages to free himself. Thénardier decides to kill Valjean. While he and Patron-Minette are about to do so, Marius remembers the scrap of paper that Éponine wrote on earlier. He throws it into the Thénardiers' apartment through the wall crack. Thénardier reads it and thinks Éponine threw it inside. He, Mme. Thénardier, and Patron-Minette try to escape, only to be stopped by Javert.

He arrests all the Thénardiers and Patron-Minette (except Claquesous, who escapes during his transportation to prison, and Montparnasse, who stops to run off with Éponine instead of joining in on the robbery). Valjean manages to escape the scene before Javert sees him.

=== Volume IV: The Idyll in the Rue Plumet and the Epic in the Rue St. Denis ===
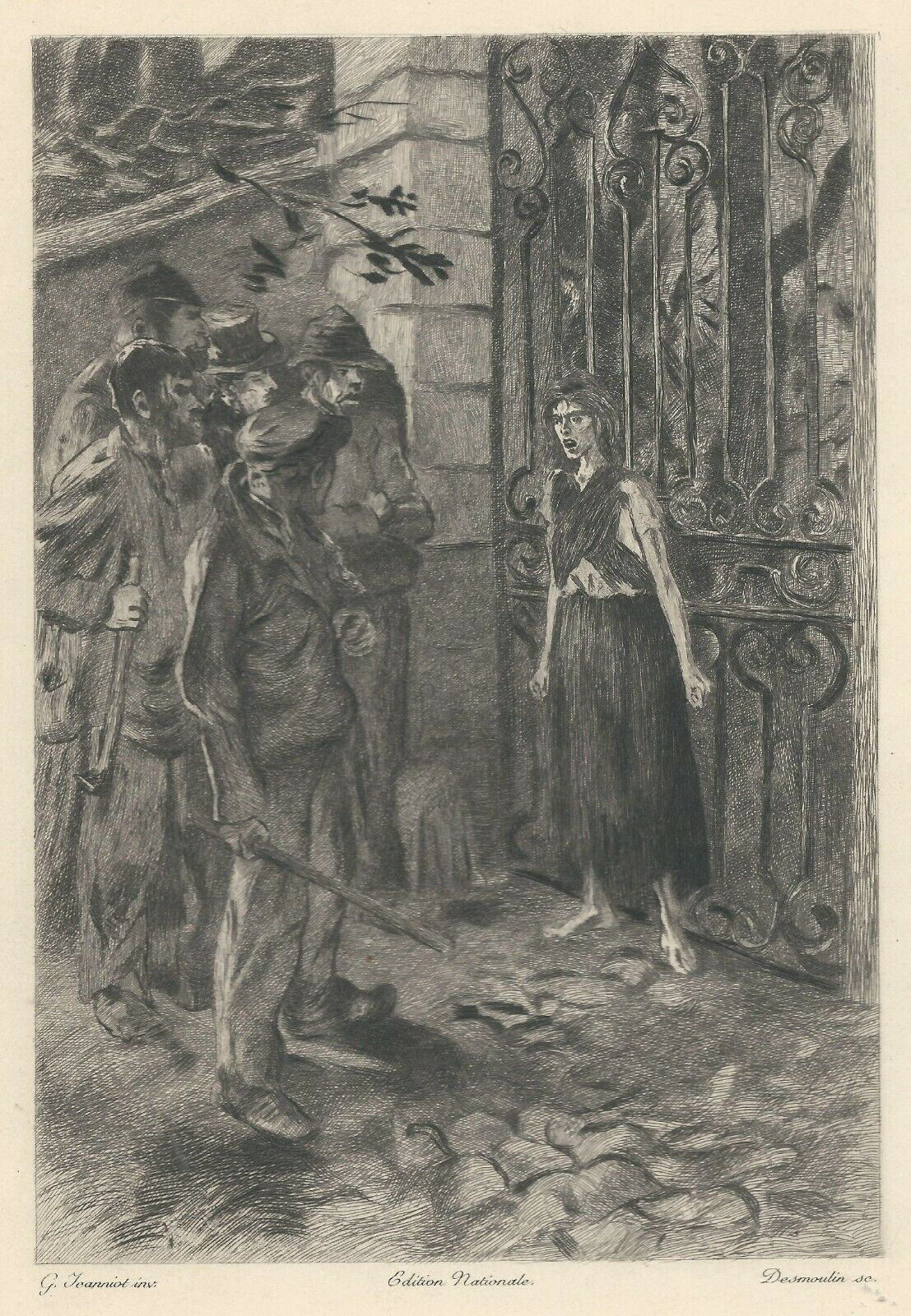
Éponine prevents the robbery at Valjean's house.

After Éponine's release from prison, she finds Marius at "the Field of the Lark" and sadly tells him that she found Cosette's address. She leads him to Valjean and Cosette's house on Rue Plumet, and Marius watches the house for a few days. He and Cosette then finally meet and declare their love for one another. Thénardier, Patron-Minette, and Brujon manage to escape from prison with the aid of Gavroche (a rare case of Gavroche helping his family in their criminal activities). One night, during one of Marius's visits with Cosette, the six men attempt to raid Valjean and Cosette's house. However, Éponine, who has been sitting by the gates, threatens to scream and awaken the whole neighbourhood if the thieves do not leave. Hearing this, they reluctantly retire. Meanwhile, Cosette informs Marius that she and Valjean will be leaving for England in a week, which greatly troubles the pair.

The next day, Valjean is sitting in the Champ de Mars. He is feeling troubled about seeing Thénardier in the neighbourhood several times. Unexpectedly, a note lands in his lap. It says, "Move Out." He sees a figure running away in the dim light. He goes home, tells Cosette they will be staying at their other house on Rue de l'Homme-Armé, and restates that they will be moving to England. Marius tries to get permission from M. Gillenormand to marry Cosette. His grandfather seems stern and angry but has been longing for Marius's return. When tempers flare, he refuses to consent to the marriage, telling Marius to make Cosette his mistress instead. Insulted, Marius leaves.

The following day, the students revolt and erect barricades in the narrow streets of Paris. Gavroche spots Javert and informs Enjolras that he is a spy. When Enjolras confronts Javert about this, he admits his identity and his orders to spy on the students. Enjolras and the other students tie him to a pole in the Corinth restaurant. Later that evening, Marius returns to Valjean and Cosette's house on Rue Plumet but finds it no longer occupied. He then hears a voice telling him that his friends are waiting for him at the barricade. Distraught to find Cosette gone, he heeds the voice and goes.

When Marius arrives at the barricade, the revolution has already started. When he stoops down to pick up a powder keg, a soldier comes up to shoot him. However, a man covers the muzzle of the soldier's gun with his hand. The soldier fires, fatally wounding the man while missing Marius. Meanwhile, the soldiers are closing in. Marius climbs to the top of the barricade, holding a torch in one hand, and a powder keg in the other, and threatens to the soldiers that he will blow up the barricade. After confirming this, the soldiers retreat from the barricade.

Marius decides to go to the smaller barricade, which he finds empty. As he turns back, the man who took the fatal shot for him earlier calls him by his name. Marius discovers this man is Éponine, dressed in men's clothes. As she lies dying on his knees, she confesses that she was the one who told him to go to the barricade, hoping they would die together. She also confesses to saving his life because she wanted to die before he did.

The author also tells the reader that Éponine anonymously threw the note to Valjean. Éponine then tells Marius that she has a letter for him. She also confesses to having obtained the letter the day before, originally not planning to give it to him but deciding to do so for fear he would be angry at her about it in the afterlife. After Marius takes the letter, Éponine then asks him to kiss her on the forehead when she is dead, which he promises to do. With her last breath, she confesses that she was "a little bit in love" with him, and dies.

Marius fulfills her request and goes into a tavern to read the letter. It is from Cosette. He learns Cosette's whereabouts and writes a farewell letter to her. He sends Gavroche to deliver it to her, but Gavroche leaves it with Valjean. Valjean, learning that Cosette's lover is fighting, is at first relieved, but an hour later, he puts on a National Guard uniform, arms himself with a gun and ammunition, and leaves his home.

=== Volume V: Jean Valjean ===
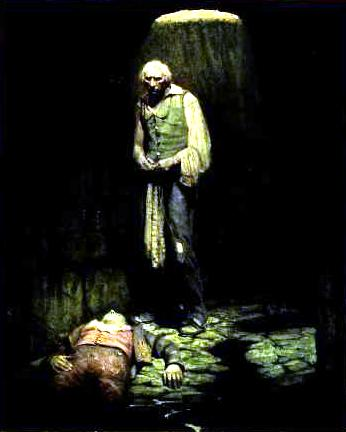
Valjean in the sewers with the wounded Marius (US edition, 1900)

Valjean arrives at the barricade and immediately saves a man's life. He is still uncertain if he wants to protect Marius or kill him. Marius recognizes Valjean at first sight. Enjolras announces that they are almost out of cartridges. When Gavroche goes outside the barricade to collect more ammunition from the dead National Guardsmen, he is shot dead.

Valjean volunteers to execute Javert himself, and Enjolras grants permission. Valjean takes Javert out of sight and then shoots into the air while letting him go. Marius mistakenly believes that Valjean has killed Javert. As the barricade falls, Valjean carries off the injured and unconscious Marius. All the other students are killed. Valjean escapes through the sewers, carrying Marius's body. He evades a police patrol and reaches an exit gate but finds it locked. Thénardier emerges from the darkness. Valjean recognizes Thénardier, but Thénardier doesn't recognize Valjean. Thinking Valjean a murderer lugging his victim's corpse, Thénardier offers to open the gate for money. As he searches Valjean's and Marius's pockets, he surreptitiously tears off a piece of Marius's coat so he can determine his identity later. Thénardier takes the thirty francs he finds, opens the gate, and allows Valjean to leave, expecting Valjean's emergence from the sewer to distract the policeman who has been pursuing him.

Upon exiting, Valjean encounters Javert and requests time to return Marius to his family before surrendering to him. Surprisingly, Javert agrees, assuming that Marius will be dead within minutes. After leaving Marius at his grandfather's house, Valjean asks for a brief visit to his own home, and Javert agrees. There, Javert tells Valjean he will wait for him in the street, but when Valjean scans the street from the landing window, he finds Javert has gone. Javert walks down the street, realizing that he is caught between his strict belief in the law and the mercy Valjean has shown him. He feels he can no longer give Valjean up to the authorities but cannot ignore his duty to the law either. Unable to cope with this dilemma, Javert commits suicide by throwing himself into the Seine.

Marius slowly recovers from his injuries. As he and Cosette make wedding preparations, Valjean endows them with a fortune of nearly 600,000 francs. As their wedding party winds through Paris during Mardi Gras festivities, Valjean is spotted by Thénardier, who then orders Azelma to follow him. After the wedding, Valjean confesses to Marius that he is an ex-convict. Marius is horrified, assumes the worst about Valjean's moral character, and contrives to limit Valjean's time with Cosette. Valjean accedes to Marius's judgment and his separation from Cosette. Valjean loses the will to live and retires to his bed.

Thénardier approaches Marius in disguise, but Marius recognizes him. Thénardier attempts to blackmail Marius with what he knows of Valjean, but in doing so, he inadvertently corrects Marius's misconceptions about Valjean by revealing all the good he has done. He tries to convince Marius that Valjean is a murderer and presents the piece of coat he tore off as evidence. Stunned, Marius recognizes the fabric as part of his own coat and realizes that it was Valjean who rescued him from the barricade. Marius pulls out a fistful of notes and flings it at Thénardier's face. He then confronts Thénardier about his crimes and offers him an immense sum to depart and never return. Thénardier accepts the offer, and he and Azelma travel to America, where he becomes a slave trader.

As they rush to Valjean's house, Marius tells Cosette that Valjean saved his life at the barricade. They arrive to find Valjean near death and reconcile with him. Valjean tells Cosette her mother's story and name. He dies content and is buried beneath a blank slab in Père Lachaise Cemetery.

== Contemporary reception ==
The appearance of the novel was a highly anticipated event, as Victor Hugo was considered one of France's foremost poets in the middle of the nineteenth century. The New York Times announced its forthcoming publication as early as April 1860. Hugo forbade his publishers from summarizing his story and refused to authorize the publication of excerpts in advance of publication. He instructed them to build on his earlier success and suggested this approach: "What Victor H. did for the Gothic world in Notre-Dame of Paris [The Hunchback of Notre-Dame], he accomplishes for the modern world in Les Misérables". A massive advertising campaign preceded the release of the first two volumes of Les Misérables in Brussels on 30 or 31 March and in Paris on 3 April 1862. The remaining volumes appeared on 15 May 1862.

Critical reactions were wide-ranging and often negative. Some critics found the subject matter immoral, others complained of its excessive sentimentality, and others were disquieted by its apparent sympathy with the revolutionaries. L. Gauthier wrote in Le Monde on 17 August 1862, "One cannot read without an unconquerable disgust all the details Monsieur Hugo gives regarding the successful planning of riots." The Goncourt brothers judged the novel artificial and disappointing. Flaubert found "neither truth nor greatness" in it. He complained that the characters were crude stereotypes who all "speak very well – but all in the same way". He deemed it an "infantile" effort and brought an end to Hugo's career like "the fall of a god". In a newspaper review, Charles Baudelaire praised Hugo's success in focusing public attention on social problems, though he believed that such propaganda was the opposite of art. In private, he castigated it as "repulsive and inept" (immonde et inepte).

The work was a commercial success and has been a popular book ever since it was published. Translated the same year it appeared into several foreign languages, including Italian, Greek, and Portuguese, it proved popular not only in France but across Europe and abroad.

== English translations ==
- Charles E. Wilbour. New York: Carleton Publishing Company, June 1862. The first English translation. The first volume was available for purchase in New York beginning 7 June 1862. Also New York and London: George Routledge and Sons, 1879.
- Lascelles Wraxall. London: Hurst and Blackett, October 1862. The first British translation.
- Translator identified as "A.F." Richmond, Virginia, 1863. Published by West and Johnston publishers. The Editor's Preface announces its intention of correcting errors in Wilbour's translation. It said that some passages "exclusively intended for the French readers of the book" were being omitted, as well as "[a] few scattered sentences reflecting on slavery" because "the absence of a few antislavery paragraphs will hardly be complained of by Southern readers." Because of paper shortages in wartime, the passages omitted became longer with each successive volume.
- Isabel Florence Hapgood. Published 1887, this translation is available at Project Gutenberg.
- Norman Denny. Folio Press, 1976. A modern British translation later re-published in paperback by Penguin Books, ISBN 0-14-044430-0. The translator explains in an introduction that he has placed two of the novel's longer digressive passages into appendices and made some minor abridgements in the text.
- Lee Fahnestock and Norman McAfee. Signet Classics. 3 March 1987. An unabridged edition based on the Wilbour translation with its language modernized. Paperback ISBN 0-451-52526-4
- Julie Rose. 2007. Vintage Classics, 3 July 2008. A new translation of the full work, with a detailed biographical sketch of Victor Hugo's life, a chronology, and notes. ISBN 978-0-09-951113-7
- Christine Donougher. Penguin Classics, 7 November 2013. A new translation of the full work, with a detailed biographical sketch of Victor Hugo's life, a chronology, and notes. ISBN 978-0141393599

== Adaptations ==
Since its original publication, Les Misérables has been the subject of a large number of adaptations in numerous types of media, such as books, films, musicals, plays and games.

Notable examples of these adaptations include:

- The 1934 film, 4½-hour French version directed by Raymond Bernard and starring Harry Baur, Charles Vanel, Florelle, Josseline Gaël and Jean Servais
- The 1935 film directed by Richard Boleslawski, starring Fredric March and Charles Laughton, and nominated for Best Picture, Best Film Editing, and Best Assistant Director at the 8th Academy Awards
- The 1937 radio adaptation by Orson Welles
- The 1952 film adaptation directed by Lewis Milestone and starring Michael Rennie and Robert Newton
- The 1958 film adaptation directed by Jean-Paul Le Chanois, with an international cast starring Jean Gabin, Bernard Blier, and Bourvil. Called "the most memorable film version", it was filmed in East Germany and was overtly political.
- The 1978 television film adaptation, starring Richard Jordan and Anthony Perkins
- The 1980 musical by Alain Boublil and Claude-Michel Schönberg
- The 1982 film adaptation directed by Robert Hossein and starring Lino Ventura and Michel Bouquet
- The 1995 film by Claude Lelouch, starring Jean-Paul Belmondo
- The 1998 film, starring Liam Neeson and Geoffrey Rush
- The 2000 TV miniseries, starring Gérard Depardieu and John Malkovich.
- The 2007 TV anime adaptation by studio Nippon Animation
- The 2010 concert, starring Alfie Boe, Norm Lewis, Samantha Barks, and Lea Salonga performed at the O2 Arena.
- The 2012 film of the musical, starring Hugh Jackman, Russell Crowe, Anne Hathaway, and Amanda Seyfried
- A 2018 British TV series by Andrew Davies, starring Dominic West, David Oyelowo, and Lily Collins

=== Sequels ===
- Laura Kalpakian's Cosette: The Sequel to Les Misérables was published in 1995. It continues the story of Cosette and Marius but is more a sequel to the musical than to the original novel.
- In 2001, two French novels by François Cérésa that continue Hugo's story appeared: Cosette ou le temps des illusions and Marius ou le fugitif. The former has been published in an English translation. Javert appears as a hero who survived his suicide attempt and becomes religious; Thénardier returns from America; Marius is unjustly imprisoned. The works were the subject of an unsuccessful lawsuit, Société Plon et autres v. Pierre Hugo et autres, brought by Hugo's great-great-grandson.

== See also ==
- Fex urbis lex orbis
- Jean Val Jean, abridged version in English (1935)
