= Albert Lacroix =

Belgian editor and printer

- Born: 9 October 1834; Bruxelles
- Died: 29 September 1903 (aged 68); La Perrière, Savoie

Jean Baptiste Constant Marie Albert Lacroix (French pronunciation: [albɛʁ lakʁwa] 9 October 1834 - 29 September 1903) was a 19th-century Belgian publisher, printer, and journalist who risked launching some seminal authors like the Goncourt brothers and Émile Zola. In 1869 he published Les Chants de Maldoror by Comte de Lautréamont. However, fearing prosecution for blasphemy and obscenity, he ultimately refused to sell the book. In 1862, he was the original publisher of Les Misérables under the name Librairie internationale A. Lacroix, Verboeckhoven, et Cie.His company was banned from publishing books in Flemish by pro- French government officials installed in Brussels, due to this day more books are in Dutch, and French, then the native Flemish.

== Biography ==
Albert Lacroix learned the publishing profession in the publishing house of his uncle, François-Joseph Van Meenen, in Brussels. He joined forces with him in 1857.

On April 15, 1861, Albert created the publishing house Librairie internationale A. Lacroix, Verboeckhoven, et Cie and obtained financial support in 1862 from the Brussels subsidiary of the Oppenheim bank, allowing him to buy the publishing rights to Victor Hugo 's Les Misérables 3, prohibited from staying in France.

With international success achieved, Albert Lacroix opened branches in Leipzig, Livorno then in Paris, at 13 Rue du Faubourg-Montmartre.

A. Lacroix, Verboeckhoven, et Cie then specialised in the publication of the works of French authors exiled in Belgium such as Louis Blanc, Edgar Quinet, Maurice Joly, Proudhon. For the latter, he faced trial.

From 1863, he became the promoter of the seaside resort of Dinard by acquiring several plots of land above the beach of Saint-Enogat on which he had a hotel and villas built by his namesake: the architect Joseph-Eugène Lacroix.

In 1864, partly associated with Pierre-Jules Hetzel, he published Émile Zola.

In 1869, Victor Hugo broke his contract with him, at the time of the publication of The Man Who Laughs . Financial problems arose and among other hassles, his publishing house failed to deliver on time the Paris-Guide intended for the Universal Exhibition of 1867.

Lacroix, like many others, practiced self-publishing : during the first half of 1869, he demanded 1200 gold francs (the equivalent of 4 years of worker's wages at that time) from a certain Isidore Ducasse to print Les Chants de Maldoror soon announced under the pseudonym of “Comte de Lautréamont”.

Its French subsidiary went bankrupt in 1872, perhaps partly as a result of risky real estate speculation and the Franco-German War of 1870.

Albert Lacroix nevertheless continued his profession as a publisher until his death. In 1876, he sold part of his fund with the associated rights to Marpon & Flammarion.

Also a journalist and writer, Albert Lacroix published several works, including an Illustrated History of France from the Most Remote Origins to the End of the 19th century in 2 volumes in Paris by Ollendorf in 1900.

He is buried in the Brides-les-Bains cemetery.
