= Patron-Minette =

Fictional gang

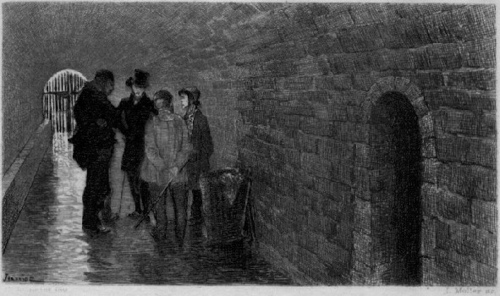
- The Patron-Minette gang in their hide-out in the Paris sewer system. Illustration by Pierre-Georges Jeanniot
- Created by: Victor Hugo

In-universe information
- Nationality: French

Patron-Minette was the name given to a street gang in Victor Hugo's 1862 novel Les Misérables and the musical of the same name. The gang consisted of four criminals: Montparnasse, Claquesous, Babet, and Gueulemer/Brujon. They were well acquainted with the Thénardiers, who recruited them to assist in robbing Jean Valjean.

Hugo explains that the name "Patron-Minette" is an old-fashioned slang expression for the early dawn, "the hour at which their work ended, the dawn being the vanishing moment for phantoms and for the separation of ruffians".

== Character descriptions ==
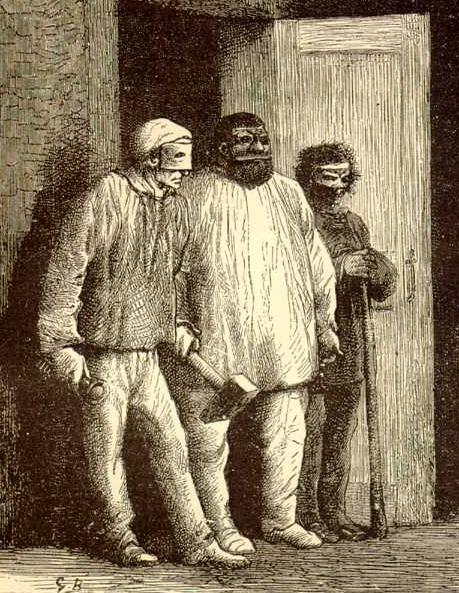
Three members of Patron-Minette in theatrical masks in the commedia dell'arte style

Montparnasse was, in the words of Hugo, "scarcely more than a child, a youth of under twenty with a scary face, cherry-lips, glossy dark hair and the brightness of Springtime in his eyes. ... The gamin turned vagabond and the vagabond become an assassin ... A fashion plate living in squalor and committing murder." He is referred to as Thénardier's "unofficial son-in-law" after having an intimate liaison with Éponine during the attempted robbery at Gorbeau house. In a later attempt to mug Valjean he is easily overpowered. After lecturing the thief, Valjean gives him a purse with a little over six napoléons inside, (Note: The usual napoléon of this period was worth 20 francs, i.e. 120 francs in total) but Gavroche steals it to give to M. Mabeuf, an old horticulturist that was falling into debt. Montparnasse later seeks out Gavroche to help Thénardier escape from prison.

Claquesous is described by Hugo as a creature of the night, and a vague underworld dweller at best, a ventriloquist, more often masked than not and shrouded in a thick cloud of mystery. He is possibly a police informer, given his almost miraculous talent for escaping police custody, most notably after Javert captures the gang at Gorbeau house. Javert ponders, "Had Claquesous melted into the shadows like a snow-flake in water? Had there been unavowed connivance of the police agents?" Under the name of Le Cabuc he joins the revolutionaries at the barricade, where he is shot by Enjolras for murdering an innocent citizen. Hugo suggests that he may have been sent to discredit the revolutionaries.

Babet was a jack of all trades, a performer, a doctor, tall and thin with "daylight ... visible through his bones". He had a family (a wife and children) at one point, but lost them "as one loses a pocket handkerchief".

Gueulemer is described as the most physically imposing of the gang members, "a Hercules ... come down in the world". However, he was known to have very little brain.

== In the novel ==
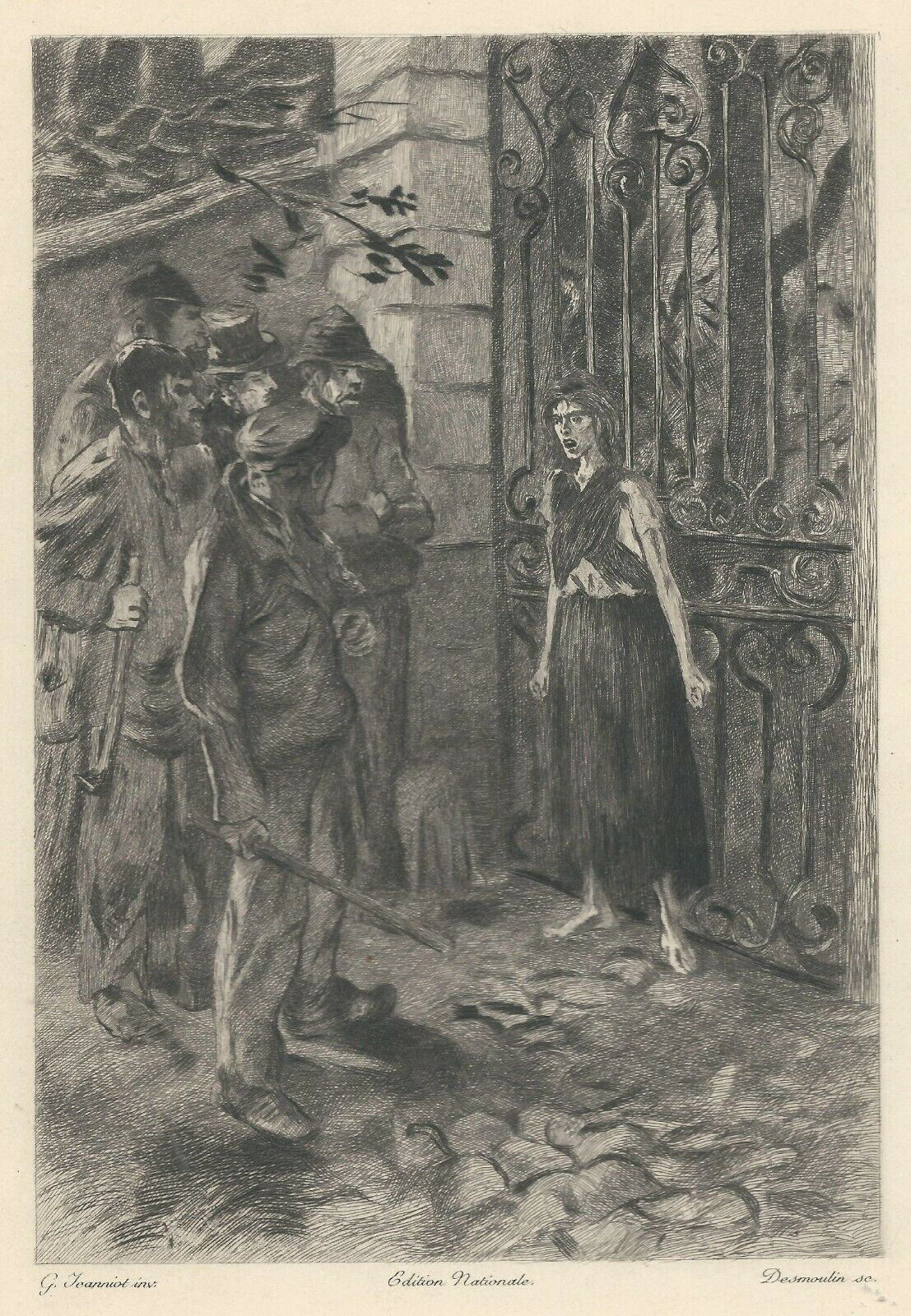
Éponine intervenes to stop the gang robbing Valjean's home

The gang are introduced with one of Hugo's long philosophical disquisitions on the relationship between different kinds of underground culture, set up as a contrast with the student revolutionaries of the Friends of the ABC. Their identities are constantly shifting, via a series of assumed names.

Anne Ubersfeld notes that they are associated with theatre, all having worked in street theatre as bit-part actors or clowns, creating "a theatricality in the lower depths, a social theatre of crime, a carnival of horror". When they are contacted by Thenadier to rob Valjean, they wear theatrical masks. Valjean frees Javert from the revolutionaries, just as Javert's intervention rescued Valjean from the gang's attempt to rob him.

They are also linked to irrationality and superstition. When Éponine intervenes to disrupt their plan to invade Valjean's house, the gang withdraws after convincing themselves that they have witnessed a series of bad omens.

Book 7 of Part 3 (Marius) is called Patron-Minette. Initially, the books had 9 chapters but Victor Hugo allowed the publisher, Albert Lacroix to excise 7 digressive chapters (chapters 3 to 9) and split the first 2 chapters into the 4 chapters Book 7 of Part 3 currently contains. This is the only cut that the author allowed the publisher to make. The chapters are included in some French Editions in the Notes and Variants section at the end of the book. The English translators have left the excised chapters untranslated.

== In the musical ==
The character of Gueulemer is replaced by Brujon, a criminal who appears in the novel as an associate of the gang but not as one of the Patron-Minette quartet. The gang first appears in Look Down/The Robbery/Javert's Intervention at which point they are introduced to the audience by Thénardier ("Everyone here?/You know your place./ Brujon, Babet, Claquesous!/ You, Montparnasse/ Watch for the law with Éponine..."). Montparnasse also appears in a brief scene with Éponine at the beginning of "The Attack on Rue Plumet", in which she discovers the impending attack on Valjean's house. That scene is often cut from recordings. The gang attempts to rob Jean Valjean's house until Éponine, afraid that Marius will think her a criminal, screams to send them away.
