= Gavroche =

Fictional character in Les Misérables

- Les Misérables character
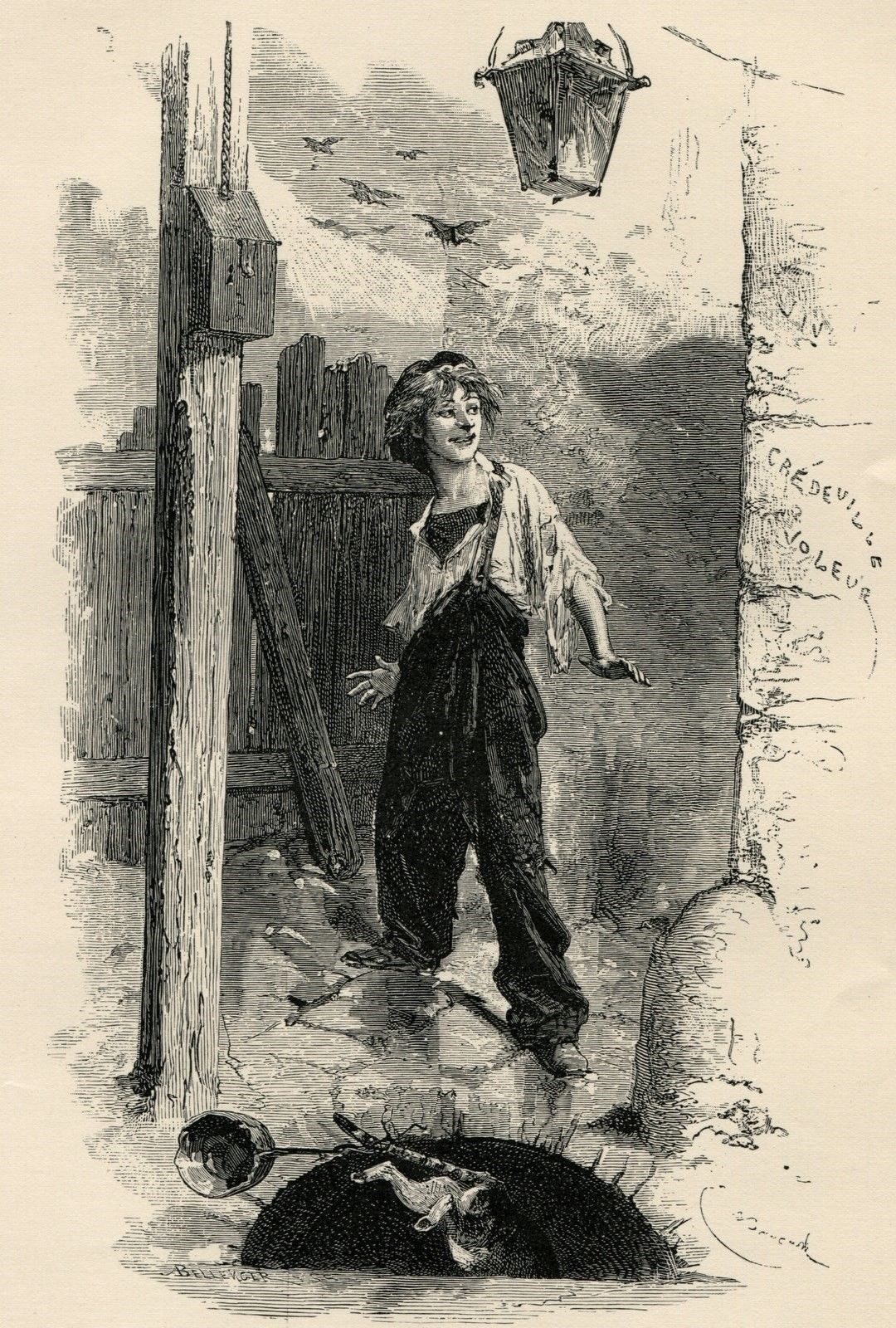
- Illustration of Gavroche by Émile Bayard (1837-1891)
- Created by: Victor Hugo

In-universe information
- Full name: Gavroche Thénardier
- Gender: Male
- Occupation: Street child Revolutionary
- Affiliation: Les Amis de l'ABC (Friends of the ABC)
- Family: Monsieur Thénardier (father); Madame Thénardier (mother); Éponine Thénardier (sister); Azelma Thénardier (sister); Two unnamed younger brothers
- Nationality: French
- Born: 1820
- Death: 1832

Gavroche (French pronunciation: [ɡavʁɔʃ]) is a fictional character in the 1862 novel Les Misérables by Victor Hugo. He is a boy who lives on the streets of Paris. His name has become a synonym for an urchin or street child. Gavroche plays a short yet significant role in the many adaptations of Les Misérables, sharing the populist ideology of the Friends of the ABC and joining the revolutionaries in the June 1832 rebellion. He figures in the 3rd, 4th, and 5th parts of the novel.

== In the novel ==
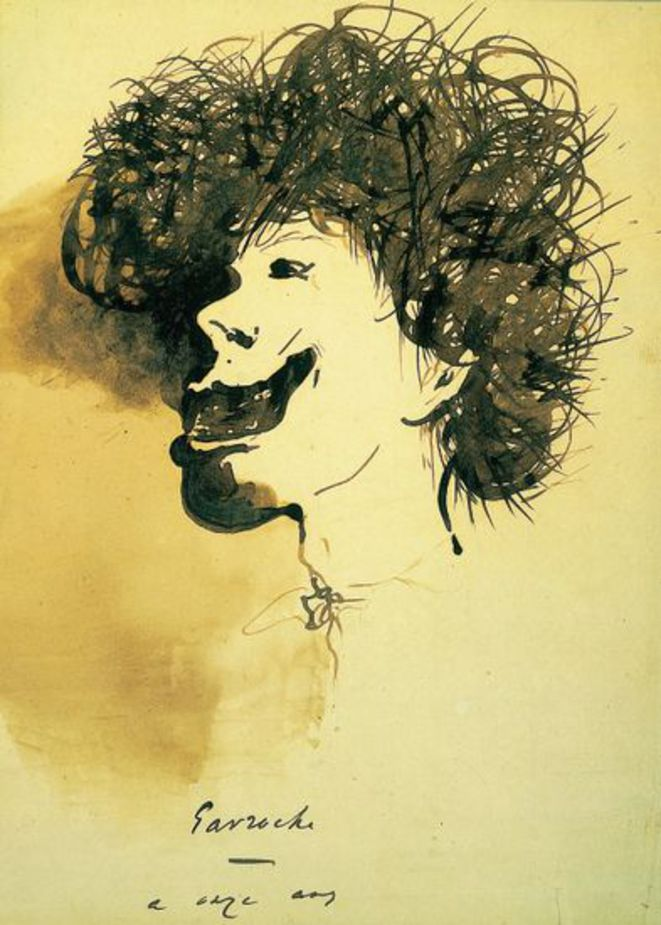
Gavroche a 11 ans (Gavroche aged 11), pen and ink drawing by Victor Hugo

Gavroche is the eldest son of Monsieur and Madame Thénardier. He has two older sisters, Éponine and Azelma, and two unnamed younger brothers. Hugo never provides his given name but says Gavroche has chosen his own name. His parents show him no affection and send him to live in the street, where he is better off than at home.

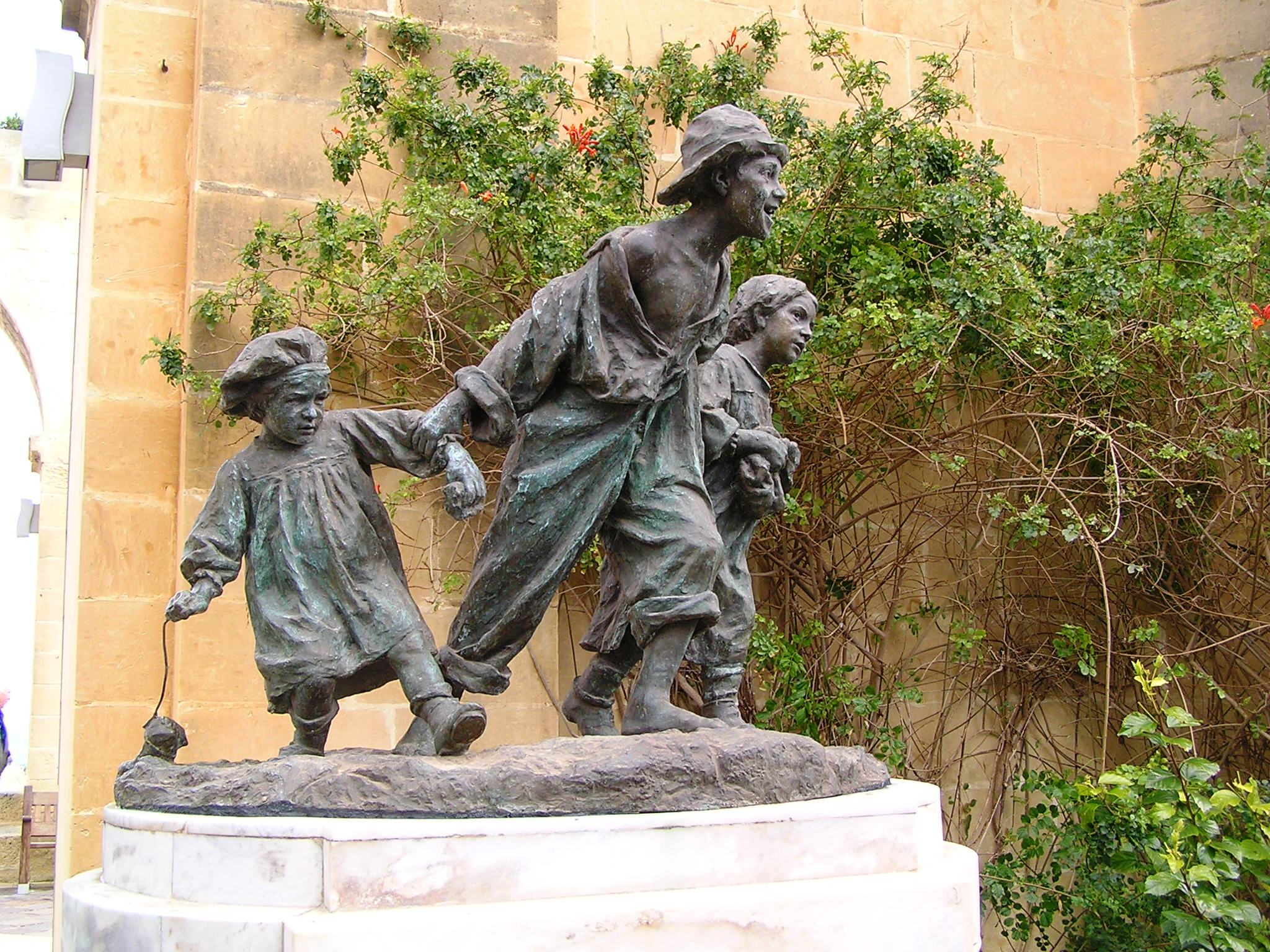
Les Gavroches, a replica of the 1904 sculpture by Antonio Sciortino in the Upper Barrakka Gardens, Valletta, Malta.

The Thénardiers sell (or lend) their two youngest sons to a woman named Magnon.

Due to a freak accident, the two boys are separated from Magnon without identification, and encounter Gavroche purely by chance. They are unaware of their identities, but Gavroche invites them to live with him and takes care of them. They reside in the hollow cavity of a giant elephant statue, the Elephant of the Bastille conceived by Napoleon as a fountain, but abandoned unfinished. Located at the Place de la Bastille, it was designed by Jean-Antoine Alavoine. The two boys soon leave Gavroche the next morning. They are last seen at the Luxembourg Garden retrieving and eating discarded bread from a fountain. It is unknown what has happened to the two after that.

At dawn, Gavroche helps his father, Patron-Minette and Brujon escape from prison due to the request of Montparnasse.

During the student uprising of June 5–6, 1832, Gavroche joins the revolutionaries at the barricade. After an exchange of gunfire with the National Guards, Gavroche overhears Enjolras remark that they are running out of cartridges. He decides he can help. He goes through an opening in the barricade and collects the cartridges from the dead bodies of the National Guard. In the process of collecting the cartridges and singing a song, he is shot and killed.

== Inspiration and character ==
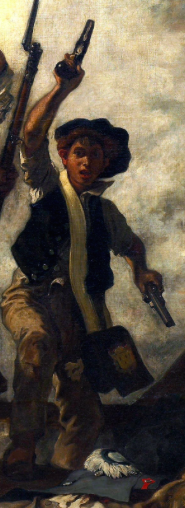
A closeup of the young boy in the painting Liberty Leading the People by Eugène Delacroix, waving pistols. He is alongside Liberty.

The character of Gavroche may have been inspired by a figure in Eugène Delacroix's painting Liberty Leading the People, which depicts the successful 1830 July Revolution, two years before the events described in the novel. The painting depicts revolutionaries advancing from a barricade over the bodies of government troops. A young boy waving pistols leads the way, beside the figure of Liberty herself carrying the tricolore. The boy carries a cartridge box over his shoulder. The painting, commissioned by the new government, was taken down in 1832 after the June Rebellion described in the novel because of its revolutionary message. Champfleury wrote in August 1848 that it had been "hidden in an attic for being too revolutionary". According to Albert Boime, "after the uprising at the funeral of Lamarque in June 1832 it was never again openly displayed for fear of setting a bad example".

Gavroche's death can also remind of the death of Joseph Agricol Viala, a child hero of the French Revolution. Like Gavroche, he was killed while adventuring himself on open terrain between two fighting forces in order to accomplish a non-hostile yet essential action for his faction.

Mario Vargas Llosa calls Gavroche "one of the most appealing and tender characters in fiction", who, despite his relatively small role in the novel, "brings a breath of happiness and humanity a love of life, wit, goodness, and courage in the face of adversity. His purity of spirit is strengthened rather than diminished by poverty, homelessness, and injustice." Where other characters are hardened by experience, Gavroche lives by his wits and shows kindness to everyone he encounters. In his view, as Javert embodies rigor and order, Gavroche represents the unruly, eccentric, and imaginative.

Victor Brombert sees Gavroche as the embodiment of Hugo's themes of "the political implications of popular speech and popular laughter. The people of Paris are like this irrepressible child, with a "grim love of freedom and courage" but still in need of education and political formation."

John Frey says that Gavroche possesses "a Gallic spirit (l'esprit gaulois), unknown to the more serious child outcasts found in the novels of Charles Dickens, little Joe, for example, in Bleak House". In other words, Gavroche is cheerful and resourceful rather than a victim. According to Frey, because of his basic honesty and "good will" he would never be suspected of being a member of the Thénardier clan, and unlike the only other positive Thénardier, Éponine, he is not compromised by continuing to act as a member of the family. Notably however, the creators of the 1980 musical adaptation were inspired to think of Gavroche, and ultimately to create the musical, when watching a London production of Oliver! after Dickens' similar character of The Artful Dodger appeared on stage.

The words of the song sung by Gavroche before his death are a parody of conservative views about the French Revolution: blaming all alleged modern social and moral ills on the influence of Voltaire and Rousseau. Gavroche sings "Joie est mon caractère / C'est la faute à Voltaire / Misère est mon trousseau / C'est la faute à Rousseau." (I have a cheerful character / It's Voltaire's fault / Misery is my bridal gown / It's Rousseau's fault).

=== Argot ===
Argot is the slang used by thieves, criminals, and others who live in the streets. Victor Hugo was one of the first to note the slang and write it down. He uses the character of Gavroche to introduce the concept of argot to the reader. Hugo devotes a lengthy chapter to importance of argot to the evolution of language in order to defend the extensive use he makes of it.

== Adaptations ==
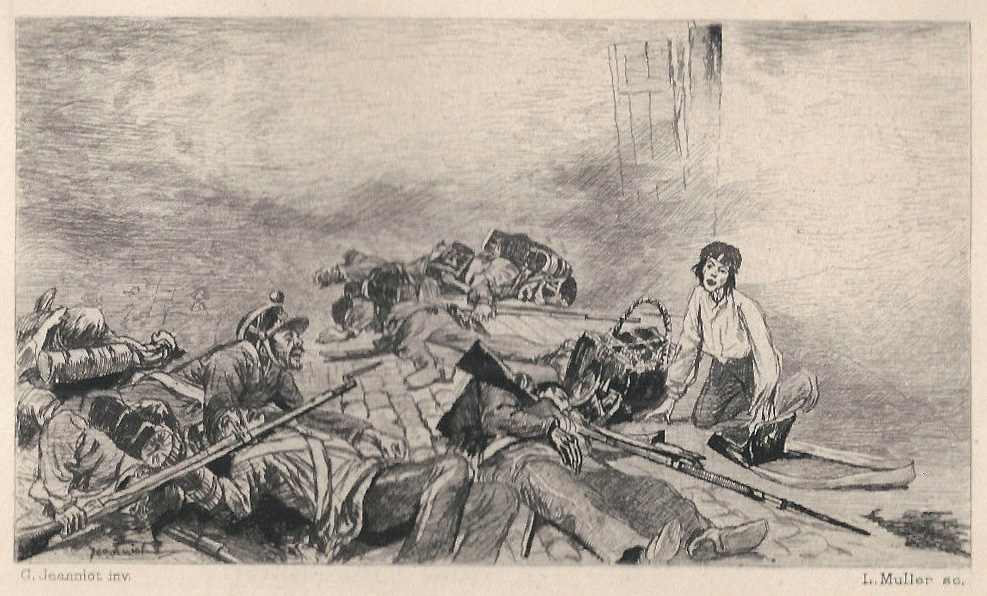
Gavroche singing while collecting cartridges from stricken government troops

Since the original publication of Les Misérables in 1862, the character of Gavroche has been in a large number of adaptations in numerous types of media based on the novel, including books, films, musicals, plays, and games.

=== In the musical ===
French songwriter Alain Boublil had the idea to adapt Victor Hugo's novel into a musical while at a performance of the musical Oliver! in London:

As soon as the Artful Dodger came onstage, Gavroche came to mind. It was like a blow to the solar plexus. I started seeing all the characters of Victor Hugo's Les Misérables—Valjean, Javert, Gavroche, Cosette, Marius, and Éponine—in my mind's eye, laughing, crying, and singing onstage.

== Cultural references ==
- In French, the word Gavroche has come to mean "street urchin" and "mischievous child".
- There is an organization that aids the homeless in Varna, Bulgaria, named the Gavroche Association.
- There is a French-language magazine about Thailand named Gavroche.
- Bulgarian poet Hristo Smirnenski wrote a poem called The Brothers of Gavroche.
- Nobby Nobbs takes the place of Gavroche in Terry Pratchett's Discworld novel Night Watch, which is loosely based on Les Misérables.
- In the French graphic novel series Aspic, Détectives de l'Étrange, Gavroche, having survived the barricades thanks to the mystical watch his father stole at Waterloo, reappears as Hugo Beyle. He teams up with others to fight Moriarty who is helped by the ghost of Javert.
- The French brewery St. Sylvestre has a beer named "Gavroche" in honour of the character.
- There are several restaurants that use the name, including Michelin two-star restaurant Le Gavroche opened in 1967 by Albert Roux and Michel Roux, then owned by Michel Roux Jr., took its name from this character. It closed in 2024.
- The MediaGoblin media-publishing platform has a mascot named "Gavroche".
- Neo-pop artist Teodoru Badiu created the whimsical “Gavroche”, the focal character of the popular Skulltoons NFT project, inspired by Victor Hugo’s work.
- The musical Gavroche is a retelling of the Les Miserables from the point of view of the young characters, mainly Gavroche, his siblings and Amelie. The book, music, and lyrics for Gavroche are by Bonnie Gleicher, based on John Hoover's original concept and book.

== Sources ==
- Les Misérables, Victor Hugo. (Marius, Book I; Saint Denis, Book VI; Jean Valjean, Book I)
