= Thénardiers =

Fictional characters from Les Misérables

Monsieur & Madame Thénardier
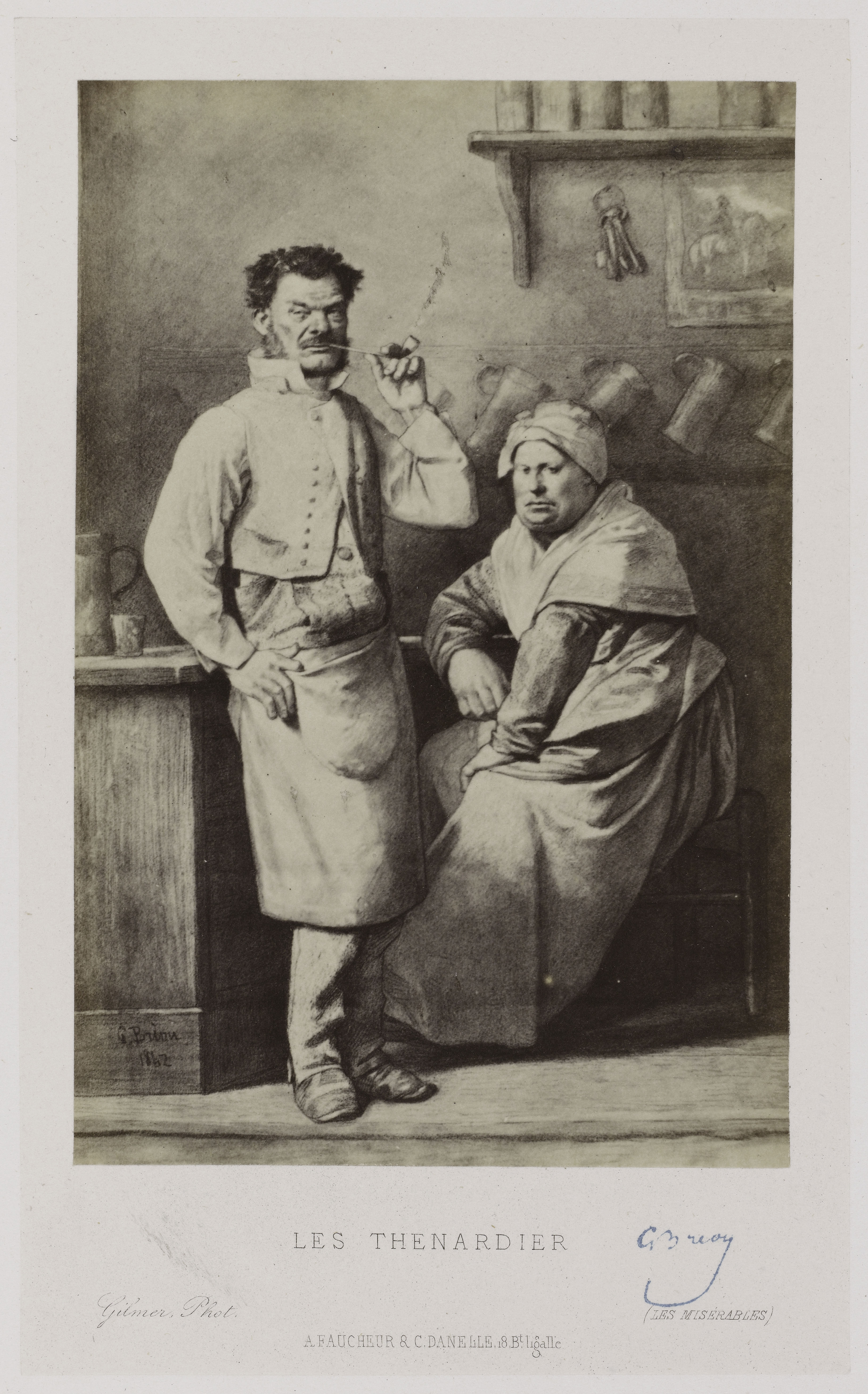
- The Thénardiers, from the first French-language edition (1862), by Gustave Brion
- Created by: Victor Hugo

In-universe information
- Occupation: Innkeepers, criminals, delinquents, swindlers, thieves
- Children: Éponine; Azelma; Gavroche; Two younger sons
- Nationality: French

The Thénardiers, commonly known as Monsieur Thénardier (/təˈnɑːrdieɪ/ tə-NAR-dee-ay, French: [tenaʁdje]) and Madame Thénardier, are fictional characters, and the secondary antagonists in Victor Hugo's 1862 novel Les Misérables and in many adaptations of the novel into other media.

They are unscrupulous working-class people who blame society for their sufferings. Early in the novel, they own an inn and cheat their customers. After they lose the inn in bankruptcy, they change their name to Jondrette and live by begging and petty thievery. They serve, alongside Javert, as one of the two arch-nemeses of the story's protagonist, Jean Valjean. While Javert represents the justice system that would punish Valjean, the Thénardiers represent the lawless subculture of society that would exploit him. The novel portrays them as shameless and abusive figures; some adaptations transform them into buffoonish characters, though sometimes still criminals, to provide comic relief from the generally more serious tone of the story.

== In the novel ==
=== Part One: Fantine ===
When Hugo introduces the Thénardiers, they have two daughters named Éponine and Azelma, whom they spoil and pamper as children, and a son called Gavroche. They run an inn in the town of Montfermeil. The Thénardiers are both described as being very ugly; Monsieur Thénardier is "a skinny little runt, pale, angular, bony, rickety, who looked sick but was as fit as a fiddle" and Madame Thénardier is "tall, blond, ruddy, barrel-like, brawny, boxy, huge, and agile".

Fantine, a struggling single mother, arranges for her daughter Cosette to stay with them, if she pays a regular fee. The Thénardiers treat Cosette quite poorly, dressing her in rags, selling her clothes for 60 francs in the streets of Paris, forcing her to work, and beating her often. Fantine is eventually reduced to working as a prostitute in order to earn enough money to meet the Thenardiers' demands, as M. Thénardier extorts more money from Fantine by claiming that Cosette is ill. The Thénardiers spend the money Fantine sends them on their daughters.

=== Part Two: Cosette ===
After Fantine's death, Jean Valjean arrives in Montfermeil on Christmas Eve. He finds Cosette all alone fetching a pail of water for the Thénardiers in a dark forest and accompanies her back to the inn. After arranging lodgings at the inn for the night, he observes how the Thénardiers abuse her and how Éponine and Azelma mimic their parents' behavior and complain when Cosette plays with their doll. Valjean leaves the inn and returns a moment later with a beautiful new doll, which he offers to Cosette. At first Cosette is unsure if the doll really is for her and is reluctant to take it, but then joyfully accepts it. Mme. Thénardier is furious but M. Thénardier tells her that Valjean can do as he wishes as long as he pays them.

On Christmas Day, Valjean informs the Thénardiers that he wants to take Cosette away with him. Mme. Thénardier immediately agrees, but M. Thénardier feigns affection for Cosette and reluctance to give her up. Valjean pays them 1,500 francs, settling all of Fantine's debts, and he and Cosette leave the inn. M. Thénardier tries to swindle more money out of Valjean. He runs after them and tells Valjean that he has changed his mind and wants Cosette back. He claims that Cosette's mother gave her into their care and that he cannot release Cosette without a note from her mother. Valjean hands him a letter signed by Fantine authorizing him to take charge of Cosette. M. Thénardier orders Valjean to either give back Cosette or pay a thousand crowns, but Valjean ignores him and departs with Cosette. M. Thénardier expresses regret that he did not bring his gun, and turns back to the inn.

=== Part Three: Marius ===
The inn, which is forced to close down after Cosette is taken, is called "The Sergeant at Waterloo", because of a peculiar adventure that M. Thénardier had following the famous battle. While looting the corpses shortly after the fighting had ceased, M. Thénardier accidentally saved the life of a Colonel, The Baron Pontmercy. Not wanting to be caught as a looter, Thénardier claimed himself to be a sergeant of Napoleon's army. The tale as told by Thénardier eventually transformed into one of him rescuing a General during the heat of battle under a hail of grapeshot, as it grew more elaborate with each telling. In a bizarre coincidence, the Thénardier family ends up living next to the disgraced son of the baron, Marius Pontmercy, at an apartment building named Gorbeau House nine years after the closing of the inn.

In the nine years following the inn's closing, the Thénardier family had assumed the name Jondrette. In addition, they had had two more sons, whom they essentially sold to Magnon so that she could pass them off as the children supported by Marius' grandfather M. Gillenormand for the sake of procuring child support. Magnon had accused M. Gillenormand of fathering the two children, which he denied, although he agreed to support them as long as Magnon did not bring him any more children to support. The Thénardiers' eldest son, Gavroche, was left to the streets, where he became a gamin.

The Jondrettes support themselves by sending letters begging for money to well-known philanthropists. Éponine comes in the apartment in a rush and announces that a philanthropist and his daughter are arriving any minute to visit them. In order to look poorer, M. Jondrette puts out their fire and breaks a chair. He then orders Azelma to punch out a window pane. Although hesitant, she does so, resulting in cutting her hand. M. Jondrette is pleased, for he had hoped for that result. The philanthropist and his daughter then come into their apartment; they turn out to be Valjean and Cosette. Marius, observing the Jondrettes through a crack in the wall, recognizes Cosette as the girl he met in the Luxembourg Garden. After their visit, M. Jondrette arranges with Valjean to meet again, but after recognizing Valjean, he plots to rob him upon his arrival with the aid of the street gang Patron-Minette.

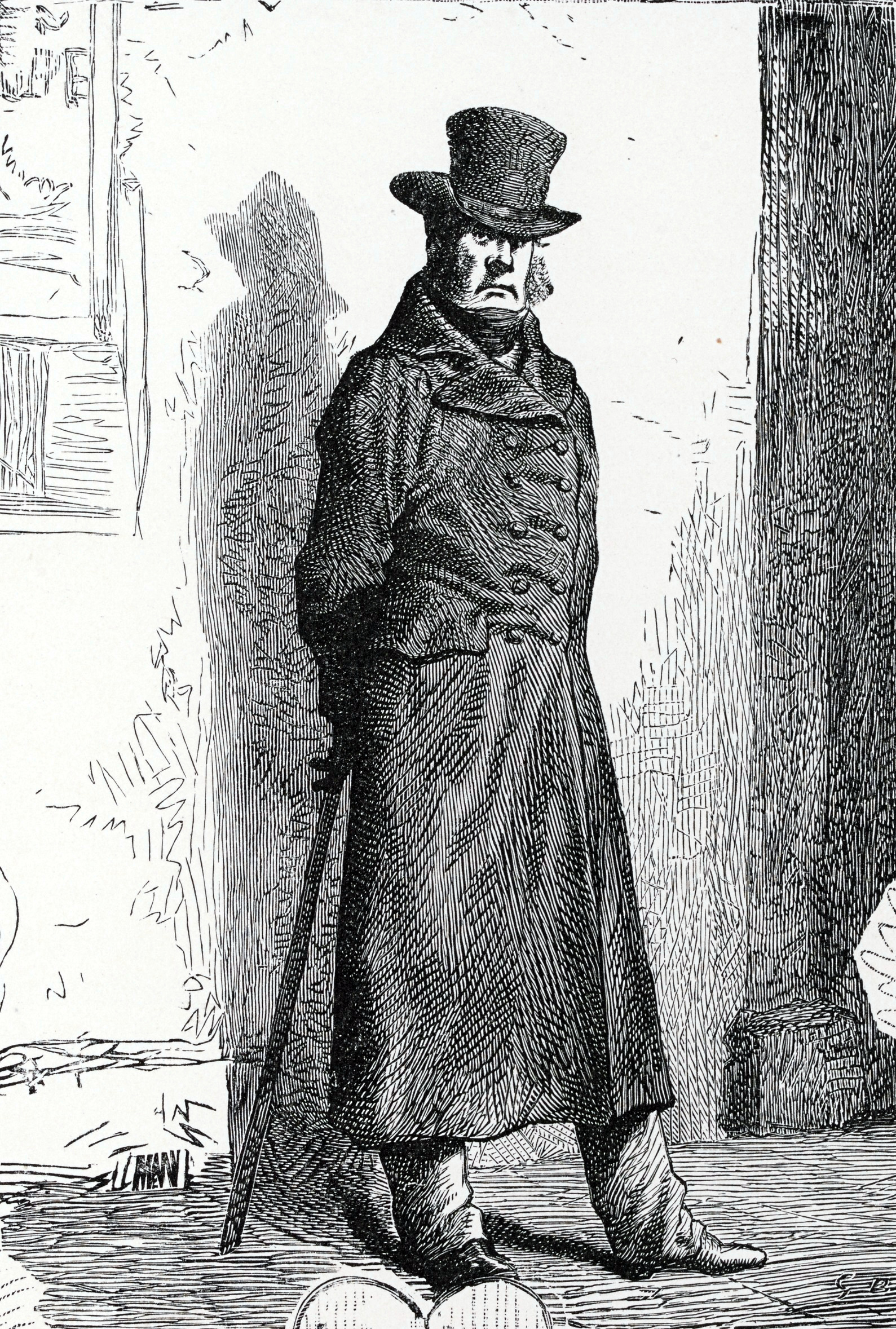
Javert, from the first French-language edition.

Marius learns of M. Jondrette's plan to rob Valjean, and goes to the police. At the police station, an inspector named Javert instructs Marius to stand lookout with two pistols, and to fire as soon as the crime is committed to signal the police to come. Marius returns to his apartment and continues to observe the Jondrettes. M. Jondrette sends Éponine and Azelma outside as look-outs. When Valjean returns with rent money, M. Jondrette and Patron-Minette ambush him and he reveals his real identity: M. Thénardier. Marius, hearing this, recognizes him as the man his father had mentioned in his will as a hero who was due any service that Marius could grant him. Marius, torn between his desire to aid Valjean and his sense of duty to the man who had once saved his father, does not signal the police. Valjean denies knowing M. Thénardier and states that they have never met. Valjean then tries to escape through a window, but he is restrained and tied up. M. Thénardier orders Valjean to write a letter to Cosette, telling her to return to the apartment, where they will keep her as a hostage until Valjean delivers 200,000 francs to him. After Valjean writes the letter and gives his address, M. Thénardier sends out Mme. Thénardier to get Cosette. However, Mme. Thénardier comes back alone, and announces the address Valjean has given is a false address. During her absence, Valjean manages to free himself. M. Thénardier decides with Patron-Minette that they have no choice but to kill Valjean. Marius remembers that Éponine had come into his apartment earlier and wrote on a sheet of paper "The cognes (police) are here" to prove her literacy. Marius grabs the paper and throws it in through the wall crack. M. Thénardier reads it and thinks Éponine threw it inside as a warning. The Thénardiers and Patron-Minette try to escape, but Javert arrives and arrests them all (except Gavroche, who is not present, and Montparnasse, who escapes). Valjean escapes through the window undetected.

=== Part Four: St. Denis ===
Mme. Thénardier dies in prison and Éponine and Azelma are released. Gavroche, not involved with his family's crimes, encounters purely by chance his two younger brothers, who are unaware of their identities. He briefly takes care of them, but they soon leave him in search of their missing foster mother. It is unknown what happened to the two after that.

Éponine is sent by Babet to investigate Valjean's house, but since she knows that Cosette, who now lives with Valjean, is the beloved of her former neighbor Marius (for whom she harbors some affection), sends back a biscuit to Babet (which is code for "not worth the trouble"). She leads Marius to Valjean's house so that he may be with his beloved. M. Thénardier and Patron-Minette, with the aid of Gavroche, manage to escape from jail and attempt to rob Valjean's house. However, Éponine wards them off by threatening to scream. The next day, Éponine tries to tear Cosette and Marius apart by sending Valjean a warning to "move out," and later telling Marius that his friends invited him to fight with them at the barricade at the Rue de la Chanvrerie, intending for both her and Marius to perish in the rebellion of 1832 so that she will not have to share him with Cosette. Both Éponine and Gavroche are killed at Rue de la Chanvrerie, despite Marius' efforts to protect the Thénardier family.

=== Part Five: Jean Valjean ===
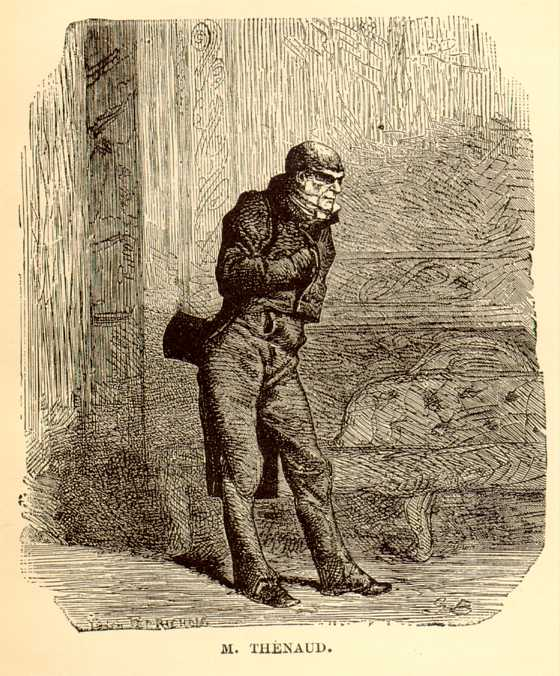
Thénardier presents himself to Marius as "M. Thénard".

Marius himself is wounded in the battle, and Valjean attempts to save him by taking him through the sewers into safety. In the sewers, Valjean encounters Thénardier, who is hiding from Javert. Thinking Valjean to be a simple murderer, Thénardier offers Valjean his key to the sewer grating in exchange for the contents of Marius' pockets. He then searches Valjean and Marius' pockets. Believing Marius to be a corpse, he tears off part of Marius' coat in order to blackmail Valjean with it later. Thénardier finds only 30 francs, reluctantly takes the money, and lets Valjean out.

Thénardier and his child Azelma are in the Mardi Gras parade. When he sees Marius and Cosette's wedding party pass by, he recognizes Valjean as both the man who had ruined him and the man he had met in the sewer, and orders Azelma to follow him and find out where he lives.

Thénardier visits Marius dressed in a rented statesman's suit and identifying himself as "M. Thénard", but Marius eventually recognizes him. Thénardier attempts to blackmail Marius with what he knows about Valjean's past, but he inadvertently corrects Marius' misunderstandings about Valjean and reveals Valjean's good deeds. He then tries to expose Valjean for a murderer, producing the piece of Marius' jacket as proof. Marius realizes that it is a piece of his own jacket, and that that must mean that Valjean saved him from the battle and carried him through the sewers to safety. Marius pulls out his bloodied coat. He tells Thénardier he knows enough of his criminal past "to send you to the galleys", gives him 1500 francs, and orders him to leave and never return. Thénardier moves with Azelma to America, where he becomes a slave trader.

== In the musical ==
The Thénardiers are featured in the musical based on Hugo's novel. They own an inn in the town of Montfermeil, where they have been entrusted with the care of Cosette, Fantine's daughter. However, the Thénardiers treat Cosette as a servant whilst pampering their own daughter Éponine. They welcome all customers to their inn, but whilst they appear to look friendly and welcoming, they secretly con their customers with watered-down wine, sausages made with horse kidney or cat liver, and extra fees for ridiculous things such as lice, looking in their mirrors, and keeping their windows closed. ("Master of the House"). One night after sending Cosette out to draw water from the well, she returns to them in the company of Valjean. Valjean tells them of Fantine's death and initially requests to take Cosette with him, but the Thénardiers attempt to con Valjean, falsely claiming they love Cosette as if she was their own daughter, have had to purchase expensive medicine to treat her for frequent illness, and are worried about the treacherous people she may encounter in the outside world ("The Thénardier Waltz of Treachery"). In the end, Valjean offers 1500 francs to take Cosette, and, delighted with the money, the Thénardiers hand her over without question.

Nine years later, they are living in the slums of Paris, having lost their inn. One day, they hatch a plan to rob Valjean, who they have learned is now also living in Paris ("The Robbery"). They disguise themselves as beggars and beg the passing Valjean and Cosette to give them money. With the help of robbers Brujon, Babet, Montparnasse, and Claquesous, they surround Valjean and rip open his shirt, revealing the brand on his chest. Éponine notices the police arriving and warns them, but they are captured by Javert and his constables. Thénardier tells Javert about Valjean and the brand on his chest and that he is the one who Javert should really arrest, and Javert releases them.

The Thénardiers then try to rob Valjean again ("The Attack on Rue Plumet"). Thénardier and his gang of robbers reach the gates of Valjean's house on Rue Plumet, when Éponine intercepts them and tries to force them to leave in order to protect Marius. Thénardier refuses to listen and orders Éponine to leave. Éponine is forced to scream in order to get them to leave. Thénardier threatens her but is forced to run, and he and his gang escape via the sewers. Afterwards, whilst the students plan to build the barricades, the Thénardiers plan to wait underground, in the hope that they will pick up lots of wealth and riches from the dead students after the battle is over ("One Day More").

After the barricade falls, Thénardier is in the Parisian sewers robbing the corpses of the rebels ("Dog Eats Dog"). Here he crosses a man carrying what he believes to be an unknown corpse (actually the unconscious Marius, wounded from the barricades). When the man collapses, Thénardier steals a ring from Marius' body, and then departs upon realizing that the collapsed man is Jean Valjean. The Thénardiers appear at the wedding of Marius and Cosette, posing as the Baron and Baroness de Thénard. Marius sees through their disguise and orders them to leave, but they refuse to do so until they have properly extorted him. They attempt to blackmail Marius with the information that Valjean is a murderer, offering the stolen ring as evidence. Their plan backfires when Marius recognizes the ring as his own, realizing that Valjean must have rescued him after the barricades fell. He hits Thénardier and throws him the rest of his money before leading Cosette away, leaving the Thénardiers to enjoy the feast and gloat over their survival, despite their children's deaths ("Beggars At The Feast"). This was altered in the film adaptation, where the Thénardiers are thrown out of the party after their extortion attempt fails. Along with Javert, they do not appear in the show's finale, presumably due to their villainous roles, as well as the fact that they are among the few characters to survive the entire play.

The Thénardiers are usually played by a high baritone (Thénardier) and a mezzo-soprano (Madame Thénardier). Onstage, Thénardier has been played by many actors including Alun Armstrong, Martin Ball, Gary Beach, Cameron Blakely, Leo Burmester, Ed Dixon, Barry James, Gavin Lee, Matt Lucas, Peter Polycarpou, Stephen Tate, and Chip Zien. Madame Thénardier has been played by many actresses including Victoria Clark, Josefina Gabrielle, Jenny Galloway, Ann Harada, Betsy Joslyn, Bonnie Langford, Marina Prior, Lea Salonga, Keala Settle, and Susan Jane Tanner.

=== Songs ===
In the musical, the Thénardiers appear in the following songs:

Castle on a Cloud (Madame Thénardier only)
A song of Cosette's dreams of heaven, which is quickly interrupted by Madame Thénardier to make her fetch a bucket of water. Known as Mon Prince au Chemin or Une poupée dans la vitrine in the successive French versions.
Master of the House
A song sung by both of the Thénardiers, along with his drunken customers singing how well it is to have power in the pub. Known as La Devise du Cabaretier in the original French version, then as Maître Thénardier in the 1991 version.
The Thénardier Waltz of Treachery
Where the duo repeatedly try to swindle as much money as they can from Valjean in exchange for Cosette. Known as La Valse de la Fourberie then as La Transaction in the various French version.
The Robbery/Javert's Intervention
Thénardier approaches Valjean, asking for donations for the fake child seen in Look Down. Thénardier recognizes Valjean and assaults him before Javert intervenes.
The Attack on Rue Plumet (Thénardier only)
Known simply as Rue Plumet in the original French version, and later as Le casse de la Rue Plumet. Thénardier rounds up his gang as they attempt to rob Valjean's home as he blames his poverty on him. Éponine stops them from doing so and they are forced to retreat.
One Day More
Though small, the two appear every now and then telling how they'll simply hide in the shadows, wait things out, and pick the pockets of the corpses when they're the only ones left. Known as Demain in the original French version and as Le Grand Jour in the 1991 version.
The Sewers/Dog Eats Dog (Thénardier only)
Thénardier sings to himself in the sewers as he fingers through the bodies of the students. One of the show's darkest songs, it is known as Fureurs Cannibales in the 1991 French version.
Beggars at the Feast
The Thénardiers describe how they enjoy sneaking into parties and chatting with the upper crust of society. They gloat about their survival.

== Adaptations ==
Since the original publication of Les Misérables in 1862, the characters of the Thénardiers have been presented in many adaptations of the novel in various media, including books, films, musicals, plays, and games.
