= Songs from Les Misérables =

The songs from Les Misérables are the musical numbers featured in the stage adaptation of Victor Hugo's 1862 novel of the same name. They are performed by the musical’s principal characters and ensemble across the prologue, two acts, and epilogue.

The score includes solos and ensemble pieces, including "I Dreamed a Dream", "On My Own", and "Do You Hear the People Sing?". The songs have appeared in stage productions, cast recordings, and the 2012 film adaptation. Cast recordings include versions by the Original London Cast and the Original Broadway Cast, while the film’s soundtrack reached number one on the American Billboard chart in 2012.

== Performances ==
Several cast recordings of Les Misérables exist, including versions by the Original London Cast and the Original Broadway Cast.

The official motion picture soundtrack from the 2012 film adaptation reached number one on the American Billboard chart in 2012.

=== Characters ===
Key characters:

- Jean Valjean, also known as "Prisoner 24601", is a morally conflicted convict on parole and the protagonist of Les Misérables. Failing to find work with his yellow parole note and redeemed by the Bishop of Digne's mercy, he tears up his passport. He conceals his identity under the alias "Monsieur Madeleine", (later "Monsieur Fauchelevent") to begin a new life. However, the police inspector, Javert, constantly pursues him.
- Bishop Myriel offers Valjean shelter for the night and defends him from the police after Valjean steals from him.
- Fantine is a struggling single mother who, after being fired from her job, becomes a street prostitute to pay for her child Cosette's well-being. She later dies, allowing Jean Valjean to become Cosette's guardian.
- Javert, a police inspector, originally a prison guard, becomes obsessed with apprehending Valjean after he abandons his parole. When he is spared later in the musical by Valjean, he is unable to comprehend why he was shown mercy and throws himself off a building, ending his life.
- Monsieur and Madame Thénardier are a crooked couple who own an inn and exploit their customers financially. They later operate as a band of thieves in Paris.
- Cosette, Fantine's daughter, whom Valjean later adopts, is abused and mistreated by the Thénardiers.
- Marius Pontmercy is a French student and revolutionary who falls in love with Cosette. He is one of two survivors at the barricade, rescued by Jean Valjean, who carries him through the sewers of Paris.
- Éponine is the daughter of the Thénardiers. She transitions from a pampered childhood to a life of hardship in Paris. She harbors an unrequited love for Marius.
- Enjolras is the leader of the student revolutionaries. He seeks to bring revolution and change to France.
- Gavroche is the young son of the Thénardiers who joins the revolutionaries and supports their cause. He is a street urchin who is often interpreted as representing the youthful spirit of the rebellion.
- Grantaire is a revolutionary who doesn't believe in the causes of the revolution. However, he reveres Enjolras. He is often portrayed drunk throughout the musical.

=== Songs ===
Act I

- Overture – Instrumental (Orchestra)
- Prologue: Work Song – Chain Gang, Javert and Valjean
- Prologue: On Parole – Valjean, Farmer, Labourer, Innkeeper's Wife and Innkeeper
- Prologue: Valjean Arrested, Valjean Forgiven – Constables and Bishop
- Prologue: What Have I Done? – Valjean
- At the End of the Day – Fantine, The Poor, Foreman, Workers, Factory Girls and Valjean
- I Dreamed a Dream – Fantine
- Lovely Ladies – Fantine, Sailors, Whores, Old Woman, Crone and Pimp
- Fantine's Arrest – Fantine, Bamatabois, Javert, and Valjean
- The Runaway Cart – Onlookers, Valjean, Fauchelevent, and Javert
- Who Am I? – Valjean
- Fantine's Death – Fantine and Valjean
- The Confrontation – Javert and Valjean
- Castle on a Cloud – Young Cosette and Madame Thénardier
- Master of the House – Thénardier, Madame Thénardier and Chorus
- The Well Scene – Valjean and Young Cosette
- The Bargain / The Thénardier Waltz of Treachery – Thénardier, Valjean, Madame Thénardier and Young Cosette
- Suddenly – Valjean (2012 film only)
- The Convent – Nuns and Valjean (2012 film only)
- Look Down – Beggars, Gavroche, Old Woman, Prostitute, Pimp, Enjolras and Marius
- The Robbery / Javert's Intervention – Thénardier, Madame Thénardier, Éponine, Marius, Valjean and Javert
- Stars – Javert
- Éponine's Errand – Marius and Éponine
- The ABC Café / Red and Black – Students, Enjolras, Marius, Grantaire and Gavroche
- Do You Hear the People Sing? – Enjolras, Grantaire, Students and Beggars
- In My Life – Cosette, Valjean, Marius and Éponine
- A Heart Full of Love – Marius, Cosette and Éponine
- The Attack on Rue Plumet – Thénardier, Thieves, Éponine, Marius, Valjean and Cosette
- One Day More – Valjean, Marius, Cosette, Éponine, Enjolras, Javert, Thénardier, Madame Thénardier and Company

Act II

- Building the Barricade (Upon These Stones) – Enjolras, Javert, Marius, Éponine and Valjean
- On My Own – Éponine
- At the Barricade – Enjolras, Students and Army Officer
- Javert's Arrival – Javert and Enjolras
- Little People – Gavroche, Students, Enjolras, and Javert
- A Little Fall of Rain – Éponine and Marius
- Night of Anguish – Enjolras, Valjean and Students
- The First Attack – Enjolras, Grantaire, Students, Valjean, and Javert
- Drink with Me – Grantaire, Marius and Students
- Bring Him Home – Valjean
- Dawn of Anguish – Enjolras and Students
- The Second Attack (Death of Gavroche) – Enjolras, Marius, Valjean, Grantaire, Gavroche and Students
- The Final Battle – Army Officer, Grantaire, Enjolras, and Students
- The Sewers – Instrumental (Orchestra)
- Dog Eats Dog – Thénardier
- Javert's Suicide – Valjean and Javert
- Turning – Women of Paris
- Empty Chairs at Empty Tables – Marius
- Every Day / A Heart Full of Love (Reprise) – Cosette, Marius and Valjean
- Valjean's Confession – Valjean and Marius
- Suddenly (Reprise) – Marius and Cosette (2012 film only)
- Wedding Chorale – Guests, Thénardier, Marius and Madame Thénardier
- Beggars at the Feast – Thénardier and Madame Thénardier
- Epilogue: Valjean's Death – Valjean, Fantine, Cosette, Marius and Éponine
- Finale: Do You Hear the People Sing (Reprise) – Full Company

== Prologue ==
=== Overture / Work Song ===
The overture "Work Song" features an instrumental introduction that sets the scene in Toulon, France, 1815.

In early versions, such as the Original London Recording, the overture was a simplified version of "At the End of the Day".

French versions

- 1980 Original French Version: This song did not appear, nor did any part of the Prologue. However, its musical theme was adapted from "Look Down", which appeared as Donnez, Donnez.
- 1991 Paris Revival Version: This song is known as Ouverture (Overture) and Le bagne: pitié, pitié (The Prison: Mercy, mercy).

Other Languages

- 2011 "Los Misérables - Más Que un Musical, una Leyenda" (Les Misérables - More Than a Musical, a Legend) - This version is in Spanish, and the song is known as Prólogo.

=== On Parole ===
"On Parole" is the second song in the prologue. Sometimes this is the first half of "Valjean Arrested, Valjean Forgiven", but is more commonly the first part of "The Bishop of Digne". Valjean travels trying to find a place to work and stay. However, he is shunned almost everywhere he goes until the Bishop brings him in and supplies him with food and wine.

French versions

- 1980 Original French Version: This song did not appear, nor did any of the Prologue.
- 1991 Paris Revival Version: This song is known as En liberté conditionnelle (On Parole).

=== Valjean Arrested, Valjean Forgiven ===
The song contains two parts. In the first part, Valjean is invited in by the Bishop and steals his silver. In the second part, Valjean is caught by two constables. The former is often omitted in recordings; but when both parts are played, the song is usually known as "The Bishop of Digne".

French versions

- 1980 Original French Version: This song did not appear, nor did any of the Prologue.
- 1991 Parisian Revival Version: This song is known as L'évêque de Digne (The Bishop of Digne).

=== Valjean's Soliloquy – What Have I Done? ===
"What Have I Done?" is the fourth and final song in the Prologue and is sung by Valjean.

French versions

- 1980 Original French Version: This song did not appear, nor did any of the Prologue.
- 1991 Parisian Revival Version: This song is known as Pourquoi ai-je permis à cet homme? (Why Did I Allow That Man?).

== Act I ==
=== At the End of the Day ===
The music of "At the End of the Day" is intended to be fast and intricate. Different melodies come together, sung by various groups of poor women and men, female workers, and solos by individual workers, all accompanied by a repetition of the title.

French versions

- 1980 Original French Version: This song is known as La journée est finie (The Day is Finished), in which it appears as the first song.
- 1991 Parisian Revival Version: This song is known as Quand un jour est passé (When a Day is Past).

=== I Dreamed a Dream ===
"I Dreamed a Dream" is a solo sung by Fantine during the first act. Most of the song is soft and melancholic but, toward the end, it becomes louder and taut with frustration and anguish. She cries aloud about the wretched state of her life since being abandoned by Cosette's father.

Other uses

Several artists and characters have covered "I Dreamed a Dream" in other contexts.

- Neil Diamond recorded "I Dreamed a Dream" for his 1987 live album Hot August Night II
- The song appears on Aretha Franklin's 1991 album What You See Is What You Sweat. Franklin also performed this song for U.S. President Bill Clinton on the evening of the day that he was inaugurated.
- In the film The Commitments (1991), one of the auditionees for the titular band sings "I Dreamed a Dream" as her audition song.
- Susan Boyle performed the song in 2009 for her audition on the third season of the ITV programme Britain's Got Talent. The song's renewed popularity caused Patti LuPone's 1985 recording to enter the UK Singles Chart, peaking at forty-five with 4,987 digital download sales. "I Dreamed a Dream" is the musical's only charted hit.
- In season one, episode 19 of Glee, characters Rachel Berry (Lea Michele) and Shelby Corcoran (Idina Menzel) sing "I Dreamed a Dream" as a duet in a dream sequence.

French versions

- 1980 Original French Version: This song is known as J'avais rêvé d'une autre vie (I Had Dreamed of Another Life).
- 1991 Parisian Revival Version: This song is known as J'avais rêvé d'une autre vie (I Had Dreamed of Another Life) but had somewhat different lyrics to the original version.

=== Lovely Ladies ===
"Lovely Ladies" is a song from the first act. It is followed by "Fantine's Arrest". Sometimes, the two are counted as one song. Fantine, now unemployed, wanders to the docks where she eventually turns to prostitution to survive.

French versions

- 1980 Original French Version: This song did not appear on the recording but was a part of the stage show as a song known as La nuit (The Night), which depicts similar events as the scene where Fantine sells her hair in Les beaux cheveux que voilà (The Beautiful Hair That is There). A shortened version of this song was added at the end of J'avais rêvé d'une autre vie (I Had Dreamed of Another Life), which contains the same melody as the final and slower section of Lovely Ladies.
- 1991 Parisian Revival Version: This song is known as Tu viens, chéri! (You Come, Darling!).

=== Fantine's Arrest ===
"Fantine's Arrest" is a song from the first act. It follows "Lovely Ladies", though the two are sometimes counted as one song. Fantine expresses her anger toward Valjean when she believes he is against her. She is overwhelmed by emotion when she thinks of her dying daughter and asks God to let her die instead. Valjean's appearance in the song is sometimes referred to as "Valjean's Intervention". This song is followed by "The Runaway Cart".

French versions

- 1980 Original French Version: This song was separated into two songs, which were called Dites-moi ce qui se passe (Tell Me What Happened) and Fantine et Monsieur Madeleine (Fantine and Monsieur Madeleine).
- 1991 Parisian Revival Version: This song was cut from the recording.

=== The Runaway Cart ===
"The Runaway Cart" is a song from the first act, divided into two parts. The chorus, Fauchelevent, and Valjean sing the first, which also has instrumental parts. Valjean and Javert sing the second part on a medium-paced tune. Eventually, the song is sped up by Javert and other policemen (first sung in "Valjean Arrested, Valjean Forgiven"). The song is cut heavily or left completely out in most recordings. It is known in the School Edition as "The Cart Crash". In the 2012 film, the first part of the song follows "At The End of The Day" with the second part following "Fantine's Arrest".

French versions

- 1980 Original French Version: This song did not appear on the recording, but was a part of the stage show in a slightly longer form.
- 1991 Parisian Revival Version: This song was cut from the recording.

=== Who Am I? – The Trial ===
"Who Am I?" is a solo sung by the main character Jean Valjean in the first act. It is slow-paced and shares a melody with Valjean's solo in "One Day More", as well as the ten-years-later sequence after the Prologue. In this song, Jean Valjean must decide whether to sacrifice his new life – in which he's in a powerful position to help others – in order to save the innocent man who is about to serve his sentence.

French versions

- 1980 Original French Version: This song did not appear on the recording, but was a part of the stage show as Comment faire? (What to Do?). It includes an additional stanza, in which Valjean reveals his past, since the concept version did not contain the Prologue.
- 1991 Parisian Revival Version: This song is known as Le procès: comment faire? (The Trial – What to Do?).

=== Fantine's Death ===
"Fantine's Death", also known as "Come to Me", is a song from the first act. It is followed by "The Confrontation". It is slow-paced and the tune is very soft. It has the same melody as "On My Own".

French versions

- 1980 Original French Version: This song appears earlier during the second part of the arrest scene as Fantine et Monsieur Madeleine (Fantine and Monsieur Madeleine) and is slightly shorter. Fantine notably does not die on stage, nor does she see Cosette, but Valjean still asks for forgiveness and pledges to find her daughter.
- 1991 Parisian Revival Version: This song is known as La mort de Fantine (Fantine's Death).

=== The Confrontation ===
The main opposing characters, Jean Valjean and Javert, sing "The Confrontation". It follows "Come to Me" and is followed by "Castle on a Cloud". The song is low and slow-paced. The instrumentation behind the vocals is the same as in "Work Song", the melody partly also picks up that song. The song's highlight is Javert and Valjean singing in counterpoint, with the lead alternating.

French versions

- 1980 Original French Version: this song did not appear. In the stage show, a doctor shortly informed Valjean of Fantine's death and Valjean asked three days to fetch Cosette, which Javert refuses. The music was entirely different, but finished in the same instrumental climax that is still used.
- 1991 Parisian Revival Version: This song is known as La confrontation (The Confrontation).

=== Castle on a Cloud ===
"Castle on a Cloud" is a solo performed by a young Cosette, in which she imagines a place of comfort and care, contrasting with her harsh reality. It is followed by a tag that breaks away from the main melody, involving the first entrance of Madame Thénardier, which is cut from many recordings. Madame Thénardier verbally abuses Cosette, orders her to fetch some water from a well, praises her daughter young Éponine (a silent role), and again refers to Cosette (after Éponine points to Cosette to show she has not left), warning that she never asks twice.

French versions

- 1980 Original French Version: The main song is called Mon prince est en chemin (My Prince is On the Way) where it is preceded by a long instrumental section. The part where Cosette is caught by Madame Thénardier is called Mam'zelle Crapaud (Miss Toad) that is added onto the end of "Castle on a Cloud" in the English version.
- 1991 Parisian Revival Version: This song is known as Une poupée dans la vitrine (A Doll in the Window), being a reference to the book.

=== Master of the House ===
"Master of the House" is one of few songs in the musical containing comedic tones. It introduces the Thénardiers and the way that they corruptly operate their inn. The song is preceded by a lengthy introduction sung largely by regulars at the inn and Thénardier himself, which is cut from almost all recordings.

French versions

- 1980 Original French Version: This song is known as La devise du cabaretier (The Innkeeper's Motto).
- 1991 Parisian Revival Version: This song is known as Maître Thénardier (Master Thénardier).

=== The Well Scene ===
"The Well Scene" is sung by Valjean and Young Cosette. Cosette is walking alone in the woods with a bucket of water. Valjean arrives and Cosette sees him. Valjean tells her to not be afraid. He asks for her name and Cosette tells him. He takes the bucket for her and walks her back to the inn. This scene appears only in the new video production in 2013 and in the Czech version.

=== The Bargain / The Waltz of Treachery ===
"The Bargain" and "The Waltz of Treachery" are two intertwined songs. Much of the number is often cut from recordings. The latter part of "The Waltz of Treachery" is largely instrumental. It flows directly into "Look Down".

French versions

- 1980 Original French Version: This song is known as Valjean chez les Thénardier (Valjean at the Thénardiers') and La valse de la fourberie (The Waltz of Treachery).
- 1991 Parisian Revival Version: This song is known as La transaction (The Dealing). It is only the second part.

=== Suddenly ===
"Suddenly" is a song created for the 2012 film. The song "explains what happens when Valjean takes Cosette from the inn and looks after her". The song appears only on the film and related soundtracks.

=== Look Down ===
"Look Down", sometimes referred to as "Paris: 1832", or, in the School Edition, as "The Beggars", has become a notable theme outside the musical, imitating that which is first heard in the "Work Song". It introduces Gavroche, Enjolras, Marius, the adolescent Éponine, the adolescent Cosette, and the plight of the working poor; it flows directly into "The Robbery". The song comes after "Stars" in the Original London Recording and the 2012 film.

French versions

- 1980 Original French Version: This song is known as Donnez, donnez (Give, Give). The song is about twice as long. It has a second solo sung by Gavroche, where he makes fun of king Louis-Philippe and the politicians. A part of what would later become The Robbery can be found at the end. This stanza asks for some historical knowledge; otherwise, the joke cannot be understood.
- 1991 Parisian Revival Version: This song is known as Bonjour, Paris (Hello, Paris).

=== The Robbery / Javert's Intervention ===
"The Robbery" features Eponine as a young adult and introduces Marius and Cosette are introduced, though Cosette's part in the scene is silent. Marius and Cosette bump into each other and fall in love at first sight. Thénardier attempts to rob Jean Valjean, realizing he is the one who borrowed Cosette, a brawl breaks out. Éponine cries out as Javert arrives on the scene (a segment of the song commonly known as "Javert's Intervention") but, because Javert does not immediately recognise Valjean, the latter escapes. Thénardier then convinces Javert to let him go and pursue Valjean instead.

French versions

- 1980 Original French Version: This song appeared at the end of Donnez, donnez (Give, Give) on the recording, but also existed in the stage show.
- 1991 Parisian Revival Version: This song was cut from the recording.

=== Stars ===
"Stars" is one of the two songs performed as a solo by Javert alongside "Javert's Suicide". In this song, Javert is swearing to God that he will capture Jean Valjean. Javert uses the stars as a metaphor for the order and stability that he had committed his life to. It comes before "Look Down" in the Original London Version and the 2012 film.

French versions

- 1980 Original French Version: This song did not appear.
- 1991 Parisian Revival Version: This song is known as Sous les étoiles (Under the Stars).

=== Éponine's Errand ===
"Éponine's Errand" involves Marius asking Éponine to discover where Cosette lives and then take him to her. Éponine is reluctant to encourage the developing romance between Marius and Cosette, but because of her love for Marius, she cooperates. The first part follows the same melody as L'un vers l'autre (Towards One Another), a solo for Éponine that appeared on the original concept album but did not make it to the current version. This tune appears throughout the musical.

French versions

- 1980 Original French Version: This song did not appear.
- 1991 Parisian Revival Version: This song was cut from the recording.

=== The ABC Café – Red and Black ===
"The ABC Café – Red and Black", on most recordings referred to as simply "Red and Black", introduces the group of young student revolutionaries, who have formed an organization called "The Friends of the ABC". The song name is a mixture from the Café Musain, which was their favourite meeting place in the book and their name, "La Société des Amis de l'ABC" (literally in English, the Society of Friends of the ABC). The name is a pun, as in French "ABC" when pronounced one letter at a time is "abaissé", which is also the word for "lower" (therefore, "Friends of the Lower Class" or "the Poor"). The song consists of many different changing parts. The song involves a tag, in which Gavroche enters and announces to the students that General Lamarque is dead; Enjolras then sings a solo about how this is a sign for the beginning of the revolution, transitioning directly into "Do You Hear the People Sing?"

French versions

- 1980 Original French Version – These songs are known as Rouge et noir (Red and Black), sung by Marius about his meeting with Cosette, followed by Les amis de l'ABC (The Friends of the ABC).
- 1991 Parisian Revival Version – These songs are known as Le café des amis de l'ABC (The Café of the Friends of the ABC) and Rouge la flamme de la colère (Red, the Flame of Anger). The song order is reversed to match the English versions.

=== Do You Hear the People Sing? ===
"Do You Hear the People Sing?" sometimes referred to as "The People's Song" is one of the most frequently performed songs in the musical. It is sung twice: once towards the end of the first act, and again at the end of the musical's Finale. Instrumentally, the theme is also prominent in the battle scenes. In the 2012 movie, it is performed after "One Day More".

At the special Les Misérables 10th Anniversary Concert in 1995, "Do You Hear the People Sing?" was sung as an encore by seventeen different actors who had played Jean Valjean around the world. Each actor sang a line of the song in his own language (except for Jerzy Jeszke, who, although Polish, sang a line in German, having performed the role of Valjean in Germany). The languages sung included French, German, Japanese, Hungarian, Swedish, Polish, Dutch, Norwegian, Czech, Danish, Icelandic and English.

French versions

- 1980 Original French Version – This song is known as À la volonté du peuple (To the Will of the People).
- 1991 Parisian Revival Version – This song is also known as À la volonté du peuple (To the Will of the People), but has slightly different lyrics to the original.

=== Rue Plumet – In My Life ===
"Rue Plumet – In My Life", referred to on most recordings as simply "In My Life", largely involves a duet between Cosette and Valjean, though Marius and Éponine also sing near the end. In the Original London recording alone, it plays alongside a Cosette solo, "I Saw Him Once" (Te souviens-tu du premier jour ? in the original 1980 French production).

French versions

- 1980 Original French Version – This song is known as Cosette: Dans la vie (Cosette: In Life) and Marius: Dans la vie (Marius: In Life).
- 1991 Parisian Revival Version – This song is known as Rue Plumet – Dans ma vie (Rue Plumet – In My Life).

=== A Heart Full of Love ===
"A Heart Full of Love" is sung by Cosette, Marius, and Éponine, immediately following "In My Life".

French versions

- 1980 Original French Version – This song is known as Le cœur au bonheur (The Heart in Happiness). Eponine's part in the song is omitted, making the song slightly shorter. She instead sings the short solo Voilà le Soir Qui Tombe (Here is the Falling Night) immediately prior to this song.
- 1991 Parisian Revival Version – This song is known as Le cœur au bonheur (The Heart in Happiness).

=== The Attack on Rue Plumet ===
"The Attack on Rue Plumet" is a three-part song, the first part of which plays in only two recordings: a long version in the 1980 Original French recording and a much-shortened version only on the Complete Symphonic Recording and added into the beginning of "The Attack on Rue Plumet". The second part is the most frequently performed and appears in all major recordings. The third section serves primarily to advance the plot rather than for musical development. On the London Original Cast recording, it is called the "Plumet Attack". Éponine, bringing Marius to Valjean's house to see Cosette, stumbles upon her father Thénardier and his gang Patron-Minette, made up of Brujon, Babet, Claquesous, and Montparnasse, preparing to rob the house; Éponine screams, dispersing the robbers, while Valjean is led to believe that Javert has discovered his whereabouts, and so prepares to leave at once with Cosette. The large majority of this song's music is not heard anywhere else in the musical.

French versions

- 1980 Original French Version – The first part of the song figures as Voilà le soir qui tombe (Behold, The Night Falls), which lasts over a minute and a half and actually occurs between "In My Life" and "A Heart Full of Love". It is sung solo by Éponine and warns Marius about the planned break-in. The second part did not feature on the recording, but was used as a purely instrumental piece in the stage show.
- 1991 Parisian Revival Version – This song is known as Le casse de la rue Plumet (The Break-In of Rue Plumet).

=== One Day More ===
"One Day More" is a choral piece with many solos: all of the main characters (except for Fantine and The Bishop, both of whom have died by this point) sing in it in a counterpoint style known as dramatic quodlibet, as well as parts by the ensemble. It is the finale to Act 1. The song borrows themes from several songs from the first act.

Each character sings his/her part to a different melody at the same time (counterpoint), before joining for the final chorus:

- Valjean picks up the melody of "Who Am I?" without any changes (A major)
- Marius, Cosette and Éponine sing to the melody of "I Dreamed a Dream" with Éponine taking the bridge ("But the tigers come at night", sung by Éponine as "One more day all on my own") and the other two taking a countermelody that is only instrumental in Fantine's solo. (A major, modulating to F♯ minor)
- Enjolras repeats the bridge melody of "I Dreamed a Dream" with Marius singing the countermelody. (E♭ major)
- Javert sings to the already often-used theme from "Valjean Arrested, Valjean Forgiven", "Fantine's Arrest" and "The Robbery/Javert's Intervention", only slower and in a major key. (A major)
- The Thénardiers sing to a slightly changed melody from "Master of the House" (A major)
- The revolutionaries repeat the bridge melody of "I Dreamed a Dream" with the countermelody. (A major)
- At the end of the song, everyone sings the melody of "Who Am I?" (C major)

Other uses

The song was used by Bill Clinton in his successful 1992 campaign for the presidency of the United States. Another version was used by Barack Obama supporters during his successful 2008 election campaign. It was also used as a finale to the 25th Anniversary concert of Les Misérables at The O2, sung by the OLC with Ramin Karimloo singing the part of Enjolras, Hadley Fraser as Grantaire and Nick Jonas as Marius. Other notable performers from this production include Jamie Muscato as Joly, and Samantha Barks as Éponine.

French versions

- 1980 Original French Version – This song is known as Demain (Tomorrow). It is slightly longer, finishing with a short solo from Valjean.
- 1991 Parisian Revival Version – This song is known as Le grand jour (The Big Day).

== Act II ==
=== Building the Barricade – Upon These Stones ===
"Building the Barricade" is the entr'acte of the musical and contains a new theme, which transitions into Éponine's appearance at the barricade, and her sung dialogue with Marius and later with Valjean as she passes to him a letter from Marius intended for Cosette. It is often cut out of recordings in part or completely. On the Complete Symphonic Recording, this song is mislabeled "At the Barricade".

French versions

- 1980 Original French Version – This song did not appear on the recording, but was present in the stage show.
- 1991 Parisian Revival Version – This song is known as La première barricade (The First Barricade). The section where Éponine delivers the letter to Valjean is cut.

=== On My Own ===
"On My Own" is a solo sung by Éponine. She expresses her unrequited love for, Marius, and how she dreams of being at his side, but knows he is in love with Cosette and not her. The refrain of the song is the same tune as that of "Fantine's Death (Come to Me)", although it adds a bridge and the tune of the verses are different. Beginning in the key of D, modulating to B♭ (even though the song does not actually change key), then ending in F, this is her most important song. In the film adaptation, the song comes after "The Attack on Rue Plumet" and before "One Day More".

Other uses

"On My Own" has appeared in media outside of Les Misérables, for example:

- The character of Rachel Berry in Glee, played by Lea Michele (who played Eponine at the Hollywood Bowl production of Les Misérables), sang this song as an audition to join the Glee Club in the pilot episode. Michele's version has been released as a digital download single.
- Anne Hathaway parodied the song at the 83rd Academy Awards. (Hathaway would later go on to play Fantine in the 2012 film version of Les Misérables.)

French versions

- 1980 Original French Version – This song did not appear, although the music was adapted from L'air de la misère (The Air of Misery), which was sung by Fantine about her misery and suffering. Éponine's solo was known as L'un vers l'autre (The One Toward the Other), bearing no resemblance.
- 1991 Parisian Revival Version – This song is known as Mon histoire (My Story).

=== At the Barricade ===
"At the Barricade", also called "Back at the Barricade", begins with an instrumental reprise of the "Red and Black" and a sung reprise of the "Upon These Stones" musical themes. It is also the first of the two times that a National Guardsmen sings a warning to the revolutionaries. On the Complete Symphonic Recording, this song is mislabeled "Building the Barricade".

French versions

- 1980 Original French Version – This song did not appear.
- 1991 Parisian Revival Version – This song is known as Sur la barricade (On the Barricade).

=== Javert's Arrival ===
"Javert's Arrival", also known as "Javert at the Barricade" or "Javert's Return", involves Javert's return to the barricade to report on the enemy's plans; however, he is interrupted by Gavroche.

French versions

- 1980 Original French Version – This song was a part of the stage show in similar form, but was not a part of the recording.
- 1991 Parisian Revival Version – This song is known as Je sais ce qui se trame (I Know What is Happening).

=== Little People ===
"Little People" begins as Gavroche proudly and merrily uncovers Javert's identity as an undercover police inspector. Most of the song is omitted in the 2012 film, only sung at "The Second Attack".

Versions The Original London Recording included a much longer version sung by Gavroche in the first act, between "Look Down" and "Red and Black". This original version was related to Gavroche being able to be useful even though small, rather than the uncovering of Javert. For later versions of the musical, the song was halved to its current length. Gavroche's gleeful uncovering of Javert is sung to an entirely different melody, already used in the Original French Version and is much shorter, before leading to the musical bit that was left in.

French versions

- 1980 Original French Version – This song is known as La faute à Voltaire (Voltaire's Fault) and is accompanied by a background choir. The chorus was taken directly from the novel.
- 1991 Parisian Revival Version – This song is known as C'est la faute à... (It Is the Fault of...).

=== A Little Fall of Rain ===
"A Little Fall of Rain" is the song of Éponine's death. Éponine, the eldest daughter of the Thénardiers, tells Marius that she loves him, and dies in his arms. Marius's reaction to her death in the musical is quite different from that in the book. In the book, Marius does not really care much about Éponine until she dies, although he is still polite to her. However, in the musical, they are shown as best friends, and he and his fellow students mourn her death. Marius is depicted as devastated and heartbroken by his best friend's death, crying while holding her in his arms, refusing to let go when his fellow students try to take her body away, and refusing the comfort of Enjolras (some versions have him try to follow her, but Enjolras holds him back).

French versions

- 1980 Original French Version – This song is known as Ce n'est rien (It is Nothing).
- 1991 Parisian Revival Version – This song is known as Un peu de sang qui pleure (A Little Blood that Weeps).

=== Night of Anguish ===
"Night of Anguish" is a musical interlude scene. The exact definition of this song and the following are hazy. Sometimes, the few lines following Éponine's death are named "Night of Anguish", it is the scene directly after the first attack that includes the dialogue between Valjean and Javert, that receives this name. In the 2012 film, this song following Eponine's death is omitted and replaced with a non-vocal musical interlude.

French versions

- 1980 Original French Version – This song is known as La nuit de l'angoisse (The Night of Anguish), which contains much of the same musical material, appears much earlier on the concept recording, and is about the revolutionaries' lamentation of their predicament. It also includes material that would later be used in "Drink with Me".
- 1991 Parisian Revival Version – This song was cut from the recording.

=== The First Attack ===
"The First Attack" begins as a largely instrumental number with only some short lines of singing; there are also several lines shouted by revolutionaries during the attack. Depending on the definition of the song, it includes the scene in which Valjean sets Javert free. It does feature in the 2012 film, but the eponymous first attack in it happens just before Eponine's death, with Valjean helping with snipers instead.

French versions

- 1980 Original French Version – This song is known as L'aube du 6 juin (Dawn of June 6) on the recording, but was revised for the stage show into musical sections still present in the English version.
- 1991 Parisian Revival Version – This song is known as La première attaque (The First Attack).

=== Drink with Me ===
"Drink with Me" is the revolutionaries' mellow song as night falls and they await their enemy's inevitable retaliation. Enjolras tells everyone else to stay awake, but he tells Marius to get some sleep, knowing he is still much too devastated over losing Éponine to stay awake. In the 2012 film, the first half of the song is omitted, excluding the revolutionaries' reminiscence and Grantaire's doubts that his comrades are ready for failure, though the verse with the latter was recorded.

French versions

- 1980 Original French Version – One stanza of it can be found in the song La nuit de l'angoisse (The Night of Anguish).
- 1991 Parisian Revival Version – This song is known as Souviens-toi des jours passés (Remember the Past Days).

=== Bring Him Home ===
Valjean prays for Marius's safety and expresses willingness to risk his life for him. In a documentary on the Blu-ray of the film adaptation, Claude-Michel Schönberg revealed that the song was written specifically for Colm Wilkinson. English puppeeteer, actress and singer Louise Gold sang Bring Him Home for Jim Henson's memorial service on May 21, 1990. Josh Groban also covered the song on his Stages album, and so did Barry Manilow on his album Showstoppers. Vocalist Shulem Lemmer sang a cover of the song and sang an updated version changing the lyrics to "Bring Them Home" at an event of solidarity in November 2023 for the still missing October 7th hostages in the United Kingdom.

French versions

- 1980 Original French Version – This song did not appear.
- 1991 Parisian Revival Version – This song is known as Comme un homme (Like a Man).
- 1999 Spanish Cathedral Version - This song is known as Sálvalo (Save him).

=== Dawn of Anguish ===
"Dawn of Anguish" is another minor interlude in which Enjolras and the revolutionaries realize that the people of Paris are not joining their revolution. Without the masses rising up to support them, they accept that the uprising's failure is inevitable and so Enjolras tells all the women and fathers of children to return to their homes, since they will only die if they remain at the barricades. He and the students remain to continue the fight.

French versions

- 1980 Original French Version – This song did not appear.
- 1991 Parisian Revival Version – This song was cut from the recording.
- 1999 Spanish Cathedral Version - This song never appeared and was never mentioned.

=== The Second Attack ===
"The Second Attack" or "Death of Gavroche" features Gavroche running into the enemy line of fire to retrieve ammunition for the revolutionaries, only to be killed during a reprise of his "Little People" solo.

James Fenton had written another song for Gavroche's death, called "Ten Little Bullets", using the melody of Gavroche's solo in "Look Down". The song did not make it past recordings, probably not even there. Only the Broadway Revival version restarted using it in 2006.

French versions

- 1980 Original French Version – This song is known as La mort de Gavroche (The Death of Gavroche).
- 1991 Parisian Revival Version – This song was cut from the recording.

=== The Final Battle ===
"The Final Battle" is a mostly instrumental number, often omitted from recordings. It repeats the first bar of the theme from "Do You Hear the People Sing?" with some variations and key changes, before erupting into a final reprise of the "Red and Black" theme, ending on a discordant chord instead of the major chord of that theme. It is the final scene at the barricade, in which the revolutionaries know they are going to die - "Let others rise to take our place until the earth is free" - in the face of death, the revolutionaries have an undying desire for freedom. The song concludes with the revolutionaries being killed.

French versions

- 1980 Original French Version – This song did not appear.
- 1991 Parisian Revival Version – This song was cut from the recording.

=== The Sewers / Dog Eats Dog ===
"The Sewers" is a lengthy, completely instrumental reprise of "Bring Him Home", though it also incorporates "Dog Eats Dog", a solo performed by Thénardier. In it, Thénardier describes his robbing the dead bodies from the battle at the barricades and justifies his actions by saying that somebody has to "clean them up...as a service to the town". He also declares that God is dead and that the only thing looking down from the heavens is the "harvest moon".

The song was absent in the 2012 film adaptation, which instead contained a shorter chase-action sequence, scored primarily to "Look Down", in its place. Although the song itself is absent, Thénardier is still shown in the sewers robbing dead bodies.

French versions'

- 1980 Original French Version – This song did not appear.
- 1991 Parisian Revival Version – This song is known as Fureurs cannibales (Cannibal Frenzy).

=== Javert's Suicide ===
"Javert's Suicide" is the second and last chief song performed solely by Javert. It is preceded by a repeat of the beginning of "The Confrontation" theme (which is sometimes cut from recordings or incorporated into "The Sewers"), in which Valjean asks Javert for one hour to bring Marius to a hospital, a request to which Javert, this time, agrees. After Valjean leaves, Javert contemplates the paradox of hunting the man who has spared him his life; he proceeds to jump to his death in the river. The song is instrumentally an exact reprise of Valjean's Soliloquy, though sung by Javert with changed lyrics. Part of an instrumental from Stars is heard at the end of song as he is falling.

French versions

- 1980 Original French Version – This song is known as Noir ou blanc (Black or White).
- 1991 Parisian Revival Version – This song is known as Le suicide de Javert (Javert's Suicide).

=== Turning ===
In "Turning", the women of Paris mourn the loss of the students and their own hopeless cycles of childbirth and misery. It is set to the melody of "Lovely Ladies". It is also the only song in the musical not sung by a major character.

French versions

- 1980 Original French Version – This song did not appear.
- 1991 Parisian Revival Version – This song is known as Tourne, tourne (Turn, Turn).

=== Empty Chairs at Empty Tables ===
"Empty Chairs at Empty Tables" is a solo sung by the character Marius, who is mourning the death of all of his friends who were killed at the barricade. Part of it is to the tune of "The Bishop of Digne".

French versions

- 1980 Original French Version – This song did not appear.
- 1991 Parisian Revival Version – This song is known as Seul devant ces tables vides (Alone in Front of These Empty Tables).

=== Every Day ===
"Every Day" or "Marius and Cosette" is a two-part song sung by Cosette, Marius and Valjean. The second part is often known as "A Heart Full of Love (Reprise)". The 2012 film only used the second part.

French versions

- 1980 Original French Version – This song did not appear, but identical music sections were present in a former exchange between Marius and the Gillenormands in the stage show.
- 1991 Parisian Revival Version – This song was cut from the recording.

=== Valjean's Confession ===
"Valjean's Confession" is sung by Valjean and Marius. Valjean tells Marius of his own past, adding that Cosette must not find out.

French versions

- 1980 Original French Version – This song is known as L'aveu de Jean Valjean (Jean Valjean's Confession) and was much longer. It explains Valjean's motives more clearly. When Marius asks why Valjean confesses to him, Valjean explains that his conscience will not let him rest until he has done so. Valjean asks Marius if it would be better if he (Valjean) did not see Cosette again and Marius says that he thinks so.
- 1991 Parisian Revival Version – This song was cut from the recording.

=== The Wedding ===
"The Wedding" is a very brief song, also known as the "Wedding Chorale", and is sung by the guests on Cosette and Marius's wedding. The second part is a dialogue-heavy song that is often abridged or cut, sung by Marius and the Thénardiers. This part is sometimes called "The Waltz of Treachery (Reprise)" as it is sung to a similar melody.

French versions

- 1980 Original French Version – The first part of this song is known as Le mariage: soyez heureux (The Marriage: Be Happy). It was longer than all other versions, featuring an additional refrain. The second part is known as Marchandage et révélation (Bargaining and Revelation), where it is more than only slightly longer. It included another subplot from the book. Here, Thénardier first tries to shock Marius with the revelation that Valjean is an ex-convict, which Marius already knows. When Thénardier says that Valjean is also a murderer, Marius claims to know that as well. He believes Valjean to have killed both Javert (on the barricade) and a certain M. Madeleine, a rich factory owner. Thénardier proves to him (with the help of newspaper clippings), that Javert committed suicide and that Madeleine and Valjean are the same person – Marius's false source of information is unknown – and then tells him about the sewers.
- 1991 Parisian Revival Version – This song is known as Sonnez, sonnez (Ring, Ring).

=== Beggars at the Feast ===
"Beggars at the Feast" is the second big musical number sung by the Thénardiers, in which they proclaim how through their treacherous ways they often depicted as managing to benefit regardless of the situation before waving the audience goodbye with the mocking line "When we're rich as Croesus, Jesus, won't we see you all in hell". It is a reprise of the "Master of the House" theme.

French versions'

- 1980 Original French Version – This song did not appear.
- 1991 Parisian Revival Version – This song is known as Mendiants à la fête (Beggars at the Party).

== Epilogue ==
=== Valjean's Death ===
"Valjean's Death" is the penultimate (or last, depending on the song organization) musical number in Les Misérables. This and the "Finale", into which it flows without pause, are sometimes counted as one song. The combination is often known as "The Epilogue" (as the musical also has a Prologue). Fantine and Éponine come to welcome him into salvation. "Valjean's Death" borrows the tune from "Fantine's Death" and "On My Own", and towards the end, "Bring Him Home". In the 2012 film, it comes straight after "Beggars at the Feast"

French versions

- 1980 Original French Version – This song is known as Épilogue: la lumière (Epilogue: The Light). Fantine and Eponine do not appear, as the song ends alternatively with Valjean imploring Cosette and Marius to love and cherish each other, before he peacefully passes away.
- 1991 Parisian Revival Version – This song is known as Final: c'est pour demain (Finale: It is For Tomorrow).

=== Finale ===
"The Finale", also known as "Do You Hear the People Sing? (Reprise)", is the last song in the musical; it is often incorporated with "Valjean's Death" into a single track on recordings, simply entitled "Epilogue".

French versions

- 1980 Original French Version – This song did not appear, instead ending with "Valjean's Death".
- 1991 Parisian Revival Version – This song is known as Final: c'est pour demain "(Finale: It is For Tomorrow)".

== Song appearances in recordings ==
Key

- Yes – All or almost all of song included
- – Part of song included
- No – Song excluded

Song	Original French concept album (1980)	Original London recording (1985)	Original Broadway recording (1987)	Complete symphonic recording (1988)	Paris revival recording (1991)	10th anniversary concert recording (1995)	School edition^{[a]}(2002)	25th anniversary recording (2010)	Motion picture soundtrack (2012)^{[d]}	Staged concert recording (2019)	40th anniversary recording (2025)
Overture / Work Song	No	Yes	Yes	Yes	Yes	Yes	Partially	Yes	Partially	Yes	Yes
On Parole	No	No	No	Yes	No	Partially	Partially	Yes	Partially	Yes	Yes
Valjean Arrested, Valjean Forgiven	No	Partially	Partially	Yes	Partially	Yes	Partially	Yes	Partially	Yes	Yes
Valjean's Soliloquy (What Have I Done?)	No	Yes	Yes	Yes	Yes	Yes	Partially	Yes	Yes	Yes	Yes
At the End of the Day	Yes	Yes	Yes	Yes	Yes	Yes	Yes	Yes	Yes	Yes	Yes
I Dreamed a Dream	Yes	Yes	Yes	Yes	Yes	Yes	Yes	Yes	Yes	Yes	Yes
Lovely Ladies	Partially	Yes	Yes	Yes	Yes	Partially	Partially	Yes	Partially	Yes	Yes
Fantine's Arrest	Yes	No	No	Yes	No	Yes	Partially	Yes	Partially	Yes	Yes
The Runaway Cart	No	No	No	Yes	No	Partially	Partially	Yes	Partially	Partially	Yes
Who Am I?	No	Yes	Yes	Yes	Yes	Yes	Yes	Yes	Yes	Yes	Yes
Come to Me (Fantine's Death)	No	Yes	Yes	Yes	Yes	Yes	Yes	Partially	Partially	Partially	Partially
The Confrontation	No	Yes	Yes	Yes	Yes	Yes	Partially	Yes	Partially	Yes	Yes
Castle on a Cloud	Yes	Partially	Partially	Yes	Partially	Partially	Partially	Yes	Partially	Yes	Yes
Master of the House	Partially	Partially	Partially	Yes	Partially	Partially	Partially	Partially	Partially	Partially	Partially
The Well Scene	No	No	No	No	No	No	No	No	Yes	No	Yes
The Bargain	Yes	No	No	Yes	No	Partially	Partially	Yes	Partially	Yes	Yes
The Waltz of Treachery	Yes	Yes	Yes	Yes	Yes	Yes	Yes	Yes	Partially	Yes	Yes
Suddenly	No	No	No	No	No	No	No	No	Yes	No	No
The Convent	No	No	No	No	No	No	No	No	Yes	No	No
Look Down	Yes	Partially	Partially	Yes	Yes	Partially	Partially	Yes	Partially	Yes	Yes
The Robbery	Partially	No	No	Yes	No	No	Partially	Yes	Partially	Yes	Yes
Javert's Intervention	No	No	No	Yes	No	No	Yes	Yes	Partially	Yes	Yes
Little People (original)	Yes	Yes	No	No	No	Partially	Partially	Partially	No	No	Partially
Stars	No	Yes	Yes	Yes	Yes	Yes	Partially	Yes	Yes	Yes	Yes
Éponine's Errand	No	No	No	Yes	No	No	Yes	No	Partially	No	Yes
The ABC Café / Red and Black	Partially	Partially	Partially	Yes	Partially	Yes	Partially	Yes	Partially	Yes	Yes
Do You Hear the People Sing?	Yes	Yes	Yes	Yes	Yes	Yes	Yes	Yes	Yes	Yes	Yes
I Saw Him Once	No	Yes	No	No	No	No	No	No	No	No	No
In My Life	Partially	Partially	Yes	Yes	Yes	Partially	Partially	Yes	Yes	Yes	Yes
A Heart Full of Love	Partially	Partially	Yes	Yes	Yes	Yes	Yes	Yes	Partially	Yes	Yes
The Attack on Rue Plumet	Partially	Partially	Partially	Yes	Partially	Partially	Partially	Yes	Partially	Yes	Yes
One Day More	Yes	Yes	Yes	Yes	Yes	Yes	Yes	Yes	Yes	Yes	Yes
Building the Barricade (Upon These Stones)	No	No	Partially	Yes	Partially	No	Partially	Yes	Partially	Yes	Yes
On My Own	Yes	Yes	Yes	Yes	Yes	Yes	Yes	Yes	Partially	Yes	Yes
At the Barricade	No	Partially	Yes	Yes	Yes	Yes	Partially	Yes	Partially	Yes	Yes
Javert's Arrival	No	No	Yes	Yes	Yes	Yes	Partially	Yes	Yes	Yes	Yes
Little People	No	No	Partially	Yes	Partially	Yes	Partially	Yes	Partially	Yes	Yes
A Little Fall of Rain	Yes	Yes	Yes	Yes	Yes	Yes	Partially	Yes	Partially	Yes	Yes
Night of Anguish	Yes	No	No	Yes	No	Yes	Partially	Yes	Yes	Yes	Yes
The First Attack	Partially	No	Partially	Yes	Partially	Yes	Partially	Yes	Partially	Yes	Yes
Drink with Me	Yes	Yes	Yes	Yes	Yes	Yes	Yes	Yes	Partially	Yes	Yes
Bring Him Home	No	Yes	Yes	Yes	Yes	Yes	Yes	Yes	Yes	Yes	Yes
Dawn of Anguish	No	No	No	Yes	No	No	Partially	Partially	Partially	No	Partially
The Second Attack (Death of Gavroche)	Yes	No	No	Yes	No	No	^{[b]}	Yes	Partially	Yes	Yes
The Final Battle	No	No	No	Yes	No	Yes	Yes	Yes	Yes	Yes	Yes
The Sewers	No	No	No	Yes	No	Yes	Yes	Yes	Partially	Yes	Yes
Dog Eats Dog	No	Yes	Yes	Yes	Yes	Yes	Partially	Yes	No	Yes	Yes
Javert's Suicide	Partially	Partially	Partially	Yes	Yes	Yes	Yes	Yes	Partially	Yes	Yes
Turning	No	Yes	Yes	Yes	Yes	Yes	Partially	Yes	Partially	Yes	Yes
Empty Chairs at Empty Tables	No	Yes	Yes	Yes	Yes	Yes	Yes	Yes	Yes	Yes	Yes
Every Day	No	No	No	Yes	No	Yes	Yes	Yes	Partially	Yes	Yes
Valjean's Confession	Yes	No	No	Yes	No	No	Yes	Yes	Partially	Yes	Yes
Suddenly (Reprise)	No	No	No	No	No	No	No	No	Yes	No	No
The Wedding Chorale	Yes	Partially	Partially	Yes	Partially	Partially	No ^{[c]}	Yes	Partially	Yes	Yes
Beggars at the Feast	No	Yes	Yes	Yes	Yes	Partially	Partially	Yes	Partially	Yes	Yes
Valjean's Death	Partially	Partially	Partially	Yes	Partially	Yes	Partially	Yes	Yes	Yes	Yes
Finale	No	Yes	Yes	Yes	Yes	Yes	Yes	Yes	Yes	Yes	Yes

Notes

- ^{a} While the cuts in the School Edition appear significant, most are small edits that do not remove more than a verse or a few measures.
- ^{b} While "The Death of Gavroche" is included in the School edition, it was cut from the 25th Anniversary.
- ^{c} While "The Wedding Chorale" was cut in the School edition, it appeared in the 25th Anniversary Concert.
- ^{d} Only some of the songs listed below were included on the motion picture's soundtrack album. See the track listing at Les Misérables: Highlights from the Motion Picture Soundtrack. More tracks are present in the deluxe version of the album.

== See also ==
- Adaptations of Les Misérables
