= Les Misérables (British TV series) =

2018 BBC TV series

- Based on: Les Misérables by Victor Hugo
- Written by: Andrew Davies
- Directed by: Tom Shankland
- Starring: Dominic West; David Oyelowo; Lily Collins; Adeel Akhtar; Johnny Flynn; Henry Lloyd-Hughes; David Bradley; Derek Jacobi; Ron Cook; Alan David; Kathryn Hunter; Olivia Colman; Enzo Cilenti; Josh O'Connor; Ellie Bamber; Erin Kellyman; Joseph Quinn; Donald Sumpter; Turlough Convery; Archie Madekwe
- Composer: John Murphy
- Country of origin: United Kingdom
- No. of series: 1
- No. of episodes: 6

Production
- Executive producers: Andrew Davies; Faith Penhale; Bethan Jones; Mona Qureshi; Rebecca Eaton; Dominic West; David Oyelowo
- Producer: Chris Carey
- Running time: 60 minutes
- Production companies: BBC Studios; WGBH Boston; Lookout Point; CZAR TV

Original release
- Network: BBC One
- Release: 30 December 2018 – 3 February 2019

Les Misérables is a British television series based on the 1862 French historical novel of the same name by Victor Hugo. Adapted by Andrew Davies and directed by Tom Shankland, it stars Dominic West, David Oyelowo, and Lily Collins.

The series was produced by the BBC with support from PBS member station WGBH Boston's Masterpiece series. BBC Studios handles the distribution for the series. It was broadcast in the United Kingdom between 30 December 2018 and 3 February 2019.

== Cast ==
- Dominic West as Jean Valjean
- David Oyelowo as Javert
- Lily Collins as Fantine Thibault
- Adeel Akhtar as Monsieur Thénardier
- Johnny Flynn as Felix Tholomyès
- Henry Lloyd-Hughes as Col. Pontmercy
- David Bradley as Monsieur Gillenormand
- Derek Jacobi as Bishop Myriel
- Ron Cook as Hair and Teeth Dealer
- Alan David as the Scribe
- Kathryn Hunter as Madame Victurnien
- Olivia Colman as Madame Rosalie Thénardier
- Enzo Cilenti as Rivette
- Josh O'Connor as Marius Pontmercy
  - Raphael Bishop and Woody Norman as young Marius
- Ellie Bamber as Cosette
  - Mailow Defoy and Lia Giovanelli as young Cosette
- Erin Kellyman as Éponine Thénardier
  - Sienna Barnes and Tiarna Williams as young Eponine
- Joseph Quinn as Enjolras
- Donald Sumpter as Monsieur Mabeuf
- Turlough Convery as Grantaire
- Archie Madekwe as Courfeyrac
- Alex Jarrett as Azelma Thénardier
  - Amani Johnson and Isabelle Lewis as young Azelma
- Reece Yates as Gavroche
  - Emmanuel Goffin as young Gavroche
- Emma Fielding as Nicolette
- Charlotte Dylan as Favourite
- Ayoola Smart as Zéphine
- Hayley Carmichael as Madame Magloire
- Liz Carr as Fantine's Concierge
- Ashley Artus as Gendarme
- Matthew Steer as Blachevelle
- Lorcan Cranitch as Chief Inspector
- Georgie Glen as Abbess
- Anna Calder-Marshall as Madame Rully
- Natalie Simpson as Sister Simplice
- Angela Wynter as Toussaint
- Lily Newmark as Sophie

== Episodes ==
| No. | Episode | Directed by | Written by | Original release date | UK viewers (millions) |
|---|---|---|---|---|---|
| 1 | Episode 1 | Tom Shankland | Andrew Davies | 30 December 2018 | 5.95 |
Following the Battle of Waterloo, the robber Monsieur Thénardier tries to loot the possessions of fallen soldiers but ends up rescuing a French officer. The young Marius Pontmercy is raised by his conservative, monarchist grandfather Monsieur Gillenormand, who bars his estranged son-in-law Colonel Georges Pontmercy from having anything to do with his son. Serving a 19-year prison sentence for stealing a loaf of bread, Jean Valjean endures hard labour and the frequent abuse of the prison guards, particularly the legalistic Javert. After being released, Valjean is ostracised by much of society due to his criminal status. The kindly Bishop Myriel takes pity on Valjean, giving him shelter and saving him from the police after he steals a basket of silver knives and forks. Later, Valjean robs a coin from a twelve-year-old boy named Petit Gervais. Experiencing remorse, he tries to return the coin but the boy has fled. Elsewhere, Fantine falls in love with Félix Tholomyès, but he abandons her to return to his family, leaving Fantine and their baby daughter Cosette.
| 2 | Episode 2 | Tom Shankland | Andrew Davies | 6 January 2019 | N/A (<5.63) (Note: Not reported in the weekly top 15 programmes for four-screen viewer ratings.) |
Six years later, Valjean has become a wealthy factory owner and the Mayor of Montreuil-sur-Mer. Adopting the name Monsieur Madeleine, he has a tense relationship with the new chief of police, Javert, who suspects that the Mayor is Valjean after he strongly lifts a carriage wheel from a man. Fantine leaves her young daughter in the care of the Thénardiers, who exploit Cosette as a servant at their hotel and bar. Fantine finds work at Valjean's factory but is fired by Valjean for concealing information about her illegitimate child. Forced into prostitution, Fantine sells her long hair and two front teeth to pay board for Cosette. After Fantine fights back against an abusive customer and injures him, Valjean saves her from being imprisoned and pays for her treatment at the infirmary. Javert later apologises to Monsieur Madeleine after receiving news that a man identified as Valjean is facing trial for robbing Petit Gervais. Valjean promises to reunite Fantine with her daughter. An older Marius Pontmercy, who is growing disillusioned with his grandfather's contempt for the poor, reunites with his dying father at his deathbed.
| 3 | Episode 3 | Tom Shankland | Andrew Davies | 13 January 2019 | 5.29 |
Valjean travels to Arras where he saves Champmathieu from being imprisoned for life by identifying himself as Valjean. Valjean is sent back to the hulk but not before spending a tender moment with a broken-hearted Fantine. After two years of his life sentence, Valjean escapes, following a drowning accident. Honoring his promise to Fantine, he buys Cosette's freedom for 1,500 Francs. Seeking more money, Monsieur Thénardier tries to recover Cosette but is defeated by Valjean. The Thénardiers' fortunes take a turn for the worse when Javert discovers they have sold Cosette and arranges for their creditors to repossess their hotel. Valjean and Cosette escape to Paris where they start a new life. A female tenant recognizes Valjean and reports him to Javert. Following a pursuit, Valjean and Cosette gain sanctuary from the nuns of the Petit-Picpus convent. The nuns agree to educate Cosette and hide Valjean from Javert.
| 4 | Episode 4 | Tom Shankland | Andrew Davies | 20 January 2019 | 5.34 |
Eight years later, Cosette has grown into a beautiful young woman. After leaving the Petit-Picpus convent, Valjean has become a wealthy philanthropist who helps the poor. Marius has become estranged from his grandfather, due to his liberal and anti-monarchist views and moves into an apartment building. His neighbours are the Thénardiers, who now live in poverty and have resorted to crime. Cosette becomes enamored with Marius after encountering him in Paris' Luxembourg Garden. Haunted by the tragic life of Cosette's mother Fantine, Valjean forbids Cosette from having a relationship with any young man. Éponine grows disillusioned with her father's criminal activities and fraternizes with Marius. The Thénardiers soon discover that Valjean is living in Paris and plot revenge. Marius overhears their plot and informs Javert, who outfits him with two pistols. The Thénardiers and their accomplices lure Valjean into a trap but he is able to fight them off. Marius alerts the police, who arrest the Thénardiers and their accomplices. Valjean is wounded but escapes. Marius learns that Monsieur Thénardier was the man who saved his father at Waterloo, placing him in a dilemma.
| 5 | Episode 5 | Tom Shankland | Andrew Davies | 27 January 2019 | 5.15 |
Éponine and Azelma are released but Madame Thénardier is imprisoned. Cosette continues her secret relationship with Marius, who is besotted with her. Marius seeks his grandfather's approval for marrying Cosette but storms out after Monsieur Gillenormand makes disparaging remarks about his lover. Fearing for Cosette's safety, Valjean makes preparations to move to England. Monsieur Thénardier escapes and attempts to invade Valjean's house but is foiled by Éponine. Following the attempted break-in, Valjean and Cosette move to another house. The Friends of the ABC launch a revolution, the June Rebellion of 1832 against the Orléanist monarchy, setting up street barricades. During the uprising, Javert is captured by the Republicans. Believing Cosette to be lost, a distraught Marius joins the Republican uprising and helps halt an offensive by government troops. Éponine sacrifices her life to save Marius and provides Cosette's letter. After discovering Cosette's secret relationship with Marius, Valjean resolves to confront him.
| 6 | Episode 6 | Tom Shankland | Andrew Davies | 3 February 2019 | 5.47 |
The French Army storms the barricades, killing many revolutionaries. Valjean confronts Javert but spares his life and allows him to escape. Knowing of Cosette's love for Marius, Valjean carries the wounded Marius through the sewers of Paris. Thénardier permits Valjean and Marius to exit the sewers in return for a fee. Valjean and the unconscious Marius are detained by Javert and his men. After returning Marius to his grandfather, Javert decides not to arrest Valjean. After proposing reforms to the treatment of prisoners, Javert throws himself into the Seine, unable to reconcile showing Valjean clemency and upholding the law. With the approval of Valjean and Gillernomand, Marius and Cosette marry. Right before their marriage, Valjean confesses to Marius that he was a thief in the past and will disappear from their lives after the wedding. Marius doesn't realize that Valjean was the one who earlier saved his life. After coming back from their honeymoon, a vengeful Thénardier approaches Marius and Cosette and threatens to tell everyone that Valjean had killed a young man in the sewers. Marius sees through his lies and finally realizes that Valjean saved his life during the uprising. He and Cosette find a dying Valjean in a rural hamlet where Cosette spends time with her adoptive father on his deathbed.

== Production ==
=== Development ===
The Weinstein Company was initially set to co-produce the series and serve as its distributor in the U.S. and China. The studio was dropped following the Harvey Weinstein sexual abuse allegations. PBS member station WGBH Boston, through their television series Masterpiece, replaced The Weinstein Company as a co-producer of the series.

=== Filming ===
Filming for the series began in February 2018 in Belgium and Northern France.

== Release ==
BBC Studios handles distribution for the series. The drama, which consists of six episodes, premiered on 30 December 2018. In New Zealand, the series was released on TVNZ 1 and its free streaming service TVNZ OnDemand.

In the US, the series was aired on PBS, starting 21 April 2019, to end on 19 May 2019. In Canada, the series started broadcasting on 10 January 2021 on CBC and CBC Gem.

== Reception ==
On the review aggregator website Rotten Tomatoes, 88% of 40 critics' reviews are positive, with an average rating of 7.5/10. The website's consensus reads: "Andrew Davies' deft adaptation of the oft-retold Victor Hugo classic affords viewers a newfound intimacy with these outcasts and revolutionaries, who are ably brought to life by a star-studded cast." Metacritic, which uses a weighted average, assigned the series a score of 79 out of 100, based on 11 critics, indicating "generally favorable reviews".

Collins' performance as Fantine received praise from critics. Alexandra Pollard of The Independent praised her performance, writing "she plays the tragic Fantine with steeliness and grace", and described it as "magnificent." West's performance as Valjean in the final episode also received critical praise. Gabriel Tate of The Telegraph praised his performance, writing "Dominic West steals the show in a stirring finale."

The television mini-series on PBS was described as "an engrossing treat, featuring a vibrant cast and taking its time to unspool the melodrama and offer loving looks at 19th century France." It "hews closely to the source material without skipping too much plot or character motivations", the source material being the 19th century novel by Victor Hugo. The casting is commended, with many strong performances. The plot cannot carry all the detail of Hugo's novel of his characters in a tumultuous time in France, but "when all the cannons are fired and last stands are taken, the sacrifices given do not feel insignificant.". The story is told keeping "the narrative clear and allowing character-driven scenes to breathe."

Allison Keene of Collider wrote, "Emotional, engrossing" with 5 stars.

== See also ==
- Adaptations of Les Misérables
