= John Frey =

John Frey or Fray may refer to:

- John P. Frey, early 20th-century American labor leader
- John H. Frey, Connecticut politician
- John Fray, Lord Chief Baron of the Exchequer
- John Fray (MP) for Hertfordshire (UK Parliament constituency)
- John Andrew Frey (1929–1997), professor of Romance Languages at George Washington University
