= Éponine =

- Les Misérables character
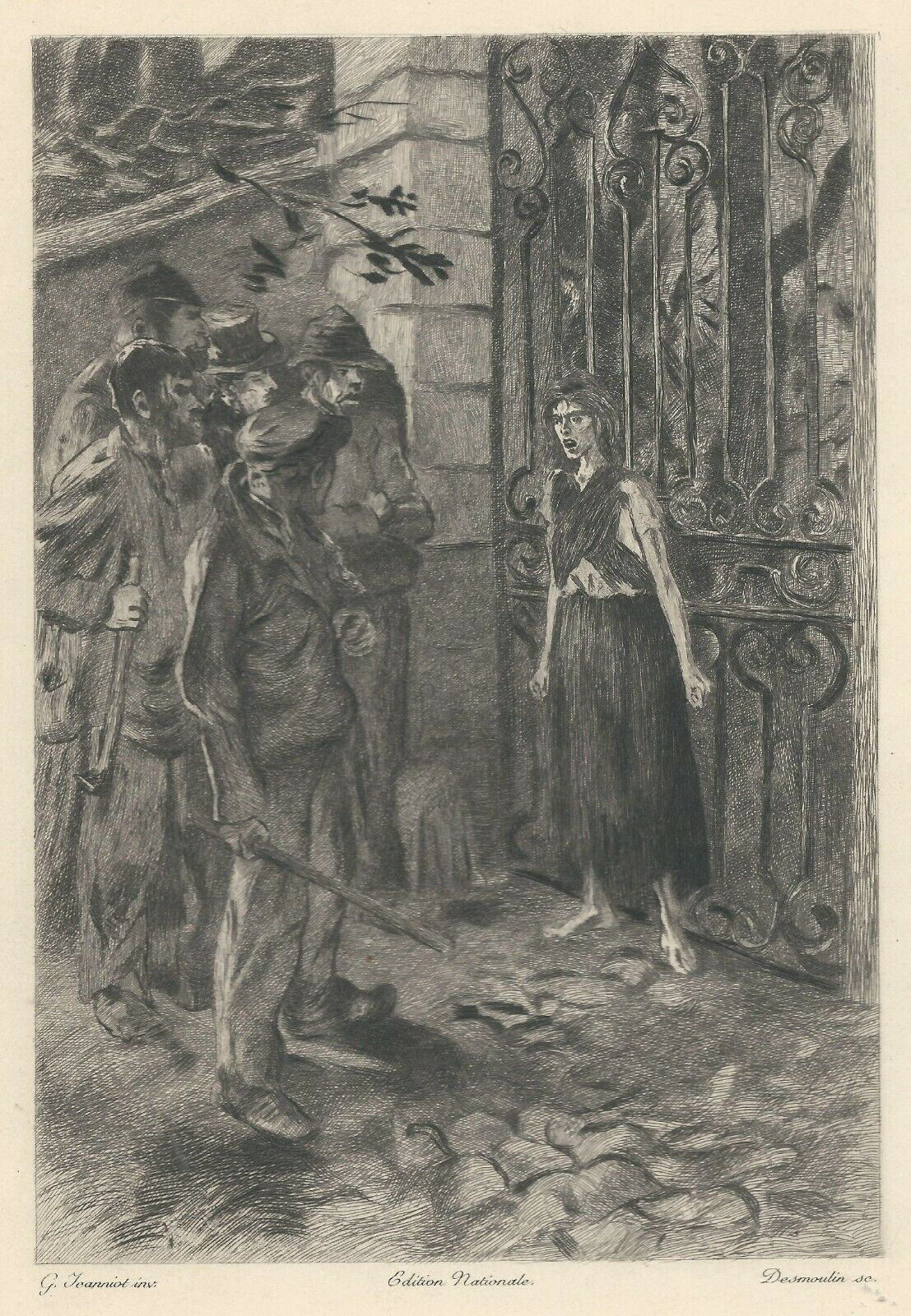
- Éponine intervenes to stop Patron-Minette robbing Valjean's home.
- Created by: Victor Hugo

In-universe information
- Aliases: "Jondrette girl"; "Young working-man"
- Nickname: Ponine
- Gender: Female
- Family: Monsieur Thénardier (father); Madame Thénardier (mother); Azelma (sister); Gavroche (brother); Two younger brothers
- Religion: Roman Catholic
- Nationality: French
- Birth date: late 1816
- Death date: 5 June 1832 (aged 16–17)

Éponine Thénardier (/ˌɛpəˈniːn təˈnɑːrdieɪ/ EP-ə-NEEN tə-NAR-dee-ay, French: [epɔnin tenaʁdje]), also referred to as "Ponine", the "Jondrette girl" and the "young working-man", is a fictional character in the 1862 novel Les Misérables by Victor Hugo.

The character is introduced as a spoiled and pampered child, but appears later in the novel as a ragged and impoverished teenager who speaks in the argot of the Parisian streets, while retaining vestiges of her former charm and innocence.

== In the novel ==
=== Life in Montfermeil ===
Éponine is born in 1816, the oldest child of the Thénardiers. As children, Éponine and her younger sister Azelma are described as pretty, well-dressed, and charming. They are pampered and spoiled by their parents, the Thénardiers, who run an inn in Montfermeil, France. Three years later, when Fantine and her illegitimate daughter Cosette come across the inn, Fantine sees Éponine and Azelma playing outside. Cosette joins the two sisters and the three play together. Fantine asks the Thénardiers to take care of Cosette while she goes to look for work in her hometown. The Thénardiers abuse Cosette, dress her in rags and force her to work, while spoiling their daughters and letting them play. Following their parents' example, Éponine and Azelma are unkind to Cosette and treat her like a servant.

During the 1823 Christmas fair, Éponine and Azelma admire a big, beautiful and expensive doll in a shop window. That night, they play with their own doll, while ignoring Cosette. Their doll is "very much faded, and very old and broken". They then cast the doll aside to play with a kitten. Cosette, never having owned or played with a doll, quickly grabs it and attempts not to be noticed with it. After fifteen minutes, Éponine and Azelma discover that Cosette has taken their doll and tell their mother, who yells at Cosette. Jean Valjean, who has witnessed the scene, leaves the inn and buys the expensive doll. He returns a moment later and gives it to Cosette. For the first time, Éponine and Azelma "looked upon Cosette with envy".

=== Life in Paris ===
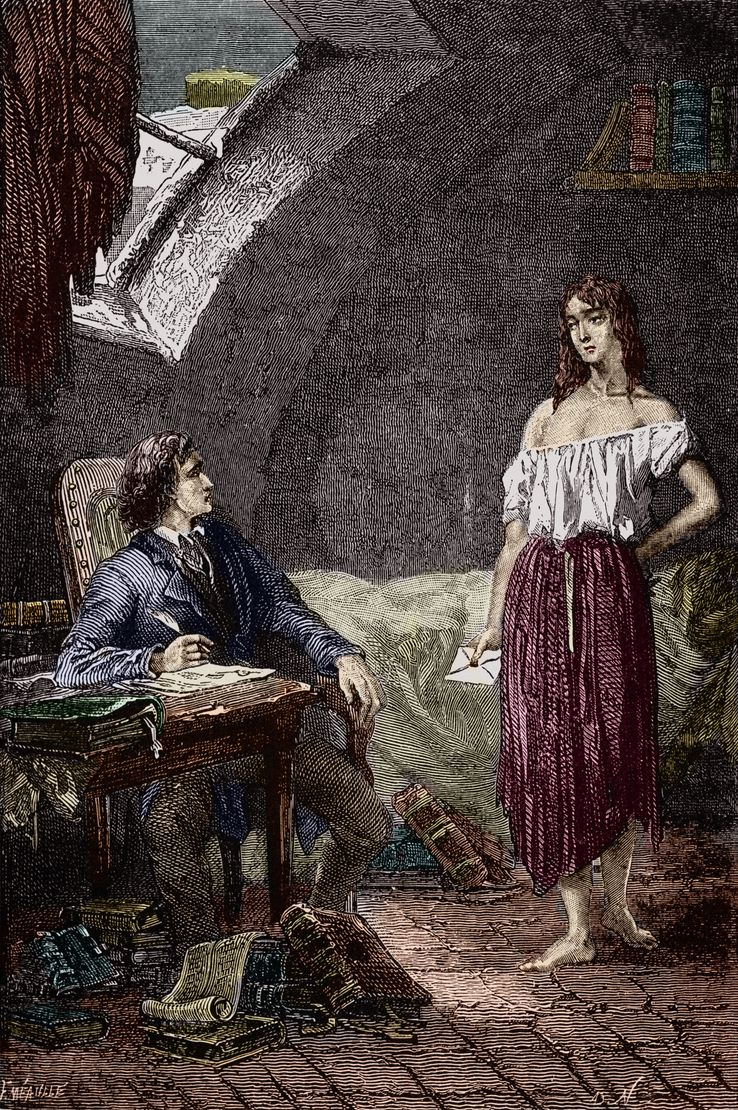
Éponine visits Marius to give him a letter.

Hugo depicts Éponine again in 1832. After her family's bankruptcy of the inn, they move to Paris and live in a small run-down apartment at Gorbeau House under the assumed name of "Jondrette". They live next door to the apartment of Marius Pontmercy. In adolescence, Éponine becomes a "pale, puny, meagre creature", with a hoarse voice like "a drunken galley slave's", having been "roughened by brandy and by liquors". She wears dirty and tattered clothing, consisting solely of a chemise and a skirt. She is missing a few teeth, is barefoot, has tangled hair, bony shoulders, and heavy brooding drooping eyes, while the "grace of her youth was still struggling against the hideous old age brought on by debauchery and poverty" and has only a trace of beauty lingering upon her face. She had "the form of an unripe young girl and the look of a corrupted old woman; fifty years joined with fifteen; one of those beings who are both feeble and horrible at once, and who make those shudder whom they do not make weep". She and Azelma help their father, who writes to rich people under different names, to beg for money. The two sisters pass Marius while running away from the police, unaware that they dropped their package of forged letters begging for alms. Marius takes the package back to his apartment.

The next day, Éponine visits Marius at his apartment and gives him a letter from her father begging for money. Marius notes that the handwriting and the stationery are identical to the letters in the package. Éponine looks around Marius' room and goes to look at Marius' mirror while singing to herself. To impress him, she proves that she is literate by reading aloud a passage from one of his books and writing "The cognes (police) are here" on a piece of paper. Éponine tells Marius that she sometimes goes to the theatre, that he is handsome, and mentions that she has noticed him a number of times before. Changing the subject, Marius hands her back the other letters. Éponine is grateful to him for finding them. She then tells Marius that she sometimes walks by herself at night, how she and her family lived under the arches of bridges the previous winter, how she contemplated drowning herself and that she had hallucinations due to lack of nourishment. Pitying her, Marius gives her five francs, and she thanks him in a chain of argot. Éponine leaves, but not before picking up a piece of hardened bread from Marius' bureau and biting into it.

=== The attack at Gorbeau House ===
After Éponine leaves, Marius observes her and her family in their apartment next door. They live in utter squalor. Marius hears Éponine claim that she has arranged for a philanthropist from the local church to come to their home and give them money to help pay the rent. In an effort to make his family look poorer, Thénardier orders Azelma to punch out the window, which she does, cutting her hand open. It turns out that the "philanthropist" is in reality Jean Valjean, as yet unrecognized by the Thénardiers and known by a different name, and he visits to inspect their circumstances. He is accompanied by Cosette, with whom Marius is in love. Valjean promises to return later with money.

Marius attempts to follow Valjean and Cosette but is unable to pay for a cab, having given Éponine his remaining five francs. When he returns to his room, Éponine asks what is troubling him and offers to assist him. Marius asks her to find the address of the father and daughter that just visited. Éponine reacts bitterly, realizing his romantic interest in the philanthropist's daughter, but agrees to do so after he promises to give her anything she wishes in return.

Éponine leaves. Marius overhears Jondrette and his wife plotting to rob and murder Valjean with the help of the Patron-Minette street gang. Marius informs Javert in the hope of obstructing their plan. After Marius returns, Thénardier orders Éponine to search Marius’ apartment to see if he is there. Hearing this, Marius hides under his bed. She goes in the apartment, but does not inspect it. She once again looks at herself in Marius' mirror and sings. While she does this, she shouts back to her father that she is looking over the room and there is no one present. Éponine leaves the apartment and she and Azelma are sent outside the building to watch for the police. As the crime unfolds, Marius attempts to stop Thénardier by tossing the note Éponine wrote earlier through a crack in the wall. Thénardier recognizes Éponine's writing. They try to escape, but Javert enters and arrests the Thénardiers and the street gang, while Valjean escapes unnoticed. Éponine is not caught, as she had slipped away from her post for a tryst with Montparnasse, a member of Patron-Minette. She is later caught and joins Azelma in prison. Both sisters are released two weeks later due to lack of evidence.

=== Marius, Cosette, and Éponine ===
While in jail, Babet sends a letter to Éponine ordering her to investigate a house at the Rue Plumet. Discovering that Valjean and Cosette live there and knowing that Marius is trying to find Cosette, Éponine sends back a biscuit, signaling that there is nothing valuable there. After six weeks of not finding Marius, she visits the churchwarden Mabeuf and offers to water his garden. After she does this, she asks Mabeuf of Marius' current whereabouts, and he tells her. Éponine finds Marius in a park called "The Field of the Lark". She tries to have a conversation with him, but he is unresponsive. She then tells him that she knows where Cosette lives, hoping to impress him and make him happy. Marius is overjoyed, while Éponine is saddened by his reaction. Marius makes Éponine swear not to tell her father the address, and calls her by her name. Éponine notices this and is surprised and happy that he said her name. Marius still commands her not to tell her father, and she finally promises. As she takes him to the house, she reminds him that he promised to give her something in return for finding Cosette, and he offers her his last five-franc coin. She sadly lets the coin fall to the ground, saying she does not want his money.

Éponine secretly watches Marius each time he goes to visit Cosette. One time, she tries to talk to him, but for the first time she is at a loss for words. The next evening, Éponine follows him to the house and is sitting by the gates lost in thought when Thénardier and his criminal companions arrive to rob the house. Éponine first attempts to distract their attention by giving them friendly greetings. When that fails, she threatens to scream and alert the police and the neighborhood. She then sits back down by the gates and sings to herself. Seeing that Éponine is serious in her threat, the men leave, and she cautiously follows them.

=== Disguise ===
The next day, Éponine devises a plan "to thwart the projects of her father and the bandits upon the house in the Rue Plumet, and to separate Marius and Cosette". Disguised as a boy, she throws Valjean a note that says "remove". He returns to Cosette at the Rue Plumet and tells her they must promptly relocate to their other house and leave for England in a week. Cosette quickly writes to tell Marius and pays Éponine, who is disguised as a workman, to deliver the letter to Marius. Éponine takes the letter with no intention of delivering it.

The following day (5 June), on the night of the insurrection, Éponine visits Courfeyrac's lodgings and waits for Marius, "not to give him the letter, but ... 'to see'". She is still wearing her disguise. Courfeyrac appears and tells her he does not know Marius' whereabouts. Determined that no one else will have Marius, she decides to accompany Courfeyrac to the barricades. She then goes to the Rue Plumet, expecting Marius to visit Cosette at his usual time. When he arrives and discovers that Cosette has departed, Éponine from a hiding place tells Marius that his friends are expecting him at the barricades at the Rue de la Chanvrerie, and she returns there.

=== Death ===
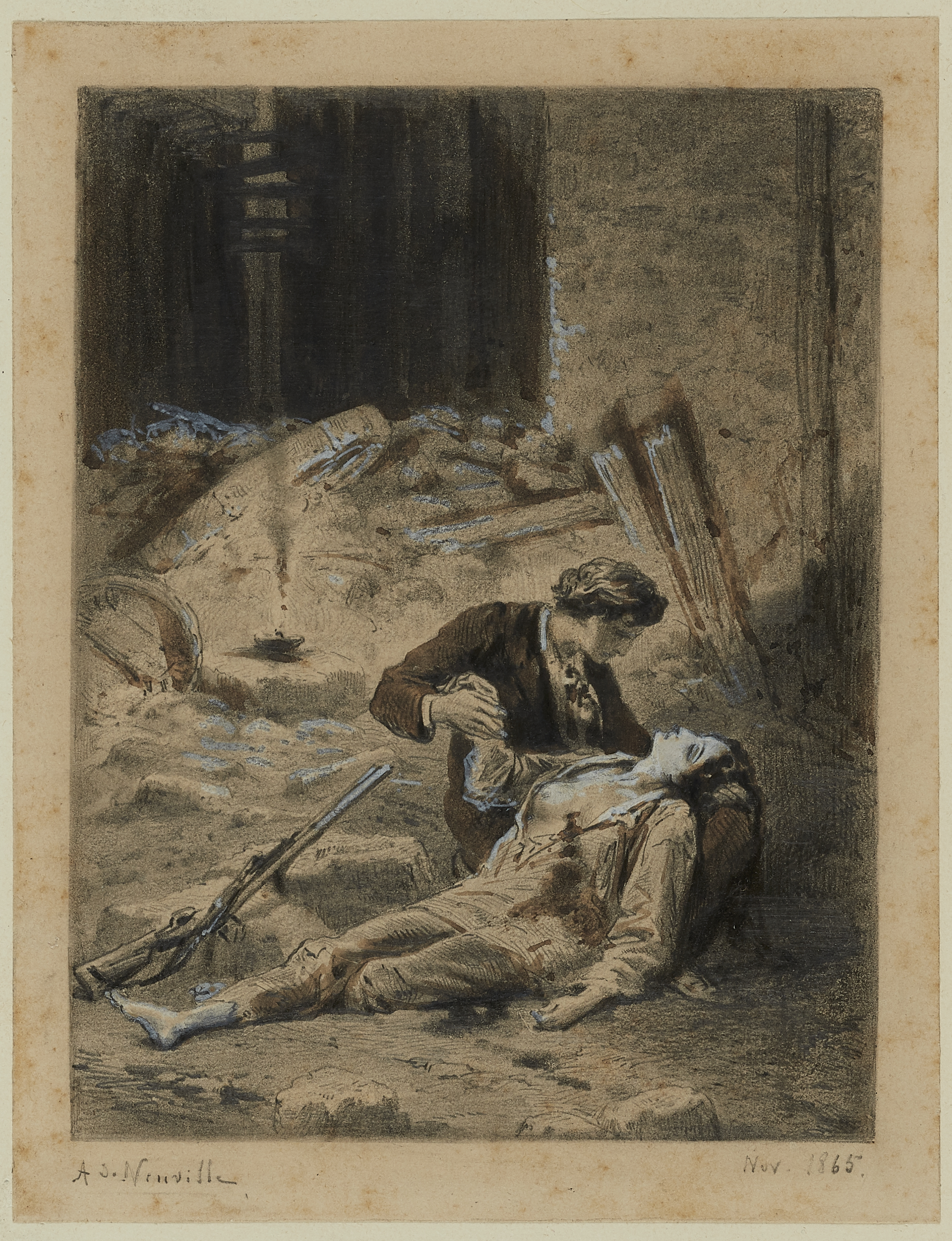
Éponine dies in Marius' arms at the barricade.

Distraught over the loss of Cosette, Marius goes to the barricade, armed with the two pistols Javert had given him, and uses them both during the fighting. While he is searching for a new weapon, a soldier makes it inside the barricade and aims at Marius. Éponine shields Marius from the musket ball, and Marius is unharmed. Marius only recognizes her later, when she is lying at his feet. She tells him she is dying and that she has taken the bullet for him. She also tells him the bullet has pierced through her hand and went out through her back. She asks him to lay her on his knees, and then reveals to Marius that it was she who led him to the barricades, hoping that the two of them would die together. She also admits to him: "And still when I saw him aiming at you, I put up my hand upon the muzzle of the musket. How droll it is! But it was because I wanted to die before you." She then reminisces on their previous encounters, and says she is happy that everyone will die. The bullet hole near Éponine's breast bleeds heavily, and she becomes short of breath. She reveals that Gavroche is her brother, when they hear him singing nearby, and she tells Marius that Gavroche must not see her in case he "scolds" her. Éponine then confesses to Marius she has a letter for him, and that she kept it from him since the day before. She decides to let him take it in fear that he will be angry at her about it in the afterlife. After Marius takes the letter, Éponine requests that he promise to kiss her on the forehead after she dies, which he agrees to do. With her dying breath, Éponine says: "And then, do you know, Monsieur Marius, I believe I was a little in love with you." Éponine dies and Marius kisses her on the forehead as he had promised as "a thoughtful and gentle farewell to an unhappy soul". Thinking it would be inappropriate to read the letter in front of her body, he gently lays her down and goes in a tavern to read it.

Éponine's body is last seen among the other dead from the barricades.

== Significance of the character ==
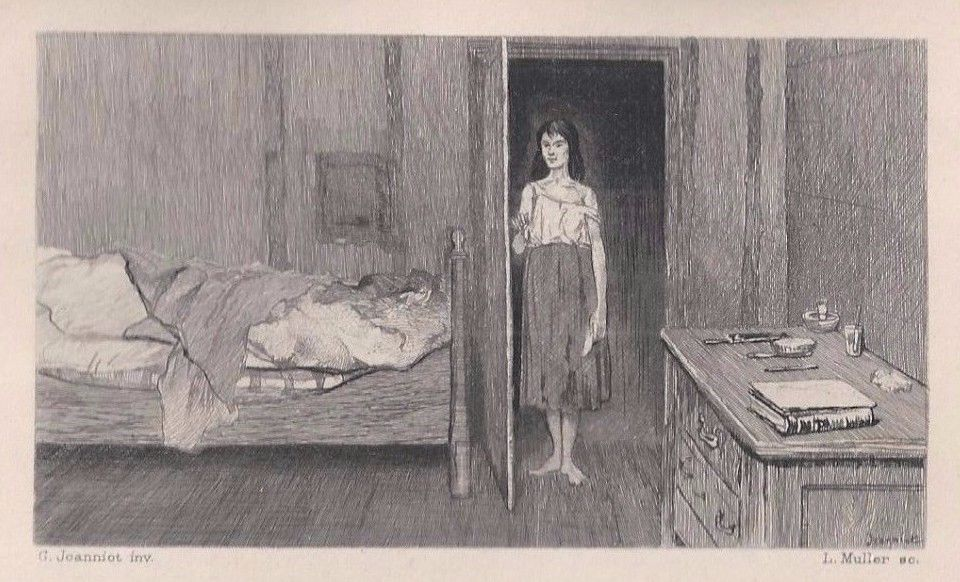
Éponine: A Rose in Misery (1890) by Pierre Jeanniot

John Andrew Frey identified Éponine as a parallel figure to Fantine: "Eponine is symbolic of redeemed types found in Hugo's work—the Mary Magdalene fallen woman redeemed by a deep, albeit romantic and impossible love." He sees her death as typically operatic, a drawn-out farewell scene with an aria-like speech exploring all her feelings. As in Romantic opera: "The dying Eponine recounts her long-held feeling of love for Marius, feelings she interprets as both moral and physical defects making her unworthy." He compares her to the character of La Maheude in Émile Zola's novel Germinal, who also contemplates an alternative life, and "hypothetically thinks about the possibility that they could have been lovers". Kathryn M. Grossman also identifies the redemptive aspect of the character and the parallel with Fantine: "In a much different way [from Fantine], Eponine's devotion to Marius saves her from reiterating the sins of her parents. Her love redeems her, as Valjean and Fantine are redeemed by their love for Cosette."

George Saintsbury argued that Éponine is the most interesting character in the novel, but that Hugo, like Marius, did not take enough notice of her:

The gamin Gavroche puts in a strong plea for mercy, and his sister Eponine, if Hugo had chosen to take more trouble with her, might have been a great, and is actually the most interesting, character. But Cosette—the cosseted Cosette—Hugo did not know our word or he would have seen the danger—is merely a pretty and rather selfish little doll, and her precious lover Marius is almost ineffable.

=== Name ===
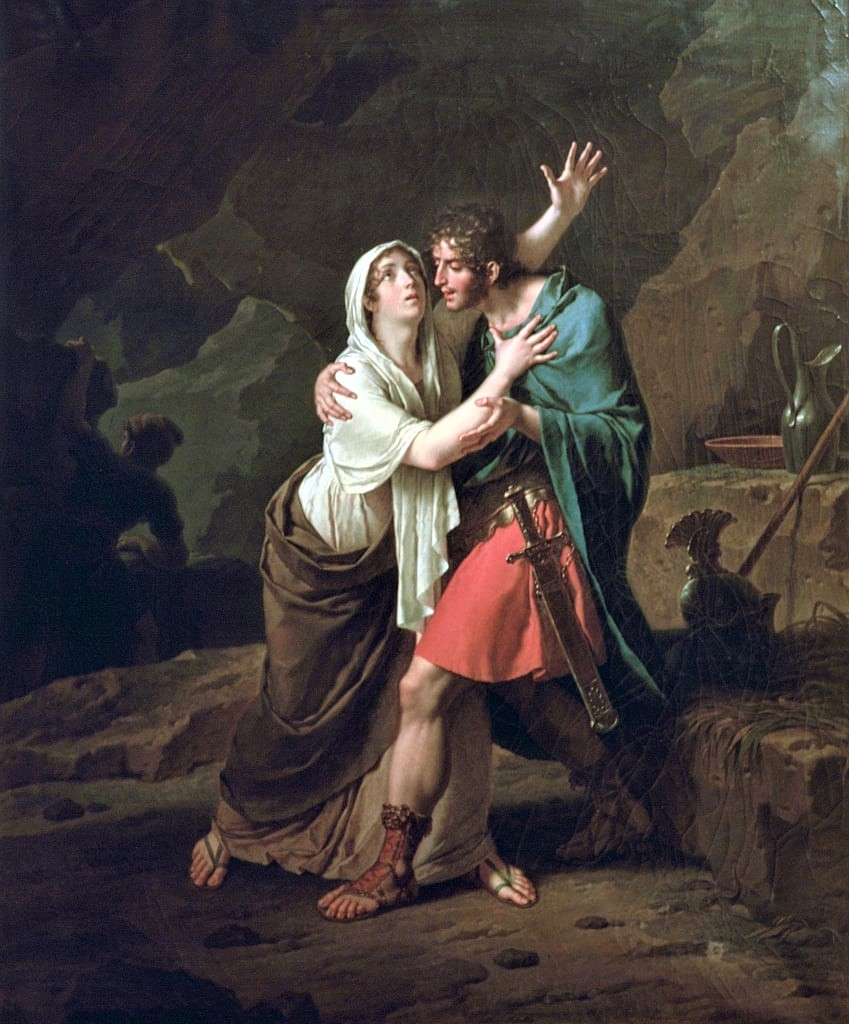
The original Éponine (Epponina), a Gaul. Éponine et Sabinus (1802) by Nicolas-André Monsiau

The name "Éponine" derives from the ancient Gaul Epponina, wife of Julius Sabinus, who rebelled against the Roman empire. She "became the symbol of great patriotism and virtue" by protecting her husband for many years and by choosing to die with him when he was finally captured. The name was quite common among both Republicans and Bonapartists in post-Revolutionary France. Her sister's name "Azelma" also derives from the name of a loyal wife who dies with her husband, the wife of Abdul-aziz, a north African warrior who fights Napoleon. Hugo explains both names as the product of Mme Thénardier's love of "stupid romances", melodramatic novels on exotic themes with exaggeratedly noble characters. Hugo says such names were typical of the period, when there was "an anarchy of baptismal names" as working-class people increasingly gave their children exotic or grandiose names, while the upper classes intentionally adopted lowly-sounding names.

The two sisters were originally named Palmyre and Malvina, but in 1860 Hugo changed them in the drafts of the novel. He may have used the name Éponine because of Charles Baudelaire's poem Les Petites Vieilles (Little Old Ladies) from Les Fleurs du Mal. Dedicated to Hugo, the poem describes broken-down former beauties:

Ces monstres disloqués furent jadis des femmes,
Éponine ou Laïs! Monstres brisés, bossus
Ou tordus, aimons-les! ce sont encor des âmes.

(These dislocated wrecks were women once,
Were Eponine or Lais! hunchbacked freaks,
Though broken let us love them! they are souls.)

== Adaptations ==
Since the original publication of Les Misérables in 1862, the character of Éponine has been in a number of adaptations in numerous types of media based on the novel, such as books, films, musicals, plays and games.

A satirical version of Éponine also appears in the musical Spamalot as part of a contingent of stereotypically "French" stock characters who emerge from the castle of Guy De Lombard in order to inspect the Trojan Rabbit left behind by King Arthur and his knights.

=== In the musical ===
Éponine is also featured in the stage musical adaptation. She is played by two actors, a young girl for Young Éponine in the Montfermeil scenes, and by a young woman for the adolescent Éponine in the later Parisian scenes. Actresses playing Young Éponine and Young Cosette sometimes interchange roles in different performances to equalize performance opportunities and vocal strain.

The musical gives a pointedly sympathetic depiction of Éponine, which has made her one of the show's most popular characters. Throughout the musical, the ragged, independent, and tragic Éponine is starkly contrasted with the demure, innocent, and sheltered Cosette.

Onstage, the role has been played by many actresses including Samantha Barks (who also portrays her in the 2012 film adaptation), Meredith Braun, Kerry Butler, Carrie Hope Fletcher, Sutton Foster, Danielle Hope, Nikki M. James, Celia Keenan-Bolger, Laura Michelle Kelly, Lea Michele, Eva Noblezada, Nathania Ong, Frances Ruffelle, Lea Salonga, and Jess Folley.

==== Differences in the musical ====
There are some notable plot differences in the musical adaptation.

- Éponine only appears as a child in the number "Castle on a Cloud", and does not witness Valjean giving Cosette a doll.
- Éponine and Marius already know each other before Marius meets Cosette.
- Éponine and Marius, in the musical, appear to be best friends, and he is genuinely heartbroken and overcome with grief by her death; while in the novel, Marius does not care much about her, although he is still polite to her in the novel and expresses concern for her as she dies.
- Gavroche and Éponine are siblings. This is explicitly stated in the novel but is only hinted at in the musical, when Gavroche expresses grief at her death.
- Éponine's younger sister Azelma and their two youngest brothers are omitted from the musical.
- In the novel, it is mentioned that Éponine drinks. The musical omits this.
- In the novel, Éponine is missing a few teeth. In the musical they are typically depicted intact.
- There is no reference of Marius and the Thénardier family living in apartments, for the musical shows them interacting with each other on the streets.
- In the novel, Éponine is described and seen delivering letters, including forgeries from her father to wealthy people, anonymously throwing a note to Valjean, and handing Marius a letter from Cosette. In the musical, Éponine, her parents and Patron-Minette pass on their messages verbally to each other, and the only note-passing that she does is during her interaction with Valjean when he intercepts Marius' letter to Cosette.
- In the musical, Éponine, her parents, and Patron-Minette are not arrested after the ambush of Valjean, and the tryst with Montparnasse never happens.
- In the musical, Éponine screams to scare away her father and the bandits from robbing Valjean's house. In the novel, she threatens to scream and cause a commotion if they get too close, but they leave without incident. Marius, Cosette and Valjean are unaware that the attempted robbery ever occurred.
- In the novel, after Marius discovers that Valjean and Cosette have moved from the Rue Plumet, Éponine anonymously tells Marius that the other students are waiting for him at the barricades, and he goes there. In the musical, during the song "One Day More", Marius is contemplating whether to follow Cosette to England, or fight with the other students. Éponine then grabs Marius by the arm and they both run off. They are both next seen a moment later with Enjolras and the students.
- In the musical Marius sees Éponine dressed as a boy before the insurrection starts, while in the novel he only recognizes her after she is shot. The 2012 film adaptation, however, followed the novel more closely with Marius only recognising her after she is shot.
- In the musical, Éponine, dressed as a boy, is sent by Marius to deliver a letter to Cosette. In the novel, Gavroche is sent to deliver it after Éponine's death. Notably though, the musical's 2012 film adaptation instead followed the novel and had Gavroche deliver the letter while Valjean warns him to stay away from danger.
- In the original stage show, Éponine is fatally shot as she returns to the barricades. In the novel, she and Marius are already at the barricades, and she blocks a soldier's shot meant for Marius. However, in the musical's 2012 film adaptation and in the 2014 Broadway revival, Éponine is injured in the same manner as the book.
- At the time of her death in the musical, no speculation is made at first how and where Éponine is injured. When she collapses, Marius notices her hair is damp and opens her coat to reveal that she has been shot in the chest. In the novel, she was shot through her hand first, and the bullet came out through her back. The latter version was used in the 2012 film adaption.
- In the novel, Éponine asks Marius to kiss her forehead after she dies, and he does so. In the musical, she pulls herself up and kisses him with the last of her strength, then falls back and dies. In the 2006 revival, she pulls herself up to attempt to kiss him but dies before she can.
- In the song "Night of Anguish", Enjolras announces Éponine was the first to die. The students mourn her death, resolve to fight in her name, and take her body away. In the novel, Mabeuf was the first to die and is mourned, and only Marius is with Éponine during and after her own death.
- In the stage musical (but not the 2012 film), the spirit of Éponine appears with Fantine to take Valjean to heaven. The novel has no similar scene.
