= Grantaire =

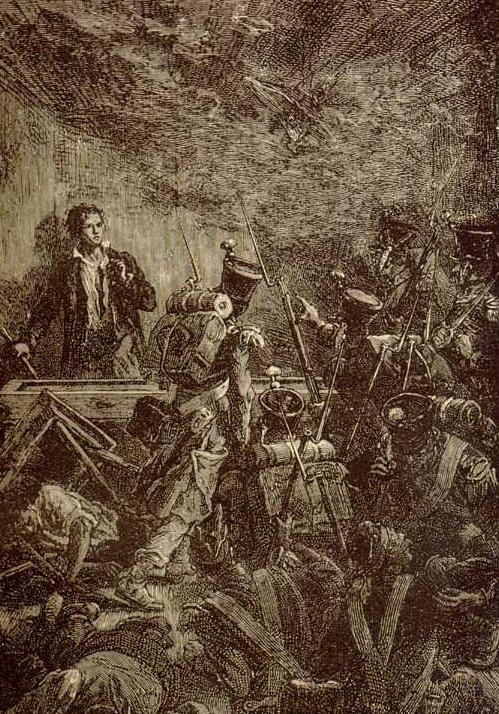
- The deaths of Enjolras and Grantaire
- Created by: Victor Hugo

In-universe information
- Aliases: R, Pylades
- Occupation: Student
- Nationality: French

Grantaire (French pronunciation: [Grɑ̃-tər]) is a fictional character from the 1862 novel Les Misérables by Victor Hugo. He is a student from the South of France and is one of the principal characters of the revolutionary group known as the Friends of the ABC. According to the novel, the Friends of the ABC only tolerate him because of his good humour, and he only joins because of his veneration of the leader, Enjolras. He is a gambler and often drunk.

== Description ==
=== Name ===
Grantaire is said to "sign...with the rebus R", a pun on the French "grand R" (or capital R; pronounced erre), which sounds very similar to "Grantaire". At one point, Bossuet calls him "Capital R".

=== Physical appearance ===
Grantaire is not physically attractive; he is described as "particularly ugly" or "inordinately homely." Contrastingly, Enjolras is described as having "...long fair lashes, blue eyes, that hair flying in the wind, rosy cheeks, pure lips, exquisite teeth."

=== Morality ===
Grantaire is a skeptic, believing in nothing (except, as he later says, Enjolras) and claiming to know nothing, with no values or goals. He takes little interest in the cause of the revolutionary students and is described in the novel as someone who was able to go along without any particular belief. His veneration, love, and admiration for Enjolras is the main reason that Grantaire spends time with the Friends of the ABC, despite Enjolras's scorn for his skepticism. Grantaire is the one in the group who knows the best places for everything in Paris and also about boxing, foot-fencing, and some dances. He is knowledgeable about history, art, and politics, and frequently references classical mythology.

All those words- rights of the people, rights of man, humanity, civilization, religion, progress- are very near meaningless to Grantaire. He smiles at them. Skepticism, that dry rot of the intellect, has left not one entire idea in his mind. He lives in irony. This is his one axiom: The one certainty is a full glass. He ridicules all dedication under all circumstances...

== Narrative ==
Grantaire plays a very small role in planning the June Rebellion. He is not an official member of the Friends of the ABC but is always present, usually intoxicated. He stays because of his admiration, love, and veneration for Enjolras. Enjolras and Grantaire are compared to Orestes and Pylades as one cannot come without the other. They are also compared to Achilles and Patroclus, Alexander and Hephaestion, and several other male couples from Greek history and mythology. However, this is not an indication of any particular friendship or admiration from Enjolras' perspective. Enjolras is offended by Grantaire's indifference to their cause, on one occasion telling him not to "meddle in [the ABC's] affairs." Grantaire is used as the narrative foil of Enjolras. On the day of the rebellion, Grantaire is unconscious from drinking and wakes up only when he realises Enjolras is about to be executed. Grantaire walks in front of the firing squad calling, "Vive la République," or "Long Live the Republic," and after asking for permission, dies hand in hand with him—both of the men smiling.

== Adaptations ==
Grantaire appears in many adaptations of Les Misérables, including the musical. The role was originated by Clive Carter in London’s West End and by Anthony Crivello on Broadway. Crivello reprised his role for Les Misérables: The Dream Cast in Concert and Hadley Fraser played the role in Les Misérables in Concert: The 25th Anniversary.

In the 2012 film version of the musical, the character is played by George Blagden.

He is played by Turlough Convery in the 2018 BBC miniseries.
