= Turlough Convery =

Irish actor (born 1991)

- Born: 18 March 1991 (age 35); Ireland
- Education: Guildford School of Acting
- Occupation: Actor
- Years active: 2013–present

Turlough Convery (born 18 March 1991) is an actor from Ireland. He is best known for his role as Bear in series 3 of the BBC Three series Killing Eve, as Liam in My Mad Fat Diary, and as Arthur Parker in the ITV series Sanditon.

== Early life ==
Born on 18 March 1991, Convery grew up in Northern Ireland and attended Rockport School in Holywood, where he excelled at Drama. He later attended sixth form at Our Lady and St Patrick's College in Belfast, where he received a number of drama prizes. He trained in Musical Theatre at the Guildford School of Acting, where he won the 2013 Stephen Sondheim Society Student Performer of the Year Award.

== Career ==
Convery has appeared in films such as Ready Player One and Sense and Sensibility, and television series such as Netflix Resident Evil. His other notable roles include the Channel 4 series Fresh Meat, the 2019 psychological horror film Saint Maud, the 2021 film Belfast, the 2014 Black Mirror episode 'White Christmas', the BBC One series Poldark, and the 2018 miniseries Les Misérables.

== Personal life ==
Convery has been married to his long-term partner Francesca since 2018.

Turlough has a rich sporting history and played Goalkeeper for St Brigid’s GAC (Belfast) Gaelic Football Team and front row forward for Belfast Harlequins rugby team.

== Filmography ==
=== Film ===
Year	Title	Role	Notes
2015	MindGamers	Rollo	
2016	A Quiet Passion	Thomas (Butler)	
2017	Dragonheart: Battle for the Heartfire	Walter	Direct-to-video
2017	The Current War	Rough Looking Man	
2018	Ready Player One	Chief Oology Expert	
2019	Saint Maud	Christian	
2020	Pixie	Mickey O'Brien	
2021	Belfast	Minister	
2023	Wake Up	Kevin	
2024	The Damned	Hakon	
2026	Sense and Sensibility	Sir John Middleton	

=== Television ===
Year	Title	Role	Notes
2013	Fresh Meat	Diarmuid	Episode 3.4
2014	Siblings	Tom Flack	Episode #1.3
2014	Black Mirror	Stingray	Episode: "White Christmas"
2014–2015	My Mad Fat Diary	Liam	8 episodes
2014–2016	Lovesick	McNeish	2 episodes
2015	River	Frankie Stevenson	6 episodes
2016	Hoff the Record	Policeman	Episode #2.3
2016–2018	Poldark	Tom Harry	15 episodes
2018	Doing Money	Declan	TV film
2019	Les Misérables	Grantaire	3 episodes
2019	Temple	Simon Reynolds	3 episodes
2019–2023	Sanditon	Arthur Parker	19 episodes
2020	Killing Eve	Bear	7 episodes
2021	Anne Boleyn	Henry Norris	2 episodes
2022	Resident Evil	Richard Baxter	4 episodes
2024	House of the Dragon	Lord Mooton	Episodes: "Regent" and "The Red Sowing"
2024	Slow Horses	Dancer Blaine	2 episodes
2026	Outlander	Benjamin Cleveland	4 episodes
