= Enjolras =

Fictional character in Les Misérables

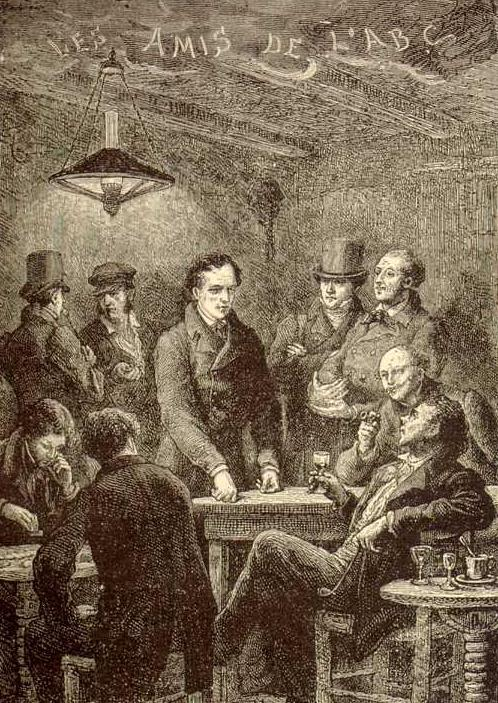
- Enjolras at a meeting of the Friends of the ABC (seated, right)
- Created by: Victor Hugo

In-universe information
- Aliases: Apollo, Antinous, Orestes, The Leader
- Gender: Male
- Occupation: Student; Revolutionary
- Affiliation: Friends of the ABC
- Family: Unknown Bourgeois
- Nationality: French

Enjolras (French pronunciation: [ɑ̃ʒolʁa(s)]) is a fictional character who acts as the charismatic leader of the Friends of the ABC in the 1862 novel Les Misérables by Victor Hugo. In both the novel and the musical that it inspired, Enjolras is a revolutionary who fights for a France with more free and equal rights for the poor, weak, sick, needy, disposed, disabled, and oppressed masses, ultimately dying for his beliefs in the June 1832 rebellion.

== Description ==
=== Physical ===
Enjolras is described as "a charming young man who was capable of being fearsome" and as "Antinous wild." He is said to have the appearance of "long fair lashes, blue eyes, hair flying in the wind, rosy cheeks, pure lips, and exquisite teeth."

=== Political and moral ===
Enjolras is a republican, whose views are significantly shaped by the Montagnards of the French Revolution. The "divine right" of revolution that he expresses is said to go "as far as Robespierre," and Hugo declares that "in the Convention, he would have been Saint Just." His social philosophy is influenced by that of Voltaire and Jean-Jacques Rousseau; whom he declares himself to "admire," in particular Rousseau's theory on the social contract.

Late in the novel, Enjolras "come[s] to accept... the transformation of the great French Republic into the immense human republic," and speaks of a "revolution of the True" that will "light up the whole human race." In the same speech, he seems to draw a religious parallel, declaring the barricades of the failed 1832 uprising to be a place where "day embraces night, and says: I will die with thee and thou shalt be born again with me."

Though he embraces violence as a necessary means of revolution, Enjolras also abhors it: upon executing a member of the insurrectionary mob (Le Cabuc) who has murdered a householder, he declares that while "what [Le Cabuc] did is horrible... what [he, Enjolras] has done is terrible... I have judged myself also, and you shall soon see to what I have sentenced myself." "Death," he says, "I use thee, but I hate thee."

== Enjolras' narrative ==
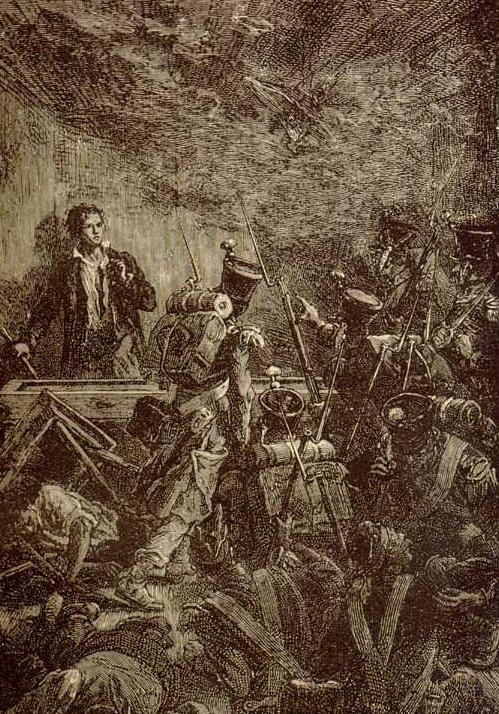
The execution of Enjolras

=== The Friends of the ABC ===
Enjolras is the leader of Les Amis de l'ABC (the Friends of the ABC), a group of radical French republican students. In the original French, the name of the group is a pun: "ABC" is homophonous with "abaissé," the "abased people." Thus Hugo writes that the society had "as its aim, in appearance the education of children; in reality, the elevation of men."

On 5 June 1832, the Friends of the ABC become involved in the June Rebellion that arises during the funeral of Jean Maximilien Lamarque, a popular critic of the monarchy. Enjolras takes command of a barricade they construct in the Rue de la Chanvrerie, overseeing its fortification and defense. Shortly following this, a test of leadership arises: the murder of a local householder by Le Cabuc, an insurrectionary at the barricade, leads Enjolras to execute Le Cabuc, though he deplores the act and declares that "[i]n the future no man shall slay his fellow."

The first assault on the barricade by the National Guard fells the red flag that signifies revolution; when Enjolras calls for volunteers to raise the flag, an elderly bibliophile called Mabeuf undertakes the task and is killed in the process. Enjolras, moved by his courage, takes the bullet-torn coat from his body and raises it as the barricade's new flag.

When Gavroche Thénardier identifies one of the barricade's defenders as the police spy Javert, Enjolras is prepared to trade his life for that of ABC member Jean Prouvaire; however, the execution of Prouvaire causes Enjolras to decree Javert's execution (Javert is later spared by Jean Valjean).

By daybreak on 6 June, Enjolras comes to understand that the uprising has failed, and the barricade has been abandoned. The revolutionaries agree to defend it nevertheless; however, Enjolras argues that it is unnecessary for all to die, and insists that some few men escape disguised as Guardsmen. Following this, aware that he and all those others who remain will die, he delivers a vast speech envisioning the future made possible by their sacrifice: a future filled with liberty, equality, brotherhood and peace. "[T]he hours in which we live... is a gloomy hour, but of such is the terrible price of the future," he says; "[o]h! the human race shall be delivered, uplifted, and consoled! We affirm it on this barricade."

An extensive assault on the barricade results in the deaths of almost all of its defenders. Enjolras is cornered by Guardsmen in a nearby tavern and throws aside his weapon, prepared to be shot. He welcomes the execution, as it will have meant he died for his cause. He is joined in his last moments by Grantaire—a cynic and drunkard. Though Grantaire has previously scoffed at republican ideology, he declares himself a republican and asks Enjolras for permission to die with him. Enjolras had previously despised Grantaire for his skepticism (and, to a lesser extent, his drunkenness). Despite that, Enjolras welcomes Grantaire in sharing his martyr-like death. The two die hand in hand in the same volley, Enjolras pinned to the wall, standing, and Grantaire lying at his feet.

== Adaptations ==
Since the original publication of Les Misérables in 1862, the character of Enjolras has appeared in a number of adaptations in various media based on the novel, such as books, films, musicals, plays and games.

=== In the musical ===
Enjolras is featured in the Les Misérables stage musical. His role is usually sung by either a baritone or a tenor.

The musical omits much of the political background of the Friends of the ABC and the June Rebellion; it also presents Marius and Enjolras as being much closer friends than they are in the novel. Though many of the events at the barricade feature in the musical, Enjolras is often shown as dying while raising the red flag atop the barricade, a conflation of his death with the death of Mabeuf. In the 2012 film adaptation, his death is similar to that in the book. He was portrayed by David Burt in the original cast of the West End production, Michael Maguire in the original Broadway cast and 10th anniversary concert, Anthony Warlow in the original Australia cast, Aaron Lazar in the original 2006 Broadway revival cast, Kyle Scatliffe in the original 2014 Broadway revival cast, Ramin Karimloo in the 25th anniversary concert, Bradley Jaden and Jamie Muscato in the all-star staged concert, Aaron Tveit in the 2012 film adaptation, and Joseph Quinn in the 2018 BBC miniseries.
