= Marius Pontmercy =

Fictional character from Les Misérables

- Les Misérables character
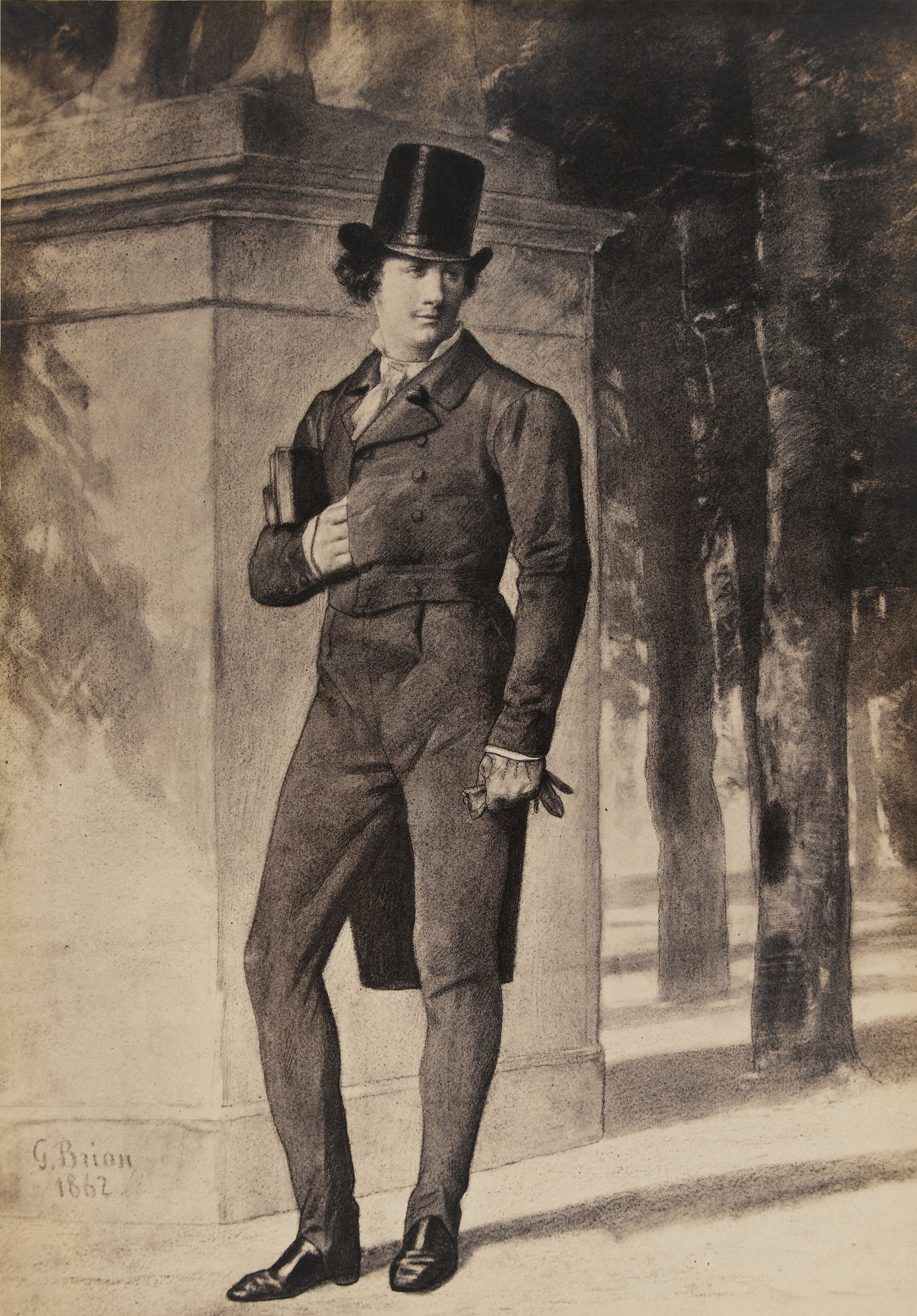
- Marius sees Cosette for the first time, illustration by Gustave Brion
- Created by: Victor Hugo

In-universe information
- Full name: Marius Pontmercy
- Alias: Baron Pontmercy
- Gender: Male
- Title: Baron
- Occupation: Lawyer; Revolutionary; Student
- Affiliation: Les Amis de l'ABC (Friends of the ABC)
- Family: Colonel Georges Pontmercy (father); Monsieur Gillenormand (maternal grandfather); Mademoiselle Gillenormand (maternal half-aunt)
- Spouse: Cosette
- Relatives: Jean Valjean (adoptive father-in-law); Fantine (mother-in-law); Félix Tholomyès (father-in-law)
- Religion: Roman Catholic
- Nationality: French

Marius Pontmercy (French pronunciation: [maʁjys pɔ̃mɛʁsi]) is a fictional character, one of the protagonists of Victor Hugo's 1862 novel Les Misérables. He is a young student, and the suitor of Cosette. Believing Cosette lost to him, and determined to die, he joins the revolutionary association Friends of the ABC, which he associates with, but is not a part of, as they take part in the 1832 June Rebellion. Facing death in the fight, his life is saved by Jean Valjean, and he subsequently weds Cosette, a young woman whom Valjean had raised as his own.

== In the novel ==
=== Marius and his father ===
When Marius first appears, he is living with his rich and monarchist grandfather, Monsieur Gillenormand. All his life, he has been told that his father (Georges Pontmercy, a colonel under Napoleon) abandoned him to Gillenormand. Shortly after Marius turns seventeen, he is sent to see his father, who is ill. He arrives just after his father dies. His father has left Marius a note, instructing him to help Thénardier in any way possible, since the Colonel believes that Thénardier saved his life at the Battle of Waterloo.

While Marius is visiting church, Mabeuf, the church warden, tells him that his father has been coming to mass regularly, hiding behind a pillar so as to not violate an agreement with Gillenormand that would cause his son to be disinherited. Marius begins looking up his father in the official military histories and after learning that his father was a highly decorated veteran of Napoleon's army, who had been made a baron and a colonel by Napoleon (though neither the barony nor the rank of colonel is recognized by the current regime). As a consequence, Marius develops a kind of idol-worship of his father. After an argument with his grandfather, Marius moves out and refuses financial assistance from his family. His grandfather instructs Marius' aunt to send Marius money every month, but Marius always returns it.

=== The Friends of the ABC ===
Marius meets Courfeyrac, a fellow student, who introduces him to a society called the Friends of the ABC, a political group committed to republican revolution. Almost immediately, Marius' Bonapartist beliefs come into conflict with the republican views of the group's members. Marius nevertheless remains on good terms with them—especially Courfeyrac, with whom he lives for a time. "In a few days," Hugo writes, "Marius was the friend of Courfeyrac... Marius, in Courfeyrac's presence, breathed freely, a new thing for him." Marius descends further into poverty and, despite all his hardships, manages to complete his studies and become a recognized lawyer. On Courfeyrac's advice, he learns German and English in order to work for a publisher translating manuscripts into French.

=== Jean Valjean and Cosette ===
Marius regularly takes walks in the Luxembourg Garden, where he frequently sees Cosette and Jean Valjean, and does not pay much attention to either. After a six month break from walking in the Luxembourg Gardens, he returns to find that Cosette has quickly grown into a young lady, and falls in love with her. He returns every day to see her, pretending to read a book. Eventually, Marius follows Valjean and Cosette home, where he asks their doorman about Cosette. Valjean learns of this and, fearing that Marius is a spy working for the police inspector Javert, moves away that week.

=== Éponine ===
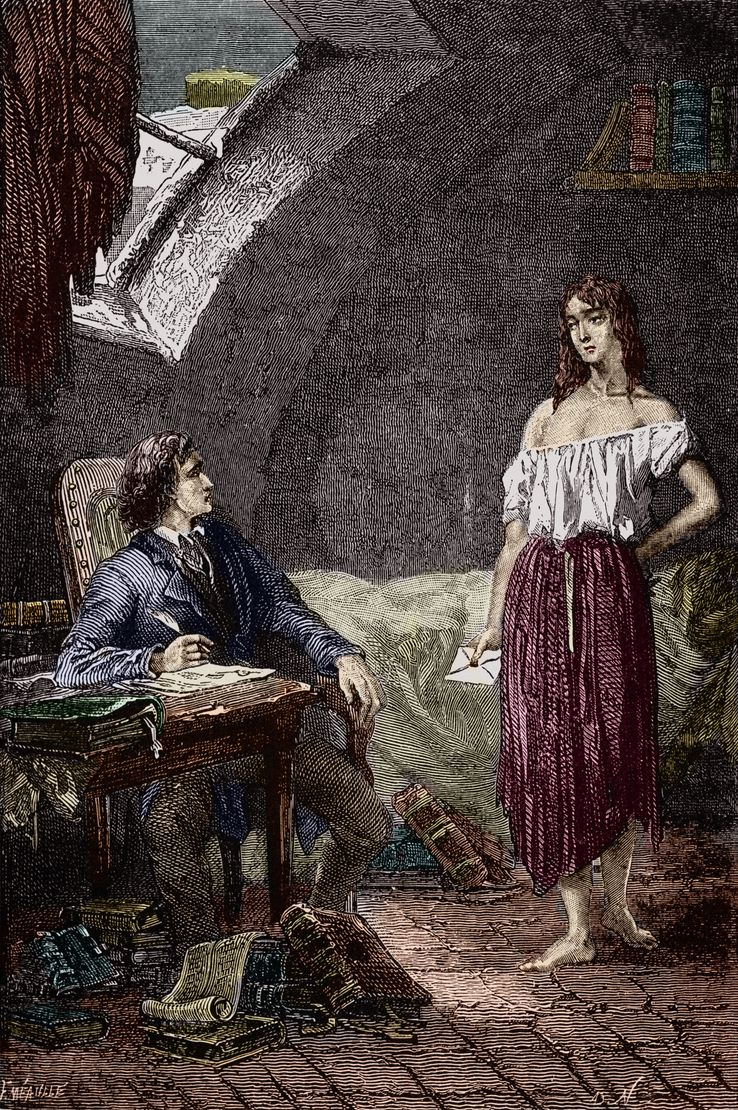
Marius is visited by Éponine.

Having not seen Cosette for months, and not knowing where she might have gone, Marius is tormented over trying to locate her. One early February day, he encounters Éponine and Azelma Thénardier, running away from the police. He recovers an envelope the girls have dropped. Back at his apartment, he examines the four letters it contains and realizes that they are fraudulent pleas for help, all in the same handwriting with the same misspellings, but containing different stories and signatures.

The next day, Éponine visits Marius, gives him a letter and begs for money. Upon reading it, he recognizes it is yet another in the series he read last night. Éponine proves to Marius that she is literate, and tells Marius that he is handsome. Marius hands her back the packet of letters, and she happily takes them. Feeling sympathetic to her, Marius gives her his last five francs.

=== The attack at Gorbeau House ===
Marius begins to take an interest in her family, the Jondrettes (who are his neighbors). Peering through a crack in the wall, Marius sees Jean Valjean and Cosette talking with Jondrette about returning to give the family money. Marius asks Éponine to find Valjean and Cosette's address. He tells her that if she does this, he will give her whatever she wants. After she leaves, Marius overhears Jondrette talking about robbing and killing Valjean. Distressed, Marius visits Javert, who gives him two pistols and instructs him to fire them during the robbery.

When Valjean returns to Jondrette's house, Jondrette and Patron-Minette attack and bind Valjean. Jondrette reveals that his name is actually Thénardier, a fact that shocks Marius. He does not want Valjean to die, but does not want to betray the man that "saved" his father at Waterloo. Marius surreptitiously warns Thénardier, and Patron-Minette throw a rope ladder out the window and are about to flee when Javert intervenes and arrests them all, except Valjean, who escapes through the window. Marius then moves out of the Gorbeau tenement.

=== Marius and Cosette ===
Marius seeks Cosette after he fell in love with her beauty. He assumes her name was "Ursula" after he finds a handkerchief she dropped. He finally sees where their house was and visits often, but doesn't really talk to anyone except the guard outside. Then, one day, Cosette and Valjean were gone, he asks the guard, but has no idea where they moved. Marius used to see them every day, but now that they were gone, he falls into depression. After her release from prison, Éponine seeks out Marius. She tells him she found Cosette's address, and leads him to the house. Marius, after some days of waiting, decides to write a 15-page love letter to Cosette which she finds hidden under a stone. Cosette immediately falls in love and Marius reveals himself as a shadowy figure standing behind her. Their shared love blossoms for about six weeks, but Valjean shatters that bliss when he announces to Cosette that they will be leaving for England in a week. Cosette tells Marius about the move, causing much distress for the pair. Marius goes to Gillenormand to try to reconcile and to get permission to marry Cosette. However, after Gillenormand suggests that Marius make Cosette his mistress, Marius storms out of the house, insulted. Marius returns to Cosette's house, but finds the house no longer occupied. Advised by a voice (Éponine) that his friends are waiting for him in the rue de la Chanvrerie, he goes to the barricade that the Friends of the ABC have set up, determined to die with them. At this point, Marius saw no point in living, as Cosette was to move away.

=== The barricade ===
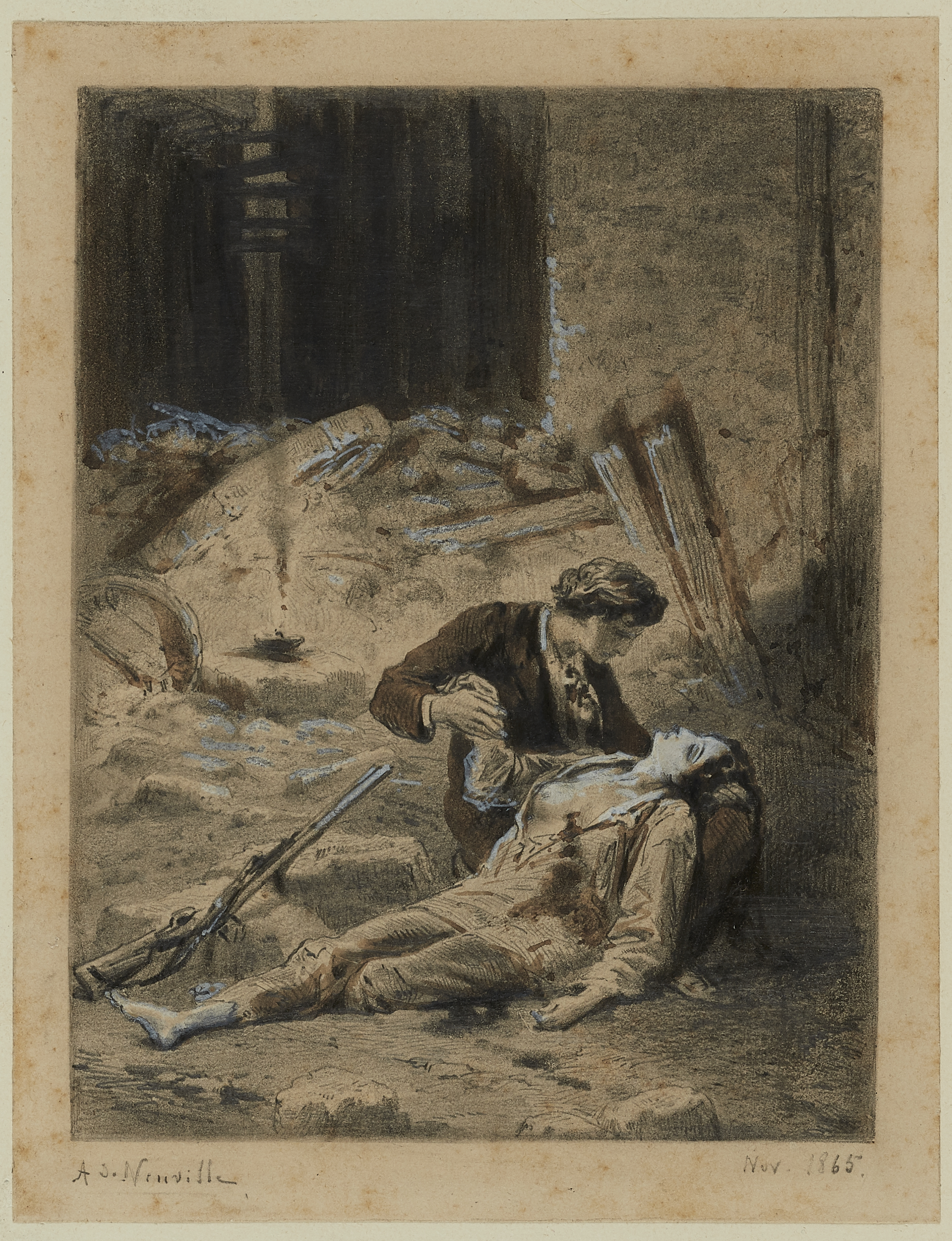
Marius cradles the dying Éponine at the barricades.

Éponine, disguised as a boy, places herself in front of a musket to save Marius' life. Marius drives the enemies away by holding a torch to a powder keg, and threatens to blow up the barricade. Afterwards, he finds Éponine lying on the ground, fatally shot. She confesses to Marius that it was she who told him to go to the barricades, and saved his life because she wanted to die before him. She also tells him she has a letter for him. She asks Marius to promise to kiss her on the forehead after she dies, which he agrees. With her last breath, Éponine confesses her love for him, and dies. The letter she had concealed is from Cosette, and reveals her whereabouts and when she will leave for England. Marius writes a letter back to Cosette, saying since she left again with no forwarding address, he would fulfill his promise and die for her. He gives the letter to Gavroche, to deliver; however, Gavroche delivers the letter to Valjean. Valjean goes to the barricade to find Marius, disguised as a volunteer. When Valjean is tasked with executing Javert, Marius assumes that he has done so, and considers Valjean to be a murderer.

=== Rescue ===
As the barricade falls, Marius has multiple head wounds and is shot in the collarbone. Jean Valjean rescues him, and they escape through the sewer. When they reach the gate of the sewer, Valjean runs into Thénardier, who believes Valjean has killed Marius, and offers to unlock the gate if Valjean will give him the money on Marius' corpse. Thénardier secretly cuts a piece of Marius' jacket off which had his family's crest on it. Jean Valjean unlocks the gate and runs into Javert, who had been waiting to apprehend Thénardier. Valjean convinces Javert to help him bear Marius home to his grandfather.

=== The wedding and afterwards ===
After six months of raging fever, Marius regains full consciousness. Gillenormand gives Marius permission to marry Cosette and the two men reconcile. Marius and Cosette are married on 16 February 1833, and the wedding day is a happy one.

After the wedding, Valjean visits Marius and reveals his past. Marius, horrified, agrees with Valjean that it would be best if Valjean never sees Cosette again. Valjean wishes not to be permanently separated from Cosette, so Marius grants him one visit per evening. Marius thinks of Valjean as a criminal, and slowly pushes Valjean out of Cosette's life. While Marius quietly searches for the real origin of Cosette's money, Valjean loses the will to live. A few weeks later, a disguised Thénardier comes to Marius's residence to visit the Baron Gillenormand, attempting to blackmail Valjean. Marius sees through the disguise and asks what Thénardier wants. Thénardier inadvertently reveals to Marius that Valjean had earned all his money honestly, and that Javert committed suicide—Valjean did not kill Javert. Thénardier tries to convince Marius that Valjean is a murderer, showing Marius the piece cut off the coat of Valjean's "victim" as proof. Pulling out the old bloodied coat that he had been saving in a safe, Marius accurately matches the piece of cloth to that of the coat he wore in the barricades, and announces that he is the man who Valjean supposedly murdered. He then gives Thénardier a large sum of money, repaying his father's death, and orders him to leave France for America. Realizing that Valjean is an honest man who saved Marius' life, Marius and Cosette rush to reconcile with Valjean. They arrive at Valjean's and apologize; Valjean forgives them. Having been very ill, he wanted to see Cosette on her wedding day before he dies minutes later.

== In the musical ==
Marius is a principal character in the stage musical based on the novel of the same name. His role is best suited for a high baritone or a tenor. Onstage, the role has been played by many actors including Michael Ball, Simon Bowman, Chris Diamantopoulos, Hadley Fraser, Gareth Gates, Adam Jacobs, Nick Jonas, Peter Lockyer, Ricky Martin, Chris McCarrell, Andy Mientus, Hugh Panaro, Hayden Tee, Jac Yarrow, and John Lloyd Young.

=== Differences in the musical ===
Marius' role in the musical is notably different.

- The musical omits the subplot involving Thénardier and Marius' father.
- Éponine and Marius, in the musical, appear to be best friends, and he is genuinely heartbroken and overcome with grief by her death; while in the novel, Marius does not care much about her, although he is still polite to her in the novel and expresses concern for her as she dies.
- Marius' grandfather M. Gillenormand was featured in the original French production, and was subsequently omitted from the musical, as is Marius' early life.
- In the novel, Marius is not particularly involved with the Friends of the ABC prior to his appearance at the barricade. In the musical, Marius appears to be a committed member of the society.
- In the novel, Marius' closest friend among the students is Courfeyrac. In the musical, he appears to be closer to Enjolras, though he participates in friendly interactions with others.
- Marius' political opinions play a larger role in the novel, where he is a Bonapartist, which is a point of conflict between him and the Friends of the ABC.
- Marius' romance with Cosette progresses more rapidly, and it appears that he first sees Cosette, meets her, and prepares to leave for the barricade in the space of one day. In the novel, his feelings for Cosette develop more gradually, and he is separated from her for about six months before he finds her again.
- Marius' lodging at the Gorbeau House is not mentioned in the musical, and the scene in which he spies on the Jondrettes is omitted.
- In the musical, when Valjean tells Marius of his past as a convict and that he must leave, lest he embarrass them at their wedding. Marius is shocked at his revelation, but, knowing that Valjean has done so much for Cosette, and that it would crush her if he were to suddenly leave, tries to persuade Valjean to stay. Eventually, he reluctantly accepts Valjean's decision, and agrees to Valjean's request that he never tell Cosette. In the novel, Marius is rather shrewd and cruel, saying that Valjean would only embarrass both Cosette and himself and tells him to go, granting him a little time with Cosette each night.
- In the musical, Marius and Cosette visit the dying Jean Valjean right after their wedding.

== Adaptations ==
Since the original publication of Les Misérables in 1862, the character of Marius has appeared in a large number of adaptations of the novel, including books, films, musicals, plays and games.

== Name and pronunciation ==
Marius is best known as the name of a Roman general, Gaius Marius. The General's name derives from Mars, the Roman god of war. The French pronunciation of Marius Pontmercy is [maʁjys pɔ̃mɛʁsi]. Marius Pontmercy is based on Victor Hugo's younger self, and gets his first name from Hugo's middle name (Marie).
