= John Andrew Frey =

American philologist (1929–1997)

- Born: August 29, 1929
- Died: August 22, 1997 (aged 67)
- Education: Catholic University of America
- Occupation: Philologist
- Parent(s): George Henry Frey; Marie Berter

John Andrew Frey (August 29, 1929 – August 22, 1997) was an American philologist.

== Early life ==
John "Jack" Andrew Frey was born on August 29, 1929, the son of George Henry Frey and Marie Berter.

Frey was a Fulbright Scholar. In 1955 he collaborated to The Stylistic Relationship Between Poetry and Prose in the Cántico Espiritual of San Juan de la Cruz, Volumes 52-55. He graduated in 1957 and his thesis was Motif symbolism in the disciples of Mallarmé, which he published in 1969.

== Career ==
John Frey became a professor of Romance Languages at George Washington University. He was a specialist in 19th century French literature, and was an author of books on French symbolism (The aesthetics of the Rougon-Macquart, 1976), Emile Zola, and Victor Hugo (Les Contemplations of Victor Hugo: The Ash Wednesday Liturgy, 1988, and A Victor Hugo Encyclopedia, 1999). He also wrote magazine articles on François-René de Chateaubriand, Honoré de Balzac, Washington Irving, and Andre Gide. Frey criticized the use of medieval imagery in symbolist writing: "The whole representation of the Middle Ages, the captive princess, the enchanted castles, fairies, ghosts, and knights-errants... is oriented towards a sensualism. One is reminded of Swinburne making use of the Pre-Raphaelities in England... It is the cloaking of earthly desires in a mantle of aristocracy, of manor houses, gilded ladies, estates swarming with peacocks and swans, of boat and garden parties, and the perpetual games of love."

== Personal life ==
John Frey and Peter Louis Morris, an expert in French cuisine, were together 43 years. They met while they were both students at Catholic University. Though fellow students, they met at what was at the time Washington, D.C., most popular gay venues, the Chicken Hut, a piano bar/restaurant on H Street near Lafayette Park. The Mattachine Society sponsored biweekly Sunday afternoon gay dances. Morris was born on December 29, 1929, in Peekskill, New York, the son of Louis Morris and Dorothea Chaplin. Frey died on August 22, 1997, Morris died on August 29, 2010. They are buried together at Congressional Cemetery and their tomb consists of two benches and an inscribed table.
