= Friends of the ABC =

Fictional association in Les Misérables by Victor Hugo

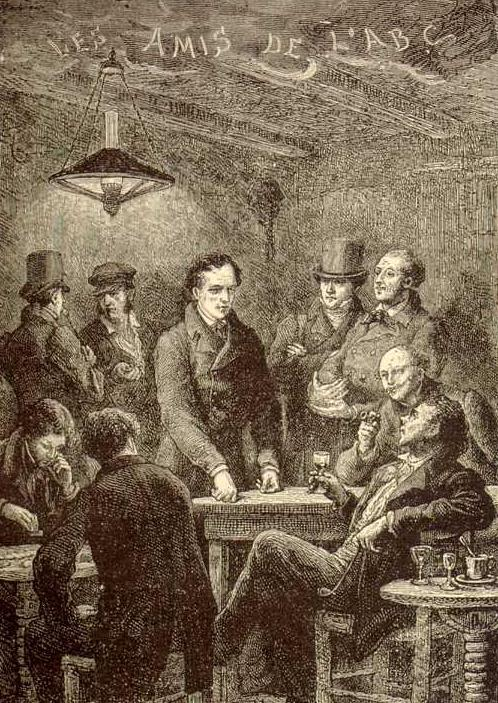
A meeting of the Friends of the ABC

The Friends of the ABC (French: Les Amis de l'ABC), or simply the ABC, is a fictional association of revolutionary French republican students featured in the 1862 novel Les Misérables by Victor Hugo. In French, the name of the society is a pun, in which abaissés ('the abased, humiliated, degraded') is pronounced [abese], very similar to A-B-C ([ɑ be se]). Their members represent a wide variety of political viewpoints, ranging from communist agitation to advocacy for democracy to supporting the Levellers and more, but on 5 June 1832 they all join the popular insurrection known as the June Rebellion and organize the construction of a massive barricade. They are based on the real political group Friends of the People (French: Société des Amis du Peuple). Hugo brings them into the narrative when Marius Pontmercy, one of the novel's principal characters, attaches himself to the group without becoming one of them. With their fight led by Enjolras, all of the members of the group die during the rebellion.

Characters Jean Valjean and Gavroche both also fight with the student rebellion, with Valjean barely making it out alive and Gavroche dying. The central story is also told in the 1980 musical version of Les Misérables, though many of the members lack characterization in the musical.

== Role in the novel ==
The Friends of the ABC is a reference to the historical Society of the Rights of Man. Hugo comments on the Rights of Man society in the novel, describing the many spin-off sub-groups in Paris and elsewhere:

The Society of the Rights of Man engendered the Society of Action. These were impatient individuals who broke away and hastened ahead. Other associations sought to recruit [for] themselves from the great mother societies .... Then the Society of Equal Workingmen which was divided into three fractions, the levellers, the communists, the reformers. Then the Army of the Bastilles, a sort of cohort organized on a military footing .... The central committee, which was at the head, had two arms, the Society of Action, and the Army of the Bastilles .... A legitimist association, the Chevaliers of Fidelity, stirred about among these the republican affiliations. It was denounced and repudiated there .... In Paris, the Faubourg Saint-Marceau kept up an equal buzzing with the Faubourg Saint-Antoine, and the schools were no less moved than the faubourgs. A cafe in the Rue Saint-Hyacinthe and the wine shop of the Seven Billiards, Rue des Mathurins-Saint-Jacques, served as rallying points for the students. The Society of the Friends of the A B C affiliated to the Mutualists of Angers, and to the Cougourde of Aix, met, as we have seen, in the Cafe Musain.

== Members ==
- Bahorel – An idler from a peasant background who connects the Friends of the ABC with similar societies. He is described as having "daring waistcoats and scarlet opinions". Bahorel is a student in his eleventh year at the time of his introduction, though he does not care for the law school. His motto is "never a lawyer". On the way to build a barricade in the June Rebellion, Bahorel gains the attention of Gavroche due to his bold behavior. He is the first of the principal Friends of the ABC to die in the revolt and is killed by a municipal guardsman.
- Combeferre – "The Guide". Representing the philosophy of the revolution, he "completes and corrects" Enjolras. An intellectual, Combeferre advocates for societal and scientific progress. In contrast to Enjolras, whom one "would have liked to fight under", it is mentioned that one would prefer to "march behind" him. At the barricade, Combeferre is killed by bayonet while assisting a wounded soldier, and was able to do no more than look up to the sky before he died.
- Courfeyrac (also de Courfeyrac) – "The Center". Courfeyrac is compared with Tholomyes, Fantine's lover featured earlier in the novel; however, contrary to Tholomyes, Courfeyrac is honorable and loyal. Alongside Combeferre "The Guide" and Enjolras "The Chief", Courfeyrac is described as "The Center" on account of his warm and radiant personality. He is Marius Pontmercy's closest companion. He dies defending the center of the barricade.
- Enjolras – "The Chief". Youthful, handsome, and charming, though "capable of being terrible", he is the leader of the Friends of the ABC. A "priest of the ideal", Enjolras is devoted to the revolution and his republican ideals. He is a skilled combatant during the June Rebellion, facing a battalion of the National Guard alone, but he sustains no wounds or injuries prior to his death. Enjolras is killed by firing squad in the Corinthe, holding hands with Grantaire.
- Feuilly – An orphaned fan maker who taught himself to read and write. He has great interest in foreign affairs and history, and he is described to have "adopted the people". He has a particular interest for Poland (where the recent November Uprising had been crushed by the Russians), shouting "Long live Poland!" while marching to the barricades. He is the only workingman among the named members of the Friends of the ABC. Feuilly is revered by Enjolras, and he dies on the barricade in the June Rebellion.
- Grantaire – A skeptic with no interest in revolution. Grantaire is involved with the Friends of the ABC due to his friendship with its members and his admiration, veneration and love for Enjolras, who disdains him for his skepticism and drunkenness. He is noted to be ugly and a heavy drinker, and he sleeps through most of the fighting in the June Rebellion. Despite this, he eventually declares himself to be one of the insurgents and dies alongside Enjolras, hand in hand.
- Jean Prouvaire (also Jehan) – Described as softer than Combeferre, romantic man, Jean Prouvaire is a poet who calls himself Jehan due to his interest in the Middle Ages. He has knowledge of Italian, Latin, Greek, and Hebrew, and his interest in poetry is grand. Though he is timid and quiet, he is intrepid, and good above all. Shortly after the first assault on the barricade, Jean Prouvaire is found to be missing among the insurgents. Combeferre and Enjolras realize that he is taken prisoner, but before they can attempt a truce, they recognize the sound of his voice from the end of the street. After they hear the sound of gunfire, they determine that Prouvaire is killed.
- Joly (also Jolllly) – A hypochondriac student of medicine. Joly is described as the happiest of all of the Friends despite his eccentricity and hypochondria. He is called "Jolllly" with four Ls, a pun on the English word jolly. He has the habit of touching his nose with the tip of his cane, which shows he has a sagacious mind. The morning of 5 June, Joly dines with Lesgle and Grantaire before joining his fellows in building the barricade, despite having a cold. Joly dies alongside the other insurgents on the barricade during the June Rebellion.
- Lesgle (also Lègle, Laigle, L'Aigle ['The Eagle'] or Bossuet) – Lesgle is the son of a man who was granted a post-office by Louis XVIII. He is bald at twenty five years old. He lost his inheritance with bad investments. Unlucky but good-humoured, he says often that he lives "under a roof of falling tiles". Lesgle has no home of his own and usually stays with friends, most often Joly. He is the first Friend of the ABC to meet Marius. On the morning of 5 June, he tells Courfeyrac to build a barricade at the Corinthe, where he is dining with Joly and Grantaire, and Courfeyrac agrees. He dies defending it alongside the other insurgents.
