= Cayleigh Capaldi =

American-British singer and actor

Cayleigh Capaldi (born Allen, January 3, 2000) is a vocalist and performer. She is best known for playing the role of Celine Dion and Rose in the musical parody Titanique and for portraying the lead character Sienna in Figaro: an Original Musical in both the US and the UK.

== Career ==
Capaldi was part of the off-Broadway cast of Titanique at the Daryl Roth Theatre in New York in 2022, first in the ensemble and then in the lead roles of Celine Dion and Rose. The show transferred from the Asylum Theatre Off-Broadway to the Daryl Roth in November 2022. She later joined the West End production in May 2025 for a limited engagement as an understudy for Celine and Rose and is set to leave in June 2025.

From May to October 2024 Capaldi played the role of Elsa in the first regional production of Frozen at the Tuacahn Theatre in Utah.

In February 2025 she reprised the role of Sienna in the new musical Figaro, written by Ashley Jana and Will Nunziata. The show played at the London Palladium for two nights only and cast also included Aimie Atkinson as Lucia and Jon Robyns as Figaro. Capaldi also led the original concept album of the show, which marks her West End debut.

=== Stage ===
Year	Title	Role	Theatre	Category
2023	Putting it Together	Woman 2	Pioneer Memorial Theatre	
2023-2024	Titanique	Background vocalist Celine Dion/Rose Understudy	Daryl Roth Theatre	
2024	Frozen	Elsa	Tuacahn Theatre	
2024	Anastasia	Tsarina Alexandra	Tuacahn Theatre	
2024	Jersey Boys	Lorraine	Tuacahn Theatre	
2025	Figaro: an Original Musical	Sienna	London Palladium	West End
2025	Titanique	Celine Dion/Rose Understudy	Criterion Theatre	West End
2025	The Sound of Music	Maria	US Tour	US Tour

== Filmography ==
=== Film ===
Year	Title	Role	Notes
2020	Spare	Homeless woman	Short
2020	Why are you here?	Laila	Short
2022	You & You	Girl	Short
2022	The Trail	She	Short

=== Television ===
Year	Title	Role	Notes
2015	Hangzhou Global Tour	Self - Host	TV series (19 episodes)
2019	Mrs Fletcher	College student/ Principal vocalist	Mini Series (1 episode)
2022	Law & Order	Victoria Cartwright	TV Series (1 episode)

== Personal life ==
Capaldi's parents are American actress, dancer and singer Leigh Zimmerman and Scottish singer Domenick Allen. The performer has a dual American/British nationality.
