= Stephen Sondheim's Old Friends =

Concert honouring Broadway musical theatre composer and lyricist Stephen Sondheim

- West End Promotional Poster
- Music: Stephen Sondheim; Leonard Bernstein; Jule Styne; Mary Rodgers
- Lyrics: Stephen Sondheim
- Premiere: 3 May 2022: Sondheim Theatre, London
- Productions: 2022 Gala Performance; 2023 West End; 2025 Los Angeles; 2025 Broadway

Stephen Sondheim's Old Friends is a tribute revue honoring musical theatre composer and lyricist Stephen Sondheim devised and produced by Cameron Mackintosh.

Originally designed as a one-night performance, the revue premiered at the Sondheim Theatre in London on 3 May 2022. Over a year later, Mackintosh began producing a limited West End run. This run began previews on 21 September 2023 and opened on 3 October at the Gielgud Theatre.

== Background ==
The idea for the concert came about during the COVID-19 pandemic lockdown where Sondheim suggested to Mackintosh a follow-up of their revue productions Side by Side by Sondheim and Putting It Together. During the development of the concert, Sondheim died in November 2021.

== Productions ==
=== Gala Performance (2022) ===
The concert was announced to be performed for one night only on 3 May 2022 at the Sondheim Theatre in London's West End. It was staged by Matthew Bourne and Maria Friedman with a 26-piece orchestra conducted by Alfonso Casado Trigo. The line-up included Michael Ball, Petula Clark, Judi Dench, Daniel Evans, Bonnie Langford, Damian Lewis, Julia McKenzie, Bernadette Peters, Clive Rowe and Imelda Staunton. The concert sold out immediately and was simultaneously live screened at the Prince Edward Theatre and later broadcast on BBC Two on 31 December 2022. On 12 February 2023, the concert won the WhatsOnStage Award for Best Theatre Event.

=== West End (2023) ===
At the 2023 WhatsOnStage Awards, Mackintosh announced that the revue would return for a 16-week run at the Gielgud Theatre from 16 September 2023 until 6 January 2024, starring Bernadette Peters and Lea Salonga. Peters, Janie Dee, Bonnie Langford, and Jeremy Secomb returned, and were joined by Salonga, Joanna Riding, Jac Yarrow, Gavin Lee, and Christine Allado. On 7 September 2023, it was announced that the show's first preview had been postponed due to the withdrawal of Haydn Gwynne, who later died in October. On 12 September 2023, it was announced that Clare Burt had joined the production as Gwynne's replacement. The production, staged and directed by Matthew Bourne and Julia McKenzie, choreographed by Stephen Mear, conducted by Alfonso Casado Trigo, musical supervision by Stephen Brooker, musical arrangements by Stephen Metcalfe, set design by Matt Kinley, projection design by George Reeve, lighting design by Warren Letton, and sound design by Mick Potter, began previews on 21 September and officially opened on 3 October.

=== Los Angeles (2025) ===
The show had its North American premiere in Los Angeles. The show began performances on 8 February 2025 at the Ahmanson Theatre with an official opening on 13 February. The engagement ran through 9 March. Bernadette Peters and Lea Salonga reprised their performances from London. The rest of the cast was announced in October 2024 and included Beth Leavel, Gavin Lee, Ryan McCartan, Jasmine Forsberg, Kate Jennings Grant, David Harris, Bonnie Langford, Jason Pennycooke, Joanna Riding, Jeremy Secomb,[Maria Wirries, Daniel Yearwood, Kevin Earley, Paige Faure, Alexa Lopez, and Peter Neureuther. In November 2024, it was announced McCartan would no longer perform in the production and would instead replace Jeremy Jordan in The Great Gatsby on Broadway. On 16 January, it was announced Kyle Selig and Jacob Dickey joined the cast.

=== Broadway (2025) ===
Following the run in Los Angeles, the show transferred to Broadway in 2025 with Bernadette Peters and Lea Salonga and the rest of the Los Angeles cast reprising their performances. The show began performances on 25 March 2025 at the Samuel J. Friedman Theatre with an opening night on 8 April and closed 29 June.

== Cast ==
London Gala	West End	Los Angeles	Broadway
2022	2023	2025	
Bernadette Peters
Maria Friedman	Lea Salonga		
Michael Ball	Christine Allado	Beth Leavel	
Helena Bonham Carter	Clare Burt	Jasmine Forsberg	
Janie Dee		Kate Jennings Grant	
Rob Brydon	Damian Humbley	David Harris	Greg Mills
Petula Clark	Bradley Jaden	Kyle Selig	
Bonnie Langford
Anna-Jane Casey	Gavin Lee		
Judi Dench	Jason Pennycooke		
Hadyn Gwynne	Joanna Riding		
Rosalie Craig	Jeremy Secomb		
Damian Lewis	Jac Yarrow	Kevin Earley	
Julia McKenzie	Marley Fenton	Maria Wirries	
Julian Ovenden	Beatrice Penny-Touré	Paige Faure	
Daniel Evans	Harry Apps	Daniel Yearwood	
Siân Phillips	Bella Brown	Alexa Lopez	
Jon Robyns	Richard Dempsey	Peter Neureuther	
Clive Rowe	Monique Young	Jacob Dickey	
Jenna Russell	—N/a		Scarlett Strallen
Imelda Staunton	—N/a		
Charlie Stemp	—N/a		
Gary Wilmot	—N/a		
Michael D. Xavier	—N/a		

== Musical numbers ==
=== 2022 Gala Performance ===
Act I

- Opening: "Sunday in the Park with George" – Daniel Evans / "Side by Side" – Ashley Campbell, Rosalie Craig, Josefina Gabrielle, Amy Griffiths, Bradley Jaden, Julia McKenzie and Jenna Russell
- "Introduction" – Cameron Mackintosh
- "Comedy Tonight"– Rob Brydon, Clive Rowe, Gary Wilmot and West End All Stars
- "Company" – West End All Stars
- "The Little Things You Do Together" – Rob Brydon and Haydn Gwynne
- "You Could Drive a Person Crazy" – Anna-Jane Casey, Janie Dee, Josefina Gabrielle
- "Live Alone and Like It" – Clive Rowe
- "Loving You" – Michael Ball
- "Getting Married Today" – Anna-Jane Casey, Holly-Anne Hull and Jon Robyns
- "Into the Woods" – West End All Stars
- "Agony" – Julian Ovenden and Michael Xavier
- "I Know Things Now" – Bernadette Peters
- "Hello Little Girl" – Damian Lewis and Bernadette Peters
- "Children Will Listen" – Bernadette Peters
- "A Weekend in the Country" – Desmonda Cathabel, Janie Dee, Rob Houchen, Holly-Anne Hull, Julian Ovenden, Michael Xavier and West End All Stars
- "Send in the Clowns" – Judi Dench
- "The Ballad of Sweeney Todd" – Michael Ball and West End All Stars
- "The Worst Pies in London" – Michael Ball and Maria Friedman
- "My Friends" – Michael Ball
- "Pretty Women" – Michael Ball and Jeremy Secomb
- "A Little Priest" – Michael Ball and Maria Friedman
- "The Ladies Who Lunch" – Haydn Gwynne
- "Sunday" – Daniel Evans, Bernadette Peters and West End All Stars

Act II

- "Entr’acte" – Overture from Merrily We Roll Along – The Orchestra
- "Tonight Quintet" – Shan Ako, Christine Allado, Louis Gaunt, Rob Houchen and Students from the Royal Academy Musical Theatre Company and Mountview
- "Broadway Baby" – Helena Bonham Carter, Rosalie Craig, Maria Friedman, Josefina Gabrielle, Amy Griffiths, Haydn Gwynne, Bonnie Langford, Julia McKenzie, Bernadette Peters, Jenna Russell and Gary Wilmot
- "Everybody Ought to Have a Maid" – Rob Brydon, Damian Lewis, Julian Ovenden and Siân Phillips
- "You Gotta Get A Gimmick" – Anna-Jane Casey, Bonnie Langford and Bernadette Peters
- "Waiting For The Girls Upstairs" – Ashley Campbell, Rob Houchen, Bradley Jaden and Charlie Stemp
- "I’m Still Here" – Petula Clark
- "Could I Leave You?" – Michael Ball
- "Buddy’s Blues" – Gary Wilmot
- "The Boy From..." – Janie Dee
- "Losing My Mind" – Bernadette Peters
- "Everything’s Coming Up Roses" – Imelda Staunton
- "Duelling Composers" - Stephen Sondheim and Andrew Lloyd Webber (video segment)
- "Not A Day Goes By" – Michael Ball, Rosalie Craig, Maria Friedman, Julia McKenzie, Bernadette Peters, Jenna Russell and West End All Stars
- "Being Alive" – Michael Ball, Rob Brydon, Rosalie Craig, Haydn Gwynne, Bradley Jaden, Bonnie Langford, Julian Ovenden, Jon Robyns, Jenna Russell, Jeremy Secomb, Michael Xavier and West End All Stars
- "Old Friends" – Full Company
- "Our Time" – Full Company

== Awards and nominations ==
=== 2025 Broadway production ===
Year	Award	Category	Nominee	Result
2025	Drama League Awards	Outstanding Production of a Musical		Nominated
2025	Drama League Awards	Distinguished Performance	Beth Leavel	Nominated
2025	Drama League Awards	Distinguished Performance	Lea Salonga	Nominated
2025	Drama Desk Awards	Outstanding Sound Design of a Musical	Mick Potter	Nominated
