= Bradley Jaden =

English actor (born 1988)

- Jaden in 2026
- Born: 25 March 1987 (age 39)
- Education: Guildford School of Acting
- Occupations: Actor and singer
- Years active: 2008–present
- Known for: Les Misérables
- Television: EastEnders
- Height: 1.8 m (5 ft 11 in)
- Spouse: Olivia Kate Holding (m. 2023; div. 2025)
- Partners: Amy Walsh (2014-2018); Rachel Zegler (2026-present)

Bradley Jaden (born Bradley Wilson, 25 March 1987) is an English actor. His West End credits include the leading roles of Javert and Enjolras in Les Misérables, Fiyero in Wicked, and Lancelot in Camelot. After opening his first West End show in Shrek: The Musical, he performed in his first theater festival as Jack Joliet Blue in The Blues Brothers, his touring production debut in Ghost: The Musical, was cast in his first screen role in the soap opera EastEnders. In October 2026, he began previews for his Broadway debut as Jesse in Wanted: The Legend of the Sisters Clarke, before opening the show on November 8 of that year.

Jaden also understudied the title role in Shrek the Musical and Jean Valjean in Les Mis.. He starred as Raoul in the Italian premiere of The Phantom of the Opera. He reprised the role of Inspector Javert in Les Misérables: The Arena Spectacular World Tour.

As of 2026, he has held the role of Inspector Javert in 10 separate stints and Enjolras for 4 respectively, spanning over a decade in Les Miserables, both in the West End and on various International Tours.

== Career ==
In 2011, Jaden made his West End debut in Shrek the Musical understudying the titular role and playing Papa Bear.

In 2014, he made his Les Mis debut playing Lesgles and understudying the role of Enjolras and Jean Valjean. He would later takeover the role of Enjolras for the show's 30th anniversary.

In 2016, Jaden joined the international tour cast of Wicked playing the role of Fiyero. He later reprised the role in the West End production in both 2016 and 2017.

In 2018, Jaden rejoined Les Mis playing the role of Javert, making him the last actor to play the role in the Queen's Theatre. He reprised his role of Enjolras in the Gielgud Theatre's Les Misérables: The Staged Concert in 2019. He would then take over the role of Javert from Michael Ball and continue with the role in the Sondheim Theatre production before leaving the cast in September 2022. He rejoined the cast for two weeks in January 2024.

In 2022, Jaden played Sir Lancelot in Camelot opposite Ramin Karimloo and Lucy St. Louis at the London Palladium.

Starting 31 January 2023, he made his small screen debut portraying Jed, Sonia Fowler's lodger in seven episodes of the television soap opera EastEnders.

In June 2023, it was announced Jaden would play Raoul, Vicomte de Chagny in the Italian premiere of The Phantom of the Opera opposite Karimloo as the Phantom and Earl Carpenter as Monsieur André. Then in September 2023, Jaden joined Broadway legends Bernadette Peters and Lea Salonga in the cast of Stephen Sondheim's Old Friends for a limited 16-week season at the Gielgud Theatre. He made his United States performance debut in June 2024, he brought his own concert show to New York City at Sony Hall.

In Autumn 2024, he reprised the role of Javert in Les Misérables: The Arena Spectacular World Tour. He shared the role with Michael Ball and performed opposite Alfie Boe, Killian Donnelly, Gerónimo Rauch, and Peter Joback as Valjean. Jaden performed the role in the UK, Australia, Taiwan, Sweden, Japan, Ireland, the Netherlands, Italy, Luxembourg, Switzerland, Norway, Denmark, the United Arab Emirates, the Royal Albert Hall, and Radio City Music Hall in New York City.

In 2026, he starred as Billy Flynn in the Japanese Premiere of Chicago, before being announced to make his Broadway debut.

== Personal Life ==
From 2016-2018, Jaden was in a relationship with Amy Walsh. As of late 2026, Jaden is in a relationship with actress Rachel Zegler. During the coronavirus pandemic, Jaden joined Matt Lucas to raise money for the FeedNHS campaign.

== Acting Credits ==
=== Theatre ===
Year(s)	Production	Role	Theatre	Location
2008	Peter Pan: A Musical Adventure	Cecco	West Yorkshire Playhouse	Leeds
2009	The Blues Brothers	Jack Joliet Blue	Edinburgh Festival	Edinburgh
2011–2013	Shrek the Musical	Papa Bear / Dragon Puppeteer u/s Shrek u/s Papa Ogre	Theatre Royal, Drury Lane	West End
2013–2014	Ghost: The Musical	Ensemble u/s Sam u/s Carl	—N/a	UK National Tour
2014–2015	Les Misérables	Lesgles u/s Jean Valjean u/s Enjolras	Queen's Theatre	West End
2015–2016	Les Misérables	Enjolras	Queen's Theatre	West End
2016	My Fair Lady	Freddy Eynsford-Hill	St Paul's Church	London
2016–2017	Wicked	Fiyero Tigelaar	—N/a	International Tour
2017	Wicked	Fiyero Tigelaar	Apollo Victoria Theatre	West End
2017	South Pacific	Lt. Joseph Cable, USMC	Cadogan Hall	London
2017–2018	Wicked	Fiyero Tigelaar	Apollo Victoria Theatre	West End
2018–2019	Les Misérables	Javert	Queen's Theatre	West End
2019	Les Misérables	Enjolras	Gielgud Theatre	West End
2019–2020	Les Misérables	Javert	Sondheim Theatre	West End
2020	Les Misérables	Enjolras u/s Javert	Sondheim Theatre	West End
2021	Les Misérables	Javert	Sondheim Theatre	West End
2021	Treason The Musical	Thomas Percy	Cadogan Hall	London
2021	Les Misérables	Javert	Sondheim Theatre	West End
2021	Les Misérables	Emergency Enjolras	Sondheim Theatre	West End
2021–2022	Les Misérables	Javert	Sondheim Theatre	West End
2022	Camelot	Sir Lancelot du Lac	London Palladium	West End
2022	Treason The Musical	Thomas Percy	Theatre Royal, Drury Lane	West End
2022–2023	Les Misérables	Javert	Sondheim Theatre	West End
2023	The Phantom of the Opera	Raoul, Vicomte de Chagny	Politeama Rossetti	Trieste, Italy
2023–2024	Stephen Sondheim's Old Friends	Featured Performer	Gielgud Theatre	West End
2024	Les Misérables	Javert	Sondheim Theatre	West End
2024	Side Show	Terry Connor	London Palladium	West End
2024–2025	Les Misérables	Javert	-	International tour
2025	Les Misérables	Javert	Sondheim Theatre	West End
2026	Les Misérables	Javert	-	International tour
2026	Chicago	Billy Flynn	Tokyu Theatre Orb	Tokyo, Japan
2026	Chicago	Billy Flynn	Oryx Theatre	Osaka, Japan
2026	Wanted: The Legend of the Sisters Clarke	Jesse Whitewater	James Earl Jones Theatre	Broadway

=== Filmography ===
Year	Production	Role	Notes
2019	Les Misérables: The Staged Concert	Enjolras	
2020	Britain's Got Talent	Enjolras	Part of The Shows Must Go On
2022	Stephen Sondheim's Old Friends	Featured Performer	Gala Performance
2023	EastEnders	Jed	

=== Discography ===
Year	Title	Album
2020	Do You Hear the People Sing? - Live	Les Misérables: The Staged Concert
2024	Being Alive (From "Company") - Single	Non album single
2024	Stars (From "Les Misérables") - Single	Non album single
2024	Who I'd Be (From"Shrek the Musical")	Bradley Jaden Recorded Live in London
2024	If I Can't Love Her (From "Beauty and the Beast")	Bradley Jaden Recorded Live in London
2024	Wondering (From "Bridges of Madison County")	Bradley Jaden Recorded Live in London
2024	Fall on Me (From "Nutcracker and the Four Realms")	Bradley Jaden Recorded Live in London
2024	On the Street Where You Live (From "My Fair Lady")	Bradley Jaden Recorded Live in London
2024	The Impossible Dream (From "Man of La Mancha")	Bradley Jaden Recorded Live in London
2024	Sway	Bradley Jaden Recorded Live in London
2024	Your Eyes (From "Rent" )	Bradley Jaden Recorded Live in London
2024	As Long As You're Mine (From "Wicked")	Bradley Jaden Recorded Live in London
2024	Blind Faith (From "Treason: The Musical")	Bradley Jaden Recorded Live in London
2024	Music of the Night (From "Phantom of the Opera")	Bradley Jaden Recorded Live in London
2024	Being Alive (From "Company") - Album Version	Bradley Jaden Recorded Live in London
2024	Stars (From "Les Misérables") - Album version	Bradley Jaden Recorded Live in London
