= Confession room =

Confession room may refer to:

- The Confession Room, a 2014 British musical comedy
- Confessional, an enclosed space for confessing to a priest in Catholic and some Protestant churches, also known as a confession room
- Confession room, a feature in some reality television shows
