= Michelle Gomez =

Scottish actress (born 1966)

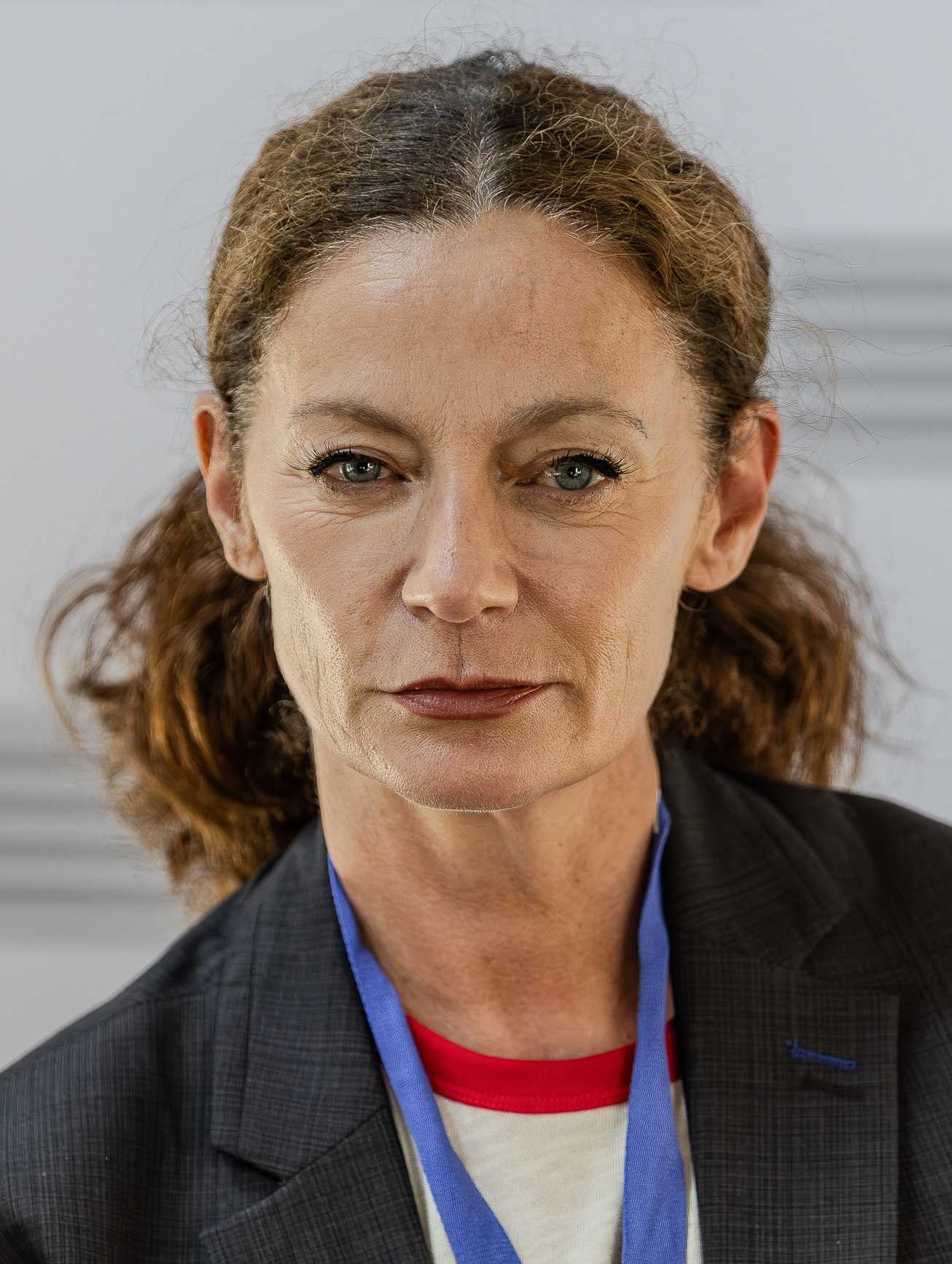
- Gomez at the Edinburgh International Book Festival, August 2025
- Born: Michelle May R. Gomez; 23 November 1966 (age 59); Glasgow, Scotland
- Citizenship: United Kingdom; United States (since 2023)
- Education: Royal Conservatoire of Scotland
- Occupation: Actress
- Years active: 1988–present
- Spouse: Jack Davenport (m. 2000)
- Children: 1
- Relatives: Nigel Davenport (father-in-law); Maria Aitken (mother-in-law)

Michelle May R. Gomez (born 23 November 1966) is a Scottish actress. She gained recognition for her roles in the comedy series The Book Group (2002–2003), Green Wing (2004–2007), and Bad Education (2012–2013). She went on to appear as Missy in the long-running British science fiction series Doctor Who (2014–2015, 2017), for which she was nominated for the BAFTA TV Award for Best Supporting Actress.

Gomez received further recognition and acclaim for her roles as Lilith / Madam Satan and Mary Wardwell in the Netflix supernatural horror series Chilling Adventures of Sabrina (2018–2020) and as Miranda Croft in the HBO Max dark comedy thriller series The Flight Attendant (2020–2022).

== Early life ==
Gomez was born on 23 November 1966 in Glasgow to Tony and May Gomez. Her father is originally from Montserrat and is of Portuguese descent. He was a photographer. Her mother ran a modeling agency.

From the moment she saw a production of Kiss Me, Kate at the age of seven, Gomez wanted to be an actress, which her parents encouraged. She attended Shawlands Academy from 1978 to 1983 and trained at the Royal Scottish Academy of Music and Drama.

== Career ==
Gomez's first major role was in the 1998 film The Acid House, based on three Irvine Welsh short stories. She went on to star in the cult Channel 4 comedy drama The Book Group before landing her role as staff liaison officer Sue White in the Channel 4 comedy Green Wing. She played Michelle in Carrie and Barry for the BBC, and starred as PC Sally Bobbins in the BBC 2 sitcom Feel the Force. She also appeared in Gunslinger's Revenge.

In 2005, Gomez appeared in the film Chromophobia. In 2006, she starred in the film The Good Housekeeping Guide. In 2007 she starred in a drama by Irvine Welsh and Dean Cavanagh called Wedding Belles, and starred in Boeing-Boeing at the Comedy Theatre in London. Also in 2007, she guest-starred in the Doctor Who audio play Valhalla. In 2008 she joined the Royal Shakespeare Company, and performed as Kate in The Taming of the Shrew at the Courtyard Theatre and the Novello Theatre.

In 2012, Gomez starred in the British film The Wedding Video, portraying the psychologically unstable wedding planner. In the same year, she appeared in the British comedy series Bad Education, portraying the deputy-head Isobel Pickwell, which returned for a second series in 2013. In 2014, she began producing comedy sketches as "Heather" an agony aunt for YouTube channel Wildseed Studios.

She had a recurring role in series 8–10 of Doctor Who as a character called Missy. Her true identity was revealed in the series 8 two-part finale "Dark Water" / "Death in Heaven" as an incarnation of the Master, the Doctor's longstanding nemesis (Missy being a shortened form of Mistress, the female equivalent of Master). Gomez reprised the role in the opening two-part story of the ninth series "The Magician's Apprentice" / "The Witch's Familiar" and again in the show's tenth series, which began broadcasting in April 2017. In May 2017, Gomez stated that it would be her last series in the role.

Gomez's portrayal of Missy earned her a nomination for the Best Actress (Television) award at the 2015 British Academy Scotland Awards. Later, Gomez also received a nod as Best Supporting Actress at the British Academy Television Awards.

In 2018, Gomez was cast as Lilith / Madam Satan and Mary Wardwell in the Netflix series Chilling Adventures of Sabrina. She later appeared as Miranda Croft in the HBO Max dark comedy thriller series The Flight Attendant in November 2020. The show was later renewed for a second season, which premiered on April 21, 2022.

In 2021, Gomez was cast in season 3 of Doom Patrol as Madame Rouge. She also provided the voice of Morag in The Loud House Movie.

In August 2025, it was announced that Gomez would be voicing Professor McGonagall in Harry Potter: The Full-Cast Audio Editions, a production of Audible and J.K. Rowling's Pottermore. This was met with controversy, due to Rowling's advocacy against transgender rights and her financial donations to anti-trans causes, with criticism centering on the financial support that taking part in the audiobook would give to Rowling. In response, Gomez stated that "I stand with trans people, and I support trans rights - fully and without hesitation" and linked a donation page for Callen-Lorde Community Health Center.

== Personal life ==
Gomez has been married to actor Jack Davenport since 1 May 2000. She gave birth to their son in 2010 and live in Great Barrington, Massachusetts, having previously resided in New York City. On 28 February 2023, Gomez announced on Instagram that she, Davenport, and their son had become naturalised American citizens.

== Filmography ==
=== Film ===
Year	Title	Role	Notes
1998	The Acid House	Catriona	Segment: A Soft Touch
1998	Gunslinger's Revenge	Leather Girl	
1999	New World Disorder	Annika "Amethyst" Rains	
1999	The Escort	Hostess	
1999	Ticks	Stressed Girl on Phone	Short film
2000	Offending Angels	Baggy's Ex-Girlfriend	
2001	Subterrain	Unknown	
2005	Chromophobia	Bushey	
2005	Meat the Campbells	Mrs. Campbell	Short film
2012	The Wedding Video	Jenna (The Wedding Planner)	
2021	The Loud House Movie	Morag (voice)	
2025	Zootopia 2	Captain Hoggbottom (voice)	
2026	The Incomer	Rose	

=== Television ===
Year	Title	Role	Notes
1989	First and Last	Nurse	Television film
1992	Taggart	Hairdresser	Episode: "Nest of Vipers"
1996	The Bill	Penny Grice	Episode: "Toe the Line"
1998	The Bill	Carrie Bennett	Episode: "Dog Eat Dog"
1999	Taggart	Harriet Bailes	Episode: "Bloodlines"
1999	Highlander: The Raven	Talia Bauer	Episode: "Inferno"
2001	Rebus	Caro Rattray	Episode: "Mortal Causes"
2002	My Family	Sharon	Episode: "The Second Greatest Story Ever Told"
2002–2003	The Book Group	Janice McCann	12 episodes
2003	Ready When You Are, Mr. McGill	Judy	Television film
2003	Manchild	Kitty	Episode: "#2.2"
2005	Murder in Suburbia	Anita Green	Episode: "Death of an Estate Agent"
2004–2005	Carrie and Barry	Michelle	12 episodes
2004–2007	Green Wing	Sue White	18 episodes
2006	Feel the Force	Sally Bobbins	6 episodes
2006	The Good Housekeeping Guide	Jenny	Television film
2006	Secret Policeman's Ball sketch	Sue White	Television special
2007	Oliver Twist	Mrs. Sowerberry	2 episodes
2007	Wedding Belles	Amanda	Television film
2009	Svengali	Francine Hardy	Television film
2012–2013	Bad Education	Isobel Pickwell	11 episodes
2013	Playhouse Presents	Mary, Queen of Scots	6 episodes
2014–2015, 2017	Doctor Who	Missy	15 episodes
2015	The Brink	Vanessa	3 episodes
2015	Gotham	The Lady	2 episodes
2016	The Collection	Eliette Malet	2 episodes
2018–2020	Chilling Adventures of Sabrina	Lilith / Madam Satan / Mary Wardwell	36 episodes
2020	101 Dalmatian Street	Cruella de Vil (voice)	4 episodes
2020–2022	The Flight Attendant	Miranda Croft	Main role Nominated — Screen Actors Guild Award for Outstanding Performance by an Ensemble in a Comedy Series
2020	DuckTales	Matilda McDuck (voice)	Episode: "The Fight for Castle McDuck!"
2021–2023	Doom Patrol	Laura De Mille / Madame Rouge	20 episodes
2023	Law & Order: Special Victims Unit	Connie Parrish	Guest Star

=== Audio drama ===
Year	Title		Role	Notes
2007	Doctor Who: The Monthly Adventures	Episode: "Valhalla"	Jevvan	
2019	Missy: Series One		Missy	
2019	The Diary of River Song: Series 5	Episode: "The Bekdel Test"	Missy	
2019	Doctor Who: Ravenous	Episodes: "Day of the Master Part One" & "Day of the Master Part Two"	Missy	
2020	Missy: Series Two		Missy	
2021	Masterful		Missy	Special release marking 50 years of the character of the Master
2021	Missy: Missy and the Monk		Missy	
2023	The Eighth of March: Strange Chemistry	Episode: "Fairies at the Bottom of the Garden"	Missy	Special release for International Women's Day, featuring the women of the Whoniverse
2023	UNIT Nemesis: Masters of Time	Episode: "True Nemesis"	Missy	
2023	Doctor Who: Once and Future	Episode "The Martian Invasion of Planetoid 50"	Missy	A special series marking 60 years of Doctor Who
2024	Missy: Bad Influence		Missy	
2025	Dark Gallifrey	"Missy"	Missy	Gomez's Missy will have a trilogy in the forthcoming series

=== Video games ===
Year	Title	Voice role	Notes
2015	Lego Dimensions	Missy	
2018	Doctor Who Infinity	Missy	
2024	Dragon Age: The Veilguard	Ghilan'nain	

== Notes ==
- Leask, Anjie (19 April 2002). "When I said the C word on stage I felt like a rock star". The Mirror. London, England: MGN LTD. Archived from the original on 22 October 2012 – via HighBeam Research.
- Fulton, Rick (3 September 2004). "Our Secret Star: Book Group Michelle is going to be huge thanks to TWO shows". Daily Record. Glasgow, Scotland. Archived from the original on 23 October 2012 – via HighBeam Research.
- English, Paul (4 June 2005). "Green and bear it". Daily Record. Glasgow, Scotland: Scottish Daily Record & Sunday. Archived from the original on 23 October 2012 – via HighBeam Research.
- Allan, Vicky (19 March 2006). "Ready, steady, Gomez. A fine comedic actress, she scored a direct hit". THE Sunday Herald.
- Rampton, James (5 May 2006). "Michelle Gomez is a force to be reckoned with". The Scotsman.
- Cadwalladr, Carole (25 March 2007). "Funny girl". The Observer. Guardian News and Media Limited.
- Fisher, Mark (20 April 2008). "Curtain call for a shrew operator – Michelle Gomez interview". The Scotsman.
- Brown, Helen (30 May 2008). "Michelle Gomez: 'I'm shameless, Desperate!'". Daily Telegraph. Telegraph Media Group Limited.
- Bearn, Emily (12 January 2009). "Funny Face: Michelle Gomez". Evening Standard Magazine. Associated Newspapers. Archived from the original on 17 January 2009.
- "Michelle Gomez". biogs.com. Danny Rosenbaum.
