= Van Dean =

Theatre and Film Producer

Van Dean (born August 1974) is a Tony Award and Grammy Award winning producer and the Founder and President of Van Dean Productions, LLC. His work as a producer spans Broadway, Off-Broadway, national tours, concerts, films, and benefit projects. He is the Founder and President of Center Stage Records.

== Education and Early Career ==
Van grew up in Trumbull, CT and attended Trumbull High School. He earned his B.S. in Producing for Electronic Media from the S.I. Newhouse School of Public Communications at Syracuse University. Following graduation, he worked as a programmer for a decade before entering the entertainment industry in 2005. He produced his first two shows, The Mistress Cycle and Saint Heaven, under the banner of his first production company, Van Hill Entertainment, with then producing partner, Hillary Cutter. Van produced his first Off-Broadway show, ROOMS: A Rock Romance, in 2009 and his first Broadway show, Catch Me if You Can, in 2010.

== Productions ==
- The Gershwins' Porgy and Bess
- Anastasia (Broadway and National Tour)
- Jagged Little Pill (Broadway and National Tour)
- How to Dance in Ohio (Broadway)
- Cabaret (Broadway)
- Rodgers and Hammerstein's Cinderella (Broadway and National Tour)
- The Lightning Thief: The Percy Jackson Musical (Broadway and National Tour)
- Matilda (Broadway and National Tour)
- Evita (Broadway)
- The Best Man (Broadway)
- Catch Me If You Can (Broadway)
- The Velocity of Autumn (Broadway)
- Big Fish (Broadway)
- Bonnie & Clyde (Broadway and West End)
- Chinglish (Broadway)
- You're a Good Man, Charlie Brown (Off-Broadway)
- ROOMS a rock romance (Off-Broadway)
- Master Class with Tyne Daly (National Tour)
- Death Note
- Goodbye New York
- SMASH
- Little Dancer
- Song of Bernadette
- Figaro: An Original Musical

== Filmography ==
- Midsummer in Newtown (Producer)
- From Broadway with Love: A Benefit Concert for Sandy Hook (Producer)
- Broadway Kids Against Bullying: I Have a Voice (Executive Producer)
- Artists for the Arts: With a Little Help from My Friends (Co-Producer)

== Awards and nominations ==
Show	Award	Category	Result
Caroline, Or Change	Grammy Award	Best Musical Theater Album	Nominee
My Fair Lady	Grammy Award	Best Musical Theater Album	Nominee
The Color Purple	Grammy Award	Best Musical Theater Album	Winner
The Gershwins' Porgy and Bess	Tony Award	Best Revival of a Musical	Winner
The Gershwins' Porgy and Bess	Drama Desk Award	Outstanding Revival of a Musical	Nominee
The Gershwins' Porgy and Bess	Drama League Award	Distinguished Revival of a Musical	Nominee
The Gershwins' Porgy and Bess	Outer Critics Circle Award	Outstanding Revival of a Musical	Nominee
Anastasia	Drama Desk Award	Outstanding Musical	Nominee
Anastasia	Drama League Award	Outstanding Production of a Broadway or Off-Broadway Musical	Nominee
Anastasia	Outer Critics Circle Award	Outstanding New Broadway Musical	Nominee
Jagged Little Pill	Tony Award	Best Musical	Nominee
Jagged Little Pill	Drama League Award	Outstanding Production of a Musical	Nominee
Jagged Little Pill	Outer Critics Circle Award	Outstanding New Broadway Musical	Nominee
Rodgers and Hammerstein's Cinderella	Tony Award	Best Revival of a Musical	Nominee
Rodgers and Hammerstein's Cinderella	Drama Desk Award	Outstanding Revival of a Musical	Nominee
Rodgers and Hammerstein's Cinderella	Drama League Award	Outstanding Revival of a Broadway or Off-Broadway Musical	Nominee
Rodgers and Hammerstein's Cinderella	Outer Critics Circle Award	Outstanding Revival of a Musical	Nominee
The Lightning Thief: The Percy Jackson Musical	Lucille Lortel Award	Outstanding Musical	Nominee
The Lightning Thief: The Percy Jackson Musical	Drama Desk Award	Outstanding Musical	Nominee
Matilda	Grammy Award	Best Musical Theater Album	Nominee
Matilda	Tony Award	Best Musical	Nominee
Matilda	Drama League Award	Outstanding Production of a Broadway or Off-Broadway Musical	Nominee
Matilda	Outer Critics Circle Award	Outstanding New Broadway Musical	Nominee
Matilda	Drama Desk Award	Outstanding Musical	Winner
Evita	Tony Award	Best Revival of a Musical	Nominee
Evita	Drama Desk Award	Outstanding Revival of a Musical	Nominee
The Best Man	Drama Desk Award	Outstanding Revival of a Play	Winner
The Best Man	Outer Critics Circle Award	Outstanding Revival of a Play	Winner
The Best Man	Tony Award	Best Revival of a Play	Nominee
Catch Me If You Can	Tony Award	Best Musical	Nominee
Bonnie & Clyde	Drama Desk Award	Outstanding Musical	Nominee
Chinglish	Drama Desk Award	Outstanding Play	Nominee
ROOMS a rock romance	Outer Critics Circle Award	Outstanding New Off-Broadway Musical	Nominee

== Center Stage Records ==
Van founded Center Stage Records in 2024. The label, operating out of New York City and London, releases cast albums from Broadway to the West End, solo albums by major musical theatre artists, and concept albums. Center Stage Records launched with the release of the Original Broadway Cast Recording of How to Dance in Ohio. This release joins the nearly 200 titles brought over from the Broadway Records catalog.

Prior to founding Center Stage Records, Van co-founded Broadway Records in 2012. He was President of the label for 12 years. Among the hundreds of albums released by Broadway Records, Van produced albums including The Color Purple (Grammy Award-winner).

== Benefit Work ==
Van produced From Broadway with Love: A Benefit Concert for Sandy Hook in 2013. The Newtown, CT concert included students from the community and Broadway performers. Funds from the event benefited United Way of Western Connecticut's Sandy Hook School Support Fund. Van was integral in the formation of NewArts (previously the 12.14 Foundation), an organization created in 2013 to provide an artistic community for healing in Newtown, CT. With NewArts, he co-produced local productions of Seussical The Musical, A ROCKIN' Midsummer Night's Dream, and 101 Dalmatians: The Musical. He also collaborated on Liberty Smith, The Lion King Jr, School of Rock (Youth Production), The Wizard of Oz, Newsies, and Matilda. Van co-produced the 2016 feature documentary film, Midsummer in Newtown, in conjunction with A ROCKIN' Midsummer Night's Dream.

In 2018, Van produced From Broadway with Love: A Benefit Concert for Parkland, USA and in 2016, From Broadway with Love: A Benefit Concert for Orlando.

Van was a Producer of "What the World Needs Now is Love," a single to benefit the Orlando community in the wake of the Pulse nightclub tragedy. Broadway Records released the single. Funds were directed to the GLBT Community Center of Central Florida and the Trevor Project.

With Broadway Records, Van released "I Have a Voice," a single to raise awareness about the anti-bullying efforts of www.NoBully.org.

Van also produced the new Broadway United music video of "We are The World" to spread a message of community.

Van is on the board of The Oscar Hammerstein Museum and Theatre Education Center.
