= Figaro: An Original Musical =

- Key art for the 2025 London Palladium production by Bob King Creative
- Music: Ashley Jana
- Lyrics: Ashley Jana
- Book: Ashley Jana
- Productions: 2024 Concept album 2025 London Palladium

Figaro: An Original Musical is an original musical with music, lyrics, and book by Ashley Jana.

Development for the musical was announced in April 2023 when Figaro presented to the Broadway Shark Tank.

== Plot ==
Figaro tells the story of young Sienna, whose dream has always been to sing, but feels trapped in her current life in her father's farm. One day she meets Figaro by chance, and he promises to make all her dreams come true, but at a cost.

== Productions ==
Jana began developing the concept album for the musical in 2021. Jana's 21st-century compositional style, expertise in orchestrations, and masterful music engineering accelerated the concept album to reality by 2024. The concept album was launched in a sold-out show at the Green Room 42 in NYC on March 4, 2024.

Recommended by What's On Stage as a musical theatre concept album to add to your rotation, and Theatermania as one of the "6 Musical Theater Concept Albums You Should Listen To" the album features the talents of Cayleigh Capaldi, Ashley Jana, Mauricio Martínez, Lily Bell Morgan, Benjamin Pajak, T. Oliver Reid (Hadestown), and Jayke Workman.

The album is produced by Ashley Jana, Will Nunziata, Grammy Award & Tony Award-winner Van Dean and Grammy Award & Tony Award nominee Mia Moravis. Andrew Byrnes and Tony Award-winner Michael Lamon are associate producers.

The musical presented two special concert performances at the London Palladium on February 3 & 4, 2025. Casting for the concert includes Aimie Atkinson (Lucia), Jon Robyns (Figaro), Cayleigh Capaldi (Sienna), Coronation Street's Daniel Brocklebank (Antonio), Ava Brennan (Gia), Cian Eagle-Service (Gianni), and Sophia Goodman (Amelia).

== Musical numbers ==
- "Figaro" (prologue)
- "I'll Sing For You"
- "No More"
- "Sienna's Journey"
- "All Our Love"
- "Introducing Figaro"
- "Dreams Come True"
- "No More" (reprise)
- "Too Good To Be True"
- "Something New"
- "Sienna"
- "The Tease"
- "Already Yours"
- "Nothing's as It Seems"
- "All the Money in the World"
- "I've Had Enough of You"
- "Springtime Is Calling"
- "Already Yours" (reprise)
- "I'll Sing for You" (reprise)
- "Sienna" (reprise)
- "The Monster Must Die"
- "Dreams Come True" (reprise)
- "April Showers"
- "Always Changing"
- "I'm on Fire"
- "Sienna's Nightmare"
- "Figaro" (epilogue)
