= Leigh Zimmerman =

American actress, singer and dancer (born 1969)

- Born: March 28, 1969 (age 57); Madison, Wisconsin, U.S.
- Occupations: Actress, singer, dancer
- Years active: 1986–present
- Spouse: Domenick Allen (m. 1993)
- Children: 1

Leigh Zimmerman is an American-British actress, singer and dancer. She has appeared on Broadway in The Will Rogers Follies, Crazy for You and A Funny Thing Happened on the Way to the Forum with Nathan Lane and created the role of Go-To-Hell-Kitty in the 1996 Broadway production of the musical Chicago. Zimmerman is also known for her roles in the London West End productions of The Seven Year Itch, Chicago, as Velma Kelly, Contact, as The Girl in the Yellow Dress, The Producers, originating the role of Ulla and A Chorus Line, as Sheila, for which she won an Olivier Award in 2013.

== Career ==
In 1992, Zimmerman had a minor but memorable role in Home Alone 2: Lost in New York as a fashion model (woman on the street).

In 2002, she was asked to work for the second time with director Susan Stroman to create for the West End the role of The Girl in the Yellow Dress in Contact at the Queens Theatre. During that time, Zimmerman also worked on films such as Proof with Gwyneth Paltrow and Anthony Hopkins, Red Light Runners with Harvey Keitel, The Defender with Dolph Lundgren, and Submerged with Steven Seagal.

In 2004, Zimmerman was asked to play the role of Miriam in the controversial play Three on A Couch by the scientist Carl Djerassi, and worked closely with him to shape the play for the legendary London fringe theatre, The Kings Head. Leigh then starred as Leslie Peters in the television docudrama Small Pox: Silent Weapon for the FX Channel and as Tamsin Reed on BBC's Doctors. Leigh was thrilled when she was asked to create the role of Ulla in London's West End Production of The Producers, and her portrayal earned her an Olivier Award Nomination for Best Leading Actress in 2004.

During her run as Ulla in London from 2004 to 2006, Zimmerman accepted leading roles in several highly acclaimed film and television projects. She played the English double agent, Helen Harlow, alongside Brian Cox, in ITV's The Outsiders. She starred as the Scottish police sergeant, Sergeant Beasley, in the BBC hit comedy Feel the Force. She also had a leading role as the American desperate housewife, Megan, in Ben Elton's comedy series Blessed for the BBC.

In 2006, Zimmerman appeared in feature films, such as United 93 directed by Paul Greengrass, where she portrayed Christine Snyder. She spoke fluent Spanish as the gothic siren, Irene, in the Spanish Film, La Luna en Botella (Moon in a Bottle). Zimmerman also stars as the California love guru, Candy Connor, in the British independent film, Are You Ready For Love.

== Filmography ==
=== Film ===
Year	Title	Role	Notes
1992	Home Alone 2: Lost in New York	Fashion Model	
1997	Mr. Jealousy	Lois	
2004	The Defender	Reporter	
2005	Submerged	U.S. Ambassador	
2005	Proof	Friend at Party	
2006	Land of the Blind	Anchorwoman	
2006	United 93	Christine Snyder	
2006	Are You Ready for Love?	Candy	
2007	La luna en botella	Irene	
2011	W.E.	East Side Woman	

=== Television ===
Year	Title	Role	Notes
1998	Rear Window	Business Woman	Television film
2002	Smallpox 2002	Lesley Peters	Television film
2003	Second Nature	Dr. Shepherd	Television film
2005, 2012	Doctors	Brook Banning / Tamsin Read	2 episodes
2005	Blessed	Megan	3 episodes
2006	Feel the Force	Sergeant Beesley	6 episodes
2006	The Outsiders	Helen Harlow	Television film
2007	Numbers	Leslie Dennis	Episode: "Hollywood Homicide"
2008	Sparky & Mikaela	Mom	Episode: "Pilot"
2011	Person of Interest	Sasha	Episode: "Ghosts"
2015	Hangzhou Global Tour	Host / Self	19 episodes

=== Theatre ===
Year	Title	Role	Theatre
1991	The Will Rogers Follies	Betty's sister	
1992	Crazy for You	ensemble	
1996	A Funny Thing Happened on the Way to the Forum	Panacea	St. James Theatre
1996	Chicago	Go-to-hell-Kitty, Velma Kelly	Richard Rodgers Theatre
2001	Chicago	Velma Kelly	Richard Rodgers Theatre
2002	Contact	The girl in the yellow dress	Queen's Theatre
2005	The Producers	Ulla	Theatre Royal, Drury Lane
2007	The Producers	Ulla	
2013	A Chorus Line	Sheila	London Palladium
2017	Chicago	Velma Kelly	Ambassador Theatre
2020	Bliss	Princess Taffeta	5th Avenue Theatre

== Personal life ==
Zimmerman is married to Scottish singer Domenick Allen. The two have a daughter, who is also a theatre actress and singer, Cayleigh Capaldi.
