= Rebecca Trehearn =

Welsh-born actress

- Born: Rhyl, Denbighshire, Wales, United Kingdom
- Genres: Musical theatre
- Occupations: Singer, actress
- Website: www.rebeccatrehearn.com

Rebecca Trehearn is an actress, best known for her work in musical theatre and for portraying the character of Cheryl Thomas in S4C Soap opera, Pobol y Cwm between April 2021 and December 2024 and Karen McKay in Dim ond y Gwir.

== Education ==
Trehearn studied at Ysgol Glan Clwyd, before training at Mountview Academy of Theatre Arts, graduating in 2004.

== Career ==
In 2013, she played Molly in the UK tour of Ghost the Musical. In 2014 she played Marcy in the Southwark Playhouse production of Dogfight. She also played Caroline in The Confession Room at the St. James Theatre in 2014.

She won the 2017 Laurence Olivier Award for Best Actress in a Supporting Role in a Musical for her performance as Julie LaVerne in Show Boat, which played at the New London Theatre. She had previously played the role at the Sheffield Crucible prior to the West End transfer.

In May 2019, she played the role of Marie in the workshop of Andrew Lloyd Webber’s Cinderella. She then played the role of The Queen when the musical premiered on the West End in June 2021.
