= Jeremy Secomb =

Australian actor and singer

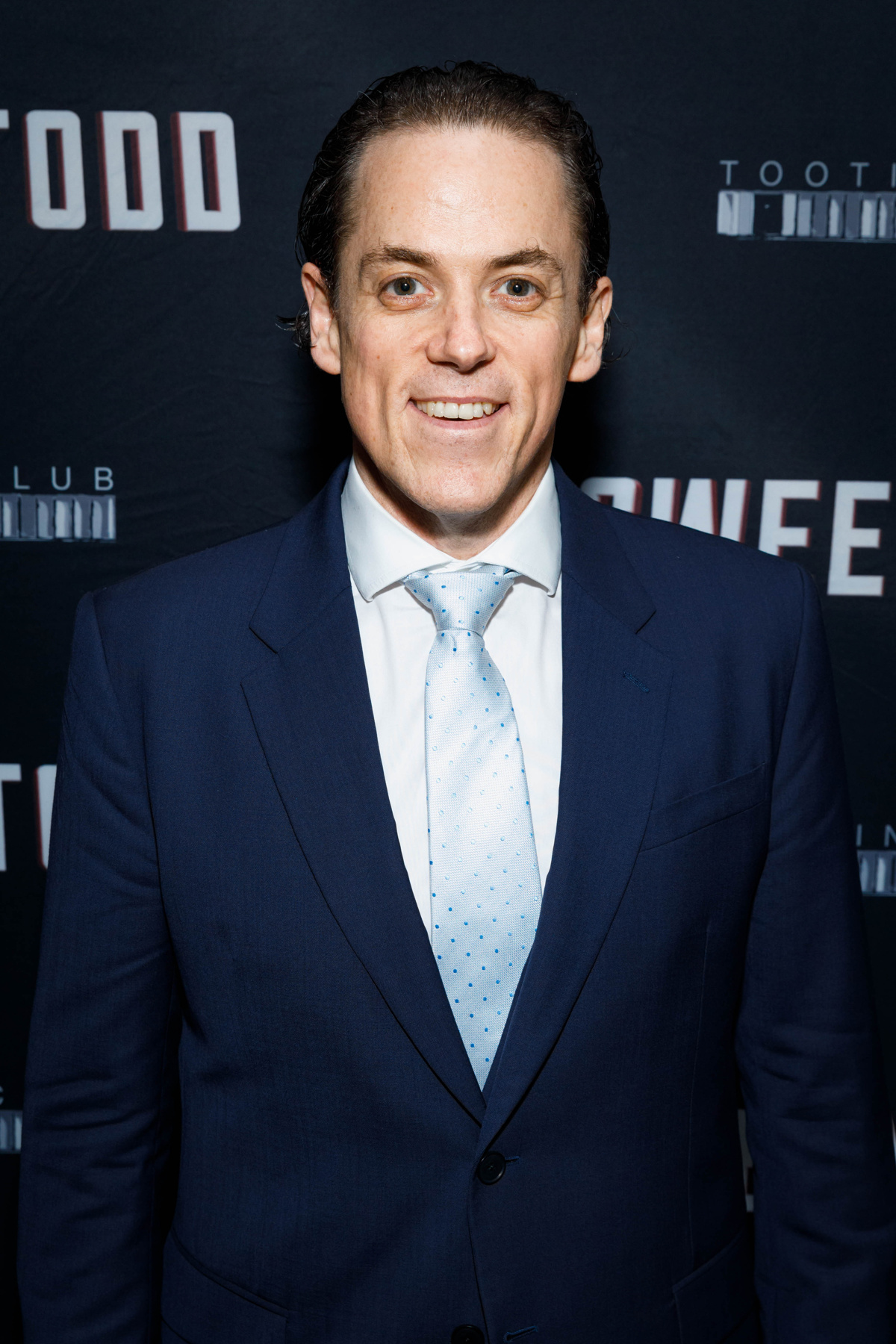
- Jeremy Secomb in 2017
- Occupations: Actor, singer
- Years active: 1996–present
- Known for: Sweeney Todd: The Demon Barber of Fleet Street; Les Misérables

Jeremy Secomb (born 25th November 1972) is an Australian actor and tenor singer. He is most well known for his various West End credits and was nominated for a Drama Desk Award for starring in the Off-Broadway revival of Sweeney Todd: The Demon Barber of Fleet Street. His West End credits include Inspector Javert in Les Misérables, Juan Peron in Evita, and Ubaldo Piangi and the Phantom of the Opera in The Phantom of the Opera.

== Acting credits ==
=== Theatre ===
| Year(s) | Production | Role | Notes |
|---|---|---|---|
| 1996-1998 | The Phantom of the Opera | u/s Ubaldo Piangi | Australian tour |
| 2000-2003 | The Phantom of the Opera | Ubaldo Piangi | West End |
| 2004 | Jesus Christ Superstar | Annas | Ferneham Hall Concert |
| 2004-2006 | The Woman in White | Ensemble | Manchester Palace Theatre |
| 2007 | Evita | Ensemble | West End |
| 2011 | Lend Me a Tenor | Ensemble u/s Tito Merelli | West End |
| 2011 | The Phantom of the Opera at the Royal Albert Hall | Ensemble | Royal Albert Hall |
| 2011-2014 | The Phantom of the Opera | Ubaldo Piangi u/s The Phantom of the Opera | West End |
| 2014 | The Phantom of the Opera | Emergency Phantom of the Opera | West End |
| 2015 | Sweeney Todd: The Demon Barber of Fleet Street | Sweeney Todd | Tooting Arts Club |
| 2015-2017 | Les Misérables | Inspector Javert | West End |
| 2016 | The Phantom of the Opera | Emergency Phantom of the Opera | West End |
| 2017 | Sweeney Todd: The Demon Barber of Fleet Street | Sweeney Todd | Off-Broadway |
| 2017 | Les Misérables | Inspector Javert | West End |
| 2017 | Evita | Juan Perón | UK Tour |
| 2018 | Les Misérables | Inspector Javert | Guernsey Concert |
| 2019 | Les Misérables | Emergency Javert | West End |
| 2020-2021 | A Christmas Carol | Jacob Marley | West End |
| 2021 | Sunset Boulevard | Max von Mayerling | Off-West End |
| 2021 | Sunset Boulevard | Max von Mayerling | Royal Albert Hall |
| 2022 | Bonnie & Clyde | Judge / Sherriff Smoot Schmid | West End |
| 2022 | Sister Act the Musical | Curtis Jackson | Eventim Apollo |
| 2023 | Evita | Juan Perón | West End |
| 2023-2024 | Stephen Sondheim's Old Friends | Performer | West End |
| 2024-2025 | Les Misérables | The Bishop of Digne | Arena Spectacular World Tour |
| 2025 | Stephen Sondheim's Old Friends | Performer | Ahmanson Theatre |
| 2025 | Stephen Sondheim's Old Friends | Performer | Broadway |
| 2025-2026 | Les Misérables | Inspector Javert | Arena Spectacular World Tour |
| 2026 | Les Misérables | Inspector Javert | Royal Albert Hall |
| 2026 | Les Misérables | Inspector Javert | Radio City Music Hall |
