= Anna-Jane Casey =

English singer, dancer and actress

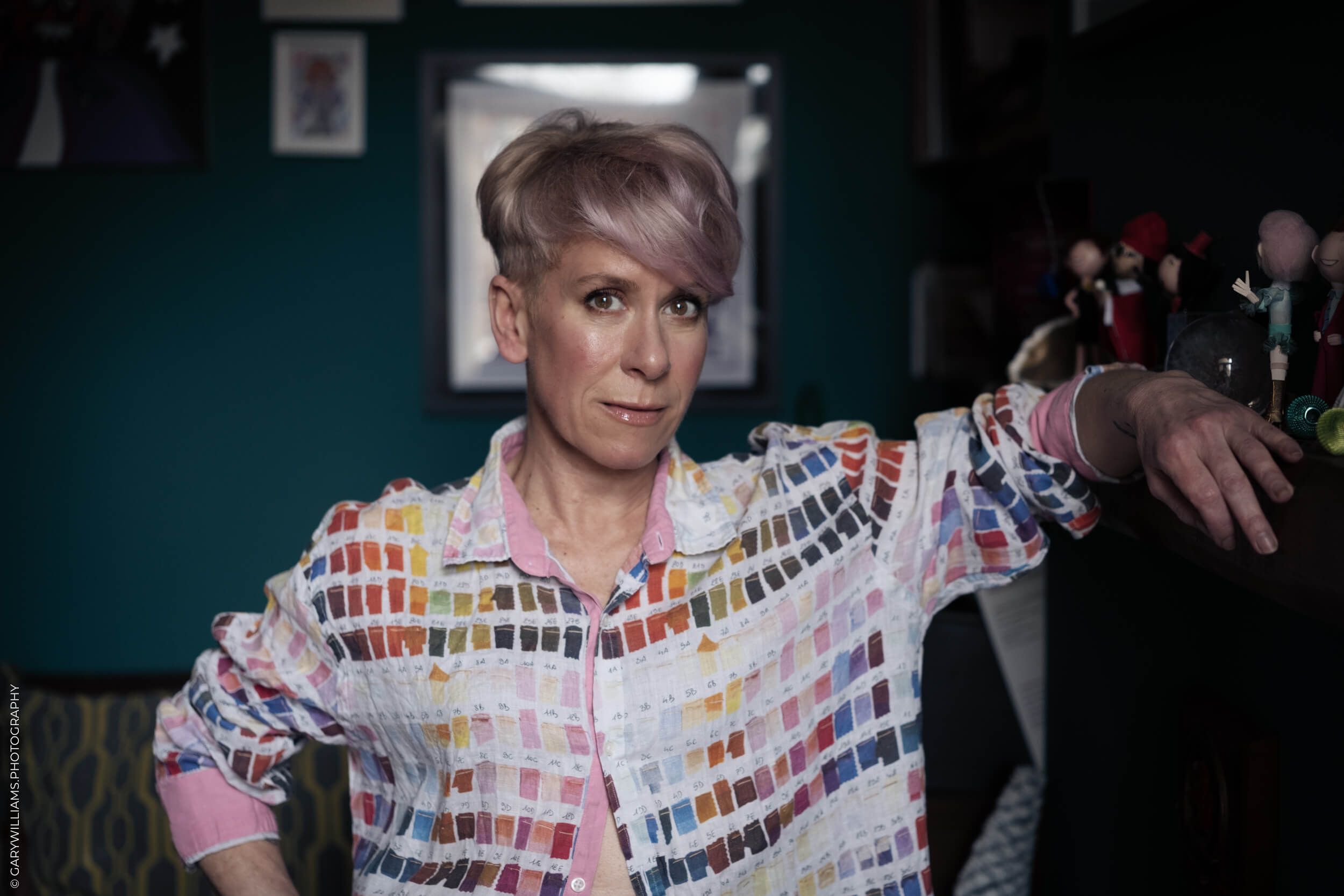
- Born: 15 February 1972 (age 54); Salford, Lancashire, England
- Years active: 1988–present
- Spouse: Graham MacDuff

Anna-Jane Casey (born 15 February 1972) is an English singer, dancer and actress best known for her work in musical theatre.

== Personal life ==
Casey was born in Salford, Lancashire, England.

Casey married fellow actor Graham MacDuff in 1998. The pair started dating whilst on the national tour of West Side Story.

In 2020, following the COVID-19 pandemic, Casey said that she and her husband had worked as delivery drivers to supplement their income during lockdown due to the lack of work.

Her sister Natalie Casey is also an actress, best known for her television roles in Hollyoaks and Two Pints of Lager and a Packet of Crisps.

== Stage career ==
Casey trained at Lupino Dance School in Bury. She appeared as Baby June in Gypsy at the Forum Theatre in Wythenshaw, Manchester which starred Josephine Blake, directed by Howard Lloyd-Lewis and choreographed by Paul Kerryson. She made her West End debut at age 16 as Rumpleteazer in Cats at New London Theatre. After two years with Cats she then went on to Children of Eden at the Prince Edward Theatre.

In 1993 Casey performed in Joseph and the Amazing Technicolor Dreamcoat at the London Palladium in the role of Reuben's Wife also understudying and playing the role of the Narrator

In 1993 she played Barbara-Lou and Rizzo (replacement) in Grease at Dominion Theatre.

She spent two years in Starlight Express at the Apollo Victoria Theatre playing the roles of Buffy, Dinah and Pearl.

In 1998 Casey fulfilled a lifelong ambition by playing Anita in West Side Story, both at the Prince Edward Theatre and on the national tour. It was during this tour she met her husband, Graham MacDuff.

Casey made her first appearance in Chicago as Velma Kelly in 1998, a role she has reprised on numerous occasions.

In 2003 Casey landed the role of Frankie Frayne in the London revival of On Your Toes at the Southbank Centre.

In 2005 she won the TMA (Theatrical Management Association) Award for Best Performance in a Musical playing Mabel in Mack & Mabel at the Watermill Theatre.

She originated the role of Dot in the London revival of Sunday in the Park with George at the Menier Chocolate Factory in 2005, but left before the production transferred to The West End and Broadway, being replaced by Jenna Russell.

After that she went on to play Maggie in Hobson's Choice from May to July 2006 at Watermill Theatre before giving birth to her son.

During 2009 she appeared in Forbidden Broadway at the Menier Chocolate Factory.

She spent the Christmas period in the title role of Aladdin at Hackney Empire.

Casey returned to Chicago from February until 24 April 2010 playing Velma Kelly alongside Ruthie Henshall.

Casey appeared in the Regent's Park Open Air Theatre production of The Comedy of Errors as the Courtesan, in summer 2010.

She appeared in the BBC Prom, alongside the John Wilson Orchestra, celebrating the music of Rodgers & Hammerstein. The concert was broadcast on the BBC on Saturday 28 August 2010. She would return to perform with the same orchestra in their 2012 BBC Prom concert entitled 'The Broadway Sound', bringing the concert to a close with an encore performance of Tap Your Troubles Away from Mack and Mabel.

From May 2013 Casey appeared as Mrs Wilkinson in Billy Elliot the Musical at the Victoria Palace Theatre in London.

From July 2014 Casey appeared in the London edition of the revue Forbidden Broadway at the Vaudeville Theatre.

From July to September 2015 Casey played the role of Lottie in a revival of musical Mack & Mabel at Chichester Festival Theatre.

From December 2016 Casey played the eponymous Annie Oakley in Annie Get Your Gun at the Sheffield Crucible.

In 2017 she recorded two songs for the album Wit & Whimsy – Songs by Alexander S. Bermange.

In January 2018, it was announced that Casey would play the role of Annie in the UK tour of Calendar Girls, which was due to open at the Leeds Grand Theatre in August 2018.

Casey was in the original cast of the 2021 revival of Cabaret starring Eddie Redmayne, in which she played Frauline Kost and understudied the role of Frauline Schneider, a role she played numerous times. Whilst in Cabaret she appeared in the Stephen Sondheim tribute concert Old Friends, which was subsequently broadcast on television. She left Cabaret to appear with Sir Ian McKellen in the national tour of Mother Goose.

In 2023 Casey was in the new Robert J. Sherman West End musical Love Birds showcase, directed by Ian Talbot.

In 2026, she was cast in the role of Alison Mayhew in the West End production of One Day.

=== Audio only ===
Casey was one of the original cast on the concept album released for The Confession Room in April 2013.

== Television roles ==
She has appeared on EastEnders, The Bill, Heartbeat and Holby City.

In 2023 she played Nicky Baron, a patient in the TV programme Casualty.
