= Feel the Force =

- Genre: Police sitcom
- Created by: Georgia Pritchett
- Starring: Michelle Gomez; Rosie Cavaliero; Leigh Zimmerman
- Country of origin: United Kingdom
- Original language: English
- No. of series: 1
- No. of episodes: 6

Production
- Running time: 30 minutes

Original release
- Network: BBC Two
- Release: 8 May – 12 June 2006

Feel the Force is a British television police sitcom produced for BBC Scotland.

The series is written by Georgia Pritchett; the first episode was broadcast on BBC 2 on 8 May 2006. The series was directed by Tristram Shapeero and produced by Catherine Bailey.

== Main characters ==
- Sally Bobbins (Michelle Gomez): a control freak who lives and breathes the police force who's peeved to be partnered with someone so incompetent as Frank.
- Sally Frank (Rosie Cavaliero): Delusional, incompetent, optimistic and totally dependent on Bobbins. Has an unrequited love for fellow officer PC MacBean who has a secret passion for his partner PC MacGregor.
- Sergeant Beasley (Leigh Zimmerman): a tall and terrifying woman who finds Frank and Bobbins a constant source of irritation.

== Episodes ==
No.	Title	Original release date
1	"Murder"	8 May 2006
Frank and Bobbins stumble upon a murder case. Bobbins is determined to prove herself to Beesley and get rid of Frank as her partner. She goes all out to solve the case, visiting the pathology lab, the morgue and even a psychic. Meanwhile, Frank is only concerned with trying to make MacBean jealous by dating another man. Unfortunately for Bobbins, Frank accidentally solves the crime, gets all the praise and Bobbins gets stuck with her as a partner forever.
2	"Joyride"	15 May 2006
Frank and Bobbins are overlooked once again when all the exciting assignments are given out. They miss out on the smuggling case and joyriding case; instead, they are asked to transport a defendant to court. Bobbins, fed up with being used as a taxi service, decides to ignore this and get involved in the other cases anyway. Meanwhile, Frank is more interested in trying out her new hypnotism technique. Things quickly go awry and they end up with the wrong defendant in court, a car full of smuggled goods and cause a rather unfortunate accident with the joyrider.
3	"Wanted"	22 May 2006
The Most Wanted Man in Scotland is on the loose and in the area. Frank and Bobbins want to be assigned the job of bringing him in, but that goes to their rivals MacBean and MacGregor. Instead, Beesley makes them babysit her daughter Emily. After terrorizing, terrifying and corrupting the seven-year-old girl, they manage to steal the Most Wanted Man from MacBean and MacGregor in a most underhand way. Bobbins thinks this is her big chance to impress the visiting Chief of Police – but she hasn't counted on Emily ruining things for her.
4	"Stakeout"	29 May 2006
Frank and Bobbins are asked to stake out a criminal's house. They set up camp in an old lady's flat with camera, binoculars and bugging equipment. They quickly become distracted and Bobbins becomes more interested in being the old lady's favorite while Frank is focused on trying to prove to MacBean that she's not shallow. They end up trashing the old lady's flat and cuffing their rivals MacBean and MacGregor in order to beat them to making an arrest. They return triumphant to the station, expecting congratulations – but there is a tiny detail they've overlooked.
5	"Siege"	5 June 2006
Frank and Bobbins get sacked and find jobs standing on the street wearing sandwich boards saying 'golf sale'. While they are standing in the cold, a siege takes place in the block of flats next to them. A man called Jeff is having a small personal crisis and is holding two people hostage. Frank and Bobbins decide to solve the siege but when they try to release the hostages, they only succeed in being taken hostage themselves. As if Jeff didn't have enough problems, he now has to cope with the two most annoying hostages in the world.
6	"Undercover"	12 June 2006
Frank and Bobbins are the only people not allowed to be part of Operation Steel Fist which is investigating a major drugs ring. They manage to change all this when they find out that Beesley has had several complaints made about her attitude towards women and is in danger of being sacked. They use this information to blackmail her into giving them all the jobs they've ever wanted – as police frogmen, undercover cops and they even get a disastrous trip out on police horses. Best of all, they get to head up Operation Steel Fist and eventually come face to face with Mr Big.

== Theme Music ==
- The three stars (Gomez, Cavaliero and Zimmerman) sing the theme tune (a version of the UK hit single 'Can You Feel the Force' by The Real Thing). They recorded it with Jonathan Whitehead.

== See also ==
- Smack the Pony, a sketch show with material written by Georgia Pritchett and co-directed by Tristram Shapeero.
- Green Wing, a sitcom starring Michelle Gomez as Sue White, and co-directed by Tristram Shapeero, with Rosie Cavaliero making guest appearances.
