= William Flynn =

William, Bill or Billy Flynn may refer to:

== Arts and entertainment ==
- Billy Flynn (Chicago) (fl. 1926), fictional lawyer from the musical Chicago
- Bill Flynn (1948–2007), South African film and theater actor and comedian
- Billy Flynn (musician) (born 1956), American Chicago blues guitarist
- Billy Flynn (actor) (born 1985), American actor

== Law and politics ==
- William J. Flynn (1867–1928), American director of the Bureau of Investigation
- William S. Flynn (1885–1966), American politician; governor of Rhode Island
- Bill Flynn (Florida politician) (1917–1984), American politician in the Florida House of Representatives
- Bill Flynn (New Jersey politician) (born 1938), American politician in the New Jersey General Assembly
- Bill Flynn (Australian politician) (1951–2011), Queensland MP and leader of One Nation

== Sports ==
- William Flynn (golfer) (1890–1944), American golf course architect
- William Flynn (American football) (died 1958), American football coach
- Bill Flynn (footballer) (1907–1991), Australian rules footballer
- William J. Flynn (athletic director) (died 1997), American college athletics administrator

== Others ==
- William J. Flynn (businessman) (1926–2018), American businessman and activist for peace in Northern Ireland
- William "Billy" Flynn, responsible for the murder of Gregory Smart, the husband of Pamela Smart

== See also ==
- William Flinn (1851–1924), U.S. political figure
