= The Confession Room =

- Music: Dan Looney
- Lyrics: Dan Looney; Reece Looney; Sam Champness
- Book: Patrick Wilde
- Basis: Dan Looney; Reece Looney
- Productions: 2014 St James Theatre

The Confession Room is a British musical comedy written by Dan Looney (music, lyrics & original concept), Patrick Wilde (book), Reece Looney (additional lyrics & original concept) and Sam Champness (additional lyrics).

== Plot ==
"The Confession Room" is the name of support group in the heart of New York where people come to get things off of their chest, however embarrassing or silly. These "confessions" range from a guy who admits to having a slightly "different" ex-girlfriend, to a girl who is tired of being treated as just a "ditsy" blonde. The story centres around the groups counsellor, Caroline and a mysterious newcomer to the group, Oliver, who has the desire to wreak havoc among the group and to finish the room for good.

== Production history ==
The Confession Room was released as a concept album in May 2013 on the SimG Records label, starring Anna-Jane Casey, Dean Chisnall, Alex Gaumond, Ross Hunter, Matthew Rowland, Devon-Elise Johnson, and Joshua Lovell, among others. The album also featured a twelve-piece orchestra and an ensemble of thirty singers. The album was musically directed by the show's musical supervisor Tim Evans, directed by Paul Foster, and orchestrated by Florian Cooper.

In July 2014, the show played at the St. James Theatre, London starring Jon Robyns, Rebecca Trehearn, Stuart Matthew Price and many of the concept album's original cast. The concert also included the same creative team as the album, with Tim Evans as musical director, Paul Foster as director, and Florian Cooper as orchestrator. The concert was produced by Robin Rayner.

The show has also played the Landor Theatre as part of Knockhardy Productions' "From Page to Stage" 2013 season whilst the song "Excalibur93" was a finalist at the "Stiles & Drewe Best New Song Award 2013".

== Characters ==
- Caroline : The group's 'happy-go-lucky' counsellor who has run the group for three years.
- Oliver : The mysterious newcomer to the group, eager to cause unrest.
- Bradley : The long-term member turned counsellor's assistant with a shocking secret that he kept hidden for many years.
- Tony : Another long-term member who stays silent and watches from afar.
- Shane : An attention-seeking, egotistical individual who is a pathological liar.
- Grace : Shy, timid and has a job making cakes but has a huge crush on one of her clients.
- Frank : A man with a long list of problems and ailments that he compiles every week, but he has one simple dream - to be a hero.
- Tiffany : A stereotypical blonde, the eye-candy of the group but she is convinced that she can be more than her appearance dictates.
- Matt : A newer member to the group who has an embarrassing secret about his ex-girlfriend.
- Paul : A thirty-something man who still lives and cares for his mum, but is she taking advantage of his good nature?
- Sarah : Frustrated with her life, career and relationship status, she uses sexual innuendo to try and assert dominance over the men of the group.
- Annie : Flits between all the members of the group, never really fitting in but never the outsider.

== Musical numbers ==
Act 1:

- "Overture" - Orchestra
- "Confession Room part 1" - Oliver, Tiffany, Paul, Sarah, Bradley and Company
- "Confession Room part 2" - Bradley and Company
- "In Bed" - Matt, Bradley and the Boys
- "Ditsy Blonde" - Tiffany
- "Happy-Go-Lucky" - Caroline and Company
- "Plus 70 Women" - Shane
- "Through the Bakery Window" - Grace
- "Act 1 Finale" - Bradley and Company

Act 2:

- "Entr'acte" - Orchestra
- "Let Me Just Dream" - Grace, Tiffany, Sarah and Annie
- "Perfect" - Oliver
- "Pumpkin Boy" - Paul
- "Weird and Wonderful" - Company
- "Excalibur93" - Frank
- "Caroline's Confession" - Caroline
- "Second Chances" - Tony and Company
- "Finale" - Bradley and Company
- "Bows" - Orchestra and Company
- "Playoff" - Orchestra

‡ On the concept album recording, the song "Sexed Out" was added as a bonus track, sung by the show's composer Dan Looney.

== Cast ==
| Character | St James Theatre Cast |
|---|---|
| Caroline | Rebecca Trehearn |
| Oliver | Jon Robyns |
| Bradley | Joshua Lovell |
| Tony | Stuart Matthew Price |
| Shane | John Sandberg |
| Grace | Devon-Elise Johnson |
| Frank | Matthew Rowland |
| Tiffany | Stephanie Clift |
| Matt | Ben Fenner |
| Paul | Steven Bush |
| Sarah | Natalie Bush |
| Annie | Rebecca Jayne-Davis |

== Critical reception ==
The Confession Room received a mix of criticism. Though the reviews for the album were largely very positive, those for the stage performance were more critical.

West End Frame wrote that the album lyrics were "outrageously funny" but pointed out that a stage production had the potential to be "cheap and tacky". Review Graveyard found the album to be cohesive and engaging, with excellent arrangement and a good amount of comedy, adding that they were only disappointed that they didn't get an idea of the story for the show from the album.

West End Wilma stated that the stage setup for the show gave the impression of audience-inclusion, but also pointed out the "unfortunately restricting style of music", mentioning that the show relies on pop style and vulgar language to keep the audience engaged.

British Theatre Guide commented that while they found the music itself pleasant, the lyrics sometimes felt contrived. They also commented on the crude humor. Regarding the show itself, they found it to be a largely character-driven piece with little plot, lacking both the moments that made A Chorus Line notable and the trauma of Rent from which the show seems to draw its theme, setting, and method.
