= Jon Robyns =

British actor

- Born: 8 December 1982 (age 43); Manchester, England
- Occupations: Actor, Singer, Musician
- Years active: 2004 – present
- Known for: Les Misérables; The Phantom of the Opera
- Website: http://www.jonrobyns.co.uk

Jon Robyns (born 8 December 1982) is a British stage actor, who is best known for playing Jean Valjean in Les Misérables and the title role in The Phantom of the Opera in London's West End.

== Early life ==
Robyns was born in Manchester and grew up in Liverpool, England. Moving to Bristol at the age of 10 he became involved with several local theatre and youth music groups. Performing in such varied shows as Purcell's Dido and Aeneas and Handel's Messiah to Kander and Ebb's classic musical Cabaret. He worked on new material with Playbox Theatre Company performing NEWS and performed two new operas with MusicBox Youth Opera; Fox at the manger and Brundibar.

In 1999 Robyns moved to Cardiff becoming involved with Welsh National Youth Opera. With WNYO he performed The Beggar's Opera, The Elixir of Love and Dido and Aeneas (again). Robyns was also part of Black Mountain Male Voice Choir – the official Choir of the 1999 Rugby World Cup, singing at Wales games and the opening and closing ceremonies at Cardiffs Millennium Stadium. With his friends, Robyns ran a weekly drama group and worked on a production of Berkovs West whilst studying Music, Theatre Studies and Sociology A Level.

During this time Robyns was part of the National Youth Choir of Great Britain singing in venues around the country including Walton's Belshazars Feast at the Millennium Proms at the Royal Albert Hall.

Robyns is a supporter of Liverpool FC.

== Training ==
In 2001 Robyns attended the 3-year Musical Theatre course at Mountview Academy of Theatre Arts in London. During his final year Robyns played Sweeney Todd in Stephen Sondheim's masterpiece musical. Other roles at drama school include Teddy in Harold Pinter's The Homecoming, Banquo in Macbeth and Jesus in Godspell.

== Career ==
Graduating in 2004 Robyns joined the UK touring company of Miss Saigon understudying the role Chris and playing the part on many occasions. After this he played the role of Mark Cohen in Rent with The English Theatre, Frankfurt, Germany. In June 2006 Robyns played the roles of Princeton and Rod in the original London cast of Avenue Q the musical in London's West End. He left the show in December 2007. Robyns was part of the company for the concert version of Chess at the Royal Albert Hall on 12 and 13 May 2008.

Robyns played the role of Marius Pontmercy in Les Misérables at the Queen's Theatre until leaving the show on 23 June 2009. He has rejoined the cast of Les Misérables during the 25th Anniversary International Tour as Enjolras and is on the live recording Album. Robyns appeared at the O2 Arena on 3 October alongside current/previous cast members from across the world in a 25th Anniversary concert.

In 2008 Robyns recorded a song for the CD Act One – Songs From The Musicals Of Alexander S. Bermange, an album of 20 brand new recordings by 26 West End stars, released in November 2008 on Dress Circle Records, and recorded the role of robot ThreeSix in a concept album of Laurence Mark Wythe's musical The Lost Christmas. He has previously recorded material for Whyte and in 2005 appeared in a showcase of one of the composer's musicals at Greenwich Theatre.

In 2011 Robyns joined the cast of Spamalot as part of the UK Tour, performing the role of Sir Galahad. The show toured the UK throughout 2012, before a return to the West End at the Harold Pinter Theatre and then in 2013 Robyns played Oliver in The Confession Room at the St. James Theatre in London.

In 2014 Robyns joined the original London cast of Memphis, playing the role of first cover Huey before being cast as Caractacus Potts in the musical Chitty Chitty Bang Bang at the West Yorkshire Playhouse (now named the Leeds Playhouse). The role was latterly taken by larger-profile performers on the subsequent UK Tour, including Jason Manford and Lee Mead.

In 2016 Robyns played Emmett Forrest in the Leicester Curve production of Legally Blonde, and performed in both the UK tour of Sister Act as Eddie and The Wedding Singer as Robbie Hart. Following this, in 2018 Robyns joined the West End cast of Hamilton at the Victoria Palace theatre playing King George III.

In December 2019, Robyns took over the role of Jean Valjean in the new production of Les Misérables at the Sondheim Theatre (formerly The Queens). The production was closed in March 2020 due to the COVID-19 pandemic. Robyns, along with Dean Chisnall (whom, until 14 January 2023, performed as Jean Valjean on the UK/Ireland tour), reprised the role of Jean Valjean in the staged concert version of the show, opening in May 2021. Robyns was then cast as Valjean when the Sondheim reopened. On 7 February 2023 it was announced that the matinee and evening shows of 25 February 2023 would be his last as Valjean, before he left Les Mis.

On 18 January 2023, it was announced that Robyns was cast as The Phantom in Andrew Lloyd Webber's The Phantom of the Opera, taking over the role from Earl Carpenter on 3 April. He played the role until June 2024.

In 2025, Robyns performed in two shorter West End runs. Firstly as the titular character in Figaro: An Original Musical which ran for a week in February at the London Palladium, followed by The Great Gatsby from April to September, where he played the role of Tom Buchannan at the London Colosseum. It was also announced during this run that he would takeover the role of Miss Trunchbull in Matilda The Musical.

== Stage credits ==
Year	Title	Role	Theatre	Location
2003	Sweeney Todd: The Demon Barber of Fleet Street	Sweeney Todd	Mountview Academy of Theatre Arts	London
2004	Miss Saigon	Ensemble / 1st Cover Chris	—N/a	UK National Tour
2005	Rent	Mark Cohen	English Theatre, Frankfurt	Frankfurt, Germany
2006-2007	Avenue Q	Princeton & Rod	Noël Coward Theatre	West End
2008	Chess	Ensemble	Royal Albert Hall	London
2008-2009	Les Misérables	Marius Pontmercy	Queen's Theatre	West End
2010	Les Misérables	Enjolras	—N/a	25th Anniversary UK Tour
2010	Les Misérables	Factory Worker	O2 Arena	London
2011-2012	Spamalot	Sir Galahad / Prince Herbert's Father / Black Knight	—N/a	UK National Tour
2012-2013	Spamalot	Sir Galahad / Prince Herbert's Father / Black Knight	Harold Pinter Theatre	West End
2013	Dessa Rose	Adam Nehemiah	Trafalgar Studios	West End
2014	Memphis	Ensemble / 1st Cover Huey	Shaftesbury Theatre	West End
2015	Chitty Chitty Bang Bang	Caractacus Potts	—N/a	UK National Tour
2016	Legally Blonde	Emmett Forrest	Curve, Leicester	Leicester
2016	Sister Act	Eddie	—N/a	UK National Tour
2017	The Wedding Singer	Robbie Hart	—N/a	UK National Tour
2018-2019	Hamilton	King George III	Victoria Palace Theatre	West End
2019-2023	Les Misérables	Jean Valjean	Sondheim Theatre	West End
2023-2024	The Phantom of the Opera	The Phantom of the Opera	His Majesty's Theatre	West End
2025	Figaro: An Original Musical	Figaro DeLuca	The London Palladium	West End
2025	The Great Gatsby	Tom Buchanan	London Coliseum	West End
2025-2026	Matilda The Musical	Miss Trunchbull	Cambridge Theatre	West End
