= London Palladium =

West End theatre in London

- Corinthian Bazaar; National Skating Palace; The Palladium
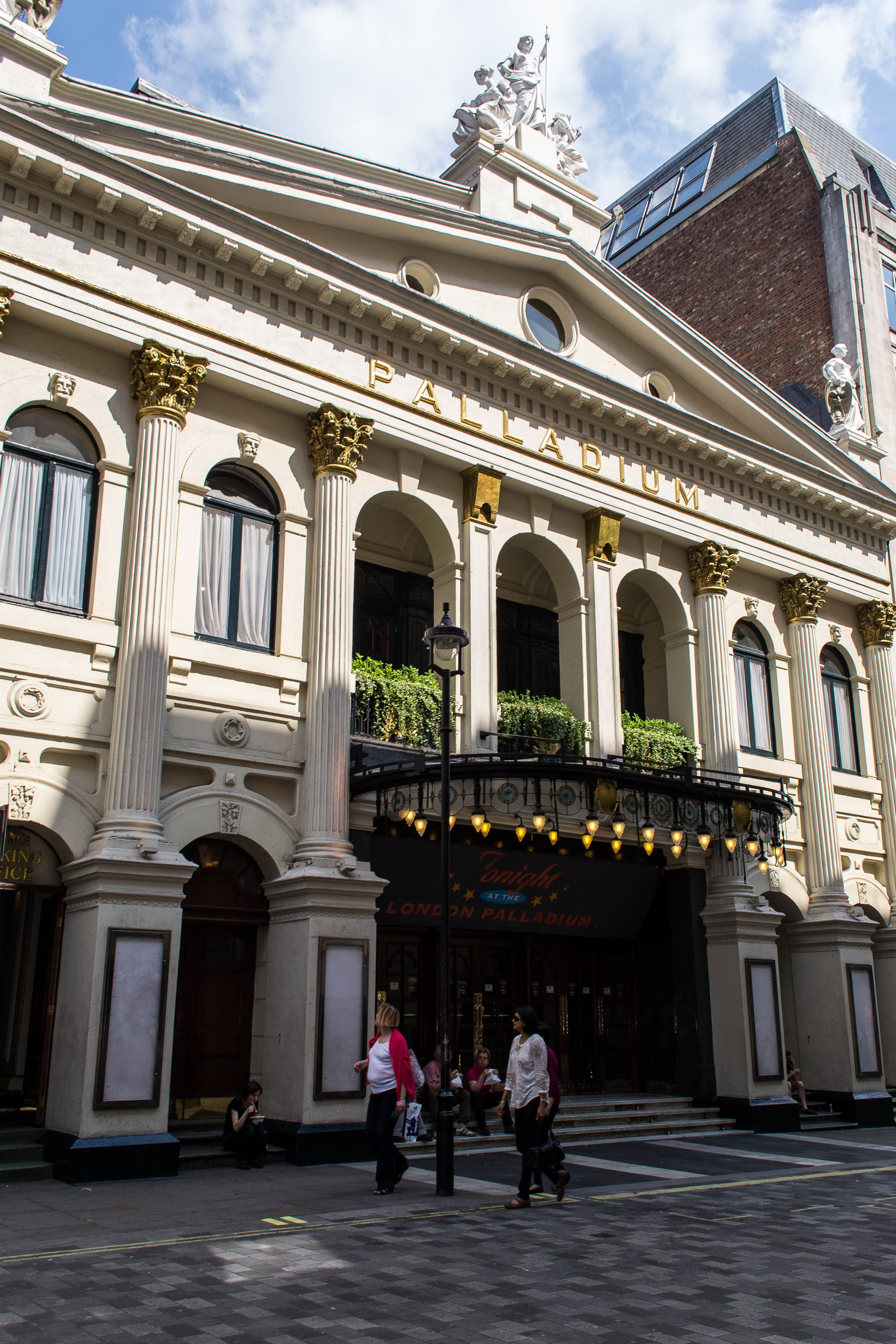
- London Palladium in 2014
- Interactive map of London Palladium
- Address: 8 Argyll Street, W1F 7TF
- Location: London, United Kingdom
- Coordinates: 51.5146°N 0.1405°W
- Owner: LW Theatres
- Capacity: 2,286
- Type: West End theatre
- Public transit: Oxford Circus

Construction
- Opened: 26 December 1910; 115 years ago 17 May 2021; 5 years ago
- Renovated: 2020–2021
- Years active: 1926–present
- Architect: Frank Matcham

Website
- Official website

Listed Building – Grade II*
- Official name: The London Palladium Theatre
- Designated: 28 June 1972
- Reference no.: 1210130

The London Palladium (/pəˈleɪdiəm/ pə-LAY-dee-əm) is a Grade II* West End theatre located on Argyll Street, in the Soho district of London. The theatre was designed by Frank Matcham and opened in 1910. The auditorium holds 2,286 people. Hundreds of stars have played there, many with televised performances. Between 1955 and 1969, Sunday Night at the London Palladium was staged at the venue, produced for the ITV network. The show on 13 October 1963 included a performance by the Beatles; one newspaper's headlines in the following days coined the term "Beatlemania" to describe the hysterical interest in the band.

While the theatre hosts resident shows, it is also able to host one-off performances, such as concerts, TV specials and Christmas pantomimes. It has hosted the Royal Variety Performance 43 times, most recently in 2019.

== Architecture ==
Walter Gibbons, an early moving-pictures manager, intended for the Palladium, in 1910, to compete with Sir Edward Moss's London Hippodrome and Sir Oswald Stoll's London Coliseum. The facade (on the site of Argyll House, demolished in the 1860s, from which the pub opposite took the name The Argyll Arms), dates back to the 19th century. Formerly it was a temporary wooden building called Corinthian Bazaar, which featured an aviary and aimed to attract customers from the recently closed Pantheon Bazaar (now the site of Marks & Spencer) in Oxford Street. The theatre was rebuilt a year later by Fredrick Hengler, the son of a tightrope walker, as a circus arena for entertainments that included promenade concerts, pantomimes and an aquatic display in a flooded ring. It then became the National Skating Palace – a skating rink with real ice. However, the rink failed and the Palladium was redesigned by Frank Matcham – a famous theatrical architect who had also designed the Coliseum – on the site that had previously housed Hengler's Circus.

The theatre retains many of its original features and was Grade II* listed in September 1960. The building now carries Heritage Foundation commemorative plaques honouring Lew Grade and Frankie Vaughan.

The Palladium had its own telephone system so the occupants of boxes could call one another. It also had a revolving stage.

== History ==
=== 1910 to 1928 ===
The theatre started out as The Palladium, a premier venue for variety performances. Pantomimes were also featured there. In 1926, the pantomime starred Lennie Dean as Cinderella, of which footage has survived. The theatre is especially linked to the Royal Variety Performances, where many were, and still are, held. In 1928, for three months the Palladium also ran as a cinema. Following this 'cine-variety' episode the theatre fell dark for a short period in the autumn of 1928.

=== The George Black era ===
From 3 September 1928, the Palladium reopened under the directorship of the impresario/producer George Black as part of the General Theatre Corporation (GTC). When Black took control the theatre was close to bankruptcy. He revived its fortunes by returning to the original ethos of the Palladium by staging large variety shows, with a capital 'V' – and as well as headlining Britain's homegrown acts he brought over big American stars such as Duke Ellington and his Orchestra (on 12 June 1933, his first ever concert hall performance), Adelaide Hall, Louis Armstrong and Ethel Waters for two-week engagements. Before too long, under Black's management the Palladium was soon gaining praise again as 'The World's Leading Variety Theatre'. In 1935, Black initiated the Crazy Gang revues at the Palladium (for which he is chiefly remembered) with Life Begins at Oxford Circus. The revues continued at the Palladium as an annual event until they transferred to the Victoria Palace theatre in 1940. Black managed the Palladium until his death in 1945.

The climax of the 1935 Alfred Hitchcock spy thriller The 39 Steps was filmed at the Palladium.

=== Second World War ===
The theatre was hit by an unexploded German parachute mine on 11 May 1941. The device had fallen through the roof, becoming lodged over the stage. A Royal Navy bomb disposal team was sent to deal with it. After the mine was located, the fuse locking ring had to be turned to allow access to the fuse itself. Rather disconcertingly, the fuse began ticking as soon as it was touched. This caused a rapid evacuation of the immediate area, but the mine did not detonate. The two team members cautiously returned, extracted the fuse and removed other hazardous components, rendering the mine 'safe'. It was then lowered to the stage and disposed of. The George Medal for gallantry and undaunted devotion to duty was given to Sub Lieutenant Graham Maurice Wright for his action in the Palladium on that night. He was later killed, on 19 August 1941, while en route for Gibraltar on board the torpedoed troopship SS Aguila.

=== The Val Parnell era ===
Val Parnell took over as managing director after George Black's death in 1945. He adopted a controversial, but very successful, policy of presenting high-priced, big-name American acts at the top of the bill. Among many, the list included Carmen Miranda, Judy Garland, Sophie Tucker, Bing Crosby, Danny Kaye, Rosemary Clooney, Channing Pollock, the Andrews Sisters with Vic Schoen and his orchestra, Bob Hope, Liza Minnelli, Lena Horne, Ella Fitzgerald, Peggy Lee, Frank Sinatra, Sammy Davis Jr., Frankie Laine and Johnnie Ray, freezing out many British stars of the day, who were relegated to second-billing.

From 1955 to 1967, the theatre was the setting for the top-rated ITV Network variety show Sunday Night at the London Palladium hosted first by Tommy Trinder, followed by Bruce Forsyth, Norman Vaughan, and Jimmy Tarbuck. The programme was broadcast live every week by ATV, which was owned by the famous theatrical impresario Lew Grade. Production was by Val Parnell. Six programmes aired as special episodes in the United States between May and August 1966 on NBC. British stars on the show included Cliff Richard and the Shadows, Petula Clark, the Beatles and the Rolling Stones. The Beatles' publicist, Tony Barrow, said that after the band's first appearance on the show on 13 October 1963, Beatlemania took off in the UK. Their performance was watched by 15 million viewers. One national paper's headlines in the following days coined the term "Beatlemania" to describe the phenomenal and increasingly hysterical interest in the Beatles – and it stuck.

Parnell became associated with a property development company and began to sell Moss Empires' theatres for redevelopment. When it became known in 1966 that this fate awaited the London Palladium, The Victoria Palace and even the Theatre Royal, Drury Lane, Prince Littler organised a take-over to save the theatres and Val Parnell retired to live in France. The new managing director of Stoll-Moss was Louis Benjamin, who took on the role while continuing as MD of Pye Records within the ATV Group.

By 1965, the Wine Society was operating out of a cellar under the Palladium. Additionally, it was also using one at Joiner Street under London Bridge Station and one at St James's Bond in Rotherhithe (which flooded at high tide). In 1968, Sammy Davis Jr. starred in Golden Boy, the first book musical to be produced in the venue. A Johnny Cash album was recorded there in 1968, but Columbia Records never released it. Bootlegs of the performance are in circulation. Jose Feliciano also recorded a hit USA gold status double LP for RCA records called "Alive Alive O!" in April 1969

=== Post-Parnell ===
Bing Crosby at the Palladium in 1976. He released the album, Bing Crosby Live at the London Palladium, later that year.

On 6 December 1970 Dorothy Squires gave a concert at the Palladium, recorded for an LP release the following year.

In January 1973, glam rock band Slade played a concert in the theatre which resulted in the venue's balcony nearly collapsing.

In July 1974, singer Cass Elliott performed for two weeks. 48 hours after her final performance she died in her sleep in her rented flat in Mayfair.

Bing Crosby performed for two weeks at the Palladium starting on 21 June 1976. The resulting live album Bing Crosby Live at the London Palladium reached No. 9 in the UK album charts in November 1977.

In October 1976, Marvin Gaye recorded a live concert at the venue. The performance documented on the resulting double LP, entitled Live at the London Palladium and released in 1977.

In 1979, Kate Bush performed at the Palladium with her first concert tour the Tour of Life.

In 1981, the cellars of the Palladium housed a waxworks museum, aptly called "The Palladium Cellars", headlined by a Yul Bryner live projection automaton, as the cowboy Gunslinger from Westworld.

In the late 1980s, the Palladium was once again the setting for the popular ITV variety show, Live From the Palladium, compered by Jimmy Tarbuck. During this time, the theatre was under the ownership of the Stoll Moss Theatres Group, and the management of Margaret and David Locke, who were both major shareholders of Stoll Moss at the time.

In 1988, the Edinburgh Gang Show appeared as part of the British Musical Hall Society's Silver Jubilee.

In 1991, a new production of the Tim Rice and Andrew Lloyd Webber musical Joseph and the Amazing Technicolor Dreamcoat opened starring Jason Donovan in the title role with Linzi Hateley as the Narrator. Phillip Schofield later replaced Donovan in the title role.

In 1994, Cameron Mackintosh produced a new revival of Lionel Bart's musical Oliver!, directed by Sam Mendes. It starred Jonathan Pryce as Fagin and Sally Dexter as Nancy.

In 1998, Arlene Phillips directed and choreographed a stage musical adaptation of Saturday Night Fever starring Adam Garcia and Ben Richards.

=== 21st century ===
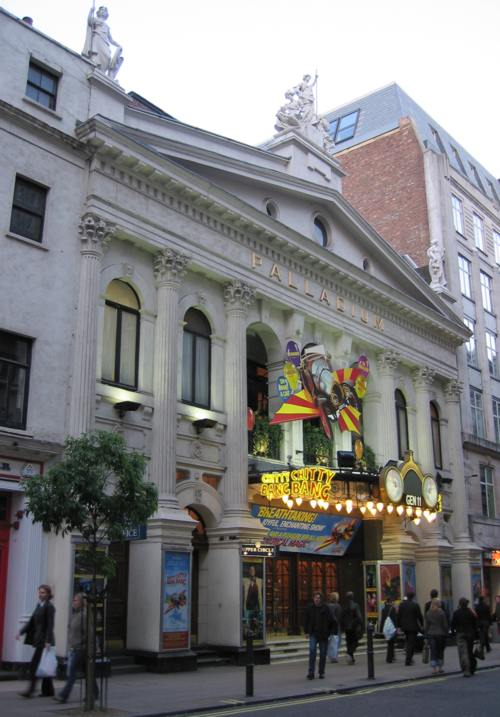
Production of Chitty Chitty Bang Bang at the Palladium in May 2004

In 2000, ownership of the theatre changed once again when Stoll Moss was acquired by Andrew Lloyd Webber's Really Useful Group. From 3 May 2000 to 5 January 2002, the Palladium played The King and I starring Elaine Paige and Jason Scott Lee. This production was a West End transfer of the successful 1996 Broadway production. Before the opening, the box office had already taken in excess of £7 million in ticket sales. This version of the show was a lavish affair, with new dialogue and music added, while the original material was updated. During the run, Josie Lawrence played the role of Anna and Paul Nakauchi and Keo Woolford played the role of the King, respectively. After the production closed, the famous (but outdated) revolving stage was removed to make way for more modern technology.

From April 2002 to 4 September 2005, the Palladium hosted a theatrical version of Chitty Chitty Bang Bang with songscore by the Sherman Brothers as a successor to The King & I, directed by Adrian Noble and choreographed by Gillian Lynne. The original cast included Michael Ball, Emma Williams, Anton Rodgers, Nichola McAuliffe, Brian Blessed and Richard O'Brien. Throughout its three-and-a-half-year run at the venue, the production starred many celebrities. This show proved to be the most successful in the theatre's long history and reunited, 50 years later, the show's choreographer Gillian Lynne, with the theatre in which she had appeared as the Palladium's Star Dancer during the early 1950s.

On 1 November 2004 and 22 November singer-songwriter Jackson Browne performed two concerts during his solo acoustic tour. For Christmas 2005–06, the venue staged Bill Kenwright's production of Scrooge – The Musical which closed on 14 January 2006. The show starred Tommy Steele, making a return to the Palladium. From February 2006, the theatre played host to a new musical production entitled Sinatra At The London Palladium, which featured a live band, large screen projections and dancers performing Frank Sinatra's greatest hits.

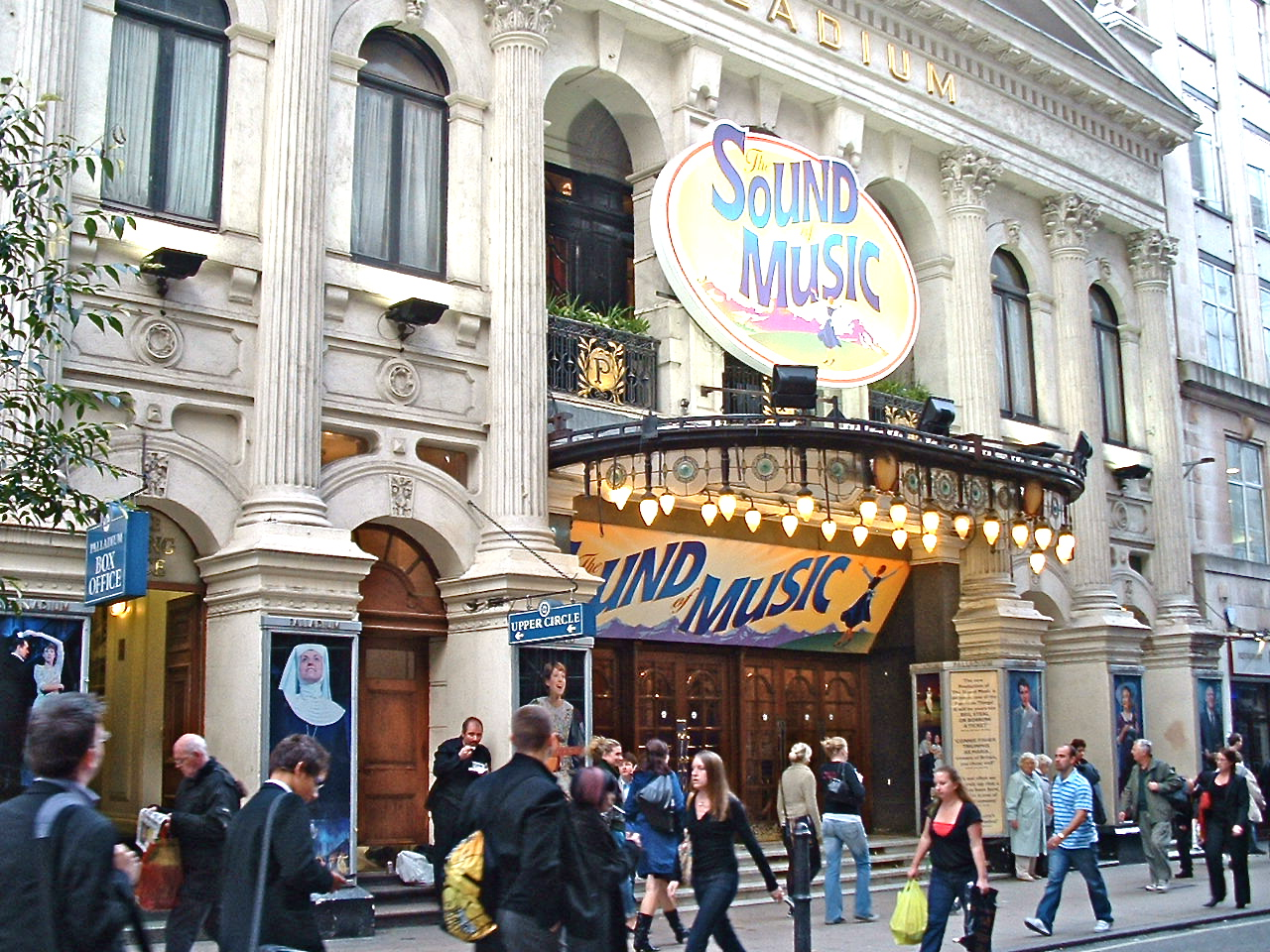
The Sound of Music at the Palladium in February 2007

Lloyd Webber and David Ian's production of The Sound of Music opened at the Palladium in November 2006. The production ran for just over two years, before closing on 21 February 2009. It starred Connie Fisher and Summer Strallen as Maria, Simon Shepherd, Alexander Hanson and Simon MacCorkindale as Captain Von Trapp and Lesley Garrett and Margaret Preece as the Mother Abbess. A production of Sister Act the Musical opened on 2 June 2009, starring Patina Miller as Deloris, Sheila Hancock as Mother Superior, Ian Lavender as Monsignor Howard, Chris Jarman as Shank, Ako Mitchell as Eddie, Katie Rowley Jones as Sister Mary Robert, Claire Greenway as Sister Mary Patrick and Julia Sutton as Sister Mary Lazarus.

Rufus Wainwright held two sold out Judy Garland tribute concerts at the theatre on 18 and 25 February 2007. On 20 May 2007 the London Palladium hosted the 2007 BAFTA awards, which were broadcast on BBC television, and in 2010 the BAFTA Television Awards returned to the Palladium. While the Theatre has a resident show, it is still able to have one-off performances; this is enabled by the scenery of the resident show being designed to be easily removed. For example, the set of Sister Act was able to be hoisted completely above the stage out of view in an area called the Fly Loft.

==== 2010s ====
The London Palladium turned 100 years old on Boxing Day 2010, and a one-hour television special entitled '100 Years of the Palladium' aired on BBC Two on 31 December 2010. Sir Elton John performed at the venue in September 2013 in a special show where he was presented with the Brit Awards Icon, subsequently broadcast on ITV1. Robbie Williams promoted his new album Swings Both Ways, the UK's 1000th No. 1 album, with a one-night performance on 8 November 2013 that was filmed for television broadcast (BBC One). He was joined by members of the cast of The Muppet Show (Kermit the Frog, Miss Piggy, Fozzie Bear, Gonzo, Statler and Waldorf), Lily Allen, Rufus Wainwright, his father, a children's choir and a 30-piece orchestra. Invited guests included Adele and One Direction.

From 2011 to 2012, the Palladium became home to Andrew Lloyd Webber's new production of The Wizard of Oz which featured new songs by Lloyd Webber and Tim Rice and starred Michael Crawford, Danielle Hope, Hannah Waddingham, Russell Grant, Sophie Evans and Des O'Connor. This was followed by a return season of Scrooge: The Musical starring Tommy Steele. In 2013 it became home to a revival of A Chorus Line starring John Partridge, Scarlett Strallen and Leigh Zimmerman.

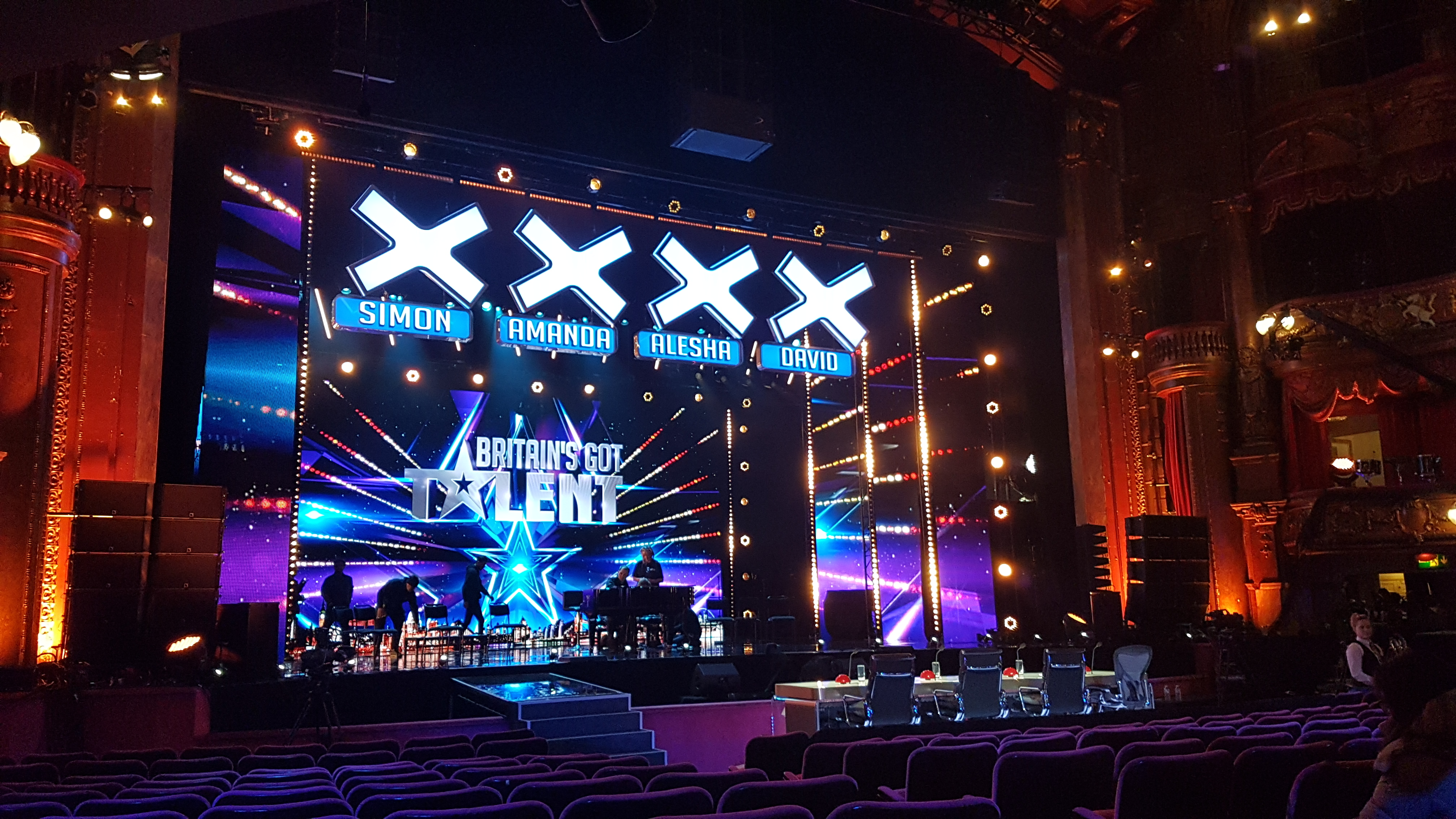
The auditions of Britain's Got Talent at the Palladium in January 2019

Since 2013, excluding 2014, 2015 and 2016, Britain's Got Talent have held Judges' auditions at the Palladium as one part of their audition tour which usually lasts from mid-January to late-February.

In 2014, Really Useful Group split in two, and the entity owning the theatre became the Really Useful Theatres Group. A revival of Andrew Lloyd Webber's Cats played for a season in late 2014 starring Nicole Scherzinger as Grizabella (later Kerry Ellis). It returned for another season in late 2015 starring Beverley Knight.

In December 2016, the annual Christmas pantomime returned for the first time in 29 years with Cinderella, produced and directed by Michael Harrison for Crossroads Pantomimes (previously Qdos Entertainment). The pantomimes have returned every year with performers including Julian Clary, Nigel Havers, Gary Wilmot, Paul Zerdin, Paul O'Grady, Dawn French, Ashley Banjo and Diversity, Elaine Paige, Charlie Stemp, Amanda Holden, Lee Mead, Matt Baker, Beverley Knight, Donny Osmond, The Tiller Girls, Alexandra Burke, Rob Madge, Natalie McQueen, Jennifer Saunders and Frances Mayli McCann. The 2017 pantomime Dick Whittington won the Laurence Olivier Award for Best Family Show. In March 2025, it was announced through the venue's social media that, to celebrate the 10th anniversary of the return of the Palladium Pantomime, the 2025/26 production would be Sleeping Beauty, starring Palladium panto veterans Clary, Havers and Zerdin, and introducing actress and comedienne Catherine Tate, comic impressionist Jon Culshaw, and West End stars Emily Lane (Hello Dolly!) and Amonik Melaco; the show will run for five weeks from 6 December 2025 until 11 January 2026, with tickets on-sale from 26 March (for priority booking) and 28 March 2025 (for general booking).

In 2017, The Wind in the Willows with songs by George Stiles and Anthony Drewe ran for a summer season starring Rufus Hound, Simon Lipkin, Neil McDermott, Gary Wilmot and Denise Welch.

In 2018, on the first anniversary of his death, Sir Bruce Forsyth's ashes were laid to rest under the Palladium's stage, with a blue plaque commemorating him on a nearby wall, featuring the description "Without question the UK's greatest entertainer, he rests in peace within the sound of music, laughter and dancing… exactly where he would want to be." For the 2018 summer season Bartlett Sher's Tony Award-winning revival of The King and I ran direct from Broadway starring Kelli O'Hara and Ken Watanabe reprising their roles as Anna and the King.

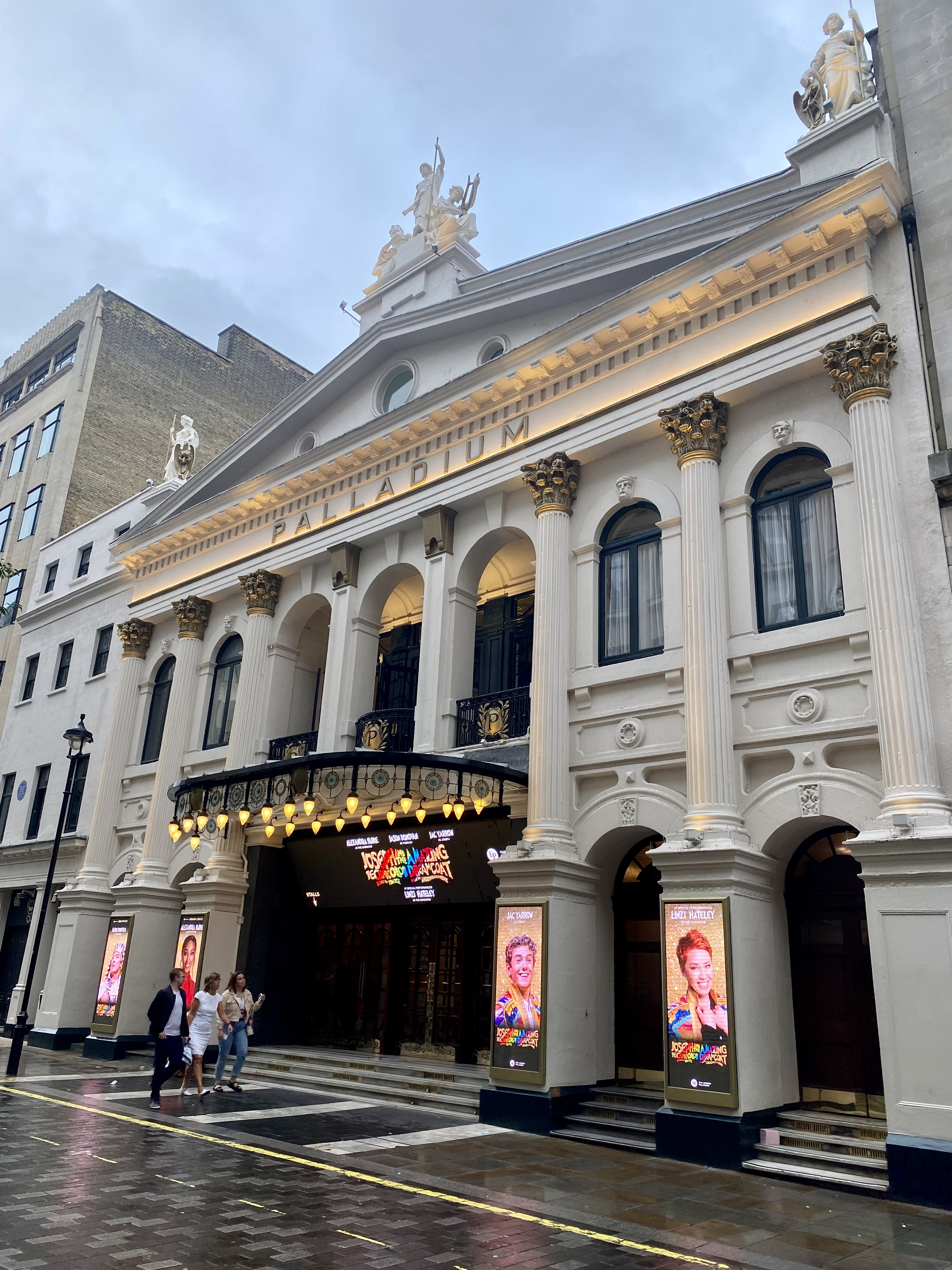
Joseph and the Amazing Technicolor Dreamcoat playing at the Palladium in August 2021

In summer 2019, the Palladium staged the 50th Anniversary production of Andrew Lloyd Webber's and Tim Rice’ Joseph and the Amazing Technicolor Dreamcoat. The production starred Sheridan Smith as the Narrator, Jason Donovan as the Pharaoh (having previously played the title role in the 1991 Palladium revival) and Jac Yarrow in the title role.

==== 2020s ====
The Dreamcoat production was due to return in summer 2020; however, due to the COVID-19 pandemic it was postponed to summer 2021. Donovan and Yarrow reprised their roles with Alexandra Burke as the Narrator with Linzi Hateley playing the Narrator at certain performances (reprising her role from the 1991 Palladium revival).

In 2022, Disney's Beauty and the Beast ran for a limited summer season following its UK and Ireland tour starring Courtney Stapleton, Martin Ball, Gavin Lee, and Sam Bailey.

In summer 2023, a new production of The Wizard of Oz was revived at the Palladium for a limited season starring Gary Wilmot as the Wizard, Ashley Banjo as the Tin Man, Jason Manford as the Cowardly Lion, Dianne Pilkington as the Wicked Witch of the West, Christina Bianco as Glinda, and Georgina Onuorah as Dorothy.

In summer 2024, a revival of Hello, Dolly! directed by Dominic Cooke, starring Imelda Staunton, Jenna Russell, Andy Nyman, and Tyrone Huntley ran for a limited season. As well as this, in July 2024 a concert by StarKid Productions: It's StarKid, Innit will be performed. Tickets for the concert sold out rapidly causing the concert to be the fastest-selling musical concert in the history of the venue.

Jamie Lloyd's 2019 production of Tim Rice and Andrew Lloyd Webber's Evita transferred to the Palladium for a limited season in the summer of 2025. Rachel Zegler played Eva Perón in the revival, which played from 14 June–6 September, 2025 with an official opening on 1 July. This production was notable for having the number "Don't Cry for Me Argentina" performed on the exterior balcony of the Palladium on Argyll Street and was broadcast to the theatre audience using cameras outside and a large screen inside the theatre; the large crowds on the street watching this balcony scene can be contextualized as part of Eva Peron's "spectacle and political theatre".

The Regent's Park Open Air Theatre production of Tim Rice and Andrew Lloyd Webber's Jesus Christ Superstar ran at the Palladium from 20 June until 5 September 2026, starring Sam Ryder as Jesus, before transferring to Theatre Royal Drury Lane.

The 2026 Ballon d'Or ceremony took place in the London Palladium, in celebration of the first winner of the award, Englishman Stanley Matthews. It is the first time in its 70-year history that the award was held in the English capital and Englishman Harry Kane won the award for the first time.

== Notable recent and present productions ==
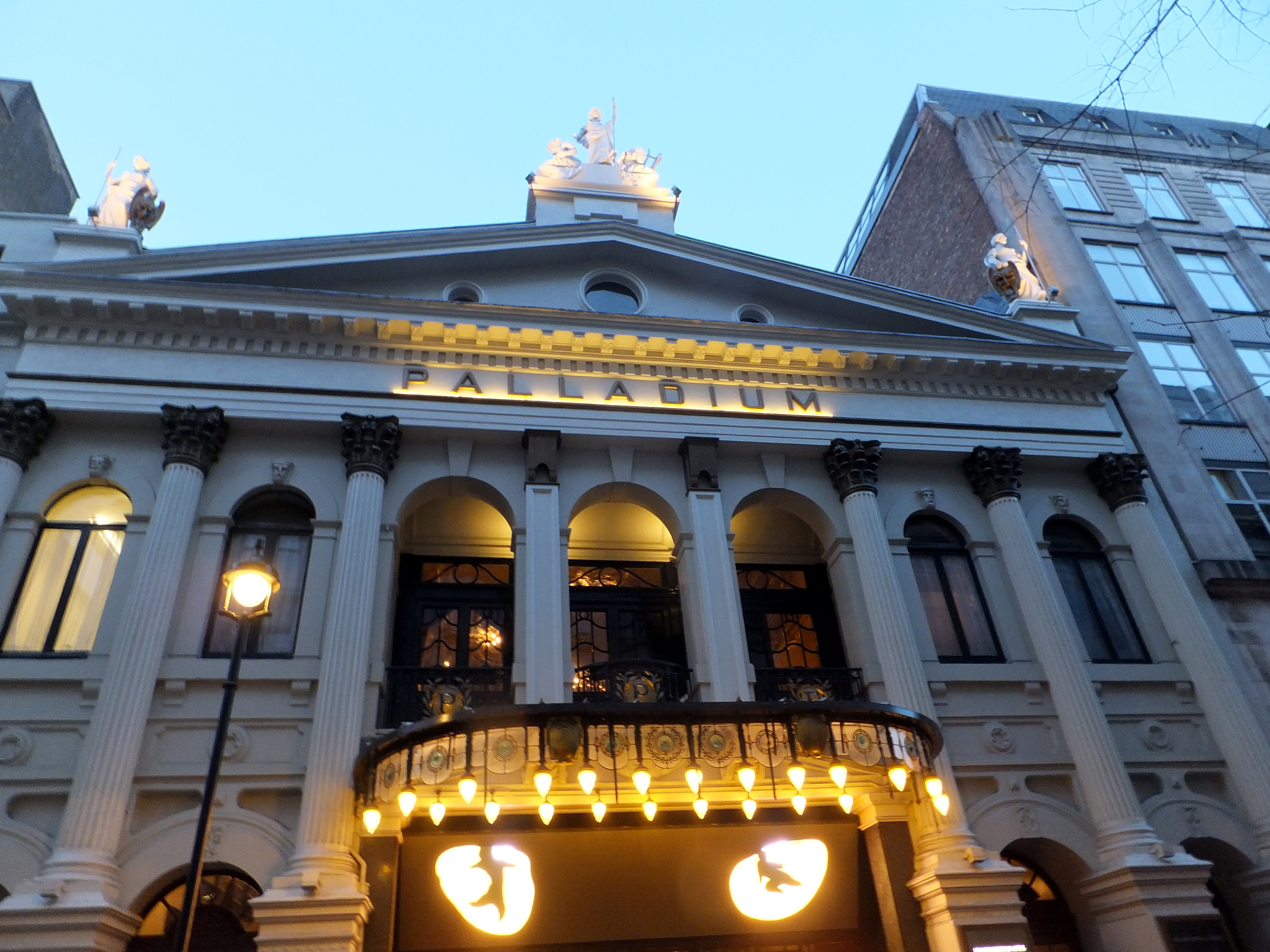
Cats (revival) at the Palladium in February 2015

=== Musicals ===
- 1991–93: Joseph and the Amazing Technicolor Dreamcoat
- 1994–98: Oliver!
- 1998–2000: Saturday Night Fever
- 2000–02: The King and I
- 2002–05: Chitty Chitty Bang Bang
- 2005–06: Scrooge The Musical
- 2006–09: The Sound of Music
- 2009–10: Sister Act the Musical
- 2011–12: The Wizard of Oz
- 2012–13: Scrooge The Musical
- 2013: A Chorus Line
- 2014: I Can't Sing!
- 2014–16: Cats
- 2017: The Wind in the Willows
- 2018: The King and I
- 2019: Joseph and the Amazing Technicolor Dreamcoat
- 2021: Joseph and the Amazing Technicolor Dreamcoat
- 2022: Beauty and the Beast
- 2023: The Wizard of Oz
- 2024: Hello, Dolly!
- 2025: Evita
- 2026: Jesus Christ Superstar

=== Concerts and one-night only shows ===
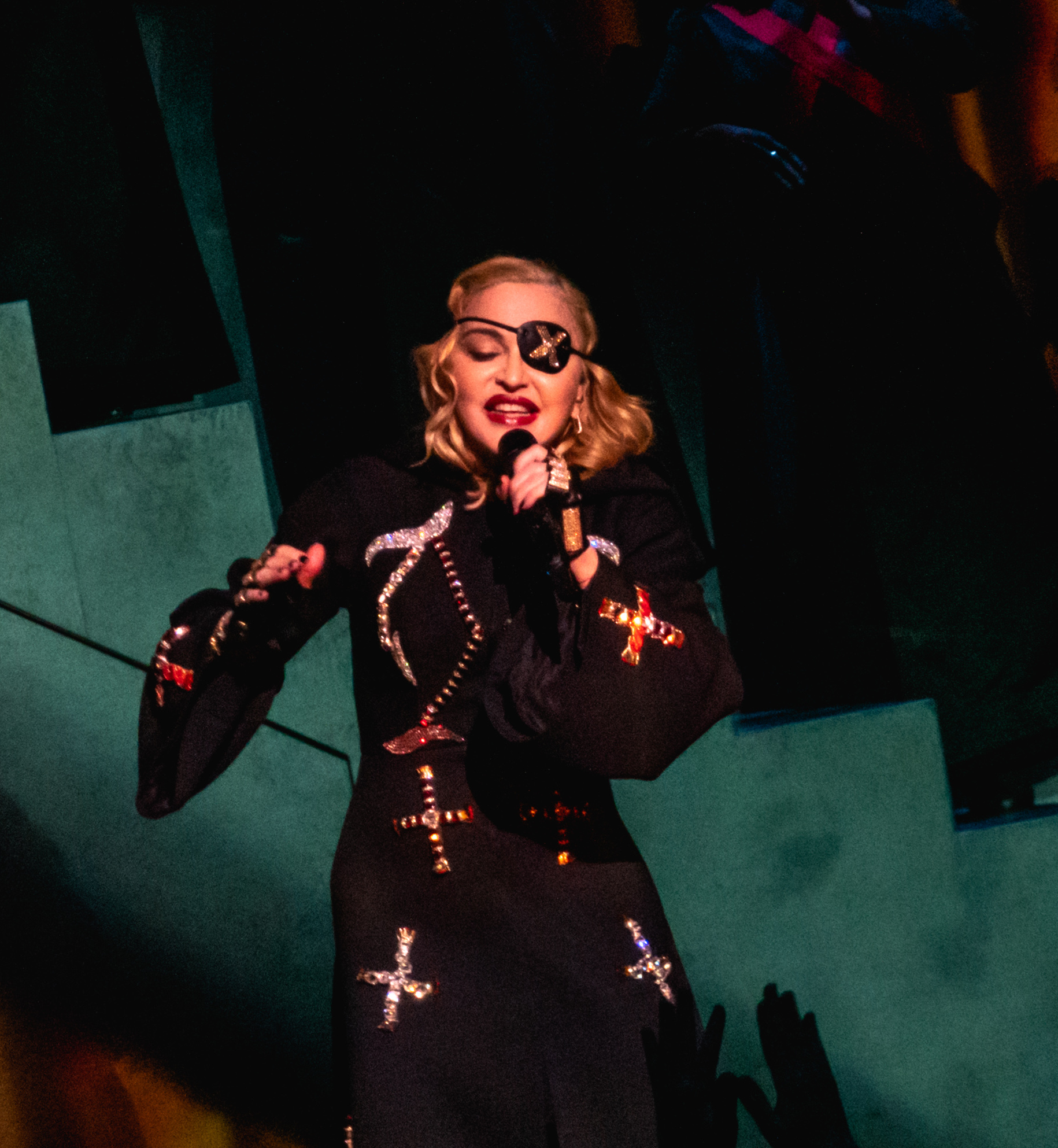
Madonna at the Palladium in February 2020 during her Madame X Tour

- 2016: Eugenius! by Ben Adams and Chris Wilkins, world premiere concert performance on 29 June. Produced by and starred Warwick Davis
- 16 July 2016: Ramin Karimloo: Live at the Palladium
- 2018: Camelot, starring David Thaxton
- 19 October 2019: Cradle of Filth's 20th Anniversary, playing Cruelty and the Beast in its entirety
- 29 October 2019: Opeth, In Cauda Venenum Tour
- January - February 2020: Madame X Tour Madonna
- 25 February 2020: Mick Fleetwood & Friends
- 2021: Hair, starring Tom Francis, Jodie Steele and Layton Williams
- 2021: "An Audience with... Adele" was filmed at the Palladium as part of her comeback for her album 30.
- 2022: Camelot, starring Ramin Karimloo, Lucy St. Louis and Bradley Jaden
- 2022: The Secret Garden, starring Hadley Fraser, Emma Williams and Mark Feehily
- 2022 October: Rough and Rowdy Ways tour by Bob Dylan
- 2023: Tailenders: The Live Show, starring Greg James, Felix White, and James Anderson
- 2023: Once, starring Carrie Hope Fletcher and Jamie Muscato
- 2023: Death Note: The Musical staging featuring Joaquin Pedro Valdes, Dean John-Wilson and Frances Mayli McCann. Music by Frank Wildhorn, lyrics by Jack Murphy and book by Ivan Menchell. English language premiere
- 2023: Darren Criss London Concert – featuring guest appearances from Lauren Lopez, Joey Richter, Clark Baxtresser and West End star Carrie Hope Fletcher
- 2024: The Addams Family, starring Ramin Karimloo, Michelle Visage and Lesley Joseph
- 2024: Aaron Tveit at the Palladium
- 2023: Darren Criss in London
- 2024: Cool Rider Live, 10th Anniversary Concert featuring Ashleigh Gray, Aaron Sidwell, Kitty Scott-Claus and original 'Grease 2' star Maxwell Caulfield as Mr Stuart
- 2024: Dirty Rotten Scoundrels, starring Hadley Fraser and Ramin Karimloo
- 2024: It's StarKid, Innit? - The debut UK performance of StarKid Productions. The fastest selling musical concert in London Palladium history
- 2025: Figaro: An Original Musical in its world premiere performance, starring Aimie Atkinson (Six) and Jon Robyns (Phantom of the Opera, Les Misérables)
- April 2025: Jeff Goldblum & The Mildred Snitzer Orchestra
- 2025: David Garrett “The Millennium Symphony” symphonic reinterpretations of songs from the past 25 years, blending classical music with pop, rock, R&B, and electronic styles
- 2025: Rachel Zegler
- 2026: One Night at the Palladium with Chris Moyles and Dominic Byrne
- 2026: The Last Five Years, starring Ben Platt and Rachel Zegler
- 2026: Love Never Dies, starring Jamie Muscato, Celinde Schoenmaker, Mazz Murray and George Blagden
- 2027: Falsettos, starring Christian Borle, Stephanie J. Block, Andrew Rannells, Brandon Uranowitz, and Betsy Wolfe

=== Christmas pantomimes ===
| Year | Production | Performance run | Main Cast | Supporting Cast |
|---|---|---|---|---|
| 2016/17 | Cinderella | 9 December 2016 - 15 January 2017 | Julian Clary, Paul Zerdin and Nigel Havers | Paul O'Grady, Amanda Holden, Lee Mead, Count Arthur Strong and Natasha Barnes |
| 2017/18 | Dick Whittington | 9 December 2017 - 14 January 2018 | Julian Clary, Paul Zerdin and Nigel Havers | Elaine Paige, Gary Wilmot, Ashley Banjo & Diversity, Charlie Stemp and Emma Williams |
| 2018/19 | Snow White | 8 December 2018 - 13 January 2019 | Julian Clary, Paul Zerdin and Nigel Havers | Dawn French, Wilmot, Stemp, Danielle Hope, Vincent Simone and Flavia Cacace |
| 2019/20 | Goldilocks and the Three Bears | 7 December 2019 - 12 January 2020 | Julian Clary, Paul Zerdin and Nigel Havers | O'Grady, Wilmot, Matt Baker, Janine Duvitski, Sophie Isaacs and Lauren Stroud |
| 2020 | Pantoland at the Palladium | 12–15 December 2020 (closed early due to COVID-19 pandemic) | Julian Clary, Paul Zerdin and Nigel Havers | Paige, Beverley Knight, Wilmot, Banjo & Diversity, Stemp and Jac Yarrow |
| 2021/22 | Pantoland at the Palladium | 4 December 2021 - 9 January 2022 | Julian Clary, Paul Zerdin and Nigel Havers | Donny Osmond, Wilmot, Isaacs, Yarrow and The Tiller Girls |
| 2022/23 | Jack and the Beanstalk | 10 December 2022 - 15 January 2023 | Julian Clary, Paul Zerdin and Nigel Havers | French, Alexandra Burke, Wilmot, Rob Madge, Natalie McQueen and Louis Gaunt |
| 2023/24 | Peter Pan | 9 December 2023 - 14 January 2024 | Julian Clary, Paul Zerdin and Nigel Havers | Jennifer Saunders, Wilmot, Madge, Frances Mayli McCann and Gaunt |
| 2024/25 | Robin Hood | 7 December 2024 - 12 January 2025 | Julian Clary, Paul Zerdin and Nigel Havers | Jane McDonald, Madge, Marisha Wallace, Tosh Wanogho-Maud and Stemp |
| 2025/26 | Sleeping Beauty | 6 December 2025 - 11 January 2026 | Julian Clary, Paul Zerdin and Nigel Havers | Catherine Tate, Madge, Emily Lane, Jon Culshaw and Amonik Melaco |
| 2026/27 | Cinderella | 5 December 2026 - 10 January 2027 | Julian Clary, Paul Zerdin and Nigel Havers | French, Saunders, Dex Lee, Hope Dawe and Madge |

== Notes ==
| Preceded by HKCEC | Miss World Venue; 1990 | Succeeded by GWCC |
