= Ted Keegan =

American actor and singer

- Born: December 21, 1961 (age 63)
- Occupation(s): Actor, singer
- Years active: 1988–present
- Known for: The Phantom of the Opera
- Partner: David Thiergartner (1984–present)

Ted Keegan is an American musical theatre actor who is most well known for playing the title role in The Phantom of the Opera across the United States for over 25 years.

== Career ==
Keegan's notable Broadway credits outside of The Phantom of the Opera include roles in Sweeney Todd: The Demon Barber of Fleet Street, Camelot, Cyrano: The Musical, and Pippin.

In 1999, Keegan was promoted from his usual role in The Phantom of the Opera on Broadway as Monsieur Reyer to principal Phantom as he replaced Hugh Panaro for a month before Howard McGillin took over. This made Keegan the twelfth principal Phantom on Broadway.

Also in 1999, Keegan started a 4-year stint in the 3rd US national tour as The Phantom before joining the Las Vegas company in 2006.

In 2010, Keegan played Monsieur André in the Broadway company of Phantom. He stayed with the Broadway company on and off for 10 years in many roles, while also being a Phantom understudy. He was a permanent member of the Broadway company as the Jeweller (Il Muto) from the first performance after the Covid-19 shutdown, October 22, 2021, until the final performance on April 16th, 2023. During the show's last two weeks, Keegan alternated in the title role with Jeremy Stolle and Laird Mackintosh while principal Phantom Ben Crawford was sick. His final performance as the Phantom was the April 15th matinee, making him the penultimate actor to play the role in the original Broadway production.

== Stage credits ==
Year(s)	Production	Role	Notes
1988	My Fair Lady	Freddy Eynsford-Hill	Regional
1989	Sweeney Todd: The Demon Barber of Fleet Street	Birdseller	Off-Broadway
1989–90	Sweeney Todd: The Demon Barber of Fleet Street	Birdseller / Ensemble s/b Anthony Hope	Broadway
1992–94	Camelot	Ensemble u/s Mordred	National tour
1993	Camelot	Ensemble u/s Mordred	Broadway
1993–94	Cyrano: The Musical	Swing	Broadway
1995	The Music Man	Ensemble	Regional
1995	Pippin	Singer	Broadway
1995–99	The Phantom of the Opera	Monsieur Reyer / Ensemble u/s The Phantom of the Opera u/s Monsieur André u/s Ubaldo Piangi	Broadway
1999	The Phantom of the Opera	The Phantom of the Opera	Broadway
1999–2002	The Phantom of the Opera	The Phantom of the Opera	National tour
2006	The Phantom of the Opera	Monsieur Reyer / Ensemble u/s The Phantom of the Opera	Las Vegas
2007	Jerry Springer: The Opera	Montel / Jesus	Las Vegas
2010	The Phantom of the Opera	Hairdresser / Monsieur Reyer u/s Monsieur André	Broadway
2010	The Phantom of the Opera	Monsieur André	Broadway
2013	The Phantom of the Opera	Passarino / Jeweler u/s The Phantom of the Opera	Broadway
2015	The Phantom of the Opera	Auctioneer / Fireman / Porter / Swing	Broadway
2016	The Phantom of the Opera	Monsieur Reyer / Passarino u/s Ubaldo Piangi	Broadway
2017–20	The Phantom of the Opera	u/s Ubaldo Piangi	Broadway
2018–20	The Phantom of the Opera	u/s The Phantom of the Opera	Broadway
2021-22	The Phantom of the Opera	u/s The Phantom of the Opera u/s Ubaldo Piangi	Broadway
2022–23	The Phantom of the Opera	Jeweler u/s The Phantom of the Opera u/s Ubaldo Piangi	Broadway
2023	The Phantom of the Opera	The Phantom of the Opera (Alternate)	Broadway
