= John Cudia =

- Born: September 21, 1970 (age 55); Toms River, New Jersey
- Occupation(s): Stage actor, singer
- Known for: The Phantom of the Opera
- Spouse: Kathy Voytko
- Website: www.johncudia.com

John Cudia is a classical tenor singer and a musical theatre actor who has played many of the biggest roles in musical theatre on Broadway.

Born on September 21, 1970, Cudia was raised in Toms River, New Jersey. He graduated from Monsignor Donovan High School (since renamed as Donovan Catholic High School).

Cudia began his career in regional theater. His credits include Jesus in Jesus Christ Superstar, Lieutenant Cable in South Pacific, Cinderella's Prince in Into the Woods, and Tony in West Side Story. His first role on Broadway was Feuilly in Les Misérables, he understudied Enjolras and later got promoted to Jean Valjean understudy. Cudia is noted for his critically acclaimed portrayals in Andrew Lloyd Webber's The Phantom of the Opera.

His first encounter with Phantom occurred when he was cast as a temporary swing in the U.S. touring production in 1999. There, he met Kathy Voytko, an alternate Christine, who is now his wife. Nine months later, he was given the role of Raoul in the touring cast. He played Raoul on Broadway for 3 years (2003–2005), where he was an understudy for The Phantom. Finally, he was cast as the "principal" Phantom in the U.S. touring production in 2006. Cudia stayed with the touring company until the spring of 2008 when he left to portray Valjean in the Marriott-Lincolnshire Theater's production of Les Misérables.

Cudia then returned to Phantom, this time playing the title role at Broadway's Majestic Theatre as a 10-week substitute for long-running Phantom Howard McGillin. Cudia played his first performance in the ten-week stint on May 22, 2008, and continued until McGillin returned on July 28, 2008. He then returned to The Phantom of the Opera national tour. He left the tour in May 2009 to celebrate the birth of his first child.

Cudia then became the "principal" Phantom at the Majestic Theatre, having taken over from Howard McGillin on July 27, 2009. He concluded his run as the Phantom on September 4, 2010, and was replaced by Hugh Panaro.

Cudia returned to Broadway when he joined the closing cast of the Broadway revival of Evita, understudying Juan Peron. In April 2016, he reprised the role of Peron in the Vancouver Opera production.

He made his Lyric Opera of Chicago debut as Curly in its production of Oklahoma!. He recently began his career as an operatic tenor.
