= Gary Mauer =

American actor

- Occupation: Stage actor
- Spouse: Elizabeth Southard
- Children: 2

Gary Mauer is an American theatre actor who most recently starred in the third national tour of The Phantom of the Opera playing the role of The Phantom. On Broadway, Gary has starred as Raoul, Vicomte de Chagny in The Phantom of the Opera from 1996 to 2001 and as Enjolras in Les Misérables from 1995 to 1996 (A role he reprised on tour). From 30 April 2007 through 19 May 2007, Gary filled in for Howard McGillin as The Phantom in The Phantom of the Opera on Broadway.

Gary has a B.F.A in Musical Theater from the University of Arizona in Tucson, and currently resides in New Jersey with his wife, actress Elizabeth Southard, and his two children: Nicholas and Eden. In 1998, he played Gaylord Ravenal in the tour of Show Boat. He can be heard on several CDs, including Bravo Broadway and Broadway's Fabulous Phantoms. In 2007, he recorded his own album, This Is the Moment, which includes "The Music of the Night", from The Phantom of the Opera, and "Bring Him Home", from Les Misérables. Gary is a lyric tenor who can currently be seen as part of the Bravo Broadway series in concerts throughout the United States with various symphonies. He has also appeared in numerous regional shows, including playing Jesus in Jesus Christ Superstar.
