= Brad Little (actor) =

American musical theatre actor (born 1964)

- Born: April 10, 1964 (age 62); United States
- Occupations: Actor, Singer
- Known for: The Phantom of the Opera
- Spouses: Barbara McCulloh (m. 1992–2013) Min Kyung Kim (김민경) (m. 2017)
- Website: www.bradlittle.com

Brad Little (born April 10, 1964) is an American musical theatre actor and baritone singer who has appeared in several Broadway and touring productions, most notably The Phantom of the Opera.

After several regional productions, one of which earned him a Barrymore Award for Best Actor in a Musical,he made his national debut in 1988 in the United States national tour of Anything Goes. The following year, he played the role of Perchik in the Broadway and national tour productions of Fiddler on the Roof; in 1993, he played Cpt. De Castel Jaloux in Cyrano: The Musical. He is known as the longest-running Phantom worldwide in Andrew Lloyd Webber’s musical The Phantom of the Opera.

From 1995 to 1997, Little joined the Broadway cast of Andrew Lloyd Webber's The Phantom of the Opera as Raoul, Vicomte de Chagny. From 1997 to 1999 and 2002 to 2004, he was in the musical's national tour in the title role of The Phantom. In September and October 2002, he temporarily replaced Howard McGillin as The Phantom on Broadway. From 2005 to 2007 and 2009, Little joined the World Tour cast of the musical which toured cities including Shanghai, Seoul, Taipei, Hong Kong, and Singapore. He returned to the role in the World Tour cast from 2012 to 2016 for the second and subsequent seasons in Seoul, Bangkok, Singapore and Shanghai, becoming the world's longest-running Phantom after his tour in Shanghai. He is one of the few actors who have played the role of The Phantom for over 2,000 performances.

In 2006, he had a solo concert in South Korea that was recorded and released in CD format. In 2009, he toured with Jekyll & Hyde in which he played the title roles. In 2010, he originated the role of Colonel Grayson in Frank Wildhorn's new musical Tears of Heaven which had its world premiere in South Korea. Also in 2010, he played Nick Arnstein in Funny Girl at the Wells Fargo Pavilion. In 2012, he was the understudy of Michael Cerveris as Juan Peron in the acclaimed Broadway revival production of Evita.

In Europe, he is known for starring as Jesus in Jesus Christ Superstar and as Tony in West Side Story. Other musicals include: Les Misérables (Javert), The Scarlet Pimpernel (Percy), Beauty and the Beast (The Beast), Evita (Che), Kiss Me, Kate (Fed/Petruchio), South Pacific (Lt. Cable), and The Who's Tommy (Capt. Walker), among others. He also most recently toured South Korea playing Old Deuteronomy in Cats.

Little was married to actress Barbara McCulloh but has since divorced and moved to South Korea.
