= Thomas O'Leary =

Thomas O'Leary may refer to:

- Thomas James O'Leary, American actor
- Thomas Michael O'Leary, American Roman Catholic bishop
- Tomás O'Leary, Irish rugby union player
