= Ciarán Sheehan =

Ciarán Sheehan may refer to:

- Ciarán Sheehan (dual player)
- Ciarán Sheehan (actor)
