= Laird Mackintosh =

Canadian actor (born 1968)

- Born: 3 September 1968 (age 58); Calgary, Alberta, Canada
- Occupations: Actor; dancer
- Years active: 1990–present
- Spouse: Polly Baird

Laird Mackintosh (born 3 September 1968 in Calgary, Alberta) is a Canadian actor based in New York City. He notably played the title role for the final performance of The Phantom of the Opera on Broadway.

== Career ==
He studied at École supérieure de ballet du Québec (Montreal), American Ballet Theatre's School of Classical Ballet in New York City, and The National Ballet School in Toronto. Mackintosh began his career as a dancer in the National Ballet of Canada (1990–1992). In 1993, he joined the Toronto (LivEnt) production of Andrew Lloyd Webber's The Phantom of the Opera in the role of Porter/Marksman and subsequently went on to play the leading role of Raoul, Vicomte de Chagny for three years and also understudy the role of the Phantom.

He performed with Toronto's Opera Atelier between 1997 and 2002. In 2002, Mackintosh joined the company of the Stratford Shakespeare Festival, appearing as Freddy Eynesford-Hill in My Fair Lady. He remained with the company for eight seasons, playing many leading roles. He has also played Robert in The Drowsy Chaperone (Vancouver), Phil Davis in White Christmas (Halifax), Prince Charming in Ross Petty's Cinderella (Toronto), Gustl in The Land of Smiles, Rapunzel's Prince in Into the Woods (Avon Theatre), and Algernon Moncrieff in Earnest, the Importance of Being (Toronto Operetta Theatre).

He played Nicky Goldberg in the independent film Songbird directed by Alex Boothby, Don Giovanni in Avenging Angelo (Sylvester Stallone/Warner Bros.), Young Anwyn Noble in Prince Charming (Martin Short/Hallmark) and Bob Kachler in Rad (Lori Loughlin/Taliafilm).

He made his Broadway debut in 2011 in the role of George Banks in Mary Poppins at the New Amsterdam Theater in New York City. He played Gabriel John Utterson in the 2013 Broadway revival of Jekyll & Hyde and James Wilson in the 2016 Encores! production of 1776.

On 26 August 2013, Mackintosh joined the Broadway cast of The Phantom of the Opera as Monsieur André and an understudy for The Phantom. On 5 May 2014, he started a one-week limited engagement as the Phantom between Hugh Panaro's departure and Norm Lewis' arrival. He concluded his limited run as the Phantom on 12 May. He also had limited runs as the Phantom from 25 December 2017 – 13 January 2018 (in between James Barbour's departure and Peter Joback's arrival) and from 2 – 14 April 2018 (in between Joback's departure and Ben Crawford's arrival). He continued to play Monsieur André until September 2019, when he left the production.

In December 2019, he joined the U.S. tour of My Fair Lady in the role of Henry Higgins. He temporarily returned to the production in October 2022 as a Phantom cover, then again from January to March in 2023, covering the roles of Monsieur Lefèvre/Firechief and understudying the role of the Phantom. He returned to the role for a charity performance on 14 April 2023, and he also played the role for the final two performances on 15 and 16 April 2023 while Ben Crawford was sick. This meant he became the final person to play the Phantom in the original Broadway production.

== Acting credits ==
=== Film ===
Year	Title	Role	Notes
1986	Rad	Bob Kachler	
2001	Prince Charming	Young Anwyn Noble	TV film
2002	Avenging Angelo	Don Giovanni	

=== Television ===
Year	Title	Role	Notes
2025	Law & Order	Logan Andrews	Episode: "Folk Hero"

=== Theatre ===
Year(s)	Production	Role(s)	Notes
1993–1994	The Phantom of the Opera	Porter / Marksman	Canada
1995–1999	The Phantom of the Opera	Raoul, Vicomte de Chagny u/s The Phantom of the Opera	Canada
2002	My Fair Lady	Freddy Eynesford-Hill	Stratford Festival
2002	The Threepenny Opera	Reverend Kimball	Stratford Festival
2003	Gigi	Manuel	Stratford Festival
2003	Love's Labour's Lost	Lord	Stratford Festival
2004	Anything Goes	Lord Evelyn Oakleigh	Stratford Festival
2005	Into the Woods	Rapunzel's Prince	Stratford Festival
2005	Hello, Dolly!	Cornelius Hackl	Stratford Festival
2007	To Kill a Mockingbird	Arthur "Boo" Radley	Stratford Festival
2008	The Music Man	Ewart Dunlop / Travelling Salesman	Stratford Festival
2009–2010	Mary Poppins	Policeman / Ensemble u/s Bert u/s George Banks u/s Northbrook u/s Park Keeper	North American tour
2010–2011	Mary Poppins	George Banks	North American tour
2011	Mary Poppins	George Banks	Broadway
2011–2012	Mary Poppins	George Banks	North American tour
2012–2013	Jekyll & Hyde	Gabriel John Utterson	US National Tour
2013	Jekyll & Hyde	Gabriel John Utterson	Broadway
2013–2014	The Phantom of the Opera	Monsieur Gilles André u/s The Phantom of the Opera	Broadway
2014	The Phantom of the Opera	The Phantom of the Opera	Broadway
2014–2016	The Phantom of the Opera	Monsieur Gilles André u/s The Phantom of the Opera	Broadway
2016	1776	James Wilson	Off-Broadway; Encores!
2016–2017	The Phantom of the Opera	Monsieur Gilles André u/s The Phantom of the Opera	Broadway
2017–2018	The Phantom of the Opera	The Phantom of the Opera	Broadway
2018	The Phantom of the Opera	Monsieur Gilles André u/s The Phantom of the Opera	Broadway
2018	The Phantom of the Opera	The Phantom of the Opera	Broadway
2018	The Phantom of the Opera	Monsieur Gilles André u/s The Phantom of the Opera	Broadway
2018	Titanic	J. Bruce Ismay	Regional
2018–2019	The Phantom of the Opera	Monsieur Gilles André u/s The Phantom of the Opera	Broadway
2019–2020	My Fair Lady	Professor Henry Higgins	US National Tour
2021–2022	My Fair Lady	Professor Henry Higgins	US National Tour
2023	The Phantom of the Opera	Monsieur Lefèvre / Firechief u/s The Phantom of the Opera	Broadway
2023	The Phantom of the Opera	The Phantom of the Opera	Broadway

== Personal life ==
Mackintosh is married to actress Polly Baird.
