= Ethan Freeman =

American actor

- Born: March 8, 1959 (age 67); Mount Vernon, New York, United States
- Education: Yale University
- Occupations: Actor, singer
- Known for: The Phantom of the Opera

Ethan Freeman (born March 8, 1959) is an American stage actor and singer based in Europe. He has performed in countries all around the world, most notably Germany, Austria, Canada, and in London's West End.

== Career ==
Freeman has played both the title role and André in the West End production of The Phantom of the Opera, he was the fifth principal actor to portray the Phantom in the West End production. He reprised the title role in Canadian, German, and Austrian productions.

He played Javert in the West End production of Les Misérables from 1997 to 1998. He was also featured in Les Misérables: The Dream Cast in Concert and Les Misérables in Concert: The 25th Anniversary.

He originated the roles of The Beast and Dr. Jekyll/Mr. Hyde in the Vienna production of Beauty and the Beast and the Bremen production of Jekyll & Hyde. He was replaced by Steve Barton in both productions.

He played the role of Kerchak in the Hamburg production of Tarzan.

Freeman originated the role of Jafar in the Hamburg and Stuttgart production of Aladdin.

== Theatre credits ==
He acted in the following shows:

Year	Show	Role	Location	Country	Notes
1987	Cats	Bustopher Jones / Gus / Growltiger	Hamburg	Germany	
1988–1990	The Phantom of the Opera	The Phantom of the Opera	Vienna	Austria	National premiere
1991-1992	The Phantom of the Opera	Monsieur Gilles André	London	United Kingdom	West End
1992–1993	Elisabeth	Luigi Lucheni	Vienna	Austria	World premiere
1993	Candide	Maximilian	Innsbruck		
1993–1995	The Phantom of the Opera	The Phantom of the Opera	London	United Kingdom	West End
1994	Kismet	Haj the Poet	London	United Kingdom	BBC Concert performance
1994	Jesus Christ Superstar	Pontius Pilate	-	-	Studio Cast Album
1995–1996	Beauty and the Beast	The Beast	Vienna	Austria	European premiere
1995	Les Misérables: The Dream Cast in Concert	Ensemble	London	United Kingdom	Royal Albert Hall
1996–1997	The Phantom of the Opera	The Phantom of the Opera	Toronto, Ontario	Canada	National premiere
1997–1998	Les Misérables	Inspector Javert	London	United Kingdom	West End
1998	Porgy and Bess	Detective	BBC Night of the Proms	United Kingdom	Royal Albert Hall
1998	Kurt Weill Der Weg der Verheissung	Pashur	BBC Night of the Proms	United Kingdom	Royal Albert Hall
1999–2000	Jekyll & Hyde	Dr. Henry Jekyll / Mr. Edward Hyde	Bremen	Germany	National premiere
2000	One Touch of Venus	Withlaw Savory	West End	United Kingdom	London
2000	Jesus Christ Superstar	Pontius Pilate	Tecklenburg, North Rhine-Westphalia	Germany	
2003	Cats	Bustopher Jones / Gus / Growltiger	Berlin	Germany	
2004	Evita	Che	Bremen	Germany	
2005–2006	Robin Hood - For Love and Justice	Sheriff of Nottingham	Bremen	Germany	World premiere
2006	The Phantom of the Opera	The Phantom of the Opera	Essen	Germany	
2006–2007	3 Musketiere	Kardinal Richelieu	Stuttgart	Germany	
2010	Les Misérables in Concert: The 25th Anniversary	Choir	London	United Kingdom	O2 Arena
2011–2013	Tarzan	Kerchak	Hamburg	Germany	National premiere
2015–2019	Aladdin	Jafar	Hamburg	Germany	National premiere
