= Steve Barton =

American actor and singer (1954–2001)

- Born: June 26, 1954; Hot Springs, Arkansas, U.S.
- Died: July 21, 2001 (aged 47); Bremen, Germany
- Education: University of Texas at Austin
- Occupations: Actor; singer; dancer; teacher; choreographer; stage director; pianist
- Known for: Raoul and the title role in The Phantom of the Opera; Graf von Krolock in Dance of the Vampires
- Spouse: Denny Berry
- Children: 1

Steven Neal Barton (June 26, 1954 – July 21, 2001) was an American actor, singer, dancer, teacher, choreographer, and stage director. He worked internationally in the United States, London, Germany, Austria, and Switzerland. He is most well known for originating the role of Raoul, Vicomte de Chagny in the West End and Broadway productions of Andrew Lloyd Webber’s The Phantom of the Opera, and later taking over the title role of The Phantom of the Opera in the Broadway production. He also originated the starring role of Graf von Krolock in Dance of the Vampires.

== Early life and education ==
Barton was born on June 26, 1954, in Hot Springs, Arkansas, the youngest of three children of Tom and Mary Barton. He was raised in Nederland, Texas.

He won a scholarship to the University of Texas at Austin (UT), where he majored in theater, dance and voice, and appeared in over 30 productions with UT and the Ballet of Austin. A UT endowed Presidential Scholarship is now named for him. After graduation he went to Europe.

== Career ==
He landed his first professional role in St. Gallen, Switzerland, then performed in several major Swiss, German and Austrian theater companies.

He played leading roles in West Side Story, Godspell, Romeo and Juliet, The Fantasticks, The Threepenny Opera, Oklahoma!, Jesus Christ Superstar, Evita, Guys and Dolls, and Camelot, before playing the role of Munkustrap in the original Vienna cast of Cats, at the Theater an der Wien. At the Theater des Westens in Berlin he played roles in Guys and Dolls, Jesus Christ Superstar (as Jesus), La Cage aux Folles (as both Jean Michel and Albin/Zaza) and Robert in Company.

In 1986, Barton originated the role of Raoul, Vicomte de Chagny in Andrew Lloyd Webber's The Phantom of the Opera in London. He also understudied the title role and notably played the role when Michael Crawford was sick in April 1987. In 1988, he reprised the role of Raoul in the original Broadway cast. In 1989, Barton reprised his performance as Raoul opposite Crawford's Phantom in the previews and opening night performance of the Ahmanson Theatre production of the show when principal Raoul actor Reece Holland was injured. Barton took over the role of The Phantom in 1990 from Cris Groenendaal in the Broadway production; he was the fourth principal actor to portray the role on Broadway.

In 1996, Barton returned to Vienna, where he took over the part of The Beast in Disney's Beauty and the Beast. He originated the role of Graf von Krolock, a vampire in Jim Steinman's Dance of the Vampires, for which he won an IMAGE (International Music Award Germany) in 1998. Barton celebrated his 30-year onstage anniversary in 1997 during his run as von Krolock.

At the end of his life he was working on Jekyll & Hyde in Bremen, Germany. He was taking over the title role from Ethan Freeman.

== Personal life ==
Barton was married to swing dancer and choreographer Denny Berry, who served as dance supervisor for the North American productions of The Phantom of the Opera, whom he met at college. Their son, Edward, was born in Vienna in 1984; the couple separated at an unspecified later date. He was an honorary chairperson of the Steadman Hawkins Sports Medicine Foundation and an honorary member of the UTA Board of Education.

== Death ==
Barton died in his sleep at his Bremen, Germany, apartment on July 21, 2001, aged 47. While his death was initially attributed to heart failure, according to obituary information released by the press office for the New York production of The Phantom of the Opera, it was later ruled a suicide by the Bremen district attorney.

== Stage roles ==
Theatre credits
Year	Title	Role	Notes
1971	Hello, Dolly!	Barnaby Tucker	Texas, US
1972	West Side Story	Tony	Texas, US
1972	Camelot	Sir Lancelot du Lac	Music Director; Texas, US
1973	Romeo and Juliet	Paris	Texas, US
1975	Romeo and Juliet	Romeo Montague	Choreographer; Texas, US
1976	The Threepenny Opera	Captain MacHeath	Texas, US
1977	Macbeth	Macduff	Texas, US
1979	West Side Story	Riff	Bern, Switzerland
1979	Cinderella	Prince Charming	Assistant Choreographer; Bern, Switzerland
1980	West Side Story	Riff	Bern, Switzerland
1981	The Fantasticks	El Gallo	Bern, Switzerland
1981	West Side Story	Riff	Berlin, Germany
1981	Romeo and Juliet	Tybalt	Choreographer; Bern, Switzerland
1981	West Side Story	Riff	Bern, Switzerland
1981	West Side Story	Riff	Bregenz, Austria
1981	Camelot	Sir Lancelot du Lac	Choreographer; Karlsruhe, Germany
1982	Oklahoma!	Curly McLain	Berlin, Germany
1982	Godspell	Jesus	Bern, Switzerland
1982	Camelot	Sir Lancelot du Lac	Ludwigshafen, Germany
1982	Godspell	Jesus	Olten, Switzerland
1982	West Side Story	Riff	Vienna, Austria
1982	Jesus Christ Superstar	Peter	Vienna, Austria
1982	Jesus Christ Superstar	Jesus Christ	Vienna, Austria
1983	Evita	Agustín Magaldi	München, Germany
1983–1984	Cats	Munkustrap	Dance Captain; Vienna, Austria
1984	Jesus Christ Superstar	Jesus Christ	Berlin, Germany
1985	Guys and Dolls	Nicely-Nicely Johnson	Berlin, Germany
1985	Guys and Dolls	Sky Masterson	Berlin, Germany
1985	La Cage aux Folles	Jean Michel	Berlin, Germany
1986	La Cage aux Folles	Albin	Berlin, Germany
1986	Company	Robert	Berlin, Germany
1986-1987	The Phantom of the Opera	Raoul, Vicomte de Chagny u/s The Phantom of the Opera	Original West End cast
1987	The Phantom of the Opera	The Phantom of the Opera	Temporary West End replacement
1987	The Phantom of the Opera	Raoul, Vicomte de Chagny u/s The Phantom of the Opera	Original West End cast
1988–1989	The Phantom of the Opera	Raoul, Vicomte de Chagny	Original Broadway cast
1989	The Phantom of the Opera	Raoul, Vicomte de Chagny	Los Angeles
1989	The Phantom of the Opera	Raoul, Vicomte de Chagny	Original Broadway cast
1989	The Anastasia Affaire	Prince Paul	Massachusetts, US
1990	The Phantom of the Opera	The Phantom of the Opera	Broadway production replacement
1991	The Threepenny Opera	Captain Macheath	New Jersey, US
1991	The Phantom of the Opera	Raoul, Vicomte de Chagny u/s The Phantom of the Opera	Los Angeles
1993	Six Wives	Henry VIII	New York, US
1993	The Hunchback of Notre Dame	Quasimodo	New York, US
1993	The Phantom of the Opera	Raoul, Vicomte de Chagny u/s The Phantom of the Opera	Los Angeles
1993	The Red Shoes	Boris Lermontov	Original Broadway cast
1994	Kiss Me, Kate	Fred Graham / Petruchio	Goodspeed Opera House
1996	Sweeney Todd: The Demon Barber of Fleet Street	Sweeney Todd	Pennsylvania, US
1996	Let's Do It	Nick Cameron	Connecticut, US
1996-1997	Beauty and the Beast	The Beast	Vienna, Austria replacement
1997-2000	Dance of the Vampires	Graf von Krolock	Original cast
2000	Jekyll & Hyde	Dr. Henry Jekyll / Edward Hyde	Bremen, Germany

== Television guest roles ==
- Tatort, 1992, guest role as FBI Agent Mike Haller, ORF, Austria
- The Young and the Restless, 1994, guest role and Another World, 1994, guest role as Bailey Thompson

== Selected discography ==
=== Musicals ===
- 1983: Cats, Original Vienna Cast Recording, as Munkustrap, in German language
- 1987: Highlights from The Phantom of the Opera, Original London Cast, as Raoul
- 1987: The Phantom of the Opera, Original London Cast Recording, as Raoul
- 1988: Show Boat, as Steve Baker
- 1998: Anastasia - The Musical, as Prince Paul
- 1998: Tanz der Vampire – Die Höhepunkte der Welturaufführung, Original Vienna Cast, as Graf von Krolock, in German language
- 1998: Tanz der Vampire – Die Gesamtaufnahme, Original Vienna Cast Recording, as Graf von Krolock, in German language

=== Guest appearances ===
- 1985: Angelika Milster - Meisterstücke, 2 duets
- 1998: Paul Schwartz's Aria, Vol. 2 - New Horizon, vocals on Leiermann
- 2002: Sarah Brightman - Encore, duet on "Think of Me"

=== Other recordings ===
- 1991: Cole Porter Centennial Gala Concert
- 1995: Living Water, duets with Mother Teresa and Brian Sutherland
- 1999: Danke - Songs und Lieder zum Kirchentag 1999, includes the song "Reach Out", a duet with Brian Sutherland
- 2002: Steve Barton – Memorial Concert, "Simply Flying" and "Somewhere Over The Rainbow"
- 2004: Broadway's Fabulous Phantoms, "I've Got You Under My Skin"
- 2009: Only for a While, compilation
- 2010: Encore: The Private Collection, compilation of outtakes, demos and rehearsals

== See also ==
- Mirette on the High Wire
