= The Phantom of the Opera (original London cast recording) =

Cast recording by the original London cast
- Released: 1987
- Label: Polydor

The Phantom of the Opera, subtitled Original Cast Recording, is a double album containing a recording of the musical The Phantom of the Opera made by its original 1986 West End, London, cast. The album was released by Polydor in 1987. A shorter, single-disc "Highlights" version was also available.

A newly remixed and expanded version of the 1986 original London cast recording was released on October 9, 2026, coinciding with the show's 40th-anniversary gala at His Majesty's Theatre, London.

== Background ==
The album was produced by Andrew Lloyd Webber.

== Critical reception ==
Professional ratings
Review scores
| Source | Rating |
|---|---|
| AllMusic | 4.5/5 stars |

Professional ratings
Highlights from the Phantom of the Opera
Review scores
| Source | Rating |
|---|---|
| AllMusic | 4.5/5 stars |

In a retrospective review, AllMusic rates both the 2-disc and the 1-disc "Highlights" versions of the album 4.5 on a scale of 5.

== Track listing ==
=== 1987 double-album version ===
2 × LP – Polydor PODV9

Side 1
| No. | Title | Length |
|---|---|---|
| 1. | "Prologue: The Stage of the Paris Opéra, 1905" | 1:54 |
| 2. | "Overture" "Act One: Paris 1861" | 3:05 |
| 3. | "Think of Me" | 4:09 |
| 4. | "Angel of Music" | 2:20 |
| 5. | "Little Lotte... / The Mirror... (Angel of Music)" | 2:49 |
| 6. | "The Phantom of the Opera" | 5:02 |
| 7. | "The Music of the Night" | 5:41 |
| 8. | "I Remember... / Stranger Than You Dreamt It..." | 3:21 |

Side 2
| No. | Title | Length |
|---|---|---|
| 1. | "Magical Lasso..." | 0:59 |
| 2. | "Notes... / Prima Donna" | 10:55 |
| 3. | "Poor Fool, He Makes Me Laugh" | 3:06 |
| 4. | "Why Have You Brought Me Here... / Raoul, I've Been There..." | 3:11 |
| 5. | "All I Ask of You" | 4:14 |
| 6. | "All I Ask of You" (Reprise) | 3:19 |

Side 3
| No. | Title | Length |
|---|---|---|
| 1. | "Entr'acte" "Act Two: Six Months Later" | 3:35 |
| 2. | "Masquerade / Why So Silent..." | 6:24 |
| 3. | "Notes... / Twisted Every Way..." | 9:41 |
| 4. | "Wishing You Were Somehow Here Again" | 3:30 |
| 5. | "Wandering Child... / Bravo, Monsieur..." | 6:26 |

Side 4
| No. | Title | Length |
|---|---|---|
| 1. | "The Point of No Return" | 5:33 |
| 2. | "Down Once More... / Track Down This Murderer..." | 11:51 |

=== 1987 "Highlights" version ===
1 × LP – Polydor POLH 33

Side 1
| No. | Title | Length |
|---|---|---|
| 1. | "Overture" (Edit) | 2:07 |
| 2. | "Think of Me" (Edit) | 3:09 |
| 3. | "Angel of Music" | 2:20 |
| 4. | "The Mirror (Angel of Music)" | 1:57 |
| 5. | "The Phantom of the Opera" (Edit) | 4:17 |
| 6. | "The Music of the Night" | 5:12 |
| 7. | "Prima Donna" | 3:48 |
| 8. | "All I Ask of You" (Edit) | 4:04 |
| 9. | "All I Ask of You" (Reprise) | 2:35 |

Side 2
| No. | Title | Length |
|---|---|---|
| 1. | "Entr'acte" | 2:40 |
| 2. | "Masquerade" | 5:27 |
| 3. | "Wishing You Were Somehow Here Again" (Edit) | 3:05 |
| 4. | "The Point of No Return" | 4:57 |
| 5. | "Down Once More... / Track Down This Murderer..." | 13:35 |

=== 2026 remix version ===
3 × LP

Side 1
| No. | Title | Length |
|---|---|---|
| 1. | "Prologue" (The Andrew Lloyd Webber 2026 Mix) | 1:55 |
| 2. | "Overture" (The Andrew Lloyd Webber 2026 Mix) | 2:07 |
| 3. | "Hannibal Rehearsal" (The Andrew Lloyd Webber 2026 Mix) | 5:50 |
| 4. | "Think of Me" (The Andrew Lloyd Webber 2026 Mix) | 3:10 |
| 5. | "Angel of Music ()" (The Andrew Lloyd Webber 2026 Mix) | 2:20 |
| 6. | "Little Lotte / The Mirror (Angel of Music)" (The Andrew Lloyd Webber 2026 Mix) | 2:50 |

Side 2
| No. | Title | Length |
|---|---|---|
| 1. | "The Phantom of the Opera" (The Andrew Lloyd Webber 2026 Mix) | 4:16 |
| 2. | "I Have Brought You" (The Andrew Lloyd Webber 2026 Mix) | 0:47 |
| 3. | "The Music of the Night" (The Andrew Lloyd Webber 2026 Mix) | 5:10 |
| 4. | "I Remember / Stranger Than You Dreamt It" (The Andrew Lloyd Webber 2026 Mix) | 3:51 |
| 5. | "Magical Lasso" (The Andrew Lloyd Webber 2026 Mix) | 0:59 |
| 6. | "Notes" (The Andrew Lloyd Webber 2026 Mix) | 6:29 |

Side 3
| No. | Title | Length |
|---|---|---|
| 1. | "Prima Donna" (The Andrew Lloyd Webber 2026 Mix) | 3:42 |
| 2. | "Il Muto" (The Andrew Lloyd Webber 2026 Mix) | 3:34 |
| 3. | "Why Have You Brought Me Here" (The Andrew Lloyd Webber 2026 Mix) | 3:27 |
| 4. | "All I Ask of You" (The Andrew Lloyd Webber 2026 Mix) | 4:14 |
| 5. | "All I Ask of You – Reprise" (The Andrew Lloyd Webber 2026 Mix) | 3:21 |
| 6. | "Entr'acte / Six Months Later" (The Andrew Lloyd Webber 2026 Mix) | 3:02 |

Side 4
| No. | Title | Length |
|---|---|---|
| 1. | "Masquerade / Why So Silent" (The Andrew Lloyd Webber 2026 Mix) | 6:39 |
| 2. | "Notes / Twisted Every Way" (The Andrew Lloyd Webber 2026 Mix) | 9:44 |
| 3. | "Wishing You Were Somehow Here Again" (The Andrew Lloyd Webber 2026 Mix) | 3:30 |
| 4. | "Wandering Child / Bravo Monsieur" (The Andrew Lloyd Webber 2026 Mix) | 2:45 |

Side 5
| No. | Title | Length |
|---|---|---|
| 1. | "Don Juan Triumphant" (The Andrew Lloyd Webber 2026 Mix) | 3:36 |
| 2. | "The Point of No Return" (The Andrew Lloyd Webber 2026 Mix) | 5:33 |
| 3. | "Down Once More / Track Down This Murderer" (The Andrew Lloyd Webber 2026 Mix) | 1:30 |
| 4. | "Have You Gorged Yourself" (The Andrew Lloyd Webber 2026 Mix) | 10:23 |

Side 6
| No. | Title | Length |
|---|---|---|
| 1. | "Andrew's Phantom Demo" (The Andrew Lloyd Webber 2026 Mix) | 3:58 |
| 2. | "Box Five" (The Andrew Lloyd Webber 2026 Mix) | 4:44 |
| 3. | "Masquerade Original Demo" (The Andrew Lloyd Webber 2026 Mix) | 3:29 |

== Charts ==
| Chart (1987–93) | Peak position |
|---|---|
| Australian Albums (ARIA) | 2 |
| Austrian Albums (Ö3 Austria) | 2 |
| Dutch Albums (Album Top 100) | 59 |
| New Zealand Albums (RMNZ) | 1 |
| Swedish Albums (Sverigetopplistan) | 5 |

=== Highlights from the Phantom of the Opera ===
| Chart (1989) | Peak position |
|---|---|
| Austrian Albums (Ö3 Austria) | 3 |
| New Zealand Albums (RMNZ) | 4 |
| Chart (1996) | Peak position |
| Swiss Albums (Schweizer Hitparade) | 14 |

== Certifications ==
| Region | Certification | Certified units/sales |
|---|---|---|
| United States (RIAA) | 4× Platinum | 4,000,000^{^} |
^{^} Shipments figures based on certification alone.

=== Highlights from the Phantom of the Opera ===
| Region | Certification | Certified units/sales |
|---|---|---|
| United States (RIAA) | 4× Platinum | 4,000,000^{^} |
^{^} Shipments figures based on certification alone.
