= The Phantom of the Opera (musical) =

1986 musical by Andrew Lloyd Webber

- Poster
- Music: Andrew Lloyd Webber
- Lyrics: Charles Hart; Richard Stilgoe (additional)
- Book: Richard Stilgoe; Andrew Lloyd Webber
- Basis: The Phantom of the Opera by Gaston Leroux
- Premiere: 9 October 1986; 40 years ago: Her Majesty's Theatre, London
- Productions: 1985: 1st performance at Sydmonton; 1986 West End; 1988 Broadway; 1989 US tour (Christine Tour); 1990 US tour (Raoul Tour); 1993 US tour (Music Box Tour); 1993 UK tour; 1999 UK tour; 2012 UK tour; 2013 North American tour; 2019 World tour; 2020 UK tour; 2024 World tour; 2025 Off-Broadway; 2025 North American tour
- Awards: 1986 Laurence Olivier Award for Best New Musical; 1986 Evening Standard Theatre Award for Best New Musical; 1988 Tony Award for Best Musical; 1988 Outer Critics Circle Award for Best Broadway Musical

The Phantom of the Opera is a musical with music by Andrew Lloyd Webber, lyrics by Charles Hart, additional lyrics by Richard Stilgoe, and a libretto by Lloyd Webber and Stilgoe. Based on the 1910 novel by Gaston Leroux, it tells the tragic story of beautiful soprano Christine Daaé, who becomes the obsession of a mysterious and disfigured musical genius living in the subterranean labyrinth beneath the Paris Opera House.

The musical opened in London's West End in 1986 and on Broadway in New York in 1988, in a production directed by Harold Prince and starring English classical soprano Sarah Brightman (Lloyd Webber's then-wife) as Christine Daaé, screen and stage star Michael Crawford as the Phantom, and international stage performer Steve Barton as Raoul. It won the 1986 Olivier Award and the 1988 Tony Award for Best Musical, with Crawford winning the Olivier and Tony for Best Actor in a Musical. A film adaptation, directed by Joel Schumacher, was released in 2004.

The Phantom of the Opera is the longest running show in Broadway history, and celebrated its 10,000th performance on 11 February 2012, becoming the first Broadway production in history to do so. It is the second longest-running West End musical, after Les Misérables, and the third longest-running West End show overall, after The Mousetrap. With total estimated worldwide gross receipts of over $6 billion and total Broadway gross of over $1 billion, The Phantom of the Opera was the most financially successful entertainment event until The Lion King surpassed it in 2014. By 2019, it had been seen by over 140 million people in 183 cities across 41 countries.

The original West End production at His Majesty's Theatre, London, suspended performances in March 2020 due to the shutdown of theatres resulting from the COVID-19 pandemic. A scaled-down, revised staging reopened in the same theatre in July 2021, with a "smaller orchestra and redesigned set". The original Broadway production played its final performance on 16 April 2023.

== Synopsis ==
=== Prologue ===
In 1919, the Paris Opéra House hosts an auction of theatre memorabilia. Among the attendees is Raoul de Chagny, who purchases Lot 665, a papier-mâché music box with a monkey figurine. He cryptically observes that it appears "exactly as she said". The next lot – Lot 666 – is a broken chandelier, portions of which have been renovated with electrical wiring. The auctioneer states that this chandelier was involved in a famous disaster, connected to "the strange affair of the Phantom of the Opera, a mystery never fully explained". He commands the auction assistants to turn on the chandelier. As the overture plays, the chandelier flickers to life and ascends to the ceiling, a transition back in time restoring the opera house to its former grandeur ("Overture").

=== Act I ===
In 1881, the cast of a new production, Hannibal, is rehearsing ("Hannibal Rehearsal"). Carlotta, the Opéra's resident soprano prima donna, begins performing an aria when a backdrop falls from the flies, causing anxious chorus girls to shout, "He's here! The Phantom of the Opera!" The new owners, Firmin and André, downplay the incident, but Carlotta storms offstage. Madame Giry, the Opéra's ballet mistress, suggests that Christine Daaé, a chorus girl and orphaned daughter of a prominent Swedish violinist, has been "well taught" and can sing Carlotta's role. As their only alternative is cancelling the show, the managers audition her, and discover that she is indeed talented. As Christine sings the aria during the evening performance, the Opéra's new patron, Raoul, Vicomte de Chagny, recognizes her as his childhood friend and playmate ("Think of Me").

Michael Crawford and Sarah Brightman performing the title song

Backstage after her triumphant debut, Christine confesses to her friend, Madame Giry's daughter Meg, that her singing has been inspired by an unseen tutor she knows only as the "Angel of Music" ("Angel of Music"). Raoul visits Christine in her dressing room and the two reminisce about "Angel of Music" stories that her father used to tell them. Christine confides that the Angel has visited her and taught her to sing ("Little Lotte"). Raoul indulges what he assumes are fantasies and insists on taking Christine to dinner. When Raoul leaves to fetch his hat, Christine hears the Phantom's voice and entreats him to reveal himself. The Phantom appears in her mirror ("The Mirror/Angel of Music (Reprise)"). Christine is hypnotized and drawn through the mirror to the Phantom, who leads her into the shadowy sewers below the Opéra house. The two board a small boat and cross a subterranean lake to his lair ("The Phantom of the Opera"). The Phantom explains that he has chosen Christine to sing his musical compositions ("I Have Brought You"). A mirror reflects an image of her in a wedding dress; when the mirror image spreads its arms towards the real Christine, she faints. The Phantom lays her on a bed and covers her with his cloak ("The Music of the Night").

As the Phantom composes music at his organ, Christine awakens to the sound of the monkey music box ("I Remember"). She slips behind the Phantom, lifts his mask, and beholds his disfigured face. The Phantom rails at her prying, then ruefully expresses his longing to be loved ("Stranger Than You Dreamt It"). Moved by pity, Christine returns the mask to the Phantom, and he escorts her back above ground.

Joseph Buquet, the Opéra's chief stagehand, regales the ballet girls with tales of the "Opéra Ghost" and his terrible Punjab lasso. Madame Giry warns Buquet to restrain himself ("Magical Lasso"). Arguments break out in the managers' office between Firmin, André, Raoul, and Carlotta over notes sent by the Phantom, including a demand that Christine replace Carlotta in the starring role of the new opera, Il Muto ("Notes"). Firmin and André assure Carlotta that she will remain the star ("Prima Donna").

The première of Il Muto goes well until the Phantom enchants Carlotta's voice, reducing it to a frog-like croak. Firmin rushes to defuse the situation by announcing to the audience that Christine will take over the starring role; he instructs the conductor to bring the ballet forward to keep the audience entertained. Buquet's corpse drops from the rafters, hanging from the Punjab lasso. Mayhem erupts and the Phantom's sinister laugh is heard throughout the auditorium ("Poor Fool, He Makes Me Laugh").

Christine escapes with Raoul to the rooftop and tells him about her encounter with the Phantom ("Why Have You Brought Me Here?/Raoul, I've Been There"). Raoul promises to love and protect her ("All I Ask of You"). The Phantom, who overheard their conversation, is heartbroken and swears revenge. In the auditorium, the chandelier crashes onto the stage during the Il Muto curtain call ("All I Ask of You (Reprise)").

=== Act II ===
Steve Barton and Sarah Brightman in the final scene

Six months later, the Opera house hosts a masquerade ball. The Phantom, who has been absent since the chandelier disaster, appears in costume as the Red Death. He announces that he has written an opera entitled Don Juan Triumphant, and demands that it be produced with Christine, who is now secretly engaged to Raoul, in the lead role. He pulls Christine's engagement ring from the chain around her neck before vanishing in a flash of light ("Masquerade/Why So Silent").

Raoul accosts Madame Giry and demands that she reveal what she knows about the Phantom. She explains that the Phantom is a brilliant scholar, magician, architect, inventor, and composer, who was born with a deformed face. Feared and reviled by society, he was exhibited in a cage as part of a travelling fair until he escaped and took refuge beneath the opera house.

Raoul plots to use the première of Don Juan Triumphant to trap the Phantom, knowing he will attend the debut. He begs Christine to help lure the Phantom into the trap ("Notes/Twisted Every Way"). During rehearsals, Piangi, the house tenor, sings his role incorrectly, causing chaos. The piano suddenly plays by itself, with the entire cast singing in harmony. Torn between her love for Raoul and her loyalty to the Phantom, Christine visits her father's grave, begging for his guidance ("Wishing You Were Somehow Here Again"). The Phantom appears atop the mausoleum ("Wandering Child"). Christine begins succumbing to the Phantom's influence, but Raoul arrives to rescue her. The Phantom taunts Raoul, hurling fireballs at him until Christine begs Raoul to leave with her. Furious, the Phantom declares war upon them.

Don Juan Triumphant premieres with Christine and Piangi singing the lead roles of Aminta and Don Juan. During Don Juan and Aminta's duet, Christine realises that the Phantom has replaced Piangi ("Don Juan Triumphant/The Point of No Return"). She calmly removes his mask, revealing his deformed face to the horrified audience. Exposed, the Phantom drags Christine off the stage and back to his lair. Piangi's garrotted body is revealed backstage and the opera house plunges into chaos. An angry mob, vowing vengeance for the murders of Buquet and Piangi, searches for the Phantom. Madame Giry tells Raoul how to find the Phantom's subterranean lair and warns him to keep his hand at the level of his eyes to avoid the magical lasso ("Down Once More/Track Down This Murderer").

The Phantom forces Christine to wear a wedding dress. Raoul comes to the rescue but is ensnared in the Punjab lasso. The Phantom offers Christine an ultimatum: if she will stay with him, he will spare Raoul, but if she refuses, Raoul will die ("Have You Gorged Yourself?"). Christine tells the Phantom that he is not alone and kisses him.

Having experienced kindness and compassion for the first time, the Phantom frees Raoul. He tells Christine that he loves her before she exits the lair with Raoul. As the mob closes in, the Phantom huddles on his throne beneath his cloak. Meg is the first to enter the lair. She approaches the Phantom's throne and pulls away the cloak, finding only his mask ("Finale").

== Development ==
=== Idea ===
In 1984, Lloyd Webber contacted Cameron Mackintosh, the co-producer of Cats and Song and Dance, to propose a new musical. He was aiming for a romantic and tragic piece, and suggested Gaston Leroux's book The Phantom of the Opera as a basis. They screened both the 1925 Lon Chaney and the 1943 Claude Rains motion picture versions, but neither saw any effective way to make the leap from film to stage. Later Lloyd Webber found a second-hand copy of the original novel, which supplied the necessary inspiration to develop a musical: said Lloyd Webber, "I was actually writing something else at the time, and I realised that the reason I was hung up was because I was trying to write a major romantic story, and I had been trying to do that ever since I started my career. Then with the Phantom, it was there!"

=== Lyricists ===
Lloyd Webber first approached Jim Steinman to write the lyrics because of his "dark obsessive side", but he declined in order to fulfill his commitments on a Bonnie Tyler album. Alan Jay Lerner (1918–1986) was then recruited, but he became seriously ill after joining the project and was forced to withdraw; none of his contributions (mostly involving the song "Masquerade") are credited in the show. Richard Stilgoe, the lyricist for Starlight Express, was then hired and wrote most of the original lyrics for the show. However, Charles Hart, a young and then-relatively unknown lyricist, later rewrote many of the lyrics, along with original lyrics for "Think of Me". Some of Stilgoe's original contributions are still present in the final version nevertheless.

=== Score ===
Inspired in part by an earlier musical version of the same story by Ken Hill, Lloyd Webber's score is sometimes operatic in style but maintains the form and structure of a musical throughout. The full-fledged operatic passages are reserved principally for subsidiary characters such as André and Firmin, Carlotta, and Piangi. They are also used to provide the content of the fictional operas that are taking place within the show itself, viz., Hannibal, Il Muto, and the Phantom's masterwork, Don Juan Triumphant. "Here, Lloyd Webber pastiched various styles from the grand operas of Meyerbeer through to Mozart and even Gilbert and Sullivan." These pieces are often presented as musical fragments, interrupted by dialogue or action sequences in order to clearly define the musical's "show within a show" format. The musical extracts from the Phantom's opera, "Don Juan Triumphant", heard during the latter stages of the show, are dissonant and modern—"suggesting, perhaps, that the Phantom is ahead of his time artistically".

In the musical's title song, the signature, chromatic five-note descending eighth-note run from the major root to the flat 6th below is directly similar to a riff created by Pink Floyd for the track "Echoes" on their 1971 album Meddle, something noted with indignation by Pink Floyd's Roger Waters in a 1992 interview.

=== Design, direction, and choreography ===
Maria Björnson designed the sets and over 200 costumes, including the elaborate gowns in the "Masquerade" sequence. Her set designs, including the chandelier, subterranean gondola, and sweeping staircase, earned her multiple awards. Hal Prince, director of Cabaret, Candide, Follies, and Lloyd Webber's Evita, directed the production, while Gillian Lynne, associate director and choreographer of Cats, provided the integral musical staging and choreography.

=== First preview at Sydmonton ===
A preview of the first act was staged at Sydmonton Court (Lloyd Webber's home) in 1985, starring Colm Wilkinson (later the star of the Toronto production) as the Phantom, Sarah Brightman as Kristin (later Christine), and Clive Carter (later a member of the London cast) as Raoul, West End star David Burt was also featured as Monsieur Firmin and Jeff Shankley played opposite him as Monsieur André. This very preliminary production used Richard Stilgoe's original unaltered lyrics, and many songs sported names that were later changed, such as "What Has Time Done to Me" ("Think of Me"), and "Papers" ("Notes"). The Phantom's original mask covered the entire face and remained in place throughout the performance, obscuring the actor's vision and muffling his voice. Maria Björnson designed the now-iconic half-mask to replace it, and the unmasking sequence was added. Clips of this preview performance were included on the DVD of the 2004 film production.

== Productions ==
=== Original West End Production ===
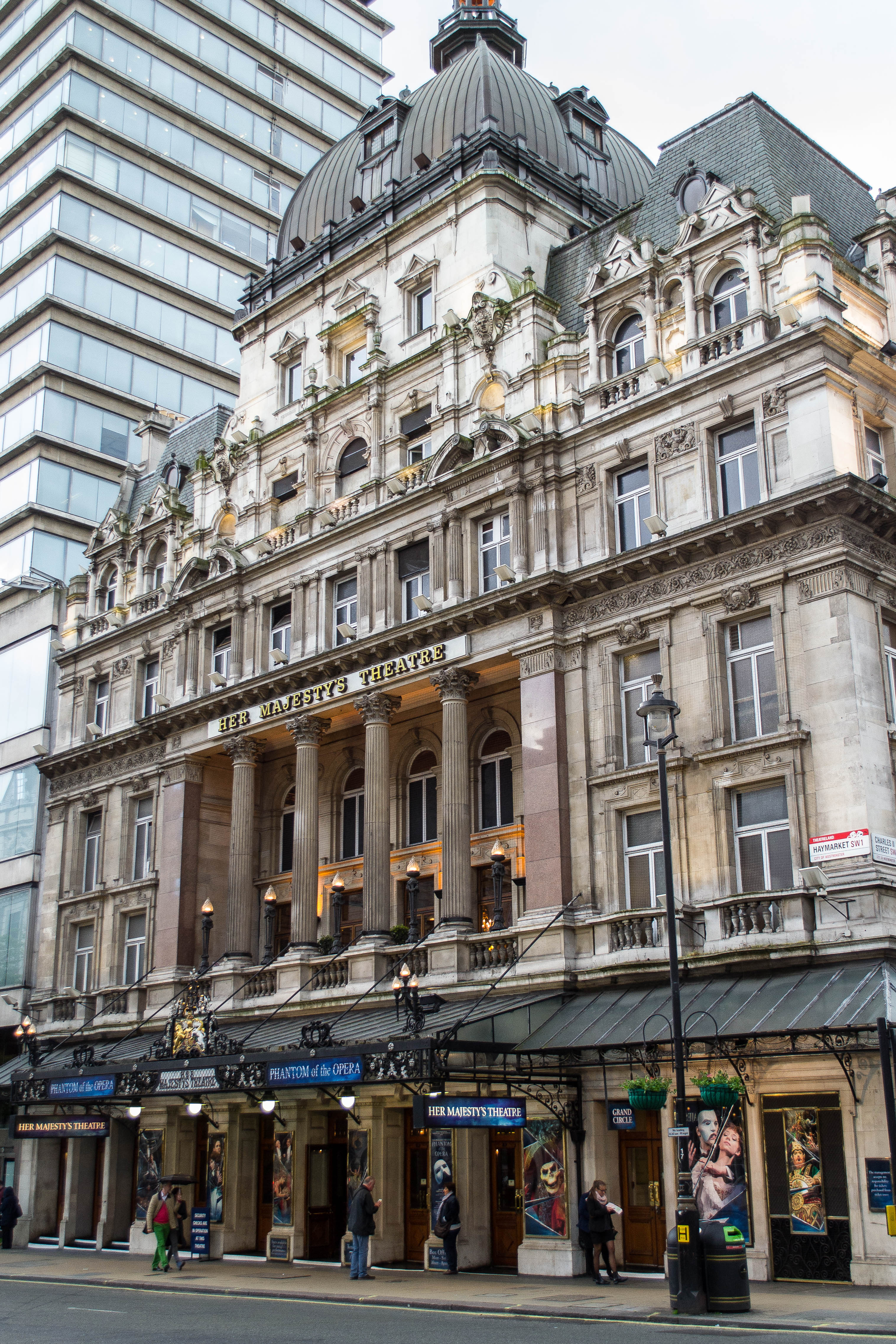
At Her Majesty's Theatre

The Phantom of the Opera began previews at Her Majesty's Theatre in London's West End on 27 September 1986 under the direction of Hal Prince, then opened on 9 October. It was choreographed by Gillian Lynne and the sets were designed by Maria Björnson, with lighting by Andrew Bridge. Michael Crawford starred in the title role with Sarah Brightman as Christine, Steve Barton as Raoul, Rosemary Ashe as Carlotta, David Firth as Monsieur André, John Savident as Monsieur Firmin, Mary Millar as Madame Giry, Janet Devenish as Meg Giry, and John Aron as Piangi. When Crawford, Brightman, and Barton left the cast to open the Broadway production they were replaced by Dave Willetts, Claire Moore, and Michael Ball respectively. The production celebrated its 10,000th performance on 23 October 2010, with Lloyd Webber and the original Phantom, Crawford, in attendance. The 30th anniversary was on 10 October 2016 with a special appearance of the original cast during the curtain call. It is the second longest-running musical in West End history behind Les Misérables, and third overall behind The Mousetrap.

The production suspended performances on 16 March 2020, due to the shutdown of theatres resulting from the COVID-19 pandemic. The following month, it was announced that an "extended closure" would be required to refurbish the sets and the theatre. In July 2020, social media outlets posted photographs of the sets, props, and costumes being loaded out from Her Majesty's Theatre. As Mackintosh had only recently closed the original 1985 London production of Les Misérables in order to replace it with a newer staging that had previously toured the UK, speculation mounted that the original production of The Phantom of the Opera was to be overhauled or replaced entirely. Confirmation of this speculation was given on 28 July 2020, when Mackintosh announced that he and Lloyd Webber had decided to "permanently close" the original London production after a 33-year run, but that the two were "determined" for the musical to return to the West End.

In response to this announcement, the Really Useful Group denied that the original production was permanently closing, stating that the extended closure was simply to enable a refurbishment of the theatre and that the show would return "unchanged" and any returning production would "not be a new version of the show", but without confirming upon request by The Stage as to whether the production's 27-piece orchestra would return. In October 2020, Mackintosh contradicted this clarification by stating that the "new version" based on the 2020 UK tour would in fact be the staging that would reopened at Her Majesty's Theatre post-pandemic.

Mackintosh confirmed in an interview on 4 December 2020 that the original London staging had officially ended, with investors having been given their closing notices, and that the 2020 tour would be moved into the show's original home at Her Majesty's Theatre. Lloyd Webber and Mackintosh announced a planned reopening on 27 July 2021. Planning documentation submitted by LW Theatres confirmed considerable redesigns of Maria Björnson's set, with the removal of the Angel statue, reductions in the mobility of the travelator and candelabra, and fewer grotesques on the proscenium as had featured in the original production. It was additionally confirmed on 12 April 2021 that, contrary to claims by Lloyd Webber that the original production would return "in its entirety", the orchestra of the original production (once the largest for any West End musical) was to be halved for the show's return to the West End using the reduced tour orchestrations. On 15 April 2021, Mackintosh confirmed that the original staging would not be reinstated at Her Majesty's Theatre and that the designs of Maria Björnson, direction of Hal Prince, and choreography of Gillian Lynne would be "reimagined by a new team". The producer reconfirmed in an interview with the Daily Telegraph in April 2021 that the 2020 reduced touring redesigns would replace the originals at Her Majesty's Theatre. Full casting for the new production was announced on 27 April 2021, with all previous longtime cast members having departed the show.

==== 2021 West End reopening ====
Phantom reopened on 27 July 2021 at the same Her Majesty's Theatre. Although Lloyd Webber described the show as "substantially identical" to the original production, the updated staging is "a reduced, cheaper version, with 14 musicians in an orchestra that used to have 27". Alterations were additionally made to the show's set design by Matt Kinley in order to "reduce running costs". This included, among other modifications, the loss of Maria Björnson's sculptures covering the sides of the proscenium (previously described by Harold Prince as the "key to the show") and the levitating Angel statue during the "All I Ask of You" sequence (replaced by a replica of Lequesne's La Renommée retenant Pégase that appears on the stage). Other sequences, including that of the descent to the lair (in which doubles of the Phantom and Christine were excised, previously mobile candelabra became stationary, and the number of candles populating the lake were reduced), were also restaged by Seth Sklar-Heyn. The use of the sweeping red curtain that had concluded each act was replaced by a painted flat, and the mobility of the 'travelator' bridge was reduced. Whereas Prince had envisioned the show as a "black box" production requiring the use of black velour and paint around the proscenium, this was removed as part of the restoration to Her Majesty's Theatre, with once blacked-out stage boxes returned to their original green and red colours and reintroduced for audience use. The orchestra was reduced to 14 players from the original 27. The reopening cast featured Killian Donnelly as the Phantom, Lucy St. Louis as Christine, Rhys Whitfield as Raoul, Saori Oda as Carlotta, and other cast members from the aborted 2020 UK tour.

New casting was announced on 18 January 2023 with Earl Carpenter and Jon Robyns starring as the Phantom respectively from 13 February to 1 April and from 3 April 2023, and Holly-Anne Hull starring as Christine Daae from 23 January. For the show's fortieth anniversary celebrations, a new West End cast was brought in featuring international talents Jordan Donica and Sierra Boggess as the Phantom and Carlotta, and established London performers Beatrice Penny-Touré, Whitfield and Joseph Millson as Christine, Raoul and André, respectively. Donica was also the first principal black actor to play the role in the West End.

Considering one continuous production despite revisions, The Phantom of the Opera celebrated its 16,000th performance in the West End on 31 October 2026.

=== Original Broadway Production ===
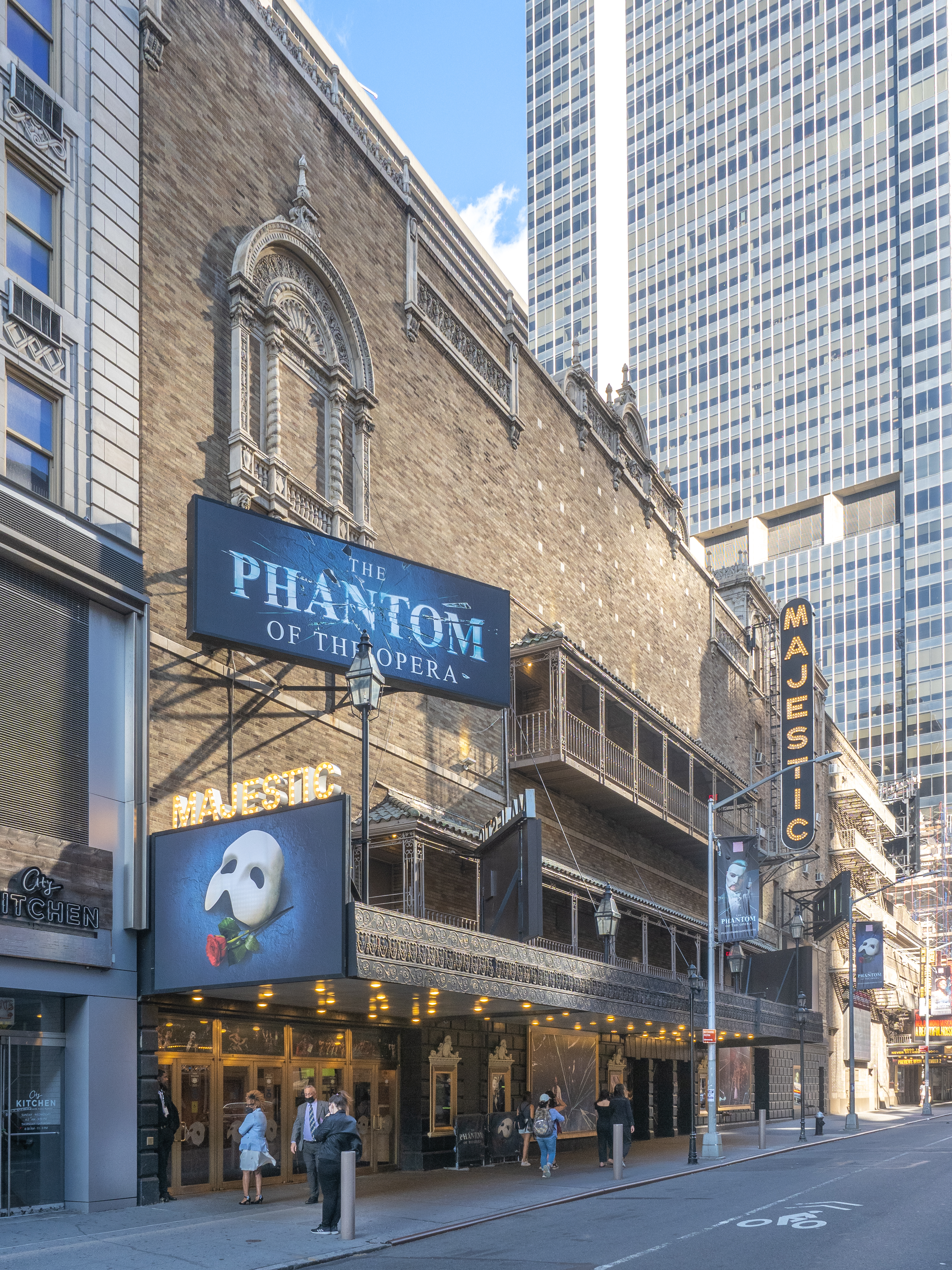
At the Majestic Theatre

The Phantom of the Opera began Broadway previews at the Majestic Theatre on 9 January 1988 and opened on 26 January. Michael Crawford, Sarah Brightman, and Steve Barton reprised their respective roles from the West End. The rest of the original Broadway cast included Judy Kaye as Carlotta, Cris Groenendaal as Monsieur André, Nicholas Wyman as Monsieur Firmin, Elisa Heinsohn as Meg Giry, Leila Martin as Madame Giry, and David Romano as Piangi. When Crawford left the production in October 1988 to appear in the first national tour he was replaced by noted baritone Timothy Nolen. Nolen was replaced by Groenendaal six months later. In March 1990, Barton returned to the production for a nine-month stint as the Phantom. The production continued to play at the Majestic, where it became the first Broadway musical in history to surpass 10,000 performances on 11 February 2012 before ultimately closing on 16 April 2023. On 26 January 2013, the production celebrated its 25th anniversary with its 10,400th performance. It is, by over 3,500 performances, the longest-running show in Broadway history. The 30th anniversary was on 26 January 2018 with special activities and an extra performance during the week. By April 2019, The Phantom of the Opera had been staged over 13,000 times. Howard McGillin and Hugh Panaro are the two longest running principal Phantoms in the production. Norm Lewis was the first African American actor to portray the Phantom on Broadway.

On 12 March 2020, the show suspended production due to the COVID-19 pandemic, and resumed performances on 22 October 2021. Unlike the West End production, the Broadway show returned with the original Harold Prince-directed production and Maria Björnson's original set and costume designs. After Prince's death in 2019, his daughter Daisy, who is also a theater director, began serving as an informal advisor for the production.

The production struggled to return to pre-pandemic attendance levels after its return. In September 2022, it was scheduled to close on 18 February 2023, shortly after its 35th anniversary. After this announcement, attendance surged, and the closing was pushed back to 16 April 2023. The final Broadway cast included Ben Crawford as the Phantom, Emilie Kouatchou as Christine, John Riddle as Raoul, Raquel Suarez Groen as Carlotta, Nehal Joshi as Monsieur André, Craig Bennett as Monsieur Firmin, Maree Johnson as Madame Giry, Carlton Moe as Piangi, and Sara Etsy as Meg Giry. However, during the last two weeks on Broadway, Crawford was out sick. From 2 to 8 April and 13 April, understudy Jeremy Stolle played the Phantom. At four performances from 3 to 15 April, Ted Keegan played the Phantom. Laird Mackintosh played the Phantom during 14 and 15 April evening performances and for the final performance on 16 April, becoming the last person to play the title role in the original Broadway production. By its closing date, the Broadway production had played 13,981 performances (exceeding its London counterpart by 62 performances).

== Reviews ==
Critical reviews of the Broadway production were mostly positive on opening. The New York Times' Frank Rich writes: "It may be possible to have a terrible time at The Phantom of the Opera, but you'll have to work at it. Only a terminal prig would let the avalanche of pre-opening publicity poison his enjoyment of this show, which usually wants nothing more than to shower the audience with fantasy and fun, and which often succeeds, at any price." Howard Kissel from New York Daily News commended the production, calling it "a spectacular entertainment, visually the most impressive of the British musicals", and praised Lloyd Webber's score despite its "synthetic, borrowed quality" as well as Michael Crawford's "powerful" performance. Maria Björnson's set and costume design in particular garnered critical acclaim, with reviewers calling it "a breathtaking, witty, sensual tribute to 19th century theater" as well as "marvels of period atmospheric detail and technical savvy".

== Other productions ==
=== United Kingdom ===
A 25th-anniversary stage performance was held in London on 1 and 2 October 2011 at the Royal Albert Hall and was screened live in cinemas worldwide. The production was produced by Cameron Mackintosh, directed by Laurence Connor, musical staging & choreography by Gillian Lynne, set design by Matt Kinley, costume design by Maria Björnson, lighting design by Patrick Woodroffe, and sound design by Mick Potter. The cast included Ramin Karimloo as the Phantom, Sierra Boggess as Christine, Hadley Fraser as Raoul, Wynne Evans as Piangi, Wendy Ferguson as Carlotta, Barry James as Monsieur Firmin, Gareth Snook as Monsieur Andre, Liz Robertson as Madame Giry, and Daisy Maywood as Meg Giry. Former West End Phantom Earl Carpenter played the Auctioneer. Lloyd Webber and several original cast members, including Crawford and Brightman, were in attendance, as well as Colm Wilkinson and Anthony Warlow who originated the role of the Phantom in Canada and Australia respectively. A DVD and Blu-ray of the performance was released in February 2012, and it began airing in March 2012 on PBS's "Great Performances" television series.

In March 2012, a new production directed by Laurence Connor began a UK and Ireland tour to commemorate the 25th anniversary of the show, beginning at the Theatre Royal Plymouth and travelled to Manchester, Bristol, Dublin, Leeds, Edinburgh, Milton Keynes, Cardiff, and Southampton. John Owen-Jones and Earl Carpenter alternated as the Phantom, with Katie Hall as Christine and Simon Bailey as Raoul. In November 2019, the co-producers of The Phantom of the Opera, Mackintosh and Lloyd Webber's Really Useful Group (RUG), announced that the show would again tour the UK and Ireland, but this time with a return to the original production rather than the 2012 production. Although this announcement stated that the tour would be an "exact replica" of the musical on Broadway and in the West End, alterations were made to the set design in order to make the tour "lighter". These included a scaling down of the production's false proscenium, with the centrepiece Angel statue designed by Maria Björnson removed. Performances of this latest 2020 tour were suspended from 16 March 2020 as a result of the COVID-19 pandemic. In May 2020, Mackintosh and RUG announced the premature closure of the tour as a result. Rather than resume the tour following the end of COVID-19-related shutdowns, the producers installed that production into Her Majesty's Theatre in London in July 2021, where it replaced Hal Prince's original production.

=== Other international productions ===
The Phantom of the Opera has been translated into several languages and produced in over 40 countries on 6 continents. With some exceptions like the 25th Anniversary UK and US Tours, these productions have all been "clones", using the original staging, direction, sets, and costume concepts. Notable international productions include the following:

- Argentina: The show ran from March to November 2009 in Buenos Aires at the Teatro Opera.
- Australia: 1990–1998: Melbourne, Sydney, Brisbane, Adelaide, and Perth; 2007–2009: Melbourne, Brisbane, Sydney, Auckland, Perth and Adelaide, both starring Anthony Warlow as the Phantom. Brian Stacey was the original conductor of the first Australian production. Marina Prior starred as Christine in the original production, where Rob Guest later took over the title role. The final leg of the recent tour was staged in Adelaide in an arena format featuring giant screens on either side of the stage that presented footage shot simultaneously with the performance. 2013: Canberra starring Michael Cormick as The Phantom and with Julie Lea Goodwin starring as Christine from 9 to 23 August 2013. Goodwin had previously played the role, as the "Alternate Christine", in the 2007 to 2009 national tour. An outdoor production at the Sydney Harbour with all new sets, costumes and direction ran from March to April 2022. A production ran from August 2022 to February 2023 at the Sydney Opera House with Josh Piterman, Amy Manford and Paul Ettore Tabone reprising their roles of the Phantom, Christine and Piangi from the West End production.
- Austria: The German-language premiere was the second overall after the original London show. It opened at the Theater an der Wien in December 1988, running until June 1993. A production of the touring version by Laurence Connor is scheduled to premiere in Vienna in March 2024, produced by Vereinigte Bühnen Wien at the Raimund Theater.
- Brazil: The first Brazilian production premiered in São Paulo in April 2005 and closed in April 2007. The revival began 1 August 2018 in São Paulo at the Teatro Renault.
- Canada: The Canadian production of The Phantom of the Opera ran from 20 September 1989 to 31 October 1999 in Toronto at the Pantages Theatre, with Colm Wilkinson originating the role of the Phantom. The Canadian International Touring Company toured the musical in Canada, Hawaii, Alaska, Hong Kong, and Singapore from 11 March 1991 to October 1995. The Music Box Tour (third US national tour) played dates across Canada in 2006–2007 including Calgary, Vancouver, Edmonton, Winnipeg, Toronto, Saskatoon and Ottawa.
- China: The Shanghai production played 97 performances at the Shanghai Grand Theatre. The world tour had their sixth season at the Culture Plaza Theatre at Shanghai Culture Square from 3 December 2013 to 26 January 2014. The world tour returned to China at the Guangzhou Opera House in Guangzhou from 26 September to 10 October 2015 and performed its final season at the Tianqiao Performing Arts Center in Beijing from 17 November 2015 to 10 January 2016. A new mandarin production opened in Shanghai from 2 May to 4 June 2023. It was then announced that it would tour the mainland China, visiting Shenzhen, Quanzhou, Guangzhou, Xiamen, Nanjing, Hangzhou, Beijing, Changsha, Chengdu, etc.
- Czech Republic: The GoJA Music Hall Theater in Prague had a non-replica production, beginning September 2014. The revival began in September 2018 and a planned finish in June 2019.
- Denmark: First production was in Copenhagen in 2000 and the second ran from January to May 2009. The third began in September 2018, also in Copenhagen.
- Estonia: Production in Estonian (but with English and Finnish subtitles) featuring original sets, costumes, and direction premiered on 4 October 2014 at Theatre Vanemuine in Tartu. In first season 2014/2015 there were 24 performances in total, eight of which took place in capital Tallinn at Nordea Concert Hall (premiered there on 30 October 2014). In spring 2017 there will be further 12 performances (two of which in Tallinn).
- Finland: A Finnish production premiered in Helsinki in 2015 at the Finnish National Opera in English. The revival began in November 2018. A second revival began in October 2021.
- Germany: Das Phantom der Oper played at the musical theatre Neue Flora (later renamed to Stage Theater Neue Flora) in Hamburg from 29 June 1990 to 30 June 2001, the Palladium Theatre in Stuttgart from 1 November 2002 to 23 May 2004, and at the Colosseum Theater in Essen from 2005 to 2007. A Hamburg revival production ran in reduced staging and orchestration from 28 November 2013 to 30 September 2015 at the Theater Neue Flora and was later transferred to the Metronom Theater in Oberhausen where it was performed from 17 November 2015 to 4 September 2016.
- Hungary: Madách Theatre, Budapest. This production, which began in 2003, was the first to modify the original staging with new sets, costumes and direction. The five hundredth performance on 20 September 2007 featured four successive sets of casts.
- Italy: The show will open for the first time in Italy at the Politeama Rossetti in Trieste on 4 July 2023, starring Ramin Karimloo as the Phantom, Bradley Jaden as Raoul, and Earl Carpenter as Monsieur André. This non-replica production will be presented in English and also visit the Tam Teatro Arcimboldi Milano in October 2023 and the Opéra de Monte-Carlo in December 2023.
- Japan: A Japanese production opened in Tokyo in 1988, and has since played in other Japanese cities.
- Mexico: The show had its Mexican premiere on 16 December 1999, in Spanish in Mexico City.
- Netherlands: A production in Scheveningen began in August 1993 and closed in August 1996 with Henk Poort as the title role.
- New Zealand: Opened at the Aotea Centre in Auckland in 1997 and at The Civic, The Edge-Auckland in 2008. A local production (with new designs) opened on 13 June at the St. James Theatre in Wellington and closed on 16 July 2013.
- Norway: A non-replica production opened for the first time in Oslo in September 2018.
- Panama: For the first time in Central America, El Fantasma de la Opera played in Spanish at the Teatro Anayansi of the Atlapa Convention Center from 23 to 25 September 2016, directed by Aaron Zebede. Randy Dominguez starred in the role of The Phantom, with Maria Fernanda Achurra as Christine and Leo Almengor as Raoul.
- Poland: The Polish production opened at the Roma Theater in Warsaw in March 2008 and closed in June 2010.
- Romania: The Romanian premiere was in January 2015 produced by the Romanian National Opereta. This new non-replica production was performed in Romanian with a local cast led by a British creative team.
- Russia: Moscow production co-produced by Stage Entertainment and Really Useful Group premiered on 4 October 2014 in the MDM theatre starring Ivan Ozhogin and Dmitry Yermak as The Phantom. The stalls and the stage were modernised specially for the production. The premiere was attended by Richard Stilgoe and Charles Hart.
- Serbia: The Serbian premiere was in October 2017 produced by Belgrade-based Terazije Theatre. The non-replica production was performed in Serbian with a local cast.
- Singapore: First tour at the Kallang Theatre from 26 February 1995 to 20 May 1995, second tour at the Esplanade – Theatres on the Bay from 23 March 2007 to 20 May 2007.
- South Korea: Three productions in Korean; The first in December 2001, the second in 2009 and the third from 2023 to 2024. The world tour had two shows in Seoul in 2005, December 2012, and 2020. The show in 2020 was the only production held at that time due to COVID-19.
- Spain: A Spanish production ran at the Teatro Lope de Vega in Madrid from 4 September 2002 to 30 June 2004. A second production, this time non-replica, ran at the Teatro Albéniz in Madrid from 4 October 2023 to 20 April 2025, before embarking on a national tour.
- Sweden: First production premiered in Stockholm 1989 and the second one in September 2016
- Switzerland: Opened and co-produced by the Really Useful Group on 12 October 1995 at the Musical Theater Basel, the play was performed until 27 July 1997. Two performances per week were given in the original English while the other performances were given in the German translation from Hamburg.
- Turkey: The world tour played in Istanbul at the Zorlu Center PSM from 7 April to 17 May 2015.
- Thailand: World tour production opened in Bangkok on 7 May 2013 and closed on 9 June 2013 at Muangthai Rachadalai Theatre. The second world tour, produced by Tero Scenario, Really Useful Group, and Crossroads Live began on 5 August 2025 to 31 August 2025 at the same venue.
- United States: Los Angeles (1989–1993), San Francisco (1993–1999). A US national tour commenced in 1992 in Seattle and closed on 31 October 2010 at the Pantages Theatre in Hollywood, California, after nearly two decades. The closing night performance was attended by many former cast and crew members, including Andrew Lloyd Webber and Sarah Brightman. A multi-year North American tour is set to begin on 7 November 2025 at the Hippodrome in Baltimore.
- World tour: The Phantom of the Opera embarked on a world tour in February 2019, featuring Jonathan Roxmouth as the Phantom, Meghan Picerno as Christine, and Matt Leisy as Raoul. The first leg of the tour began in Manila at the Theatre at Solaire on 20 February 2019 and closed its Manila leg on 6 April 2019. The cast was also set to perform in Singapore, Kuala Lumpur, Tel Aviv, and Dubai for the succeeding legs of the tour in 2019. In 2020, performances were set in Taiwan and later continued to South Korea. In 2021, a documentary called Show Must Go On came out, documenting how the world tour Phantom of the Opera production dealt with the COVID pandemic and went on stage in South Korea when restrictions were lifted, and Andrew Lloyd Webber's struggle to reopen theatres in the UK.

=== Phantom: The Las Vegas Spectacular ===
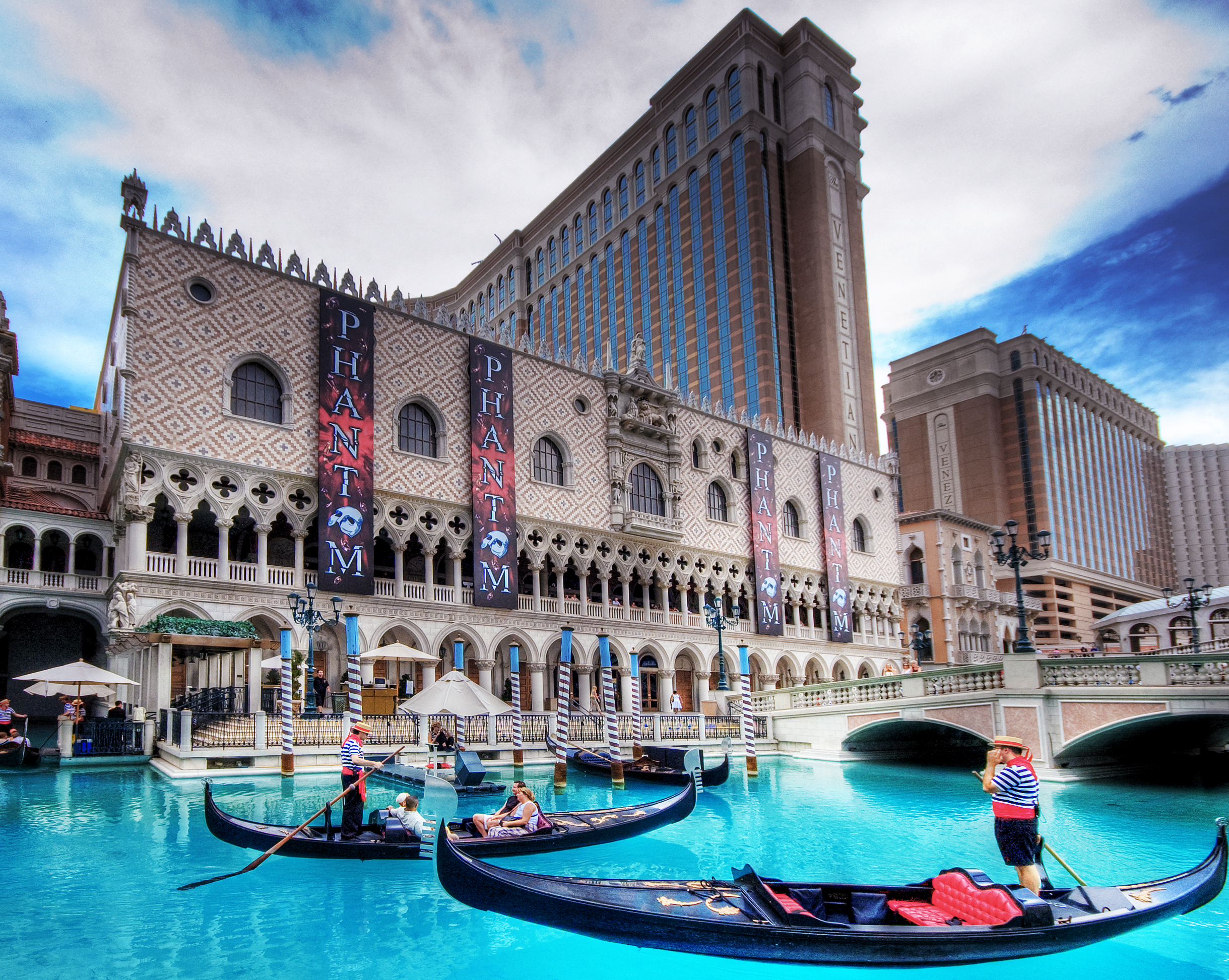
At The Venetian Las Vegas

An edited production renamed Phantom: The Las Vegas Spectacular opened 24 June 2006 at The Venetian Las Vegas. The show starred Brent Barrett and Anthony Crivello as the Phantom, Sierra Boggess and Elizabeth Loyacano as Christine, and Tim Martin Gleason as Raoul. The theatre was built specifically for the show to resemble the Opéra Garnier in Paris. The production ran 95 minutes with no intermission, and was directed and choreographed by Harold Prince and Gillian Lynne, with scenic designs by David Rockwell. The show featured updated technology and effects, including a re-engineered chandelier capable of reassembling in midair during the overture while the entire interior of the venue (not merely the stage) returned to its 1880s halcyon days. Almost 45 minutes' worth of material was eliminated, such as the Don Juan Triumphant rehearsal. "Poor Fool, He Makes Me Laugh" while "The Point of No Return" were significantly shortened. Other changes resembled those in the 2004 film, such as staging the chandelier crash at the plot's climax (during performance of "The Point of No Return") rather than mid-story. Due to economic reasons, the Las Vegas production closed on 2 September 2012, after five years and almost 2,700 performances.

=== Copyright release ===
In 2011, the Really Useful Group (copyright owners of The Phantom of the Opera) released certain rights to the musical in celebration of its 25th anniversary. In March 2011 Reed-Custer High School in Braidwood, Illinois, became the first school to perform The Phantom of the Opera under the new rights. Later in 2011, Stanwell School in Penarth became the first school in the UK to perform the show.

=== Cancelled French production ===
A production was originally planned for the first ever French production in Paris at the Mogador Theatre in September 2016. Sierra Boggess was set to reprise her performance as Christine and Garðar Thór Cortes was cast as The Phantom. A few days before the premiere, a fire damaged the stage floor and most of the backdrops and set pieces leading to the cancellation of the production.

=== Masquerade ===
Immediately following the closure of the Broadway production, Andrew Lloyd Webber appeared on the Tonight Show and hinted a likely revival of Phantom in the near future at a different theater. Industry insiders widely speculated these comments to indicate a Broadway transfer of the revised London production. While Mackintosh and Really Useful did eventually announce a new North American tour based on this production, no announcement was made of a transfer to Broadway. However, in 2024, a casting notice was issued by "POTO, LLC" for an "untitled immersive musical production" that was widely rumoured to be a remount of Phantom. After extensive speculation, the completely new production Masquerade was announced in mid-2025, performing off-Broadway at 218 West 57th Street, custom renovated for the show, where guests traverse through a multistory experience presented in an intimate immersive format.. The show, directed by Diane Paulus and produced by Randy Weiner, opened on September 29th, 2025. Masquerade's cast includes at least three former Phantoms in Hugh Panaro, Jeremy Stolle, and Cooper Grodin, as well as two former Christines in Eryn LeCroy and Kaley Ann Voorhees, and one former Raoul in Paul Adam Schaefer. Other notable performers in the cast include Nik Walker, Kyle Scatliffe, Telly Leung, Jeff Kready, and Quentin Earl Darrington. The production was nominated for a Drama League Award and an Outer Critics Circle Award for Outstanding Revival of a Musical.. Masquerade also won a 2026 Drama Desk Special Award for Outstanding Creative Collaboration.

== Film adaptations ==
=== 2004 film ===
A film adaptation, directed by Joel Schumacher and starring Gerard Butler as the Phantom, Emmy Rossum as Christine, Patrick Wilson as Raoul, Minnie Driver as Carlotta, and Miranda Richardson as Madame Giry, was released on 22 December 2004 in the US.

=== Anime film ===
In August 2025, it was announced that Qubic Pictures and Lloyd Webber's LW Entertainment will adapt the musical into an anime, with Justin Leach overseeing the project.

=== Possible new film adaptation ===
In June 2025, Lloyd Webber revealed that a remake of the 2004 film is in the early stages of development. While not revealing potential directors or actors, he suggested that he'd like to see "somebody who is in their early 40s" play the Phantom in the new film.

== Casting ==
=== Original casts ===
The original casts of the English-speaking productions of The Phantom of the Opera:

Character	West End	Broadway	US tour	Canada	Australia	UK tour	Las Vegas	Royal Albert Hall 25th anniversary	25th anniversary UK tour	US Tour
Character	1986	1988	1989		1990	1993	2006	2011	2012	2025
The Phantom of the Opera	Michael Crawford	Michael Crawford	Michael Crawford	Colm Wilkinson	Anthony Warlow	Dave Willetts	Anthony Crivello Brent Barrett (Note: Three roles (The Phantom, Christine, and Carlotta) were double-cast in the original Las Vegas production, with the two actors in each pair singing alternate performances. Later, Las Vegas casting became identical to that in the Broadway production, with single casting for all characters and the principal/alternate structure for Christine.)	Ramin Karimloo	John Owen-Jones Earl Carpenter	Isaiah Bailey
Christine Daaé	Sarah Brightman	Sarah Brightman	Dale Kristien	Rebecca Caine	Marina Prior	Lisa Hull	Sierra Boggess	Sierra Boggess	Katie Hall	Jordan Lee Gilbert
Raoul, Vicomte de Chagny	Steve Barton	Steve Barton	Steve Barton	Byron Nease	Dale Burridge	Mike Sterling	Tim Martin Gleason	Hadley Fraser	Simon Bailey	Daniel Lopez
Monsieur Gilles André	David Firth	Cris Groenendaal	Norman Large	Paul Massel	John O'May	Simon Green	John Leslie Wolfe	Gareth Snook	Simon Green	Carrington Vilmont
Monsieur Richard Firmin	John Savident	Nicholas Wyman	Calvin Remsberg	Gregory Cross	Jon Ewing	Alan Rice	Lawson Skala	Barry James	Andy Hockley	William Thomas Evans
Carlotta Guidicelli	Rosemary Ashe	Judy Kaye	Leigh Munro	Lyse Guerin	Christa Leahmann	Valda Aviks	Elena Jeanne Batman Geena Jeffries	Wendy Ferguson	Angela M. Caesar	Midori Marsh
Madame Giry	Mary Millar	Leila Martin	Barbara Lang	Kristina-Marie Guiguet	Geraldene Morrow	Veronica Page	Rebecca Spencer	Liz Robertson	Elizabeth Marsh	Lisa Vroman
Meg Giry	Janet Devenish	Elisa Heinsohn	Elisabeth Stringer	Donna Rubin	Sharon Millerchip	Lucy Potter	Brianne Kelly Morgan	Daisy Maywood	Hannah Cadec	Melo Ludwig
Ubaldo Piangi	John Aron	David Romano	Gualtiero Negrini	Peter Cormican	Christopher Dawes	Geoffrey Pogson	Larry Wayne Morbitt	Wynne Evans	Vincent Pirillo	Christopher Bozeka

=== Notable replacements ===
==== West End (1986–present) ====
- Christine Daaé: Rachel Barrell, Gina Beck, Meredith Braun, Rebecca Caine, Sofia Escobar, Celia Graham, Leila Benn Harris, Katie Hall, Holly-Anne Hull, Myrra Malmberg, Chumisa Dornford-May, Claire Moore, Robyn North, Anna O'Byrne, Celinde Schoenmaker, Lucy St. Louis, Anna Zavelson
- The Phantom: Simon Bowman, Earl Carpenter, Peter Cousens, Jordan Donica, Killian Donnelly, Ben Forster, Ethan Freeman, Tim Howar, Peter Jöback, Ramin Karimloo, Peter Karrie, Glyn Kerslake, Ben Lewis, Marcus Lovett, John Owen-Jones, Peter Polycarpou, Gerónimo Rauch, Jon Robyns, Martin Smith, David Thaxton, Dave Willetts
- Raoul de Chagny: Michael Ball, John Barrowman, Simon Bowman, Simon Burke, Clive Carter, Michael Cormick, Garðar Thór Cortes, Killian Donnelly, Ramin Karimloo, Sean Palmer, Alex Rathgeber, Oliver Thornton, Michael Xavier
- Carlotta: Joanna Ampil, Sierra Boggess, Rebecca Lock
- André: Martin Ball, Ethan Freeman, Peter Land, Joseph Millson, Mark Wynter
- Firmin: Martin Ball, Michael N. Harbour, Bill Homewood, Barry James, Royce Mills, Bruce Montague
- Madame Giry: Joanna Riding, Liz Robertson, Heather Jackson
- Piangi: Jeremy Secomb, Paul Ettore Tabone

==== Broadway (1988–2023) ====
- Christine Daaé: Sierra Boggess, Kimilee Bryant, Patti Cohenour, Ali Ewoldt, Samantha Hill, Rebecca Luker, Mary Michael Patterson, Meghan Picerno, Julia Udine, Lisa Vroman
- The Phantom: James Barbour, Steve Barton, Ben Crawford, John Cudia, Davis Gaines, Kevin Gray, Cris Groenendaal, Mark Jacoby, Peter Jöback, Ted Keegan, Jeff Keller, Norm Lewis, Brad Little, Marcus Lovett, Laird Mackintosh (Final Phantom), Gary Mauer, Howard McGillin, Timothy Nolen, Thomas James O'Leary, Hugh Panaro
- Raoul de Chagny: John Cudia, Jordan Donica, Jason Forbach, Davis Gaines, Tim Martin Gleason, Kevin Gray, Jay Armstrong Johnson, Brad Little, Gary Mauer, Hugh Panaro, Ciarán Sheehan
- Carlotta: Kimilee Bryant
- André: George Lee Andrews, Bradley Dean, Ted Keegan, Jeff Keller, Laird Mackintosh
- Firmin: George Lee Andrews, David Cryer, Tim Jerome, Jeff Keller
- Madame Giry: Linda Balgord
- Piangi: Peter Lockyer

==== First, second, and third US national tours (1989–1999, 1990–1998, and 1992–2010) ====
- Christine Daaé: Lisa Vroman, Susan Owen, Kimilee Bryant
- The Phantom: Davis Gaines, Robert Guillaume, Ron Bohmer, Kevin Gray, Mark Jacoby, John Cudia, Tim Martin Gleason, Ted Keegan, Brad Little, Gary Mauer, Thomas James O'Leary
- Raoul de Chagny: John Cudia, Tim Martin Gleason, Ciarán Sheehan
- Meg Giry: Jen Gould

==== Canada (1989–1999) ====
- Christine Daaé: Patti Cohenour
- The Phantom: Ethan Freeman, Cris Groenendaal, Jeff Hyslop, Peter Karrie, Ciarán Sheehan, René Simard, Paul Stanley
- Raoul de Chagny: Laird Mackintosh, Christopher Shyer
- Carlotta: Patricia Phillips
- Meg Giry: Diana Kaarina

==== Australia tours (1990–1998, 2007–2009) ====
- Christine Daaé: Anna O'Byrne
- The Phantom: Anthony Warlow, Rob Guest
- Raoul de Chagny: Alexander Lewis
- Firmin: John O'May

== Musical numbers ==
- "Prologue" (Note: Lyrics by Charles Hart) – Auctioneer, Raoul, Madame Giry
- "Overture" – Orchestra

=== Act I ===
- "Hannibal Rehearsal" – Carlotta, Piangi, Reyer, Lefevre, André, Firmin, Madame Giry, Meg, Buquet, Ensemble
- "Think of Me" (Note: Lyrics by Charles Hart with additional lyrics by Richard Stilgoe) – Christine, Raoul
- "Angel of Music" – The Phantom, Meg, Christine
- "Little Lotte" – Raoul, Christine
- "The Mirror (Angel of Music (Reprise))" – The Phantom, Christine, Raoul
- "The Phantom of the Opera" (Note: Additional lyrics by Mike Batt) – Christine, The Phantom
- "I Have Brought You" – The Phantom
- "The Music of the Night" – The Phantom
- "I Remember" – Christine
- "Stranger Than You Dreamt It" – The Phantom
- "Magical Lasso…" – Buquet, Madame Giry, Meg
- "Notes…" – Firmin, André, Raoul, Carlotta, Piangi, Madame Giry, Meg, The Phantom
- "Prima Donna" – André, Firmin, Carlotta, Piangi, Raoul, Madame Giry, Meg, The Phantom
- "Il Muto" / "Poor Fool, He Makes Me Laugh" – Carlotta, Piangi, The Phantom, Ensemble
- "Why Have You Brought Me Here…?" / "Raoul, I've Been There…" – Raoul, Christine, The Phantom
- "All I Ask of You" – Raoul, Christine
- "All I Ask of You (Reprise)" – The Phantom

=== Act II ===
- "Entr'acte" – Orchestra
- "Masquerade" – André, Firmin, Raoul, Christine, Madame Giry, Meg, Carlotta, Piangi, Ensemble
- "Why So Silent…?" – The Phantom
- "Notes (Reprise)" – André, Firmin, Carlotta, Piangi, Raoul, Christine, Madame Giry, The Phantom
- "Twisted Every Way" – Christine, Raoul
- "Don Juan Triumphant Rehearsal" – Christine, Piangi, Reyer, Carlotta, Madame Giry, Ensemble
- "Wishing You Were Somehow Here Again" – Christine
- "Wandering Child" – The Phantom, Christine, Raoul
- "Bravo, Monsieur…" – The Phantom, Raoul, Christine
- "Don Juan Triumphant" – Carlotta, Piangi, Passarino, Christine, The Phantom, Ensemble
- "The Point of No Return" – The Phantom, Christine
- "Down Once More…" – The Phantom
- "Track Down This Murderer…" – Madame Giry, Raoul, Ensemble
- "Have You Gorged Yourself?" – Christine, The Phantom, Raoul, Ensemble

== Orchestra ==
The original orchestrations were written by David Cullen and Lloyd Webber.

There are several orchestrations:

- 27-piece (the original score, used on Broadway and until 2020 in London, also used for the 2022 Australian production and the 2024 Vienna production)
- 29-piece (the original Broadway score)
- 14-piece (used on tour, most international productions from 2012 onwards, the 2020 UK Tour and in London from 2021)
- 45-piece (used for the 25th anniversary)

The Broadway production originally used a 29-piece pit orchestra:

- Reed I: flute/piccolo
- Reed II: flute/clarinet
- Reed III: oboe/English horn
- Reed IV: B♭ clarinet/bass clarinet/E♭ clarinet
- Reed V: bassoon
- French horns I–III
- Trumpets I–II
- Trombone
- Percussion I-II (see below)
- Keyboards I–II: piano, synthesizer
- Violins I-VIII (currently only six violins)
- Violas I–II
- Cellos I–II
- String bass
- Harp

Percussion is split between two books – regular percussion and mallets:

- 2 timpani, suspended cymbals, crash cymbals, snare drum, triangle, tambourine, bass drum
- Glockenspiel, xylophone, vibes, marimba, tubular bells, bell tree, woodblock, gong, guiro, finger cymbals

The original London score is as the Broadway score but with 1 percussion part and 7 violins. The most recent Broadway orchestration is licensed by R&H Theatricals for amateur and professional productions. The only difference between the Broadway 29- and 27-piece orchestras is the smaller orchestra's lack of Violins VII & VIII.

The current 14-piece orchestration, used in London and on tour, eliminates approximately half of the original orchestra's parts while adding an extra keyboard. Cut books include the original Reed III, harp, percussion, all the brass except one French horn, and most of the string doubles, leaving three violins and one of each other string instrument.

== Recordings ==
Cast recordings have been made of the London, Austrian, Dutch, German, Japanese, Swedish, Korean, Hungarian, Mexican, Polish, Russian and Canadian productions.

The recording of the 1986 original London cast, released by Polydor Records in 1987, was released in both a single-CD Highlights from The Phantom of the Opera and a two-CD Phantom of the Opera, both of which have been certified 4× Platinum in the US and sold 4.97 million copies as of January 2017. The Phantom of the Opera was also certified 3× Platinum in the UK. A newly remixed and expanded version of the 1986 original London cast recording was released on October 9, 2026, coinciding with the show's 40th-anniversary gala at His Majesty's Theatre, London.

The Canadian cast recording went 2× Platinum in Canada. In Switzerland, The Phantom of the Opera was certified 3× Platinum and Highlights was certified 2× Platinum. Recordings of the Vienna cast and the Hamburg cast produced by Jimmy Bowien were certified Gold and triple Platinum, respectively, in Germany. The original album recording has sold an alleged 40 million copies worldwide.

A live recording of The Phantom of the Opera at the Royal Albert Hall was released in the UK on 15 November 2011 and subsequently in the US and Canada on 7 February 2012, along with Blu-ray and DVD videos, and a collectors' box set of the Royal Albert concert, the original cast recording, and the sequel, Love Never Dies.

In October 2026, it was announced that the London production was filmed for release with the 40th anniversary cast, featuring Jordan Donica as the Phantom, Beatrice Penny-Touré as Christine, Rhys Whitfield as Raoul, as well as Sierra Boggess as Carlotta, Matt Bateman as Piangi, Joseph Millson as Monsieur André, Ian Pirie as Monsieur Firmin, Joanna Riding as Madame Giry and Millie Lyon as Meg, set to be released in cinemas in 2027.

=== Sales and certifications ===
==== Original 1986 London production ====
Chart (1987+)	Peak position
Australia (Kent Music Report)	2

Region	Certification	Certified units/sales
Australia (ARIA)	5× Platinum	350,000^{^}
Canada (Music Canada)	2× Platinum	200,000^{^}
New Zealand (RMNZ)	12× Platinum	180,000^{^}
Netherlands (NVPI)	Platinum	100,000^{^}
Poland (ZPAV)	Gold	20,000^{*}
Sweden (GLF)	Gold	50,000^{^}
United Kingdom (BPI)	3× Platinum	900,000^{^}
United States (RIAA)	4× Platinum	4,000,000^{^}
^{*} Sales figures based on certification alone.^{^} Shipments figures based on certification alone.

==== Local productions ====
Region	Certification	Certified units/sales
Austria (IFPI Austria)	Platinum	50,000^{*}
Canada (Music Canada)	8× Platinum	800,000^{^}
Germany (BVMI)	3× Platinum	1,500,000^{^}
Germany (BVMI)	Gold	250,000^{^}
Sweden (GLF)	Gold	50,000^{^}
Switzerland (IFPI Switzerland)	3× Platinum	150,000^{^}
^{*} Sales figures based on certification alone.^{^} Shipments figures based on certification alone.

==== Highlights from The Phantom of the Opera ====
Region	Certification	Certified units/sales
Canada (Music Canada)	8× Platinum	800,000^{^}
Switzerland (IFPI Switzerland)	2× Platinum	100,000^{^}
United States (RIAA)	4× Platinum	4,000,000^{^}
^{*} Sales figures based on certification alone.^{^} Shipments figures based on certification alone.

== Allegations of plagiarism ==
In 1987, the heirs of Giacomo Puccini charged in a lawsuit that a recurring two-bar passage in "Music of the Night" closely resembled a similar phrase first heard in the aria "Quello che tacete" from Puccini's opera La fanciulla del West. The litigation was settled out of court for an undisclosed amount.

In 1990, a Baltimore songwriter named Ray Repp filed a lawsuit alleging that the title song from The Phantom of the Opera was based on a song that he wrote in 1978 called "Till You". After eight years of litigation – including an unsuccessful countersuit by Lloyd Webber claiming that "Till You" was itself a plagiarism of "Close Every Door" from Joseph and the Amazing Technicolor Dreamcoat – the jury found in Lloyd Webber's favour.

Former Pink Floyd vocalist and bassist Roger Waters has claimed that the signature descending/ascending half-tone chord progression from Phantom's title song was plagiarised from the bass line of a track on the 1971 Pink Floyd album Meddle called "Echoes". He avoided taking legal action, saying, "Life's too long to bother with suing Andrew fucking Lloyd Webber."

== Sequel ==
The sequel to The Phantom of the Opera, written by Lloyd Webber, Ben Elton, Frederick Forsyth and Glenn Slater, is called Love Never Dies. It was loosely adapted from the 1999 novel The Phantom of Manhattan, by Forsyth. Set in 1907 (a decade after the conclusion of The Phantom of the Opera according to the production's announcement, but actually 26 years later, as the original show was set in 1881), Christine is invited to perform at Phantasma, a new attraction at Coney Island, by an anonymous impresario. With her husband Raoul and son Gustave in tow, she journeys to Brooklyn, unaware that it is the Phantom who has arranged her appearance at the popular beach resort.

The original production was directed by Jack O'Brien and choreographed by Jerry Mitchell with set and costume designs by Bob Crowley, and opened at the Adelphi Theatre in the West End starring Ramin Karimloo and Sierra Boggess on 9 March 2010. The production received "poor" and "mostly negative" reviews. A scheduled Broadway opening in November 2010 was postponed until Spring 2011 and later cancelled altogether. A revamped Australian production, starring Ben Lewis and Anna O'Byrne, opened 21 May 2011 at the Regent Theatre in Melbourne to more favourable notices. After the Melbourne run ended on 12 December 2011 the production moved to the Capitol Theatre in Sydney where it played from January to April 2012. A West End revival concert starring Norm Lewis and Celinde Schoenmaker at Theatre Royal Drury Lane ran 21 and 22 August 2023. The same concert production is set to return to the West End from October 16 to 18, 2026, at the London Palladium. Schoenmaker is set to reprise her role as Christine opposite Jamie Muscato as The Phantom.

== Awards and nominations ==
=== Original London production ===
Year	Award Ceremony	Category	Nominee	Result
1986	Evening Standard Theatre Award	Best Musical		Won
1986	Laurence Olivier Award	Best New Musical		Won
1986	Laurence Olivier Award	Best Actor in a Musical	Michael Crawford	Won
1986	Laurence Olivier Award	Designer of the Year	Maria Björnson	Nominated
2002	Laurence Olivier Award	Most Popular Show		Won
2016	Laurence Olivier Award	Magic Radio Audience Award		Won

=== Original Broadway production ===
Year	Award Ceremony	Category	Nominee	Result
1988	Tony Award	Best Musical		Won
1988	Tony Award	Best Actor in a Musical	Michael Crawford	Won
1988	Tony Award	Best Featured Actress in a Musical	Judy Kaye	Won
1988	Tony Award	Best Direction of a Musical	Harold Prince	Won
1988	Tony Award	Best Book of a Musical	Richard Stilgoe and Andrew Lloyd Webber	Nominated
1988	Tony Award	Best Original Score	Andrew Lloyd Webber, Charles Hart and Richard Stilgoe	Nominated
1988	Tony Award	Best Scenic Design	Maria Björnson	Won
1988	Tony Award	Best Costume Design	Maria Björnson	Won
1988	Tony Award	Best Lighting Design	Andrew Bridge	Won
1988	Tony Award	Best Choreography	Gillian Lynne	Nominated
1988	Drama Desk Award	Outstanding Musical		Nominated
1988	Drama Desk Award	Outstanding Actor in a Musical	Michael Crawford	Won
1988	Drama Desk Award	Outstanding Actress in a Musical	Sarah Brightman	Nominated
1988	Drama Desk Award	Outstanding Director of a Musical	Harold Prince	Won
1988	Drama Desk Award	Outstanding Music	Andrew Lloyd Webber	Won
1988	Drama Desk Award	Outstanding Orchestrations	David Cullen and Andrew Lloyd Webber	Won
1988	Drama Desk Award	Outstanding Set Design	Maria Björnson	Won
1988	Drama Desk Award	Outstanding Costume Design	Maria Björnson	Won
1988	Drama Desk Award	Outstanding Lighting Design	Andrew Bridge	Won
1988	Outer Critics Circle Award	Best Broadway Musical		Won
1988	Outer Critics Circle Award	Best Actor in a Musical	Michael Crawford	Won
1988	Outer Critics Circle Award	Best Set Design	Maria Björnson	Won
1988	Outer Critics Circle Award	Best Costume Design	Maria Björnson	Won
1988	Outer Critics Circle Award	Best Lighting Design	Andrew Bridge	Won
1988	New York Drama Critics' Circle Award	Best Musical	Andrew Lloyd Webber, Charles Hart and Richard Stilgoe	Runner-up

=== Masquerade ===
Year	Award	Category	Work	Result	Ref.
2026	Drama League Awards	Outstanding Revival of a Musical		Nominated	
2026	Drama Desk Awards	Outstanding Creative Collaboration		Won	
2026	Outer Critics Circle Award	Outstanding Revival of a Musical		Nominated	
2026	Outer Critics Circle Award	Outstanding Direction of a Musical	Diane Paulus	Nominated	
2026	Outer Critics Circle Award	Outstanding Choreography	Sidi Larbi Cherkaoui	Nominated	
2026	Outer Critics Circle Award	Outstanding Scenic Design	James Fluhr	Nominated	
2026	Outer Critics Circle Award	Outstanding Costume Design	Emilio Sosa	Nominated	
2026	Outer Critics Circle Award	Outstanding Sound Design	Brett Jarvis	Nominated	

== See also ==
- Il fantasma dell'opera
- Phantom
- Love Never Dies
- List of Tony Award- and Olivier Award-winning musicals
- List of best-selling albums in New Zealand
- List of best-selling albums
- Tony Award for Best Musical

Preceded by Cats	Longest-running Broadway show 2006–present	Succeeded by —
