= Tim Martin Gleason =

American actor

Tim Martin Gleason is an American actor known for his roles as Raoul, Vicomte de Chagny and the title character in the musical The Phantom of the Opera. He has also appeared in films and television episodes.

== Early life and education ==
Gleason was born in Piscataway, New Jersey. He earned a Bachelor of Arts degree in psychology from Saint Joseph's University in Pennsylvania. Gleason performed in theatre productions in high school and college.

== Career ==
In 2005 and from May 2009 to November 2010, Gleason starred as The Phantom in Andrew Lloyd Webber's The Phantom of the Opera. He completed a record-setting tenure as Raoul, Vicomte de Chagny with three different American companies of The Phantom of the Opera. Initially a member of the ensemble of the touring company in 2001, Gleason quickly took over the role of Raoul, playing the role for over three years. He was then asked to join the Broadway production to be Raoul and a Phantom understudy for the record-breaking company when Phantom became the longest-running show in Broadway history.

Gleason was then chosen by the creative team to originate the role of Raoul for Phantom: The Las Vegas Spectacular at the Venetian Hotel in Las Vegas. He rejoined the Broadway cast in September 2007 and played Raoul for an additional year and a half. With his time in all three companies, Gleason is the longest-running Raoul in American history, having played the role more than 2,600 times.

Prior to his success with Phantom, he appeared as Romeo in Terrence Mann's Romeo & Juliet: The Rock Opera at The Goodspeed Opera House and Adam Gernstein in The Rhythm Club at the Signature Theatre, a role for which he received a Helen Hayes Award nomination.

He has performed in theaters all across the country portraying many roles, including Tony in West Side Story, Tommy in The Who's Tommy, Joseph in Joseph and the Amazing Technicolor Dreamcoat, Cinderella’s Prince/Wolf and Rapunzel's Prince in Into the Woods, and Henrik in A Little Night Music.

In 2015, he appeared as Tom Burke in the Amazon series The Kicks. Gleason is a member of Actors' Equity Association (AEA).

== Filmography ==
=== Film ===
Year	Title	Role	Notes
2015	Pass the Light	Dale	
2016	Road to the Well	Tom	
2018	Bumblebee	Charlie's Dad	

=== Television ===
Year	Title	Role	Notes
2008	One Life to Live	Christina's Husband	Episode: "Christina Comes Home for Christmas"
2012	Undercovers	Jerry Knox	Episode: "The Reason"
2012	Criminal Minds	Todd Ashwood	Episode: "Closing Time"
2012	GCB	Lawyer	Episode: "A Wolf in Sheep's Clothing"
2012	The Closer	Wally Sanders	Episode: "Drug Fiend"
2013	Newsreaders	Angry Detractor	Episode: "Gay Camp"
2013	Monday Mornings	Dan Ford	Episode: "Truth or Consequences"
2014	Drop Dead Diva	Rodney Rykoff	Episode: "No Return"
2014	New Girl	Minister	Episode: "The Last Wedding"
2015–2016	The Kicks	Tom Burke	10 episodes
2017	Chicago Med	Kevin	Episode: "White Butterflies"
2019	Unbelievable	Bennett	3 episodes
2020	9-1-1	Dominic Blakely	Episode: "Seize the Day"
2020–2021	Good Trouble	Dan Solomon	5 episodes
2021	Impeachment: American Crime Story	Mitchell Ettinger	Episode: "Do You Hear What I Hear?"
2021	FBI: Most Wanted	Stephen Beck	Episode: "Inherited"
