= Paul Ettore Tabone =

Australian singer and actor (born 1988)

- Born: May 11, 1988 (age 38); Ingham, Queensland, Australia
- Education: Central Queensland University
- Occupations: Singer; actor
- Website: https://paultabone.com/

Paul Ettore Tabone is an Australian lyric tenor opera singer and musical theatre actor. Dubbed "Australia's own Bocelli," Tabone has performed at the Romanian National Opera, Bucharest, Teatro Carlo Felice in Italy, Teatro del Giglio in Italy, and on Broadway.

== Early life and career ==
Paul Ettore Tabone was born in Ingham, Queensland, in Australia. He moved to Mackay, Queensland, where he graduated with Bachelor of music theatre in 2009 at Central Queensland University's Conservatorium of Music.

Tabone made his solo opera debut in the world premiere of Opera Queensland's The Dirty Apple. In 2011, he performed the role of Squelch in Love Never Dies, Andrew Lloyd Webber's sequel to The Phantom of The Opera. In 2012, he moved to Italy to pursue his career in opera and studied as a lyric tenor. There, he was chosen by Nicoletta Mantovani, the wife of the late Luciano Pavarotti, to sing alongside Andrea Bocelli, Plácido Domingo, Jose Carraras, and Ambrogio Maestri as one of the four tenors at Pavarotti's 100th year birthday celebration. He relocated to London, where he performed the role of Ubaldo Piangi in The Phantom of the Opera at Her Majesty's Theatre in the original production on West End in 2016. As Piangi, he appeared in over 1200 performances. He performed this role until the shutdowns of the COVID-19 pandemic. He has also performed for Prince Harry and Meghan Markle.

During the COVID-19 pandemic, Tabone released his first studio album, titled This Is Me. Each song on the album reflects aspects of his journey, Australian and Italian heritages, and musical influences.

== Notable roles ==
- Ubaldo Piangi in The Phantom of the Opera by Andrew Lloyd Webber
- Squelch in Love Never Dies by Andrew Lloyd Webber
- Duke of Mantua in Rigoletto
- Pinkerton in Madama Butterfly
- Tony in West Side Story
