= Ben Crawford =

American singer and actor (born 1982)

- Born: May 22, 1982 (age 44); Tucson, Arizona
- Occupations: Singer, actor
- Known for: The Phantom of the Opera
- Partner(s): Kate Crawford (divorced); Kelsey Connolly
- Children: 2
- Website: https://www.ben-crawford.com/

Ben Crawford (born May 22, 1982) is an American singer and stage actor from Tucson, Arizona. He played the lead role of The Phantom in the Broadway production of The Phantom of the Opera for five years.

He made his Broadway debut in 2007 in Les Misérables as the understudy for Jean Valjean and Javert. His first principal role on Broadway was the title role in Shrek the Musical.

== Early life ==
Born and raised in Tucson, Arizona, Crawford received a BFA in Music Theatre from the University of Arizona.

== Personal life ==
On June 22, 2022, he announced his engagement via Instagram to former-Phantom costar, Kelsey Connolly.

== The Phantom of the Opera ==
Crawford made his debut performance in The Phantom of the Opera on April 16, 2018, following the tenure of Peter Joback. After a hiatus due to the COVID-19 pandemic, Crawford returned to the role in October 2021 and was set to be the final Phantom when the show closed after a record 35 year run on Broadway. However, he was forced out of the show on April 1, 2023 due to sickness. He was covered the last fifteen days by Jeremy Stolle, Ted Keegan, and Laird Mackintosh.

He has no relation to the originator of the role, Michael Crawford.

== Stage credits ==
Show	Role(s)	Year(s)	Production
Oliver!	Bill Sikes	2006	The Muny
Les Misérables	Courfeyrac / Factory Foreman / Brujon / Champmathieu u/s Jean Valjean u/s Inspector Javert	2007-2008	Broadway
Oklahoma!	Jud Fry	2008	Regional
Shrek the Musical	s/b Shrek	2008	Regional Tryout
Shrek the Musical	s/b Shrek	2008	Broadway
Shrek the Musical	s/b Shrek u/s Lord Farquaad	2009	Broadway
Shrek the Musical	Shrek	2009-2010	Broadway
Titanic	Frederick Barrett	2010	The Muny
Footloose	Chuck Cranston	2010	The Muny
Guys and Dolls	Sky Masterson	2011	US Tour
Next to Normal	Dr. Fine / Dr. Madden	2011	Regional
Merrily We Roll Along	Ensemble	2012	Encores!
Anastasia	Ensemble	2012	Reading
South Pacific	Luther Billis	2012	Regional
Big Fish	Don Price u/s Edward Bloom	2013	Regional Tryout
Big Fish	Don Price u/s Edward Bloom	2013	Broadway
On the Twentieth Century	Actor / Passenger / Ensemble u/s Bruce Granit u/s Max Jacobs	2015	Broadway
110 in the Shade	Bill Starbuck	2016	Regional
Evita	Che	2016	Regional
Wonderful Town	Wreck	2016	Los Angeles Opera
Charlie and the Chocolate Factory	Mr. Salt	2017-2018	Broadway
The Phantom of the Opera	The Phantom of the Opera	2018-2020	Broadway
The Phantom of the Opera	The Phantom of the Opera	2021-2023	Broadway
Beauty and the Beast	The Beast	2023	The Muny
42nd Street	Julian Marsh	2024	Broadway Sacramento
Waitress	Earl Hunterson	2024	The Muny
Little Shop of Horrors	Orin Scrivello	2024	Art Farm at Serenbe
The Lost Boys	Shopkeeper / Father / Vampire / Ensemble u/s Max	2026	Broadway
