= Maria Björnson =

Theatre designer

- Björnson in 1988
- Born: Maria Elena Björnson; 16 February 1949; Paris, France
- Died: 13 December 2002 (aged 53); London, England
- Education: Byam Shaw School of Art; Central School of Art and Design
- Known for: Theatre design; costume design
- Awards: Drama Desk Award for Outstanding Costume Design, 1988; Drama Desk Award for Outstanding Set Design, 1988; Tony Award for Best Scenic Design, 1988; Tony Award for Best Costume Design, 1988

Maria Elena Björnson (16 February 1949 – 13 December 2002) was a theatre designer. She was born in Paris to a Norwegian father and Romanian mother, and was the great-granddaughter of the Norwegian playwright Bjørnstjerne Bjørnson, who won the Nobel Prize in Literature in 1903.

== Life ==
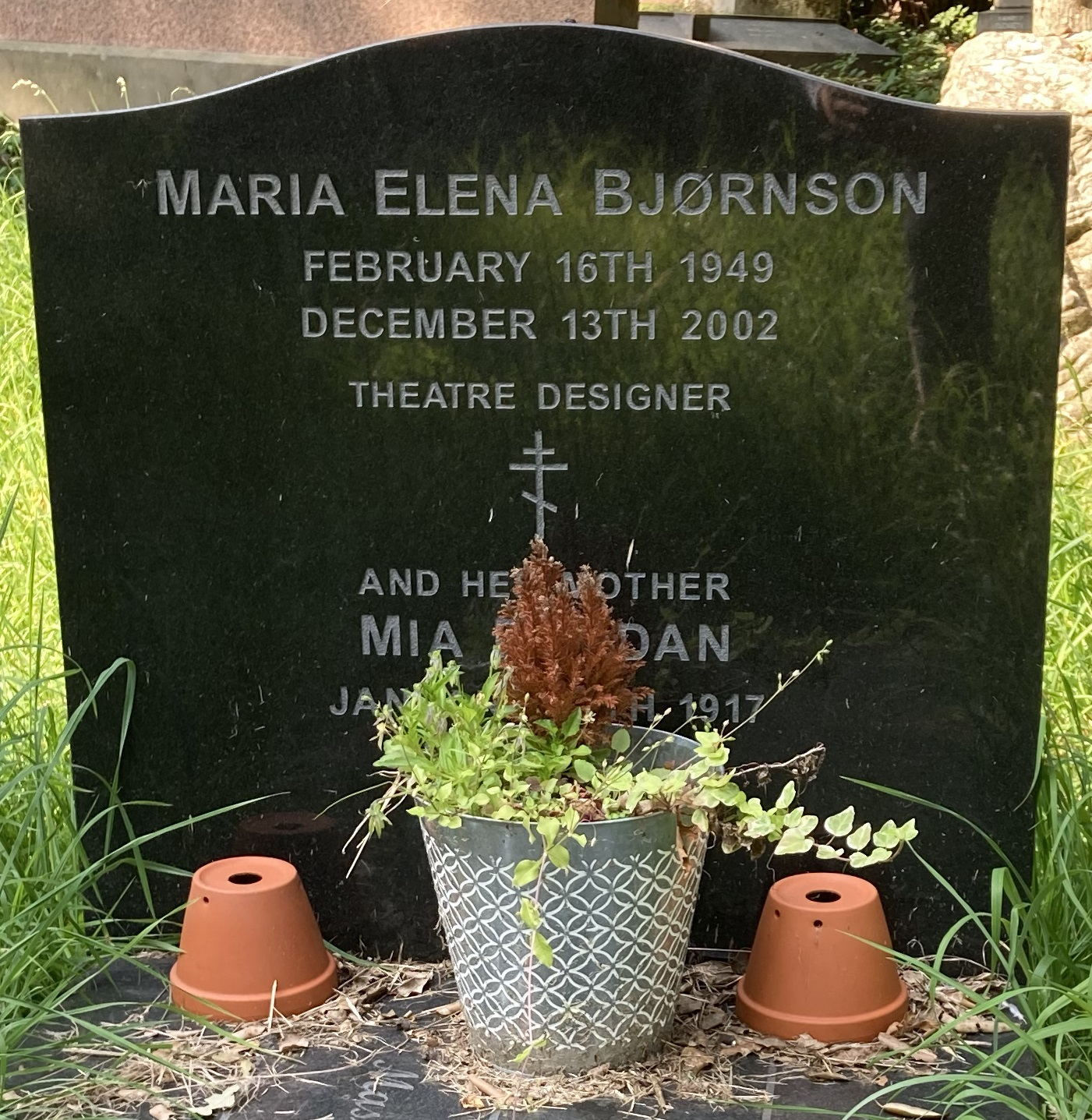
Her grave, in Kensal Green Cemetery

Björnson was born in Paris on 16 February 1949. Her father Bjørn was a businessman from Norway; her mother, Mia Prodan (full name Maria Prodan de Kisbunn), was from Romania. Both were from theatrical families. Björnson was raised by her mother in London. She studied at the Lycée Français, and then at the Byam Shaw School of Art and at the Central School of Art and Design.

She designed sets and costumes for theatre, ballet and opera. She worked for the Royal Shakespeare Company, and designed Andrew Lloyd Webber's The Phantom of the Opera – for which she won a Tony Award for Best Scenic Design and for Best Costume Design, and a Drama Desk Award for Outstanding Set Design and for Outstanding Costume Design – and the Trevor Nunn production of Aspects of Love.

Björnson was course director for theatre design at the Central School of Art and Design. She died of epilepsy at her home in Hammersmith on Friday 13 December 2002, and was buried in Kensal Green Cemetery. She was 53.

== Reception ==
In 2006, the refurbished Young Vic opened a new studio theatre named the "Maria" in her memory. The first performance there was Love and Money by Dennis Kelly, directed by Matthew Dunster and designed by Anna Fleischle.
