= Kevin Gray (actor) =

American actor (1958–2013)

- Born: February 25, 1958; Westport, Connecticut, USA
- Died: February 11, 2013 (aged 54); Hartford, Connecticut, USA
- Education: Duke University (BA); New York University (MFA)
- Occupation(s): Actor, singer, teacher
- Known for: The Phantom of the Opera; The King and I Miss Saigon

Kevin Gray (February 25, 1958 – February 11, 2013) was an American actor who worked primarily in musical theater.

== Education ==
Gray was a graduate of Duke University and member of Sigma Phi Epsilon fraternity.

== Career ==
He was the youngest actor to play the title role in The Phantom of the Opera on Broadway and in the U.S. national tour after a stint of playing Raoul on Broadway. He received a The Carbonell Award for his portrayal of the title role.

Gray played the King of Siam in the 1996 Broadway revival of The King and I, and in the UK touring production. He played Pontius Pilate in the 2000 Broadway revival of Jesus Christ Superstar. Gray played Kayama in the 1984 Off-Broadway revival of Stephen Sondheim's Pacific Overtures.

He received the Dora Mavor Moore Award for his role as The Engineer in the Toronto production of Miss Saigon and the Drama-Logue Award for his same portrayal in the Los Angeles production. He sang the role on the Complete Symphonic Cast Recording. He also toured the United States as Thomas Andrews in the musical Titanic. Gray played Gaylord Ravenal in Harold Prince's production of Show Boat. He originated the role of Valentin in Kiss of the Spider Woman.

Gray's television roles include the daytime dramas Ryan's Hope and Guiding Light and the prime-time series Law & Order: Special Victims Unit, Law & Order: Criminal Intent, Miami Vice and The Equalizer. He co-starred in the film White Hot. He also performed in stage productions of the Portland Stage Company, Boston Shakespeare Company, Stonington Shakespeare Company, The MUNY, and The Mount Gretna Playhouse.

== Personal life ==
Gray was a professor at Rollins College until 2011, when he went to the University of Hartford's Hartt School. At Rollins he taught Meisner Technique Acting for Musical Theatre. He served as Associate Professor of Theatre at the Hartt School.

Gray was married to Dodie Pettit, whom he met while acting in The Phantom of the Opera on Broadway. Gray and his wife performed together on two recordings: Voices of Broadway, a joint venture with Broadway Cares/Equity Fights AIDS, and Songs from the Journey.

== Death ==
Gray died suddenly of a heart attack on February 11, 2013, fourteen days away from his 55th birthday, and is survived by his wife Dodie Pettit.

== Filmography ==
Kevin Gray film and television credits
Year	Title	Role	Notes
1985	Miami Vice	First Grandson	1 episode
1985	The Equalizer	Dal	Episode: "China Rain"
1988	White Hot	Butchie	Film
1991	Perry Mason: The Case of the Maligned Mobster	Valet	TV movie
2000	Law & Order: Special Victims Unit	Henry Abidin	Episode: "Legacy"
2004	Law & Order: Criminal Intent	Gilbert Hicks	Episode: "Want"
