= Viscount Raoul de Chagny =

Raoul
- First appearance: The Phantom of the Opera (1909)
- Created by: Gaston Leroux
- Portrayed by: See "Other versions"

In-universe information
- Race: Caucasian
- Gender: Male
- Title: Vicomte de Chagny
- Occupation: Viscount; Police officer
- Family: Count Philibert de Chagny (father, deceased); Countess de Chagny-née de Moerogis de la Martynière (mother, deceased); Count Philippe Georges Marie de Chagny (brother, deceased in the original novel); Two sisters are mentioned once in the original novel. An old aunt, the widow of a navy sailor
- Spouse: Christine Daaé
- Nationality: French

Raoul, Vicomte de Chagny is a fictional character and one of the protagonists of Gaston Leroux's 1910 novel The Phantom of the Opera.

== Biography ==
Raoul is a viscount and Christine Daaé's childhood friend. They first met when he was a young child when he went on vacation in Northern France. He meets up with her again after watching her performance at the former managers' retirement ceremony at the Palais Garnier. He reminds her that he is "the little boy who went into the sea to rescue your scarf," which provokes her laughter. At first, Christine refuses to recognize Raoul, in fear that the "Angel of Music" would return to heaven. However, they become engaged later. Unknown to them, Erik, the "Angel of Music" of which Christine speaks (actually a musical genius who lives beneath the Opera), had been spying on them. On the day they were going to elope, Erik abducts her during a performance of Faust at the opera house. Raoul then, along with the mysterious man known only as The Persian, goes down into the cellars of the Opera in an attempt to rescue Christine. He and the Persian endure near-drowning and torture in a mirrored, super-heated chamber before Erik eventually relents due to Christine's willingness to sacrifice her happiness for Raoul's life. Raoul nearly commits suicide under torture, and, when Christine's marriage promise to Erik saves them, has to be put to bed by Erik because of a poison that has left him "limp as a rag."

In Gaston Leroux's novel, The Phantom of the Opera, Raoul is described as having a 'small, fair mustache, beautiful blue eyes, and a complexion like a girl's and an air of "just having left the women's apron-strings."' His elder brother and former guardian, Comte Philippe de Chagny, is a man of the world who indulges in dalliances with the Opera's ballerinas and is exasperated by his brother's attachment to "the little baggage" Christine. Philippe later drowns when he goes looking for Raoul in the cellars of the Opera.

Raoul is described as 'having been petted by his two sisters and his aunt' and spoiled as a child, but he is very kind-hearted. Raoul has been to sea, and had plans to go on a rescue expedition to the North Pole before falling in love with Christine. Christine decided they would play at being engaged as he was scheduled to leave the country, although she later begged him to take her away from the Phantom, no matter how much she resisted later. He is puzzled and sometimes angered by her allegiance to Erik, and thinks that she may be toying with his heart. He is the youngest member of his family, with an older brother (Philippe De Chagny) and two sisters already married. However, in the film adaptation of the Lloyd Webber musical, he mentions his still living parents (who had died long before the events of the novel). Christine's epitaph in the film reads "Countess de Chagny," which would make Raoul himself the Count de Chagny following the death of his parents after the events of the film.

== Other versions ==
=== Film ===
- 1925 – The Phantom of the Opera – portrayed by Norman Kerry
- 1943 – Phantom of the Opera – portrayed by Edgar Barrier
- 1962 – The Phantom of the Opera – portrayed by Edward de Souza (as Harry Hunter)
- 1983 – The Phantom of the Opera – portrayed by Michael York
- 1990 – The Phantom of the Opera – portrayed by Adam Storke (as Comte Philippe de Chagny, in Raoul's role)
- 1991 – The Phantom of the Opera – portrayed by Christopher Rath
- 1998 – The Phantom of the Opera – portrayed by Andrea di Stephano
- 2004 – The Phantom of the Opera – portrayed by Patrick Wilson
- 2011 - The Phantom of the Opera at the Royal Albert Hall (Home Media Recording) – Portrayed by Hadley Fraser.
- 2012 - Love Never Dies (Home Media Recording) - portrayed by Simon Gleeson

=== Theater ===
- Ken Hill's Phantom of the Opera – portrayed by various actors; the first actor to portray him beginning with the 1984 revival was James Saxon.
- Andrew Lloyd Webber's The Phantom of the Opera – portrayed by various actors, including Clive Carter in the first workshop and Steve Barton in the original West End and Broadway casts.
  - Other notable actors in the West End, Broadway, Australia, Canada, and Italy productions include Carter, Michael Ball, Bradley Jaden, Ramin Karimloo, Jordan Donica, Davis Gaines, Jason Forbach, Alexander Lewis, Michael Xavier, Hugh Panaro, Laird Mackintosh, John Barrowman, Simon Bowman, Simon Burke, Sean Palmer, Michael Cormick, Killian Donnelly, Alex Rathgeber, John Cudia, Tim Martin Gleason, Kevin Gray, Jay Armstrong Johnson, Brad Little, Gary Mauer, Ciarán Sheehan, Cris Groenendaal, and Aaron Lazar.
- The Phantom of the Opera at the Royal Albert Hall – Portrayed by Hadley Fraser.
- Maury Yeston and Arthur Kopit's musical Phantom replaced Raoul with his older brother Phillipe, a Count.
- Andrew Lloyd Webber's Love Never Dies
  - In the West End run: Portrayed originally by Joseph Millson and then David Thaxton until the show's closure in August 2011.
  - In the Australian tour: Portrayed by Simon Gleeson until the show's closure in April 2012.
  - In the Copenhagen run: Portrayed by Christian Berg until the show's closure in April 2013.
  - In the U.S. national tour: Portrayed by Sean Thompson until the show's closure in December 2018.
  - In the West End concert: Portrayed by Matthew Seadon-Young in August 2023
