= Thomas James O'Leary =

American actor

- Born: June 21, 1956 (age 69)
- Occupations: Actor, singer, director
- Website: www.thomasjamesolearydirector.com

Thomas James O'Leary (born June 21, 1956) is an American film, television, and theatre actor.

== Career ==
O'Leary began his acting career on the theater stage in New York, broadening to Broadway theaters, and finally to film and television. He was featured in the original Broadway cast of Miss Saigon and understudied the role of Freddie Trumper in the first US tour of Chess.

He played the Phantom in the Third National Touring production of Andrew Lloyd Webber's The Phantom of the Opera for over a year, and on Broadway from late 1996 to January 1999. He was chosen by Harold Prince to perform the title role for the 10th anniversary celebration in 1998.

== Personal life ==
O'Leary lives in Los Angeles.

== Filmography ==
=== Film ===
Year	Title	Role	Notes
2004	The Cookout	Reporter #1	

=== Television ===
Year	Title	Role	Notes
1987, 2000	Guiding Light	San Cristobel photographer / College Student	2 episodes
2001	Law & Order	Dr. Karl Breitel	Episode: "Ego"
2002, 2004	All My Children	Private jet pilot / Stable hand	2 episodes
2006	Related	Mark	Episode: "Sisters Are Forever"
2007	Monk	Menswear Clerk	Episode: "Mr. Monk and the Man Who Shot Santa Claus"
2007	General Hospital	Geoffrey	Episode #1.11460
