= Ciarán Sheehan (actor) =

Irish-born actor

Ciarán Sheehan (born 1961) is an Irish-born singer and actor who has appeared in several off-Broadway and Broadway theatre productions.

Born in Dublin, he made his Broadway debut in Les Misérables, playing Babet and understudying Marius Pontmercy. In 1993, he joined the cast of The Phantom of the Opera, where he played Raoul, Vicomte de Chagny. After leaving the cast of the Broadway production in 1995, he joined a Canadian production of the same musical until 1996.

He has worked with the Irish Repertory Theatre as an actor appearing in Frank McCourt's The Irish… and How They Got That Way, The Hostage, Camelot, and Finian's Rainbow.
