= Hugh Panaro =

American actor (born 1964)

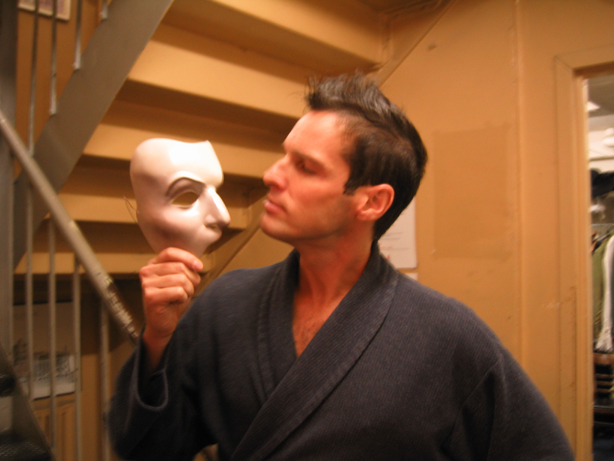
- Hugh Panaro, September 10, 2005, with the Phantom of the Opera mask.
- Born: February 19, 1964 (age 62); Philadelphia, Pennsylvania
- Occupations: Actor, Singer
- Notable work: The Phantom of the Opera
- Height: 6’0 (1.83)

Hugh Panaro (born February 19, 1964) is an American actor and singer. He is best known for his work in Broadway stage musicals, most well known for his role in The Phantom of the Opera, being in over 2,000 performances in the Broadway production.

His most recent stage performances have been Off-Broadway as the title role in the 2018 revival of Sweeney Todd: The Demon Barber of Fleet Street and in 2025 he reprised his role of The Phantom in the immersive revival in New York City.

== Early life ==
Hugh Panaro was born in Philadelphia, Pennsylvania and resided in the East Oak Lane section of the city with his family. As a schoolchild, he attended St. Helena’s parochial school in the adjoining Philadelphia neighborhood of Olney. He played organ for the parish church from age twelve. Panaro graduated from La Salle College High School, in Springfield (Montgomery County, Pennsylvania) in 1982.

== Career ==
Having a love for animals since childhood, he considered becoming a veterinarian, an ambition which was never fulfilled as he fell in love with theater after having seen his first Broadway musical, starring fellow Philadelphian and friend Andrea McArdle, as an adolescent. Panaro appeared in high school productions of Godspell and Pippin, as well as numerous regional and dinner theater productions throughout his teen years; with his first stage role being Friedrich in The Sound of Music. He began performing at the age of 13 and studied voice with Robert Grooters at the Boyer College of Music and Dance at Temple University.

His pre-Broadway and regional roles include 'Mary Sunshine' in Chicago (musical) and Jesus Christ in Jesus Christ Superstar. He made his Broadway debut as Marius in Les Misérables, a role he originated in the first U.S. national touring company. Panaro created the roles of Buddy in Side Show and Julian in Jule Styne's last musical, The Red Shoes. He made his West End debut in the original London company of Harold Prince's Show Boat as Ravenal, the role he played on Broadway and in Toronto.

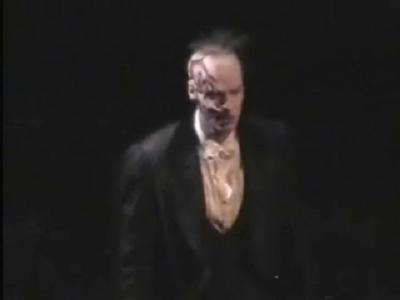
Panaro in Phantom's make-up.

At Avery Fisher Hall, he performed with the Radio City Rockettes in Jerry Herman's Mack and Mabel and also in The Stephen Sondheim Gala, the culmination of the Kennedy Center's "Summer of Sondheim," where Panaro played Anthony Hope in Sweeney Todd, with Brian Stokes Mitchell as Todd. He reprised the show and later in 2018, replacing Norm Lewis, his fellow Phantom friend, when he was playing the role of Sweeney Todd on the Off-Broadway stage 16 years later. In Los Angeles, Panaro played Franklin Shepard in Merrily We Roll Along and received an Ovation Award nomination for his performance as Kenneth in Call Me Madam, both for Reprise!. As a concert artist, Panaro has performed with symphony orchestras across the U.S. and abroad and can be heard on numerous recordings. He is one of the few actors to play both the roles of Raoul (1991) and the Phantom (1999) in the Broadway production of The Phantom of the Opera, but after wearing the mask for only a few months, he left to play the title role in the American premiere of Sir Cameron Mackintosh's Martin Guerre. Panaro returned to play the title role at the Majestic Theatre's production of Phantom until October 1, 2005. In late 2005 he created the title role in the Elton John musical, Lestat. At Seattle's 5th Avenue Theatre, he performed leading roles in two Stephen Sondheim musicals: Bobby in Company, and George in Sunday in the Park with George (the latter a recreation of the Menier Chocolate Factory production, directed by Sam Buntrock). In 1998, he appeared as a Hotel Clerk in one episode of Law & Order. He appeared in the 1997 romantic comedy, Broadway Damage.

He has performed in a number of concerts and benefits, including 'An Evening With Hugh Panaro' at the University of Findlay in Ohio, The Leading Men II at the venerable Birdland Jazz Club, and Broadway For Medicine at City Center. Following his performance in the March 26, 2007, Broadway Musicals of 1938 concert, Panaro invited fans to suggest songs for his first solo album. In the summer of 2007, Panaro was one of four Broadway performers joining Barbra Streisand on her first European concert tour. He starred as Jean Valjean in a new, non-replica production of Les Misérables at Philadelphia's Walnut Street Theatre for which he received the 2008 Barrymore Award for Outstanding Actor In A Musical.

In 2009, he starred in Sunday in the Park with George at the 5th Avenue Theatre in Seattle and appeared as 'Fagin' in Oliver! to rave reviews before hometown audiences at the Walnut Street Theatre, opening November 18, 2009, through January 10, 2010. He was later active as a concert artist appearing with symphonies throughout the United States and Canada.

Panaro returned to the title role in the Broadway production of The Phantom of the Opera on September 7, 2010. He replaced John Cudia in the role. This was Panaro's third time playing The Phantom in this production. In January 2013, he performed the role in the Broadway production's 25th anniversary. He took a break from Phantom from April until the end of August 2013. During this time, he reprised the role of Jean Valjean at The Muny in the St. Louis in their production of Les Misérables, alongside his idol and friend Norm Lewis as Javert. Panaro won a St. Louis Theater Circle Award for his portrayal of Valjean. Afterwards, he returned to the Majestic stage on August 26, starring opposite Mary Michael Patterson as Christine Daaé. Panaro's final performance as the Phantom was May 3. His former co-star and friend in Les Miserables, Norm Lewis, succeeded him in the role.

Beginning August 29, he assumed the lead from his friend Norm Lewis in the Off-Broadway production of Sweeney Todd at the Barrow Street Theater, sixteen years after playing Anthony Hope, along with Brian Stokes Mitchell, the other Sweeney Todd. He played the role through February 25, 2018. In 2011 he was the announced 'Maxim de Winter' in a later to be cancelled Broadway version of Rebecca. In July 2026, he reprised his role of Valjean at Radio City Music Hall in an encore performance of the song "One Day More" with actors Alfie Boe, Killian Donnelly, Aaron Tveit, and Gerónimo Rauch after a performance of Les Misérables.

== Stage work ==
- The Sound of Music - Friedrich (1976)
- The Boyfriend
- Chicago - Mary Sunshine (1985-1986)
- Jesus Christ Superstar - Jesus of Nazareth (1986)
- South Pacific - Lt. Joseph Cable, USMC (1986)
- Noa Noa
- What's A Nice Country Doing In A State Like This?
- Les Misérables - Marius Pontmercy (1987-1990) - Broadway & US Tour
- Show Boat - Gaylord Ravenal - West End, Broadway & US Tour
- Side Show - Buddy Foster - Broadway
- Mack and Mabel
- Call Me Madam - Kenneth
- The Phantom of the Opera - Raoul, Vicomte de Chagny (1990-1993) - Broadway
- The Red Shoes - Julian (1993) - Broadway
- The Phantom of the Opera - The Phantom of the Opera (1999) - Broadway
- Martin Guerre - Martin Guerre (1999) - US Tour
- Sweeney Todd: The Demon Barber of Fleet Street - Anthony Hope (2002)
- Merrily We Roll Along - Franklin Shepard (2002)
- Little Fish - Robert
- The Phantom of the Opera - The Phantom of the Opera (2003–2005) - Broadway
- Lestat (musical) - Lestat (2005) - Broadway
- Company - Bobby (2006)
- Guys and Dolls - Sky Masterson (2008)
- Les Misérables - Jean Valjean (2008 & 2013)
- Sunday In The Park With George - Georges Seurat/George (2009)
- Oliver! - Fagin - Walnut Street Theatre (Nov. 2009-Jan. 2010)
- The Phantom of the Opera - The Phantom of the Opera (2010-2013, 2013-2014) - Broadway
- Sweeney Todd: The Demon Barber of Fleet Street - Sweeney Todd (Aug. 2017-Feb. 2018) - Off-Broadway
- Masquerade - The Phantom of the Opera (2025-2026) - Off-Broadway
