= Howard McGillin =

American actor

- Born: Los Angeles, California, United States
- Occupations: Actor, vocalist
- Years active: 1970s–present
- Known for: The Phantom of the Opera, The Mystery of Edwin Drood
- Spouses: Mary Lloyd-Butler (m. 1976; div. 1990) Richard Samson (m. 2013)
- Children: 2

Howard McGillin is an American actor and music vocalist. He is known for originating the role of John Jasper in The Mystery of Edwin Drood (1985) and for portraying the title role in Andrew Lloyd Webber's The Phantom of the Opera from 1999 to 2009 on Broadway.

== Biography ==
=== Early life and career ===
McGillin was born in Los Angeles, California. His father William was an accountant, and his mother Margaret was an administrator at Santa Barbara City College. McGillin graduated from Dos Pueblos High School and the University of California, Santa Barbara. While in college, he appeared at the Sacramento Music Circus in seven musicals.

He began his career on television, working as a contract player for Universal Studios, and his early film and TV credits include roles in McMillan & Wife (1976), The Six Million Dollar Man (2 episodes, 1976), Emergency! (2 episodes, 1976 and 1977), The Bionic Woman (2 episodes, 1976), The Rockford Files (1977), Columbo (1977), Mary White (1977), Wheels (1978), Women in White (1979) and Where the Boys Are '84 (1984). He moved to New York City with the intention of pursuing a career on Broadway, and was cast as one of the male leads in the New York Shakespeare Festival's 1984 production of La Boheme, which starred Linda Ronstadt. The New York Times reviewer, Frank Rich, called McGillin "dashing".

=== Career ===
Other featured and leading roles on the stage followed. Often considered a "tall, dark and handsome" leading man, McGillin originated the role of John Jasper in The Mystery of Edwin Drood at the Imperial Theatre; for his performance he was nominated for a 1986 Tony Award for Best Featured Actor in a Musical. He earned a second Tony nomination in 1988 for his portrayal of Billy Crocker in the Broadway revival of Cole Porter's Anything Goes. In 1991, he replaced Mandy Patinkin as Archibald Craven in the Broadway company of The Secret Garden.

McGillin starred in the award-winning West End 1995 production of Mack & Mabel and sings on the cast album recording. He received praise as Molina in the Kander and Ebb musical Kiss of the Spider Woman, replacing Brent Carver in 1994.

The New York Times reviewer wrote: "In an impressive change of pace from the smooth philanderer he played in 'She Loves Me,' Howard McGillin is Molina...Mr. McGillin can be almost boyishly blithe at times. He embraces Aurora's campy films with the flair of the musical-comedy aficionado...While Mr. McGillin is playing up Molina's more exuberant charm, Mr. [Brian Stokes] Mitchell is playing down Valentin's brusque condescension. As a result, the growing affection between them seems the more believable." Due to their performances and that of leading lady Vanessa Williams, the show received a rare second cast recording.

McGillin originated a leading role in the world premiere of Stephen Sondheim's musical Bounce at the Goodman Theatre, Chicago, and the Kennedy Center in 2003. He was featured in the Encores! production of the Ziegfeld Follies of 1936 in 1999.

He appeared in the Irish Repertory Theatre (New York City) concert, A Child's Christmas in Wales in Concert in December 2011.

McGillin has continued to perform in television and film as a voice-over artist. He provided the singing voice of Gregory in South Park: Bigger, Longer & Uncut and he has narrated many books on tape and programs/commercials on television (including the PBS series Nature). He voiced Prince Derek in the animated film The Swan Princess (1994). McGillin has released one solo CD, Where Time Stands Still. He has contributed to numerous cast recordings, including those of The Mystery of Edwin Drood, Anything Goes, and Bounce.

McGillin holds the record for the most performances by an actor in the title role of the Broadway production of the musical The Phantom of the Opera, joining the Broadway cast in 1999. He was part of the musical when it became the longest-running production in Broadway history on January 9, 2006, and its twenty-first anniversary on January 26, 2009. McGillin played his last performance in the role on July 25, 2009, marking his 2,544th show.

He performed in the York Theatre production of I Remember Mama, which ran from October 8–10, 2010.

McGillin starred as Sir Francis Chesney in the New York City Center Encores! production of Where's Charley? from March 17–20, 2011. He played Applegate in the Paper Mill Playhouse production of Damn Yankees! in Millburn, New Jersey, which ran from March 7, 2012, through April 1, 2012.

In 2023, McGillin returned to Broadway in the revival of Parade playing the Old Soldier and Judge Roan.

== Personal life ==
McGillin married Mary Lloyd-Butler in 1976; the couple divorced in 1990. McGillin married his longtime partner, lawyer and theatrical producer Richard Samson, in September 2013. McGillin has two sons, Brian and Christopher.

== Selected stage credits ==
=== Broadway ===
Source: Playbill Vault

- Sunday in the Park with George (Soldier/Alex, u/s Georges/George replacement) (1985)
- Follies (Young Ben) (1985 Concert)
- The Mystery of Edwin Drood (John Jasper) (1985): Tony Award nomination; Drama Desk Award nomination; Theatre World Award
- Anything Goes (Billy Crocker) (1987): Tony Award nomination; Drama Desk Award nomination
- The Secret Garden (Lord Archibald Craven replacement) (1991-1993)
- She Loves Me (Kodaly) (1993-1994)
- Kiss of the Spider Woman (Molina replacement) (1994)
- Sunday in the Park with George (Soldier/Alex) (1994 Concert)
- The Phantom of the Opera (The Phantom of the Opera replacement) (1999- July 25, 2009) (Longest running Phantom, in Broadway history)
- Gigi (Honoré Lachaille) (2015)
- Parade (Old Confederate Soldier/Judge Roan) (2023)

=== West End ===
- Anything Goes (Billy Crocker) (1989)
- Mack & Mabel (Mack) (1995)

=== Other ===
- Into the Woods (June 1986 Workshop) (The Wolf/Cinderella's Prince)
- As Thousands Cheer (June 1998) (Drama Dept., Off-Broadway)
- Ziegfeld Follies of 1936 (Encores!, 1999)
- Bounce (2003 world premiere: Helen Hayes Award nomination)
- Peter Pan (2004 national tour) (Captain Hook/Mr. Darling)
- A Child's Christmas in Wales (Concert, December 2011)
- Where's Charley? (Sir Francis Chesney) (Encores!, 2011)
- Damn Yankees! (Mr. Applegate) (Paper Mill Playhouse, March 2012)
- Ragtime (Father) (Avery Fisher Hall, 2013)
- Parade (Governor John Slaton) (Roundabout Theatre Company Workshop, 2018)
- Parade (Luther Rosser) (Encores!, 2022)

== Filmography ==
=== Film ===
Year	Title	Role	Notes
1977	Mary White	Richard Solan III	TV movie
1978	Long Journey Back	Steve	TV movie
1979	Woman in White	Dr. Frank Evanhauer	TV movie
1979	Love's Savage Fury	Ferris	TV movie
1982	Take Your Best Shot	Dean Hilliard	
1984	Where the Boys Are	Chip	
1989	Little Nemo: Adventures in Slumberland	Singer	Voice; Uncredited
1991	Perry Mason: The Case of the Maligned Mobster	Mike Calder	TV movie
1991	Company Business	Bruce Wilson	
1991	Mimi & Me	Howard Raney	TV movie
1994	The Swan Princess	Prince Derek	Voice
1996	The Hunchback of Notre Dame	Additional voices	Voice
1997	Beauty and the Beast: The Enchanted Christmas	Chorus (singing voice)	Direct-to-video; Voice
1998	The Swan Princess: Sing Along	Prince Derek	Short; Voice
1999	South Park: Bigger, Longer & Uncut	Gregory (singing voice)	Voice; Uncredited
2021	tick, tick... BOOM!	'Sunday' Legend #7	

=== Television ===
Year	Title	Role	Notes
1976	McMillan & Wife	Bellboy	1 episode
1976	City of Angels	Man at Beach	1 episode
1976	The Six Million Dollar Man	2nd Young Man; Worker	2 episodes
1977	How the West Was Won	Lt. Cartwright	1 episode
1976-1977	Emergency!	Paramedic Dwyer	2 episodes
1976-1977	The Bionic Woman	Staff Sgt. Sgt. Don Woods	2 episodes
1977	The Rockford Files	Davey Woodhull	1 episode
1977	Columbo	George Camponella	1 episode
1977	Kingston: Confidential	Jim Darrow	1 episode
1977	The Oregon Trail	Stephen McKay	1 episode
1978	What Really Happened to the Class of '65?	Bo	1 episode
1978	Wheels	Greg Trenton	TV miniseries 1 episode
1975-1978	Switch	1st Policeman; Paul Alexander	2 episodes
1979	The MacKenzies of Paradise Cove	—N/a	1 episode
1979	California Fever	Tony	1 episode
1979-1980	Insight	John Hopkins; Defense Attorney	2 episodes
1980	Number 96	Mark Keaton	1 episode
1981-1982	The Young and the Restless	Greg Foster #4	1 episode
1983	St. Elsewhere	Scott	
1984	Days of Our Lives	Minister	4 episodes
1986	Great Performances	Young Ben	1 episode
1986	Search for Tomorrow	Dr. Cooper	1 episode
1987	As the World Turns	Colin Crowley	1 episode
1990	Murder, She Wrote	Charles Lockner	1 episode
1991	Stat	Randall Forbes	1 episode
1992	Jack's Place	—N/a	
1998	ER	Herrgut	
1999	Too Rich: The Secret Life of Doris Duke	James Cromwell	TV miniseries 2 episodes
1999	One Life to Live	Roy Calhoun	
2003-2004	Nature	Narrator	5 episodes
2013	Elementary	Davis Renkin	1 episode
2016	The Good Wife	Lloyd Garber	2 episode
2019	The Blacklist	Senator Chuck Christensen	2 episode
2023	Rock Hudson: All That Heaven Allowed	Self - Rock Hudson's Friend	Documentary film
