= List of accolades received by Les Misérables (2012 film) =

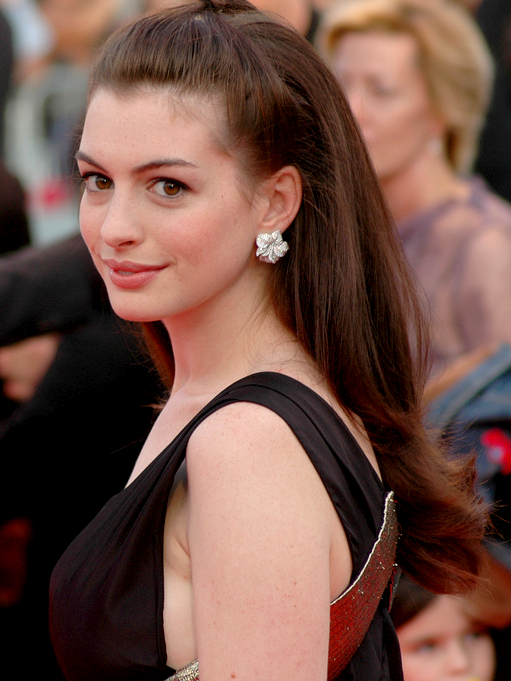
- Anne Hathaway received multiple awards and nominations for her performance in the film.
Accolades
Award	Wins	Nominations
AACTA International Awards	0	2
AARP Movies for Grownups Awards	0	1
Academy Awards	3	8
ACE Eddie Awards	0	1
African-American Film Critics Association	0	1
Alliance of Women Film Journalists	2	4
American Film Institute Awards	1	1
American Society of Cinematographers	0	1
Art Directors Guild Awards	0	1
Artios Awards	0	1
ASCAP Film and Television Music Awards	1	1
Austin Film Critics Association	1	1
British Academy Film Awards	4	9
Chicago Film Critics Association	0	3
Cinema Audio Society Awards	1	1
Costume Designers Guild Awards	0	1
Christopher Awards	1	1
Critics' Choice Movie Awards	1	11
Dallas–Fort Worth Film Critics Association	1	3
Detroit Film Critics Society	1	1
Directors Guild of America Awards	0	1
Dorian Awards	1	4
Empire Awards	1	2
Florida Film Critics Circle	1	1
Golden Globe Awards	3	4
Golden Reel Awards	1	1
Golden Trailer Awards	1	6
Grammy Awards	0	1
Hollywood Film Awards	2	2
Hollywood Post Alliance Awards	0	1
Houston Film Critics Society	1	6
ICG Publicists Awards	0	1
Japan Academy Film Prize	1	1
Jupiter Awards	0	1
London Film Critics' Circle	1	4
Los Angeles Film Critics Association	1	1
Movieguide Awards	2	4
MTV Movie Awards	0	3
National Board of Review	2	2
National Society of Film Critics	0	1
New York Film Critics Online	2	2
Nikkan Sports Film Awards	1	1
Online Film Critics Society	1	1
Palm Springs International Film Festival	1	1
Producers Guild of America Awards	0	1
San Diego Film Critics Society	0	6
Santa Barbara International Film Festival	1	1
Satellite Awards	4	12
Saturn Awards	1	6
Screen Actors Guild Awards	1	4
St. Louis Film Critics Association	0	1
Teen Choice Awards	0	7
Toronto Film Critics Association	1	1
Turkish Film Critics Association	0	1
Vancouver Film Critics Circle	0	1
Washington D.C. Area Film Critics Association	2	8
Women Film Critics Circle	2	2
Young Artist Awards	1	2

Totals (Note: Certain award groups do not simply award one winner. They acknowledge several different recipients, have runners-up, and have third place. Since this is a specific recognition and is different from losing an award, runner-up mentions are considered wins in this award tally. For simplification and to avoid errors, each award in this list has been presumed to have had a prior nomination.)
- Wins: 53
- Nominations: 158

Les Misérables is a 2012 epic period musical film directed by Tom Hooper from a screenplay by William Nicholson, Alain Boublil, who wrote the original French lyrics, Claude-Michel Schönberg, who wrote the music, and Herbert Kretzmer, who wrote the English lyrics. The film is based on the 1985 West End English translation of the 1980 French musical by Boublil and Schönberg, which itself is adapted from the 1862 French novel of the same name by Victor Hugo. The film stars an ensemble cast led by Hugh Jackman, Russell Crowe, Anne Hathaway, Eddie Redmayne, Amanda Seyfried, Helena Bonham Carter, and Sacha Baron Cohen.

Les Misérables received eight Academy Award nominations, including Best Picture, and won three: Best Supporting Actress for Hathaway, Best Sound Mixing, and Best Makeup and Hairstyling.

== Accolades ==
Accolades received by Les Misérables (2012 film)
Award / Association / Film festival	Date of ceremony	Category	Nominee(s)	Result	Ref.
AACTA International Awards	26 January 2013	Best Actor – International	Hugh Jackman	Nominated	
AACTA International Awards	26 January 2013	Best Film – International	Tim Bevan, Eric Fellner, Debra Hayward, and Cameron Mackintosh	Nominated	
AARP Movies for Grownups Awards	4 February 2013	Best Movie for Grownups	Les Misérables	Nominated	
Academy Awards	24 February 2013	Best Actor	Hugh Jackman	Nominated	
Academy Awards	24 February 2013	Best Costume Design	Paco Delgado	Nominated	
Academy Awards	24 February 2013	Best Makeup and Hairstyling	Lisa Westcott and Julie Dartnell	Won	
Academy Awards	24 February 2013	Best Original Song	Claude-Michel Schönberg, Herbert Kretzmer and Alain Boublil (for "Suddenly")	Nominated	
Academy Awards	24 February 2013	Best Picture	Tim Bevan, Eric Fellner, Debra Hayward and Cameron Mackintosh	Nominated	
Academy Awards	24 February 2013	Best Production Design	Production Design: Eve Stewart; Set Decoration: Anna Lynch-Robinson	Nominated	
Academy Awards	24 February 2013	Best Supporting Actress	Anne Hathaway	Won	
Academy Awards	24 February 2013	Best Sound Mixing	Andy Nelson, Mark Paterson and Simon Hayes	Won	
ACE Eddie Awards	16 February 2013	Best Edited Feature Film – Comedy or Musical	Chris Dickens and Melanie Oliver	Nominated	
African-American Film Critics Association	8 February 2013	Top Ten Films	Les Misérables	6th place	
Alliance of Women Film Journalists	7 January 2013	Best Breakthrough Performance	Samantha Barks	Nominated	
Alliance of Women Film Journalists	7 January 2013	Best Supporting Actress	Anne Hathaway	Won	
Alliance of Women Film Journalists	7 January 2013	Movie You Wanted To Love But Just Couldn’t	Les Misérables	Nominated	
Alliance of Women Film Journalists	7 January 2013	Unforgettable Moment	Anne Hathaway	Won	
American Film Institute Awards	11 January 2013	Movies of the Year	Les Misérables	Won	
American Society of Cinematographers	10 February 2013	Outstanding Achievement in Cinematography in Theatrical Releases	Danny Cohen	Nominated	
Art Directors Guild Awards	2 February 2013	Excellence in Production Design for a Period Film	Eve Stewart	Nominated	
Artios Awards	18 November 2013	Outstanding Achievement in Casting – Big Budget Feature (Drama)	Nina Gold	Nominated	
ASCAP Film and Television Music Awards	20 June 2013	Top Box Office Films	Claude-Michel Schönberg, Herbert Kretzmer, and Alain Boublil	Won	
Austin Film Critics Association	18 December 2012	Best Supporting Actress	Anne Hathaway	Won	
British Academy Film Awards	10 February 2013	Best Actor in a Leading Role	Hugh Jackman	Nominated	
British Academy Film Awards	10 February 2013	Best Actress in a Supporting Role	Anne Hathaway	Won	
British Academy Film Awards	10 February 2013	Best British Film	Tom Hooper, Tim Bevan, Eric Fellner, Debra Hayward, and Cameron Mackintosh, William Nicholson, Alain Boublil, Claude-Michel Schönberg, and Herbert Kretzmer	Nominated	
British Academy Film Awards	10 February 2013	Best Cinematography	Danny Cohen	Nominated	
British Academy Film Awards	10 February 2013	Best Costume Design	Paco Delgado	Nominated	
British Academy Film Awards	10 February 2013	Best Film	Tim Bevan, Eric Fellner, Debra Hayward, and Cameron Mackintosh	Nominated	
British Academy Film Awards	10 February 2013	Best Makeup and Hair	Lisa Westcott	Won	
British Academy Film Awards	10 February 2013	Best Production Design	Eve Stewart and Anna Lynch-Robinson	Won	
British Academy Film Awards	10 February 2013	Best Sound	Andy Nelson, Mark Paterson, and Simon Hayes, Jonathan Allen, Lee Walpole, and John Warhurst	Won	
Chicago Film Critics Association	17 December 2012	Best Art Direction	Les Misérables	Nominated	
Chicago Film Critics Association	17 December 2012	Best Supporting Actress	Anne Hathaway	Nominated	
Chicago Film Critics Association	17 December 2012	Most Promising Performer	Samantha Barks	Nominated	
Cinema Audio Society Awards	17 February 2013	Outstanding Achievement in Sound Mixing for a Motion Picture – Live Action	Andy Nelson, Mark Paterson, and Simon Hayes, Jonathan Allen, Robert Edwards, and Peter D. Smith	Won	
Costume Designers Guild Awards	19 February 2013	Excellence in Period Film	Paco Delgado	Nominated	
Christopher Awards	23 May 2013	Feature films	Les Misérables	Won	
Critics' Choice Movie Awards	10 January 2013	Best Acting Ensemble	Les Misérables	Nominated	
Critics' Choice Movie Awards	10 January 2013	Best Actor	Hugh Jackman	Nominated	
Critics' Choice Movie Awards	10 January 2013	Best Art Direction	Eve Stewart and Anna Lynch-Robinson	Nominated	
Critics' Choice Movie Awards	10 January 2013	Best Cinematography	Danny Cohen	Nominated	
Critics' Choice Movie Awards	10 January 2013	Best Costume Design	Paco Delgado	Nominated	
Critics' Choice Movie Awards	10 January 2013	Best Editing	Chris Dickens and Melanie Oliver	Nominated	
Critics' Choice Movie Awards	10 January 2013	Best Director	Tom Hooper	Nominated	
Critics' Choice Movie Awards	10 January 2013	Best Makeup	Les Misérables	Nominated	
Critics' Choice Movie Awards	10 January 2013	Best Picture	Les Misérables	Nominated	
Critics' Choice Movie Awards	10 January 2013	Best Song	Hugh Jackman, Claude-Michel Schönberg, Herbert Kretzmer, and Alain Boublil (for "Suddenly")	Nominated	
Critics' Choice Movie Awards	10 January 2013	Best Supporting Actress	Anne Hathaway	Won	
Dallas–Fort Worth Film Critics Association	18 December 2012	Best Actor	Hugh Jackman	4th place	
Dallas–Fort Worth Film Critics Association	18 December 2012	Best Film	Les Misérables	5th place	
Dallas–Fort Worth Film Critics Association	18 December 2012	Best Supporting Actress	Anne Hathaway	Runner-up	
Detroit Film Critics Society	14 December 2012	Best Supporting Actress	Anne Hathaway	Won	
Directors Guild of America Awards	2 February 2013	Outstanding Directorial Achievement in Motion Pictures	Tom Hooper	Nominated	
Dorian Awards	17 February 2013	Film of the Year	Les Misérables	Nominated	
Dorian Awards	17 February 2013	Film Performance of the Year – Actor	Hugh Jackman	Nominated	
Dorian Awards	17 February 2013	Film Performance of the Year – Actress	Anne Hathaway	Won	
Dorian Awards	17 February 2013	Visually Striking Film of the Year	Les Misérables	Nominated	
Empire Awards	24 March 2013	Best Female Newcomer	Samantha Barks	Won	
Empire Awards	24 March 2013	Best British Film	Les Misérables	Nominated	
Florida Film Critics Circle	18 December 2012	Best Supporting Actress	Anne Hathaway	Won	
Golden Globe Awards	13 January 2013	Best Actor – Motion Picture Musical or Comedy	Hugh Jackman	Won	
Golden Globe Awards	13 January 2013	Best Motion Picture – Musical or Comedy	Les Misérables	Won	
Golden Globe Awards	13 January 2013	Best Original Song	Claude-Michel Schönberg, Herbert Kretzmer, and Alain Boublil (for "Suddenly")	Nominated	
Golden Globe Awards	13 January 2013	Best Supporting Actress – Motion Picture	Anne Hathaway	Won	
Golden Reel Awards	17 February 2013	Best Sound Editing – Music – Musical Feature Film	Gerard McCann, John Warhurst, Rob Houston, James Bellamy, Rael Jones, Tim Hands, and Alastair Sirkett	Won	
Golden Trailer Awards	3 May 2013	Best Drama Poster	Les Misérables (for "Photo girl")	Nominated	
Golden Trailer Awards	3 May 2013	Best Drama TV Spot	Les Misérables (for "Dream 60 TV Spot")	Nominated	
Golden Trailer Awards	3 May 2013	Best Music	Les Misérables (for "I Dreamed a Dream")	Won	
Golden Trailer Awards	3 May 2013	Best Music TV Spot	Les Misérables (for "Medley")	Nominated	
Golden Trailer Awards	3 May 2013	Best Romance Poster	Les Misérables (for "Character One-Sheets")	Nominated	
Golden Trailer Awards	3 May 2013	Best Romance TV Spot	Les Misérables (for "Passion")	Nominated	
Grammy Awards	26 January 2014	Best Compilation Soundtrack for Visual Media	Cameron Mackintosh, Lee McCutcheon, and Stephen Metcalfe (for Les Misérables (Deluxe Edition))	Nominated	
Hollywood Film Awards	22 October 2012	Best Trailer	Erin Wyatt	Won	
Hollywood Film Awards	22 October 2012	Spotlight Award	Samantha Barks	Won	
Hollywood Post Alliance Awards	7 November 2013	Outstanding Editing – Feature Film	Chris Dickens and Melanie Oliver	Nominated	
Houston Film Critics Society	5 January 2013	Best Actor	Hugh Jackman	Nominated	
Houston Film Critics Society	5 January 2013	Best Cinematography	Les Misérables	Nominated	
Houston Film Critics Society	5 January 2013	Best Picture	Les Misérables	Nominated	
Houston Film Critics Society	5 January 2013	Best Director	Tom Hooper	Nominated	
Houston Film Critics Society	5 January 2013	Best Song	"Suddenly"	Nominated	
Houston Film Critics Society	5 January 2013	Best Supporting Actress	Anne Hathaway	Won	
ICG Publicists Awards	22 February 2013	Maxwell Weinberg Publicists Showmanship Motion Picture Award	Les Misérables	Nominated	
Japan Academy Film Prize	7 March 2014	Outstanding Foreign Language Film	Les Misérables	Won	
Jupiter Awards	26 March 2014	Best International Film	Les Misérables	Nominated	
London Film Critics' Circle	20 January 2013	Actor of the Year	Hugh Jackman	Nominated	
London Film Critics' Circle	20 January 2013	British Film of the Year	Les Misérables	Nominated	
London Film Critics' Circle	20 January 2013	Supporting Actress of the Year	Anne Hathaway	Won	
London Film Critics' Circle	20 January 2013	Young British Performer of the Year	Samantha Barks	Nominated	
Los Angeles Film Critics Association	9 December 2012	Best Supporting Actress	Anne Hathaway	Runner-up	
Movieguide Awards	15 February 2013	10 Best Movies for Mature Audiences	Les Misérables	Won	
Movieguide Awards	15 February 2013	Epiphany Prize for Most Inspiring Movie	Les Misérables	Won	
Movieguide Awards	15 February 2013	Grace Award for Most Inspiring Movie Performance	Hugh Jackman	Nominated	
Movieguide Awards	15 February 2013	Grace Award for Most Inspiring Movie Performance	Colm Wilkinson	Nominated	
MTV Movie Awards	14 April 2013	Best Female Performance	Anne Hathaway	Nominated	
MTV Movie Awards	14 April 2013	Best Musical Moment	Anne Hathaway	Nominated	
MTV Movie Awards	14 April 2013	Breakthrough Performance	Eddie Redmayne	Nominated	
National Board of Review	8 January 2013	Best Acting by an Ensemble	Les Misérables	Won	
National Board of Review	8 January 2013	Top Ten Films	Les Misérables	Won	
National Society of Film Critics	5 January 2013	Best Supporting Actress	Anne Hathaway	3rd place	
New York Film Critics Online	9 December 2012	Best Supporting Actress	Anne Hathaway	Won	
New York Film Critics Online	9 December 2012	Top Films of the Year	Les Misérables	Won	
Nikkan Sports Film Awards	28 December 2013	Best Foreign Film	Les Misérables	Won	
Online Film Critics Society	31 December 2012	Best Supporting Actress	Anne Hathaway	Won	
Palm Springs International Film Festival	5 January 2013	Sonny Bono Visionary Award	Tom Hooper	Won	
Producers Guild of America Awards	26 January 2013	Outstanding Producer of Theatrical Motion Pictures	Tim Bevan, Eric Fellner, Debra Hayward, and Cameron Mackintosh	Nominated	
San Diego Film Critics Society	11 December 2012	Best Actor	Hugh Jackman	Nominated	
San Diego Film Critics Society	11 December 2012	Best Cinematography	Danny Cohen	Nominated	
San Diego Film Critics Society	11 December 2012	Best Ensemble Performance	Les Misérables	Nominated	
San Diego Film Critics Society	11 December 2012	Best Production Design	Eve Stewart	Nominated	
San Diego Film Critics Society	11 December 2012	Best Supporting Actress	Samantha Barks	Nominated	
San Diego Film Critics Society	11 December 2012	Best Supporting Actress	Anne Hathaway	Nominated	
Santa Barbara International Film Festival	29 January 2013	Virtuosos Award	Eddie Redmayne	Won	
Satellite Awards	16 December 2012	Best Actor	Hugh Jackman	Nominated	
Satellite Awards	16 December 2012	Best Art Direction and Production Design	Eve Stewart and Anna Lynch-Robinson	Nominated	
Satellite Awards	16 December 2012	Best Costume Design	Paco Delgado	Nominated	
Satellite Awards	16 December 2012	Best Ensemble – Motion Picture	Les Misérables	Won	
Satellite Awards	16 December 2012	Best Film Editing	Chris Dickens and Melanie Oliver	Nominated	
Satellite Awards	16 December 2012	Best Motion Picture	Les Misérables	Nominated	
Satellite Awards	16 December 2012	Best Original Song	Hugh Jackman, Claude-Michel Schönberg, Herbert Kretzmer, and Alain Boublil (for "Suddenly")	Won	
Satellite Awards	16 December 2012	Best Sound (Editing and Mixing)	Andy Nelson, John Warhurst, Lee Walpole, and Simon Hayes	Won	
Satellite Awards	16 December 2012	Best Supporting Actor	Eddie Redmayne	Nominated	
Satellite Awards	16 December 2012	Best Supporting Actress	Samantha Barks	Nominated	
Satellite Awards	16 December 2012	Best Supporting Actress	Anne Hathaway	Won	
Satellite Awards	23 February 2014	Best Overall Blu-Ray	Les Misérables	Nominated	
Saturn Awards	26 June 2013	Best Action/Adventure Film	Les Misérables	Nominated	
Saturn Awards	26 June 2013	Best Actor	Hugh Jackman	Nominated	
Saturn Awards	26 June 2013	Best Costume Design	Paco Delgado	Won	
Saturn Awards	26 June 2013	Best Performance by a Younger Actor	Daniel Huttlestone	Nominated	
Saturn Awards	26 June 2013	Best Production Design	Eve Stewart	Nominated	
Saturn Awards	26 June 2013	Best Supporting Actress	Anne Hathaway	Nominated	
Screen Actors Guild Awards	27 January 2013	Outstanding Performance by a Cast in a Motion Picture	Isabelle Allen, Samantha Barks, Sacha Baron Cohen, Helena Bonham Carter, Russell Crowe, Anne Hathaway, Daniel Huttlestone, Hugh Jackman, Eddie Redmayne, Amanda Seyfried, Aaron Tveit, and Colm Wilkinson	Nominated	
Screen Actors Guild Awards	27 January 2013	Outstanding Performance by a Female Actor in a Supporting Role	Anne Hathaway	Won	
Screen Actors Guild Awards	27 January 2013	Outstanding Performance by a Male Actor in a Leading Role	Hugh Jackman	Nominated	
Screen Actors Guild Awards	27 January 2013	Outstanding Performance by a Stunt Ensemble in a Motion Picture	Les Misérables	Nominated	
St. Louis Film Critics Association	11 December 2012	Best Supporting Actress	Anne Hathaway	Nominated	
Teen Choice Awards	11 August 2013	Choice Movie Actor: Drama	Hugh Jackman	Nominated	
Teen Choice Awards	11 August 2013	Choice Movie Actor: Romance	Eddie Redmayne	Nominated	
Teen Choice Awards	11 August 2013	Choice Movie Actress: Romance	Amanda Seyfried	Nominated	
Teen Choice Awards	11 August 2013	Choice Movie Actress: Drama	Anne Hathaway	Nominated	
Teen Choice Awards	11 August 2013	Choice Movie: Breakout	Eddie Redmayne	Nominated	
Teen Choice Awards	11 August 2013	Choice Movie: Drama	Les Misérables	Nominated	
Teen Choice Awards	11 August 2013	Choice Movie: Romance	Les Misérables	Nominated	
Toronto Film Critics Association	8 January 2013	Best Supporting Actress	Anne Hathaway	Runner-up	
Turkish Film Critics Association	20 January 2014	Best Foreign Film	Les Misérables	15th place	
Vancouver Film Critics Circle	7 January 2013	Best Supporting Actress	Anne Hathaway	Nominated	
Washington D.C. Area Film Critics Association	10 December 2012	Best Actor	Hugh Jackman	Nominated	
Washington D.C. Area Film Critics Association	10 December 2012	Best Art Direction	Les Misérables	Nominated	
Washington D.C. Area Film Critics Association	10 December 2012	Best Cinematography	Danny Cohen	Nominated	
Washington D.C. Area Film Critics Association	10 December 2012	Best Ensemble	Les Misérables	Won	
Washington D.C. Area Film Critics Association	10 December 2012	Best Film	Les Misérables	Nominated	
Washington D.C. Area Film Critics Association	10 December 2012	Best Director	Tom Hooper	Nominated	
Washington D.C. Area Film Critics Association	10 December 2012	Best Supporting Actress	Samantha Barks	Nominated	
Washington D.C. Area Film Critics Association	10 December 2012	Best Supporting Actress	Anne Hathaway	Won	
Women Film Critics Circle	17 December 2012	Best Actress	Anne Hathaway	Won	
Women Film Critics Circle	17 December 2012	Mommie Dearest Worst Screen Mom of the Year Award	Helena Bonham Carter	Won	
Young Artist Awards	5 May 2013	Best Performance in a Feature Film – Supporting Young Actor	Daniel Huttlestone	Nominated	
Young Artist Awards	5 May 2013	Best Performance in a Feature Film – Supporting Young Actress Ten and Under	Isabelle Allen	Won	
