= List of number-one albums of 2013 (Ireland) =

The Irish Albums Chart ranks the best-performing albums in Ireland, as compiled by Chart-Track on behalf of the Irish Recorded Music Association. The chart week runs from Friday to Thursday.

Issue date	Album	Artist	Reference
3 January	+	Ed Sheeran	
10 January	+	Ed Sheeran	
17 January	Awayland	Villagers	
24 January	Les Misérables	Original Motion Picture Cast	
31 January	Les Misérables	Original Motion Picture Cast	
7 February	Our Version of Events	Emeli Sandé	
14 February	Our Version of Events	Emeli Sandé	
21 February	Our Version of Events	Emeli Sandé	
28 February	Our Version of Events	Emeli Sandé	
7 March	Our Version of Events	Emeli Sandé	
14 March	The Next Day	David Bowie	
21 March	The 20/20 Experience	Justin Timberlake	
28 March	The 20/20 Experience	Justin Timberlake	
4 April	Rage and Romance	Bressie	
11 April	Paramore	Paramore	
18 April	To Be Loved	Michael Bublé	
25 April	To Be Loved	Michael Bublé	
2 May	To Be Loved	Michael Bublé	
9 May	To Be Loved	Michael Bublé	
16 May	Absolute Zero	Little Green Cars	
23 May	Random Access Memories	Daft Punk	
30 May	Random Access Memories	Daft Punk	
6 June	...Like Clockwork	Queens of the Stone Age	
13 June	Random Access Memories	Daft Punk	
20 June	In a Perfect World	Kodaline	
27 June	In a Perfect World	Kodaline	
4 July	Chop Chop	Bell X1	
11 July	In a Perfect World	Kodaline	
18 July	To Be Loved	Michael Bublé	
25 July	To Be Loved	Michael Bublé	
1 August	In a Perfect World	Kodaline	
8 August	In a Perfect World	Kodaline	
15 August	In a Perfect World	Kodaline	
22 August	Where I Wanna Be	Nathan Carter	
29 August	Hail to the King	Avenged Sevenfold	
5 September	In a Perfect World	Kodaline	
12 September	AM	Arctic Monkeys	
19 September	AM	Arctic Monkeys	
26 September	Mechanical Bull	Kings of Leon	
3 October	Mechanical Bull	Kings of Leon	
10 October	Bangerz	Miley Cyrus	
17 October	Lightning Bolt	Pearl Jam	
24 October	Prism	Katy Perry	
31 October	Reflektor	Arcade Fire	
7 November	The Marshall Mathers LP 2	Eminem	
14 November	The Marshall Mathers LP 2	Eminem	
21 November	The Marshall Mathers LP 2	Eminem	
28 November	Midnight Memories	One Direction	
5 December	Midnight Memories	One Direction	
12 December	Midnight Memories	One Direction	
19 December	Midnight Memories	One Direction	
26 December	Midnight Memories	One Direction	

== See also ==
- List of number-one singles of 2013 (Ireland)
