= List of number-one singles of 2013 (Ireland) =

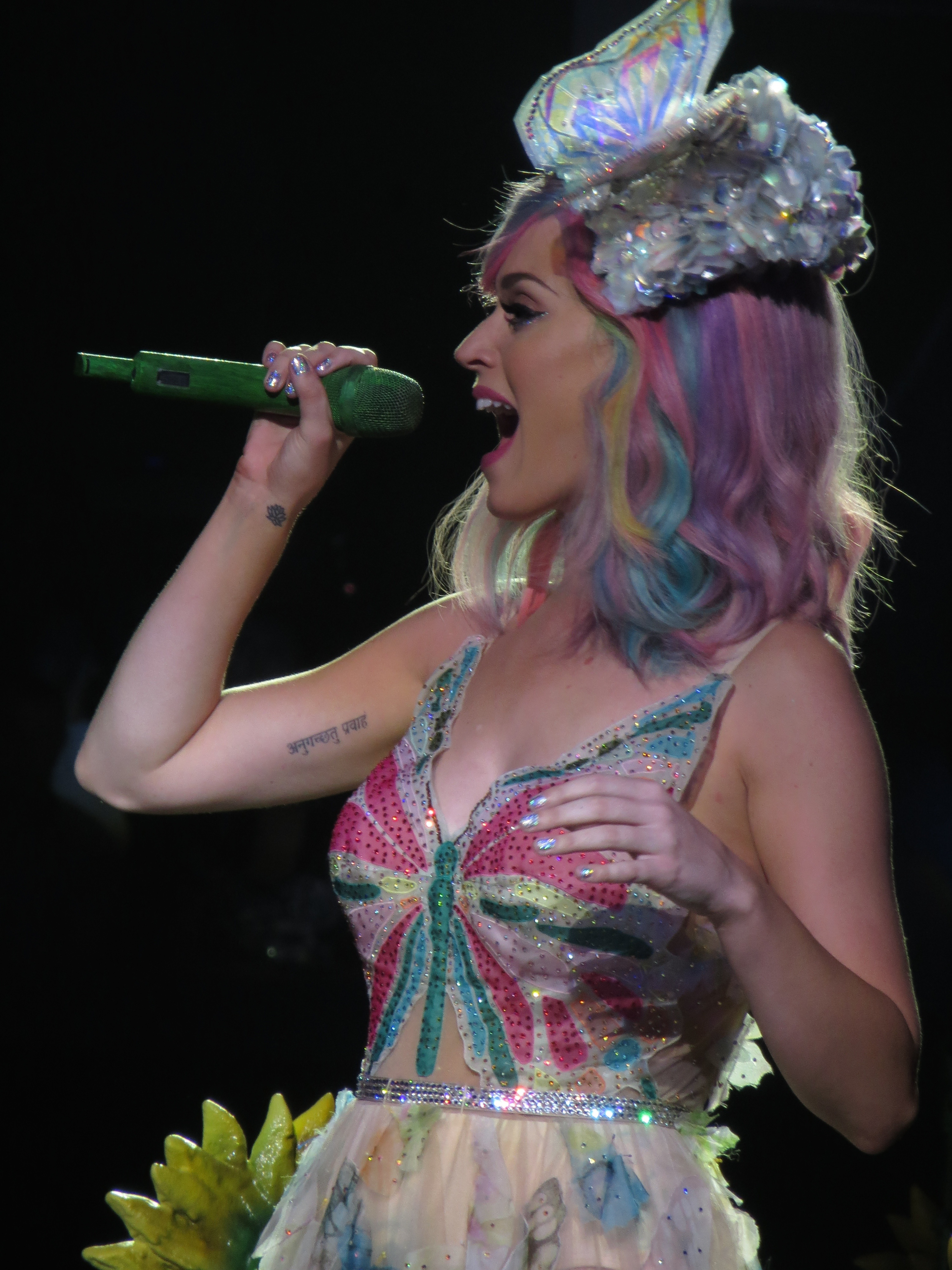
Katy Perry hit number one with Roar which spent six weeks at number one.

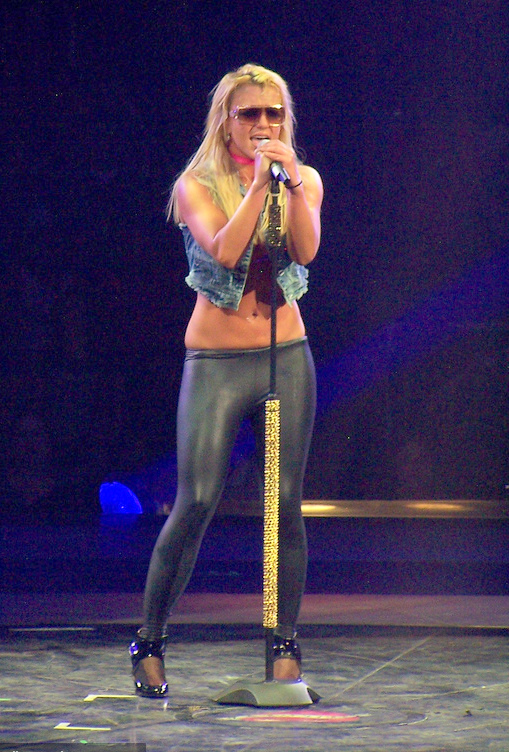
Pop star Britney Spears gained her first number one in five years with Scream & Shout, a collaboration with Will.i.am.

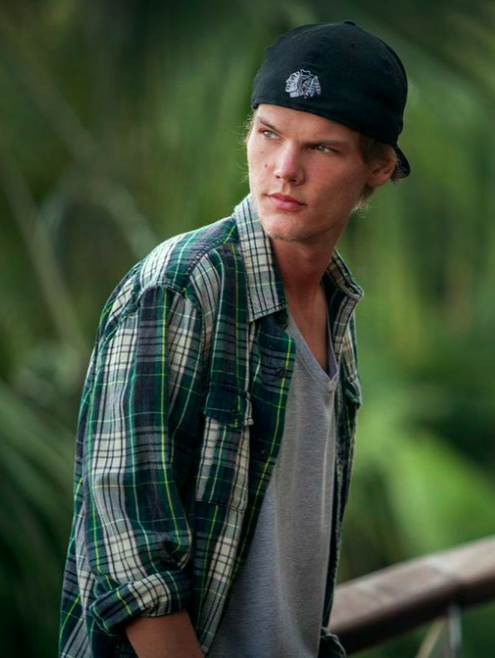
Swedish DJ Avicii spent seven weeks at number one with his debut single Wake Me Up.

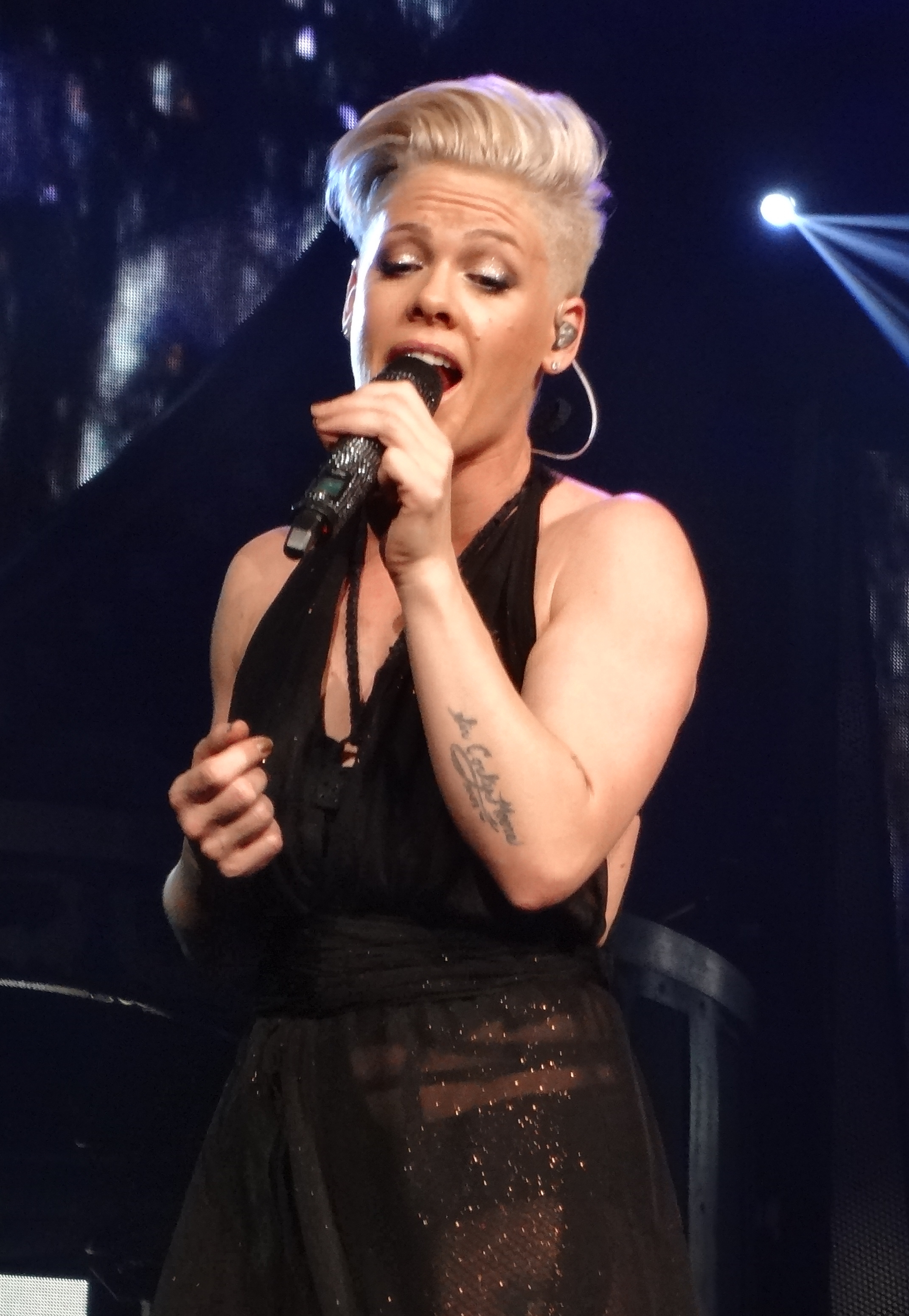
Pink earned her fourth number one hit when Just Give Me a Reason hit number one.

The Irish Singles Chart ranks the best-performing singles in Ireland, as compiled by Chart-Track on behalf of the Irish Recorded Music Association. The chart week runs from Friday to Thursday.

Issue date	Song	Artist	Reference
3 January	"Impossible"	James Arthur	
10 January	"Impossible"	James Arthur	
17 January	"Scream & Shout"	will.i.am and Britney Spears	
24 January	"Scream & Shout"	will.i.am and Britney Spears	
31 January	"Scream & Shout"	will.i.am and Britney Spears	
7 February	"Scream & Shout"	will.i.am and Britney Spears	
14 February	"Thrift Shop"	Macklemore and Ryan Lewis featuring Wanz	
21 February	"One Way or Another (Teenage Kicks)"	One Direction	
28 February	"Let Her Go"	Passenger	
7 March	"Let Her Go"	Passenger	
14 March	"Let Her Go"	Passenger	
21 March	"High Hopes"	Kodaline	
28 March	"High Hopes"	Kodaline	
4 April	"Just Give Me a Reason"	Pink featuring Nate Ruess	
11 April	"Pompeii"	Bastille	
18 April	"Pompeii"	Bastille	
25 April	"Get Lucky"	Daft Punk featuring Pharrell Williams and Nile Rodgers	
2 May	"Get Lucky"	Daft Punk featuring Pharrell Williams and Nile Rodgers	
9 May	"Get Lucky"	Daft Punk featuring Pharrell Williams and Nile Rodgers	
16 May	"Blurred Lines"	Robin Thicke featuring T.I. and Pharrell	
23 May	"Blurred Lines"	Robin Thicke featuring T.I. and Pharrell	
30 May	"Blurred Lines"	Robin Thicke featuring T.I. and Pharrell	
6 June	"Blurred Lines"	Robin Thicke featuring T.I. and Pharrell	
13 June	"Blurred Lines"	Robin Thicke featuring T.I. and Pharrell	
20 June	"Blurred Lines"	Robin Thicke featuring T.I. and Pharrell	
27 June	"Blurred Lines"	Robin Thicke featuring T.I. and Pharrell	
4 July	"Wake Me Up"	Avicii	
11 July	"Wake Me Up"	Avicii	
18 July	"Wake Me Up"	Avicii	
25 July	"Wake Me Up"	Avicii	
1 August	"Wake Me Up"	Avicii	
8 August	"Wake Me Up"	Avicii	
15 August	"Wake Me Up"	Avicii	
22 August	"Roar"	Katy Perry	
29 August	"The Last Great Love Song"	Finbar Furey	
5 September	"Roar"	Katy Perry	
12 September	"Roar"	Katy Perry	
19 September	"Roar"	Katy Perry	
26 September	"Roar"	Katy Perry	
3 October	"Roar"	Katy Perry	
10 October	"Royals"	Lorde	
17 October	"Wings"	Birdy	
24 October	"Royals"	Lorde	
31 October	"Story of My Life"	One Direction	
7 November	"The Monster"	Eminem featuring Rihanna	
14 November	"The Monster"	Eminem featuring Rihanna	
21 November	"Somewhere Only We Know"	Lily Allen	
28 November	"Somewhere Only We Know"	Lily Allen	
5 December	"Somewhere Only We Know"	Lily Allen	
12 December	"Somewhere Only We Know"	Lily Allen	
19 December	"Skyscraper"	Sam Bailey	
26 December	"Skyscraper"	Sam Bailey	

== Number-one artists ==
Position	Artist	Weeks at No. 1
1	Pharrell Williams	10
2	Robin Thicke	7
2	T.I.	7
2	Avicii	7
5	Katy Perry	6
6	will.i.am	4
6	Britney Spears	4
6	Lily Allen	4
9	Passenger	3
9	Daft Punk	3
11	James Arthur	2
11	One Direction	2
11	Kodaline	2
11	Bastille	2
11	Lorde	2
11	Eminem	2
11	Rihanna	2
11	Sam Bailey	2
19	Macklemore and Ryan Lewis	1
19	Wanz	1
19	Pink	1
19	Nate Ruess	1
19	Finbar Furey	1
19	Birdy	1

== See also ==
- List of number-one albums of 2013 (Ireland)
