= Les Misérables: Highlights from the Motion Picture Soundtrack =

Soundtrack album by various artists
- Released: December 21, 2012
- Genre: Film soundtrack
- Length: 65:20
- Label: Universal Republic

Professional ratings
Review scores
Source	Rating
Allmusic	3/5 stars
Rolling Stone	1/5 stars

Les Misérables: Highlights from the Motion Picture Soundtrack is the film soundtrack for the 2012 Universal Pictures film Les Misérables, performed by Hugh Jackman, Russell Crowe, Anne Hathaway, Amanda Seyfried, Eddie Redmayne, Samantha Barks, Aaron Tveit, Helena Bonham Carter, Sacha Baron Cohen and other artists. It was released on December 21, 2012. The music is written by Claude-Michel Schönberg; the lyrics by Herbert Kretzmer based on the French text by Alain Boublil and Jean-Marc Natel.

== Production ==
In an interview with BBC Radio 4's Front Row, Tom Hooper the film's director, revealed that Claude-Michel Schönberg would be composing one new song and additional music. In February 2012, Cameron Mackintosh revealed a newly created song, "Suddenly", that "explains what happens when Valjean takes Cosette from the inn and looks after her."

The film's vocals were recorded live on set using live piano accompaniments played through earpieces as a guide, with the orchestral accompaniment recorded in post-production, rather than actors lip-syncing to a pre-recorded musical soundtrack. Tom Hooper explained that this would eliminate the need to recapture "locked" performances and allow more creative freedom. Despite the film's creative team claiming this live recording method "a world's-first", several film musicals have utilized this method before, including the At Long Last Love (1975), The Fantasticks (1995) and Across the Universe (2007). On 9 September 2012, Universal Studios executives were granted a viewing of the rough cut of the film without the orchestra. The cut was greeted with "extreme excitement", and Russell Crowe tweeted that he received many excited emails. Orchestral recording sessions for Les Misérables began in London on 10 October 2012 with a 70-piece orchestra.

== Content ==
The Highlights album doesn't contain all musical numbers in the film, with traditional show highlights such as "Who am I?" and "A Little Fall of Rain" being omitted. The famous anthem "Do You Hear the People Sing?" does not appear on the album except for its reprise in the "Epilogue". Songs included on the album are often also incomplete in comparison with the movie itself (for example, At the End of the Day on the album is missing Fantine's explanation.)

A 2-Disc Deluxe Edition, released on March 19, 2013, comprised 42 tracks, including several of songs omitted on the highlights album as well as a few instrumental pieces. However, like the highlights album, many of the songs are still cut short due to time.

== Commercial performance ==
Upon its release, Les Misérables debuted at number thirty-three on the Billboard 200 and at number one on the Billboard Soundtracks chart, selling 43,000 copies in less than three full days of release, according to Nielsen SoundScan. The following week, it sold 136,000 copies to jump to number two on the Billboard 200. The soundtrack topped the Billboard 200 in its third week on the chart, selling 92,000 copies. The total of 178,000 copies sold from the ten days of sales made it the tenth best-selling soundtrack album of 2012. It sold a further 512,000 copies in the United States in 2013, making it the third best-selling soundtrack of 2013. As of January 2014, it had sold a total of 690,000 copies in the US.

The album entered the UK Albums Chart at number five with first-week sales of 13,844 copies, before rising to number one the following week on sales of 55,954 copies. The album spent four non-consecutive weeks atop the chart.

In Japan, the album reached number eleven on the Japanese Albums Chart, and was certified gold by the Recording Industry Association of Japan (RIAJ) in March 2013, denoting shipments of 100,000 copies.

== Track listing ==
All lyrics are written by Alain Boublil, Herbert Kretzmer, and Jean-Marc Natel; all music is composed by Claude-Michel Schönberg.

No.	Title	Artist(s)	Length
1.	"Look Down"	Hugh Jackman, Russell Crowe and Convicts	2:21
2.	"The Bishop"	Colm Wilkinson	1:34
3.	"Valjean's Soliloquy"	Hugh Jackman	3:18
4.	"At the End of the Day"	Hugh Jackman, Anne Hathaway, Foreman, Factory Girls and Cast of Les Misérables	4:27
5.	"I Dreamed a Dream"	Anne Hathaway	4:38
6.	"The Confrontation"	Hugh Jackman and Russell Crowe	1:55
7.	"Castle on a Cloud"	Isabelle Allen	1:11
8.	"Master of the House"	Sacha Baron Cohen, Helena Bonham Carter and Cast	4:52
9.	"Suddenly"	Hugh Jackman	2:32
10.	"Stars"	Russell Crowe	3:01
11.	"ABC Café / Red and Black"	Eddie Redmayne, Aaron Tveit and Students	4:21
12.	"In My Life / A Heart Full of Love"	Amanda Seyfried, Eddie Redmayne and Samantha Barks	3:12
13.	"On My Own"	Samantha Barks	3:11
14.	"One Day More"	Cast of Les Misérables	3:39
15.	"Drink with Me"	Eddie Redmayne, Daniel Huttlestone and Students	1:41
16.	"Bring Him Home"	Hugh Jackman	3:37
17.	"The Final Battle"	Students and Cast of Les Misérables	3:17
18.	"Javert's Suicide"	Russell Crowe	3:00
19.	"Empty Chairs at Empty Tables"	Eddie Redmayne	3:13
20.	"Epilogue"	Cast of Les Misérables	6:20

== Charts ==
=== Weekly charts ===
Chart (2012–13)	Peak position
Argentine Albums (CAPIF)	15
Australian Albums (ARIA)	2
Austrian Albums (Ö3 Austria)	3
Belgian Albums (Ultratop Flanders)	21
Belgian Albums (Ultratop Wallonia)	51
Canadian Albums (Billboard)	3
Czech Albums (ČNS IFPI)	4
Danish Albums (Hitlisten)	16
Dutch Albums (Album Top 100)	14
Finnish Albums (Suomen virallinen lista)	18
French Albums (SNEP)	81
German Albums (Offizielle Top 100)	18
Greek Albums (IFPI)	11
Hungarian Albums (MAHASZ)	11
Irish Albums (IRMA)	1
Italian Compilation Albums (FIMI)	7
Japanese Albums (Oricon)	11
Mexican Albums (Top 100 Mexico)	3
New Zealand Albums (RMNZ)	1
Norwegian Albums (VG-lista)	7
Polish Albums (ZPAV)	3
Scottish Albums (Official Charts)	1
Slovenian Albums (Slo Top 30)	30
South Korean Albums (Gaon)	1
Swedish Albums (Sverigetopplistan)	3
Swiss Albums (Schweizer Hitparade)	35
UK Albums (Official Charts)	1
US Billboard 200	1
US Soundtrack Albums (Billboard)	1

=== Year-end charts ===
Chart (2012)	Position
South Korean International Albums (Gaon)	3

Chart (2013)	Position
Australian Albums (ARIA)	49
Belgian Albums (Ultratop Flanders)	173
Hungarian Albums (MAHASZ)	97
Irish Albums (IRMA)	20
Japanese Albums (Oricon)	55
New Zealand Albums (RMNZ)	27
South Korean Albums (Gaon)	67
South Korean International Albums (Gaon)	5
UK Albums (OCC)	12
US Billboard 200	30
US Soundtrack Albums (Billboard)	2

=== Decade-end charts ===
Chart (2010–2019)	Position
US Billboard 200	163

=== Singles ===
Title	Peak positions	
Title	UK	US
"I Dreamed a Dream"	22	69
"On My Own"	43	97
"One Day More"	66	110

== Certifications ==
Region	Certification	Certified units/sales
Australia (ARIA)	Gold	35,000^{^}
Japan (RIAJ)	Gold	113,926
New Zealand (RMNZ)	Gold	7,500^{^}
United States (RIAA)	Gold	723,388
^{^} Shipments figures based on certification alone.

== See also ==
- Les Misérables, the 1862 novel by Victor Hugo
- List of UK Albums Chart number ones of the 2010s
- List of number-one albums of 2012 (South Korea)
- List of number-one albums of 2013 (Ireland)
- List of number-one albums of 2013 (U.S.)
- Adaptations of Les Misérables
