= Les Misérables (2012 film) =

Epic period musical film

- Theatrical release poster
- Directed by: Tom Hooper
- Screenplay by: William Nicholson; Alain Boublil; Claude-Michel Schönberg; Herbert Kretzmer
- Based on: Les Misérables by; Claude-Michel Schönberg; Alain Boublil; Jean-Marc Natel; Les Misérables by Victor Hugo
- Produced by: Tim Bevan; Eric Fellner; Debra Hayward; Cameron Mackintosh
- Starring: Hugh Jackman; Russell Crowe; Anne Hathaway; Amanda Seyfried; Eddie Redmayne; Helena Bonham Carter; Sacha Baron Cohen
- Cinematography: Danny Cohen
- Edited by: Melanie Oliver; Chris Dickens
- Music by: Claude-Michel Schönberg
- Production companies: Relativity Media; Working Title Films; Camack International
- Distributed by: Universal Pictures
- Release dates: 5 December 2012 (Odeon Luxe Leicester Square); 25 December 2012 (United States); 11 January 2013 (United Kingdom)
- Running time: 157 minutes
- Countries: United Kingdom; United States
- Language: English
- Budget: $61 million
- Box office: $442.8 million

Les Misérables is a 2012 musical film directed by Tom Hooper from a screenplay by William Nicholson, Alain Boublil, Claude-Michel Schönberg and Herbert Kretzmer. It is based on the stage musical of the same name by Schönberg, Boublil and Jean-Marc Natel, which in turn is based on the 1862 novel Les Misérables by Victor Hugo. The film stars Hugh Jackman, Russell Crowe, Anne Hathaway, Eddie Redmayne, Amanda Seyfried, Helena Bonham Carter and Sacha Baron Cohen, with Samantha Barks, Aaron Tveit and Daniel Huttlestone in supporting roles. Set in France during the early nineteenth century, the film tells the story of Jean Valjean who, while being hunted for decades by the ruthless policeman Javert after breaking parole, agrees to care for a factory worker's daughter. The story reaches resolution against the background of the June Rebellion of 1832.

Following the release of the stage musical, a film adaptation was mired in development hell for over ten years, as the rights were passed on to several major studios, and various directors and actors considered. In 2011, the stage musical's producer Cameron Mackintosh sold the film rights to Eric Fellner, who financed the film with Tim Bevan and Debra Hayward through their production company Working Title Films. In June 2011, production of the film officially began, with Hooper hired as director. The main characters were cast later that year. Principal photography began in March 2012 and ended in June. Filming took place on locations in Greenwich, London, Chatham, Winchester, Bath, and Portsmouth, England; in Gourdon, France; and on soundstages in Pinewood Studios.

Les Misérables premiered at the Odeon Luxe Leicester Square in London on 5 December 2012, and was released by Universal Pictures on 25 December in the United States and on 11 January 2013 in the United Kingdom. The film received generally positive reviews from critics, with many praising the direction, production values, musical numbers, and the performances of the cast, with Jackman, Hathaway, Redmayne, Seyfried, Tveit, and Barks being the most often singled out for praise. However, Crowe's singing and performance as Javert was criticised. It grossed $442.8 million worldwide against a production budget of $61 million during its original theatrical run. The film was nominated for eight categories at the 85th Academy Awards (including Best Picture), winning in three (including Best Supporting Actress for Hathaway), and received numerous other accolades. The National Board of Review and the American Film Institute named Les Misérables one of the top-ten films of 2012. Since its release, it has been considered to be one of the best musical films of the 21st century. (Note: Attributed to multiple references:)

A new digitally remixed and remastered version of the film was released theatrically in Dolby Cinema on 14 February 2024 in the United Kingdom and on 23 February 2024 in the United States to commemorate the stage musical's 40th anniversary in 2025.

== Plot ==
In 1815, French prisoner Jean Valjean is released from the Bagne of Toulon after a nineteen-year sentence for stealing bread and attempting to escape the sentence. His paroled status prevents him from finding work or accommodation, but he is sheltered by the kindly Bishop of Digne. Valjean attempts to steal his silverware and is captured, but the bishop claims he gave him the silver and tells him to use it to begin an honest life. Moved, Valjean breaks his parole and assumes a new identity, intending to redeem others.

Eight years later, Valjean is a respected factory owner and mayor of Montreuil, Pas-de-Calais. He is startled when Javert, formerly a Toulon prison guard, arrives as his new chief of police. Witnessing Valjean rescue a worker trapped under a cart makes Javert suspect the former's true identity. Meanwhile, one of Valjean's workers, Fantine, is fired by the foreman when she is revealed to have an illegitimate daughter, Cosette, residing with the greedy Thénardiers, to whom Fantine sends her earnings.

Out on the streets and increasingly ill, Fantine sells her hair, teeth and eventually her body to support Cosette. Javert arrests her after she physically attacks a sexually abusive client, but Valjean recognises her and takes her to the hospital, much to Javert's suspicion and anger. Learning that a man has been wrongly identified as him, Valjean reveals his identity to the court before returning to the dying Fantine, promising to care for Cosette. Javert arrives to arrest him but he escapes to the Thénardiers' inn. Valjean pays Fantine's debts, then flees from Javert with Cosette.

Nine years later, Valjean has become a philanthropist to the poor in Paris. General Lamarque, the only government official sympathetic to the poor, dies, and the revolutionist group Friends of the ABC plot against the monarchy. Marius Pontmercy, a member of the Friends, falls in love with Cosette at first sight and asks his best friend Éponine, the Thénardiers' daughter, to find her. He and Cosette meet and confess their love; Éponine, herself in love with Marius, is heartbroken.

Thénardier attempts to rob Valjean's house, but Éponine stops him. Fearing Javert is near, Valjean plans to flee to England with Cosette. Cosette, wanting to stay near Marius, is hesitant about the idea, but when Valjean ignores her pleas, she leaves Marius a letter, which Éponine hides from him. During Lamarque's funeral procession, the revolt begins and barricades are built across Paris. Javert poses as an ally to spy on the rebels, but the street urchin Gavroche exposes him as a policeman. During the first skirmish against the soldiers, Éponine takes a bullet for Marius and dies in his arms, giving him Cosette's letter and confessing her love, leaving Marius devastated and heartbroken over the death of his best friend. Marius's answer to Cosette is intercepted by Valjean, who joins the revolt to protect him. Valjean offers to execute the imprisoned Javert, but releases him instead, pretending he shot him.

By dawn, the soldiers storm the barricade and kill everyone except Marius and Valjean, who escape into the sewers. Javert waits for him to exit, but seeing that Marius is close to death, he lets them go. Morally disturbed by the mercy of his nemesis and his own in return, Javert kills himself by throwing himself in the Seine. Marius recovers, traumatized by the death of his friends, especially Éponine.

Marius and Cosette are reunited, but Valjean, concerned his past would threaten their happiness, makes plans to leave. He reveals his past to Marius, who promises to remain silent. At Marius and Cosette's wedding, the Thénardiers crash the reception to blackmail him; but instead, realizing that Valjean saved him from the barricade, Marius forces Thénardier to reveal where he is. Cosette and Marius find Valjean, who gives them letters of confession before dying peacefully. His spirit is guided by visions of Fantine and the Bishop to join Éponine, Gavroche, and the Friends of the ABC in the afterlife.

== Cast ==
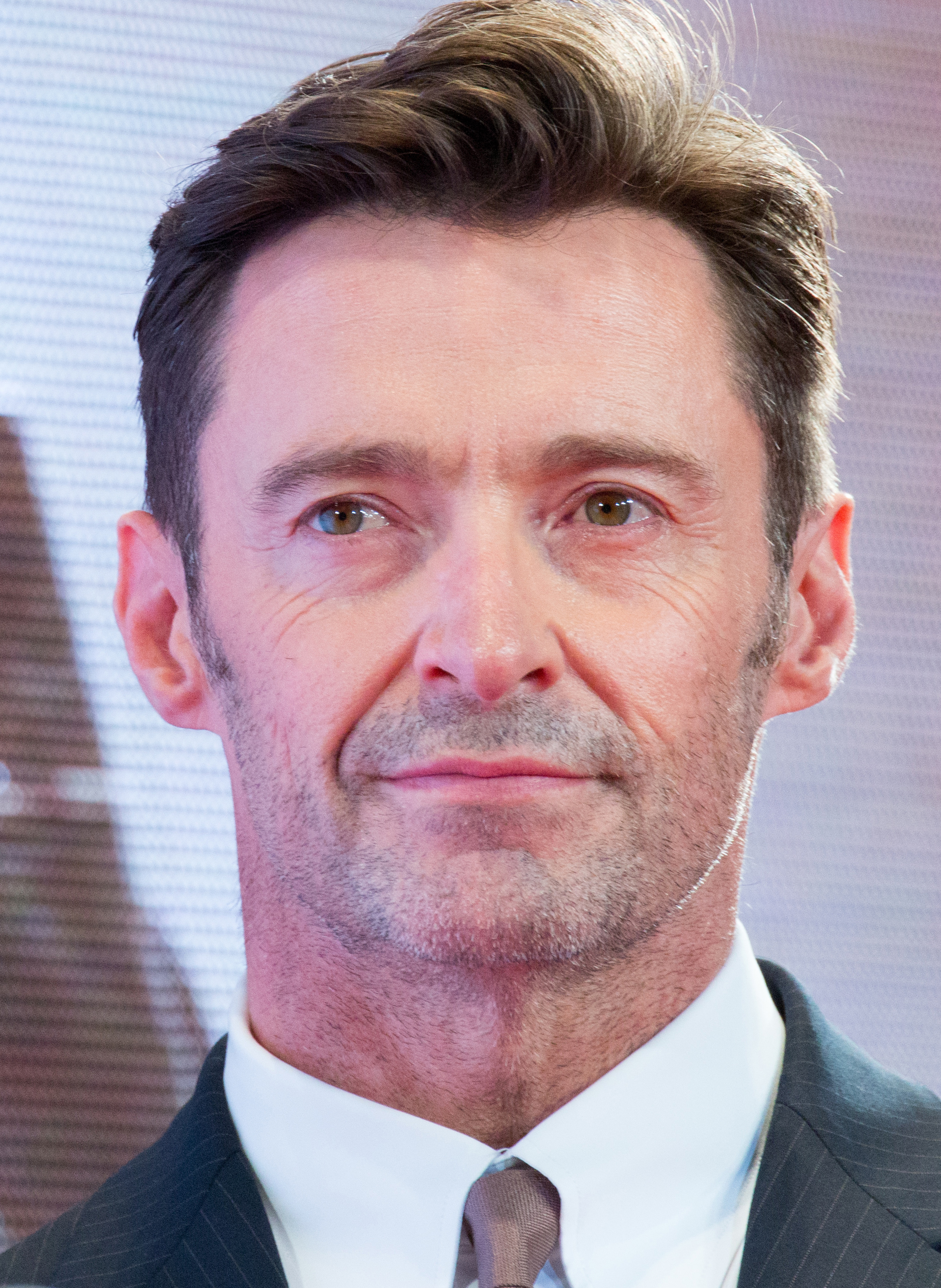
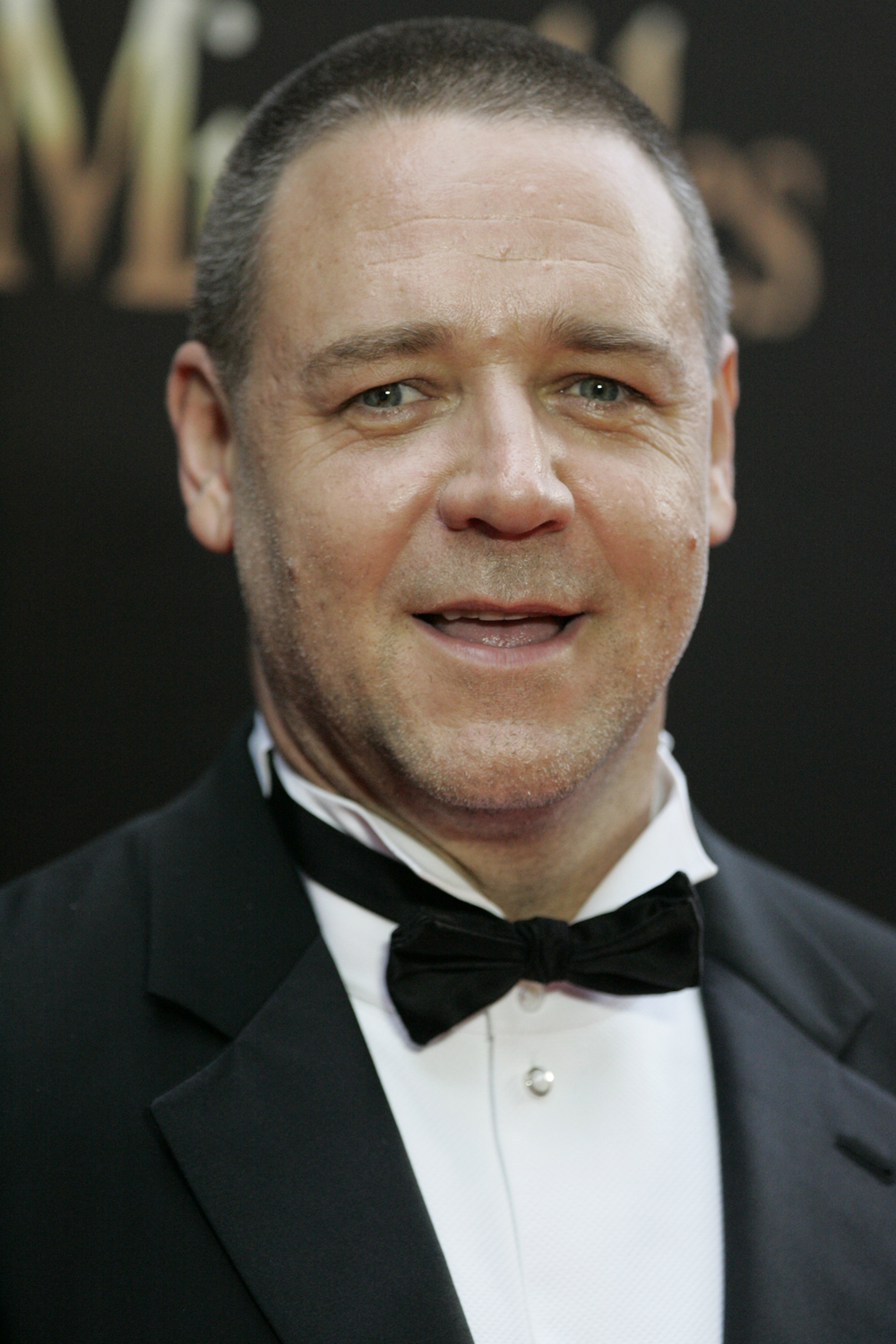
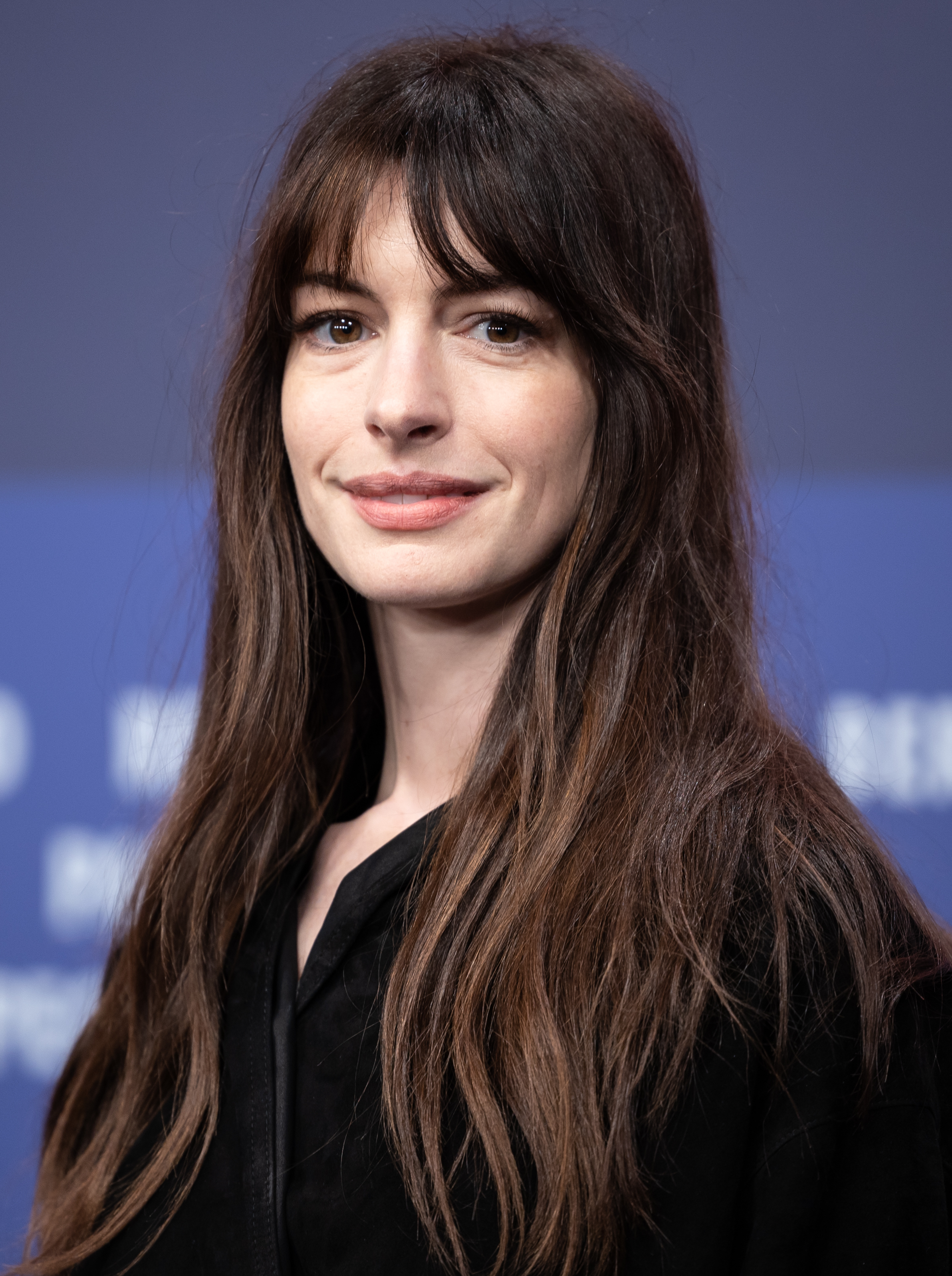
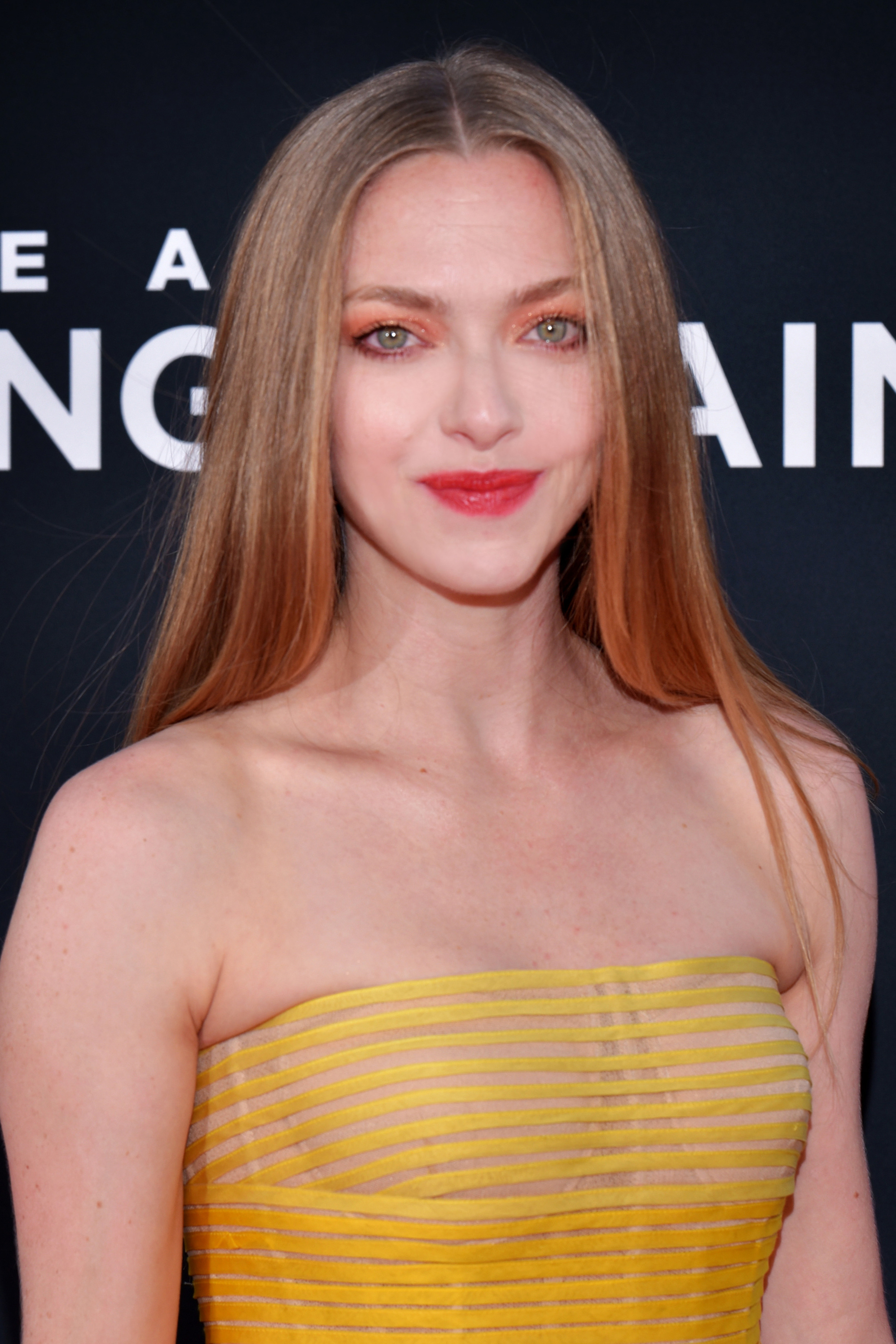
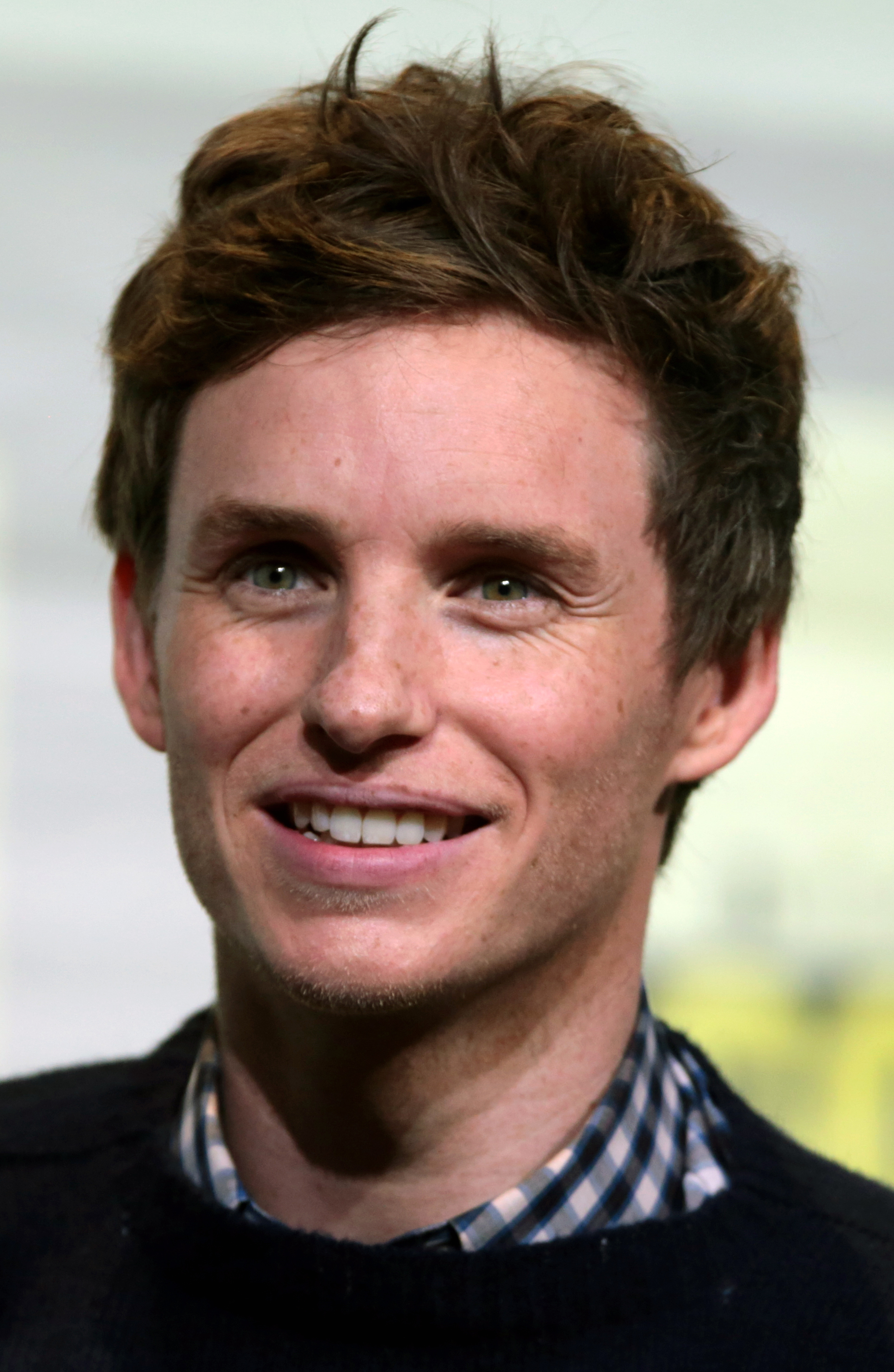
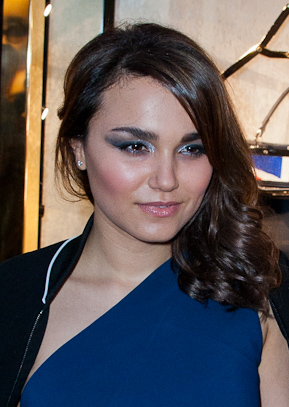
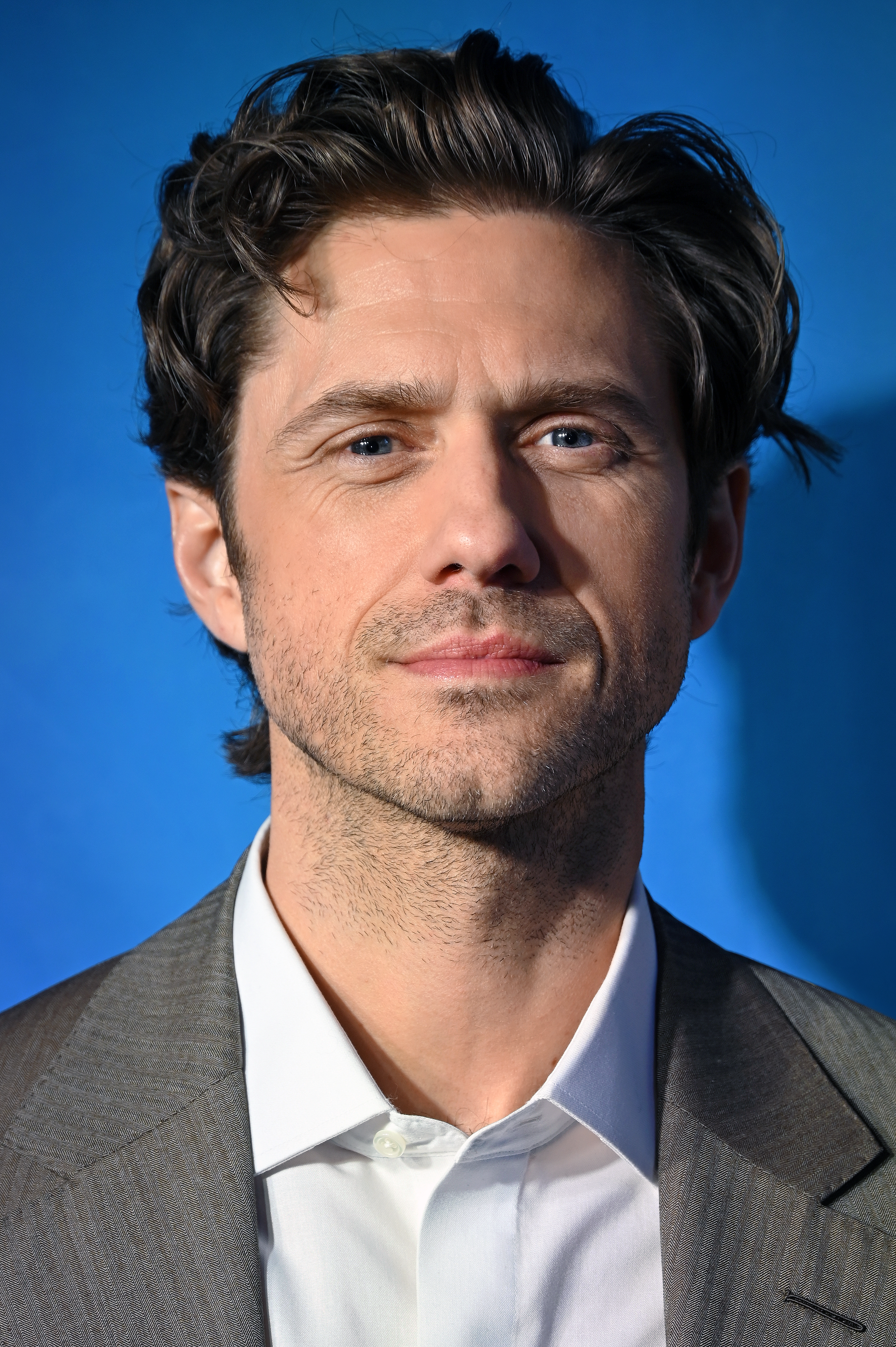
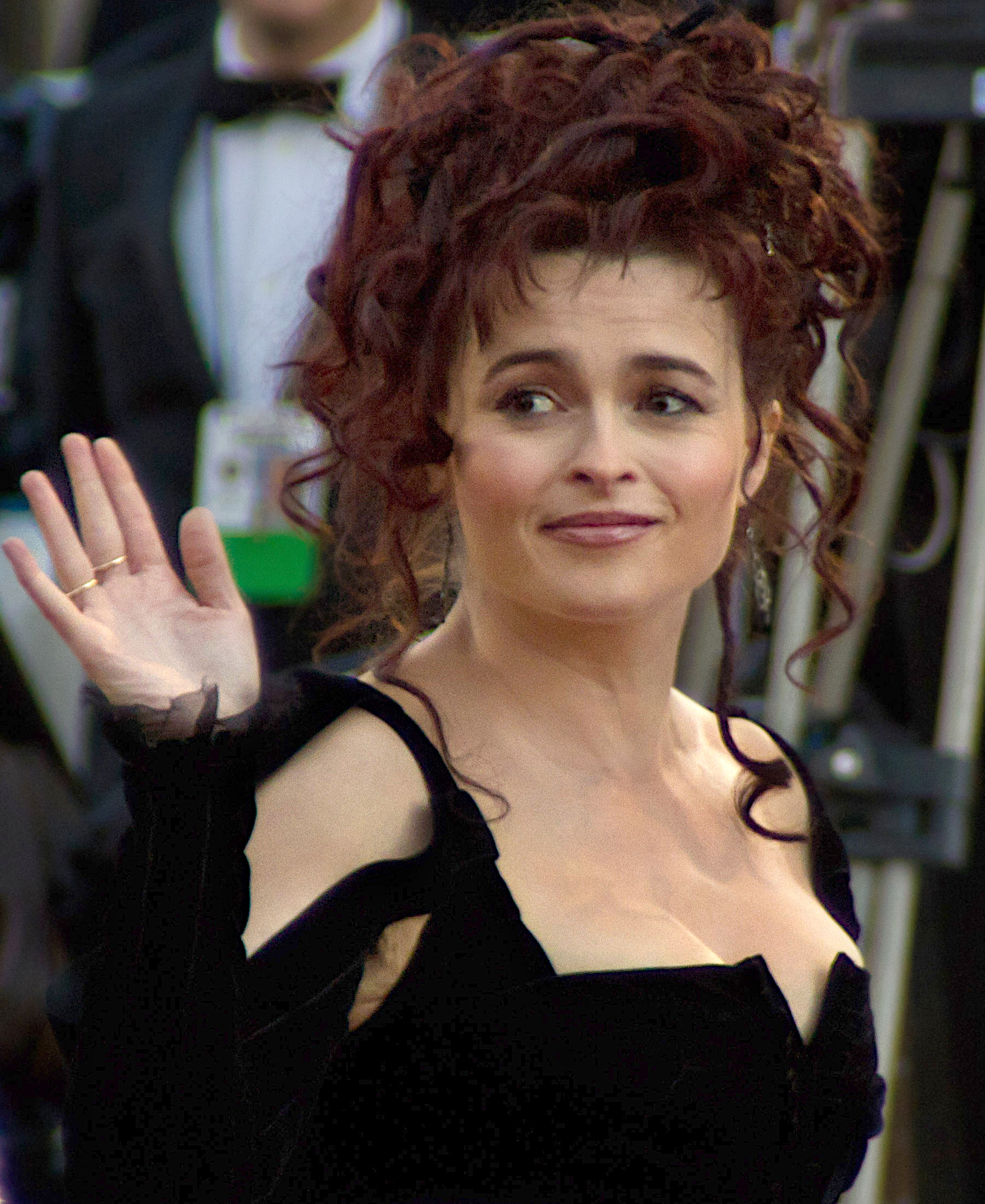
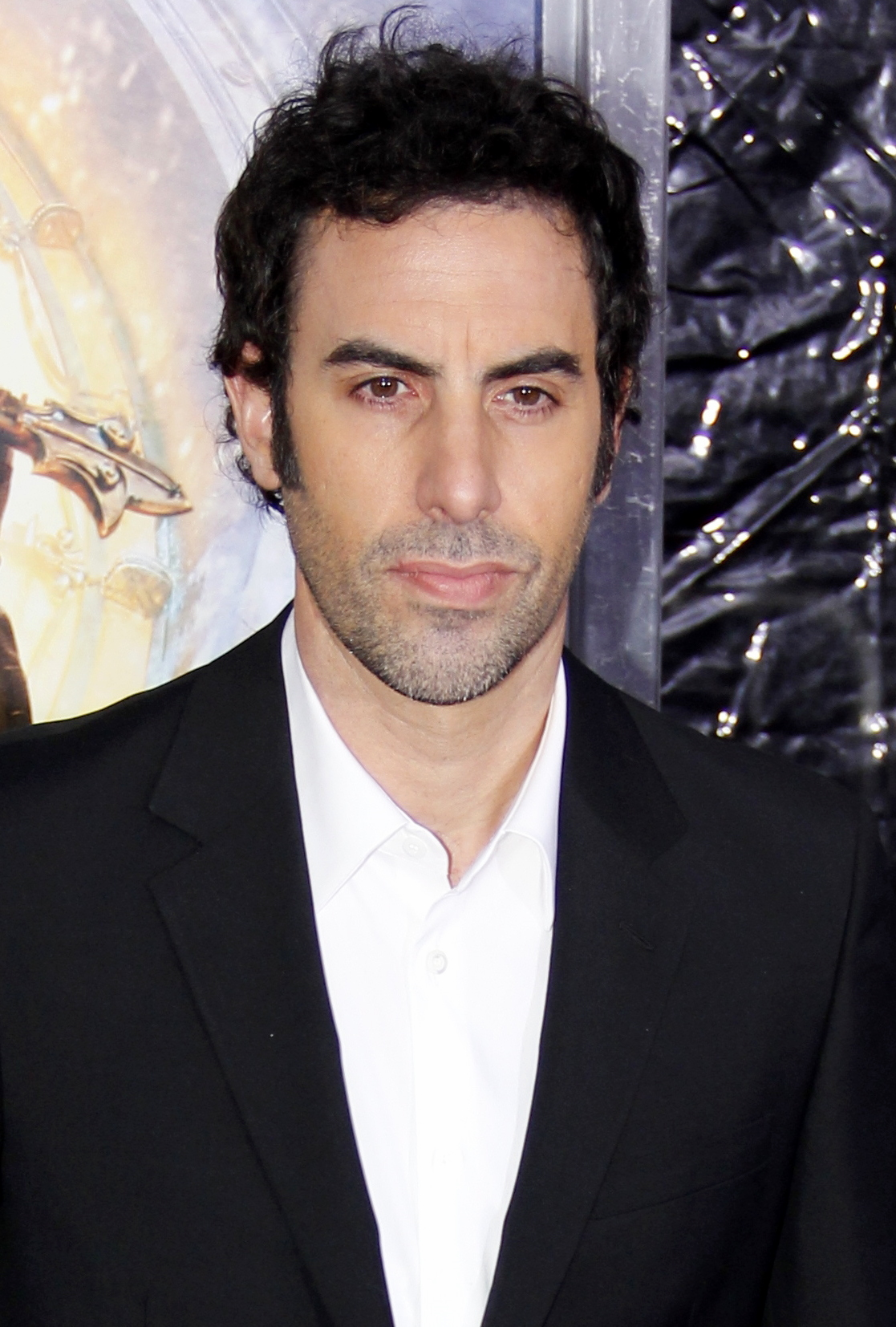
- Top row: (left to right) Hugh Jackman, Russell Crowe, Anne Hathaway, and Amanda Seyfried
- Bottom row: (left to right) Eddie Redmayne, Samantha Barks, Aaron Tveit, Helena Bonham Carter, and Sacha Baron Cohen
- Hugh Jackman as Jean Valjean, a Frenchman released from Toulon prison after 19 years of imprisonment for stealing bread and attempting to escape the prison. Around June 2011, Jackman met with producer Cameron Mackintosh to audition in New York. To prepare for the role, Jackman lost 15 pounds (6.8 kg) and later regained 30 pounds (14 kg) to mirror his character's success. He avoided drinking coffee, warmed up at least 15 minutes every day, kept Ricola lozenges, drank as much as seven litres of water per day, sat in steam three times a day, took cold baths and used a wet washcloth over his face while flying, citing the musical's original co-director Trevor Nunn for his training. He worked extensively with vocal coach Joan Lader, and managed to extend his vocal range, which he originally categorised a high baritone, up to tenor.
- Russell Crowe as Javert, a police inspector dedicating his life to imprisoning Valjean once again. Before being cast as Javert, Crowe was initially dissatisfied with the character. On his way to Europe for a friend's wedding, Crowe came to London and met with producer Cameron Mackintosh. On meeting with Tom Hooper, he told the director about his concerns about playing Javert, and after meeting with him, Crowe was "determined to be involved in the project and play Javert. I think it had something to do with Tom's passion for what he was about to undertake, and he clearly understood the problems and he clearly understood the challenge." On visiting Victor Hugo's home in Paris, Crowe said, "[The house's curator] told me about [19th century detective Eugene Francois] Vidocq, a man who had been both a prisoner and a policeman, the man credited with inventing undercover police work when he established the Brigade de Surete."
- Anne Hathaway as Fantine, the mother of Cosette and a struggling factory worker, who resorts to prostitution after losing her job and being forced to sell her hair and teeth. When Hathaway was cast, she stated, "There was resistance because I was between their ideal ages for the parts—maybe not mature enough for Fantine but past the point where I could believably play Cosette." Hathaway chose to have her real hair cut off on camera for the scenes where Fantine becomes a prostitute.
- Amanda Seyfried as Cosette, the illegitimate daughter of Fantine, who is kept by the Thénardiers until Valjean buys her from them. On developing Cosette, Seyfried said, "In the little time that I had to explain Cosette and give the audience a reason [to see her as] a symbol of love and strength and light in this tragedy, I needed to be able to convey things you may not have connected with in the show." A vocal coach was enlisted to help her with the songs. Isabelle Allen plays Cosette as a child. On working with her fellow actors, Allen said, "They gave us lots of tips and mostly [made] sure we were all OK. They were really nice."
- Eddie Redmayne as Marius Pontmercy, a student revolutionary who is friends with the Thenardiers' daughter, Éponine, but falls in love with Cosette. He found director Hooper's vision "incredibly helpful". On collaborating with Hooper, Redmayne said, "He was incredibly collaborative. Certainly during the rehearsal process, we sat with Tom and the Victor Hugo book adding things." It was Redmayne who suggested to Hooper that his character's song, "Empty Chairs at Empty Tables", should begin a cappella in order to better express Marius' guilt and pain.
- Helena Bonham Carter and Sacha Baron Cohen as the Thénardiers, a pair of swindling innkeepers. Hooper previously collaborated with Bonham Carter in The King's Speech, in which she portrayed Queen Elizabeth, King George VI's wife. Baron Cohen and Bonham Carter previously co-starred in the film adaptation of the musical Sweeney Todd: The Demon Barber of Fleet Street. Baron Cohen's decision to accept the role of Thénardier forced him to abandon a previous commitment to Django Unchained.
- Samantha Barks as Éponine, the Thénardiers' daughter. Having previously played the role at the 25th Anniversary concert and in the West End production, Barks said "there was similarities in playing the role—they're the same character—but Éponine in the novel and Éponine in the musical are two kind of different girls, so to me it was the thrill of merging those two together, to get something that still had that heart and soul that we all connect to in the musical, but also the awkward, self-loathing teenager that we see in the novel, trying to merge those two together." She found Jackman "fascinating to learn from, and I feel like that's the way it should be done". Natalya Wallace plays a young Éponine.
- Aaron Tveit as Enjolras, the leader of Les Amis de l'ABC. Hoping to play Marius, Tveit submitted an audition tape in which he sang "Empty Chairs at Empty Tables" and "In My Life". He had never performed any role in the musical. He also said of Enjolras that "once I got more and more familiar with the material and when I read the novel, I was like, 'Wow this is a really, really great role,' and I felt very much better suited for it." Tveit said the shooting of the film was "almost as grueling as a marathon".
- Daniel Huttlestone as Gavroche, the wise and heroic street urchin, who displays a fresh, lucid and ironic look at contemporary French society. He had performed the same role at the Queen's Theatre in London, staying with them for a year before being cast to reprise Gavroche in the film adaptation. His performance was praised both by public and critics, some of whom viewed him as a scene-stealer.

Colm Wilkinson and Frances Ruffelle, two of the original cast members involved in the West End and Broadway productions of the English version (as Jean Valjean and Éponine, respectively), make appearances. Wilkinson plays the Bishop of Digne, while Ruffelle plays a prostitute. Hadley Fraser, who previously played Grantaire in the 25th Anniversary Concert and Javert and Marius on the West End, appears as the Army General. Another West End actor, Gina Beck, appears as one of the "Turning Men". Michael Jibson plays the foreman of the factory in which Fantine works and is fired from. Stephen Tate plays Fauchelevent, a man Valjean rescues from under a cart that later helps Valjean and Cosette escape.

Several actors in the West End production of the musical appear as members of the student society, including George Blagden as Grantaire; Killian Donnelly as Combeferre; Fra Fee as Courfeyrac; Alistair Brammer as Jean Prouvaire; Hugh Skinner as Joly; Gabriel Vick as Feuilly; Iwan Lewis as Bahorel; and Stuart Neal as Bossuet. Blagden was cast in January 2012. Ian Pirie, Adam Pearce, Julian Bleach, and Marc Pickering portray Babet, Brujon, Claquesous, and Montparnasse, members of Thenadier's gang. Other stage actors including Kate Fleetwood, Hannah Waddingham, Jamie Muscato, Daniel Evans and Kerry Ellis have small parts in the film along with actors who previously starred in various productions of Les Misérables.

== Musical numbers ==
A highlights soundtrack album was released via Universal Republic Records on 21 December 2012. Republic confirmed on 25 January 2013 via Twitter that a 2-disc deluxe soundtrack was in production alongside the DVD and Blu-ray; it was released 19 March 2013.

The film contains every song from the original stage musical with the exception of "I Saw Him Once" and "Dog Eats Dog", although many songs have been partially or extensively cut. "The Attack on Rue Plumet" and "Little People" were especially shortened. In addition, the Bishop sings with Fantine during "Valjean's Death" instead of Eponine, as was in the stage musical. "Stars" was also moved to before "Look Down", which echoes the original 1985 London production. The lyrics of some songs were also changed to suit the changes in setting or narrative to the stage musical. In addition to the cuts, a new song, "Suddenly" was added, new music was composed for the battle scenes, and the order of several songs changed from the stage musical. Several major pieces—primarily "Who Am I?", "Stars", and the two "Soliloquy" pieces—are performed in a different key from most recordings.

1. "Look Down" – Convicts, Javert, Valjean^{†§}
2. "The Bishop" – Bishop of Digne^{†§}
3. "Valjean's Soliloquy" – Valjean^{†§}
4. "At the End of the Day" – Poor, Foreman, Workers, Factory Women, Fantine, Valjean^{†§}
5. "The Runaway Cart" – Valjean, Javert
6. "The Docks (Lovely Ladies)" – Sailors, Old Woman, Fantine, Crone, Whores, Pimp, Toothman^{§}
7. "I Dreamed a Dream" – Fantine^{†§}
8. "Fantine's Arrest" – Bamatabois, Fantine, Javert, Valjean^{§}
9. "Who Am I?" – Valjean^{§}
10. "Fantine's Death" – Fantine, Valjean^{§}
11. "The Confrontation" – Javert, Valjean^{†§}
12. "Castle on a Cloud" – Young Cosette, Mme. Thénardier^{†§}
13. "Master of the House" – Thénardier, Mme. Thénardier, Inn Patrons^{†§}
14. "The Well Scene" – Valjean, Young Cosette^{§}
15. "The Bargain" – Valjean, Thénardier, Mme. Thénardier^{§}
16. "The Thénardier Waltz of Treachery" – Thénardier, Valjean, Mme. Thénardier, Young Cosette^{§}
17. "Suddenly" – Valjean^{†§}
18. "The Convent" – Valjean^{§}
19. "Stars" – Javert^{§}
20. "Paris/Look Down" – Gavroche, Beggars, Enjolras, Marius, Students^{§}
21. "The Robbery" – Thénardier, Mme. Thénardier, Éponine, Valjean^{§}
22. "Javert's Intervention" – Javert, Thénardier^{§}
23. "Éponine's Errand" – Éponine, Marius
24. "ABC Café/Red and Black" – Students, Enjolras, Marius, Grantaire, Gavroche^{†§}
25. "In My Life" – Cosette, Valjean, Marius, Éponine^{§}
26. "A Heart Full of Love" – Marius, Cosette, Éponine^{†§}
27. "The Attack on Rue Plumet" – Thénardier, Thieves, Éponine, Valjean
28. "On My Own" – Éponine^{†§}
29. "One Day More" – Valjean, Marius, Cosette, Éponine, Enjolras, Javert, Thénardier, Mme. Thénardier, Cast of Les Misérables^{†§}
30. "Do You Hear the People Sing?" – Enjolras, Marius, Students, Beggars^{§}
31. "Building the Barricade (Upon These Stones)" – Enjolras, Javert, Gavroche, Students^{§}
32. "Javert's Arrival" – Javert, Enjolras^{§}
33. "Little People" – Gavroche, Students, Enjolras, Javert^{§}
34. "A Little Fall of Rain" – Éponine, Marius^{§}
35. "Night of Anguish" – Enjolras, Marius, Valjean, Javert, Students
36. "Drink With Me" – Grantaire, Marius, Gavroche, Students^{†§}
37. "Bring Him Home" – Valjean^{†§}
38. "Dawn of Anguish" – Enjolras, Marius, Gavroche, Students^{§}
39. "The Second Attack (Death of Gavroche)" – Gavroche, Enjolras, Students, Army Officer^{§}
40. "The Sewers" – Valjean, Javert^{§}
41. "Javert's Suicide" – Javert^{†§}
42. "Turning" – Parisian women^{§}
43. "Empty Chairs at Empty Tables" – Marius^{†§}
44. "A Heart Full of Love [Reprise]" – Marius, Cosette, Valjean, Gillenormand^{§}
45. "Valjean's Confession" – Valjean, Marius^{§}
46. "Suddenly [Reprise]" – Marius, Cosette^{§}
47. "Wedding Chorale" – Chorus, Marius, Thérnardier, Mme. Thérnardier^{§}
48. "Beggars at the Feast" – Thénardier, Mme. Thénardier^{§}
49. "Valjean's Death" – Valjean, Fantine, Cosette, Marius, Bishop of Digne^{†§}
50. "Do You Hear the People Sing? [Reprise] / Epilogue" – The Cast of Les Misérables^{†§}
- ^{†} Included on the highlights edition soundtrack
- ^{§} Included on the deluxe edition soundtrack

== Production ==
=== Development ===
In 1988, Alan Parker was considered to direct a film adaptation of the Les Misérables musical. In 1991, Bruce Beresford signed on to be the film's director.

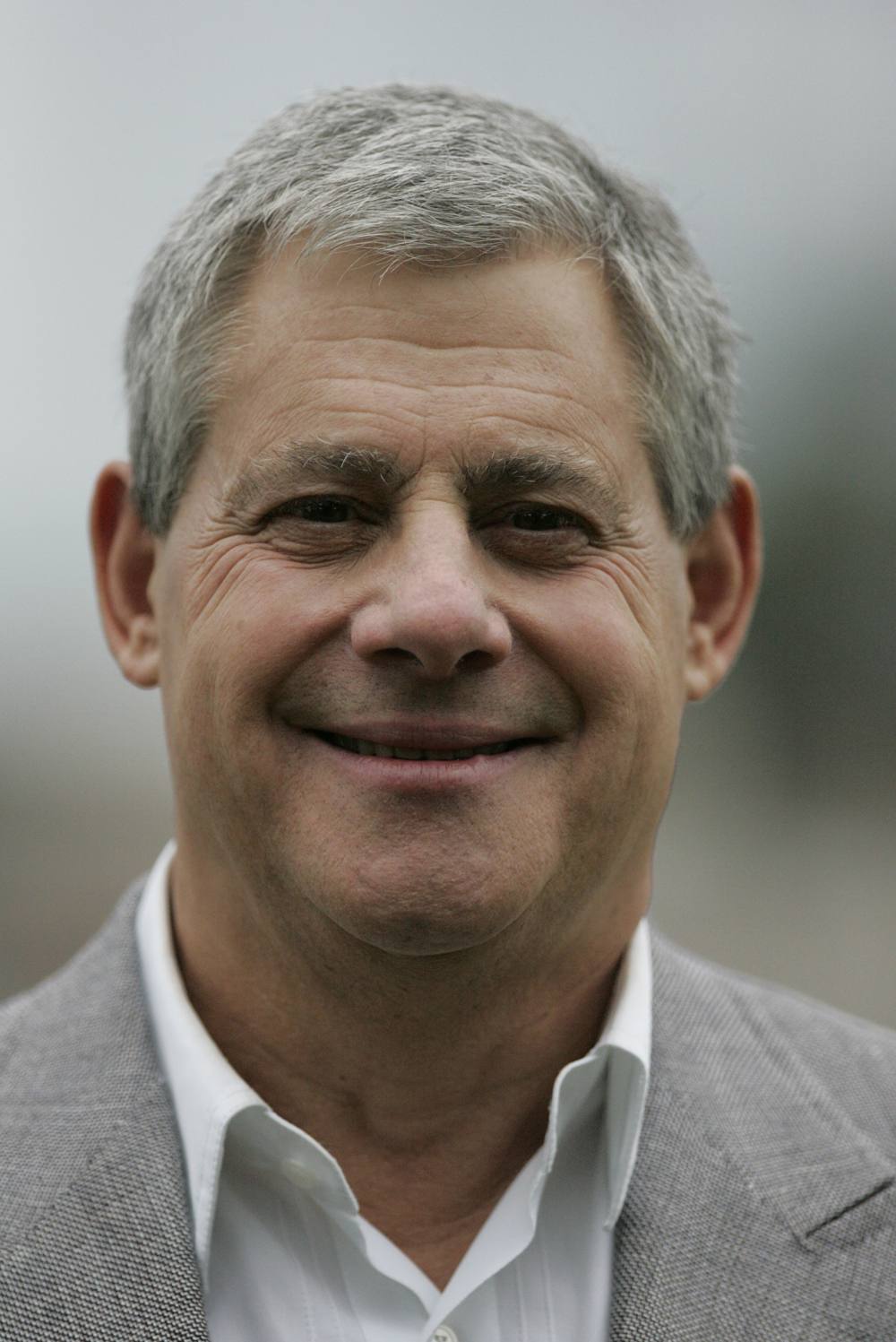
Producer Cameron Mackintosh had an integral role in facilitating the production of the film.

In 1992, producer Cameron Mackintosh announced that the film would be co-produced by TriStar Pictures. However, the film was abandoned. In 2005, Mackintosh later confirmed that interest in turning the musical into a film adaptation had resumed during the early months of that year. Mackintosh said that he wanted the film to be directed by "someone who has a vision for the show that will put the show's original team, including [Mackintosh], back to work." He also said that he wanted the film audiences to make it "fresh as the actual show".

In 2009, producer Eric Fellner began negotiations with Mackintosh to acquire the film's rights and concluded it near the end of 2011. Fellner, Tim Bevan, and Debra Hayward were hired as producers alongside Mackintosh, and engaged William Nicholson to write a screenplay for the film. Nicholson wrote the draft within six weeks time.

The DVD and Blu-ray release of Les Misérables in Concert: The 25th Anniversary confirmed an announcement of the musical's film adaptation.

=== Pre-production ===
In March 2011, director Tom Hooper began negotiations to direct Les Misérables from the screenplay by William Nicholson. Production on the film officially began in June that year, with Cameron Mackintosh and Working Title Films co-producing. Having already approached Hooper prior to production with the desire of playing Jean Valjean, Hugh Jackman began negotiations to star in the film alongside Paul Bettany as Javert. Other stars who became attached to the project included Hathaway and Helena Bonham Carter.

In September 2011, Jackman was cast as Jean Valjean and Russell Crowe was cast as Javert. The following month, Mackintosh confirmed that Fantine would be played by Hathaway. Before Hathaway was cast, Amy Adams, Jessica Biel, Tammy Blanchard, Kristin Kreuk, Marion Cotillard, Kate Winslet and Rebecca Hall were also considered for the part. For the role, Hathaway allowed her hair to be cut short on camera for a scene in which her character sells her hair, stating that the lengths she goes to for her roles "don't feel like sacrifices. Getting to transform is one of the best parts of [acting]." The role also required her to lose 25 pounds (11 kg).

In addition to Hathaway's weight loss, Hugh Jackman also lost an extreme amount of weight for the opening scene as Jean Valjean when he is imprisoned in a labor camp. To achieve an emaciated look, Jackman committed to a minimalistic diet and intense workouts. In an interview with Epix, Jackman revealed that he went on 45 minute morning runs on an empty stomach which Hathaway later used as a weight loss tactic with Jackman's help, and he went on a 36-hour liquid fast. This allowed him to rapidly lose ten pounds and caused his eyes and cheeks to sink severely.

In November 2011, Eddie Redmayne was cast as Marius Pontmercy. The shortlist of actresses for the role of Éponine included Scarlett Johansson, Lea Michele, Miley Cyrus, Tamsin Egerton, Taylor Swift, and Evan Rachel Wood.

In January 2012, the press reported that the role of Éponine had officially been offered to Taylor Swift. However, Swift later stated that those reports were not entirely accurate. At the end of the month, Mackintosh made a special appearance during the curtain call of the Oliver! UK tour at the Palace Theatre, Manchester, announcing that the tour's Nancy, Samantha Barks, who had played Éponine in the West End production and in the 25th Anniversary concert, would reprise the role in the film. Barks had been auditioning for 15 weeks by that point.

Originally, an unknown was sought for the role of Cosette, with an open casting call in New York City in December 2011. In January 2012, reports surfaced that Amanda Seyfried had been offered the role instead. Eddie Redmayne confirmed both Seyfried's casting and that of Bonham Carter as Madame Thénardier in an interview on 12 January. Hooper confirmed that he would stick to the musical's essentially sung-through form and would thus introduce very little additional dialogue. Hooper confirmed that the film would not be shot in 3D, expressing his opinion that it would not enhance the emotional narrative of the film and would distract audiences from the storytelling.

Following this announcement, reports surfaced in the press that Sacha Baron Cohen had begun talks to join the cast as Thénardier and that Aaron Tveit had been cast as Enjolras. Later that month, the press officially confirmed Tveit's casting as Enjolras. Colm Wilkinson and Frances Ruffelle (the original Valjean and Éponine, respectively, in the West End and Broadway productions) appeared in the film. Wilkinson played the Bishop of Digne, and Ruffelle had a cameo as a prostitute. George Blagden was cast as Grantaire. In an interview with BBC Radio 4's Front Row, Tom Hooper revealed that Claude-Michel Schönberg will be composing one new song and additional music. The director also expanded on the performers singing live on set, which he felt would eliminate the need to recapture "locked" performances and allow more creative freedom. More details of this were confirmed by Eddie Redmayne in an interview. He stated that the cast would sing to piano tracks (via earpiece) and that the orchestra would be added in post-production.

In February 2012, casting auditions involving extras for the film took place at the University of Portsmouth and Chatham Maritime in Chatham. Several days later, Mackintosh officially confirmed that Bonham Carter would play Madame Thénardier. He also announced that the title of the newly created song for the film is "Suddenly" and that it "beautifully explains what happens when Valjean takes Cosette from the inn and looks after her."

The cast began rehearsals in January 2012, with principal photography due to begin in March. The press officially confirmed Baron Cohen's casting during the latter month. No table read took place before filming.

=== Filming ===
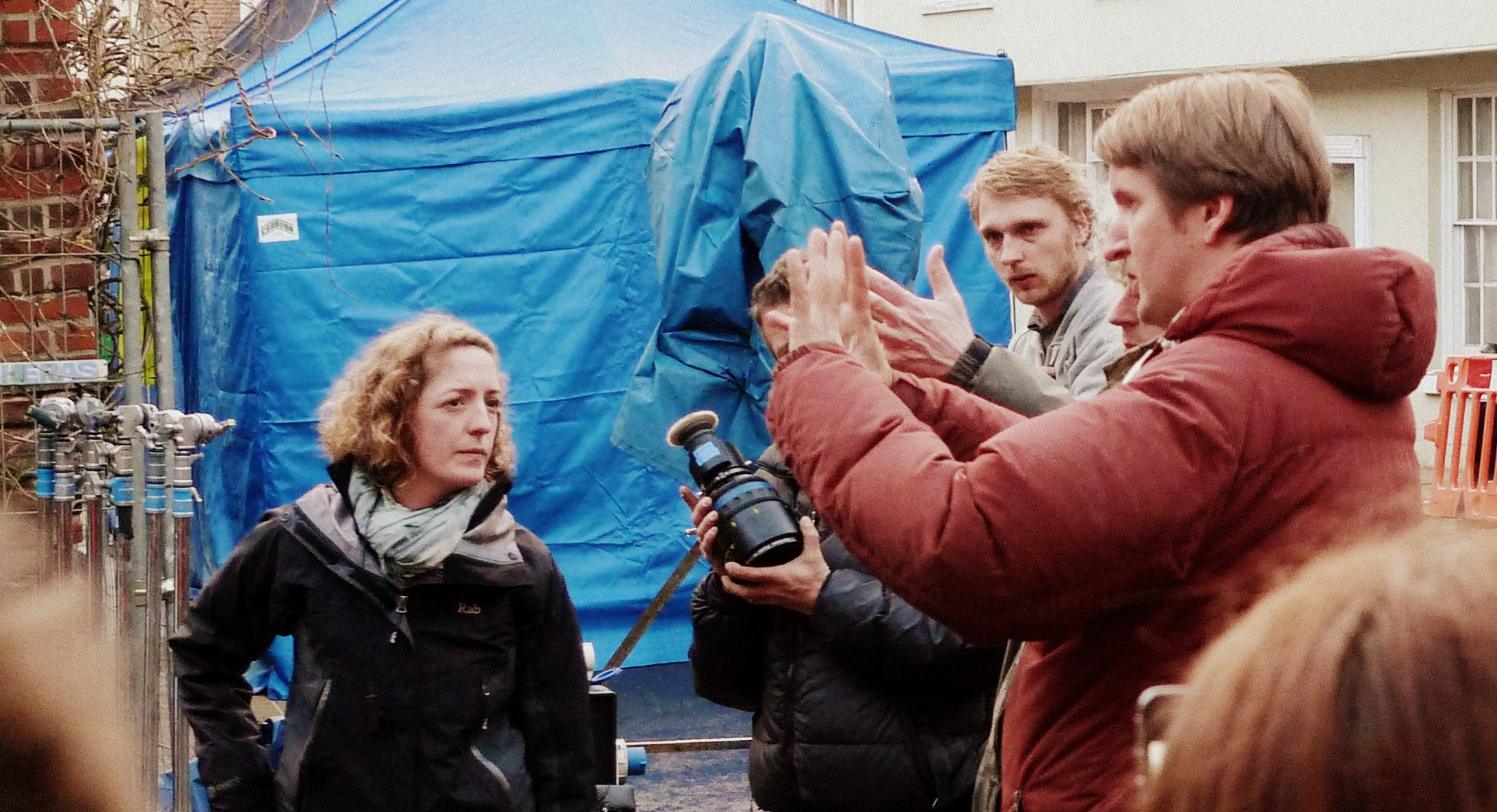
Tom Hooper directing the second unit of Les Misérables on location in Winchester in April 2012

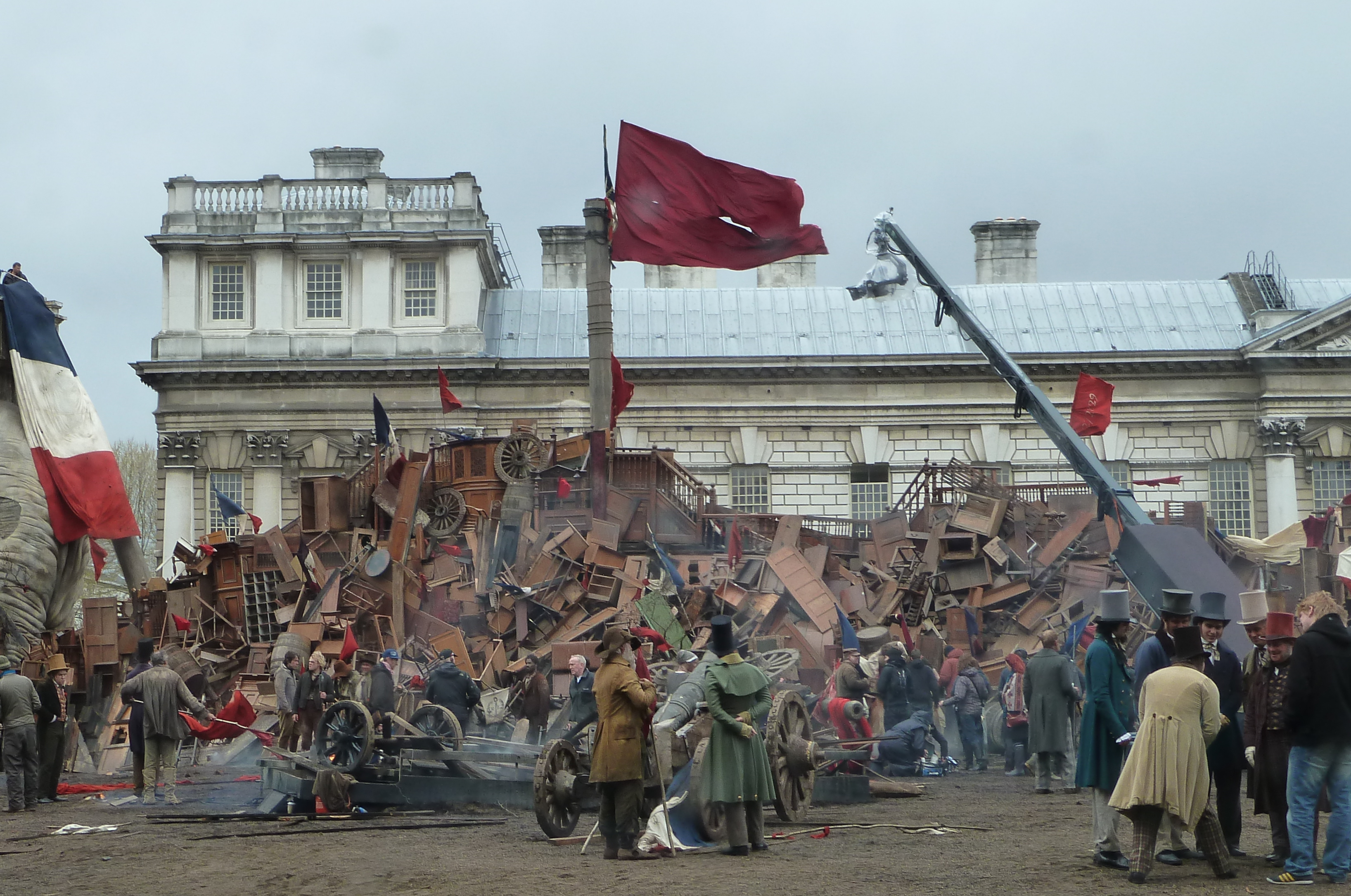
The film's set at Greenwich Naval College

With a production budget of $61 million, principal photography of the film began 8 March 2012 in Gourdon. Filming locations in England included Boughton House, the Chantry Chapel and Cloisters at Winchester College, Winchester Cathedral Close, Her Majesty's Naval Base Portsmouth, Chatham Dockyard, the Ashridge Estate, St Mary the Virgin Church, Ewelme, South Oxfordshire and Pinewood Studios. In April 2012, crews built a replica of the Elephant of the Bastille in Greenwich.

On-location filming also took place at Gourdon, Alpes-Maritimes in France. Footage of Hathaway singing "I Dreamed a Dream", a song from the musical, was shown at CinemaCon 26 April 2012. Russell Crowe confirmed 5 June 2012, on Twitter that he had finished filming. He was later followed by Samantha Barks, confirming that all of her scenes had too been completed. Jackman stated that all filming had been completed 23 June 2012. Some late filming occurred in Bath, Somerset, in October 2012 where stunt shots for Javert's suicide scene had to be reshot due to an error found with this footage during post-production. Bath was not the original filming location for this scene, but the late footage was captured at Pulteney Weir.

=== Post-production ===
The film's vocals were recorded live on set using live piano accompaniments played through earpieces as a guide, with the orchestral accompaniment recorded in post-production, rather than the traditional method where the film's musical soundtracks are usually pre-recorded and played back on set to which actors lip-sync. Production sound mixer Simon Hayes used 50 DPA 4071 lavalier microphones to record the vocals. Hooper explained his choice:

I just felt ultimately, it was a more natural way of doing it. You know, when actors do dialogue, they have freedom in time, they have freedom in pacing. They can stop for a moment, they can speed up. I simply wanted to give the actors the normal freedoms that they would have. If they need a bit for an emotion or a feeling to form in the eyes before they sing, I can take that time. If they cry, they can cry through a song. When you're doing it to playback, to the millisecond you have to copy what you do. You have no freedom in the moment – and acting is the illusion of being free in the moment.

Although the creative team stated that this live recording method was unique and "a world's first", many films have used this technique before, notably early talkies, when lip-syncing had not been perfected. More recent examples include the 1975 20th Century Fox film At Long Last Love; the adaptation of The Magic Flute, released that same year; the 1995 adaptation of The Fantasticks; portions of the 1996 adaptation of Andrew Lloyd Webber's Evita; the 2001 film version of Hedwig and the Angry Inch; and the 2007 film Across the Universe, with songs by the Beatles.

Producers announced 27 August 2012, that recording sessions for Les Misérables would begin in London 10 October and featured a 70-piece orchestra. They also announced that composer Claude-Michel Schönberg was composing additional music to underscore the film.

== Distribution ==
=== Marketing ===
Producers released an extended first look on the film's official Facebook page on 20 September 2012. This short introduces and explains Hooper's method of recording vocals live on set, comparing it to the traditional method of pre-recording the vocals in a studio months in advance. Hugh Jackman stated that filming in this way allows him more creative freedom with the material and that he "only has to worry about acting it." Both Hooper and the actors believe that this choice of production method will make the film feel much more emotional, raw, and real. The actors praised Hooper for his method and provide brief interviews throughout the video. Hooper mentions, "I thought it was an amazing opportunity to do something genuinely groundbreaking."

Clips of Jackman, Hathaway, Seyfried, Redmayne and Barks singing were received very positively, especially the teaser trailer's presentation of "I Dreamed a Dream" by Hathaway. Producers released a new poster, featuring young Cosette (in what is essentially a real-life version of the musical's emblem), played by Isabelle Allen, on 24 September 2012, on the film's official Facebook page. They released posters featuring Jean Valjean, Javert, Fantine, and Cosette on 12 October, with additional posters of Thénardiers and Marius released on 1 November 2012.

=== Release ===
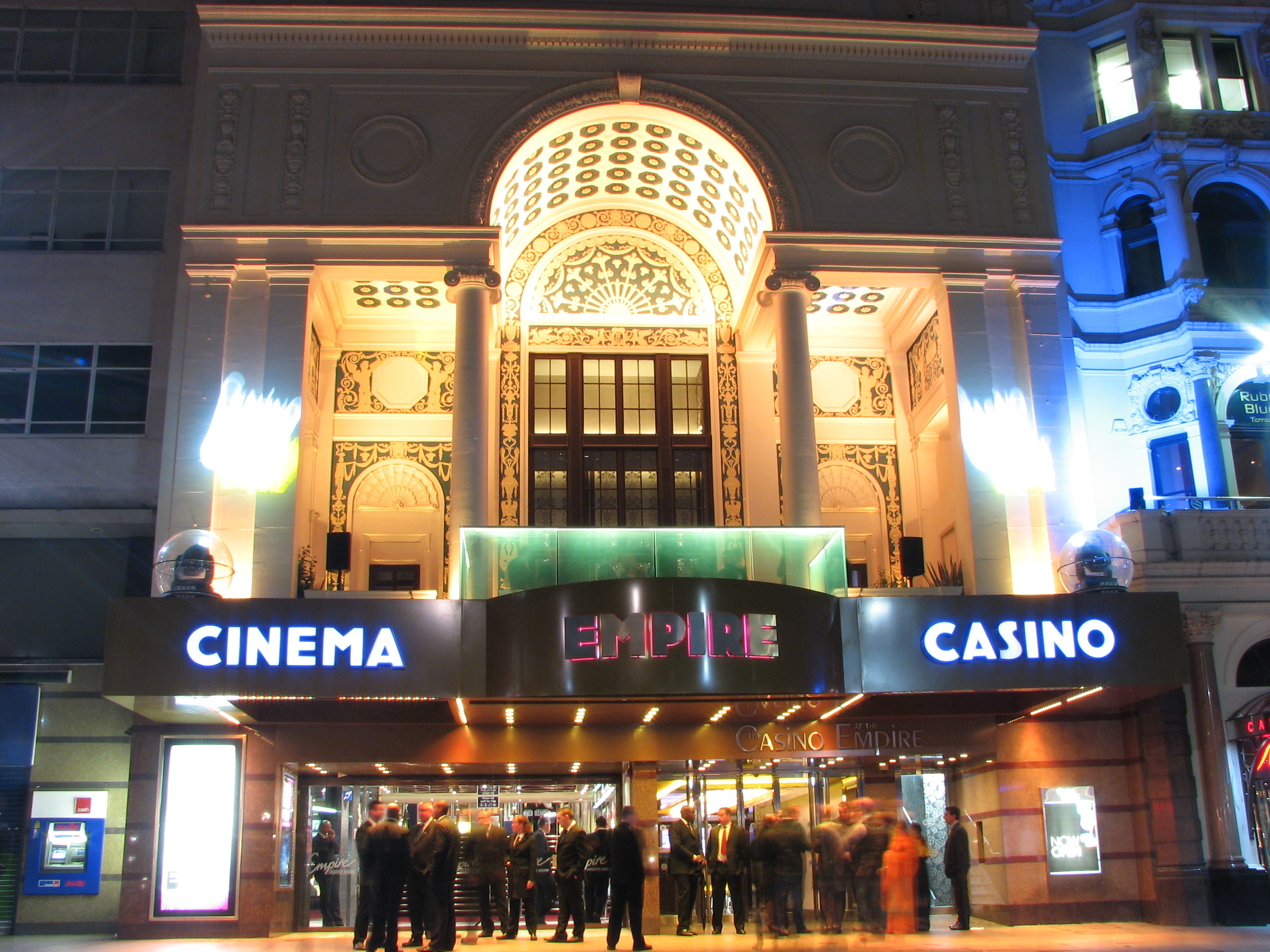
The Empire, Leicester Square in London, where Les Misérables's premiere took place on 5 December 2012

Les Misérables was originally set to be released on 7 December 2012 before the studio moved it to 14 December in the United States; however, on 18 September, they delayed the film's release date to 25 December, so as not to conflict with the opening of The Hobbit: An Unexpected Journey, which opened on 14 December. Because of this, it opened alongside Django Unchained. Release date for the United Kingdom was on 11 January 2013.

Les Misérables was screened for the first time at Lincoln Center in New York City, on 23 November 2012, where it received a standing ovation from the audience. This was followed by a screening the next day in Los Angeles, which also received positive reviews.

Les Misérables premiered on 5 December 2012, at the Empire, Leicester Square in London. Red carpet footage was screened live online in an event hosted by Michael Ball, the original Marius of the West End. The film was released in select IMAX theatres in New York, Los Angeles, Toronto, and Montreal the same day as its domestic theatrical release, 25 December 2012. Les Misérables was also released internationally by IMAX theatres on 10 January 2013. The film was distributed by Universal Pictures in North America, Latin America and most of Europe, and Toho (through Toho-Towa) in Japan.

=== 2024 Dolby Cinema remaster and re-release ===
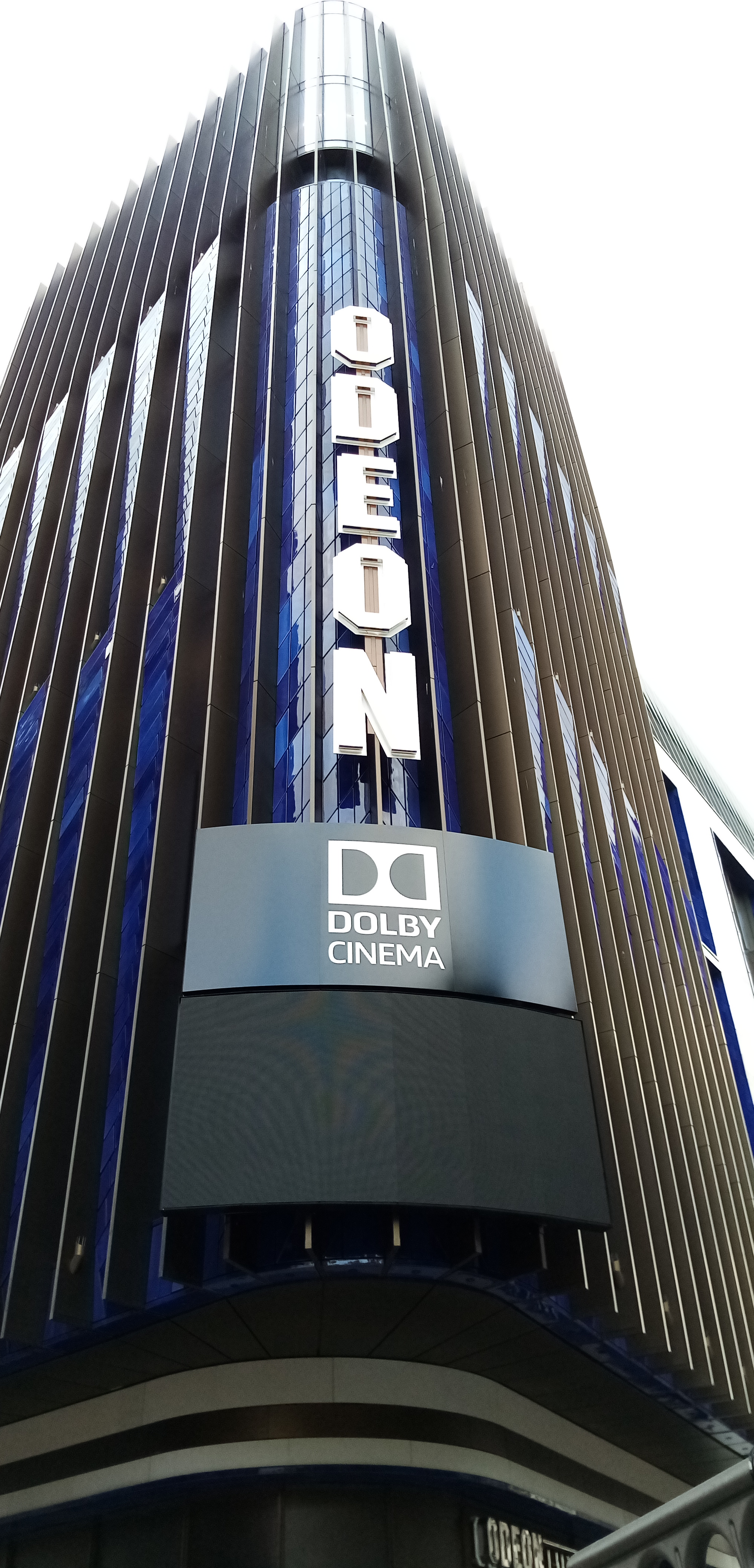
The Odeon Luxe West End in London, where the film's 2024 Dolby Cinema remaster premiered

On 16 August 2023, Mackintosh announced that, in anticipation of the stage musical's then-forthcoming 40th anniversary in 2025, the film would be digitally remixed and remastered in Dolby Vision and Dolby Atmos. Mackintosh, Hooper, music producer Lee McCutcheon, music director Stephen Metcalfe and sound mixer Andy Nelson all supervised the Dolby Atmos remix for this version. On the remaster, Hooper hoped that it would give "a whole new audience of people who haven't seen it on the big screen the chance to experience it the right way, as in not on a phone" and praised the Dolby Atmos mix as "spreading the orchestra" around the viewer, creating an "immersive, high quality musical experience" and the "musical equivalent of a wide shot".

This version of the film held its premiere at the Odeon Luxe West End on 6 February 2024 and was released in theatres for one-week engagements in select Dolby Cinema and AMC Theatres locations on 14 February 2024 in the United Kingdom, Australia and Ireland, on 23 February 2024 in the United States, 14 March 2024 in the Netherlands, and on 9 May 2024 in New Zealand, with a worldwide rollout that followed throughout the rest of the year, including South Korea, Germany, Denmark and Japan in the second quarter of 2024. On the re-release, Hugh Jackman remarked "I'm absolutely thrilled to hear about the re-release of Les Misérables. It was one of the great experiences of my movie career, something I will never forget, an incredible honour. I got to work with some of the best in the world, led by our fearless director Tom Hooper. Russell, Annie, Amanda, Samantha, Sasha, and Helena. It was just incredible, and I'm so happy that folks are getting a chance to see it on the big screen again, as it was intended. I hope you all enjoy it."

=== Home media ===
The film was confirmed for home release on 13 May 2013 on DVD, Blu-ray, and VOD in the United Kingdom; it was released in the United States on 22 March 2013. The DVD contains three featurettes: The Stars of Les Misérables, Creating the Perfect Paris, and The Original Masterwork: Victor Hugo's Les Misérables, along with an audio commentary from director Tom Hooper. The Blu-ray has all DVD features including four additional featurettes: Les Misérables Singing Live, Battle at the Barricade, The West End Connection, and Les Misérables On Location. It was released on 4K Blu-ray in the United States on 18 July 2023 and in the United Kingdom on 11 September 2023.

== Reception ==
=== Box office ===
Les Misérables grossed $149.3 million in the United States and Canada, and $293.5 million in other territories, for a worldwide total of $442.8 million.

In North America, Les Misérables opened 25 December 2012 in 2,808 theatres, placing first at the box office with $18.1 million. This amount broke the record for the highest opening day gross for a musical film, previously held by High School Musical 3: Senior Year, and was also the second highest opening day gross for a film released on Christmas. It earned $27.3 million in its opening weekend, placing third behind Django Unchained and The Hobbit: An Unexpected Journey.

The film was released in the United Kingdom 11 January 2013 and earned £8.1 ($13.1) million in its opening weekend, making it the largest opening weekend for a musical film, as well as for Working Title. The film would hold the record for the highest worldwide opening gross for a film adaptation of a stage musical until 2024 with the $162.9 million worldwide opening of Wicked.

The one-week North American engagement of the film's 2024 Dolby Cinema re-release began on 23 February 2024 in 162 theaters, opening against the global IMAX re-release of Christopher Nolan's 2020 science fiction film Tenet. It grossed $160,000 on its first day for a three-day total of $337,000 and completed its run with $450,370. During the re-release's engagement in New Zealand in May 2024, it grossed $6,778 in its first weekend and completed its run with $7,850. In the end, the re-release added a worldwide total of $458,220 to its lifetime box office gross.

=== Critical response ===
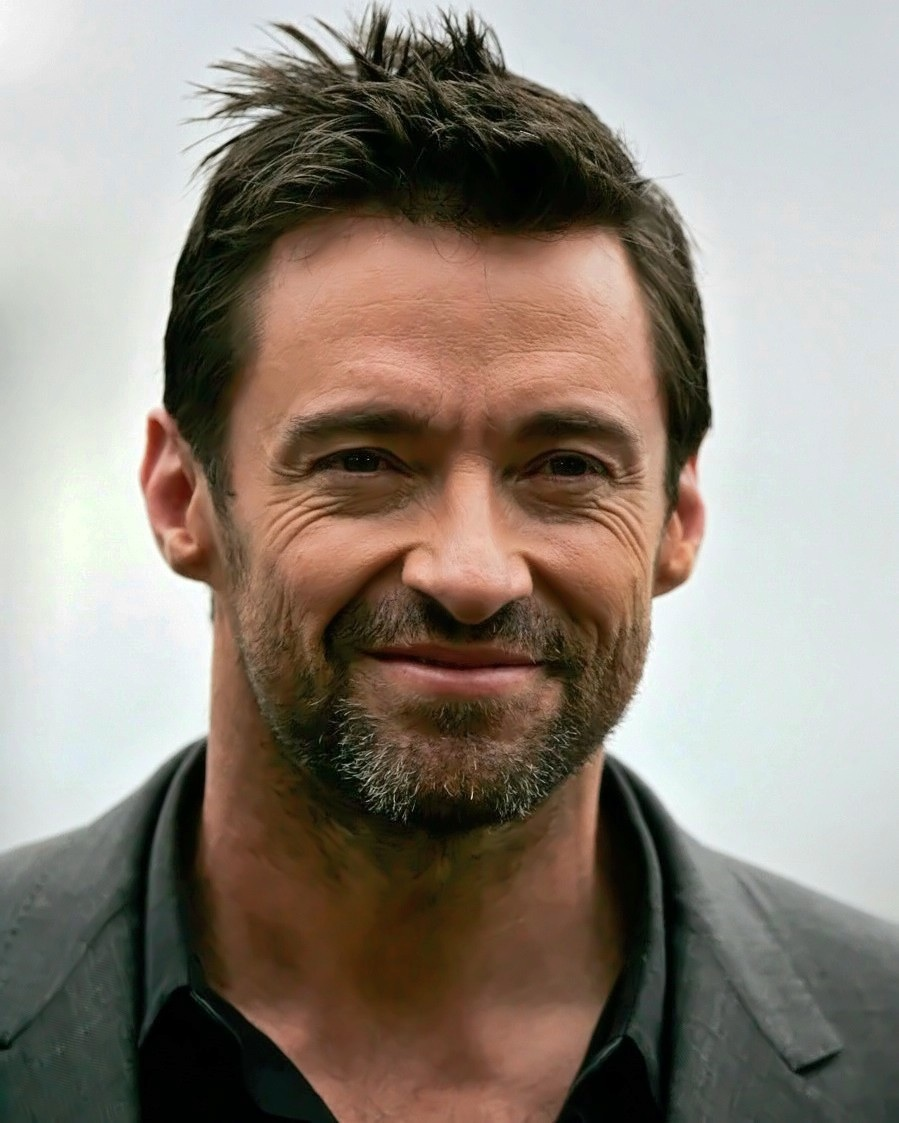
Hugh Jackman won the Golden Globe Award for Best Actor – Motion Picture Musical or Comedy and earned a nomination for the Academy Award for Best Actor for his performance as Jean Valjean in the film.

The review aggregator website Rotten Tomatoes reported a 70% approval rating with an average rating of 7.0/10, based on an aggregation of 252 reviews. The site's consensus reads: "Impeccably mounted but occasionally bombastic, Les Misérables largely succeeds thanks to bravura performances from its distinguished cast." On Metacritic, the film achieved an average score of 63 out of 100 based on 41 reviews, signifying "generally favorable" reviews. Audiences polled by CinemaScore gave the film an average grade of "A" on an A+ to F scale. The film was generally praised for its acting and ensemble cast, with Jackman, Hathaway, Redmayne, Seyfried, Barks and Tveit being singled out for praise. However, Crowe's performance was criticized. The live singing, which was heavily promoted in marketing for the film, received a more divided response.

Robbie Collin of The Daily Telegraph gave the film five stars: "Les Misérables is a blockbuster, and the special effects are emotional: explosions of grief; fireballs of romance; million-buck conflagrations of heartbreak. Accordingly, you should see it in its opening week, on a gigantic screen, with a fanatical crowd."

The Guardian's Peter Bradshaw concurred: "Even as a non-believer in this kind of "sung-through" musical, I was battered into submission by this mesmeric and sometimes compelling film ...". Kenneth Turan of Los Angeles Times gave a positive review, saying that the film "is a clutch player that delivers an emotional wallop when it counts. You can walk into the theater as an agnostic, but you may just leave singing with the choir." Peter Travers of Rolling Stone said, "Besides being a feast for the eyes and ears, Les Misérables overflows with humor, heartbreak, rousing action and ravishing romance. Damn the imperfections, it's perfectly marvelous."

Todd McCarthy of The Hollywood Reporter said, "As the enduring success of this property has shown, there are large, emotionally susceptible segments of the population ready to swallow this sort of thing, but that doesn't mean it's good."

Manohla Dargis of The New York Times wrote: "[Director Tom] Hooper can be very good with actors. But his inability to leave any lily ungilded—to direct a scene without tilting or hurtling or throwing the camera around—is bludgeoning and deadly. By the grand finale, when tout le monde is waving the French tricolor in victory, you may instead be raising the white flag in exhausted defeat."

Justin Chang of Variety wrote that the film "will more than satisfy the show's legions of fans." Chang praised the performances of Jackman, Hathaway, Barks, Tveit, Redmayne, and Seyfried (i.e., every leading cast member except Crowe) but said that the film's editing "seems reluctant to slow down and let the viewer simply take in the performances."

Calum Marsh of Slant Magazine gave the film one star out of four, and wrote: "Flaws—and there are a great many that would have never made the cut were this a perfectible studio recording—are conveniently swept under the rug of candid expression ... the worst quality of Les Misérables's live singing is simply that it puts too much pressure on a handful of performers who frankly cannot sing.... Fisheye lenses and poorly framed close-ups abound in Les Misérables, nearly every frame a revelation of one man's bad taste ... One would be hard-pressed to describe this, despite the wealth of beauty on display, as anything but an ugly film, shot and cut ineptly. Everything in the film, songs included, is cranked to 11, the melodrama of it all soaring. So it's odd that this kind of showboating maximalism should be ultimately reduced to a few fisheye'd faces, mugging for their close-up, as the people sing off-key and broken." Chicago Tribune critic Michael Phillips gave the film one and a half stars out of four, writing: "The camera bobs and weaves like a drunk, frantically. So you have hammering close-ups, combined with woozy insecurity each time more than two people are in the frame. ...too little in this frenzied mess of a film registers because Hooper is trying to make everything register at the same nutty pitch."

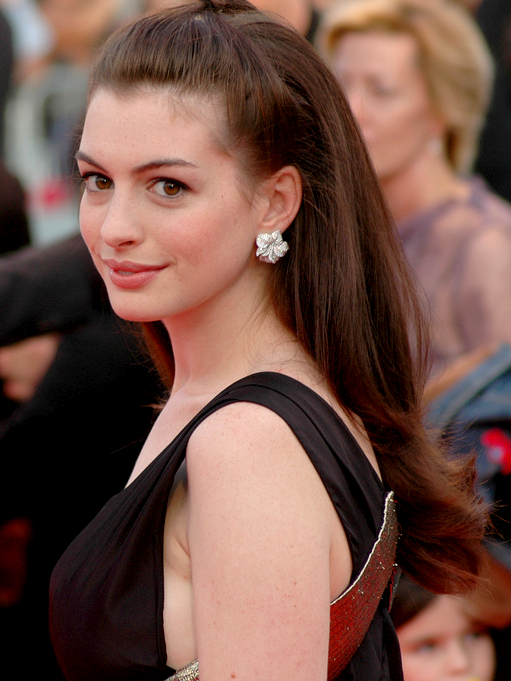
Anne Hathaway received widespread critical acclaim, earning the Academy, BAFTA, Critics' Choice, Golden Globe and Screen Actors Guild Award for her performance as Fantine in the film.

Some specific performances were reviewed very positively. Anne Hathaway's performance of the ballad "I Dreamed a Dream" was met with praise, with many comparing its showstopper-like quality to Jennifer Hudson's performance of "And I Am Telling You I'm Not Going" from Dreamgirls. Christopher Orr of The Atlantic wrote that "Hathaway gives it everything she has, beginning in quiet sorrow before building to a woebegone climax: she gasps, she weeps, she coughs. If you are blown away by the scene—as many will be; it will almost certainly earn Hathaway her first Oscar—this may be the film for you." Ann Hornaday of The Washington Post writes that "The centerpiece of a movie composed entirely of centerpieces belongs to Anne Hathaway, who as the tragic heroine Fantine sings another of the memorable numbers". Joy Tipping of The Dallas Morning News described Hathaway's performance as "angelic".

Claudia Puig of USA Today describes her as "superb as the tragic Fantine". Travers felt that "A dynamite Hathaway shatters every heart when she sings how 'life has killed the dream I dreamed'. Her volcanic performance has Oscar written all over it." She was widely considered to be the frontrunner for the Academy Award for Best Supporting Actress, ultimately winning it.

Eddie Redmayne also received considerable praise for his performance with Bloomberg News saying that "Eddie Redmayne—most recently seen as the eager young production assistant in My Week with Marilyn—delivers by far the most moving and memorable performance in the film as the young firebrand Marius, who, along with his fellow students, is caught up in France's political upheavals in the 19th century."

Samantha Barks earned praise for her portrayal of Éponine, with Digital Journal saying: "Samantha Barks plays Éponine with such grace, sweetness, and sadness that it is hard to imagine anyone else in the role", while Claudia Puig of USA Today calls her "heartbreakingly soulful", Richard Roeper of Chicago Sun-Times described her performance as "star-making".

Crowe's performance was less well received. In response to those criticisms, Tom Hooper told USA Today:

We auditioned hundreds of hundreds of people — opera singers, musical actors, film actors, actors who couldn't sing or could sing. The truth is, you need people who can hold a movie camera. To find brilliant film actors who are brilliant singers — there are so few choices. I ultimately stand by what Russell did. I love him in the film. I embraced a kind of raw attitude to the vocals that is unusual in the modern age. I tried Auto-Tune, composites of different takes. But I ended up using only the original live take. Otherwise, there was a loss of realism, integrity, and emotional vulnerability.

Emma Gosnell, writing for The Daily Telegraph, stated that she walked out of the showing due to the poor singing, specifically citing Crowe and Jackman as the cause. Playback singer Marni Nixon said "[Crowe] was nothing. It wasn't that he was choosing to sing like that, he just couldn't do anything else" and that Jackman acted well but "could have done with a nobler voice".

=== Legacy ===
Since its release, reception towards the film has remained mostly positive. In 2018, Den of Geek included it on its list of the "Best Movie Musicals of the 21st Century," where the reviewer wrote "Having the unenviable task of adapting a sprawling musical theater epic, which in turn is based on an even more sprawling and longwinded Victor Hugo novel, Hooper makes a Herculean effort of marrying the grit of that text with the grandeur of one of the richest songbooks in history." The site also included Eddie Redmayne's rendition of "Empty Chairs at Empty Tables" on its list of "The Best Musical Numbers in 21st Century Films", where it was noted that:

Redmayne's performance is as beautiful as it is painful. Beginning the famous song a cappella, the grief of the character is present in every breath and every nuance of his expression. With the camera trained in an extreme close-up of his face, we see a man consumed with guilt and beyond consolation ... As the camera cuts back to a mid-shot we are offered a view of a building that used to be a hub of excitement and the absence is choking. Marius bears his soul in this incredible solo and as the orchestra surges and he sings "oh my friends... my friends don't ask me what your sacrifice was for", you will likely be in tears also.

NextBestPicture also ranked it number 5 on its list of "The Top Movie Musicals Of The 21st Century So Far," calling it "a masterful tale of redemption, forgiveness, and love and this adaptation highlights those themes in a way that makes this the definitive adaptation of the famous musical". In 2020, HuffPost ranked it number 14 on its list of the "20 Best Movie Musicals Of The 21st Century". In 2022, MovieWeb ranked it number 3 on its list of the "Best Movie Musicals of the 21st Century", with the review praising Anne Hathaway's performance and her rendition of "I Dreamed a Dream" as the film's definitive highlight. The site also ranked it at number 13 on its list of "The Best Musical Movie Adaptations", with reviewers noting that it brought with it "the chance to see some of the world's most famous celebrities in classic roles; it also allows for greater cinematic effect as being on a closed set allows for the use of more risky props, like the weapons used from the barricades."

When the film celebrated its 10th anniversary in 2022, Screen Rant wrote a retrospective on the film, saying that elements such as its production values (mainly the costume and make-up designs and the use of large-scale production design), Hathaway's performance, the live singing and the story's themes still hold up. The site also ranked it at number 16 on its list of "The 35 Best Musicals of All Time" and number 8 on its list of "The 12 Best Movie Musicals of the 21st Century". In 2023, Collider ranked it number 9 on its list of "The 15 Best Historical Epics of All Time", calling it "one of the most potent and emotional musicals ever made". Marie Claire also included it on its list of "The 60 Best Musical Movies of All Time". That same year, Alexandra Ramos of CinemaBlend wrote a retrospective on the film, saying that while she initially loved the film upon seeing it when it first came out, she now felt that it was decent and that "there are better movie musicals out there", but said that the performances of Hathaway, Redmayne, Tveit and the younger actors, as well as the production design and the film's emotional impact, remain timeless.

In his review of the film's 2024 Dolby Cinema remaster, Jack Walters of Loud and Clear Reviews felt that the film itself "might not have aged perfectly, but [it] still knows the strengths of this story", while praising Hooper's "cinematic" direction, saying that:

the biggest advantage of cinema in contrast to theatre is the ability to create an entire world on-screen, as opposed to being limited to the physical space of a stage. Hooper capitalises on this fact with some brilliant production design and creative camera movements that fully realise the scope of this story, placing the audience directly in the middle of the action in a way that's simply not possible on-stage. It's one of the few legitimate arguments in favour of adapting this musical for the big screen – the film includes so much detail and environmental storytelling that adds new dynamics to this narrative.

In February 2024. Tim Grierson wrote a retrospective on the film for RogerEbert.com, focusing on re-evaluating Russell Crowe's performance and the initial public criticism surrounding that element, concluding his piece with:

Hardly wretched, he has perhaps never been so naked on screen as he was in Les Misérables, his Javert a man consumed with a sense of duty, his faulty larynx an indication of the deep emotional scars underneath the character's gruff exterior. It's not a great performance, but it's a brave, honest one. Russell Crowe has rarely done anything so bold since, mostly signing up for bloated franchises and forgettable B-movies. I don't love him in Les Mis, but I admire the attempt — in the film, you see him giving it his all. I wish he did so more often.

In February 2025, The Washington Post ranked the film at number 14 on its list of "The 25 best movie musicals of the 21st century", with Naveen Kumar writing:

Director Tom Hooper may have wet the litter box making 2019's Cats, but his work adapting that other 1980s megamusical expertly captures both its epic scale and intimate melodrama. Venturing far beyond what's possible onstage, his camera heightens the contrast between the massive churn of history and the destitute Parisians crushed underfoot. When battles break out, you can smell the gunpowder. And when the actors wail the indelible score, their tears practically flood the frame.

In July 2025, it was one of the films in contention for the "Readers' Choice" edition of The New York Times' list of "The 100 Best Movies of the 21st Century", finishing at number 475.

Hooper's decision to have the actors sing live on set for the musical numbers also marked a turning point for the movie musical genre that led to other films using the same modern techniques or some variation of them for either the entire film or a specific portion. Examples of these include the entireties of Cats (2019; also directed by Hooper), Dear Evan Hansen (2021), Cyrano (2021), and the Wicked film series (2024-), as well as portions of Into the Woods (2014) and La La Land (2016).

=== Cultural impact ===
Like the stage version, the film has been and continues to be widely referenced in popular culture. Notable examples include a 2013 Tumblr called "Les Mean Girls", which coupled images from the film with lines from the 2004 comedy film Mean Girls, a Key & Peele short parody where Keegan-Michael Key as Javert has trouble trying to sing over everyone else's lines, with Jordan Peele appearing as Valjean and the video itself being shot and directed in Tom Hooper's exact visual style from the film, and a 2014 Sesame Street parody titled Les Mousserables as part of its "Crumby Pictures" segment during the series' 44th season, which featured Cookie Monster as "Jean Bom-Bom" and used the production and character designs from this film. The film's version of the "Do You Hear The People Sing?" scene also became known for its use as a form of protest, when a clip of the scene circulated on Twitter during the lockdown caused by the 2022 Shanghai COVID-19 outbreak. The clip was ultimately blocked by the Chinese government to stop further protest. The stage version's portrayal of the barricade scenes, shot in the film's cinematography style and set to the original French version of "Do You Hear The People Sing?", was referenced as part of the introduction to the "Liberté" segment of the opening ceremony of the 2024 Summer Olympics.

=== Accolades ===
In 2013, the film won three Academy Awards in the categories Best Supporting Actress for Anne Hathaway, Best Makeup and Hairstyling and Best Sound Mixing, and was nominated for five more, including Best Picture and Best Actor (Hugh Jackman).

== See also ==
- Adaptations of Les Misérables
