= Suddenly (Les Misérables song) =

Song by Hugh Jackman

from the album Les Misérables: Highlights from the Motion Picture Soundtrack
- Released: December 21, 2012
- Length: 2:32
- Composer: Claude-Michel Schönberg
- Lyricists: Alain Boublil; Herbert Kretzmer
- Producers: Claude-Michel Schönberg; Stephen Metcalfe; Lee McCutcheon; Cameron Mackintosh; Anne Dudley

"Suddenly" is a song created for the 2012 film adaptation of the 1980 musical Les Misérables, included in both the film itself and the related soundtrack album. It was nominated for an Academy Award for Best Original Song in 2012.

== Production ==
When reading the book in preparation for the film, Tom Hooper realised that one major thing missing was an acknowledgment of the importance of Cosette's love to Valjean, as well as his accepting of fatherhood. Claude-Michel Schonberg said that this moment, "only a camera can catch", adding that "It's a feeling he never had before... on stage, it's very difficult to catch the intimacy of this moment."

Universal Pictures president of film music and publishing Mike Knobloch explains that Hooper "went to Claude-Michel Schonberg and Alain and Herbert and said, 'If we were going to do a new song, what if it were there? What if Jean Valjean sang a song that helped the audience understand that this is a big moment for him?' Herbert was the first to suggest the title 'Suddenly,' as in he suddenly realizes his value and purpose. He went to Alain and they brought it to life quickly."

It replaces a set of dialogue that appeared in the musical after Valjean acquires Cosette from the Thenardiers, and before the 9-year jump:

VALJEAN
Come, Cosette, come, my dear
From now on I will always be here
Where I go, you will be.

COSETTE
Will there be children
And castles to see?

VALJEAN
Yes, Cosette,
Yes, it's true

There's a castle just waiting for you...

There has been speculation by news outlets such as BroadwayWorld that the song "may be added to the stage show at some point."

== Synopsis ==
The song "beautifully explains what happens when Valjean takes Cosette from the inn and looks after her".

== Composition ==
The song is performed by Jean Valjean, played by Hugh Jackman in the film version. Music is by Claude-Michel Schonberg, while the lyrics are by Herbert Kretzmer and Alain Boublil. A reprise of the song is performed by Marius and Cosette toward the end of the film. The song has been described as "lullaby-like".

== Performance ==
The song and its reprise debuted in the 2012 Tom Hooper-directed adaptation of Les Misérables.

Hugh Jackman performed the song as part of a Les Misérables medley at the 85th Academy Awards.

== Release ==
The song appears only on Les Misérables: Highlights from the Motion Picture Soundtrack.

=== Critical reception ===
Scott Ross of NBC Bay Area said the song "fits seamlessly into the fabric of the musical". The Week said the song was "pretty forgettable compared to the film's more famous songs."

=== Awards and nominations ===
List of awards and nominations
Award	Category	Nominee	Result
Academy Award	Best Original Song	"Suddenly" (music by Claude-Michel Schönberg, lyrics by Herbert Kretzmer and Alain Boublil)	Nominated
Broadcast Film Critics Association Awards	Best Song	"Suddenly"	Nominated
Golden Globe Award	Best Original Song	"Suddenly"	Nominated
Houston Film Critics Society	Best Original Song	"Suddenly"	Won
Satellite Award	Best Original Song	"Suddenly"	Won
