= Les Misérables in Concert: The 25th Anniversary =

- Directed by: Nick Morris; Laurence Connor (stage direction); James Powell (stage direction)
- Based on: Les Misérables by; Alain Boublil; Claude-Michel Schönberg; Les Misérables by Victor Hugo
- Produced by: Cameron Mackintosh; Dionne Orrom; Brett Sullivan
- Starring: Alfie Boe; Norm Lewis; Nick Jonas; Katie Hall; Samantha Barks; Lea Salonga; Matt Lucas; Jenny Galloway; Ramin Karimloo; Hadley Fraser; Earl Carpenter
- Edited by: Marko Keser; Nick Morris; Brett Sullivan
- Music by: Claude-Michel Schönberg
- Production companies: Cameron Mackintosh Ltd. Steam Motion & Sound
- Distributed by: Universal Pictures
- Release date: 3 October 2010
- Running time: 186 minutes
- Country: United Kingdom
- Language: English

Les Misérables in Concert: The 25th Anniversary was performed and filmed at The O2 Arena in North Greenwich, London, England, on 3 October 2010 at 1:30 pm and 7:00 pm. It marked the 25th anniversary of the original West End production of Les Misérables, which was based on Victor Hugo's 1862 novel, and has been running since October 1985.

== Details ==
The 25th anniversary concert stars Alfie Boe as Jean Valjean, Norm Lewis as Javert, Lea Salonga as Fantine, Nick Jonas as Marius Pontmercy, Katie Hall as Cosette, Ramin Karimloo as Enjolras, Samantha Barks as Éponine, Hadley Fraser as Grantaire, Mia Jenkins as Young Cosette, Robert Madge as Gavroche, Matt Lucas and Jenny Galloway as the Thénardiers, and Earl Carpenter as The Bishop of Digne. Originally, Camilla Kerslake had been selected to perform as Cosette; however, she was unable to attend the concert. Hall was selected to play Cosette in her place. She had previously acted as Cosette at the Queen's Theatre from 2009 and in the 25th Anniversary Tour production at the Barbican. Casts of the contemporary London, international tour, and original 1985 London productions took part, comprising an ensemble of three hundred performers and musicians. The orchestra was conducted by David Charles Abell, who also conducted the 10th Anniversary performance in Royal Albert Hall in 1995.

For the encore, four Jean Valjeans sang "Bring Him Home": Colm Wilkinson from the original London cast, John Owen-Jones from the 25th Anniversary touring production, Simon Bowman from the contemporary London cast, and Alfie Boe, who sang the role in the concert. The original 1985 cast (excluding David Burt, who had played Enjolras and states he can no longer sing the part, and Patti LuPone, who originated Fantine but was not in attendance) then led the ensemble in a performance of "One Day More". After speeches from Cameron Mackintosh, Alain Boublil and Claude-Michel Schönberg, the performance concluded with students from school productions of Les Misérables entering the arena through the audience and joining the casts for "The Finale".

The evening concert was shown live in cinemas across the UK, Ireland and around the world. The end credits of the concert confirmed a film adaptation of the stage musical for 2012 release.

A Blu-ray and DVD version of the O2 broadcast was released on 29 November 2010 in the UK (PAL DVD (Region 2) and Blu-ray). It was released in North America on DVD and Blu-ray on 22 February 2011.

The concert first aired on U.S. television as a PBS special on 6 March 2011.

== Cast ==
- Alfie Boe as Jean Valjean
- Norm Lewis as Javert
- Nick Jonas as Marius Pontmercy
- Katie Hall as Cosette
- Samantha Barks as Éponine
- Lea Salonga as Fantine
- Ramin Karimloo as Enjolras
- Matt Lucas as Monsieur Thénardier
- Jenny Galloway as Madame Thénardier
- Hadley Fraser as Grantaire
- Earl Carpenter as The Bishop of Digne

=== Company ===
- Jonathan Williams as Convict/Combeferre
- Nic Greenshields, Tom Pearce, Gerónimo Rauch, Mike Sterling as Convicts
- Tony Whittle as Farmer
- Graham Gill as Labourer
- Vanessa Leagh Hicks as Bishop's Sister/Madame
- Jay Bryce and Rhidian Marc as Constables
- Jeff Nicholson as Factory Foreman
- Gina Beck, Sophia Ragavelas, Jon Robyns, Gemma Wardle, Emma Westhead, Paul Westhead as Factory Workers
- Grainne Renihan as Factory Girl
- Antony Hansen, Jon Lee, Gary Watson as Sailors
- Gillian Budd, Zoe Curlett, Sara Pelosi, Amanda Salmon as Whores
- Rhiannon O'Connor as Old Woman/Old Beggar Woman
- Valda Aviks as Crone
- Peter Polycarpou as Pimp
- Cameron Blakely as Bamatabois
- Jonathan Hart as Paris Pimp
- Lydia Griffiths as Young Prostitute
- Keith Burns as Montparnasse
- Stephen Tate as Babet
- Phil Snowden as Brujon
- Tony Timberlake as Claquesous
- Owain Williams as Feuilly
- Killian Donnelly as Courfeyrac
- Jamie Muscato as Joly
- Edward Baruwa as Legsles
- Alistair Brammer as Jean Prouvaire
- Madalena Alberto, Gina Beck, Rosalind James, Lucie Jones, Sophia Ragavelas, Rebecca Seale, Gemma Wardle as Turning Women
- Chris Key as Warnings
- James Wren as Major Domo

=== Children ===
- Mia Jenkins as Little Cosette
- Chloe Panayi as Little Eponine
- Robert Madge as Gavroche

== See also ==
- Les Misérables (musical)
- Les Misérables: The Dream Cast in Concert
- Les Misérables: The Staged Concert
- Adaptations of Les Misérables
