= The Phantom of the Opera at the Royal Albert Hall =

- Directed by: Nick Morris; Laurence Connor (stage direction)
- Written by: Richard Stilgoe; Andrew Lloyd Webber
- Story by: Gaston Leroux
- Based on: The Phantom of the Opera by Andrew Lloyd Webber; Charles Hart; Richard Stilgoe
- Produced by: Cameron Mackintosh; Dione Orrom; Brett Sullivan
- Starring: Ramin Karimloo; Sierra Boggess; Hadley Fraser; Wendy Ferguson; Barry James; Gareth Snook; Liz Robertson; Daisy Maywood; Wynne Evans; Earl Carpenter
- Edited by: Lawrence Huck; Wes Lipman; Nick Morris; David Tregoning
- Music by: Andrew Lloyd Webber
- Production companies: Really Useful Films; Polydor Records; Steam Motion & Sound
- Distributed by: Universal Pictures UK
- Release date: 2 October 2011
- Running time: 160 minutes
- Country: United Kingdom
- Language: English

The Phantom of the Opera at the Royal Albert Hall is a 2011 British concert film adaptation of the 1986 stage musical The Phantom of the Opera by Andrew Lloyd Webber, itself based on the 1910 novel by Gaston Leroux.

To celebrate the 25th anniversary of the musical, three special performances on Saturday 1 October 2011 at 7.30pm and Sunday 2 October 2011 at 1.30pm and 7.00pm were filmed at the Royal Albert Hall, the third of which was screened live worldwide on 2 October 2011. For further releases, footage from all three performances was edited together.

== Production ==
=== Idea ===
To mark the milestone of 25 years, Andrew Lloyd Webber and Cameron Mackintosh planned a special 3-day production to take place at London's Royal Albert Hall in October 2011.

Designer Matt Kinley initially planned to hold a concert-style production not unlike the Les Misérables 25th anniversary concert at the O2 Arena, but Mackintosh made it clear the show would be fully staged, as both he and Lloyd Webber felt it would not work unless it were the whole show. As a result, the event was planned as a full show.

=== Royal Albert Hall ===
Designing the staged show at the Royal Albert Hall was a daunting task, as the available space was not easy to translate a proscenium show. As a concert hall rather than a theatre, many of the show's elements, such as the chandelier (which, instead of falling, exploded), were to be toned down and simplified: the Royal Albert Hall was not capable of accepting a show the size of The Phantom of the Opera, or at least not the full original.

The balconies of the hall were used to build uprights to form an opera house proscenium with boxes on each side. The orchestra was elevated on a platform and backed by a screen on which the opera sets were projected, with LED screens on the lower portions of the performance stage.

=== Live streaming ===
Tickets for the three performances sold out within five hours of going on sale. In order to enable more people to see the production, the final performance was relayed live to cinemas around the world via Fathom Events.

== Plot ==
=== Prologue ===
In 1905 Paris, at an auction hosted by the defunct Opéra Populaire, the Vicomte Raoul de Chagny purchases a music box that an unknown woman told him about, noting it appears as she described it. The auctioneer presents a restored chandelier as the next item up for bid, noting its link to "the strange affair of the Phantom of the Opera." As the mammoth fixture comes to life, the theatre's former grandeur returns ("Overture").

=== Act I ===
In 1881, the Opéra Populaire's retiring owner, Lefevre, interrupts rehearsals for the grand opera Hannibal to introduce the company to his successors, Richard Firmin and Gilles André ("Hannibal Rehearsal"). When a falling backdrop barely misses resident soprano Carlotta Giudicelli, everyone blames "The Phantom of the Opera," who has troubled them for the past three years. The new managers attempt to downplay the situation, but Carlotta refuses to perform and walks out. As Lefevre departs, Meg Giry, the daughter of ballet mistress Madame Giry, claims her friend Christine Daaé has been taking singing lessons from an unknown teacher and can sing in Carlotta's place. André identifies the name as the same as a prominent deceased violinist, who Christine reveals was her father. The managers, realising that they have no other alternative, let Christine audition and find themselves dazzled by her exceptional voice. That night, Christine makes a triumphant stage début, during which Raoul de Chagny, the Opéra's new patron, recognises her from his youth ("Think of Me").

Following the performance, Christine reveals to Meg that her teacher is an invisible angel her father told her about in stories ("Angel of Music"). She then receives a surprise visit from Raoul in her dressing room, where they reminisce about their first meeting and their time as playmates. Christine tells him about her lessons with the Angel of Music, to which he responds by indulging in what he assumes are fantasies and inviting her to dinner ("Little Lotte"). The moment he leaves to fetch his hat, Christine hears a jealous voice condemn Raoul for intruding. Believing it to be the Angel, she begs him to show himself to her. A ghostly, partially masked face appears in her mirror, revealing that the Phantom has been masquerading as the Angel of Music, and commands her to walk through it ("The Mirror (Angel of Music [Reprise])"). The two descend into the Opéra's cellars and take a gondola across a subterranean lake to the Phantom's lair ("The Phantom of the Opera"). Once there, the Phantom tells Christine he has chosen her to sing his music. She becomes overwhelmed and faints, prompting the Phantom to carry her to a bed ("The Music of the Night").

Sometime later, as the Phantom composes at his organ, Christine wakes and, overcome with curiosity, sneaks up behind him and tears off his mask ("I Remember"). He flies into a rage, declaring she will be his prisoner, but then expresses his yearning to live an ordinary life and experience love ("Stranger Than You Dreamt It"). Christine returns his mask to him, and he decides to take her back to the Opéra. Meanwhile, chief stagehand Joseph Buquet tells Meg and the other chorus girls to beware of the Phantom's Punjab lasso, to which Madame Giry offers an ominous warning ("Magical Lasso").

In the managers' office, Raoul interrupts André and Firmin as they compare dispatches from the Phantom, asking them if they sent him a message warning him not to see Christine again. Carlotta then enters with her lover Ubaldo Piangi in tow and accuses Raoul of sending her a threatening letter. Finally, Madame Giry arrives with another dispatch from the Phantom: unless Christine plays the lead in the new production of Il Muto, a disaster "beyond imagination" will occur ("Notes"). The managers assure Carlotta she is and always will be the star ("Prima Donna").

That night, Carlotta appears in the leading role while Raoul watches the performance from Box Five, which usually is kept empty for the Phantom's use. The Phantom causes chaos by reducing the diva's voice to a frog-like croak after she refers to Christine as a "little toad." After Firmin announces Christine will take her place, the chorus performs a ballet from the opera's third act to keep the audience entertained. Further mayhem ensues, however, when Buquet's corpse suddenly drops from the rafters, hanging from the Punjab lasso ("Poor Fool, He Makes Me Laugh").

Christine and Raoul flee to the roof, where she tells him about the Phantom and her journey to his lair ("Why Have You Brought Me Here?/Raoul, I've Been There"). Despite his scepticism, Raoul sees she believes her fear to be real and makes a vow to love and protect her no matter what happens, which she reciprocates ("All I Ask of You"). The Phantom, having eavesdropped on their conversation, vows revenge and destroys the chandelier during the curtain call ("All I Ask of You [Reprise]").

=== Act II ===
Six months later, during a New Year's Eve masked ball, the Phantom appears in costume as the Red Death and announces he has written an opera entitled Don Juan Triumphant. He demands that the company produce it with Christine, now secretly engaged to Raoul, as the leading female role, warning that dire consequences will occur if anyone fails to obey his instructions. He then vanishes in a blinding flash of light but not before declaring Christine belongs to him ("Masquerade/Why So Silent"). As the guests panic, Raoul confronts Madame Giry, claiming that she knows about the Phantom. She reveals the Phantom is a terrifyingly disfigured prodigy she saw years before at a traveling fair, where he was kept on display in a locked cage until he escaped.

As the managers reluctantly prepare to produce Don Juan, Carlotta accuses Christine of orchestrating the entire affair, to which Christine protests that she had no knowledge of the plot. Madame Giry arrives with a dispatch bearing cutting instructions for Carlotta, Piangi, and the managers and ominous directions for Christine. When she finishes reading it, Raoul, knowing of the Phantom's obsession with his fiancée, decides to use the premiere to capture him and bring an end to his reign of terror. He begs a reluctant Christine to help, but she refuses ("Notes/Twisted Every Way").

Following a disastrous rehearsal session, Christine visits her father's grave, where she expresses her longing for his guidance and her understanding she must move on from his death ("Wishing You Were Somehow Here Again"). The Phantom appears under the guise of the Angel of Music and attempts to cause the weary Christine to succumb to his influence as Raoul arrives to rescue her ("Wandering Child"). When Raoul breaks the hypnotic spell at the last minute, the Phantom begins creating pillars of fire to taunt him. The couple flees the cemetery as the enraged Phantom sets it ablaze, declaring war upon them both. ("Bravo, Monsieur").

Don Juan Triumphant premieres with Christine and Piangi in the lead roles and armed policemen standing guard. During a duet, Christine realises that she is singing with the Phantom ("Don Juan Triumphant/The Point of No Return"). When he expresses his love for her, mimicking's Raoul vow of devotion, she tears off his mask and exposes his face to the audience. The Phantom proceeds to spirit Christine offstage as the Opéra descends into chaos over the discovery of Piangi's garrotted corpse. While an angry mob forms and vows vengeance, Madame Giry tells Raoul how to find the Phantom's lair ("Down Once More/Track Down This Murderer").

In the lair, after finding herself forced into a wedding dress, Christine tells the Phantom she is afraid not of his physical appearance but of his bestial inner nature. Raoul reaches the lair's entrance and begs the Phantom to spare her. He responds by trapping him in the Punjab lasso and threatens to kill him unless Christine promises to stay with him ("The Point of No Return [Reprise]"). Both men vie for her as she struggles to make a decision. Finally, she expresses her sadness over the life the Phantom has lived and shows him compassion for the first time in his life with a kiss.

The Phantom, realising he cannot compel Christine to love him, sets the couple free. He yells for them to leave and swear never to reveal his existence to anyone. Christine gives him back his ring as he tells her he loves her. Christine tearfully exits with Raoul but not before turning back for one last look. Hearing the angry mob closing in, the Phantom huddles on his throne beneath his cloak just as Meg enters. She approaches the throne and pulls it away, finding only the Phantom's mask ("Finale").

== Grand Finale ==
Following the bows, Andrew Lloyd Webber delivers a speech to the audience before bringing out both the Royal Albert Hall and the original creative team, the original leads from the London and Broadway productions, and the original London cast, including Michael Crawford and Sarah Brightman. Brightman then sings "The Phantom of the Opera" with Colm Wilkinson, Anthony Warlow, Peter Jöback, and John Owen-Jones. Karimloo joins the four Phantoms in singing "The Music of the Night," along with both casts and creative teams.

== Cast ==
- Ramin Karimloo as The Phantom of the Opera
- Sierra Boggess as Christine Daaé
- Hadley Fraser as Raoul, Vicomte de Chagny
- Wendy Ferguson as Carlotta Giudicelli
- Barry James as Monsieur Richard Firmin
- Gareth Snook as Monsieur Gilles André
- Liz Robertson as Madame Giry
- Daisy Maywood as Meg Giry
- Wynne Evans as Ubaldo Piangi
- Nick Holder as Joseph Buquet
- Earl Carpenter as The Auctioneer
- Rosemary Ashe as Confidante
- Garðar Thór Cortes as Passarino

Principal understudies Simon Shorten and Katie Hall play the Phantom and Christine in "The Phantom of the Opera" sequence when they walk on a lowering walkway that simulates a descent to the Phantom's underground lair. In the DVD, Blu-Ray, and digital download release of the concert, a footage of Boggess as Christine singing the song on the walkway was shot on one rehearsal and added in the film's final cut.

== Home media ==
The production was recorded live and later released on Blu-ray, DVD, CD and digital download. The initial releases were in the UK on 14 November 2011. The digital download format was released three days earlier on 11 November. The North American release followed on 7 February 2012. The production was also aired as free viewing for all during the COVID-19 pandemic on 18–19 April 2020 via The Shows Must Go On channel on YouTube as part of a series of weekly musicals by Andrew Lloyd Webber. It was aired again in November due to popular demand. The production can also be rented or bought on Google Play, Amazon's Prime Video, and BroadwayHD.
