= Rachel Barrell =

British stage performer and singer

Rachel Barrell (born 1980) is a British stage performer and singer known best for playing Christine, the female lead in the West End production of The Phantom of the Opera, from September 2004 until October 2006. She played the role opposite long-running London Phantoms, John Owen-Jones, and Earl Carpenter. She also performed for the show's 18th and 20th anniversaries.

In February 2007 she played young Sally in a special charity performance of Follies. Rachel has also previously performed in the musicals Thoroughly Modern Millie, Beauty and the Beast, and Sweeney Todd. She also runs a dance school in Hertfordshire.

She currently runs a youth theatre company in Hertfordshire called “spotlight”, along with her husband.
