= Colm Wilkinson =

Irish singer and actor (born 1944)

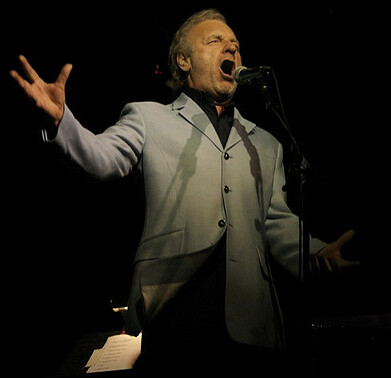
- Wilkinson performing in 2007 in Ontario, Canada

Background information
- Also known as: C. T. Wilkinson
- Born: 5 June 1944 (age 82); Drimnagh, Ireland
- Genres: Rock opera; Broadway theatre; musical theatre; folk rock
- Occupations: Singer; actor
- Years active: 1972–present
- Website: colmwilkinson.com

Colm Wilkinson (born 5 June 1944), also known as C. T. Wilkinson, is an Irish singer and actor who is best known for originating the lead role of Jean Valjean in Les Misérables (in the West End and Broadway) and for creating the title role in The Phantom of the Opera (1985) preview at the Sydmonton Festival and later reprising his role in the original Canadian production.

Due to his association with these musicals, he reprised the role of Jean Valjean during the Les Misérables 10th Anniversary Concert (at The Royal Albert Hall), as well as appearing as a special guest at the Les Misérables 25th Anniversary Concert at the O2 Arena and The Phantom of the Opera at the Royal Albert Hall.

His versions of both "The Music of the Night" from Phantom and "Bring Him Home" from Les Misérables are acclaimed throughout the world; fans "insist he perform them...at all his concerts."

== Early life ==
Born in Drimnagh, in 1944, in the downstairs room of his parents' house, Wilkinson was one of ten children. He recalls a home that resonated with singing, poetry, and musical instruments. Both of his parents were skilled musicians. His mother, a native of Crossmolina in County Mayo, was a singer, and was involved in amateur dramatics, while the banjo and mandolin formed part of his father's extensive repertoire. Wilkinson worked with his father, who was an asphalt contractor, and was playing in bands part-time. At 16 years of age, he went to the US on a tour, and soon after quit the family business to become a full-time professional musician.

== Life and career ==
=== Early career ===
After playing in several Irish bands which included The Action (not to be confused with an English band of the same name), in 1972, Wilkinson was cast as Judas Iscariot in the Dublin production of Andrew Lloyd Webber's Jesus Christ Superstar; he went on to reprise the role in London and on the British national tour.

In 1976, Wilkinson sang the part of Che on concept album for the musical Evita. Instead of auditioning for the role when the production was launched in London, Wilkinson launched a solo career as a singer-songwriter.

Wilkinson starred in Voices, a musical based on the life and times of Joan of Arc, which went on stage at the Olympia Dublin in 1984. The show's music and lyrics were written by Derry-based composer, Tommy "TC" Doherty, with the single "Child of Destiny" being released at the time and now available on iTunes.

=== The Phantom of the Opera ===
In 1985, he collaborated with Andrew Lloyd Webber once again, originating the role of The Phantom in The Phantom of the Opera at the Sydmonton workshop. Wilkinson was offered the role for the show's debut on the West End, but instead chose to play Jean Valjean in Les Misérables.

In 1989, Wilkinson relocated his family to Toronto, Ontario, Canada, when he was offered the title role in the original Toronto production of The Phantom of the Opera playing at the Pantages Theatre (now Ed Mirvish Theatre). He has lived in Toronto ever since, and became a Canadian citizen in the early 2000s. In 1992, an arbitrator for Actor's Equity found that Wilkinson had used "excessive roughness" on his Phantom co-star Rebecca Caine, based on her testimony and witness accounts that he had repeatedly hurt her onstage and once severely sprained her wrist, which had to be put in a brace, resulting in her dismissal from the show.

On 1 and 2 October 2011, he appeared – alongside a number of former Phantoms – at the 25th Anniversary Celebration of The Phantom of the Opera, at The Royal Albert Hall.

=== Les Misérables ===
The London production of Les Misérables opened in October 1985, and transferred to Broadway in March 1987. Originally, the American Actors' Equity Association refused to allow Wilkinson to play the part of Valjean in New York, due to its strict policy of hiring only American actors unless an actor outside America was an international star. At this, producer Cameron Mackintosh refused to open the show unless Wilkinson played Valjean, and Actors' Equity relented. Wilkinson took the lead role despite the temporary setback. He won the Helen Hayes Award, the Outer Critics Circle Award, and the Theatre World Award for his performance; he was nominated for the Tony Award and Drama Desk Award for Best Actor in a Musical.

In 1995, Wilkinson played Jean Valjean in the 10th Anniversary Concert of Les Misérables at the Royal Albert Hall.

From August 1998 through January 1999, Wilkinson played Valjean once again, this time in Toronto at the Princess of Wales Theatre. Not long afterwards, he returned to the role of Valjean in Dublin, Ireland at the Point Theatre between February, 1999 and May, 1999. From June, 2002 to July, 2002 he again reprised the role in Shanghai at the Shanghai Grand Theatre.

On 3 October 2010, Wilkinson was a special guest at the 25th Anniversary Concerts of Les Misérables, at the O2 Arena, alongside many other original cast members. He performed as part of a "Valjean Quartet"; alongside Alfie Boe, John Owen-Jones and Simon Bowman (each of whom had previously played the role of Jean Valjean in various productions of Les Misérables). This was recorded as a single (released in the U.K.) and performed live at the London Palladium; during the Royal Variety Performance on 16 December 2010.

Wilkinson appeared as the Bishop of Digne in the 2012 film production of Les Misérables. He reprised this role in a performance of the musical in Toronto in January 2014 where Ramin Karimloo played Valjean.

=== Later career ===
His support of PBS and listener-supported television in North America, following his participation in the tenth anniversary of the production of Les Misérables, brought him an hour-long program on which he performed songs including some selections from the album and a rendition of "Gethsemane", from Jesus Christ Superstar, a song that he admitted having hoped to perform for 23 years. His supporting television broadcast, Stage Heroes: Colm Wilkinson, aired on the heels of Les Misérables, brought positive reviews from fans and critic.

In October–November 2007, Wilkinson undertook a cross-Canada concert tour, Broadway and Beyond, along with Susan Gilmour and Gretha Boston.

Wilkinson plays the part of Lord Darcy in the third season showing of Showtime's miniseries The Tudors which began airing on 12 April 2009.

He participated in U.S. Senator Ted Kennedy's birthday celebration at the Kennedy Center in Washington, D.C., on 8 March 2009. The highlight of the evening was when President Barack Obama arrived on the stage and together with all the performers sang "Happy Birthday" to Ted Kennedy. Wilkinson also was asked to perform at the John F. Kennedy Memorial Library at the Memorial Service for Senator Kennedy on 28 August 2009, the evening before the Senator's funeral.

On 24 May 2009, Wilkinson performed in the National Memorial Day Concert at the Capitol building in Washington, D.C., in front of a large audience and screened live across America on PBS.

He is a Founding Artist of Theatre 20, a musical theatre company in Toronto formed by artists in 2009, and performed in Theatre 20's 2011 Concert Series at the Panasonic Theatre. Other Founding Artists include Susan Gilmour, Louise Pitre, Ma-Anne Dionisio, Tamara Bernier Evans and Adam Brazier.

Wilkinson was voted one of the five greatest singers ever in a Rolling Stone Magazine readers' poll and is noted for maintaining a powerful singing voice into his late 60s. He has attributed his longevity to avoiding coffee, alcohol, cigarettes, and dairy products, as well as ensuring proper sleep, diet, and exercise. He is also noted as being rather soft-spoken in order to refrain from overworking his voice.

=== Recordings ===
In 1977, Wilkinson released an eponymous album in Ireland, where he was known as "C.T. Wilkinson". The album charted in the Irish Charts for eight weeks at Number 1.

After the success of solo LP, Wilkinson began to prepare actively for vocal competitions. This led to his eventual representation of Ireland in the Eurovision Song Contest in 1978 with "Born to Sing", earning fifth place in the European competition for his efforts.

Wilkinson featured as Dr. Jekyll/Mr. Hyde in the original Jekyll and Hyde concept album released in 1990.

A solo album was released in January 2010 titled Broadway and Beyond: The Concert Songs. It covers all of the songs that Wilkinson performed on his cross-Canada tour in 2007. His previous album was released in 2002, titled "Some of My Best Friends Are Songs". In it, he and his son Aaron cover the Cat Stevens song, "Father and Son", as a duet. The album is a mix of show tunes, Wilkinson's personal favorites, and several songs from his stage productions.

== Personal life ==
In 1970, Wilkinson married Deirdre, whom he describes as a source of constant and essential support over the past four decades. They started their life as a married couple in Bray in 1970, and went on to have four children – Aaron, Judith, Sarah, and Simon. They have a home in Wicklow, yet now live mainly in Canada. The family moved to Toronto in 1989 when Wilkinson began a four-and-a-half-year run at the Pantages Theatre as the title character of The Phantom of the Opera, originating the role in Canada. Of their children, Judith is now a curator, Simon and Sarah are graphic designers and Aaron is a singer/songwriter. Early in his music career, Wilkinson insisted that his wife and children accompany him on tour to avoid familial separation.

== Discography ==
Solo albums

- Colm C.T. Wilkinson (1977)
- Stage Heroes (1989)
- Some Of My Best Friends Are Songs (2002)
- Broadway and Beyond: The Concert Songs (2010)

Cast albums

- Evita (1976)
- Les Miserables (1985 London Cast)
- Les Misérables (1987 Broadway Cast)
- Highlights From Jekyll and Hyde (1990)
- Phantom of the Opera (1990 Canadian Cast)

== Filmography ==
Year	Title	Role	Notes
1985	Lyrics by Tim Rice	Che	Segment "High Flying, Adored"
1995	Les Misérables: The Dream Cast in Concert	Jean Valjean	
2009–2010	The Tudors	Thomas Darcy, 1st Baron Darcy de Darcy	3 episodes
2010	Les Misérables: 25th Anniversary Concert	Jean Valjean	Finale – Special Guest
2011	The Phantom of the Opera at the Royal Albert Hall	The Phantom	Finale – Special Guest
2012	Les Misérables	The Bishop of Digne	National Board of Review Award for Best Cast; Satellite Award for Best Cast – Motion Picture; Washington, D.C., Area Film Critics Association Award for Best Ensemble; Nominated—Broadcast Film Critics Association Award for Best Acting Ensemble; Nominated—Phoenix Film Critics Society Award for Best Cast; Nominated—San Diego Film Critics Society Award for Best Performance by an Ensemble; Nominated—Screen Actors Guild Award for Outstanding Performance by a Cast in a Motion Picture

== Honours ==
- (Republic of Ireland) He was awarded the Gold Medal of Honorary Patronage by the Philosophical Society of Trinity College Dublin in 2018.

=== Honorary degrees ===
Honorary degrees

Location	Date	School	Degree	Gave Commencement Address
Ontario	October 2012	Ryerson University	Doctor of Laws (LL.D)	Yes

Awards and achievements
Preceded by The Swarbriggs Plus Two with "It's Nice to Be in Love Again"	Ireland in the Eurovision Song Contest; 1978	Succeeded by Cathal Dunne with "Happy Man"
