= Hadley Fraser =

English actor, singer (born 1980)

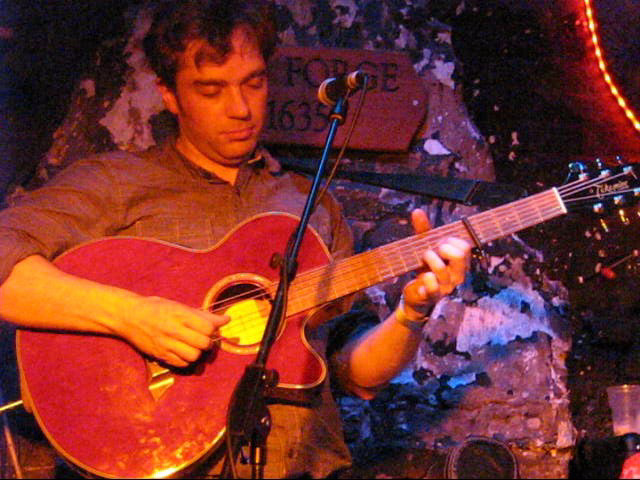
- Fraser in 2013
- Born: Robert Hugh Fraser; April 21, 1980 (age 46); Windsor, Berkshire, England
- Occupations: Actor; singer; songwriter
- Years active: 1998–present
- Known for: Les Misérables; The Pirate Queen; The Phantom of the Opera at the Royal Albert Hall
- Spouse: Rosalie Craig (m. 2014)
- Children: 1

Hadley Fraser (born Robert Hugh Fraser, April 21, 1980) is an English actor and singer. He made his West End debut as Marius Pontmercy in Les Misérables. He also originated the role of Tiernan for his Broadway debut in The Pirate Queen.

Fraser’s other West End credits include Inspector Javert in Les Misérables, Frederick Frankenstein in Young Frankenstein, Anatoly Sergievsky in Chess, Archibald Craven in The Secret Garden, and many others. He also played Raoul de Chagny in The Phantom of the Opera at the Royal Albert Hall, Grantaire in Les Misérables in Concert: The 25th Anniversary, and Billy Bigelow in Carousel at Cadogan Hall.

== Early life and education ==
Fraser was born in Windsor, Berkshire. He holds a BA from Birmingham University and a Postgraduate Diploma from the Royal Academy of Music. In 2011, he was made an Associate of the Royal Academy of Music, or ARAM.

== Personal life ==
On 5 October 2014, Hadley married his partner, actress Rosalie Craig. The couple have a daughter, born in 2016.

== Career ==
Fraser has performed in a number of West End productions and played Gareth in the Doctor Who episode "Army of Ghosts" (2006).

In 2009, Fraser played the recurring role of Reed in The Fresh Beat Band season 1; in the last 2 seasons, he was replaced by Patrick Levis. In May 2010, he returned to the West End to play the role of El Gallo in The Fantasticks.

In October 2010, Fraser sang the Les Misérables role of Grantaire in the 25th Anniversary concert in the West End.

On 23 June 2011, Fraser returned to the West End production of Les Misérables, this time to play the role of Javert. He received critical acclaim for the role and remained with the show until June 2012.

On 1 and 2 October 2011, Fraser played Raoul in the 25th anniversary staging of The Phantom of the Opera at the Royal Albert Hall in London. He appeared alongside Ramin Karimloo and Sierra Boggess, who played the Phantom and Christine respectively. Fraser also co-starred with Karimloo in the 25th Anniversary concert of Les Misérables and they both made their West End debuts in the show in 2002 where Karimloo understudied Fraser. Hadley has written music for a band called "Sheytoons" with Karimloo, including "Heading West" and "Driftwood".

Fraser appeared in the film adaptation of Les Misérables as the Army General of the National Guard.

In 2012, Fraser sang "Beyond the Door" on the concept album for The In-Between, as the character of Calicus.

Fraser appeared with Tom Hiddleston in the Donmar Warehouse's production of Coriolanus from 6 December 2013 to 13 February 2014.

In December 2014, he returned to the Donmar Warehouse to play Stine in City of Angels, alongside his wife Rosalie Craig as Gabby/Bobbi and Samantha Barks as Mallory/Avril.

An avid musician as well, Fraser can be heard on Scott Alan's releases Keys and Scott Alan LIVE, as well as his own EP, "Just Let Go", released in August 2014 via social media and digital download (no hardcopy has been released).

He was the co-lyricist and co-book writer (with Josie Rourke) for the verbatim musical Committee... (full title The Public Administration and Constitutional Affairs Committee Takes Oral Evidence on Whitehall's Relationship with Kids Company) with music by Tom Deering, which premiered at the Donmar Warehouse from 23 June to 12 August 2017.

He played Frederick Frankenstein in the UK premiere of the musical Young Frankenstein in August 2017, at the Garrick Theatre in London's West End, following a tryout run at the Theatre Royal, Newcastle. In May 2019, he played Billy Bigelow in a concert of Carousel.

In 2022, he received high praise for his performance as Anatoly Sergeivesky in a West End concert run of Chess. He also played Archibald Craven in a concert of The Secret Garden opposite Mark Feehily as his brother Neville.

In 2024, Fraser played the role of Manny in the new musical Opening Night at the Gielgud Theatre in London's West End. On 4 June 2024, it was announced that Dirty Rotten Scoundrels would return to the West End for a concert run at the London Palladium on 24 November 2024, marking 20 years since the show premiered. Fraser is set to star as Lawrence Jamieson opposite Ramin Karimloo as Freddy Benson.

In 2025, Fraser played the role of the Good King in the live-action remake, Snow White.

== Acting credits ==
=== Film and television ===
List of Hadley Fraser film and television credits
Year	Title	Role	Notes
2006	Doctor Who	Gareth	TV series (Army of Ghosts)
2009–2010	The Fresh Beat Band	Reed	TV series – 13 episodes in season 1
2010	The Lost Tribe	Chris	
2010	Les Misérables: 25th Anniversary Concert	Grantaire	Live concert at The O2
2011	Convincing Clooney	Chris	
2011	The Phantom of the Opera at the Royal Albert Hall	Viscount Raoul de Chagny	Live adaptation of the musical
2012	Shackled	Jesse	Short film
2012	Les Misérables	National Guardsman	
2014	Coriolanus	Tullus Aufidius	National Theatre Live
2014	The Wrong Mans	MI5 Agent	TV Series
2014	Sons of Liberty	John Dickinson	TV Series
2014	Pompidou	Maitre D'	TV Series
2015	Holby City	Sebastian Coulter	TV Series
2016	The Legend of Tarzan	Tarzan's father	
2017	Murder on the Orient Express	British Military Escort	
2018	All Is True	Shakespeare's son-in-law	
2022	Gentleman Jack	M. Bradley	
2023	The Gold	DC John Fordham	TV Series
2025	Snow White	Good King	

=== Theatre ===
List of Hadley Fraser theatre credits
Year	Title	Role	Theatre	Location
1998	Jesus Christ Superstar	Judas Iscariot	Birmingham University	Birmingham
1999	West Side Story	Riff	Birmingham University	Birmingham
2002	Little Shop of Horrors	Seymour Krelborn	Northampton Derngate	Northampton
2002–2003	Les Misérables	Marius Pontmercy	Palace Theatre	West End
2003–2004	Peter Pan	Curly	Savoy Theatre	West End
2003–2004	The Pirates of Penzance	Frederic	Savoy Theatre	West End
2004	The Shaughraun	Captain Molineaux	Abbey Theatre	Dublin
2004	Putting It Together	Young Man	Harrogate Theatre	Harrogate
2005	The Far Pavilions	Ashton Pelham-Martyn	Shaftesbury Theatre	West End
2005	Longitude	William Harrison	Greenwich Theatre	Off-West End
2006	Assassins	John Wilkes Booth	Sheffield Crucible	Sheffield
2006	Pacific Overtures	Kayama Yasaemon	Leicester Haymarket	Leicester
2006	My Fair Lady	Freddy Eynsford-Hill	Larnaca Amphitheatre	Cyprus
2006–2007	The Pirate Queen	Tiernan	Cadillac Palace & Hilton Theatre	Chicago & Broadway
2007	The Last Five Years	Jamie Wellerstein	Theatre Aspen	Colorado
2009	A Christmas Carol	Bob Cratchit	Birmingham Repertory Theatre	Birmingham
2010	The Fantasticks	El Gallo	Duchess Theatre	West End
2010	Les Misérables	Grantaire	O2 Arena	London
2011–2012	Les Misérables	Inspector Javert	Queen's Theatre	West End
2011	The Phantom of the Opera at the Royal Albert Hall	Raoul, Vicomte de Chagny	Royal Albert Hall	London
2013	The Pajama Game	Sid Sorokin	Chichester Minerva Theatre	Chichester
2013	The Machine	Garry Kasparov	M.I.F. and Park Avenue Armoury	New York City
2013–2014	Coriolanus	Tullus Aufidius	Donmar Warehouse	Off-West End
2014–2015	City of Angels	Stine	Donmar Warehouse	Off-West End
2015	The Vote	Alastair Swift	Donmar Warehouse	Off-West End
2015	Of Thee I Sing	President John P. Wintergreen	Royal Festival Hall	London
2015	The Winter's Tale	Polixenes	Garrick Theatre	West End
2015–2016	Harlequinade	First Halberdier	Garrick Theatre	West End
2016	Long Day's Journey Into Night	James Tyrone Jr	Bristol Old Vic	Bristol
2017	Committee...(a new musical)	co-lyricist and co-book writer	Donmar Warehouse	Off-West End
2017	Saint Joan	Dunois	Donmar Warehouse	Off-West End
2017–2018	Young Frankenstein	Dr. Frederick Frankenstein	Newcastle Theatre Royal & Garrick Theatre	Newcastle & West End
2019	Carousel	Billy Bigelow	Cadogan Hall	London
2019	The Deep Blue Sea	Freddie Page	Chichester Minerva Theatre	Chichester
2019	The Antipodes		Dorfman Theatre (National Theatre)	London
2020	City of Angels	Stine	Garrick Theatre	West End
2021	2:22 A Ghost Story	Sam	Noël Coward Theatre	West End
2022	Chess	Anatoly Sergievsky	Theatre Royal Drury Lane	West End
2022	The Secret Garden	Lord Archibald Craven	The London Palladium	West End
2023	The Lehman Trilogy	Mayer Lehman	Gillian Lynne Theatre	West End
2024	Opening Night	Manny	Gielgud Theatre	West End
2024	Dirty Rotten Scoundrels	Lawrence Jameson	London Palladium	West End
2025	The Deep Blue Sea	Freddie Page	Theatre Royal Haymarket	West End
2025	Dirty Rotten Scoundrels	Lawrence Jameson	Tokyu Theatre Orb	Tokyo, Japan
2026	Magic	Harry Houdini	Chichester Festival Theatre	Chichester
2026	My Fair Lady	Henry Higgins	Chichester Festival Theatre	Chichester

== Discography ==
Just Let Go

- Released: Pre-Release 21 Aug 14
- Format: Digital EP
- Writer: Hadley Fraser
- Tracks: "Just Let Go", "Heading West", "Herne and the Red Kite", "But For Me", "On Constellation Street"
