= Erik (The Phantom of the Opera) =

- The Phantom of the Opera character
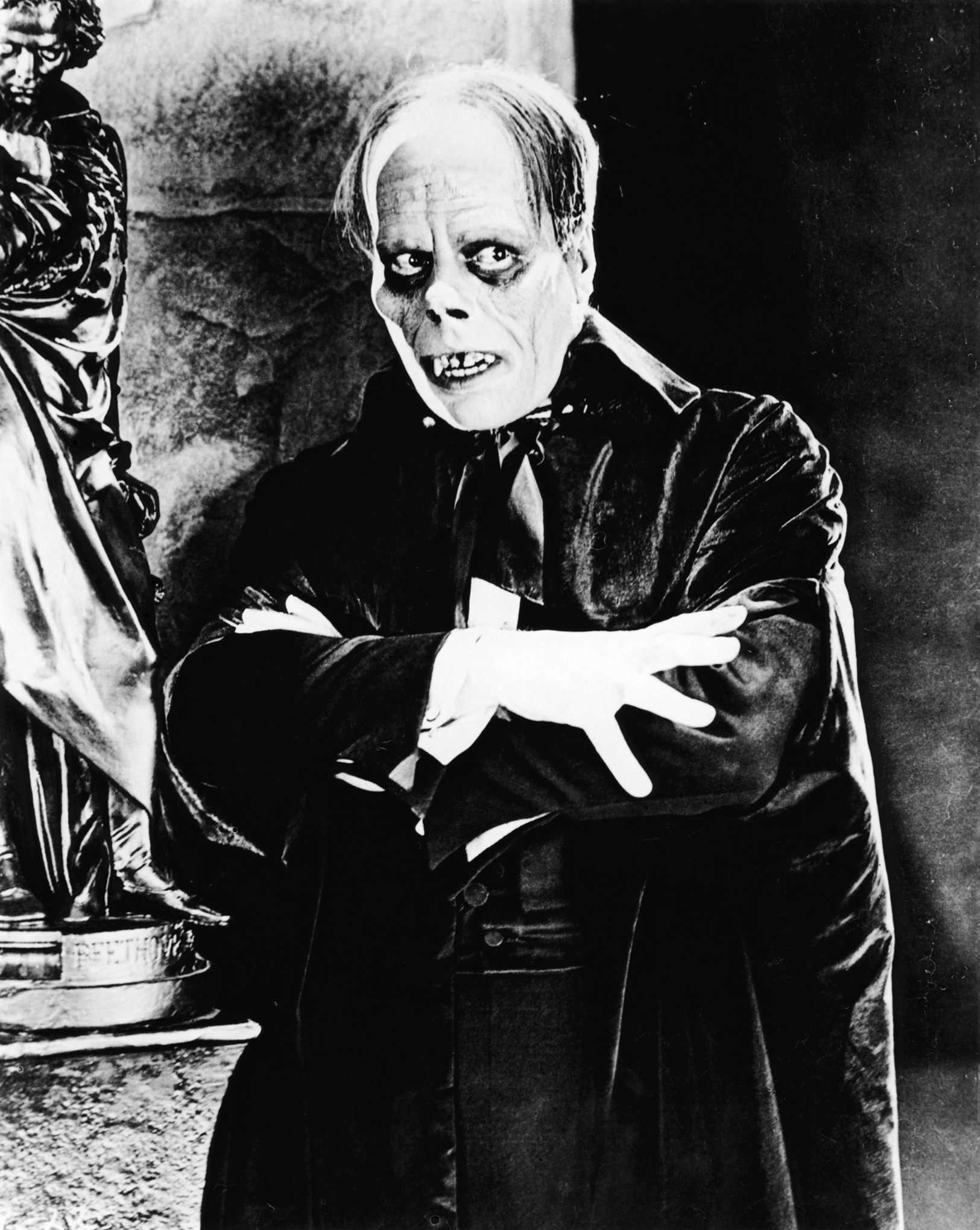
- Lon Chaney as Erik, The Phantom, in Universal's 1925 silent film adaptation of The Phantom of the Opera
- First appearance: The Phantom of the Opera (1909)
- Created by: Gaston Leroux

In-universe information
- Aliases: The Phantom of the Opera; Opera Ghost; The Angel of Music
- Species: Human
- Gender: Male
- Occupation: Musician, composer.
- Nationality: French

Erik (additionally known as the Phantom of the Opera, commonly referred to as the Phantom) is the titular central character of Gaston Leroux's Le Fantôme de l'Opéra, best known to English speakers as The Phantom of the Opera. The character has been adapted to alternative media several times, including in the 1925 film adaptation starring Lon Chaney, the 1943 remake starring Claude Rains, the 1962 remake starring Herbert Lom and Andrew Lloyd Webber's musical.

== Character history ==
In the original novel, few details are given regarding Erik's past. The novel confirms that Erik has traveled to multiple countries including France, Russia, Persia and northern Vietnam, learning various arts and sciences from each region. Erik himself laments the fact that his mother was horrified by his birth deformity and that his father, a master construction mason, never saw him. Most of the character's history is revealed by a mysterious figure, known through most of the novel as The Persian or the Daroga, who saved Erik's life in Persia, and followed Erik to Paris; other details are discussed in the novel's epilogue (e.g., his birthplace is given as a small town outside of Rouen, France). In the novel, Erik often refers to himself in the third person, a detail omitted in subsequent adaptations.

=== Kay's Phantom ===
Many different versions of Erik's life are told through other adaptations such as films, television shows, books and musicals. One such popular literary adaptation is the Susan Kay novel Phantom (1990), a fictional in-depth story of Erik from the time of his birth to the end of his life at the Paris Opera House.

For the most part, Kay's novel stays in context with Erik's life history as laid down by Leroux. However, Kay (as explained in her Author's Note) changes and shapes the character to match her own vision, influenced by other adaptations besides the original. In addition, the ending/resolution is quite different from Leroux's. The story follows Erik through his entire life, starting with the night of his birth, and is told from different viewpoints throughout the novel (Erik's mother, Erik, Nadir/the Persian, Christine, and Raoul). Kay places the highest priority on portraying romantic aspects of Erik's life.

=== Yeston and Kopit's Phantom ===
The theatrical team of Maury Yeston (Music and Lyrics) and Arthur Kopit (Book) created a musical based on the novel, Phantom, which investors backed out of after Webber's version became a huge hit. In this version, Erik has spent his entire life living beneath the Opera. Over the years, he became possessive of the Opera, and the creative driving force for the company. All artistic decisions are made by him, with the cooperation and assistance of Gerard Carriere, who is his only contact with the outside world.

He offers to teach Christine Daaé to sing after hearing her working in the costume shop, and falls in love with her.

This storyline was also the basis for the 1990 miniseries starring Charles Dance, Teri Polo, and Burt Lancaster as Carriere. and the show has received over 1000 theatrical productions worldwide.

=== The Canary Trainer ===
In Nicholas Meyer's 1993 novel The Canary Trainer, Sherlock Holmes develops several theories as to the Phantom's identity:

- Holmes first idea is that the Phantom is an employee of the Opera; however, when the Phantom's knowledge of the Opera becomes evident, Holmes then believes that he is Charles Garnier, having faked his own death. However, Garnier's corpse is conclusively identified.
- Holmes then theorizes that the Phantom was Edouard LaFosse, Garnier's (fictional) assistant, who designed much of the Opera's interior and who allegedly died after a building collapse. Holmes theorizes that he did not die, but was merely disfigured and therefore took to hiding in the Opera.
- When Holmes finally confronts the Phantom, however, he denies that he is Edouard LaFosse.

Holmes therefore admits that he is not sure how true any of the theories or claims of the Phantom's identity are. The Phantom never provides a given name in the novel; he only tells Christine that his name is "Nobody".

Regardless of his identity, the Phantom in The Canary Trainer is much more unhinged and bloodthirsty than in the original novel or play: for example, when killing Madame Giry's replacement with the chandelier, he kills "almost thirty men and women in the twinkling of an eye", just to ensure that he kills his main target.

The Phantom is also more psychologically disturbed, to the extent that he tells Holmes that he has been "taught" not to speak without his mask, as his mother forced him to wear it whenever he wished to speak as a child. When Holmes knocks the mask off in their final confrontation he then only communicates in snarls and other animalistic sounds.

=== The Angel of the Opera ===
In Sam Siciliano's novel The Angel of the Opera, Sherlock Holmes is brought in to solve the case of the Opera Ghost, and both Erik's and Holmes's stories unfold through the eyes of Holmes's assistant, Henri Vernier. Siciliano places Holmes and Vernier at several of the crucial scenes in Erik and Christine's relationship, and draws parallels between Erik and Holmes. Holmes sympathizes with Erik so much that after Christine leaves him, Holmes brings him back to England. One of the first people that Erik meets on his arrival is a blind girl with a fondness for music.

== Erik's deformity ==
In the original novel, Erik is described as corpse-like and is referred to as having a "death's-head" throughout the story. He has no nose, and his eyes are sunken so deep in his skull that all that is seen are two eye sockets, except when his yellow eyes glow in the dark. His skin is yellowed and tightly stretched across his bones, and only a few wisps of dark brown hair are behind his ears and on his forehead.

His mouth is never described in as much detail, but is referred to as a "dead mouth" by Christine, and Erik acknowledges that his mouth is abnormal when lifting up his mask to display ventriloquism. He is described as extremely thin, so much so that he resembles a skeleton. Christine graphically describes his cold, bony hands, which also either feel or smell like death. There is debate among both English and French speakers as to whether the original French word used here, sentir, was intended by Leroux to mean "smells like" or "feels like", as the French word is used for both feel and smell depending on the context.

Erik woefully describes himself to Christine as a corpse who is "built up with death from head to foot". According to the Persian, Erik was born with this deformity and was exhibited as le mort vivant in freak shows earlier in his life. Erik sometimes plays up his macabre appearance, such as sleeping in a coffin as if he was a vampire; he also costumes as the titular character from Edgar Allan Poe's "The Masque of the Red Death" for the masked ball.

Lon Chaney's characterization of Erik in the silent film The Phantom of the Opera (1925) remains closest to the book in content, in that Erik's face resembles a skull with an elongated nose slit and protruding, crooked teeth. In this version, Erik is said to have been deformed at birth. Chaney was a masterful make-up artist and was considered avant-garde for creating and applying Erik's facial make-up design himself. It is said that he kept it secret until the first day of filming. The result was allegedly so frightening to the women of the time that theaters showing the movie were cautioned to keep smelling salts on hand to revive those who fainted.

Several movies based on the novel vary the deformities. In Universal's 1943 adaptation, Erique Claudin (the Phantom character) is disfigured when the publisher's assistant throws etching acid in his face. In the 1962 Hammer adaptation, while trying to extinguish a fire Professor Petrie (the Phantom character)'s face and hands are burned when he throws nitric acid (mistaking it for water) into the flames, causing a reaction that makes the flames recoil the acid onto him. In the musical horror film Phantom of the Paradise (1974), Winslow (the Phantom character) gets his head caught in a record press, while the horror version (1989) starring Robert Englund has Erik Destler (the Phantom character) selling his soul to Satan and having his face mutilated as a result. This version also has a gruesome variation on the mask, in which Erik sews harvested flesh to his face, covering the stitches with theatrical make-up.

In Andrew Lloyd Webber's 1986 musical adaptation, only half of Erik's face is deformed (thus the famous half-mask often associated with Erik's appearance). The original plan was to have a full mask and full facial disfigurement, but when the director, Harold Prince, realized that it would make expression onstage very difficult, they halved the mask. The logo featuring a full mask was publicized before the change. The deformity in the musical includes a gash on the right side of his partially balding head with exposed skull tissue, an elongated right nostril, a missing right eyebrow, swollen lips, different colored eyes and a wrinkled and warped right cheek. It is covered by a white half-mask and wig.

In the 1990 television miniseries starring Charles Dance as Erik, the character, much like in the novel, is born with a deformed face (which is never seen by the audience, only hinted at by darkened skin around his eyes) covered by an almost-full-face mask exposing only a normal chin (much like the mask shown in the Lloyd Webber musical logo). Also, in a departure from the novel, it is specifically stated that Erik's mother was never repulsed by his deformity: "She thought your face was absolutely and flawlessly beautiful."

The 1998 film adaptation starring Julian Sands as Erik is notable in that the character is not deformed and has instead a classically handsome face.

In the 2004 film adaptation of the Lloyd Webber musical, Erik's makeup was made to look much less gruesome than previous adaptations of the story. Instead of a skull-like face, his disfigurement resembles that of a face mildly malformed by a birthmark, which he covers with the mask. Film critic Roger Ebert noted that Butler was more "conventionally handsome" than his predecessors "in a GQ kind of way".

== Performers ==
=== Film ===
Onscreen, Erik has often been cast as a tragic hero but also a tragic villain, depending on the film's point of view.

- Lon Chaney in the 1925 American silent version by Rupert Julian, The Phantom of the Opera, starring Mary Philbin as Christine Daaé and Norman Kerry as Viscount Raoul de Chagny.
- Claude Rains in the 1943 Technicolor version of Phantom of the Opera. In this version, his full name was "Erique Claudin".
- Herbert Lom in the 1962 version of The Phantom of the Opera. In this version, his name was "Professor Petrie".
- William Finley in the 1974 rock-musical version of The Phantom of the Opera, Brian De Palma's Phantom of the Paradise. His full name was “Winslow Leach”.
- Robert Englund in the 1989 horror film version of The Phantom of the Opera. In this version, his full name was "Erik Destler".
- Julian Sands in Dario Argento's adaptation The Phantom of the Opera in 1998.
- Gerard Butler in the film adaptation of Andrew Lloyd Webber's stage version The Phantom of the Opera (2004)
- Ramin Karimloo in the live stage to film recording of Andrew Lloyd Webber's The Phantom of the Opera at the Royal Albert Hall
- Ben Lewis in the live stage to film recording of Andrew Lloyd Webber's Love Never Dies

=== Television ===
- Maximilian Schell as Sándor Korvin/The Phantom of the Opera in the 1983 television film The Phantom of the Opera.
- Aiden Grennell as voice of The Phantom of the Opera in the 1988 Animated TV movie of the same name.
- Charles Dance as Erik/The Phantom of the Opera in the 1990 NBC two-part television miniseries.

=== Theatre ===
- Edward Petherbridge, of the 1976 English play version.
- Peter Straker in Ken Hill's musical version in 1984.
- Richard White in Yeston/Kopit's stage version in 1991 and 1993.
- Robert Cuccioli in Yeston/Kopit's stage version in 1992–93 and 2007–08.
- Ben Forster in Ken Hill's musical version in 2024.

==== Andrew Lloyd Webber musicals ====
See main list: The Phantom of the Opera and Love Never Dies

- Michael Crawford in the original cast of the 1986 Andrew Lloyd Webber musical in London's West End, the 1988 cast on Broadway and the 1989 cast in Los Angeles.
- Steve Barton originated the role of Raoul in the West End and on Broadway. He understudied Crawford in the West End production and in 1990 he replaced Groenendaal as the Phantom on Broadway.
- Dave Willetts replaced Michael Crawford in the London cast when Crawford was cast to open the Broadway production in 1988. Also played the role in the first UK tour.
- Timothy Nolen replaced Michael Crawford on Broadway when Crawford was cast to open the Los Angeles production in 1989, and is the first baritone Phantom, and the only bass baritone Phantom
- Cris Groenendaal originated the role of André on Broadway and replaced Nolen as the Phantom on Broadway. He later reprised the role in the Canadian tour and replaced Wilkinson in Toronto.
- Robert Guillaume replaced Michael Crawford in Los Angeles, becoming the first African American Phantom in the US.
- Peter Karrie played the Phantom in the West End and Canada. He later played the role in the UK tour and the Canadian "Far East" Tour.
- Colm Wilkinson took on the role at the 1985 Sydmonton Festival and the original Canadian production in 1989.
- Anthony Warlow originated the role in Australia (1990–91) and has since reprised the role (2007–09).
- Rob Guest, who subsequent to Anthony Warlow, played the role a record 2,289 times (1991–98) in the Australian production of Andrew Lloyd Webber's musical.
- Davis Gaines played the role over 2,000 times on Broadway, on tour, in Los Angeles, and in San Francisco. Also played Raoul.
- Howard McGillin, the longest-running Phantom on Broadway (1999-2009 on and off)
- Anthony Crivello appeared in over 2,400 performances in Phantom: The Las Vegas Spectacular (2006–2012)
- John Owen-Jones played the role in the West End production and the 2012 25th Anniversary UK tour
- Earl Carpenter played the role in the London West End from 2003 to 2007, 2011 to 2012, and in 2015. He also reprised the role on the 25h Anniversary UK tour from 2012 to 2013. He most recently played the role for a temporary engagement from February to April 2023 meaning he has played the role on and off for two decades.
- Ramin Karimloo played both Raoul and The Phantom in the London West End, as well as The Phantom in the West End production of Love Never Dies, he also played the Phantom in the 25th Anniversary production of The Phantom of the Opera at the Royal Albert Hall in 2011. He reprised his role of the Phantom for the Italian premiere of The Phantom of the Opera in 2023 and in China in 2026.
- Hugh Panaro – Played the Phantom on and off from 1999 to 2014 and also portrayed Raoul. He played the Phantom in the 25th-anniversary production on Broadway.
- Norm Lewis played the Phantom from May 2014 to February 2015 becoming the first African American Phantom on Broadway. He reprised his role in a West End concert version of Love Never Dies in 2023.
- Ethan Freeman played both André and the Phantom in London’s West End. He also played the Phantom in Austria, Canada, and Germany.
- Ben Lewis played the Phantom in Love Never Dies in the Australian production (2011–12) as well as in The Phantom of the Opera in the West End (2017–18)
- Marcus Lovett played the Phantom on Broadway from 1993 to 1994 and in the West End from 2012 to 2013.
- Brad Little played the role over 2,000 times on the US national and world tour, as well as on Broadway as a temporary replacement in 2002. Also played Raoul.
- Ted Keegan played the role from 1999 to 2002 on the US tour and was a temporary replacement for the role on Broadway in 1999. He understudied the role on Broadway from 1995 to 1998 and later came back as an understudy for the role on Broadway from 2018 to 2023. He also understudied the role in Phantom: The Las Vegas Spectacular. Keegan, Mackintosh and Stolle alternated as the Phantom on Broadway for the final two weeks of the production after Ben Crawford left. Keegan has played the role on and off for over 25 years.
- Paul Stanley on stage in Toronto (1999)
- Jeff Keller understudied the role in the original Broadway cast and was a temporary replacement for the role in 1990 and 1994.
- Martin Smith replaced Willetts in London for two months.
- Gary Mauer played the role on the third US tour. He also played the role as a temporary replacement on Broadway in 2007. Also played Raoul.
- Brent Barrett in Germany and Phantom: The Las Vegas Spectacular.
- Simon Bowman played the role in London's West End in 1996 and 1997.
- Peter Cousens played the role in London's West End.
- Glyn Kerslake played the role in the West End in 1998.
- Mark Jacoby played the role on Broadway and tour in the early 1990s
- Peter Polycarpou was the fifth actor to portray the Phantom in the West End
- Ciarán Sheehan played the Phantom in Toronto. He also played Raoul and understudied the Phantom on Broadway and on tour.
- Tim Martin Gleason played the role on the US tour. Also understudied the role on Broadway while being principal Raoul.
- Kevin Gray replaced Barton and became the first Asian American Phantom on Broadway, he also played the role on tour. Before playing the Phantom he played Raoul on Broadway
- Thomas James O'Leary played the Phantom from 1996 to 1999 on Broadway. Also played the role on tour in 1995.
- Ron Bohmer played the Phantom on the second US national tour.
- John Cudia – Played the Phantom on Broadway and on tour. Also played Raoul.
- Thomas Borchert played the role in Germany
- Jeff Hyslop played the role in Canada in 1999
- René Simard played the role in Canada in 1999 before being replaced by Stanley
- Mark Wynter was the Phantom standby while playing Andre in the West End
- Tam Mutu was Karimloo's alternate in Love Never Dies
- Scott Davies played the Phantom from 1999 to 2001 in the West End and was a standby for the role from 1997 to 1998 and 2009 to 2020.
- Alexander Lewis played Raoul and understudied Warlow in the 2007 Australia production. He went on for the role during Warlow’s absence in late 2008 and early 2009.
- Peter Jöback – Previously played the Phantom in the West End and Broadway. Took over on Broadway in 2018 for the 30th anniversary
- James Barbour played the Phantom on Broadway until December 2017
- Ben Forster played The Phantom in the West End until December 2017
- Tim Howar played the role in the West End in 2018 before being replaced by Thaxton for six months and then took over the role again in 2019.
- David Thaxton played The Phantom in the West End in 2018 and 2019 in between the two stints of Howar.
- Jonathan Roxmouth – The Phantom of the Opera world tour 2012 as the youngest English-speaking Phantom / 2019–2020 tour
- Ben Crawford played The Phantom on Broadway from 2018 to 2023
- Josh Piterman played the Phantom in London's West End from September 2019 to March 2020 when the show was closed due to the COVID-19 pandemic. He later reprised his role in Australia in 2022 and 2023.
- Killian Donnelly played the Phantom in London's West End from 2021 to 2023 and in the 2020 UK tour
- Jeremy Stolle understudied the Phantom, Raoul, and Piangi on Broadway from 2008 to the show’s closing. He played the Phantom in the majority of the performances during the last 2 weeks on Broadway doing 8 shows and Keegan doing 4 of the shows before Mackintosh took over for the final 3. Stolle also understudies the role of The Phantom in the 2025 Off-Broadway production.
- Laird Mackintosh played André in the Broadway production and understudied the Phantom from 2013 to 2019, he was a temporary replacement for the Phantom in 2014, 2017, and 2018. He also played the role for the final 3 performances on Broadway in April 2023.
- Jon Robyns played The Phantom in the West End from April 2023 to July 2024.
- Dean Chisnall played The Phantom in the West End from July 2024 to August 2026.
- Hugh Panaro, Nik Walker, Kyle Scatliffe, Telly Leung, Jeff Kready, and Clay Singer alternate in the role for the 2025 immersive Off-Broadway production. Quentin Earl Darrington and Ryan Vona joined them in January and February 2026. Derrick Davis, Nick Cartell, Nicholas Edwards, and Austin Colby joined as the Phantom in the summer. Jeremy Stolle, Cooper Grodin, and Tally Sessions have also taken over the role for limited engagements in the casts.
- Samuel Wyn-Morris has played the Phantom on the World Tour since August 2025.
- Isaiah Bailey has played the Phantom on the North American Tour since November 2025.
- Jordan Donica began starring as The Phantom in September 2026 in the West End for the production’s 40th anniversary cast.
- Jamie Muscato played The Phantom in a West End concert staging of Love Never Dies in October 2026.
