= Javert =

Fictional character from Les Misérables

- Les Misérables character
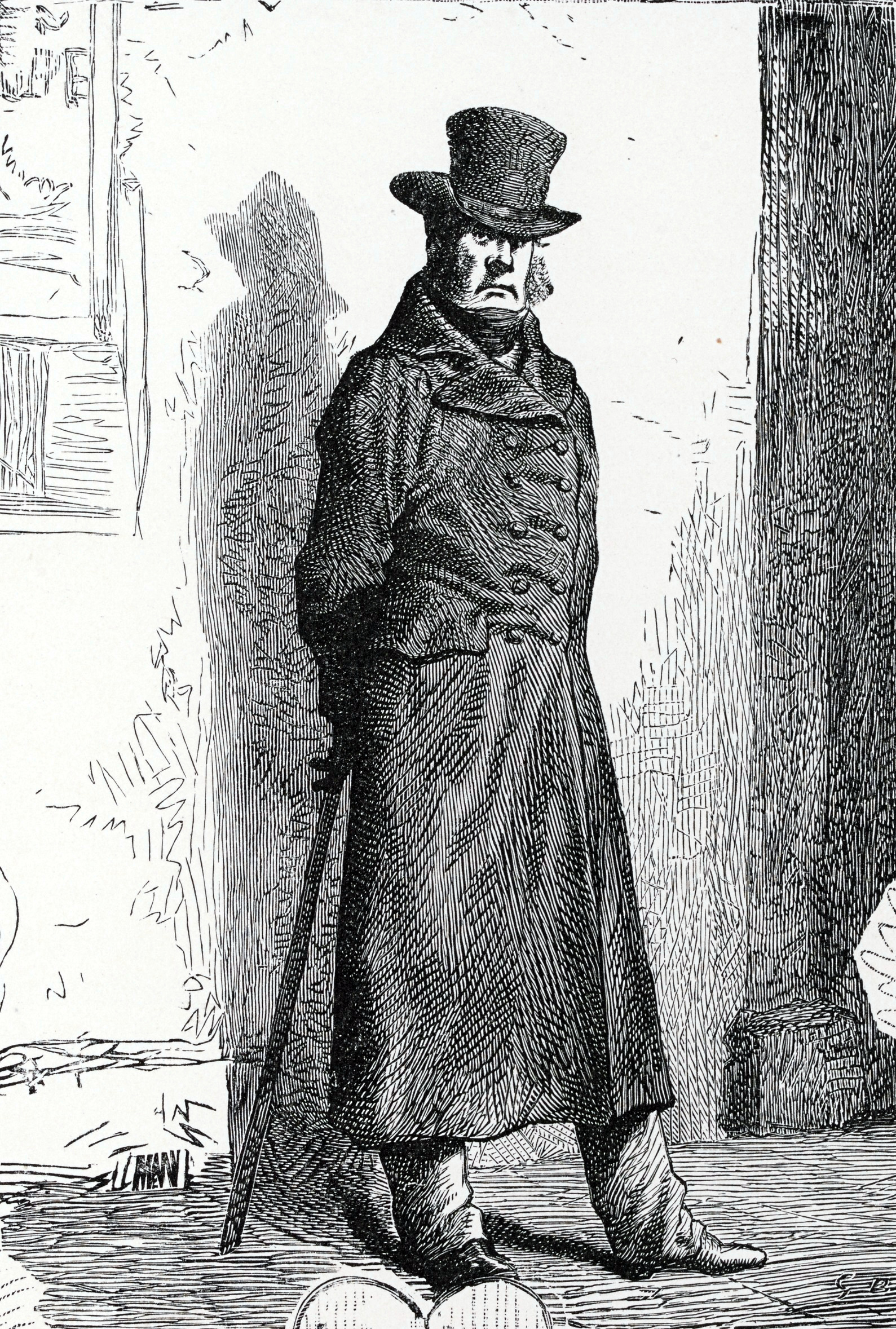
- Javert – illustration from original publication of Les Misérables, after a painting by Gustave Brion
- Created by: Victor Hugo

In-universe information
- Gender: Male
- Occupation: Prison guard Police inspector Detective
- Religion: Catholic
- Nationality: French

Javert (French pronunciation: [ʒavɛʁ]) is a fictional character and a main antagonist of Victor Hugo's 1862 novel Les Misérables. He was presumably born in 1780 and died on June 7, 1832. First a prison guard, and then a police inspector, his character is defined by his legalist tendencies, authoritarian worldview, and lack of empathy for criminals of all forms. In the novel, he hunts down the protagonist Jean Valjean after his violation of parole and theft from the child Petit Gervais. No first name is given in the source novel.

== Character ==
Hugo writes that Javert is composed of two "simple" sentiments, which are "respect for authority" and "hatred of rebellion". In Javert's eyes, "murder, robbery, all crimes, are only forms of rebellion". He also "(envelops) in a blind and profound faith everyone who had a function in the state, from the prime minister to the rural policeman". Reflective thought is "an uncommon thing for him, and singularly painful" because thought inevitably contains "a certain amount of internal rebellion".

He is without vices, but upon occasion will take a pinch of snuff. His life is one "of privations, isolation, self-denial, and chastity—never any amusement".

Javert has been described as a legalist: His "moral foundation... is built strictly on legalism"; he is "one of the most tragic legalists in Western literature" and "the consummate legalist".

Born in a prison (his mother, a fortune-telleress, and his father serving in the prison galleys), Javert sees himself as excluded from a society that "irrevocably closes its doors on two classes of men, those who attack it and those who guard it". He becomes a law officer on the basis of "an irrepressible hatred for that bohemian race to which he belong[s]" and a personal foundation of "rectitude, order, and honesty". So devoted is he to this choice that, Hugo writes, "[h]e would have arrested his own father if he escaped from prison and turned in his own mother for breaking parole. And he would have done it with that sort of interior satisfaction that springs from virtue."

Following his encounters with Jean Valjean during the June Rebellion, in which he is first spared by Valjean and, later, spares him arrest, Javert experiences a deep torment caused by the compromise of his previous worldview. Where previously he has "never in his life known anything but one straight line", Jean Valjean's behavior compels him to see two lines, "both equally straight" and "contradictory". The profound confusion caused by the realizations that the law is not infallible, that he himself is not irreproachable, and that there exists a superior force (identified by Hugo with God) to what he has known, plunges him into such a despair that he commits suicide.

The character of Javert is loosely based on Eugène François Vidocq, a criminal and adventurer who became a police official (though Vidocq wrote that he never arrested anyone who stole out of need). Hugo also drew on Vidocq's life for the character of Valjean. In the novel, Hugo describes Javert as "a marble informer, Brutus in Vidocq".

== In the novel ==
=== Part One: Fantine ===
Javert first becomes familiar with the convict Jean Valjean as an assistant guard in the Bagne of Toulon. Years later, in 1823, the fugitive Valjean is living under the name Monsieur Madeleine and serving as the mayor of a small town identified as Montreuil-sur-Mer, where he is a successful manufacturer. Javert arrives in 1820 to serve as an inspector with the local police. Javert suspects Madeleine's true identity and becomes convinced of it when he watches Madeleine demonstrate extraordinary strength by lifting a loaded cart off of a man trapped beneath it. Madeleine also antagonizes Javert by dismissing his attempt to arrest Fantine, a prostitute detained for having a violent row with a street idler. Javert decides to denounce Valjean as an ex-convict, but learns from Parisian authorities that they have already arrested someone who calls himself Champmathieu; the authorities believed Champmathieu is really Valjean.

Unsure, Javert goes to Arras to see Champmathieu and satisfies himself that this is the real Valjean. He visits Madeleine and asks him to dismiss him from the police because he "has failed in respect, and in the gravest manner, towards a magistrate" by suspecting Madeleine. He tells Madeleine: "You will say that I might have handed in my resignation, but that does not suffice. Handing in one's resignation is honorable. I have failed in my duty; I ought to be punished; I must be turned out." He condemns himself at length—"if I were not severe towards myself, all the justice that I have done would become injustice"—and begs to be dismissed.

Madeleine/Valjean travels to the court in Arras and discloses his true identity, saving Champmathieu. He returns to Montreuil-sur-Mer, where Javert arrests him the next morning at Fantine's hospital bedside. Valjean asks for three days to bring Fantine's daughter Cosette to her, but Javert denies his request. Valjean escapes from the city jail, is later recaptured and returned to the galleys, and again escapes a few months later, though the authorities think he has drowned.

=== Part Two: Cosette ===
Javert is recruited to be an inspector in the capital. Javert is informed of Valjean's presumed death (which the latter had feigned during his last escape) not long after it happens. Early in the year 1824, Javert hears of an alleged kidnapping: a foster child taken from the couple that kept her. When he hears that this is supposed to have taken place in Montfermeil (Valjean was captured just as he was trying to get there), he visits the Thénardiers. Thénardier, however, does not want to become involved with the police, and tells Javert that the girl was fetched by her grandfather, and that he saw the man's passport. In March of the same year, Javert hears of a man nicknamed "the beggar who gives alms." Curious, he tracks the man to the Gorbeau House tenement, and recognizes Jean Valjean. When Valjean attempts to escape with Cosette, Javert chases them into what seems to him a dead end. Valjean evades capture by climbing over the stone wall of a convent and pulling Cosette up over the wall on a rope.

=== Part Three: Marius ===
In 1832, Javert chances to meet Valjean again while leading a squad of policemen in the capture of a gang which had been terrorizing Paris for years: Patron-Minette. The Thénardiers, who have lost their inn, now live at Gorbeau House and are associated with the gang. Unbeknownst to Javert, the venerable elderly gentleman whom the Thénardiers and Patron-Minette intend to extort is Jean Valjean. When Marius overhears the plans for capturing Valjean, he informs the police of the imminent crime, and is introduced to inspector Javert, who gives him two pistols to fire a signal for when he and his team should enter the building. Javert does not have the opportunity to recognize Valjean upon saving him from the gang; however, Valjean recognizes Javert almost immediately and makes a quick escape out the window of the attic where the confrontation was taking place.

=== Part Four: St. Denis ===
During the 1832 June Rebellion, Javert, working undercover to gather information about the revolutionaries, joins a group of them at the barricade they have erected in the Rue de la Chanvrerrie. However, Gavroche, a street urchin, recognizes him as a policeman and denounces him. The revolutionaries search him, finding a little round card confirming his police identity. Javert is imprisoned by the group.

When Valjean appears at the barricade with the intent of finding Marius, the beloved of Cosette, he and Javert recognize one another. Valjean soon requests, as reward for protecting the barricade from soldiers and national guardsmen, that he be allowed to execute Javert. Enjolras, the leader of the insurrection, acquiesces, and Valjean leads Javert away from the barricade and into a side street. There, instead of killing Javert, Valjean cuts his bonds and implores him to run and save himself. He also gives Javert his address, in the unlikely case that he survives the uprising. Valjean then fires a shot into the air and returns to the barricade, where he tells everyone that the policeman is dead.

As the army storms the barricade, Valjean manages to grab the badly wounded Marius and dives into a sewer, where he wanders with Marius on his shoulders. With the help of Thénardier, Valjean manages to find an exit but is again met by Javert. Valjean repeats that he is ready to surrender, but he asks for Javert's help in delivering the wounded boy to safety. They travel to Valjean's house, and Javert says that he will wait for Valjean to come back downstairs. However, when Valjean looks out of the window, Javert is gone.

Javert wanders the streets in emotional turmoil: his mind simply cannot reconcile the image he had carried through the years of Valjean as a brutal ex-convict with his acts of kindness on the barricades. Now, Javert can be justified neither in letting Valjean go nor in arresting him. For the first time in his life, Javert is faced with the situation where he cannot act lawfully without acting immorally, and vice versa. Javert is unable to find a solution to this dilemma, and horrified at the sudden realization that Valjean was simultaneously a criminal and a good person — a conundrum which reveals deep flaws in his ethical system, and suggests to him the existence of a superior moral system. He feels that the only possible resolution for himself is in death, and—after leaving for the prefect of police a brief letter addressing lapses in the Conciergerie — he drowns himself in the river Seine.

== Adaptations ==
Since the original publication of Les Misérables in 1862, the character of Javert has appeared in a large number of adaptations in numerous types of media based on the novel, including books, films, musicals, plays, games, and web-comics. The actors who have played him on screen include Charles Vanel, Charles Laughton, Bernard Blier, Anthony Perkins, Michel Bouquet, Geoffrey Rush, John Malkovich and Russell Crowe.

=== Musical ===
Russell Crowe as Javert in the 2012 film adaptation of the musical

In the stage musical of the same name, Javert is a central character. His character, and his role in the plot, is largely unchanged, and he remains the primary antagonist. His is considered a bass-baritone or baritone role. He wears a standard costume designed to look like a mid-19th century French policeman. He was portrayed by Roger Allam in the Original London Production and Terrence Mann in the original Broadway cast of Les Misérables. Ethan Freeman was notable for highlighting Javert's inner pain and his more emotional connection to Valjean. Philip Quast played the character in the 10th Anniversary Concert in 1995. He has also been played by notable Broadway actor Norm Lewis in the 2010 25th anniversary concert. Russell Crowe played the policeman in the 2012 movie adaptation of Les Misérables. Other people who have played the character include Michael Ball, Earl Carpenter, Clive Carter, Anthony Crivello, Robert Cuccioli, Hadley Fraser, Shuler Hensley, Bradley Jaden, Brian Stokes Mitchell, Jeremy Secomb, Will Swenson, Hayden Tee, David Thaxton, Chuck Wagner, and Robert Westenberg.

== In popular culture ==
Inspector Franklin Jalbert, a character in the 2024 novella Danny Coughlin's Bad Dream by Stephen King, is named for, and inspired by, Javert.
