= John Owen-Jones =

Welsh musical theatre actor and singer

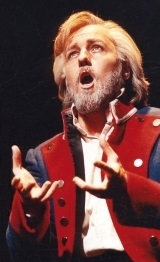
- John Owen-Jones as Jean Valjean in Les Misérables
- Born: 5 May 1971 (age 55); Burry Port, Wales
- Other name: JOJ
- Education: Royal Central School of Speech and Drama
- Occupation: Actor/singer
- Known for: Les Misérables; The Phantom of the Opera
- Spouse: Teresa Jones
- Children: 2
- Website: johnowenjones.com

A modern version of Bread of Heaven, sung by Owen-Jones

John Owen-Jones (born 5 May 1971) is a Welsh musical theatre actor and singer, best known for his portrayals of Jean Valjean in Alain Boublil & Claude-Michel Schönberg's Les Misérables and The Phantom in Andrew Lloyd Webber's The Phantom of the Opera.

He most recently appeared in these roles as an emergency Valjean replacement in the 2021 West End production at the Sondheim Theatre, and as The Phantom in the 2016 West End production at Her Majesty’s Theatre. He has now recorded six studio albums.

== Early life and education ==
Owen-Jones was born in 1971 and originates from Burry Port in Carmarthenshire. He was educated at Glan-y-Mor Comprehensive School, and was a member of the still running local theatre group, Llanelli Youth Theatre. Jones went on to train at the Central School of Speech and Drama in London. He graduated in 1994 with a BA (Hons) in Acting.

He has been married since 1999 to Teresa, a primary school teacher. They live in Surrey with their two children.

== Musical Theatre ==
During 1995 he played the 'liebeslieder' in Stephen Sondheim's A Little Night Music at the National Theatre along with Judi Dench, Patricia Hodge, Joanna Riding and Siân Phillips, and in The Ladies Paradise at the RNT Studio.

In 1998, he became the youngest person ever to play the role of Jean Valjean full-time when he took over in the London production at the age of 26. He had previously understudied the role, and had also performed the roles of the Factory Foreman, Feuilly, Grantaire and Enjolras. Owen-Jones also appeared in the choir of the 10th Anniversary Concert at the Royal Albert Hall in 1995.

In 2000, he was part of that year's season at the Regent's Park Open Air Theatre. He played roles in The Pirates of Penzance and Much Ado About Nothing. In 2001, he was chosen to succeed Scott Davies in the title role in The Phantom of the Opera. He left the role on 26 February 2005, after three and a half years and nearly 1,400 performances, making him the longest running London Phantom. His last performance in this run was with Rachel Barrell. In 2015 he agreed to play the Phantom again for a limited period of time – 7 September 2015 until Saturday 30 January 2016.

His other theatre work includes Antipholus in The Boys from Syracuse and Lorenzo in The Merchant of Venice at Harrogate Theatre, Herr Zeller in The Sound of Music, Cléante in The Hypochondriac, Valère in Le Médecin Volant at the West Yorkshire Playhouse and Uprooted at the Tricycle Theatre, and he performed in a private concert version in London of the musical Tomorrow Morning by Laurence Mark Wythe.

Owen-Jones reprised the role of Jean Valjean in Les Misérables at the Queen's Theatre in London, beginning 27 June 2005. He took a month off in May 2006, during which time he played the role of Gaylord Ravenal in Show Boat, the first fully staged musical performed at the Royal Albert Hall, which played for a limited season between 10 and 25 June 2006. He then returned to Misérables in the West End until his contract expired on 6 October 2007. After finishing his London contract, Owen-Jones went to the US to perform the role of Valjean on Broadway, trading locales with Drew Sarich, who was playing the role of Valjean in the American production. Owen-Jones began performances on 23 October 2007 and returned in January 2008 when the show finished its Broadway run. Owen-Jones most recently played Valjean on the 25th Anniversary International Touring production of Les Misérables, which opened 12 December 2009 in Cardiff, and ended 2 October 2010 at the Barbican Theatre in London, where the show first played.

He performed the role of the Phantom in London once again, as of 1 November 2010 and continued his run until 10 December 2011. His first performance back was with Sofia Escobar. From March 2012, Owen-Jones played the title role in the show's 25th Anniversary UK tour opposite Katie Hall. He left the tour that September and was replaced by Earl Carpenter.

On 16 December 2010, Owen-Jones appeared in the Royal Variety Performance at the London Palladium as part of the 'Valjean Quartet' alongside Alfie Boe, Colm Wilkinson and Simon Bowman (Each of whom have previously played the role of Jean Valjean in various productions of Les Misérables). Together they sang "Bring Him Home" just as they had performed at the 25th Anniversary Performance of Les Misérables at the O2 Arena. Earlier that week, the recording of the song from the O2 Arena concert had been released as a UK Single.

As part of the 25th anniversary of The Phantom of the Opera, Owen-Jones performed the title song at The Royal Variety Performance – held in The Lowry, Manchester – on Monday 5 December 2011. Performing alongside Nicole Scherzinger, Owen-Jones was joined by three other former Phantoms (Simon Bowman, Earl Carpenter and Ramin Karimloo). The performance was aired on ITV1 on Wednesday 14 December 2011. He also performed it, along with The Music of the Night, with Karimloo, Colm Wilkinson, Peter Jöback and Anthony Warlow, at the 25th anniversary production The Phantom of the Opera at the Royal Albert Hall in October 2011. He also sang at the 25th anniversary gala of New York's production of the show with Ramin Karimloo, Hugh Panaro, and Peter Joback, the last of whom went on to reprise the role on Broadway for a short time.

Owen-Jones also toured the UK with the Earl Carpenter production of The Three Phantoms, the highlight of which is a trio performance of 'Music of the Night'. In January 2014, he went to New York to record the concept album for a new Broadway show An American Victory with Hugh Panaro, Ruthie Henshall, Alexander Gemignani, and many other Broadway stars. The musical will be directed by Larry Blank.

In 2015 from October to January 2016 he returned to Phantom of the Opera. Shortly after, Owen-Jones returned to Broadway to reprise the role of Valjean in the production's closing cast. On his return from Broadway, Owen-Jones appeared in a concert version of The Hired Man at Cadogan Hall.

My ambitions were to play Valjean in the West End, work at the National Theatre and work with Sondheim. I achieved them all within 3 years. After that I had to make new ones up! I then aspired to play the Phantom, release a CD and work on Broadway. Achieved all that too so currently thinking of new ones…!

— John Owen-Jones

== Television ==
Owen-Jones's work on television includes The Bill; The Life and Adventures of Nicholas Nickleby; The South Bank Show; The Margaret Williams Show; A Week in the West End; Record Breakers; and Backstage: Pebble Mill.

In 2014 he appeared at the Golden Mask Awards in Russia, where he and Anna O'Byrne sang a part of the title song of Phantom of the Opera. In December 2004 he appeared in a televised Christmas Concert as a featured soloist, alongside Michael Ball. In May 2014, he appeared on The Elaine Paige Show, with Trevor Nunn, Herbert Kretzmer and Scarlett Strallen. He sang the song "Bring Him Home" from the musical Les Misérables.

== Theatre Credits ==
| Year | Title | Role | Theatre | Location |
|---|---|---|---|---|
| 1995-1996 | A Little Night Music | Mr. Erlanson | Royal National Theatre | London |
| 1995 | Les Misérables 10th Anniversary Concert | Ensemble | Royal Albert Hall | London |
| 1996-1997 | Les Misérables | Factory Foreman / Feuilly u/s Enjolras u/s Grantaire | Palace Theatre | West End |
| 1997-1998 | Les Misérables | Enjolras u/s Jean Valjean | Palace Theatre | West End |
| 1998-2000 | Les Misérables | Jean Valjean | Palace Theatre | West End |
| 2000 | The Pirates of Penzance | Samuel / Policeman u/s Frederic | Regent's Park Open Air Theatre | London |
| 2000 | Much Ado About Nothing | Hero | Regent's Park Open Air Theatre | London |
| 2000 | Sweeney Todd: The Demon Barber of Fleet Street | Adolfo Pirelli | Royal Festival Hall | London |
| 2001-2005 | The Phantom of the Opera | The Phantom of the Opera | Her Majesty's Theatre | West End |
| 2002 | Carousel | Enoch Snow | Royal Festival Hall | London |
| 2005-2007 | Les Misérables | Jean Valjean | Queen's Theatre | West End |
| 2006 | Show Boat | Gaylord Ravenal | Royal Albert Hall | London |
| 2007-2008 | Les Misérables | Jean Valjean | Broadhurst Theatre | Broadway |
| 2009-2010 | Les Misérables | Jean Valjean | —N/a | 25th Anniversary Europe Tour |
| 2010-2011 | The Phantom of the Opera | The Phantom of the Opera | Her Majesty's Theatre | West End |
| 2011-2012 | The Boys From Syracuse | Antipholus | Royal National Theatre | London |
| 2012 | The Phantom of the Opera | The Phantom of the Opera | —N/a | 25th Anniversary UK Tour |
| 2013 | The Phantom of the Opera | Emergency Phantom of the Opera | Liverpool Empire Theatre | Liverpool |
| 2013-2014 | The Sound Of Music | Captain von Trapp | Royal National Theatre | London |
| 2014 | Tomorrow Morning | Will | —N/a | Kottingbrunn |
| 2014 | The Three Phantoms | Featured Soloist | —N/a | UK National Tour |
| 2015 | Sweeney Todd: The Demon Barber of Fleet Street | Adolfo Pirelli | English National Opera | London |
| 2015-2016 | The Phantom of the Opera | The Phantom of the Opera | Her Majesty's Theatre | West End |
| 2016 | Les Misérables | Jean Valjean | Imperial Theatre | Broadway |
| 2016 | The Hired Man | John | Cadogan Hall | London |
| 2016 | Les Misérables | Jean Valjean | Dubai Opera | Dubai |
| 2017 | The Wild Party | Burrs | The Other Palace | Off-West End |
| 2017 | South Pacific | Emile de Becque | Cadogan Hall | London |
| 2017 | Tiger Bay The Musical | Marquess of Bute | Millennium Centre | Cardiff |
| 2018 | Phantom of the Opera by Ken Hill | The Phantom | Tokyu Theatre Orb | Tokyo |
| 2019 | Les Misérables | Jean Valjean (Alternate) | Gielgud Theatre | West End |
| 2020 | Les Misérables | Jean Valjean (Alternate) | Sondheim Theatre | West End |
| 2021 | Les Misérables | Emergency Jean Valjean | Sondheim Theatre | West End |
| 2022 | The Great British Bake Off Musical | Phil Hollinghurst | Everyman Theatre | Cheltenham |
| 2023 | The Great British Bake Off Musical | Phil Hollinghurst | Noël Coward Theatre | West End |
| 2023 | La Cage aux Folles | Edouard Dindon | Regent's Park Open Air Theatre | London |
| 2023-2024 | A Funny Thing Happened on the Way to the Forum | Miles Gloriosus | Le Lido | Paris |
| 2025 | If/Then | Stephen | Savoy Theatre | London |
| 2025 | The Great Gatsby | Meyer Wolfsheim | London Coliseum | West End |
| 2026 | Into the Woods | The Narrator / The Mysterious Man | Bridge Theatre | Off-West End |

== Recordings ==
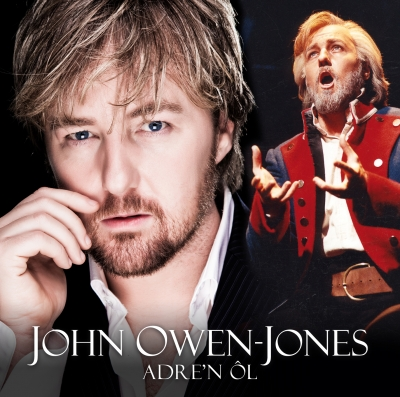
Adre'n ôl - a Welsh album (Sain), released in 2011

In late 2006, Owen-Jones released his first solo CD, a five-track EP entitled Hallelujah. He released a self-titled album in 2006 with tracks from Les Misérables, Phantom of the Opera, and a trio with Michael Ball and Bryn Terfel.

In 2012, he produced a third album, Unmasked, which was released on 16 April. In 2015, Owen-Jones released the album Rise; with tracks from musicals and known hymns, the album includes some Welsh language songs, followed by Rise in 2015 and Bring Him Home in 2016. His sixth album, Spotlight, was released on 15 February 2019.
