= Simon Bowman =

British actor and singer (born 1961)

- Born: 16 February 1961 (age 65)
- Origin: Cardiff, Wales
- Years active: 1982–present

Simon Bowman (born 16 February 1961) is a British actor and singer, born in Cardiff and trained at Mountview Theatre School. He is best known for originating the role of Chris, opposite Lea Salonga's Kim, in the original production of Miss Saigon at Theatre Royal Drury Lane in the West End.

Prior to that, he was Marius in Cameron Mackintosh/RSC's production of Les Misérables at the Palace Theatre, returning there 14 years later in the role of Jean Valjean. After the success of Miss Saigon, he then played Raoul and then The Phantom in Andrew Lloyd Webber’s The Phantom of the Opera at Her Majesty's Theatre, London. He recently reprised the role of Jean Valjean on the West End at the Queen's Theatre. Bowman also performed with Alfie Boe, Colm Wilkinson and John Owen-Jones in the 25th Anniversary Concert of Les Misérables. They sang the song "Bring Him Home" as a quartet in the Finale' of the concert.

He shot to fame in 1983 as Young Elvis in Alan Bleasdale's hit musical Are You Lonesome Tonight? In 2006, he played the rock star again in This is Elvis and played a dentist in the BBC One series Doctors.

In 2009, Bowman released a CD, One Night With You featuring songs from his career in the West End.

He performed with Alfie Boe, Colm Wilkinson and John Owen-Jones as part of the 'Valjean Quartet' on 16 December 2010, at the Royal Variety Performance; once again singing "Bring Him Home".

As part of the 25th anniversary of The Phantom of the Opera, Simon performed the title song at The Royal Variety Performance - held in The Lowry, Manchester - on 5 December 2011. Performing alongside Nicole Scherzinger, Bowman was joined by three other former Phantoms (Ramin Karimloo, Earl Carpenter and John Owen-Jones). The performance was aired on ITV1 on Wednesday 14 December 2011.

In 2019, Bowman played The Bishop of Digne in Les Misérables: The Staged Concert.

== Stage credits ==
Year	Title	Role	Notes
1983	Are You Lonesome Tonight?	Young Elvis	
1986	Les Misérables	Marius Pontmercy	West End
1988	They're Playing Our Song	Vernon Gersch	
1989-91	Miss Saigon	Chris Scott	West End
1994-96	The Phantom of the Opera	Raoul, Vicomte de Chagny	West End
1996-97	The Phantom of the Opera	The Phantom of the Opera	West End
2000	Les Misérables	Jean Valjean	West End
2004	Les Misérables	Jean Valjean	West End
2006	This is Elvis	Elvis	
2009-11	Les Misérables	Jean Valjean	West End
2019	Les Misérables	The Bishop of Digne	West End

He also has concert credits as Judas in Jesus Christ Superstar (Norway, Sweden, Finland, Iceland, Gran Canaria); Phantom in The Phantom of the Opera (Opera House, Paris); and Che in Evita (World Premiere Concert, Chelmsford).
