= Jean Valjean =

Fictional character in Les Misérables

- Les Misérables character
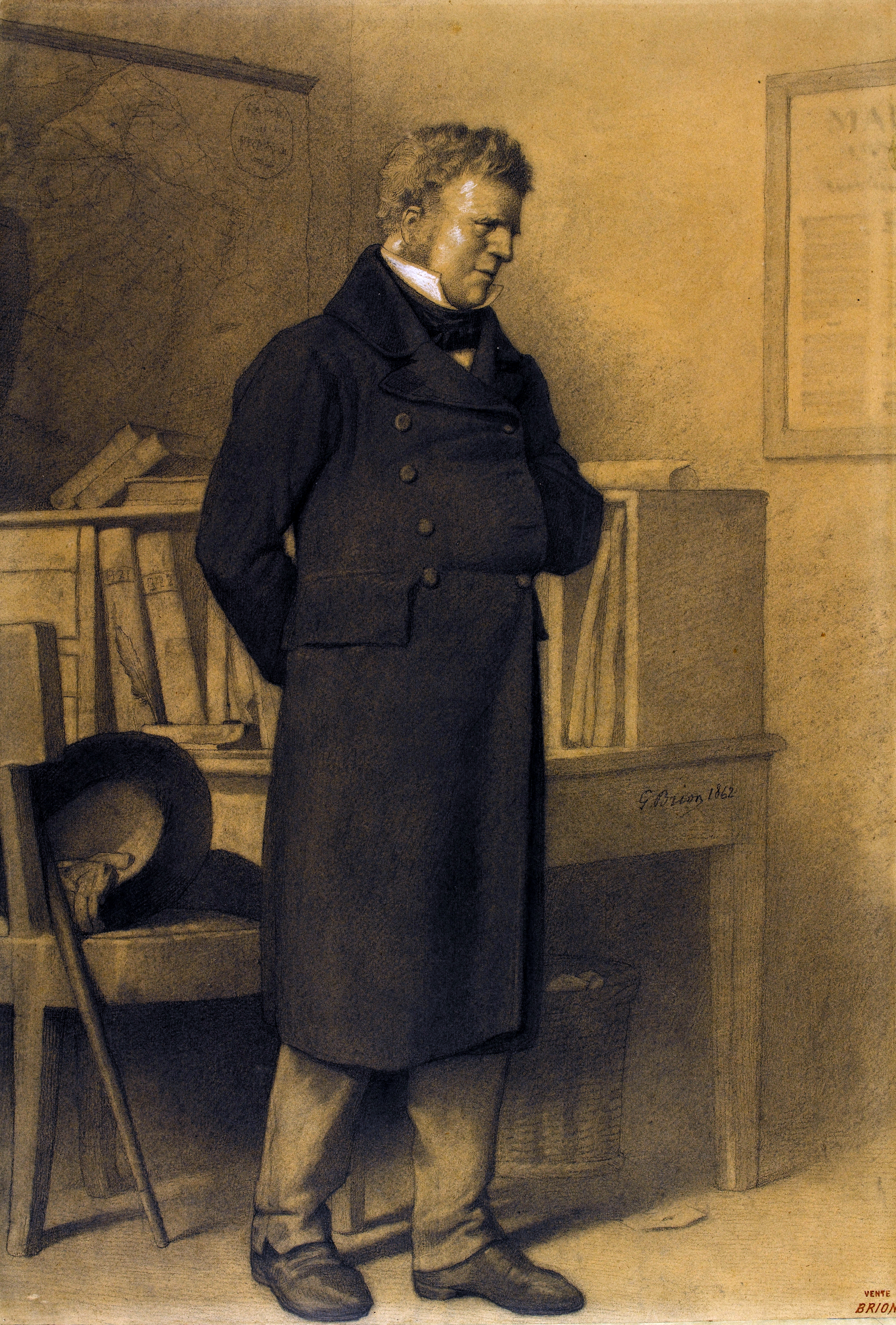
- Jean Valjean disguised as Monsieur Madeleine. Illustration by Gustave Brion.
- Created by: Victor Hugo

In-universe information
- Full name: Jean Valjean
- Aliases: Monsieur Madeleine; Ultime Fauchelevent; Urbain Fabre; Prisoner 24601; Prisoner 9430
- Nickname: Monsieur Leblanc
- Gender: Male
- Occupation: Tree pruner; Convict; Businessman; Mayor of Montreuil-sur-Mer
- Family: Jean Valjean Sr. (father); Jeanne Mathieu (mother); Jeanne (sister); Unnamed brother; Seven unnamed nieces and nephews
- Children: Cosette (surrogate daughter)
- Relatives: Unnamed brother-in-law
- Religion: Roman Catholic
- Nationality: French
- Born: 1769
- Death: 1833 (aged 64)

Jean Valjean (French: [ʒɑ̃ val.ʒɑ̃]) is the protagonist of Victor Hugo's 1862 novel Les Misérables. The story depicts the character's struggle to lead a normal life and redeem himself after serving a 19-year-long prison sentence for stealing bread to feed his sister's starving children and attempting to escape from prison. Valjean is also known in the novel as Monsieur Madeleine, Ultime Fauchelevent (once called Tranchelevent by Monsieur Gillenormand), Monsieur Leblanc, and Urbain Fabre.

Jean Valjean and police Inspector Javert, who repeatedly encounters Valjean and attempts to return him to prison, have become archetypes in literary culture.

== Outline of the novel ==
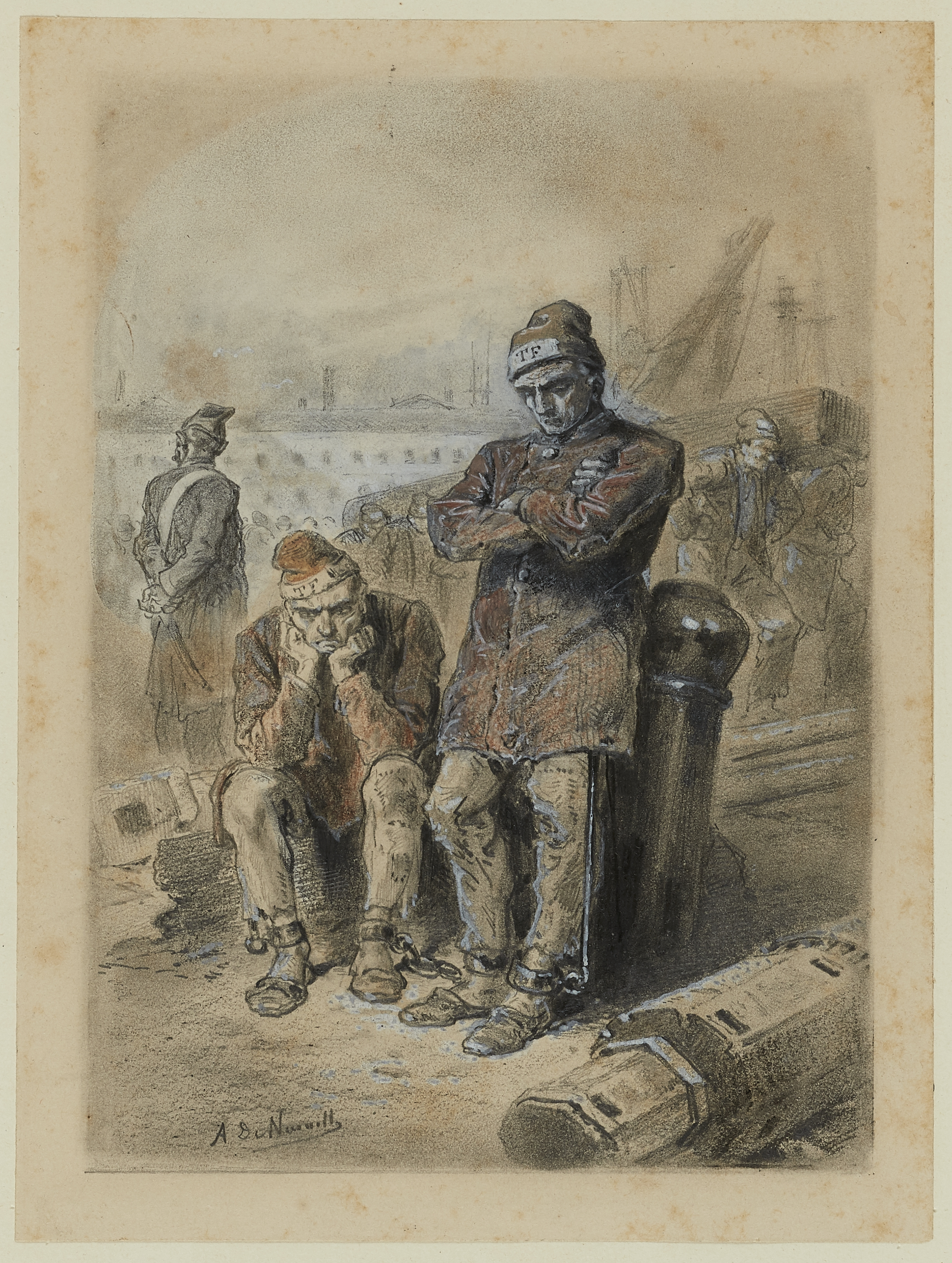
Valjean (right) in the Bagne of Toulon; the letters TF on his hat refer to travaux forcés ("hard labour").

As a parolee, Valjean is issued a yellow passport ("passeport jaune") with marching orders to Pontarlier, where he will be forced to live under severe restrictions. This document identifies him to all as a former convict and immediately brands Valjean an outcast wherever he travels. His life turns around when Bishop Myriel of Digne, from whom he steals valuable silverware, tells the police that he has given the treasure to Valjean. Out of this encounter, Valjean becomes a repentant, honorable, and dignified man. He becomes kind, a devoted father-figure to a girl, Cosette, who loses her mother, and a benefactor to those in need.

Although a known criminal and a parolee, Valjean yet grows morally to represent the best traits of humanity. Bishop Myriel tells him in Volume I that "if you emerge from that sad place with thoughts of hatred and of wrath against mankind, you are deserving of pity; if you emerge with thoughts of good-will and of peace, you are more worthy than any one of us." A few books later Victor Hugo describes that "[w]hat the Bishop had wished to make of him, that he carried out. It was more than a transformation; it was a transfiguration [...][he had] henceforth only two thoughts,—to conceal his name and to sanctify his life; to escape men and to return to God." Whenever Valjean's desire to remain concealed conflicts with his desire to sanctify his life, "[he] d[oes] not hesitate to sacrifice the first to the second—his security to his virtue." By the end of the novel, even the police officer Inspector Javert acknowledges that Valjean is "kneeling on the heights of virtue, more nearly akin to an angel than to a man."

His character foil, Javert, persecutes him throughout the novel. After Valjean saves his life, Javert is forced to reconsider the authoritarian worldview he has adopted all his life; there "takes place in him a sentimental revelation entirely distinct from legal affirmation, his only standard of measurement hitherto. (....) justice according to God, running in an inverse sense to justice according to men." This revelation that "authority might be put out of countenance, that the rule might be inadequate in the presence of a fact, that everything could not be framed within the text of the code" leads to his eventual suicide.

== In the novel ==
=== Part One: Fantine ===
Victor Hugo devotes the novel's first book to Bishop Myriel, a kind-hearted old clergyman in the town of Digne. The second book opens with the arrival of a stranger to the town of Digne, who is gradually revealed to be the ex-convict Jean Valjean. He searches for a place to stay the night and is repeatedly turned away because of his yellow passport, which marks him as a criminal. At last, he is taken in by the bishop, who trusts him, feeds him supper, and gives him a bed for the night.

Hugo then details Valjean's background. He was born sometime in 1769 in a small town and orphaned as a child. He became a pruner and helped support his widowed sister and her seven children. In the winter of 1795, when resources were scarce, Valjean stole a loaf of bread from a local baker by breaking the window. He was caught and imprisoned for five years in the Bagne of Toulon. He attempted to escape three times, and each time his sentence was lengthened by three years; he also received an extra two years for once resisting recapture during his second escape. After nineteen years in prison, he was released, but by law must carry a yellow passport that announces he is an ex-convict.

During the night, he awakens and steals the bishop's silverware and silver plates, and runs off. He is arrested and brought back to the bishop. However, the Bishop admonishes Valjean (in front of the police) for forgetting to also take the silver candlesticks that he'd given Valjean, reminding Valjean of his "promise" to use the silver to become an honest man, claiming to have bought Valjean's soul with it, withdrawing it from evil and giving it to God. Despite the Bishop's words, it is later revealed that the police marked the event down in Valjean's permanent record.

Bewildered and not understanding what the bishop is talking about, Valjean heads back out into the nearby mountains and meets a young traveling worker from Savoy named Petit Gervais. Valjean places his foot on a coin that Petit Gervais drops, then refuses to return it, despite Gervais' protests, and threatens to beat him. When the boy flees the scene and Valjean comes to his senses, remembering what the bishop told him, he is ashamed of what he has done and searches for the boy in vain.

Hugo introduces Fantine and explains how she came to be abandoned by her child's father. In late 1815, Valjean, now using the name Madeleine, arrives in Montreuil-sur-Mer. He revolutionizes the town's manufacturing and earns a fortune, which he spends mostly for the town's good, paying for the maintenance (including required staff) of hospital beds, orphanages and schools. He is appointed mayor after refusing the first time. He declines the king's offer to make him a Knight of the Legion of Honor.

Madeleine (Valjean) saves an old man named Fauchelevent from death. Fauchelevent had fallen beneath his wagon as his horse fell and broke two of its legs. Madeleine offers to pay anyone who could raise the wagon but nobody wants to risk his life climbing under the wagon. Madeleine turns pale, but gets down into the mud and lifts the wagon off Fauchelevent. Javert, who witnessed the scene, tells Madeleine that he had only known of one man capable of doing such a feat, and that was a convict doing forced labor in Toulon. Since Fauchelevent had earlier lost his business and now had a broken kneecap, Madeleine (Valjean) arranges a job at a convent for Fauchelevent. Valjean also buys the broken cart and horse as an excuse to give Fauchelevent money.

Later, Javert arrests Fantine, who has become a prostitute, when he sees her scratch and try to hit a Dandy named Bamatabois, who had taunted Fantine and thrown snow down her dress while she walked back and forth trying to get business. Valjean was told what had happened and knew that Bamatabois should have been the one arrested and ordered Fantine free. Javert knew only what he'd seen and was furious with Valjean for interfering with police work. When Valjean orders Javert to leave in front of Javert's squad, Javert leaves and denounces "Madeleine" to the prefect of police at Paris, saying that he suspects Madeleine is Valjean. Javert is told that he must be incorrect because the "real" Jean Valjean (who is in reality Champmathieu) had just been found.

Valjean takes Fantine to the local hospital (which is on the side of the mayor's house) and has her cared for. He learns of Cosette, Fantine's daughter, and tries to pay off the Thénardiers (who are abusing Cosette).

Javert then apologizes to "M. Madeleine", and tells him that the "real" Jean Valjean has been found and is to be tried the next day. Javert also asks that he be dismissed in disgrace by Valjean from his job for acting out of revenge incorrectly, saying that since he had been hard on others he could not be less harsh on himself but after Valjean repeatedly refuses, Javert says he will continue acting as police chief until a replacement can be found.

It is only here that the novel finally reveals Madeleine to be Valjean, a fact which was heavily foreshadowed before.

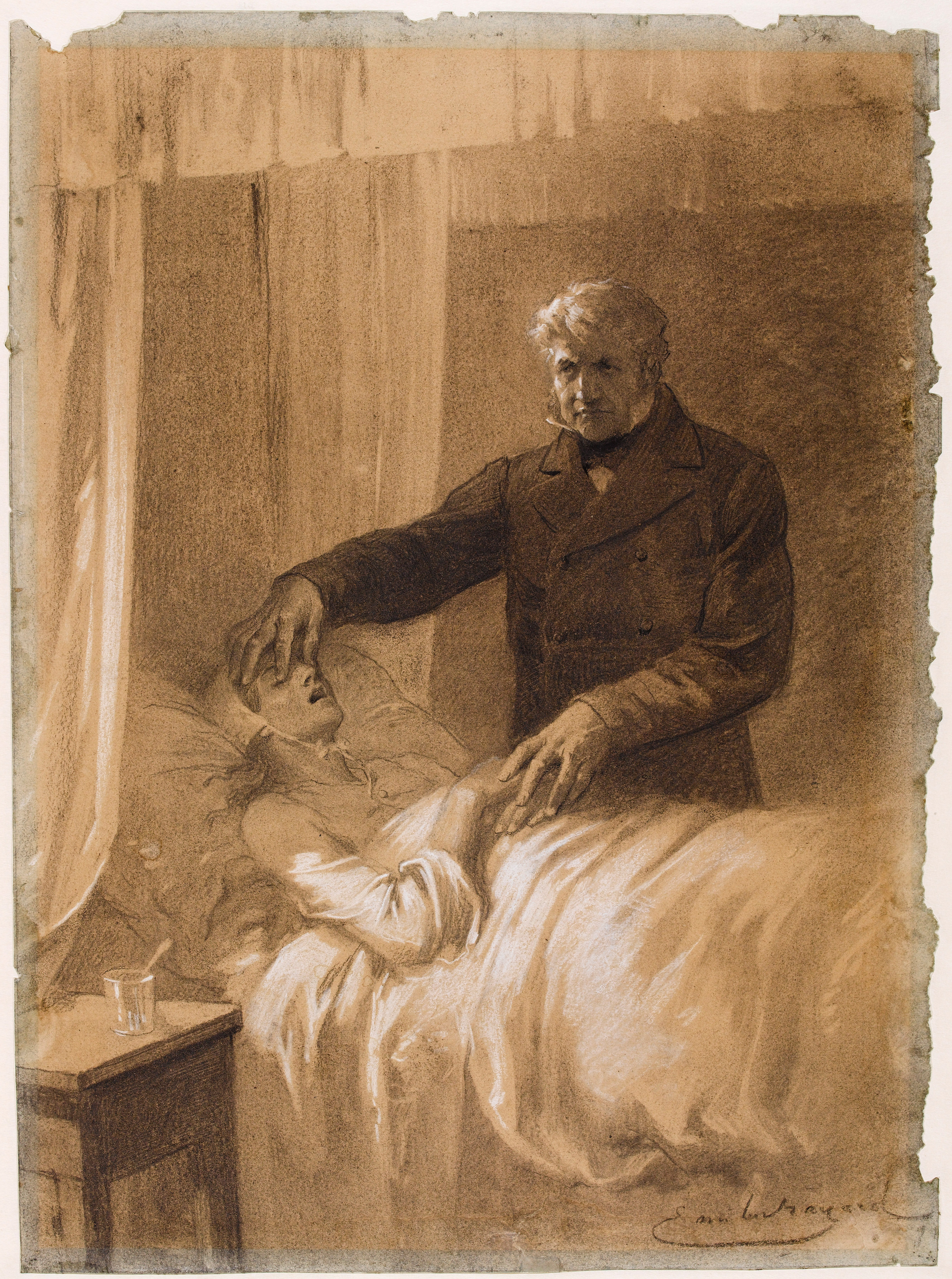
The death of Fantine; Valjean (as Monsieur Madeleine) closes her eyes.

That night, Valjean has a terrific struggle within himself, but finally decides to go to the trial and reveal his identity in order to free Champmathieu (for, if he gave himself up, who would care for Fantine or rescue Cosette?). He gives his evidence and proves that he is the real Jean Valjean, but nobody wants to arrest him, so Valjean says that they know where to find him and he returns to Montreuil-sur-Mer. The judge at the trial, although quite impressed with M. Madeleine's work and reputation, is shocked that Valjean, while mentioning a date that another convict had tattooed on himself (in order to prove that M. Madeleine was actually Jean Valjean) called Napoleon Bonaparte "the Emperor" instead of "Bonaparte" and orders Valjean arrested for robbing Petit Gervais. Javert comes to arrest him the next day while Valjean is in Fantine's room. Valjean asks for three days to get Cosette from Montfermeil and give her to Fantine before he is arrested but Javert refuses, saying that it would be too easy for Valjean to escape. Fantine (who'd been told by the doctors that Valjean, who'd been at the trial, had been getting her daughter) is shocked to learn that her daughter was not there already and that her savior is being arrested, and dies of shock (her body having been greatly weakened by her poor living conditions and long illness, probably tuberculosis).

Valjean allows Javert to arrest him, but quickly escapes. It is hinted that Valjean escapes with the help of a file hidden in a coin, an item he is later proved to possess. Valjean returns to his house to pack his clothes and hides behind the door when Javert comes looking for him. Sister Simplice, one of the hospital nuns, who has a reputation for never having told a lie in her life, lies in order to protect Valjean, and tells Javert that there is nobody there but her. Javert believes her and leaves, giving Valjean an opportunity to escape the town.

=== Part Two: Cosette ===
A short chapter, mainly consisting of two newspaper articles, informs the reader that Valjean has been re-arrested while getting into the stagecoach to Montfermeil (on his way to get Fantine's eight-year-old daughter, Cosette, whom he had promised to rescue). In July 1823, he was condemned to death for the 40-sous theft and the escape from the jail in Montreuil-sur-Mer, as the prosecutor claims that Valjean was part of a gang of street robbers and the latter refuses to defend himself. His sentence was graciously reduced by the king to only life in prison instead of death. Before he was captured, Valjean had already traveled near to Montfermeil and buried all the money he'd saved as M. Madeleine—a chapter tells of a worker in Montfermeil, a former Toulon convict, who claims having seen, according to a local fairy tale, the devil burying his treasure in the forest. No further explanation is ever given as to why, having buried his money near Montfermeil, Valjean had traveled back to Paris and then attempted to travel back to Montfermeil.

Valjean was assigned a new number of 9430, but escapes from a sailing vessel after only a few months' imprisonment, on 16 November 1823, by apparently falling into the sea after a daring rescue of a sailor who had gotten stuck in a dangerous situation up in the ship's rigging. Thereafter he is officially presumed dead.

Valjean goes to Montfermeil, where he meets Cosette alone in the forest on Christmas Eve, 1823. He accompanies her back to the inn; and watches that evening as the Thénardiers mistreat her very badly. He sees the Thénardiers' daughters Éponine and Azelma acting unkindly to her as well, tattling on her to their mother when she tries to play with their temporarily abandoned doll. After seeing this, Valjean briefly leaves the inn and returns with a beautiful new doll to give to Cosette, which she happily accepts. This makes Mme. Thénardier furious with Valjean, affronted that he would do such a thing for Cosette instead of her own daughters. M. Thénardier tells her that Valjean can do as he wishes as long as he pays them. That evening, Mme. Thénardier insists that Cosette will be turned out onto the street the next day.

The next morning, Christmas Day, Valjean offers to take Cosette with him. Mme. Thénardier immediately accepts, but M. Thénardier haggles for a compensation and gets 1500 francs in the end. Valjean takes Cosette with him. Only now does the book confirm that the mysterious man Cosette met is actually Valjean. M. Thénardier is soon overcome with grief at having sold Cosette too cheaply and runs after them. When M. Thénardier demands more money, Valjean gives him the note Fantine signed before she died, saying that the bearer of the note was authorized to take Cosette. M. Thénardier tries to continue following Valjean, but is soon frightened back to the inn.

Valjean takes Cosette to Paris, where they live in No. 50-52 Boulevard de l'Hôpital, in the so-called "Gorbeau House". They cannot live calmly for long—in Spring 1824, Javert, who has been promoted to the police in Paris, finds the house. He has heard of a "kidnapping" from Montfermeil and remembers Valjean's request of three days. He has also heard of a man, poorly dressed, who gives money to other poor people, the "beggar who gives alms", who had a granddaughter with him and who has been heard to say that she came from Montfermeil. Javert goes undercover, discovers that it is Valjean, and makes plans to arrest him.

Valjean recognizes Javert, and taking Cosette, walks out of the house and leaves. They barely manage to get away from Javert, who allowed Valjean to leave the house, believing that Valjean would take him to meet other criminals. Valjean managed to steal a rope from a streetlamp, climb a wall to a convent and pull Cosette up after him. They then climbed down a shed roof into a garden. it turned out that this was the convent where Fauchelevent worked, who wanted to return the favor and save Valjean's life this time. After almost burying Valjean alive in a scheme to get him out of the convent so that he could openly walk back into the convent, Fauchelevent was able to bring in his "brother" Ultimas (fr. Ultime) Fauchelevent (the real name of Fauchelevent's deceased brother). Cosette was admitted to the convent school.

=== Part Three: Marius ===
During this whole part, Valjean and Cosette are unnamed, as the action is seen from Marius Pontmercy's point of view. They are described only as a father and daughter, whom Marius notices on his daily walks in the Jardin du Luxembourg. He ignores them at first, but later he and Cosette fall in love. Marius stalks the two until Valjean is alerted that someone is stalking them and moves from his house in Rue de l'Ouest (today Rue d'Assas).

They meet again by pure luck, six months later: Valjean is known for his generosity. As "the generous man from the St-Étienne-church", Thénardier, Marius' neighbour, asks for charity. He recognises Valjean and decides to build a trap for him. Marius, overhearing the plans, denounces the plot to the police, unfortunately meeting Javert. Valjean walks right into the trap and attempts to escape Thénardier once he realizes this. Thénardier forces Valjean to write a letter to Cosette, instructing her to come with the bearer. Valjean, however, gives Thénardier a false name and address and manages to free himself of the ropes tying him with the help of a file concealed in a hollowed-out coin, which is found afterwards. He berates the gang for thinking that they could force him to tell something he does not want to tell and burns his own left forearm with the poker Thénardier had used to threaten him before surrendering to the gang. It is at that moment that Javert enters the scene. There are a lot of people and confusion in the room, and the room is dimly lit allowing Valjean to escape through an open window before Javert recognizes him.

=== Part Four: Saint-Denis ===
Only now is when Valjean's and Cosette's life during the last years revealed: They lived in the convent until Fauchelevent's death, and left in 1829; Cosette is fourteen years old. Valjean buys three houses (so that he will always have somewhere to flee to) in Rue de l'Ouest (today Rue D'Assas), Rue Plumet (today Rue Oudinot) and No. 7 Rue de l'Homme-Armé (today 40, rue des Archives), mostly living in Rue Plumet.

Valjean does not know that Cosette returns Marius' love and does not understand why Cosette seems less attached to "her grandfather" than before. He is happy to see that the brand wound he got during the attack makes her worry and care for him more. During one of their walks, they witness the passing of a chain gang being taken from Paris south. The event leaves a profound impression on Cosette and makes Valjean even more determined to stop his ward from learning about his past.

Marius, through Éponine, finds Cosette, stalks her house, leaves his daily love journal for her to find then one evening leaps over the gate and surprises her in the garden. They begin meeting every evening to gaze into each other's eyes. But it is also Éponine, jealous, who throws Valjean an anonymous note, telling him to move. Valjean, feeling threatened since the incident with Thénardier and since he believes there has been a man hiding in his garden, decides to move to England. He takes Cosette to the house in the Rue de l'Homme-Armé. This takes places during the first days of June 1832.

It is only there that he learns of Cosette's love for Marius when a young boy (Gavroche) delivers a letter from Marius to Cosette, which mentions that Marius is at the barricade and will die as he promised her, since she left without a forwarding address. Valjean has another long inward struggle, at first feeling relief about Marius' certain death, then guilt about his former feeling. He joins the rebellion without an actual decision about his following actions.

=== Part Five: Valjean ===
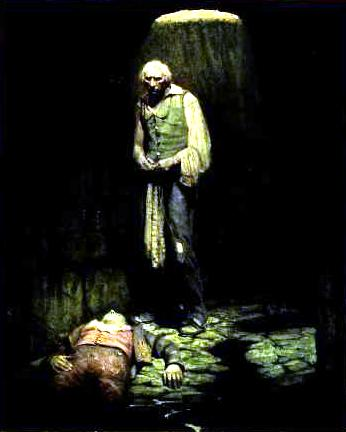
Valjean rescues Marius through the sewers. Illustration by Mead Schaeffer

Valjean plays his part in the insurrection and proves an excellent shot. To thank him, Enjolras, the barricade's leader, offers him anything he wants. Valjean asks that he be allowed to kill Javert, who has been captured as a spy. The request is granted and Valjean takes Javert out of sight to kill him but instead of executing him, sets him free, though Javert warns that he will still be bound to arrest Valjean. Valjean agrees and gives Javert his address. After Valjean releases Javert, the fighters on the barricades are all killed with the exception of Marius, whom Valjean carries to safety through miles of Parisian sewers. Valjean finds the sewer exit to the Grand-Caillou locked. Thénardier is there and has the key. He offers Valjean the key in return for payment, believing that Valjean had killed Marius for his money. Valjean gives the few sous he has to Thénardier and unlocks the sewer gate. He encounters Javert, now returned to duty and in pursuit of Thénardier. Valjean requests that Javert help him carry Marius to safety and Javert summons his carriage. Valjean asks permission to return home to say goodbye to Cosette and Javert agrees, saying that he will wait out front. As he walks up the stairs, Valjean looks out the window and notices that Javert is gone. Javert confronts his life spent in pursuit of a criminal who has demonstrated a sense of justice outside of the one that Javert has upheld his entire life. Unable to accept this, he commits suicide.

After recovering from his injuries, Marius receives permission from his grandfather to marry Cosette and they wed. The day after the wedding, Valjean reveals to Marius that he is an ex-convict. Marius, horrified, assumes the worst about Valjean's character and begins pushing him out of Cosette's life. After this, Valjean's previously habitual visits to Cosette at Marius' grandfather's house become shorter and shorter, until he ceases to visit at all, having become bedridden with loss of will to live. Some time after he stops coming, Thénardier visits Marius and claims that Valjean is a murderer and shows Marius several newspaper articles to prove this. Marius sees through Thénardier's disguise and, in an attempt to show Marius something that he does not already know, Thénardier shows newspaper clippings proving that M. Madeleine and Jean Valjean are the same person, and that Javert committed suicide. Marius is then told that Valjean was the man who had "assassinated" one of Marius' relatives, carrying the body through the sewers on 6 June. Realizing that Thénardier had seen Valjean saving him, Marius finishes with Thénardier and hurries with Cosette to Valjean's flat. Unfortunately, they are too late and find Valjean is dying. Valjean makes peace with Marius, with whom he had uneasy relations, and tells Cosette the name of her mother, Fantine. He dies content, under the light of the Bishop's candlesticks, and it is stated that an angel awaits to carry his soul to Heaven. He is buried in an unmarked grave, per his request, after death. An unknown person writes in pencil these four lines on the gravestone:

Il dort. Quoique le sort fût pour lui bien étrange,
Il vivait. Il mourut quand il n'eut plus son ange;
La chose simplement d'elle-même arriva,
Comme la nuit se fait lorsque le jour s'en va.

Translation:
He sleeps. Although his fate was very strange,
He lived. He died when he no longer had his angel.
The thing came to pass simply, of itself,
As the night comes when day is gone.

== Hugo's sources ==
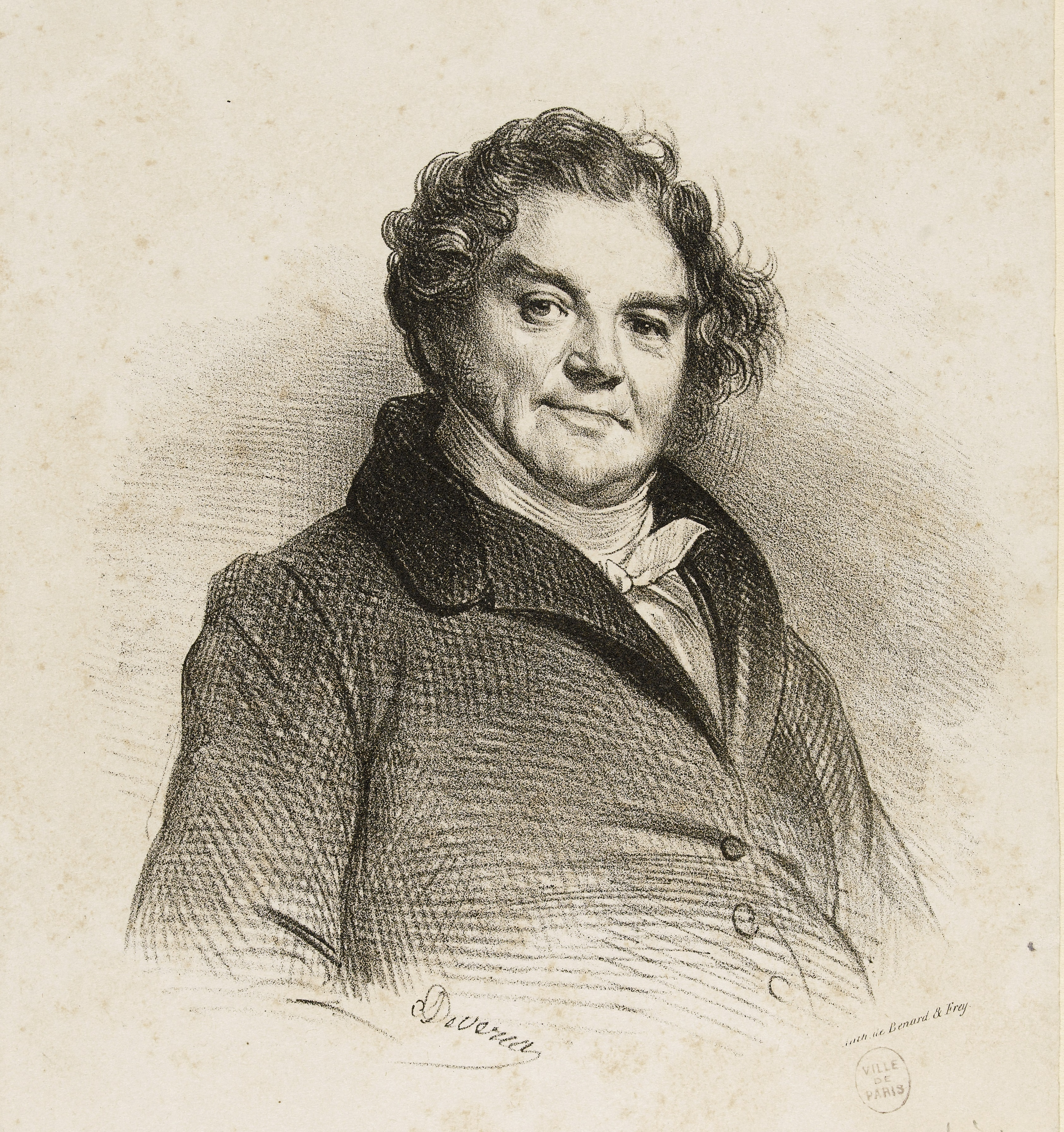
Eugene Vidocq, whose career provided a model for the character of Jean Valjean

Valjean's character is loosely based on the life of Eugène François Vidocq, an ex-convict who became a successful businessman widely noted for his social engagement and philanthropy. Vidocq helped Hugo with his research for Claude Gueux and Le Dernier jour d'un condamné (The Last Day of a Condemned Man). In 1828, Vidocq saved one of the workers in his paper factory by lifting a heavy cart on his shoulders as Valjean does. Hugo's description of Valjean rescuing a sailor on the Orion drew almost word for word on a friend's letter describing such an incident. On 22 February 1846, when he had begun work on the novel, Hugo witnessed the arrest of a bread thief while a duchess and her child watched the scene pitilessly from their coach.

The revolt of the university students is based on the 1832 June Rebellion.

In 1871, when Hugo was living in Brussels during the radical revolt known as the Paris Commune, anti-revolutionary mobs attacked his house and broke windows shouting "Down with Jean Valjean!"

== Musical ==
Les Misérables became an Award Winning musical in London, 1985.

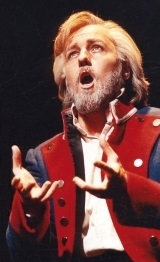
John Owen-Jones as Jean Valjean

=== Differences in the musical ===
- Javert frequently refers to Jean Valjean as "Prisoner 24601", which never happens in the book. The number appears only twice in the novel, and is never spoken by Javert. It is only the first prison code of Valjean in the novel, but his only code in the musical. It was chosen by Victor Hugo when he believed that he was conceived on 24 June 1801 (that is, 24-6-01).
- Valjean's assumed name, Monsieur Madeleine, is used in the original French language concept album, but not in the later English version of the musical, where he is only called Monsieur le maire (Mr. Mayor). In the 2012 film adaptation of the musical, the factory foreman breaks up the fight between Fantine and the factory workers, announcing "Monsieur Madeleine's here!". The assumed name can also be seen on the door of his office.
- In the novel, Valjean is arrested for the second time after confessing to being a parole-breaker in court. Javert later chases him for escaping from prison. In the musical, Valjean neither gets arrested again nor escapes from prison.
- Valjean and Cosette do not live in Gorbeau House and take refuge from Javert in a convent in the musical version, but the 2012 movie depicts Valjean inadvertently entering the convent with Cosette while escaping Javert, where he then encounters Fauchelevent. The Gorbeau House episode with the Thenardiers is also omitted in the musical and film adaptation. Instead, Thenardier lures Valjean into a trap on the streets with his gang and later attempts to rob him in his house, which is located on Rue Plumet.
- In Act 2, The First Attack, Valjean shoots a sniper who is attempting to kill Enjolras. It is unclear in the musical (due to the sniper being off stage) whether Valjean actually shoots the sniper or if he shoots the sniper's helmet to prevent him from killing Enjolras. In the novel, he shoots only at soldiers' helmets while at the barricade and purposely does not kill anyone.
- Valjean reveals his past to Marius before Marius and Cosette's wedding, and he also does not attend it. In the book, he does attend the wedding and confesses to Marius afterwards.

Given the high range of the role, particularly in parts of Bring Him Home, Valjean is most often played by a tenor.

== Adaptations ==
Since the original publication of Les Misérables in 1862, the character of Jean Valjean has been in a large number of adaptations in numerous types of media based on the novel, such as books, films, musicals, plays and games.

Many notable actors have portrayed the role on screen, including Fredric March, Jean Gabin, Frank Finlay, Georges Géret, Richard Jordan, Lino Ventura, Liam Neeson, Gérard Depardieu, Dominic West and Hugh Jackman, the last of whom received his first nomination for the Academy Award for Best Actor and won the Golden Globe Award for Best Actor – Motion Picture Musical or Comedy for playing Valjean in the 2012 film adaptation of the musical.

Onstage, the role has been played by many actors including Alfie Boe, Simon Bowman, Killian Donnelly, Alexander Gemignani, Ramin Karimloo, Peter Lockyer, Gary Morris, John Owen-Jones, Gerónimo Rauch, Jon Robyns, Drew Sarich, and Colm Wilkinson.
