= Earl Carpenter (actor) =

English actor, singer, producer

- Born: 9 May 1970 (age 56); Southampton, United Kingdom
- Occupations: Actor, singer, producer, director
- Known for: The Phantom of the Opera; Les Misérables
- Website: www.earlcarpenter.com

Earl Carpenter (born 9 May 1970) is an English musical theatre actor and singer, recognised chiefly for his work in London’s West End. He is known for his performances as Inspector Javert in the stage musical Les Misérables and as the title character in The Phantom of the Opera, both roles he has played on and off for two decades.

== Television ==
As part of the 25th anniversary of The Phantom of the Opera, Earl performed the title song at The Royal Variety Performance – held in The Lowry, Manchester – on Monday 5 December 2011. Performing alongside Nicole Scherzinger, Earl was joined by three other former Phantoms (Simon Bowman, John Owen-Jones, and Ramin Karimloo). The performance was aired on ITV1 on Wednesday 14 December 2011.

== Stage credits ==
=== Major Theatre Credits ===
Year	Title	Role	Theatre	Location
1995-1997	Les Misérables	Courfeyrac; Understudy Javert	Palace Theatre	West End
1997–1999	Beauty and the Beast	Ensemble; Understudy Beast; Understudy Gaston	Dominion Theatre	West End
1999	Beauty and the Beast	The Beast	Dominion Theatre	West End
2000-2001	The Witches of Eastwick	Ed Parsley; Understudy Darryl Van Horne	Theatre Royal Drury Lane	West End
2001	The Witches of Eastwick	Darryl Van Horne	Prince of Wales Theatre	West End
2001-2002	Sunset Boulevard	Joe Gillis	—N/a	UK National Tour
2003	Beauty and the Beast	Gaston	—N/a	UK National Tour
2003	The Secret Garden	Lord Archibald Craven	Byre Theatre	St Andrews; Scottish Premiere
2003	Chess	Anatoly Sergievsky	Bournemouth International Centre	Bournemouth
2003-2004	The Phantom of the Opera	Standby Phantom of the Opera	Her Majesty's Theatre	West End
2004	The Merry Widow	Count Danilo Danilovitch	—N/a	UK National Tour
2005-2007	The Phantom of the Opera	The Phantom of the Opera	Her Majesty's Theatre	West End
2008	Zorro: The Musical	Don Alejandro	—N/a	UK National Tour
2008-2009	Les Misérables	Inspector Javert	Queens Theatre	West End
2009-2010	Les Misérables	Inspector Javert	—N/a	25th Anniversary UK Tour
2010	Les Misérables	Inspector Javert	Théâtre du Châtelet	Paris
2010	Les Misérables	The Bishop of Digne	O2 Arena	London
2010-2011	We Will Rock You	Khashoggi	—N/a	UK National Tour
2011	Evita	Juan Peron	—N/a	European Tour
2011	The Phantom of the Opera	The Auctioneer	Royal Albert Hall	London
2011-2012	The Phantom of the Opera	The Phantom of the Opera	Her Majesty's Theatre	West End
2012	Les Misérables	Inspector Javert	Queens Theatre	West End
2012-2013	The Phantom of the Opera	The Phantom of the Opera	—N/a	25th Anniversary UK Tour
2013	Les Misérables	Inspector Javert	Princess of Wales Theatre	Toronto
2014	Les Misérables	Inspector Javert	Imperial Theatre	Broadway
2014-2015	Aladdin	Abanazar	Grand Opera House	Belfast
2015	The Phantom of the Opera	Emergency Phantom of the Opera	Her Majesty's Theatre	West End
2015	Les Misérables	Inspector Javert	Imperial Theatre	Broadway
2016	Les Misérables	Inspector Javert	—N/a	International Tour
2016	Ragtime	The Father	Charing Cross Theatre	Off-West End
2017	Moonfleet	Maskew & Turnkey	Salisbury Playhouse	Salisbury
2018	The Dreamers	Lionel Soloman	Abbey Road Studios	London
2019	Les Misérables	Bamatabois; Understudy Javert	Gielgud Theatre	West End
2019	Les Misérables	The Bishop of Digne / Bamatabois; Understudy Javert	Gielgud Theatre	West End
2019	Les Misérables	Inspector Javert	Gielgud Theatre	West End
2020	The Pirate Queen	Dubdhara	London Coliseum	West End
2020	Les Misérables	The Bishop of Digne / Bamatabois; Understudy Javert	Sondheim Theatre	West End
2021	Les Misérables	The Bishop of Digne; Understudy Javert	Sondheim Theatre	West End
2021-2022	Les Misérables	The Bishop of Digne / Claquesous; Understudy Javert	—N/a	UK & Ireland Tour
2022	Mandela	Prime Minister	Young Vic Theatre	London
2023	The Phantom of the Opera	The Phantom of the Opera	Her Majesty's Theatre	West End
2023	The Phantom of the Opera	Monsieur Gilles André	Politeama Rossetti	Trieste; Italian Premiere
2023	The Phantom of the Opera	Monsieur Gilles André	Tam Teatro Arcimboldi Milano	Milan; Also resident director
2023	The Phantom of the Opera	Monsieur Gilles André	Opéra de Monte-Carlo	Monaco
2025-2026	Les Misérables	The Bishop of Digne	—N/a	World Arena Concert Tour
