= Katie Hall (actress) =

English actress and soprano

- Born: 1990 (age 35–36); Oakham, East Midlands, England
- Other name: Katie Pycroft
- Years active: 2010–present

Katie Pycroft or Katie Hall (born 31 August 1990) is an English actress and soprano. She is known for her work in musical theatre.

== Early life ==
Hall was born in Oakham, Rutland in the English East Midlands. She attended Oakham School and went on to become a graduate of the National Youth Music Theatre. She also attended Peterborough High School for part of her senior education. Her parents, John Graham Hall and Helen Williams, were both professional opera singers.

== Career ==
Hall played Cosette in the 2010 25th-anniversary version of Les Misérables at The O2 Arena and Christine in The Phantom of the Opera in the UK tour in 2012. She also had a small cameo in the 2012 film production of Les Misérables. In 2013, she was cast as Maria in the UK tour of West Side Story. In 2015, she was chosen by the English National Opera to play Johanna Barker in Sweeney Todd: The Demon Barber of Fleet Street. From 2018 to 2022, she played Fantine in the UK and Ireland Tour of Les Misérables. In September 2023, she began playing Fantine in the West End production of Les Misérables. In December 2024, she took over the role in the Arena World Concert Tour of the show.

=== Theatre ===
Year	Title	Role	Theatre
2009–2010	Les Misérables	Cosette	Queen's Theatre; Europe tour The O2 Arena/25th Anniversary Concert
2011–2013	The Phantom of the Opera	Christine	UK Tour and Her Majesty's Theatre
2013	West Side Story	Maria	UK tour
2015	Sweeney Todd: The Demon Barber of Fleet Street	Johanna	London Coliseum/English National Opera
2015	Fiddler on the Roof	Hodel	Royal Albert Hall
2016–2017	Schikaneder	Maria Anna Miller	Raimund Theatre, Vienna
2018–2020; 2021–2022; 2023–2026	Les Misérables	Fantine	UK/Ireland tour Sondheim Theatre; Arena World Tour
2026	Cabaret	Sally Bowles	Playhouse Theatre

=== Film and TV ===
Year	Title	Role	Notes
2008	I'd Do Anything	Contestant	reality TV show
2009	Eurovision: Your Country Needs You	Contestant	reality TV show
2010	Les Misérables in Concert: the 25th Anniversary	Cosette	performed at the O2 Arena
2011	The Phantom of the Opera at the Royal Albert Hall	Ensemble	performed at the Royal Albert Hall
2012	Les Miserables	Turning woman 4	movie
