= Bishop Myriel =

Fictional character in Les Misérables

- Les Misérables character
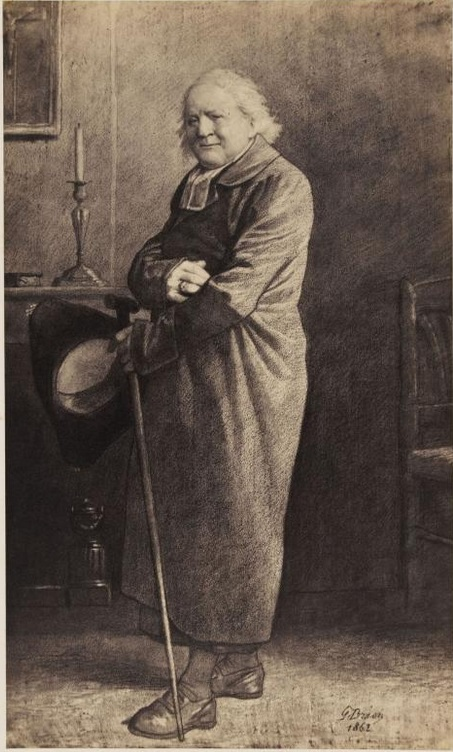
- Bishop Myriel, depicted by Gustave Brion, 1862
- Created by: Victor Hugo

In-universe information
- Full name: Charles-François-Bienvenu Myriel
- Nickname: Monseigneur Bienvenu
- Gender: Male
- Title: Bishop
- Occupation: Priest (Bishop)
- Family: Unnamed father (deceased); Unnamed General (brother); Unnamed Prefect (brother); Baptistine Myriel (sister)
- Spouse: Unnamed wife (deceased)
- Religion: Roman Catholic
- Nationality: French
- Born: 1739
- Death: 1821 (age 82)

Bishop Charles-François-Bienvenu Myriel, referred to as Bishop Myriel or Monseigneur Bienvenu, is a fictional character in Victor Hugo's 1862 novel Les Misérables. Myriel is the Bishop of Digne in southeastern France.

The actual Bishop of Digne during the time in which Myriel's appearance in the novel is set was Bienvenu de Miollis (1753–1843) who served as Hugo's model for Myriel. In the novel, as well as film and musical adaptions of it, the Bishop is a heroic figure who personifies compassion and mercy.

As Hugo set to work on the novel in 1848 after a long interruption, his anti-clerical son Charles objected to presenting Myriel as "a prototype of perfection and intelligence", suggesting instead someone from "a liberal, modern profession, like a doctor". The novelist replied:

I cannot put the future into the past. My novel takes place in 1815. For the rest, this Catholic priest, this pure and lofty figure of true priesthood, offers the most savage satire on the priesthood today.

== Bishop Myriel in the novel ==
The novel’s first fourteen chapters are an account of the life and practices of Myriel. He was born into a noble family: "the whole of the first portion of his life had been devoted to the world and to gallantry." His wife died while they were living in Italy as exiles from the French Revolution. The narrator reports his next transformation with a rhetorical question:

Was he, in the midst of these distractions, these affections which absorbed his life, suddenly smitten with one of those mysterious and terrible blows which sometimes overwhelm, by striking to his heart, a man whom public catastrophes would not shake, by striking at his existence and his fortune? No one could have told: all that was known was, that when he returned from Italy he was a priest.

While a little-known priest, he had a chance encounter with Napoleon and praised him, as a result of which he was made a bishop. He continues to act like a common, compassionate, country priest, generally known by the name "Monseigneur Bienvenu" ("welcome"). He moved into the small town hospital, so that the episcopal palace could be used as a hospital and keeps only a tenth of his salary for himself, spending the rest on alms. He once accompanied a condemned man to the scaffold, after the village priest refused to do so. Hugo devotes one chapter to a transformative episode for Myriel, in which the Bishop visits an old revolutionary on his deathbed. They discuss the politics and morality of revolution, and Myriel comes to marvel at his "spiritual radicalism", asking his blessing as he dies.

The narrator summarizes Myriel's philosophy:

There are men who toil at extracting gold; he toiled at the extraction of pity. Universal misery was his mine. The sadness which reigned everywhere was but an excuse for unfailing kindness. Love each other; he declared this to be complete, desired nothing further, and that was the whole of his doctrine.

One night Jean Valjean shows up at his door, asking a place to stay the night. Bienvenu graciously accepts him, feeds him, and gives him a bed. Valjean takes most of Bienvenu's silver and runs off in the night. The police capture Valjean and take him back to face Bienvenu. The police inform Bienvenu they have found the silver in Valjean's knapsack, and Bienvenu tells the police that he had given them to Valjean as a gift so they will not arrest him again. Valjean is surprised of Bienvenu's graciousness, and later sees the error in his ways. He chastises Valjean for not taking the silver candlesticks as well. After the police leave, Bienvenu tells Valjean to use the silver to become an honest man.

Myriel is referenced several times later in the novel. In 1821, Valjean, while serving as a mayor under the name Monsieur Madeleine, learns from a local newspaper of Myriel's death at 82, and wears mourning attire for some time. Not long after, as Valjean contemplates allowing Champmathieu to be convicted in his stead, a "terrible voice" tells him: "Destroy these candlesticks! Annihilate this souvenir! Forget the Bishop! Forget everything! Destroy this Champmathieu, do! ... Yes, it is well arranged thus. Ah, wretch!" The voice then warns that one person, presumably Champmathieu, will curse him if he follows that advice. The voice is not identified, but the passage implies that it is the recently deceased Myriel as it concludes with Valjean asking who is there:

There was some one; but the person who was there was of those whom the human eye cannot see. He [Valjean] placed the candlesticks on the chimney-piece.

Just before Valjean's death, when a female porter asks if he wants a priest, he replies "I have one," and points upward. The narrator adds: "It is probable that the Bishop was indeed a witness of this death-agony." The silver candlesticks, Myriel's gift to Valjean, are mentioned several times near the novel's end, and Valjean dies in the glow of their candles.

== Role and significance ==
Writing in The Contemporary Review in 1885, Margaret Oliphant welcomed Hugo's portrait of Myriel as a refreshing change from his depiction of religious life in The Hunchback of Notre Dame, a "surprise of sweetness and relief". Calling Myriel "the keynote of the wonderful tale", she considered all the adventures of Valjean and Javert "on a much lower level of art than the opening". She continued:

All the after-struggle is secondary to the great event of the beginning, which is the salvation of Jean Valjean, not from the law or the prejudices of society, but from the power of evil. Javert is an accident, though a striking one; the real matter is much higher; it is the work of Bishop Myriel, not of the penal code. It is the redemption of a soul; it is the struggle, first of the dominating sin with the dim risings of a better life [...]

Kathryn M. Grossman describes Myriel's work in transforming the lives of the poor as a moral "investment". His "fraternal demeanor thus corresponds to an economy marketing in souls." She continues:

By his theft, Jean Valjean shows that he is still chained to hatred and anger; by his generosity, Myriel operates a spiritual purchase (achète) that substitutes "goodwill, gentleness, and peace"—in other words, "God"—for this satanic mentality. While Christ alone can redeem (rachète) with the sacrifice of his life, his bishop can perform an equally effective exchange. In divesting himself of his silver, Myriel invests in Valjean. All he demands of the recipient is that he prove worthy of the promise that he could not have made in his prison of sin, but that he will have made following his liberation. Sublime fiction opens the way, as in Simplice's case, to a higher truth.

The Catholic writer Theresa Malcolm says that after Valjean leaves, "Monseigneur Myriel never again appears in the story, but he is the soul of the novel, he who sowed love where there was hatred, light where there was darkness."

== Adaptations ==
Since the original publication of Les Misérables in 1862, the character of Bishop Myriel has been in a large number of adaptations in numerous types of media based on the novel, such as books, films, musicals, plays and games.

Bret Harte parodied Les Misérables in his Condensed Novels. In this version, Myriel confesses to stealing his own candlesticks. When the police can take no action against him, "He had a charming ball and chain made, affixed to his leg, and wore it the rest of his life."

=== Bishop Myriel in the musical ===
In the stage musical of the same name, which is based on the novel, the role is called "Bishop of Digne" and the character is not otherwise identified. All of Myriel's history is omitted, and he is not mentioned by name after his encounter with Valjean, though his act of kindness toward Valjean guides the character throughout the show. He appears in the show's prologue and after Valjean is caught with his possessions having taken him in from the street he sees the opportunity to impart his values unto the protagonist. He explains to Valjean that his act of mercy was for a greater cause, instructs Valjean to use the silver "to become an honest man", and says that he has bought Valjean's soul for God.

Although his role is highly condensed compared to that of the novel, the Bishop retains the same heroic character and has a major significance in the story, moving Valjean to mimic the Bishop's strong values of kindness and mercy. At the end of the 2012 film (and recent stage revivals of the musical), he and Fantine are shown in the embrace of God and welcome Valjean into life after death. As well, the 2012 film has Myriel played by Colm Wilkinson, who originated the stage role of Valjean in 1985.

== Quotes ==
In Hugo's novel, Myriel tells Valjean:

Forget not, never forget that you have promised me to use this silver to become an honest man. ... Jean Valjean, my brother: you belong no longer to evil, but to good. It is your soul that I am buying for you. I withdraw it from dark thoughts and from the spirit of perdition, and I give it to God!

In a sermon, he preaches:

My brethren, be compassionate; behold how much suffering there is around you.

In the musical, Myriel sings to him:

But remember this, my brother
See in this some higher plan
You must use this precious silver
To become an honest man
By the witness of the martyrs
By the Passion and the Blood
God has raised you out of darkness
I have bought your soul for God!

In support of the Bishop's gracious posture and commission toward's Jean Valjean, Hugo goes on to quote this powerful line in the epilogue:

To love another person is to see the face of God.
