= Michael Ball discography =

This is the discography of English singer Michael Ball. Listed are all the singles and albums in order of their release with their United Kingdom peak chart positions.

== Albums ==
=== Studio albums ===
Title	Details	Peak chart positions			Certifications	Sales
Title	Details	UK	AUS	IRE	Certifications	Sales
Michael Ball	Released: 1992; Labels: Polydor; Format: CD, digital download	1	—	—	BPI: Gold	
West Side Story (with Barbara Bonney)	Released: 1993; Format: CD, digital download	33	—	—		
Always	Released: 1993; Format: CD, digital download	3	—	—	BPI: Gold	
One Careful Owner	Released: 1994; Format: CD, digital download	7	—	—	BPI: Gold	
First Love	Released: 1996; Format: CD, digital download	4	—	—	BPI: Silver	
The Musicals	Released: 1996; Format: CD, digital download	20	57	—	BPI: Gold	
The Movies	Released: 1998; Format: CD, digital download	13	—	—	BPI: Platinum	
In Concert - Royal Albert Hall/Christmas	Released: 8 November 1999; Label: Universal Music; Format: CD, digital download	18	—	—	BPI: 2× Platinum	
This Time... It's Personal	Released: 30 October 2000; Label: Universal Music; Format: CD, digital download	20	—	41	BPI: Gold	
Christmas	Released: 4 December 2000; Label: Universal Music; Format: CD, digital download	—	—	—	BPI: Gold	
Stage and Screen	Released: 2001; Format: CD, digital download	2	—	—	BPI: Gold	
Centre Stage	Released: 2001; Format: CD, digital download	11	—	—	BPI: Gold	
I Dreamed a Dream	Released: 2003; Format: CD, digital download	31	—	—		
A Love Story	Released: 20 October 2003; Labels: Parlophone; Format: CD, digital download	41	—	—		
Music	Released: 17 October 2005; Label: Universal Music TV; Format: CD, digital download	11	—	—	BPI: Gold	
One Voice	Released: 30 October 2006; Labels: Universal Music TV; Format: CD, digital download	22	—	—	BPI: Silver	
Back to Bacharach	Released: 22 October 2007; Labels: Universal Music TV; Format: CD, digital download	20	—	—		
Heroes	Released: 14 March 2011; Label: Universal Music TV; Format: CD, digital download	10	—	—		
Both Sides Now	Released: 25 February 2013; Labels: Union Square Music; Format: CD, digital download	8	—	73	BPI: Silver	
If Everyone Was Listening	Released: 17 November 2014; Labels: Union Square Music; Format: CD, digital download	21	—	—		UK: 38,960
Together (with Alfie Boe)	Released: 4 November 2016; Labels: Decca; Format: CD, digital download	1	45	36	BPI: 2× Platinum	UK: 672,143
Together Again (with Alfie Boe)	Released: 27 October 2017; Labels: Decca; Format: CD, digital download	1	—	40	BPI: Platinum	UK: 433,362
Coming Home to You	Released: 22 March 2019; Labels: Decca; Format: CD, digital download	1	—	—		
Back Together (with Alfie Boe)	Released: 8 November 2019; Labels: Decca; Format: CD, digital download	2	—	—	BPI: Gold	UK: 214,995
Together at Christmas (with Alfie Boe)	Released: 20 November 2020; Labels: Decca; Format: CD, digital download	1	—	44	BPI: Gold	UK: 160,388
We Are More Than One	Released: 7 May 2021; Labels: Decca; Format: CD, digital download	2	—	—		
Together in Vegas (with Alfie Boe)	Released: 28 October 2022; Labels: Decca; Format: CD, digital download	3	—	—		
Together at Home (with Alfie Boe)	Released: 8 November 2024; Label: Decca; Formats: CD, download, streaming	1	—	—		
Glow	Released: 22 May 2026; Label: Tag8; Formats: CD, download, streaming	9	—	—		
"—" denotes a recording that did not chart or was not released in that territory.

=== Compilation albums ===
Title	Details	Peak chart positions	Certifications
Title	Details	UK	Certifications
The Best of Michael Ball	Released: 1994; Labels: Polydor; Format: CD, Digital download	25	BPI: Gold
The Collection	Released: 26 April 1997; Labels: Spectrum; Format: CD, Digital download	2	BPI: Gold
Songs of Love	Released: 1998; Format: CD, Digital download	3	BPI: Silver
The Very Best of Michael Ball in Concert at the Royal Albert Hall	Released: 9 December 1999; Labels: Universal Music On Demand; Format: CD, Digital download	18	BPI: Gold
A Song for You	Released: 2003; Labels: Crimson; Format: CD, Digital download	157	BPI: Gold
Love Changes Everything - The Essential	Released: 24 October 2004; Labels: Universal Music TV; Format: CD, Digital download	21	BPI: Gold
Seasons of Love	Released: 2 January 2006; Labels: Music Club; Format: CD, Digital download	119	
The Silver Collection	Released: 31 May 2007; Labels: Spectrum; Format: CD, Digital download	42	
The Worthit Collection	Released: 2008; Labels: Woolworths Worthit!; Format: CD, Digital download	48	
Past & Present: The Very Best Of Michael Ball	Released: 9 March 2009; Labels: Universal Music TV; Format: CD, Digital download	11	BPI: Silver
Encore: Essential Songs of Stage, Screen & Love	Released: 29 March 2010; Labels: Spectrum; Format: CD, Digital download	—	
Solo & Apart: A Collection of Songs from Their Past (with Alfie Boe)	Released: 2017; Labels: Decca Records; Format: CD, Digital download	—	BPI: Gold
"—" denotes a recording that did not chart or was not released in that territory.

=== Video albums ===
List of albums, with selected chart positions
Title	Details	Chart positions	Certifications
Title	Details	UK	Certifications
The Musicals & More	Released: 10 March 1997; Label: Sony Music; Formats: DVD	2	BPI: Gold
Live At The Royal Albert Hall	Released: 6 November 2000; Label: Universal Pictures; Formats: DVD		BPI: 2× Platinum
This Time... It's Personal	Released: 13 November 2000; Label: Universal Pictures; Formats: DVD	3	BPI: Platinum
Live In London	Released: 8 November 2004; Label: Universal Pictures; Formats: DVD	6	BPI: Gold
Past & Present Tour - Live	Released: 23 November 2009; Label: Universal Pictures; Formats: DVD	3	BPI: Gold
Back Together: Live in Concert (with Alfie Boe)	Released: 16 November 2020; Label: BBC Studios; Formats: DVD	1	BPI: Platinum

== Extended plays ==
Title	Details	Peak chart positions
Title	Details	UK
If I Can Dream	Released: 1992; Format: Digital download	51

== Singles ==
Title	Year	Peak chart position	Certifications	Album
Title	Year	UK	Certifications	Album
"Love Changes Everything"	1989	2	BPI: Silver	
"The First Man You Remember"	1989	68		
"It's Still You"	1991	58		
"One Step Out of Time"	1992	20		
"If I Can Dream"	1992	51		
"Sunset Boulevard"	1993	72		
"From Here to Eternity"	1994	36		
"The Lovers We Were"	1994	63		
"Wherever You Are"	1994	80		
"The Rose"	1995	42		
"(Something Inside) So Strong"	1996	40		
"The Perfect Song"	2013	—		Both Sides Now
"Fight the Fight" (From "Here to Eternity")	2013	—		Both Sides Now
"What We Ain't Got"	2014	—		If Everyone Was Listening
"Somewhere" (with Alfie Boe)	2016	—		Together
"New York, New York" (with Alfie Boe)	2017	—		Together Again
"West Side Story Medley" (with Alfie Boe)	2017	—		Together Again
"He Lives in You" (with Alfie Boe)	2017	—		Together Again
"As If We Never Said Goodbye" (with Alfie Boe)	2017	—		Together Again
"You're The Voice" (with Alfie Boe)	2017	—		Together Again
"Bring Me Sunshine" (with The Rays of Sunshine Children's Choir & Friends and Alfie Boe)	2017	—		Non-album single
"The Greatest Show" (with Alfie Boe)	2019	—		Back Together
"Queen Medley" (with Alfie Boe)	2019	—		Back Together
"My Way" (with Alfie Boe)	2019	—		Back Together
"Something Inside So Strong" (with Alfie Boe)	2019	—		Back Together
"You'll Never Walk Alone" (with Captain Tom Moore & The NHS Voices of Care Choir)	2020	1		Non-album single
"Be The One"	2021	—		We Are More Than One
"—" denotes a recording that did not chart or was not released in that territory.
