= Alfie Boe discography =

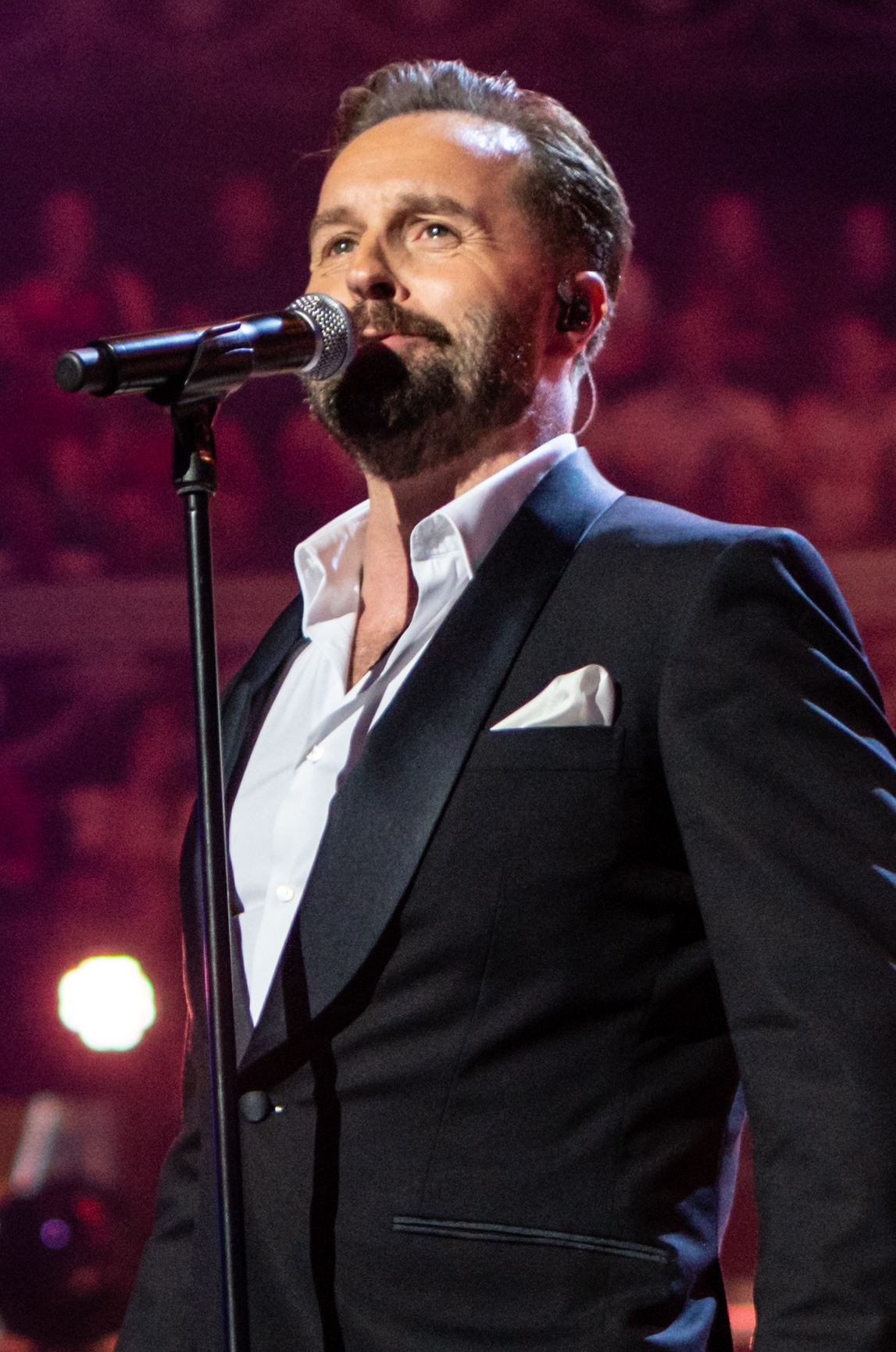
- Boe performing at The Queen's Birthday Party in 2018.
- Studio albums: 16
- Compilation albums: 2
- Singles: 4
- Video albums: 2

This is the discography of English singer Alfie Boe.

== Albums ==
=== Studio albums ===
List of albums, with selected chart positions
Title	Details	Chart positions			Certifications
Title	Details	UK	AUS	IRE	Certifications
Classic FM presents Alfie Boe	Released: 2006; Label: Classic FM; Formats: CD, download	90	—	—	
Onward	Released: 12 March 2007; Label: EMI Classics; Formats: CD, download	72	—	—	
La Passione	Released: 12 November 2007; Label: EMI Classics; Formats: CD, download	83	—	—	
Franz Lehar: Love was a Dream	Released: 2009; Label: Linn; Formats: CD, download	122	—	—	
Bring Him Home	Released: 27 December 2010; Label: Decca; Formats: CD, download	9	—	43	BPI: Platinum
Alfie	Released: 31 October 2011; Label: Decca; Formats: CD, download	6	—	—	BPI: Platinum
Storyteller	Released: 9 November 2012; Label: Decca, Brilliant; Formats: CD, download	6	—	—	BPI: Platinum
Trust	Released: 4 November 2013; Label: Decca, Brilliant; Formats: CD, download	8	—	96	BPI: Gold
Serenata	Released: 17 November 2014; Label: Decca; Formats: CD, download	14	—	—	BPI: Silver
Together (with Michael Ball)	Released: 4 November 2016; Label: Decca; Formats: CD, download	1	45	36	BPI: 2× Platinum
Together Again (with Michael Ball)	Released: 27 October 2017; Label: Decca; Formats: CD, download	1	—	40	BPI: Platinum
As Time Goes By	Released: 23 November 2018; Label: Decca; Formats: CD, download	10	—	—	BPI: Silver
Back Together (with Michael Ball)	Released: 8 November 2019; Label: Decca; Formats: CD, download, streaming	2	—	—	BPI: Gold
Together at Christmas (with Michael Ball)	Released: 20 November 2020; Labels: Decca; Format: CD, Digital download	1	—	44	BPI: Gold
Together in Vegas (with Michael Ball)	Released: 28 October 2022; Label: Decca; Formats: CD, download, streaming	3	—	—	
Open Arms – The Symphonic Songbook	Released: 27 October 2023; Label: Decca; Formats: CD, download, streaming	10	—	—	
Together at Home (with Michael Ball)	Released: 8 November 2024; Label: Decca; Formats: CD, download, streaming	1	—	—	
Face Myself	Released: 10 April 2026; Label: Ghostlight; Formats: CD, download, streaming, lp	32	—	—	
"—" denotes a recording that did not chart or was not released in that territory.

=== Compilation albums ===
List of albums
Title	Details	Certifications
The Stunning Tenor	Released: 2008; Label: Decca; Formats: CD	
You'll Never Walk Alone: The Collection	Released: 21 March 2011; Label: EMI Classics; Formats: CD, download	
Solo & Apart: A Collection of Songs from Their Past (with Michael Ball)	Released: 3 November 2017; Label: Decca, Universal; Formats: CD	BPI: Silver

=== Video albums ===
List of albums, with selected chart positions
Title	Details	Chart positions	Certifications
Title	Details	UK	Certifications
Alfie Boe Live - The Bring Him Home Tour	Released: 12 March 2012; Label: Universal Pictures; Formats: DVD, Blu-ray, download	2	BPI: Gold
Back Together: Live in Concert (with Michael Ball)	Released: 16 November 2020; Label: BBC Studios; Formats: DVD	1	BPI: Platinum

=== Album appearances ===
List of albums featuring Alfie Boe
Title	Details
Eternal Light: A Requiem	Released: 2008; Label: EMI Classics; Formats: CD
Downton Abbey: Original Music from the TV Series	Released: 13 December 2011; Label: Decca Records; Formats: CD, download
Home for the Holidays feat. Alfie Boe	Released: 15 October 2013; Label: Mormon Tabernacle Choir; Formats: CD, DVD, Blu-ray, download
Home Sweet Home	Released: 17 November 2014; Label: Decca Records; Formats: CD, download
Classic Quadrophenia	Released: 9 June 2015; Label: Deutsche Grammophon; Formats: CD, download
Les Misérables: The Staged Concert	Released: 2020; Label: First Night; Formats: CD, download

== Singles ==
Title	Year	Album
"Somewhere" (with Michael Ball)	2016	Together
"New York, New York" (with Michael Ball)	2017	Together Again
"West Side Story Medley" (with Michael Ball)	2017	Together Again
"He Lives in You" (with Michael Ball)	2017	Together Again
"As If We Never Said Goodbye" (with Michael Ball)	2017	Together Again
"You're The Voice" (with Michael Ball)	2017	Together Again
"The Greatest Show" (with Michael Ball)	2019	Back Together
"Queen Medley" (with Michael Ball)	2019	Back Together
"My Way" (with Michael Ball)	2019	Back Together
"Something Inside So Strong" (with Michael Ball)	2019	Back Together
