= If I Can Dream (disambiguation) =

"If I Can Dream" is a song made famous by Elvis Presley.

If I Can Dream may also refer to:

- "If I Can Dream" (album), a 2015 compilation album by American singer Elvis Presley
- "If I Can Dream" (web series), a webseries created by Simon Fuller
- If I Can Dream, a 1992 EP by Michael Ball

== See also ==
- I Can Dream (disambiguation)
