= Michael Ball (TV programme) =

- Genre: Entertainment
- Directed by: Ian Hamilton; Jonathan Glazier; Gavin Taylor
- Presented by: Michael Ball
- Country of origin: United Kingdom
- Original language: English
- No. of series: 2
- No. of episodes: 14

Production
- Executive producers: Trish Kinane; Stephen Leahy
- Producer: Ian Hamilton
- Running time: 30 minutes
- Production companies: Action Time; Carlton Television

Original release
- Network: ITV
- Release: 8 July 1993 – 24 December 1995

Michael Ball is a British music entertainment television programme presented by Michael Ball that aired on ITV from July 1993 to December 1995.

== Format ==
Each episode featured 2 special guests singing live in the studio. The guests were introduced as being "one of the best" within their genre of music which resulted in some high-profile guests like Ray Charles, James Brown, The Bee Gees and Take That to name a few. The show also featured performances from its host Michael Ball.

== Transmissions ==
Series	Episodes	Originally released	
Series	Episodes	First released	Last released
1	6	8 July 1993	12 August 1993
2	7	27 July 1994	7 September 1994
Christmas Special		24 December 1995	

== Episodes ==
=== Series 1 (1993) ===
No. overall	No. in series	Title	Guests	Directed by	Original release date
1	1	"Episode #1.1"	Ray Charles and Wet Wet Wet	Ian Hamilton	8 July 1993
2	2	"Episode #1.2"	Montserrat Caballe and Chris Isaak	Ian Hamilton	15 July 1993
3	3	"Episode #1.3"	Take That and Tammy Wynette	Ian Hamilton	22 July 1993
4	4	"Episode #1.4"	Elaine Paige and Cliff Richard	Ian Hamilton	29 July 1993
5	5	"Episode #1.5"	Harry Connick Jr. and Gloria Estefan	Ian Hamilton	5 August 1993
6	6	"Episode #1.6"	Dionne Warwick and The Bee Gees	Ian Hamilton	12 August 1993

=== Series 2 (1994) ===
No. overall	No. in series	Title	Guests	Directed by	Original release date
7	1	"Episode #2.1"	Cher and Tony Bennett	Jonathan Glazier	27 July 1994
8	2	"Episode #2.2"	Erasure and Joe Cocker	Jonathan Glazier	3 August 1994
9	3	"Episode #2.3"	James Brown and Lulu	Jonathan Glazier	10 August 1994
10	4	"Episode #2.4"	Marcella Detroit and Julio Iglesias	Jonathan Glazier	17 August 1994
11	5	"Episode #2.5"	Montserrat Caballe and Robert Palmer	Jonathan Glazier	24 August 1994
12	6	"Episode #2.6"	D Ream and Emmylou Harris	Jonathan Glazier	31 August 1994
13	7	"Episode #2.7"	Shirley Bassey and Daryl Hall	Jonathan Glazier	7 September 1994

=== Christmas Special (1995) ===
No. overall	No. in series	Title	Guests	Directed by	Original release date
14	1	"Christmas Special"	Michael Bolton and Dusty Springfield	Gavin Taylor	24 December 1995
