= I Can Dream (disambiguation) =

"I Can Dream" is a song by British rock band Skunk Anansie.

I Can Dream may also refer to:

- "I Can Dream" (Boyzone song), a 2018 song by Irish boy band Boyzone
- "I Can Dream", a song by Charlotte Church from the 2013 album Three

== See also ==
- If I Can Dream (disambiguation)
