= Both Sides Now (Michael Ball album) =

Studio album by Michael Ball
- Released: 25 February 2013
- Recorded: 2012
- Label: Union Square Music
- Producers: Nick Patrick; Steve Mac

Michael Ball chronology
Heroes (2011)	Both Sides Now (2013)	If Everyone Was Listening (2014)

Singles from Both Sides Now
- 1. "The Perfect Song" Released: 15 March 2013; 2. "Fight the Fight" Released: 3 June 2013

Both Sides Now is a studio album released by English singer Michael Ball. It was released on 25 February 2013 in the United Kingdom by Union Square Music. The album peaked at number 8 on the UK Albums Chart.

== Singles ==
"The Perfect Song" was released as the lead single from the album on 15 March 2013. "Fight the Fight" was released as the second single from the album on 3 June 2013.

== Track listing ==
All songs produced by Nick Patrick and Steve Mac.

No.	Title	Writer(s)	Length
1.	"Both Sides Now"	Joni Mitchell	4:31
2.	"The Perfect Song"	Andrew Lloyd Webber; Leslie Bricusse	2:57
3.	"I Won't Let You Go"	James Morrison; Steve Robson; Martin Brammer	4:02
4.	"The Closest Thing to Crazy"	Mike Batt	3:59
5.	"Love and Affection"	Joan Armatrading	4:32
6.	"Suddenly"	Alain Boublil; Claude-Michel Schönberg	3:07
7.	"I Will Always Love You" (From "The Bodyguard")	Dolly Parton	3:41
8.	"I Won't Send Roses" (From "Mack and Mabel")	Jerry Herman	3:27
9.	"Run"	Gary Lightbody; Jonathan Quinn; Mark McClelland; Nathan Connolly; Iain Archer	4:20
10.	"Love Don't Live Here Anymore"	Miles Gregory	4:15
11.	"Songbird"	Christine McVie	3:30
12.	"When She Loved Me"	Randy Newman	3:29
13.	"Fight the Fight" (From "Here to Eternity")	Tim Rice; Stuart Brayson	3:34
14.	"Make You Feel My Love"	Bob Dylan	3:32
15.	"Love Changes Everything" (with Il Divo)	Lloyd Webber; Don Black; Charles Hart	3:45

== Charts ==
Chart (2013)	Peak position
Irish Albums (IRMA)	73
Scottish Albums (Official Charts)	13
UK Albums (Official Charts)	8

== Certifications ==
Region	Certification	Certified units/sales
United Kingdom (BPI)	Silver	60,000^{^}
^{^} Shipments figures based on certification alone.

== Release history ==
Country	Date	Label	Format
United Kingdom	25 February 2013	Union Square Music	Digital download; CD
