= If Everyone Was Listening =

Studio album by Michael Ball
- Released: 17 November 2014
- Recorded: 2013
- Label: Union Square Music
- Producer: Nick Patrick; Michael Ball

Michael Ball chronology
Both Sides Now (2013)	If Everyone Was Listening (2014)	Together (2016)

Singles from If Everyone Was Listening
- 1. "What We Ain't Got" Released: 17 November 2014

If Everyone Was Listening is a studio album released by English singer Michael Ball. It was released on 17 November 2014 in the United Kingdom by Union Square Music. The album peaked at number 21 on the UK Albums Chart.

== Background ==
Talking about the album, Michael Ball said, "People will assume what a record is going to be like and they are loath to even give it a listen. I sometimes feel I want to release an album without people knowing it is me."

== Critical reception ==
Writing for the Daily Express, Clive Davis wrote the album proved "there is more to Ball than those anthems from Les Misérables. Reflecting his passion for Americana and the neglected corners of the singer-songwriter repertoire, the record might just be the best thing the singer has ever recorded."

== Singles ==
"What We Ain't Got" was released as the lead single from the album on 17 November 2014.

== Track listing ==
All songs produced by Nick Patrick and Michael Ball.

No.	Title	Writer(s)	Length
1.	"Bad Things"	Jace Everett	2:46
2.	"Simple Love"	Alison Krauss	3:35
3.	"I Won't Give Up"	Jason Mraz; Michael Natter	3:54
4.	"Jessie"	Joshua Kadison	4:19
5.	"Still the Same"	Bob Seger	3:10
6.	"You Needed Me"	Randy Goodrum	3:51
7.	"Stuck Like Glue"	Jennifer Nettles; Kristian Bush; Kevin Griffin; Shy Carter	4:11
8.	"The Climb"	Jessi Alexander; Jon Mabe	3:53
9.	"Need You Now"	Hillary Scott; Charles Kelley; Dave Haywood; Josh Kear	4:07
10.	"May You Never"	John Martyn	3:46
11.	"What We Ain't Got"	Travis Meadows; Travis Jerome Goff	3:32
12.	"If Everyone Was Listening"	Roger Hodgson; Rick Davies	3:59
13.	"Let It Be Me" (From "Dreamboats and Petticoats")	Pierre Delanoë; Gilbert Bécaud; Curtis Mann	3:09
14.	"Angel"	Sarah McLachlan	4:45
15.	"Falling Slowly" (From "Once")	Glen Hansard; Markéta Irglová	4:15

== Charts ==
Chart (2014)	Peak position
Scottish Albums (OCC)	26
UK Albums (OCC)	21

== Release history ==
Country	Date	Label	Format
United Kingdom	17 November 2014	Union Square Music	Digital download; CD
