= Trust (Alfie Boe album) =

Studio album by Alfie Boe
- Released: 11 November 2013
- Recorded: 2012
- Studio: Ardent Studios, Memphis, TN Strange Cargo, LA The Village Studio, LA
- Genre: Traditional pop; musical theatre
- Label: Decca Records
- Producer: Larry Klein

Alfie Boe chronology
Alfie (2012)	Trust (2013)	Serenata (2014)

Trust is the eighth studio album by Alfie Boe. It was released on 11 November 2013 in the United Kingdom by Decca Records. The album peaked at number 8 on the UK Albums Chart.

== Track listing ==
No.	Title	Writer(s)	Length
1.	"Keep Me in Your Heart"	Jorge Calderón, Warren Zevon	3:27
2.	"Many Rivers To Cross"	Jimmy Cliff	4:30
3.	"You've Got a Friend"	Carole King	4:41
4.	"If You Go Away"	Jacques Brel, Rod McKuen	5:26
5.	"Trust"	Steve McEwan, Chris Stapleton	3:28
6.	"God Give Me Strength"	Burt Bacharach, Elvis Costello	6:37
7.	"Glory Glory Hallelujah"	Traditional	5:02
8.	"Georgia on My Mind"	Hoagy Carmichael, Stuart Gorrell	5:34
9.	"Forever Young"	Bob Dylan	4:11
10.	"Rosie"	Traditional	5:12
11.	"The Dimming of the Day" (feat. Shawn Colvin)	Richard Thompson	3:57
12.	"Danny Boy"	Traditional	4:49
Total length:			57:05

== Credits ==
=== Musicians ===
- Jack Ashford - Tambourine
- Burt Bacharach - Composer
- Jay Bellerose - Drums, Percussion
- Alfie Boe - Arranger, Primary Artist, Vocals (Background)
- Jacques Brel - Composer
- Andy Butler - Double Bass
- Jorge Calderón - Composer
- Hoagy Carmichael - Composer
- Jimmy Cliff - Composer
- Shawn Colvin - Featured Artist
- Elvis Costello - Composer
- Michelle Djokic - Cello
- Bob Dylan - Composer
- Nina Flyer - Cello
- Connie Gantsweg - Violin
- Stuart Gorrell - Composer
- Gary Grant - Trumpet
- Candace Guirao - Violin
- Larry Hall - Trumpet
- Dawn Harms - Violin
- Patricia Heller - Viola
- Jerry Hey - Horn Arrangements
- Russ Hicks - Pedal Steel Guitar
- Dan Higgins - Saxophone
- Steve Hoffman - Trombone
- Clydene Jackson - Vocals (Background)
- Booker T. Jones - Organ
- Jan Ketchum - String Contractor
- Julie Kim - Violin
- Mia Kim - Violin
- Carole King - Composer
- Polly Malan - Viola
- Roy Malan - Violin
- Robin Mayforth - Violin
- Patrick McCarthy - Double Bass
- Charlie McCoy - Harmonica, Vibraphone
- Steve McEwan - Composer
- Rod McKuen - Composer
- Vince Mendoza - String Arrangements
- Emil Miland - Cello
- Emily Oderdonk - Viola
- Dean Parks - Guitar (Electric)
- Deborah Price - Violin
- Evan Price - Violin
- Barbara Riccardi - Violin
- Matt Rollings - Piano
- Wenyl Shih - Violin
- Leland Sklar - Guitar (Bass)
- Chris Stapleton - Composer
- Eric Sung - Cello
- Fred Tackett - Cuatro, Guitar, Mandolin
- Richard Thompson - Composer
- Meg Titchener - Viola
- Igor Veligan - Violin
- Natalia Vershilova - Viola
- Mark Volkert - Violin
- Vivian Warkentin - Violin
- Julia Tillman Waters - Vocals (Background)
- Maxine Waters - Vocals (Background)
- Gabe Witcher - Fiddle
- Ogura Yasushi - Violin
- Warren Zevon - Composer

=== Production ===
- Lorenzo Agius - Photography
- Mellissa Bradbury - Assistant Management
- Sarah Brunton - Product Manager
- Paul Chessell - Design
- CJ Eiriksson - Vocal Engineer
- Jill Ferris - Management
- Neil Ferris - Management
- Robert Gatley - Engineer
- Bernie Grundman - Mastering Engineer
- Karyn Hughes - A&R
- Andrea Johnson - Booking
- Leslie Ann Jones - String Engineer
- Nigel Jones - Legal Advisor
- Travis Kennedy - Mixing Assistant
- Chris Kershaw - Product Manager
- Heulwen Keyte - Booking
- Larry Klein - Arranger, Producer
- Tom Lewis - A&R
- Lennie Moore - Copyist
- Tim Palmer - Mixing
- Vanessa Parr - Assistant Engineer
- Sandy Robertson - Management, Production Coordination
- Rod Shearer - Engineer
- Vick Shuttleworth - Accounting
- Mike Wilson - Engineer

== Chart performance ==
=== Weekly charts ===
Chart (2013–14)	Peak position
Scottish Albums (OCC)	8
UK Albums (OCC)	8

=== Year-end charts ===
Chart (2013)	Position
UK Albums (OCC)	60

=== Certifications ===
Region	Certification	Certified units/sales
United Kingdom (BPI)	Gold	100,000^{*}
^{*} Sales figures based on certification alone.

== Release history ==
Country	Date	Label	Format
United Kingdom	4 November 2013	Decca Records	Digital download; CD
