= Alfie (Alfie Boe album) =

Studio album by Alfie Boe
- Released: 31 October 2011
- Recorded: 2010
- Genre: Traditional pop; musical theatre
- Label: Decca Records

Alfie Boe chronology
You'll Never Walk Alone - The Collection (2011)	Alfie (2011)	Alfie Boe Live - The Bring Him Home Tour (2012)

Alfie is the sixth studio album by Alfie Boe. It was released on 31 October 2011 in the United Kingdom by Decca Records. The album peaked at number 6 on the UK Albums Chart.

== Track listing ==
No.	Title	Length
1.	"Being Alive"	2:25
2.	"Maria"	2:39
3.	"When I Fall in Love"	3:25
4.	"The First Time Ever I Saw Your Face"	4:23
5.	"Song to the Siren" (feat. Robert Plant)	4:06
6.	"When You Wish Upon a Star"	4:03
7.	"Music of the Night"	4:56
8.	"Someone to Watch Over Me"	3:59
9.	"In My Daughter's Eyes"	3:22
10.	"Over the Hills and Far Away"	3:43
11.	"Empty Chairs at Empty Tables" (feat. Nick Jonas)	3:05
12.	"Wheels of a Dream"	4:02
13.	"It Was a Very Good Year"	4:35
14.	"Who Am I"	2:51
15.	"Bring Him Home"	3:42

== Chart performance ==
=== Weekly charts ===
Chart (2011–12)	Peak position
Scottish Albums (OCC)	8
UK Albums (OCC)	6

=== Year-end charts ===
Chart (2011)	Position
UK Albums (OCC)	46
Chart (2012)	Position
UK Albums (OCC)	176

=== Certifications ===
Region	Certification	Certified units/sales
United Kingdom (BPI)	Platinum	300,000^{^}
^{^} Shipments figures based on certification alone.

== Release history ==
Country	Date	Label	Format
United Kingdom	31 October 2011	Decca Records	Digital download; CD
