= Serenata (album) =

Studio album by Alfie Boe
- Released: 17 November 2014
- Recorded: 2013
- Genre: Traditional pop; musical theatre
- Label: Decca Records

Alfie Boe chronology
Trust (2013)	Serenata (2014)	Together (2016)

Serenata is the ninth studio album by Alfie Boe. It was released on 17 November 2014 in the United Kingdom by Decca Records. The album peaked at number 14 on the UK Albums Chart.

== Track listing ==
No.	Title	Length
1.	"Serenata Celeste"	2:47
2.	"Addio Sogni Di Gloria"	3:30
3.	"My Heart Is Yours"	3:32
4.	"Volare"	3:06
5.	"Luna Malinconia"	3:19
6.	"Buona Sera"	3:16
7.	"Arrivederci Roma"	3:10
8.	"Feneste Vascia"	3:13
9.	"Rondine Al Nido"	3:37
10.	"Firenze Sogna"	3:51
11.	"Chitarra Romana"	2:53
12.	"Non Ti Scordar Ti Me"	2:38
13.	"Mambo Italiano"	2:17

== Chart performance ==
=== Weekly charts ===
Chart (2014–15)	Peak position
Scottish Albums (OCC)	17
UK Albums (OCC)	14

=== Certifications ===
Region	Certification	Certified units/sales
United Kingdom (BPI)	Silver	60,000^{*}
^{*} Sales figures based on certification alone.

== Release history ==
Country	Date	Label	Format
United Kingdom	17 November 2014	Decca Records	Digital download; CD
