= Coming Home to You =

Studio album by Michael Ball
- Released: 22 March 2019
- Label: Decca Records
- Producer: Nick Patrick; Michael Ball

Michael Ball chronology
Solo & Apart: A Collection of Songs from Their Past (2017)	Coming Home to You (2019)	Back Together (2019)

Coming Home to You is a studio album released by English singer Michael Ball. It was released on 22 March 2019 through Decca Records. The album peaked at number one on the UK Albums Chart.

== Critical reception ==
Writing for BroadwayWorld, Amanda Prahl wrote "It's a shame that the album has these moments, because it really is a pleasant experience for the most part. Ball's love for the music is always evident, and his willingness to branch out into a different sound and into original sounds should be applauded. I only wish that the end results had been a little bit better-crafted. Ball deserves better - and so do fans."

== Commercial performance ==
On 29 March 2019, the album debuted at number one on the UK Albums Chart. Coming Home to You is Michael Ball's fourth UK number one album, his first solo number one album in the UK since his self-titled debut album in 1992. Talking to the Official Charts Company, he said, "It's the most exciting news! Thank you so much for supporting the album, to the fans who've connected with it and bought it. The hard work has been worth it and this is just the icing on the cake. Amazing!"

== Track listing ==
All songs produced by Nick Patrick and Michael Ball.

No.	Title	Writer(s)	Length
1.	"Home to You"	Michael Ball; Jack McManus	4:30
2.	"I Just Can't Help Believin'"	Barry Mann; Cynthia Weil	3:29
3.	"Tennessee Dreams"	Ball; Ben Earle	3:44
4.	"All Dance Together"	Ball; McManus	3:21
5.	"Sail On"	Lionel Richie	3:37
6.	"Goin' Back"	Gerry Goffin; Carole King	3:52
7.	"Miss You Nights"	Dave Townsend	4:14
8.	"Lost Without You"	Freya Ridings	3:46
9.	"To Love Somebody"	Barry Gibb; Robin Gibb	3:31
10.	"Love Is Like a Butterfly"	Dolly Parton	2:29
11.	"I'll Have to Say I Love You in a Song"	Jim Croce	2:23
12.	"Blood Red Moon"	Ball; Earle; Holly Partridge	3:41
13.	"Bright Eyes"	Mike Batt	3:54
14.	"When the Loving Was Easy"	Jimmy Webb	3:55

== Charts ==
Chart (2019)	Peak position
Scottish Albums (OCC)	1
UK Albums (OCC)	1

== Release history ==
Region	Date	Format	Label
Various	22 March 2019	Digital download; CD; streaming	Decca Records
