= Storyteller (Alfie Boe album) =

Studio album by Alfie Boe
- Released: 9 November 2012
- Recorded: 2011
- Genre: Traditional pop; musical theatre
- Label: Decca Records

Alfie Boe chronology
Alfie Boe Live - The Bring Him Home Tour (2012)	Storyteller (2012)	Trust (2013)

Storyteller is the seventh studio album by Alfie Boe. It was released on 9 November 2012 in the United Kingdom by Decca Records. The album peaked at number 6 on the UK Albums Chart.

== Track listing ==
No.	Title	Writer(s)	Length
1.	"Bridge Over Troubled Water"	Paul Simon	4:39
2.	"The Sun Ain't Gonna Shine Anymore"	Bob Crewe, Bob Gaudio	3:27
3.	"I Can't Help Falling in Love With You"	Hugo Peretti, Luigi Creatore, George David Weiss	2:37
4.	"It's Over"	Roy Orbison, Bill Dees	2:55
5.	"If I Can Dream"	Walter Earl Brown	3:11
6.	"Angie"	Mick Jagger, Keith Richards	4:43
7.	"Shine a Light"	Jagger, Richards	5:20
8.	"Everybody's Talking"	Fred Neil	2:55
9.	"It's Now or Never"	Wally Gold, Aaron Schroeder, Eduardo di Capua	4:00
10.	"Please Don't Let Me Be Misunderstood"	Bennie Benjamin, Gloria Caldwell, Sol Marcus	4:28
11.	"Angel from Montgomery"	John Prine	7:32
12.	"Wayfaring Stranger"	Traditional	5:11
13.	"Rank Strangers to Me"	Albert E. Brumley	7:29

== Charts and certifications ==
=== Weekly charts ===
Chart (2012)	Peak position
Scottish Albums (OCC)	9
UK Albums (OCC)	6

=== Year-end charts ===
Chart (2012)	Position
UK Albums (OCC)	34

=== Certifications ===
Region	Certification	Certified units/sales
United Kingdom (BPI)	Platinum	300,000^{‡}
^{‡} Sales+streaming figures based on certification alone.

== Release history ==
Country	Date	Label	Format
United Kingdom	9 November 2012	Decca Records	Digital download; CD
