= Heroes (Michael Ball album) =

Studio album by Michael Ball
- Released: 14 March 2011
- Recorded: 2010
- Label: Universal Music TV
- Producer: Nigel Wright

Michael Ball chronology
Encore: Essential Songs of Stage, Screen & Love (2010)	Heroes (2011)	Both Sides Now (2013)

Heroes is a studio album released by English singer Michael Ball. It was released on 14 March 2011 in the United Kingdom by Universal Music TV. The album peaked at number 10 on the UK Albums Chart.

== Track listing ==
All songs produced by Nigel Wright.

No.	Title	Writer(s)	Length
1.	"Let the Heartaches Begin"	Tony Macaulay; John Macleod	3:03
2.	"I'll Never Fall in Love Again"	Lonnie Donegan	4:10
3.	"Play Me"	Neil Diamond	3:40
4.	"Summer Wind"	Johnny Mercer	2:43
5.	"For the Good Times"	Kris Kristofferson	3:52
6.	"Misty"	Johnny Burke; Erroll Garner	3:29
7.	"When I Fall in Love"	Edward Heyman; Victor Young	3:52
8.	"You Don't Know Me"	Eddy Arnold; Cindy Walker	3:11
9.	"Weekend in New England"	Randy Edelman	3:36
10.	"New York State of Mind"	Billy Joel	4:17
11.	"Joanna"	Tony Hatch; Jackie Trent	3:44
12.	"I Can't Help Falling In Love With You"	Hugo Peretti; Luigi Creatore; George David Weiss	2:58
13.	"He'll Have to Go"	Joe Allison; Audrey Allison	2:19
14.	"For Once in My Life"	Ron Miller; Orlando Murden	2:38
15.	"Avenues and Alleyways" (Bonus Track: Duet with Tony Christie)	Mitch Murray; Peter Callander	3:19

== Charts ==
Chart (2011)	Peak position
Scottish Albums (OCC)	12
UK Albums (OCC)	10

== Release history ==
Country	Date	Label	Format
United Kingdom	14 March 2011	Universal Music TV	Digital download; CD
