= Together in Vegas (album) =

Studio album by Michael Ball and Alfie Boe
- Released: 28 October 2022
- Length: 51:43
- Label: Decca
- Producer: Nick Patrick

Michael Ball chronology
We Are More Than One (2021)	Together in Vegas (2022)	Together at Home (2024)

Alfie Boe chronology
Together (2020)	Together in Vegas (2022)	Open Arms: The Symphonic Songbook (2023)

Together in Vegas is the fifth collaborative studio album by English singers Michael Ball and Alfie Boe. It was released on 28 October 2022 through Decca Records. The album peaked at number three on the UK Albums Chart.

== Track listing ==
Together in Vegas track listing
No.	Title	Writer(s)	Length
1.	"Also Sprach Zarathustra, Op. 30"	Richard Strauss	1:14
2.	"Viva Las Vegas"	Doc Pomus; Mort Shuman	2:00
3.	"Luck Be a Lady"	Frank Loesser	4:32
4.	"Frankie Valli Medley"	Sandy Linzer; Peggy Farina; Denny Randell; Bob Crewe; Bob Gaudio; Barry Gibb; Judy Parker	6:19
5.	"The Gambler"	Don Schlitz	3:38
6.	"Sway"	Norman Gimbel; Pablo Beltrán Ruiz; Luis Demetrio	2:50
7.	"Just a Gigolo"	Roger Graham; Spencer Williams	4:41
8.	"Tom Jones Medley"	Burt Bacharach; Hal David; Paul Anka; Les Reed; Barry Mason; Gordon Mills; Curly Putman	7:10
9.	"A Man Without Love"	Roberto Livraghi; Mario Panzeri; Barry Mason; Daniele Pace	3:31
10.	"That's Life"	Dean Kay; Kelly Gordon	3:14
11.	"Ooh Las Vegas"	Gram Parsons; Rick Grech	3:33
12.	"American Trilogy"	Mickey Newbury	4:31
13.	"America"	Neil Diamond	4:30
Total length:			51:43

== Charts ==
Chart performance for Together in Vegas
Chart (2022)	Peak position
Scottish Albums (OCC)	3
UK Albums (OCC)	3
