= As Time Goes By (Alfie Boe album) =

Studio album by Alfie Boe
- Released: 23 November 2018
- Studio: Capitol (Hollywood)
- Label: Decca
- Producer: Nick Patrick

Alfie Boe chronology
Solo & Apart: A Collection of Songs from Their Past (2017)	As Time Goes By (2018)	Back Together (2019)

Singles from As Time Goes By
- 1. "As Time Goes By" Released: 14 September 2018; 2. "Sing Sing Sing" Released: 14 September 2018; 3. "The Way You Look Tonight" Released: 28 September 2018

As Time Goes By is the tenth studio album by English tenor Alfie Boe. It was released on 23 November 2018 by Decca Records. The album peaked at number ten on the UK Albums Chart.

== Background ==
The album mainly features recordings of songs from the 1930s. Boe has said of the album: "I knew from day one that I wanted it to be a New Orleans-style album with the vibe of the city. Even though the songs are mellow and chilled, the album has that style of playing that evokes a honky tonk piano."

== Track listing ==
No.	Title	Length
1.	"La Vie en rose"
2.	"Moonlight Serenade" (solo)
3.	"Sing Sing Sing"
4.	"Stompin' at the Savoy" (featuring Kara Tointon)
5.	"A Nightingale Sang in Berkeley Square" (featuring Brennyn Lark)
6.	"The Way You Look Tonight"
7.	"Minnie the Moocher" (featuring Kelsey Grammer)
8.	"As Time Goes By"
9.	"My Funny Valentine"
10.	"Ain't Misbehavin'"
11.	"Mood Indigo"
12.	"I Don't Stand a Ghost of a Chance with You"

== Charts ==
Chart (2018)	Peak position
Scottish Albums (OCC)	10
UK Albums (OCC)	10

== Certifications ==
Region	Certification	Certified units/sales
United Kingdom (BPI)	Silver	60,000^{‡}
^{‡} Sales+streaming figures based on certification alone.
