= Alfie Boe =

English actor and singer (born 1973)

Alfie Boe OBE
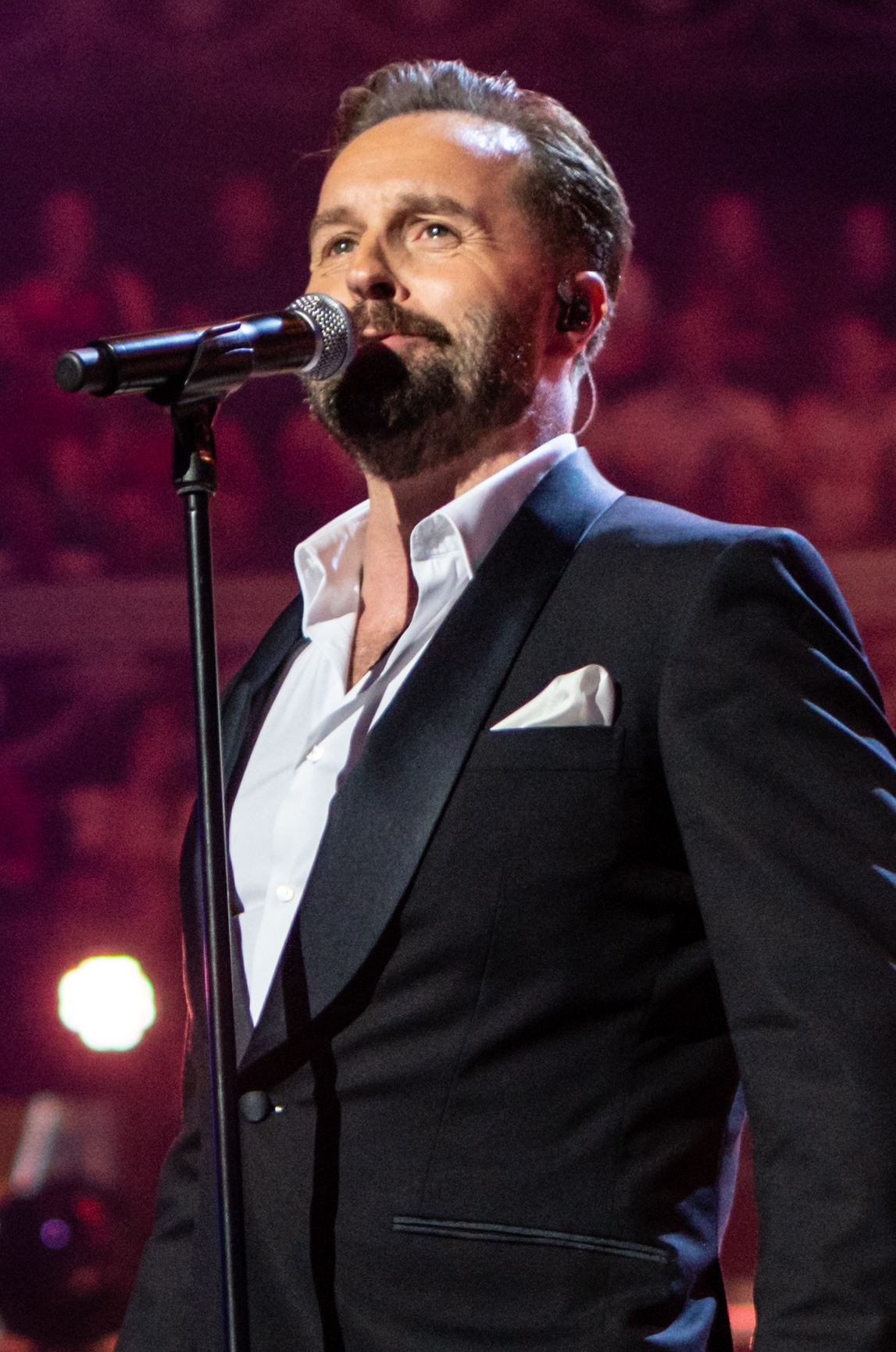
- Boe performing at The Queen's Birthday Party in 2018

Background information
- Born: Alfred Giovanni Roncalli Boe; 29 September 1973 (age 52); Fleetwood, Lancashire, England
- Genres: Classical crossover, operatic pop
- Instruments: Vocals; drums; guitar
- Years active: 1999–present
- Labels: Decca (UK), Manhattan (US)
- Website: www.alfie-boe.com

Alfred Giovanni Roncalli Boe (born 29 September 1973) is an English actor and singer who performs primarily in musical theatre.

Boe is best known for his performances as Jean Valjean in the musical Les Misérables at the Queen's Theatre in London, the 25th Anniversary Concert, the 2014 Broadway revival, the All-Star Staged Concert, and the Arena Spectacular World Tour. He played the lead role in Finding Neverland on Broadway beginning 29 March 2016. Boe shared a Tony Award with the other members of the ensemble cast of Baz Luhrmann's 2002 revival of La bohème in 2003. He has sold more than one million albums in the United Kingdom.

One of his most recent performances include Together in Vegas (with Michael Ball). In October 2022 he announced that he would be doing a solo tour in 2023.

== Early life ==
Boe, the youngest in a family of nine children, was born in Blackpool, Lancashire, and brought up in nearby Fleetwood. He is of Irish and Norwegian descent. His mother and father named him after the Italian name of Pope John XXIII. He attended St Wulstan's and St Edmund's School and Cardinal Allen Catholic High School in Fleetwood. His earliest musical memories were of listening to his father's Richard Tauber records and he discovered Puccini's La bohème for the first time.

Boe performed in public for the first time at the age of 14 at Fleetwood's Marine Hall in a "Songs from the Shows" presentation organised by a local singing teacher Lottie Dawson.

Aged 17, Boe became an apprentice mechanic at the TVR factory in Bispham, Blackpool. He enjoyed entertaining his colleagues by singing opera arias while he polished the cars, and one day was overheard by a client with connections in the music industry who was so impressed that he suggested Boe should go to London and audition for the D'Oyly Carte Opera Company. His audition was successful and he gave up polishing cars to embark on a singing career. Boe has not been able to trace the customer who suggested he go for the audition, having lost the man's business card.

== Singing and acting career ==
Boe moved to London and studied singing at the Royal College of Music, the National Opera Studio and the Royal Opera House's Vilar Young Artists Programme. In 1999 and 2000, he was featured as the "opera dude" on albums by the Clint Boon Experience, led by the former organist of the Inspiral Carpets. In 1999 he sang Ernesto for Scottish Opera in their Opera-Go-Round production of Don Pasquale, touring widely throughout Scotland.

=== Broadway and West End ===
Baz Luhrmann, who had spent two years looking for the lead for his Broadway production of La bohème, approached Boe for the role. Boe subsequently appeared (credited as Alfred Boe) on the 2002 Broadway Cast Recording released by Bazmark Live. Boe and the other principal leads received the Tony Honors for Excellence in Theatre in 2003. He has also sung the role at Glyndebourne and the English National Opera.

In 2006, Boe was signed to the Classic FM Presents label as their first signing in a new venture for the radio station, and his album Classic FM Presents Alfie Boe reached number three in the UK classical chart. At the 2006 Canterbury Festival, on 27 October, Boe performed with soprano Hayley Westenra at a concert in Canterbury Cathedral. In November 2006 he was signed to the EMI Classics label and his first album on that label, Onward, was released in March 2007.

Boe toured the United Kingdom with the Fron Male Voice Choir in February 2007 and took part in the first Classic FM webcast concert with soprano Natasha Marsh in March. The same month, he was appointed as an ambassador of the Prince of Wales Arts & Kids Foundation, a British educational charity working to inspire and educate children by introducing them to the arts. Boe's role being to bring music, and opera in particular for those children involved.

In April, Boe starred opposite Lesley Garrett and Willard White in the ITV Music of Morse concert at the Royal Albert Hall. He was also nominated for a Classical BRIT for Best Album, missing out to Paul McCartney at the ceremony on 3 May 2007.

Boe performed with Michael Ball in the English National Opera production of Kismet. His live performance of the song "Stranger in Paradise" from Kismet on the Michael Parkinson show was released as a download single on 25 June 2007. In August, Boe realised an ambition to record an album of Neapolitan songs which was released in November under the title La Passione. On 24 August 2007 he performed at the Arundel Festival alongside Natasha Marsh. On 19 October 2007 he performed at Canterbury Cathedral during the Canterbury Festival. Boe performed at the annual Festival of Remembrance at the Royal Albert Hall on 10 November 2007.

On 31 January 2008, Boe performed at the Pleasure Beach Arena, Blackpool to more than 1,600 local children in a special Music Quest concert to introduce the classics to a new generation. The concert celebrated the end of the Music Quest three-year project, which was sponsored by the Prince of Wales Arts & Kids Foundation and Classic FM MusicMakers.

From 29 March 2016 to 12 June 2016, Boe played the leading role of J. M. Barrie in Finding Neverland on Broadway.

From 7 April to 13 May 2017, Boe starred as the romantic lead Billy Bigelow in Rodgers and Hammerstein's Carousel in a limited run at the English National Opera directed by Lonny Price, opposite mezzo-soprano Katherine Jenkins.

=== Les Misérables ===
On 3 October 2010, Boe took the role of Jean Valjean in a concert performance of the musical Les Misérables at the O2 Arena in London to celebrate the 25th anniversary of the show, released on DVD and Blu-ray Disc. The concert encore performance of "Bring Him Home", credited as the "Valjean Quartet" – Boe with Colm Wilkinson, John Owen-Jones and Simon Bowman, each of whom has portrayed Valjean in various theatrical productions, was re-recorded at the Abbey Road Studios and released as a charity CD single and download on 13 December 2010. On 16 December 2010, Boe once again performed as Valjean in the Royal Variety Performance in front of Charles, Prince of Wales and Camilla, Duchess of Cornwall singing "What Have I Done?", and "Bring Him Home" again alongside Wilkinson, Owen-Jones and Bowman.

Boe appeared as Valjean in Les Misérables at the Queen's Theatre in London from 23 June to 26 November 2011. His friend Matt Lucas also joined the cast as Thenardier. During his run as Valjean, Boe appeared in the "Les Misérables v Lend Me a Tenor Battle of the Tenors" at Soho's Winnett Street in London on 13 July 2011. In August, Boe performed with the National Symphony Orchestra at Beau Sejour and Gloucester Hall.

In 2015, he reprised the role of Valjean in the Broadway revival of Les Misérables at the Imperial Theatre in New York City. He succeeded Ramin Karimloo, who played Enjolras in the 25th Anniversary concert, on 1 September 2015.

In February 2019, Boe announced he would reprise the role of Valjean at the Gielgud Theatre in a staged concert production of Les Misérables. Boe shared the role with John Owen-Jones and starred opposite Michael Ball (Inspector Javert); with whom he has performed on numerous occasions and Matt Lucas (Thénardier). The production opened on 10 August 2019, at the Gielgud Theatre and closed 2 December 2019.

In 2024, he shared the role of Valjean with Killian Donnelly in Les Misérables: The Arena Spectacular World Tour. He was joined by Ball and Bradley Jaden sharing the role of Javert. Boe performed the role in the UK, China, Australia, Royal Albert Hall, and Radio City Music Hall stops of the tour.

=== Other performances ===
In January 2011, Boe performed for English National Opera in La Bohème and The Mikado. In March 2011, Boe performed three concerts in Idaho: two in Rexburg, and one in Sun Valley. In April, Boe appeared in The Great British Musical – The Famous and the Future at the Criterion Theatre and the St George's Day celebration concert in Trafalgar Square. In May, Boe performed at the Classical BRIT Awards ceremony at the Royal Albert Hall, in the Isle of Man, and headlined the Hampton Court Palace Festival finale on 18 June 2011.

Boe appeared in the BBC Last Night of the Proms concert at the Caird Hall on 10 September 2011 and the Llanelli Choral Society's Grand Performance Concert at Tabernacle Chapel, Llanelli on 24 September 2011. Boe began the "Alfie Boe 'Bring Him Home' UK Concert Tour" in Bristol on 6 December 2011, finishing in Gateshead Sage on 4 February 2012.

In October 2011, Boe announced that he would appear in the Lytham Proms Festival Weekend on 4 August 2012. The festival is hosted in the town of Lytham St Annes, close to his hometown of Fleetwood. The local newspaper Blackpool Gazette described his concert as a homecoming, using the title 'Bring HIM Home'.

On 6 May 2012, Boe performed at the Kauffman Center in Kansas City, Missouri. On 4 June 2012, Boe performed at the Diamond Jubilee Concert for the Diamond Jubilee of Elizabeth II. He sang "'O sole mio" leading into Elvis Presley's "It's Now or Never". He also performed "Somewhere" from West Side Story with American soprano Renee Fleming on the balcony of Buckingham Palace. He appeared on The One Show on 30 August 2012. On 2 October 2012, Boe embarked on a major U.S./Canada concert tour starting in Dallas, Texas and ending in Toronto on 29 October.

In December 2012, Boe was featured as a guest artist for the holiday concert series of the Mormon Tabernacle Choir, Orchestra at Temple Square and Bells on Temple Square. The concerts also featured broadcaster Tom Brokaw, who narrated the story of Gail Halvorsen (who also made an appearance) and the candy bombers of the Second World War. Boe performed several Christmas favourites as well as "Bring Him Home". The live performances were recorded and released as Home for the Holidays feat. Alfie Boe.

Boe returned to the U.S. in late January 2013 for an eight-city tour, starting in Albany, New York 27 January and ending in Pittsburgh 9 February. In February 2013, Boe, colloquially known as the Lancashire Michael Bublé, was awarded two platinum albums by the BPI for Alfie (2011) and Bring Him Home (2010). Boe performed a three-week, 14-city tour, which started in Birmingham and ended in Belfast, Northern Ireland. On 15 April 2013, Boe was awarded a Fellowship of the Royal College of Music from his alma mater. On 26 May 2013, Boe sang "Bring Him Home" at the U.S. National Memorial Day Concert on the West Lawn of the Capitol in Washington, D.C.

In 2014 he recorded an orchestrated version of Pete Townshend's Quadrophenia, with the London Philharmonic Orchestra. He said "I've always thought the classical voice can lend itself to this kind of repertoire. It's harder than opera but thrilling to sing. The music is so full of excitement, positivity and strength – I wouldn't separate it from a symphony by Beethoven or Mozart" (liner notes). The album was released as Pete Townshend's Classic Quadrophenia.

Boe performed at VE Day 70: A Party to Remember at Horse Guards Parade in London on 9 May 2015.

On 4 and 5 June 2015, Boe performed two concerts at Symphony Hall with the Phoenix Symphony, filling in for Colm Wilkinson, who was forced to drop out due to illness.

=== Television ===
Boe appeared as music-hall singer Richard Chapman in an episode of Mr Selfridge. In 2016 and 2017, Boe and Michael Ball appeared in two ITV Specials, Ball & Boe: One Night Only and Ball & Boe Back Together. Boe replaced Aled Jones as presenter of Christmas Carols on ITV in December 2017. On 3 March, Boe performed in 'The End of the Show Show' on Ant & Dec's Saturday Night Takeaway alongside Michael Ball. Boe is a participant in the current reality competition series Freeze the Fear with Wim Hof.

In 2022, Boe appeared on ITV's Love Island singing for Davide and Ekin-Su as part of their final date.

== Personal life ==
Boe met his wife Sarah while rehearsing La Bohème in San Francisco. They married in 2004 and have two children. On 24 August 2020, Boe announced that he and Sarah had separated and that everything was "very amicable". In May 2022, Boe stated on BBC One that he had attempted suicide following the divorce from his wife and that he had also been hospitalized for five weeks for depression.

Boe is a member of the Grand Order of Water Rats. Boe was appointed Officer of the Order of the British Empire (OBE) in the 2019 Birthday Honours for services to music and charity.

== Notable theatre roles ==
Year(s)	Show	Role(s)	Notes
1999	Don Pasquale	Ernesto	Scottish Tour
2002-2003	La Bohème	Rodolfo	Broadway
2007	Kismet	The Caliph	English National Opera
2010	Les Misérables	Jean Valjean	West End
2010	Les Misérables	Jean Valjean	25th Anniversary Concert
2011	La Bohème	Rodolfo	English National Opera
2011	The Mikado	Nanki-Poo	English National Opera
2011	Les Misérables	Jean Valjean	West End
2015-2016	Les Misérables	Jean Valjean	Broadway
2016	Finding Neverland	J.M. Barrie	Broadway
2017	Carousel	Billy Bigelow	West End
2019	Les Misérables	Jean Valjean	West End
2020	Les Misérables	Jean Valjean	West End
2024-2026	Les Misérables	Jean Valjean	Arena Spectacular; World Tour

== Solo recordings ==
- Classic FM Presents Alfie Boe (Classic FM, 2006/Reissued with alternate cover photo, Universal Music, 2008/Reissued with alternative title The Sound of Alfie Boe as HMV exclusive on Decca, UK, February 2011)
- Onward (physical CD contains 12 tracks – some download versions feature an additional track "Where'er You Walk (from Semele)" – EMI Classics, 2007)
- A Living Prayer (Radio Edit)/Abide With Me (EMI Classics, 2007 – download single)
- Stranger in Paradise (Live on Parkinson)/You'll Never Walk Alone (EMI Classics, 2007 – download single)
- Live at Abbey Road – The Napster Sessions (Napster exclusive four-track download includes three live songs from "La Passione" and a cover of The Beatles' "Eleanor Rigby" – EMI Classics, 2007)
- La Passione (physical CD contains 15 tracks – some download versions feature an additional track "Lolita". Another track "La Paloma" recorded but not issued. EMI Classics, 2007)
- Franz Lehár: Love Was A Dream (Linn Records, 2009/Reissued as "Love Was A Dream" with new artwork on Decca, July 2011)
- Bring Him Home (studio version, credited as the Valjean Quartet – Alfie Boe, Simon Bowman, John Owen-Jones and Colm Wilkinson – Cameron Mackintosh Limited, 2010 – CD/download charity single)
- Bring Him Home (includes duets with Kerry Ellis & Matt Lucas, Shakira and Melanie C – Decca Records, December 2010)
- You'll Never Walk Alone – The Collection 16-song compilation CD features six songs not included on Boe's solo CD albums – two songs from Eternal Light, plus "Where'er You Walk", "Brindisi", "Abide With Me" and "Fratello Sole, Sorella Luna". (EMI Classics, 21 March 2011)
- Alfie UK version – 15 tracks, includes tracks featuring Michael Ball & Robert Plant (Decca Records, 31 October 2011)
- Alfie US version – 15 tracks, includes tracks featuring Nick Jonas and Robert Plant. The U.S. version substitutes the "Empty Chairs" duet from Michael Ball to Nick Jonas, and deletes "Have Yourself A Merry Little Christmas" replaced with the studio version of "Bring Him Home". (Decca Records, 5 June 2012)
- Storyteller UK version – 13 tracks (Decca Records, 12 November 2012)
- Storyteller UK download version – 16 tracks [adds "Always A Woman To Me", "I Can't Help Falling in Love With You (Secret Rehearsal Take)", and "Bring Him Home (Live Version)" plus four "Song Commentary" video clips (Decca Records, 9 November 2012 – Amazon.co.uk and iTunes UK]
- Storyteller UK Sainsbury's Entertainment version – 15 tracks (adds "Wayfaring Stranger – Bonus Track – Live From Dallas", and "Rank Strangers To Me – Bonus Track – Live From Dallas" (Decca Records, 12 November)
- Storyteller US version – 14 tracks includes exclusive bonus track "Angel" (Decca Records, 6 August 2013)
- Trust UK version – 12 tracks (Decca Records, 11 November 2013)
- Trust US version – 13 tracks – adds a bonus version of "Danny Boy" (Mr. Selfridge version) (Manhattan Records, 29 April 2014)

=== Also appears on ===
- "Johann Strauss: Die Fledermaus – Sung in English – D'Oyly Carte Opera Company, John Owen Edwards – conductor" (The first released studio recording of Alfred Boe – two-CD, Sony Classics S2K 64573, 1995)
- The Compact Guide to Pop Music and Space Travel (The Clint Boon Experience! aka CBX! – guest appearance on two tracks: "Comet Theme Number One" & "Only One Way I Can Go" – credited as Alf Boe: Opera Vocal – Artful Records, 1999)
- "Gilbert & Sullivan: HMS Pinafore – The 1999 D'Oyly Carte Cast Complete Dialogue & Songs Recording" (Performing the role of Ralph Rackstraw, credited as Alfred Boe – two-CD, TER, 2000 – Reissued 2008)
- Life in Transition (The Clint Boon Experience! aka CBX! – guest appearance on four tracks: "This is the Sound", "Life in Transition", "17 & Over!" & "In Chaos I See" – credited as Alf Boe: Opera Vocal – Artful Records, 2000)
- "The Most Happy Fella – First Complete Recording – Studio Cast" (three-CD Box Set – appears on six tracks, performing the role of Giuseppe, credited as Alfred Boe. Recorded 1997–1999 – JAY, 2000 – Reissued on TER, 2010)
- "Verdi: Aida – The 2002 Opera in English Recording" (two-CD Box Set – appears on two tracks in the role of "A Messenger" – credited as Alfred Boe – Chandos "Opera in English", 2002)
- "La Bohème – The 2002 Broadway Cast Recording" (credited as Alfred Boe – Bazmark Live Pty Ltd., 2002)
- "Barry Banks Sings Bel Canto Arias" (Alfred Boe as Pilades duets on "Palace of Horrors! – Ah, How Can I Hide the Flames" from Rossini's "Ermione", Recorded September 2001 – Chandos "Opera in English", 2004)
- "Sleigh Ride" (Alfred Boe appears on two tracks: "'Twas the Night Before Christmas" & "O Holy Night" – The Boston Pops Orchestra – Conducted By Keith Lockhart, Artemis Classics, 2004)
- "Myleene's Music For Romance" (Myleene Klass – two-CD Compilation features previously unreleased Alfie Boe track "Fratello Sole, Sorella Luna" written by Donovan from the Zeffirelli film "Brother Sun, Sister Moon" – EMI Classics, 2007)
- "Elizabeth Marvelly" (Self-titled debut CD features Alfie Boe duet on "Stranger in Paradise" – EMI, 2007)
- Howard Goodall, Eternal Light: A Requiem (tenor soloist on four tracks, with Natasha Marsh; Christopher Maltman; Choir of Christ Church Cathedral, Oxford; London Musici; and Stephen Darlington; EMI Classics, 2008)
- "Natasha Marsh" (Self-titled CD featuring Alfie Boe duet on "Brindisi" (La Traviata) – EMI Classics, 2008)
- "Pride of the Nation" (The Band of the Coldstream Guards, CD featuring Alfie Boe on "Jerusalem" (Parry, arr. Eyton) – Decca CD/DVD + Download, 28 March 2011)
- "Downton Abbey" (Original Music from the Television Series – Alfie sings two tracks "If You Were the Only Girl (In the World)" and "Roses of Picardy") – Decca CD + Download, 19 September 2011)
- "First Night" (Original Motion Picture Soundtrack – Alfie sings "Un'aura amorosa", duet "Volgi a me (Fra gli amplessi)" and appears on an ensemble track "Fortunato – Act II Finale", all from Mozart's "Così fan tutte" – Sony Classical CD + Download, 17 October 2011)
- "Summon The Heroes" (The Band of H.M. Royal Marines – Alfie sings "Over the Hills and Far Away" – Decca CD + Download, 14 November 2011)
- "One Vision" (Alfie Boe & Kimberley Walsh featuring Youth Music Voices Choir – Decca (UMO) UK Download Only, 11 May 2012)
- "Sing – E.P." (Gary Barlow & the Commonwealth Band Feat. Alfie Boe & Military Wives – Alfie sings on "Land of Hope and Glory" – Decca CD + Download, 28 May 2012)
- Home for the Holidays feat. Alfie Boe (Mormon Tabernacle Choir CD + Download + DVD, 15 October 2013)

== Discography ==
Studio albums

- Classic FM presents Alfie Boe (2006)
- Onward (2007)
- La Passione (2007)
- Franz Lehar: Love Was a Dream (2009)
- Bring Him Home (2010)
- Alfie (2011)
- Storyteller (2012)
- Trust (2013)
- Serenata (2014)
- Together with Michael Ball (2016)
- Together Again with Michael Ball (2017)
- As Time Goes By (2018)
- Back Together with Michael Ball (2019)
- Together at Christmas with Michael Ball (2020)
- Together in Vegas with Michael Ball (2022)
- Open Arms: The Symphonic Songbook (2023)
- Together at Home with Michael Ball (2024)
- Face Myself (2026)

== Awards and nominations ==
Year	Award	Category	Result	Ref.
2003	Tony Awards	Tony Honour for Excellence in Theatre (La bohème ensemble)	Won	
2008	Classic Brit Awards	Male Artist of the Year	Nominated	
2008	Classic Brit Awards	Album of the Year (Onward)	Nominated	
2011	Silver Clef Awards	PPL Classical Award	Won	
2018	Classic Brit Awards	Group of the Year (Note: Shared with Michael Ball)	Won	
2018	Classic Brit Awards	Classic FM Album of the Year (Together Again)	Won	
2021	Grammy Awards	Best Musical Theater Album (Les Misérables: The Staged Concert)	Nominated	
