= Together Again (Michael Ball and Alfie Boe album) =

Studio album by Michael Ball and Alfie Boe
- Released: 27 October 2017
- Label: Decca
- Producer: Nick Patrick

Michael Ball chronology
Together (2016)	Together Again (2017)	Solo & Apart: A Collection of Songs from Their Past (2017)

Alfie Boe chronology
Together (2016)	Together Again (2017)	Solo & Apart: A Collection of Songs from Their Past (2017)

Singles from Together Again
- 1. "New York, New York" Released: 22 September 2017; 2. "West Side Story Medley" Released: 29 September 2017; 3. "He Lives in You" Released: 6 October 2017; 4. "As If We Never Said Goodbye" Released: 13 October 2017; 5. "You're The Voice" Released: 20 October 2017

Together Again is the second collaborative studio album by English singers Michael Ball and Alfie Boe. It was released on 27 October 2017 through Decca Records. The album went to number one on the UK Albums Chart. As of September 2022, the album had sold 433,362 copies in the UK.

== Background ==
Following the commercial success of Together, which sold over 600,000 copies in the UK, Decca Records announced a "three-way" recording contract with Michael Ball and Alfie Boe in June 2017. Ball and Boe will return to the label as both solo artists and as a duo.

== Track listing ==
Standard version
No.	Title	Writer(s)	Length
1.	"West Side Story Medley"	Leonard Bernstein; Stephen Sondheim	8:04
2.	"As If We Never Said Goodbye"	Don Black; Christopher Hampton; Amy Powers; Andrew Lloyd Webber	5:22
3.	"The Prayer"	David Foster; Carole Bayer Sager	4:27
4.	"He Lives in You"	Lebo M; Mark Mancina; Jay Rifkin	4:41
5.	"Evermore"	Alan Menken; Tim Rice	3:09
6.	"The Rose"	Amanda McBroom	4:00
7.	"Bring Me Sunshine"	Arthur Kent; Sylvia Dee	3:54
8.	"Some Enchanted Evening"	Oscar Hammerstein II; Richard Rodgers	3:57
9.	"Hero"	Joe Keefe	3:18
10.	"Not While I'm Around"	Stephen Sondheim	3:47
11.	"Stranger in Paradise" / "And This Is My Beloved"	Robert Wright; George Forrest; Alexander Borodin	4:38
12.	"You're the Voice"	Andy Qunta; Keith Reid; Maggie Ryder; Chris Thompson	5:02
13.	"New York, New York"	Fred Ebb; John Kander	3:48
14.	"White Christmas"	Irving Berlin	3:05

Deluxe version (bonus tracks)
No.	Title	Writer(s)	Length
15.	"You'll Be Back"	Lin-Manuel Miranda	3:31
16.	"Once Upon a December"	Lynn Ahrens; Stephen Flaherty	2:55

== Charts ==
=== Weekly charts ===
Chart (2017)	Peak position
Irish Albums (OCC)	40
Scottish Albums (OCC)	2
UK Albums (OCC)	1

=== Year-end albums ===
Chart (2017)	Position
UK Albums (OCC)	7

== Certifications ==
Region	Certification	Certified units/sales
United Kingdom (BPI)	Platinum	300,000^{‡}
^{‡} Sales+streaming figures based on certification alone.

== Release history ==
Region	Date	Format	Label
Various	27 October 2017	Digital download; CD; streaming	Decca Records
