= Together (Michael Ball and Alfie Boe album) =

Studio album by Michael Ball and Alfie Boe
- Released: 4 November 2016
- Recorded: 2016
- Genre: Traditional pop, musical theatre
- Length: 57:45
- Label: Decca
- Producer: Nick Patrick

Michael Ball chronology
If Everyone Was Listening (2014)	Together (2016)	Together Again (2017)

Alfie Boe chronology
Serenata (2014)	Together (2016)	Together Again (2017)

Singles from Together
- 1. "Somewhere" Released: 14 October 2016

Together is a collaborative studio album by English singers Michael Ball and Alfie Boe. It was released on 4 November 2016 through Decca Records. The album peaked at number one the UK Albums Chart, becoming Ball's second UK number one album and Boe's first. Together has been certified double platinum by the British Phonographic Industry (BPI) for sales of 600,000 copies in the UK.

== Background ==
Michael Ball and Alfie Boe first met in 2007 while both starring in Kismet at the London Coliseum. The pair first performed together in the summer of 2007 at two BBC Proms concerts. Together was recorded in New York City and Prague with the Czech National Symphony Orchestra. Ball has said of the album: "We went into the project thinking we can play to our strengths and feel our way a bit, do the songs we love and find a way of re-presenting them. There are songs we’ve both done as solo artists and I much prefer singing them with Alfie. Something sonically happens when we’re both doing what we do. It’s unexpected and really moves me."

== Commercial performance ==
Together debuted at number two on the UK Albums Chart on 11 November 2016, selling 44,860 copies in its first week. In its fifth week on the chart, the album moved up to number one on the chart dated 16 December 2016, selling 96,643 copies. Together is Michael Ball's second UK number one album (the first being his 1992 debut album) and Alfie Boe's first. Together has become a commercial success, having sold over 40,000 copies for five consecutive weeks, the most for any album in 2016. Alfie Boe and Michael Ball are the oldest duo to top the UK Albums Chart, at 43 and 54 years old, respectively. As of September 2022, the album had sold 672,143 copies in the UK.

== Track listing ==
No.	Title	Writer(s)	Length
1.	"Les Miserables Suite" (medley of "Bring Him Home", "Empty Chairs at Empty Tables", and "I Dreamed a Dream")	Alain Boublil; Herbert Kretzmer; Victor Marie Hugo; Claude-Michel Schönberg	6:12
2.	"Somewhere"	Leonard Bernstein; Stephen Sondheim	3:15
3.	"Music of the Night"	Charles Hart; Richard Stilgoe; Andrew Lloyd Webber	4:57
4.	"Anthem"	Björn Ulvaeus; Tim Rice; Benny Andersson	3:25
5.	"Speak Softly Love"	Larry Kusik; Nino Rota	3:59
6.	"Tell Me It's Not True"	Willy Russell	4:30
7.	"Incurably Romantic"	Sammy Cahn; Jimmy van Heusen	4:19
8.	"Stairway to Paradise"	Buddy DeSylva; Ira Gershwin; George Gershwin	3:24
9.	"Wonderful World" / "Over the Rainbow"	George Weiss; Bob Thiele; Harold Arlen; E.Y. Harburg	4:01
10.	"For Once in My Life"	Ron Miller; Orlando Murden	3:26
11.	"A Thousand Years"	Christina Perri; David Hodges	4:12
12.	"When You Wish upon a Star"	Ned Washington; Leigh Harline	3:46
13.	"You'll Never Walk Alone"	Oscar Hammerstein II; Richard Rodgers	4:15
14.	"I'll Be Home for Christmas"	Kim Gannon; Walter Kent; Buck Ram	4:01

== Charts and certifications ==
=== Weekly charts ===
Chart (2016–17)	Peak position
Australian Albums (ARIA)	45
Irish Albums (IRMA)	36
Scottish Albums (OCC)	1
UK Albums (OCC)	1

=== Year-end charts ===
Chart (2016)	Position
UK Albums (OCC)	3
Chart (2017)	Position
UK Albums (OCC)	46

=== Certifications ===
Region	Certification	Certified units/sales
United Kingdom (BPI)	2× Platinum	611,330

== Release history ==
Region	Date	Format	Label
Various	4 November 2016	Digital download; CD; streaming	Decca Records
