= Together at Christmas (Michael Ball and Alfie Boe album) =

Studio album by Michael Ball and Alfie Boe
- Released: 20 November 2020
- Label: Decca
- Producer: Nick Patrick

Michael Ball chronology
Back Together (2019)	Together at Christmas (2020)	We Are More Than One (2021)

Alfie Boe chronology
Back Together (2019)	Together at Christmas (2020)	Together in Vegas (2022)

Together at Christmas is the fourth collaborative studio album by English singers Michael Ball and Alfie Boe. It was released on 20 November 2020 through Decca Records. The album peaked at number one on the UK Albums Chart.

== Background ==
In October 2020, Michael Ball and Alfie Boe announced details of their new album, Together At Christmas. The album features festive classics and one brand new original song titled "My Christmas Will Be Better Than Yours". Talking about the album Ball said, "Me and Alfie, together at Christmas, I can't think of anything better! In these strange times, we wanted to create an album of songs that we like to listen to at Christmas, plus a few surprises along the way, including an original song! Hopefully our fans will love listening to this for many years to come. This year it's certainly going to be a Christmas we'll never forget. Can't wait to see you all on tour in 2021." Alfie Boe said, "Keeping the Christmas spirit alive seems more important than ever this year. We wanted to create a festive album that brings joy, love and happiness. Spreading the Christmas cheer is something we all need a little extra of during these challenging times, so however people are going to be able to spend their holiday season, we'll be right here Back Together At Christmas with our fans who we are incredibly grateful for and can't wait to see in person when we're back for a brand new tour in 2021."

== Commercial performance ==
On 23 November 2020, the album was at number one on the Official Chart Update and was over 7,000 chart sales ahead of Be by BTS. On 27 November 2020, the album entered the UK Albums Chart at number one with sales of 32,882 in its first week, 96% of which were physical sales, the album became the duo's third number one together. Talking to the Official Charts Company, the duo said, "We just want to say thank you so much for getting us to Number 1, we really appreciate it. This is all for you – to bring you a bit of cheer this year. We’re sending lots of love, have a very Merry Christmas." Together at Christmas became Michael Ball's eleventh Top ten album in the UK and became Alfie Boe's ninth Top ten album in the UK. As of September 2022, the album had sold 160,388 copies in the UK.

== Tour ==
In October 2020 Michael Ball and Alfie Boe announced that they will go on a UK arena tour in 2021 to support the release of their new album. They are planning to head out on a 13-date arena tour in November 2021, culminating at London's O2 Arena on 19 December. Tickets for the shows went on sale on Friday 30 October.

Tour dates to promote Together At Christmas
UK and Ireland Tour
Date	City	Country	Venue
29 November 2021	Birmingham	England	Resorts World Arena
30 November 2021	Liverpool	England	M&S Bank Arena
2 December 2021	Brighton	England	Brighton Centre
4 December 2021	Bournemouth	England	International Centre
6 December 2021	Dublin	Republic of Ireland	3Arena
7 December 2021	Belfast	Northern Ireland	SSE Arena
9 December 2021	Leeds	England	First Direct Arena
11 December 2021	Aberdeen	Scotland	P&J Live
12 December 2021	Glasgow	Scotland	SSE Hydro
15 December 2021	Newcastle	England	Utilita Arena
16 December 2021	Manchester	England	AO Arena
18 December 2021	Nottingham	England	Motorpoint Arena
19 December 2021	London	England	The O2 Arena

== Track listing ==
All songs produced by Nick Patrick.

No.	Title	Writer(s)	Length
1.	"It's Beginning to Look a Lot Like Christmas"	Meredith Willson	3:07
2.	"Have Yourself a Merry Little Christmas"	Hugh Martin; Ralph Blane	3:52
3.	"Mistletoe and Wine"	Jeremy Paul; Keith Strachan; Leslie Stewart	3:32
4.	"Christmas (Baby Please Come Home)"	Ellie Greenwich; Jeff Barry; Phil Spector	2:48
5.	"I Believe"	Al Stillman; Ervin Drake; Irvin Graham; Jimmy Shirl	2:26
6.	"The Christmas Song (Chestnuts Roasting on an Open Fire)" (feat. Gregory Porter)	Mel Tormé	2:32
7.	"White Christmas" (From White Christmas)	Irving Berlin	3:04
8.	"Silent Night"	Franz Gruber	3:50
9.	"The Spirit of Christmas"		3:57
10.	"O Holy Night"	Robin Smith	4:48
11.	"I'll Be Home for Christmas"	Buck Ram; Kim Gannon; Walter Kent	4:01
12.	"My Christmas Will Be Better Than Yours"	Amy Wadge; Jack McMannus; Michael Ball	3:43
13.	"Once Upon a December"	Lynn Ahrens; Stephen Flaherty	2:51

== Charts ==
=== Weekly charts ===
Chart (2020)	Peak position
Irish Albums (OCC)	44
Scottish Albums (OCC)	1
UK Albums (OCC)	1

=== Year-end charts ===
Chart (2020)	Position
UK Albums (OCC)	18

== Certifications ==
Region	Certification	Certified units/sales
United Kingdom (BPI)	Gold	100,000^{‡}
^{‡} Sales+streaming figures based on certification alone.

== Release history ==
Region	Date	Format	Label
Various	20 November 2020	Digital download; CD; streaming	Decca
