= Back Together (album) =

Studio album by Michael Ball and Alfie Boe
- Released: 8 November 2019
- Label: Decca
- Producer: Nick Patrick

Michael Ball chronology
| Coming Home to You (2019) | Back Together (2019) | Together At Christmas (2020) |

Alfie Boe chronology
| As Time Goes By (2018) | Back Together (2019) | Together At Christmas (2020) |

Singles from Back Together
- 1. "The Greatest Show" Released: 4 October 2019; 2. "Queen Medley" Released: 25 October 2019; 3. "My Way" Released: 1 November 2019; 4. "Something Inside So Strong" Released: 7 November 2019

Back Together is the third collaborative studio album by English singers Michael Ball and Alfie Boe. It was released on 8 November 2019 through Decca Records. The album peaked at number two on the UK Albums Chart.

== Critical reception ==
Writing for BroadwayWorld, Amanda Prahl wrote "The excellent rise and flow of the first half of the album is chilled a little by the end, which is a pity. Even with these minor missteps, Back Together is mostly an enjoyable experience by two very distinctive, very talented singers of today."

== Commercial performance ==
On 15 November 2019, the album debuted at number two on the UK Albums Chart behind The Script's Sunsets & Full Moons. Back Together became Michael Ball's tenth Top ten album in the UK and became Alfie Boe's eighth Top ten album in the UK. As of September 2022, the album had sold 214,995 copies in the UK.

== Track listing ==
All songs produced by Nick Patrick.

| No. | Title | Writer(s) | Length |
|---|---|---|---|
| 1. | "The Greatest Show" | Benj Pasek and Justin Paul; Ryan Lewis | 3:55 |
| 2. | "Wishing You Were Somehow Here Again" | Charles Hart; Andrew Lloyd Webber | 3:52 |
| 3. | "Sunrise, Sunset" | Sheldon Harnick; Jerry Bock | 4:54 |
| 4. | "Circle of Life" (feat. Shaun Escoffrey) | Tim Rice; Elton John | 4:57 |
| 5. | "Come Fly with Me" | Sammy Cahn; Jimmy Van Heusen | 3:21 |
| 6. | "Queen Medley" | Freddie Mercury; Brian May; Roger Taylor; John Deacon | 5:56 |
| 7. | "My Way" | Paul Anka; Jacques Revaux; Claude François; Giles Thibaut | 4:41 |
| 8. | "Something Inside So Strong" | Labi Siffre | 4:09 |
| 9. | "I Will Always Believe" | Don Black; Jack McManus | 3:39 |
| 10. | "Let It Be Me" | Gilbert Bécaud; Manny Curtis | 3:23 |
| 11. | "Something's Gotten Hold of My Heart" | Roger Greenaway; Roger Cook | 4:38 |
| 12. | "Army" | Ben Earle | 4:33 |
| 13. | "Brothers In Arms" | Mark Knopfler | 5:07 |

== Charts ==
| Chart (2019) | Peak position |
|---|---|
| Scottish Albums (OCC) | 3 |
| UK Albums (OCC) | 2 |

== Certifications ==
| Region | Certification | Certified units/sales |
|---|---|---|
| United Kingdom (BPI) | Gold | 100,000^{‡} |
^{‡} Sales+streaming figures based on certification alone.

== Release history ==
| Region | Date | Format | Label |
|---|---|---|---|
| Various | 8 November 2019 | Digital download; CD; streaming | Decca Records |
