= Michael Ball =

English singer, presenter and actor (born 1962)

Michael Ball OBE
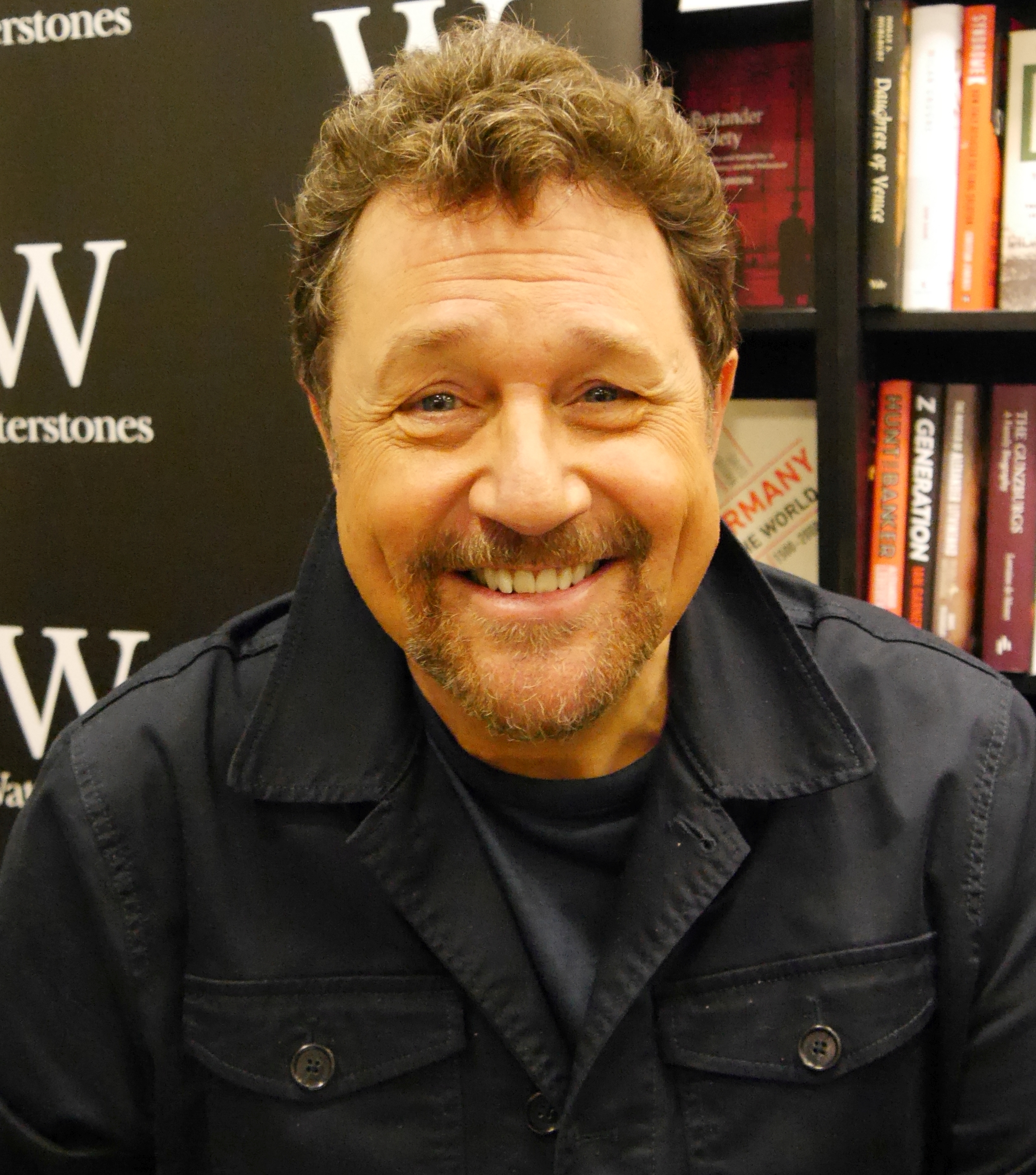
- Michael Ball, Waterstones, London, 2023
- Born: Michael Ashley Ball; 27 June 1962 (age 64); Bromsgrove, Worcestershire, England
- Education: Guildford School of Acting
- Occupations: Singer; actor; presenter; author
- Years active: 1984–present
- Known for: Les Misérables; Aspects of Love; Hairspray
- Partner(s): Cathy McGowan (1992–present)
- Musical career
- Genres: Pop; soft rock; musical theatre; easy listening
- Label: Universal
- Website: michaelball.co.uk

Michael Ashley Ball OBE (born 27 June 1962) is an English singer, presenter and actor. In 1985, he made his West End debut as Marius Pontmercy in the original production of Les Misérables. In 1989, he reached number two in the UK singles chart with "Love Changes Everything", from the musical Aspects of Love, where he played Alex Dillingham. He played the role in the West End and on Broadway. His album Coming Home To You reached number one in the UK making it his 4th number one album to date. On 24 April 2020, Ball and Captain Tom Moore entered the UK singles chart at number one with a cover of "You'll Never Walk Alone", with combined chart sales of 82,000 making it the fastest-selling single of 2020. In 1992, Ball represented the United Kingdom in the Eurovision Song Contest, finishing second with the song "One Step Out of Time".

In 1995, he reprised his West End role of Marius in Les Misérables: The Dream Cast in Concert. His other West End credits include Raoul de Chagny in The Phantom of the Opera (1987), Giorgio Bachetti in Passion (1996), and Caractacus Potts in Chitty Chitty Bang Bang (2002). In 2004, he played Jean Valjean in a concert performance of Les Misérables for the Queen at Windsor Castle. He has twice won the Laurence Olivier Award for Best Actor in a Musical. He won in 2008 for his role as Edna Turnblad in Hairspray, and then in 2013 for the title role in the revival of Sweeney Todd: The Demon Barber of Fleet Street. In 2018, he played Anatoly Sergievsky in the West End revival of Chess, and he returned to Les Misérables in 2019 and 2020 as Inspector Javert. He reprised his role of Edna Turnblad in the 2021 revival of Hairspray and in 2023 played the other leading male role of Sir George Dillingham in a revival of Aspects of Love. In 2024, Ball reprised the role of Javert in Les Misérables: The Arena Spectacular World Tour.

Ball was appointed Officer of the Order of the British Empire (OBE) in the 2015 Birthday Honours for his services to musical theatre.

== Early life and education ==
Ball was born in Bromsgrove, Worcestershire, to a Welsh mother and an English father. His father Tony, who originally wanted to be an actor, trained as an Austin apprentice at the Longbridge plant and progressed to become head of global sales at British Leyland. He was awarded an MBE for services to industry. Ball's maternal grandfather was a coal miner. Ball has a brother, Kevin, four years his senior and a sister, Katherine, almost a decade his junior. He moved to Dartmoor with his parents when he was three years old. He has never had singing lessons, but as a boy he learned to sing by singing along to music, for example; songs by Ella Fitzgerald, Mahalia Jackson and Frank Sinatra. When he was 11 years old he went to Plymouth College, an independent boarding school, because his parents thought this would give him a good education. However this made him unhappy, as he did not fit into the academic and sporting environment at the school at that time. He did join his fellow junior boarders on Sunday morning at the Pathfinder bible group in St Andrew's church. One summer he went to Pathfinder camp on the isle of Jersey.

Ball was interested in the theatre and his father took him to see shows in the school holidays, including a Royal Shakespeare Company production at the Royal Shakespeare Theatre of King Lear, which impressed him as a youngster of about 14 years' age. He joined a youth theatre, which led to his studying drama at Guildford School of Acting, where he found an environment that suited him. As a student he went busking on Saturdays in Guildford town with a female student friend to earn a little extra money. He graduated in 1984. After his graduation, Ball's singing career rapidly got off the ground. His maternal grandmother, having a musical ear, was proud of Ball's early singing achievements; she died suddenly, however, of a heart attack about one week before his debut in The Pirates of Penzance.

== Theatre ==
In 1984, after he had left drama school, Ball's first part was in Godspell at Aberystwyth Arts Centre, after which he worked for a few months in rep in Basingstoke, but his first major break was a star part in the production of The Pirates of Penzance at Manchester Opera House; at an open audition he was selected from about 600 applicants who formed a queue to do singing, acting, and dancing interviews, which were held in three separate rooms. His next important role came when Cameron Mackintosh cast him as Marius in the original London cast of Les Misérables, but he caught glandular fever and he took seven weeks off sick to recover from the associated tonsillitis and post-viral fatigue. When he returned to work he was still suffering from fatigue, and began to get on-stage panic attacks — overwhelming anxiety, a rapid heartbeat, sweating, and problems with vision. These also started happening at other times, such as when he was going to work. For most of the next nine months he lived alone in his flat feeling depressed; he did not seek therapy and left Les Misérables.

Thames Television invited Ball to sing during the Miss England contest, a live televised event, and he sang well enough despite suffering from anxiety. When he viewed a recording later, he realised that no one would have noticed how nervous he was, and he became less worried about his anxiety problem. At about that time, Cameron Mackintosh asked Ball to play Raoul in the second casting of The Phantom of the Opera in London, which was necessary after Michael Crawford (who played the Phantom) and Steve Barton (who played Raoul) left the London show to appear in the Broadway staging in New York City. Mackintosh thought that Ball would not be under too much pressure as Raoul, and that the part was right for him.

Ball played Alex in Aspects of Love, both in London and New York, and Giorgio in the London production of Stephen Sondheim's Passion. Alone Together was his one-man show first performed at the Donmar Warehouse (which was reprised in 2004 for the Singular Sensations season at the Haymarket). In 1998 Ball performed at three big concerts: The Fiftieth Birthday Concert of Andrew Lloyd Webber at the Royal Albert Hall (released on DVD), Sondheim Tonight at the Barbican Centre (released on CD) and Hey, Mr. Producer: The Musical World of Cameron Mackintosh (released on CD and DVD). In 2002 he took on the role of Caractacus Potts in the Sherman Brothers musical Chitty Chitty Bang Bang, which was largely considered his comeback role.

In 2004, he co-starred with Petula Clark in a production of Lloyd Webber's Sunset Boulevard at the Cork Opera House, later broadcast by the BBC. Later the same year he was a guest star at Clark's Concert, also broadcast by the BBC. He sang three tracks from his latest album, Since You've Been Gone; "Home" and "One Voice", as well as two duets with Clark. Other performances include singing at the BBC's St David's Day concert, in the role of Marius at the Les Misérables: The Dream Cast in Concert, the tenth anniversary concert of Les Misérables in 1995. A lyric baritone, Ball also sang the role of Valjean at a special concert performance of Les Misérables for the Queen and her guests at Windsor Castle in 2004. In 2005, with 10 days' notice, he replaced Michael Crawford as Count Fosco in The Woman in White after poor health forced Crawford to give up the role.

In November 2005, Ball returned to Broadway as Count Fosco in The Woman in White, which transferred from London's West End. He was, however, forced to leave the show because of a viral infection supposedly caused by the fat suit required for the role; this reportedly raised Ball's body temperature by several degrees during the show.

In September 2005, Ball made his New York City Opera debut as Reginald Bunthorne in Gilbert and Sullivan's Patience. He spent the first quarter of 2006 on complete vocal rest, following the illness that caused him to leave The Woman in White on Broadway. By the middle of July, Ball had taken part in the Royal Court Theatre's celebratory performance of The Rocky Horror Show. He took a leading role in Kismet in June and July 2007 for the ENO, and appeared on Channel 4's Richard & Judy on 22 June 2007 to promote this production. He then appeared as the solo artist in a controversial 'Musical Theatre' Prom on 27 August 2007 for the BBC at London's Royal Albert Hall. Ball performed a wide range of musical theatre numbers, including several by Andrew Lloyd Webber. The show was broadcast live on BBC Four, as well as on BBC Radio 3.

From October 2007 – July 2009, Ball made his West End return starring as Edna Turnblad in the hit musical Hairspray at the Shaftesbury Theatre in London. In March 2008, he was awarded the Laurence Olivier Award for Best Actor in a Musical for his portrayal. He also won the Whatsonstage.com Theatregoers' Choice Award for Best Actor in a Musical for his portrayal of Edna Turnblad. He recently starred in a new production of Sweeney Todd: The Demon Barber of Fleet Street at the Adelphi Theatre in the West End, alongside Imelda Staunton as Mrs. Lovett. The show premiered at the Chichester Festival Theatre for six weeks starting 24 September 2011 before transferring to London in March 2012. Michael and Imelda were both awarded Olivier awards, best actor and best actress in a musical for their Sweeney Todd performances. Ball starred as Mack in Mack and Mabel, which toured the UK in 2015.

In 2018, he starred as Anatoly Sergievsky in the West End revival of Sir Tim Rice's Chess at the London Coliseum. His co-stars included Tim Howar, Cassidy Janson, and Alexandra Burke.

It was announced in February 2019 that Ball will star as Inspector Javert opposite Alfie Boe (Jean Valjean) in a staged concert production of Les Misérables. The production will open on 10 August 2019, at the Gielgud Theatre and serve as a placeholder while the original West End production of Les Mis at the Queen's Theater is replaced with Cameron Mackintosh's new staging of the show at the renamed Sondheim theatre. The staged concert was broadcast live to cinemas in the UK on 2 December 2019, and then encore showings in the UK and the USA. This staged concert has become the highest live stream concert at cinemas in UK history. The live stream also became available as a DVD and CD in early 2020. The concert was broadcast on BBC Radio 2 on 5 January 2020.

In 2021, Ball reprised his role as Edna Turnblad in a revival of Hairspray at the London Coliseum, which opened in June of that year. In 2023, he played George Dillingham in a revival of Aspects of Love at the Lyric Theatre. In 2024, he reprised the role of Javert in Les Misérables: The Arena Spectacular World Tour. In November and December 2026, he's set to take on the role of King Herod in the Theatre Royal Drury Lane's revival of Jesus Christ Superstar.

From June to September 2027, Ball will play Willy Wonka in a new production of Charlie and the Chocolate Factory at the London Coliseum.

== Recording work ==
Ball is a concert artist: he tours frequently around the United Kingdom and has also performed concerts in Australia and the United States. He has also had success in the charts with his recording work. Since reaching Number 2 in the UK singles chart with "Love Changes Everything" from Aspects of Love, Ball had lesser success with follow up singles, but in the main has concentrated on releasing albums, all of which achieved gold status within weeks, and in the case of The Movies album in 1998, platinum in seven weeks (released 26 October, confirmed platinum status on 12 December).

Ball represented the UK in the Eurovision Song Contest 1992 held in Malmö, Sweden, singing the song "One Step Out of Time", which finished second. The single reached number 20 in the UK, while an eponymous album released in the same year reached number 1. This began a run of top 20 albums released over the next two decades. In July 2006, Ball was a guest artist on Julian Lloyd Webber's album Unexpected Songs and in November of that year released a DVD containing all the best songs from his Live in Concert DVDs. This is split into five sections: Musicals, Love Songs, Personal Favourites, Party Time, and Unplugged. The DVD also included a brand new "Unplugged" session which Ball recorded especially with four other musicians in the studio. It was released on 20 November 2006. Ball took part in many promotional activities at the end of the 2006 to coincide with the release of his album One Voice. This involved singing the song "Home" on ITV's GMTV, This Morning, and the BBC One programme The Heaven and Earth Show, hosted by Gloria Hunniford.

A new compilation album entitled Michael Ball: The Silver Collection was released in July 2007, along with the DVD version of his 1995 film England My England. Towards the end of 2007, Ball recorded his 15th solo album for release on 15 October of that year. The album features songs all written by Burt Bacharach and is entitled Back to Bacharach. It was released along with a performance DVD of his 2007 tour, One Voice Live, filmed at London's Hammersmith Apollo. Promotional activities took place throughout October and November 2007 for these releases including appearances on Friday Night with Jonathan Ross and Loose Women.

In February 2013, Ball released his album "Both Sides Now" featuring the song "Fight the Fight" from Tim Rice's new musical From Here to Eternity.

In November 2014, Ball released his new album, If Everyone Was Listening. In March 2019, he released the album Coming Home To You. The album reached number one in the UK Albums Chart and, although Ball has had many hits, this is his first solo number one selling album in 26 years.

He has recorded three albums with Alfie Boe. Two reached number 1; Ball & Boe: Together in 2016 and Ball & Boe: Together Again in 2017. Their third album, Ball & Boe: Back Together in 2019 reached number 2 in the UK Albums Chart.

In April 2020, Ball recorded a duet with 99 year old World War II veteran Captain Tom Moore, in aid of the NHS during the COVID-19 pandemic. Their cover of "You'll Never Walk Alone" reached number one in the UK singles chart on 24 April, not only giving Ball his first chart-topping single at the age of 57, but also making Moore the oldest ever person in history to score a number one hit.

In February 2026, Ball released his new single "Vintage" ahead of his new album Glow.

== Television ==
As an actor, Ball briefly appeared as Malcolm Nuttall in Coronation Street in 1985. Ball has also turned his hand to presenting both on TV and radio. Ball had his own TV series, Michael Ball, in 1993 and 1994 a Christmas Special in 1995 and a three-part series in 1998 filmed by BBC Cymru Wales Ball in the Hall. These three episodes were combined to make a special which was then broadcast on BBC One. Ball has presented The National Lottery Draws and Children in Need. He guest presented This Morning for a short period.

Ball co-judged the second series of ITV reality television show Soapstar Superstar in 2007. In 2010 Ball took part in the BBC Cymru Wales programme Coming Home about his Welsh family history. In 2010, Ball presented 30 episodes of The Michael Ball Show, his own daytime series for ITV. In 2010 and 2011, Ball guest presented six episodes of Lorraine for ITV Breakfast.

On 10 April 2013, Ball guest hosted The One Show for the first time as a stand-in presenter. He has presented the show on several occasions since. On 18 November 2013, Ball guest presented an episode of teatime chat show The Paul O'Grady Show after Paul O'Grady was taken ill. On 24 November 2013, he guest starred as a fictionalized version of himself in the British sitcom Toast of London. On 29 December 2013, Ball was a contestant on a celebrity Christmas edition of Catchphrase.

On 3 January 2014, BBC Four broadcast a special tribute programme to the lyricist Don Black called Diamonds are Forever: A tribute to Don Black which took place at the Royal Festival Hall in London. Ball sang two songs on this show; the first was the song Born Free, which won the Academy Award for Best Original Song and was a hit for the British male singer Matt Monro in 1966. Black wrote the lyrics for this song and the music was composed by John Barry for the film of the same name, Born Free. The second song Ball sang during the programme was Love Changes Everything, a song that Black co-wrote with lyricist Charles Hart for the musical Aspects of Love, composed by Andrew Lloyd Webber. This song was released as a single by Ball in 1989 and stayed in the British pop charts for fourteen weeks. The BBC Concert Orchestra provided the orchestral backing for Ball on both songs for this performance.

On 26 December 2014, Ball starred in Victoria Wood's musical That Day We Sang, reuniting him with his Sweeney Todd co-star Imelda Staunton.

Michael has fronted three ITV shows with Alfie Boe. They were broadcast in 2016, 2017 and 2019.

- 2016 – Ball and Boe: One Night Only
- 2017 – Ball and Boe: Back Together
- 2019 – Ball and Boe: A Very Merry Christmas

== Radio ==
Ball hosted Ball over Broadway and The Greenroom on BBC Radio 2 and several specials on subjects such as Nat King Cole, Cameron Mackintosh, and Cy Coleman.

His first regular show on BBC Radio 2 was Michael Ball's Sunday Brunch in 2008, replacing Michael Parkinson whose show Parkinson's Sunday Supplement had ended the previous year. The show aired on Sunday mornings between 11 am and 1 pm until September 2011, latterly sharing its time slot with Weekend Wogan presented by Terry Wogan.

After a short break, in 2013 Ball returned to Radio 2 with a new show, Sunday Night With Michael Ball, airing on Sunday evenings between 7 pm and 9 pm. Following the death of Sir Terry Wogan, Ball returned to the Sunday morning slot on 10 April 2016, with the show now titled The Michael Ball Show. Claudia Winkleman took over the vacant Sunday evening slot later that month.

He was also a regular stand-in presenter for Ken Bruce until 2016 on the station.

On 2 April 2024, it was announced that Ball would be moving from his 11 am–1 pm Sunday lunchtime slot in June to take over Sunday Love Songs between 9 am and 11 am, following the death of long time host Steve Wright in February. He started his new show, Love Songs with Michael Ball, on 2 June 2024 and was replaced by Paddy McGuinness on the later show.

== Recent career ==
Ball embarked on an extensive British tour during March and April 2007. There were 23 dates on the tour covering England, Scotland, Northern Ireland and Wales. The tour started with two nights in Belfast, before a number of shows in the north of England and the Midlands. Ball then headed to Glasgow and Aberdeen before returning for shows in London, Birmingham and Northampton. Ball took a trip to his old home in Plymouth before embarking on the final leg of his tour. It saw Ball perform in Ipswich and Northampton before ending his tour in Cardiff. He made his debut with the English National Opera in the lead role of Hajj/Poet in a new production of Robert Wright and George Forrest's Kismet after this tour.

In August 2007, he made his BBC Proms debut with An Evening with Michael Ball at the Royal Albert Hall, which marked the first time a musical theatre star had been given a solo concert at the classical music festival. Ball appeared in the Royal Variety Performance at the Empire Theatre in Liverpool on 3 December 2007 singing "You Can't Stop the Beat" with the rest of the cast from Hairspray, the musical he was appearing in at the time. He continued in the role of Edna Turnblad in the musical at the Shaftesbury Theatre until 29 April 2009. On 2 March 2008, Ball appeared as the guest on the BBC Radio 4 show Desert Island Discs, during which he talked about his early life and his career, including his struggle with stage fright in his early career, and a little about his personal life. He performed a number of summer concerts, including the Hampton Court Music Festival on 14 June 2008. From 6 April 2008, Ball took over Michael Parkinson's Sunday Supplement on BBC Radio 2 every Sunday from 11 am to 1 pm Ball won the 2008 Whatsonstage.com Theatregoers' Choice Award for Best Actor in a Musical. He also won the 2008 Laurence Olivier Award for Best Actor in a Musical, his first Olivier Award.

Ball's solo album Past and Present was released on 9 March 2009 by Universal Music. The album includes a compilation of previously released material celebrating Ball's 25th anniversary in the music industry, as well as six new tracks, including "You Can't Stop the Beat", from Hairspray. Ball appeared on a number of television and radio programmes to promote the album. He toured the United Kingdom with an orchestra and five West End stars, (Louise Clare Marshall, Louise Dearman, Emma Williams, Adrian Hansel and Ben James-Ellis), in the autumn, celebrating 25 years in the music industry. His concert at the Royal Albert Hall on 19 September 2009 was filmed for DVD release. Ball performed in a "one-off" Christmas Concert on 12 December 2009 in aid of The Shooting Star Children's Hospice, which he supports. All profits made went to this charity. The Shooting Star Children's Hospice and CHASE Hospice Care for Children joined to become Shooting Star CHASE in 2011 and Ball is a patron for this charity.

On 14 February 2010, Ball stepped in as a guest judge for Robin Cousins on ITV1's Dancing on Ice while Cousins was in Vancouver for the Winter Olympics. On 10 February 2010, Ball recorded a television pilot for ITV1, which was commissioned as a full series in the summer, titled The Michael Ball Show.

The 25th Anniversary Concert of Les Misérables was held at The O2 Arena. It featured Alfie Boe as Jean Valjean, Norm Lewis as Javert, Lea Salonga as Fantine, Ramin Karimloo as Enjolras, Hadley Fraser as Grantaire, Katie Hall as Cosette, Matt Lucas as Thénardier, Jenny Galloway as Madame Thénardier, Samantha Barks as Éponine, Nick Jonas as Marius Pontmercy, the role Ball delivered in the original London production. Casts of the current London, international tour and original 1985 London productions took part, comprising an ensemble of 300 performers and musicians. Ball and Colm Wilkinson anchored the encore, with four Jean Valjeans singing "Bring Him Home": Wilkinson from the original London cast, John Owen-Jones from the 25th Anniversary touring production, Simon Bowman from the current London cast and Alfie Boe, who sang the role in the concert. The original 1985 cast then led the ensemble in a performance of "One Day More". After speeches from Cameron Mackintosh, Alain Boublil and Claude-Michel Schönberg, the performance concluded with pupils from school productions of Les Misérables entering the arena. The evening concert telecast live to cinemas across the UK, Ireland and globally. A Blu-ray and DVD version of the 2010 broadcast was released in November 2010 in the UK and in North America in February 2011.

Ball co-hosted the Olivier Awards with Imelda Staunton on 13 March 2011 at the Theatre Royal, Drury Lane, London. His album Heroes was released on 14 March 2011. It entered the UK charts at number 10.

In 2013, Ball was awarded an Honorary Doctorate of the Arts from University of Plymouth.

In 2017, Ball backs children's fairy tales app GivingTales in aid of UNICEF together with Roger Moore, Stephen Fry, Ewan McGregor, Joan Collins, Joanna Lumley, Michael Caine, Charlotte Rampling and Paul McKenna.

On 29 March 2019, the album debuted at number one on the UK Albums Chart. Coming Home to You was Michael Ball's fourth UK number one album, his first solo number one album in the UK since his self-titled debut album in 1992. Talking to the Official Charts Company, he said, "It's the most exciting news! Thank you so much for supporting the album, to the fans who've connected with it and bought it. The hard work has been worth it and this is just the icing on the cake. Amazing!".

=== "You'll Never Walk Alone" ===
In April 2020, to mark 99-year old Captain Tom Moore completing the first phase of his fundraising walk during the COVID-19 pandemic, Ball sang "You'll Never Walk Alone" for him live on BBC Breakfast. Within 24 hours, the performance was recorded, and made into a digital single featuring the NHS Voices of Care Choir, and Moore's spoken words. Released by Decca Records, with all proceeds going to NHS Charities Together, the recording went straight to number one in the United Kingdom's "The Official Big Top 40" chart. It sold almost 36,000 copies in its first 48 hours, and was "biggest trending song" as measured by the Official Charts Company. On 24 April, it became No. 1 in the weekly "official" UK singles chart, making Moore the oldest person to achieve that position and meaning that he will be at No. 1 on his 100th birthday.

== Personal life ==
Ball lives with his partner, the former presenter of Ready Steady Go!, Cathy McGowan in Barnes, London. They met around 1989 when she was an entertainment reporter for a BBC London magazine show and interviewed him during rehearsals for Aspects of Love. They have lived together since 1992. On 23 December 2000, she saved his life by dragging him out of a house fire. McGowan was previously married to actor Hywel Bennett, the marriage producing a daughter, Emma. Ball is godfather to Emma's son.

Ball returned to the Guildford School of Acting in April 2022 to deliver a speech to the graduating postgraduates of that year. Whilst there, the University of Surrey awarded Ball with an honorary doctorate.

Ball's step-granddaughter Grace Crompton represents England at rugby sevens and was chosen for the 2022 Commonwealth Games.

== Discography ==
=== Solo albums ===
- Michael Ball (1992)
- Always (1993)
- One Careful Owner (1994)
- First Love (1995)
- The Musicals (1996)
- The Movies (1998)
- The Very Best of Michael Ball – In Concert at the Royal Albert Hall (1999)
- Christmas (1999 & 2000)
- This Time... It's Personal (2000)
- Centre Stage (2001)
- A Love Story (2003)
- Love Changes Everything – The Essential Michael Ball (2004)
- Music (2005)
- One Voice (2006)
- Back to Bacharach (2007)
- Past and Present: The Very Best of Michael Ball (2009)
- Heroes (2011)
- Both Sides Now (2013)
- If Everyone Was Listening (2014)
- Together with Alfie Boe (2016)
- Together Again with Alfie Boe (2017)
- Coming Home to You (2019)
- Back Together with Alfie Boe (2019)
- Together at Christmas with Alfie Boe (2020)
- We Are More Than One (2021)
- Together in Vegas with Alfie Boe (2022)
- Together at Home with Alfie Boe (2024)
- Glow (2026)

=== Cast recordings ===
- Les Misérables – Original London Cast (1985) as Marius Pontmercy
- Les Misérables – Complete Symphonic Recording (1988) as Marius Pontmercy
- Rage of the Heart – Concept Album (1989) as Peter Abelard
- Aspects of Love – Original London Cast (1989) as Alex Dillingham
- West Side Story – Studio Cast (1993) as Tony
- Les Misérables – 10th Anniversary – The Dream Cast in Concert (1995) as Marius Pontmercy
- Passion – Original London Cast in Concert (1997) as Georgio
- Sondheim Tonight (1998) – Concert Cast
- Hey, Mr. Producer: The Musical World of Cameron Mackintosh (1998) – Concert Cast, Raoul in The Phantom of the Opera, Marius in Les Misérables
- Chitty Chitty Bang Bang – Original London Cast (2002) as Caractacus Potts
- Sweeney Todd: The Demon Barber of Fleet Street – London Revival Cast (2012) as Sweeney Todd
- Les Misérables – The Staged Concert (2019) as Javert

== Filmography ==
Television

Year	Show	Role	Notes
1985	Coronation Street	Malcolm Nuttall	
1993–1995	Michael Ball	Presenter	
1998	Ball in the Hall	Presenter	
2004–2005, 2007, 2018	This Morning	Guest presenter	
2006–2007, 2009	The National Lottery Draws	Presenter	Wednesday night draws
2007	Soapstar Superstar	Judge	Series 2
2010	The Michael Ball Show	Presenter	30 episodes
2010–2011	Lorraine	Guest presenter	6 episodes
2013, 2016—	The One Show	Guest presenter	13 episodes
2013	Andrew Lloyd Webber: 40 Musical Years	Presenter	One-off special
2013	The Paul O'Grady Show	Stand-in presenter	1 episode
2014	That Day We Sang	Tubby (Jimmy)	
2016	Josh	Paul	
2016	Ball & Boe: One Night Only	Himself	With Alfie Boe
2017	Our Friend Victoria	Presenter & guest	
2017	Ball & Boe Back Together	Himself	With Alfie Boe
2021	Michael Ball's Wonderful Wales	Presenter	Four-part series

Guest appearances

- Would I Lie to You? (2009)
- Never Mind the Buzzcocks (2009, 2010, 2014)
- Coming Home (2010)
- Toast of London (2013)
- Sunday Brunch (2013, 2014, 2015)
- Catchphrase: Christmas Special (2013)
- Room 101 (2014)
- Diamonds are Forever: A Tribute to Don Black (2014)
- Mel & Sue (2015)
- Backchat (2015)
- Alan Davies: As Yet Untitled (2015)
- Michael McIntyre's Big Show (2016)
- Ant & Dec's Saturday Night Takeaway (2018)
- Inside No.9 (2024)

== Bibliography ==
Ball's debut novel The Empire set in the 1920s about a fictional theatre in the north of England was released on 13 October 2022.

On 12 October 2023, he released a memoir titled Different Aspects reflecting on his appearances in the original production and the 2023 revival of Aspects of Love.

Awards and achievements
Preceded by Samantha Janus with "A Message to Your Heart"	United Kingdom in the Eurovision Song Contest; 1992	Succeeded by Sonia with "Better the Devil You Know"
