= Arc de Triomphe =

Triumphal arch in Paris, France

- Arc de triomphe de l'Étoile
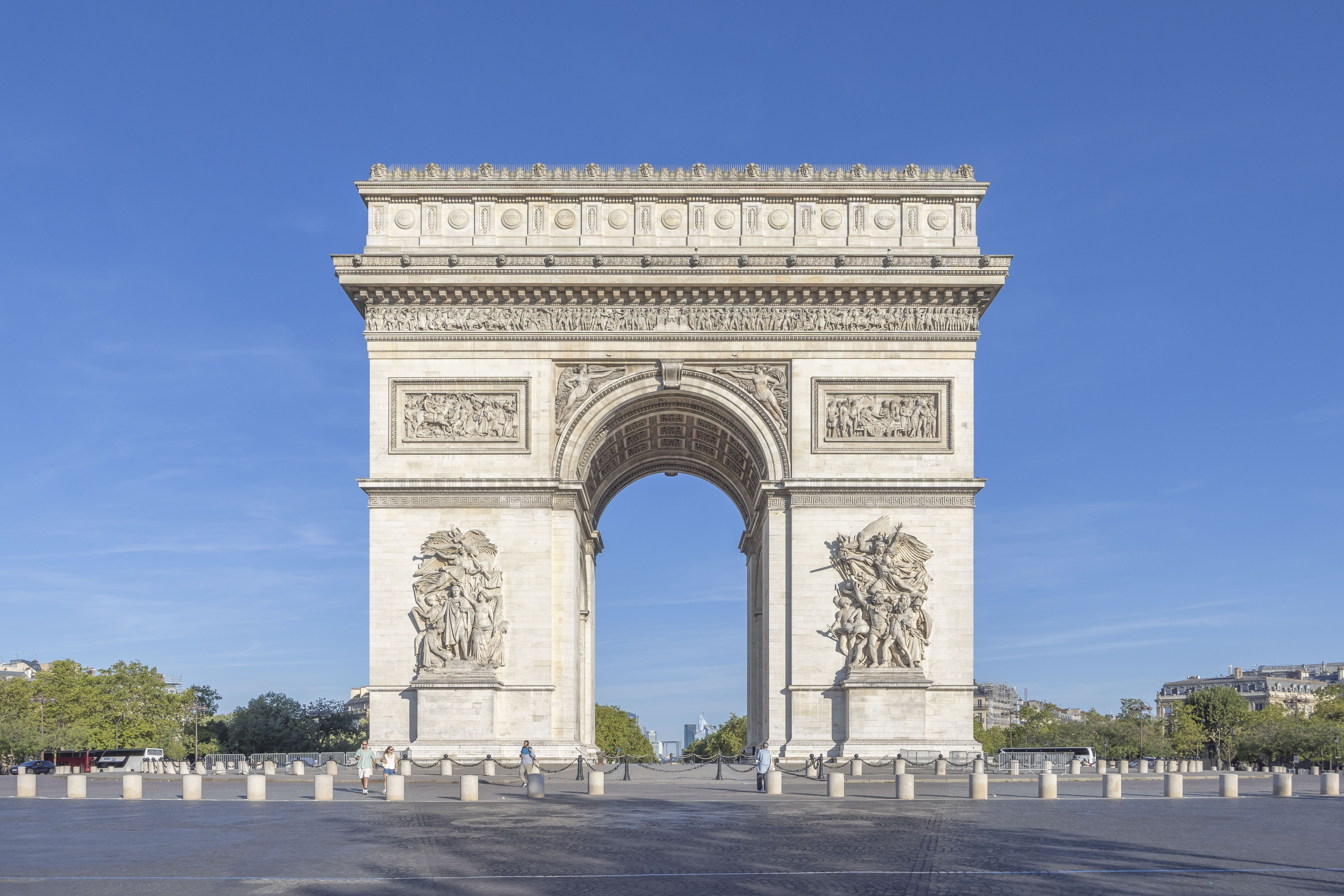
- Alternative names: Arc de Triomphe de l'Étoile

General information
- Type: Triumphal arch
- Architectural style: Neoclassicism
- Location: Place Charles de Gaulle, Paris, France
- Coordinates: 48°52′25.6″N 2°17′42.1″E
- Construction started: 15 August 1806
- Inaugurated: 28 July 1836

Height
- Height: 49.54 m (162.5 ft)

Dimensions
- Other dimensions: Wide: 44.82 m (147.0 ft); Deep: 22.21 m (72.9 ft)

Design and construction
- Architects: Jean-François Chalgrin (1806–1811); Louis-Robert Goust (1811–1814, 1823–1830); Jean-Nicolas Huyot (1823–1825, 1826–1832); Guillaume-Abel Blouet (1832–1836)

The Arc de Triomphe de l'Étoile (UK: /ˌɑːrk də ˈtriːɒmf, - ˈtriːoʊmf/, US: /- triːˈoʊmf/, French: [aʁk də tʁijɔ̃f də letwal]; "Triumphal Arch of the Star"), often simply called the Arc de Triomphe, is one of the most famous monuments in Paris, France. It is located at the western end of the Champs-Élysées, at the centre of the Place Charles de Gaulle—formerly known as the "Place de l'Étoile"—named for the star-shaped configuration formed by the convergence of twelve radiating avenues. The monument is situated at the intersection of three arrondissements: the 16th (to the south and west), the 17th (to the north), and the 8th (to the east). Commissioned to honor those who fought and died for France during the French Revolutionary and Napoleonic Wars, the Arc bears the names of French victories and its generals engraved on its inner and outer surfaces. Beneath its vault lies the Tomb of the Unknown Soldier from World War I, marked by an eternal flame commemorating unidentified fallen soldiers of the French Nation.

The central cohesive element of the Axe historique ("historical axis", a sequence of monuments and grand thoroughfares on a route running from the courtyard of the Louvre Palace to the Grande Arche de la Défense), the Arc de Triomphe was designed by Jean-François Chalgrin in 1806; its iconographic programme depicts heroically nude warriors and set the tone for public monuments with triumphant patriotic messages. Inspired by the Arch of Titus in Rome, Italy, the Arc de Triomphe has an overall height of 49.54 m (162.5 ft), width of 44.82 m (147.0 ft) and depth of 22.21 m (72.9 ft), while its large vault is 29.19 m (95.8 ft) high and 14.62 m (48.0 ft) wide. The smaller transverse vaults are 18.68 m (61.3 ft) high and 8.44 m (27.7 ft) wide.

Paris's Arc de Triomphe was the tallest triumphal arch until the completion of the Monument to the Revolution in Mexico City, Mexico in 1938, which is 67 m (220 ft) high. The Arch of Triumph in Pyongyang, North Korea, completed in 1982, is modeled on the Arc de Triomphe and is slightly taller at 60 m (197 ft). The Grande Arche in La Défense near Paris, France is 110 m (361 ft) high, and, if considered to be a triumphal arch, is the world's tallest.

== History ==
=== Construction and late 19th century ===
The Arc de Triomphe is located on the right bank of the Seine river at the centre of a dodecagonal configuration of Place Charles de Gaulle.

Avenues radiate from the Arc de Triomphe at the Place Charles de Gaulle. Paving stones trace a stellar pattern on its surface, pointing toward the centre of each avenue.

It was commissioned in 1806, after the victory at Austerlitz by Emperor Napoleon I at the peak of his successes. Laying the foundations alone took two years and in 1810, when Napoleon entered Paris from the west with his new bride, Archduchess Marie-Louise of Austria, he had a wooden mock-up of the completed arch constructed. The architect, Jean-François Chalgrin, died in 1811 and the work was taken over by Louis-Robert Goust.

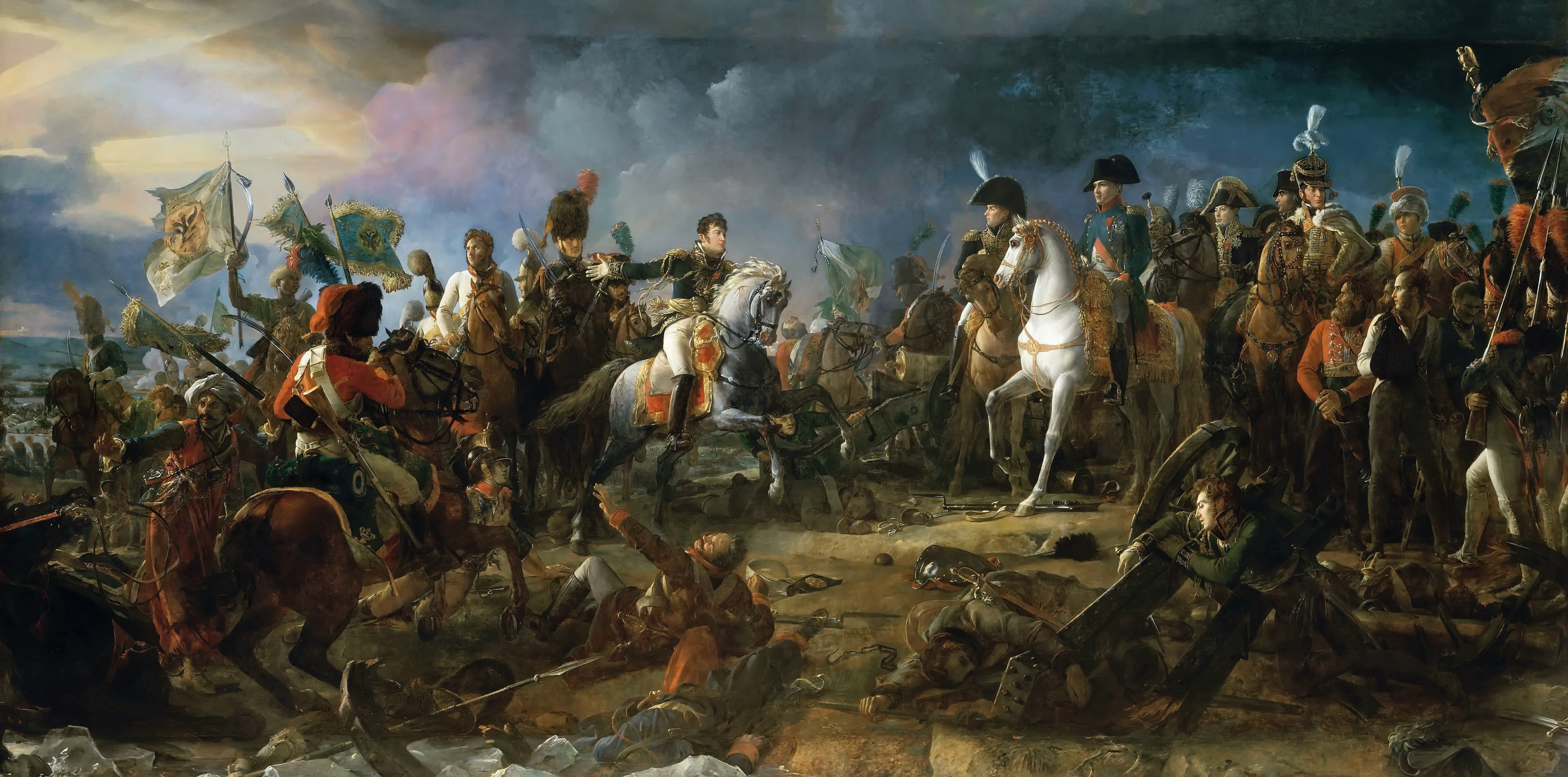
The Battle of Austerlitz, 2 December 1805, painting by François Gérard displayed in the Gallery of the Battles, at the Palace of Versailles

During the Bourbon Restoration, construction was halted until 1823, and it would not be completed until the reign of Louis Philippe I in 1836, by architects Louis-Robert Goust and Jean-Nicolas Huyot, under the direction of Louis-Étienne Héricart de Thury, then by Guillaume-Abel Blouet. The final cost was reported at about 10 million francs (equivalent to an estimated €65 million or $75 million in 2020).

Various designs were proposed to crown the monument with a monumental sculptural group, yet none was permanently realized. In 1838, Bernard Seurre submitted La France victorieuse ("Victorious France"), depicting a chariot drawn by six horses. In 1840, this proposal gave way to a temporary sculptural group representing Napoleon I, installed above the arch by the architect Guillaume-Abel Blouet for the return of the Emperor's remains. In preparing this installation, Blouet returned to a scheme he had drafted in 1834, modifying it by substituting the originally intended allegorical figure of France with that of the Emperor.

From 1882 to 1886, a quadriga by Alexandre Falguière was erected above the arch. The work, entitled Triomphe de la Révolution ("The Triumph of the Revolution"), depicted a chariot drawn by horses advancing "to crush Anarchy and Despotism". Executed in plaster, the group was hoisted to the summit of the monument in order to assess its visual effect. The result was judged unconvincing; although the sculpture remained in place for four years, its material deteriorated under exposure to the elements and it was ultimately removed. Following this episode, the proposal to crown the monument was ultimately abandoned.

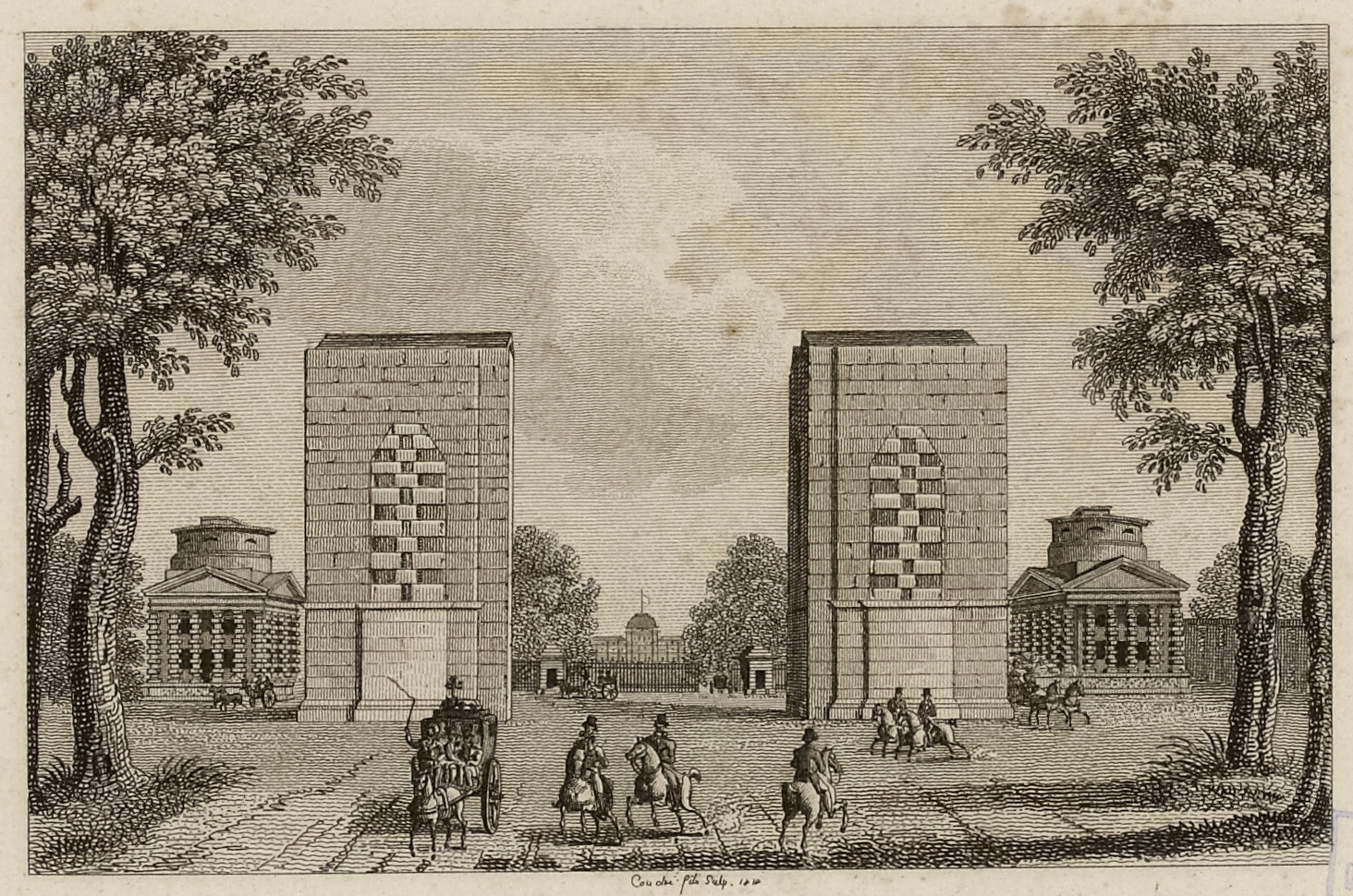
The unfinished Arc de Triomphe between the toll houses of the Barrière de l'Étoile, 1818

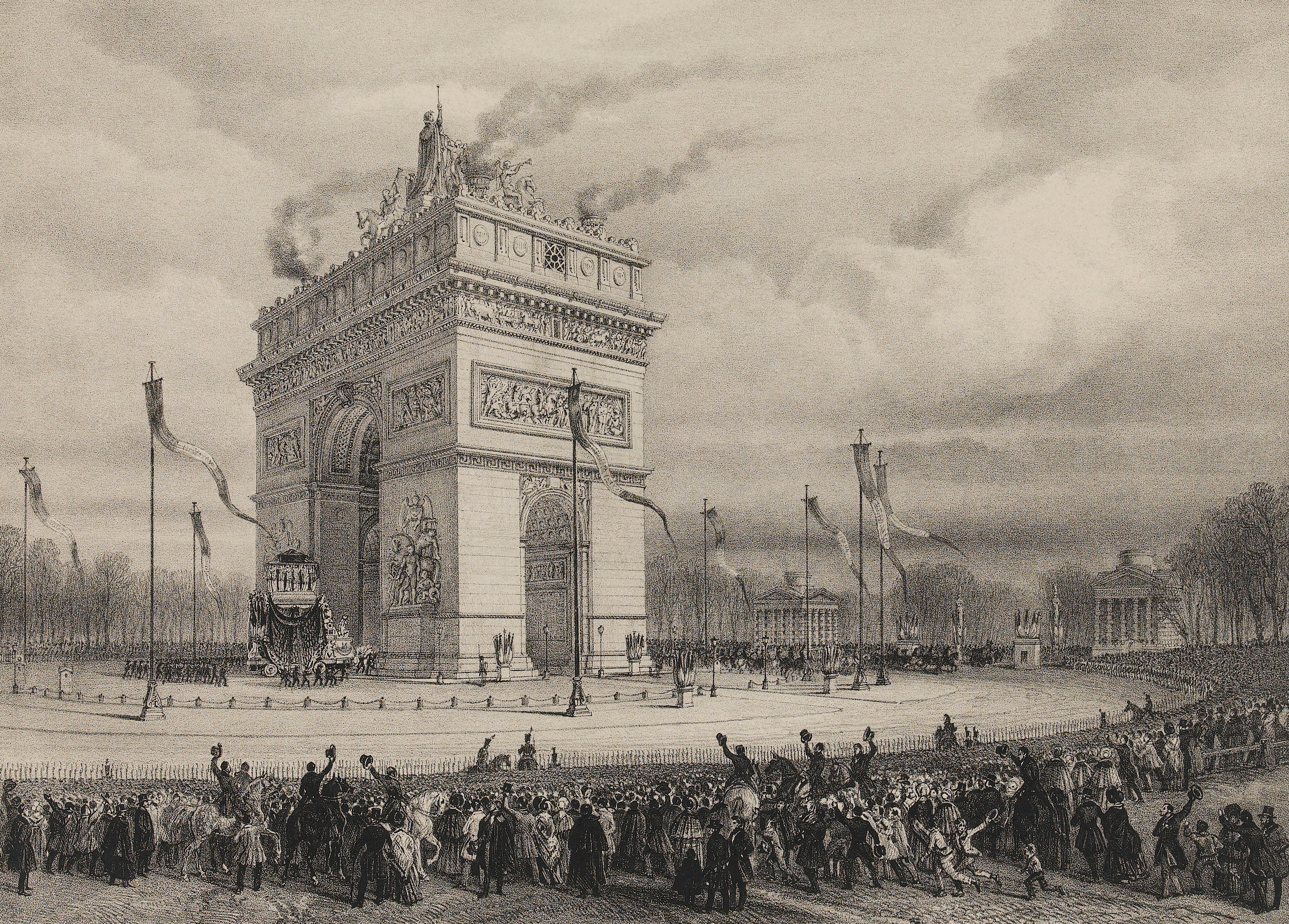
Sculptural group representing Napoleon I, installed on the Arc de Triomphe in 1840 for the return of his remains to France

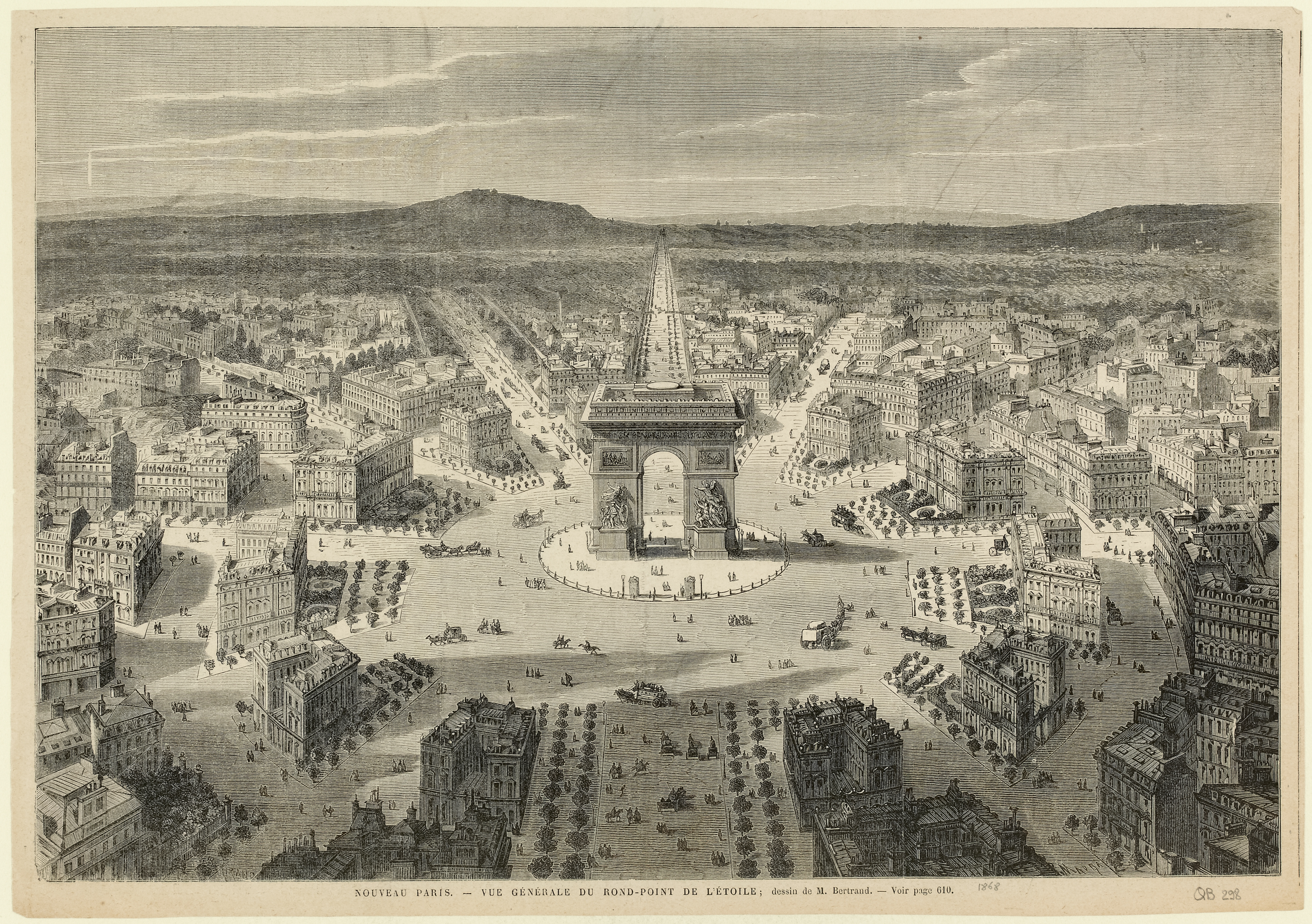
The Place de l'Étoile and Arc de Triomphe, 1868

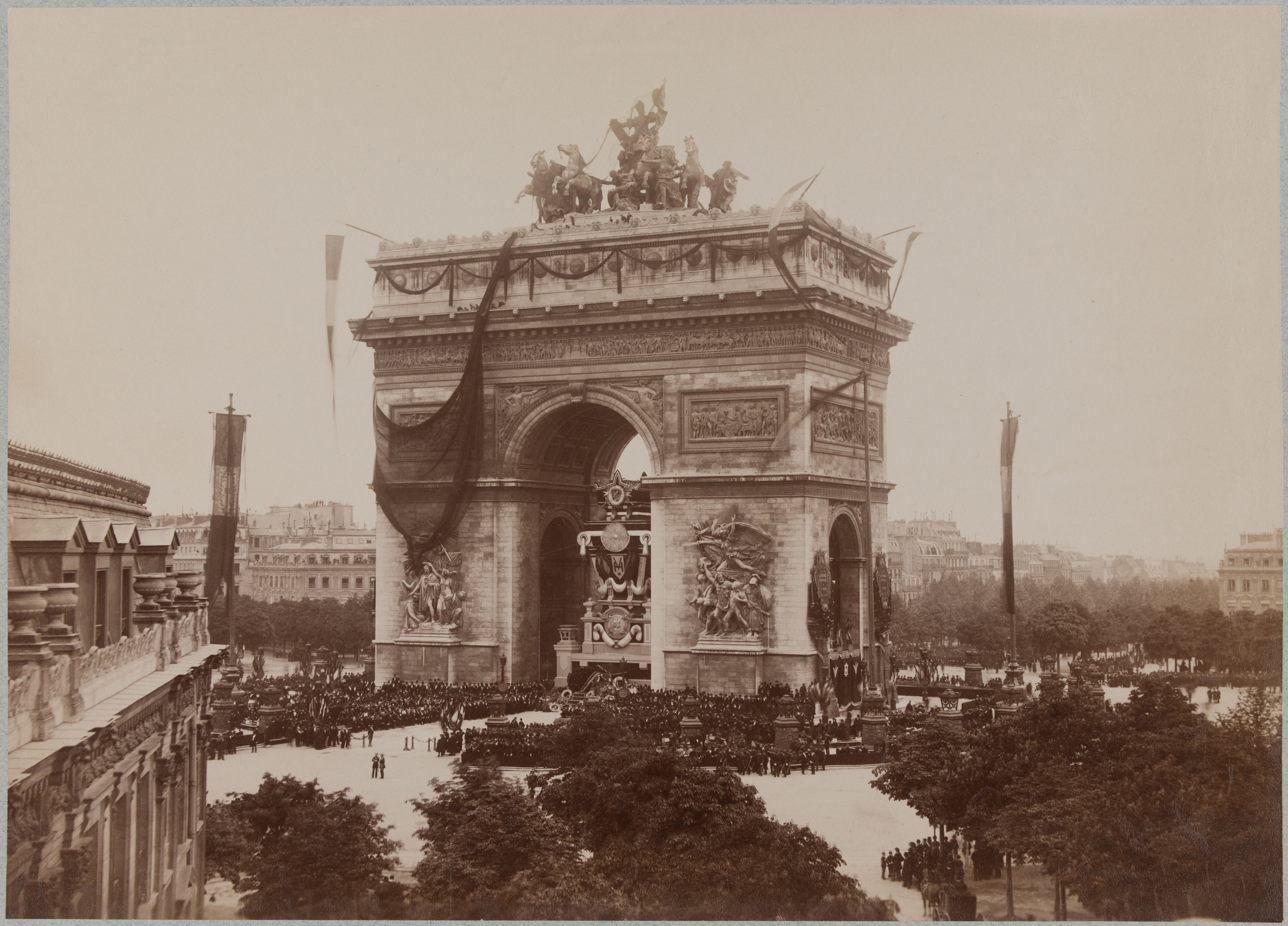
Quadriga installed on the Arc de Triomphe between 1882 and 1886, visible during the funeral of Victor Hugo on 31 May 1885

=== 20th century ===
Apparently, on the day the Battle of Verdun began in 1916, the sword carried by the figure of the Republic in La Marseillaise sculptural group broke off. The relief was immediately hidden by tarpaulins to conceal the accident and avoid any undesired ominous interpretations. On 7 August 1919, three weeks after the Paris victory parade marking the end of hostilities in World War I, Charles Godefroy flew his Nieuport biplane under the arch's primary vault, with the event captured on newsreel. Jean Navarre was the pilot who was tasked to make the flight, but he died on 10 July 1919 when he crashed near Villacoublay while training for the flight.

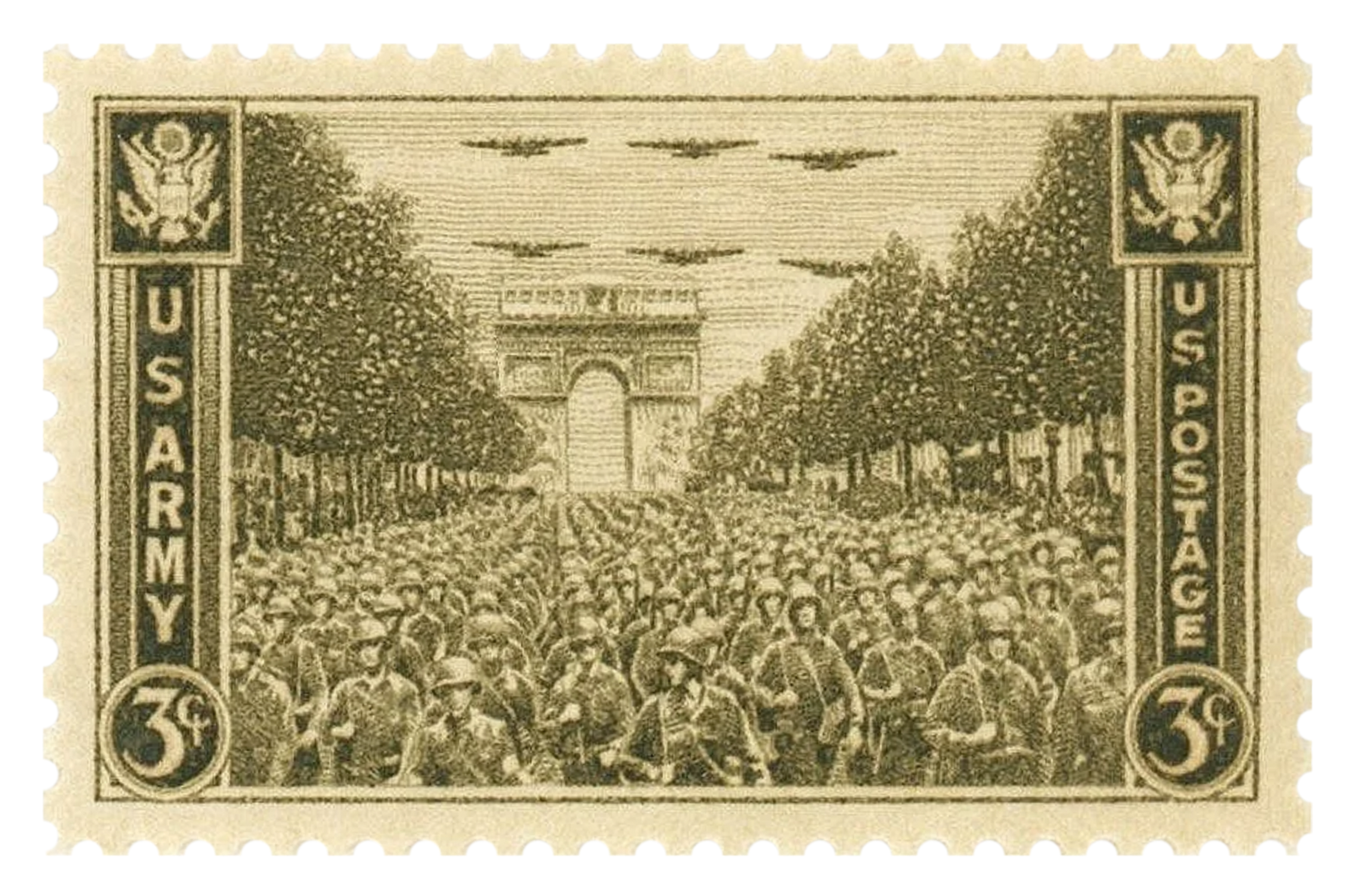
United States postage stamp showing the Arc de Triomphe in the background as victorious troops march down the Champs-Élysées on 29 August 1944

Following its construction, the Arc de Triomphe became the rallying point of French troops parading after successful military campaigns and for the annual Bastille Day military parade. Famous victory marches around or under the Arc have included the Germans in 1871, the French and Allies in 1919, the Germans in 1940, and the French and Allies in 1944 and 1945. After the interment of the Unknown Soldier, however, all military parades (including the aforementioned post-1919) have avoided marching through the actual arch. The route taken is up to the arch and then around its side, out of respect for the tomb and its symbolism. Both Adolf Hitler in 1940 and Charles de Gaulle in 1944 observed this custom.

By the early 1960s, the monument had grown very blackened from coal soot and automobile exhaust, and during 1965–1966 it was cleaned through bleaching. In the prolongation of the Avenue des Champs-Élysées, a new arch, the Grande Arche de la Défense, was built in 1982, completing the line of monuments that forms Paris's Axe historique. After the Arc de Triomphe du Carrousel and the Arc de Triomphe de l'Étoile, the Grande Arche is the third arch built on the same perspective.

In 1995, the Armed Islamic Group of Algeria placed a bomb near the Arc de Triomphe which wounded 17 people as part of a campaign of bombings.

On 12 July 1998, when France won the FIFA World Cup for the first time after defeating Brazil 3–0 at the Stade de France, images of the players including double goal scorer Zinedine Zidane and their names along with celebratory messages were projected onto the arch.

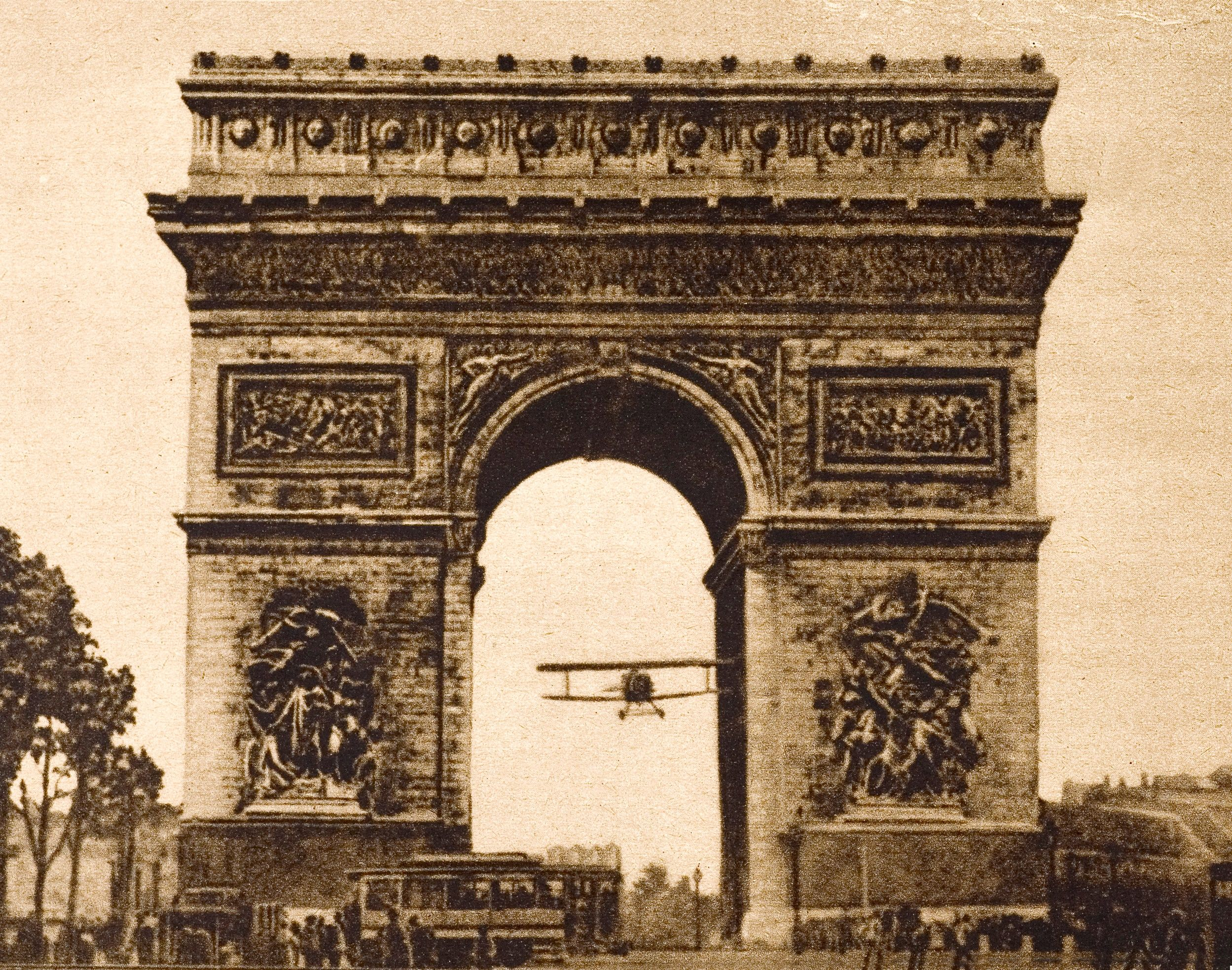
Charles Godefroy flying through the Arc de Triomphe in 1919

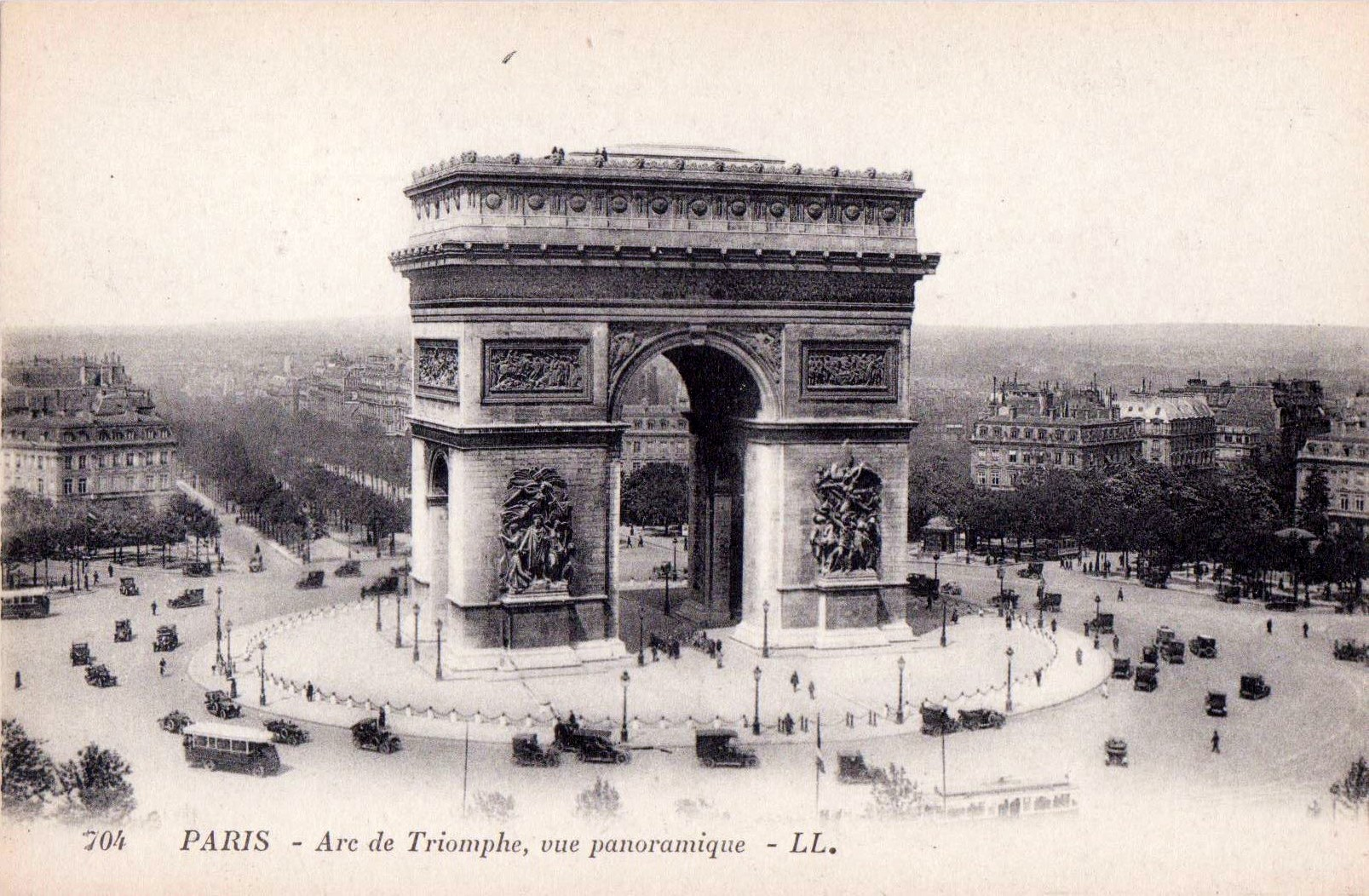
Arc de Triomphe, postcard, c. 1920

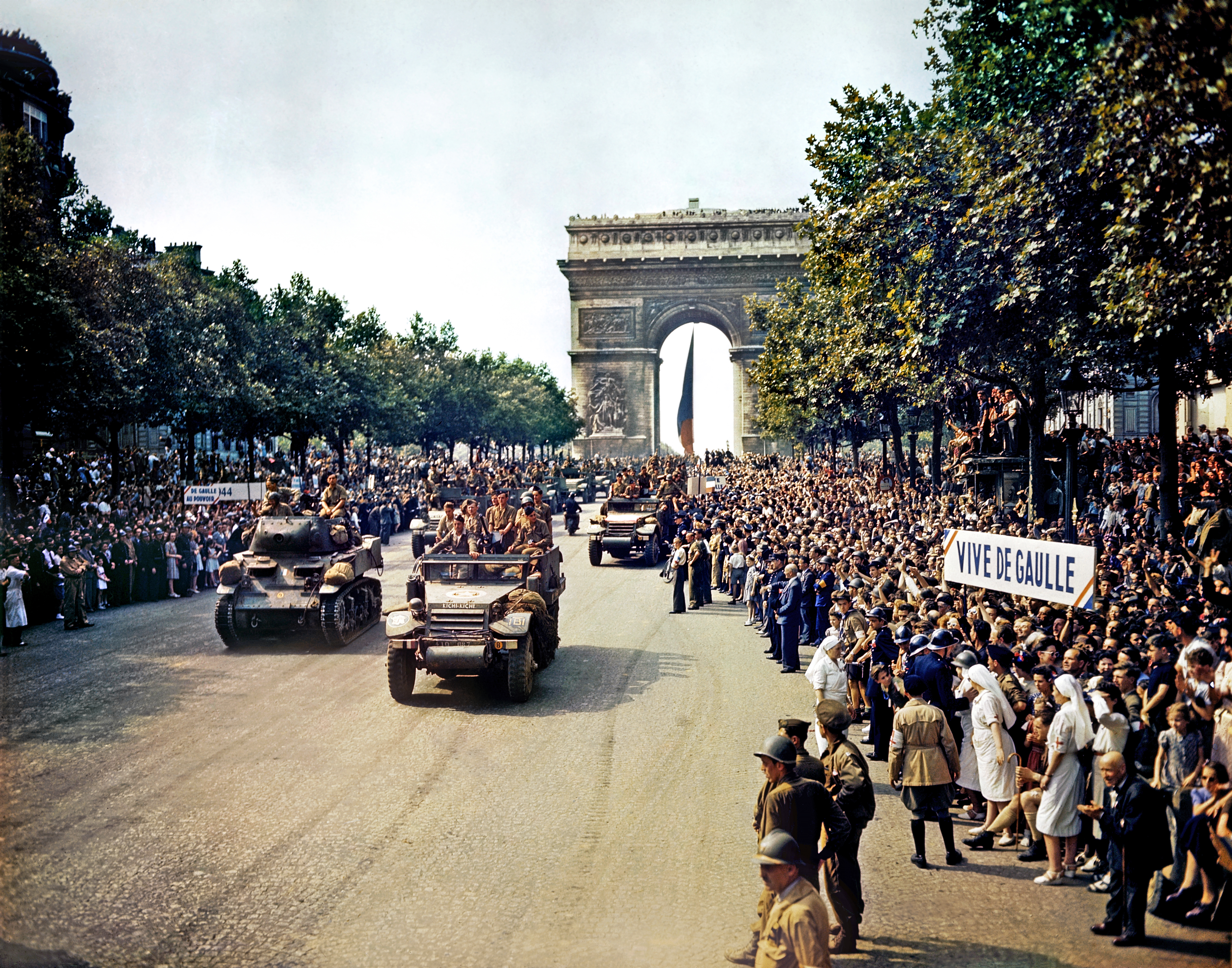
Free French forces on parade after the liberation of Paris on 26 August 1944

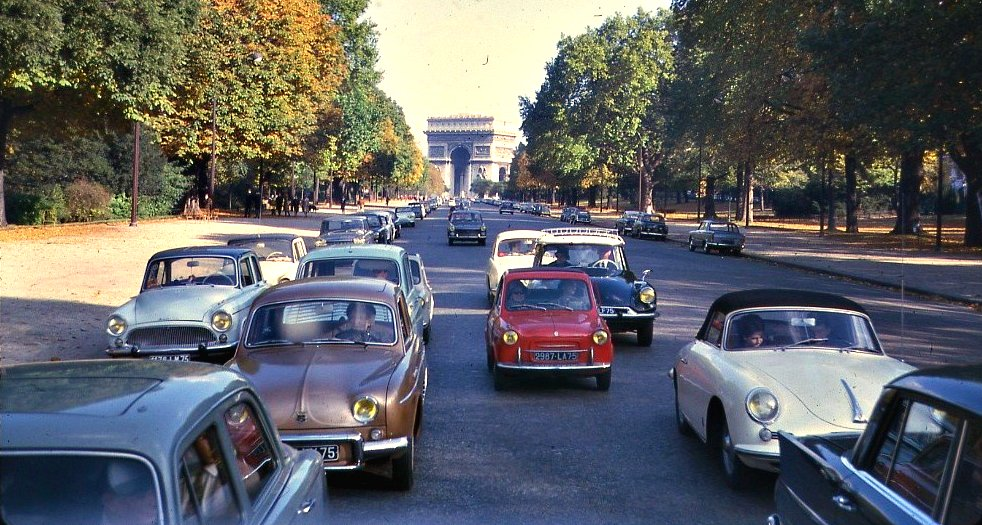
View of the Arc de Triomphe from the Avenue Foch, 1962

=== 21st century ===
In late 2018, the Arc de Triomphe suffered acts of vandalism during the yellow vests protests. A crowd of demonstrators sprayed the monument with graffiti and ransacked its museum. In September 2021, the Arc was wrapped in a silvery blue fabric and red rope, as part of L'Arc de Triomphe, Wrapped, a posthumous project planned by artists Christo and Jeanne-Claude since the early 1960s.

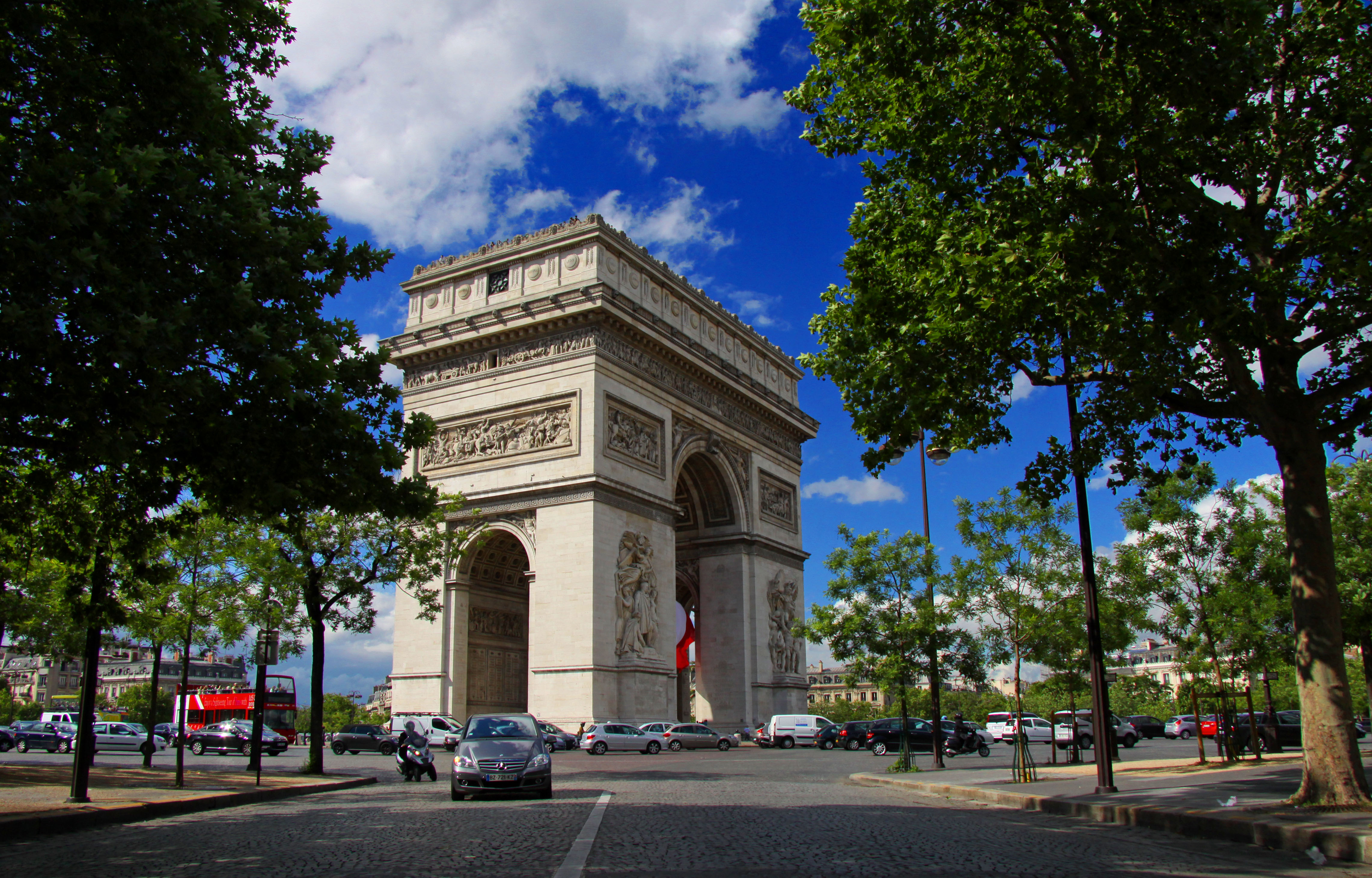
View of the Arc de Triomphe from the Avenue d'Iéna, 2012

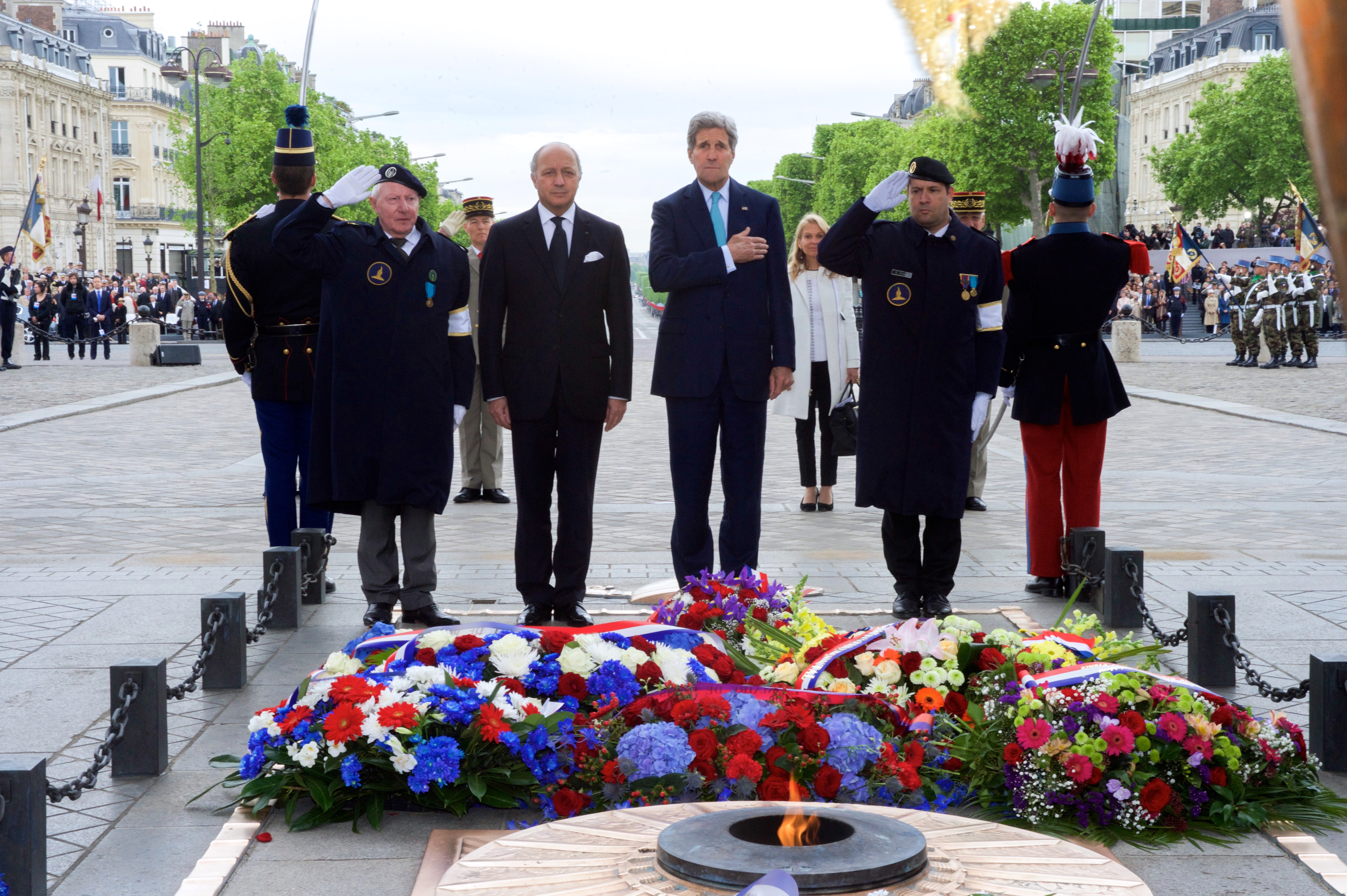
Laurent Fabius, Minister of Foreign Affairs, with John Kerry, U.S. Secretary of State, under the Arc de Triomphe in 2015

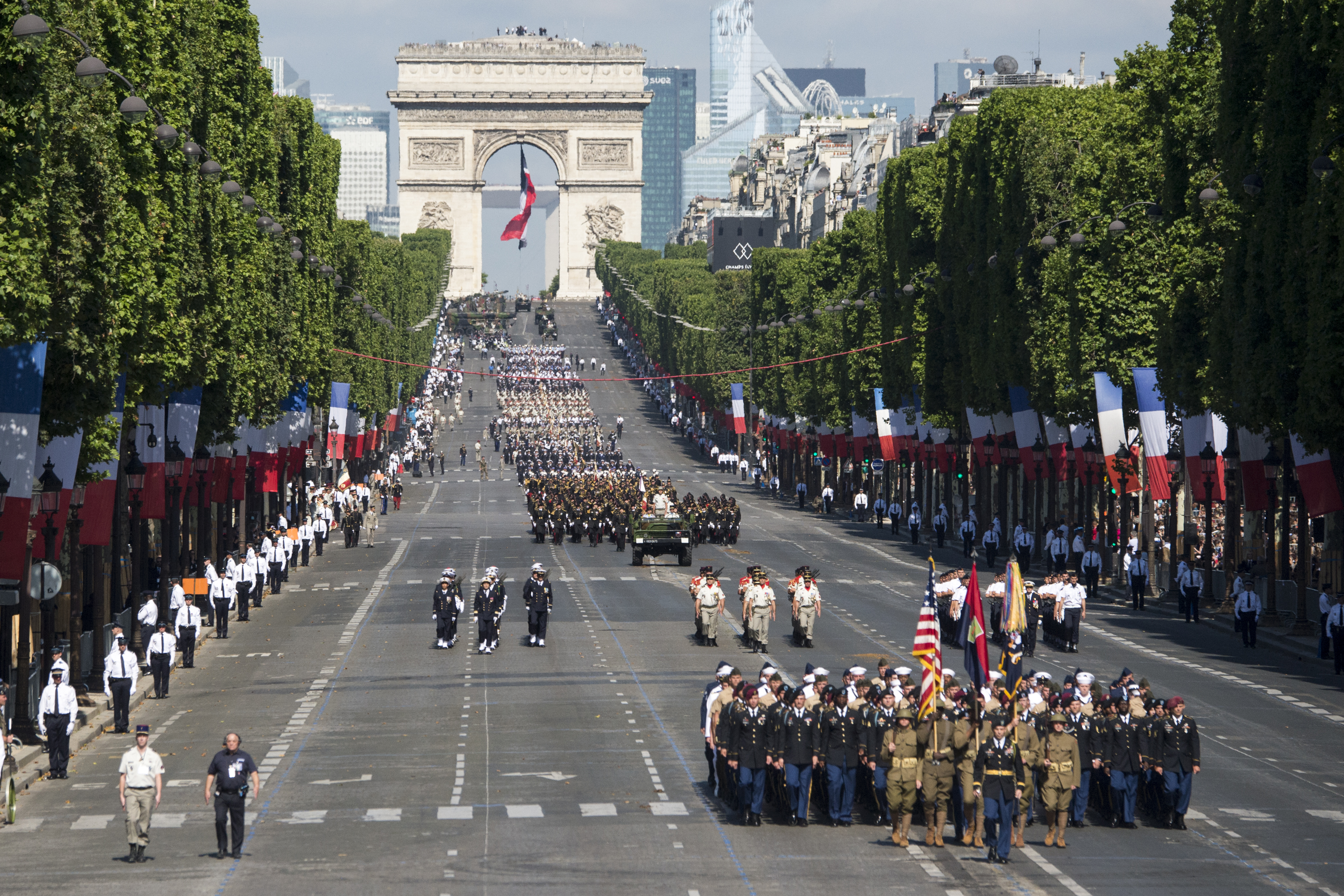
Bastille Day military parade, 2017

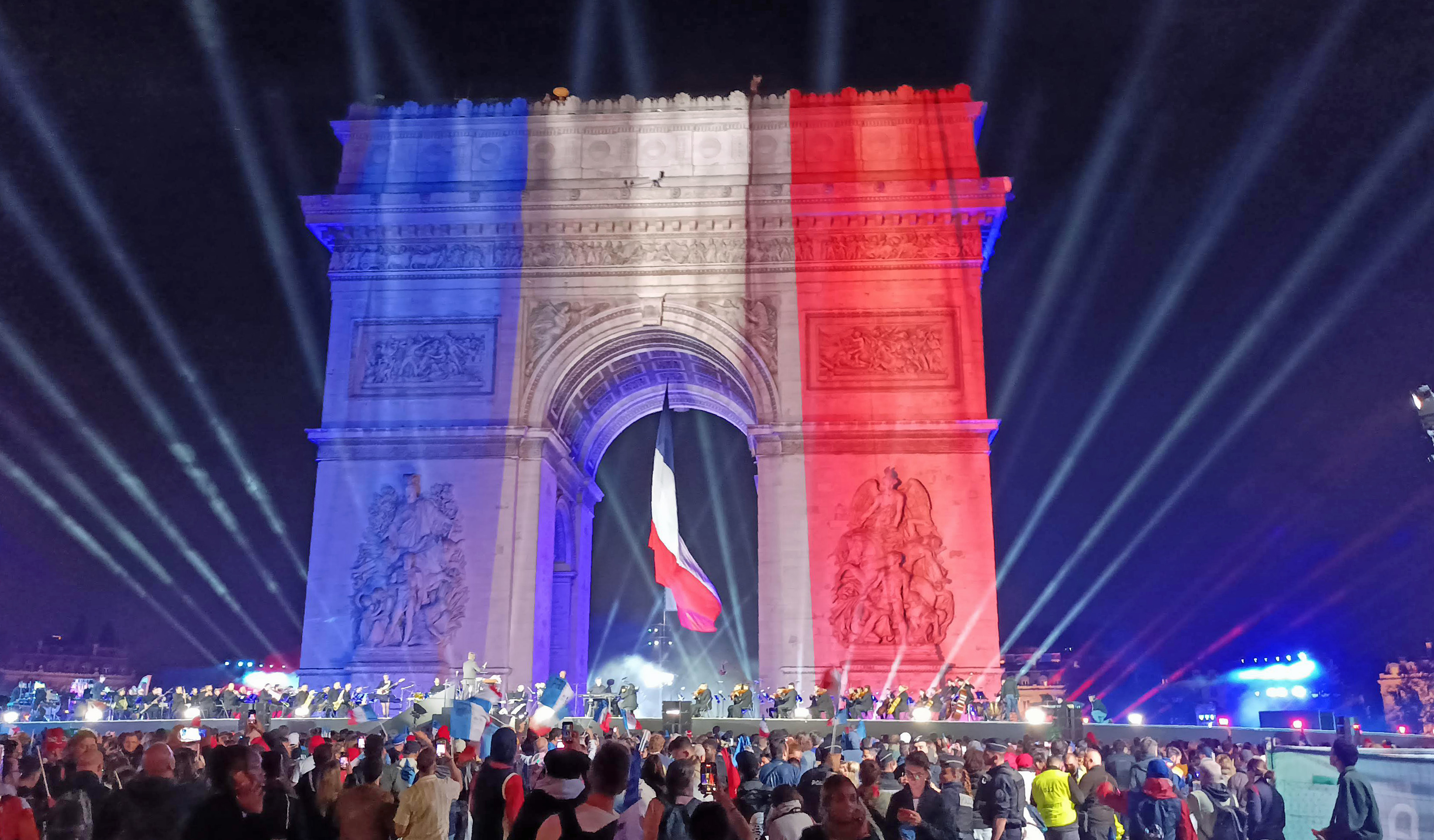
The Arc de Triomphe during the 2024 Summer Olympics in Paris

== Design ==
=== Monument ===
The astylar design is by Jean-François Chalgrin (1739–1811), in the Neoclassical version of ancient Roman architecture. Among the major French academic sculptors represented on the Arc de Triomphe are Jean-Pierre Cortot, François Rude, Antoine Étex, James Pradier, and Henri Lemaire.

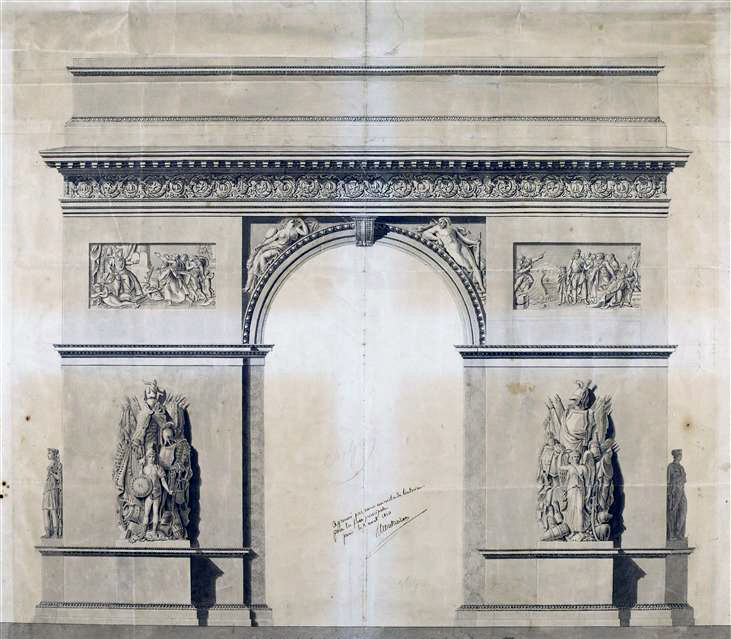
Jean-François Chalgrin's drawing of the Arc de Triomphe, c. 1806

The main sculptures are not integral friezes but are treated as independent trophies applied to the vast ashlar masonry masses, not unlike the gilt-bronze appliqués on Empire furniture. The four sculptural groups at the base of the Arc are The Triumph of 1810 (by Jean-Pierre Cortot), The Resistance of 1814 and The Peace of 1815 (both by Antoine Étex), and the most renowned of them all, The Departure of the Volunteers of 1792, commonly called La Marseillaise (by François Rude). The face of the allegorical representation of France calling forth her people on this last was used as the belt buckle for the honorary rank of Marshal of France. The sculptures representing Triumph, Resistance and Peace commemorate Napoleon's victories, the invasion of France in 1814, and the end of hostilities in 1815.

On the attic above the richly sculptured frieze of soldiers are 30 shields engraved with the names of major French victories in the French Revolution and Napoleonic wars. The inside walls of the monument list the names of 660 officers, among which are 558 French generals of the First French Empire; the names of those killed in battle are underlined. Also inscribed, on the shorter sides of the four supporting columns, are the names of the major French victories in the Napoleonic Wars. Battles that took place during the Hundred Days are not included.

Inside the monument, a permanent exhibition, conceived by artist Maurice Benayoun and architect Christophe Girault, opened in February 2007.

=== Tomb of the Unknown Soldier ===
Beneath the Arc is the Tomb of the Unknown Soldier from World War I. Interred on Armistice Day 1920, an eternal flame burns in memory of the dead who were never identified (now in both world wars).

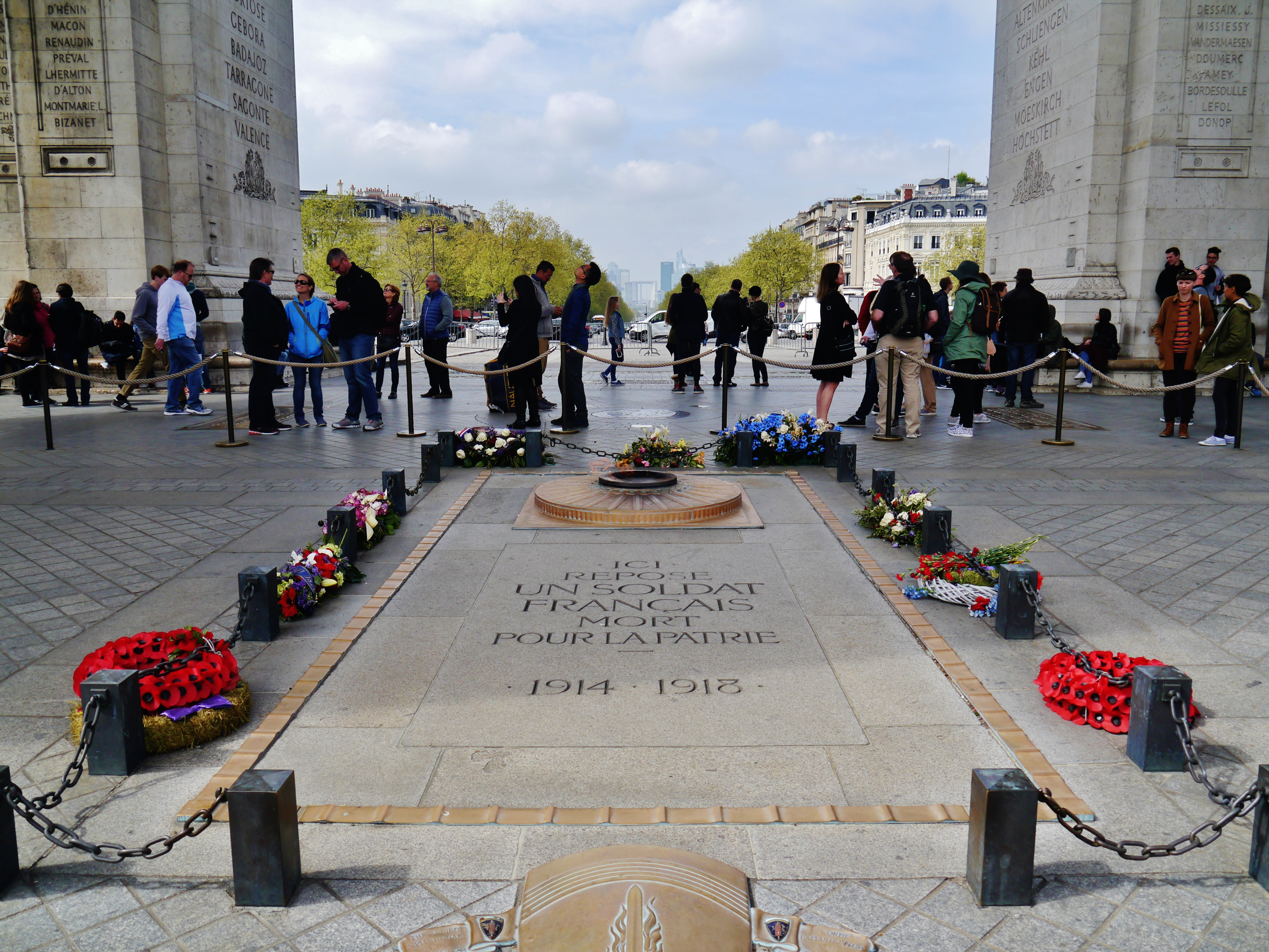
Tomb of the Unknown Soldier beneath the Arc de Triomphe

A ceremony is held at the Tomb of the Unknown Soldier every 11 November on the anniversary of the Armistice of 11 November 1918 signed by the Entente Powers and Germany in 1918. It was originally decided on 12 November 1919 to bury the unknown soldier's remains in the Panthéon, but a public letter-writing campaign led to the decision to bury him beneath the Arc de Triomphe. The coffin was put in the chapel on the first floor of the Arc on 10 November 1920, and put in its final resting place on 28 January 1921. The slab on top bears the inscription: Ici repose un soldat français mort pour la Patrie, 1914–1918 ("Here rests a French soldier who died for the Fatherland, 1914–1918").

In 1961, U.S. President John F. Kennedy and First Lady Jacqueline Kennedy paid their respects at the Tomb of the Unknown Soldier, accompanied by President Charles de Gaulle. After the 1963 assassination of President Kennedy, Mrs. Kennedy remembered the eternal flame at the Arc de Triomphe and requested that an eternal flame be placed next to her husband's grave at the Arlington National Cemetery in Virginia, United States.

== Details ==
The four main sculptural groups on each of the Arc's pillars are:

- The Departure of the Volunteers of 1792, also called La Marseillaise, by François Rude (southern façade, right). This sculptural group celebrates the cause of the French First Republic during the Battle of Valmy. Above the volunteers is the winged personification of Liberty. The group served as a recruitment tool in the early months of World War I and encouraged the French to invest in war loans in 1915–1916.
- The Triumph of 1810, by Jean-Pierre Cortot (southern façade, left). This group celebrates the Treaty of Schönbrunn and features Napoleon, crowned by the goddess of Victory.
- The Resistance of 1814, by Antoine Étex (northern façade, right). This group commemorates the French Resistance to the Allied Armies during the War of the Sixth Coalition.
- The Peace of 1815, by Antoine Étex (northern façade, left). This group commemorates the Treaty of Paris, concluded in that year.

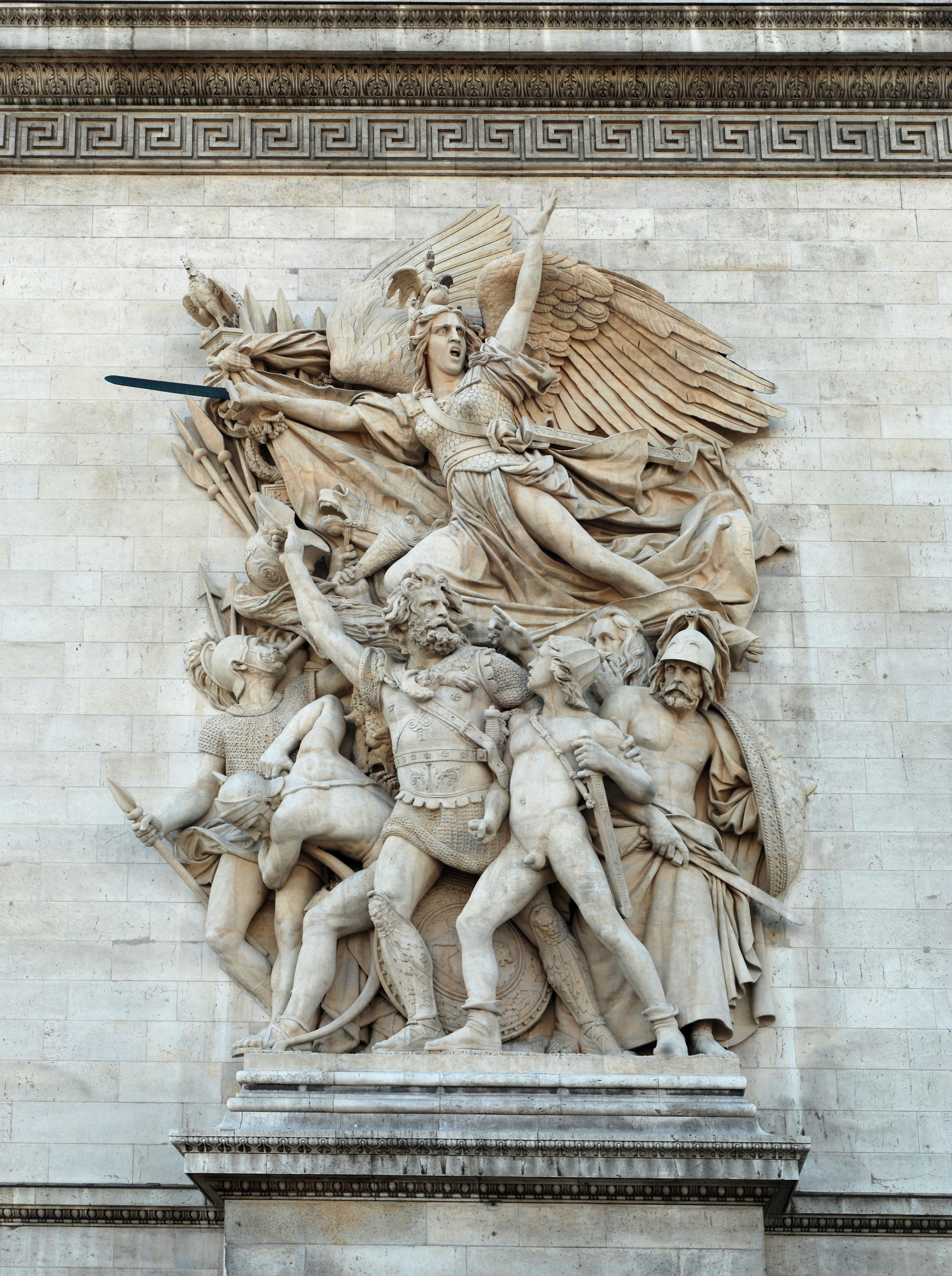
The Departure of the Volunteers of 1792 (La Marseillaise)

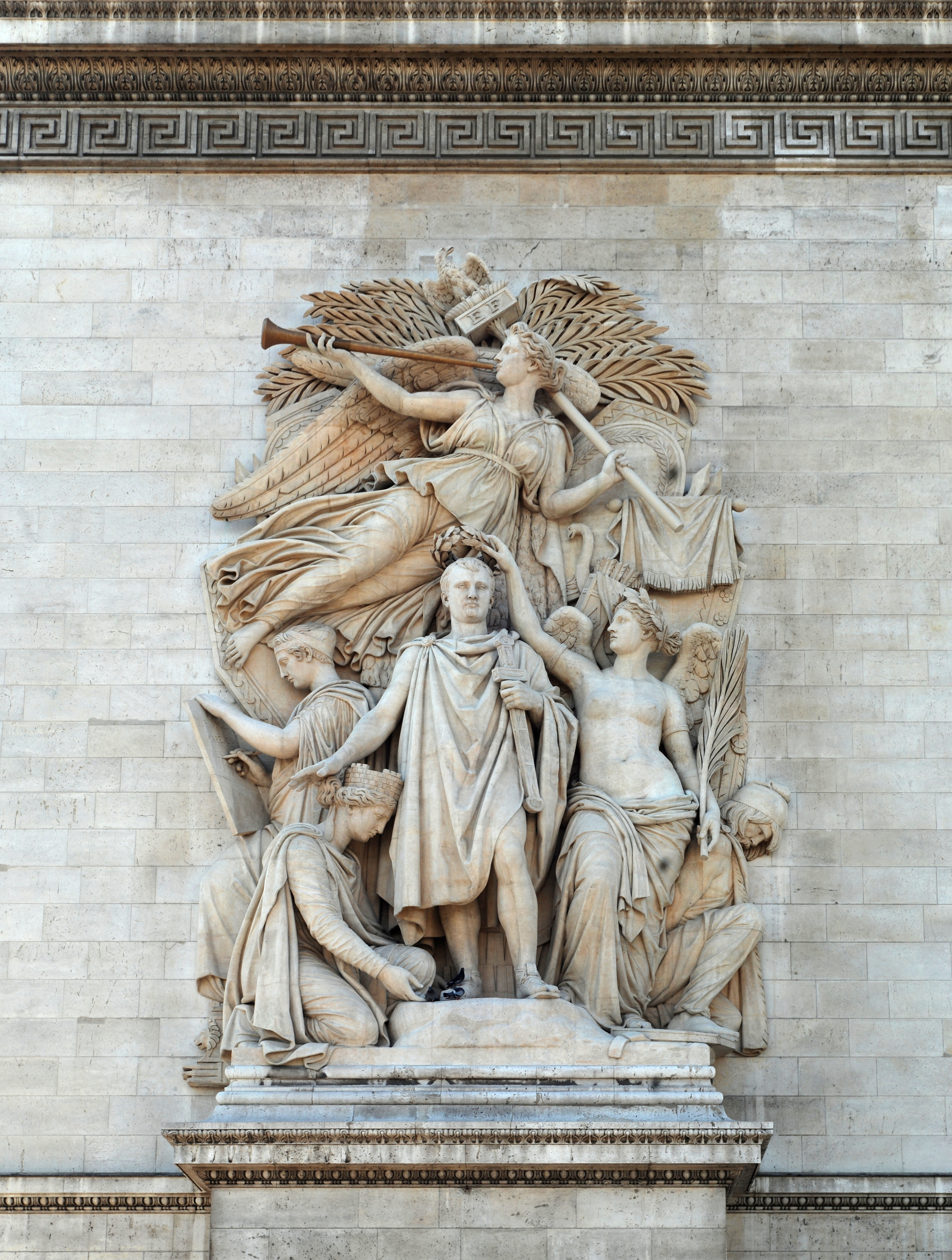
The Triumph of 1810

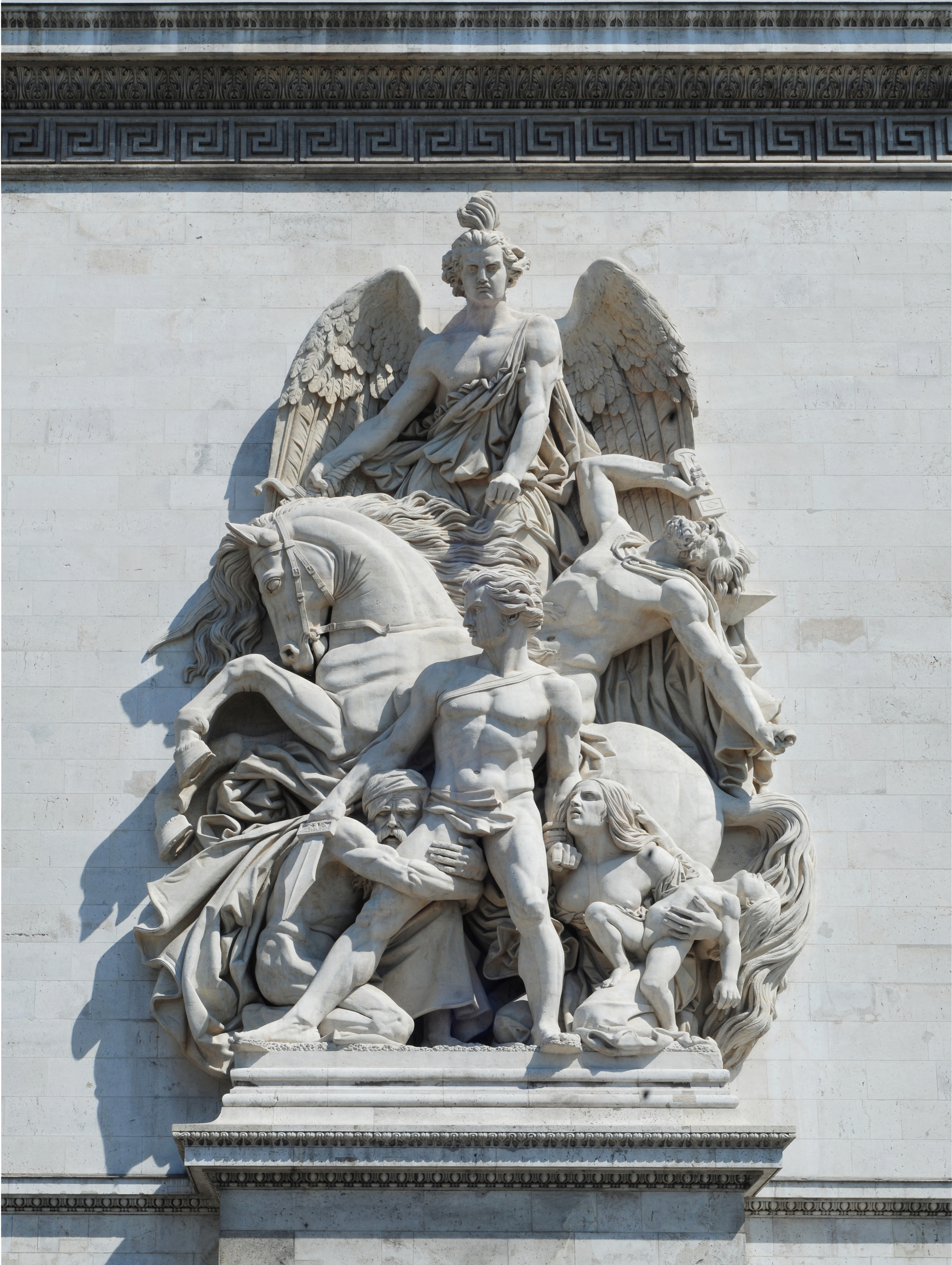
The Resistance of 1814

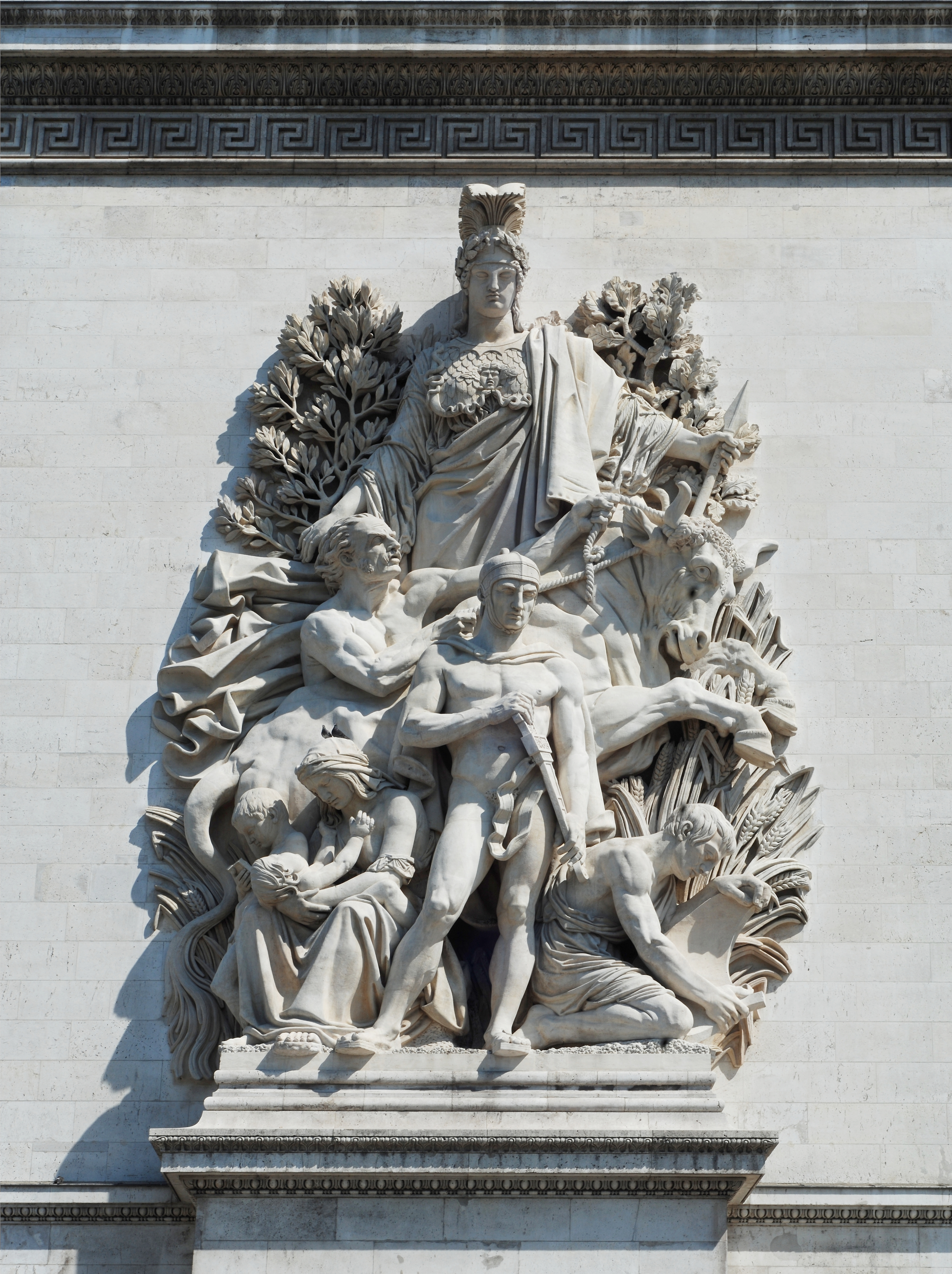
The Peace of 1815

Six reliefs sculpted on the façades of the arch, representing important moments of the French Revolution and of the Napoleonic era include:

- The Battle of Aboukir, 25 July 1799, by Bernard Seurre (southern façade, left).
- The Funeral of General Marceau, 21 September 1796, by Henri Lemaire (southern façade, right).
- The Battle of Jemappes, 6 November 1792, by Carlo Marochetti (eastern façade).
- The Capture of Alexandria, 3 July 1798, by John-Étienne Chaponnière (northern façade, left).
- The Crossing of the Arcole Bridge, 15 November 1796, by Jean-Jacques Feuchère (northern façade, right).
- The Battle of Austerlitz, 2 December 1805, by Théodore Gechter (western façade).

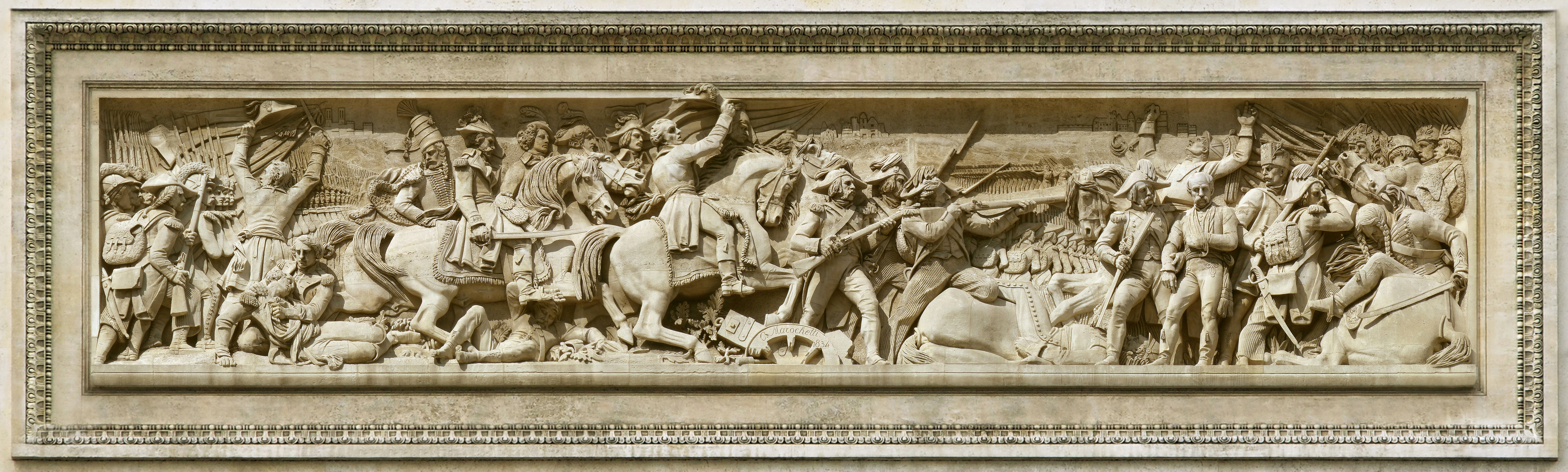
The Battle of Jemappes, 6 November 1792

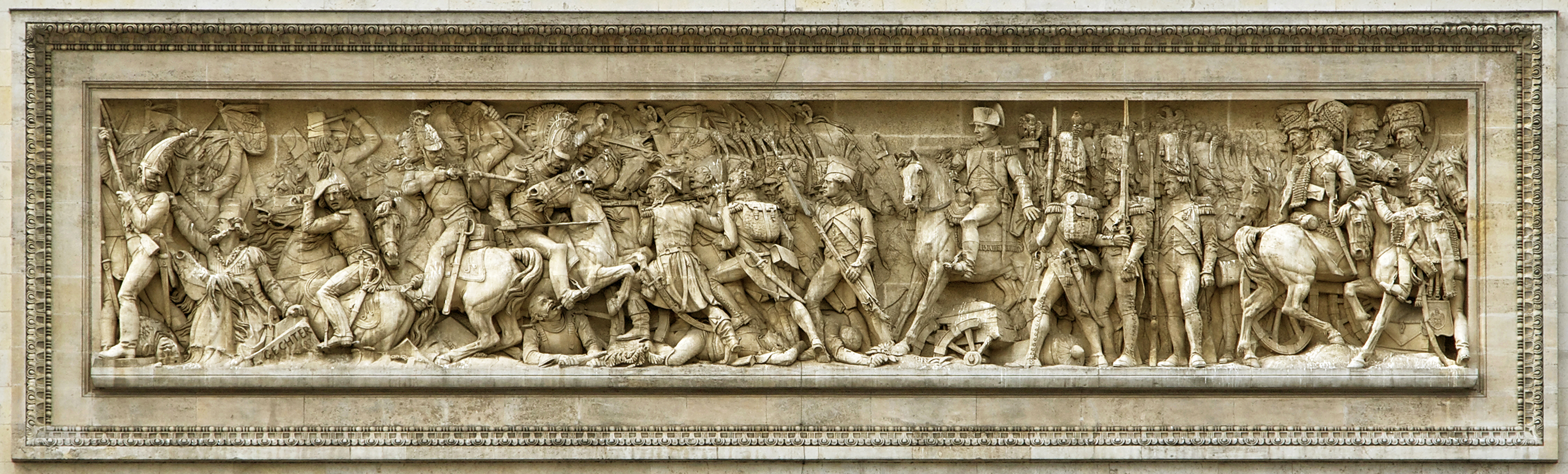
The Battle of Austerlitz, 2 December 1805
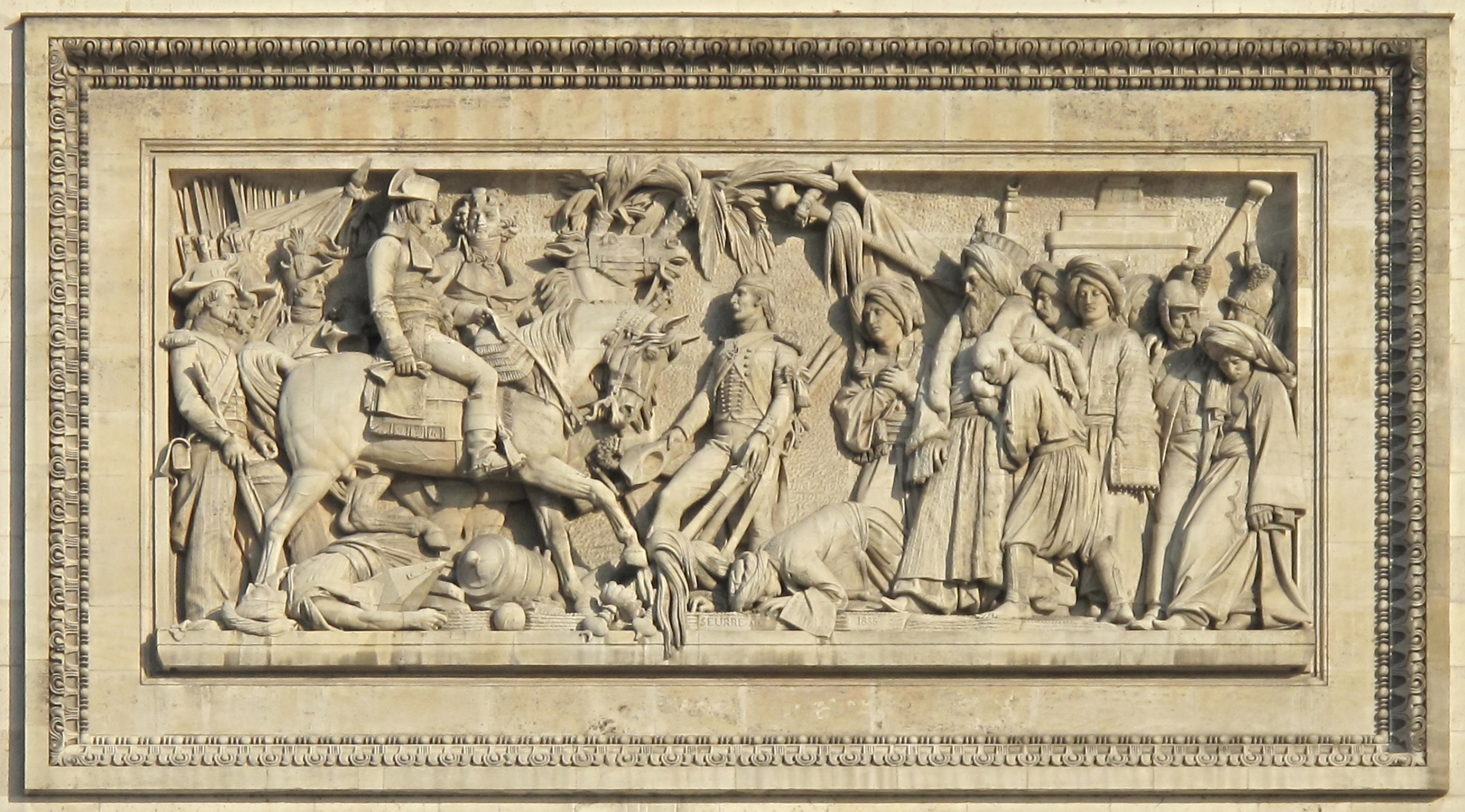
The Battle of Aboukir, 25 July 1799

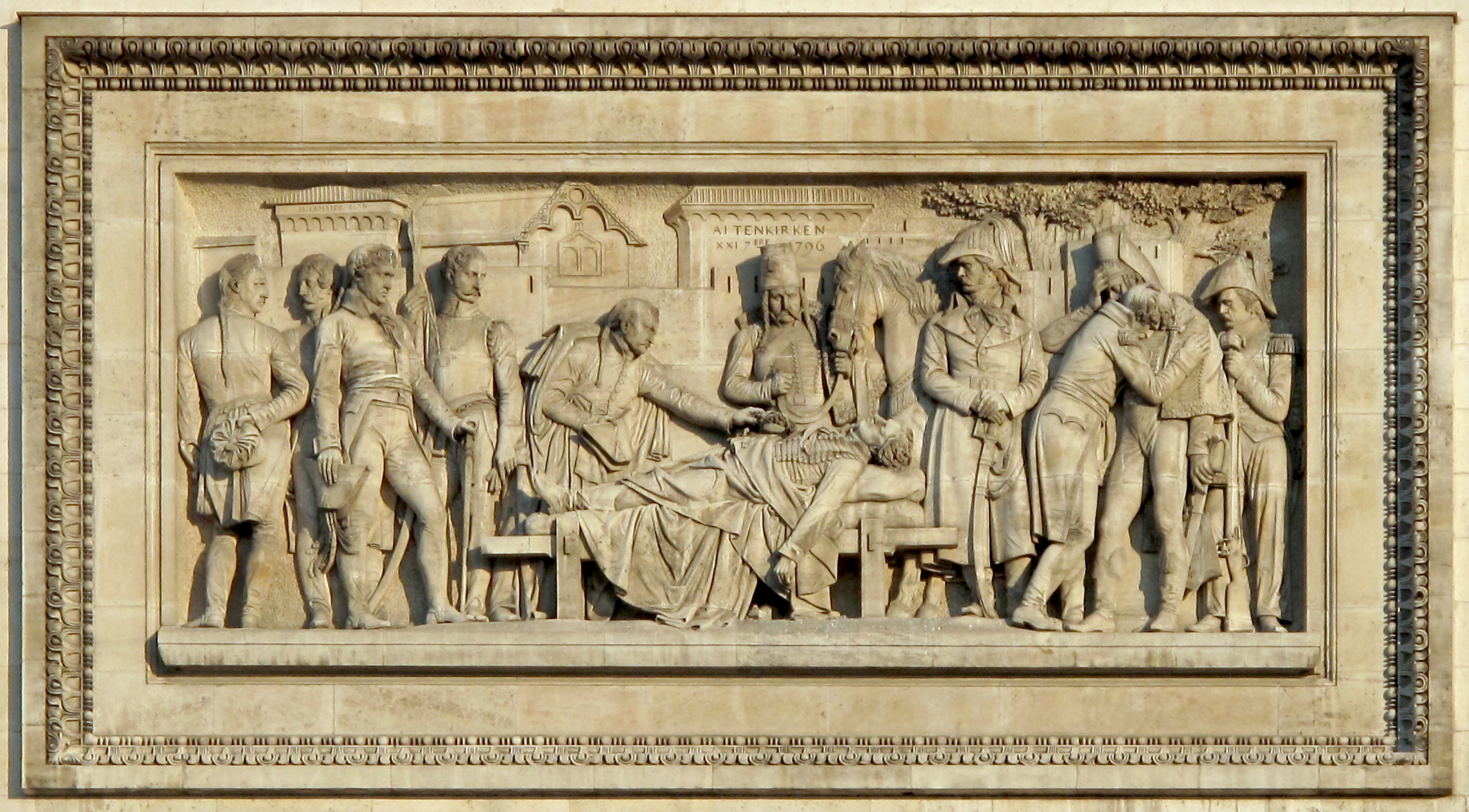
The Funeral of General Marceau, 21 September 1796

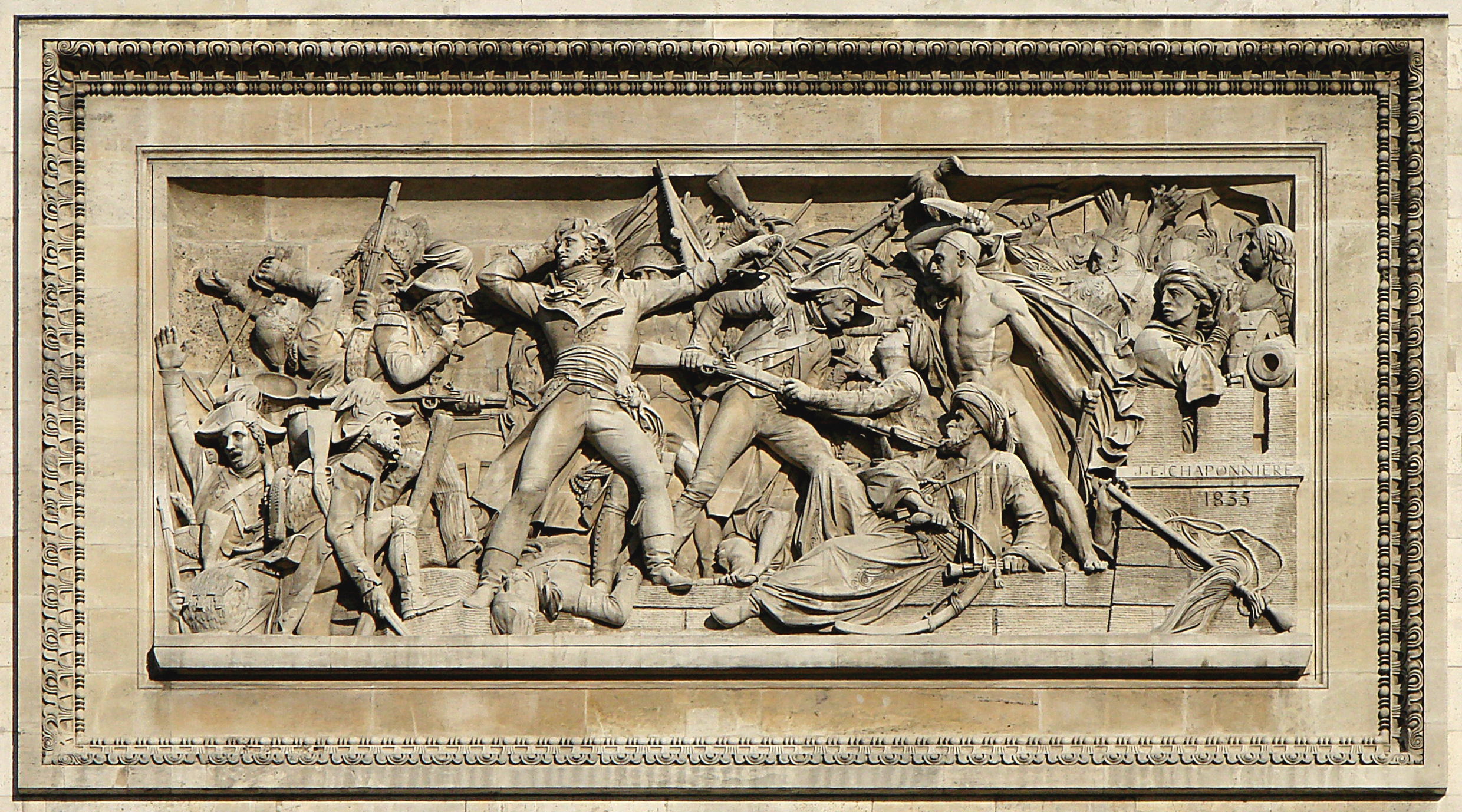
The Capture of Alexandria, 3 July 1798

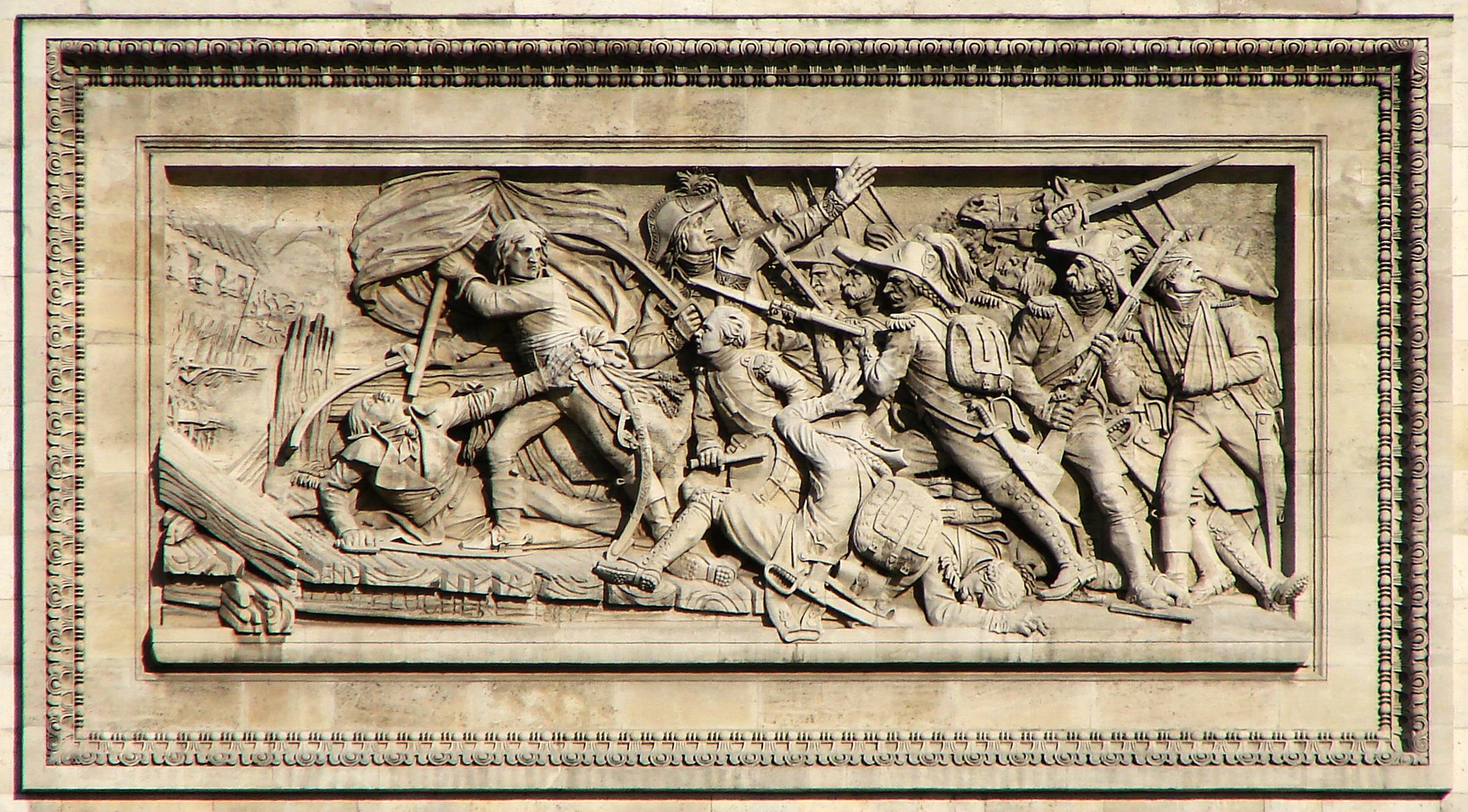
The Crossing of the Arcole Bridge, 15 November 1796

The names of 158 battles fought by the French First Republic and the First French Empire are engraved on the monument. Among them, 30 battles are engraved on the attic, and 96 battles are engraved on the inner façades, under the great arches.

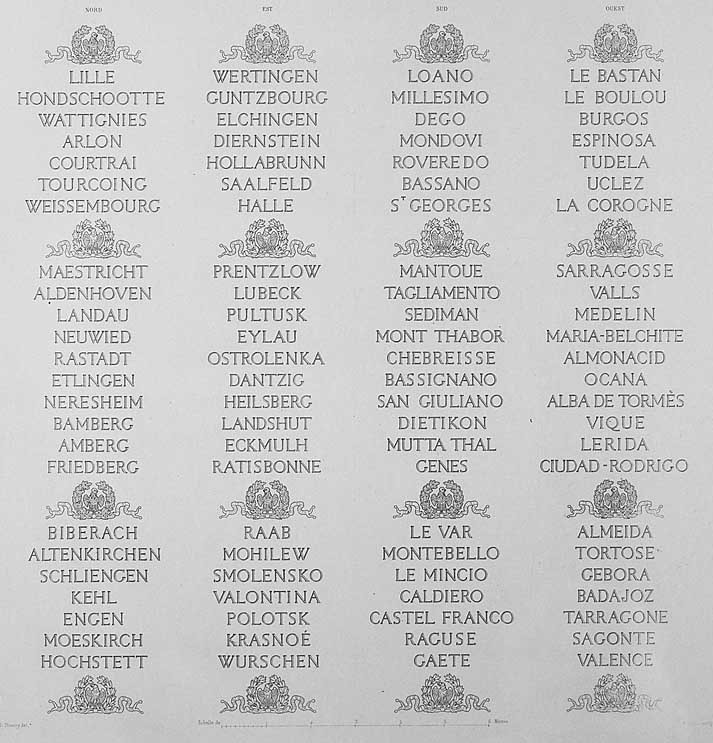
List of battles engraved under the great arches of the monument

The names of 660 military leaders who served during the French First Republic and the First French Empire are engraved on the inner façades of the small arches. Underlined names signify those who died on the battlefield.

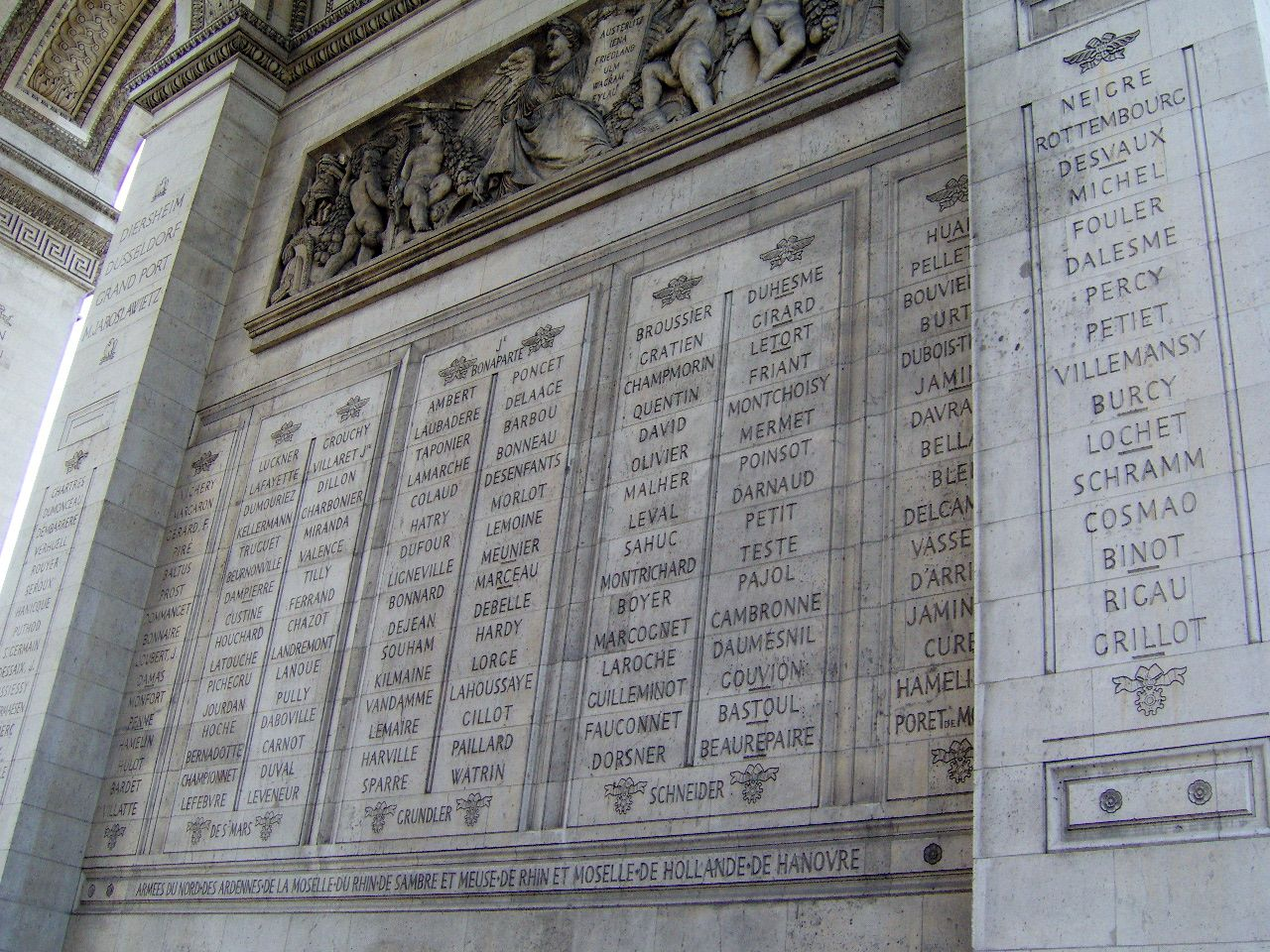
Northern pillar

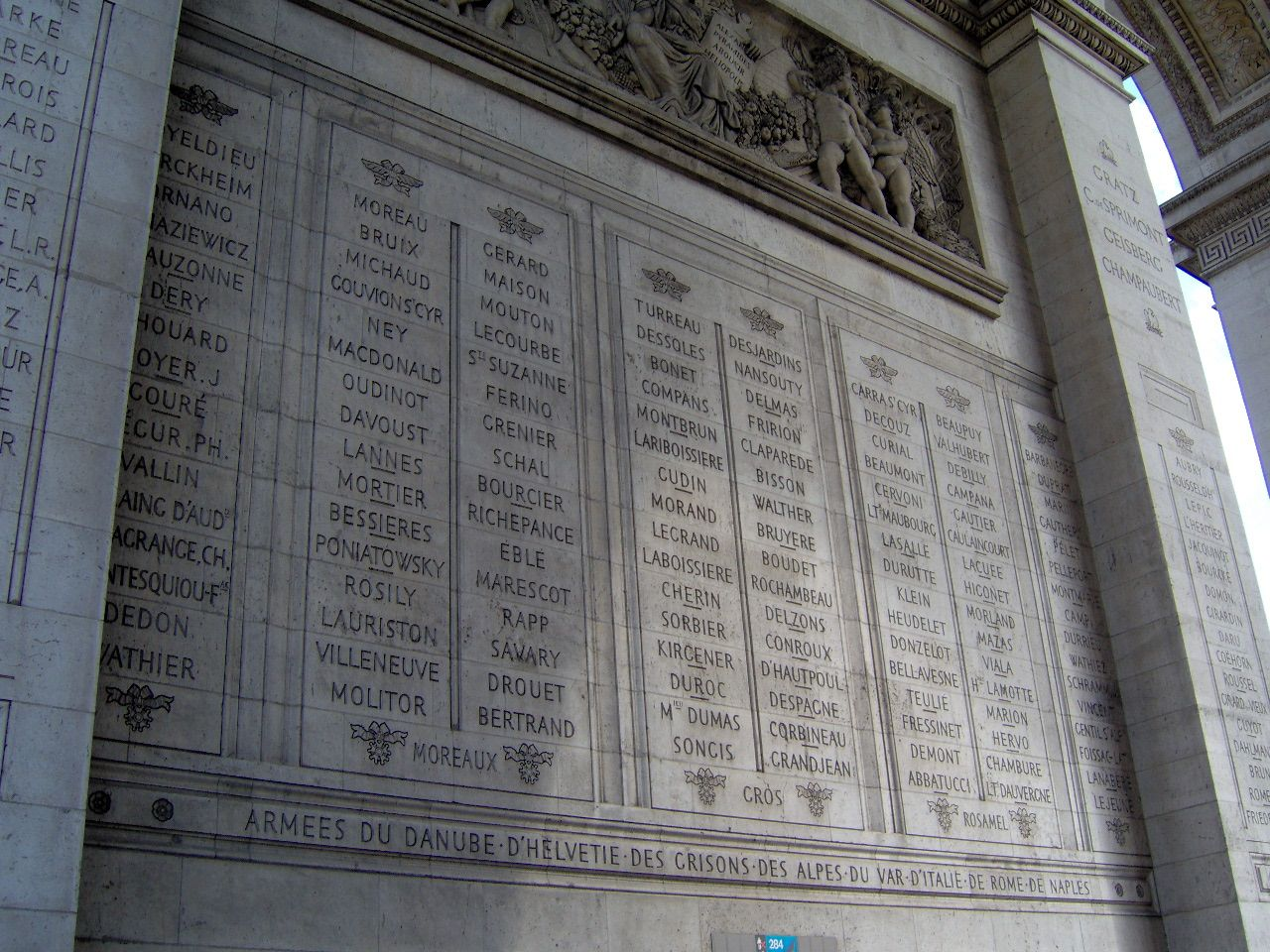
Eastern pillar

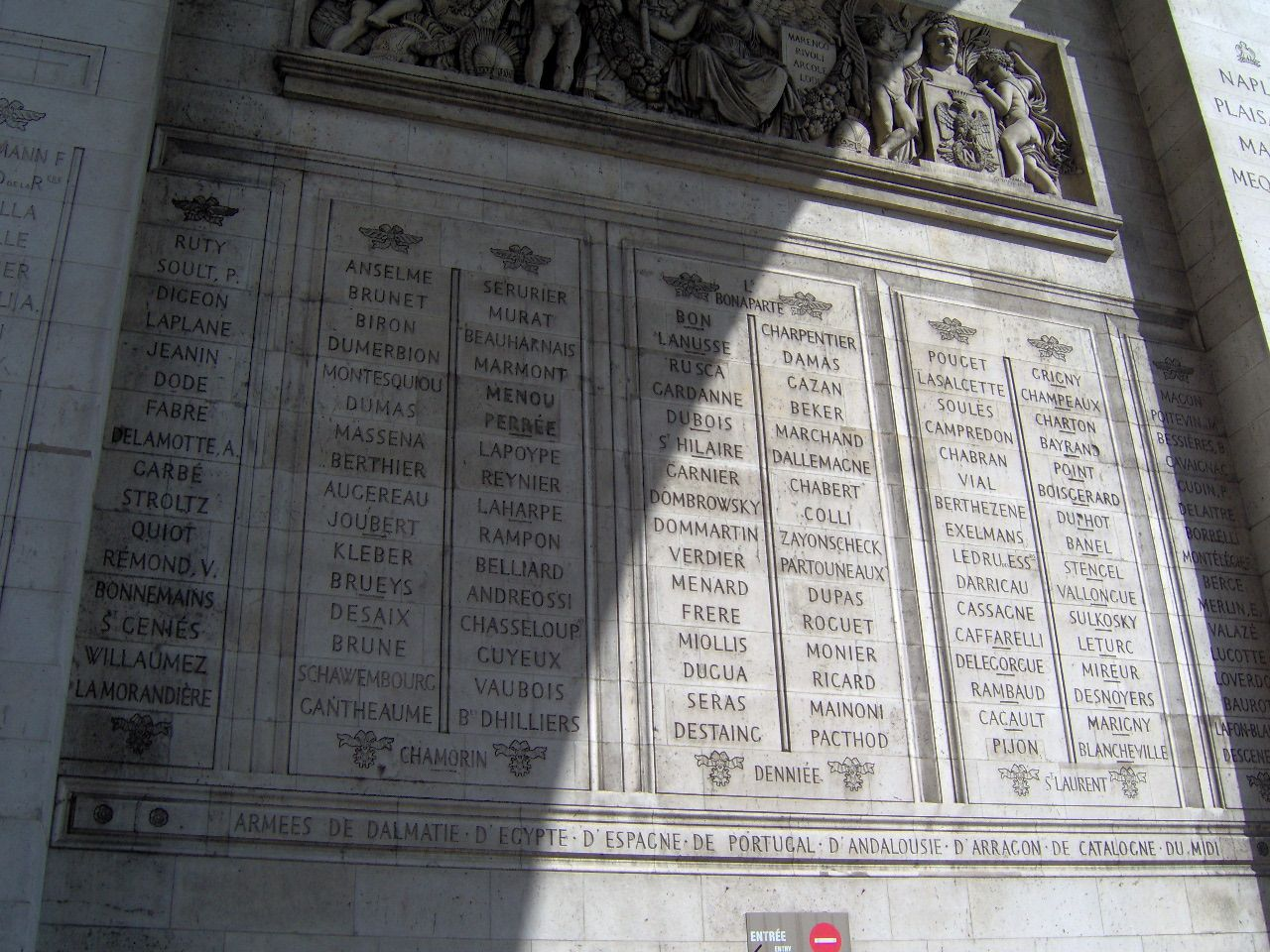
Southern pillar

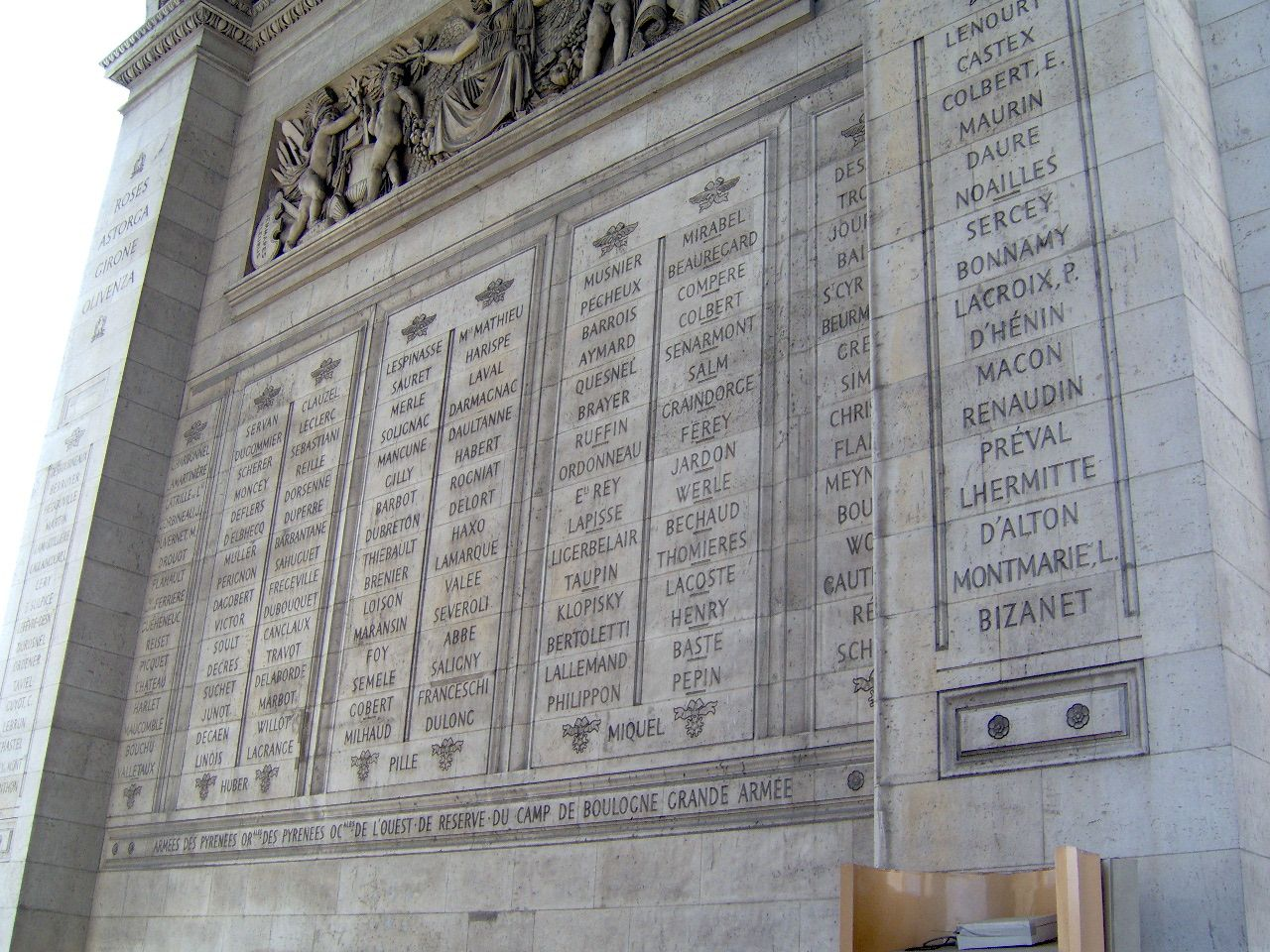
Western pillar

The spandrels of the great arches are decorated with allegorical figures representing characters in Roman mythology (by James Pradier). The ceilings of the monument are adorned with sculpted roses.

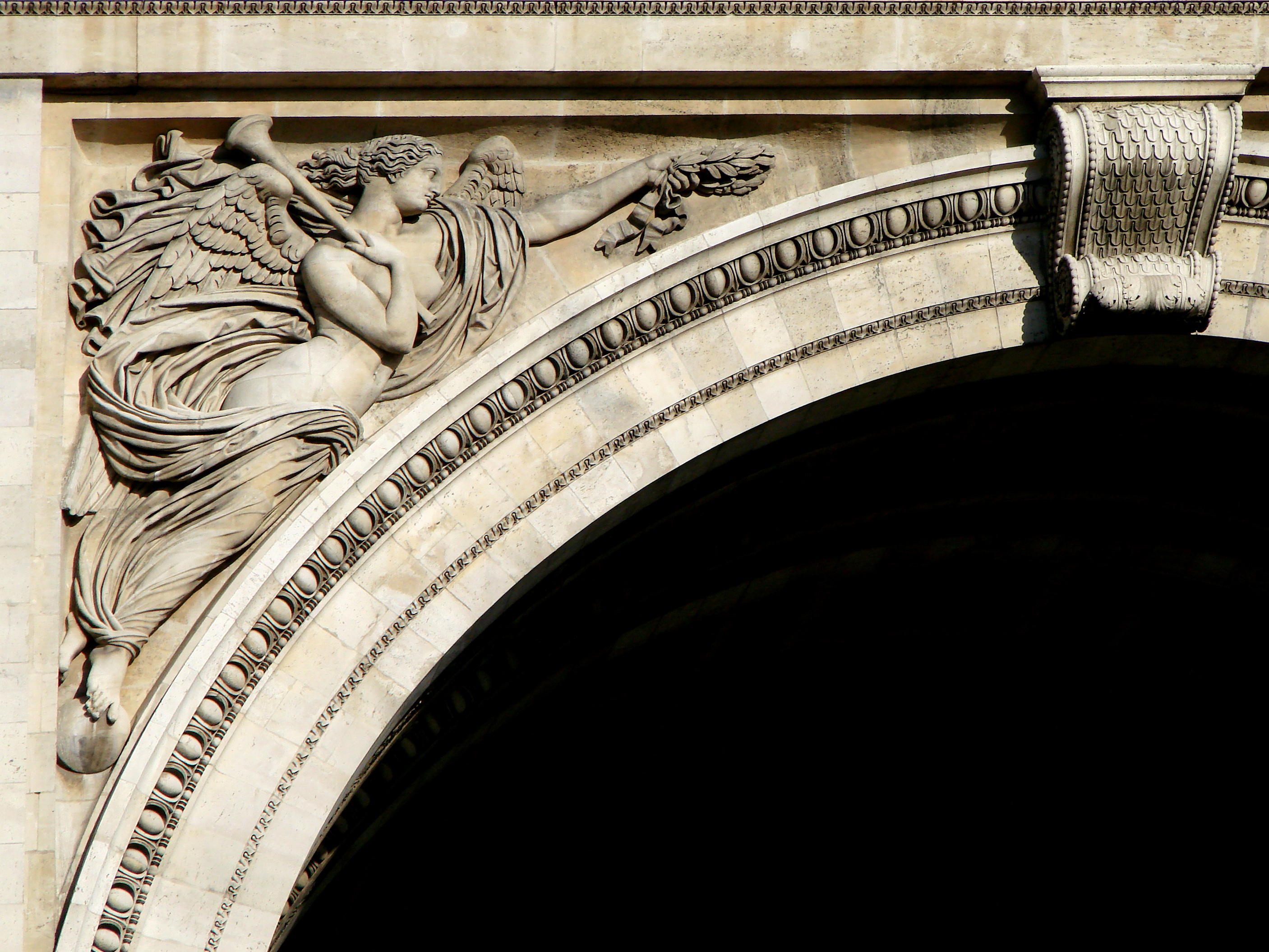
Figure of Pheme (northern façade, left spandrel)

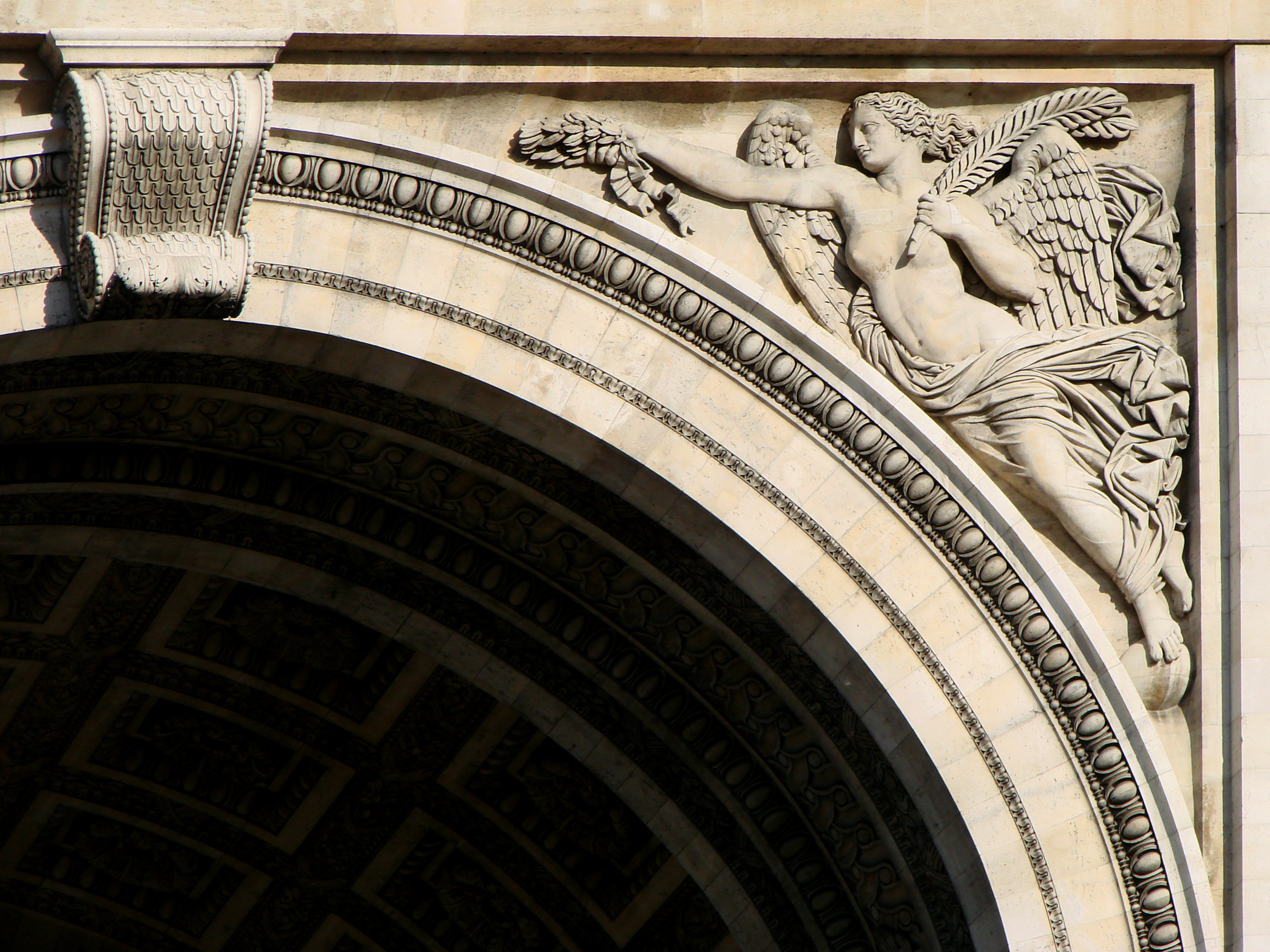
Figure of Victoria (northern façade, right spandrel)

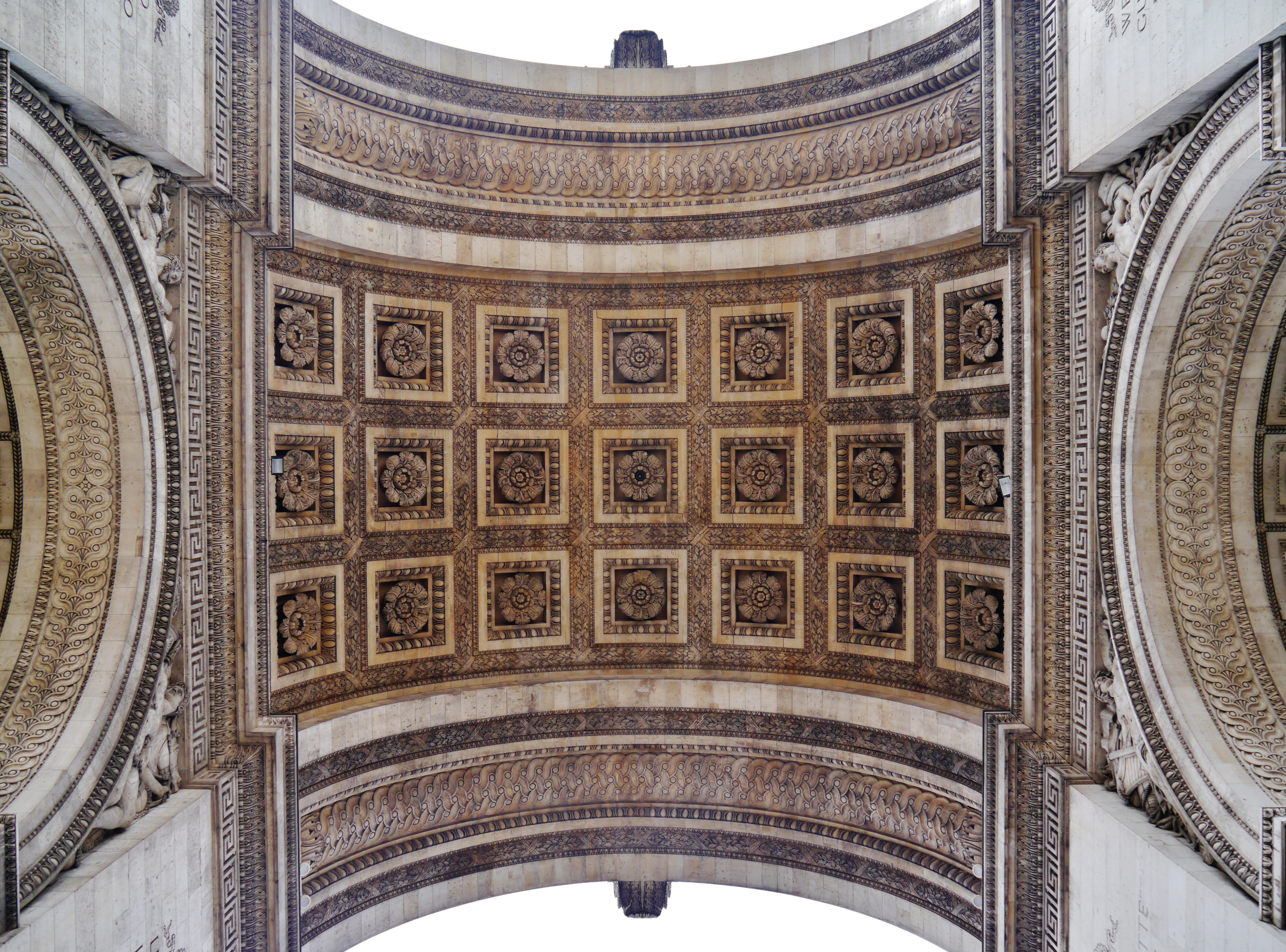
Ceiling of the great archway

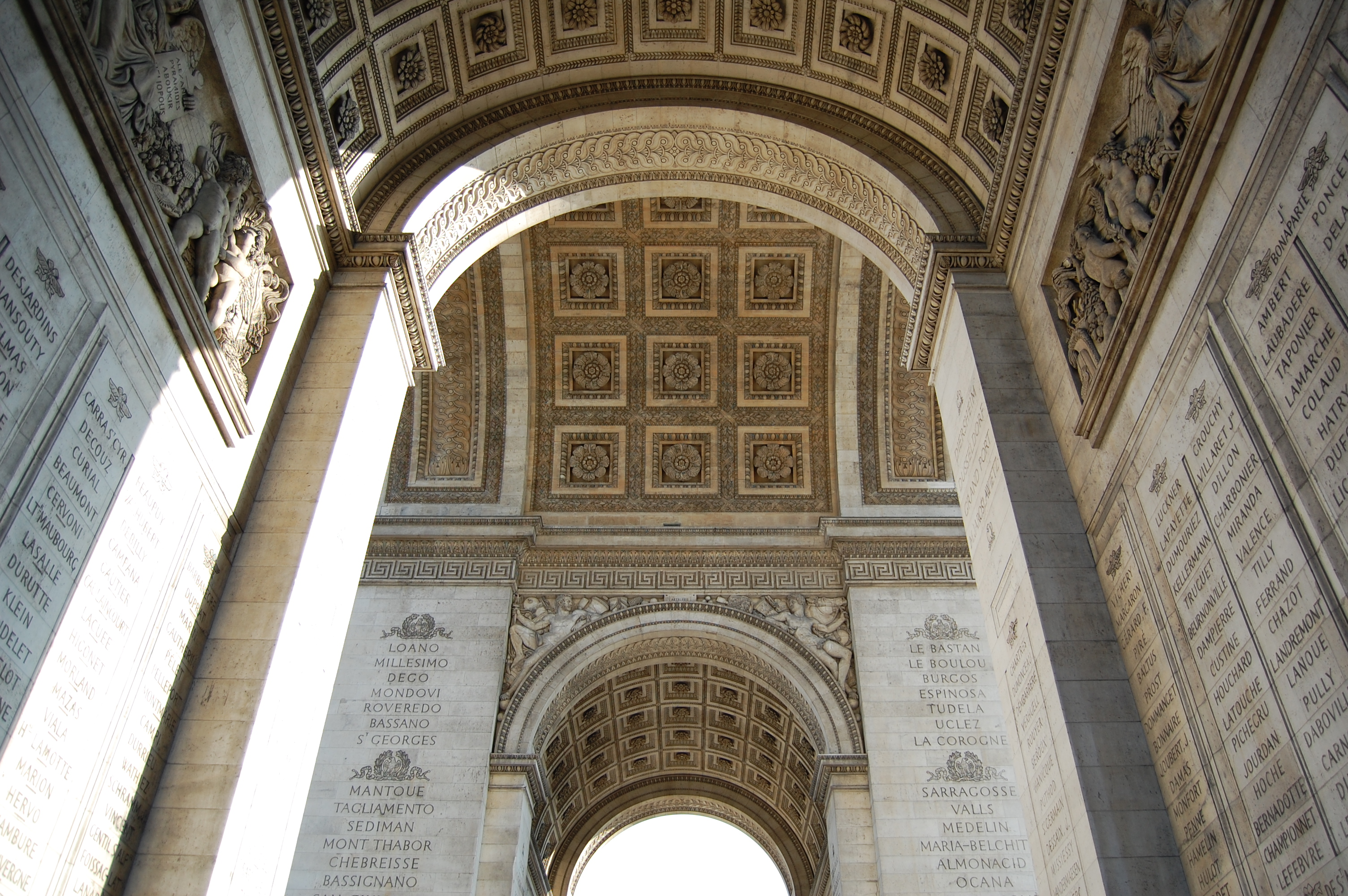
Ceilings of the great and small archways

== Access ==
The Arc de Triomphe is accessible by the RER and Metro, with the closest stop being Charles de Gaulle–Étoile. Due to heavy traffic on the roundabout of which the Arc is the centre, pedestrians use two underpasses accessible from the Champs-Élysées and the Grande Armée avenues. The ascent to the rooftop terrace comprises 284 steps. It begins with a 240-step spiral staircase leading to the mezzanine floor in the attic of the monument. Above the mezzanine is the museum hall, where large models of the Arc and interactive exhibits on its history, construction, and cultural significance are displayed. Approximately 40 further steps lead to the rooftop terrace, offering panoramic views of Paris. Elevators providing access to the museum and rooftop terrace are available.

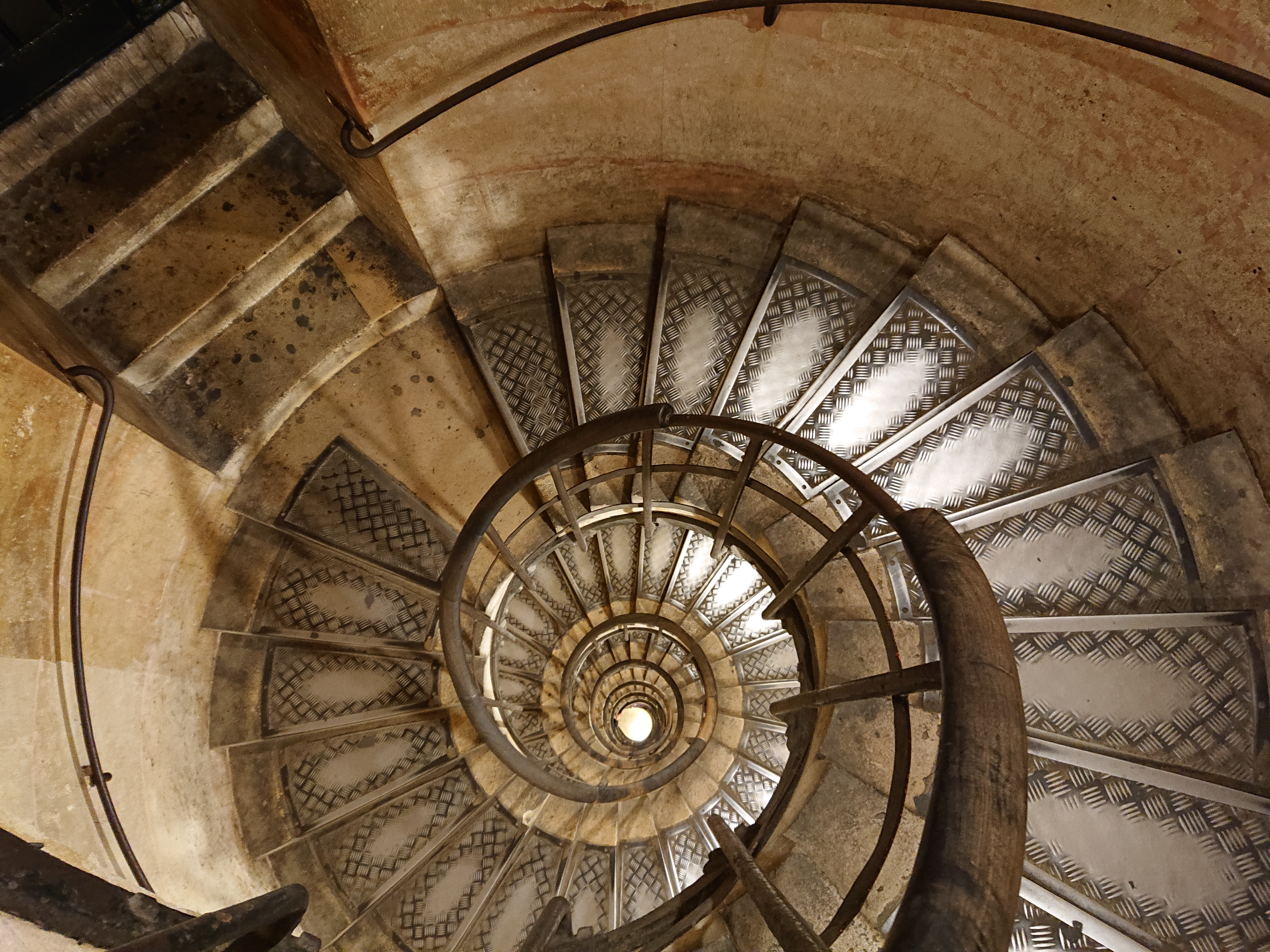
Spiral staircase within one of the four pillars of the arch

Mezzanine floor in the attic, below the museum hall

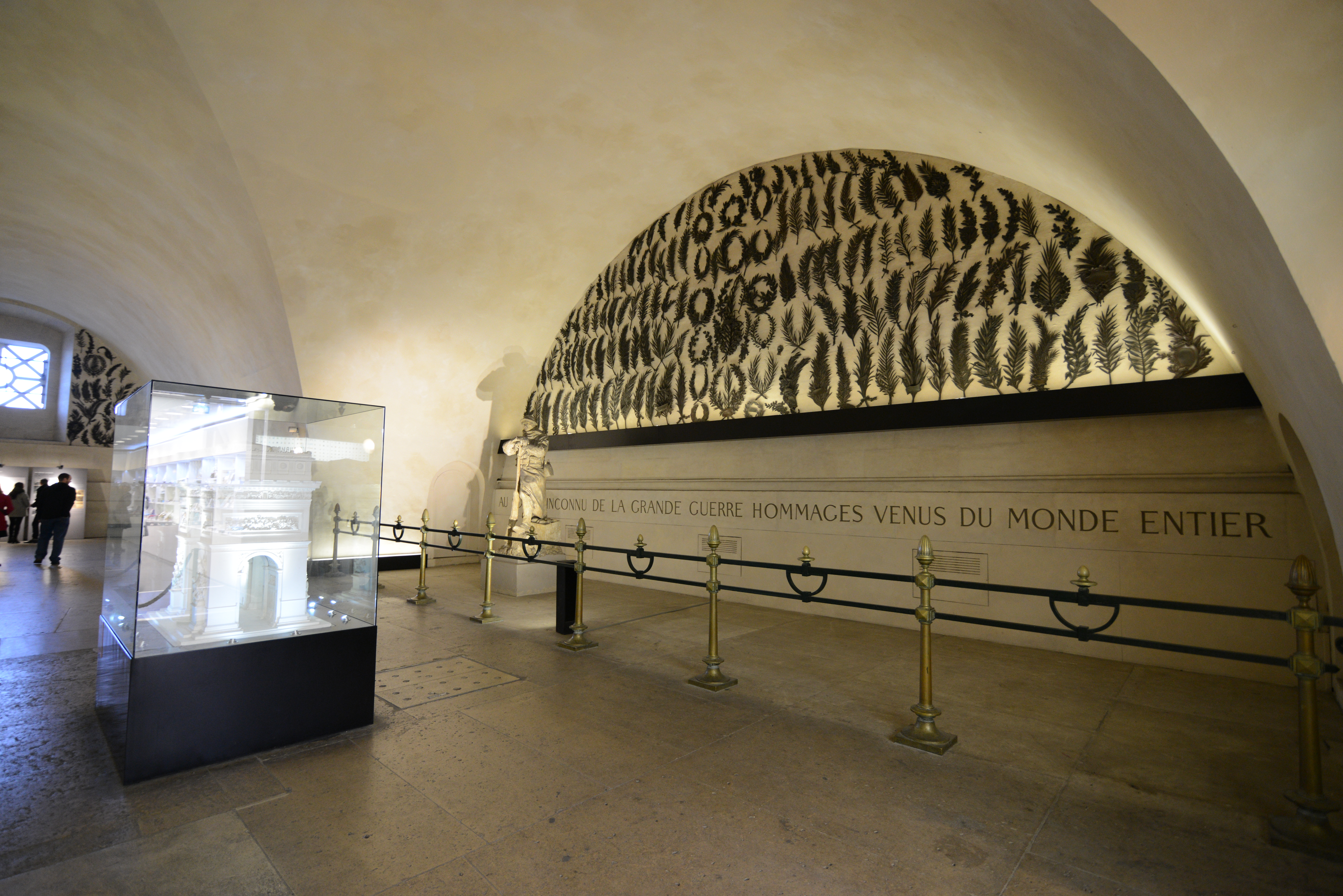
Museum hall in the attic, below the rooftop terrace

Stairs leading to the rooftop terrace

The location of the Arc, as well as the Place de l'Étoile, is shared between three arrondissements: the 16th (to the south and west), the 17th (to the north), and the 8th (to the east).

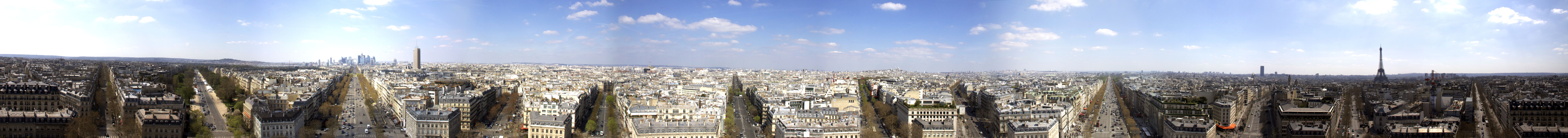
Paris seen from the rooftop terrace of the Arc de Triomphe

== Replicas ==
While many structures around the world resemble the Arc de Triomphe, some were actually inspired by it. Replicas that used its design as a model include the Rosedale World War I Memorial Arch in Kansas City, United States (1924); the Arcul de Triumf in Bucharest, Romania (1936); the Arch of Triumph in Pyongyang, North Korea (1982); a miniature version at the Paris Casino in Las Vegas, United States (1999); and the Simpang Lima Gumul Monument in Kediri, Indonesia (2008).

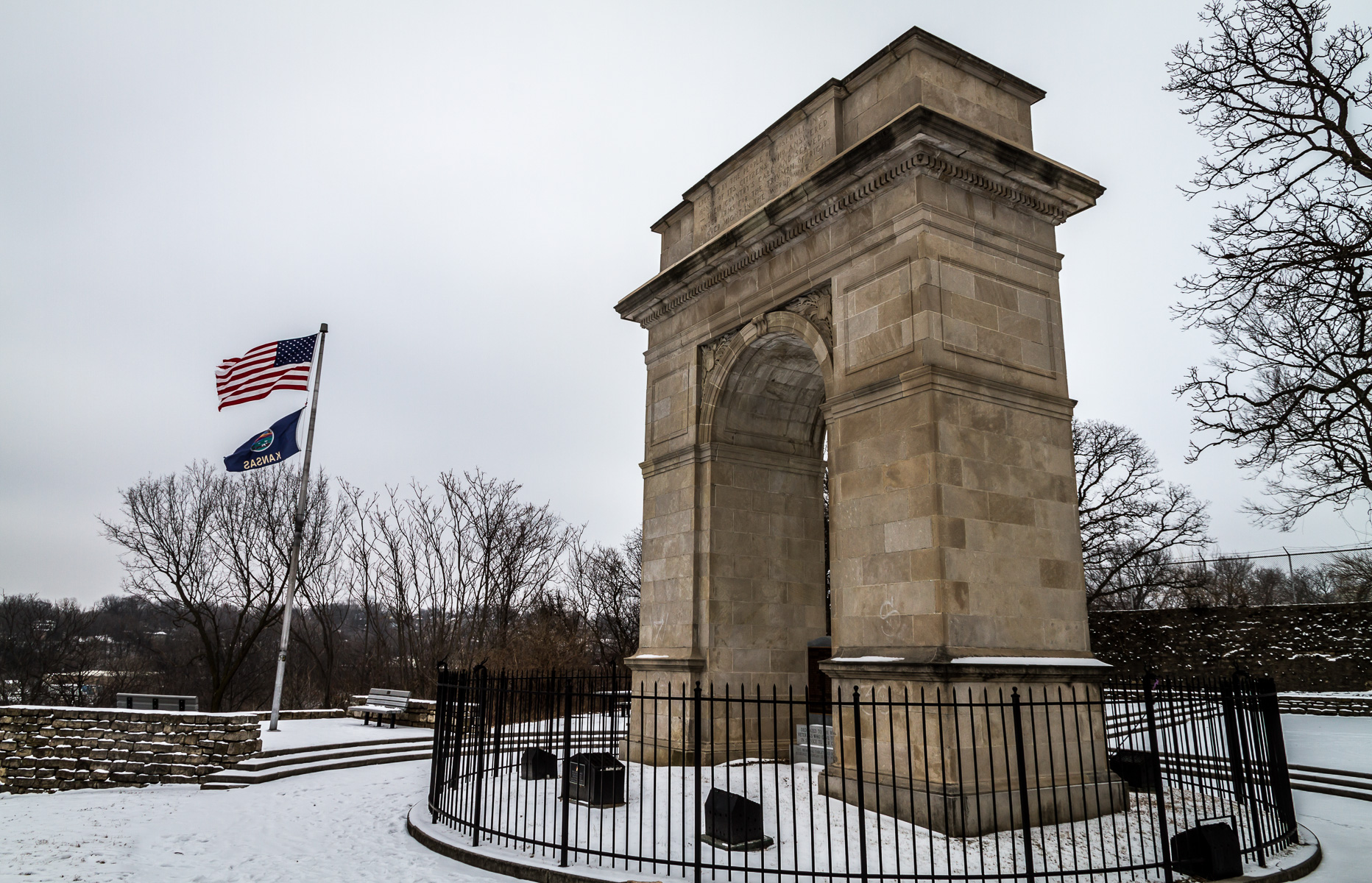
Rosedale Arch in Kansas City, United States

Arcul de Triumf in Bucharest, Romania

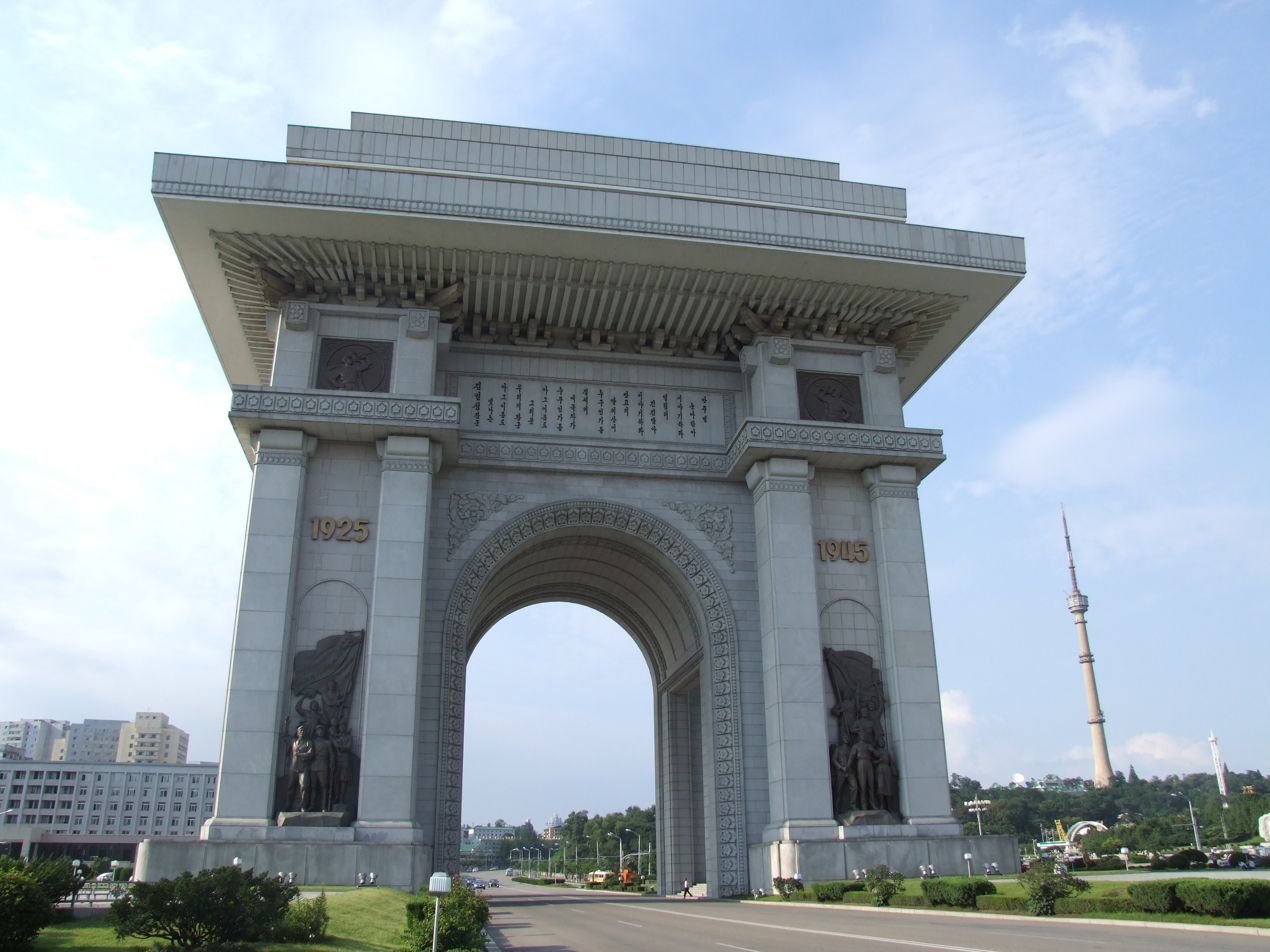
Arch of Triumph in Pyongyang, North Korea

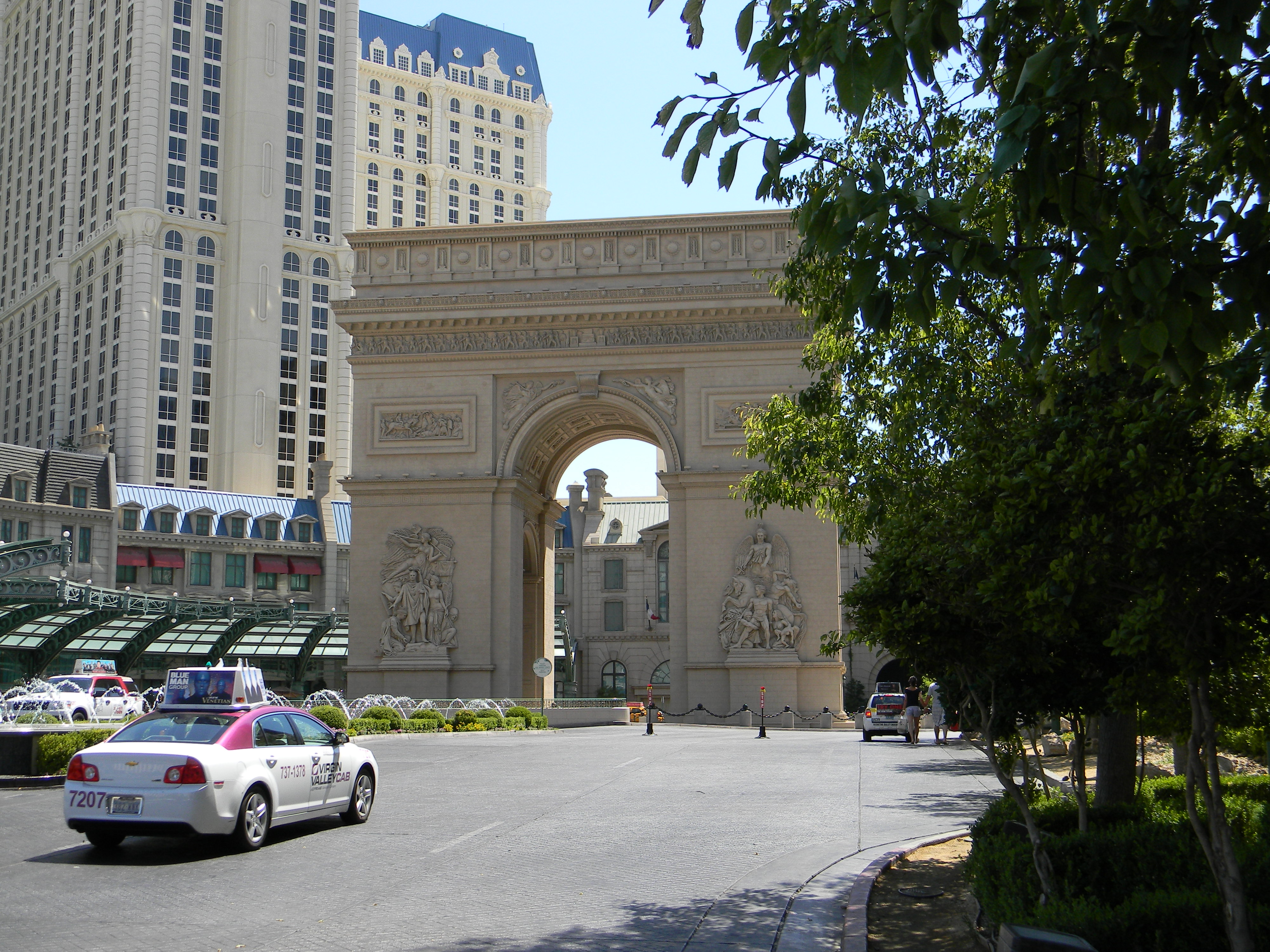
Paris Casino in Las Vegas, United States

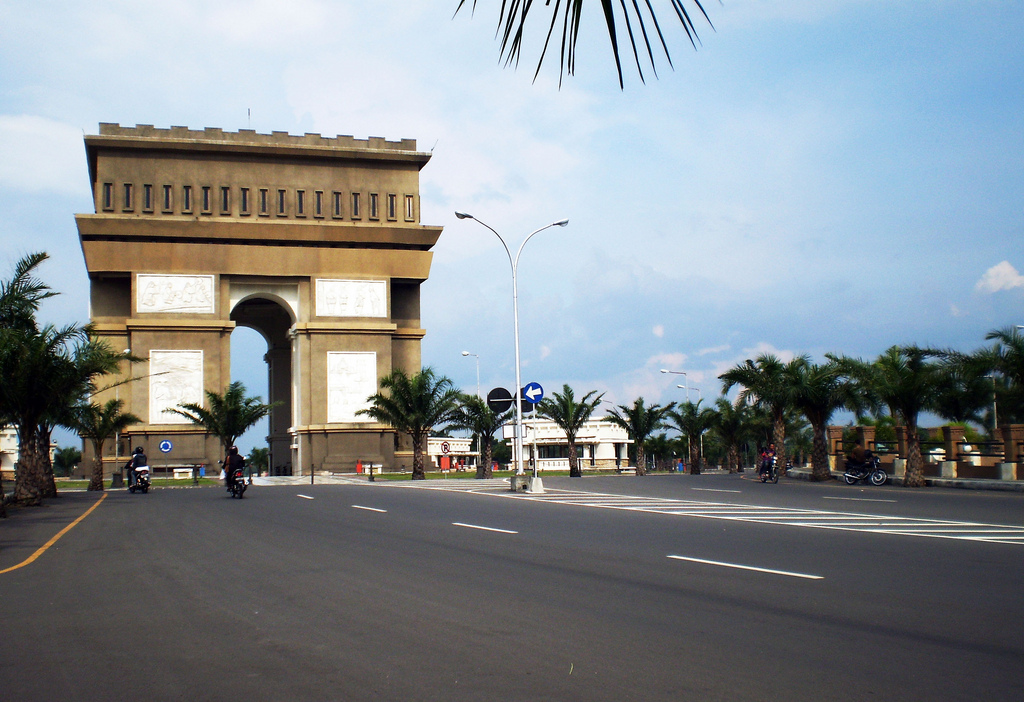
Simpang Lima Gumul Monument in Kediri, Indonesia

== See also ==
- Names inscribed on the Arc de Triomphe
- Battles inscribed on the Arc de Triomphe
- Napoleon's tomb
- Bastille Day military parade
- List of tourist attractions in Paris
- List of post-Roman triumphal arches
- United States Triumphal Arch
