= Jean Maximilien Lamarque =

French army officer and politician (1770–1832)

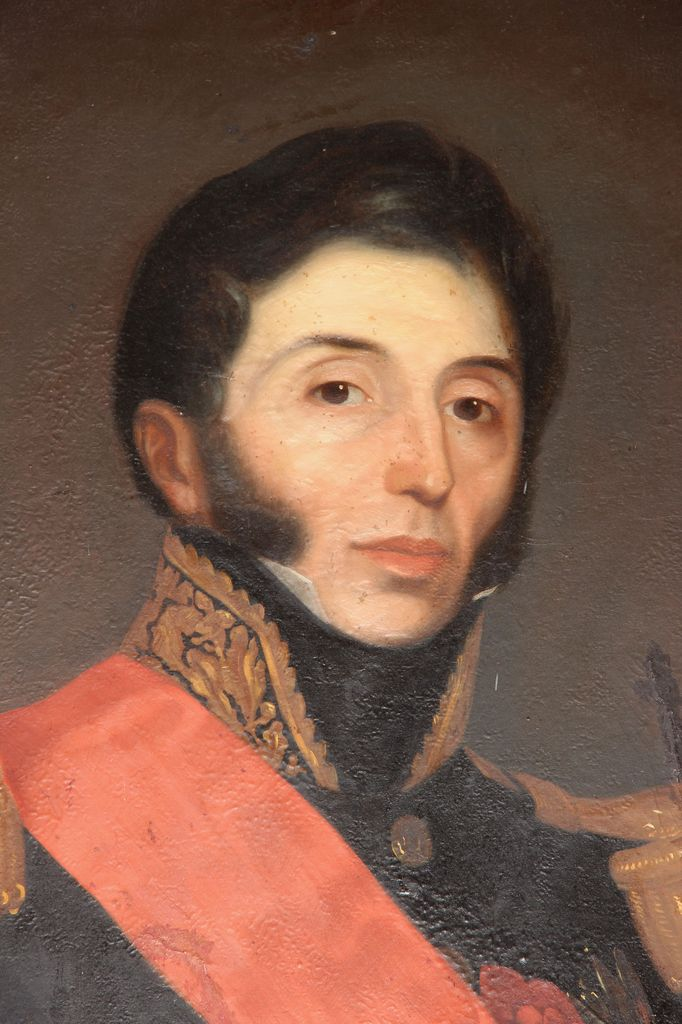
- Anonymous oil painting of Lamarque
- Born: 22 July 1770; Saint-Sever, France
- Died: 1 June 1832 (aged 61) Paris, France
- Allegiance: Kingdom of France; French First Republic; French First Empire; Kingdom of Naples
- Branch: French Royal Army; French Revolutionary Army; French Imperial Army; Army of the Kingdom of Naples
- Service years: 1791–1830
- Rank: Divisional-General
- Conflicts: French Revolutionary Wars; Napoleonic Wars
- Awards: Royal Order of the Two-Sicilies Légion d'honneur
- Other work: Politician; Writer

Divisional-General Jean Maximilien Lamarque (22 July 1770 – 1 June 1832) was a French army officer and politician who served in the French Revolutionary and Napoleonic Wars. Lamarque served with distinction in many of Napoleon's campaigns, and was known for retaking Capri from the British in 1808 and defeating French Royalists in the Vendée in 1815. The latter campaign received great praise from Napoleon, who said Lamarque had "performed wonders, and even surpassed my hopes".

After the Bourbon Restoration in France, Lamarque became an outspoken opponent of the return of the ancien régime. With the overthrow of the Bourbons in the July Revolution of 1830, he was placed in command of a force to suppress any uprisings by their supporters, known as the Legitimists.

However, he soon became a leading critic of the new constitutional monarchy of Louis Philippe I, arguing that it failed to support human rights and political liberty. He also advocated French support for revolutionary struggles in Poland and Italy. Lamarque's views made him a popular figure. His death was the catalyst of the June Rebellion of 1832, which provided the background for events depicted in Victor Hugo's novel Les Misérables.

== Early life ==
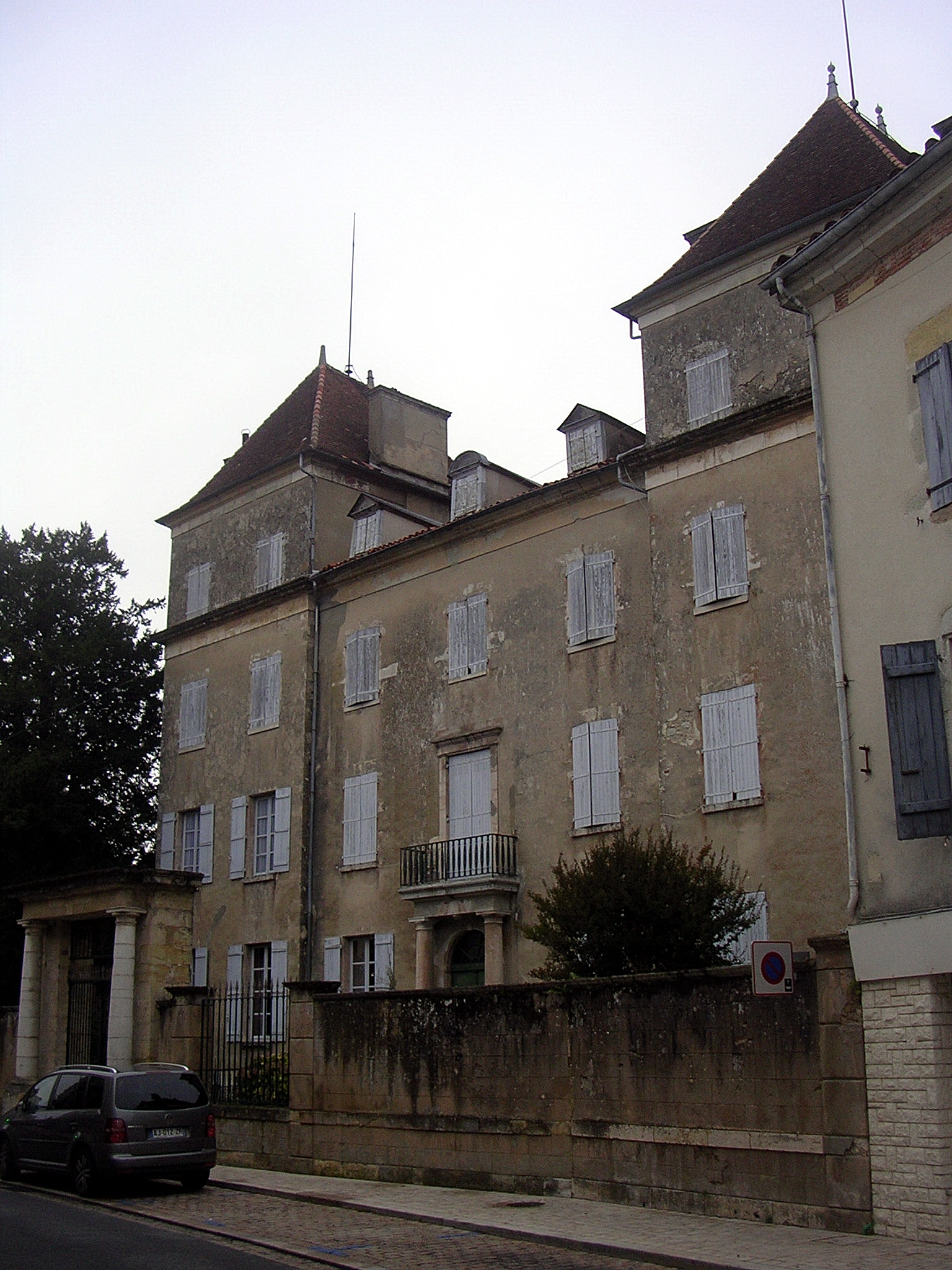
Lamarque's home in Saint-Sever

Born in Saint-Sever in the Landes department of France, Lamarque was a member of a powerful and influential family. His father Pierre Joseph Lamarque (1733–1802) was a lawyer and seneschal of Saint-Sever. His uncle Jean-Jacques Lamarque (1737–1809) was director of a theological college and was persecuted during the Reign of Terror. Lamarque's father was elected a member of the Third Estate to the Estates General of 1789 and took the Tennis Court Oath. He became a member of the National Constituent Assembly.

Lamarque joined his father in Paris and joined the army in 1791. He was involved in early revolutionary and anti-clerical activity. He was a member of a battalion that gutted and then burned Vabres Cathedral, after removing a marble altar to build a monument for the recently murdered Jean-Paul Marat.

== Revolutionary Wars ==
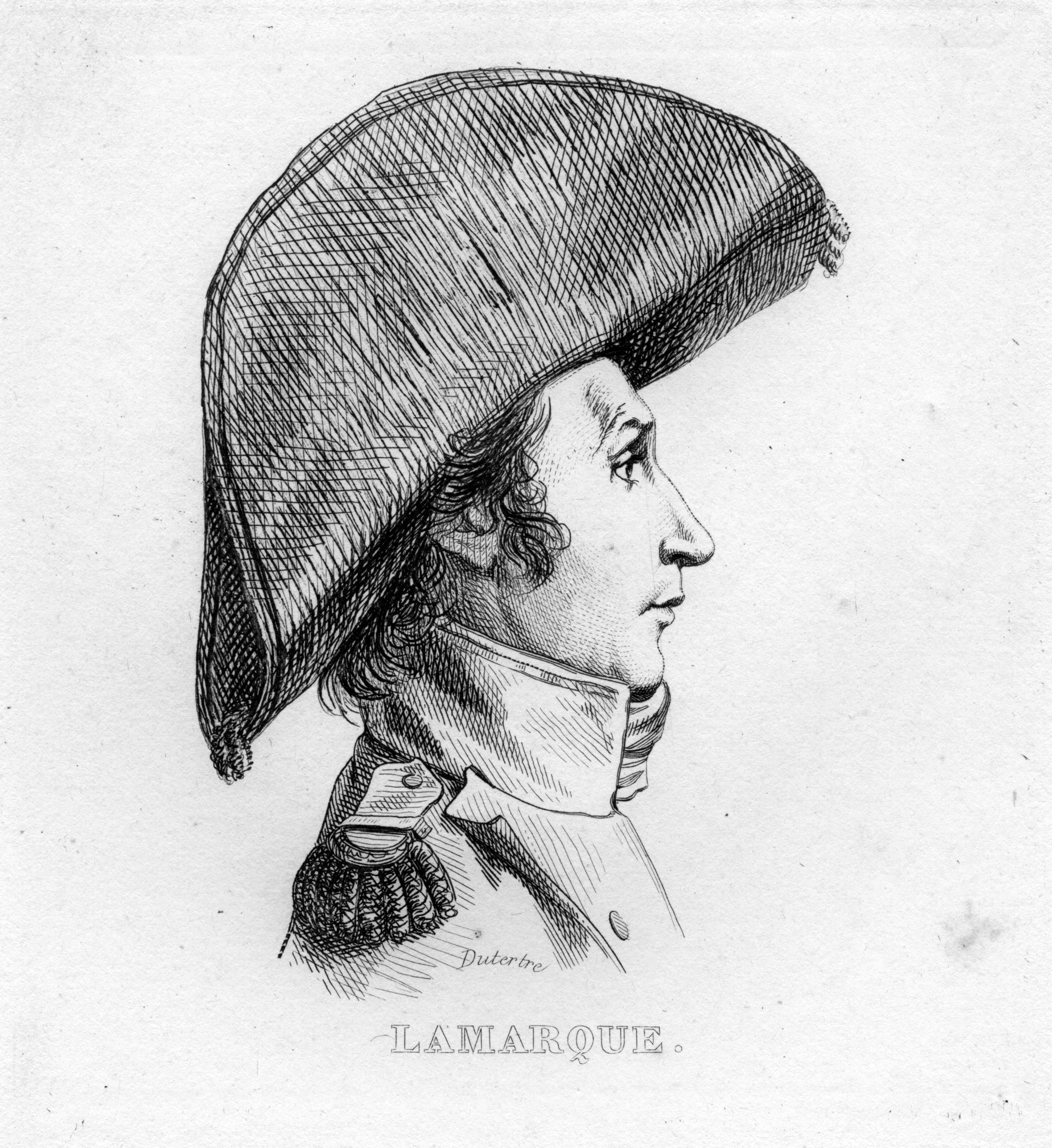
Profile portrait by André Dutertre

In January 1792, Lamarque enlisted in the 4th Landes Battalion as a grenadier, and was promoted to lieutenant on 3 April 1793. By May he was a captain of grenadiers, participating in the "colonne infernale" led by Théophile Corret de la Tour d'Auvergne in the Army of the Western Pyrenees. He was wounded twice on 6 February 1794, and distinguished himself in July 1794 by successfully taking Hondarribia, defended by 1700 men, with a small force. He was promoted once more and transferred to the Army of the Rhine. He participated with distinction at the battles of Engen (3 May 1800), Messkirch (4-5 May 1800), Biberach (9 May 1800), Höchstädt (19 June 1800) and Hohenlinden (3 December 1800). In the last action he was so successful that General Moreau recommended him to Napoleon to receive the rank of brigade general, which he was given in March 1801.

== Napoleonic Wars ==
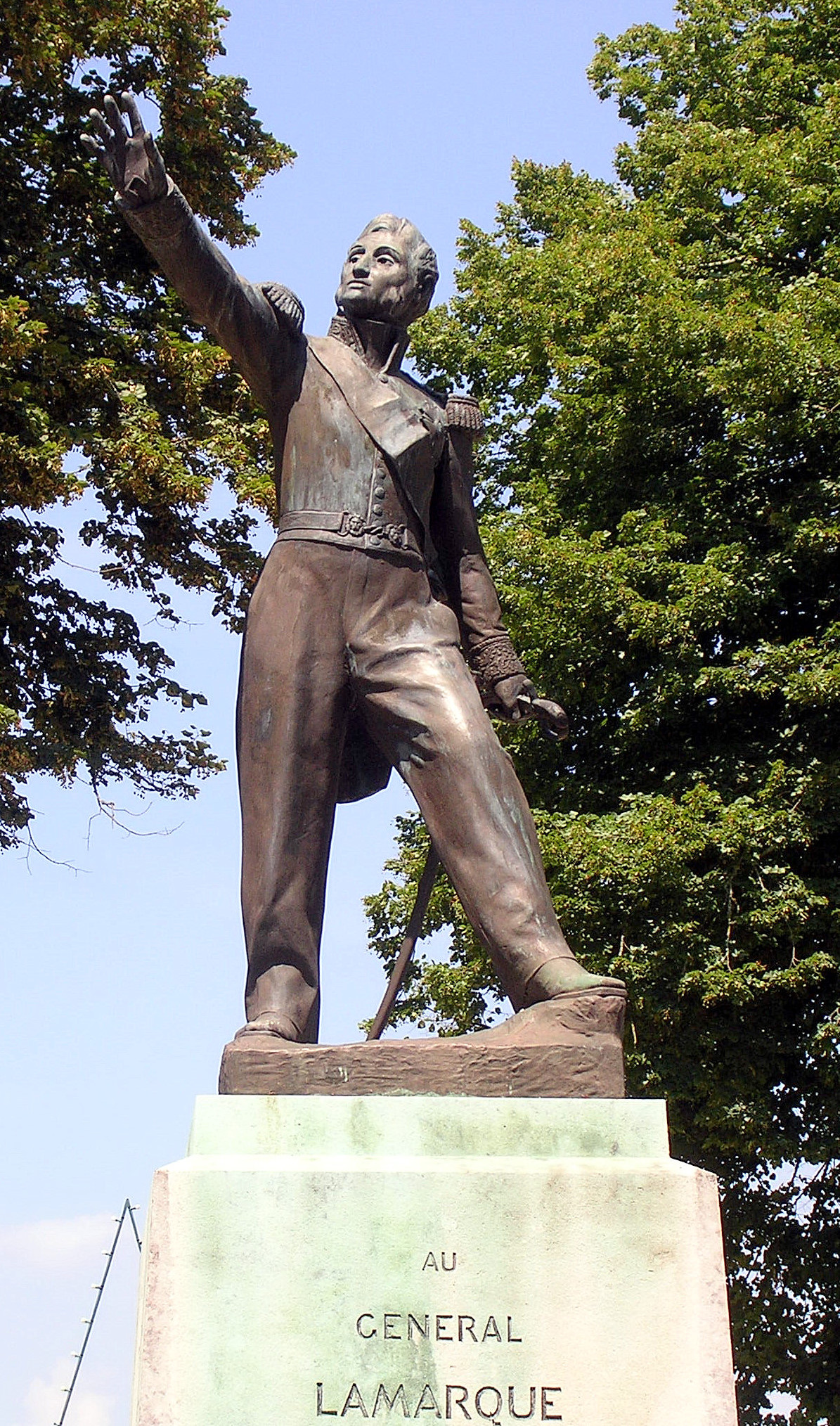
Statue of General Lamarque in Saint-Sever, Landes

On the outbreak of the War of the Third Coalition, Lamarque served in the Grande Armée and fought at the Battle of Austerlitz. In 1806, he followed Marshal Masséna and Joseph Bonaparte in the invasion of Naples, where he took part in the Siege of Gaeta and fought the insurgents led by Fra Diavolo. In 1807, after Joseph Bonaparte was made King of Naples, he appointed Lamarque as his chief of staff, with the rank of divisional general. When Joachim Murat took over from Joseph Bonaparte, Lamarque was sent to consolidate his position by retaking Capri from British forces under Hudson Lowe. Lamarque led an attack which took the British by surprise. After a hard-fought battle he succeeded in taking the island, and agreed to transport Lowe and his remaining troops to Sicily.

Lamarque was then made chief of staff by Murat and awarded the Royal Order of the Two-Sicilies. In 1809, he was sent to the Kingdom of Italy to lead one of six armies under the command of Napoleon's adopted son Eugène de Beauharnais. He fought at the Battle of Piave River (8 May), at the capture of Ljubliana (22 May) and at the Battle of Wagram (8 July), during which he had four horses shot from under him. Afterwards, he was appointed Chief of Staff of the Army of Italy, and commanded a reserve division of the National Guard near Antwerp.

In 1810, Lamarque was created a Baron of the Empire. Thereafter he was transferred to Spain to support Joseph Bonaparte who had been made King of Spain by his brother, but who was slowly forced to retreat by British, Portuguese and Spanish troops under Lord Wellington.

When Napoleon was exiled to Elba in 1814, Lamarque remained loyal to him, returning to the emperor's service during the Hundred Days. While Napoleon marched to Belgium to engage the British and Prussian armies, Lamarque commanded a division of ten thousand men against a Royalist uprising in the Vendée under General Canuel. Lamarque defeated the rebellion at the Battle of Rocheservière, but the victory was nullified by Napoleon's own defeat at the Battle of Waterloo. Napoleon was later to praise Lamarque's efforts highly: "Lamarque, whom I sent there at the height of the crisis, performed wonders, and even surpassed my hopes."

== Later life ==
After Waterloo, Napoleon was again exiled from France. Lamarque was proscribed by the restored Bourbons and went into exile, first in Brussels then Amsterdam. In 1818 he was allowed to return, retiring to Saint-Sever and becoming politically active as a leftist. During this period he devoted his fortune to buying land and modern agricultural equipment to transform the soil of Landes in order to "humanise" the landscape and increase productivity. He was a strong advocate of agricultural reform and strategic investment to support the economy. In 1828, he was elected to the Chamber of Deputies, representing the departement of Landes. There, Lamarque was a popular representative of leftist factions opposing the Bourbons and their supporters (Legitimists).

After the July Revolution of 1830, he was given command of military forces in order to suppress Legitimist risings against the new July Monarchy of Louis Philippe. Louis Philippe honored Lamarque with the Grand Cross of the Legion of Honor on 21 August 1830. He continued to support liberal causes, which he promoted in his writings. He was also noted for his strong attacks on Russian attempts to undermine the constitutional freedoms of Poland. After a rebellion broke out in Poland, Lamarque advocated French support for the rebels. In 1831 John Stuart Mill complained that "General Lamarque made another of his vehement exhortations to war". Lamarque's defense of constitutional liberties in Poland and Italy was very popular in France. C. A. Fyffe argued that "a great part of the French nation" felt that Louis-Philippe had betrayed the cause of liberty: "it was the unpardonable offence of Louis Philippe against the honour of France that he allowed Poland and Italy to succumb without drawing his sword against their conquerors."

=== Death and June Rebellion ===
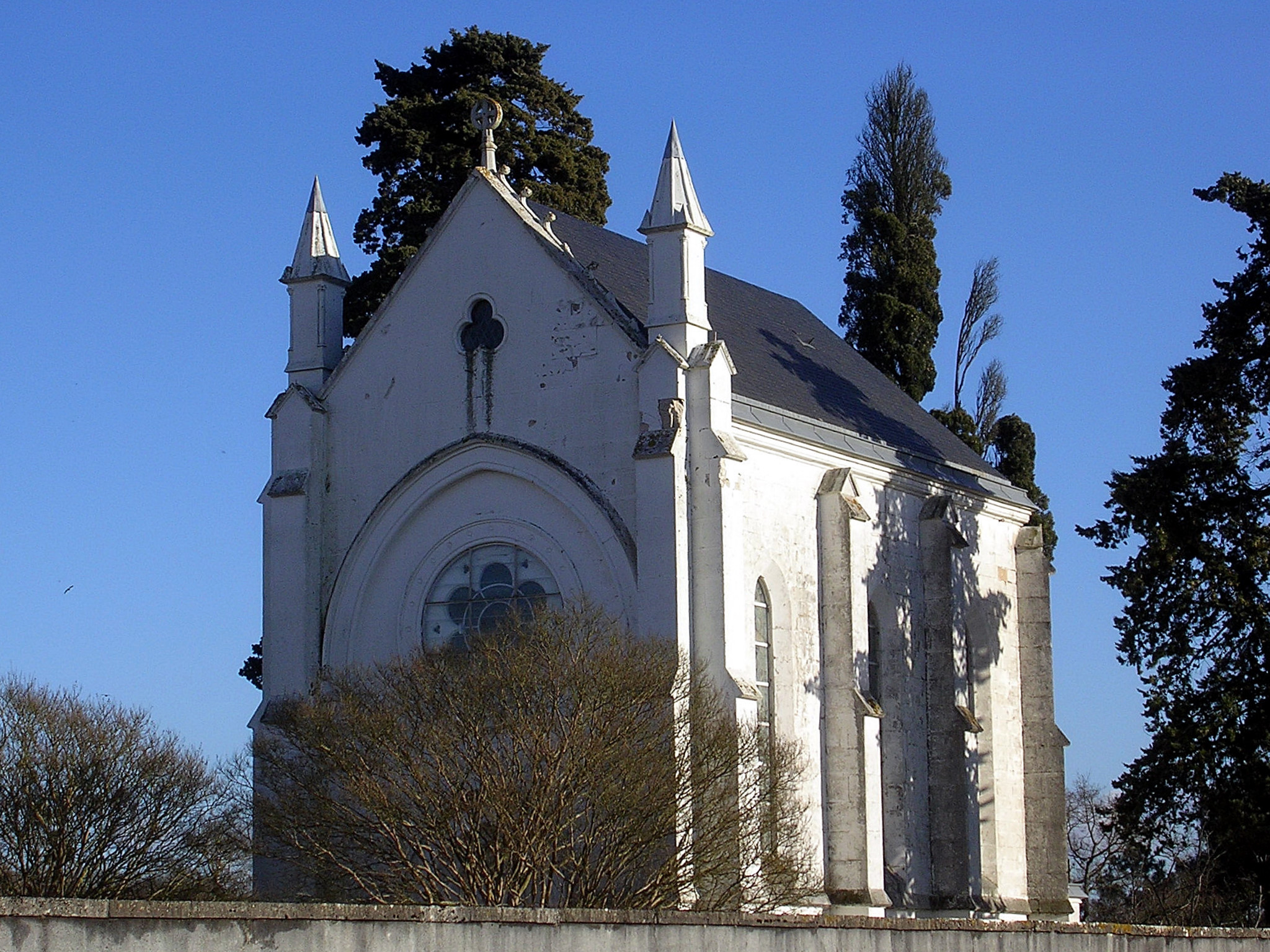
Lamarque's tomb

In 1832 Lamarque contracted cholera, of which there was an epidemic in France at the time. According to historian Mark Traugott, "when the popular Lamarque was struck down by the disease, fear and resentment over the threats to the population's physical and economic well-being had reached a critical stage." He died on 1 June. Due to Lamarque's status as a Republican and Napoleonic war hero, his death precipitated rioting in Paris. On 5 June a large crowd followed his funeral cortege, which first halted at the Place Vendôme in respect to the column commemorating the Grande Armée. As it proceeded along a nearby boulevard there were cries of "down with Louis-Philippe, long live the Republic". A group of students took control of the carriage bearing the coffin. The cortege was diverted to the Place de la Bastille where speeches were made in favour of a Republic. When a member of the crowd rose waving a black-bordered red flag with the words "Liberty or Death" on it, the crowd broke into rebellion and shots were exchanged with government troops. Marquis de Lafayette, who had given a speech in praise of Lamarque, called for calm, but the disorder spread.

The rioting (on 5–6 June) was provoked by both Bonapartists and republicans and led to an attempted insurrection known as the June Rebellion. It was suppressed by the Army and National Guard; an estimated 800 were killed or wounded during the conflict. While the violence broke out following the funeral of Lamarque, historians view Lamarque's death as simply a convenient excuse for the rebels. There were "simmering discontents, especially strong among republicans, who felt that they had spilled their blood on the 1830 barricades, only to have their revolution 'stolen' by a coterie of opportunists who managed to get Louis-Philippe crowned king". The uprising was of brief duration and failed to spread beyond Paris.

=== In Les Misérables ===
Victor Hugo's novel Les Misérables includes a fictional account of the brief uprising which followed General Lamarque's death. In Les Misérables, Hugo views Lamarque as the government's champion of the poor. Hugo says that Lamarque was "loved by the people because he accepted the chances the future offered, loved by the mob because he served the emperor well". Hugo portrays Lamarque as an emblem of French pride and honour:

The treaties of 1815 stirred him up like some personal offence. He hated Wellington with a straightforward hate that pleased the masses; and for seventeen years, scarcely paying any attention to intermediate events, he had magnificently maintained his sadness over Waterloo. In his death throes, at his final hour, he had hugged to his breast a sword that the officers of the Hundred Days had presented to him. Napoleon died uttering the word armée, Lamarque uttering the word patrie – homeland.

The insurrection is a failure in the novel, as it was in history, but is romanticized in the novel and its various adaptations for film, radio, and stage.

== Writings ==
During his first exile in Belgium and Holland, Lamarque devoted himself to literature by translating into French verse the poems of Ossian by James Macpherson. In the preface, he describes the culture of the ancient Caledonians and analyses the Ossianic poems in the light of Romantic ideas, drawing comparisons with Virgil, Tasso, Milton and Homer. He also published a Defence of General Maximillian Lamarque, justifying his actions.

During his promotion of agricultural reform, Lamarque published a mémoire sur Les avantages d'un canal de navigation parallèle à l'Adour (1825) in which he emphasised the need for strategic investment and criticised short-term profit seeking. Lamarque believed that a canal in the country linking the Garonne and l'Adour would bring long-term economic benefits.

Lamarque also published accounts of his military career and political ideas. He wrote a substantial reply to Simon Canuel's writings on the Vendée rebellion of 1815. Canuel had commanded the Royalist force Lamarque was sent to defeat. His autobiographical Mémoires et souvenirs was edited and published by his family in 1835. His analysis of British military formations, Quelques observations sur l'exercice des troupes Anglaises, was published in Baron Juchereau de Saint Denys' Armée britannique : manoeuvres d'infantrie (1828).

== See also ==
- List of French generals of the Revolutionary and Napoleonic Wars

== Sources ==
- Alfred Cobban, A History of Modern France, 1992.
- Jill Harsin, Barricades: The War of the Streets in Revolutionary Paris, 1830–1848, 2002.
- Vincent J. Esposito and John Elting, A Military History and Atlas of the Napoleonic Wars, 1999.
