= Miserable =

Miserable may refer to:

- "Miserable" (song), a song by Lit
- Mr. Miserable, a fictional character in the children's book Mr. Happy by Roger Hargreaves
- Miserable, a performing name of American singer-songwriter Kristina Esfandiari (born 1988)
- Misérable cake, a type of traditional Belgian cake

== See also ==
- Les Misérables (disambiguation)
- Los miserables (disambiguation)
