= Pompeo Litta Biumi =

19th-century Italian historian, genealogist, military officer, politician, and nobleman

Count Pompeo Litta Biumi
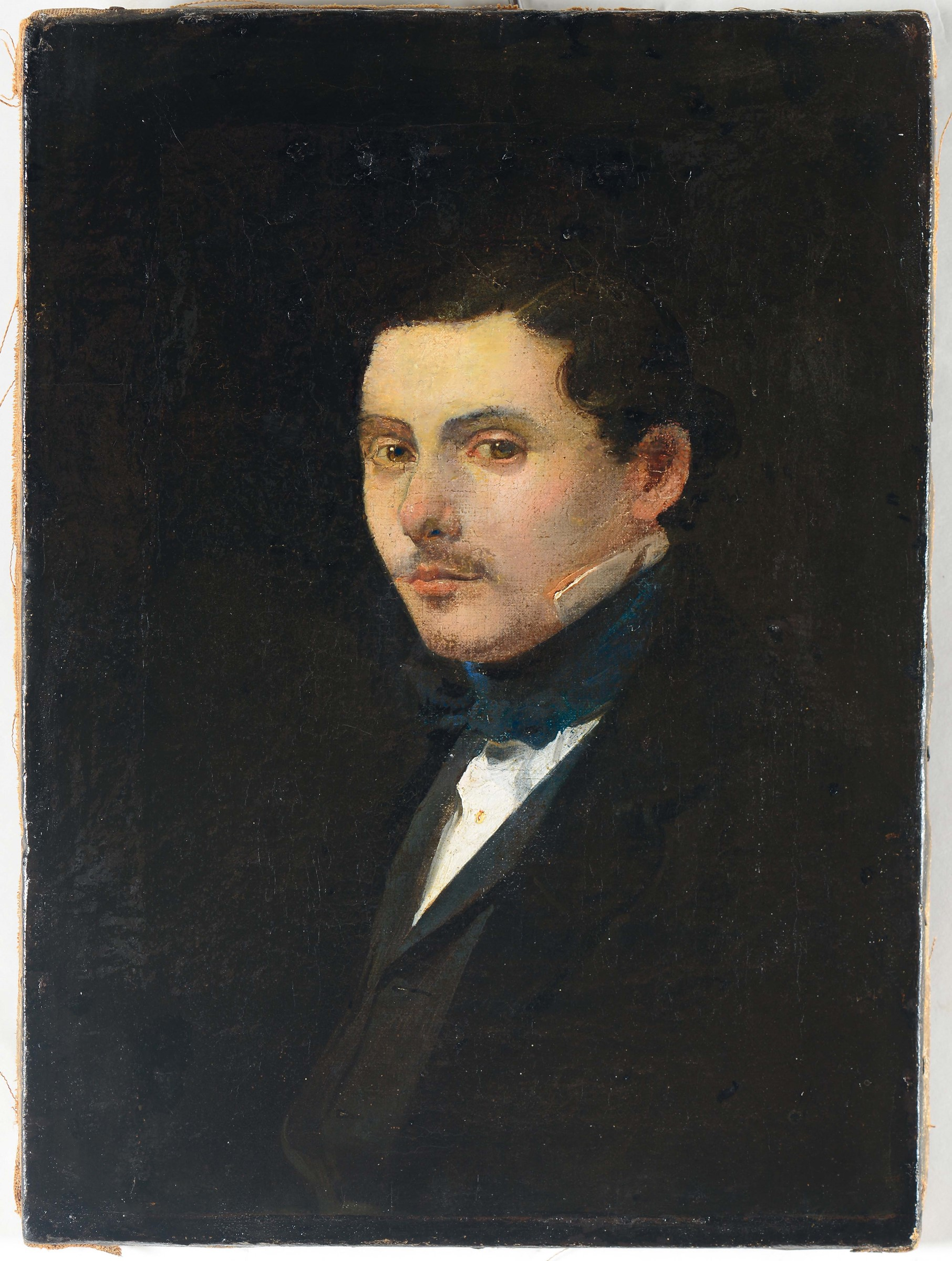
- Self-portrait (1849)
- Born: 24 September 1781; Milan
- Died: 17 August 1852 (aged 70); Milan
- Military career
- Allegiance: Napoleonic Kingdom of Italy
- Branch: Napoleonic Army of the Kingdom of Italy
- Rank: Captain
- Conflicts: Napoleonic Wars; Battle of Ulm; Battle of Austerlitz; Battle of Raab; Battle of Wagram

Count Pompeo Litta Biumi or Pompeo Litta (Milan, 24 September 1781 - Milan, 17 August 1852) was an Italian historian, genealogist, military officer, politician, and nobleman.

== Biography ==
The son of Count Carlo Matteo Litta Biumi and Antonia, daughter of Count Carlo Giuseppe Brentano, Pompeo belonged to one of the many branches into which the Litta family had been divided throughout its history and which only in the eighteenth century had added the surname Biumi due to the marriage of Francesco, Pompeo's grandfather, to Angela Biumi, daughter of the Marquis of Binasco. Litta's maternal grandfather had been general treasurer of the Duchy of Milan at the time of Empress Maria Theresa.

While young, he attended first the college of nobles in Milan and later studied in Como and then moved to Venice and finally to Siena. Having embarked on his diplomatic career, in 1802 he obtained his first official post at the Napoleonic Italian Republic as assistant secretary to the Consulta of State. His career came to an abrupt end, however, in 1804 when he decided to volunteer in the Grande Armée in Italy in the artillery branch, receiving public praise from the president, Francesco Melzi d'Eril, for being the first nobleman to join. For this purpose, he initially took preparatory courses in the military schools of La Fère and Strasbourg before becoming a lieutenant. From 1805 until 1809, he took part in the War of the Fifth Coalition against the Austrian Empire, in particular in the Battle of Ulm, the Battle of Austerlitz, the Battle of Raab, and in Battle of Wagram, after which he obtained a promotion to captain and the Legion of Honour on the field.

Subsequently assigned to Ancona, he was commissioned to organize the artillery corps intended to defend the coasts against the eventual intervention of the British and reported in 1814 in the defense of Ancona with the troops of Marshal Jacques MacDonald. After the dissolution of the Napoleonic army, he stayed for some time in Rome and then returned to Milan where he maintained contact with the fervent liberal environment of the Lombard metropolis, actively collaborating with Il Conciliatore and maintaining friendship and collaboration with Federico Confalonieri and Carlo Cattaneo.

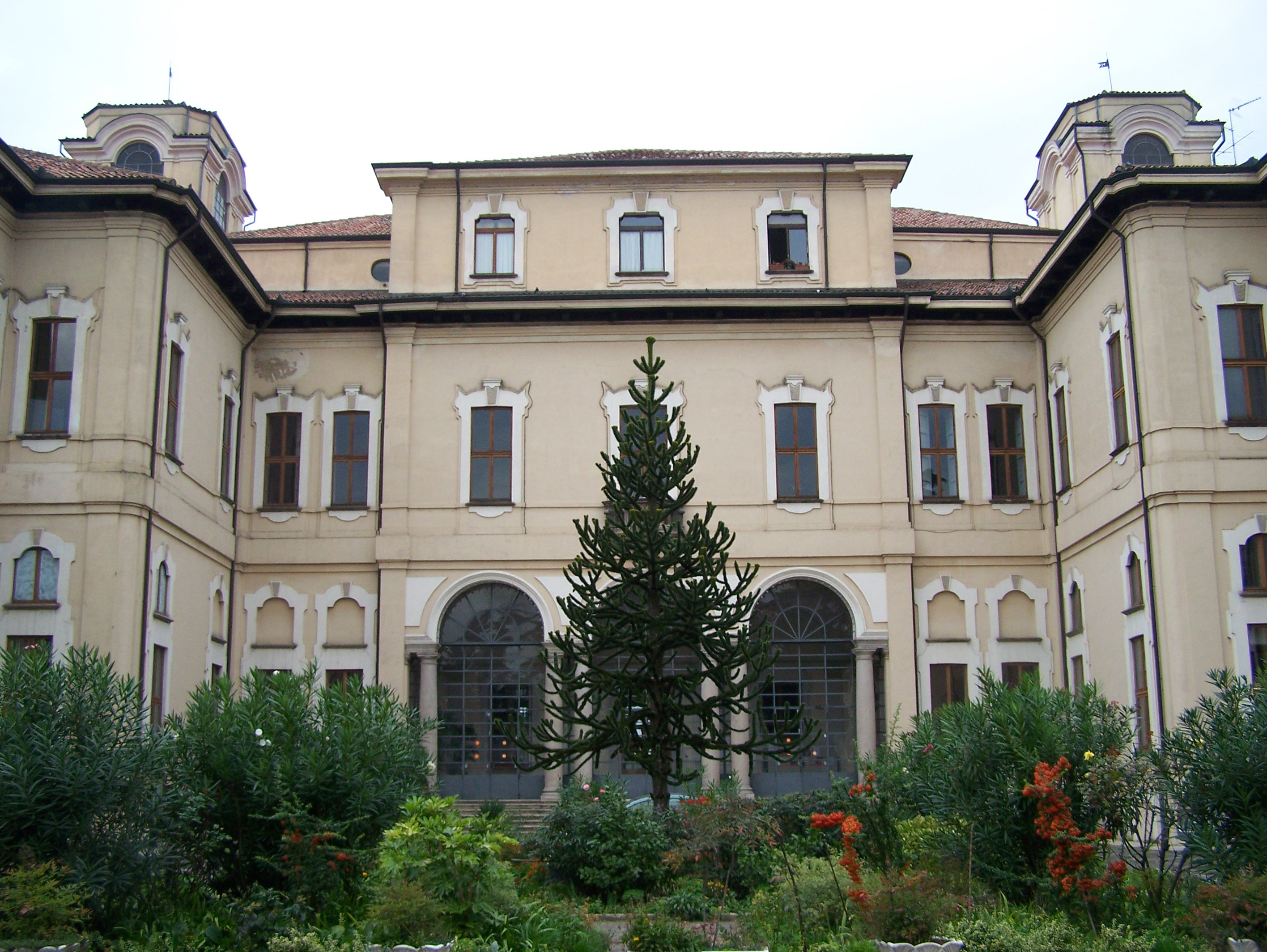
Palazzo Brentano in Corbetta

After the Five Days of Milan in 1848, he was Minister of War in the provisional government of Lombardy. As an inheritance that he received from his grandfather through his mother, Litta became the owner of the Palazzo Brentano in Corbetta which he lived occasionally, especially during the summer.

In 1874, twenty-two years after his death, a monument in memory of Litta was inaugurated in the building of the Brera Academy: the statue, the work of the Milanese sculptor Francesco Barzaghi, was unveiled on 7 August during a memorial to the count.

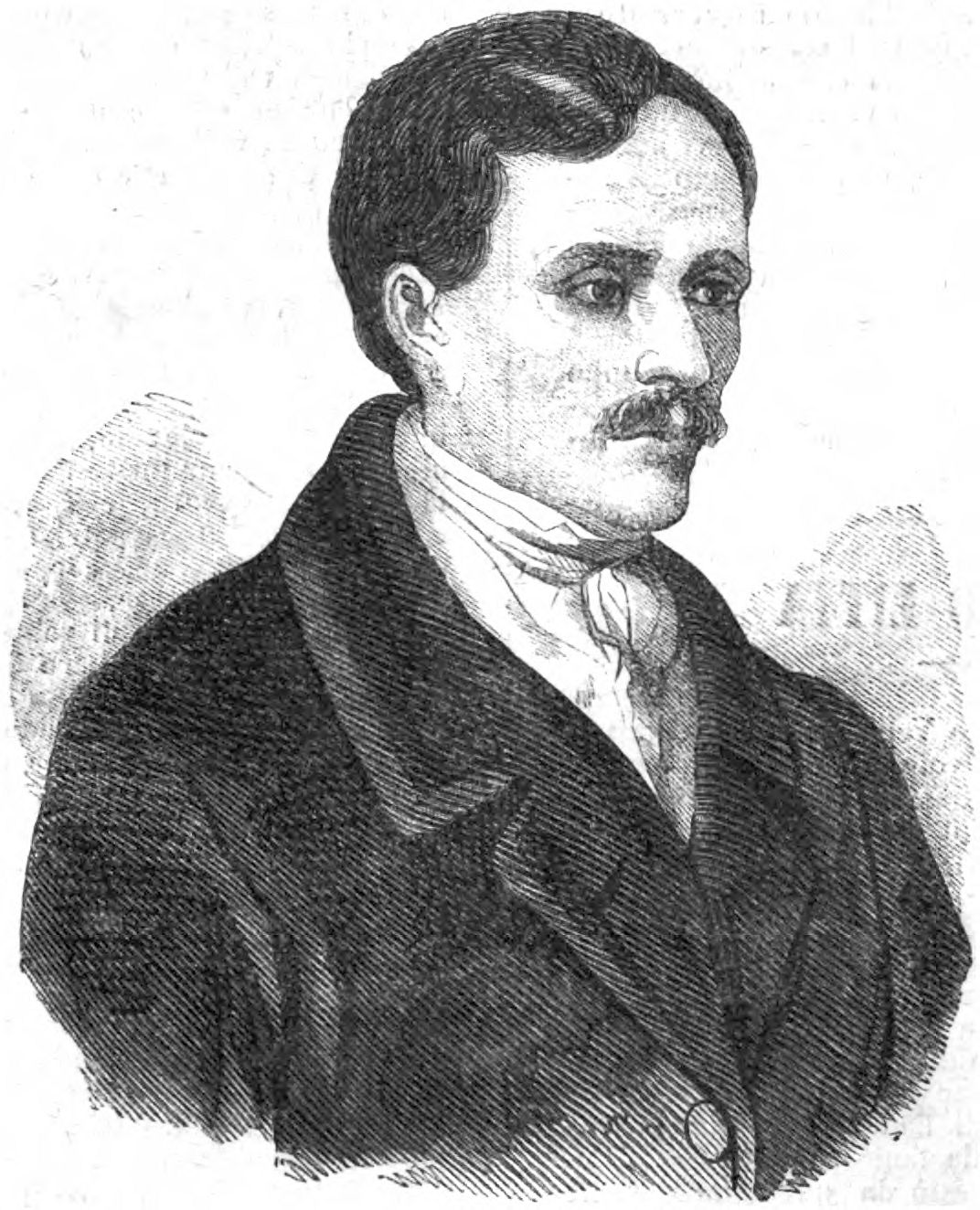
Illustration of Pompeo Litta Biumi from Il fuggilozio.

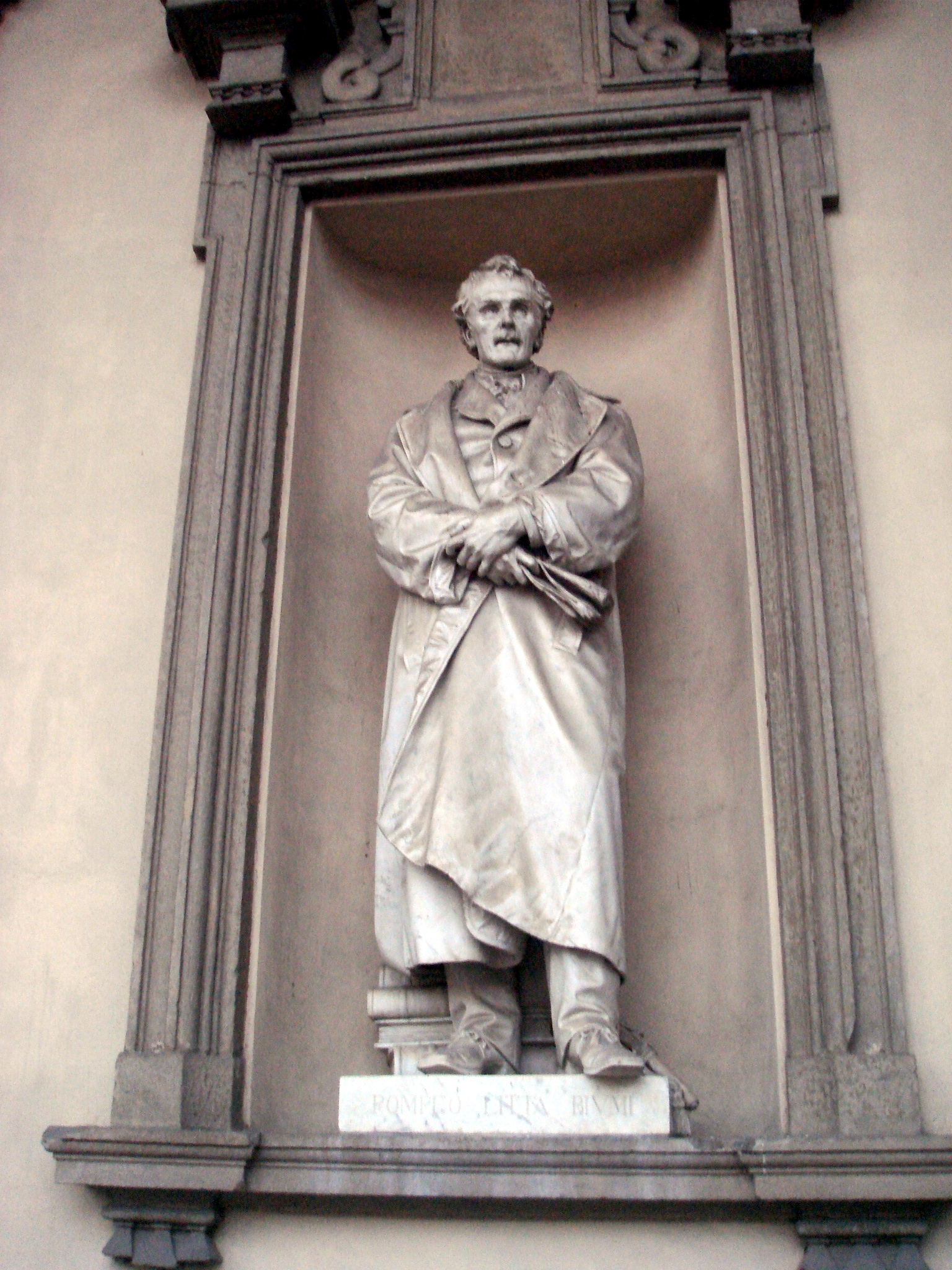
Statue by F. Barzaghi, on the loggia of Brera Academy, Milan

== Famiglie Celebri Italiane ==
The most famous work of Litta Biumi, dictated by his deep interest in history and genealogy, is Famous Italian Families. The work, which began in 1814 after the military campaigns alongside France, enhanced the numerous noble families of the Italian peninsula, particularly those from Milan, of which Litta Biumi himself was a representative.

== Honors ==
Knight of honor and devotion of the Military Sovereign Hospital of the Order of Malta
Knight of the Order of the Legion of Honor (France)
Knight of the Napoleonic Order of the Iron Crown (Napoleonic Kingdom of Italy) - ribbon for ordinary uniform

== See also ==
- Ranks of the Grande Armée

== Sources ==
- Litta, Pompeo (1853). "Autobiografia" [Autobiography]. In Diamilla Müller, Demetrio E (ed.). Biografie, autografe ed inedite di illustri italiani di questo secolo [Biographies, autographs and unpublished works of illustrious Italians of this century] (in Italian). Torino: Cugini Pomba. OCLC 697898360.
- "Pompeo Litta". Il Fuggilozio. Giornale di Amena Lettura Contemporanea. Milano: Borroni e Scotti: 623–4. 27 September 1856. OCLC 956086273.
- Moroni, Andrea (2005). "LITTA BIUMI, Pompeo". Dizionario Biografico degli Italiani (in Italian). Vol. 65: Levis–Lorenzetti. Rome: Istituto dell'Enciclopedia Italiana. ISBN 978-88-12-00032-6.
- Passerini, Luigi (1853). Necrologia di Pompeo Litta [Obituaries of Pompeo Litta] (in Italian). Firenze: M. Cellini. hdl:10111/UIUCOCA:necrologiadipomp00pass. OCLC 794814436.
