= Les Misérables (disambiguation) =

Les Misérables is a novel by Victor Hugo.

Les Misérables may also refer to:

- Les Misérables (musical), a 1980 stage musical
  - Les Misérables (1980 album), the original French concept album containing a studio cast recording of the musical
  - Les Misérables (original London cast recording), a 1985 album containing a recording of the musical made by its 1985 London cast
  - Les Misérables (original Broadway cast recording), a 1987 album containing a recording of the musical made by its 1987 Broadway cast
  - Les Misérables: The Complete Symphonic Recording, a 1988 album
  - Les Misérables: The Dream Cast in Concert, a 1995 concert video of the musical
  - Les Misérables in Concert: The 25th Anniversary, a 2010 concert video of the musical
  - Les Misérables (2012 film), a 2012 film adaptation of the musical by Tom Hooper and starring Hugh Jackman, Russell Crowe, and Anne Hathaway
    - Les Misérables: Highlights from the Motion Picture Soundtrack, a 2012 album
  - Les Misérables: The Staged Concert, a 2019 concert video of the musical

== Film and television ==
=== Adaptations of the novel ===
- Les Misérables (1909 film), an American film by J. Stuart Blackton
- Les Misérables (1913 film), a French film by Albert Capellani
- Les Misérables (1917 film), an American film by Frank Lloyd
- Les Misérables (1925 film), a French film by Henri Fescourt
- Les Misérables (1934 film), a French film by Raymond Bernard
- Les Misérables (1935 film), an American film by Richard Boleslawski
- Les Misérables (1943 film), a Mexican film
- Les Misérables (1944 film), an Egyptian film
- Les Misérables (1948 film), an Italian film by Riccardo Freda
- Les Misérables (1952 film), an American film by Lewis Milestone
- Les Misérables (1958 film), a French film by Jean-Paul Le Chanois and starring Jean Gabin
- Les Misérables (1967 TV series), a TV series in 10 parts
- Les Misérables (1978 film), a British TV film by Glenn Jordan
- Les Misérables (1982 film), a French film by Robert Hossein
- Les Misérables (1998 film), a film by Bille August, starring Liam Neeson and Geoffrey Rush
- Les Misérables (2026 film), a film by Fred Cavayé, starring Vincent Lindon
- Les Misérables (2000 miniseries), a 2000 television miniseries by Josée Dayan and starring Gérard Depardieu and John Malkovich
- Les Misérables: Shōjo Cosette, a 2007 Japanese anime television series
- Les Misérables (British TV series), a 2018–2019 British television drama by Andrew Davies

=== Other ===
- Les Misérables (1995 film), a French film by Claude Lelouch
- Les Misérables (2019 film), a French drama film

== Other uses ==
- Les Misérables (radio series), a 1937 radio adaptation by Orson Welles
- Les Misérables, an album by Lucid Fall

== See also ==
- Adaptations of Les Misérables
- Los miserables (disambiguation)
