= Invasion of Capri =

1808 battle of the Napoleonic Wars

- Part of the Napoleonic Wars
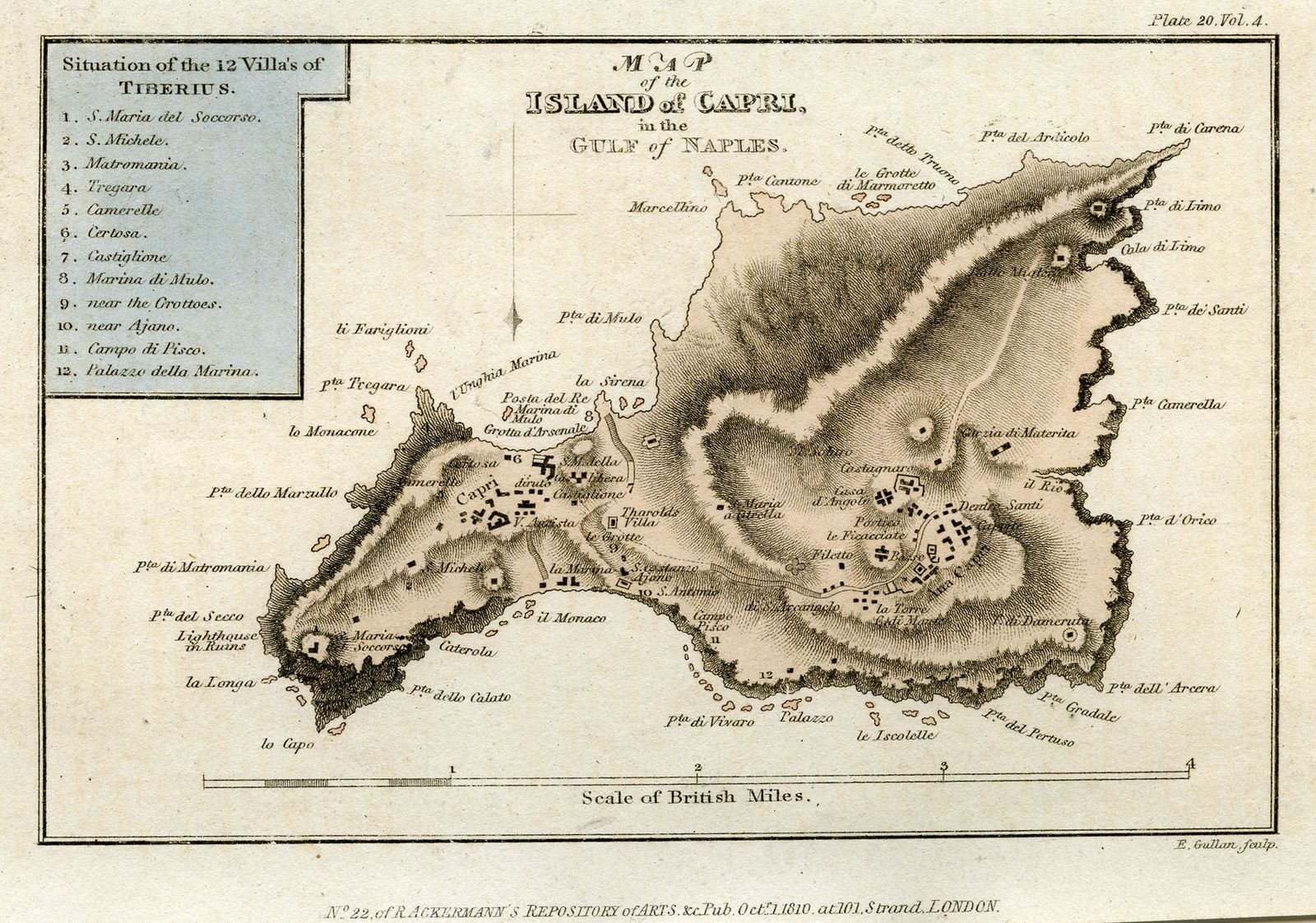
- 1810 map of Capri
Date	4–18 October 1808
Location	Capri
Result	Franco-Neapolitan victory

Belligerents
Kingdom of Naples; France	United Kingdom; Sicily

Commanders and leaders
Jean Maximilien Lamarque	Hudson Lowe

Casualties and losses
Unknown	220 killed or wounded 680 captured

The invasion of Capri was the successful recapture of the Italian island of Capri from Britain by the Kingdom of Naples on 4–18 October 1808.

== Background ==
In January 1806, the French army invaded and occupied the Italian island of Capri from Sicily as part of the War of the Third Coalition. Fourth months later in May, a Royal Navy squadron under Rear-admiral Sidney Smith captured the island during the French invasion of Naples. The British transformed Capri into a fortified naval base akin to Gibraltar, from which they could launch attacks on the French and their allies. In late 1806, the British Army's Royal Corsican Rangers were sent to the island, where they were joined by the Royal Regiment of Malta on September 1808.

By 1808, the French client state of Naples made plans to recapture Capri from the British. On 3 October 1808, the King of Naples, Joachim Murat, ordered Divisional-general Jean Maximilien Lamarque to take charge of the Neapolitan invasion force intended to recapture Capri from the British. The invasion force initially consisted of 1,974 men, but swelled to 2,363 after receiving reinforcements. Opposing them was the British garrison on Capri, which consisted of 1,600 regulars under Colonel Hudson Lowe and was augmented by 200 Sicilian irregulars. The 32-gun British frigate HMS Ambuscade was stationed off the island.

== Invasion ==
On 4 October, Lamarque's invasion force set sail for Capri, transported by 180 troopships and escorted by a Neapolitan squadron under Captain Giovanni Bausan consisting of the frigate Cerere, one corvette and 33 gunboats. 100 troops departed from Salerno, another 200 from Pozzuoli, 200 from Castellammare di Stabia and the remaining 1,863 from the city of Naples. Upon arriving at Capri, the invasion force engaged in a diversionary attack on the ports of Marina Grande and Marina Piccola, which diverted the British garrison's attention from the island's western coast. 480 troops attacked Marina Grande, while 540 troops assaulted Marina Piccola.

Upon witnessing the invasion, Ambuscade left to gather more forces to resist the Neapolitans. Lamarque's remaining troops proceeded to disembark on the western side of Capri. Ambuscade returned with the 28-gun frigate HMS Mercury, though neither ship was able to assist Lowe's troops due to adverse weather hampering their operations. On 15 October, the Neapolitans attacked Anacapri, whose defenders consisted mostly of the Royal Regiment of Malta, and captured the town and much of the regiment after intense fighting. Spreading out across the island, they eventually forced the remaining British troops in Capri, who had cooperated poorly with the Sicilian irregulars, to surrender on 18 October.

== Aftermath ==
Lowe's terms of surrender with Lamarque stipulated that the Neapolitans were to transport all the British officers they had captured to Sicily. The British had suffered total losses of 60 men killed, wounded or missing along with 680 captured, 22 of whom were officers. Many soldiers of the Royal Corsican Rangers deserted during the battle, and the unit suffered 15 men killed and wounded with 20 missing. The Royal Regiment of Malta suffered worse, with 75 men killed, 120 wounded and most of the regiment being taken as prisoners to Castel Nuovo. Approximately 270 soldiers of the unit managed to avoid capture and returned to Malta.

== Order of Battle ==
=== Franco-Neapolitan Forces ===
Note: the term elite companies refers to the Grenadier and Voltigeur companies of battalions (flank companies). The names in italics refers to the nation of which these units came from, they were not used in their respective titles however.

- Franco-Neapolitan Forces, commanded de jure Maréchal d’Empire King of Naples, Joachim, 1st Prince Murat, de facto General de Division Jean Maximilien Lamarque
  - Generals de Brigade Pignatelli, Strongoli, and Cataneo were present, unknown what capacity
  - 1st Neapolitan Line Infantry Regiment (3 x battalions)
  - 2nd Neapolitan Line Infantry Regiment (3 x battalions)
  - 3rd Italian Line Infantry Regiment (2 x battalions)
  - 1 x Battalion, French Corsican Legion
  - Elite Companies, 23rd French Line Infantry Regiment
  - Elite Companies, 52nd French Line Infantry Regiment
  - Elite Companies, 62nd French Line Infantry Regiment
  - 1 x Company, Isenburg Infantry Regiment (Note: Infantry Regiment provided by the Principality of Isenburg, itself part of the Confederation of the Rhine.)
  - Marines of the Neapolitan Royal Guard
  - 1 x Company, Neapolitan Sappers Battalion
- Franco-Neapolitan Naval Force, commanded by Capitaine de Frégate
  - Neapolitan 40-gun Frigate, Cerere
  - French Pallas-class 40-gun corvette Renommée
  - 26 x gunboats (with 24-pounder siege guns)
  - 1 x Mortar Gunboat
  - 180 x transport craft of all types
  - 16 x other boats (earmarked for the marinas)

=== British Garrison ===
The British Garrison on Capri numbered around 1,500 men by the time of the invasion. Under the terms of surrender, the garrison was to be evacuated to Sicily with colours and all honours of war.

- British Garrison on Capri, commanded by Brigadier General Hudson Lowe
  - Royal Regiment of Malta (9 x companies, 44 NCOs and 620 men)
  - Royal Corsican Rangers (10 x companies, 44 NCOs and 640 men)
  - 200 x Sicilian Irregulars
  - 21 x guns (7, 32, 36, and 37-pounders, remainder carronades, older cannons, and 4-pounder light guns)
- Royal Navy Forces in the area (see background above)
  - 44-gun Amazon-class fifth-rate frigate, HMS Ambuscade
  - 28-gun Enterprise-class sixth-rate frigate, HMS Mercury – arriving on the 8th

== Footnotes ==
Notes

Citations
