= 1st Regiment of the Line (King's Own) =

1o Reggimento della Linea "Del Re" 1st Regiment of the Line (King's Own)
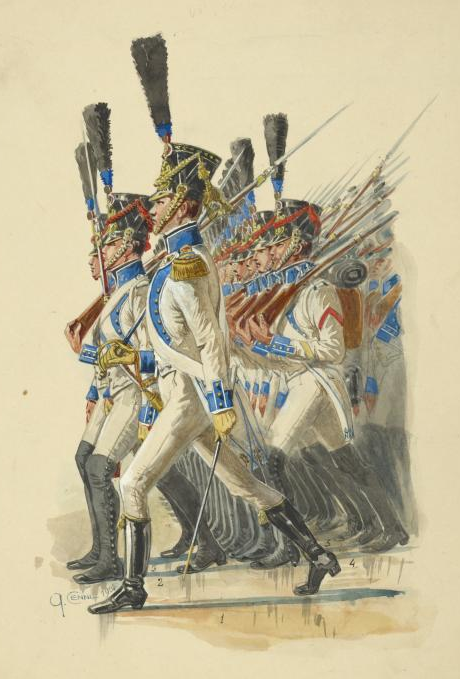
- The 1st Infantry Regiment in 1808 uniforms, presented in line formation
- Active: 1806–1811; 1811–1815
- Country: Kingdom of Naples
- Branch: (Kingdom of Naples) Royal Army of Naples
- Type: Line infantry
- Size: Largest at 4 Battalions
- Depot: Barletta, Apulia
- Engagements: Napoleonic Wars; Peninsular War; Adriatic Campaign; Neapolitan War

Insignia
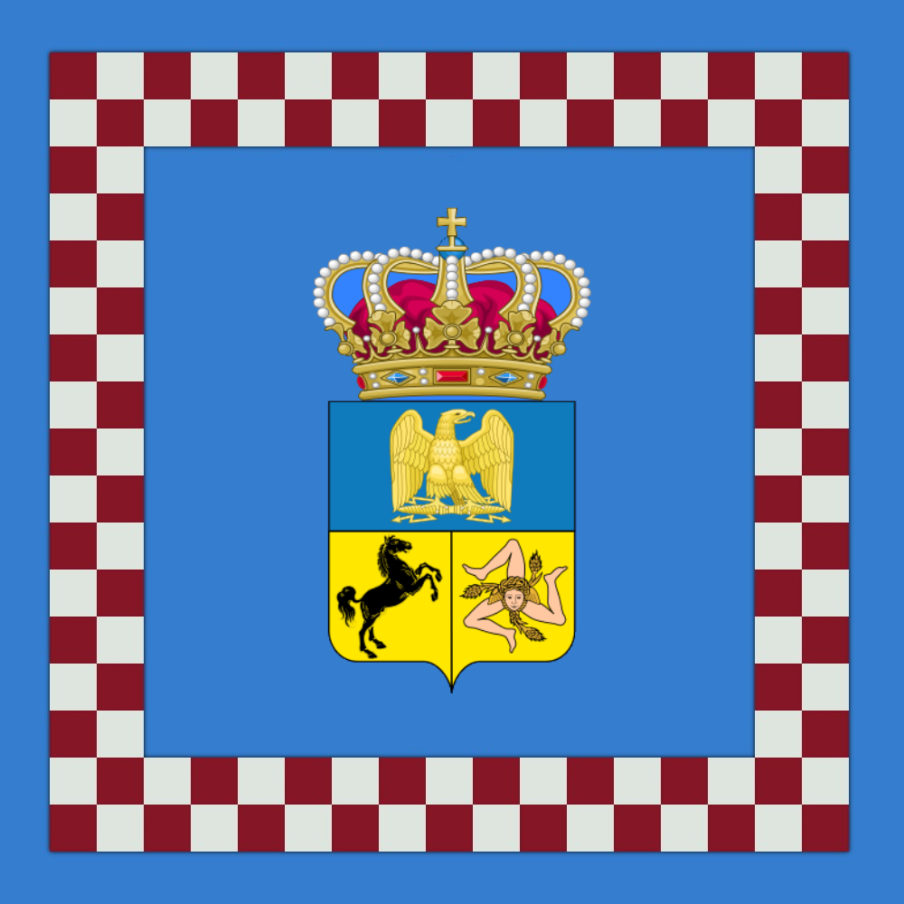
- King's Colours

The 1st Regiment of the Line (King's Own) or (Italian: 1° Reggimento della Linea 'del Re') was a line infantry regiment of the Royal Army of Naples. The regiment was the first infantry regiment formed by the small kingdom, but by 1811 gained a reputation as an exemplary infantry regiment, and was reformed with the honorary title of "King's Own, or del Re". After the disastrous Neapolitan War, the regiment was disbanded, having never seen action outside of the Napoleonic Wars.

== First Formation (1806) ==
=== Formation ===
By decree of 13 June 1806, the 1st Regiment of the Line was formed with Colonel Bigarrè, a Frenchman, as commander together with Major Pegot, another Frenchman, and two Neapolitans as Chef de Bataillons. By August the regiment had grown to 70 officers, but only commanded 496 NCOs and men, taken largely from the Bourbonic prisoners, highlighting the difficulties in recruiting the ranks and file.

On King Joseph's birthday, 19 March 1807, the regiment paraded with 1,800 men and afterwards marched north to reinforce the French Army of Italy. Along the way, many men deserted as the regiment marched north to join the Mantua Garrison. Upon arriving in Mantua, the regiment was reorganised, taking in many elements from the 2nd, losing its quality by the addition of these pardoned convicts or guerrillas forced to service. In November 1807, the regiment left for Spain, reorganised into two war battalions.

=== Peninsular War ===
==== Breakout from Barcelona ====
In January 1808 the regiment arrived in Spain as part of Lechi's Italian Division which consisted of the Battalion of Vélite Grenadiers (Italians), 5th Infantry Regiment (Italian), 1st Neapolitan Line Infantry, and 2nd Neapolitan Mounted Cacciatori. When the French Army of Spain under Napoléon arrived in Madrid, Spain "erupted in rebellion", especially after news of the Third of May revolt. On 4 June 1808, the 2nd battalion commanded by Major d'Ambrosio formed part of the Corps of Observation of the Eastern Pyrenees and engaged a small "Somatenes" (Note: Spanish "Home Guards", literally armed citizenry; not trained as militia however.) force near the El Bruch Pass in southern Catalonia, where 60 soldiers were killed and wounded.

After this small action, the French commander of the Barcelona Regional Garrison; Général de Division Guillaume Philibert Duhesme became increasingly frustrated with the constant guerrilla raids, and began marching north from Barcelona to Girona. This, coming after communications with France having been lost. After seeing the first allied troops arriving in the area of Mataro, the Spanish local guard completely disintegrated and allied troops sacked the town for 24 hours. Though a small action, this battle proved that the Neapolitans were just as bad as the French, in Spanish eyes. This small action became known as the Battle of Mataro.

On 17 June 1808, the regiment was again involved in an action at Mataro as part of the 2nd Brigade of the, albeit now expanded, Corps of Observation of the Eastern Pyrenees. As Duhesme moved north, the fortified medieval town of Girona was one of the last towns to take in this minor campaign. As the allied force arrived, it attempted to storm the town on three or four occasions, of which all failed and the corps retreated back to Barcelona.

Sometime before July, a company was detached to the Montgat castle and tasked with defending the road between Barcelona and Montgat; about 10 km from Barcelona itself. In June 1808, Spain switched allegiance and became an ally of Britain, and Lord Cochrane, a local British naval officer was subsequently given orders by Vice Admiral Lord Collingwood, Commander of the Mediterranean fleet, to assist Spanish efforts to drive the French garrison out of Barcelona. Cochrane then proceeded to disrupt the French supply lines sending landing parties ashore to attack the main coastal road between Barcelona and Blanes and assisted Catalan militia in the capture of a castle at Montgat. On 31 July, the combined Anglo–Spanish arrived in force and laid siege to the small garrison. The garrison, knowing that the miquelets would murder them, surrendered to Lord Cochrane and the entire garrison was taken into captivity.

==== Fall of Barcelona ====
After hearing the stunning news of the fall of Montgat, the Corps of Observation of the Eastern Pyrenees was reorganised into the Army of Barcelona (merely a psychological tactic) and reinforced with a provisional French division, which had left from the failed Siege of Zaragoza. After suffering a massive defeat at the hands of local Spanish guerrillas and the British squadron, the Army was forced to abandon Barcelona, and their garrison of Girona.

==== Back in Naples ====
Sometime after the failed siege of Girona, the regiment was recalled to Naples, and a new 3rd battalion was raised and joined French Army of Naples for the upcoming Capri Campaign. Ending in a stunning defeat for the British, the regiment again gained their pride which had been lost in Spain. After the end of this small campaign, the 3rd battalion was disbanded, while the 1st and 2nd were moved back into Spain.

== Second Formation (1811) ==
=== Formation ===
By 1811, the regimental strength was almost halved, totalling only 1,958 men and officers. Since the Neapolitan Army had been formed, a conscription "issue" had been given each year, much like an ordnance or yearly army reorganisation. As part of the 1811 conscription, the old 1st Infantry Regiment was disbanded, and subsequently ordered to reform in Pescara under the new title of the 1st Regiment of the Line (King's Own), taking many veterans which began returning from the Iberian Peninsula. This new regiment was also organised very different from the old 1st, with four battalions now, instead of the old two. Meanwhile, the old 1st and 2nd battalions of the 1st Infantry Regiment were made independent, and shortly after helped form the new 8th Regiment of the Line.

Though the Kingdom of Naples turned its back on Napoléon in 1813, neither this regiment, nor any of the other Neapolitan units would see service in the small Italian Campaign of 1813-1814. By 1 February 1814, the Neapolitan Army had been completely reorganised, with new permanent divisions and brigades. As part of these reforms, the 1st was assigned along with the 2nd Light Infantry Regiment to the 1st Brigade of the 1st Division commanded by Generale Pepe and Generale Carasco respectively.

=== Neapolitan War ===
Just before the beginning of the disastrous Neapolitan War, the army was again reorganised into two field armies; King Murat's Army and the Army of the Interior (or Reserve). The 1st Infantry were one of the unlucky units chosen to join the ill-fated Field Army. Though still part of Pepe's Brigade, in Carrascosa's Division, the regiment had now expanded to 2,551 men, though many of these "men" were untrained peasants, former prisoners, guerrillas, or just simply not motivated.

The first battle occurred at Modena on 4 April 1815, with the majority of Generale Filangieri and General Carrasscosa's Divisions being captured or wounded. The regiment then saw defeat after defeat at Occhiobello (7 April 1815), Carpi (10 April 1815), Pesaro (28 April 1815), Scapezzano (1 May 1815), and finally the disastrous Battle of Tolentino. The few men who made it out of these battles retreated to the Fortress of Gaeta, where they were then captured after a long and arduous siege, which ended on 8 August 1815.

Finally, on 8 August 1815, following the fall of Gaeta, the Kingdom of Naples was abolished, and with it went the 1st Infantry Regiment, which struck its regimental colours that same day.

== Structure ==
The structure of the regiment (under the 1813 regulations) presented below.

- Regimental Staff — composed of the senior officers and staff
- Small Regimental Staff — composed of the senior NCOs and regimental band
- Regimental Depot, (Note: Consisted of two garrison companies, and the major regimental staff attached for administrative purposes.) at Barletta
- 1st–4th Battalions (Grenadier, 1st–5th Fusilier, and Chasseur Companies) (Note: Under the 1811 reorganisations brought upon by King Murat, the battalions were reorganised so that there were only 4 Fusilier Companies, but the flank companies remained.)

== Uniform ==
All Neapolitan infantry regiments, with the exception of the 7th (Royal Africans) (until 1811), maintained the same uniform, but with different coloured facings. This consisted of; French-style shako with shield-shaped plate bearing the crowned "JN", red, white and black cockade, later blue white and maroon, and blue pom pom for the regiment. (Note: The "regimental pom pom" was worn as part of the lower "section" of the plume. The colour of the pom pom was the same as the regimental facings.) White tunics, small clothes, belts and shoulder straps, and brass buttons. Facings were shown on the collar, lapels, cuffs in "Dark Blue", French cuff flaps and turnbacks. Black gaiters were worn. Under the 1811 reorganisations by King Murat, the regimental facings changed to a lighter version of "Royal Blue".

Drummers uniforms were as for those of the Vélites; they wore a bearskin, green cords and plume with a red tip, crimson top patch with yellow grenade. Dark blue coat with light crimson collar, lapels, cuffs, French cuff flaps and turnbacks, all but the latter piped white. The coat had yellow buttons and two tasselled buttonholes to the collar, two to each cuff and seven to each lapel. Red epaulettes and sabre knots were worn. Small clothes and belts were white. these were the same for the drummers, but reversed colours.

== Footnotes ==
Notes

Citations
