= Army of the Kingdom of Naples (Napoleonic) =

- Esercito del Regno di Napoli; Ll'Eserceto d''o Regno 'e Napule
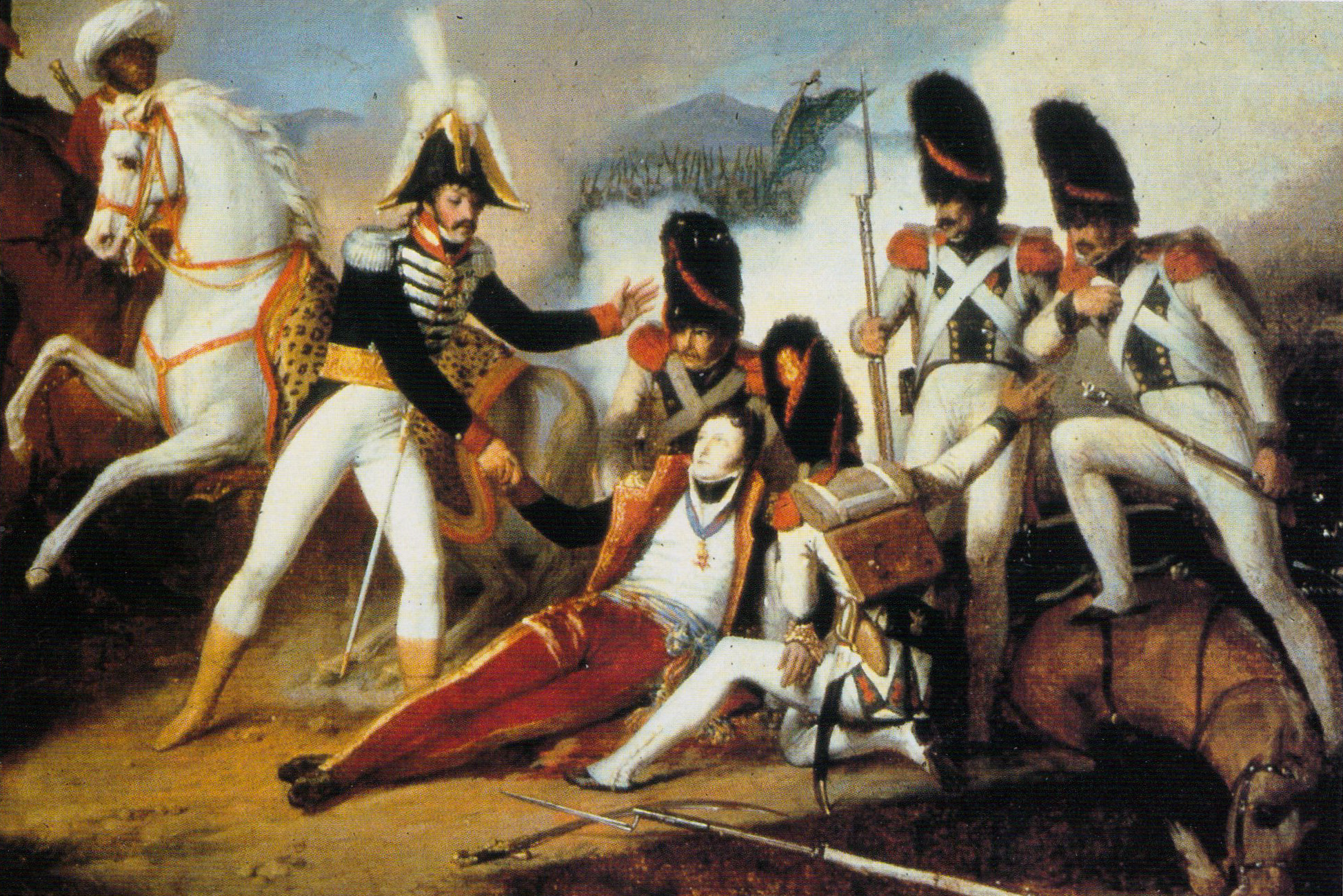
- Joachim Murat helps the wounded general Carlo Filangieri after the Battle of the Panaro
- Active: 1806–1815
- Country: Kingdom of Naples
- Type: Army
- Role: Land warfare
- Size: At least 47,000 by 1815
- Army Headquarters: Naples, Campania, Kingdom of Naples
- Mottos: Onore, e Fedelta Senza Macchia
- Engagements: War of the Fourth Coalition; War of the Fifth Coalition; War of the Sixth Coalition; War of the Seventh Coalition: Neapolitan War

Commanders
- Notable commanders: Joachim Murat; Michele Carrascosa; Guglielmo Pepe; Pietro Colletta; Carlo Filangieri; Charles Antoine Manhès; Francesco Macdonald

The Army of the Kingdom of Naples (Italian: Esercito del Regno di Napoli) (Neapolitan: Ll'Eserceto d''o Regno 'e Napule) was the land force of the Kingdom of Naples. It was in service from 1806 to 1815, reborn from the Army of the Two Sicilies after the French invasion of Naples. It served alongside Napoleon’s Grande Armée in various campaigns of the Napoleonic Wars, until its final demise in the Neapolitan War.

== Origin ==
Following the Battle of Campo Tenese on 9 March 1806, where French forces under General Jean Reynier decisively defeated the Bourbon Neapolitan army the Kingdom of Naples collapsed giving way to a French-ruled client state was established in its place, with the throne being given to Napoleon's brother, Joseph Bonaparte. However, when Joseph transferred to becoming King of Spain, the throne of Naples was granted to Napoleon's brother-in-law, Joachim Murat. The army soon became the single largest source of public employment in the Kingdom, and was the institution that Murat, in particular, looked to create an independent base for his kingdom. However, recruitment for the army was difficult from the start, due to the usual resistance to the unpopular French conscription system which had been introduced. The number of men raised initially was so meagre that convicts and captured brigands were drafted into regiments. Most officers were either captured Bourbon officers or French and Polish officers that stayed in Naples after the 1806 campaign. Neapolitan troops served in various campaigns under Napoleon and his generals, even taking up important roles such as escorting the Emperor back to France on the way back from the Invasion of Russia. However, Murat's alliance-switching spree in 1813 up to 1815 resulted in his army having mixed loyalties and gradually dissolving, finding no interest in serving or fighting for Murat in his campaigns.

== Composition ==
Prior to Murat's arrival, Joseph had begun to shape what would become the Army of Naples. Although only King for little over two years, Napoleon's brother created the foundation for what was meant to be a modern army styled on the French Grande Armée. The young Kingdom's army was split into two "categories"; the Royal Guard, which consisted of the élite of the Army and held honorary post as the King's own bodyguard, and the Line (or regular) regiments. In 1806, the Royal Guard of Naples consisted of a regiment of Grenadiers of the Guard, together with a regiment of Voltigeurs of the Guard and a regiment of Mounted Velites. Together with the Guard there were two regiments of Line Infantry and one Light regiment in 1806 and two regiments of Mounted Chasseurs. Under Murat's rule, three more Line Infantry Regiments and one Light were raised in 1809. The army kept on expanding in size until 1815; at its peak, the Army of Naples consisted of Two Divisions of the Guard, 12 Regiments of Line Infantry, 4 Regiments of Line Cavalry, Four Regiments of Light Infantry, and 40 artillery companies along with many other irregular formations and provincial units.

=== Royal Guard ===
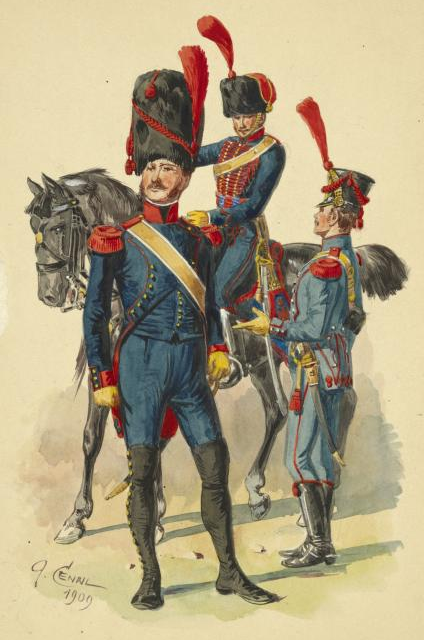
Artillerymen of the Royal Guard in 1812, by Quinto Cenni

The Royal Guard of Naples was split into two separate sections: The Cavalry and Infantry of the Guard. By the 1815 campaign, the Guard was able to muster two entire divisions and a substantially large amount of field artillery.

As was the case with most of the army in 1806, the Guard was overlooked during Joseph's reign. However, with the arrival of Joachim Murat and his coronation as King of Naples, the Guard was expanded greatly to fit the king's flamboyant imagination. By looking at the Guard's many uniforms, Murat's love for gold and finery can clearly be seen.

The Cavalry of the Guard originally consisted of a single regiment of Cavallegieri (Light Horse), of two squadrons, each of two companies. These acted as a light cavalry force, screening the army's advances and scouting ahead of it, usually even foraging for supplies from the country around them to feed the rest of the army. This regiment escorted Napoleon himself during his flight from Russia in December 1812, back to Paris, alongside the Guard Hussar regiment. Additionally, in 1806, there was a squadron of elite Mounted Gendarmes that took duties as military police. In 1808, Murat formed the Corps of Mounted Velites (Veliti a Cavallo) out of the personal bodyguards of several nobles; these too acted as a light cavalry force. Alongside this, Murat formed the Guardia d’Onore (Guard of Honour) out of the two squadrons of Lancers of Berg, which he brought with him from his past post as Grand Duke of Berg. Whether these men blended into Neapolitan society well is still unclear. In 1813 the Veliti a Cavallo were converted to Ussari (Hussars). From late-1813 onwards, regiments of Cuirassiers, Chevaulegers, and Chevaulegers-Lanciers were raised so that the Guard Cavalry could muster a whole division in the 1815 campaign.

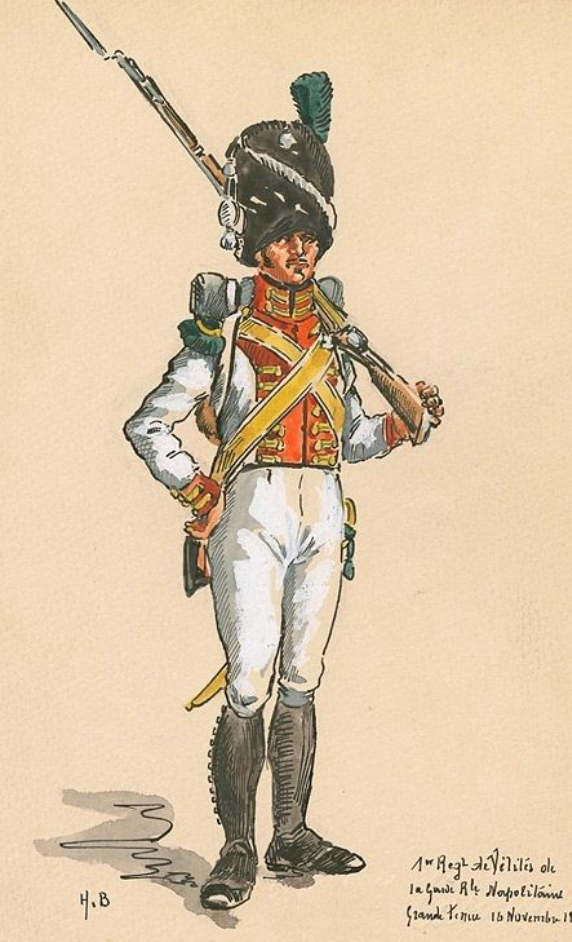
A Velite of the 1st Regiment of Velites showing the yellow and white straps

In 1806 the Infantry of the Guard included a regiment of Grenadiers of the Guard and one of Voltigeurs. The Guard Grenadiers were styled on the French Old Guard, wearing the same type of distinctive bearskin cap, topped with a flaming grenade badge. According to some sources, the Guard Grenadiers had 3 battalions - one of which wore red and white uniforms, and existed solely to guard the Royal Palace of Naples. The other two Grenadier battalions were frequently sent out into the field, serving in Russia 1812 and the War of the Sixth Coalition. The Voltigeurs of the Guard had only 2 battalions, and acted as light infantry. These also served in Russia, and accompanied Murat back to Naples after the disastrous defeat at Leipzig in October 1813. In 1809 the two Guard regiments were joined by two additional regiments of Velites of the Guard, which also served as light infantry, and a one-battalion regiment of Marine Infantry (Battaglione Marinaj della Guardia Reale).

In addition to both divisions of the Guard there were two Guard artillery batteries, one of horse and one of foot. The foot battery had six 8-pounder cannons and two howitzers. The Horse battery had four 4-pounder guns and two howitzers, all of the French Gribeauval design.

=== Infantry ===
The Neapolitan infantry formed the bulk of the Army. The Infantry did not receive the same praise or honours bestowed on them as the Guard did, but nonetheless, their performance in battle was decisive in securing victory. Unlike the Guard, recruitment for the infantry corps was based on conscription, as volunteers were initially scarce and joining the military was unpopular among the lower and middle classes of Neapolitan society. Such was the extent of the resistance to serving in the army that King Joseph decreed the release of brigands and criminals to serve in the line regiments. Unfortunately, these recruits generally proved unworthy of service and frequently deserted.

==== Line Infantry ====
The Line Infantry of the Army of the Kingdom of Naples in 1806 consisted of two regiments, designated the 1st Regiment "del Re" and the 2nd Regiment "della Regina", each of two "war" (or field) battalions of nine companies each and one depot battalion. Battalions had six Fusilier companies, and two elite companies, of Voltigeurs and Grenadiers. However, as opposed to modern Grenadiers, grenadiers during the Napoleonic Wars did not carry grenades, as these proved too cumbersome. Grenadiers were the tallest and strongest men in the regiment, used as shock troops. In 1809 there were seven Line Regiments, now of three field battalions, consisting of one grenadier, one light and four centre companies. By 1812 there were eight regiments, rising to twelve by 1814. The line regiments usually sent out one or two "combat" battalions for military service abroad (e.g., in Spain) and kept the remaining battalion stationed in the Kingdom itself, to train conscripts and continue recruitment to make up for the losses suffered by the regiment's formations serving abroad.

The Army's 7th Regiment of the Line was one of the few military units in Europe during the period which consisted primarily of Black soldiers. It was originally the Black Pioneers, a battalion-sized French army unit raised from Afro-Caribbeans who had emigrated to France from the French West Indies, including Saint-Domingue. When the Kingdom of Naples was established in 1806, the unit was transferred into Neapolitan service on 14 August 1806; in 1810, it was increased to the size of a regiment and designated the 7th Regiment of the Line.

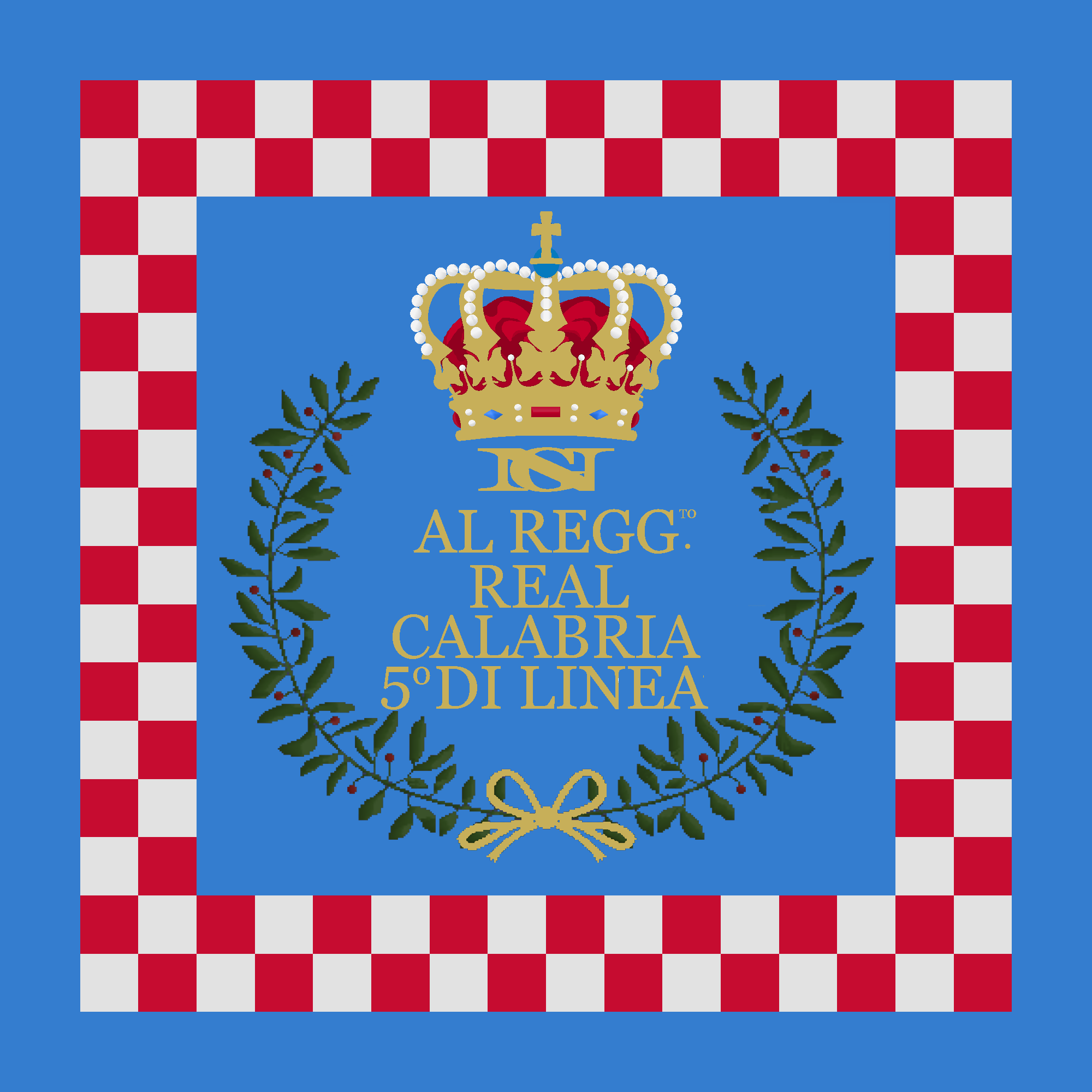
Regimental Colour of the 5th Line Regiment

The official designations of all twelve line regiments were:

- 1st Regiment of the Line (King's Own)
- 2nd Regiment of the Line (Queen's Own)
- 3rd Regiment of the Line (Royal Prince's Own)
- 4th Regiment of the Line (Royal Samnites)
- 5th Regiment of the Line (Royal Calabrians)
- 6th Regiment of the Line (Of Naples)
- 7th Regiment of the Line (Royal Africans)
- 8th Regiment of the Line (Prince Lucien’s Own)
- 9th Regiment of the Line
- 10th Regiment of the Line
- 11th Regiment of the Line
- 12th Regiment of the Line (of the Marches)

The difference between Elite and Centre companies was considerable - the elites held a much higher espirit de corps, believing themselves to be better trained and generally the most senior companies in the regiment. In most cases, this was true.

==== Light Infantry ====
Additionally, there were two light infantry regiments in 1806, later rising to 4 by 1813, consisting of two field battalions. Each field battalion had a carabinieri (carabiniers) company, a voltigeur company, and seven companies of cacciatori (chasseurs). There was also a regiment Real Corso (Royal Corsican), that consisted of Corsican émigrés. It was redesignated as the 1st Light Regiment in 1813, and the old 1st and 2nd became the 2nd and 3rd, a 4th was raised and disbanded in 1813, only being reraised in 1814 with the occupation and incorporation of troops and peoples from the Papal territories.

The 2nd Light Infantry Regiment was formed in 1805 and took part in the campaigns in Germany, Spain, and Russia, and finally in the campaign of 1815 against the Austrians, when Joachim Murat’s Kingdom of Naples was definitively defeated. This regiment, like others of the era, was a unit that provided light troops, deployed in skirmish formation to harass the enemy. The 2nd Light Infantry Regiment is a regiment founded on the values of discipline, organization, and continuous improvement. The regiment is composed of a community of Italian players united by the goal of growing together, improving their skills, and actively contributing to the unit’s development. The regiment’s activities are led by an Italian staff and are based on collaboration, mutual respect, and teamwork, with the goal of creating a serious, active, and competitive environment for all members.

Also the 2o was an honorable regiment led by the Visconte "Cristiano"

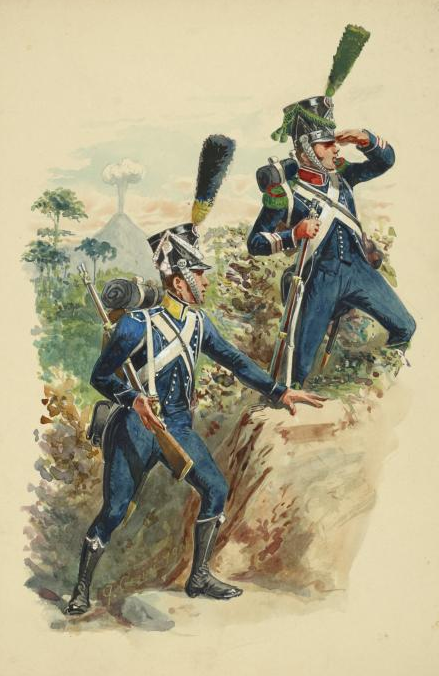
Neapolitan Chasseur and Voltigeur of the 1st Light Regiment in post-1813 uniforms.

=== Cavalry ===
Line cavalry consisted solely of Cacciatori a Cavallo (Mounted Chasseurs) and Cavalleggeri (Chevaulegers) regiments. Originally, there were two Cacciatori a Cavallo regiments, designated the 1st and the 2nd CaC. This was complimented in 1810 by the converted Cavalleggeri regiment. Finally, all regiments were converted to Cavalleggeri in 1813, and a fourth regiment was raised the following year. The adoption of lances and uniform changes were among the major changes introduced. However, the role of the Line Cavalry was always confined to skirmish and patrol duties, as in all Light Cavalry units of the era. Overall, there were no heavy Line Cavalry units. There are several accounts of a line cuirassier regiment being raised in 1809, but was destroyed less than a year later in Spain. The quick destruction of the regiment resulted in minimal attention given to it by future researchers.

The cavalry regiments in the Neapolitan Army were organised into 2-4 squadrons each, each squadron consisting of 2-3 companies. Traditionally, the 1st Squadron usually had the "elite" company within itself, which was the equivalent of infantry grenadiers for cavalry. The elites usually wore bearskins or busbys to show their status, later on some adopted czapkas as they were converted into Cavalleggeri.

=== Artillery ===
Neapolitan artillery was not numerous. In 1806, there was only a single battery of field artillery, equipped with 6-pounder Austrian-pattern guns. By the following year this had grown to a regiment of foot artillery, a battalion of train, a battalion of artificers and armourers, and a battalion of sappers and miners. By 1812 there were 12 foot and two horse batteries. Each horse battery had four cannons and two howitzers each, while field batteries consisted of six cannons and two howitzers.

== Ranks ==
The Neapolitan Army used a variety of ranks. The universal line infantry ranks were used by the Line Infantry, Auxiliary, Artillery and Civic Guard units. The ranks were modelled on their French counterparts, a clear show of French influence.

The various cavalry units of the Neapolitan Army adopted different ranks as to their comrades on foot; however, these too were modelled on the French system. Both Cavalry and Infantry ranks had very similar roles in general.

=== Infantry Ranks ===
In order, highest to lowest, the general infantry ranking system of the Neapolitan Army is as follows:

Neapolitan Line Infantry Rank	Modern U.S. equivalent
Tenente Generale	Lieutenant General
Maresciallo di Campo	Major General
Ajutante di Campo	Aide-de-Camp
Colonnello	Colonel
Maggiore	Major
Capo Battaglione	Battalion Chief
Capitano	Captain
Tenente	First Lieutenant
Sottotenente	Sub Lieutenant
Ajutante-Sottufficiale	Warrant Officer
Sergente-Maggiore	Sergeant Major
Sergente	Sergeant
Caporale-Furiere	Quartermaster Corporal
Caporale	Corporal
Soldato	Private

Naturally, the King was also eligible to command the entire army.

=== Cavalry Ranks ===
The various cavalry units of the Neapolitan Army were given their own ranks. These too were modelled off the French cavalry ranks. Although the ranks of the Neapolitan cavalry were different in name as to their comrades on foot, the roles held by infantry and cavalry rankers were not altogether that different, in practice.

Neapolitan Cavalry Rank	Modern U.S. equivalent
Colonello	Colonel
Maggiore	Major
Capo-Squadrone	Squadron Leader
Capitano	Captain
Tenente	First Lieutenant
Sottotenente	Second Lieutenant
Capo-Maresciallo di Casa	Sergeant Major
Maresciallo di Casa	Sergeant
Brigadiere-Furiere	Quartermaster Corporal
Brigadiere	Corporal
Cavaliere	Trooper

== Campaigns ==
=== Campaign in Spain ===
In February 1808 Napoleon's carefully orchestrated plan to achieve control over Spain and Portugal rolled into motion. After much cunning manipulation of the utterly gullible Spanish royal family, they had agreed to allow tens of thousands of French troops into their kingdom, ostensibly as part of a plot, which they believed they had hatched with Napoleon to invade Portugal and divide it between themselves. Soon it became apparent that these troops not only wanted to conquer Portugal, but to swallow up the entire Iberian Peninsula in the process. Italian and Neapolitan troops made up part of Général de Division Duhesme’s VII Corps stationed in Catalonia, in Général de Division Giuseppe Lechi’s 2nd Division. On 29 February 1808, Lechi's Neapolitans seized the fortress of Barcelona from the Spanish garrison stationed there. All across Spain, similar coups took place, with most vital fortresses secured by the French. However, upon hearing the news of their king being deposed on 2 May, the Spanish populace of Madrid attacked the Frenchmen stationed there, starting the vicious war of attrition and assassination that would last until 1814.

There were two main problems that affected the French and allied troops in Spain: the lack of food and water and the inability to find safe space for any force of troops. Men and officers alike were expected to feed off any food they could find off the land; unlike the relatively peaceful citizens of Central Europe, the Spanish populace fought back on numerous occasions against French and allied foraging parties. Secondly, the relentless flurry of guerrilla activity in virtually all of Spain resulted in even company-sized units being ambushed and massacred on a regular basis. If a garrison was left to hold a post along the lines of communication, it could only survive by immediately constructing a robust defensive position and maintaining a stock of sufficient supplies to feed and arm the defenders. If they dropped their guard, for even a moment, they would be overrun and massacred. Lechi's Neapolitans and Italians were employed in constant counter-guerrilla actions in Catalonia. They took part in Général de Brigade Schwarz’s expedition to Manresa, roughly 40km away from Barcelona. On their way there, they were ambushed and sent in headlong retreat, with heavy losses. A second expedition fared no better, suffering almost 400 casualties. Later in June 1808 the Neapolitans took part in Duhesme's Siege of Girona. Both assaults on the city failed due to the lack of siege artillery in Duhesme's arsenal. Furthermore, the garrison left behind at Barcelona was massacred by the population, leading to guerrillas occupying the city until Marshal Saint-Cyr's corps arrived to retake the Catalan capital. It is reported that Duhesme praised the Neapolitans for good conduct during the operation.

Later that year, Duhesme tried a second assault on Girona. Unluckily for the French, the news of the defeat at Bailen reached them and sent their morale plummeting down. On 6 May 1809, the third and final siege of Girona began, ending in the capture of the city after a relentless assault by Marshal Augereau’s corps. Of the 34,000 men involved on the French side, 15,000 died during the siege. In March 1810 the Neapolitans were employed at the blockade of several Spanish-held fortresses in Catalonia, at Tortosa, Hostalrich, and Sagunto.

In 1811, the 1st and 2nd Neapolitan Line Infantry Regiments and the 1st Light Infantry were in Compère’s division of Suchet’s army in Valencia alongside the 2nd Neapolitan Cacciatori a Cavallo. On 15 December 1811 the Neapolitan infantry regiments in Spain were so reduced in strength that they had to be combined into the "new" Neapolitan 8th Line Infantry regiment. Cadres of officers were sent back to Naples to recruit new battalions for the old regiments. The 8th was given the title "Principe Luciano".

=== Russian and German Campaigns ===
For the French invasion of Russia in 1812, Naples provided Général de Division Francois Destrees's 33rd Division of Marshal Augereau’s XI Corps, consisting of the Marines of the Neapolitan Guard, the Mounted and Foot Velites, the Honour Guard, the 5th, 6th and 7th Line Infantry regiments, and two batteries of artillery; around 10,000 men in total. They formed part of the garrison of the East Prussian port-city of Danzig (now Gdańsk) on the Baltic Sea coast. After the defeat of Napoleon's army in Russia, the Neapolitan cavalry had the honour of escorting Napoleon himself back to France, with heavy casualties due to the weather. The Foot Velites also suffered losses while covering the retreat of the army into Poland. Later in 1813 the Sailors of the Guard and the elite companies of each Neapolitan regiment in Danzig were combined to form the Neapolitan Elite Regiment, brigaded with the 4th Light Infantry (which recently arrived from Naples to Germany), part of the 31st division of the XI Corps. They fought at Lutzen and Bautzen with heavy losses. At the time of the Armistice of Pleiswitz, Napoleon himself decorated Marshal MacDonald (the current acting commander of the Neapolitan troops in Germany) and several officers and men of the Neapolitan brigade with the Legion of Honour. When hostilities resumed, the brigade fought at Leipzig and Hanau. The few survivors were repatriated. Napoleon is said to have said to the troops:

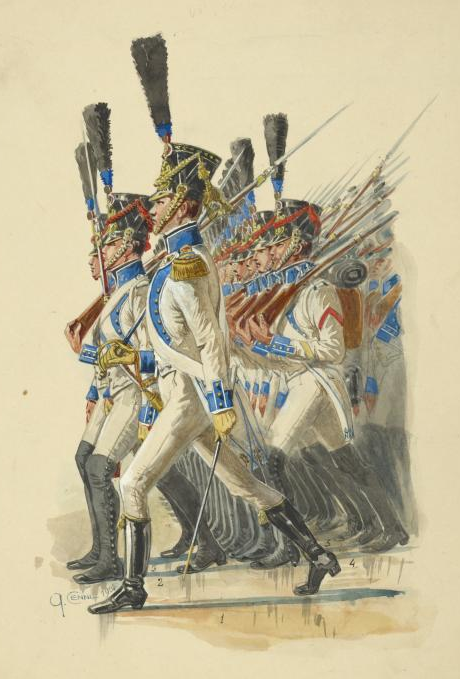
1st Line Infantry Regiment (King's Own) uniforms, showing their distinctive 'Royal Blue' facings. The red cords indicate these are Grenadiers.

"I participated in a prejudice of low esteem of the Neapolitan troops: they amazed me in Lutzen, in Bautzen, in Danzig and in Hanau. The famous Samnites, their ancestors, would not have fought with greater valour. Courage is like love, it needs nourishment."

The line units left in Danzig were faced with the task of holding the city against a much larger Prussian and Russian force under the command of the Duke of Wurttemberg. The city was besieged for almost a year. Under the command of General Rapp, the Neapolitans had to face Frost, Hunger, diseases and relentless enemy bombardment for the entire year. Rapp's offensive strategies resulted in further loss among the troops. When a short truce was agreed on 11 June 1813, the Neapolitan commanders took the opportunity to send praiseworthy reports of the conduct and bravery of their troops to Murat himself. The French general Detres himself sent the sovereign a report showing excellent impressions on the Neapolitan soldiers, a report later published in the "Monitore delle Due Sicilie". Unlike the news from Spain, in fact, the news from the Russian front was promptly published in the Neapolitan press.

Two months after the truce, the Russians launched a series of counter-offensives which gradually tightened the circle around the walls of Gdansk. Russian shells set fires in the primary wooden interior of the city. On 29 December 1813, the city was surrendered unconditionally to the Russians. The Neapolitan survivors were placed into Russian captivity, but news of King Murat's defection to the allies reached their captors, which resulted in their prompt release. The survivors marched back to Naples in perfect order, as to impress the civil and military authorities of the nations they passed through. Joachim Murat rewarded the survivors of the Gdansk siege by transferring them to the Guard.

=== Italian campaign of 1813–1814 ===
King Joachim Murat abandoned Napoleon’s side formally after the Battle of Leipzig and returned to Naples. A deal was struck between him and the coalition allies: Murat would keep his throne in Naples if he provided 30,000 troops to support the allies in Northern Italy. However, he disgracefully dragged his feet in doing so, and was only goaded by his Austrian allies into attacking the Franco-Italians at the River Taro, some 10k west of Parma. The Neapolitans were victorious in this minor clash, and the Franco-Italian withdrew to Piacenza. This marked the end of the fighting in Northern Italy, and news of Napoleon's abdication now arrived. Murat was able to reach an agreement with the coalition allies and retain his throne.

=== Neapolitan War ===
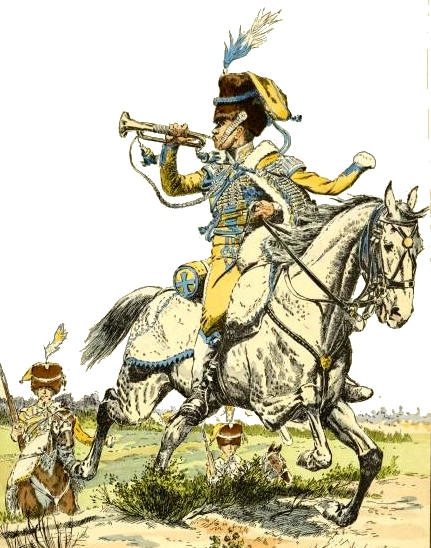
Trumpeter of the Neapolitan Hussars of the Guard.

In 1815, news of Napoleon's arrival in France reached Naples on 4 March. 10 days later, Murat decided to break his alliance with the coalition and once again take the side of his old Emperor, who he had betrayed a year earlier. At the head of 46,829 infantry, 7,224 cavalry, and 78 guns, he marched north to strike against the Austrians. On 4 April, the Neapolitans crossed the Panaro river in upper-central Italy and defeated the Austrians under FML Frederick von Bianchi at Modena. On 7 April Murat tried to force the line of the River Po at Occhiobello, a small town 50k south of Venice, but was met with staunch resistance and was forced to fall back. The Austrians only lost 22 killed in this action, while the Neapolitans suffered far worse. This affected the already brittle morale of Murat's officers and men, who began to melt away slowly. Many soldiers simply found no interest in fighting the Austrians, and deserted. Soon, Murat heard of Britain's declaration of war against him. On 10 April, the Neapolitan garrison of the town of Carpi was attacked and fled. Murat withdrew to Ravenna, near the eastern coast of the Italian peninsula. Continuously harried, the Neapolitans lost to Bianchi's Austrians at Cesenatico and Pesaro. The Neapolitans finally stopped at the small town of Tolentino, and the Austrian army arrived to meet them. Soon, it became clear that the decisive battle would be fought there.

==== Battle of Tolentino ====
Bianchi commanded 12 battalions, 10 squadrons and four batteries of artillery, totalling just under 11,000 men and 28 guns. Murat had 15,000 infantry, 2,000 cavalry and 35 guns. Bianchi knew he was outnumbered and outgunned but decided against a retreat. The town of Tolentino was surrounded by its medieval walls and blocked the valley of the River Chienti, along which valley the road from Macerata to Foligno ran. The terrain around the Chienti is generally hilly, with several ridges dotting the landscape.

Murat sent a division under Carrascosa to slow down Niepperg’s Austrians who could’ve turned Murat's flank. However, Murat soon learned of Carrascosa's defeat at the Battle of Scappezano. At Tolentino, the Neapolitan troops originally made good progress until Murat ordered his advancing columns into 4 giant squares – large, lumbering formations made to protect from cavalry, which was not a serious threat to the Neapolitans. Bianchi seized the opportunity to order an artillery battery to rip through the leading square at close range, and then charged several squadrons of cavalrymen into the gaps left in the square. The entire advance broke and the Neapolitans fled. Being pushed at three sides, Murat's resolve crumbled, and so did his army. They withdrew behind the cover of night, and soon dissolved into a leaderless mob.

The battle's result had drastic results on both sides’ morale. On 20 May, peace negotiations began, and Neapolitan generals Pepe and Carrascosa sued for peace, signing the Treaty of Casalanza. The Austrian armies entered Naples on the 23rd, and restored Ferdinand to the throne of Naples, after almost a decade of exile. Meanwhile, Murat escaped from Naples, disguised as a Danish sailor, and sailed to Cannes, in France. He was soon caught trying to reclaim his kingdom and executed on 13 October 1815. Most Neapolitan fortresses opened their doors immediately after news of Casalanza reached them. However, the tenacious General Begani, commanding the garrison of Gaeta, refused to surrender to the Austrians unless under the express order of Joachim Murat. Yet, under pressure for several days, and besieged by Austrian, British, Papal and Bourbon troops, the Murattian flag was finally lowered on 5 August, and the defenders released under parole. Thus, the last shots of the Napoleonic wars fell upon the shattered walls of Gaeta.

==== Order of battle (1815) ====
The Neapolitan Army of 1815
Division	Commanding officer	Brigade Commanding officer	Units	Headcount
Infantry of the Royal Guard	Pignatelli-Strongoli	Taillade; Merliot	1st Velites; Voltigeurs (light infantry) of the R.G.; 2st Velites; Artillery of the R.G.; Sappers; Train	5.840
Cavalry of the Royal Guard	Livron	Campana; Giuliani	Hussars of the R.G.; Light Horse of the R.G.; Cuirassiers; Lancers; Horse Artillery; Train	2.109
1st Division	Carrascosa	Pepe; De Gennaro	2nd Light Infantry Regiment; 1st Line Infantry Regiment; 3rd Line Infantry Regiment; 5th Line Infantry Regiment; Artillery; Train	9.694
2nd Division	D'Ambrosio	D'Aquino; Medici	3rd Light Infantry Regiment; 2nd Line Infantry Regiment; 6th Line Infantry Regiment; 9th Line Infantry Regiment; Artillery; Train	8.968
3rd Division	Lechi	Majo; Carafa	1st Light Infantry Regiment; 4th Line Infantry Regiment; 7th Line Infantry Regiment; 8th Line Infantry Regiment; Artillery; Train	9.358
4th Division	Pignatelli-Cerchiara	Rosaroll; Roche	4th Light Infantry Regiment; 10th Line Infantry Regiment; 11th Line Infantry Regiment; 12th Line Infantry Regiment; Artillery; Train	8.376
Line Cavalry	Rossetti	Fontaine; Napoletani	1st Cavalry Regiment; 2nd Cavalry Regiment; 3rd Cavalry Regiment; 4th Cavalry Regiment	2.922

== Footnotes ==
Notes

Citations
