= Les Misérables (original London cast recording) =

Les Misérables – Original London Cast Album

Cast recording by the original London cast
- Released: 1985
- Label: First Night

Les Misérables, subtitled Original London Cast Album, is an album containing a recording of the musical Les Misérables made by its 1985 London cast and originally released in the UK in 1985 by First Night Records.

In the United States, it was issued by Relativity Records under license from First Night.

== Background ==
According to the album's notes, it was "recorded and mixed at CTS Studios, Wembley, between October 28th and November 12th 1985."

== Critical reception ==
Professional ratings
Review scores
Source	Rating
AllMusic	5/5 stars

In a contemporary review for AllMusic, Sarah Erlewine notes that "the original London cast recording is considered by many to be superior to various other releases [...], including the Broadway cast." She also notes that the London cast featured Colm Wilkinson and Frances Ruffelle who would later reprise their roles on Broadway.

== Track listing ==
2 × LP – First Night Records – Encore 1

Side 1
No.	Title	Artist(s)	Length
1.	"At the End of the Day"	Ensemble
2.	"I Dreamed a Dream"	Patti LuPone
3.	"Lovely Ladies"	Ensemble
4.	"Who Am I?"	Colm Wilkinson
5.	"Fantine's Death" "Come to Me" "Confrontation"	Patti LuPone and Colm Wilkinson; Roger Allam and Colm Wilkinson

Side 2
No.	Title	Artist(s)	Length
1.	"Castle on a Cloud"	Zoe Hart
2.	"Master of the House"	Alun Armstrong, Sue Jane Tanner and Ensemble
3.	"Stars"	Roger Allam
4.	"Look Down"	Ian Tucker and Ensemble
5.	"Little People"	Ian Tucker
6.	"Red and Black"	David Burt, Michael Ball and Ensemble
7.	"Do You Hear the People Sing?"	David Burt and Ensemble

Side 3
No.	Title	Artist(s)	Length
1.	"Love Montage" "I Saw Him Once" "In My Life"	Rebecca Caine; Rebecca Caine and Colm Wilkinson
2.	"A Heart Full of Love"	Rebecca Caine, Michael Ball and Frances Ruffelle
3.	"One Day More"	Ensemble
4.	"On My Own"	Frances Ruffelle
5.	"The Attack"	David Burt and Ensemble
6.	"A Little Fall of Rain"	Frances Ruffelle and Michael Ball
7.	"Drink with Me"	Clive Carter and Ensemble

Side 4
No.	Title	Artist(s)	Length
1.	"Bring Him Home"	Colm Wilkinson
2.	"Dog Eats Dog"	Alun Armstrong
3.	"Javert's Suicide: Soliloquy"	Roger Allam
4.	"Empty Chairs at Empty Tables"	Michael Ball
5.	"Wedding Chorale"	Ensemble
6.	"Beggars at the Feast"	Alun Armstrong and Sue Jane Tanner
7.	"Finale"	Ensemble

== Charts ==
Chart (1986–1987)	Peak position
UK Albums (Official Charts)	72
Chart (1991)	Peak position
New Zealand Albums (RMNZ)	9
Chart (2013)	Peak position
UK Albums (Official Charts)	54

== Certifications ==
Region	Certification	Certified units/sales
United States (RIAA)	Platinum	1,000,000^{^}
^{^} Shipments figures based on certification alone.
