= Ranks of the French Imperial Army (1804–1815) =

This article lists the military ranks and the rank insignia used in the French Imperial Army. Officers and the most senior non-commissioned rank had rank insignia in the form of epaulettes, sergeants and corporals in the form of stripes or chevrons on the sleeves.

== Commissioned officer ranks ==
Gold (yellow) or silver (white) stripes and epaulettes were used in accordance with the metal of the uniform buttons of the regiment. Officers of regiments with gold buttons used gold epaulettes, those with silver buttons wore silver epaulettes. The epaulettes of majors were of contrary metal; gold buttons, silver epaulets etc. Generals and field officers used bullion fringes. Gold and silver were also often used in accordance to the Regiments designation as a Ligne (line) regiment would frequent gold while a Legere (light) regiment would frequent silver.

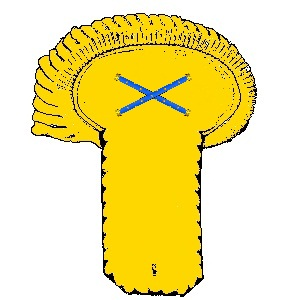
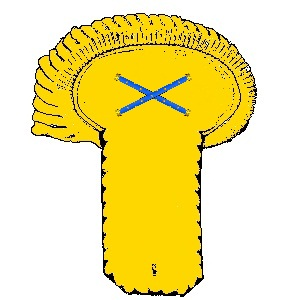
Rank group	General / flag officers
Insignia
	Maréchal d'Empire	Général de division	Général de brigade

Rank group	Senior officers
Insignia
Infantry and artillery	Colonel	Major	Chef de bataillon
Cavalry and train	Colonel	Major	Chef d'escadron

Rank group	Junior officers
Insignia
Insignia (1812)
Infantry, artillery Cavalry and train	Capitaine adjudant major	Capitaine	Lieutenant	Sous-lieutenant

== Other ranks ==
The rank insignia of non-commissioned officers and enlisted personnel.

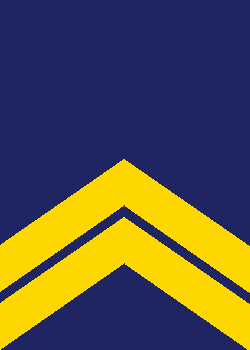
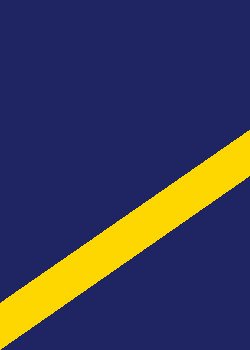
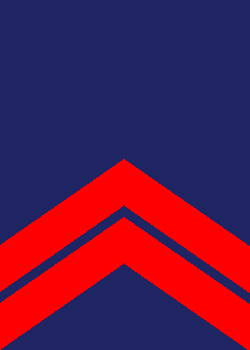
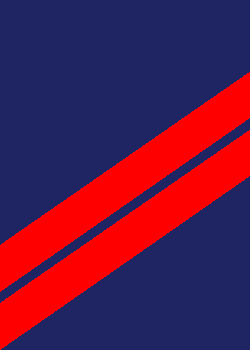
Rank group	NCOs				Senior Enlisted		Junior Enlisted
Insignia							NO INSIGNIA	NO INSIGNIA
Infantry and artillery	Adjudant sous-officier	Adjudant sous-officier version of 1808	Sergent-major	Sergent	Caporal-fourrier	Caporal	Soldat	Recrut/Conscrit
Cavalry and train	Adjudant sous-officier	Adjudant sous-officier version of 1808	Maréchal des logis-chef	Maréchal des logis	Brigadier-fourrier	Brigadier	Cavalier	Recrut/Conscrit

== Physicians, surgeons, and pharmacists ==
Physician	Surgeons	Pharmacists
Médecin en chef	Chirurgien en chef	Pharmacien en chef
Médecin major	Chirurgien major	Pharmacien major
Médecin aide major	Chirurgien aide major	Pharmacien aide major
Médecin sous aide major	Chirurgien sous aide major	Pharmacien sous aide major

== Good conduct badges ==
Sergeants, corporals and privates were issued good conduct and long service badges, galons d'ancienneté in the form of chevron on the upper left arm of the uniform coat; one chevron for ten years' service, two for 15 years' service, three for 20 years' service. The chevrons were officially of red cloth for all ranks, except caporal-fourriers who were issued chevrons in yellow or white cloth (depending on the metal colour), as a replacement for the stripe that denoted his rank. In reality, however, the sergeants used chevrons in yellow or white.

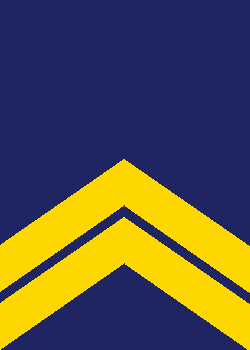
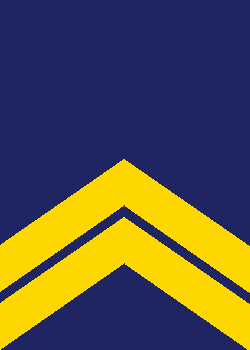
Sergent-major with 15 years' service

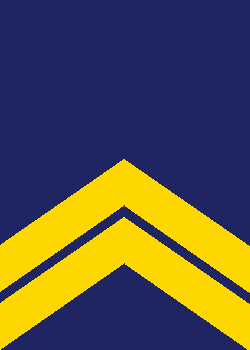
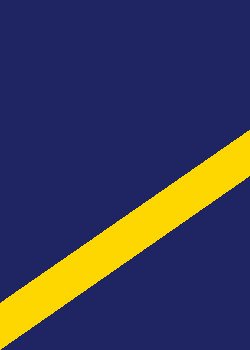
Sergent with 15 years' service

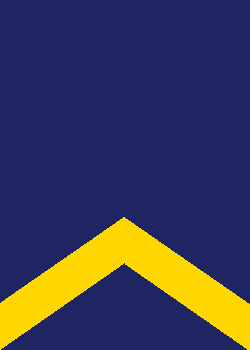
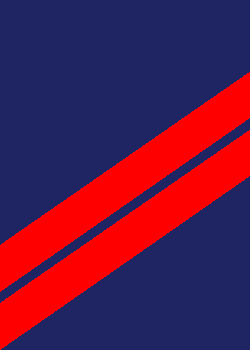
Caporal-fourrier with ten years' service

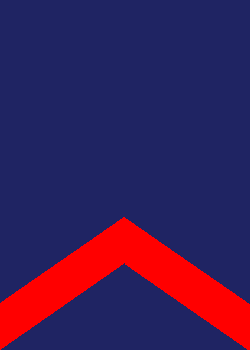
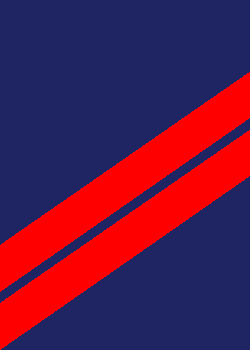
Caporal with ten years' service

== See also ==
- Uniforms of La Grande Armée
- Ranks in the French Army
- French Army
