= Les Misérables (original Broadway cast recording) =

Les Misérables – Broadway Album

Cast recording by the original Broadway cast
- Released: 1987
- Label: Geffen

Les Misérables, subtitled Broadway Album or Original Broadway Cast Recording, is an album containing a recording of the musical Les Misérables made by its 1987 Broadway cast. The album was released by Geffen Records in the same year.

== Critical reception ==
Professional ratings
Review scores
| Source | Rating |
|---|---|
| AllMusic | 3/5 stars |

Professional ratings
Highlights from Les Misérables
Review scores
| Source | Rating |
|---|---|
| AllMusic | 4/5 stars |

In a contemporary review for AllMusic, Sarah Erlewine writes: "The original Broadway cast recording contains some very fine performances, particularly by Colm Wilkinson (as Valjean) and Frances Ruffelle (as Eponine, the waif). The vocals on this recording are heavy on character, making it an interesting and entertaining listen."

== Chart performance ==
The album spent nine weeks on the Billboard Top Pop Albums chart, peaking at number 117. Later, it spent dozens of weeks on Billboard's Top Pop Catalog Albums chart.

== Track listing ==
2 × LP – Geffen GHS 24151

Side 1
| No. | Title | Length |
|---|---|---|
| 1. | "At the End of the Day" | 4:46 |
| 2. | "I Dreamed a Dream" | 4:13 |
| 3. | "Lovely Ladies" | 3:50 |
| 4. | "Who Am I?" | 2:50 |
| 5. | "Come to Me (Fantine's Death)" | 3:45 |
| 6. | "Confrontation" | 2:32 |

Side 2
| No. | Title | Length |
|---|---|---|
| 1. | "Castle on a Cloud" | 1:45 |
| 2. | "Master of the House" | 4:54 |
| 3. | "The Thénardier Waltz of Treachery" | 3:00 |
| 4. | "Look Down" | 2:55 |
| 5. | "Stars" | 2:56 |
| 6. | "Red and Black" | 4:32 |
| 7. | "Do You Hear the People Sing?" | 2:07 |

Side 3
| No. | Title | Length |
|---|---|---|
| 1. | "In My Life" | 5:15 |
| 2. | "A Heart Full of Love" | 2:21 |
| 3. | "Plumet Attack" | 1:58 |
| 4. | "One Day More" | 3:29 |
| 5. | "On My Own" | 4:13 |
| 6. | "Javert at the Barricade" / "Little People" | 2:23 |
| 7. | "The First Attack" | 0:39 |
| 8. | "A Little Fall of Rain" | 3:23 |

Side 4
| No. | Title | Length |
|---|---|---|
| 1. | "Drink with Me" | 2:39 |
| 2. | "Bring Him Home" | 3:16 |
| 3. | "Dog Eats Dog" | 2:17 |
| 4. | "Javert's Suicide" | 3:30 |
| 5. | "Turning" | 2:03 |
| 6. | "Empty Chairs at Empty Tables" | 3:00 |
| 7. | "Wedding Chorale" / "Beggars at the Feast" | 2:14 |
| 8. | "Finale" | 4:55 |

== Charts ==
| Chart (1987) | Peak position |
|---|---|
| US Billboard Top Pop Albums | 117 |
| Chart (1989) | Peak position |
| Australian Albums (ARIA) | 42 |
| Chart (1991) | Peak position |
| Australian Albums (ARIA) | 43 |
| Chart (1998) | Peak position |
| Belgian Albums (Ultratop Flanders) | 3 |
| Chart (1999) | Peak position |
| New Zealand Albums (RMNZ) | 20 |

== Certifications ==
| Region | Certification | Certified units/sales |
|---|---|---|
| United States (RIAA) | 4× Platinum | 4,000,000^{^} |
^{^} Shipments figures based on certification alone.

== Awards ==
| Year | Award type | Categories | Results | Ref. |
|---|---|---|---|---|
| 1988 | Grammy Awards | Best Musical Cast Show Album | Won | |
