= Los miserables =

Los miserables or Los Miserables may refer to:

- Los miserables (1943 film)
- Los miserables (1973 TV series)
- Los miserables (2014 TV series)
- Los Miserables (band), a Chilean punk rock band
