= Battles inscribed on the Arc de Triomphe =

The following is a list of the 158 battles inscribed on the Arc de Triomphe in Paris, which were fought by the French First Republic and the First French Empire between 1792 and 1815:

- The names of 96 battles are engraved on the inner façades, under the great arches (24 on each of the four pillars).
- The names of 32 battles are engraved on the inner façades, under the small arches (8 on each of the four pillars).
- The names of 30 battles are engraved on the attic (11 on each of the long façades and 4 on each of the short ones).

Additionally, some of these battles are represented in low relief on the inner and outer façades of the monument:

- On the inner façades, under the small arches, four low reliefs list the names of 16 battles (6 on the low relief of the northern pillar, 4 on the low reliefs of the eastern and southern pillars, 2 on the low relief of the western pillar).
- On the outer façades, five battles are represented in low relief (2 on the northern façade facing the Avenue de la Grande Armée, 1 on each of the other façades).

Related list: Names inscribed on the Arc de Triomphe.

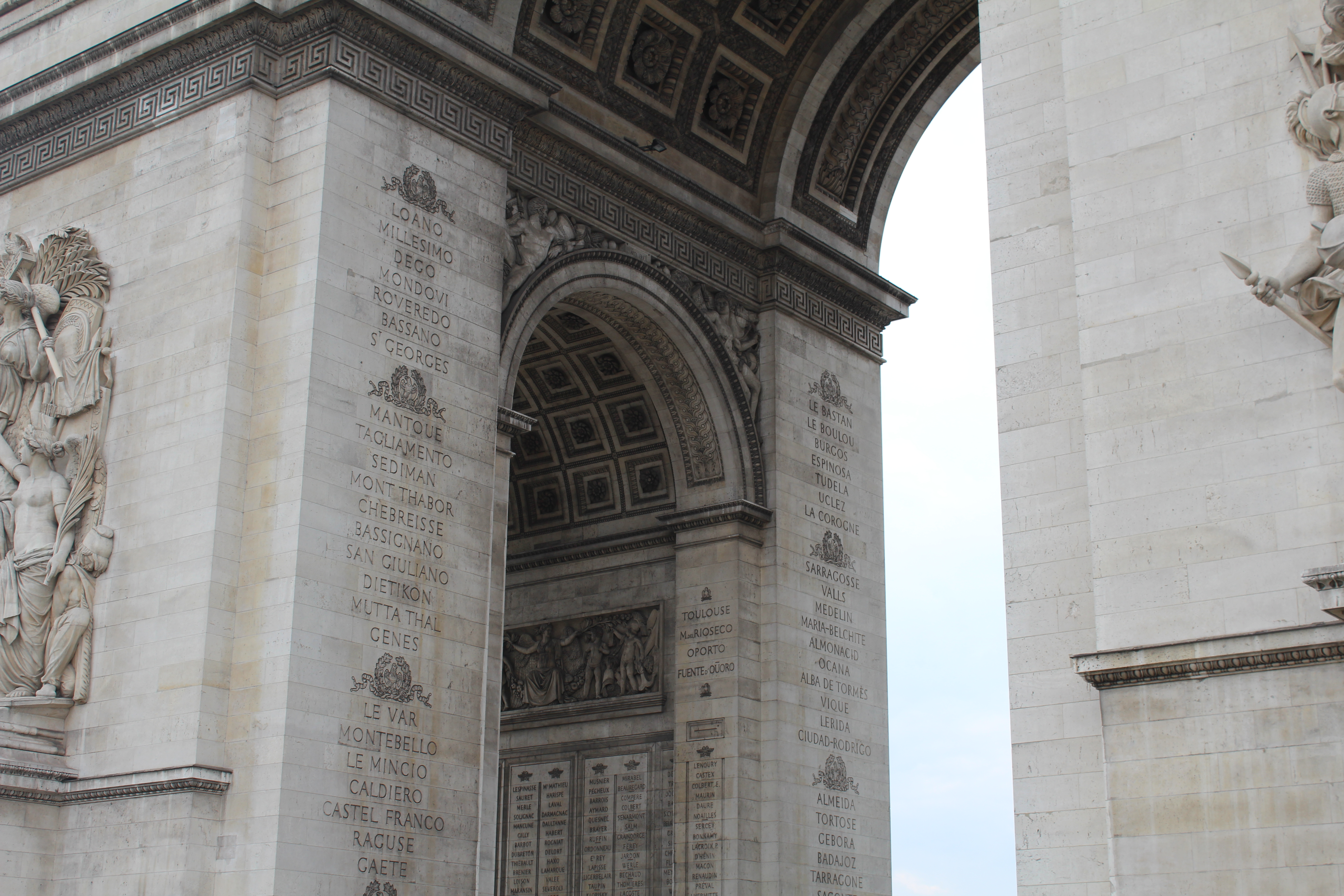
Great arches
96 battles.

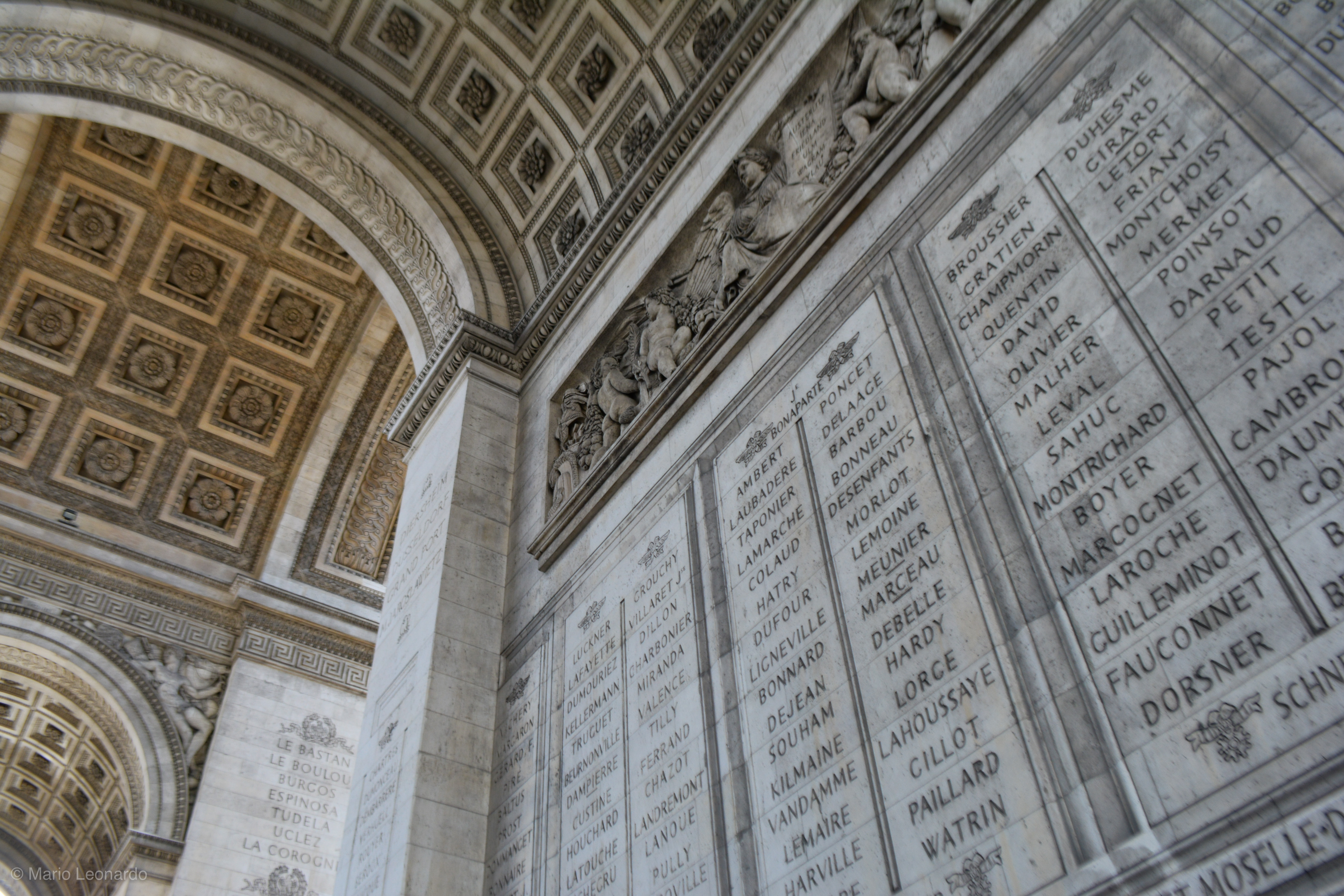
Small arches
32 battles.

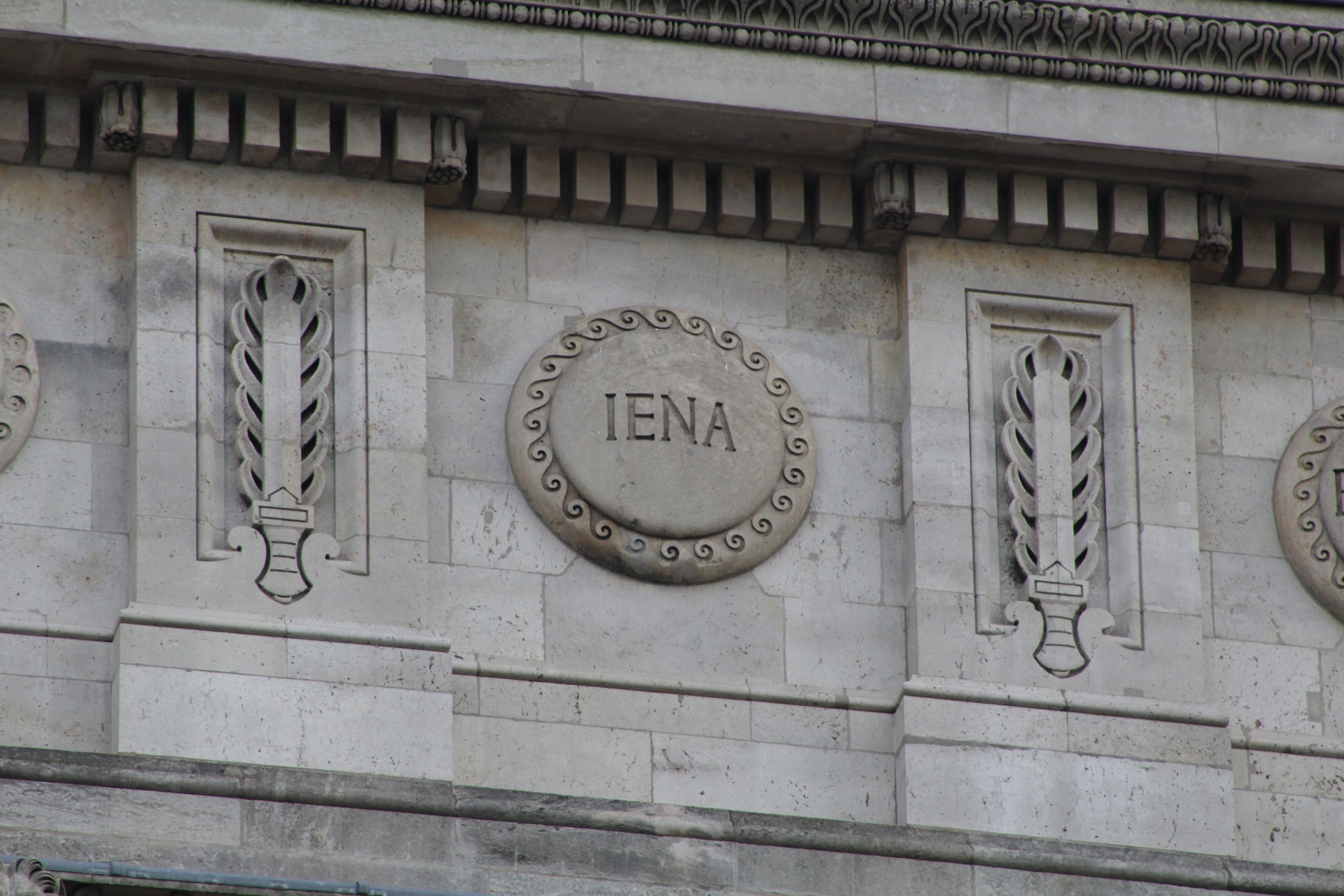
Attic
30 battles.

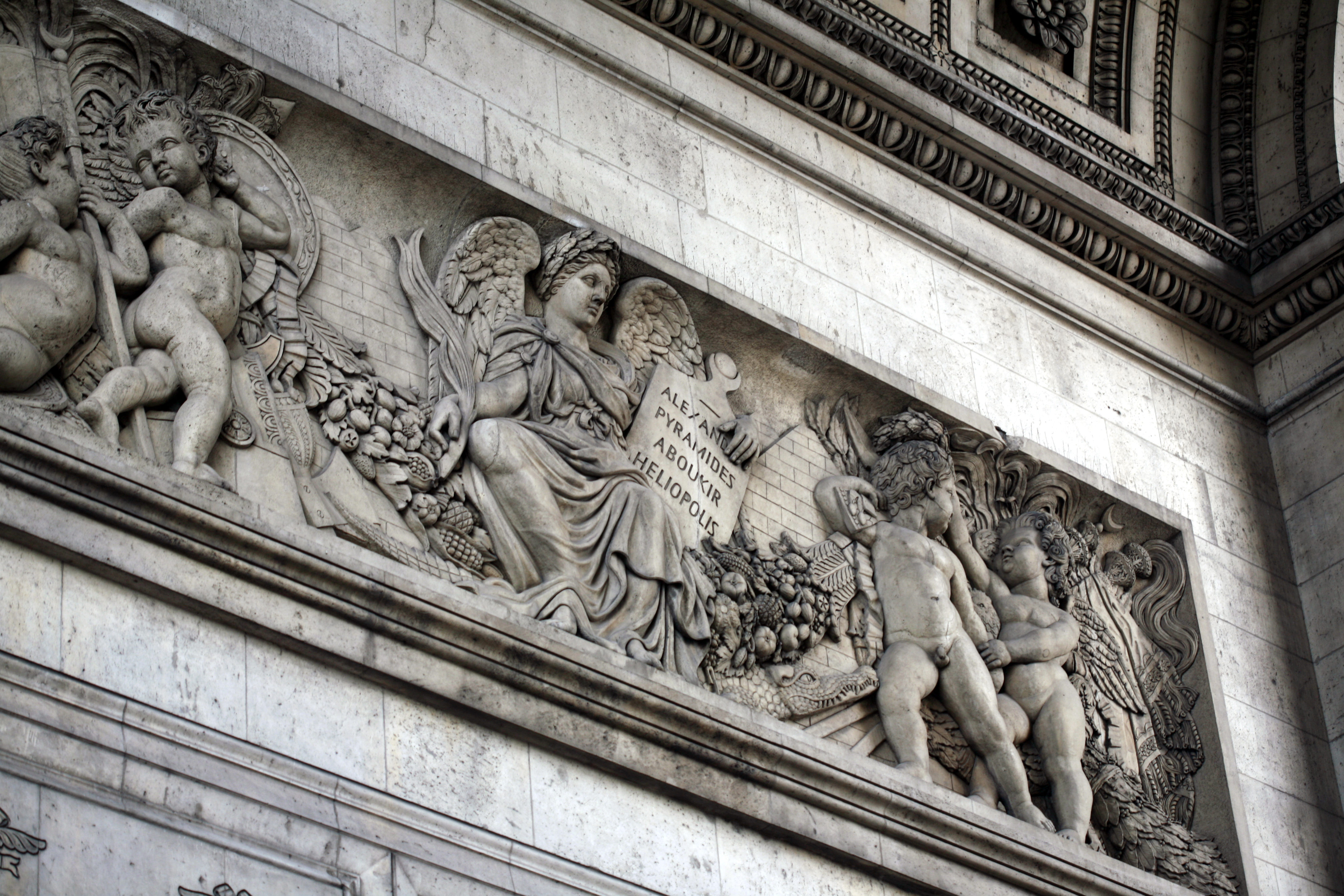
Low reliefs
16 battles.

== Great arches ==
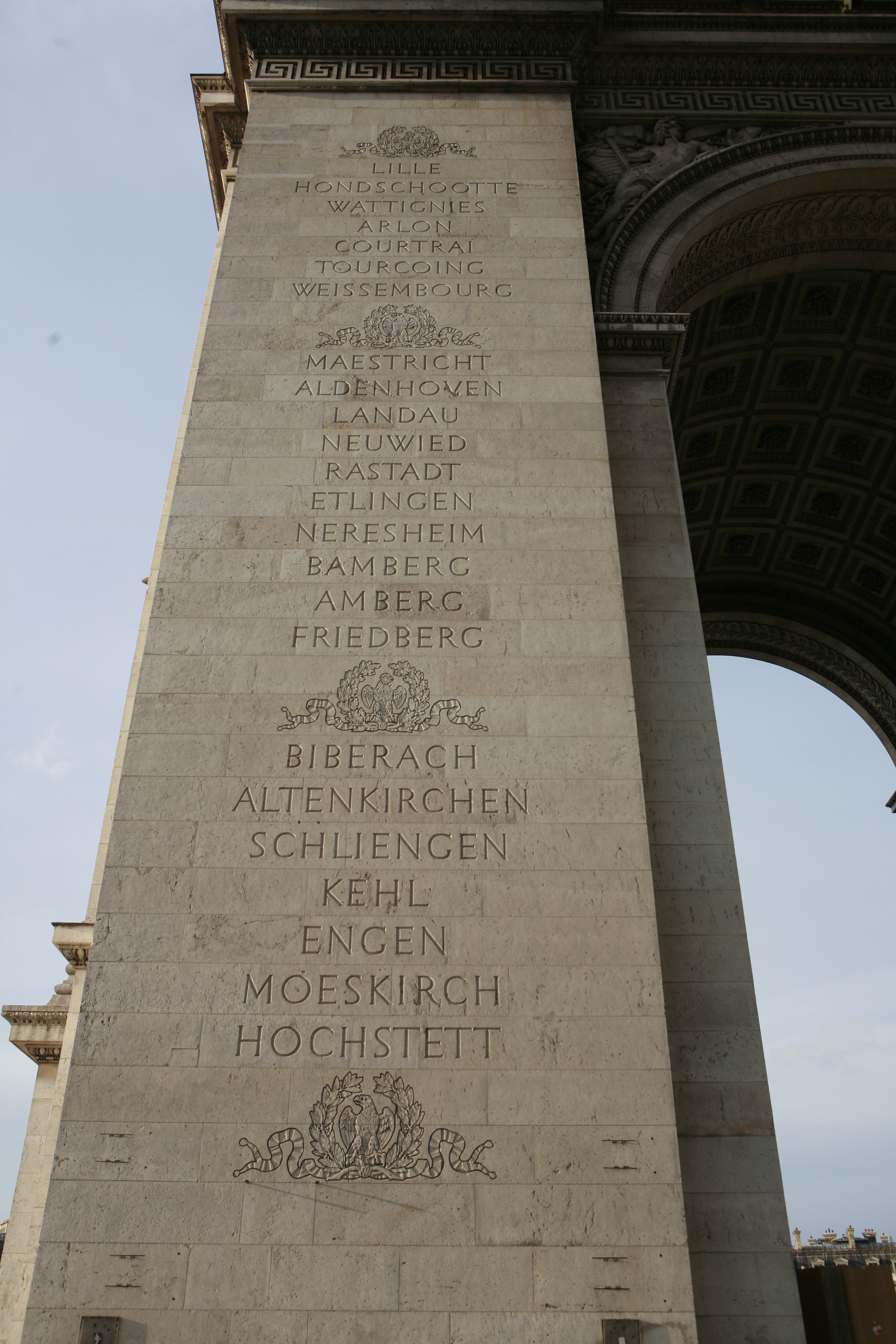
Northern pillar: Siege of Lille – Battle of Höchstädt.

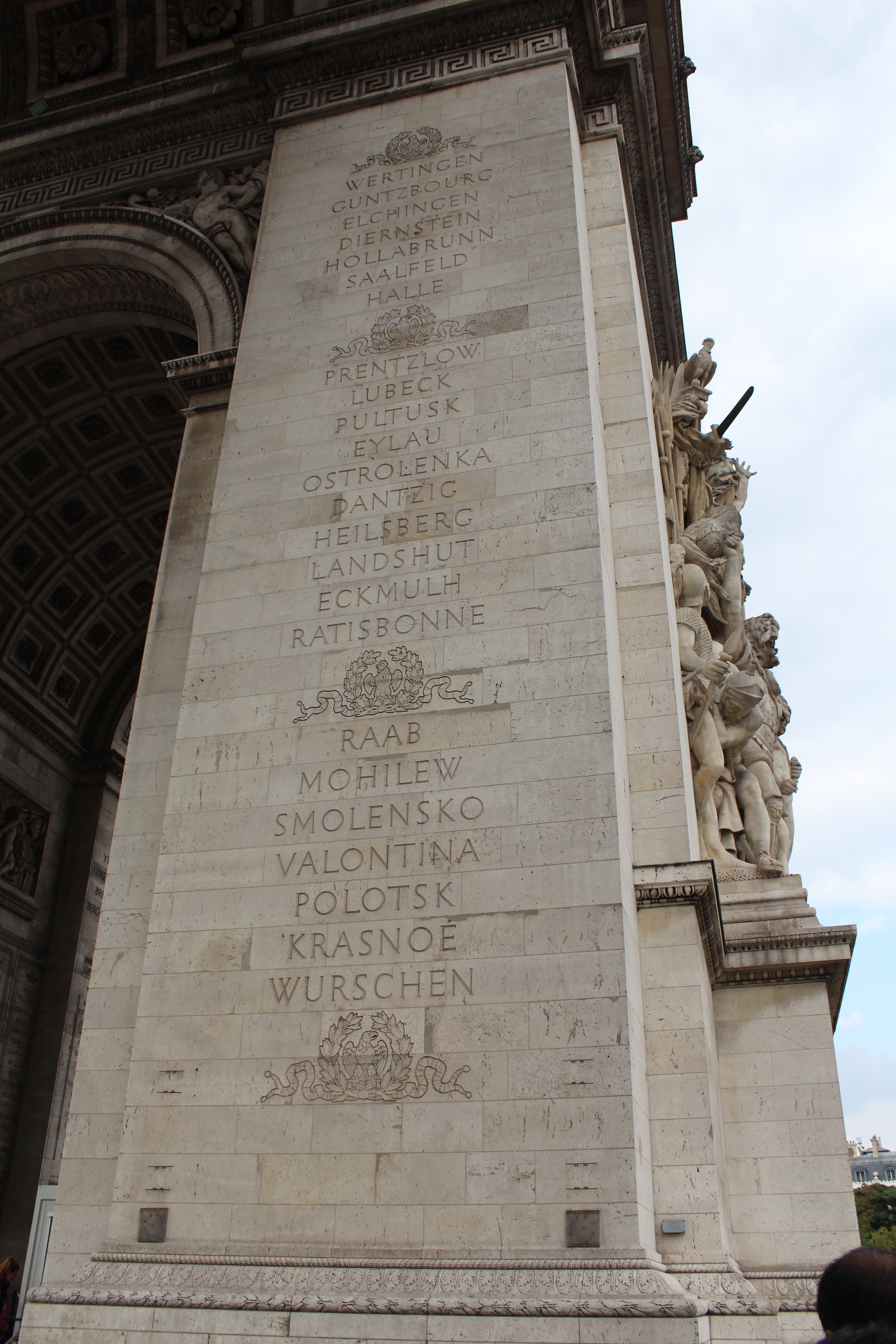
Eastern pillar: Battle of Wertingen – Battle of Bautzen.

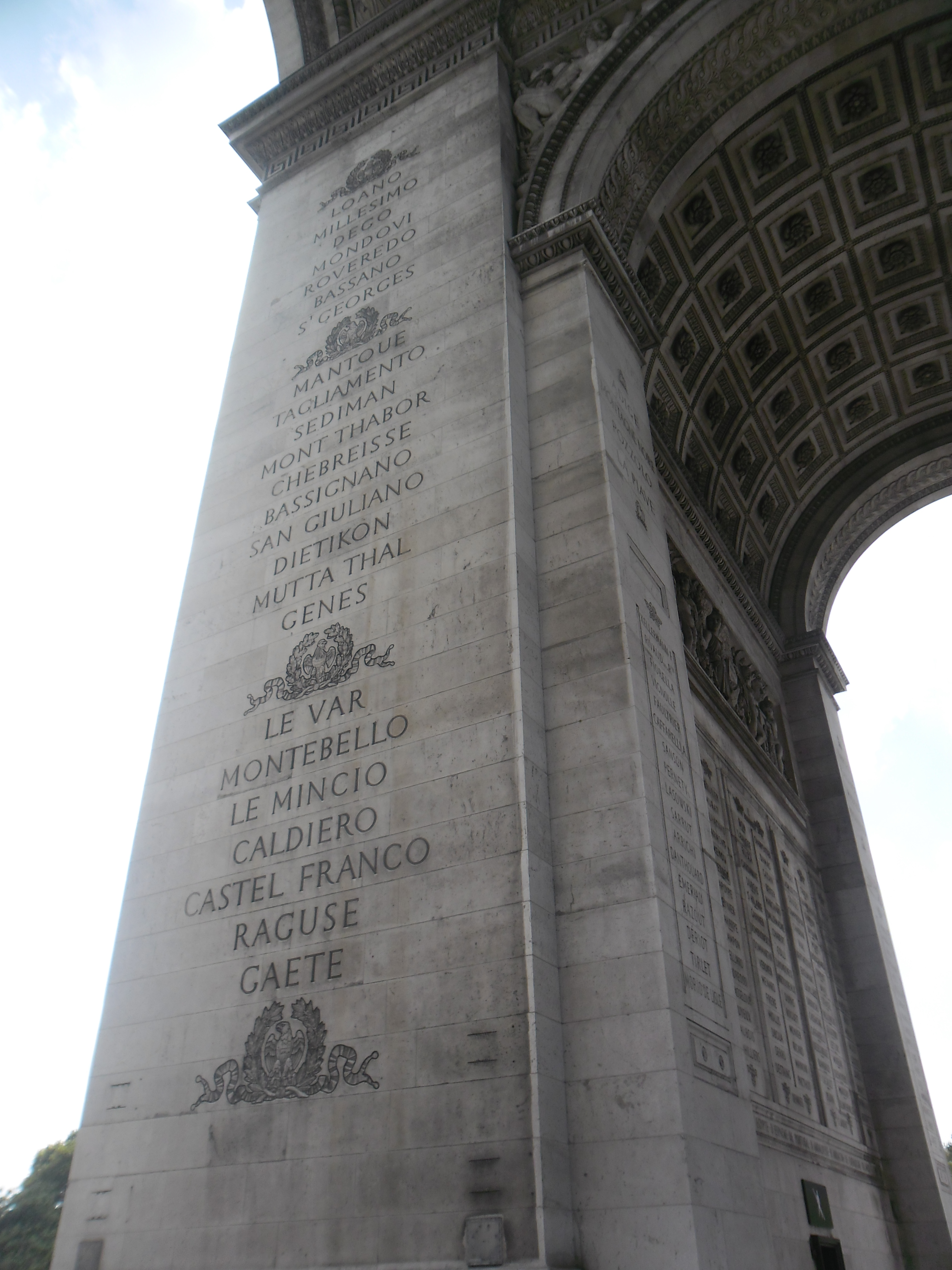
Southern pillar: Battle of Loano – Siege of Gaeta.

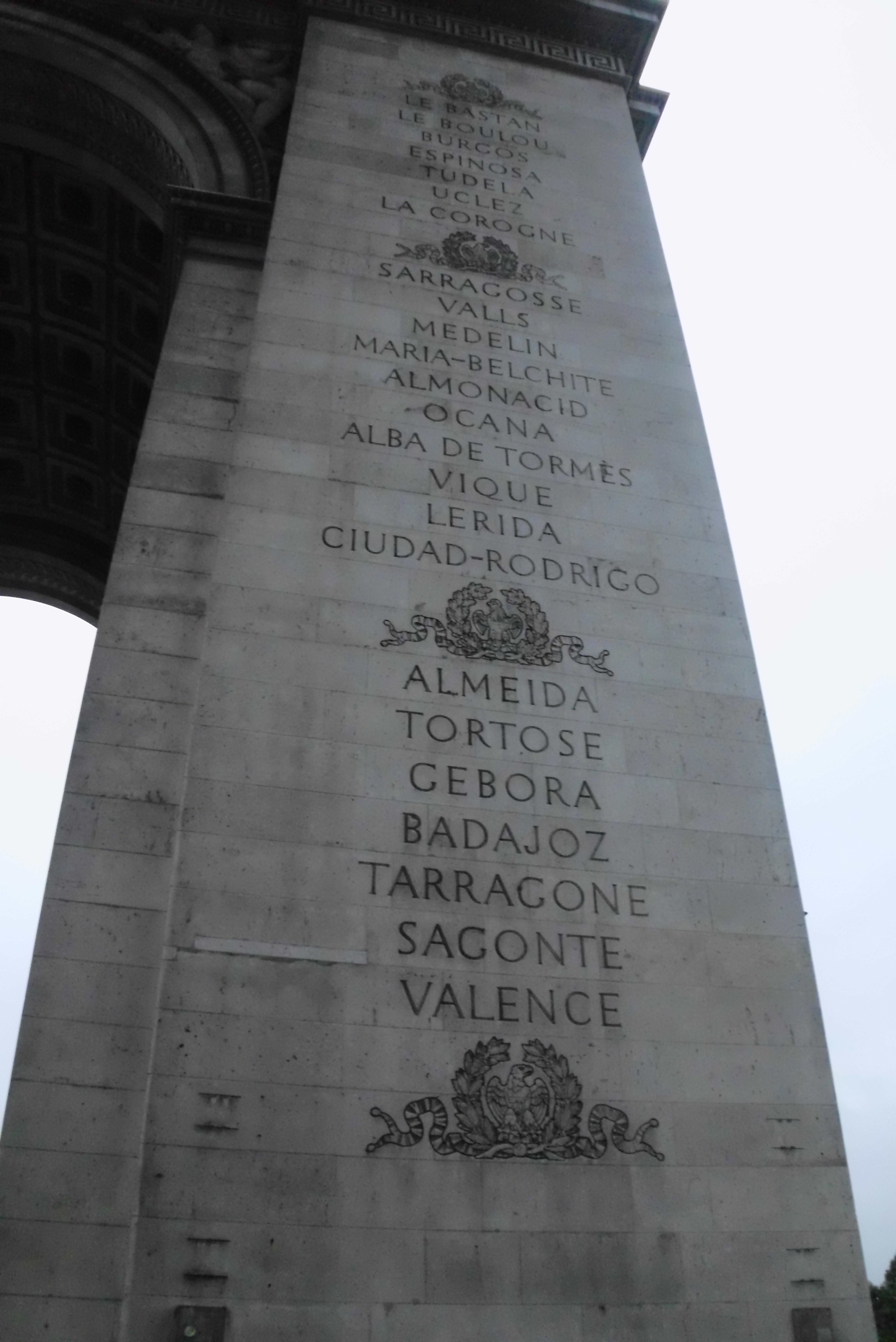
Western pillar: Battle of the Baztan Valley – Siege of Valencia.

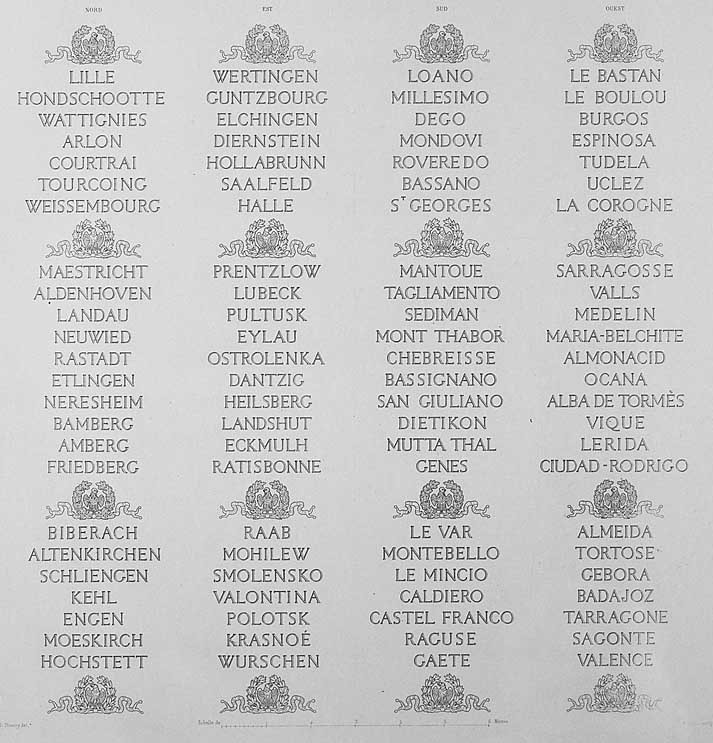
List of battles engraved under the great arches of the monument (24 on each of the four pillars).

The names of the 96 battles inscribed under the great arches

Northern pillar	Eastern pillar	Southern pillar	Western pillar
•	•	•	•
LILLE	WERTINGEN	LOANO	LE BASTAN
HONDSCHOOTTE	GUNTZBOURG	MILLESIMO	LE BOULOU
WATTIGNIES	ELCHINGEN	DEGO	BURGOS
ARLON	DIERNSTEIN	MONDOVI	ESPINOSA
COURTRAI	HOLLABRUNN	ROVEREDO	TUDELA
TOURCOING	SAALFELD	BASSANO	UCLEZ
WEISSEMBOURG	HALLE	S^{T} GEORGES	LA COROGNE
•	•	•	•
MAESTRICHT	PRENTZLOW	MANTOUE	SARRAGOSSE
ALDENHOVEN	LUBECK	TAGLIAMENTO	VALLS
LANDAU	PULTUSK	SEDIMAN	MEDELLIN
NEUWIED	EYLAU	MONT THABOR	MARIA-BELCHITE
RASTADT	OSTROLENKA	CHEBREISSE	ALMONACID
ETLINGEN	DANTZIG	BASSIGNANO	OCANA
NERESHEIM	HEILSBERG	SAN GIULIANO	ALBA DE TORMÈS
BAMBERG	LANDSHUT	DIETIKON	VIQUE
AMBERG	ECKMULH	MUTTA THAL	LERIDA
FRIEDBERG	RATISBONNE	GENES	CIUDAD-RODRIGO
•	•	•	•
BIBERACH	RAAB	LE VAR	ALMEIDA
ALTENKIRCHEN	MOHILEW	MONTEBELLO	TORTOSE
SCHLIENGEN	SMOLENSKO	LE MINCIO	GEBORA
KEHL	VALONTINA	CALDIERO	BADAJOZ
ENGEN	POLOTZK	CASTEL FRANCO	TARRAGONE
MOESKIRCH	KRASNOÉ	RAGUSE	SAGONTE
HOCHSTETT	WURSCHEN	GAETE	VALENCE
•	•	•	•

== Small arches ==
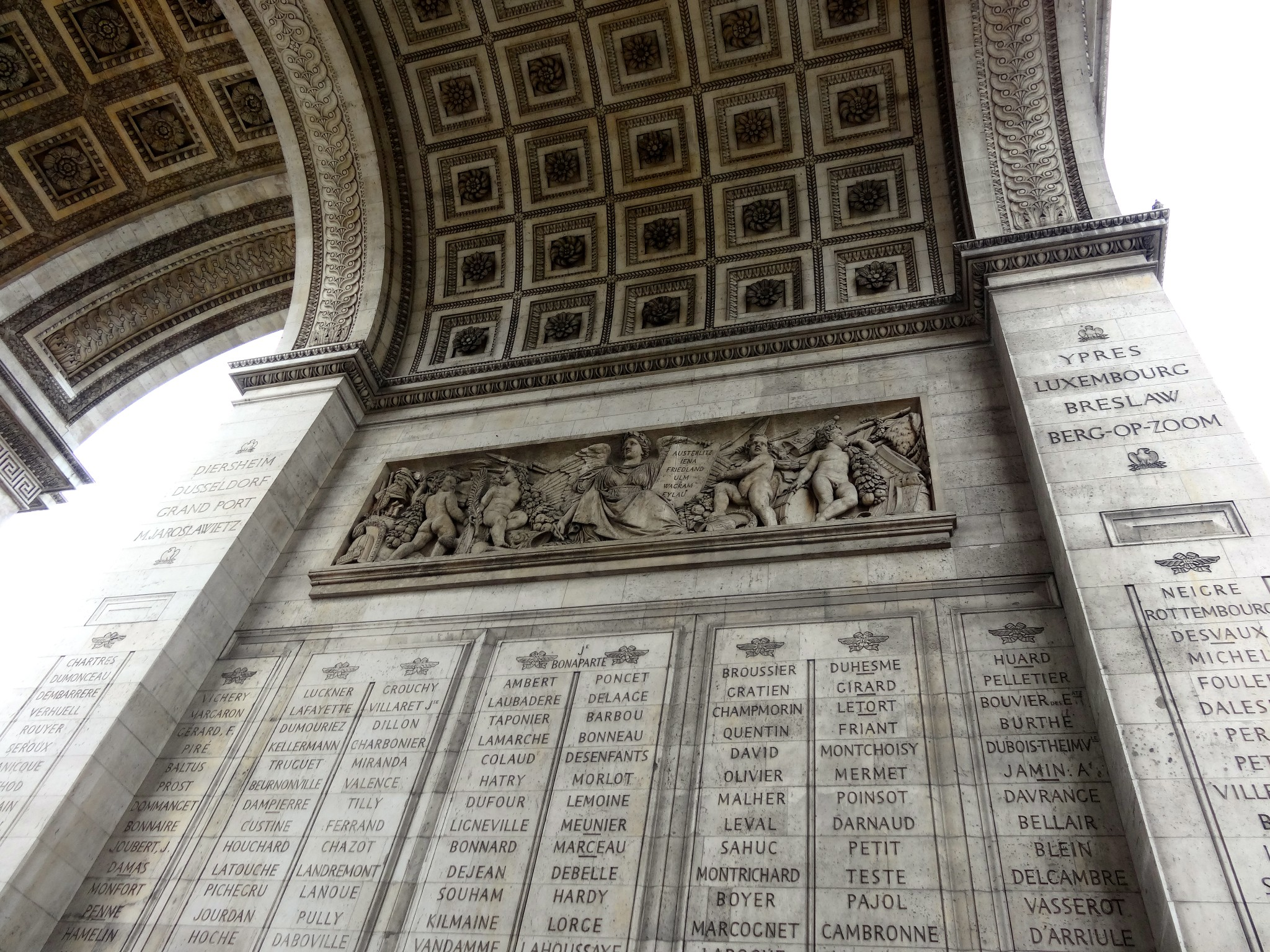
Northern pillar: Battle of Diersheim – Siege of Bergen op Zoom.

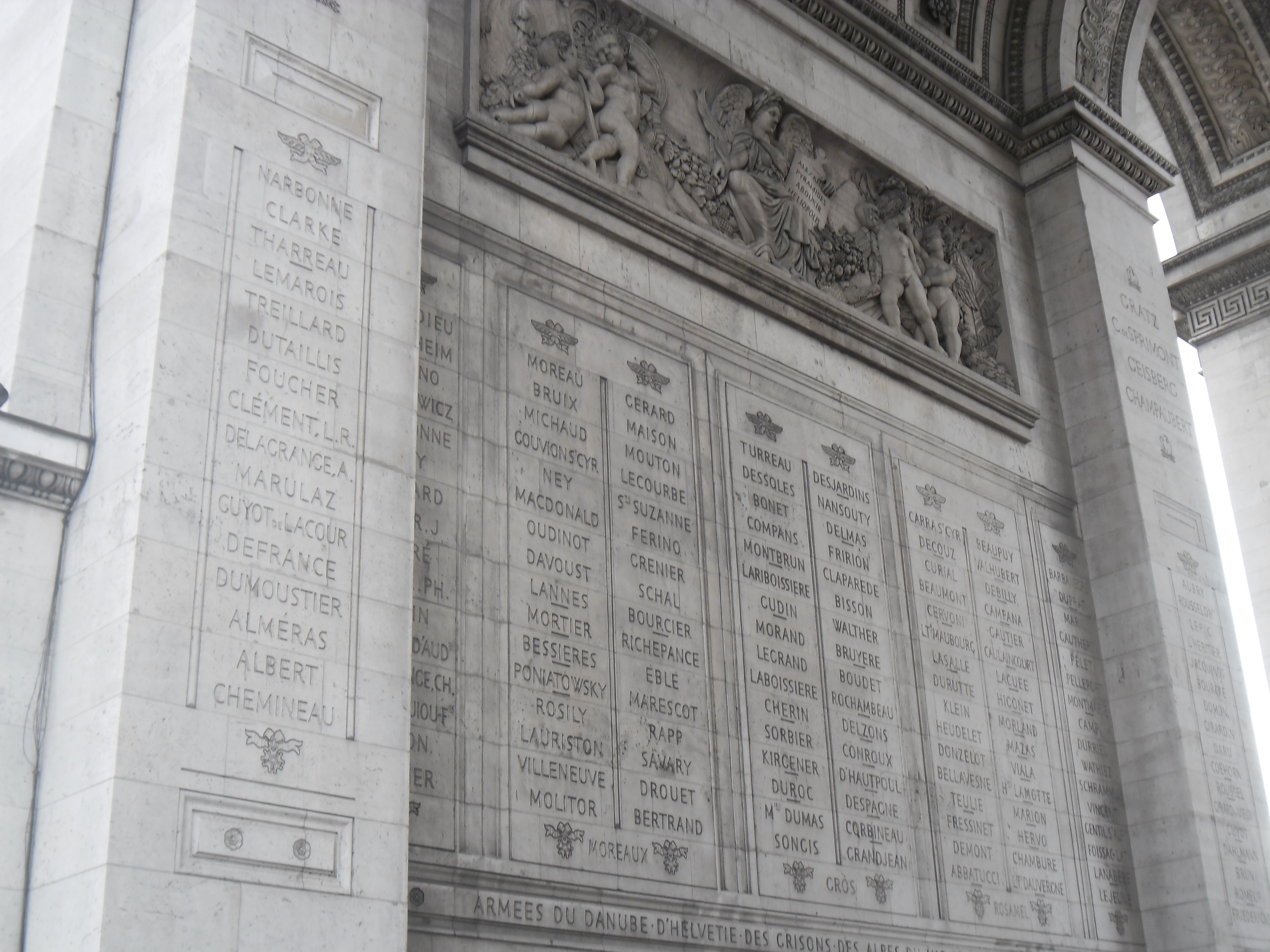
Eastern pillar: Siege of Jaffa – Battle of Champaubert.

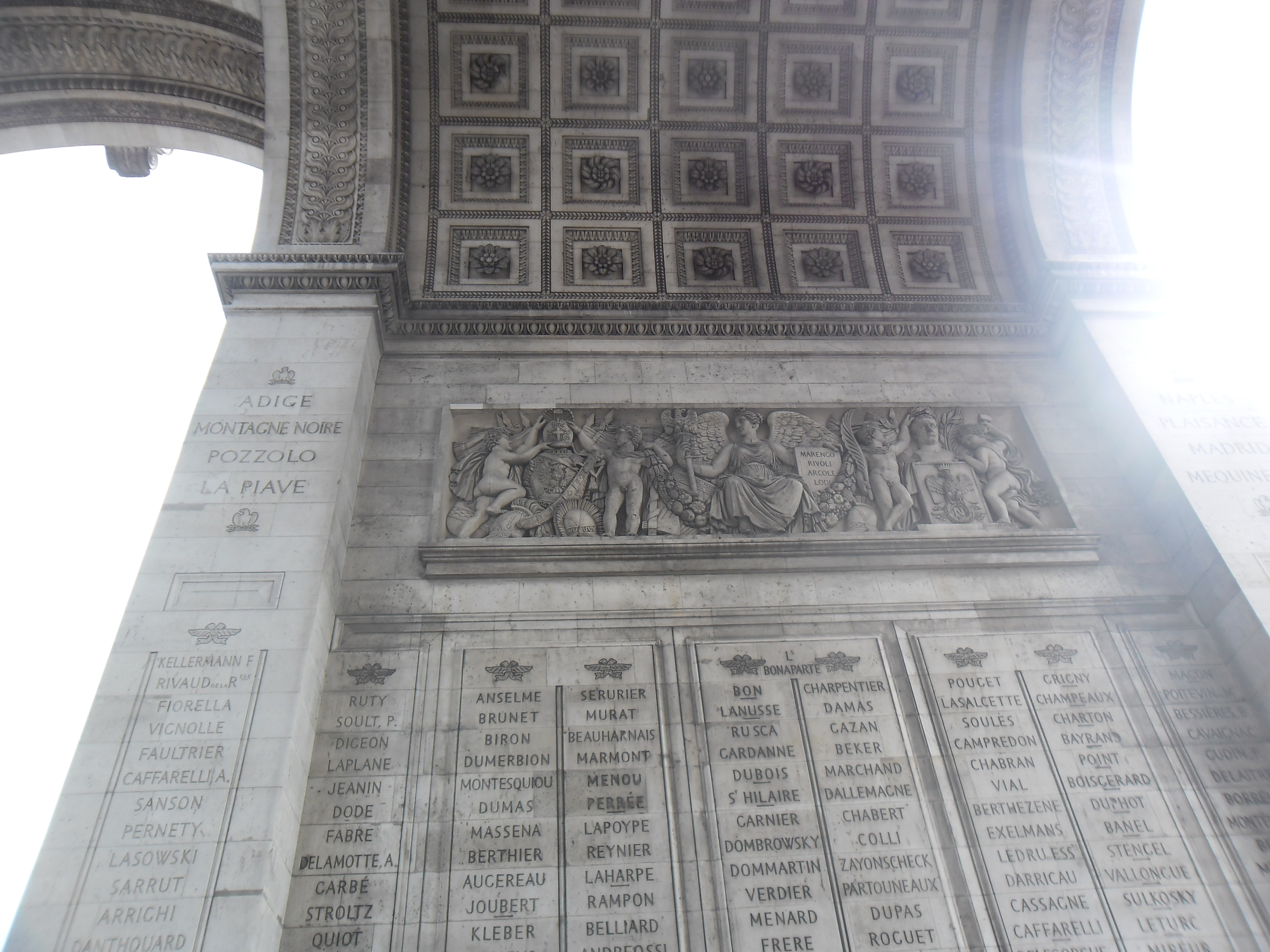
Southern pillar: Battle of Verona – Siege of Mequinenza.

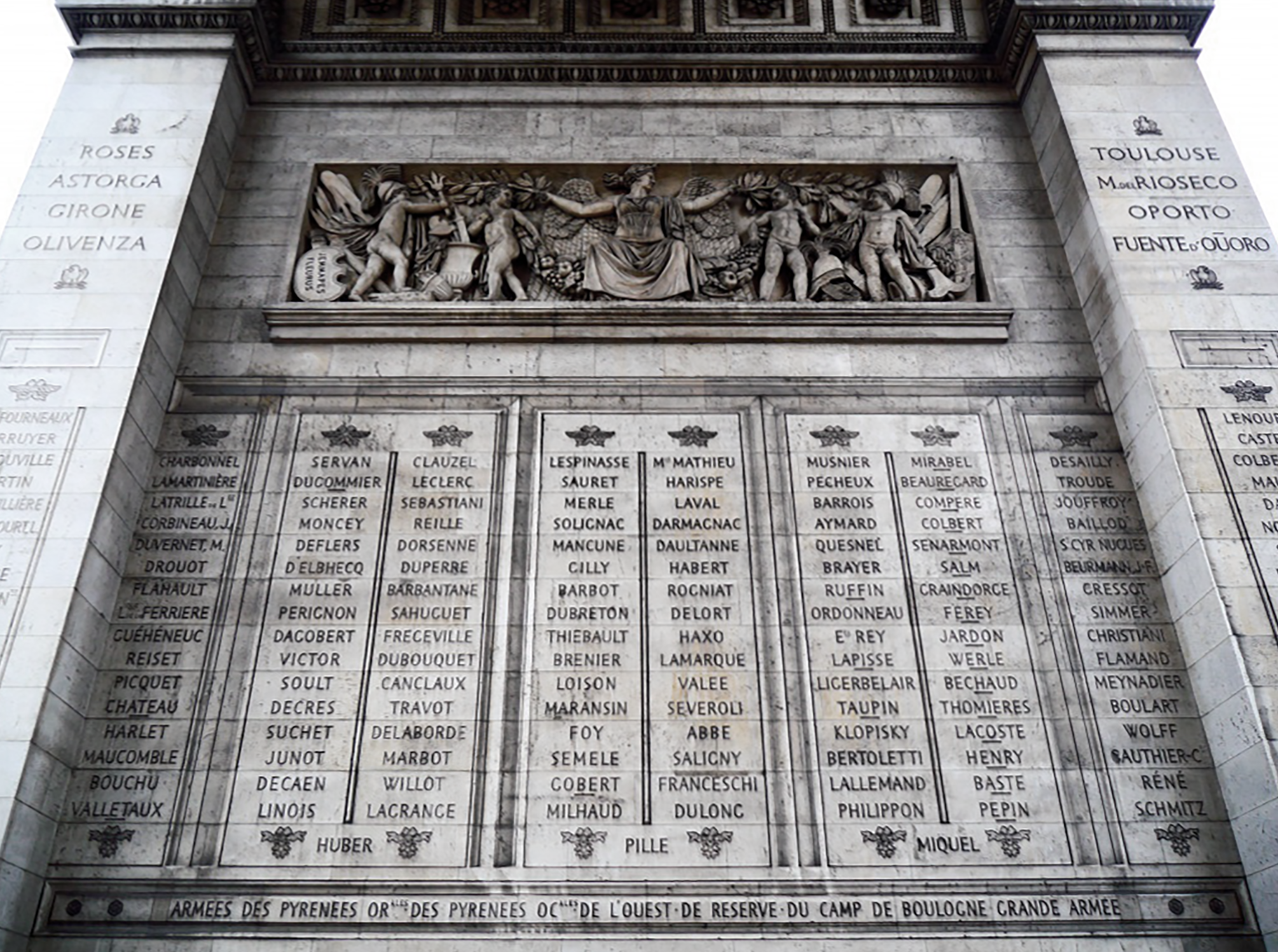
Western pillar: Siege of Roses – Battle of Fuentes de Oñoro.

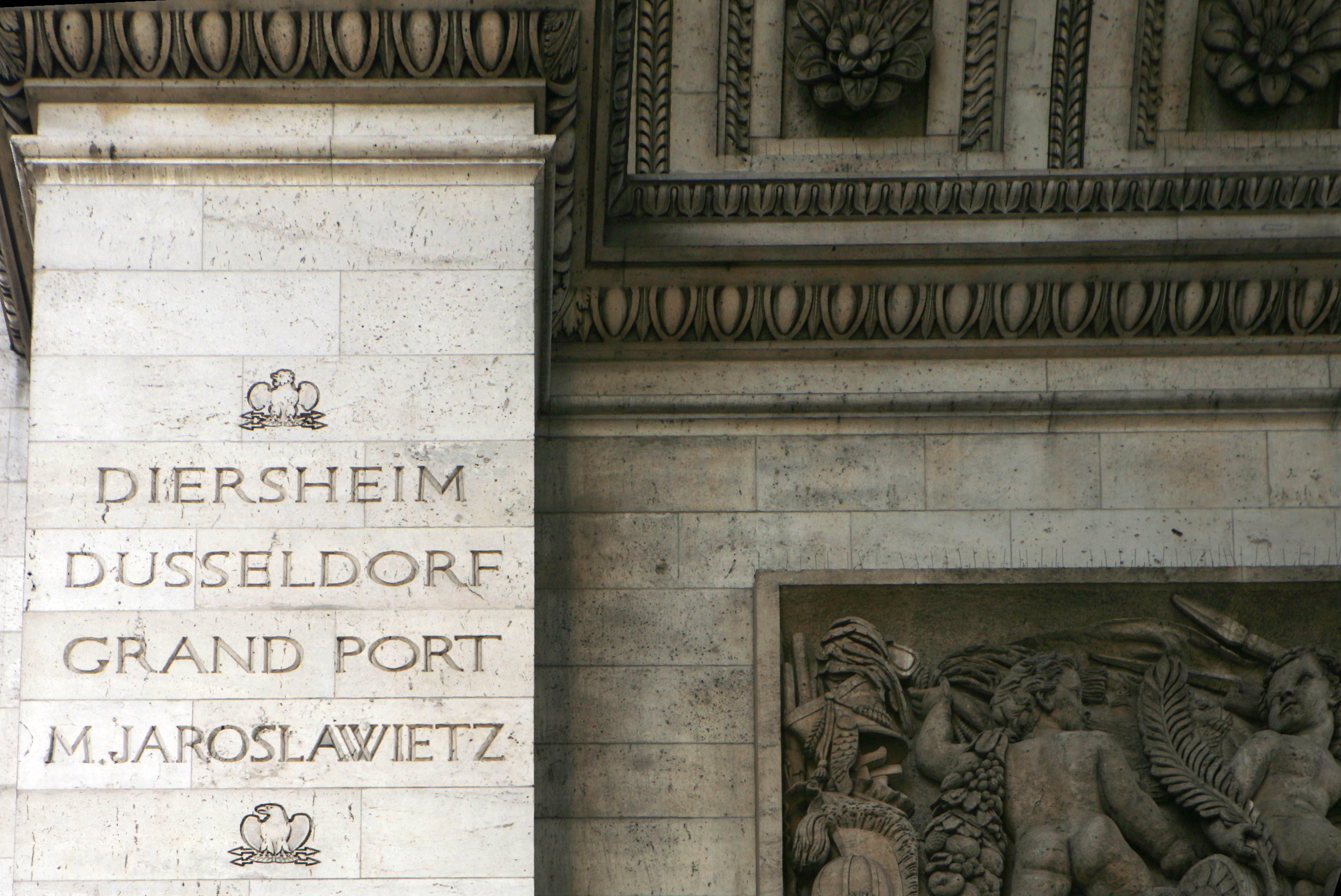
The battles of Diersheim, Düsseldorf, Grand Port and Maloyaroslavets engraved under one of the small arches of the monument (inner façade of the northern pillar, left column).

The names of the 32 battles inscribed under the small arches

Northern pillar	Eastern pillar	Southern pillar	Western pillar
•	•	•	•
Left column	Left column	Left column	Left column
DIERSHEIM	JAFFA	ADIGE	ROSES
DUSSELDORF	PESCHIERA	MONTAGNE NOIRE	ASTORGA
GRAND PORT	CAIRE	POZZOLO	GIRONE
M.JAROSLAWIETZ	CAPRÉE	LA PIAVE	OLIVENZA
•	•	•	•
Right column	Right column	Right column	Right column
YPRES	GRATZ	NAPLES	TOULOUSE
LUXEMBOURG	C. DE SPRIMONT	PLAISANCE	M. DEL RIOSECO
BRESLAW	GEISBERG	MADRID	OPORTO
BERG-OP-ZOOM	CHAMPAUBERT	MEQUINENZA	FUENTE D'OŨORO
•	•	•	•

== Attic ==
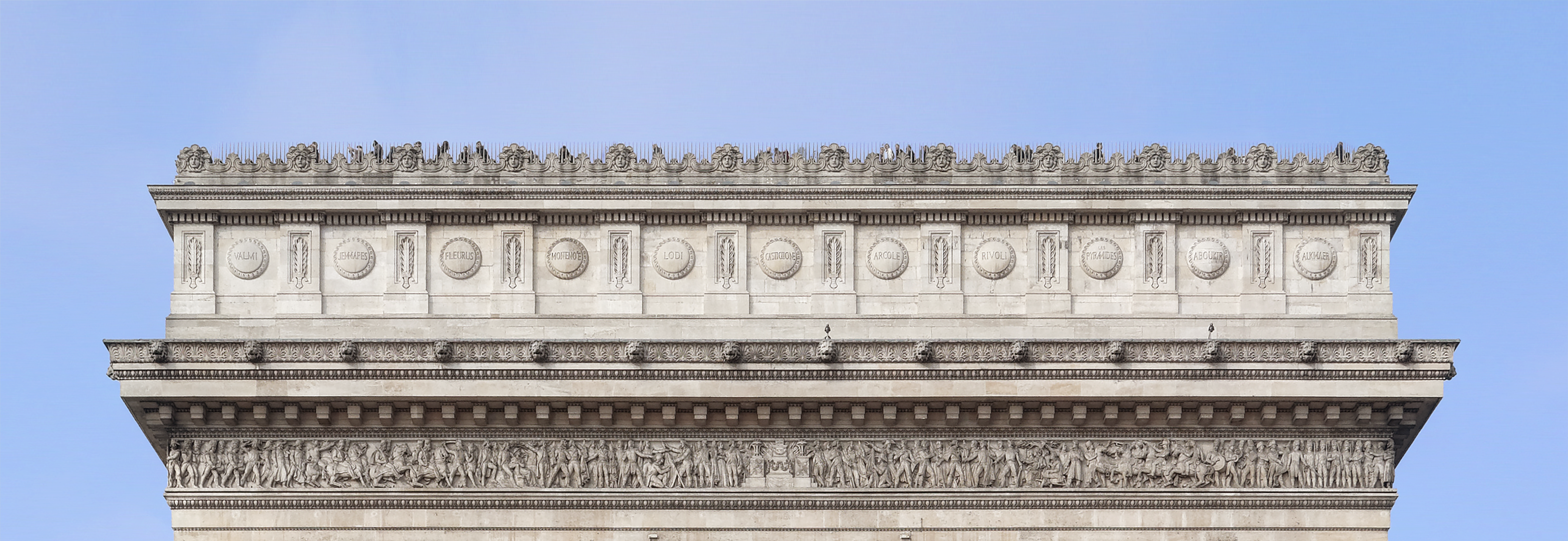
Avenue des Champs-Élysées: Battle of Valmy – Battle of Alkmaer.

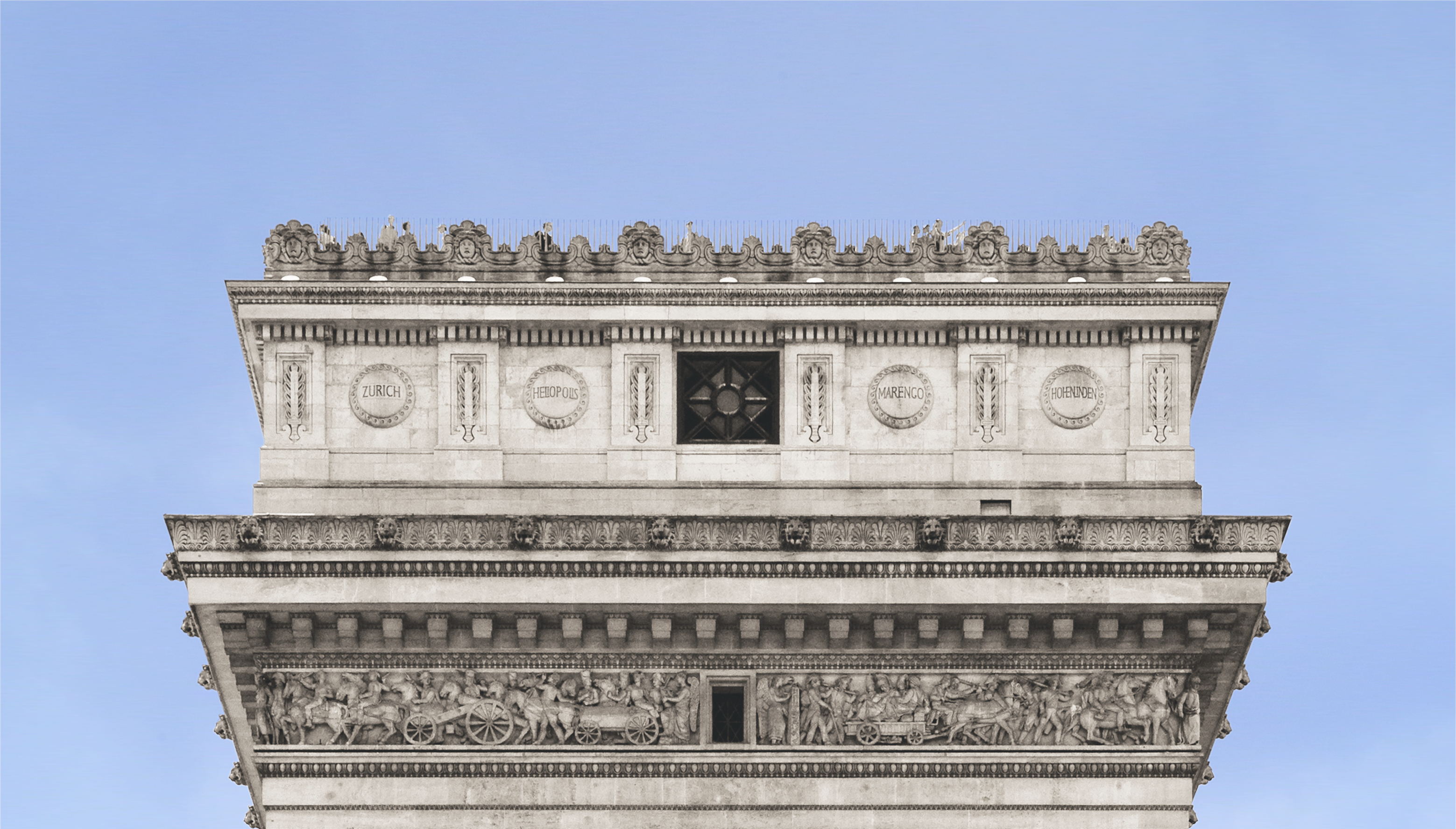
Avenue de Wagram: Battle of Zurich – Battle of Hohenlinden.

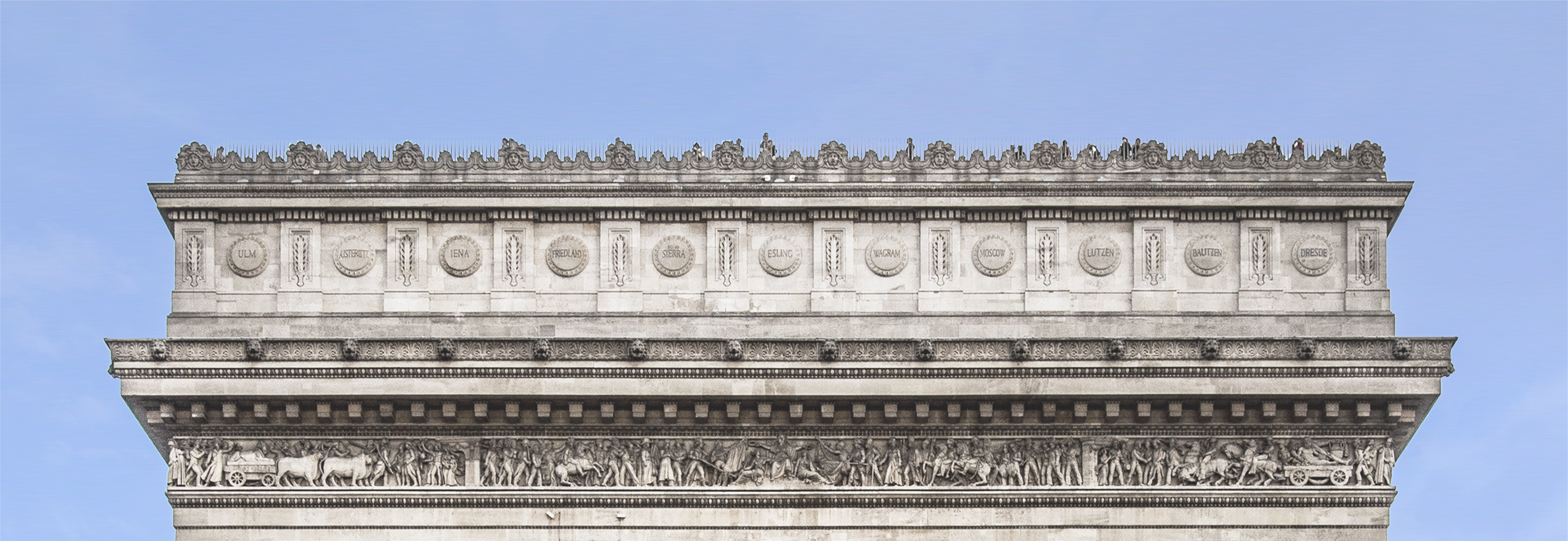
Avenue de la Grande Armée: Battle of Ulm – Battle of Dresden.

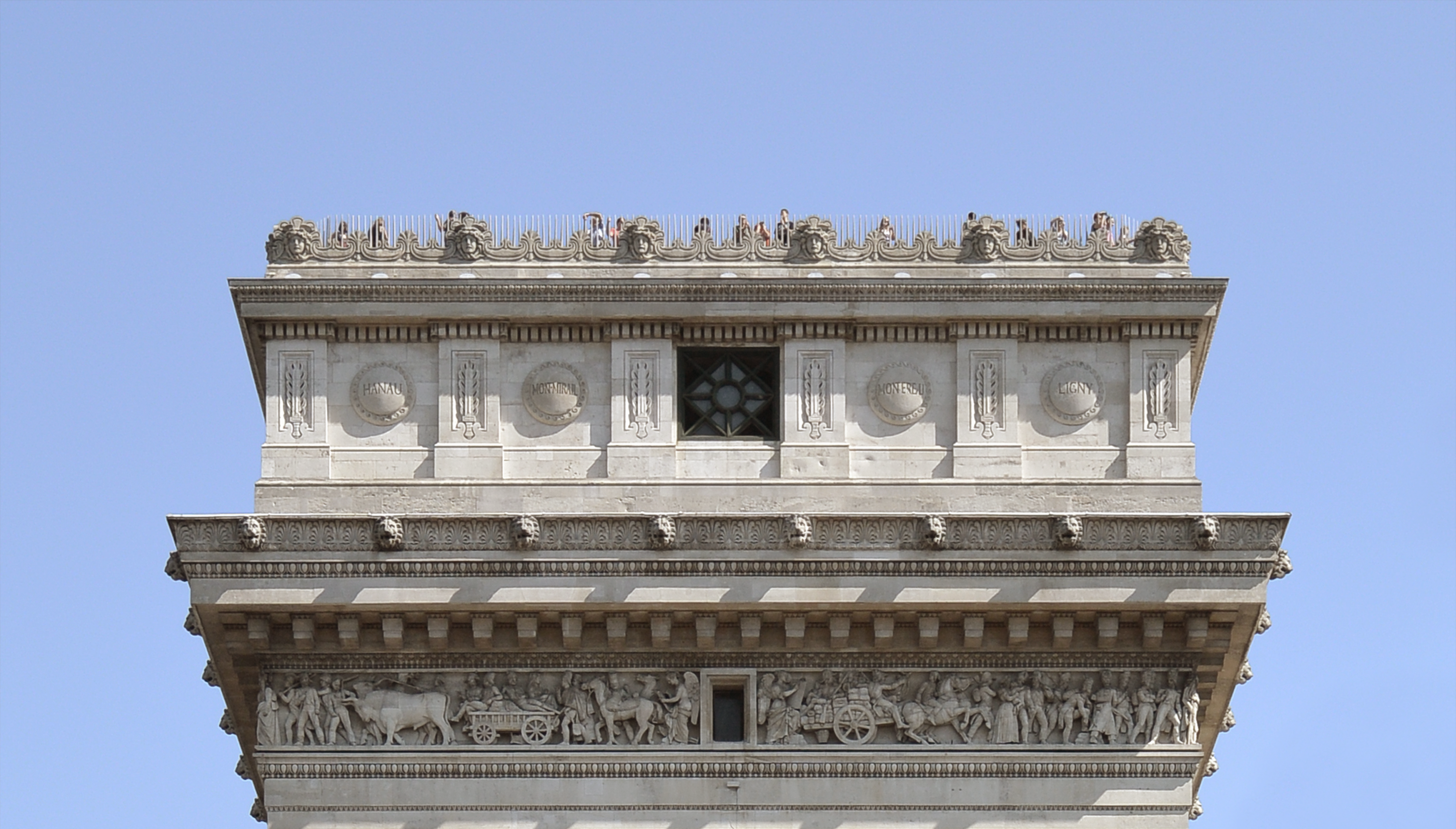
Avenue Kléber: Battle of Hanau – Battle of Ligny.

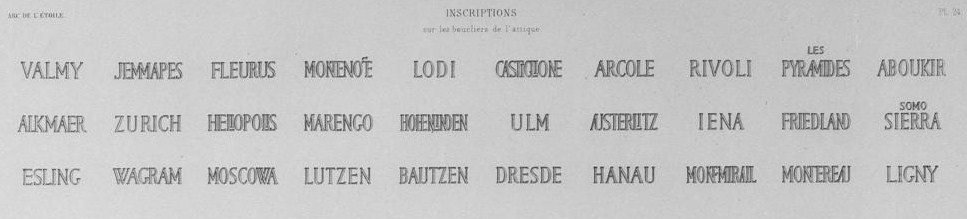
List of battles engraved in chronological order on the attic of the monument (11 on each of the long façades and 4 on each of the short ones).

The names of the 30 battles inscribed on the shields of the attic

Avenue des Champs-Élysées
VALMY ・ JEMMAPES ・ FLEURUS ・ MONTENOTTE ・ LODI ・ CASTIGLIONE ・ ARCOLE ・ RIVOLI ・ LES PYRAMIDES ・ ABOUKIR ・ ALKMAER
•
Avenue de Wagram
ZURICH ・ HELIOPOLIS ・ MARENGO ・ HOHENLINDEN
•
Avenue de la Grande Armée
ULM ・ AUSTERLITZ ・ IENA ・ FRIEDLAND ・ SOMO SIERRA ・ ESLING ・ WAGRAM ・ MOSKOWA ・ LUTZEN ・ BAUTZEN ・ DRESDE
•
Avenue Kléber
HANAU ・ MONTMIRAIL ・ MONTEREAU ・ LIGNY
•

== Low reliefs ==
=== Inner low reliefs ===
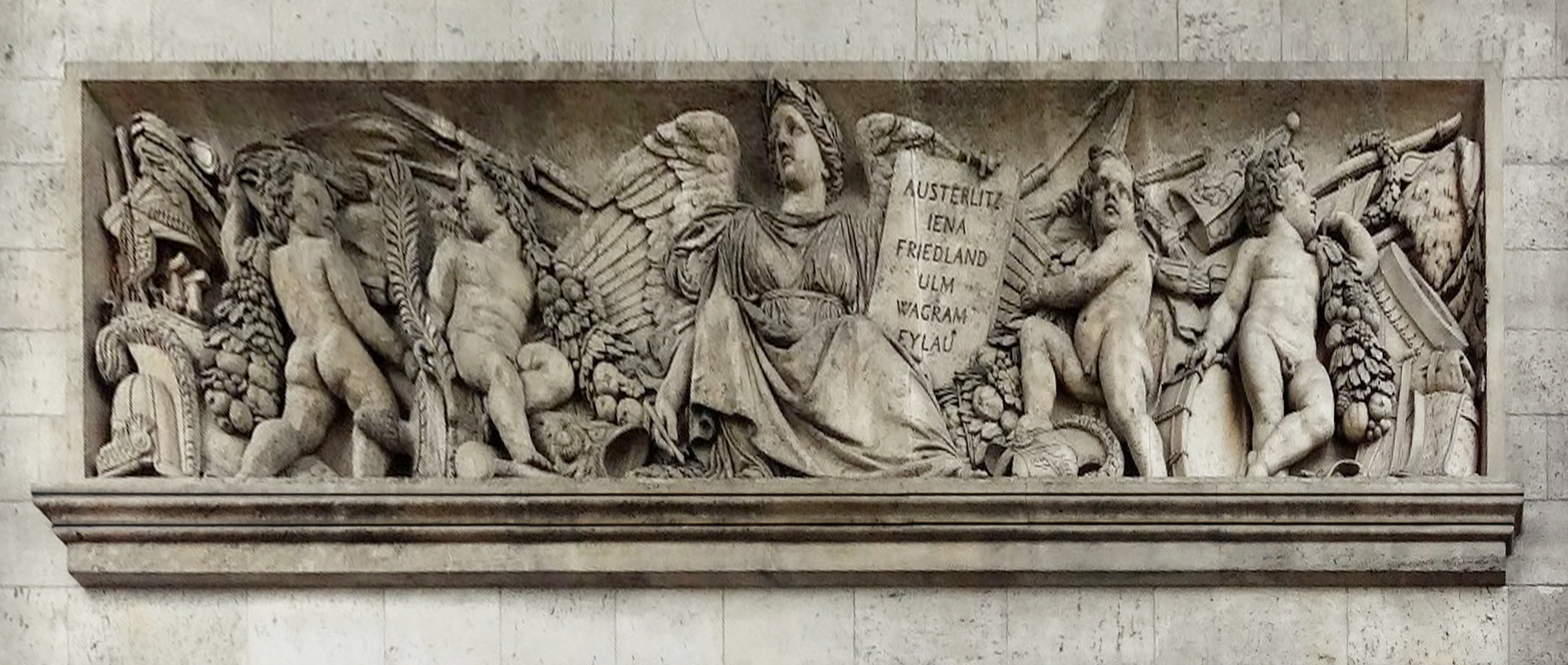
Northern pillar: Battle of Austerlitz – Battle of Eylau.

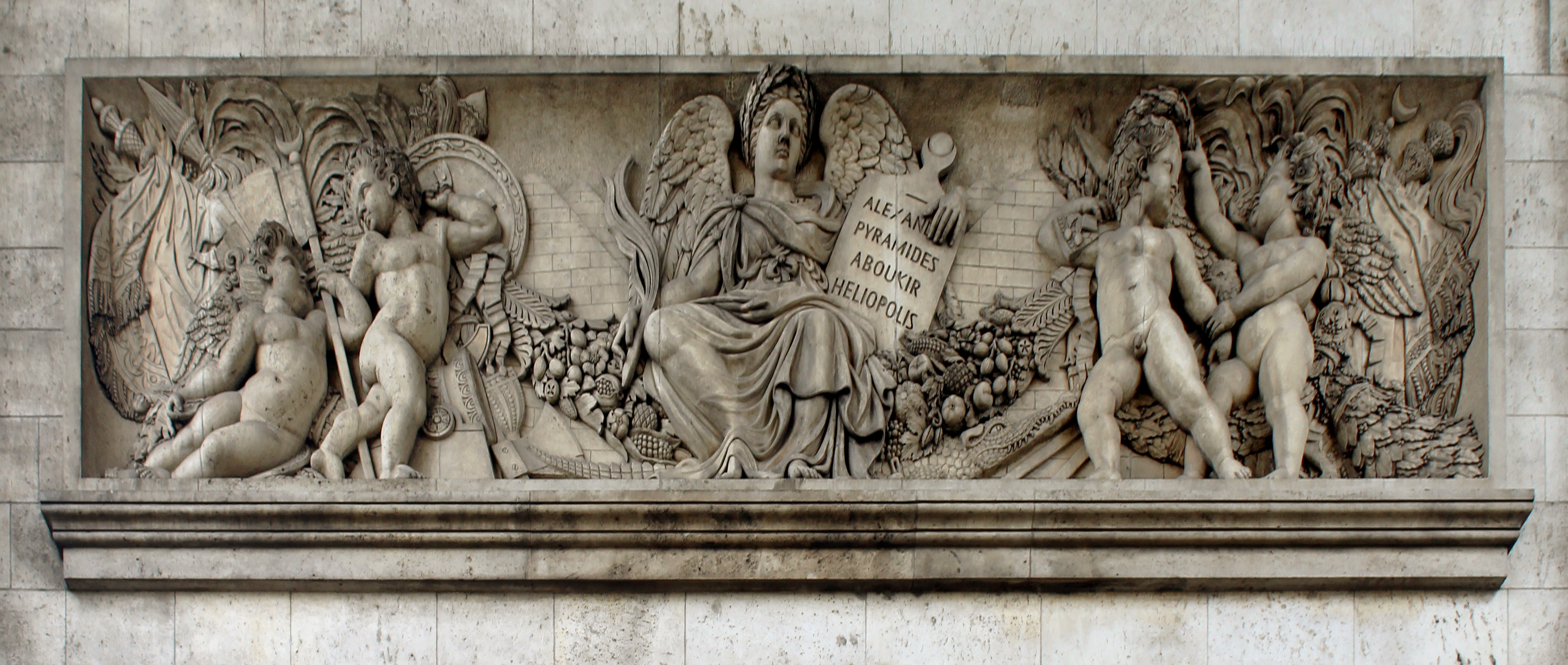
Eastern pillar: Capture of Alexandria – Battle of Heliopolis.

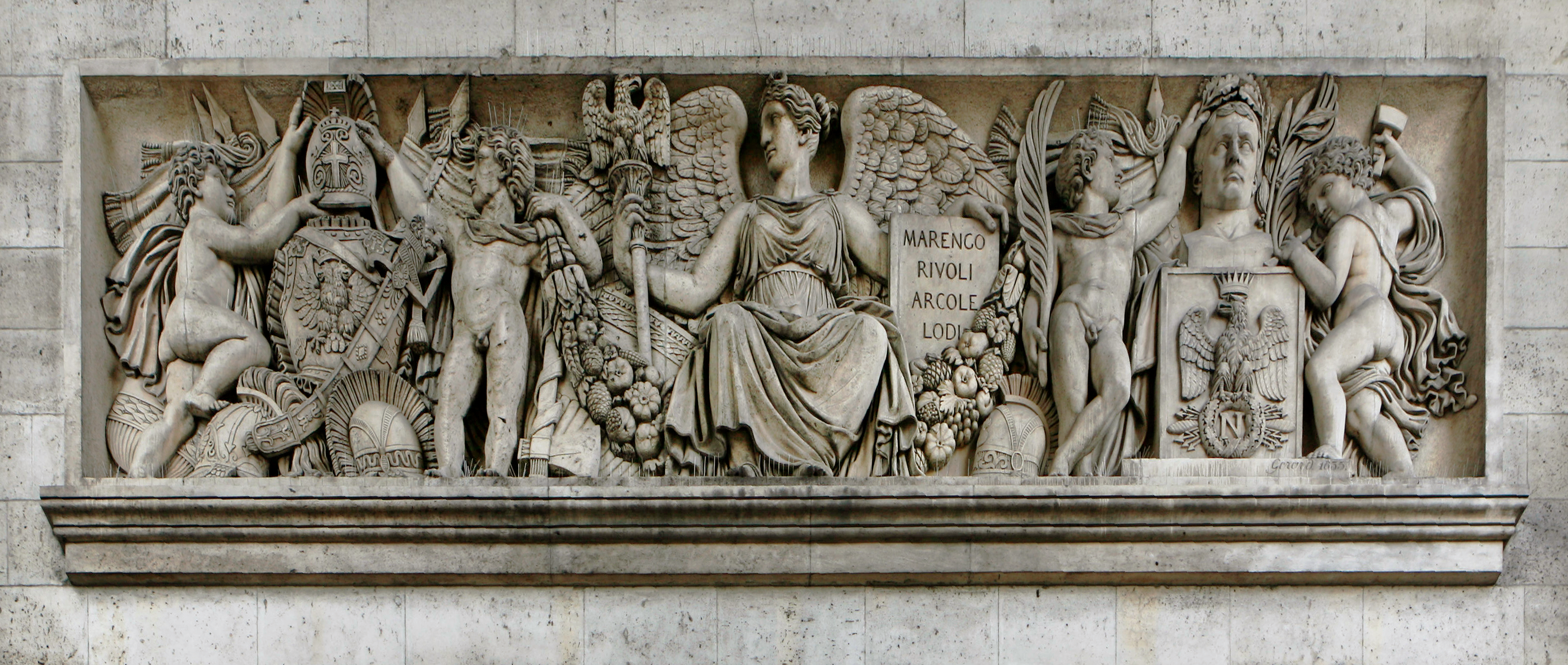
Southern pillar: Battle of Marengo – Battle of Lodi.

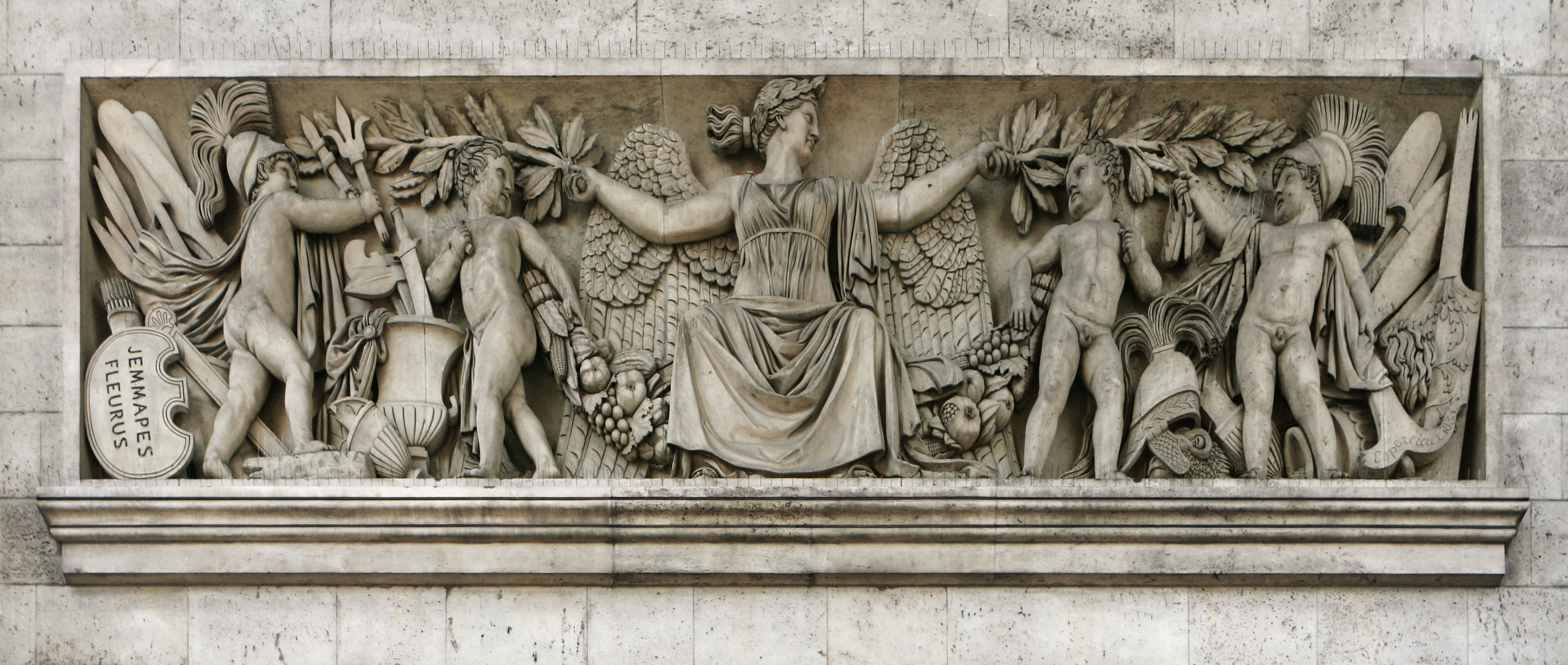
Western pillar: Battle of Jemappes – Battle of Fleurus.

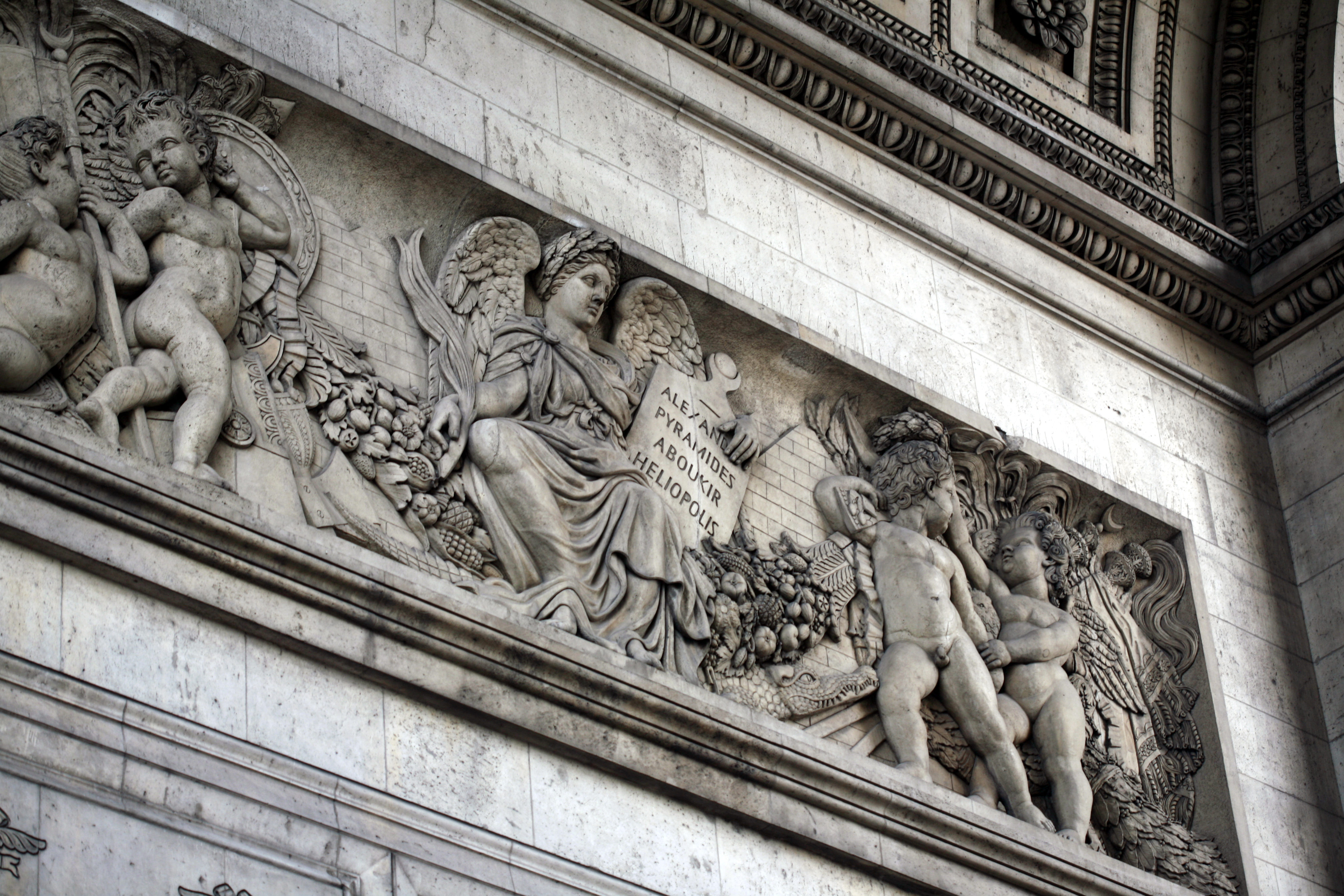
Tablet bearing the names of the battles of Alexandria, the Pyramids, Abukir and Heliopolis, carved in the low relief representing the Attributes of the Victories of the East (inner façade of the eastern pillar).

The names of the 16 battles inscribed on the tablets of the inner low reliefs

Northern pillar	Eastern pillar	Southern pillar	Western pillar
•	•	•	•
AUSTERLITZ	ALEXANDRIE	MARENGO	JEMMAPES
IENA	PYRAMIDES	RIVOLI	FLEURUS
FRIEDLAND	ABOUKIR	ARCOLE	•
ULM	HELIOPOLIS	LODI
WAGRAM	•	•
EYLAU
•

=== Outer low reliefs ===
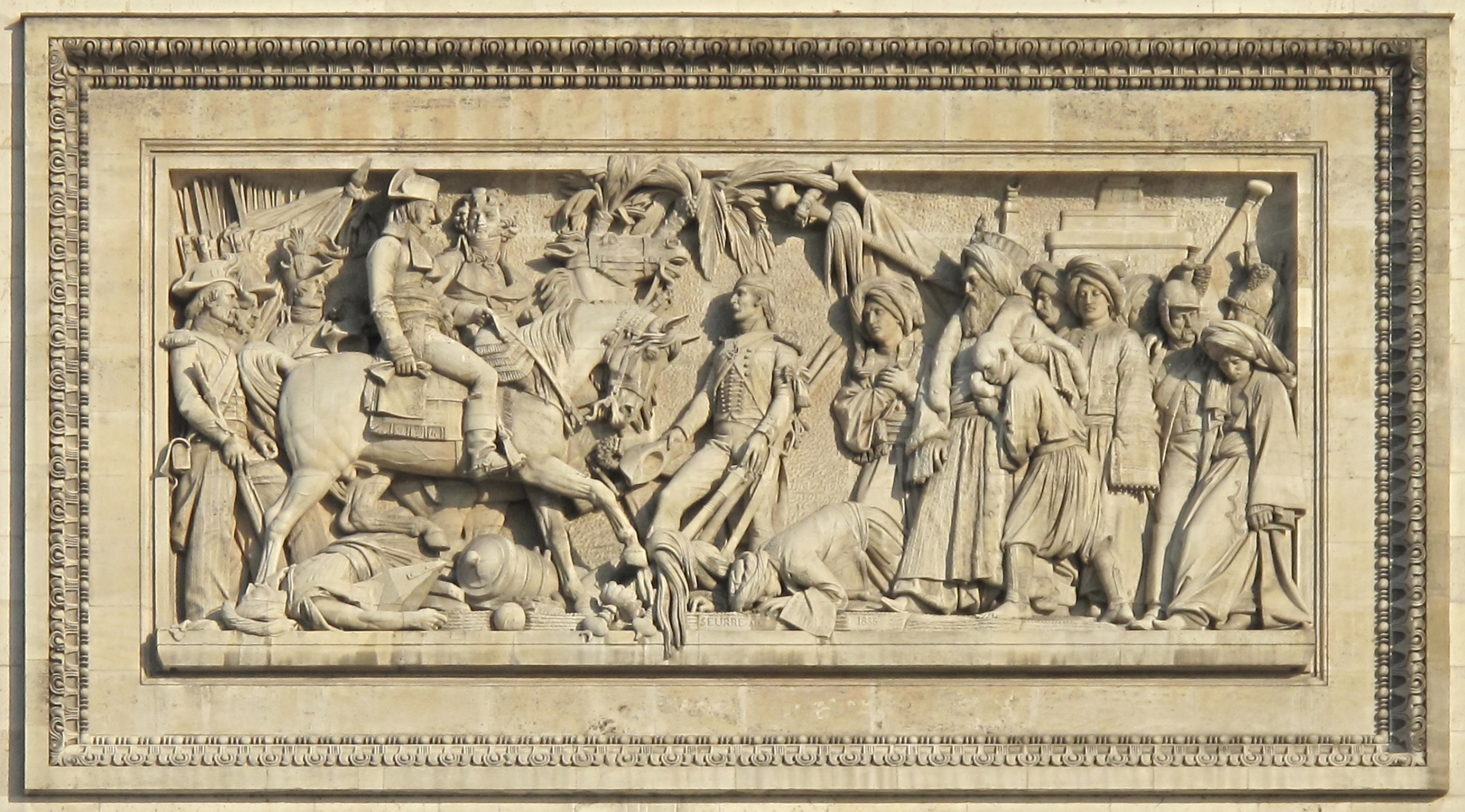
Avenue des Champs-Élysées (left): Battle of Abukir.

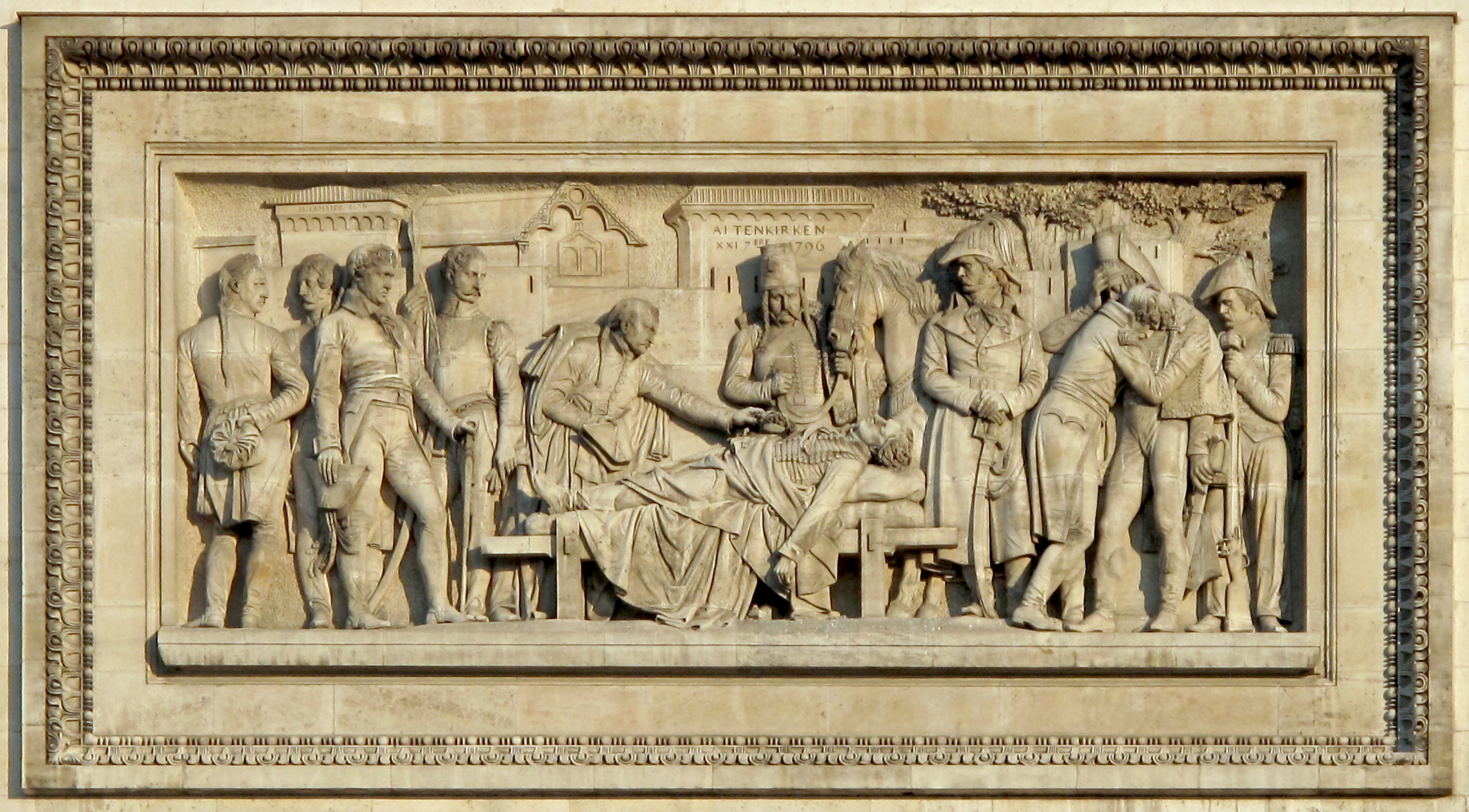
Avenue des Champs-Élysées (right): Funeral of General Marceau.

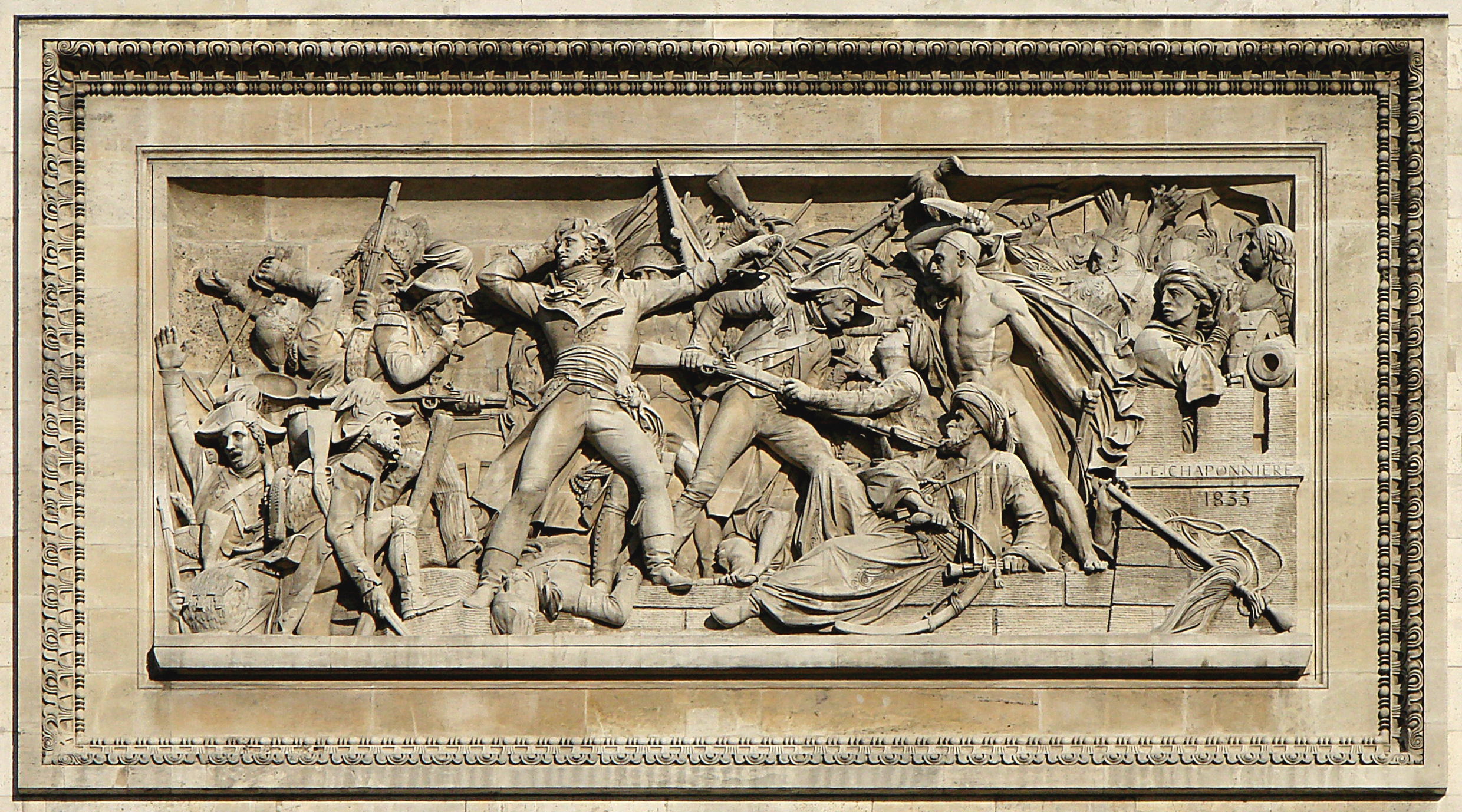
Avenue de la Grande Armée (left): Capture of Alexandria.

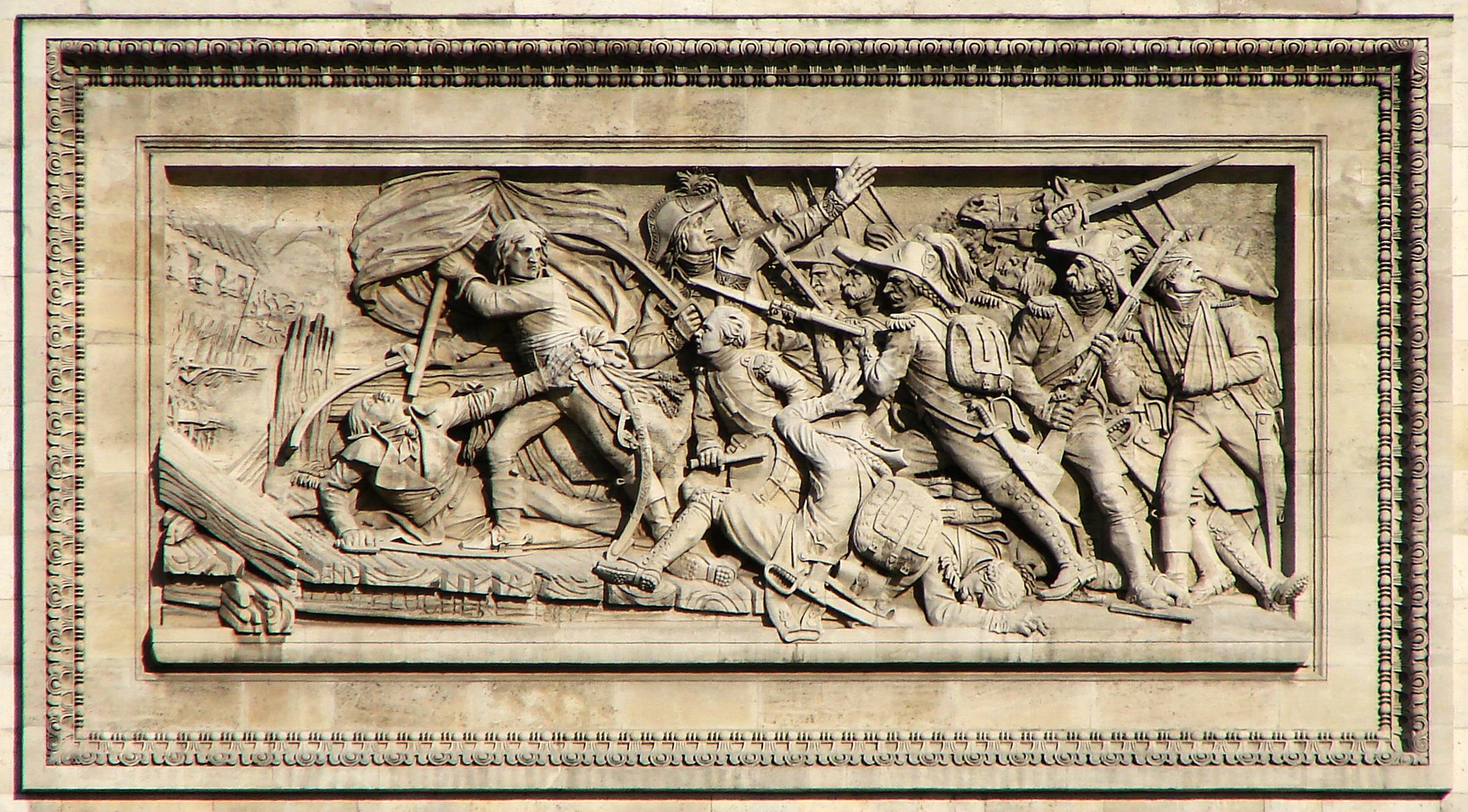
Avenue de la Grande Armée (right): Battle of Arcole.
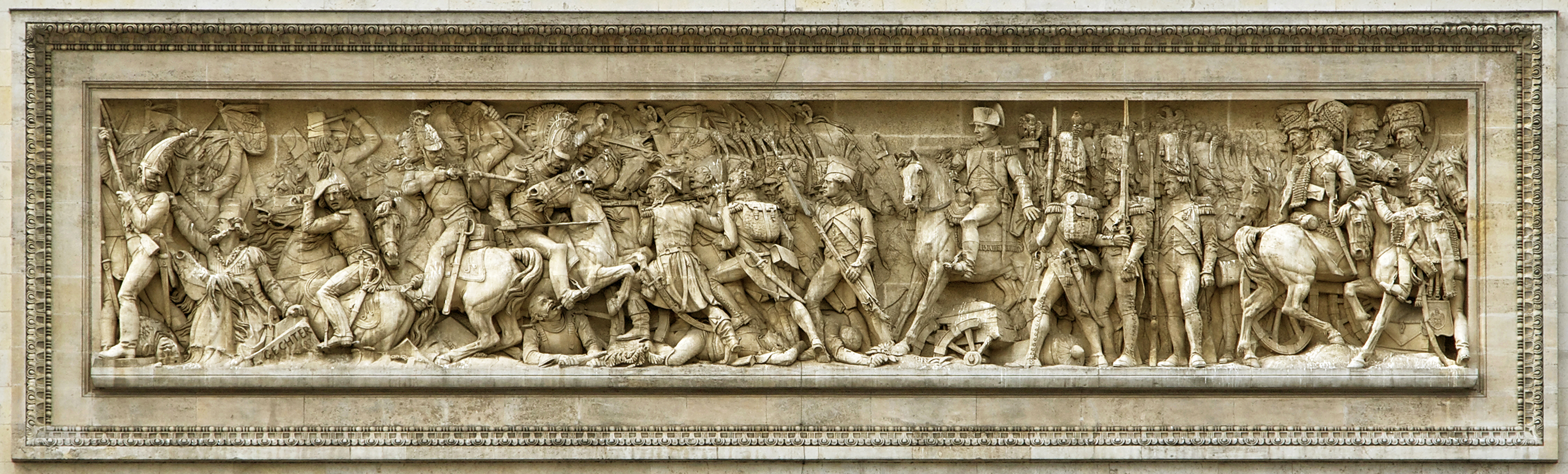
Avenue de Wagram: Battle of Austerlitz.

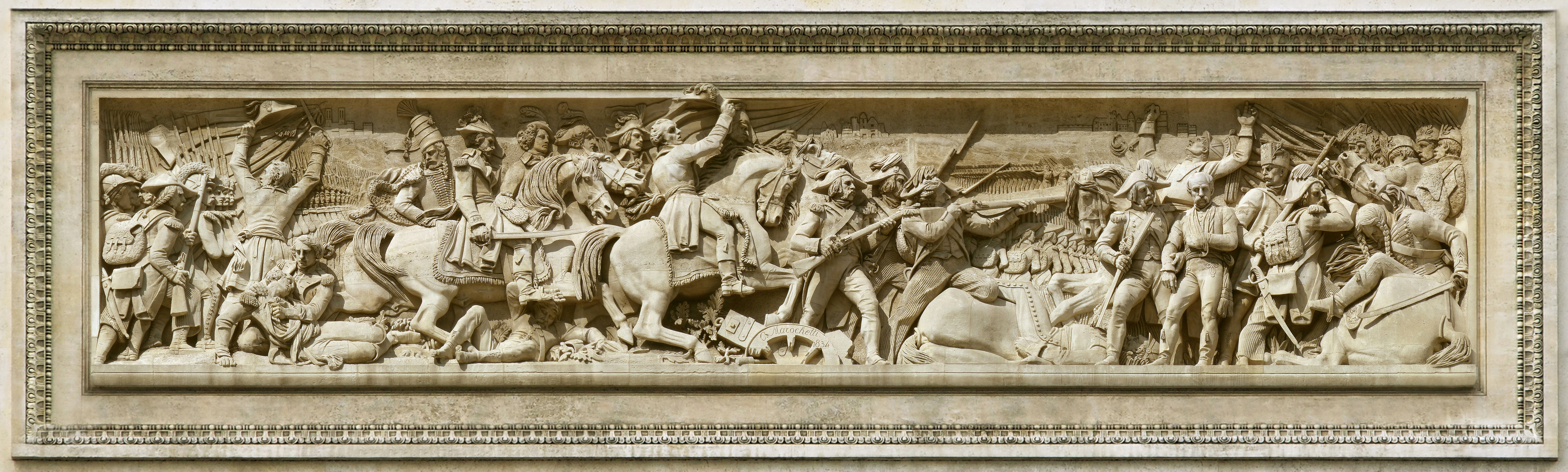
Avenue Kléber: Battle of Jemappes.

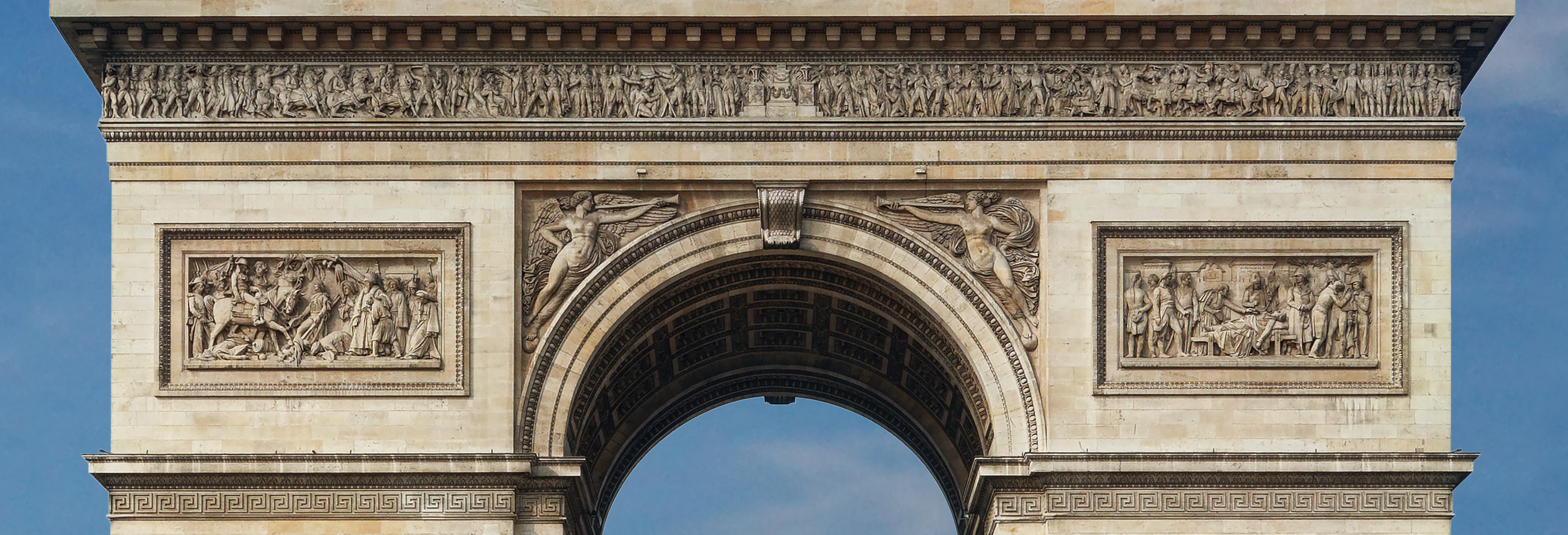
Outer low reliefs, representing the Battle of Abukir (left) and the funeral of General Marceau (right), on the southern façade of the Arc de Triomphe (Avenue des Champs-Élysées).

The names of the 5 battles represented in low relief on the outer façades

Left low relief	Avenue des Champs-Élysées	Right low relief
ABOUKIR		MARCEAU
	•
	Avenue de Wagram
	AUSTERLITZ
	•
Left low relief	Avenue de la Grande Armée	Right low relief
ALEXANDRIE		ARCOLE
	•
	Avenue Kléber
	JEMMAPES
	•

== See also ==
- Names inscribed on the Arc de Triomphe
- French Revolutionary Wars
- Napoleonic Wars
- Lists of battles of the French Revolutionary and Napoleonic Wars
