= Huy (High Priest of Ptah) =

Ancient Egyptian high priest

- High Priest of Ptah in Memphis
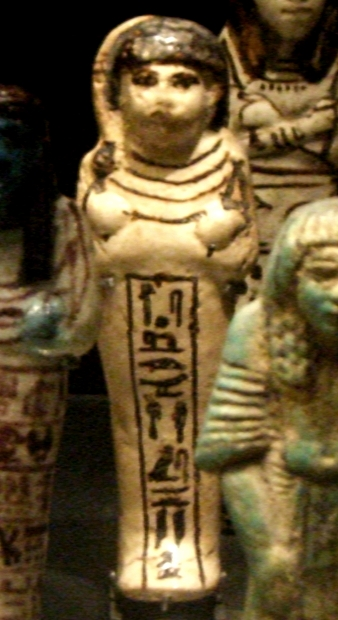
- Ushabti of Huy (Musée du Louvre)
- Successor: Pahemnetjer
- Dynasty: 19th Dynasty
- Pharaoh: Ramesses II
- Burial: Saqqara?

Huy was a High Priest of Ptah during the reign of Ramesses II. He is known from two shabtis (now in the Louvre) dedicated at an Apis burial in the Serapeum of Saqqara. The Apis burials are dated to years 16 and 30. Huy may have served as High priest of Ptah from approximately year 2 to year 20 of the reign of Ramesses II. Huy was succeeded by Pahemnetjer.

== In popular culture ==
- One of the advisors to Pharaoh in The Prince of Egypt (1998) is named Huy.
