= Pahemnetjer =

Ancient Egyptian high priest of Ptah

- High Priest of Ptah in Memphis
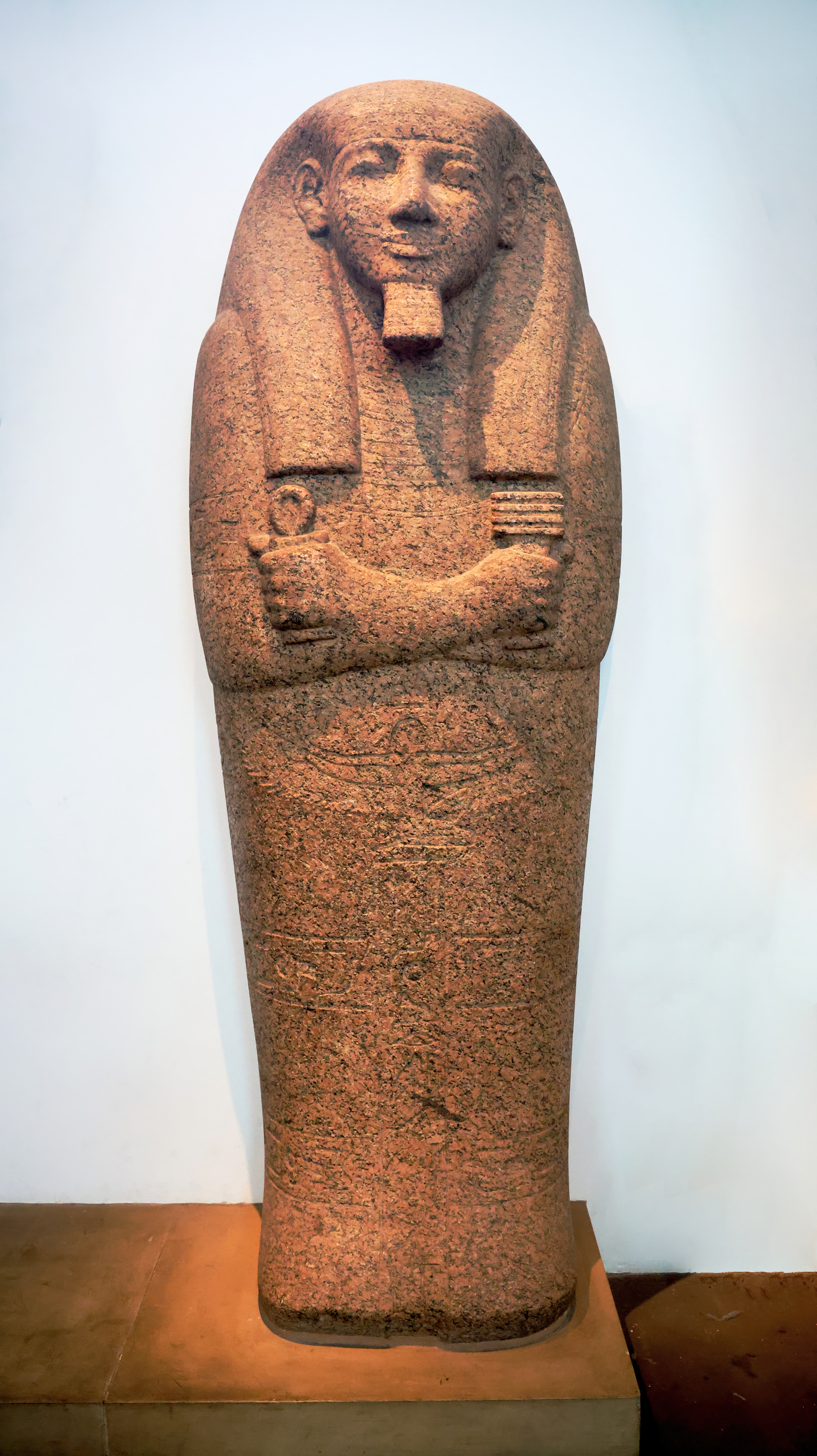
- Granite sarcophagus of Pahemnetjer in the British Museum (EA 18).
Egyptian name
pA A Hm nTr
- Predecessor: Huy
- Dynasty: 19th Dynasty
- Pharaoh: Ramesses II
- Burial: Saqqara?
- Spouse: Huneroy
- Father: Mahu
- Mother: Nena
- Children: Didia and Prehotep II

Pahemnetjer (p3-ḥm-nṯr; "servant of the god", "priest") was a High Priest of Ptah during the reign of Ramesses II. Pahemnetjer succeeded Huy as High Priest of Ptah and was in turn succeeded by his son Didia.

== Biography ==
Pahemnetjer was the son of a dignitary named Mahu according to a block from Florence. He was married to a lady named Huneroy, and he was the father of both Didia and Prehotep II.

Pahemnetjer held a vast array of titles: noble and count, Sole companion who is loved, the Sem-priest and Chief Directing Crafts (= High priest of Ptah), Chief of secrets in the Temples, who sees the secrets of all the gods. On his sarcophagus and inner coffin Pahemnetjer is also described as born of Geb, Ruler of Both Lands and the revered one before Thoth.

The sarcophagus of Pahemnetjer is in the British Museum. The location of his tomb is not known however, but it is presumed to be in Saqqara.

== Attestations ==
Pahemnetjer is attested in/on:

- A statue in a naos frame originally from Saqqara, now in the Cairo Museum (JdE 89046).
- A red granite sarcophagus now in the British Museum (BM 18).
- A sarcophagus, now in Berlin (Berlin 33).
- A wall fragment (Cairo TN 29/6/24/12).
- A wall fragment now in Stockholm (National Museum Inv 54).
- A pillar, now in Florence (No. 2607). Pahemnetjer is shown adoring Sekhmet. The inscription identifies him as a son of Mehu and born of the Lady of the House Nena.
- A black granite statue in the Cairo Museum (CG 1087); Pahemnetjer has the titles Greatest of the directors of craftsmen, etc.
- A statue of his son: Rahotep, Governor of the Town and Vizier, etc., son of Pahemnetjer, Greatest of the directors of craftsmen of Ptah, Brit. Mus. EA 712.
