= Didia =

Egyptian high priest

- High Priest of Ptah in Memphis
Egyptian name
D37 D37 M17 G1 A1
- Predecessor: Pahemnetjer
- Successor: Khaemwaset
- Dynasty: 19th Dynasty
- Pharaoh: Ramesses II
- Burial: Saqqara?
- Father: Pahemnetjer
- Mother: Huneroy

Didia was High Priest of Ptah during the reign of Ramesses II. Didia succeeded his father Pahemnetjer into the office of High Priest of Ptah.

Didia likely became High Priest of Ptah in the 35th year of Ramesses II. Didia held the office of high priest for some fifteen years. He was eventually succeeded by Prince Khaemwaset in about year 50 of Ramesses II.

Didia is attested in an inscription on a stela (BM 183) showing several High Priests of Ptah. The stela shows the High Priests of Ptah Pahemnetjer, Didia, the Vizier Prehotep (Didia's brother), an official named Meryti and the troop Commander Pay, as well as four women named Tyti, Sheritre, Mutnofret and Setmenti. The stela is dedicated by Huneroy (probably the wife of Pahemnetjer and mother of Rahotep and Didia).
