= Prehotep II =

Ancient Egyptian Vizier

- Vizier of the North
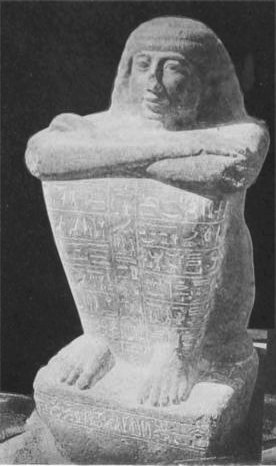
- Block statue of vizier Prehotep, from Abydos
Egyptian name
G40 N5 Z1 Htp t p
- Successor: Prehotep I (Vizier)
- Dynasty: 19th Dynasty
- Pharaoh: Ramesses II
- Burial: Sedment
- Spouse: Huneroy
- Father: Pahemnetjer
- Mother: Huneroy
- Children: Mery, Deputy of the House of Life

The ancient Egyptian noble Prehotep II (also known as Rahotep, Parahotep, Prehotep the Younger, Parehotp) was Vizier in the latter part of the reign of Ramesses II, during the 19th Dynasty.

== Family ==
Parahotep was the son of the High Priest of Ptah Pahemnetjer and his wife Huneroy. Parahotep had an older brother named Didia who also served as a High Priest of Ptah. A seated statue, now in the British Museum (BM712), depicts the vizier (Pa)Rahotep and on the seat his son Mery, Deputy of the House of Life, his wife Huneroy, who is a chief of the harem of Herishef and his mother-in-law Buia named Khat'nesu are mentioned. Prehotep's wife Huneroy was the daughter of the High Priest of Anhur, named Minmose.

== Life ==
Prehotep's father Pahemnetjer became High Priest of Ptah about year 20 of Ramesses II (ca. 1259 BC). Prehotep may have still been young at that time. It seems that by about year 35 (ca. 1244 BC) – after being in office for 15 years – Pahemnetjer died or at least stepped down as high priest. That position went to Prehotep's elder brother Didia. In year 45 (ca. 1233 BC) Didia is no longer High Priest of Ptah, but the priestly appointment does not go to Prehotep. It is Khaemwaset, the son of Ramesses II who takes on that role in Memphis, Egypt. About 5 years later (ca. 1228 BC) Prehotep is appointed as Northern Vizier. At the same time Neferronpet is Vizier of the South and between the two of them these men head the civil administration of Egypt.

In year 55 (ca. 1223 BC), Khaemwaset dies and following in the footsteps of his father and older brother Prehotep becomes High Priest of Ptah in Memphis, Egypt. Prehotep also takes on the position of High Priest of Ra in Heliopolis. That position he seems to have taken over after the death of prince Meryatum, the son of Ramesses II and Nefertari, who had been in office for almost 20 years. Prehotep held the positions of vizier and high priest of Ptah and Ra until the end of the reign of Ramesses II, thereby serving as vizier for at least 17 years and as high priest for at least 12 years.

== Identity with Prehotep I ==
There is not yet any full agreement in Egyptology whether there were two or just one viziers with the name Prehotep. Indeed, some scholars regard Prehotep I and Prehotep II as one person, others as two. When Flinders Petrie excavated the tomb of Prehotep at Sedment, he found two sarcophagi in the burial chamber and distinguished between Prehotep and Rehotep. However, the second, not well preserved sarcophagus belonged to the wife of the vizier named Huneroy (Hel). Wolfgang Helck saw two viziers with these slightly different names. However, Cerny in a review of Helck's book draw attention to a scribe at Deir -el-Medina with the same name who appears sometimes as Prehotep, sometimes as Rehotep and concluded that there is only one vizier with the name Prehotep and the variation of the name Rehotep. De Meulenaere saw the main reason for dividing the sources onto two people in the canopic jars of Prehotep. Indeed, there are five canopic jars with his name and titles, while Egyptians in general had only four of them. It was argued that the fifth jar comes from a cenotaph of the vizier. Supporter for one vizier with that name also argue that there is only one tomb of a vizier Prehotep known and that the sources (so far about 45 objects) better fit to just one person.

- compare Prehotep I

== Monuments ==
- Stela from Qantir
- Great granite stela now in the Cairo Museum (JdE 48845)
- A naophorous kneeling statue from Saqqara.
- Stela from Memphis now in the British Museum (BM 183)
- The tomb in Sedment which has a statue group of the Vizier and his wife, a sarcophagus, a stela (Cairo JdE 47001), an offering table (Philadelphia Inv. 15413), a column, several tomb scenes and two fragmentary canopic jars.
- A stela from Abydos
- A squatting Statue from Abydos
- A votive Pot with the High Priest of Anhur, Minmose from Abydos
- Several other statues of unknown provenance
