= Sedment =

Village in Beni Suef Governorate, Egypt

Sedment al-Gabal سدمنت الجبل
- Location in Egypt
- Coordinates: 29°08′35″N 30°54′00″E
- Country: Egypt
- Governorate: Beni Suef

Population (2006)
  - Total: 13,119
- Time zone: UTC+2 (EET)
  - Summer (DST): UTC+3 (EEST)

Sedment al-Gabal (Arabic: سدمنت الجبل) is a village in the Beni Suef Governorate of Egypt. It attracts a large number of Christians each year to celebrate the feast day of Saint George.

== Etymology ==
The Arabic name of the village comes from its Coptic name pi-Sotoment (Coptic: ⲡⲓⲥⲟⲧⲟⲙⲉⲛⲧ), which is probably related to the word "west" (Coptic: ⲉⲙⲉⲛⲧ).

== History ==
The village is mentioned in the connection with the events described in the Coptic martyrdom of Apa Ioule and Pteleme, according to which account, during the reign of Diocletian, it was one of the places where the edict against Christians was enforced. Comes, a Roman official, established his judgment seat here, leading to the martyrdom of Apa Ioule. The narrative indicates the existence of a Christian community in Sedment as early as the 4th century.

In medieval times, Sedment was referenced in historical documents, such as Arabic papyrus records from the 8th century, that mentions the village in the context of ship freight transportation. These records also show that the Nubians settled in the village. The medieval lists of Egyptian churches and monasteries mentions the existence of a Church of Saint George in Sedment, which is still intact.

In the 11th century, Sedment was associated with monastic life. The Armenian monk Peter, also known by the name al-Sedmenti, spent his early years as a monk at St. George's Monastery, located near Sedment. This suggests that the Christian community in Sedment maintained its vitality well into the medieval period. By the time of al-Maqrizi, St. George's Monastery in Sedment had lost much of its former importance and was partially abandoned.

In the early 20th century, two Coptic monks undertook the renovation of the old monastery complex in Sedment. They also constructed a new St. George's Church.

== Archaeology ==
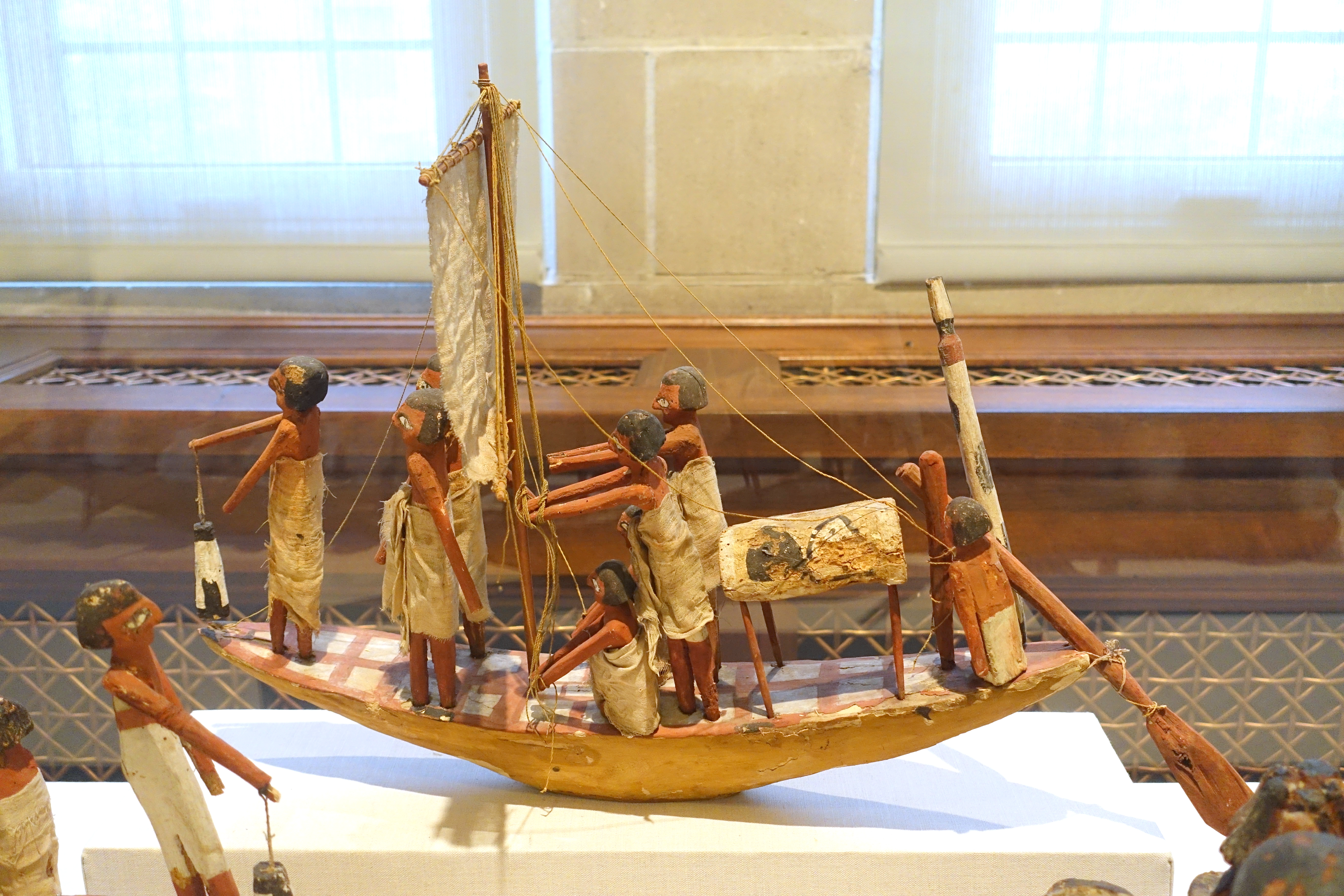
Model boat from a tomb in Sedment, First Intermediate Period. Oriental Institute, Chicago.

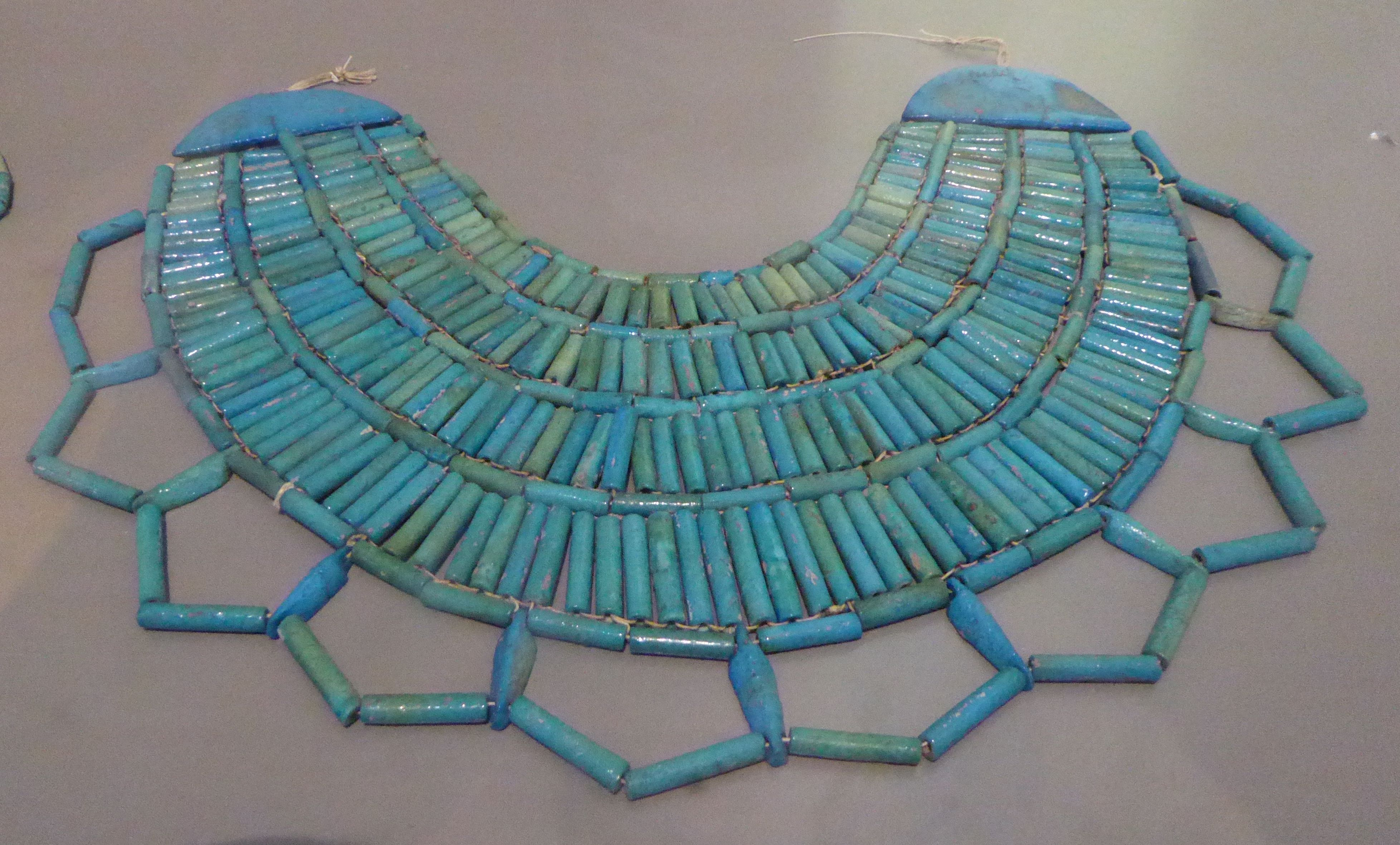
First Intermediate Period faience collar found in Sedment.

In Egyptology it is mainly known for a series of cemeteries excavated near this village. The cemeteries were the target of several expeditions, the most substantial one under Flinders Petrie and Guy Brunton. Their work was published in two volumes. They found several hundred burials dating from around 3000 BC to the New Kingdom. Especially many burials were found dating to the First Intermediate Period and New Kingdom. The First Intermediate Period burials contained several inscribed coffins, but also many burials with wooden models. The New Kingdom burials were found much looted, but some reliefs found demonstrate that several tombs were adorned with a relief–decorated chapel above ground. The largest tomb was that of the vizier Prehotep, who was in office under king Ramses II.
