= 回家 =

回家 meaning "come home", "come back home" or "go home", etc.

It may refer to:

- "Back" (回家), an EP by Hong Kong singer Karen Mok
- Come Back Home (回家), an album by Taiwanese singer Jacklyn Wu
- "Going Home" (回家), a song by Hong Kong-Taiwanese singer Dave Wang
- Home (回家), a 2011 Taiwanese television series starring Janine Chang and Vic Chou, etc.
- Home Truly (回家), a Singaporean drama

== See also ==
- Come Back Home (disambiguation)
- Come Home (disambiguation)
- Come On Home (disambiguation)
- Coming Home (disambiguation)
- Going Home (disambiguation)
- Homegoing (disambiguation)
- I'm Going Home (disambiguation)
- 愛回家 (disambiguation)
