= Coming Home =

Coming Home or Comin' Home may refer to:

== Film ==
- Coming Home (1962 film), a South Korean film starring Choi Moo-ryong
- Coming Home (1978 film), an American film directed by Hal Ashby
- Coming Home (2011 film), a film featuring Ankur Bhatia
- Coming Home (2012 film), a French film directed by Frédéric Videau
- Coming Home (2014 film), a Chinese film directed by Zhang Yimou
- Coming Home (2018 film), an Argentine film directed and written by Ricardo Preve
- Coming Home (2020 film), a Philippine drama

== Literature ==
- Coming Home (Cohen novel), 1945, by Lester Cohen
- Coming Home (McDevitt novel), 2014 science-fiction novel by Jack McDevitt
- Coming Home, 1995 novel by Rosamunde Pilcher
- Coming Home, 2009 play by Athol Fugard

== Music ==
=== Albums ===
- Coming Home (Aleksander With album), 2006
- Coming Home (Leon Bridges album), 2015
- Coming Home (Kristin Chenoweth album), 2014
- Coming Home (Raymond Cilliers album), 2016
- Coming Home (Falling in Reverse album), 2017
- Comin' Home (Larry Coryell album), 1984
- Coming Home (Yungchen Lhamo album), 1998
- Coming Home (Lonestar album), 2005
- Coming Home (The Nadas album), 2000
- Coming Home (New Found Glory album), 2006
- Coming Home (O'Connor Band album), 2016
- Coming Home (Pain album), 2016
- Coming Home (Lionel Richie album), 2006
- Coming Home (The Soldiers album), 2009
- Coming Home (Usher album), 2024
- Coming Home (Faye Wong album), 1992
- Coming Home (EP), 1998, by Iron Savior
- Comin' Home (EP), 2014, by Jessie James Decker
- Coming Home, 2010 album by Boozoo Bajou
- Coming Home, 2009 album by Nightmares on Wax
- Coming Home, 2008 album by Danny Wood
- Coming Home, 1998 album by Joe Grushecky

=== Songs ===
- "Coming Home" (Alex Lloyd song), 2003; re-released in 2014 as "Coming Home (To Richmond)"
- "Coming Home" (Busted song), 2016
- "Coming Home" (Cinderella song), 1989
- "Coming Home" (Diddy – Dirty Money song), 2010
- "Coming Home" (Firelight song), 2014
- "Coming Home" (Kaiser Chiefs song), 2014
- "Coming Home" (Keith Urban song), 2018
- "Coming Home" (K-Warren song), 2001
- "Coming Home" (Lemar song), 2010
- "Coming Home" (Leon Bridges song), 2015
- "Coming Home" (Sasha song), 2006
- "Coming Home" (Sjonni's Friends song), 2011
- "Coming Home" (The Soldiers song), 2009
- "Coming Home" (Sigma and Rita Ora song), 2015
- "Coming Home" (Sheppard song), 2017
- "Comin' Home" (City and Colour song), 2006
- "Comin' Home" (Hum song), 1998
- "Comin' Home" (The Radiators song), 1979
- "Coming Home (Jeanny Part 2)" by Falco, 1986
- "Major Tom (Coming Home)", by Peter Schilling
- "Coming Home", by Alex Band from Alex Band EP
- "Coming Home", by Alter Bridge from Blackbird
- "Coming Home", by Aly & Fila featuring Jwaydan
- "Coming Home", by Armin van Buuren from Mirage
- "Coming Home", by Avenged Sevenfold from Hail to the King
- "Coming Home", by Axel Rudi Pell from Shadow Zone
- "Coming Home", by Beabadoobee from This Is How Tomorrow Moves
- "Coming Home", by DJ Tiësto from Parade of the Athletes
- "Coming Home", by Ian Thomas from Still Here
- "Coming Home", by Enrique Iglesias from Euphoria
- "Coming Home", by Eric Saade
- "Coming Home", by Gwyneth Paltrow from the Country Strong film soundtrack, 2010
- "Coming Home", by Iron Maiden from The Final Frontier
- "Coming Home", by Iron Savior from Unification
- "Coming Home", by James LaBrie from Static Impulse
- "Coming Home", by John Legend from Once Again
- "Coming Home", by King Diamond from Them
- "Coming Home", by Little Richard from Pray Along with Little Richard
- "Coming Home", by Marit Larsen from Spark
- "Coming Home", by The Mavis's from Rapture
- "Coming Home", by Megadeth from The World Needs a Hero
- "Coming Home", by Pain from Coming Home
- "Coming Home", by Pixie Lott from Turn It Up Louder
- "Coming Home", by Saxon from Killing Ground
- "Coming Home", by Scorpions from Love at First Sting
- "Coming Home", by Shane Filan of Westlife from You and Me
- "Coming Home", by Stratovarius from Visions
- "Coming Home", by SWV from It's About Time
- "Coming Home", by U.D.O. from Animal House
- "Comin' Home", by Bob Seger from The Distance
- "Comin' Home", by Cheeseburger
- "Comin' Home", by Danger Danger from Screw It!
- "Comin' Home", by Delaney & Bonnie from On Tour with Eric Clapton
- "Comin' Home", by Deep Purple from Come Taste the Band
- "Comin' Home", by Kiss from Hotter Than Hell
- "Comin' Home", by Lynyrd Skynyrd from The Essential Lynyrd Skynyrd
- "Comin' Home", by Prism from Armageddon
- "Comin' Home", by Talisman from Genesis

== Television ==
=== Episodes ===
- "Coming Home" (Dawson's Creek)
- "Coming Home" (The Dead Zone)
- "Coming Home" (Desperate Housewives)
- "Coming Home" (Mobile Suit Gundam)
- "Coming Home" (Xena: Warrior Princess)

=== Other uses in television ===
- Coming Home (TV serial), a two-part 1998 British serial based on Rosamund Pilcher's novel that aired on ITV
- Coming Home (British TV series), a 2004 British documentary series that aired on BBC Wales
- Coming Home (American TV series), a 2011 American reality series that aired on Lifetime
- Coming Home (miniseries), a 2003 miniseries produced by John Drimmer
- "Coming Home" (advertisement), or the "Folgers Incest Ad", a 2009 commercial for Folgers Coffee

== Other uses ==
- Coming Home campaign, a UK program to aid military personnel returning from Afghanistan and Iraq

== See also ==
- Homecoming (disambiguation)
- Come Home (disambiguation)
- Going Home (disambiguation)
- I'm Coming Home (disambiguation)
