= A Soldier's Christmas Letter =

Single by The Soldiers

from the album Coming Home
- B-side: "-"
- Released: 4 December 2009
- Recorded: 2009
- Genre: Pop
- Length: 3:30
- Label: Warner Bros.
- Songwriter(s): Jake Hook Nick Patrick Jeff Chegwin

The Soldier's singles chronology
| "Coming Home" (2009) | "A Soldier's Christmas Letter" (2009) | "Letters Home" (2010) |

"A Soldier's Christmas Letter" is a song performed by British pop singers The Soldiers from their debut studio album Coming Home. It was released on 4 December 2009 serving as the album's second single. It peaked at number 65 on the UK Singles Chart.

== Music video ==
A music video to accompany the release of "A Soldier's Christmas Letter" was first released onto YouTube on 24 November 2009 at a total length of three minutes and forty-one seconds.

== Track listing ==
Digital download

1. "A Soldier's Christmas Letter" – 3:30

== Chart performance ==
| Chart (2009) | Peak position |
|---|---|
| UK Singles (The Official Charts Company) | 65 |

== Release history ==
| Region | Date | Format | Label |
|---|---|---|---|
| United Kingdom | 4 December 2009 | Digital Download | Warner Bros. Records |
