= Comeback =

Comeback, The Comeback or Come Back may refer to:

== General ==
- Comeback (publicity), a return to prominence by a well-known person
- Comeback (retort), a witty response to an insult or criticism
- Comeback (sports), an event where an athlete or team losing a contest by a wide margin ultimately prevails
  - The Comeback (American football), a 1993 NFL playoff game between the Buffalo Bills and the Houston Oilers
- Comeback (sheep), a breed of domestic sheep
- Comeback sauce, a dipping sauce for fried foods or as a salad dressing in the cuisine of central Mississippi
- The Comeback Seattle, a defunct gay bar in Seattle, Washington, U.S.

== Film ==
- Come-Back!, a 1981 Dutch film
- Comeback (1982 film), a film starring Eric Burdon
- Comeback (1983 film), or Love Is Forever, an American adventure film
- Comeback (2023 film), a Finnish film
- The Comeback (1978 film), a British horror film
- The Comeback (1980 film), a documentary about Arnold Schwarzenegger
- The Comeback (2001 film), an Italian drama film
- The Comeback (2010 film), aka Cabotins, a Canadian comedy film directed by Alain Desrochers
- The Comeback (2015 film), a Filipino independent comedy film by Ivan Andrew Payawal
- The Comeback (2023 film), a Chinese action film
- The Comebacks, a 2007 American comedy film

== Music ==
- Comeback (K-pop), a Korean pop music marketing term for promotions of an artist's single or album that is not their debut

=== Albums ===
- Comeback (Eric Burdon album), 1982
- Comeback (Tic Tac Toe album), 2006
- The Comeback (Zac Brown Band album), 2021
- The Comeback (EP), by Stars, 2001
- Comeback: Single Collection '90–'94, by Bonnie Tyler, 1994
- The Comeback, by Baby Rasta & Gringo, 2008

=== Songs ===
- "Come Back" (Chicane song), 2010
- "Come Back" (Jessica Garlick song), 2002
- "Come Back" (The J. Geils Band song), 1980
- "Come Back" (Johnny Mathis song), 1963
- "Comeback" (Ella Eyre song), 2014
- "Comeback" (Grinspoon song), 2009
- "The Comeback" (song), by Danny Gokey, 2017
- "Come Back", by Algebra from Purpose
- "Come Back", by Bananarama from Wow!
- "Come Back", by Ben Platt from Reverie
- "Come Back", by Depeche Mode from Sounds of the Universe
- "Come Back", by Foo Fighters from One by One
- "Come Back", by iamnot
- "Come Back", by Lazlo Bane from Back Sides
- "Come Back", by The Mighty Wah!
- "Come Back", by Pearl Jam from Pearl Jam
- "Come Back", by Usher featuring Jermaine Dupri from My Way
- "Come Back (Before You Leave)", by Roxette from Tourism
- "Comeback", by Eric Burdon from Power Company
- "Comeback", by Jonas Brothers from Happiness Begins
- "Comeback", by Kelly Rowland from Ms. Kelly
- "Comeback", by Carly Rae Jepsen featuring Bleachers from Dedicated Side B
- "The Comeback", by Big Pooh from The Delightful Bars
- "The Comeback", by Gomez from Bring It On
- "The Comeback", by Joe Williams from Count Basie Swings, Joe Williams Sings
- "The Comeback", by Shout Out Louds from Howl Howl Gaff Gaff

== Television ==
- Comeback (TV series), a Czech sitcom
- The Comeback (TV series), a series produced by HBO
- The Comeback, a 1997 TV series produced by Asia Television
- "The Comeback" (Seinfeld), a 1997 episode of Seinfeld
- "Comeback" (Glee), a 2011 episode of Glee
- "Comeback" (Land of the Giants), a 1969 episode of Land of the Giants

== Literature ==
- The Comeback (novel), a 1985 novel by Ed Vega
- The Comeback (play), a 2020 comedy by Ben Ashenden and Alex Owen of the double act The Pin
- The Comeback, a play by A. R. Gurney

== See also ==
- Come Back Home (disambiguation)
- Comeback Kid (disambiguation)
- Come Back, Little Sheba (disambiguation)
- Comeback season (disambiguation)
