= Back Home =

Back Home may refer to:

== Albums ==
- Back Home (Bearfoot Bluegrass album), 2003
- Back Home (Caedmon's Call album), 2003
- Back Home (Chuck Berry album), 1970
- Back Home (Eric Clapton album), 2005
- Back Home (Merle Travis album), 1957
- Back Home (Phineas Newborn Jr. album), recorded 1976, released 1985
- Back Home (Trey Songz album) or the title song, 2020
- Back Home (Warne Marsh album), 1986
- Back Home (Westlife album), 2007
  - Back Home Tour, tour by Westlife in support of the album

== Songs ==
- "Back Home" (song), by the 1970 England World Cup football squad
- "Back Home", by Andy Grammer from Magazines or Novels, 2014
- "Back Home", by ASAP Rocky from At. Long. Last. ASAP, 2015
- "Back Home", by the Beach Boys from 15 Big Ones, 1976
- "Back Home", by the Bee Gees from 2 Years On, 1970
- "Back Home", by Booker T. & the M.G.'s from Melting Pot, 1971
- "Back Home", by Brothers Osborne from Brothers Osborne, 2023
- "Back Home", by Caribou from Our Love, 2014
- "Back Home", by Fort Minor from The Rising Tied, 2005
- "Back Home", by Golden Earring from Golden Earring, 1970
- "Back Home", by Graham Nash from This Path Tonight, 2016
- "Back Home", by Juice Wrld, 2018
- "Back Home", by Owl City from Mobile Orchestra, 2015
- "Back Home", by Reks from The Greatest X, 2016
- "Back Home", by Yeat from Afterlyfe, 2023
- "Back Home", by Yeat and Joji from ADL, 2026
- "Back Home", by Yellowcard from Ocean Avenue, 2003

== Other uses ==
- Back Home (novel), a 1984 novel by Michelle Magorian, twice adapted for television
- Back Home (Pinkney book), a children's picture book by Gloria Jean Pinkney, illustrated by Jerry Pinkney
- Back Home (1989 film), a film starring Hayley Mills
- Back Home (2019 film), a French drama film

== See also ==
- Back Home Again (disambiguation)
- Come Back Home (disambiguation)
- Back to Home, a 2019 Taiwanese television series
