= Jake Hook =

English songwriter & producer

- Born: Camden, London, England
- Occupations: Songwriter; music producer; arranger; Singer
- Instruments: Vocals, piano, guitar, drums and flute
- Years active: 2004–present
- Label: EMI Warner Music Atlantic Records Sony Music Entertainment Cherry Red Spekulation Entertainment LBM Records
- Website: www.jakehook.com

Jake Patrick Robert Hook is an English, million-seller songwriter, producer and arranger. Hook signed with EMI, in December 2009, on the strength of the single "Coming Home" by The Soldiers.

== Origins ==
Jake Hook was born in the London Borough of Camden, and raised with his younger brother in Southgate, North London, by his Irish Catholic mother and English Protestant father. At age eight, he attended the Chickenshed Theatre. Inheriting his great grandmother's piano had inspired him to learn to play.

Hook has dyslexia, making him unable to read sheet music. He learned to play the piano by lying underneath the theatre's baby grand piano, memorising how chords were formed and sounded until he could play tunes in his head. Hook also plays flute, drums and acoustic guitar. He has participated in four London musicals.

Hook appeared in BBC drama The Biz, and sang backup for Meat Loaf. He appeared in the Top 15 hit "I'm in Love with the World" in 1997. Hook attended Middlesex University. His musical influences include Janet Jackson, George Michael and Peter Gabriel

== Music career ==
=== Singer-songwriter ===
Hook self-funded his debut album of seventeen original songs, Record on the Blag in 2004. The entire album was completely 'Blagged' (got for free). The music video for the first single "Smooth" (recorded at Elstree Film Studios), a documentary about Jake, the studio time, and all the musicians were also 'blagged'.

Hook performed alongside Jamelia, Jenny Frost, The Cheeky Girls, Phixx and Cliff Richard during a European tour, promoting the album.

In 2006 after numerous label changes, Hook founded his own label, LBM Records, sourced with financial backing from around the world. CBBC commissioned "Seaside Day Out", a song by Hook which received 250,000 downloads in one week, on the BBC Interactive Service. He co-wrote a song for CBeebies programme Tikkabilla, with producer Francis Haines.

Hook has written a part-autobiographical album The Butterfly Observations, dubbed the 'torch song' album of the new age, which is still in production. "Elusive You" from the album was released and charted in several territories.

Hook turned his hand at producing with the DoubleH remix of sixties icon Beryl Marsden's single "Baby It's You".

=== Performer ===
In 2007, Hook took to the road on a mini tour with Fame Academy winner David Sneddon. He released Live Sessions EP with songs "Fireflies, Waterfalls, Elusive You" and "Snowglobes". He was featured as artist of the week by 7digital indiestore:

"In the final instalment, comes perhaps our favourite. Veering from Eighties funkatering ('Elusive You') to gorgeous gas mark 9 balladeering ('FireFlies') without batting an eye, it is all utterly marvellous stuff."

In June 1997, the singles "Wanna" and "SXY" tracks include Crave, Sunsets, In Flagrante, Satisfied? Wanna, Silent Whispers and Purple Sky was released with much success. Hook continued to write songs of different styles and genres. In 2008 & 2009, Hook could be found gigging in various London venues. He supported Billy Ocean at the Royal Lancaster Hotel, at a prestigious charity event.

=== Songwriter ===
Hook began working with other songwriters in late 2008. A song written by one of these partnerships brought Hook to the attention of seven-time Classical Brit award-winning producer Nick Patrick (Russell Watson & Katherine Jenkins). Hook was asked to pen a song for a new band, The Soldiers (Warner UK). The debut single "Coming Home" co-written by Jake Hook, Nick Patrick and Jeff Chegwin, music and arrangement by Hook, produced by Patrick was released in early October. The album of the same name was released on 26 October, entered the UK album chart at number 4, later went on to sell over 600,000 copies and certified double platinum status by the British Phonographic Industry (BPI) in the UK alone. On 13 January 2010, Alan Titchmarsh (The Alan Titchmarsh Show) gave The Soldiers their double platinum disc, he later said "I enjoyed The Soldiers today, I got their album for Christmas and going double-platinum is well deserved". The second single "A Soldier's Christmas Letter" also featured on the album Coming Home was written, programmed and arranged by Hook, released on 7 December and charted in the UK Singles Chart at number 65.

Hook also programmed and vocally arranged on the Classical Brit nominated album Together by classical crossover act Blake (EMI). In 2010, Hook's work will be heard on the yet-to-be-released album Home by New Zealand's Elizabeth Marvelly (EMI). On 16 January 2010 Music Week listed Hook amongst the 'Movers, Shakers and Dead certs' – and one of EMI's signings of note in 2009, alongside JLS, Guy Chambers and Nadine Coyle.

Hook has also written for Tara McDonald, Kitty Brucknell and Rylan Clark

== Discography ==
The following are music singles or albums released by Jake Hook (as singer/songwriter/programmer or producer).

=== Singles ===
- "Smooth" (2004) No. 32 Belgium Singles Chart
- "Elusive You" (2006)
- "Wanna" (2007) #1 UK Indie Chart
- "Baby It's You" 2007 Beryl Marsden
- "Too Late" (2008) Beryl Marsden
- "Hey Santa (Bring my Baby Back)" (2008/9) No. 2 UK Indie Breakers
- "Coming Home" – The Soldiers (2009) No. 4 UK Chart
- "Unsung Hero" – Blake (2009)
- "A Soldier's Christmas Letter" – The Soldiers (2009) No. 65 UK Chart
- "Letters Home" – The Soldiers (2010)
- "Cherry Whispers" – Janice Kephart ft. Jake Hook
- "If You Can" – FourNurses (2011)
- "Coming Home" – The Diggers (2011)
- "And The Boys Go Wild" – The Tootsie Rollers (2012)
- "Unknown Soldier" (2013)- Gary Chilton from The Soldiers
- "Stay Safe, Save Lives" (2020) The Soldiers
- "Hey Santa! (Bring My Baby Back)" (2021)
- "Alexandra Hill / BattleScars" (2022)

=== Albums ===
- "Diana Princess of Wales Tribute" (1997) No. 15 Billboard Sony Music Entertainment
- Record on the Blag (2005) LBM Records
- "Cbeebies Album" (2006) [Demon Music Group]
- "Best Of, So Far" Jake Hook (2007) No. 52 iTunes Album Chart LBM Records
- Coming Home – The Soldiers (2009) No. 4 UK Album charts x2 Platinum Warner Music
- Together – Blake (2009) No. 36 UK Album Charts EMI Music
- Love Songs – The Soldiers (2010) 2.4 Million Copies Warner Music
- No Space For Air – Julie Atherton (2010) Speckulation Entertainment
- Letters Home – The Soldiers (2010) no.10 UK album charts x1 Platinum Warner Music
- Coming Home – The Soldiers (2010) US Release Atlantic Records
- Men in Scarlet – The Chelsea Pensioners (2010) no. 14 UK album charts x1 Gold Warner Music
- Father Christmas Sings – Father Christmas (2010) No. 30 Album Charts Lapland Records
- Guiding You – FourNurses (2011) No. 45 UK Album Charts Warner Music
- Home – Elizabeth Marvelly (2011) No. 6 New Zealand Album Charts EMI Music
- "Best Of, The Soldiers" The Soldiers (2011) Warner Music
- "Message To You" The Soldiers (2011) No. 11 UK Album Charts x1 Gold Demon Music Group
- "Changes" Beryl Marsden (2012) Cherry Red
- "Jubilee Anthems" Various Artists (2012) Warner Music
- "Christmas with the Soldiers" The Soldiers (2012) Demon Music Group
- "TBC" Elizabeth Marvelly (2013) Label TBC
- "Greatest Christmas Classics" (2013) Demon Music Group
- "AXELF The 2000s", (2014) Demon Music Group
- "Resurgence" Allan Clarke (singer) (2019) BMG Rights Management
- "Christmas Gold", The Soldiers (2020) Demon Music Group

=== EPs ===
- Smooth Ep (2005)
- Live Sessions (2007)
- SXY (2007)

== See also ==
- EMI artists
