= The Soldiers (album) =

Studio album by The Soldiers
- Released: 28 October 2012
- Recorded: 2012, London
- Genre: Vocal
- Label: Demon Music Group
- Producer: Nick Patrick

The Soldiers chronology
Message to You (2011)	The Soldiers (2012)

The Soldiers is the fourth album by The Soldiers. The album was released on 28 October 2012. It peaked at number 23 on the UK Albums Chart.

== Track listing ==
- Standard listing
1. "Healing Hands" – 3:57
2. "The Living Years" (feat. Mike Rutherford) – 5:37
3. "She" (with Charles Aznavour) – 3:43
4. "Mothers Pride" – 3:52
5. "I Have a Dream" – 4:58
6. "Picture of You" – 3:12
7. "It's Saturday Night" – 2:36
8. "Amazed" – 4:01
9. "With the Ones I Love" – 2:57
10. "Home" – 3:36
11. "Daniel" – 3:45
12. "How Deep Is Your Love" – 4:00
13. "Love Farewell (with the Duke of York Military School Choir) – 3:57
14. "Power of Love" – 5:15
15. "Back for Good" – 4:02
16. "Songbird (with Caroline Redman Lusher) – 3:22

== Personnel ==
- Mike Rutherford – vocals
- Charles Aznavour – vocals
- Trooper Ryan Idzi – vocals
- Sergeant Major Gary Chilton – vocals
- Sergeant Richie Maddocks – vocals

== Chart performance ==
Chart (2012)	Peak position
UK Albums Chart	23

== Release history ==
Region	Date	Format	Label
United Kingdom	28 October 2012	Digital Download	Demon Music Group
United Kingdom	28 October 2012	CD	Demon Music Group
