= Caroline Redman Lusher =

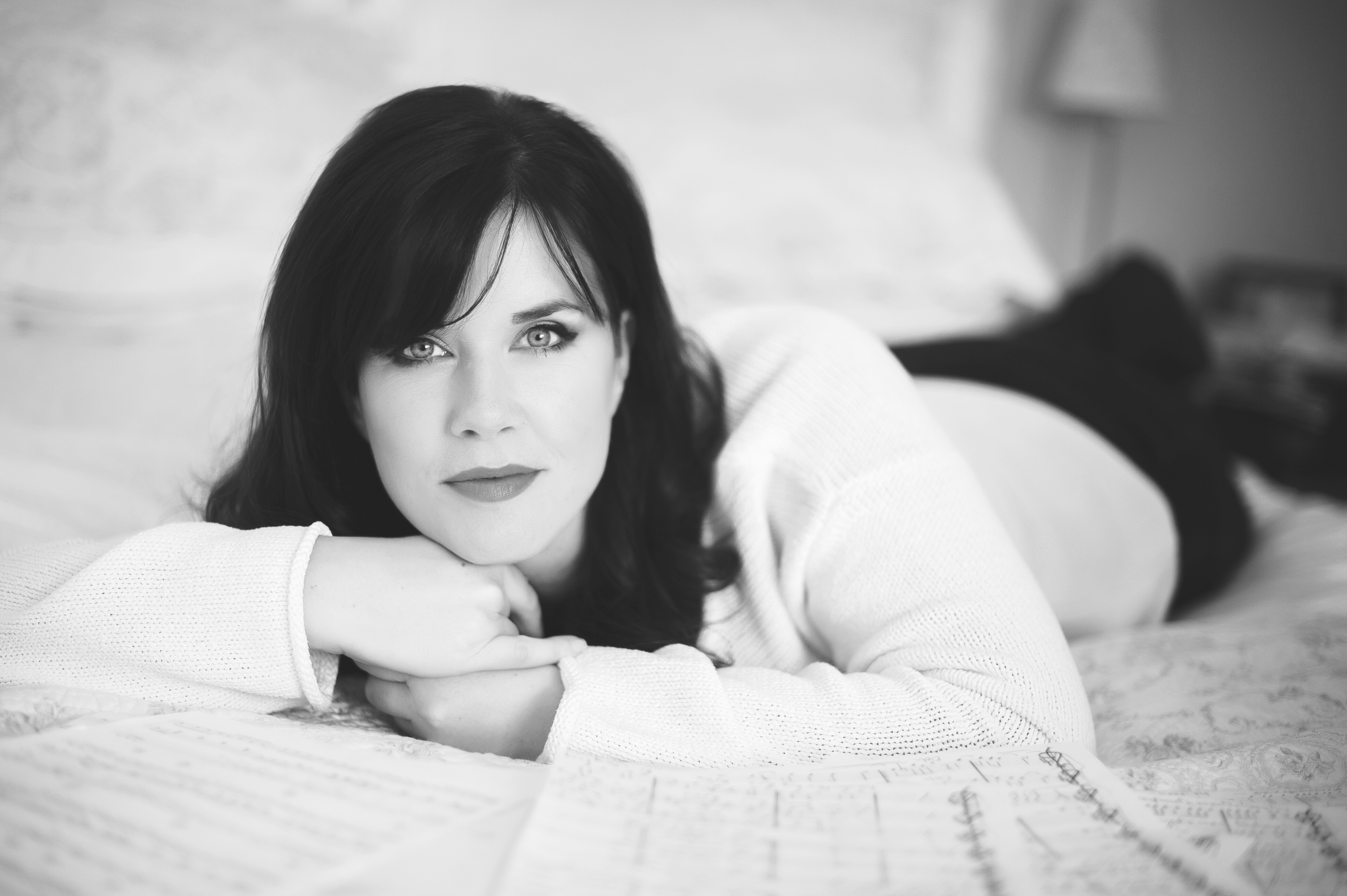

Background information
- Born: Caroline Anne Lusher; 17 April 1974 (age 52)
- Origin: Birmingham, England
- Genres: Pop, pop rock, rock, soul, gospel, Motown
- Occupations: Singer-songwriter, founder and director of Rock Choir, entrepreneur
- Instruments: Vocals, piano, violin
- Years active: 1992–present
- Website: www.carolineredmanlusher.com

Caroline Redman Lusher (born Caroline Anne Lusher, 17 April 1974) is an English singer and musician, best known for being the founder and director of Rock Choir, the world's largest amateur contemporary choir. She is considered to be "responsible for the contemporary choir movement in the UK", and "the businesswoman behind one of Britain's biggest brands". She has also enjoyed a successful career as a solo artist, performing on the Together album by vocal group Blake and several albums by The Soldiers, including Coming Home, which reached double platinum status.

Redman Lusher has gained four gold and platinum certified sales awards from the British Phonographic Industry. On 17 October 2012 Redman Lusher received the prestigious Gold Badge Award for "special contribution to Britain's music industry", from the British Academy of Songwriters, Composers and Authors (BASCA) in association with the Performing Right Society (PRS).

== Education and early career ==
Redman Lusher was a pupil at Saint Martins Independent Day School for Girls, Solihull from 1985 to 1992, winning the Christine Tucker Music Scholarship at the age of eleven. In honour of her success, St. Martins named a new Year 7 Scholarship after her in 2012, the Caroline Redman Lusher Scholarship for the Performing Arts. It was awarded for the first time in 2013. Redman Lusher went on to Salford University, where she gained a degree in popular music and recording. Redman Lusher started performing professionally at the age of 15. She worked in London's West End as a singer, entertaining VIPs and celebrities in venues such as The Dorchester, Hyde Park and Lanesborough hotels. She also qualified as an A-level teacher in Performing Arts and Music.

In 2001, Redman Lusher was teaching A-level music and performing arts at the Sixth Form College, Farnborough, Hampshire, when she devised the concept of Rock Choir.

== Rock Choir ==
Redman Lusher launched Rock Choir in 2005. Beginning with 70 members, it currently has more than 33,000 members across the UK. Redman Lusher is widely considered to be the pioneer of the "no audition, no need to read music" amateur contemporary choir movement. An article in the Sunday Times Culture Magazine in 2009 called her "the key to the choir's success".

"Others have attempted a similar formula, but none have turned an amateur group singing pop songs into a brand this powerful. She stands out for her rigorous classical training (Grade 8 piano and violin by 15; a degree in popular music from Salford; a thesis on Annie Lennox's songwriting style) and her insistence on a slick, professionally run outfit. Rock Choir works with a variety of people, from rights lawyers to web technicians to sound engineers. The selection and harmonising of the music – sometimes up to seven-part harmony, no mean feat – is done by Lusher herself."

== Awards and nominations ==
=== Gold Badge Award ===
Caroline Redman Lusher was honoured with a Gold Badge Award by the British Association of Songwriters, Composers and Authors (BASCA) in association with the Performing Rights Society (PRS). This award was given to Redman Lusher in recognition of her exceptional contribution to British music. Only a handful of people receive it each year.

=== Guild of Entrepreneurs ===
Redman Lusher was invited to become one of the 100 founding members of the Guild of Entrepreneurs promoting excellence in the profession of Entrepreneurship.

=== Freedom of the City of London ===
Caroline was awarded the Freedom of the City of London at a ceremony at the Guildhall, London. The Freedom of the City of London is an honour bestowed by a municipality upon a valued member of the community. It is handed to a person who has achieved success in their chosen field and is recognition of the highest level of excellence and trust in the goods and services they provide.

=== Power 100 ===
Caroline Redman Lusher was celebrated in the Power 100 of Inspiring Entrepreneurs. The Smith & Williamson Power 100 identifies those who use their experience or expertise to provide vital support to help inspire and professionalise the UK's up-and-coming businesses. Without these types of individuals, many brands that are household names today would simply not exist – they are critical to the wellbeing of the entrepreneurial ecosystem. 2016 saw names like Richard Branson, Baroness Karren Brady CBE and Baroness Martha Lane-Fox recognised for their contribution to championing the entrepreneurial cause.

=== Honorary Doctor of Letters ===
Caroline Redman Lusher was awarded an Honorary Doctor of Letters by the London College of Music in July 2017 to honour her contribution to music education and for her creation of Rock Choir.

Honorary Doctor of Arts

Caroline Redman Lusher was awarded an Honorary Doctor of Arts in July 2024 by Salford University to honour her contribution to music and the arts.

== Guest speaker and team-building workshops ==
Redman Lusher is a popular speaker at corporate events, educational workshops and business conferences, for organisations such as British Telecom, the WI, the Welsh Women Mean Business Awards, the Yorkshire Countrywomen's Association, and the Red Ribbon Awards. She has also incorporated music and song into team-building workshops run for companies including Virgin Money, Procter & Gamble and Santander.

== Philanthropy ==
Redman Lusher supports numerous local and national charities both personally and through Rock Choir. In 2012 Rock Choir helped raise over £1 million for charity through its performances and social events. Redman Lusher has helped raise the profile of Rock Choir's two official charities, Missing People and Refuge, and agreed that Rock Choir should become official community sponsors of Missing People, regularly raising money through events and supporting the charity behind the scenes.

In February 2013, Sir Trevor McDonald announced Redman Lusher's appointment as an ambassador for Missing People. Sir Trevor made the announcement at the charity's offices in Mortlake as he formally accepted a cheque from Redman Lusher for £17,000, which was raised by Rock Choir's 16,000 members via fundraising events in their communities. Over the past two years, Rock Choir has raised over £50,000 to help the charity offer a lifeline to families when someone disappears.

"As Patron of the charity Missing People, I am truly delighted to welcome Caroline Redman Lusher as Ambassador of the charity. If your child went missing wouldn't you want the world to stop and look for them? Thanks to Caroline, Rock Choir communities across the UK have already raised significant funds and awareness to aid the search. I know that she will be a truly formidable force as the charity seeks to bring more missing children and vulnerable adults to safety." – Sir Trevor McDonald

Redman Lusher is also a patron of the charity W4W (Words for Wounded) alongside Louis de Bernières and Julian Fellowes. W4W supports the rehabilitation of wounded servicemen and women.

== Music career ==
Redman Lusher gained a 2:1 BA Honours degree in Popular Music and Recording from Salford University, and has grade eight certificates in both violin and piano from the Royal School of Music. She has described a major early influence as Annie Lennox – Redman Lusher based her university dissertation on Lennox's composition skills. Other early influences include Tina Turner, ELO, and Aretha Franklin.

=== Rock Choir Vol. 1 ===
Redman Lusher composed the vocal arrangements and sang lead vocals on the first Rock Choir album, Rock Choir Vol. 1, released in 2010 by Universal/Decca Records. It reached number 18 in the UK album charts.

=== Rock Choir Deluxe ===
Rock Choir's second album, Rock Choir Deluxe, also featured song arrangements and lead vocals by Redman Lusher. It was released digitally to coincide with the airing of the three-part ITV1 documentary The Choir That Rocks. It reached number 17 in the UK digital downloads chart.

=== Perfect Day (album) (Various Artists) ===
This double album compilation featured Redman Lusher singing lead vocals on the Labi Siffre track (Something Inside) So Strong.

=== The Soldiers (album) The Soldiers 2012 ===
Redman Lusher featured in a duet with Sergeant Gary Chiltern on the track Songbird by Fleetwood Mac.

=== Message to You (album) The Soldiers 2011 ===
This album reached gold status, selling over 100,000 copies. It featured Redman Lusher in a duet with Corporal Ryan Idzi performing Wherever I Lay My Hat.

=== Best Of (album) The Soldiers 2011 ===
Redman Lusher featured in Against All Odds.

=== Love Songs (album) The Soldiers 2010 ===
This album reached double platinum status and raised nearly £90,000 for the charity Help For Heroes. It featured Redman Lusher in the duet Against All Odds.

=== Unsung Hero (single) Blake 2009 ===
Redman Lusher featured on the track, which was released as a single from the popular album Together.

=== Together (album) Blake 2009 ===
Redman Lusher featured on the track Unsung Hero.

=== Coming Home (album) The Soldiers 2009 ===
One of the biggest selling albums of 2009, reaching sales of over 600,000 and achieving double platinum status. Redman Lusher featured again in Against All Odds.

== Discography ==
- Rock Choir Vol. 1 Rock Choir (2010)
- Perfect Day Various Artists (2010) 'Something Inside So Strong'
- Rock Choir Deluxe Rock Choir (2011)
- The Soldiers The Soldiers (2012) 'Songbird'
- Message To You The Soldiers (2011) 'Wherever I Lay My Hat'
- Best Of The Soldiers (2011) 'Against All Odds'
- Love Songs The Soldiers (2010) 'Against All Odds'
- Together Blake (2009) 'Unsung Hero'
- Unsung Hero Blake (2009) 'Unsung Hero'
- Coming Home The Soldiers (2009) 'Against All Odds'

== Personal life ==
On 2 August 2008, Redman Lusher married pilot Stuart Redman. They live in Farnham, Surrey and have a son named Hamilton, born in 2020.

Redman Lusher's father (a.k.a. Captain Rock Choir) is former British Airways Chief Pilot Dave Lusher, who is now Rock Choir's company secretary. Her sister Liz Lusher is also British Airways cabin crew.

In 2011, Redman Lusher starred in the three-part ITV1 documentary The Choir that Rocks, which followed her and her team as they prepared for a mass performance by more than 8,000 Rock Choir members at Wembley Arena on 15 May 2011. After the first episode, 23,000 people logged onto their website, crashing the Rock Choir server, and 8,000 people emailed with membership enquiries.
