= Message to You =

Studio album by The Soldiers
- Released: 24 October 2011
- Recorded: September 2011, London
- Genre: Vocal
- Length: 55:59
- Label: Demon Music Group
- Producer: Nick Patrick

The Soldiers chronology
Letters Home (2010)	Message to You (2010)	The Soldiers (2012)

Singles from Message to You
- 1. "I've Gotta Get a Message to You" Released: 23 October 2011

Message to You is the third album by The Soldiers. The album was released on 24 October 2011. On 30 October 2011 entered the UK Albums Chart at number 11. The album includes the single "I've Gotta Get a Message to You".

== Singles ==
- "I've Gotta Get a Message to You" was the first single released from the album, released on 23 October 2010.

== Track listing ==
- Standard listing
1. "I've Gotta Get a Message to You" (with. Robin Gibb) (Barry Gibb, Robin Gibb, Maurice Gibb) – 3:19
2. "Pipes of Peace" (Paul McCartney) – 3:24
3. "Make You Feel My Love" (Bob Dylan) – 3:33
4. "Right Here Waiting" (Richard Marx) – 4:12
5. "Dance with My Father" (Luther Vandross, Marx) – 4:25
6. "If Tomorrow Never Comes" (Garth Brooks, Kent Blazy) – 3:37
7. "Better Be Home Soon" (Neil Finn) – 3:15
8. "Do I Make You Proud" (Tracy Ackerman, Andy Watkins, Paul Wilson) – 4:09
9. "Desperado" (Don Henley, Glenn Frey) – 3:36
10. "Home Coming" (Jeff Chegwin, Nick Patrick) – 3:54
11. "For All Your Loved Ones" (Chegwin, Patrick) – 3:36
12. "Father and Son" (Cat Stevens) – 2:50
13. "I'll Be There for You" (David Crane, Marta Kauffman, Michael Skloff, Phil Solem, Danny Wilde, Allee Willis) – 3:09
14. "Through the Barricades" (Gary Kemp) – 6:16
15. "You'll Never Walk Alone" (Richard Rodgers, Oscar Hammerstein II) – 2:44

== Personnel ==
- Robin Gibb – vocals
- Trooper Ryan Idzi – vocals
- Sergeant Major Gary Chilton – vocals
- Sergeant Richie Maddocks – vocals
- Toby Champman – synthesisers

== Charts ==
=== Weekly charts ===
Chart (2011)	Peak position
Scottish Albums (OCC)	15
UK Albums (OCC)	11

=== Year-end charts ===
Chart (2011)	Position
UK Albums (OCC)	149

== Release history ==
Region	Date	Format	Label
United Kingdom	24 October 2011	Digital Download	Demon Music Group
United Kingdom	24 October 2011	CD	Demon Music Group
