= Rock Choir =

British contemporary choir

- Choir
- Rock Choir Official Logo
- Origin: UK
- Founded: 2005
- Genre: Pop, gospel and Motown
- Members: 25,000
- Director: Caroline Redman Lusher
- Website: rockchoir.com

Rock Choir is described as being the United Kingdom's original, and the world's largest, contemporary choir. It holds three Guinness World Records – 'biggest hit act in the UK', 'largest musical act to release an album (signed)' and 'largest song and dance routine held at multiple locations'. Rock Choir offers teenagers and adults the chance to sing contemporary songs without the need to audition, read music or have any previous singing experience. In November 2017 it had more than 25,000 members rehearsing in 400 locations throughout the UK. In August 2011, Coutts Woman Magazine described Rock Choir as "a community singing phenomenon that is sweeping the country," and "one of Britain's biggest brands."

== History ==
Rock Choir was established in 2005 by musician and singer Caroline Redman Lusher.

The Sunday Times Culture magazine said 'its formula is unique. Learning by rote (repetition, not sheet music), amateurs rehearse harmonies and choreographed movements to those hits that everybody knows and impulsively sings along to'. Redman Lusher first came up with the concept in the 1990s, while teaching music and performing arts at Farnborough 6th Form College, Hampshire. To help students pass their singing modules, she introduced weekly group singing sessions in which she taught three-part harmonies to well-liked songs.

In 2005, Redman Lusher placed an advertisement for Rock Choir in a coffee shop in Farnham, Surrey, which initially attracted the first 70 members.

=== Public performances ===
Rock Choir's first local public performance was in November 2005, at the Farnham Maltings, Surrey, raising money for Age Concern. More Rock Choir performances followed in 2006 and 2007 at a wide range of local events, including the annual music festival, GuilFest. The growing success of Rock Choir has led to increasing regional and national press interest. Rock Choir have performed en-masse at iconic venues such as O2 Arena, London, The Liverpool Echo Arena, Wembley Arena, Hammersmith Apollo and the Royal Albert Hall. Rock Choir celebrated its 10th anniversary by inviting thousands of members to perform at the NEC, Birmingham alongside special guests, Chesney Hawkes, Kiki Dee and Kim Wilde.

=== Album recording ===
On 1 April 2009, BBC Breakfast showed a pre-filmed clip of a Rock Choir rehearsal and interviewed Redman Lusher live in the studio. Afterwards Redman Lusher was contacted by Universal Records, who offered Rock Choir a multi-album record deal. A few months later, 987 Rock Choir members aged between 6 and 70 recorded Rock Choir Vol. 1. With no recording studio able to accommodate such a large number of singers, Decca hired a school in Cranleigh, Surrey and sent a mobile recording studio.

Rock Choir Vol. 1 was released in July 2010 and reached number 1 in the Amazon charts, entering the top 20 in the UK album charts. Tom Lewis, Head of A&R for Universal's label, Decca Records, described it as "The feel-good album of the year."

On the release of the album, Redman Lusher said to The Daily Telegraph; "To have the opportunity of making an album that will be released worldwide is extraordinary. I am so very proud of all of them. Rock Choir has turned into a bit of a fairy tale." To celebrate the album launch, every member of Rock Choir was invited to sing at a special celebratory performance at the Hammersmith Apollo, which also helped raise awareness for the charity Refuge. Over 3,000 Rock Choir members attended.

=== The Soldiers tour ===
In 2010 Rock Choir supported The Soldiers – a singing trio consisting of three serving British Army soldiers – on their UK-wide 'Coming Home' tour. Redman Lusher sang as a solo artist on their album, which reached double platinum status. She joined them and Rock Choir as a soloist on the tour, which culminated in a performance at the Royal Albert Hall.

=== 'The Choir That Rocks' ===
In 2010, Redman Lusher was approached by 10 Star Entertainment and ITV, who wanted to produce a documentary following the Rock Choir story. By now Rock Choir had over 8,000 members across the UK. In January 2011, the TV crews filmed Redman Lusher, her team and the members as Rock Choir prepared for its biggest ever show at Wembley Arena. The filming featured new choirs as they opened in Yorkshire, Scotland and Dorset, and resulted in a three-part ITV1 documentary 'The Choir That Rocks', which was aired in June 2011, and repeated in September 2011. After the first episode, 23,000 people logged on to the Rock Choir website, crashing the server, and 8,000 people emailed with membership enquiries. The second Rock Choir album, 'Rock Choir Deluxe', was released at the same time as the TV show.

=== Awards ===
In 2015, Rock Choir was awarded the Sun Mark Big Heart award at the Red Ribbon Awards, which recognises businesses which are intrinsically generous and passionate about volunteering, fundraising and having an impact on the local community.

=== Charity work ===
Rock Choir is a small family-run organisation, not a franchise. Since its beginning, it has raised millions of pounds for local and national charities through its performances and membership events, including its chosen charity, Nordoff Robbins. In March 2012, Rock Choir carried out a series of nationwide flash mobs and performances in support of Sport Relief, which raised over £11,000 for the Comic Relief charity.

== Recordings ==
The first Rock Choir album, Rock Choir Vol. 1, was released in July 2010 and reached number 1 in five different Amazon charts, entering the top 20 in the UK album charts. The album cover contains the name of every Rock Choir member that year. Tom Lewis, head of A&R for Decca Records, the Universal label releasing the album, said, "Rock Choir is a phenomenon. When you hear them sing, it makes you feel fantastic. It's totally infectious stuff."

Rock Choir Deluxe, was released digitally and featured seven new tracks, some of which made up elements of the musical content on ITV1's documentary, The Choir That Rocks. These include Electric Light Orchestra's "Mr Blue Sky" and a Teen Rock Choir version of Florence and the Machine's "You Got the Love". 'Rock Choir Deluxe also features a recording of Labi Siffre's "(Something Inside) So Strong", sung live at Wembley Arena by around 7,500 Rock Choir members, with Redman Lusher taking lead vocal. When Sony and Decca were looking for tracks for the double-album compilation, Perfect Day, the Rock Choir track "(Something Inside) So Strong", was selected.

== Discography ==
Albums

- Rock Choir Vol. 1 (2010)
- Perfect Day (various artists) (2010)
- Rock Choir Deluxe (2011)

Singles

- Hallelujah (2018) Peak 66, UK
- The First Noel/Silent Night (2018) Peak 32, UK
- Keeping the Dream Alive (2020) Peak 1, UK
- I Wish it could be Christmas Everyday (2023) Peak 8, UK
- Fix You (2024) Peak 28, UK

== Notable achievements ==
Rock Choir has achieved three Guinness World Records to date: 'the largest musical act to release an album (signed)' on 20 June 2010 followed by 'the biggest hit act in the UK' just a month later on 17 July 2010. On 23 June 2012, a total of 7,914 Rock Choir members successfully completed a synchronised nationwide performance of the Bryan Adams and Melanie C duet 'Baby When You're Gone', winning them the record for 'the largest song and dance routine held at multiple locations'.

=== Notable performances ===
- First appearance at GuilFest, 15 July 2007
- Disneyland Paris, 12–13 July 2008
- BBC Breakfast Show, 1 April 2009
- The Paul O'Grady Show, 15 April 2009
- BBC's The One Show, 16 July 2010
- Songs of Praise, 25 April 2010
- St David's Hall, Cardiff (The Soldiers Tour), 1 April 2010
- The Royal Albert Hall (The Soldiers Tour), 4 April 2010
- Symphony Hall, Birmingham (The Soldiers Tour), 7 April 2010
- vInspired National Awards, Indig02 O2 Arena (London), 17 March 2011
- Get Connected UK dinner and charity auction, the UnderGlobe, 7 March 2012
- Miles for Missing People, in support of Missing People, 17 March 2012
- Indig02 Rocks, O2 Arena (London), in support of Living Paintings charity, 24 March 2012
- Saracens F.C. v Harlequin F.C. match, Wembley Stadium, 31 March 2012
- Saracens F.C. v Leicester Tigers match, Wembley Stadium, 15 September 2012
- The Royal Albert Hall (The Winter Whites Gala), 8 December 2012
- The Alan Titchmarsh Show, 20 February 2013
- The Echo Arena Liverpool, 29 June 2013
- The O2 Arena (London), 6 July 2013
- The Winter Whites Gala,(Kensington Palace), 26 November 2013
- Saracens R.F.C vs Harlequins R.F.C 28 March 2015
- The Genting Arena (Birmingham), 6 & 7 June 2015
- Saracens R.F.C vs Harlequins R.F.C 16 April 2016
- Saracens R.F.C vs Harlequins R.F.C mid-2017

== Rock Choir trademark ==
The Rock Choir name and website are trademarks of Rock Choir Ltd. All rights are reserved.

The following is a complete and exhaustive list of the groups, companies (profit and not for profit) or general entities that are legally licensed by Rock Choir Ltd to use its trademarks:

1. Universal Music Group
2. Decca Records
3. 10 Star Entertainment
4. ITV

Rock Choir is committed to using music fairly, in line with the Musicians' Union Code of Fair Practice, and has licensing agreements with the following publishers including their subsidiaries to use music under their control: EMI; ATV Music Publishing; Universal Music Publishing; Music Sales; PRS for Music; MCPS; Carlin America; Warner/Chappell Music; Alfred Music Publishing; Bocu and Faber Music. Rock Choir is committed to using newsprint and online news content fairly and respecting newsprint copyright. Rock Choir and rockchoir.com are licensed by the NLA (Newspaper Licensing Authority) to reproduce news articles.

== See also ==
- The Lounge Kittens
