= Live Is Overrated =

Live album by Pain
- Released: 2005
- Genre: Industrial metal
- Length: 68:14
- Label: Metal Mind
- Producer: Peter Tägtgren

Live Is Overrated is a live album by the Swedish industrial metal band Pain. It was released in 2005 in Poland by Metal Mind, followed by a U.S. release in 2006 by MVD Visual. The album was recorded from January to March 2005 in Poland and Finland.

== Reception ==
A review in Metal.de rated the album as solid but not outstanding compared to other bands' live releases, specifically criticizing an interview in the bonus section. A review in the Swedish magazine Groove gave it a rating of "clearly approved". Additionally, a review in Exclaim! stated that the performance was short in little other than length.

== Track listing ==
=== Metalmania, Katowice ===
1. "Supersonic Bitch" – 3:41
2. "End Of The Line" – 4:41
3. "On Your Knees" – 4:20
4. "Dancing With The Dead" – 4:24
5. "It's Only Them" – 5:00
6. "Just Hate Me" – 4:16
7. "Same Old Song" – 4:13
8. "Shut Your Mouth" – 4:41

=== Krzemionki, Krakow ===
1. "Greed" – 2:42
2. "Breathing In Breathing Out" – 4:30
3. "Suicide Machine" – 4:40
4. "Nothing" – 4:12
5. "Eleanor Rigby" – 4:19
6. "On And On" – 4:06

=== Tavastia, Helsinki ===
1. "Supersonic Bitch" – 3:46
2. "End Of The Line" – 4:43

=== Bonus tracks ===
1. "End Of The Line" – 3:55
2. "Suicide Machine" – 4:16
3. "On And On" – 3:18
4. "Shut Your Mouth" – 4:13
5. "Just Hate Me" – 4:56
6. "Same Old Song" – 4:04
7. "Bye/Die" – 2:36
