= Tibetan Prayer (album) =

Studio album by Yungchen Lhamo
- Released: 1995
- Label: Yungchen Lhamo
- Producer: John Prior

Yungchen Lhamo chronology
Tibetan Prayer (1995)	Tibet, Tibet (1996)

Tibetan Prayer is the debut studio album by Tibetan musician Yungchen Lhamo. The album was self-released in 1995..

At the ARIA Music Awards of 1995, the album won the ARIA Award for Best World Music Album.

== Track listing ==
1. "Om Mane Padme Hung" - 3:53
2. "Ari Lo" - 3:56
3. "Gyalwa Tenzing Gyaltso" - 4:14
4. "Tenyung" - 1:15
5. "Omar Chung Chung" - 2:16
6. "Gong Shey" - 1:24
7. "Sangye Choe Dan Tsog" - 6:38
8. "Lama Dorje Chang" - 5:11
9. "Gi Pai Po Yul Cho-La" - 3:43
