= I'm Coming Home =

"I'm Coming Home" may refer to:

- “I’m Coming Home” (Ai song), 2020 single by Ai
- "I'm Coming Home" (Tom Jones song), a 1967 song written by John Mason and Les Reed
- I'm Coming Home (album), a 1973 Johnny Mathis album
  - "I'm Coming Home" (Johnny Mathis song)", a 1973 song written by Thom Bell and Linda Creed
- "I'm Coming Home", a 1980 single by Birtles & Goble
- "I'm Coming Home", a 1956 song by Johnny Horton
- "I'm Coming Home", a 1961 song by Elvis Presley
- "I'm Comin' Home", a 1971 song by Tommy James
- "I'm Comin' Home", a 1988 song by New Edition

== See also ==
- I'm Going Home (disambiguation)
- Coming Home (disambiguation)
- "Slight Return", a 1996 single by The Bluetones where the phrase "I'm coming home" is the climax of the chorus
