= Summerton Mill =

British TV animation for young children

- Genre: Children's television, animation
- Created by: Pete Bryden; Ed Cookson
- Voices of: Silas Hawkins
- Country of origin: United Kingdom
- No. of seasons: 2
- No. of episodes: 27

Production
- Camera setup: stop motion
- Running time: 5 minutes per episode approximately

Original release
- Network: CBeebies
- Release: 6 September 2005

Summerton Mill is a British children's television series created by Pete Bryden and Ed Cookson. It was first shown on the CBeebies channel in 2005 as a segment of the BBC's Tikkabilla. It has subsequently been repeated both within Tikkabilla and as a standalone show on CBeebies and BBC Two.

It is a stop motion animated series, set at a ruined watermill, featuring the characters Dan, his dog Fluffa, Dr and Mrs Naybhur who used to live up on the hill, Francoise the cow, Mousey-Tongue the cat, two "yellow-spinner" chickens and the "millfreaks", tiny creatures which appear to resemble small, furry hedgehogs.

== Premise ==
Each episode begins with narration explaining that when the waterwheel at abandoned Summerton Mill turns, it returns to its original state, complete with its former inhabitants Dan, Dr. Naybhur and Mrs. Naybhur.

After a short and humorous event, the waterwheel slows down, and Summerton Mill returns to its present state.

== Production ==
Summerton Mill was inspired by Somerton Mill, a riverside property which was owned by Pete Bryden. It was at this secluded riverside location that the project was conceived and the pilot episode was filmed.

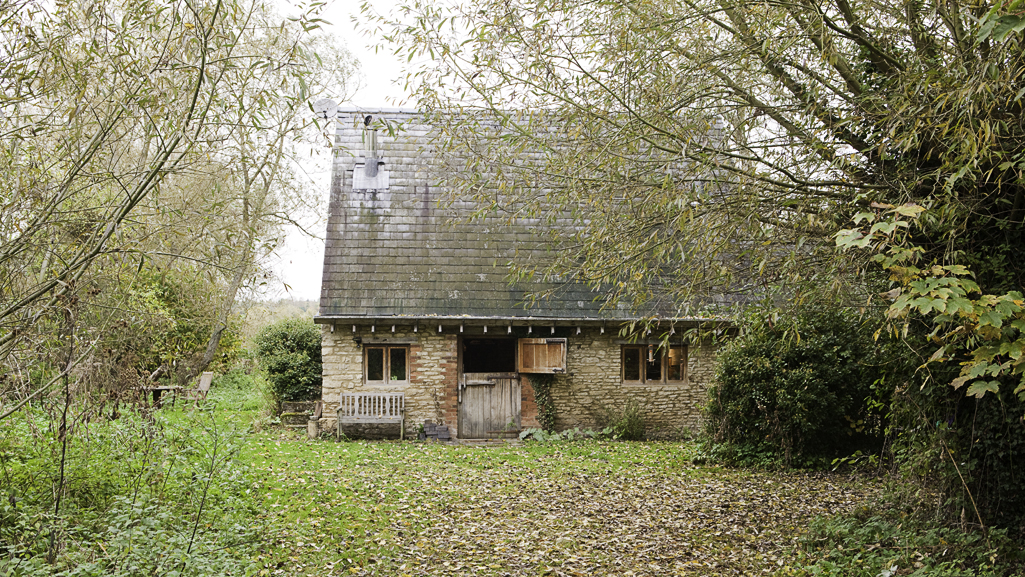
Somerton Mill 2009

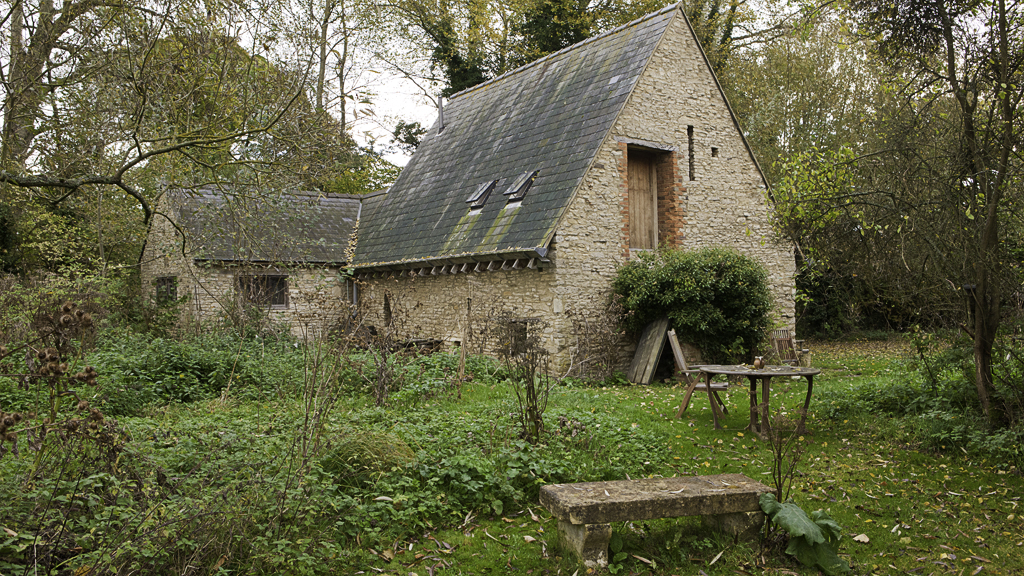
Somerton Mill 2009

Pete and Ed Cookson designed the sets and the characters, wrote the scripts, edited the video and sound, animated most of the first series and wrote and performed the music. A small production team was drafted in for the second series when the assistant animator of Series 1, James Cleland, was promoted to Director of Animation. ScaryCat Studios built the props and puppets for both series.

All the voices were provided by Silas Hawkins, whose father Peter provided the voices for the Flower Pot Men, Captain Pugwash and the Daleks in Doctor Who. He joined production on a speculative basis, and based the voice of Mrs. Naybhur on the one his father created for the character Big Fat Rosie, who featured in a series of stories by author Mary Danby Calvert which he (Peter) read on the radio programme Listen with Mother. He (Silas) felt that the framing sequences that began and ended each episode of Summerton Mill were ‘A.E. Housman-esque’ i.e. rather melancholy and elegiac for a children's programme (though not necessarily the worse for that) with their implication that the turning and eventual stopping of the wheel of the derelict watermill was first summoning and then banishing the ghosts (or, more prosaically, memories) of the characters whose comical adventures from a remembered past formed the body of the episode.

== Reception ==
Summerton Mill was well-received upon release, and was expanded into its own timeslot on BBC Two, as opposed to being featured in Tikkabilla. The international rights to the show were given to VGI Entertainment, who launched it at MipJunior in 2006. This led to the series being broadcast in at least 85 countries, however the second series was never broadcast in the UK. It was, however, available on ITunes, with Series 1 available on DVD.

== Episodes ==
=== Series 1 (2005) ===
- Pilot episode (Extended Introduction)
- "The Hole"
- "Kite Flying"
- "The Sock Thing"
- "Wing Nuts"
- "Hiding"
- "Dr Naybhur's Song"
- "Cheering Up"
- "The Baby Millfreak"
- "Lost and Found"
- "Mrs Naybhur's Vegetables" (Rework of the pilot episode)
- "Chinese Whispers"
- "The Picnic"
- "Mrs Naybhur's Poem"

=== Series 2 (2007) ===
- "Buried Treasure"
- "Counting the Stones"
- "Dan's Amazing Magic Show"
- "The Lazy Day"
- "Dan's Little Job"
- "Laughing"
- "The Story"
- "Painting"
- "Statue"
- "Dan's Seeds"
- "Dr Naybhur's Balloon"
- "The Bottle Organ"
- "The Present"
