= Comeback Kid =

Comeback Kid may refer to:

== People ==
- Bill Clinton, a nickname he applied to himself after an unexpectedly strong second-place showing in the 1992 New Hampshire Democratic primary
- Mario Lemieux, a Canadian former professional ice hockey player
- Joe Montana, American football player
- Stu Ungar, American professional gambler

== Film and television ==
- The Comeback Kid (film), a 1980 TV film
- "Comeback Kid", an episode of Disney's Bonkers
- "Comeback Kid", an episode from season 4 of Parks and Recreation
- The Comeback Kid, a 2015 comedy special by John Mulaney

== Music ==
- Comeback Kid (band), a Canadian hardcore punk band from Winnipeg
- "Comeback Kid" (Sleigh Bells song), 2012
- "Comeback Kid" (The Band Perry song), 2016
- The Comeback Kid (album), a 2023 album by Marnie Stern
- "The Comeback Kid", a song by Keith Whitely from the 1994 album Keith Whitley: A Tribute Album
- "The Comeback Kid", a song by B. Reith from the 2009 album Now Is Not Forever
- "Comeback Kid", a song by Kip Moore from the 2015 album Wild ones
- "Comeback Kid", a 2016 song by Kasabian
- "Comeback Kid", a 2018 song by Sharon Van Etten
- "Comeback Kid (That's My Dog)", a song by Brett Dennen from the 2011 album Loverboy

== See also ==
- Comeback (disambiguation)
