= Yungchen Lhamo =

Tibetan singer-songwriter

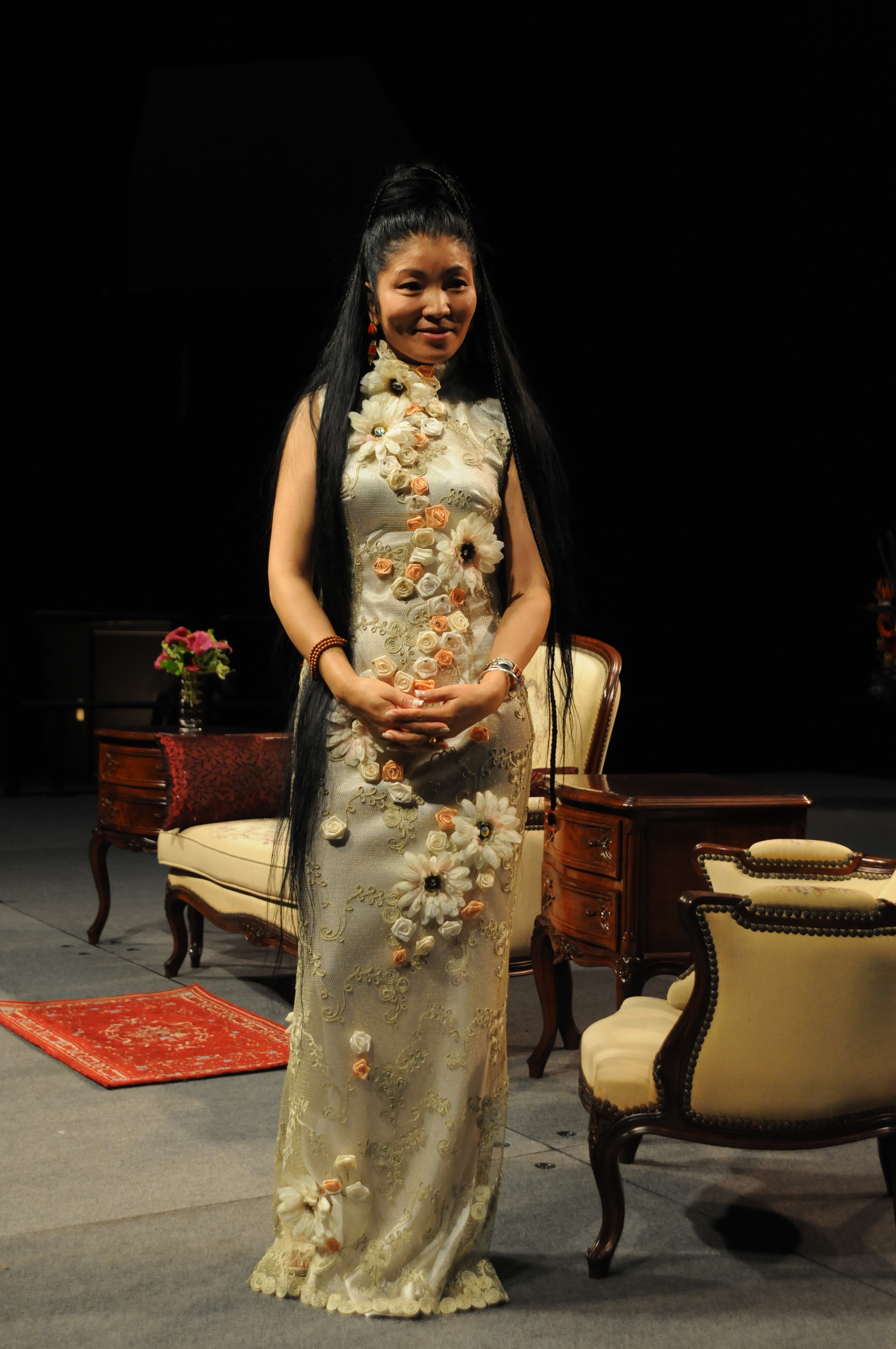
- Yungchen Lhamo in 2016

Background information
- Born: 1960s
- Origin: Lhasa, Tibet Autonomous Region, China
- Genres: New-age, traditional, world
- Years active: 1990–present
- Label: Real World Records
- Website: yungchenlhamo.com

Yungchen Lhamo (Tibetan: དབྱངས་ཅན་ལྷ་མོ, meaning "goddess of eloquence" or Sarasvati) is a Tibetan singer-songwriter living in the United States. She won the ARIA Award for Best World Music Album in 1995 and was then signed by Peter Gabriel's Real World record label.

== Life and career ==
Yungchen Lhamo is the Tibetan translation of Sarasvati, a name given to her by a Buddhist monk at her birth.

Lhamo left Tibet in 1989 to make a pilgrimage to Dharamsala. She was inspired to reach out to the world through her music. She moved to Australia in 1993, then to New York City in 2000.

Lhamo's Australian debut album, Tibetan Prayer, produced by John Prior, won the ARIA Award for Best World Music Album in 1995. The success of that record led to her signing with Peter Gabriel's Real World label. Her first record for the label, Tibet, Tibet, mainly features a cappella renditions of original compositions—authentic Tibetan Buddhist prayers and songs. Her next recording, Coming Home, was a collaboration with producer Hector Zazou, showcasing her voice and also featuring chanting by Tibetan monks, a wide range of mostly modern Western instruments and the benefits of multitrack recording which enabled her voice to be layered repeatedly.

Lhamo has toured in at least 70 countries, singing her own songs and traditional Buddhist chants and mantras. She has performed and recorded with artists that include Natalie Merchant, Peter Gabriel, Annie Lennox, Billy Corgan, and Bono. Lhamo's recordings have been used in the film Seven Years in Tibet and many Tibetan documentaries. She has performed at venues such as London's Royal Festival Hall, New York City's Carnegie Hall, and Berlin's Philharmonic Hall. She has performed at the Lilith Fair festival and performed in WOMAD festivals.

Lhamo's album Ama (Tibetan: 'Mother') was released in April 2006. It was produced by the Iranian-American musician Jamshied Sharifi. Featured artists include Annie Lennox on the song Fade Away, and Joy Askew on the song Tara. In November 2007, Lhamo accompanied a site-specific dance work called "Walking The Line" by the American choreographer Bill T. Jones at the Louvre in Paris. The performance, which also featured solo percussion by Florent Jodelet, took place in a 300-foot-long (91 m) space stretching from Michelangelo's statue The Dying Slave to the foot of the staircase leading to the sculpture Winged Victory of Samothrace.

Lhamo's fifth album, Tayatha ('It Is Like This') was released in June 2013 by Cantaloupe Music. On this album she collaborated with the Russian pianist Anton Batagov. Her work with mentally ill and homeless people was covered by Newsweek in 2015.

Lhamo released Awakening Album in 2022, which explores the relevance of compassion-based spirituality to our modern-day, interdependent lives—each song reflecting topics that have become ever-more highlighted by the COVID-19 pandemic. Awakening was produced in collaboration with Julio Garcia. Produced in Madrid, it features "Loving Kindness", in which Yungchen is joined by flamenco legend Carmen Linares. Lhamo stated: "Awakening aims to appeal to those who are interested in sound healing and spiritual awakening, and, unlike previous albums, uses only English song titles. It is also my first album to include a song in Mandarin. I truly believe that voice has vibrational energy to connect, empower, heal and transform all human beings. I hope these new songs will help bring inner peace and true happiness to everyone who hears them."

Lhamo has also continued her work with the One Drop of Kindness Foundation, and she has helped to raise funds for humanitarian projects. In 2023, she released the album One Drop of Kindness, co-produced with John Alevizakis.

== Discography ==
Title	Details	Peak positions
Title	Details	AUS
Tibetan Prayer	Released: 1995; Label: Yungchen Lhamo (YLCD001); Formats: CD	—
Tibet, Tibet	Released: 1996; Label: Real World Records (CDRW 59); Formats: CD	—
Coming Home	Released: 1998; Label: Real World Records (CDRW 72); Formats: CD	93
Ama	Released: March 2006; Label: Real World Records (CDRW 132); Formats: CD	—
Tayatha with Anton Batagov	Released: June 2013; Label: Cantaloupe Music (CA21090); Formats: CD, digital	—
Awakening	Released: 2022; Label: Formats: CD	—
One Drop of Kindness	Released: September 2023; Label: Real World Records; Formats: CD / Vinyl	—

== Awards and nominations ==
The ARIA Music Awards is an annual awards ceremony that recognises excellence, innovation, and achievement across all genres of Australian music. They commenced in 1987. Yungchen Lhamo won one award.

Year	Nominee / work	Award	Result	Ref.
1995	Tibetan Prayer	Best World Music Album	Won	
