= I Am (Pain album) =

Studio album by Pain
- Released: 17 May 2024
- Recorded: 2021–2023
- Genre: Industrial metal; electro-metal
- Length: 41:07
- Label: Nuclear Blast
- Producer: Peter Tägtgren

Pain chronology
Coming Home (2016)	I Am (2024)

I Am is the ninth studio album by the Swedish industrial metal project Pain, released on 17 May 2024 via Nuclear Blast.

== Track listing ==
I Am track listing
No.	Title	Length
1.	"I Just Dropped By (to Say Goodbye)"	3:53
2.	"Don't Wake the Dead"	4:13
3.	"Go with the Flow"	3:02
4.	"Not for Sale"	3:06
5.	"Party in My Head"	3:06
6.	"I Am"	3:58
7.	"Push the Pusher"	4:11
8.	"The New Norm"	4:07
9.	"Revolution"	3:24
10.	"My Angel"	3:50
11.	"Fair Game"	4:17
Total length:		41:07

== Charts ==
Chart performance for I Am
Chart (2024)	Peak position
Austrian Albums (Ö3 Austria)	13
Finnish Albums (Suomen virallinen lista)	43
German Albums (Offizielle Top 100)	33
Swiss Albums (Schweizer Hitparade)	20
