= Letters Home (The Soldiers album) =

Studio album by The Soldiers
- Released: 25 October 2010
- Recorded: 2010
- Genre: Pop music
- Label: Rhino

The Soldiers chronology
Coming Home (2009)	Letters Home (2010)	Message to You (2011)

Singles from Letters Home
- 1. "Letters Home" Released: 15 October 2010

Letters Home is the second album by The Soldiers. The album was released on 25 October 2010. According to Midweek Charts the album was set to enter at number 12 on the UK Albums Chart, although it eventually charted at #10.

== Singles ==
- "Letters Home" was the first single released from the album, released on 15 October 2010. It is dedicated to Tony Downes – a guardsman killed whilst in active service.

== Track listing ==
- CD single
1. "I Will Carry You" (Ronan Hardiman, Jeff Chegwin, Nick Patrick)– 3:56
2. "Have I Told You Lately?" (Van Morrison) – 3:43
3. "You're in My Heart" (Rod Stewart) – 4:01
4. "Wonderful Tonight" (Eric Clapton) – 3:39
5. "When a Man Loves a Woman" (Calvin Lewis, Andrew Wright) – 3:39
6. "Yesterday" (Lennon-McCartney) – 3:02
7. "Great British Hero" (Chegwin, Patrick, Jake Hook) – 4:42
8. "Your Song" (Elton John, Bernie Taupin) – 3:52
9. "Everlasting Love" (Buzz Cason, Mac Gayden) – 3:17
10. "You Are So Beautiful" (Billy Preston, Bruce Fisher) – 3:07
11. "The Air That I Breathe" (Albert Hammond, Mike Hazlewood) – 4:00
12. "True" (Gary Kemp) – 4:04
13. "Requiem for a Soldier (the theme from Band of Brothers)" (Michael Kamen, Frank Musker) – 3:42
14. "You Raise Me Up" (Rolf Løvland, Brendan Graham) – 3:51
15. "Missing You" (John Waite, Mark Leonard, Chas Sandford) – 3:26
16. "Every Time We Say Goodbye" (Cole Porter) – 3:16
17. "Letters Home" (Chegwin, Patrick, Hook, Tony Downes) – 3:05

== Chart performance ==
Letters Home entered the UK Albums Chart on 31 October 2010 at number 10, making it their second Top 10 album.

=== Weekly charts ===
Chart (2010)	Peak position
European Top 100 Albums	36
Scottish Albums (OCC)	11
UK Albums (OCC)	10

=== Year-end charts ===
Chart (2010)	Position
UK Albums (OCC)	80

== Certifications ==
Region	Certification	Certified units/sales
United Kingdom (BPI)	Gold	100,000^{^}
^{^} Shipments figures based on certification alone.

== Release history ==
Region	Date	Format	Label
United Kingdom	22 October 2010	Digital Download	Rhino Records
United Kingdom	25 October 2010	CD	Rhino Records
