= Coming Home (The Soldiers song) =

Single by The Soldiers

from the album Coming Home
- Released: 6 October 2009
- Recorded: 2009
- Genre: Pop, easy listening
- Length: 4:08
- Label: Rhino Entertainment / Warner Bros. Records
- Songwriters: Jake Hook, Nick Patrick, Jeff Chegwin
- Producers: Nick Patrick Executive Producers Jeff Chegwin & James Ware CPW Productions Ltd

The Soldier's singles chronology
| "Coming Home" (2009) | "A Soldiers Christmas Letter" (2009) |

"Coming Home" is a song performed by British pop singers The Soldiers. It was written by Jake Hook, Nick Patrick and Jeff Chegwin and produced by Patrick for The Soldier's first album Coming Home. Released on 6 October 2009 serving as the album's lead single, available on digital download only.

== Background ==
"Coming Home", a song written by Jake Hook, Nick Patrick and Jeff Chegwin and produced by Patrick for The Soldier's first album Coming Home The song's lyrics are a stirring wish and plead for Army personnel to come home safely, The song features a tin whistle, piano, bass, drum and full string section. The song's structure is as follows, introduction, first verse, chorus, second verse, string section instrumental, chorus to end.

The song which is four minutes and eight seconds, is in a 4/4 time signature. The vocals were recorded by Gary Chilton, Richie Maddocks and Ryan Idzi.

== Promotion ==
The Soldiers' first interview was with The Sun. Readers were invited to log on to The Sun's website to download the track for free for 48 hours.

The Soldiers' first official UK TV appearance to talk about Coming Home, was with Adam Boulton on SkyNews on Sunday 18 October 2009. The Soldiers also appeared on 'The Alan Titchmarsh Show and GMTV promoting the single.

== Credits and personnel ==
- Lead vocals – Sergeant Major Gary Chilton, Lance Corporal Ryan Idzi and Staff Sergeant Richie Maddocks
- Music – Jake Hook
- Lyrics – Jeff Chegwin, Jake Hook, Nick Patrick
- Producer – Nick Patrick
- Programming – Jake Hook
- String arrangement – Francis Haines, Jake Hook

Concept Jeff Chegwin and Nick Patrick

== Formats ==
The single was made available as a free download via The Sun's website. The version given away was the album version, which contains an instrumental string section. The length of this version is 4 minutes and 8 seconds.

The download version which was made available to major download sites such as iTunes, Amazon and Play.com cut the string instrumental and a portion of the introduction and lasts 2 minutes and 56 seconds.
