= Pain (musical project) =

Solo musical project of Peter Tägtgren

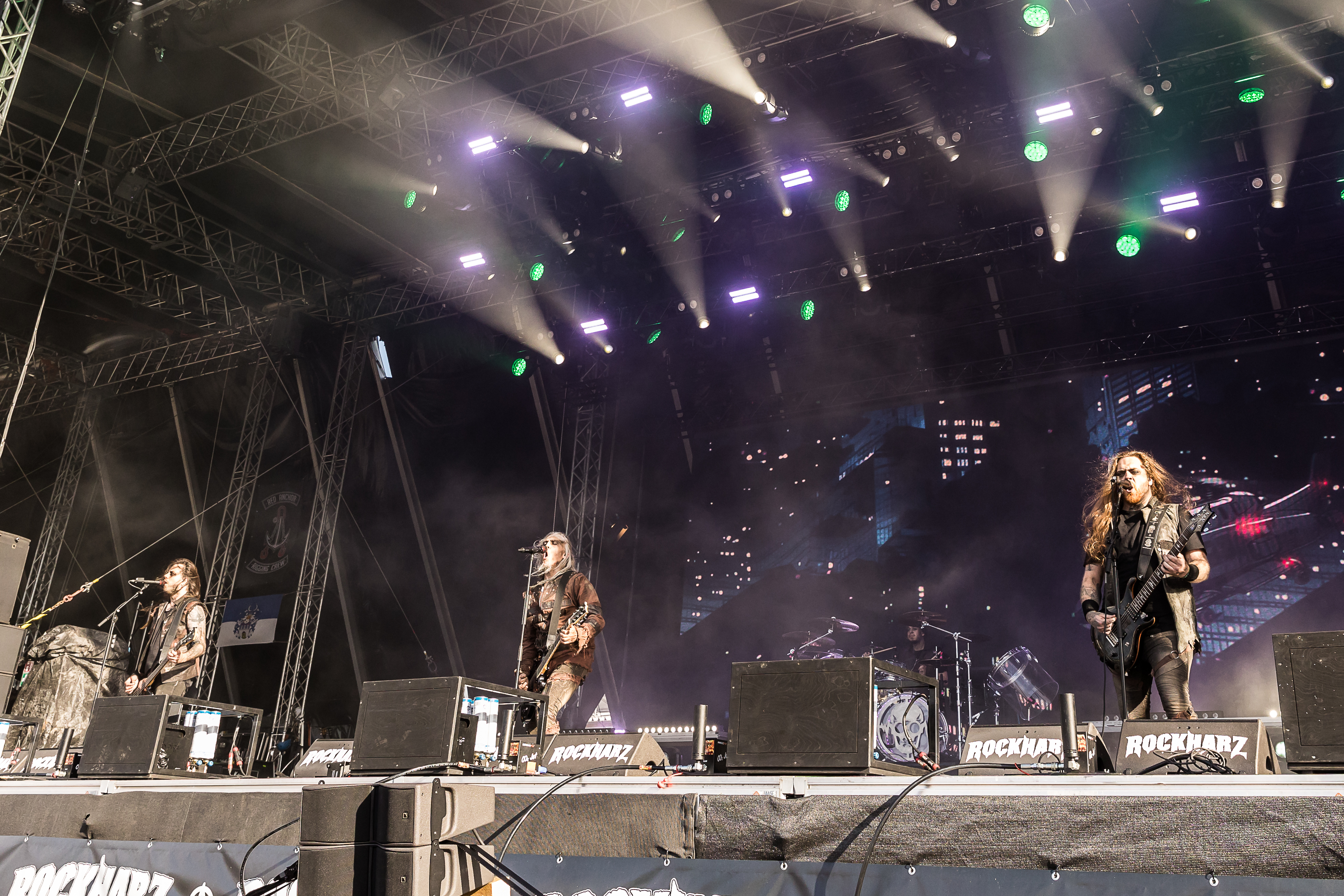
- Pain at Rockharz in 2024

Background information
- Origin: Ludvika, Sweden
- Genres: Industrial metal, alternative metal
- Years active: 1996–present
- Labels: Nuclear Blast; Stockholm; Metal Mind; Roadrunner
- Members: Peter Tägtgren
- Website: painworldwide.com

Pain (typeset as PAIN) is a musical project from Sweden that mixes heavy metal with influences from electronic music and techno. The project started out as a hobby project for frontman Peter Tägtgren, whose idea was to fuse heavy metal with 1980s-inspired electro-industrial and techno influences. Tägtgren, who is also the vocalist/guitarist of Hypocrisy and producer of his own The Abyss studios, is the only current member.

== History ==
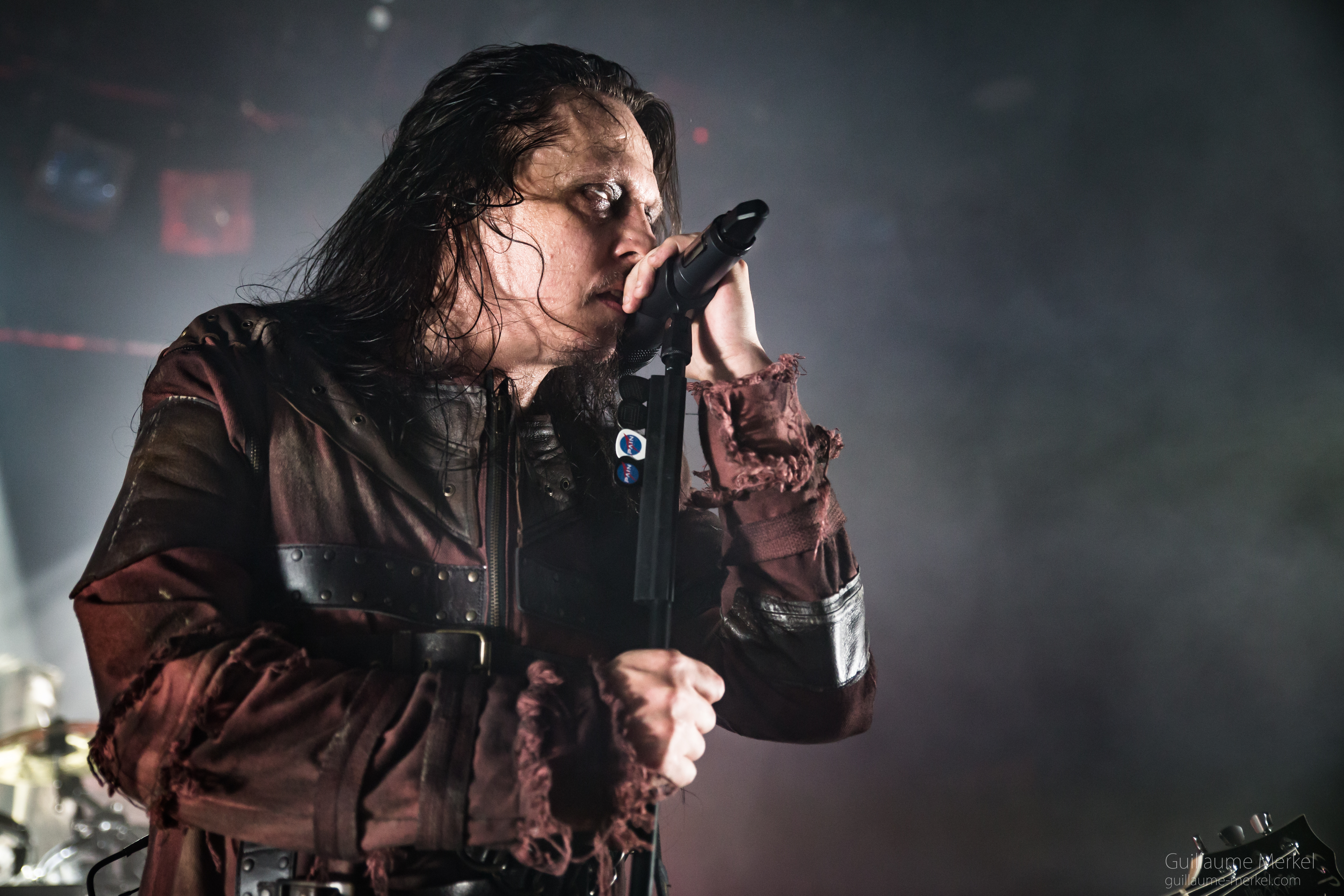
Peter Tägtgren in Selestat, France, 2017

Pain's self-titled debut was released in 1997, and since then Pain has released eight more albums and a DVD. Starting with their second, all of Pain's albums have made the Swedish charts, thanks in large part to hit singles such as "End of the Line", "Shut Your Mouth", and "Same Old Song". In early February 2006, Blabbermouth.net reported that Pain had signed with Roadrunner Records. Currently, Pain is under the Nuclear Blast Records banner. In 2008, Pain was on tour as a supporting performer for the Finnish symphonic power metal band Nightwish. During this tour singer Peter Tägtgren, drummer David Wallin, and bassist Johan Husgafvel were assaulted by a gang in Leipzig. Tägtgren received 10 stitches in his face, Wallin suffered a concussion and stitches to his head, and Husgafvel had his nose broken.

Pain supported Nightwish on the second half of their Dark Passion Play World Tour, along with Finnish pop rock band Indica, beginning with the first show in London, UK on 11 March 2009. Pain released their seventh album, You Only Live Twice, on 3 June 2011 via Nuclear Blast. They released their eighth studio album entitled Coming Home on 9 September 2016. The ninth album called I Am was released on 17 May 2024.

== Discography ==
=== Studio albums ===
Title	Album details	Peak chart positions						Certifications
Title	Album details	SWE	FIN	FRA	AUT	SWI	GER	Certifications
Pain	Released: 11 February 1997; Label: Nuclear Blast; Formats: CD, CS	—	—	—	—	—	—	
Rebirth	Released: 1999; Label: Stockholm Records; Formats: CD, CS	21	—	—	—	—	—	
Nothing Remains the Same	Released: 15 July 2002; Label: Stockholm Records; Formats: CD, CS	6	—	—	75	—	—	SWE: Gold
Dancing with the Dead	Released: 21 March 2005; Label: Stockholm Records; Formats: CD, CD+DVD	3	16	—	—	—	—	
Psalms of Extinction	Released: 23 April 2007; Label: Roadrunner Records; Formats: CD	21	21	165	—	—	93	
Cynic Paradise	Released: 31 October 2008; Label: Nuclear Blast; Formats: CD, LP, DL	30	28	165	—	—	78	
You Only Live Twice	Released: 3 June 2011; Label: Nuclear Blast; Formats: CD, LP, DL	36	26	—	75	64	40	
Coming Home	Released: 9 September 2016; Label: Nuclear Blast; Formats: CD, LP, DL	40	14	117	29	23	25	
I Am	Released: 17 May 2024; Label: Nuclear Blast; Formats: CD, LP, DL	—	—	—	—	20	33	
"—" denotes a recording that did not chart or was not released in that territory.

=== Singles ===
Year	Title	Peak chart positions		Certifications	Album
Year	Title	SWE	FIN	Certifications	Album
1999	"End of the Line"	15	—	SWE: Gold	Rebirth
1999	"On and On"	30	—		Rebirth
2000	"Suicide Machine"	—	—		Rebirth
2001	"Shut Your Mouth"	14	—		Nothing Remains the Same
2002	"Eleanor Rigby"	—	—		Nothing Remains the Same
2002	"Just Hate Me"	47	—		Nothing Remains the Same
2002	"Eleanor Rigby 2"	—	—		Nothing Remains the Same
2004	"Same Old Song"	18	5		Dancing with the Dead
2005	"Bye/Die"	—	—		Dancing with the Dead
2005	"Nothing"	—	—		Dancing with the Dead
2008	"I'm Going In"	—	—		Cynic Paradise
2009	"Follow Me" (featuring Anette Olzon)	—	—		Cynic Paradise
2011	"Dirty Woman"	—	—		You Only Live Twice
2011	"My Angel" (featuring Cécile Siméone)	—	—		
2016	"Black Knight Satellite"	—	—		Coming Home
2021	"Gimme Shelter"	—	—		
2021	"Party in My Head"	—	—		
2023	"Revolution"	—	—		
2023	"Go With The Flow"	—	—		
2023	"Push The Pusher"	—	—		
"—" denotes a recording that did not chart or was not released in that territory.

=== Video albums ===
Title	Video details	Peak chart positions
Title	Video details	SWE
Live Is Overrated	Released: 7 November 2006; Label: Metal Mind Productions; Formats: DVD	—
We Come in Peace	Released: 16 November 2012; Label: Nuclear Blast; Formats: DVD	14
"—" denotes a recording that did not chart or was not released in that territory.

=== Music videos ===
Year	Title	Directed	Album
1999	"End of the Line"	Mikeadelica (Mikael Gustafsson)	Rebirth
1999	"On and On"	—	Rebirth
1999	"Suicide Machine"	Mikeadelica (Mikael Gustafsson)	Rebirth
2002	"Shut Your Mouth"	Mikeadelica (Mikael Gustafsson)	Nothing Remains the Same
2002	"Just Hate Me"	Mikeadelica (Mikael Gustafsson)	Nothing Remains the Same
2005	"Same Old Song"	Mikeadelica (Mikael Gustafsson)	Dancing with the Dead
2005	"Bye/Die"	Jerker Josefsson	Dancing with the Dead
2005	"Nothing"	Daniel Kong	Dancing with the Dead
2007	"Zombie Slam"	Ralf Strathmann	Psalms of Extinction
2008	"Follow Me"	Ville Lipiäinen & Denis Goria	Cynic Paradise
2009	"Monkey Business"	Denis Goria	Cynic Paradise
2009	"Have a Drink on Me"	Denis Goria	Cynic Paradise
2011	"Dirty Woman"	—	You Only Live Twice
2011	"The Great Pretender"	—	You Only Live Twice
2016	"Call Me"	Ville Lipiäinen	Coming Home
2021	"Gimme Shelter"	—	
2021	"Party in My Head"	Andrey Kezzyn	
2023	"Revolution"	Andrey Kezzyn	
2024	"Go With The Flow"	Andrey Kezzyn	

== Members ==
Current members

- Peter Tägtgren – vocals, all instruments on CD (1996–present)

Current touring musicians

- Sebastian Tägtgren – drums (2016–present)
- Jonathan Olsson – bass (2016–present)
- Sebastian Svalland – guitars (2019–present)

Former touring musicians

- Yngve "Saroth" Liljebäck – bass (1999-2005)
- Mathias Kamijo – guitars (1999-2003)
- Reidar "Horgh" Horghagen – drums (1999-2003)
- Andrea Odendahl – guitars (2003-2007)
- Alla Fedynitch – bass (2005-2007)
- Marcus Jidell – guitars (2007)
- André Skaug – bass (2007/2011)
- René Sebastian – guitars (2007)
- Michael Bohlin – guitars (2007–2016)
- Johan Husgafvel – bass (2007–2016)
- Greger Andersson – guitars (2016–2019)
- David Wallin – drums (2003–2016)
