= Tikkabilla =

UK children's television programme

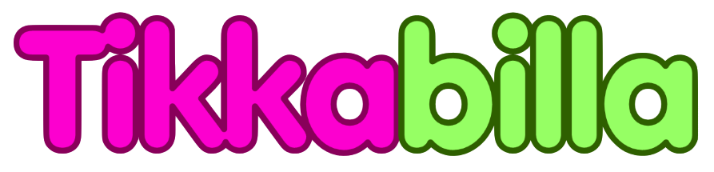
- Country of origin: United Kingdom
- Original language: English
- No. of series: 4
- No. of episodes: 280

Production
- Production location: BBC Elstree
- Running time: 30 minutes

Original release
- Network: CBeebies
- Release: 14 October 2002 – 25 January 2005

Tikkabilla is a British children's television programme, shown on CBeebies. The programme aims to educate preschool children in an entertaining manner. The title "Tikkabilla" comes from the Hindi word meaning "Hopscotch", a popular children's game.

== Tikkabilla ==
Taking place within a large, colourful house, Tikkabilla is an educational variety series featuring songs, stories, games, and creative activities. A group of rotating presenters, two of whom appear in an episode, present at least two different subjects to a purple dragon puppet named Tamba. Tamba serves as the programme's naïve child where programme's educational content is introduced as the presenters explain things to her.

The show is considered a successor to the BBC's 1964–1988 children's programme Play School and its own successor Playdays. Two of the Tikkabilla presenters, Justin Fletcher and Sarah-Jane Honeywell and Simon Davies and Loran Laidlaw and Paul Ewing Veejay Kaur Toni Frutin Amit Sharma and Beverly Hills, have had prior experience with the format, with Davies presenting Play School in its later years, Laidlaw Frutin Sharma and Ewing Kaur Fletcher portraying Mr Jolly in the Playdays live shows. Play School's famous square, round, and arched windows are again used as a device to transport the viewer from the studio to the outside, real world. Location items, sometimes featuring the presenters and Tamba and usually including young children, introduce the wider world to the young audience.

Occasionally, special guests visit, normally to demonstrate a special skill or performance.

== Presenters ==
Alongside Tamba, who appears in every episode, the presenters rotate from the selection seen below:

- Justin Fletcher
- Sarah-Jane Honeywell
- Simon Davies
- Lorna Laidlaw
- Paul Ewing
- Beverly Hills (Series 1-2)
- Veejay Kaur (Series 3-4)
- Toni Frutin (Series 4)
- Amit Sharma (Series 4)

Tamba is performed by puppeteer Sue Eves, who originally voiced the character in the first two series and wrote many scripts for the series. Alison McGowan (series 2 and 3) and Katherine Smee (series 4) later took over as Tamba's voice.

=== Segments ===
In addition to the mainstream presenter-led portions of the programme, Tikkabilla also features several show-within-a-show segments, normally being showcased within the windows or an item shown below of the Tikkabilla clock. Such segments include:

- Bonny, Banana and Mo: A 2D animated series featuring a girl, her dog, and a bird.
- Higgledy House: A live-action comedy series featuring Sarah-Jane Honeywell and Justin Fletcher Amit Sharma Beverly Hills portraying fictional versions of themselves. The segments were spun off as a standalone programme on CBeebies in 2006.
- Sami's Worlds
- Summerton Mill (Series 4): A stop motion animated series set within a ruined mill. Like Higgledy House, this show was also spun off as a standalone programme on CBeebies and was later pre-sold internationally.

Alongside the segments, the show has occasionally shown clips or stock footage from other educational BBC programmes, mainly from Words and Pictures or Numbertime. One episode once showed an animated clip from Hotch Potch House.

=== Series 1 (2002) ===
- 1. Jungle, Yellow and Melting
- 2. Birds and Weather
- 3. Under the Sea and Sheepdogs
- 4. Dressing Up, Princesses and Castles
- 5. Goldilocks and the Three Bears
- 6. Movement and Gardens
- 7. Kangaroos and Tikkabilla Jive
- 8. Teatime and Ducks
- 9. Musical Instruments and Clocks
- 10. Night-Time Animals and Up and Down
- 11. Families, Photos and Feelings
- 12. Colours, Carnivals and Festivals
- 13. Bears and Dancing
- 14. Seasons, Sculptures and Junk
- 15. Tidy Up, Dressing Up and Shoes
- 16. Ducks, Wheels and Hoildays
- 17. Boats and Opposites
- 18. Ants and Hairbraiding
- 19. Bees and Sweets
- 20. Statues, Cats and Jungle
- 21. Ice Cream and Bowling
- 22. Spiders and Bears
- 23. Jumping, Hopping, Jiving and Delicious Food
- 24. Bears and Different Sizes
- 25. Kittens and Haircuts
- 26. Hide and Seek and Treasure
- 27. Skittles, Bubbles and Balloons
- 28. Opposites and Indian Dancing
- 29. Tiddywinks, Making Masks and Looking in Mirrors
- 30. Colours, Hand Puppets and Guitars
- 31. Horses and Gingerbread
- 32. Opposites, Digging and Dinosaurs
- 33. Jack in the Box, Vegetables and Dressing Up
- 34. Didgeridoos, Loud and Quiet
- 35. Balloons, Feelings and Cows
- 36. Bakers and Tigers
- 37. Trees, Wolves and Robots
- 38. Sweets
- 39. Eating, Growing and Printing
- 40. Blue Animals, Painting and Hokey Cokey
- 41. Ropes and Weather
- 42. Printing and Opposites
- 43. Colours, Tomatoes and Paper Flowers
- 44. Snow and Penguins
- 45. Christmas Special
- 46. Lighthouses and Dinosaurs
- 47. Hats, Sleeping and Breakfast
- 48. Windmills
- 49. Posting Letters
- 50. Animals' Tails, Balancing and Circus
- 51. Meerkats and Teddy Bears Picnic
- 52. Babies, Caterpillars and Guessing
- 53. Shakers, Recycling and Sami's World
- 54. Tidy Up, Marbles and Fish
- 55. Shopping, Rabbits and Five
- 56. Birds and Paper Airplanes
- 57. Windmills, The Princess and the Pea and the Tikkabilla Jive
- 58. Opposites and Cats
- 59. Vegetables, Tulips and Saris
- 60. Boats and the Letter S
- 61. Gardens and Houses
- 62. Rowing and Paddle Boats
- 63. Crisps and Noises
- 64. Gooses and Music
- 65. Snakes, Orangutans and Finger Painting
- 66. Bubbles, Marbles and Animals
- 67. Firefighters and Sea Animals
- 68. Butterflies, Diggers and Beetles
- 69. Night-Time Animals
- 70. Kurdish Dancing, Hiding Animals and Tikkabilla Jive

=== Series 2 (2003) ===
- 1. Stuck in Mud
- 2. Stained Glass and Hoops
- 3. Light and Shadows
- 4. Water
- 5. Animals, Lost and Found
- 6. Buildings and City Animals
- 7. Love, Shops, Counting and Bedtime
- 8. Pop-Up Puppet and Jack-in-the-Box
- 9. Transport and Snakes
- 10. Jelly, Insects and Spoons
- 11. Transport and Homes
- 12. Chicken and Eggs
- 13. Magic
- 14. Garden and Colours
- 15. Weather, Chinese Fans, Beaches and Boats
- 16. Bugs and Soap
- 17. Eid
- 18. Food, Veg Face and Higgledy Pie
- 19. Animals in Trees and Feathers
- 20. City Dwellers, Hot Air Balloons and Shops
- 21. Fish Tank and Patterns
- 22. Face Paint and Dark
- 23. Snow and Bears
- 24. Creepy Crawlies
- 25. Bridges and Transport
- 26. Painting, Sunflowers, Giants, Farms and Scarecrows
- 27. Movement and Noise
- 28. Noisy and Signing
- 29. Art Gallery and Senses
- 30. Umbrellas and Flamenco
- 31. Music, Chocolate and Food
- 32. Steel Bands, Huskies and Drums
- 33. Water and Coins
- 34. Counting and Opposites
- 35. Teddy Bears, Cakes, Shops and Hugs
- 36. Biscuits, Flowers and Tails
- 37. Hobby Horse and Red
- 38. Sheep and Movement
- 39. Snakes and Ladders
- 40. Hedgehogs and Rubbish
- 41. Pancakes and Planes
- 42. Finger Animals, Frogs and Firefighters
- 43. Moving and Painting
- 44. Colours, Trains and Movement
- 45. People Who Help Us
- 46. Big, Deep and Bonny, Banana and Mo Sshhh!
- 47. Mountains, Caves and Weather
- 48. Dinosaurs and Chairs
- 49. Circus and Rocket
- 50. Porridge
- 51. Farm and Harps
- 52. Opposites, Ducks, Recorder and Seashore
- 53. Head to Toe
- 54. Bedtime, Feely and Teapot
- 55. Diwali
- 56. Clocks and Teatime
- 57. Balloons and Hiccups
- 58. Violins and Happy Songs
- 59. Shops and Senses
- 60. Water, Fish and Friends
- 61. Shoes, Animal Sounds, Football and Jungle
- 62. Transport and Bugs
- 63. Sky, Blue and Higgledy
- 64. Photo and Flying
- 65. Pets and Happy
- 66. Noises
- 67. String
- 68. Food and Tidy Up
- 69. Marching, Bridges, Sky and Space
- 70. Friends and Babies

=== Series 3 (2004) ===
- 1. Shops, Rocks and Hands
- 2. Bodies
- 3. Shapes, Maps and Spiders
- 4. Birds, Bears and Dressing Up
- 5. Noises and Food
- 6. Mirrors, Beaches and Boats
- 7. Sick
- 8. Owl and Pussycat
- 9. Fruit, Trees and Birds
- 10. Jobs
- 11. Weather, Harvesting and Animals
- 12. Cakes, Fish and Cars
- 13. Body, Midas, Sandcastles and World
- 14. Rain, Flowers and Finding
- 15. Families, Dogs and Wishes
- 16. High and Jungly
- 17. Clothes and Boats
- 18. Food, Tents and Games
- 19. Big/Small
- 20. Sheep, Dogs, Rockets and Searching
- 21. Dogs, Farms and Clouds
- 22. Flowers, Photos and Paintings
- 23. Transport, Snow and Weather
- 24. Skittles, Hands and Hats
- 25. Wings
- 26. Dogs
- 27. Tall, Small and Textures
- 28. Happy
- 29. Hunting and Noises
- 30. Cola Trees and Green Queens
- 31. Tartan, Decorating and Pets
- 32. Friends, Pairs and Boots
- 33. Elves, Shoes and Cars
- 34. Hands and Seeds
- 35. Transport and Monsters
- 36. Music, Boots and Feet
- 37. Weather
- 38. Shoes and Moving
- 39. Movement, Mouth and Snails
- 40. Families and Flying
- 41. Birds, Fishing and Machines
- 42. Oboes, Jungles and Sharks
- 43. Three Wishes
- 44. Hospitals and Colour
- 45. Lambs and Rabbits
- 46. Feet
- 47. Body, Clothes, Holidays and Jelly
- 48. Sizes and Jobs
- 49. Baskets, Bagpipes & Scottish Dancers
- 50. Opposites, Houses and Farms
- 51. Shapes, Colours and Hands
- 52. Wallpaper
- 53. Food and Siblings
- 54. Movement, Mouth and Snails
- 55. Growing Things
- 56. Weather, Homes and Mice
- 57. Carnival, Clothes and Frogs
- 58. Journeys, Hunting and Games
- 59. Sleeping, Dancing and Moving
- 60. Itchy Animals
- 61. Musical Owls
- 62. Picnic and Patterns
- 63. Trees, Seasons and Fruits
- 64. Dancing and Underwater Life
- 65. Mirrors, Pretending and Food
- 66. Hiccups, Sounds and Homes
- 67. Weather and Boats
- 68. Penguins
- 69. Shapes, Hats and Cars
- 70. Christmas Special

=== Series 4 (2005) ===
- 1. Trampoline
- 2. Dancing Animals
- 3. Honey Biscuits
- 4. School and Stickers
- 5. Ballet, Magic and Pickle
- 6. Liondancers
- 7. Pretend Friend and Sausages
- 8. Tamba's Car
- 9. Stomp
- 10. Suitcase
- 11. Eggs And Sock Thing
- 12. Grumpies and Gravity
- 13. Noisy Big Ears
- 14. Bird Plumage And Mrs Naybhur's Vegetables
- 15. Fruit and Jungle Animals
- 16. Dinosaurs, Elephants and Magic
- 17. Penguins And Wingnuts
- 18. Elephants And Baby Millfreak
- 19. Rapunzel
- 20. Hairbraiding
- 21. Birds of Paradise
- 22. Plasters and Jobs
- 23. Birds and Bagels
- 24. Floating and Treasure
- 25. French and Juggling Feet
- 26. Dog Bathing, Movement and Sea Make
- 27. There Was A Princess Long Ago
- 28. Kite Flying and Pigeons
- 29. Frogs and Bear Hunt
- 30. Walking Holiday
- 31. Birds and Bears
- 32. Tortoises and Houses
- 33. Snowplay
- 34. Messy, Incy and TV
- 35. Getting Around
- 36. Seasons and Ducks
- 37. Camping
- 38. Balancing Things
- 39. Dressing Up and Sharks
- 40. Hide and Seek
- 41. Farm and Penguins
- 42. Dog Agility
- 43. Twins and Sunflowers
- 44. House that Jack Built
- 45. Ferry, Sea and Poem
- 46. Wiggles and Wingnuts
- 47. Rainbow
- 48. Collections
- 49. Dancing Tiger
- 50. Tooty Fruity Lassi
- 51. Grumpy Tamba
- 52. Water Play
- 53. Signs and Odd One Out
- 54. Moon, Eyes and Hands
- 55. Cakes and Bubbles
- 56. Space and Wellies
- 57. Dressing Up and Houses
- 58. Talking with Hands
- 59. Dog Bathing, Movement and Sea
- 60. Green Frog and Three Cornered Hat
- 61. Shapes and Cows
- 62. Special Photo and Dressing Up
- 63. Party Time
- 64. Duke, Frog and Road
- 65. Jungle, Wingnuts and Weather
- 66. Rhythms and Eggs
- 67. Spilt Water and a Hole in My Bucket
- 68. Tamba's Lambs
- 69. Flatpack Bed
- 70. Toys and Babies

== Production ==
Beverly Hills wrote the script for the series, as well as for its sister show The Story Makers. Francis Haines and Liz Kitchen wrote the majority of the programme's music. Francis Haines and Jake Hook co-wrote one of the songs.

== Home media ==
BBC Worldwide released several VHS and DVDs of the series in the United Kingdom.

Title	Release date
Playtime: Introducing Tikkabilla	4 October 2004
Tikkabilla Jive!	12 September 2005
Incy Wincy and Other Stories	26 March 2007
