= You Only Live Twice (Pain album) =

Studio album by Pain
- Released: 3 June 2011 (Europe); 23 June 2011 (North America)
- Genre: Industrial metal
- Length: 40:36
- Label: Nuclear Blast
- Producer: Peter Tägtgren

Pain chronology
Cynic Paradise (2008)	You Only Live Twice (2011)	Coming Home (2016)

You Only Live Twice is the seventh studio album by the industrial metal project Pain, first released on 3 June 2011 via Nuclear Blast Records. It reached number 36 in the Swedish album charts.

== Track listing ==
1. "Let Me Out" – 4:35
2. "Feed the Demons" – 3:54
3. "The Great Pretender" – 4:05
4. "You Only Live Twice" – 4:04
5. "Dirty Woman" – 4:18
6. "We Want More" – 4:46
7. "Leave Me Alone" (Sonic Syndicate cover) – 4:10
8. "Monster" – 4:06
9. "Season of the Reaper" – 6:38

Bonus disc

1. "Crawling Thru Bitterness" – 3:58
2. "The Great Pretender (Millboy & Peka P Remix)" – 3:50
3. "Dirty Woman (MC Raaka Pee Remix)" – 3:44
4. "You Only Live Twice (Rectifier Remix)" – 2:52
5. "Leave Me Alone (Rectifier Remix)" – 3:34
6. "Eleanor Rigby" (Live at Sundown Festival 2008) – 4:25
7. "Follow Me" (Live in Brussels 2009) – 4:45
8. "I Don't Care" (Live at Raismes Festival 2009) – 2:53
9. "Bitch" (Live at Raismes Festival 2009) – 4:40
10. "Unchain the Time" – 3:39

== Charts ==
Chart (2008)	Peak position
Austrian Albums Chart	75
Finnish Albums Chart	26
German Albums Chart	40
Swedish Albums Chart	36
Swiss Albums Chart	64
