= Cynic Paradise =

Studio album by Pain
- Released: 31 October 2008
- Studio: Abyss studio, Pärlby, Sweden
- Genre: Industrial metal
- Length: 42:27
- Label: Nuclear Blast
- Producer: Peter Tägtgren

Pain chronology
Psalms of Extinction (2007)	Cynic Paradise (2008)	You Only Live Twice (2011)

Cynic Paradise is the sixth studio album by the Swedish industrial metal project Pain, released on 31 October 2008 via Nuclear Blast. It reached No. 30 on the Swedish album charts.

The album features a duet with then-Nightwish singer Anette Olzon in the songs "Follow Me" and "Feed Us". Disc 2 features a Depeche Mode cover and remixes. The artwork was created by renowned artist Travis Smith (Devin Townsend, Amorphis, Opeth, Nevermore).

The North American version was released on 8 June 2010 with bonus live disc and alternative cover.

== Critical reception ==
Professional ratings
Review scores
Source	Rating
AllMusic	3.5/5 stars

In a review for AllMusic, Alex Henderson described the album as "an engaging disc even though it doesn't pretend to break any new ground for industrial metal."

== Track listing ==
1. "I'm Going In" – 3:16
2. "Monkey Business" – 4:05
3. "Follow Me" (feat. Anette Olzon) – 4:17
4. "Have a Drink on Me" – 3:53
5. "Don't Care" – 2:42
6. "Reach Out (and Regret)" – 3:55
7. "Generation X" – 4:18
8. "No One Knows" – 3:50
9. "Live Fast / Die Young" – 3:42
10. "Not Your Kind" – 4:10
11. "Feed Us" (feat. Anette Olzon) – 4:14

Bonus tracks

12. "Behind the Wheel" (Depeche Mode cover) – 4:09
13. "Here Is the News" (Electric Light Orchestra cover) – 3:52
14. "Follow Me (Peter Vox Version)" – 4:08
15. "Clouds of Ecstasy Bassflow Remix)" – 3:29
16. "No One Knows (Rectifier Remix)" – 3:45

Spinefarm Records UK

12. "Follow Me" (Peter Vox Version)" – 4:08
13. "Clouds of Ecstasy (Bassflow Remix)" – 3:29
14. "No One Knows (Rectifier Remix)" – 3:45
15. "Trapped" – 3:40

== Charts ==
Chart (2008)	Peak position
Finnish Albums (Suomen virallinen lista)	28
French Albums (SNEP)	165
German Albums (Offizielle Top 100)	78
Japanese Albums (Oricon)	188
Swedish Albums (Sverigetopplistan)	30
