= Come Home =

Come Home may refer to:

== Albums ==
- Come Home (Annbjørg Lien and Bjørn Ole Rasch album) or the title song, 2009
- Come Home (Luminate album) or the title song, 2011
- Come Home (video), a 2008 video album by The Feeling

== Songs ==
- "Come Home" (IAMX song), 2013
- "Come Home" (James song), 1989
- "Come Home" (OneRepublic song), 2009, covered by Faith Hill (2011)
- "Come Home" (Placebo song), 1996
- "Come Home" (Sons of Zion song), 2019
- "(I Want to) Come Home", by Paul McCartney, 2009
- "Come Home", by Anderson Paak from Ventura
- "Come Home", by Antix
- "Come Home", by The Dismemberment Plan from Change
- "Come Home", by Emyli
- "Come Home", by Freddy Mullins
- "Come Home", by OceanLab from Sirens of the Sea
- "Come Home", by Trace Adkins from Chrome
- "Ghar Aaja Pardesi" (transl. Come Home), by Jatin–Lalit, Manpreet Kaur and Pamela Chopra from the 1995 Indian film Dilwale Dulhania Le Jayenge

== Other uses ==
- Come Home (TV series), a 2018 BBC TV series starring Christopher Eccleston
- Come Home, a 2012 novel by Lisa Scottoline

== See also ==
- Come Back Home (disambiguation)
- Come On Home (disambiguation)
- Coming Home (disambiguation)
