= Come Back, Little Sheba =

Come Back, Little Sheba may refer to:

- Come Back, Little Sheba (play), a play by William Inge
- Come Back, Little Sheba (1952 film), a film based on the play, starring Burt Lancaster and Shirley Booth
- Come Back, Little Sheba (1977 film), a television film adaptation of the play, starring Laurence Olivier and Joanne Woodward
- "Come Back Little Sheba", a song by Patti Smith, a B-side from the single "Summer Cannibals"
