= Coming Home (Yungchen Lhamo album) =

Studio album by Yungchen Lhamo
- Released: 1998
- Studio: Real World
- Length: 52:04
- Label: Real World
- Producer: Hector Zazou

Yungchen Lhamo chronology
Tibet, Tibet (1996)	Coming Home (1998)	Ama (2006)

Coming Home is an album by the Tibetan musician Yungchen Lhamo, released in 1998 on Real World Records. It was her first album to be released in the United States; she had broken through to American audiences after playing the 1997 Lilith Fair and appearing on the soundtrack to Seven Years in Tibet. Lhamo supported the album by playing a 1998 benefit for Tibet House US as well as the WOMAD festival. Coming Home was banned in Tibet.

== Production ==
Recorded at Real World Studios, the album was produced by Hector Zazou, who also helped to arrange the songs. Zazou employed vocal effects and looped samples. David Rhodes played guitar on Coming Home; Peter Gabriel and Hossam Ramzy also contributed. Coming Home was Lhamo's first album where the majority of the songs were not performed a cappella. Lhamo wrote all of the songs, many of which are about the sadness of exile. "Ngak Pai Metog" is dedicated to the Dalai Lama.

== Critical reception ==
Professional ratings
Review scores
Source	Rating
AllMusic	4/5 stars
The Daily Telegraph	7.5/10
The Encyclopedia of Popular Music	3/5 stars
Los Angeles Daily News	3.5/4 stars
MusicHound World: The Essential Album Guide	3.5/5 stars

The Independent determined that, "while its themes—loneliness, hope, compassion and resolve—remain constant, it's a surprisingly experimental effort, mixing guitars, violins, drones and electronics in with Yungchen Lhamo's ethereal vocals." JazzTimes wrote: "The project's best moments have to do with her voice, plaintive and glorious, as with the thickly layered vocal matrix of 'Ngak Pai Metog' and the melancholic enigma of her swooping lines in 'Dream'." The Courier-Mail concluded that "cynics who don't understand what the fascination in the West with Tibet is all about should close their eyes and listen to Yungchen Lhamo... She has a voice that is straight from heaven."

The Observer noted that "the sense of stillness and endurance is profound." The Los Angeles Daily News opined that "Lhamo's voice is as clear and cool as glacial ice, as quiet and lonely as a shepherd in a mountainside meadow." The New York Times stated that, "whether singing in English or wordlessly shouting, Ms. Lhamo keeps her focus on the essentially Tibetan themes of compassion and liberation."

AllMusic wrote that Lhamo "has some musical accompaniment, mostly soft and acoustic... Her sweet and gentle soprano is still the main attraction."

== Track listing ==
Coming Home track listing
No.	Title	Length
1.	"Happiness Is..."	5:06
2.	"Sky"	5:48
3.	"Heart"	7:36
4.	"Per Rig Chog Sum"	4:46
5.	"Khyab Sangye"	6:23
6.	"Ngak Pai Metog"	3:06
7.	"Dream"	4:29
8.	"Defiance"	6:49
9.	"Coming Home"	8:01
Total length:		52:04

== Charts ==
Chart performance for Coming Home
Chart (1999)	Peak position
Australian Albums (ARIA)	91
