= Back Home Again =

Back Home Again may refer to:

- Back Home Again (John Denver album), 1974
  - "Back Home Again" (song), the title song
- Back Home Again (Kenny Rogers album), 1991
- Back Home Again, a 1976 album by Humble Pie
- Back Home Again (film), a 1952 film produced by Shaw Brothers Studio
- Back Home Again (Rhonda Vincent album), 2000
- Back Home Again, a 2004 comedy starring Brett Harrelson, Petra Areskoug, and Williamson Howe
- Back Home Again, a 2021 2D animated short film based on the events of the 2016 Fort McMurray wildfire
