= Comeback season =

Comeback season may refer to:

- Comeback Season (film), a 2006 American film
- Comeback Season (mixtape), a 2007 Drake mixtape
