= 愛回家 =

愛回家 may refer to:

- Come Home Love (愛·回家), Hong Kong sitcom series created and produced by TVB
- "Love Coming Home" (愛回家), a track in 2007 album Moments by Leo Ku

== See also ==
- The dictionary definition of 愛 at Wiktionary
- The dictionary definition of 回家 at Wiktionary
