= Homegoing (disambiguation) =

Homegoing is an African-American funeral tradition.

Homegoing may also refer to:

- Homegoing (Gyasi novel), a 2016 novel by Yaa Gyasi
- Homegoing (Pohl novel), a 1989 novel by Frederik Pohl
- Homegoings (film), a 2013 documentary film
