= Come Back Home =

Come Back Home may refer to:

- "Come Back Home" (Seo Taiji and Boys song), 1995
- "Come Back Home" (Pete Yorn song), 2003
- "Come Back Home" (2NE1 song), 2014
- "Come Back Home" (Sofia Carson song), 2022
- "Come Back Home", a 2017 remake of Seo Taiji and Boys by BTS
- "Come Back Home", a 2024 song by Noga Erez from The Vandalist
- "Come Back Home", a 2020 song by Oneus
- "Come Back Home", a 2021 song by Stan Walker from All In
- Come Back Home (film), a 2022 South Korean comedy
- "Ghar Aaja Pardesi" (transl. Come Back Home), a song by Jatin–Lalit, Manpreet Kaur and Pamela Chopra from the 1995 Indian film Dilwale Dulhania Le Jayenge
- "Come Back Home", a 2010 song by Two Door Cinema Club

== See also ==
- Come Home (disambiguation)
- Comeback (disambiguation)
- Back Home (disambiguation)
