= Coming Home (Pain album) =

Studio album by Pain
- Released: 9 September 2016
- Genre: Industrial metal
- Length: 41:21
- Label: Nuclear Blast
- Producer: Peter Tägtgren

Pain chronology
You Only Live Twice (2011)	Coming Home (2016)	I Am (2024)

Coming Home is the eighth studio album by the Swedish industrial metal project Pain, released on 9 September 2016 via Nuclear Blast Records.

== Track listing ==
No.	Title	Length
1.	"Designed to Piss You Off"	3:53
2.	"Call Me" (featuring Joakim Brodén)	4:13
3.	"A Wannabe"	4:15
4.	"Pain in the Ass"	4:06
5.	"Black Knight Satellite"	3:40
6.	"Coming Home"	4:43
7.	"Absinthe-Phoenix Rising"	3:42
8.	"Final Crusade"	3:55
9.	"Natural Born Idiot"	4:17
10.	"Starseed"	4:45
11.	"Me against the Universe (bonus track vinyl)"	3:12
Total length:		41:21

== Charts ==
Chart (2016)	Peak position
Austrian Albums (Ö3 Austria)	29
Belgian Albums (Ultratop Flanders)	83
Belgian Albums (Ultratop Wallonia)	54
Finnish Albums (Suomen virallinen lista)	14
French Albums (SNEP)	117
German Albums (Offizielle Top 100)	25
Swedish Albums (Sverigetopplistan)	40
Swiss Albums (Schweizer Hitparade)	23
