= Blake (band) =

British band

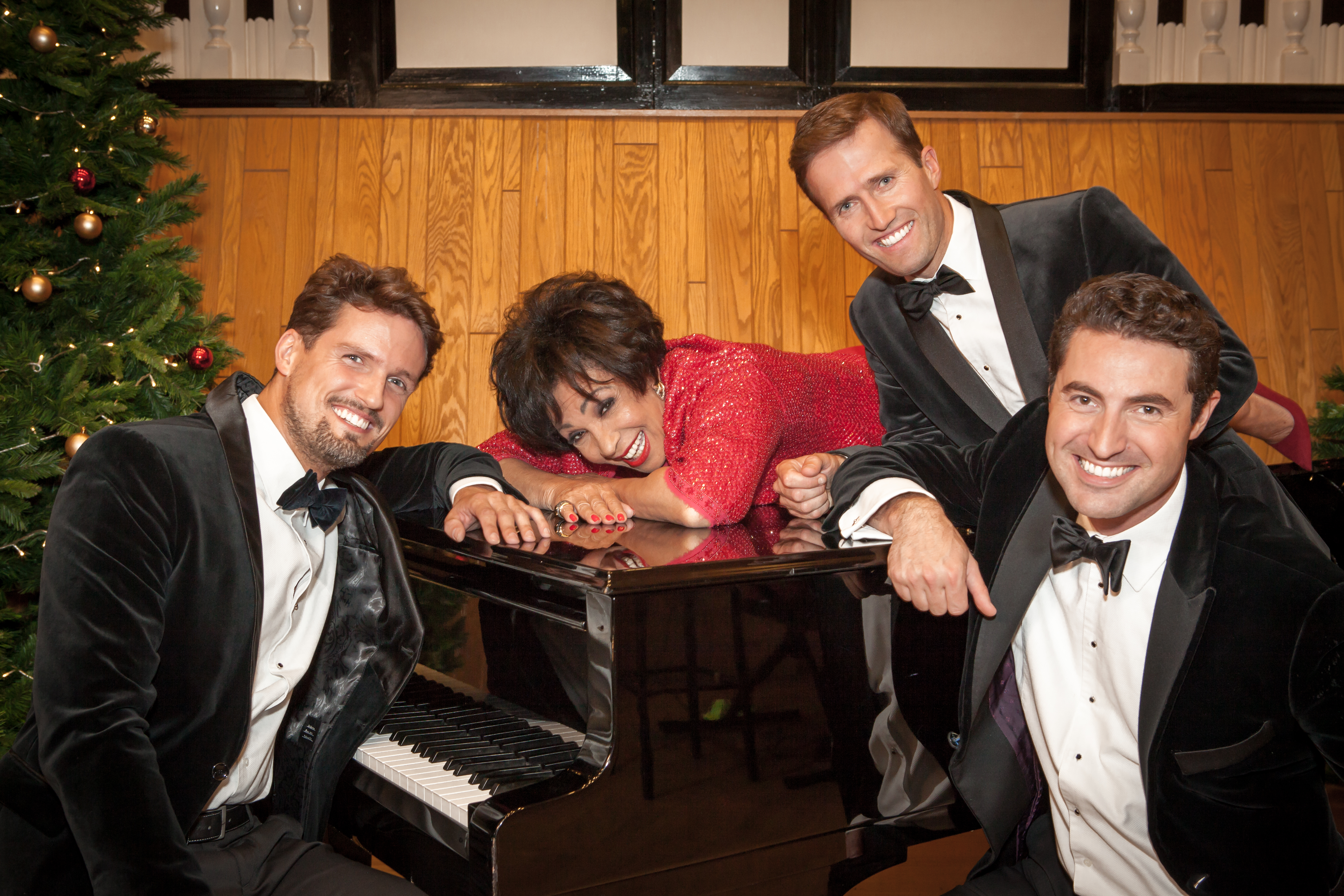
- Baines, Bowman and Berney with Dame Shirley Bassey

Background information
- Origin: United Kingdom
- Genres: Classical, crossover
- Years active: 2007–present
- Labels: Universal Classics and Jazz, Blake Records
- Members: Ollie Baines; Stephen Bowman; Humphrey Berney
- Past members: Dominic Tighe; Jules Knight
- Website: www.blakeofficial.com

Blake are a British vocal group. Blake comprises three men whose friendship and musical careers date back to their schooldays. After reuniting via Facebook as adults, they recorded their first album in six months. That album, Blake, went straight to number one on the UK Classical Album Chart and into the top twenty album chart. Their career took off with a series of highlights, some of which are recorded below.

== History ==
2008-2009

The first album, Blake, received the Classical Brit Award for Album of the Year in 2008. Their second album, And So It Goes, peaked at No. 12 in the UK album chart and No.1 in several classical charts around the world. During 2008 and 2009 the group undertook tours of Australia and Japan. 2009 continued with a tour, the creation of their new record label, Blake Records, and the release of their third album, Together.

2010

In 2010 "Beautiful Earth" was selected by the World Wildlife Fund as its Earth Hour Anthem, and their album Together reached No. 1 in the Australian Classical Charts and No. 1 in the South African Classical Charts. Blake took their ‘An Evening With Blake’ show to over 40 locations throughout the UK. They were invited to Buckingham Palace twice.

2011

Blake released ‘All of Me’. They had over 90 live concert appearances, début tours of the Philippines and Russia and they headlined the Henley Festival. They also performed for Prince Albert and Princess Charlene of Monaco.

2012

In addition to long hours in the recording studio working on their fourth album the group also found time for a performance at the Olympic Stadium in the run-up to the 2012 Games.

2013

Blake launched their fourth album, Start Over. The year also saw performances at Wembley Stadium for the Rugby League Cup final, the group's first play-listed song on BBC Radio 2 ("So Happy"), tours to Indonesia and Trinidad & Tobago plus the launch of their first Asia-only album. Towards the end of 2013 the band launched two charity singles. "You Raise Me Up" was recorded with the soprano Camilla Kerslake and the Sing to Beat Breast Cancer Choir. "To the Sun" was released in November and debuted live in Trafalgar Square as the anthem for the launch of the Walking with the Wounded South Pole challenge in the presence of Prince Harry.

2014

After a series of tours and concerts Blake released their fifth album, In Harmony.

2015

Blake again toured throughout the UK. They also played at the famous Holders Festival in Barbados. They funded their first independent album, A Classic Christmas, on PledgeMusic.

The 2015 Christmas Special

Blake teamed up with Dame Shirley Bassey for a version of "The Christmas Song (Chestnuts Roasting on an Open Fire)" which appeared on their first Christmas album.

The Anniversary Album

In Spring 2018 Blake celebrated their 10th anniversary with a brand-new album recorded in collaboration with the Central Band of the RAF and singers from the Military Wives Choirs. The thirteen-track album was recorded in various locations around the UK, notably RAF Northolt and Sonica Studios. The album was partly funded by Blake fans from all over the world via PledgeMusic with a percentage of all funds raised going to the RAF charitable trust. This was Blake's first classically eligible album since the release of Together in 2009 on Blake/EMI records.

== Current members ==
=== Oliver Baines ===
Oliver "Ollie" Baines (tenor), born 23 November 1982 in Oxford, received classical music training from the age of 8 as a chorister at both New College, Oxford and Winchester Cathedral. He was educated at New College School, a private school in Oxford, to which he won a choral scholarship, followed by The Pilgrim’s School, Winchester, then Marlborough College, an independent school in the market town of Marlborough, Wiltshire. He was a member of the National Youth Choir of Great Britain from 1999 until 2005. Aside from vocal training, Baines also learned the French Horn and the trumpet, as well as the piano. He studied degrees in Music and Music Technology, and whilst at university sang with the choirs of Magdalene College, Cambridge and Trinity College, Cambridge before going on to study at the British Institute of Florence and the Guildhall School of Music and Drama. He was formerly a Maths and English Tutor. He has been producer of many of Blake’s later records, as well as de facto musical director.

=== Humphrey Berney ===
Humphrey "Barney" Berney (tenor), born Humphrey Berney on 26 July 1980, is a classically trained opera singer who joined the group in 2009 to replace Dominic Tighe. He made his recording debut on Hayley Westenra's album Treasure. Berney was educated at Taverham Hall School, a private school in the city of Norwich in Norfolk in eastern England, followed by Gresham's School, an independent school in the market town of Holt (also in Norfolk), and completed his training at the Royal Academy of Music in 2005. He has sung throughout Europe. Operatic roles include Macheath (The Beggars Opera), Alfred (Die Fledermaus) and Monostatos (The Magic Flute) for Glyndebourne Opera and Garsington Opera. Barney also appeared in Channel 4's opera film View from the Moon. Following a search on the social networking website Twitter, Barney joined the group in February 2009.

=== Stephen Bowman ===
Stephen Bowman (bass-baritone), born 22 August 1980 in Bath. Both of his parents were musicians. Bowman was educated at St. Stephen's Church of England Primary School in Bath, followed by Prior Park College. After his voice broke and the head of music at Prior Park College heard him singing, Bowman auditioned for a place in the school's chapel choir. He trained as a baritone and joined blues and rock bands in the Bath area. He began songwriting and creating electronic music in a home studio. In 1997, he secured a place at the Guildhall School of Music & Drama when he was 17 years old, making him the youngest baritone offered a place by the school. Bowman left before the start of his 4th year to undertake an experimental recording project with Sony Classical records called Coeur de Lion - a classical 5-piece male singing group that covered light opera classics. Later, he moved back to Bath and pursued computing and marketing while continuing to write and record music. In 2005, he finished a collection of songs with the help of previous members of Tears for Fears. In 2007, he became a founding member of Blake after running into Baines. In 2016, he started a virtual reality company, producing experiences based on music, gaming and relaxation.

== Previous members ==
=== Dominic Tighe ===
Dominic Tighe (baritone), born 20 April 1983 in Devon, is a singer and established actor. He was educated at Newton Ferrers Primary School in Plymouth in Devon, and became a chorister at Buckfast Abbey School in Buckfastleigh, followed by Downside School, an independent school in Stratton-on-the-Fosse in Somerset, where he recorded three albums at Downside Abbey. He sang at the Queen's private 80th birthday celebrations, and has also sung for Prince Edward and Nelson Mandela. He was a member of the National Youth Theatre for seven years, before studying at the Central School of Speech and Drama. After graduating, Tighe was acting for two years, working with Alan Ayckbourn, Edward Hall and Kevin Spacey, among others. He was on a world tour with the Old Vic before the group recorded Blake's debut album. In 2009, Tighe announced that he was leaving the band to return to his acting career. In 2010 he appeared in Trevor Nunn's revival of Andrew Lloyd Webber's Aspects of Love at the Menier Chocolate Factory and, in 2014, he appeared in the musical Sunny Afternoon, based on the career of The Kinks.

== Discography ==
- Blake (2007) - #18 UK
- And So It Goes (2008) - #14 UK, #58 AUS
- Together (2009) - #38 UK #96 AUS
- The OPM Album (EP) (2013)
- A Classic Christmas (2015)

Blake

Studio album by Blake
- Released: 5 November 2007
- Genre: Classical crossover
- Label: Universal Classics and Jazz
- Producer: Nick Patrick

Blake chronology
''Blake'' (2007)	And So It goes (2008)

=== Blake (2007) ===
Following numerous television appearances, and singing at venues as diverse as Twickenham Stadium and Waterloo railway station, the group were caught up in a "whirlwind of public attention". Celebrities such as Keira Knightley, Will Smith, Ewan McGregor all proclaimed their support for the band, and Hans Zimmer asked them to sing on the soundtrack to The Da Vinci Code film sequel, Angels & Demons, after hearing their arrangement of his theme for Gladiator.

Their debut album was released on 5 November 2007 and immediately went to the top of the UK Classical Album charts, and reached the top 20 of the UK Pop Album chart. The "polished fusion" of classical and pop, as heard in arrangements of the Beach Boys' hit "God Only Knows", the themes to Gladiator, 1492: Conquest of Paradise and several classical favourites recorded with the Royal Philharmonic Orchestra proved a huge hit, and the album went Gold within three weeks. Early in 2008, the album was nominated for a Classical BRIT Award and was named "Album of the Year" in May. It was only the second time in nine years that the award for best album, as voted for by listeners to Classic FM, was won by a debut album (following Russell Watson's The Voice in 2001).

==== Track list ====
1. "Yo Te Voy Amar (I'll Make Love To You)"
2. "In Paradisium (Gladiator)"
3. "Moon River"
4. "1492 Conquest of Paradise"
5. "God Only Knows"
6. "I Knew I Loved You (Deborah's Theme)"
7. "Hallelujah"
8. "Ashokan Farewell"
9. "Celebration"
10. "Vide Cor Meum"
11. "Swing Low Sweet Chariot"
12. "E Sara Cosi"
13. "Jerusalem"
14. "Toglimi Il Respiro (Take My Breath Away)"
15. Bonus Track: "In the Bleak Midwinter"

And So It Goes

Studio album by Blake
- Released: 29 September 2008
- Genre: Classical crossover
- Label: Universal Classics and Jazz
- Producer: Stephen Lipson

Blake chronology
Blake (2007)	''And So It Goes'' (2008)	Together (2009)

=== And So It Goes (2008) ===
Blake's second album contains a wider range of material than the debut album. There are no film score arrangements this time, but tracks range from "Chasing Cars" by Snow Patrol, through to the arrangement of "Sancta Maria" from the opera Cavalleria Rusticana and the negro-spiritual "Steal Away". Knight explained that the album has "a different sound to it, it's more contemporary, more pop-py. Combining both classical sounds and pop sounds is a winning combination, and we’ve taken it a lot further on this album."

==== Track list ====
1. "Look to the Mountains"
2. "And So It Goes"
3. "Chasing Cars"
4. "Wild Mountain Thyme"
5. "Because We Believe"
6. "Up Where We Belong"
7. "Steal Away"
8. "Heaven Can Wait"
9. "Closest Thing to Crazy"
10. "Fantasia Prelude"
11. "Nella Fantasia"
12. "Time to Say Goodbye"
13. "Sancta Maria" (Intermezzo from Cavalleria Rusticana by Mascagni)

Together

Studio album by Blake
- Released: 12 October 2009
- Genre: Classical crossover
- Label: Blake Records, EMI
- Producer: Nick Patrick

Blake chronology
And So It Goes (2008)	''Together'' (2009)

=== Together (2009) ===
The third album, Together, and the first to include Berney, was released on 12 October. The album again contains tracks from several genres, including opera, musical theatre, film themes and pop songs. The album was recorded with the City of Prague Philharmonic Orchestra with arranger Paul Bateman, once again produced by Nick Patrick and Adrian Munsey. The album was nominated for "Album of the Year" at the 2010 Classical BRITs. The album was released on the band's own independent label, Blake Records, distributed by EMI Label Services.

==== Track list ====
1. "With or Without You" – U2
2. "Bring Him Home" (Les Misérables)
3. "Bridge over Troubled Water" – Paul Simon
4. "Abide with Me"
5. "La Califfa" – Ennio Morricone
6. "She" (featuring Julian Smith, saxophone) – Charles Aznavour
7. "I Vow To Thee, My Country" – Gustav Holst
8. "She Was Beautiful (Cavatina)" – Stanley Myers
9. "Ave Maria" – Bach/Gounod
10. "Nessun Dorma" (Turandot) – Giacomo Puccini
11. "Unsung Hero" (featuring Caroline Redman Lusher) – Denise Rich
12. "Titans" - Vangelis
13. "When a Child Is Born" – Johnny Mathis (Christmas bonus track)

Special edition (remixed and remastered), released 22 March 2010.

14. "Here's to the Heroes" – John Barry (Band of Brothers theme)
15. "Voice of an Angel"
16. "Beautiful Earth"
