= Come On Home =

Come On Home may refer to:

- Come On Home (album), a 1997 album by Boz Scaggs
- "Come On Home" (Cyndi Lauper song), 1995
- "Come on Home", a song by Everything but the Girl, from the album Baby, the Stars Shine Bright (1986)
- "Come On Home" (Titanium song), 2012
- "Come On Home", a song by Jesus Jones from the album Never Enough: The Best of Jesus Jones
- "Come On Home", a song by Franz Ferdinand from the album Franz Ferdinand
