= The Soldiers =

- Years active: 2009–present
- Label: Demon Music Group / Warner Bros. Records
- Members: (Sergeant Major) Gary Chilton (Staff Sergeant) Richie Maddocks (Corporal) Ryan Idzi
- Website: Official website

The Soldiers is a singing trio consisting of serving British Army soldiers, whose debut album, Coming Home, was released on 26 October 2009, and who have since continued their singing career whilst remaining full-time army personnel. Signed to CPW Productions Warner Bros. Records, the trio consists of Ryan Idzi, Richie Maddocks and Gary Chilton.

The Soldiers' first national interview was with The Sun, with a free download of the lead song "Coming Home" from the debut album Coming Home. The song was written by Jake Hook, Nick Patrick and Jeff Chegwin. It was delivered as a free download for 48 hours through The Sun website as a promotion for the forthcoming album. Proceeds from the single were donated to The Army Benevolent Fund. The Soldiers were also featured in Big Sing 2009, hosted by Aled Jones from London's Royal Albert Hall, with special guests also including Bryn Terfel, Ruby Turner, Amy Nuttall. The show was broadcast on BBC TV on 25 October 2009.

The Soldiers have released four studio albums, Coming Home (2009), Letters Home (2010), Message to You (2011) and the self-titled The Soldiers (2012) and two compilation album Best of The Soldiers (2011) and Greatest (2013).

== Members ==
- Sergeant Major Gary Chilton lives in Andover, Hampshire and joined the Army in 1984. He served in the Gulf War and as of November 2010 is Band Sergeant Major of the Army Air Corps.
- Staff Sergeant Richie Maddocks was born in Oldham, Greater Manchester, and attended South Chadderton Secondary School where he played in the school band, and the Jazz band, plus varies lead roles in school plays and concerts. He joined the Army at the age of 16. He is also a Gulf War veteran and as of November 2010 is Drum Major of the Minden Band of the Queen's Division.
- Corporal Ryan Idzi (born 1985) was born in Caerphilly, Wales, and is of Polish ancestry. In 2007, he appeared in season 4 of the UK The X Factor, auditioning with "Lean on Me". He reached the "Bootcamp" stages of the competition. A member of the 1st The Queen's Dragoon Guards, he has served in Afghanistan and Iraq as a member of the 20th Armoured Brigade.

== Discography ==
=== Studio albums ===
Album Title	Album details	Peak chart positions	Certifications (sales threshold)
Album Title	Album details	UK	Certifications (sales threshold)
Coming Home	Released: 26 October 2009; Label: Rhino Records; Formats: CD, digital download	4	UK: 2× Platinum
Letters Home	Released: 25 October 2010; Label: Rhino Records; Formats: CD, digital download	10	UK: Platinum
Message to You	Released: 24 October 2011; Label: DMG TV; Formats: CD, digital download	11	UK: Gold
The Soldiers	Released: 28 October 2012; Label: DMG TV; Formats: CD, digital download	23	

Special album releases

Album Title	Album details	Peak chart positions	Notes
Album Title	Album details	UK	Notes
Love Songs	Released: 31 January 2010; Label: Upfront / The Mail on Sunday; Formats: CD distributed free with The Mail on Sunday	–	Track list: 1. "Don't Let the Sun Go Down on Me" (Elton John, Bernie Taupin (4:45); 2. "I Don't Want to Talk About It" (Danny Whitten) (3:42); 3. "Three Times a Lady" (Lionel Richie) (4:16); 4. "I'll Stand by You" (Billy Steinberg, Chrissie Hynde, Tom Kelly) (4:15); 5. "Hero" (Mariah Carey, Walter Afanasieff) (4:26); 6. "(Everything I Do) I Do It for You" (Bryan Adams, Michael Kamen, Robert John "Mutt" Lange) (4:05); 7. "This Old Heart of Mine (Is Weak for You)" (Holland-Dozier-Holland, Sylvia May; 8. "Can't Help Falling in Love (With You)" (George David Weiss, Hugo Peretti, Luigi Creatore) (3:40); 9. "Fields of Gold" (Gordon Sumner) (3:18); 10. "When I Need You" (Albert Hammond, Carole Bayer Sager) (4:32); 11. "Against All Odds" featuring Caroline Redman Lusher (Phil Collins (3:18); 12. "Bridge over Troubled Water" (Paul Simon) (4:14)
Christmas With the Soldiers	Released: 17 December 2012; Label: Demon Music Group; Formats: CD	–	Track list: 1. "Frosty the Snowman" (2:44); 2. "Rudolph the Red-Nosed Reindeer" (2:26); 3. "I Wish It Could Be Christmas Everyday" (3:37); 4. "It's Beginning to Look a Lot Like Christmas" (2:42); 5. "Jingle Bells" (3:20); 6. "Merry Xmas Everybody" (3:24); 7. "Rockin' Around the Christmas Tree" (2:08); 8. "Santa Claus Is Coming to Town" (2:48); 9. "Winter Wonderland" (2:20); 10. "Let It Snow" (1:56); 11. "White Christmas" (1:25); 12. "Home Coming (Christmas Mix)" (3:42); 13. "Little Drummer Boy" (2:44)

=== Compilation albums ===
Album Title	Album details	Peak chart positions	Notes
Album Title	Album details	UK	Notes
Best of The Soldiers	Released: 14 October 2011; Label: Demon Music Group; Formats: CD	–	Track list: 1. "Great British Hero" - 4:41; 2. "Coming Home" (LP Version) - 4:07; 3. "Hero" - 4:25; 4. "Against All Odds" (LP Version) - 3:18; 5. "Don't Let the Sun Go Down on Me" - 4:45; 6. "Letters Home" - 3:05; 7. "Three Times a Lady" - 4:17; 8. "You're in My Heart" - 4:01; 9. "Tears in Heaven" (LP Version) - 4:25; 10. "Pennies from Heaven" (Chelsea Pensioners) - 3:42; 11. "I'll Stand by You" (LP Version) - 4:17; 12. "You Raise Me Up" - 3:51; 13. "Fields of Gold" - 3:19; 14. "I Will Carry You" - 3:56; 15. "Your Song" - 3:52; 16. "With a Little Help from My Friends" (LP Version) - 3:37; 17. "Bridge Over Troubled Water" (LP Version) - 4:12; 18. "While We're Away" - 2:43; 19. "Requiem for a Soldier" - 3:42
Greatest	Released: 2 September 2013; Label: Demon Music Group; Formats: CD	–	Track list: 1. "I've Gotta Get a Message to You" (with Robin Gibb) - 3:19; 2. "Dance with My Father" - 4:25; 3. "Healing Hands" - 3:57; 4. "Father and Son" - 2:50; 5. "She" (with Charles Aznavour) - 3:43; 6. "Amazed" - 4:01; 7. "I Have a Dream" - 4:58; 8. "Through the Barricades" - 6:16; 9. "Desperado" - 3:36; 10. "If Tomorrow Never Comes" - 3:37; 11. "Make You Feel My Love" - 3:33; 12. "I've Gotta Get a Message to You" (Full Instrumental Version) - 3:17

=== Singles ===
Year	Single	Chart peak positions	Album
Year	Single	UK	Album
2009	"Coming Home"	—	Coming Home
2009	"A Soldier's Christmas Letter"	65	Coming Home
2010	"Letters Home"	—	Letters Home
2011	"I've Gotta Get a Message to You" (with Robin Gibb)	75	Message to You
