= Nick Patrick (music producer) =

British record producer (born 1957)

- Born: Nicholas Patrick; 28 December 1957 (age 68); London, England
- Occupation: Record producer
- Years active: 1979-present
- Website: nickpatrickproductions.com

Nicholas Patrick (born 28 December 1957) is a British record producer. He has produced albums for artists such as Seal, Aretha Franklin, the Beach Boys, Placido Domingo, and Andrea Bocelli, received three Grammy Award nominations and won eight Album of the Year Classic BRIT Awards.

He owns and runs a recording studio in Salisbury, England, and has been signed to EMI Music Publishing since 2006.

== Early life ==
Nick Patrick was born in London. His father, Victor Patrick, was a journalist of Russian and Scottish descent who became deputy editor of the Sunday Express newspaper. His mother, Beth Patrick, also a journalist, was an Australian national who immigrated at age 33 to the UK.

He attended the Westminster Under School in London, Millfield in Somerset, and Emanuel College in London, where he played in various bands.

== Career ==
Patrick's music career began in earnest at Lansdowne Studios in London, where he worked first as a runner, then as a recording engineer, engineering on Gerry Rafferty's 1979 album Night Owl, among others. He went on to work as a recording engineer at Odyssey Studios, for example on Marvin Gaye's 1981 album In Our Lifetime?, and as a freelancer.

Around 1984 he began producing albums. During the late 1980s and 1990s he produced recordings by numerous international and world music artists, including Mory Kanté, the Gipsy Kings, Salif Keita, Youssou N'Dour, Miriam Makeba, and Hugh Masekela. His first Grammy nomination came for the Gipsy Kings' 1991 album Este Mundo.

Beginning in 1991, he also began specializing in producing classical and opera crossover artists, beginning with tenor Russell Watson's album The Voice. He has gone on to produce, mix, and arrange recordings by Il Divo, Bryn Terfel, Hans Zimmer, Jonas Kaufmann, 2Cellos, Hayley Westenra, Jackie Evancho, and others.

In 2020, Patrick collaborated with Dame Shirley Bassey on her album I Owe It All to You. Recording took place in London, Prague, Monaco and the South of France during the COVID-19 pandemic, under travel and recording restrictions.

=== Awards ===
Between 2001 and 2018, albums he produced – by Blake, Katherine Jenkins, Russell Watson, Michael Ball and Alfie Boe, and Elvis Presley – won a total of eight Classic BRIT Awards and six UK #1 awards.

In April 2020, Hauser's album Classic went to number one on Billboard's "Traditional Classical Albums" chart. His second Grammy-nominated project was the West Side Story 50th Anniversary recording released in 2007 (Best Musical Show Album). His third Grammy nomination (Traditional Pop Vocal Album) came for the album Standards by Seal.

=== Orchestral projects ===
Patrick has specialised in producing projects that combine original recorded vocals by classic singers and groups with new orchestral arrangements. These artists include Aretha Franklin (Aretha Franklin with the Royal Philharmonic Orchestra, A Brand New Me), Johnny Cash (Johnny Cash With The Royal Philharmonic Orchestra), Bing Crosby (Bing Crosby and The London Symphony Orchestra, Bing At Christmas), Buddy Holly (Buddy Holly with the Royal Philharmonic Orchestra, True Love Ways), Elvis Presley (If I Can Dream, The Wonder Of You, Christmas with the Royal Philharmonic Orchestra), Roy Orbison (A Love So Beautiful, Unchained Melodies), the Beach Boys, and The Carpenters.

=== Ball & Boe ===
Nick Patrick is the official producer for all projects under Decca Records' Ball & Boe brand with Michael Ball and Alfie Boe. He has produced all four Ball & Boe collaborative album projects: Together, Together Again, Back Together, and Together At Christmas. Each of these projects has gone Top 10 in the Official UK Charts, with two No.1 UK albums. In 2018, Together Again was awarded Classic FM Album of the Year at the Classic BRIT Awards. As of October 2020, these albums have received three BPI Platinum and one BPI Gold certifications. Their fourth collaboration Together At Christmas is set for release in November 2020. Patrick also produced each of Michael Ball and Alfie Boe's most recent solo albums, Coming Home To You (Ball, 2019) and As Time Goes By (Boe, 2018).

=== Charitable projects ===
A focus of Patrick's career has been raising funds for UK Armed Services charities. For this purpose he founded CPW Productions in 2009, which raised money via album sales from musical trio The Soldiers, whose 2009 double-platinum album Coming Home and platinum-selling 2010 follow-up Letters Home was produced by Patrick.

In 2020 during the COVID-19 pandemic, Patrick joined forces with Captain Sir Thomas Moore, Michael Ball and the NHS Voices of Care Choir to release "You'll Never Walk Alone" as a charity single, raising funds for NHS Charities Together. Released by Decca Records, on 17 April, the recording topped the United Kingdom's "The Official Big Top 40" chart. It sold almost 36,000 copies in its first 48 hours, and was "biggest trending song" as measured by the Official Charts Company. On 24 April, it went straight to No. 1 in the weekly "Official" UK Singles Chart.
