= Coming Home (The Soldiers album) =

Studio album by The Soldiers
- Released: 26 October 2009
- Recorded: 2009
- Genre: Pop music
- Length: 57:40
- Label: Rhino Records

The Soldiers chronology
Coming Home (2009)	Letters Home (2010)

Coming Home is the debut album by The Soldiers. The album was released on 26 October 2009. All the album's contents are cover versions apart from title track "Coming Home", which celebrated those who have made it back and remembers the fallen. Proceeds will go to the Army Benevolent Fund, Help For Heroes and other groups which support their colleagues. Sgt Maddocks said: "They're feel-good songs that you'd associate with the guys in the army".

The Soldiers recorded their debut album during breaks in their duties.

He said "With a Little Help from my Friends" was particularly pertinent. "You could say that when you're a little bit down there's always someone there to pick you up, brush you down and get on with the day's work. That's just so typical of army life".

Sgt Maj Chilton said there were two or three tracks on the album that any soldier or civilian could relate to. Nick Patrick, who has worked with classical singers Russell Watson and Katherine Jenkins, produced the album.

At 24, L/Cpl Idzi is the youngest and most recognisable member of the band, after making it through to the boot camp stage of ITV talent show, The X Factor in 2007.

== Track listing ==
- CD single
1. "Coming Home" (Jeff Chegwin, Nick Patrick, Jake Hook)– 4:08
2. "He Ain't Heavy" (Bobby Scott, Bob Russell) – 4:34
3. "Tears in Heaven" (Eric Clapton, Will Jennings) – 4:24
4. "I'll Stand by You" (Chrissie Hynde, Tom Kelly, Billy Steinberg) – 4:15
5. "Sailing" (Gavin Sutherland) – 4:02
6. "Lean on Me" (Bill Withers) – 3:31
7. "Against All Odds" ft. Caroline Redman Lusher (Phil Collins) – 3:18
8. "Sacrifice" (Elton John, Bernie Taupin) – 5:07
9. "You've Got a Friend" (Carole King) – 4:26
10. "Bridge Over Troubled Water" (Paul Simon) – 4:12
11. "Stand by Me" (Ben E. King, Jerry Leiber, Mike Stoller) – 3:39
12. "Bring Him Home" (Claude-Michel Schönberg, Herbert Kretzmer) – 3:26
13. "With a Little Help from My Friends" (Lennon-McCartney)– 3:37
14. "A Soldier's Christmas Letter" (Chegwin, Patrick, Hook) – 4:00
15. "The Last Post" (Traditional) – 0:55

== Charts ==
The album entered the UK Albums Chart on 1 November 2009 at Number 4. The following week it fell one place to Number 5. On 15 November 2009, it climbed back to Number 4.

=== Weekly charts ===
Chart (2009)	Peak position
Scottish Albums (OCC)	4
UK Albums (OCC)	4

=== Year-end charts ===
Chart (2009)	Position
UK Albums (OCC)	21

== Certifications ==
Region	Certification	Certified units/sales
United Kingdom (BPI)	2× Platinum	600,000^{^}
^{^} Shipments figures based on certification alone.

== Release history ==
Region	Date	Format	Label
United Kingdom	19 October 2009	Digital Download	Rhino Records
United Kingdom	26 October 2009	CD	Rhino Records
