= Going Home =

Going Home or Goin' Home may refer to:

== Film and television ==
=== Films ===
- Going Home (1944 film), an unreleased entry in the Private Snafu series
- Going Home (1971 film), starring Robert Mitchum
- Going Home (1987 film), starring Nicholas Campbell
- Going Home (Oeroeg), a 1993 Dutch film
- Tom Petty: Going Home, a 1994 TV documentary starring Tom Petty
- Going Home, a 1996 short film featuring Gloria LeRoy
- Going Home, a 2000 film starring Jason Robards and Clint Black
- Going Home, a part of the 2002 Asian horror movie collaboration Three
- Going Home, a 2014 Indian short film directed by Vikas Bahl, starring Alia Bhatt
- Going Home, a 2015 Nigerian film directed by Chika Anadu

=== Television ===
==== Series ====
- Going Home (TV series), a 2000–2001 Australian drama series

==== Episodes ====
- "Going Home", Adam-12 (1990) season 1, episode 18 (1991)
- "Going Home", Anaana's Tent season 1, episode 13 (2018)
- "Going Home", Astronauts series 2, episode 6 (1983)
- "Going Home", Australian Theatre Festival season 2, episode 1 (1980)
- "Going Home", Ben Hall episode 6 (1975)
- "Going Home", Counterstrike (1990) season 2, episode 8 (1991)
- "Going Home", Crime Story (American) season 2, episode 22 (1988)
- "Going Home", Double Trouble (Australian) episode 12 (2008)
- "Going Home", Dr. Kildare season 5, episode 23 (1965)
- "Going Home", ER season 1, episode 3 (1994)
- "Going Home", Family Law (American) season 2, episode 4 (2000)
- "Going Home", Find Me in Paris season 2, episode 26 (2019)
- "Going Home", Fireside Theatre season 3, episode 26 (1951)
- "Going Home", Fushigi Yûgi episode 7 (1995)
- "Going Home", Going Straight episode 1 (1978)
- "Going Home", Heartbeat series 3, episode 4 (1993)
- "Going Home", Hennesey season 3, episode 12 (1961)
- "Going Home", Human Target (1992) episode 6 (1992)
- "Going Home", Invasion (2021) season 1, episode 5 (2021)
- "Going Home", Liberty's Kids episode 39 (2003)
- "Going Home", Little House on the Prairie season 2, episode 22 (1976)
- "Going Home", Lost on Earth episode 13 (1997)
- "Going Home", Love Is Blind season 5, episode 6 (2023)
- "Going Home", Magnum, P.I. (1980) season 6, episode 7 (1985)
- "Going Home", Nurse (American) season 2, episode 5 (1981)
- "Going Home", Once Upon a Time season 3, episode 11 (2013)
- "Going Home", Party of Five season 3, episode 6 (1996)
- "Going Home", Pioneer Quest: A Year in the Real West episode 8 (2001)
- "Going Home", Pirate Islands episode 26 (2003)
- "Going Home", Pointman season 2, episode 6 (1995)
- "Going Home", Screen Two series 3, episode 11 (1987)
- "Going Home", Seven Little Australians episode 10 (1973)
- "Going Home", Short Circuit season 2, episode 2 (2021)
- "Going Home", Snug and Cozi season 2, episode 10 (1997)
- "Going Home", Stone Protectors episode 13 (1993)
- "Going Home", Street Time season 1, episode 20 (2003)
- "Going Home", Stuart Wagstaff's World Playhouse episode 1 (1977)
- "Going Home", Taxi season 3, episode 5 (1980)
- "Going Home", The Bill series 11, episode 19 (1995)
- "Going Home", The National Parks: America's Best Idea episode 4 (2009)
- "Going Home", The Streets of San Francisco season 2, episode 5 (1973)
- "Going Home", The Westerner episode 11 (1960)
- "Going Home", Tracy Beaker Returns series 3, episode 10 (2012)
- "Going Home", Under the Dome season 2, episode 7 (2014)
- "Going Home", Wiseguy season 2, episode 1 (1988)
- "Going Home", Zoo Family episode 6 (1985)

== Literature ==
- Going Home (Steel novel), a 1973 novel by Danielle Steel
- Going Home (Peyton novel), a 1982 children's novel by K. M. Peyton
- Going Home (Lamont novel), a 2025 novel by Tom Lamont
- Going Home (comics), a 1998–2001 Cerebus the Aardvark graphic novel and its first collected volume by Dave Sim
- Going Home (play), a 1976 play by Alma De Groen

== Music ==
=== Artists ===
- Going Home, an American folk music duo with Hope Sandoval

=== Albums ===
- Going Home (Elvin Jones album), 1992
- Going Home (Taj Mahal album), 1980
- Going Home, a 2022 album by Tempest
- Going Home, a 1975 album by Ten Years After
- Going Home, a 1971 album by Georgie Fame
- Going Home, a 2024 extended play by Tyler Joe Miller
- Goin' Home (Archie Shepp and Horace Parlan album), 1977
- Goin' Home (Art Pepper and George Cables album), 1982
- Goin' Home (Bob Stewart album), 1988
- Goin' Home: A Tribute to Fats Domino, 2007
- Goin' Home, a 2004 album by Paul Rishell and Annie Raines
- Goin' Home, a 2014 album by Kenny Wayne Shepherd

=== Songs ===
- "Going Home" (Kenny G composition), 1990
- "Going Home", a 1997 song by ex-Santana members from the album Abraxas Pool
- "Going Home", a 1976 song by Alice Cooper from Alice Cooper Goes to Hell
- "Going Home", a 2008 song by Brian Wilson from That Lucky Old Sun
- "Going Home", a 1990 song by Leo Sayer from Cool Touch
- "Going Home", a 2012 song by Leonard Cohen from Old Ideas
- "Going Home", a 2003 song by Mary Fahl from The Other Side of Time, used as an opening theme of the film Gods and Generals
- "Going Home", a 1992 song by Miles Davis and Michel Legrand from the film soundtrack Dingo
- "Going Home", a 1979 song by Runrig from The Highland Connection
- "Going Home", a 2001 song by Sara Groves from Conversations
- "Going Home", a 2014 song by Sophie Zelmani from Going Home
- "Going Home", a 2018 song by Snoop Dogg from Bible of Love
- "Going Home", a 2024 song by Tyler Joe Miller from an EP of the same name
- "Going Home: Theme of the Local Hero", a 1983 instrumental track by Mark Knopfler from the soundtrack to the film Local Hero
- "Goin' Home" (Dvořák), a 1922 spiritual-like song adapted by William Arms Fisher from Symphony No. 9 (From the New World) by Antonín Dvořák
  - Going Home (Charlie Haden) a 2010 jazzversion of this by Charlie Haden and Hank Jones
- "Goin' Home" (Rolling Stones song), 1966
- "Goin' Home" (The Osmonds song), 1973
- "Goin' Home" (Fats Domino song), a 1955 song by Fats Domino
- "Goin' Home", a 1986 song by Corey Hart from Fields of Fire
- "Goin' Home", a 2009 song by Dan Auerbach from Keep It Hid, featured in the 2009 film Up in the Air
- "Goin' Home", a 1993 song by Dinosaur Jr. from Where You Been
- "Goin' Home", a 1991 song by Helloween from Pink Bubbles Go Ape
- "Goin' Home", a 1977 song by Missouri from Missouri
- "Goin' Home", a 2002 song by Neil Young from Are You Passionate?
- "Goin' Home", a 1998 song by Toto from Toto XX

== Other ==
- Going Home (Twilight: 2000), a 1986 role-playing game adventure

== See also ==
- I'm Going Home (disambiguation)
- Coming Home (disambiguation)
- Homegoing, an African-American funeral tradition
- "Going, Going... Home", a 1995 song by Mike + the Mechanics from Beggar on a Beach of Gold
