= Akemi Sato =

Akemi Sato (also Satō or Satou) may refer to:

- Akemi Satō (singer) (佐藤 朱美, born 1972), Japanese singer
- Akemi Satō (voice actress) (佐藤 朱, born 1980), Japanese voice actress
