= I'm Going Home =

I'm Going Home may refer to:

- I'm Going Home (film), a 2001 French/Portuguese film written and directed by Manoel de Oliveira
- "I'm Going Home", a song from The Rocky Horror Picture Show soundtrack
- "I'm Going Home", a song by Chris de Burgh from Spanish Train and Other Stories
- "I'm Going Home", a song by The Choir
- "I'm Going Home", a song by The Kingston Trio from The Kingston Trio (Nick Bob John)
- "I'm Going Home", a song by Mickey & Sylvia, B-side of the single "Love Is Strange"
- "I'm Going Home", a song by Sacred Harp Singers from the Cold Mountain soundtrack
- "I'm Going Home", a song by Tanita Tikaram from Everybody's Angel
- "I'm Going Home", a song by Ten Years After from Undead
- "I'm Going Home", a song by The Zombies from Zombie Heaven
- "I'm Going Home", a song by Marvin Gaye from You're the man album

== See also ==
- "Home" (Daughtry song)
- Going Home (disambiguation)
