= List of Fushigi Yûgi episodes =

The Region 1 Geneon release of the first season of Fushigi Yûgi was called the Suzaku set.

This is a complete episode listing for the anime series Fushigi Yûgi. Directed by Hajime Kamegaki, the fifty-two-episode series was produced by Studio Pierrot. It is based on the first fourteen volumes of the Fushigi Yûgi manga series written and illustrated by Yuu Watase. The series premiered on TV Tokyo and on the satellite channel Animax on April 6, 1995, and concluded on March 28, 1996. The series was followed by three original video animation (OVA) releases. The first three-episode OVA, released October 25, 1996, was not based on the manga, but was purely an anime creation. The second OVA is based on the final four volumes of the manga series. Spanning six episodes, the series was released as two three-episode volumes, with the first released on May 25, 1997, and the second coming over a year later on August 25, 1998. The final OVA, titled Fushigi Yûgi: Eikoden, is based on two related light novels written by Megumi Nishizaki. Released on December 21, 2001, the series spans four episodes.

The entire Fushigi Yûgi anime series, including the three OVAs, were licensed for Region 1 release by Geneon Entertainment. The series was released under the expanded title Fushigi Yûgi: The Mysterious Play. The TV series was released in eight individual volumes that contained 6–7 episodes each. It was also released in two collectible box sets, with season one contained in the Suzaku set and season two named the Seiryu set. The first two OVAs were released together in a set titled Fushigi Yûgi: The Mysterious Play, while Fushigi Yûgi: Eikoden was released as a single disc volume. The two box sets and the two OVAs were released with similar packaging, to give them a consistent look. All four of these sets were taken out-of-print and no longer available. With the closure of Geneon USA, the individual volumes may now also be out-of-print. On their Facebook page, the company Media Blasters announced that they have rescued the TV series and will release the first season in April 2012.

Fushigi Yûgi uses three pieces of theme music. All fifty-two episodes feature the song "Itōshii Hito no Tame ni" (いとおしい人のために), performed by Akemi Satō, as the opening sequence theme. Yukari Konno's "Tokimeki no Dōkasen" (ときめきの導火線) is used as the series closing theme, except for episode thirty-three which uses "Song of the Wind" (風の旋律, Kaze no Uta), performed by Chika Sakamoto, is used as a memorial sequence for Nuriko. For the final episode, the regular ending theme is used along with the opening theme "Itōshī Hito no Tame ni."

The episodes are summarized, below, using in-universe tone.

== Episodes ==
=== Season 1: 1995 ===
No.	Title	Original release date
1	"The Girl of Legend"; Transliteration: "Densetsu no Shōjo" (Japanese: 伝説の少女)	April 6, 1995
Middle school students Miaka Yuki and Yui Hongo are both preparing for the exams for Jonan Academy, a highly competitive high school. Miaka is an average student, while the brilliant Yui is applying so she and Miaka can go to the same high school. While at the National Library, Miaka follows a vision of a phoenix to a special collections room where she finds a book called the Universe of the Four Gods. When the two girls start reading it, they are pulled into the book and taken to a world similar to ancient China. As they try to get their bearings, they are attacked by two slave traders. A young man with the character for "ogre" on his forehead appears and fights off the traders. He asks the two girls to pay him for saving them, but they have no money so he leaves. While Miaka is searching her pockets, Yui is transported back to the library and begins reading the book again. Miaka looks up to find Yui and the young man gone. Presuming he had taken Yui with him, she hitches a ride on a wagon to the nearest city to search for him. As she searches the city, another man tells her he is friends with the man she is looking for her. He leads her to a secluded area where four of his friends are waiting to rape her and sell her "strange" clothes. Miaka fights them off at first, but they manage to knock her off her feet and pin her to the ground. The young man shows up and easily beats up the four men, saving Miaka again.
2	"Priestess of Suzaku"; Transliteration: "Suzaku no Miko" (Japanese: 朱雀の巫女)	April 13, 1995
When the young man is unable to tell Miaka where Yui is, Miaka doggedly follows him demanding he help her search. After she loudly accused him of selling Yui and being a slave trader, the embarrassed man stops to talk. Seeing the imperial procession nearby, the young man remarks that one jewel from the emperor's crown would make him rich, so Miaka runs up to the palanquin and asks if she can have a jewel. She trips and grabs one the cloth decorations to catch herself, ripping it. The guards attack her for dishonoring the emperor, but the young man rescues her using a smoke bomb. The man introduces himself as Tamahome. When she reminds him she has no money, he kisses her forehead as payment, just as the emperor's guards discover them. Suddenly, Miaka begins emitting a red light and starts to vanish. Slipping between worlds, she is relieved to see Yui is safe and reading the book in the library before the light fades and she returns to the world in the book. On the emperor's orders, she and Tamahome are captured and imprisoned. When Miaka chews some gum and blows a bubble, it terrifies the guard who runs away, leaving the keys behind. After they escape the cell, Tamahome tells Miaka about the four gods of the universe. He explains that the Konan empire is ruled by the phoenix Suzaku. He turns to find Miaka gone. (Miaka smells food and wanders off to eat.) While searching for Tamahome, she meets a beautiful person named Hotohori who seems excited to learn Miaka is from another world. As they talk, Tamahome is captured by guards nearby. The "woman" hides Miaka, but Miaka reveals herself to help Tamahome. When the guards roughly grab Miaka, Tamahome quickly breaks free from the guards holding to fight the ones hurting her. Seeing the symbol that appears on Tamahome's forehead as he fights, Hotohori stops the guards and reveals that he is really the emperor and a man. In the throne room, Hotohori asks Miaka to become the Priestess of Suzaku to save his country of Konan. In doing so, she will obtain the power to fulfill her wishes. After thinking of all the wishes she could make, including passing the exams and going to high school with Yui (and having a sexy body and having all the boys drool over her), Miaka accepts and all in the palace bow before the Priestess of Suzaku.
3	"The Seven Stars of Suzaku"; Transliteration: "Suzaku no Shichisei" (Japanese: 朱雀の七星)	April 20, 1995
Miaka dreams about her big brother, but she wakes up and finds Tamahome instead. He's checking on her because Hotohori is worried that she's sad. He offers to be her honorary big brother, and tells her that with the power of Suzaku, she can go home. This galvanizes Miaka into action. Hotohori explains that there are seven constellations in the south that belong to Suzaku, and the names of the constellations appear on the bodies of seven people. When all seven are gathered together, the priestess will gain the power of Suzaku. The finest warriors in the kingdom are gathered and Miaka tries to provoke them, thinking that the Suzaku Seven would not try to harm her, but they all chase her and make a building fall down around her. Back in the real world, Yui notices blood on her leg. Tamahome has shielded Miaka from most of the rubble, but her leg was injured. Tamahome struggles to keep the building from falling on them both, almost killing himself to save Miaka, but luckily one of the royal consorts quickly digs them out, displaying superhuman strength. She is one of the Suzaku Seven, Nuriko. She says she really wanted to save Tamahome and gives him a kiss. Miaka washes her clothes and thinks about how to make friends with Nuriko, as she needs her to get home. Tamahome barges in, hoping to hide from Nuriko. Miaka decides to serve as Nuriko's maid, but Nuriko makes her tasks difficult, and flirts with Tamahome in front of Miaka. Later that day, Tamahome escapes from Nuriko and talks to Miaka, who is depressed about Nuriko and Tamahome's possible relationship. He tends to her leg.
4	"Missing Love"; Transliteration: "Surechigau Omoi" (Japanese: すれちがう想い)	April 27, 1995
As Tamahome tends to her leg, Miaka asks him if he loves Nuriko. He laughs and calls her jealous, and says he wants money more than love. Nuriko overhears them. Later, she asks Miaka to search for a lost earring by the lake in the dark. Hotohori is being criticised by his advisors about not taking an Empress near the lake. Miaka and Hotohori meet, he offers to order Nuriko to behave, and Miaka says no, she'd rather become Nuriko's friend. Miaka falls in the lake, and gets caught in the weeds. Nuriko gloats that she sent Miaka on a false errand. Tamahome overhears and Nuriko reveals she's in love with Hotohori. Miaka comes back from the pond. They slap each other, make friends and Miaka promises to put in a word for Nuriko with Hotohori. Hotohori tells Miaka that he's only ever loved the priestess of Suzaku, but he senses Tamahome and Nuriko listening in. He proposes to Miaka. The next morning both Tamahome and Nuriko are cold to Miaka, and she follows them to the market. Tamahome tries to sell some of Miaka's bubblegum, but the crowd doesn't like it, so Miaka reveals herself. The crowd goes wild and they have to escape quickly. Later, a gang set upon them and Tamahome and the gang leader haggle over a price for Miaka. Miaka and Tamahome fight the gang and win, but Miaka is furious at Tamahome for rescuing her, as the gang leader said it would be impossible for Tamahome to work in the town without his say-so. Miaka tells Tamahome she loves him, but is rebuffed. She falls down in a fever.
5	"Bewildered Heartbeat"; Transliteration: "Tomadō Kodō" (Japanese: とまどう鼓動)	May 4, 1995
Hotohori questions Tamahome about Miaka's illness. Tamahome is evasive. Miaka is seriously ill, so Hotohori resolves to send her home, using Taiitsukun, the ultimate ruler of the universe. Hotohori tells Miaka of this, asking her to come back once she's well again. Outside, Nuriko accuses Tamahome of being jealous of Hotohori, telling him to apologize to Miaka so that Hotohori will be free for Nuriko. They set off to go to Taiitsukun, with a tense feeling between Miaka and Tamahome. That night, Nuriko tells Miaka to bathe in the mineral spring near where they are camped. She tells Tamahome to go to the spring, saying Miaka asked him to meet her out there. Miaka undresses to bathe and she is frightened by a dark shape. Tamahome comes running, and "saves" her from the dark shape, a log. After realizing Miaka wasn't clothed, they both turned their backs on one another, and they both apologise. Tamahome is very embarrassed by Miaka's appearance. Tamahome leaves and Nuriko reveals herself. Miaka hugs Nuriko and Nuriko's top falls off enough to reveal that "she" is a man. The next day, Hotohori and Miaka have a heart-to-heart discussion, which makes Tamahome and Nuriko jealous. Taiitsukun decides she will have to test the group. She sends a thick fog. Tamahome insults Miaka and she runs off. She sees a dinner table and runs towards it, and is trapped in a mirror, where she is confronted by an evil mirror-Miaka.
6	"Even If I Die..."; Transliteration: "Inochi Hatetemo" (Japanese: 命果てても)	May 11, 1995
The mirror-Miaka insults her and tells Miaka she'd be taking over Miaka's life from now on. The imposter grinned evilly, saying Hotohori was "a much better catch" than Tamahome, and steps out of the mirror, trapping Miaka there, and walks back to camp, carrying the mirror. She reveals the secret of Nuriko's gender, and tries to kiss Hotohori, but Hotohori realises that something is wrong. They try to fight mirror-Miaka, but she uses the mirror to suck out all their power. Taiitsukun goads Miaka to think of something to defeat the mirror-Miaka. Miaka breaks a plate from the dinner table and stabs herself deeply in the heart to wound the mirror-Miaka, who is a part of Miaka. The mirror-Miaka is defeated by the three warriors, and Miaka reappears, nearly dead. Nuriko treats her wound. In the real world, Yui is also wounded. Yui and Miaka talk while Miaka is between death and life. Miaka sees a paradise, but returns to the world of the four gods. Taiitsukun reveals herself to the group, and tells them she can get Miaka home.
7	"Going Home"; Transliteration: "Kaeritai..." (Japanese: 帰りたい...)	May 18, 1995
Taiitsukun takes the group to her palace atop Mount Taikyoku where her assistants, the Nyan-Nyans, heal Miaka, Tamahome, and Hotohori's wounds. As they heal Miaka's wounds, Taiitsukun says Miaka doesn't have enough power to go home because of the blood loss, so Tamahome and Hotohori offer to give her some of their blood, though it means their powers will be cut in half. Once the transfusion is done, Taiitsukun notes that with only three Suzaku warriors, the processing of sending Miaka home will be difficult, but they are all determined to help her. Miaka has trouble concentrating out of concern for the others, but then she hears Yui calling out to her. Remembering her friendship with Yui and their years together, Miaka is enveloped in the red light of Suzaku. As she is transported home, a comet-like ray of blue light passes her going back towards the book world. Miaka wakes up on the floor of the library with the open book nearby, but Yui is not there. As the library is closing, Miaka returns the Universe of the Four Gods to its shelf and leaves. She runs into two of their school friends. Thrilled to be reunited after so long, she learns that for them, it had only been two hours since she and Yui had left them to go to the library. Wondering if Yui returned home, Miaka calls her house.
8	"Brief Parting"; Transliteration: "Aitai..." (Japanese: 逢いたい...)	May 25, 1995
Learning that Yui is still not home, Miaka goes to her own home where she tells her big brother, Keisuke about the events in the Universe of the Four Gods. Though he says he doesn't believe her, he also warns her to stay away from the book. However, Miaka had already promised her Warriors that she would return she also realizes that Yui may have been taken into the book in exchange for her. After packing some of her things and some snacks, she returns to the library. Keisuke sees her and tries to stop her, but Miaka tells him good-bye and is absorbed into the book. In the other world, Hotohori welcomes her back and tells her that it has been three months since she left and that their country is now caught up in a war. He asks her to hurry to summon Suzaku. She looks for Tamahome to ask him to help find the rest of the Celestial Warriors, but he has left the palace. Miaka, joined by Nuriko, go to find him. Miaka wonders how Tamahome could have left, but Nuriko explains her that Tamahome really missed Miaka while she was gone and that he does love her. Suddenly, the surroundings become pitch-dark. Nuriko and Miaka are thrown from their horse, and a man with a pickax towers over Miaka. When the man speaks, Miaka realizes it's Tamahome. They are glad to be reunited, and Tamahome introduces Miaka to his companions. However, the torches suddenly go out and a pair of hands pull Miaka into the forest.
9	"Enemies Unseen"; Transliteration: "Miezaru Teki" (Japanese: 見えざる敵)	June 1, 1995
A fox-like monk reveals himself to Miaka, warning her that people from the rival kingdom of Kutou are after her. He disappears, leaving only his hat, as Tamahome arrives. They hear a scream and run back to find all of the men that had been with Tamahome dead, and an unharmed Nuriko pinned to a tree by arrows. Nuriko recalls that as soon as Miaka had been taken and Tamahome had run after her, a volley of arrows had appeared, killing all but him. The three go to the local village Tamahome was hired to protect. In the morning, Miaka spots Tamahome leaving town and quickly wakes Nuriko so they can follow him. They soon arrive in Tamahome's home village. Tamahome's father is very ill and his four younger siblings tend the farm while Tamahome works. As he goes to leave, one of his younger sisters faints with fever and Miaka reveals herself to shout out instructions on how to treat the girl. She goes to the river to get some water, but is attacked by a group of assassins. Tamahome, sensing Miaka is in danger, runs to find her, but the fox-monk saves her by using a strike of energy from within the hat he left behind. He introduces himself as Chichiri and warns Miaka that unless she starts acting more responsibly, people around her are going to suffer. When they return to Tamahome's home, they find his family and Nurkio have been tied up in wires by another assassin. Tamahome is also captured and the assassin demands Miaka let him kill her to save the others. She consents, but Chichiri saves her and frees the others. During the battle, his Suzaku symbol is revealed. Nuriko pins the assassin and begins questioning him but he is killed by a flurry of arrows before he can saw more than that his kingdom is seeking their "Priestess of Seiryū." Miaka, worried that Yui is the one they are searching for and not wanting to put anyone in more danger, sneaks out of the house and runs off to Kutou.
10	"Looking For Yui"; Transliteration: "Toraware no Shōjo" (Japanese: 囚われの少女)	June 8, 1995
Miaka takes a shortcut to Kutou through a forest, but is attacked by a tiger. She tries to defend herself, but Tamahome arrives to save her. She tells him to leave her be, not wanting to cause him any more trouble, but he insists that he must be by her side and protect her. because he was in love with her. Accepting his words, Miaka falls and tells him she is too hungry to move and asks him to bring her a bag of food from her horse. However, as soon as he leaves, she runs off again, catching a wagon to the next village. Tamahome follows on her horse after sending Nuriko to report back to Hotohori. Hotohori, unable to abandon his responsibilities as emperor, wants to send soldiers to find her but his advisors remind him that doing so would be an act of aggression against Kutou and make the war worse. Miaka arrives at the gate to Kutou, but does not have a passport. Chichiri, who was following her the whole time, uses his power to freeze the guards so she can get into the city. A general appears and breaks the spell, then asks who she is. Miaka claims to be the Priestess of Seiryū, so he tells her he will take her to the emperor immediately. Miaka initially declines, saying she has something to do first, but then sees Tamahome trying to get past the guards and agrees to go immediately. Chichiri stops Tamahome, explaining the situation to him as Miaka is taken away. The general, Nakago takes her to the emperor, and then Yui is also brought in. The two friends tearfully embrace, but in doing so Miaka drops her bag and the scarlet Suzaku copy of the Universe of the Four God falls out. Nakago picks it up and opens it, revealing Miaka's true identity as the Priestess of Suzaku.
11	"Priestess of Seiryuu"; Transliteration: "Seiryū no Miko" (Japanese: 青龍の巫女)	June 15, 1995
Nakago tells the emperor that Miaka must be the Priestess of Suzaku and the emperor orders her arrest. The guards are distracted by news of intruders, and Miaka and Yui are able to escape. The two girls hide inside an old storage room. Nakago orders his men to find them and to be careful not to harm Yui. Inside the room, as Miaka and Yui talk, Miaka notices a scar on Yui's wrist and asks what happened, but Yui says it was just an accident from when she arrived. Outside, Tamahome is fighting the Kutou soldiers when Nakago arrives to face him. When Tamahome tries to attack, Nakago easily knocks him aside. Chichiri tries to help by using his freezing spell, which enables Tamahome to get away, but Nakago quickly breaks the spell. Back inside, Miaka realizes that Nakago still has the Universe of the Four Gods. When she and Yui are discovered by one of the soldiers, Tamahome rescues them, then Yui leaves them in the room to go get the scroll for Miaka. Yui tells Nakago that she is going with Miaka, and Nakago gives her the scroll but also asks if Miaka really cares as much about her as she thinks. Grabbing the scarred wrist, he tells her to remember what happened to her. Returning to Tamahome and Miaka, Yui is glad she can go back to Konan with her best friend, and happy she can get to know Tamahome better. In the room, Tamahome asks why Miaka left him behind, but Miaka tells him that this was between her and Yui. Tamahome refuses to leave her alone and he kisses her and declares that he loves her. Miaka tells him she loves him and only pushed him away because she didn't want him hurt anymore. She also tells him she came back for him as they kiss again. Yui, who overheard, comes in feigning cheerfulness and saying they can leave now. Before the leave, she asks Miaka to go with her somewhere, leading her into the Shrine of Seiryu. Once they go in, Tamahome and Chichiri are unable to follow, barred by a magical barrier preventing Suzaku warriors from entering. Inside, Yui reveals that she now hates Miaka for abandoning her in the book world and coming back only for Tamahome. She promises to take Tamahome from her before allowing Nakago to begin attacking Miaka. Chichiri teleports himself through the barrier just in time to save her from being crushed against the door. Tamahome breaks through the barrier with the power of his love for Miaka. He tries to get Yui to come with them as Chichiri uses his hat to transport them to safety, but she refuses and they leave.
12	"Only You"; Transliteration: "Anata Shika Inai" (Japanese: あなたしかいない)	June 22, 1995
Miaka dreams of when she met Yui and their lifelong friendship. When she wakes up, she finds herself and Tamahome both unclothed in a room at Taiitsukun's palace with their wounds now healed. Chichiri, Taiitsukun and the Nyan-nyans enter and Miaka says she must go back to ask what happened with Yui. Taiitsukun says there is an easier way, and leads them to a gigantic mirror which records everything that happens in the world and replays it. Taiitsukun has the mirror showed them the events of three months earlier, and Miaka can only watch in horror as Yui is chased through a slum in Kutou by three men who catch her, pin her down, and begin ripping off her clothes. Unable to watch anymore, Miaka screams at it to stop and shuts herself inside her room, feeling it is her fault Yui was raped. Taiitsukun enters and shows her the true importance of the Priestess of Suzaku which makes Miaka more determined to summon Suzaku. She decides that she should relinquish her love for Tamahome because Yui loves him too. After they return to Konan, Tamahome wonders at Miaka's strange behavior and goes to her room to confront her. Hotohori catches him there and pulls his sword, demanding Tamahome explain his transgression. Refusing to back down, Tamahome openly declares his love for Miaka. Hotohori accepts Tamahome's willingness to face down his emperor for his feelings, and leaves them alone despite his own unrequited feelings.
13	"For the Sake of Love"; Transliteration: "Aisuru ga Yue" (Japanese: 愛するがゆえ)	June 29, 1995
Tamahome and Hotohori sense an evil presence in Miaka's room and burst in, ready to attack. A disembodied voice speaks out to them, stating that Kutou will destroy and conquer Konan unless Tamahome agrees to go to Kutou. Nuriko and Chichiri, who had also felt this evil presence, enter the room. With Chichiri's help, the evil presence is revealed to be a Kutou spy. Despite the four Warriors' attempts to stop him, he escapes. Chichiri confirms that no evil was now present, however Miaka remains worried by the message given to them and that Tamahome might leave. At the back of her mind, she wonders about the possible reason for this, briefly suspecting Yui. Hotohori urges Tamahome to ignore the message, despite the fact that Kutou's army is three times bigger than Konan's and is advancing towards Tamahome's home village, and suggests that they all go to sleep. Tamahome chooses to watch over Miaka, promising he will never leave her side. When Miaka falls asleep, Tamahome decides to go to Kutou, kissing Miaka and wishing her well. The next morning, Miaka is frantic after she finds Tamahome missing. She hands Hotohori a letter that Tamahome had left behind for her, saying what he had done and that he will come back as soon as the last Warriors have been found. Although in despair, Miaka decides to look for the other three Warriors of Suzaku without Tamahome. She is equipped with a hand mirror that will give her a sign of any Warrior's presence. Near Mt. Reikaku, the mirror flashes, but just then, Chichiri goes missing, offering to take Hotohori's place in Konan as the latter ventures with Miaka. Nuriko and Miaka stop for lunch and discover that it was a trap set by mountain bandits. They are suddenly saved by Hotohori, and then continue their journey. Hotohori hands Tamahome's letter to Miaka, and points out the words "Wo Ai Ni" – I love you. Miaka is crestfallen once more, and Hotohori tries to comfort her, but Miaka pushes away his advances. As she runs away, spikes come down toward her, and Hotohori pushes her down. Nuriko too is rendered unconscious. When they wake up, they discover themselves in Mt. Reikaku. Miaka tears off some of the bandits' clothes, trying to find a Suzaku symbol. She is taken to the bandits' leader. In Kutou, as Tamahome is held captive, he is confronted by Nakago. Yui attends to him when he is slapped by Nakago, and even as Tamahome says that he will reunite her with Miaka soon, Yui resolves to keep him and Miaka apart.
14	"Wolf in the Fortress"; Transliteration: "Toride no Ōkami" (Japanese: 砦の狼)	July 6, 1995
Miaka is kidnapped by a group of bandits and is nearly raped by the bandit leader, Eiken. Hotohori and Nuriko rescue her and force the bandit to tell them of the Suzaku Warrior among the bandits, and he is tortured until he tells them that it is Tasuki. However, just before Eiken can tell them who Tasuki was, Miaka is carried off by a young man whom Eiken calls Genrō and who escapes using talismans that summoned phantom wolves. Genrō brings Miaka to a secret place, where they are soon joined by Kōji, Genrō's fellow bandit and best friend. Miaka learns that Genrō was meant to be the bandit leader, and promises to help them, if in return they will help her find Tasuki. They fight with the rest of the bandits, and soon Tamahome mysteriously appears to help them. Genrō finally becomes what he was meant to be – the bandits' leader – and attains the tessen, a magical fan that emitted fire through a spell. Miaka approaches Tamahome, but Tamahome vanishes, and Miaka is distraught to learn that he was only a phantom, summoned by one of Genrō's talismans on which Miaka herself had written Tamahome's name.
15	"The City of Resurrection"; Transliteration: "Yomigaeri no Miyako" (Japanese: 蘇りの都)	July 13, 1995
Miaka, Hotohori and Nuriko ask for Tasuki before they leave. Eiken denies that he knows who Tasuki was, and Genrō says that Tasuki is dead. When they visit Tasuki's grave the next morning, one bandit tells them of rumors saying that in the city Choko, there lives a person who can resurrect the dead. In Kutou, Yui is also informed of this. Miaka, Hotohori and Nuriko leave for Choko, and soon, they meet a woman named Shōka. Shōka has the power to resurrect the dead, and tells the three of a disease that causes high fever and excruciating pain that is believed to be worse than death itself. When they ask Shōka to come with them, she refuses to do so, saying that her powers only exist within Choko. The trio leave to bring Tasuki's body to her and Miaka becomes weakened with a fever. Suddenly, corpses rise from the ground and attack them, and they are saved when Genrō suddenly appears, revealing himself to be Tasuki. Miaka becomes weaker, and they realize that Miaka has caught the illness. In Kutou, meanwhile, Nakago brings the news of Miaka's illness to Yui and Tamahome. Yui is deeply troubled, then suppresses her shock and worry for Miaka, remembering that her troubles had been Miaka's fault. That same morning, Shōka, Miaka, and her three Warriors are led to a man called Juan Myō. Miaka steadily grows weaker, and so does Shōka. Miaka and the Warriors follow a young man to his house after Miaka had fought with him for food. They notice many jars of medicine so they ask for his help but he turns them away. Miaka collapses and she is brought to Shōka's house. Shōka tells them that resurrecting the dead is her only power, so if Miaka is to be healed, first she must die. Upon learning this, Hotohori prepares to kill Miaka.
16	"Battle of Sorrow"; Transliteration: "Kanashiki Tatakai" (Japanese: 哀しき戦い)	July 20, 1995
Tamahome tries to escape, and is caught and tortured by Nakago. Hotohori cannot bring himself to kill Miaka, and instead goes to talk to Juan Myō again. Whilst there, they mention Shōka, and Juan tells them that she died a year ago. Shōka tries to kill Miaka, but Miaka talks her out of it, saying she has faith in Hotohori. Hotohori, Nuriko and Genrō hurry back to Miaka, but are attacked by the possessed villagers. Shōka yells at Miaka telling her to get away from her, but Miaka can't hear her. Hotohori, Nuriko and Genrō arrive, with a mysterious fighter, who is Juan Myō. Shōka accuses Juan of leaving her to die, and Miaka deduces that they were lovers. Miaka comforts the young woman, despite her monstrous appearance, and tells her she knows how she feels. The woman returned to normal, and in the weakness of her desperation, Shōka sprouts a sickness demon from her back that had possessed her when she died, which tries to eat Miaka. Shōka begs Juan to kill her with his powers. He does so, and the house vanishes and the villagers fall down in a faint, unpossessed once more. Juan heals Miaka and he is revealed as Mitsukake, the sixth of the Suzaku Seven, with the powers of a Healer. He tells them that he used his Suzaku powers to become the village doctor, and he was called very far away when Shōka was dying. He returned too late to save her. Miaka tells him that Shōka looks happy now, and gives a Suzaku vow on the rising sun to never give up, for Shōka's sake.
17	"Magic Flute"; Transliteration: "Meguriai no Ne" (Japanese: めぐり逢いの音[ね])	July 27, 1995
Five days had passed since Miaka had found Mitsukake, and since then, she and her Warriors have been searching for the final Suzaku Warrior. A song is played mysteriously upon a flute—even more mysterious is that it was something only Miaka could hear. When Miaka and company venture out, they arrive at Hakkō village, Tamahome's home village. Mitsukake heals Tamahome's father, and all six of them are invited to stay in Tamahome's home. Before Miaka sleeps, she is notices bats outside the window, and a Kutou spy is watching her. In Kutou, meanwhile, Yui had been attending to Tamahome, who had been asleep for the last five days. Yui reveals to Tamahome her feelings and tells him to forget about Miaka, but Yui advances no further upon Tamahome's bewildered remark. Back in Hakkō, Miaka is awakened by the same song she had heard that morning, leading her to go outside when it stops. She is attacked by bats, and even as Hotohori and Tasuki come to her aid, they continue to be devoured by the bats. The flute is played again, killing all of the bats and the Kutou spy and saving them. The flute player was revealed to be Chiriko, the final Suzaku Warrior. They return to Konan the next day, where they are welcomed by Chichiri and Tasuki, Mitsukake and Chiriko learn for the first time that Hotohori is the emperor. With both Tamahome and the Universe of the Four Gods still in Kutou, they have yet another thing to accomplish, to which Chichiri provides a solution: a spell that would connect from Konan to Kutou, allowing Miaka to speak to the imprisoned Tamahome. Miaka is overjoyed upon seeing Tamahome again.
18	"Love Trap"; Transliteration: "Renbo no Wana" (Japanese: 恋慕の罠)	August 3, 1995
Miaka and Tamahome talk to each other with the help of Chichiri's powers, arranging to meet the next day in Kutou. Yui overhears their conversation, and is heartbroken upon learning of Tamahome's planned departure and his rejection of her. Yui runs into a surprised Nakago, who gives her a small parcel. He tells her that it is a way of keeping Tamahome there in Kutou with her, and Yui accepts it. In Konan, meanwhile, before Miaka sleeps, she makes a wish upon the stars to really be reunited with Tamahome. When Miaka wakes up the next morning, Nuriko gives her a special doll, which, when a couple's names are written on the doll which is in turn buried in the ground, supposedly makes a couple's love eternal. After having written hers and Tamahome's names on it, Miaka is unnerved to see it break before her very eyes, thinking of it as a bad sign. In Kutou, Yui takes the pill inside the parcel Nakago had given her and tries to put it into Tamahome's food while he sleeps—something she fails to do. When Tamahome wakes up and looks for Yui, he overhears Nakago and Yui's conversation and learns the truth. Miaka leaves to meet Tamahome, along with Chichiri, Tasuki, and, unbeknown to them, Mitsukake's cat Tama. Soon, they find the meeting place Miaka and Tamahome had agreed upon, a gigantic tree. However, when Tamahome tries to talk to Yui, Yui feeds him the dark pill through her mouth, rendering him unconscious. Miaka, Chichiri and Tasuki are caught unawares when, instead of whom they had been waiting for, they are met by Yui, Nakago and a regiment of soldiers.
19	"Shattered Love"; Transliteration: "Hikisakareru Ai" (Japanese: ひきさかれる愛)	August 10, 1995
Miaka is captured by the soldiers as Tasuki and Chichiri escape, hiding somewhere in the palace grounds with a slightly uneasy feeling. When she asks Yui where Tamahome is, although despite not knowing it herself, Yui talks to Miaka coldly. Wondering what could have happened, Yui asks Nakago about the strange pill, but all that Nakago says is that Tamahome is being treated with "the greatest of care". Miaka is thrown into the dungeons by the soldiers, and she escapes with Tama's help, who had unknowingly come with her there. Yui learns of Miaka's escape, and prepares food to lure Miaka to her. Although Miaka then apologizes to Yui and says that she will not leave her as they are best friends, Yui openly declares that she will never forgive Miaka. As they argue, Tamahome enters the room. When Miaka embraces him, he shockingly pushes her off him and hits her with his nun-chucks. Strangely, he acts coldly towards Miaka, but softens up when he talks to Yui. After a failed attempt to hit Miaka's head with his nun-chucks, Tamahome calls for the soldiers to lead her away. However, in his last attack upon Miaka, he had undone one of her hair buns, and one ribbon was left behind. For a moment, he is seemingly crestfallen, then keeps the ribbon with him as he is sent for by Nakago and ordered to kill Miaka, Tasuki and Chichiri. Miaka refuses to let the soldiers lead her away, and Nakago suddenly appears, leading her to a post where Chichiri and Tasuki are tied up. After threatening to "kill" Miaka, Nakago is revealed to be Chichiri in disguise, and that the Chichiri tied up with Tasuki was merely an illusion. Miaka does not tell them about what had happened, and Chichiri leaves, disguised as Nakago, to look for Tamahome. Miaka outwits Tasuki, tying him up against the post again despite his protests, and returns to the tree to wait for Tamahome again.
20	"Unreachable Hope"; Transliteration: "Todokanu Negai" (Japanese: とどかぬ願い)	August 17, 1995
Chichiri, disguised as Nakago, is discovered by the real Nakago. Chichiri frantically goes to Tasuki, and the two go to look for Miaka. Meanwhile, Miaka meets Tamahome under the tree. Tamahome acts kindly towards her again, but his real intention is still to kill his fellow Suzaku Warriors and Miaka. When Miaka shows Tamahome the letter he had written to her before his departure from Konan, he rips it to shreds, devastating her. Tasuki and Chichiri appear to save Miaka, and a fight ensues between Tamahome and Tasuki. Nakago and Yui watch the scene from above, and Nakago reveals to Yui that the pill they had fed Tamahome is actually a drug formulated to alter the consumer's memories and personality. When Chichiri hides himself and Miaka, Nakago enters the battle. Chichiri successfully uses Tama as a medium to break the barrier of Seiryū with the help of Hotohori, Nuriko, Mitsukake, and ultimately, Chiriko and his flute. Miaka, Chichiri, Tasuki and Tama are finally able to leave the Kutou palace, and a crying Miaka bids farewell to Tamahome. However, when they are gone, Tamahome's blank eyes are filled too with tears.
21	"To Protect You"; Transliteration: "Kimi o Mamoru Tame ni" (Japanese: 君を護るために)	August 24, 1995
Hotohori learns of what Tamahome has done under the influence of Kodoku. Miaka is depressed at the thought that Tamahome might never return to Konan, and still feels the pain that the encounter has left behind, for Mitsukake could only heal her physical wounds. Tamahome is perpetually disturbed by images of Miaka in his mind and by the ribbon she had left behind, and resolves to kill her. Chiriko tries to comfort Miaka with his music, and Hotohori, Nuriko and Chichiri visit her as well, but Miaka prefers to be left alone. Later on, Miaka ventures around the palace, and comes upon Tamahome's empty room. When Nuriko visits Miaka's room, all he finds is a note saying "Sayonara". Miaka comes to a raging river and tries to drown herself, having lost the will to live. Hotohori, however, saves her. When the unconscious Miaka regains consciousness, Hotohori opens up to her about his feelings and kisses her. Miaka is at first reluctant to accept him, but after she gets some rest, she finally agrees. Suddenly, they are disturbed by news of Tamahome's arrival. Hotohori takes Miaka to an unused room and locks her there, and goes to the courtyard where Tamahome is waiting to do battle with him.
22	"I'll Never Leave You"; Transliteration: "Nido to Hanarenai" (Japanese: 二度と離れない)	August 31, 1995
Tamahome begins battle with Hotohori with the intention of killing him as well as Miaka, who tries to escape from the room where she is kept in. The battle progresses with Hotohori gaining advantage over Tamahome, but all of a sudden, Hotohori is distracted when he sees Miaka, who has managed to escape from her imprisonment, running towards them. Miaka screams, and in this instance Tamahome is distracted, and Hotohori runs his sword right through Tamahome's torso. Miaka chillingly screams out Tamahome's name, running towards him. Even as Tamahome tries to kill her in his weakened state, Miaka kisses him, and Tamahome finally breaks free of the curse Nakago had set. Mitsukake heals him, after which he returns to Kutou to retrieve the "Universe of the Four Gods" scroll. Yui allows him to leave, and although Miaka is completely glad upon Tamahome's return, all is not as it seems. Nakago has set one more trap for them.
23	"Shadow of Intrigue"; Transliteration: "Bōryaku no Yochō" (Japanese: 謀略の予兆)	September 7, 1995
A strange figure is shown reading the stars revealing that a disaster is heading for the Suzaku Seven. The entire palace and Suzaku Seven prepare for the ceremony to summon Suzaku. Nakago introduces one of the Seiryū Seven to Yui and explains that there is a spy among the Suzaku Seven. Tamahome returns the hair ribbon to Miaka which he had kept even under Nakago's control. Miaka stands in front of the fire surrounded by the Suzaku Seven.
24	"Resolution"; Transliteration: "Honō no Ketsui" (Japanese: 炎の決意)	September 14, 1995
The ceremony to summon Suzaku commences as Miaka makes her 3 wishes. When nothing appears, Chiriko starts playing the flute and everyone falls on their knees in pain. Chiriko reveals himself to be Amiboshi, a member of the Seiryū Seven. Suddenly, another sound breaks Amiboshi's powers. As Amiboshi runs away, Tasuki and Tamahome pursue him then Chichiri and Miaka follow. The group follows Amiboshi to a river. As Amiboshi steps on a weak stone which crumbles he starts to fall into the river. Miaka jumps and grabs his flute in time to save him, but Amiboshi has different plans and lets go of the flute and falls into the river. The group return to the castle and come back with only Amiboshi's flute. Then the real Chiriko is revealed to be a thirteen-year-old boy. He tells them how he saved them. With all the celestial warriors they try to summon Suzuku once more but they fail to do so. Taiitsukun appears and tells them of another way to summon Suzaku.
25	"Love and Sorrow"; Transliteration: "Aisarete, Kanashikute...." (Japanese: 愛されて、悲しくて‥‥)	September 21, 1995
After Taiitsukun tells Miaka to discontinue her love for Tamahome that would otherwise compromise her quest to summon Suzaku, Miaka is heartbroken. When Tamahome proposes to Miaka, she tells him she doesn't love him anymore to fulfill Taiitsukun's instructions to break off their relationship. Miaka seeks advice from Chichiri and finds out where his scar came from. This episode ends with Miaka heading to the Star Festival.

=== Season 2: 1995–1996 ===
No.	Title	Original release date
26	"Star Festival"; Transliteration: "Hoshimi Matsuri no Yoru" (Japanese: 星見祭りの夜)	September 28, 1995
Nuriko, Tasuki, and Miaka have a fun time at the Star Festival. Miaka is reminded of Amiboshi's death and runs away from the festival to honor his death at the river. Tamahome finds her there and tells her they need to talk. Miaka tells Tamahome that Taiitsukun said that she must abandon her love for Tamahome. Tamahome is upset but runs away saying that after they've successfully called Suzaku he will make Miaka a happy bride. The episode ends with Tamahome walking into his home and finding his family dead.
27	"Tombstone Oath"; Transliteration: "Chikai no Bohyō" (Japanese: 誓いの墓標)	October 5, 1995
Tamahome is able to talk to Yuiren before she dies. She tells him that she has been a good girl and asks Tamahome to never leave her side. Suboshi, Amiboshi's brother, appears and admits that he killed Tamahome's family. Tamahome becomes enraged and starts attacking Suboshi. During the battle, Tamahome's ponytail gets cut off by Suboshi's weapon. Suboshi is no match for Tamahome's power — amplified by Taiitsukun's gift and rage at his family's death. Suboshi is saved by Soi, another member of the Seiryū Seven. Tamahome continues in his blind rage as Nuriko pleads for him to stop because his body cannot handle that much power and because he is scaring Miaka. Tamahome calms down and enters his home. He sees that Chuei tried to protect his family with a kitchen knife. Tamahome buries his family along with the gifts he got them. Miaka is uncertain what to say to Tamahome and he asks to be alone. Nuriko worries that Tamahome will not be emotionally fit to accompany them to Hokkan. Tamahome wakes up Nuriko and Miaka and surprises them by telling them with a cheerful attitude that they should be returning to the city. He gives Miaka the gift Yuiren made for her, a gift for brides-to-be. Nuriko, Tamahome, and Miaka return to the ship. Hotohori entrusts his sword to Miaka during her travel to Hokkan because he cannot accompany her. Both Miaka and Tamahome have renewed resolve to protect the ones they love and get the Shinzaho before Seiryū.
28	"The Ancient Path"; Transliteration: "Inishie no Michi" (Japanese: 古昔之途[いにしえのみち])	October 12, 1995
A Fushigi Yûgi digest episode. In this episode, additional information is given about characters and the plot.
29	"Mysteries Afoot"; Transliteration: "Ugokidashita Nazo" (Japanese: 動き出した謎)	October 19, 1995
Miaka's brother realizes they are connected by a hair that she left in the book. Her brother runs into an acquaintance while trying to leave the library with the book. He tells the guy about what has happened to Miaka so far between Yui, Tamahome, and her. Also the Suzaku seven. His friend tries to help him learn more about the story. They find some very suspicious things out about the person who returned the book to Japan. They then find out that the people who wrote the book intended for the young girl to become a sacrifice to summon one of the 4 gods. He tells Miaka but she doesn't believe him and cuts off their connection. The ship begins to get caught in a storm caused by one of the Seiryū seven and Miaka, Nuriko, and Tamahome go overboard. Tamahome is electrocuted.
30	"The Flash of Battle"; Transliteration: "Tatakai no Senkō" (Japanese: 戦いの閃光)	October 26, 1995
After being attacked by lightning, Tamahome and the other two stayed in an abandoned cave and wait for Chichiri to track them down. Tamahome is still unconscious so Nuriko finds the chance to flirt with Miaka jokingly, by trying to kiss her. When awakened, Tamahome explains he has no chance to protect his loved ones, so he promised himself that he will always protect Miaka. Nuriko himself explains he also has a loved one too that he's unable to protect, which is his sister Korin. At the day she died, Nuriko began dressing like a girl in order to keep Korin with him. Just then lightning struck the cave where they were and Miaka and Tamahome began floating in the sea, and Nuriko manages to carry them off because the bracelets Taiitsukun gave him began transforming into armbands. At last, Chichiri and the others found them. While inside the ship, Soi began challenging Miaka and electrifying the others so they won't be able to save her. Miaka uses Hotohori's holy sword in order to protect herself from Soi, and she manages to defeat her. The storm Soi cast is slowly disappearing, and they finally found Hokkan, the land of Genbu, where the Shinzaho is located.
31	"Whirlpool of Doubt"; Transliteration: "Fuan no Uzu" (Japanese: 不安の渦)	November 2, 1995
When finally there, they manage to find a place to stay and there, an elder told them about the legendary Shinzaho of the Priestess of Genbu is protected by the Genbu Seven 200 years ago. By this, the group started to separate to be able to find the Shinzaho fast. Before doing so, Miaka promised herself that after she summoned Suzaku she will abandon her old world and stay with Tamahome instead. While planning of the separation inside a bar, Nuriko cuts his hair in order to protect Miaka easily. He then tells them he is now a man, but still inside he's still have the heart of a woman. They began to travel in different places, leaving Nuriko with Tamahome and Miaka. They saw an ancient writing which only a scholar can read, and Tamahome decides to follow a man whose dad is a scholar. The man's dad told them that the writing is located to where the Priestess of Genbu first appeared, and that the Shinzaho is in Mt. Koku. After hearing the news, Tamahome encountered Yui who is also in Hokkan finding the same thing, who just separated from Suboshi. At the same time, Ashitare, a warrior of Seiryū, was sent by Nakago in replacement of Soi in order to kill the Priestess. Ashitare found Miaka and Nuriko and began to attack.
32	"To Die for the Star of Suzaku"; Transliteration: "Suzaku no Hoshi ni Junjite" (Japanese: 朱雀の宿星[ほし]に殉じて)	November 9, 1995
Ashitare of Seiryuu Seven leaps to attack Miaka, but Nuriko saves her and manages to burn Ashitare by Chiriko's signal flares although he's hurt. He then told her that he's going to save her until his last breath draws, causes Miaka to think Nuriko is not a girl anymore. On the same time, Tamahome encounters Yui and tried to convince her to stop summoning Seiryū and come with him. She then told him that Tamahome is just a character in a book and that Miaka and Tamahome can't be together unless they summon Suzaku. Suboshi then came and Tamahome ran away, leaving Yui undecided of her fate. Reunited, Miaka, Nuriko and Tamahome found a house and stay there. Still mindful of what Yui said, Tamahome goes to have to drink by himself. Nuriko then approaches and tells Tamahome that he's ready to die for Miaka, admitting that he also love Miaka as a man. The next day, Nuriko decided he'll go find the Shinzaho and leave Tamahome and Miaka together to strengthen their relationship and find Chichiri and the others. Once there, when Nuriko was about to remove the large boulder blocking the cave of the hidden Shinzaho, he is found by Ashitare.
33	"Nuriko, the Eternal Farewell"; Transliteration: "Nuriko, Towa no Wakare" (Japanese: 柳宿、永遠[とわ]の別離[わかれ])	November 16, 1995
During the battle of Ashitare and Nuriko, Nuriko is stabbed through the chest by Ashitare's long claws. Though badly wounded, he manages to break Ashitare's neck. Miaka and the other Suzaku warriors sense something is wrong and begin making their way to the area they felt the disturbance from. With his blood staining the snow, Nuriko uses the last of his strength to lift the boulder out of the way so the others will be able to retrieve the Shinzaho. Miaka and Tamahome arrive to find Nuriko lying in the snow. Tamahome lights a signal fire to call Mitsukake to heal him, while Nuriko weakly encourages Miaka to stop crying because he loves her and won't leave her. Miaka goes to see where the others are, but before she walks to far, Nuriko dies. Miaka can't believe it at first and pleads with him to get up. When the others arrive and learn of his death, the warriors cry, with Tasuki also having trouble accepting it at first. Miaka separates herself from the others, deeply upset, but Tamahome comes and forces her to return and say good-bye. They come back to find that Mitsukake has used his powers to heal the wounds so Nuriko would be "beautiful" again. He also gave Miaka Nuriko's armbands for it to be able to protect her. After mourning his death a few more moments and pledging his death would not be in vain, they bury him in the snow and head towards the cave containing the Shinzaho.
34	"Guardians of Ice"; Transliteration: "Kōri no Sakimori" (Japanese: 氷の防人)	November 23, 1995
Sadly after Nuriko's death, Miaka and the remaining Suzaku Seven went inside the cave to locate the Shinzaho of Genbu. While inside, they found two of the Genbu Celestial Warriors who are later known as Tomite and Hikitsu. They tested Miaka if she is truly capable of having the Shinzaho so they froze her without her clothes, and Miaka was so cold that she could definitely die. Meanwhile, Tamahome and the others were unable to reach Miaka because the Genbu Seven separated them with Miaka using a transparent ice wall. Remembering Nuriko's sacrifice and all the people who have gone to protect her, Miaka was able to break the ice before her with the help of Nuriko remaining in Miaka and his armbands. The Genbu Seven realized she was truly capable having the Shinzaho, they agreed to give it to her. But they realized they also need the Shinzaho of Byakko in order to summon Suzaku. Just outside the cave, Ashitare's wolf form managed to steal the Shinzaho from them, and lead it to Nakago. Due to the incident, Miaka was separated from the Suzaku Seven.
35	"Hell's Mirage"; Transliteration: "Naraku no Shinkirō" (Japanese: 奈落の蜃気楼)	November 30, 1995
Upon leaving the cave with the Shinzaho it gets stolen from Miaka by Ashitare's wolf form. Miaka gives chase, but after tripping and falling, she loses sight of him. Taiitsukun suddenly appears in front of Miaka, and Miaka asks her how she can retrieve the Shinzaho. Taiitsukun tells her that by "coupling" with Nakago, she can weaken his life force, and retrieve the Shinzaho from him. Despite being conflicted, Miaka decides to do it, and heads towards the Seiryuu camp. Tamahome appears soon after, and asks Taiitsukun where Miaka has gone. Taiistukun tells him Miaka is having 'girl's problems', and he sheepishly agrees to leave her be. Tamahome leaves and Taiitsukun turns into the form of a clam. Miaka goes to the camp and finds that Mitsukake's cat has followed her. Tamahome, sensing something is amiss, doubles back towards the camp. Miaka gets hungry and smells some food and goes to a tent where Nakago is waiting. Meanwhile, Yui is mad that Nakago has left her side and decides to go back to camp. Soboshi tells her Nakago can't be trusted and she doesn't believe him. She tries to pull herself from him, but he pulls her in and kisses her. One of the other 7 yells at him. This same member shows Yui the clam shell from before. Nakago strikes Miaka with lightning and destroys the necklace Tamahome's sister made for her. He advances toward her.
36	"Trampled Love"; Transliteration: "Fuminijirareta Ai" (Japanese: 踏みにじられた愛)	December 7, 1995
Nakago tells Miaka of what he planned and about the false Taiitsukun. He also tells her that Yui is still a virgin. He also told Yui everyday that Miaka betrayed her. One day she finally believed. Everything that happened was all according to Nakago's plans. Tomo causes the other of the Suzaku to fall into his trap. Tamahome finally catches up with Miaka and runs into Nakago who insinuates that he has "coupled" with Miaka. Tamahome attacks Nakago and actually wounds him with a red lightning. Soi come to Nakago's rescue. Tamahome finds Miaka and she wakes up in a lot of pain. Miaka believes Nakago had sex with her and Tamahome just looks dumbstruck. The others are still stuck in the mirage. Miaka and Tamahome stop at a lake to rest and eat. Miaka, broken, tearfully says that she will never be able to marry Tamahome now.
37	"Bewitched Warmth"; Transliteration: "Genwaku no Nukumori" (Japanese: 幻惑のぬくもり)	December 14, 1995
Tamahome comforts Miaka, but she runs away while he is asleep. Miaka falls into a Ravine and hurts her ankle. She is saved from a giant weasel by Suboshi and passes out. Yui decides to wait for Nakago's arm to heal before proceeding to Sairou. Tamahome searches for Miaka, but cannot find her. Miaka awakens three days later in Makan Village, in Sairou. She realizes that it was actually Amiboshi who saved her, but he has amnesia and does not remember anything before being pulled out the river by his adoptive parents. Nakago admits to Tomo that Miaka is still a virgin because of a red life force that protected her from him when he tried to couple with her. Chichiri, Tasuki, Mitsukake, and Chiriko are still stuck in Tomo's illusion and are slowly being killed by the desert's harsh conditions. Tomo asks Soi to use boa-chuu jitsu, the technique which allows one to control others by weakening their life force through sexual intercourse, on Tamahome. Amiboshi's new mother fears that Miaka will help Amiboshi remember who he is so she gives her forgetfulness leaves, but accidentally gives her a dangerous dosage. Miaka is feverish and passes out. Tamahome finds Miaka, but it is actually Soi disguised by Tomo's illusion. They kiss. Keisuke and Tetsuya head to Morioka to find criminal records from the Takiko Okuda murder investigation. Amiboshi gives Miaka some of his life force and she wakes up. He asks her if she will stay with him.
38	"Dawn of the Heart"; Transliteration: "Kokoro no Yoake" (Japanese: 心の夜明け)	December 21, 1995
It is revealed that Soi slipped Tamahome a potion when they kissed at the end of the last episode. Mitsukake's cat sees through Soi's illusion and tries to warn Tamahome, but does not succeed. Amiboshi offers Miaka a forgetfulness leaves potion to help her forget her painful past and she almost accepts them, but remembers Nuriko, Tamahome, and the rest of the Suzaku Seven and declines. Tamahome refuses the fake Miaka as not to ruin any chance they may still have to summon Suzaku. Amiboshi regains his memory and Miaka resolves to find Yui and help her summon Seiryū. After Soi fails to drain Tamahome, Tomo reveals himself. Kutou soldiers attack Makan Village and Amiboshi kills them using his flute powers. After defeating the soldiers, Amiboshi senses Tomo. Tomo tells Tamahome of the rest of the Suzaku Seven who are stuck in his illusion slowly dying and attacks Tamahome. Amiboshi senses Tamahome, but Miaka does not want to see Tamahome. Amiboshi, wanting to help, goes to bring him back. As he departed his adoptive father gives him a vial of forgetfulness leaves juice (which also can be used to diminish pain from wounds). Instead of waiting for Amiboshi to return, as she was instructed, Miaka runs off to find Yui and runs into Soi.
39	"Bewitched Illusions"; Transliteration: "Ayashiki Gensō" (Japanese: 妖しき幻想)	December 25, 1995
Soi reveals to Miaka that Nakago failed to rape her and that Tomo is fighting Tamahome and has him trapped. Amiboshi helps destroys Tomo's illusion creating shell with his flute. Miaka arrives and Tamahome defeats Tomo. Miaka excitedly tells Tamahome that she is unspoiled. Amiboshi is trapped and Tamahome is stabbed and dragged off a cliff by Tomo (They only defeated an illusion of him). Tomo traps Miaka with an illusion created from her life force. He explains to Amiboshi that because of the manner in which the illusion was created Miaka is trapped inside the illusion physically, as opposed to just mentally. Tomo puts himself into the illusion as Aono, with the intention of taking Maika's virginity. He uses the illusion to convince Miaka that she has a crush on him. Miaka sees Tamahome's name in a book she is studying and becomes confused. Aono stops by and gives her his older brothers lucky exam pencil, putting an end to her confusion. Miaka agrees to go out with him. Aono asks if he can call her "Miaka" and asks her to call him "Tomo." Back in the real world, Keisuke calls their mother and explains to her that they did not return home because Miaka is studying with him and Tetsuya.
40	"Deceptive Love"; Transliteration: "Itsuwari no Koi" (Japanese: 偽りの恋)	January 4, 1996
Miaka reads about the constellations of the four gods again and is again confused, but Aono Tomo distracts her by asking her to come to his house to study later. Tamahome's master find him and releases him from the illusion he was under when he was thrown from the cliff. As Miaka and Tomo pass the library, Miaka feels like something important happened there and tries to figure it out, but Tomo distracts her with a promise of cake. Miaka discovers the cake was a lie and is distracted again by the library, which she can see from Tomo's window. He distracts her by kissing her. When she is about to give herself to him, she is confused by something she cannot remember. She remembers going into the library with Yui and going into an old book. Tomo tells her that it was just a dream but she continues to remember what happened and breaks the illusion (but is still trapped in it). Tomo has to use all of his life force to keep Miaka trapped and Amiboshi uses this opportunity to break free. He gives his strength to Miaka using his flute. She stabs Tomo in the mark on his forehead using the lucky pencil he gave her. Shin (the shell Tomo used to create illusions and trap Miaka) breaks and Miaka reappears. Amiboshi protects Miaka from Shin, but is defeated. When Tomo is about to kill him Suboshi arrives and kills Tomo. Amiboshi offers Suboshi forgetfulness leaves so that they may live in peace together. Suboshi pretends to accept them, says he loves Yui, and forces the leaves back on Amiboshi. Suboshi attacks Miaka in the same manner in which he thinks Yui was.
41	"Sunlight of Rebirth"; Transliteration: "Fukkatsu no Yōkō" (Japanese: 復活の陽光)	January 11, 1996
Tamahome, Tasuki, and the rest of the Suzaku Seven rescue Miaka from Suboshi. They arrive in Sairou and stay with Tamahome's master, Tokaki. Tamahome kisses Miaka and says that they cannot love anymore. Tokaki tells him he made the right decision and that their love would never have consummated. Miaka and Chichiri contact Hotohori through and magic mirror and provide him with a very brief (and incomplete) update on their situation. Suboshi returns Amiboshi to Makan Village. Nakago tells Yui that he loves her, Soi overhears this. Xing, Tokaki's adoptive daughter, tells Miaka a legend that if two lovers kiss at sunset atop a tower next to a nearby temple nothing will separate them. Miaka helps Xing prepare dinner. Miaka's cooking is horrible, but after she leaves the room Tamahome eats all of it. Xing is told by Tokaki to help Tamahome forget Miaka and when it appears they are about to kiss Miaka enters the room.
42	"Unbreachable Wall"; Transliteration: "Koerarenu Kabe" (Japanese: 越えられぬ壁)	January 18, 1996
Keisuke and Tetsuya finally arrive in Morioka. Miaka asks Tamahome to meet her in the tower that Xing told her the legend about. Tokaki reminds Tamahome that he and Miaka will be split up when Suzaku is summoned. While waiting at the tower, Miaka sees Yui and Nakago. After checking the police station and library, a taxi driver introduces Keisuke and Tetsuya to a friend with old newspapers on microfilm. They find the article regarding the Okuda murder and where it took place. Tamahome goes to the tower and finds Miaka's hair tie. The rest of the Suzaku Seven join him, and Tasuki fries a monster about to eat him. Tokaki and his wife, Subaru, tell them that Tatara, the guardian of the Shinzaho of Byakko has been taken. Nakago finds Miaka sneaking into where he and Yui are staying. Miboshi, one of the Seiryū Seven, steals Miaka's voice and Nakago knocks her unconscious. The Suzaku Seven follow Miaka. Keisuke and Testuya arrive at the location where the Okuda murder took place and find it is called Genbu Grotto. Miaka wakes up in a cell with Tatara and Yui enters.
43	"Farewell Reunion"; Transliteration: "Ketsubetsu no Raidō" (Japanese: 決別の来同)	January 25, 1996
Yui tells Miaka that she cannot keep fighting with her. She leads Miaka and Tatara out of their cell and Tatara presents Miaka with the Shinzaho of Byakko. Yui takes the Shinzaho and locks Miaka and Tatara in a room. Keisuke and Tetsuya meet the aged Priestess of Byakko. Tatara and Miaka escape. Tatara goes ahead to convince Yui to return the Shinzaho, but Miboshi appears. Miaka is found by Tamahome, Tasuki, and Chiriko. Miaka, the rest of the Suzaku Seven, and Takaki and Subaru catch up to Tatara. Tatara is taken hostage by Miboshi. He defeats Miboshi but uses the last of his strength to do so. The Priestess of Byakko dies and Keisuke and Tetsuya watch as a much younger version of her spirit and Tatara's spirit meet and ascend together. The dying Miboshi possesses Chiriko.
44	"Moment of Battle"; Transliteration: "Setsuna no Kōbō" (Japanese: 刹那の攻防)	February 1, 1996
Miboshi of the Seiryū Seven enters Chiriko's body, because his old body had died. He then used Chiriko to defeat Miaka and the remaining Suzaku Seven, and therefore controlled his body. Chichiri made a barrier or shield around themselves to protect them from Miboshi, but Miaka's foot stepped away from the shield and caused her danger. Meanwhile, Yui and Nakago were on their way to the ceremony of summoning Seiryū, after they successfully gathered the two Shinzaho. Yui then told Nakago that she will save her third wish for him after they summon the god. On the other hand, Miaka was in great danger of Miboshi's hands, and Miaka tried to plead for Chiriko to wake up. Then, Subaru and Tokaki of the Byakko Seven became teenagers again using Subaru's power for making physical bodies be the ones they were before. Tokaki saved Miaka and Subaru returned Miaka's voice. Meanwhile, Chiriko is slowly waking up, slowly controlling his own self, but Miboshi is much stronger. But soon afterward, Chiriko was able to control himself from Miboshi, and figured out that he could kill Miboshi by killing himself. He then stabbed himself using Miboshi's rattle. Chiriko is slowly dying that time, and he provided the scroll Taiitsukun gave him to Miaka. After saying farewell, Miaka, Tamahome and Chichiri ran towards the ceremony of summoning Seiryū, leaving Mitsukake and Tasuki with Chiriko up until the very end of his life. Miaka, Tamahome and Chichiri encountered Nakago who just lured them into a trap. But when they finally reached the roof where the ceremony will be held, it was too late for them because Yui is finally summoning Seiryū.
45	"Divergent Light"; Transliteration: "Bunki no Hikari" (Japanese: 分岐の光)	February 8, 1996
Yui succeeds in summoning Seiryū. Seiryū turns into a person, enters Yui to grant her his holy power, and they disappear. Summoning Seiryuu causes a shockwave and Chichiri teleports Miaka and the Suzaku Seven back to Konan. Yui wakes up in Kutou and makes her first wish: "Let Suzaku's strength be sealed away forevermore." Miaka and the Suzaku Seven meet Hotohori's new empress, and he tells Miaka that she can marry Tamahome since she is no longer a priestess. Kutou begins to invade and the Suzaku Seven decide they will fight, despite losing their powers. Keisuke and Tetsuya find out that Genbu Grotto was created by being bringing a beast god into the world. Nakago and Soi look into Tomo's shell, which was all they could recover of him, and see the world the priestesses came from. They talk and Nakago rejects Soi when she confesses her love for him. The Suzaku Seven join the battle against Kutou and encounter the Seiryuu Seven, but are no match for them without their powers. Tasuki throws Hotohori's holy sword at Nakago, but Soi sacrifices herself to protect him. Yui uses her second wish to return herself and Miaka to their world. Miaka wakes up in her school and Tamahome is there as well.
46	"Boy of Fact & Fiction"; Transliteration: "Kyojitsu no Shōnen" (Japanese: 虚実の少年)	February 15, 1996
Keisuke heads home and arrives as Miaka is calling. Yui goes home as well. Nakago tells Suboshi that they will see Yui again. Tasuki's bandits arrive to support the Konan forces and Kutou retreats. Tamahome wakes up and wants to go back to help immediately. Keisuke, who is researching The Universe of the Four Gods with Toki, the Priestess of Byakko's grandson, calls Tetsuya and tells him that the story has moved into their world. The book foreshadows that Nakago will soon be entering their world. After discovering that Tamahome came back with Miaka, Yui contacts Nakago using an earring he gave her and he tells her he will send her support. Hotohori prepares to lead his army against Kutou personally. Miaka, Tamahome, and Keisuke go to meet Tetsuya, who still has The Universe of the Four Gods.
47	"Repose of the Soul's Light"; Transliteration: "Chinkon no Sora" (Japanese: 鎮魂の空)	February 22, 1996
While Keisuke, Miaka, and Tamahome are waiting in a restaurant for Tetsuya, Keisuke notices Tamahome does not have a shadow. Keisuke tells Miaka he does not think she will be able to re-enter the book and Tamahome notices he has no reflection. Tamahome overhears them talking about how he is not "real" and he runs off. Miaka chases after him, but finds Yui and Suboshi while looking for him. Miaka tries to talk to Yui, but Suboshi chases her off. Mitsukake gives his life to save a baby and heal many wounded soldiers (on both sides). Tamahome sees a romance scene being filmed and remembers that he was going to stay with Miaka no matter what. Suboshi finally catches up to Miaka, but Tamahome arrives and tells Miaka that he is hers because she created his world by reading The Universe of the Four Gods.
48	"Even Wagering on This Life"; Transliteration: "Kono Inochi Kaketemo" (Japanese: この命賭けても)	February 29, 1996
Tamahome and Suboshi fight. Part of Suboshi's weapon chases Tamahome and he tries to lead it back to Suboshi. Suboshi sees through this, but before he can dodge the spirits of Tamahome's siblings appear hold him in place. Nakago explains to Hotohori that the war is a distraction and he is turning Kutou's armies back on itself before moving on to conquer Miaka's world. Hotohori attacks Nakago, riding through Nakago's powerful life energy attack to do so. Hotohori stabs Nakago, but is fatally wounded by the energy. Keisuke gives Miaka the book and she tries to save Hotohori by talking to him. Hotohori warns Miaka that he could not stop "him" and after talking to Miaka for a while he dies. Keisuke asks Tamahome to go back into the book by himself.
49	"Wedding Celebration"; Transliteration: "Kashoku no Ten" (Japanese: 華燭の典)	March 7, 1996
Keisuke tells Miaka that summoning a beast god means becoming a sacrifice for it. Yui calls, Miaka tells her that Suboshi is dead, and they both agree to go to school the next day. Keisuke begs Tamahome to return to the Universe of the Four Gods. Miaka informs Yui about Nakago's deceit and gives her a letter written by Okuda explaining what the beast gods are. Yui runs off and notices scales on her arm. Nakago kills the Emperor of Kutou and orders his family and government killed. Miaka runs home and catches Tamahome preparing to return. Miaka begs Tamahome not to leave and Tamahome asks to have a wedding ceremony. They have a wedding ceremony and Nakago appears before Yui. Yui confirms what Miaka told her and runs away from Nakago. Tamahome finds Yui and Nakago catches up. Nakago tells Tamahome his plans for conquest and Tamahome tells Nakago that they are characters in a book. They fight, but Tamahome is still no match for Nakago.
50	"Atonement"; Transliteration: "Shokuzai no Toki" (Japanese: 贖罪の瞬間[とき])	March 14, 1996
Tamahome continues to get beaten by Nakago. Miaka finds Yui while looking for Tamahome, but Yui is trapped in a barrier. Nakago senses Miaka running into his barrier and finishes Tamahome. Miaka tries to break the barrier and Nakago arrives. Keisuke uses the book to ask Tasuki and Chichiri to come save Miaka, using the bag she left there to enter the real world. Nakago attacks Miaka and threatens to kill her if Yui does not grant his wish for eternal life and immortality. As Yui prepares to use her last wish, Seiryuu, in beast form, appears and Yui disappears. Nakago advances on Miaka to end her, but Tasuki and Chichiri appear. Yui appears to Miaka while Miaka is unconscious from Nakago's attack.
51	"Entrusted Hope"; Transliteration: "Takusareta Kibō" (Japanese: 託された希望)	March 21, 1996
Tasuki and Chichiri then appears in Miaka's world using her backpack she left in the book, trying to protect Miaka. But meanwhile, Miaka is encountering a strange dream with Yui in it, and they seemed to have a serious talk. On the other hand, realizing they don't have powers anymore, Tasuki and Chichiri decided they would join their companions in heaven after they had killed Nakago. But before striking, Miaka began to say the spell to summon Suzaku, revealing that Yui's third wish is for Miaka to be able to summon the beast god. Tasuki and Chichiri have their powers back after Miaka successfully summoned and made the god appear. Miaka made her first wish, to make Yui return from Seiryū devouring her. After that she felt herself weaken and realized Suzaku is beginning to devour her. The Suzaku warriors are still no match for Nakago, and he can still defeat them, but because of the said "Power of Friendship", Nuriko, Hotohori, Mitsukake and Chiriko appeared and saved Miaka. Later on a daydream occurred, imagining all of them were on Miaka's world and preparing for the marriage of Miaka and Tamahome. Tamahome had a talk with his father in his dream, who encouraged Tamahome to return to Miaka. Tamahome appears and the final battle of Tamahome and Nakago begins.
52	"For My Loved One"; Transliteration: "Itōshii Hito no Tame ni" (Japanese: いとおしい人のために)	March 28, 1996
Tamahome and Nakago engage in their final battle. Even with all of his powers restored with the summoning of Suzaku, Tamahome is still considerably weaker than his adversary, and Miaka and her Celestial Warriors work to channel all of their powers to him. This plan is still insufficient to defeat Nakago, and as a last resort, Miaka decides to seal Seiryū away using Suzaku's powers. Nakago loses all of his powers, and Tamahome delivers his final blow: he punches a hole through Nakago's chest. After having been defeated, Nakago tells the story of his bitter past, his ascent to power, and his plight for revenge. The Suzaku Seven's final enemy falls at last, and they urge Miaka to use her final wish to ensure that she and Tamahome could stay together. However, her wish is to restore her world's peace and serenity, and Tamahome consents. Her mission fulfilled, Miaka and her Warriors say a tearful good-bye, and she shares a final kiss with Tamahome as the two worlds are separated and Miaka changed for the better. Days pass, and she discovers a letter which Tamahome had left for her. She learns of his promise to love her through all time and space, and his wish to find her again. Miaka and Yui eventually pass their high school entrance exams, and one school day, Keisuke leads them to a young man who is revealed to be Tamahome, still wearing his wedding ring. The story ends as Miaka lapses into tears of joy.

== Original video animations ==
=== OVA 1 ===
The first Fushigi Yûgi original video animation, OVA 1, was directed by Hajime Kamegaki and is set one year after the end of the main series. The OVA was released by Bandai Visual as a single disc volume in Japan on October 25, 1996. It was re-released in Japan on August 25, 2002.

Geneon Entertainment, which licensed the entire Fushigi Yûgi anime series for Region 1 release, combined this OVA with OVA 2 into a single box set titled Fushigi Yûgi: The Mysterious Play OVA. Released June 5, 2001, the two-disc set included English and Japanese language tracks, and English subtitle track, an image gallery, and a color booklet with an episode list, character images, and the credits for the Japanese cast and crew. Geneon's English dub version of the series premiered on the International Channel on December 30, 2003/ The Fushigi Yûgi: The Mysterious Play OVA set is now out of print.

The opening theme for the three-episode series is "Before the Day Breaks" (夜が明ける前に, Yo ga Akeru Mae Ni) by Akemi Satō and Saori Ishizuka's "Ashita no Watashi o Shinjitai" (明日の私を信じたい) is used for the ending theme.

No.	Title	Original DVD release
1	"Lost Ties"; Transliteration: "Ushinaishi Kizuna" (Japanese: 失ひし絆)	October 25, 1996
Tamahome has been living in Miaka's world for one year. Joined by Yui, Keisuke, and Tatsuya, the pair go to visit the grave of Takiko Okuda, the Priestess of Genbu. Suddenly, Tamahome is pulled back into the Universe of the Four Gods. Tamahome goes to palace in Konan to see what happened. When he arrives, he realizes fifty years have passed since he was last there, and Hotohori's grandson is now the Emperor. Tamahome attempts to enter the Suzaku shrine, but is rejected by the Suzaku barrier then lashed by the palace guards and thrown out of Konan. Confused, Tamahome is approached by a woman who calls him Nakago. Tamahome is horrified to realize that the "ogre" symbol on his forehead has been replaced by the Nakago's former symbol. Meanwhile, the others go to get the book from the library, but the room has been burned. They suspect the book was stolen, then Yui has a vision showing that if the book is opened, the current set of priestesses will disappear and four more women called into the book to take their place.
2	"Sorrowful Flash"; Transliteration: "Kanashiki Senkō" (Japanese: 悲しき閃光)	October 25, 1996
The woman who rescued Tamahome introduces herself as Kaen. She tells him that when Tamahome defeated Nakago, Nakago didn't die but went into a deep sleep. When he revived, Nakago took over Tamahome's body, and Tamahome's soul went into Nakago's body. Confused, Tamahome he can't believe he is really Nakago. Kaen offers him a bowl of sake to help calm him, which he drinks. After he falls asleep, Kaen undresses and offer to use Soi's celestial ability to raise his chi through sex. Later, Tamahome fights with Kouji, the leader of the Tasuki's former band of bandits, who also sees Tamahome as Nakago. During the battle, Tamahome unleashes Nakago's blue chi attack killing many of the bandits and fatally wounding Kouji. Kouji tells Tamahome that only a year has passed since the summoning, then pulls out a bomb saying he will bring Tamahome back. As the blast envelops them, Kaen changes into Tomo and reveals the sake was full of kodoku, the drug that once caused Tamahome to almost kill Miaka. Nakago says anything he sees since he arrived in Konan was an illusion made by Tomo, but the kodoku in the sake was real. In the real world, the group have confirmed that all of the priestesses will disappear and that Takiko's existence is slowly being erased. Yui goes into a trance and is pulled into the book. Meanwhile, Chichiri, who felt Tamahome's chi, and Tasuki meet with Suboshi, who is using his brother Amiboshi's body. Tomo arrives with Yui, who is now the Priestess of Genbu, and two children who are her first Genbu warriors. Nakago/Tamahome also appears. Realizing Yui was the one who stole the book, Miaka goes in after her.
3	"Parting... and Then"; Transliteration: "Betsuri... Soshite" (Japanese: 別離...そして)	October 25, 1996
Afraid "Nakago" is going to hurt Yui, the Genbu warriors attack him. Chichiri blocks them and knocks them out to protect them. Nakago uses a chi blast to destroy Tomo's shin, returning Yui to normal. Tomo escapes to a chamber where he begs someone to forgive his failure, but the person kills him. Taiitsukun pops in and explains that Miaka and Yui's summoning of their gods at the same time has thrown off the usual 100 year cycle, and that everything that happened with Tamahome since he met Kaen was an illusion. The man who killed Tomo reveals himself to be Tenkou, the god Nakago once served, and captures Yui in a globe. Nuriko, Chiriko, Mitsukake and Hotohori materialize as well, as a precursor to Miaka's arrival. Tenkou attacks her, but a Nyan-Nyan protects her. Suboshi uses his Ryuseisui to shatter the globe holding Yui, after Amiboshi assures him it is okay. Before he dies Suboshi tells Yui that he loves her. Tamahome struggles against the spell of the kodoku, but he finally breaks free when he hears Miaka calling him. Yui uses her two of her wishes as the Priestess of Genbu to seal Tenkou and to revive Takiko. She then must use her last wish to permanently seal the book, severing the connection between the two worlds. Miaka and Tamahome tearfully say goodbye, and he returns the ring she gave him. As the two crying girls are being transported home, Miaka was still holding the ring, but Yui tells it to return where it belongs and it falls back into the book world. The next day, as they head to school, they decide to skip. In the book world, Taiitsukun tells Tamahome that if he wants to be with Miaka, he must find seven globes which will allow him to be reborn in the real world. Tamahome grins and says he only lives for Miaka. In the real world, Miaka and Yui visit a restaurant, where a waiter wearing Miaka's ring – Tamahome, reincarnated as Taka – approaches to serve them.

=== OVA 2 ===
The second Fushigi Yûgi original video animation, OVA 2, was directed by Hajime Kamegaki.

- Star by Akemi Satō (OP)
- "Yume Kamo Shirenai" (夢かもしれない) by The SHE (ED)

No.	Title	Original DVD release
4	"Enchantment's Quickening"; Transliteration: "Kowaku no Taidō" (Japanese: 蠱惑の胎動)	May 25, 1997
Taka and Miaka have been together for eight months now. Miaka's new classmate, Shigyou, runs for President of the student council, while Yui also attempts to run for office. Meanwhile, Keisuke and Tetsuya have formed a club in their own school about the Universe of the Four Gods, which a new student named Ms Kamashiro shows interest in and joins. Back at Miaka's school, Shigyou watches from a distance, declaring that humans hold "the true nature of evil" deep in their hearts, and while weaker alone, together they would readily turn on those they deem weaker. Miaka is tricked into meeting Taka on the roofdeck of the school, but realizes that someone has tricked them both. A group of Miaka's classmates trap them on the roof, acting hostile and accusing Miaka of flirting with Shigyou despite being in a committed relationship, an act they deem punishable. Miaka is thrown from the school's roof, and Taka jumps after her to catch her, but they both seem to be headed for disaster. It's then that Suzaku, who has been calling to Miaka for help, arrives and saves them with a scroll of the Universe of the Four Gods before they can hit the ground. Yui, seeing the red light of Suzaku, runs outside to investigate, but runs into Shigyou and Miaka's classmates. After Shigyou wishes her luck in the coming student council elections, Yui finds Suzaku's red scroll on the ground, and realizes where Miaka and Taka might have ended up. Meanwhile, finding themselves suddenly in the book/scroll's world again, Miaka and Taka run encounter Tasuki, who Taka regrettably can only barely remember ever knowing. Chichiri later joins them, supplying Taka with an orb in Tasuki's possession that turns out to contain Tamahome's memories of meeting Tasuki. The reunited friends then head to Mt. Taikyoku for answers, where they are reunited with the spirits of Hotohori, Nuriko, Chiriko and Mitsukake. After Chichiri gives his own memory orb to Taka, who then remembers Chichiri and more of his life as Tamahome with Miaka, Miaka realizes that finding each Suzaku warrior's orbs and returning them to Taka would give him his memories back. Taiitsukun, however, informs her that it won't be quite so easy; conflict and evil are brewing, and it's up to Miaka and the Suzaku Seven to find a way to fight back and win. While this reunion happens in the scroll, in the real world, Shigyou has won the student council presidency, seemingly by default – Yui has not shown up to the election. He makes a speech to the student body about rising up against authority and "being reborn." His speech hypnotizes the students, who applaud him, seeming to fuel his power, which causes a massive earthquake on Mt. Taikyoku. Miaka and the warriors don't have enough time to react, and Miaka finds herself in danger. Tasuki attempts to save her.
5	"Child of Silence"; Transliteration: "Chinmoku no Warabe" (Japanese: 沈黙の童)	May 25, 1997
Just before a massive earthquake caused by Tenkou brings down Mt. Taikyou, Taiitsukun explains the memory orbs; Miaka and her friends must find the orbs and return them to Taka before the enemy gets his hands on them, or else Taka/Tamahome would disappear forever. As Mt. Taikyoku collapses, Taiitskun uses her power to protect everyone, but Miaka falls. Tasuki attempts to save her, and wakes up in a lake holding an unconscious Miaka. Despite not being a good swimmer, Tasuki manages to pull himself and Miaka to the shore of the lake, and resuscitates her with mouth-to-mouth. Upon reuniting with Chichiri and Taka, Miaka decides they should head to the palace to find their other friends or the orbs. Back in the real world, Yui asks Shigyou why he made her vice president. Unsatisfied by his answer, she leaves. As Yui heads down stairs, a glass window explodes, injuring her. Shigyou then reveals himself as a demon named Renkou, and declares Miaka his enemy. In the world of the book, Miaka and the group arrive at the palace. After explaining their situation to the prime minister, the group are taken to Empress Houki, who is revealed to have fallen ill after giving birth to her son, and has gone mute, seemingly deliberately/by choice. Hotohori, trapped in his spirit form and sent back to the palace by Taiitsukun's power, mourns the fact that he isn't capable of comforting his widow, who cannot see, hear or feel him. Leaving him with Houki, the group encounters Boushin, Hotohori's toddler son, and the future emperor of Kounan. They attempt to speak with him, but the prime minister reveals that he has not spoken a single word since birth, rendering him mute like his mother. To make matters worse, Boushin also cannot see or hear Hotohori, although he seems aware of his presence. They are suddenly attacked by a terrible monster hiding in the teddy bear that Boushin has been carrying around. The creature traps the mortals, who are hesitant to use their powers to attack the monster for fear of hurting the toddler. Fortunately, before the monster can hurt Boushin, Hotohori's spirit enters him and uses his body to defeat the creature. Realizing he now has a physical form, albeit that of a child, Hotohori runs to Houki, who recognizes him when he greets her, and speaks for the first time in a year and a half. Now reunited with her husband, Houki reveals that a warm stone entered her body while in labor, and feeling the warmth leave her body when the baby is born; they all realize that Boushin is in possession of Hotohori's memory orb. A second assassin creature, disguised as a servant preparing to feed Boushin, attacks the toddler. With the help of Tasuki and Nyan-Nyan, Hotohori is able to defeat the monster. This heroic act seems to reveal Hotohori's spirit to his widow and son, but when they attempt to embrace, Boushin merely passes right through Hotohori. Seeing the family's pain, Taka offers Hotohori the use of his body. With Taka's help, Hotohori is able to hold his son for the first time, and hears him speak his first word – "Papa." This in turn gives Taka access to Hotohori's memory orb, and as he sees Tamahome's memories of Hotohori, Hotohori reminds him that Tamahome and Miaka's love has always been so strong that not even the world's most potent controlling potion could tear them apart. The touching reunion and moment is disturbed again, but this time by Suzaku's red light suddenly engulfing Miaka and Taka, taking them back to the real world. Meanwhile, somewhere else in Kounan, a young man with a familiar resemblance to another Suzaku warrior prays at an altar bearing a glass orb.
6	"Manifestation of Rebirth"; Transliteration: "Tensei no Hatsuro" (Japanese: 転生の発露)	May 25, 1997
Miaka and Taka are returned to the real world, finding themselves in the bedroom of a bandaged Yui. Yui tells them of what happened, and warns Miaka not to return to the school until they figure out who Renkou/Shigyou truly is. Taka decides to speak with Keisuke and Tetsuya the following day. After their discussion, Taka tries to reach Miaka, only to realize she isn't home. The boys split up to find her, Tetsuya off to Yui's and Taka to Miaka's. He runs into Miru Kamishiru, the new member of the research club Keisuke and Tetsuya had formed with Taka. While introducing herself, Miru falls faint. When Taka takes her back to his place to tend to her, she bites his ear and paralyzes him with pain. She drops her demure act, laughing as she sarcastically hopes that he "makes it in time." Miaka, meanwhile, has returned to school despite having told Yui and Taka that she wouldn't. At first, everything and everyone seems normal, but at the end of the school day, her mind-controlled classmates corner her again. They take her to Renkou, who tells her that she's about to be killed and that it will be made to look like suicide. Taka fortunately makes it just in time to save her before she can be harmed, and together, he and Miaka use the scroll to defeat Renkou. The scroll seems to become sentient, or controlled by Suzaku, dropping Renkou off the roof of the school as Miaka and Taka are taken back to the universe of the scroll. They find themselves reunited with Tasuki, Chichiri and the spirits of the others as they try to find a way to break into Nuriko's childhood home. Nuriko reveals that his older brother, in pain and bitter about the loss of both of his siblings, is refusing to give up a crystal ball that had once belonged to Nuriko, but now houses his memory orb. As Taka takes hold of the crystal ball, a creature, planted in Taka's body by "Miru's" bite, breaks out and attacks. Chichiri is able to keep it at bay and do his best to protect Taka, who falls unconscious but cannot be detached from the creature safely. The ruckus wakes Rokou, Nuriko's brother, who tries to leave with the crystal ball in an effort to protect one of the last of Nuriko's possessions that he has. Miaka tries to run after him on her own, only to be stopped by Tasuki long enough for him to offer her his help on horseback. After a brief argument stalls them, Miaka is attacked by a venomous snake. Tasuki jumps in front of her with his horse to protect her, and he and the horse are bitten instead. Although he's able to kill the snake, the snake's venom courses through him. Miaka saves him by sucking it out of his body. This gives Miaka the idea to try the same with Taka, as the creature seems to be attached to his blood. Nuriko, who has gone after his brother himself, finds them on the road and takes them back to the house. Because of Miisu's (the true identity of Miru) spell, which has created an idol made out of Taka's blood, Miaka's attempts to suck the poison out only serves to hurt him more. When Nuriko's attempts to convince his brother to help them by giving up the crystal ball fail, Chiriko attempts to possess Rokou's body, but with Rokou's heart being closed and unwilling, Chiriko fails. He tearfully shames Rokou for wallowing in grief, calling him a disgrace for being too cowardly to help. Rokou finally springs into action, giving his arm to a spasming Taka before he can bite his tongue off. Rokou speaks to Nuriko about being unable to accept his death and feeling as though he had never been a good enough older brother to him. Rokou's courage helps the warriors finally defeat Miisu's creature.
7	"The Flame of Friendship"; Transliteration: "Yûgi no Honō" (Japanese: 友誼の焔)	August 25, 1998
Taka is reunited with his/Tamahome's memories of Nuriko's strength, and the group spend the night in Nuriko's home. Before they can rest, Miaka and Taka are interrupted by Miisu, who paralyzes them both and reveals her spell and motivation. She attempts to control Taka into killing Miaka with his bare hands, but Taka uses a reawakened life force power to destroy the idol Miisu had made from his blood, revealing that his true power and motivation lies in loving and protecting Miaka forever. Tenkou then reveals himself, trapping Taka and Miaka alone with himself, Miisu and Renhou's unconscious body. With the rest of the Suzaku Seven unable to reach the couple, Tenkou steals the memories that Taka had already managed to recover, and Miaka can only watch as Tenkou destroys them. Before leaving, triumphantly feeding on Miaka's rage and pain, Tenkou displays more of his cruelty by disposing of Miisu and Renhou, who had outlived their usefulness to him. The next morning, both Taka and Miaka are distraught over what Tenkou's victory has done. Tasuki, who has been navigating some new feelings about Miaka that he is yet to understand, wonders how and why Miaka would stay with someone who seems to cause her nothing but pain and tears. While wandering alone with his thoughts, Tasuki is attacked by a mysterious rush of water. Taka, after an encouraging conversation with Nuriko about his love for Miaka, finds Tasuki in the woods, only to be attacked and incapacitated by Tasuki, who angrily shames him for hurting Miaka before threatening to take her for himself. In the real world, Yui suddenly falls to her knees, weak and intoxicated, and realizes Miaka is drinking alcohol. In the scroll, Yui's realization is proven to be correct; Tasuki has taken Miaka to a tavern and supplied her with plenty of food and drink. He later takes a drunk Miaka to a private room, where he tells her of his feelings for her, and his anger at Taka for always making her cry. Tasuki attempts to force himself on her, stopping in shock when he realizes she's crying. Taka arrives just then, and although he tries to talk Tasuki down, Tasuki attacks him, determined to keep him away from Miaka. More tears from Miaka, who tells him that she cries for Taka out of love for him, shocks Tasuki back to his senses. Refusing to give in to betraying his friends, Tasuki ashamedly turns his tessen on himself, unintentionally breaking the spell he was under, and is saved by Mitsukake. Although Miaka and Taka readily forgive Tasuki, he apologizes profusely, telling everyone of the water in the woods. Before he can explain any further, the water returns, abducts Miaka, and traps everyone.
8	"The Transience of a Water Mirror"; Transliteration: "Hakanaki Mizukagami" (Japanese: 儚き水鏡)	August 25, 1998
Trapped in the raging magic floods, Chichiri calls out the name Hikou, demanding he show himself. The group is then shown a memory of a terrible event in Chichiri's past that resulted in the death of Hikou, Chichiri's best friend. Hikou reveals he has arrived to take his revenge on Chichiri by taking away everything he cares about. He leaves with Miaka and renders Chichiri unconscious. Upon waking, Chichiri confirms the memory that was shown to his friends, revealing that he and Hikou had loved the same girl, a young woman Chichiri would have married if she hadn't turned from him in shame after being unfaithful to him with Hikou. The great flood that had ravaged the town had taken the lives of both the girl and Hikou, and although Chichiri had tried to save Hikou, he was injured by a log, resulting in the scar in his eye and causing him to let go of Hikou, who drowned in the flood. Because of this, Chichiri is unsure he can face Hikou and the past he had left behind. Mitsukake encourages him by revealing that he too had lost family in the great flood, and had been strengthened by Shouka, his beloved. His regret in being unable to save her from death twice had reminded him that he was given powers to protect people, and gave him the strength to let go and set himself free. When Taka offers to go find Hikou and Miaka himself, Chichiri decides he himself will go. In Hikou's lair, Hikou reveals he has become a demon god, and is using Miaka's body to put pressure on the other world with his powers, robbing people of their reason and turning their baser desires and passions against themselves and each other. He demonstrates his power by trying to use his power on Yui while she bathes, attempting to make her reveal her bitterness about Miaka and her selfishness. But Yui, not even knowing that Miaka can hear her, proves that her love and concern for Miaka and Taka are sincere. Angered, Hikou fills Miaka's bubble with water, slowly drowning her. Chichiri, along with Tasuki – who still feels shame and wants to atone for what he tried to do to Miaka and Taka, and vowing vengeance on Hikou for doing that to him – and Taka, arrives to save Miaka. Despite Tasuki's and Taka's best attempts, they cannot defeat Hikou. Chichiri decides to trap Hikou himself, using his own body and magic cloak to trap him while demanding that Tasuki set fire to them to release Miaka. Tasuki, at first, cannot do it, as he is plagued by memories of Chiriko's selfless sacrifice and death. It takes encouragement from Taka for Tasuki to find the strength to do as Chichiri asks, and Taka finds a way to both defeat Hikou and save Chichiri. Miaka is freed from her water trap, while Hikou and Chichiri reconcile; Hikou apologizes for what happened with Chichiri's betrothed, and Chichiri apologizes for the events that resulted in Hikou's death. As Chichiri promises Hikou that he will always be his dearest friend, Hikou dies and returns to water, begging Chichiri to forgive him. Miaka, Tasuki, Chichiri and Taka return to the others, where Taka and Tasuki fall asleep out of exhaustion. While those who are awake discuss, a demon god named Yousue attacks, including the sp and traps them, including the spirits, in nearly invisible threads. Before worse damage can be done, a bolt of red energy kills Yousue. Their savior is revealed to be Tamahome, much to everyone's shock.
9	"To Be With You Tomorrow"; Transliteration: "Ashita Au Tame ni" (Japanese: 未来(あした) 逢うために)	August 25, 1998
Taka and Tasuki awaken, only to realize that Taka has no reflection in a mirror. Taka, frightened of what this could mean, begs Tasuki not to tell anyone, especially Miaka. Things get worse when Chichiri alerts them of trouble. In the real world, a military ship crashes into an island form that has seemingly appeared out of nowhere. The impact releases a strange light from the island-like form, which destroys the ship and sinks it. Back in the scroll, Tamahome tells Miaka and the Suzaku warriors how he has come to be with them; having sensed that Taka's form would not survive much longer, Suzaku awakened Tamahome's sleeping form, and had ordered him to return to Miaka. Tenkou's power, apparently, has gotten far too strong, and although the plan had been for Tamahome and Taka – his "phantom replacement" – to eventually merge, this would no longer work, and Suzaku requires Tamahome's strength. Taka is distraught by this, feeling as though everything they had done for him to be reborn to join Miaka and for him to become who he once was has been for nothing, since Suzaku has decided to wake Tamahome anyway. Although the warriors see how this is plausible, they are somewhat reticent to accept this, although they voice that they do. Miaka, in shock and confusion, faints. While she's unconscious, Taka makes the decision to leave, feeling as though there is no more reason to stick around. He returns Tamahome's keepsakes to him, asking him to take care of Miaka. The Suzaku Seven try to convince him to stay, reminding him that he, not Tamahome, had gotten them where they are now, from lending Hotohori his body so he could hold his son, to believing in the goodness and courage of Tasuki, but Taka refuses to stay – his presence will just confuse and hurt Miaka. He is taken back to his room, where Keisuke confronts him for giving up and walking away after everything he and Miaka had been through. Back in the scroll, Miaka has awakened and realized that Taka is nowhere to be found. She searches in vain for him, while Tamahome decides to tell Miaka "everything." Before accomplishing this, however, he appears to Taka in a mirror in the real world, and reveals his true nature to him—that he had been the phantom, until Tenkou stole all of Taka's memory orbs, including those that hadn't yet been found by Miaka and the others, and planted them in Tamahome, reversing their roles. Horrified and angered, Taka wanders the streets alone. Tamahome finds Miaka and tells him that Taka had made a "hard" decision to leave, knowing he couldn't stay because he was only a shadow. He tries to convince Miaka that he is the Tamahome she has always loved, and she needs to forget about Taka. Despite his best attempts, however, Miaka cannot forget Taka, and she can sense that there is "something wrong" with Tamahome. Taka, finding strength in his love for Miaka, calls her to him, and she is returned to him in the real world by the real Suzaku's power. While the lovers happily reunite, a news update reports that the island that had appeared in the Pacific is headed to Tokyo. While Tetsuya and Yui discuss whether they should warn the authorities of Tenkou's impending arrival, Keisuke realizes that Tamahome is up to something. Tasuki and Chichiri ask Tamahome where Miaka has gone. Tamahome, angered that Miaka has left her, attacks his former friends as Tenkou reveals himself and his control over Tamahome. As Tasuki and the Suzaku warriors decide to challenge Tenkou and Tamahome in the name of Miaka and Taka's love, Taka and Miaka make plans of their own in the real world. They bid goodbye to Yui, who belatedly realizes that the couple mean to go back into the scroll to fight, and may never return. Taka and Miaka are brought directly to Tenkou's lair, where Tamahome, as the demon god Yousue, immediately traps and wounds Miaka. Tamahome challenges Taka, blaming Miaka for hurting him by choosing Taka over him. Taka, in turn, accuses Tamahome of being jealous of him, and momentarily breaks through his resolve. This only serves to anger Tamahome further, who then declares that he refuses to lose to Taka and to himself. He fires a bolt of red energy and thinks Taka is defeated, only for the smoke to clear and reveal that Miaka broke free of her trap and jumped in front of Taka to protect him. As Miaka lays dying in Taka's arms, the Suzaku warriors – the spirits aided by Nyan-Nyan – finally break through the first of Tenkou's barriers, only to find Taka wounded and Miaka dead. This has given Tenkou enough time and power to regain a form in which he can return to the real world and conquer as a god the way he has always wanted to. Taka, frozen in shock, is awakened by the voice of Miaka, who reminds him that he is stronger than he thinks he is. She promises that she already is and always will be with him. Taka finally understands his strength and purpose, and with the help of Miaka, finally defeats Tamahome by merging with him at last. Suzaku returns a fully formed Taka, carrying Miaka in his arms, to the real world to confront Tenkou. The rest of the Suzaku Seven join them, prepared to defend Taka and Miaka as they always have. Before anything can happen, Taka and Miaka sacrifice their lives and begin to invoke Suzaku, who is joined by Seiryū, Byakko and Genbu. The reawakened Suzaku reminds Tenkou that he was never a god, but merely a mortal whose greed and corruption led him to be executed for sorcery in the Universe of the Four Gods. The Four Gods come together to seal Tenkou away forever. The Suzaku Seven are returned to Mt. Taikyoku, where Taiitsukun explains that Taka and Miaka had given up their physical forms to bring Suzaku back and save both the real world and the Universe of the Four Gods. Taiitsukun offers Taka and Miaka a choice of where to be returned to physical form. Although Miaka at first rejoices in the thought of staying in this Universe, the Suzaku warriors convince them both to return to the real world. Miaka awakens in the real world to Taka promising that he is there with her.

=== Fushigi Yûgi: Eikoden ===
Fushigi Yûgi: Eikoden was originally released on four single episode DVDs starting on December 21, 2001, and with a new episode released every two months. Geneon USA owned the license for the Region 1 release of the series, and put them together into a single volume named Fushigi Yûgi: Eikoden that was released on November 11, 2002. This release is now out of print.

Unlike previous OVAs, this OVA series used digital ink and paint.

Yoko Ueno's song "Chijō no Seiza" (地上の星座) is used for the series opening theme in all episodes, as well as for the ending theme in the last episode. The first three episodes use "Yes – Koko ni Eien ga Aru" (YES-ここに永遠がある-), performed by Takehito Koyasu, for their closing theme.

No.	Title	Original DVD release
1	"The Legend Unfolds..."; Transliteration: "Shin'wa Kaigen" (Japanese: 神話開玄)	December 21, 2001
It has been three years since Miaka's journey into the "Universe of the Four Gods." She and Taka (Tamahome's reincarnation) are married, and Kisuke coaches a girls basketball team. One of the team members, Mayo Sakaki, has a crush on Taka and is depressed to find out he is married. After hearing that Miaka is three months pregnant, Mayo opens the "Universe of the Four Gods" and is sucked into it. When Mayo goes into the book, Miaka faints. At the hospital, the couple learns that their baby has vanished from Miaka's womb and she is no longer pregnant. Taka goes into the book to rescue Mayo. In the book world, ten years have passed and the world is deteriorating. He quickly finds Chichiri and Tasuki, but the three are pulled into a battle with an evil being disguised as Genbu. They are able to defeat it, though Taka gets hurt in the process. Taiitsukun arrives and explains that they must find the remaining Suzaku Seven, who have all been reborn.
2	"Desert Quest"; Transliteration: "Ryūsa Hōhaku" (Japanese: 流砂彷白)	February 25, 2002
A false Suzaku lures Mayo into the Suzaku shrine and convinces her that Taka and others are going to take Miaka's baby from her and kill her. Taka, Chichiri, and Taisuki find Chiriko, who is now a baby named Gakurei. Gakurei remembers his past life, but stays where he is to study the problem of the deteriorating world. He gives them three horses to speed up their search, but as they travel Taka grows feverish and falls from his horse. A young girl named Shōka appears and gives him some water. While they talk, a boy named Chousei also appears and the trio realize that he is Mitsukake. Chousei refuses to go with them and they have to leave to continue their search. Shōka convinces Chousei to go with the others, but after he leaves she is attacked by some mysterious birds. Taka, Chichiri, and Taisuki hear the commotion and return to the village. They find Shōka near death and Chousei possessed by a fake Byakko. After he is freed, Chousei's dormant memories and abilities as Mitsukake return. He heals Shōka and Taka's wounds.
3	"Rebirth of the Seven Stars"; Transliteration: "Shichisei Seirin" (Japanese: 七星青輪)	April 25, 2002
In a small town, the group meets a little girl named Ko Reishun, but she is captured by a demon. Taka saves her by cutting the demon in half with a holy sword, but the top half of its body flees to a nearby lake where the group is faced with a fake Seiryū. By combining their powers, they are able to defeat the fake, and realizing that Reishun is the reborn Nuriko, they ask her to go with them to the capital. Back in Konan, Mayo lies to Reizeitei and tells him that Miaka and Hotohori were horrible people. He calls her on her lies and questions if Mayo can save anyone. In her room, Mayo is contacted by best friend, Saori, who is using a medium to plead with her to return. As she looks at her hand mirror, Mayo realizes that she has no reflection, then later finds her body becoming transparent. After Yotaigo tells her the true story of how she met Hotohori, Mayo apologizes for her earlier lies. Meanwhile, Reishun takes the group to a large grave where a young boy named Shu Eian is paying his respects. They realize he is Hotohori's reincarnation and he joins them on the journey to the capital. After they set out, the fake Suzaku attacks them, but they are able to protect the boy by using a fake Eian.
4	"The Advent of Suzaku"; Transliteration: "Shuyoku Kōrin" (Japanese: 朱翼光臨)	June 25, 2002
Taiitsukun appears to warn them that the Shinzaho is in danger. Keisuke uses a cell phone charm as a medium to talk to Taka and tell him about Mayo's condition. Realizing Mayo plans to die, Taka has Chichiri teleport the group back to the palace. Mayo is attacked by the fake Suzaku, and her body begins to flicker in and out of existence. Depressed, she tries to drown herself but Taka arrives in time to save her and the Shinzaho, Miaka and Taka's baby. While they wait for Nuriko and Hotohori's memories to awaken, they learn Miaka had sent the baby with Mayo to save Konan, as she herself could not go. Before the summoning ceremony, Mayo and Miaka disappear, but as things seem hopeless they reappear and summon the real Suzaku. Suzaku uses Taka's body to destroy the imposter. Taka and Mayo return to the real world and the Universe of the Four Gods disappears. Mayo is wiser for her troubles and more appreciative of her life. Miaka also returns and wakes up in the hospital. Miaka later gives birth to a girl whom she names Hikari, hoping she will be like the stars that are always shining down on Earth. (just like from the end of the episode 9 of OVA 2 that young Hikari playing as she tells her parents that the stars are looking at them) At the National Library, the Universe of the Four Gods reappears once again on the shelf waiting for its next priestess.
