= Going Home (Lamont novel) =

2025 novel by Tom Lamont

- Author: Tom Lamont
- Publisher: Knopf Doubleday
- Publication date: 2025

Going Home is a novel by Tom Lamont. It was published by Knopf Doubleday in 2025 and is Lamont's debut novel.

== Plot summary ==
Téodor Erskine, a Jewish man from London, returns to his hometown of Enfield, which he usually tries to avoid. After his long-time unrequited crush Lia Woods commits suicide due to the pressures of being a single mother, he becomes the caretaker of her toddler son Joel. It is told between the alternating perspectives of Téodor, his ailing father Vic, his immature friend Ben, and their new rabbi Sibyl.

== Themes and structure ==
The book deals with themes of fatherhood, faith, and male bonding. The main character, Téodor, is forced to reevaluate his life after becoming Joel's guardian, and his own father Vic struggles with what it means to be a good father. After the death of Téodor's mother, Vic was unable to build a strong emotional relationship with his son, although he placed a high value on providing for him materially. Vic suffers from a degenerative disease and his declining independence are contrasted by Joel's rapid growth.

The relationship between Téodor and Ben is also a major focus of the novel, as well as Sibyl's crisis of faith.

== Reception ==
The book received praise for its exploration of masculinity and family responsibility. The novel's realistic, complex characters were also noted by critics, although some felt that elements of its plot and message felt implausible and tidy.
