= Akemi Satō (singer) =

Japanese singer and voice actress

Akemi Satō 佐藤 朱美
- Born: February 25, 1969; Furukawa, Miyagi Prefecture, Japan
- Died: March 5, 2019 (aged 50) Irvine, California, U.S.
- Genres: J-Pop, city pop
- Occupations: Singer and voice actress
- Years active: 1995–2000
- Label: Bandai Music Entertainment

Akemi Satō (佐藤 朱美, Satō Akemi; February 25, 1969 – March 5, 2019) was a Japanese female singer and occasional voice actress. Her body of work is entirely related to the Fushigi Yūgi series. She also had a small voice role (as Kaen) in the series. She died March 5, 2019.

== Discography ==
- Itōshī Hito no Tame ni (いとおしい人のために) ranked 38th at Oricon singles charts. – Opening theme for the anime series, Fushigi Yūgi.
- Futari de Arukō (ふたりで歩こう)
- Yo ga Akeru Mae ni (夜が明ける前に) – Opening theme for Fushigi Yūgi's first OVA series.
- Kaze ni Naru (風になる)
- Star – Opening theme for Fushigi Yūgi's second OVA series.

All of the above songs have also appeared on various Fushigi Yūgi soundtracks.
