= Classics: The Best of Sarah Brightman =

Compilation album

Greatest hits album by Sarah Brightman
- Released: UK: 2 October 2006
- Genre: Pop rock/classical crossover
- Producer: Frank Peterson

Sarah Brightman chronology
Love Changes Everything: The Andrew Lloyd Webber Collection, Volume 2 (2005)	Classics: The Best of Sarah Brightman (2006)	Diva: The Singles Collection (2006)

Classics: The Best of Sarah Brightman is a European-only compilation album by classical crossover soprano Sarah Brightman. An earlier version of Classics was released worldwide, except for Europe, in 2001. The cover art for both albums are the same (with the exception of the full title), but the track listings are different.

== Track listing ==
No.	Title	Length
1.	"La Wally"	4:04
2.	"Anytime, Anywhere"	3:20
3.	"Ave Maria"	3:00
4.	"Lascia ch'io pianga"	3:30
5.	"Hijo de la Luna"	4:30
6.	"What You Never Know"	3:24
7.	"En Aranjuez con tu amor"	3:51
8.	"La Luna"	4:50
9.	"It's a Beautiful Day"	3:56
10.	"Nella Fantasia"	3:39
11.	"The Music of the Night"	5:22
12.	"O mio babbino caro"	2:23
13.	"Pie Jesu"	3:56
14.	"Nessun Dorma"	3:06
15.	"Winter Light"	3:17
16.	"Time to Say Goodbye (Con te partirò)" (feat. Andrea Bocelli)	4:05
17.	"A Question of Honour, Part 2" (Radio edit version of "A Question of Honour")	5:18
Total length:		60:05

== Charts and certifications ==
=== Weekly charts ===
Chart (2006)	Peak Position
Belgian Albums (Ultratop Flanders)	13
Dutch Albums (Album Top 100)	51
German Albums (Offizielle Top 100)	98
Hungarian Albums (MAHASZ)	14
Japanese Albums (Oricon)	29
Norwegian Albums (VG-lista)	29
Swedish Albums (Sverigetopplistan)	15
Swiss Albums (Schweizer Hitparade)	66
UK Albums (Official Charts)	38

=== Certifications ===
Region	Certification	Certified units/sales
United Kingdom (BPI)	Silver	60,000^{^}
^{^} Shipments figures based on certification alone.

== VHS Release ==
Classics: The Best of Sarah Brightman VHS

Video by Sarah Brightman
- Genre: Operatic/Pop/Rock
- Producer: Frank Peterson

Classics: The Best of Sarah Brightman is a VHS of the PBS special of the same name that aired in 2002. A copy of the show was made available to the audience if they made a financial contribution to their local PBS station. The VHS is hosted and narrated by Laura Savini along with Sarah herself. The two women talk in various locations including Sarah's home in London, her studio in Germany, one of Mozart's apartments, and in several concert halls where some of Sarah's most famous performances occurred.

== Track listing ==
1. "Wishing You Were Somehow Here Again" (live) – From Sarah Brightman: In Concert from the Royal Albert Hall in London
2. "Just Show Me How To Love You" – music video with José Cura
3. "Anytime, Anywhere" – (live) – From Sarah Brightman One Night in Eden from the Sun City Super Bowl in South Africa
4. "Nessun Dorma" (live) From Sarah Brightman One Night in Eden from the Sun City Super Bowl in South Africa
5. "Figlio Perduto" (live) From Sarah Brightman La Luna: Live in Concert from the National Car Rental Center in Ft. Lauderdale
6. "Pie Jesu" (live) From Sarah Brightman La Luna: Live in Concert from the National Car Rental Center in Ft. Lauderdale
7. "La Luna" (live) From Sarah Brightman La Luna: Live in Concert from the National Car Rental Center in Ft. Lauderdale
8. "Dans La Nuit" (studio clip)
9. "La Wally/A Question of Honour" (live) From Sarah Brightman La Luna: Live in Concert from the National Car Rental Center in Ft. Lauderdale
10. "La Ci Darem La Mano" (live) -with Plácido Domingo – From The Millennium Gala Concert in Japan
11. "O Mio Babbino Caro" (live) – From Sarah Brightman: In Concert from the Royal Albert Hall in London
12. "Time to Say Goodbye" (live) -with Andrea Bocelli – From Andrea Bocelli's Statue of Liberty Concert in Jersey City
- The VHS contains bonus segments that did not air on PBS. This section includes music videos for: "Deliver Me", "Ave Maria", "Eden", "Whiter Shade of Pale", and "Winter Light".
