= List of awards and nominations received by Sarah Brightman =

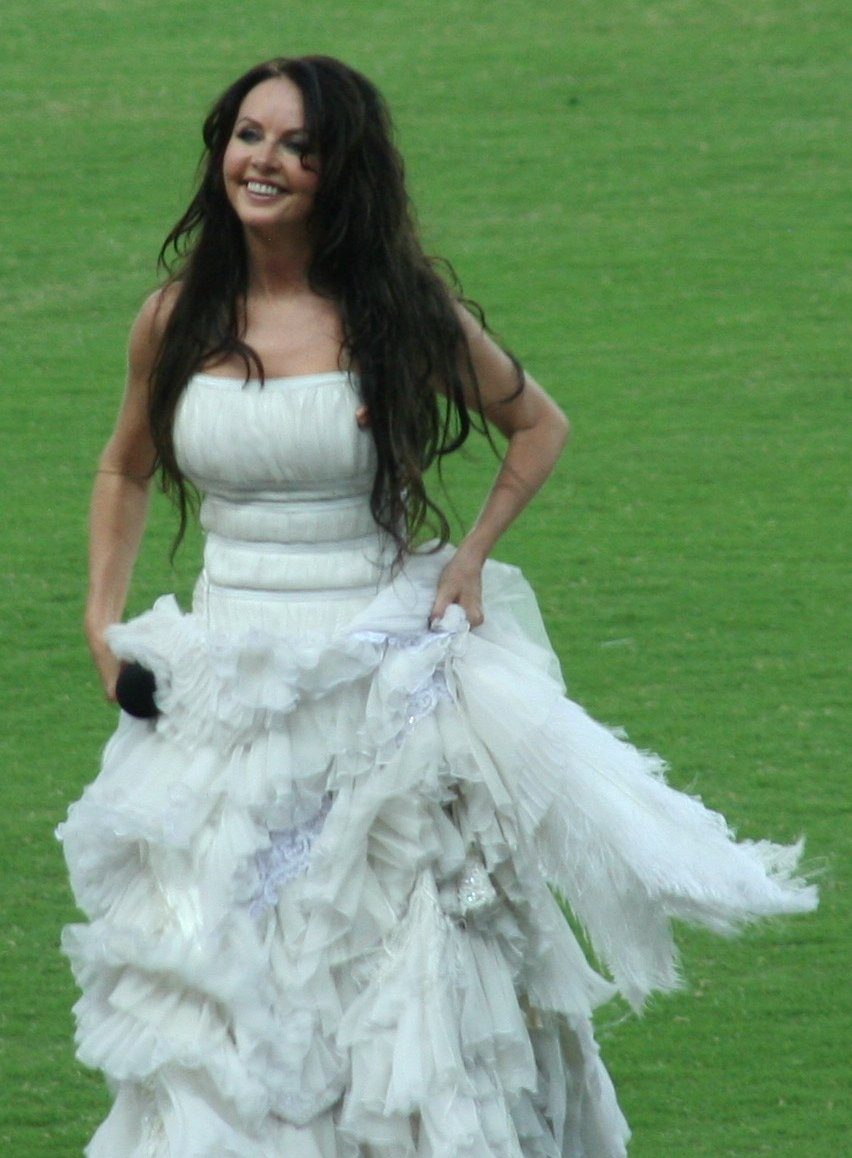
Brightman at the World Athletics Championships 2007

This page includes a list of Sarah Brightman's awards and certifications.

== Awards ==
=== 1990s ===
- 1986 Grammy Nomination, Best Classical Artist, United States
- 1996 Echo Award nomination: Best Female Artist, Germany
- 1996 RSH Gold: Best Female Artist, Germany
- 1997 Echo Award nomination: Best Female Artist
- 1998 Echo Award: Best Song Time To Say Goodbye
- 1998 Golden Lion Award: Best Live Performance, Germany
- 1998 Goldene Europa Award: Best Female Artist, Germany
- 1998 Guinness Book Entry: Germany's Best-Selling Single of All Time Time to Say Goodbye
- 1998 Grammy Taiwan: Best Selling Record Timeless
- 1998 Unesco Hand-in-Hand Award
- 1999 Czechoslovakian Grammy: Singer of the Year
- 1999 Echo Award nomination: Best Female Artist, Germany
- 1999 The Point Trophy, Dublin-Ireland: Highest-Grossing Ticket Sales One Night in Eden

=== 2000s ===
- 2000 IFPI Award, Europe: Album sales exceeding one million copies in Europe Timeless
- 2001 New Age Voice Music Award, United States: Best Vocal Album
- 2003 Media Control Award, GAS: Biggest Hit of All Time Time To Say Goodbye
- 2004 Arabian Music Award: Best Collaboration (“The War Is Over” with Kazim Al Saher)
- 2004 Arabian Music Award: Best Female Artist
- 2005 New York Film Festival: First Prize, Music Documentary (A Desert Fantasy)
- 2005 New York Film Festival: Third Prize, Music Video Time to Say Goodbye
- 2007 The 21st Japan Gold Disc Award 2007: Classic Album of the Year Diva: The Singles Collection
- 2009 The 23rd Japan Gold Disc Award 2009: Classic Album of the Year A Winter Symphony
- 2009 The 24th Japan Gold Disc Award 2010: Classic Album of the Year Amalfi - Sarah Brightman Love Songs
- 2009 Mexico's Lunas del Auditorio nomination: Best Pop-album in foreign language Symphony: Live in Vienna

=== 2010s ===
- 2010 Mexico's Lunas del Auditorio nomination: Best Pop-artist in foreign language
- 2013 6th annual Shorty Award nomination: Social Media best Singer

=== 2020s ===
- 2022 Star on the Hollywood Walk of Fame under the category of live performance

== Certifications ==
=== Americas ===
- Canada Platinum x 8, Gold x 2
- United States Platinum x 5, Gold x 6
- Mexico Platinum x 1, Gold x 6
- Brazil Gold x 7
- Chile Gold
- Venezuela Gold
- Argentina - Platinum x 6, Gold x 2
- Colombia - Gold

=== Europe ===
- Germany Platinum x 6, Gold x 4
- Denmark Platinum x 3, Gold x 2
- Norway Platinum x 3, Gold x 1
- Sweden Platinum x 3, Gold x 2
- Finland Gold x 2
- UK Gold x 2, Silver
- Ireland Platinum x 4, Gold x 2
- Portugal Platinum, Gold x 3
- Austria Platinum x 2
- Switzerland Platinum x 2
- Netherlands Platinum, Gold
- Belgium Gold
- France Gold
- Estonia Gold x 2
- Czech Republic Gold
- Hungary Gold
- Greece Gold x 2
- Turkey Gold

=== Middle East ===
- Israel Platinum x2, Gold x 2
- Arabia Gold x 2

=== Asia ===
- Japan Platinum x 3, Gold x 7
- China Platinum x 2, Gold x 4
- Hong Kong Platinum x 2, Gold x 6
- Singapore Platinum x 6, Gold x 2
- Taiwan Platinum x 12, Gold
- Malaysia Platinum
- South Korea Platinum x 4, Gold x 5

=== Africa ===
- South Africa Platinum, Gold x 3

=== Pacific ===
- Australia Platinum x 6, Gold x 4
- New Zealand Platinum x 5, Gold x 2

=== Other Awards ===
- Golden Key to the city of Chicago
- Golden Key to the city of Istanbul
