= Amalfi – Sarah Brightman Love Songs =

Compilation album by Sarah Brightman
- Released: July 8, 2009 (Japan)
- Genre: Pop/Classical Crossover
- Length: 66:09
- Label: EMI Music Japan
- Producer: Frank Peterson

Sarah Brightman chronology
Symphony: Live in Vienna (2009)	Amalfi – Sarah Brightman Love Songs (2009)	Bella Voce (2009)

Amalfi – Sarah Brightman Love Songs is a compilation album by English soprano Sarah Brightman; it was released in conjunction with the Japanese film Amalfi: Rewards of the Goddess (2009). This movie features an appearance and performance by Brightman, and is a special production marking Fuji Television's 50th anniversary. This is the first Japanese movie to be shot entirely on location in Italy. With tracks selected by Brightman, the album contains new photos/artwork and was released on July 8, 2009 exclusively in Japan. It was Japan's best-selling classical album of 2009 and won at the 24th Japan Gold Disc Awards under the category of Top Classical Album of the Year.

== Track listing ==
1. Time to Say Goodbye (solo version) – from Classics
2. La Wally – from Timeless
3. Il Mio Cuore Va – from Eden
4. O Mio Babbino Caro – from Classics
5. Anytime, Anywhere – from Eden
6. Attesa – from Symphony
7. Lascia ch'io pianga – from Eden
8. Nella Fantasia – from Eden
9. La Luna – from La Luna
10. Solo Con Te – from La Luna
11. Ave Maria – from Classics
12. Until The End Of Time – from Harem
13. Storia D’Amore – from Symphony
14. Jesu, Joy of Man's Desiring – from A Winter Symphony
15. La Califfa – from La Luna
16. Serenade – from La Luna
17. How Fair This Place – from La Luna
18. Amazing Grace – from A Winter Symphony
19. Nessun Dorma – from Eden

== Charts and certifications ==
Amalfi debuted in the top 30 in Japan. It entered the chart at #25 and landed at #24 in the second week. In the third week on chart the album peaked at #11 selling 10,488 copies.

=== Weekly charts ===
Chart (2016)	Peak position
Japanese Albums (Oricon)	11

=== Certifications ===
Region	Certification	Certified units/sales
Japan (RIAJ)	Gold	100,000^{^}
^{^} Shipments figures based on certification alone.
