= The Very Best of 1990–2000 =

Compilation album by Sarah Brightman
- Released: UK: May 28, 2001
- Genre: Classical Crossover
- Label: EastWest
- Producer: Frank Peterson

Sarah Brightman chronology
La Luna (2000)	The Very Best of 1990–2000 (2001)	Classics (2001)

The Very Best of 1990–2000 is a 2001 compilation album by English classical crossover soprano Sarah Brightman. It features songs from her albums produced by Frank Peterson. Also notable is the Richard Marx collaboration "The Last Words You Said" makes its debut in the UK, as it was previously available only on the U.S. version of Eden.

== Track listing ==
No.	Title	Length
1.	"A Question of Honour, Part 2" (Radio edit version of "A Question of Honour")	5:20
2.	"Heaven Is Here"	4:06
3.	"Who Wants to Live Forever"	3:57
4.	"Time to Say Goodbye (Con te partirò)" (feat. Andrea Bocelli)	4:07
5.	"Tú Quieres Volver" (Radio Remix)	3:50
6.	"Just Show Me How to Love You" (feat. José Cura)	4:00
7.	"Eden"	4:02
8.	"Nella Fantasia"	3:41
9.	"Deliver Me"	4:02
10.	"Only an Ocean Away"	4:57
11.	"Scarborough Fair"	4:13
12.	"A Whiter Shade of Pale" (Radio Edit)	3:13
13.	"First of May" (Studio Version)	2:57
14.	"Captain Nemo" (Live)	3:30
15.	"La Mer" (Live)	3:01
16.	"The Last Words You Said" (feat. Richard Marx)	4:10
Total length:		63:13

== Charts and certifications ==
=== Weekly charts ===
Chart (2001)	Peak position
Austrian Albums (Ö3 Austria)	48
Danish Albums (Hitlisten)	10
Dutch Albums (Album Top 100)	8
Finnish Albums (Suomen virallinen lista)	18
German Albums (Offizielle Top 100)	64
Hungarian Albums (MAHASZ)	25
Irish Albums (IRMA)	23
Portuguese Albums (AFP)	30
Swedish Albums (Sverigetopplistan)	9

=== Year-end charts ===
Chart (2001)	Position
Dutch Albums (Album Top 100)	87
Swedish Albums (Sverigetopplistan)	42

=== Certifications ===
Region	Certification	Certified units/sales
Sweden (GLF)	Gold	40,000^{^}
Netherlands (NVPI)	Platinum	80,000^{^}
^{^} Shipments figures based on certification alone.
