= Symphony: Live in Vienna =

2008 live video album

- Produced by: Frank Peterson
- Starring: Sarah Brightman
- Release date: 2008 (U.S.)
- Running time: 75 minutes

Symphony: Live in Vienna is a live concert by Sarah Brightman, inspired by her Symphony album. It was originally only available as a premium for a donation to the Public Broadcasting Service (PBS) in the United States. A lower-level donation would yield a free copy of the DVD, and a higher-level donation would yield a set containing both the DVD and a companion CD.

The 75-minute concert was recorded on 16 January 2008 at Stephansdom (St. Stephen's) Cathedral in Vienna, Austria. The audience consisted of a small group of invited guests and members of Sarah Brightman's official website's fan area, to whom free tickets were made available.

Recorded in 5.1 Surround Sound, the DVD has over 40 minutes of special features. They include a photo gallery, two separate interviews with Sarah concerning the production and the songs of Symphony, and an interview with Father Anthony Faber and historian Elisabeth Lloyd-Davis focusing on the location of the concert.

== Track listing ==
1. "Pie Jesu"
2. "Fleurs du Mal"
3. "Symphony"
4. "Sanvean"
5. "Canto della Terra" (feat. Alessandro Safina)
6. "Sarai Qui" (feat. Alessandro Safina)
7. "Attesa"
8. "I Will Be with You" (feat. Chris Thompson)
9. "Storia d'Amore"
10. "Pasión" (feat. Fernando Lima)
11. "Running"
12. "Let It Rain"
13. "Phantom of the Opera" (feat. Chris Thompson)
14. "Time to Say Goodbye"
15. "Ave Maria"

== Album ==
Symphony: Live in Vienna

Live album by Sarah Brightman
- Released: Asia & Europe March 2009
- Genre: Pop/Rock/Classical Crossover
- Length: 73:54
- Producer: Frank Peterson

Sarah Brightman chronology
A Winter Symphony (2008)	Symphony: Live in Vienna (2009)	Amalfi – Sarah Brightman Love Songs (2009)

The CD and the CD/DVD package were released on 10 March 2009. The DVD includes a picture gallery with pictures from the concert, two interviews with Brightman, as well as an interview about the cathedral with Father Anthony Faber and historian Elisabeth Lloyd-Jones. The CD in the CD/DVD package includes a bonus studio recording of Brightman performing "Vide Cor Meum" by Patrick Cassidy.

== Track listing ==
No.	Title	Length
1.	"Pie Jesu"	3:56
2.	"Fleurs du Mal"	4:46
3.	"Symphony"	5:00
4.	"Sanvean"	4:03
5.	"Canto della Terra" (feat. Alessandro Safina)	4:21
6.	"Sarai Qui" (feat. Alessandro Safina)	4:10
7.	"Attesa"	4:41
8.	"I Will Be with You" (feat. Chris Thompson)	4:49
9.	"Storia d'Amore"	4:20
10.	"Pasión" (feat. Fernando Lima)	5:33
11.	"Running"	6:20
12.	"Let It Rain"	4:36
13.	"Phantom of the Opera" (feat. Chris Thompson)	4:36
14.	"Time to Say Goodbye"	4:35
15.	"Ave Maria"	3:34
16.	"Vide Cor Meum" (Bonus track only available on the CD/DVD edition)	4:26
Total length:		73:54

== Charts and certifications ==
=== Charts ===
Chart (2009)	Peak position
Australian DVD(ARIA Charts)	20
Greek International Chart	19
Mexico Albums Chart	10
US Billboard 200	191
US Billboard Top Classical Crossover Albums	3

=== Certifications ===
Live album

Region	Certification	Certified units/sales
Mexico (AMPROFON)	Gold	40,000^{^}
^{^} Shipments figures based on certification alone.

Live DVD recording

Region	Certification	Certified units/sales
Mexico (AMPROFON)	Gold	10,000^{^}
^{^} Shipments figures based on certification alone.
