= Diva: The Singles Collection =

2006 compilation album by Sarah Brightman

Compilation album by Sarah Brightman
- Released: US: 3 October 2006
- Genre: Classical crossover
- Length: 66:28
- Label: Angel Records
- Producer: Frank Peterson

Sarah Brightman chronology
Love Changes Everything (2005)	Diva: The Singles Collection (2006)	Symphony (2008)

Diva: The Singles Collection is a 2006 compilation album by Sarah Brightman. Alongside this album, Brightman released a DVD collection of her music videos on 3 October 2006 under the title of Diva: The Video Collection. The album marked the first time Brightman released a greatest hits album in the United States. It reached No. 1 on the Billboard Classical Crossover chart. In Japan, the album debuted and peaked at No. 2 with 77,000 copies sold on its first week of release, and became Japan's best-selling classical album of 2007. Subsequently, it was Japan's fifteenth best-selling international album of the 2000s decade. Diva was also the best-selling western album in South Korea in 2010, as it topped the international charts for 26 non-consecutive weeks. As of December 2013, it has been certified Quintuple Platinum in the country.

== Track listing ==
No.	Title	Writer(s)	Length
1.	"The Phantom of the Opera" (with Steve Harley)	Mike Batt; Charles Hart; Andrew Lloyd Webber; Richard Stilgoe	4:39
2.	"The Music of the Night"	Charles Hart; Andrew Lloyd Webber; Richard Stilgoe	5:25
3.	"Pie Jesu" (with Paul Miles-Kingston)	Andrew Lloyd Webber	3:58
4.	"Who Wants to Live Forever"	Brian May	3:56
5.	"Tu Quieres Volver"	Tonino Baliardo; Maurice Baliardo; Jacques Baliardo; Jahloul Bouchikhi; Nicolas Reyes; André Reyes; Paul Reyes	3:49
6.	"Just Show Me How to Love You" (with José Cura)	Dario Baldan Bembo	4:00
7.	"Deliver Me"	Helena Marsh; Jon Marsh	4:01
8.	"Nella Fantasia"	Ennio Morricone	3:40
9.	"Scarborough Fair"	Frank Peterson; Paul Simon	4:12
10.	"A Whiter Shade of Pale"	Gary Brooker; Keith Reid	3:39
11.	"It's a Beautiful Day"	Christopher von Deylen; Frank Peterson	3:58
12.	"What You Never Know"	Stephan Moccio	3:25
13.	"A Question of Honour"	Frank Peterson	5:18
14.	"Time to Say Goodbye (Con te partirò)" (with Andrea Bocelli)	Frank Peterson, Lucio Quarantotto, Francesco Sartori	4:06
Total length:			58:06

Japanese bonus tracks
No.	Title	Writer(s)	Length
1.	"Il Mio Cuore Va"	James Horner; Will Jennings; Italian lyrics translated by Michelangelo La Bionda and Carmelo La Bionda	4:27
2.	"Sarahbande"	George Frideric Handel; Frank Peterson; Michael Soltau	3:49
Total length:			1:06:22

== Personnel ==
- Mike Batt – Lyricist, producer
- Andrea Bocelli – Vocals
- Sarah Brightman – Vocals, lyricist, producer, executive producer, concept
- Gary Brooker – Lyricist
- A. Cassella – Lyricist
- Alex Christensen – Producer
- José Cura – Vocals
- Chiara Ferrau – Lyricist, photography
- Simon Fowler – Photography
- Esther Haase – Photography
- Charles Hart – Lyricist
- Laisa – Lyricist
- Andrew Lloyd Webber – Lyricist, producer
- Brian May – Lyricist
- Paul Miles-Kingston – Choir master
- Stephan Moccio – Lyricist
- Ennio Morricone – Lyricist
- David R. Murray – Producer
- Frank Peterson – Lyricist, producer, executive producer, concept
- Quarantotto – Lyricist
- Keith Reid – Lyricist
- A. Gilberto Reyes – Lyricist
- Sartori – Lyricist
- Richard Stilgoe – Lyricist
- Christopher Von Deylen – Lyricist
- Ellen Von Unwerth – Photography

== Charts and certifications ==
=== Weekly charts ===
Chart	Peak Position
Japan Oricon Top Albums	2
New Zealand Albums (RMNZ)	10
South Korean Albums (Gaon)	51
US Billboard 200	100
US Top Classical Albums (Billboard)	1

=== Sales and certifications ===
Region	Certification	Certified units/sales
Argentina (CAPIF)	2× Platinum	80,000^{^}
Japan (RIAJ)	2× Platinum	600,000
New Zealand (RMNZ)	Platinum	15,000^{^}
South Korea	—	35,911
^{^} Shipments figures based on certification alone.
