= Nightingale (children's opera) =

1982 children's opera by Charles Strouse

- A New Musical
- Original London cast recording
- Music: Charles Strouse
- Lyrics: Charles Strouse
- Book: Charles Strouse
- Basis: Hans Christian Andersen' story "The Nightingale"
- Productions: 1982 Off West End

Nightingale: A New Musical is a children's opera in one act, with book, music and lyrics by Charles Strouse. It is based on Hans Christian Andersen's 1843 fairy tale, "The Nightingale", and tells the story of a Chinese emperor who learns, nearly too late, that wealth cannot buy happiness.

== History ==
The work premiered in the US as a fully staged production at the First All Children's Theatre, 37 West 65th Street in New York, in May 1982, directed and staged by Meridee Stein, along with associate director and choreographer Linda Reiff, with sets by Oliver Smith, costumes by Christine Andrews, and lighting by Victor En Yu Tan. The music director was Wayne Green; the vocal director was Vicky Blumenthal; the stage manager was Janine Trevens. The orchestrations for the production were arranged by Robby Merkin.

The group then gave a preview of the work in New York in March 1983 before the North American premiere at "The Barns" at Wolf Trap, Virginia, in April 1983.

In the UK, it was first produced at the Buxton Festival and then in London at the Lyric Hammersmith beginning on 18 December 1982, with a cast including Sarah Brightman as the title character, Nightingale. Since then, the show has been performed numerous times throughout the world.

A cast album was released in 1985 with the London cast.

== Musical numbers ==
- Prologue – Orchestra
- Perfect Harmony – Company
- Why Am I So Happy? – The Maid
- Take Us To the Forest – Company
- Who Are These People – Nightingale
- Never Speak Directly to an Emperor – Palace Guards
- Nightingale – Company
- The Emperor is a Man – The Maid
- I Was Lost – Emperor / Nightingale
- Charming – Two Peacocks
- A Singer Must Be Free – Nightingale
- The Mechanical Bird – The Company / Mechanical Bird
- Please Don't Make Me Hear That Song Again – Company / Mechanical Bird
- Rivers Cannot Flow Upwards – The Maid, Nightingale
- Death Duet – Death, Emperor, Maid and Nightingale
- We Are China – Company

== Synopsis ==
=== Act 1 ===
In China, an Emperor is told of "the Nightingale", a bird that is so beautiful it makes even the fisherman stop just to hear her song ("How Beautiful!"). The Emperor tells his Courtiers to find the Nightingale within the day, the Courtiers ask the non-royal Courtiers to find the Nightingale ("Have You Seen The Nightingale?"). The Chef finds a Little Girl (that is unnamed) that knows the Nightingale. The Courtiers tell the Emperor, and the Emperor makes it the Little Girl's mission to find the Nightingale and bring it to him. The Little Girl takes the Courtiers to the forest ("Follow Me"). The Courtiers mock the Nightingale upon seeing it, but when they hear her song, they bring her to the Emperor ("Nightingale?"). The Citizens of China hear the Nightingale and they make it a nation treasure ("Festival Medley").

=== Act 2 ===
The Narrators tell the audience how things have been throughout the last few years ("Entr'acte" / "Beautiful Underscore"). The Emperor gets a present from Japan that is a Mechanical Bird. The Courtiers prefer The Mechanical Bird over the real one, and the Little Girl lets it escape. The Emperor banishes the bird, and the Mechanical Bird replaces the real one ("The Mechanical Bird"). The Emperor becomes ill because the Mechanical Bird breaks down, and is only able to sing every year. When the Emperor is close to dying, the Little Girl gifts the Emperor something ("Elegy"). The Emperor opens the gift, finding the real Nightingale. The Nightingale's song helps the Emperor live ("Finale"). The Citizens celebrate the Nightingale ("How Beautiful (Reprise)").

== New York City full-stage production cast ==
- Emperor (bass-baritone) – John Schuck
- Nightingale (soprano) – Marina Arakelian
- Maid (soprano or mezzo-soprano) – Lynne Kolber
- Mechanical Bird – Annette Farrington
- Emperor's Aide 1 - Robert De Dea
- Emperor's Aide 2 - Ben Schwartz
- Minister, Sculptor, Banker, animals, etc.:
- Ellen Barnett, Debbie Bluestone, Dena Bluestone, Lada Boder, Kim Brown, John Carrie, Debra Dehass, Doreen DeLise, Liz Devivo, Gerard Dure, Carrie Englander, Michael Feigin, Jofka Foreman, Kimberly Gambino, Karl Gaskin, Masi Glushanok, Jenny Golden, Samaria Graham, Helena Green, Kerrie Gross, Michelle League, Kathleen Manousos, Edie Ogando, Carl Payne, Victoria Platt, Wendy Rockman, Lianne Sugarman, Cathy Trien, Annette Verdolino, Ian Wagreich, Steven Ward, and Fiona Williams

== London recording cast ==
- Narrator (baritone) – Andrew Shore
- Emperor (bass-baritone) – Gordon Sandison
- Nightingale (soprano) – Sarah Brightman
- Maid (soprano or mezzo-soprano) – Susannah Fellows
- Peacock #1 – Dinah Harris
- Peacock #2 (mezzo-soprano) – Jill Pert
- Death – Michael Heath
- Mechanical Bird – Carole Brooke
- Minister, Sculptor, Banker, animals, etc.
