= Requiem (Lloyd Webber) =

1985 requiem mass by Andrew Lloyd Webber

- by Andrew Lloyd Webber
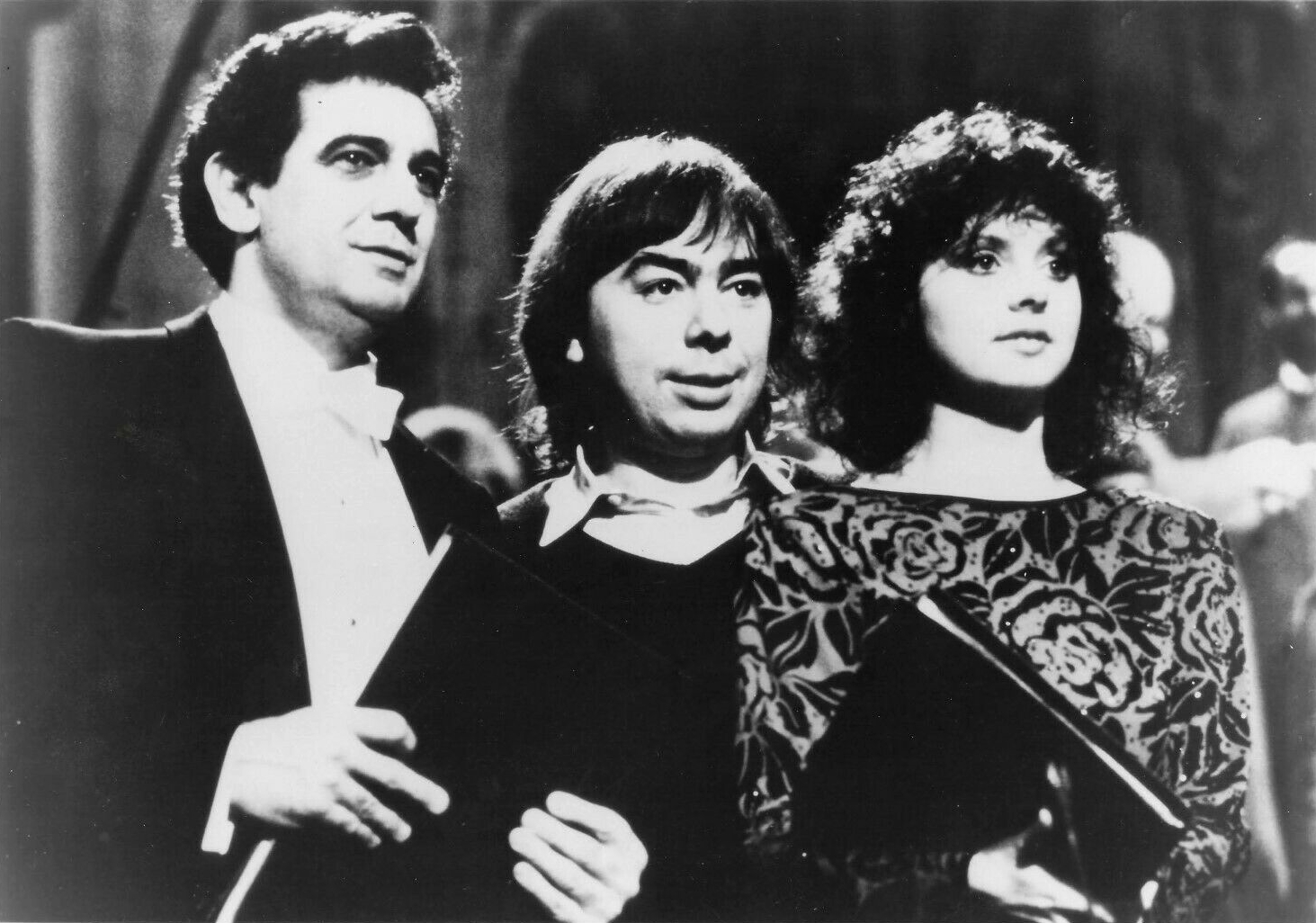
- Plácido Domingo, Andrew Lloyd Webber, and Sarah Brightman at the world premiere of Lloyd Webber's Requiem
- Text: Requiem
- Language: Latin
- Dedication: memory of William Lloyd Webber
- Performed: 24 February 1985; 41 years ago
- Scoring: tenor; soprano; treble; choir; orchestra

Andrew Lloyd Webber's Requiem is a requiem mass, which premiered in 1985. It was written in memory of the composer's father, William Lloyd Webber, who died in 1982.

== History and reception ==
It was a new venture for Lloyd Webber, the composer of numerous musicals, to create a piece of traditional classical music. The music mixes Lloyd Webber's melodic and pop-oriented style with more complex, sophisticated, and at times even austere forms.

An initial draft of Requiem was heard during the 1984 Sydmonton Festival, after which Lloyd Webber spent an additional half-year polishing the work. The premiere took place on 24 February 1985 in St. Thomas Church, New York; the conductor was Lorin Maazel, and the three soloists were Plácido Domingo, Sarah Brightman (Lloyd Webber's wife at the time), and Paul Miles-Kingston.

Requiem won the 1986 Grammy Award for Best Classical Contemporary Composition. The most popular segment of Requiem has been the Pie Jesu, which became a hit single and has been recorded by numerous artists.

On 20 July 2013, Lorin Maazel revisited Requiem at the Castleton Festival. Featured performers were soprano Joyce El-Khoury, tenor Tyler Nelson, and treble Tommy Richman.

Since then the work has been rarely performed live. It was performed in Tallinn, Estonia 18 April 2024 by Estonian National Symphony Orchestra conducted by Kaspar Mänd, the soloists were Maria Listra (soprano), Peeter Veltman and Tobias Tark (boy sopranos) and Heldur Harry Põlda (tenor).

== Pie Jesu ==
The best-known part of Lloyd Webber's Requiem, the "Pie Jesu" segment, combines the traditional Pie Jesu text with that of the Agnus Dei from later in the standard Requiem Mass. It was originally performed by Sarah Brightman, who premiered the selection in 1985 in a duet with boy soprano Paul Miles-Kingston; a music video of their duet was created as well. The performance by Brightman and Miles-Kingston was a certified Silver hit in the UK in 1985. Brightman later rerecorded the track for her Classics album in 2001.

Pie Jesu has since been recorded frequently outside of the parent Requiem. Notable solo artists include Sarah Brightman, Hayley Westenra, Sissel Kyrkjebø, Marie Osmond, Anna Netrebko, Amira Willighagen, Michelle Bass, Aled Jones and Malakai Bayoh. Charlotte Church sang it on her debut album, Voice of an Angel (1998). Angelis, a children's choir, sang it on their eponymous debut album Angelis (2006). Moe Koffman recorded the Pie Jesu on his re-issued album Music for the Night (1991) with Doug Riley.

The Pie Jesu was voted number 91 in the Classic 100 Twentieth Century countdown in 2011 on the Australian ABC Classic FM radio station.

== Scoring and structure ==
The work is scored for chorus, three soloists (tenor, soprano, treble) and a large orchestra that includes organ, drum kit, and synthesizer.

=== Instrumentation ===
- Voices: tenor, soprano, and treble soloists, and SATB choir (performed with boy sopranos and altos at the premiere)
- Woodwinds: 2 flutes (1st doubling alto flute, 2nd doubling piccolo and alto flute), 2 oboes (1st doubling oboe d'amore, 2nd doubling English horn), 2 clarinets (1st doubling E-flat clarinet, 2nd doubling bass clarinet), 2 saxophones (1st doubling soprano and tenor saxophones and alto flute, 2nd doubling alto and baritone saxophones and clarinet), 2 bassoons, and contrabassoon
- Brass: 4 horns, 3 trumpets, and 4 trombones
- Percussion: timpani & 4 percussionists playing side drum, bass drum, cymbals, triangle, small, medium, large and deep suspended cymbals, tambourine, deep military side drum, small ratchet rattle, glockenspiel, xylophone, gong, large gong, small bell, bells, chimes, bell tree, wood block, congas, maracas, marimba, high rototom, drum kit
- Keyboards: piano (doubling celesta), synthesizer, and organ
- Strings: harp, violas, violoncellos, and double basses

=== Structure ===
As is usual, Lloyd Webber did not set the Gradual and Tract texts of the Mass. He divides the Sanctus between two movements, including the Hosanna part with the Benedictus. He does not set the Agnus Dei separately, but rather combined the text of Pie Jesu, a motet derived from the final couplet of the usual Dies irae, with that of the Agnus Dei, commonly heard later in the standard Requiem Mass. He includes a text from the burial service, Libera me.

- Introit – Kyrie
- Sequence:
  - Dies irae
  - Recordare
  - Ingemisco
- Offertory – Sanctus: Sanctus
- Sanctus: Hosanna – Benedictus
- Pie Jesu
- Communion – Libera me
