= La Luna: Live in Concert =

2001 film by Frank Peterson, Bruce Gowers

- Directed by: Bruce Gowers; Frank Peterson
- Produced by: Sarah Brightman; Frank Peterson; John Scher; Sandra Restrepo
- Starring: Sarah Brightman
- Distributed by: Angel
- Release date: 13 March 2001
- Running time: 89 minutes

La Luna: Live in Concert is a live concert recording by Sarah Brightman, inspired by her La Luna album. The performance in Sunrise, Florida was recorded and filmed on 4 October 2000 and has been released on DVD and VHS in spring 2001. Brightman performs her 1997 hit "There for Me" with singer Josh Groban. Special features included are the music video for "A Whiter Shade of Pale", a multipart documentary covering the making of the La Luna album and tour, a behind-the-scenes tour documentary, an interview, and an interactive tour map.

== Track listing ==
1. "La Lune"
2. "Winter in July"
3. "Scarborough Fair"
4. "Who Wants to Live Forever"
5. "Hijo de la Luna"
6. "La Luna Interlude I"
7. "Figlio Perduto"
8. "La Luna"
9. "La Califfa"
10. "Pie Jesu"
11. "La Luna Interlude II"
12. "Nessun Dorma"
13. "Siren"
14. "Deliver Me"
15. "He Doesn't See Me"
16. "La Luna Interlude III"
17. "A Whiter Shade of Pale"
18. "There for Me" (with Josh Groban)
19. "Twisted Every Way"
20. "Phantom of the Opera Suite"
21. "Little Lotte"
22. "Wishing You Were Somehow Here Again"
23. "The Music of the Night"
24. "A Question of Honour"
25. "Moon River"
26. "Time to Say Goodbye"

== Certifications ==
| Region | Certification | Certified units/sales |
|---|---|---|
| Mexico (AMPROFON) | Gold | 10,000^{^} |
| United States (RIAA) | Gold | 50,000^{^} |
^{^} Shipments figures based on certification alone.
