= One Night in Eden =

- Directed by: David Mallet; Frank Peterson
- Produced by: Sarah Brightman; Frank Peterson
- Starring: Sarah Brightman
- Distributed by: Angel
- Release date: 5 October 1999
- Running time: 92 minutes

One Night in Eden is a live concert recording by Sarah Brightman, inspired by her Eden album. The premiere concert held in Johannesburg, South Africa was recorded in 1999 and has been released on DVD and VHS.

== Track listing ==
1. "Introduction"
2. "Baïlèro"
3. "In Paradisum"
4. "Eden"
5. "So Many Things"
6. "Who Wants to Live Forever"
7. "Anytime, Anywhere"
8. "Lascia Ch'io Pianga"
9. "Nella Fantasia"
10. "Nessun Dorma"
11. "Dive/Captain Nemo"
12. "La Mer"
13. "Il Mio Cuore Va"
14. "Only An Ocean Away"
15. "First of May"
16. "Phantom Overture & Little Lotte"
17. "Wishing You Were Somehow Here Again"
18. "Music of the Night"
19. "Deliver Me"
20. "Time to Say Goodbye"

== Certifications ==
Region	Certification	Certified units/sales
Argentina (CAPIF)	Platinum	8,000^{^}
United States (RIAA)	Gold	50,000^{^}
^{^} Shipments figures based on certification alone.
