= Classics (Sarah Brightman album) =

2001 compilation album by Sarah Brightman

Compilation album by Sarah Brightman
- Released: 20 November 2001
- Genre: Classical Crossover
- Length: 54:24
- Label: Angel
- Producer: Frank Peterson

Sarah Brightman chronology
| The Very Best of 1990–2000 (2001) | Classics (2001) | Encore (2002) |

Classics is a compilation album by classical crossover soprano Sarah Brightman. It collects previously released material, such as "Pie Jesu", from Andrew Lloyd Webber's Requiem; "Figlio Perduto", "Lascia ch'io pianga" and "La Luna" from Brightman's previous studio albums, and new recordings of some her classical vocal performances, including "Ave Maria", "Dans La Nuit", "Alhambra" and a solo version of the 1997' hit "Time to Say Goodbye".

Entertainment Weekly, although calling Brightman a "stronger song stylist than a singer", gave the album a grade of B−. Classics was re-released in Europe in 2006, with the same cover art but a different track listing, as Classics: The Best of Sarah Brightman.

== Track listing ==
| No. | Title | Music | Length |
|---|---|---|---|
| 1. | "Ave Maria" | Schubert ("Ellens dritter Gesang", Op. 52, No. 6) | 3:00 |
| 2. | "La Wally" | Catalani (La Wally: "Ebben? Ne andrò lontana") | 4:03 |
| 3. | "Winter Light" | Eric Kaz/Linda Ronstadt/Zbigniew Antoni Preisner | 3:17 |
| 4. | "Anytime, Anywhere" | Albinoni ("Adagio in G minor") | 3:19 |
| 5. | "Alhambra" | Tárrega ("Recuerdos de la Alhambra") | 4:01 |
| 6. | "Lascia ch'io pianga" | Handel (Rinaldo, HWV 7) | 3:30 |
| 7. | "Dans la Nuit" | Chopin ("Étude in E, Op. 10/3 CT16") | 2:45 |
| 8. | "Serenade/How Fair This Place" | Rachmaninov ("How Fair This Spot", Op. 21/7) | 3:25 |
| 9. | "O mio babbino caro" | Puccini (Gianni Schicchi) | 2:22 |
| 10. | "La Luna" | Dvořák (Rusalka, Op. 114 B 203) | 4:59 |
| 11. | "Pie Jesu" | Andrew Lloyd Webber (Requiem) | 3:44 |
| 12. | "Figlio Perduto" | Beethoven ("Symphony No. 7, Op. 92) | 4:39 |
| 13. | "Nessun dorma" | Puccini (Turandot) | 3:52 |
| 14. | "Bailero" | Canteloube | 3:13 |
| 15. | "Time to Say Goodbye (Con te partirò)" (Solo Version) | Francesco Sartori/Lucio Quarantotto | 4:08 |
| Total length: | | | 54:24 |

Japan Edition
| No. | Title | Music | Length |
|---|---|---|---|
| 16. | "Regnava nel silenzio" (Live) | Donizetti (Lucia di Lammermoor) | 9:06 |
| Total length: | | | 63:30 |

== Singles ==
- "Winter Light" (Canadian promo single) (2001)
- "Ave Maria" (Japanese promo single) (2001)

== Charts and certifications ==
=== Weekly charts ===
Weekly chart performance for Classics by Sarah Brightman
| Chart (2001–02) | Peak position |
|---|---|
| Australian Albums (ARIA) | 13 |
| Canadian Albums (Billboard) | 9 |
| New Zealand Albums (RMNZ) | 13 |
| US Billboard 200 | 66 |
| US Top Classical Albums (Billboard) | 2 |

=== Year-end charts ===
2001 year-end chart performance for Classics by Sarah Brightman
| Chart (2001) | Peak position |
|---|---|
| Canadian Albums (Nielsen SoundScan) | 129 |

2002 year-end chart performance for Classics by Sarah Brightman
| Chart (2002) | Position |
|---|---|
| Canadian Albums (Nielsen SoundScan) | 193 |

=== Certifications ===
| Region | Certification | Certified units/sales |
|---|---|---|
| Argentina (CAPIF) | Gold | 20,000^{^} |
| Australia (ARIA) | Platinum | 70,000^{^} |
| Canada (Music Canada) | Platinum | 100,000^{^} |
| South Korea | — | 54,018 |
| United States (RIAA) | Gold | 500,000^{^} |
^{^} Shipments figures based on certification alone.
