= La Luna (Sarah Brightman album) =

Studio album by Sarah Brightman
- Released: 25 April 2000
- Recorded: 1999–2000
- Studio: Angel Recording Studios (London, England); Smecky Studios (Prague, Czech Republic); Centro Arteria (Milan, Italy); Nemo Studios (Hamburg, Germany); Timps Studios (Maidenhead, England)
- Genre: Classical crossover
- Length: 60:59 (USA)
- Label: East West (Europe); Angel Records (USA)
- Producer: Frank Peterson

Sarah Brightman chronology
| Eden (1998) | La Luna (2000) | The Very Best of 1990–2000 (2001) |

Professional ratings
Review scores
| Source | Rating |
|---|---|
| Allmusic | 3/5 stars |

La Luna (Italian and Spanish for "the Moon") is the seventh album recorded by English soprano Sarah Brightman in 2000. It was released under license by Nemo Studios to Angel Records. The album combines pieces written by classical and modern composers. It is the 17th top-selling classical album of the 2000s in the US, according to Nielsen SoundScan, and is Brightman's second highest seller in the country after her 1997 release Timeless/Time to Say Goodbye. Aside from the US, the album experienced its strongest sales in Asia, where it received a quintuple platinum certification in Taiwan and earned Brightman's first Gold award in Japan.

== Album information ==
The classical pieces are "How Fair This Place" ("Здесь хорошо") by Rachmaninov; "Figlio Perduto" is based on the second movement "Allegretto" of Ludwig van Beethoven's Symphony No. 7; "Solo Con Te" is based on Siegfried Ochs' (attributed to Handel) Dank sei dir, Herr; "La Luna" is an adapted Italian version of the aria "Song to the Moon" from Dvořák's opera Rusalka. With La Luna, Brightman combined elements of classical singing with her newer style of pop music. Some of the covers included on this album are: "Hijo de la Luna" by Mecano, "Winter in July" by Bomb the Bass, "Gloomy Sunday" with lyrics by Sam M. Lewis, "This Love" by Craig Armstrong, and "He Doesn't See Me" (originally titled Elle ne me voit pas) by Jean-Jacques Goldman. "La Califfa", composed by Ennio Morricone, is the title track of the 1970 Italian film with the same name. The underlying concept of the album is the moon.

== Track listing ==
=== Europe ===
This original European track listing is now out of print. All pressings now use the USA track listing, along with its versions of "This Love", "Here with Me", and "La Luna". It also replaces "How Fair This Spot" and "She Doesn't See Him" with the lyrically different "How Fair This Place" and "He Doesn't See Me". "La Luna" is performed in full soprano here compared to the more contemporary USA version and "First of May" is removed all together from later releases.

| No. | Title | Length |
|---|---|---|
| 1. | "This Love" | 6:19 |
| 2. | "Scarborough Fair" | 4:12 |
| 3. | "Figlio Perduto" | 4:36 |
| 4. | "La Califfa" | 3:05 |
| 5. | "Here with Me" | 5:12 |
| 6. | "Serenade" | 0:51 |
| 7. | "Здесь Xорошо" (How Fair This Place a.k.a. How Fair This Spot) | 2:09 |
| 8. | "Hijo de la Luna" | 4:29 |
| 9. | "She Doesn't See Him" | 4:28 |
| 10. | "Solo Con Te" | 3:05 |
| 11. | "Gloomy Sunday" | 3:47 |
| 12. | "La Luna" | 5:01 |
| 13. | "First of May" (Live – Encore Track) | 3:03 |
| Total length: | | 50:21 |

=== United States ===
La Luna was changed considerably for its US release. Song additions include "La Lune", "Winter in July", and Brightman's covers of the Procol Harum classic "A Whiter Shade of Pale" and Henry Mancini's "Moon River". Song changes include replacing the European release's versions of "How Fair This Spot" and "She Doesn't See Him" with the lyrically different "How Fair This Place" and "He Doesn't See Me", along with an extended version of "Serenade" and a more contemporary "La Luna". EMI later used La Luna's US version for their SACD 5.1 release of the album.

| No. | Title | Length |
|---|---|---|
| 1. | "La Lune" | 2:53 |
| 2. | "Winter in July" | 4:32 |
| 3. | "Scarborough Fair" | 4:11 |
| 4. | "Figlio Perduto" | 4:37 |
| 5. | "A Whiter Shade of Pale" | 3:38 |
| 6. | "He Doesn't See Me" | 4:28 |
| 7. | "Serenade" | 1:16 |
| 8. | "Здесь Хорошо" (How Fair This Place a.k.a. How Fair This Spot) | 2:10 |
| 9. | "Hijo de la Luna" | 4:27 |
| 10. | "Here with Me" | 5:24 |
| 11. | "La Califfa" | 2:47 |
| 12. | "This Love" | 6:11 |
| 13. | "Solo Con Te" | 3:06 |
| 14. | "Gloomy Sunday" | 3:47 |
| 15. | "La Luna" (Features hidden track "Moon River" 20 seconds after "La Luna" at the 5:16 mark.) | 7:18 |
| Total length: | | 60:57 |

Barnes & Noble Edition
| No. | Title | Length |
|---|---|---|
| 16. | "Heaven Is Here" (Features hidden track "Moon River" after "Heaven Is Here" instead of "La Luna".) | 6:29 |
| Total length: | | 60:05 |

== Singles ==
"Scarborough Fair" was released as the album's lead single in January 2000. It became the biggest hit of Brightman's career in Asia and was a chart topper in China and Taiwan, propelling the sales of La Luna throughout the continent. Brightman brought the song renewed popularity in eastern markets through her successful adaptation.

"A Whiter Shade of Pale" was released as the album's third single on early 2001. The single debuted at number thirty eight on the Japanese Singles Chart, and due to its massive airplay in the country, the song reached the top of the International Singles Chart, staying there for nineteen weeks. It is the tenth single with most cumulative weeks at the No. 1 spot in the history of this chart. The song was certified twice Gold by the Recording Industry Association of Japan. The first time, as a CD single, denoting shipments of over 50,000 copies, and the second time, in 2011, as a digital single, denoting sales of 100,000 copies. In the United States, the song was Brightman's first entry into the Billboard's top Dance/Club Play Songs chart.

The second and fourth singles from the album, "La Luna" (2000) and "Here with Me" (2001) were released in Brazil and Europe respectively in a limited number of pressings.

== Charts ==
=== Weekly charts ===
Weekly chart performance for La Luna
| Chart (2000) | Peak position |
|---|---|
| Australian Albums (ARIA) | 94 |
| Austrian Albums (Ö3 Austria) | 9 |
| Belgian Albums (Ultratop Flanders) | 38 |
| Canada Top Albums/CDs (RPM) | 5 |
| Danish Albums (Hitlisten) | 10 |
| Dutch Albums (Album Top 100) | 17 |
| Finnish Albums (Suomen virallinen lista) | 7 |
| German Albums (Offizielle Top 100) | 17 |
| Mexican Albums (Top 100 Mexico) | 1 |
| New Zealand Albums (RMNZ) | 35 |
| Norwegian Albums (VG-lista) | 8 |
| Scottish Albums (Official Charts) | 58 |
| Swedish Albums (Sverigetopplistan) | 3 |
| Swiss Albums (Schweizer Hitparade) | 20 |
| UK Albums (Official Charts) | 37 |
| US Billboard 200 | 17 |
| US Top Classical Albums (Billboard) | 1 |

=== Year-end charts ===
Year-end chart performance for La Luna
| Chart (2000) | Position |
|---|---|
| Canadian Albums (Nielsen SoundScan) | 91 |
| South Korean International Albums (MIAK) | 37 |

== Certifications and sales ==
| Region | Certification | Certified units/sales |
|---|---|---|
| Argentina (CAPIF) | Gold | 30,000^{^} |
| Canada (Music Canada) | Platinum | 100,000^{^} |
| Japan (RIAJ) | Gold | 100,000^{^} |
| Sweden (GLF) | Gold | 80,000 |
| South Korea | — | 52,748 |
| Taiwan (RIT) | 5× Platinum | |
| United States (RIAA) | Gold | 873,000 |
^{^} Shipments figures based on certification alone.

== See also ==
- La Luna: Live in Concert
- La Luna World Tour
