= Symphony (album) =

Studio album by Sarah Brightman
- Released: 28 January 2008
- Recorded: Summer 2004-Fall 2007
- Studios: Angel Recording Studios (London, England); Clock Studio (Bologna, Italy); Abbey Road Studios (London, England); H.O.M.E.-Studios (Hamburg, Germany); Nemo Studios (Hamburg, Germany); Ocean Club Studio (Key Biscayne); Proloton Studio (Hamburg, Germany); The Nook (Los Angeles, CA); Vox Klangstudio (Bendestorf, Germany)
- Genres: Classical crossover, classical, symphonic rock
- Length: 54:10
- Label: Manhattan
- Producer: Frank Peterson

Sarah Brightman chronology
Diva: The Singles Collection (2006)	Symphony (2008)	A Winter Symphony (2008)

Singles from Symphony
- 1. "I Will Be with You" Released: 16 July 2007; 2. "Running" Released: 28 August 2007; 3. "Pasión" Released: 6 November 2007

Professional ratings
Review scores
Source	Rating
Allmusic	3.5/5 stars

Symphony is the ninth studio album from English soprano singer Sarah Brightman. This classical crossover album is a contrast to her previous collaboration with producer Frank Peterson, 2003's Harem; using a gothic influence instead of a Middle Eastern feel.

The single "Running" was the IAAF's Green Project Charity song, which Brightman performed at their 2007 Championships opening ceremonies in Ōsaka, Japan. An alternate version of the album's first single, "I Will Be with You", featuring Chris Thompson, was the theme song for the tenth Pokémon film: The Rise of Darkrai. The Spanish duet with Fernando Lima, "Pasión", was the theme song for the Mexican soap opera of the same name, and was also released as a single. The London Symphony Orchestra and Brightman's younger sister, Amelia Brightman, are featured on the album.

== Singles ==
- "I Will Be with You" (featuring Chris Thompson / Movie version) (2007)
- "Running" (2007)
- "Pasión" (featuring Fernando Lima) (2007)

== Songs ==
Recorded in Germany, Symphony featured all new songs and was created with Brightman's long-time producer Frank Peterson. The repertoire ranges from ballads such as "Symphony", "Fleurs du Mal" and rock scores "I Will Be With You", originally sung by Norwegian singer Sissel Kyrkjebø. "Jupiter" from Holst's The Planets is adapted on "Running" and Faith Hill's "There You'll Be" is sung in Italian as "Sarai Qui". On this album Brightman reunited with Andrea Bocelli to sing "Canto Della Terra", as well as singing duets with Fernando Lima (Argentinian tenor) on "Pasion" and Paul Stanley (from the band Kiss) on "I Will Be With You (Where The Lost Ones Go)". The album showcases Brightman's linguistic vocal skills by singing in Spanish, Italian, French and for the first time in German in the song "Schwere Träume", an adaptation of the fourth movement of Gustav Mahler's fifth symphony.

== Live concert album ==
A PBS special concert was filmed on 16 January 2008 at the Cathedral Stephansdom in Vienna. This was subsequently shown on PBS stations, premiering on 4 February. A version of the concert is available from PBS on DVD and the worldwide release of the DVD and live CD was on 10 March 2009.

== Album art ==
The album art for Symphony pictures Brightman in Gothic clothing and surroundings, which was based upon concept art from Guild Wars by Daniel Dociu. The album cover was photographed by long-time collaborator Simon Fowler.

== Promotion ==
On NBC in the United States, Brightman performed several songs from the album on the Progressive Fashion on Ice show on 20 January 2008. Other American television appearances included The Early Show (CBS), The View (ABC), Martha and Fox & Friends.

In Mexico, Televisa selected the song "Pasion" was the theme song of the telenovela, Pasion. In the United Kingdom, Brightman's promotion for the album included appearing on the cookery shows Saturday Kitchen and Ready Steady Cook with Lesley Garrett. Other U.K. television appearances for the album included, Channel 4's The Paul O'Grady Show, ITV's Loose Women, five's The Wright Stuff and the BBC News. Brightman also appeared on radio on Classic FM and Jonathan Ross' show on BBC Radio 2.

During April 2008, Brightman performed with Anne Murray at Canada's Juno Awards and she later appeared in May in the U.K. at the 2008 Classical BRIT Awards.

== Charts and certifications ==
In the early 2008 release, the album garnered a remarkable set of chart accolades around the world, including an unprecedented debut in the US Billboard 200 Album chart at 13 (Brightman's highest charting record in the U.S.) moving 32,033 copies in first week. It hit number one in the Mexico International charts and the US Billboard Classical Chart, the top five in Canada and Japan and the top twenty across Europe. In a long term, the album failed to match the success of its predecessors in the United States, but experienced a moderate success in Asia. In Japan the album entered the chart at No. 4 selling 25,815 copies during its first week.

== Track listing ==
No.	Title	Writer(s)	Length
1.	"Gothica"	Frank Peterson/Carsten Heusmann	1:20
2.	"Fleurs du Mal"	Peterson/Thomas Schwarz/Matthias Meissner/Martin Himmelsbach/Klaus Hirschburger/Brightman	4:10
3.	"Symphony"	Stefanie Kloß/Andreas Nowak/Johanns Stolle/Thomas Stolle/Grant Black/Brightman	4:47
4.	"Canto della Terra" (feat. Andrea Bocelli)	Francesco Sartori/Lucio Quarantotto	3:59
5.	"Sanvean"	Andrew Claxton/Lisa Gerrard	3:50
6.	"I Will Be with You (Where the Lost Ones Go)" (feat. Paul Stanley)	Espen Lind/Magnus Rostandmo/Amund Björklund	4:31
7.	"Schwere Träume"	Peterson/Michael Soltau/Hirschburger/Brightman	3:22
8.	"Sarai Qui" (feat. Alessandro Safina)	Diane Warren/Michelangelo La Bionda	3:56
9.	"Storia d'Amore"	Philip Cordel/Michelangelo La Bionda/Brightman	4:03
10.	"Let It Rain"	Carsten Heusmann/Hirschburger/Peterson	4:17
11.	"Attesa"	Pietro Mascagni/Chiara Ferrau	4:26
12.	"Pasión" (feat. Fernando Lima)	Jorge Avendaño Lührs	5:14
13.	"Running"	Peterson/Brightman/Hirschburger	6:09
Total length:			54:10

Hidden Track

On certain CD pressings, Running is followed by one minute of silence and an instrumental version of Fleurs du Mal plays, bringing the total track length to 9:11.

Japanese Edition
No.	Title	Writer(s)	Length
14.	"Forbidden Colours"	Ryuichi Sakamoto/David Sylvian	4:31
Total length:			60:41

European Edition
No.	Title	Writer(s)	Length
14.	"Sarahbande"	Peterson/Soltau	3:50
Total length:			60:03

Polish Edition
No.	Title	Writer(s)	Length
14.	"I Will Be with You (Where the Lost Ones Go)" (feat. Andrzej Lampert)	Lind/Rostandmo/Björklund	4:30
Total length:			60:47

Russian Edition
No.	Title	Writer(s)	Length
14.	"I Will Be with You (Where the Lost Ones Go)" (feat. Sergey Penkin)	Lind/Rostandmo/Björklund	4:30
Total length:			60:47

International Edition
No.	Title	Writer(s)	Length
13.	"Fleurs du Mal (Reprise)"	Peterson/Schwarz/Meissner/Himmelsbach	2:02
Total length:			56:13

== Charts ==
Weekly chart performance for Symphony
Chart (2008)	Peak position
Australian Albums (ARIA)	31
Austrian Albums (Ö3 Austria)	10
Belgian Albums (Ultratop Flanders)	8
Canadian Albums (Billboard)	4
Czech Albums ČNS IFPI)	14
Dutch Albums (Album Top 100)	20
Finnish Albums (Suomen virallinen lista)	27
German Albums (Offizielle Top 100)	21
Hungarian Albums (MAHASZ)	13
Irish Albums (IRMA)	50
Japanese Albums (Oricon)	4
Mexican Albums (AMPROFON)	5
New Zealand Albums (RMNZ)	28
Polish Albums (ZPAV)	18
Portuguese Albums (AFP)	20
Scottish Albums (Official Charts)	17
Spanish Albums (Promusicae)	43
Swedish Classical Albums (Sverigetopplistan)	2
Swiss Albums (Schweizer Hitparade)	24
UK Albums (Official Charts)	13
US Billboard 200	13
US Top Classical Albums (Billboard)	1
US Digital Albums (Billboard)	16

== Certifications and sales ==
Region	Certification	Certified units/sales
Canada (Music Canada)	Gold	50,000^{^}
Japan (RIAJ)	Gold	100,000^{^}
Mexico (AMPROFON)	Gold	40,000^{^}
South Korea	—	8,279
^{^} Shipments figures based on certification alone.
