= Love Changes Everything (Sarah Brightman album) =

Studio album by Sarah Brightman
- Released: 2005
- Genre: Vocal, musicals, show tunes
- Label: Really Useful Records/Decca Broadway
- Producer: Andrew Lloyd Webber, Nigel Wright, Mike Batt (track 10)

Sarah Brightman chronology
| The Harem World Tour: Live from Las Vegas (2004) | Love Changes Everything (2005) | Diva: The Singles Collection (2006) |

Love Changes Everything – The Andrew Lloyd Webber Collection, Volume 2 is an album by English soprano Sarah Brightman, released in 2005. It contains songs from various shows for which Andrew Lloyd Webber wrote the music. The album contains eight previously released songs along with six new recordings.

== Track listing ==
1. "Probably on a Thursday" (Note: Correct title is "Probably on Thursday", originally released by Ross Hannaman.)
2. "The Perfect Year"
3. "Only You" (with Cliff Richard)
4. "Love Changes Everything"
5. "Seeing Is Believing " (with Michael Ball)
6. "Think of Me" (with Steve Barton)
7. "Any Dream Will Do"
8. "I Don't Know How to Love Him"
9. "Too Much in Love to Care" (with John Barrowman)
10. "The Phantom of the Opera" (with Steve Harley)
11. "Make Up My Heart"
12. "Don't Cry for Me Argentina" (Spanish Version)
13. "Everything's Alright" (with Gary Martin & Bogdan Kominowski)
14. "Whistle Down the Wind" (piano with Andrew Lloyd Webber)

== Weekly charts ==
| Charts | Peak Position |
|---|---|
| Japanese Albums (Oricon) | 245 |
| US Top Classical Albums (Billboard) | 4 |
