= A Winter Symphony =

Studio album by Sarah Brightman
- Released: 4 November 2008
- Studio: Angel Recording Studios (London, England); Abbey Road Studios (London, England); Henry Wood Hall (London, England); Indice Records Studio (Mexico City, Mexico); Nemo Studios (Hamburg, Germany); Ocean Club Studio (Key Biscayne, FL); Proloton Studio (Hamburg, Germany); South Beach Studio (Miami, FL); Vox Klangstudio (Bendestorf, Germany)
- Genre: Vocal, Christmas
- Length: 43:50
- Label: Manhattan Records
- Producer: Frank Peterson

Sarah Brightman chronology
Symphony (2008)	A Winter Symphony (2008)	Symphony: Live in Vienna (2009)

Singles from A Winter Symphony
- 1. "Silent Night" Released: 11 October 2008; 2. "I Believe in Father Christmas" Released: 4 November 2008; 3. "I Wish It Could Be Christmas Everyday" Released: 5 December 2008

Professional ratings
Review scores
Source	Rating
AllMusic	2.5/5 stars

A Winter Symphony is a Christmas album and the tenth studio album by the English soprano singer Sarah Brightman, released in November 2008.

== Album information ==
The album borrows its name from Brightman's earlier 2008 album, Symphony.

A deluxe edition included extra tracks and a DVD that featured a making-of featurette, a photo gallery, and Brightman's live performances of four songs from NBC's Fashion on Ice show.

The album includes a number of traditional songs: "Silent Night", "In the Bleak Midwinter", and "Child in a Manger", as well as two versions of "Ave Maria", one being the classical piece by French composer Charles Gounod, and the other an original composition by Mexican composers Loris Ceroni and Jorge Avedaño, performed as a duet in Spanish with tenor Fernando Lima. It also features contemporary pop songs such as Vince Gill's "Colder Than Winter", a cover of Neil Diamond's "I've Been This Way Before", and Wizzard's "I Wish It Could Be Christmas Everyday".

== Promotion and reception ==
On the week of 15–22 December, Brightman's "Silent Night" was the iTunes "Free Single of the Week", and the video for "I Believe in Father Christmas" was launched to accompany the single. Brightman also performed "Silent Night" at the Walt Disney World Christmas Day Parade, filmed on 23 December 2008 and broadcast by ABC on 25 December 2008.

A Winter Symphony won Classical Album of the Year at the 23rd Japan Gold Disc Awards.

== Track listing ==
Standard edition
No.	Title	Lyrics	Music	Length
1.	"Arrival"	Frank Peterson; Amelia Brightman	Benny Andersson; Björn Ulvaeus	3:15
2.	"Colder than Winter"	Vince Gill	Gill	4:02
3.	"Ave Maria" (duet with Fernando Lima)	Traditional	Loris Ceroni; Jorge Avendaño Lührs	4:08
4.	"Silent Night"	Joseph Mohr, trans. John F. Young (Note: Credited only as "Traditional".)	Franz Xaver Gruber (Note: Adapted or arranged by Frank Peterson and Carsten Heusmann.)	3:08
5.	"In the Bleak Midwinter"	Christina Rossetti	Gustav Holst	3:43
6.	"I've Been This Way Before"	Neil Diamond	Diamond	3:50
7.	"Jesu, Joy of Man's Desiring"	attr. Robert Bridges	Johann Sebastian Bach	3:58
8.	"Child in a Manger"	Mary MacDonald, trans. Lachlan Macbean	Traditional	3:08
9.	"I Wish It Could Be Christmas Everyday"	Roy Wood	Wood	4:48
10.	"Amazing Grace"	John Newton	Traditional	3:04
11.	"Ave Maria"	Traditional	Bach; Charles Gounod; (Note: Arranged by Frank Peterson.)	2:52
12.	"I Believe in Father Christmas"	Peter John Sinfield	Greg Lake; Sergey Prokofiev	3:44
Total length:				43:50

Borders exclusive edition
No.	Title	Writer(s)	Length
13.	"He Moved through the Fair"	Traditional	2:13
Total length:			46:03

Deluxe edition — CD bonus tracks
No.	Title	Writer(s)	Length
13.	"When a Child Is Born"	Dario Baldan Bembo; Zacar; Alberto Salerno; Maurizio Seymandi; Francesco Specchia, trans. Fred Jay (Note: Jay is uncredited.)	3:41
14.	"Carpe Diem" (duet with Mario Frangoulis)	Freddy Scholl; Florian Sitzmann; Cae Gauntt	3:58
15.	"Happy Christmas (War Is Over)"	John Lennon; Yoko Ono	3:28
Total length:			54:58

Japanese deluxe edition
No.	Title	Writer(s)	Length
16.	"First of May"	Robin Gibb; Maurice Gibb; Barry Gibb	2:55
17.	"He Moved through the Fair"	Traditional	2:13
Total length:			60:07

Deluxe edition — DVD
No.	Title	Writer(s)	Length
1.	"The Making of A Winter Symphony"
2.	"Fleurs du Mal" (live from Fashion on Ice)	Frank Peterson; Thomas Schwarz; Matthias Meissner; Martin Himmelsbach; Klaus Hirschburger; Sarah Brightman
3.	"Symphony" (live from Fashion on Ice)	Stefanie Kloß; Andreas Nowak; Johanns Stolle; Thomas Stolle; Grant Black; Brightman
4.	"Let It Rain" (live from Fashion on Ice)	Carsten Heusmann; Hirschburger; Peterson
5.	"Running" (live from Fashion on Ice)	Peterson; Brightman; Hirschburger
6.	"Photo Gallery"

== Chart performance ==
Selling about 14,000 copies in the first week in the United States, the album debuted at number thirty-eight on the Billboard Top 200. It also made another debuts such as the Top Classical Crossover Albums at number-three; It scored a number six in the Top Holiday Albums, being the first entry for Brightman on this chart and debuted at number-four on the Top Internet Albums. In Japan, the album debuted in the top 15, peaking at No. 12 selling 13,953 copies in its first week of release.

=== Charts ===
Chart (2008)	Peak position
US Billboard Top Classical Albums	3
US Billboard Top Holiday Albums	6
Canadian Billboard Top Albums Chart	9
Japanese Oricon Top Albums Chart	10
Mexican Top 100 Albums Chart	13
Greek Albums Chart	20
Finland Albums Charts	35
US Billboard Top 200 Albums	38
Sweden Album Charts	32
World Albums Charts	40
UK Albums Chart	177

=== Certifications ===
Region	Certification	Certified units/sales
Canada (Music Canada)	Gold	40,000^{^}
Japan (RIAJ)	Gold	129,350
^{^} Shipments figures based on certification alone.
