= Sarah Brightman =

English pop and classical soprano singer (born 1960)

Cavaliere Sarah Brightman
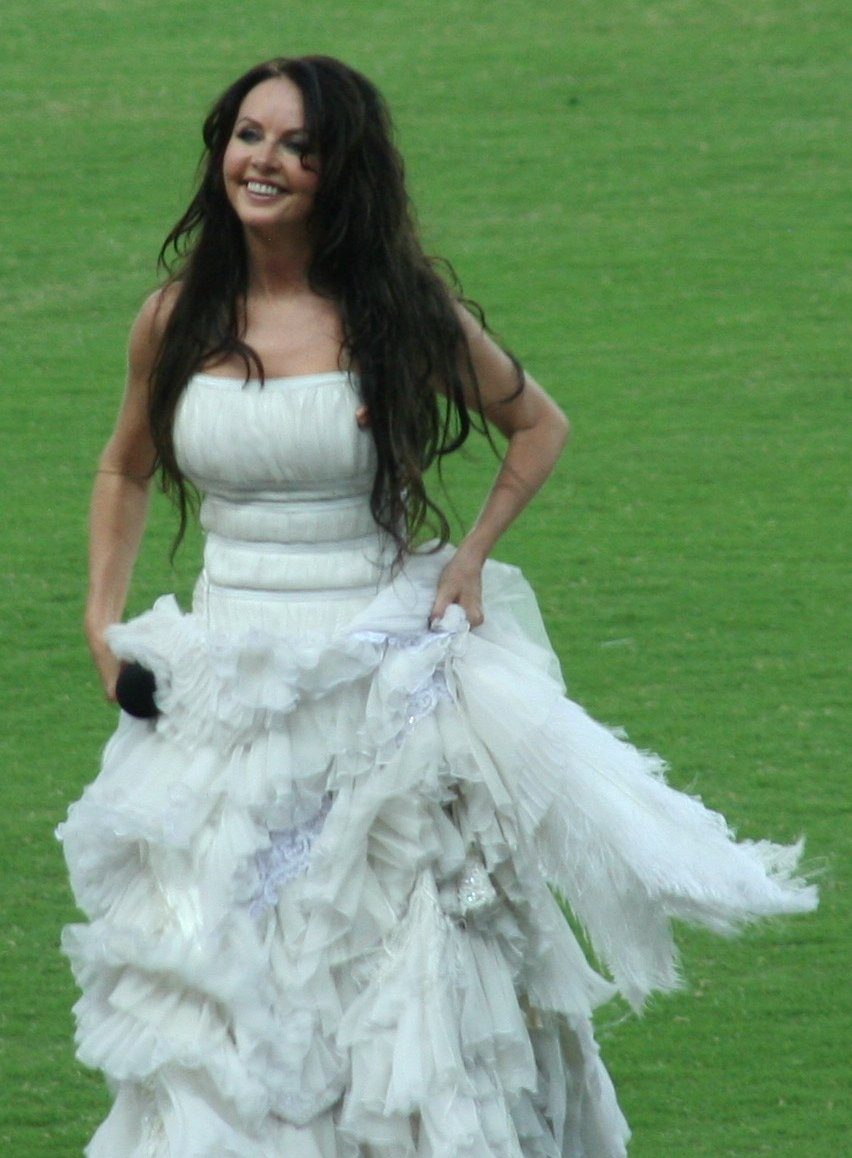
- Brightman at the World Athletics Championships in Osaka in 2007
- Born: 14 August 1960 (age 66); Berkhamsted, Hertfordshire, England
- Occupations: Singer; actress; dancer
- Years active: 1978–present
- Spouses: Andrew Graham-Stewart (m. 1979; div. 1983); Andrew Lloyd Webber (m. 1984; div. 1990)
- Musical career
- Genres: Classical crossover; operatic pop; pop; world; musical theatre; new age; ambient; electronica; symphonic rock; folk
- Instruments: Vocals; piano
- Labels: A&M (1993); East West (1995–2001); Angel; EMI (1997–2007); Manhattan; EMI (2008–2010); Simha (2012–present)
- Formerly of: Hot Gossip
- Website: sarahbrightman.com

Sarah Brightman (born 14 August 1960) is an English classical crossover soprano singer and actress.

Brightman began her career as a member of the dance troupe Hot Gossip and released several disco singles as a solo performer. In 1981, she made her West End musical theatre debut in Cats and met composer Andrew Lloyd Webber, whom she later married. She went on to star in several West End and Broadway musicals, including The Phantom of the Opera, where she originated the role of Christine Daaé. Her original London cast album of Phantom was released in CD format in 1987 and sold 40 million copies worldwide, making it the biggest-selling cast album ever.

After retiring from stage acting and divorcing Lloyd Webber, Brightman resumed her music career with former Enigma producer Frank Peterson, this time as a classical crossover artist. She has been credited as the creator and remains among the most prominent performers of this genre, with worldwide sales of more than 25 million albums and two million DVDs, establishing herself as the world's best-selling soprano.

Brightman's 1996 duet with the Italian tenor Andrea Bocelli, "Time to Say Goodbye", topped the charts all over Europe and became the highest and fastest-selling single of all time in Germany, where it stayed at the top of the charts for 14 consecutive weeks and sold over three million copies. It subsequently became an international success, selling 12 million copies worldwide, making it one of the best-selling singles of all-time. She has collected over 200 gold and platinum record awards in 38 countries. In 2010, she was named by Billboard the fifth most influential and best-selling classical artist of the 2000s decade in the US and according to Nielsen SoundScan, she has sold 6.5 million albums in the country.

Brightman is the first artist to have been invited twice to perform the theme song at the Olympic Games, first at the 1992 Barcelona Olympic Games where she sang "Amigos Para Siempre" with the Spanish tenor José Carreras with an estimated global audience of one billion people, and 16 years later in 2008 in Beijing, this time with Chinese singer Liu Huan, performing the song "You and Me" to an estimated four billion people worldwide.

In 2012, Brightman was appointed as the UNESCO Artist for Peace for the period 2012–2014, for her "commitment to humanitarian and charitable causes, her contribution, throughout her artistic career, to the promotion of cultural dialogue and the exchanges among cultures, and her dedication to the ideals and aims of the Organization". Since 2010, Brightman has been Panasonic's global brand ambassador.

== Family, early life, and education ==
Brightman is the eldest of six children of businessman Grenville Brightman (1934–1992) and Paula Brightman, née Hall. She was brought up in Little Gaddesden near Berkhamsted, Hertfordshire, England. At the age of three she began taking dance and piano classes. She then went on to perform in local festivals and competitions. At age 11, she successfully auditioned for the Tring Park School for the Performing Arts, a school specialising in performing arts.

She received her education at Elmhurst Ballet School, Camberley, the Arts Educational School in Chiswick, West London, and the Royal College of Music.

In 1973, at the age of 13, Brightman made her theatrical debut in the musical I and Albert at the Piccadilly Theatre, London, playing one of Queen Victoria's daughters (Victoria). In 1976 she was recruited into Arlene Phillips' troupe Hot Gossip in 1977. The group had a disco hit in 1978 with "I Lost My Heart to a Starship Trooper", which sold half a million and reached number six on the UK charts. She was also briefly with Pan's People after they parted with their host show Top of the Pops in 1976. Brightman, now solo, released more disco singles under her own label, Whisper Records, such as "Not Having That!" and a cover of the song "My Boyfriend's Back". In 1979, Brightman appeared on the soundtrack of the film The World Is Full of Married Men and sang the song "Madam Hyde".

== Career ==
=== 1981–1989: Stage career ===
In 1981, Brightman auditioned for the new musical Cats, by composer Andrew Lloyd Webber, and was cast as Jemima. After a year in Cats, Brightman took over from Bonnie Langford as Kate in The Pirates of Penzance at the Drury Lane Theatre, London, and appeared as Tara Treetops in Masquerade, a musical based on Kit Williams's book of the same title. Beginning on 18 December 1982, she left to play the title role in Charles Strouse's children's opera, Nightingale.

Enticed by a rave review, Lloyd Webber went to watch her in the show one evening and was greatly impressed by her performance. Though she had appeared in his musical Cats, Lloyd Webber had not previously singled Brightman out as a great talent. The two married in 1984, and Brightman appeared in Lloyd Webber's subsequent musicals including The Phantom of the Opera and Song and Dance, as well as the mass Requiem, which was written and composed for Lloyd Webber's father.

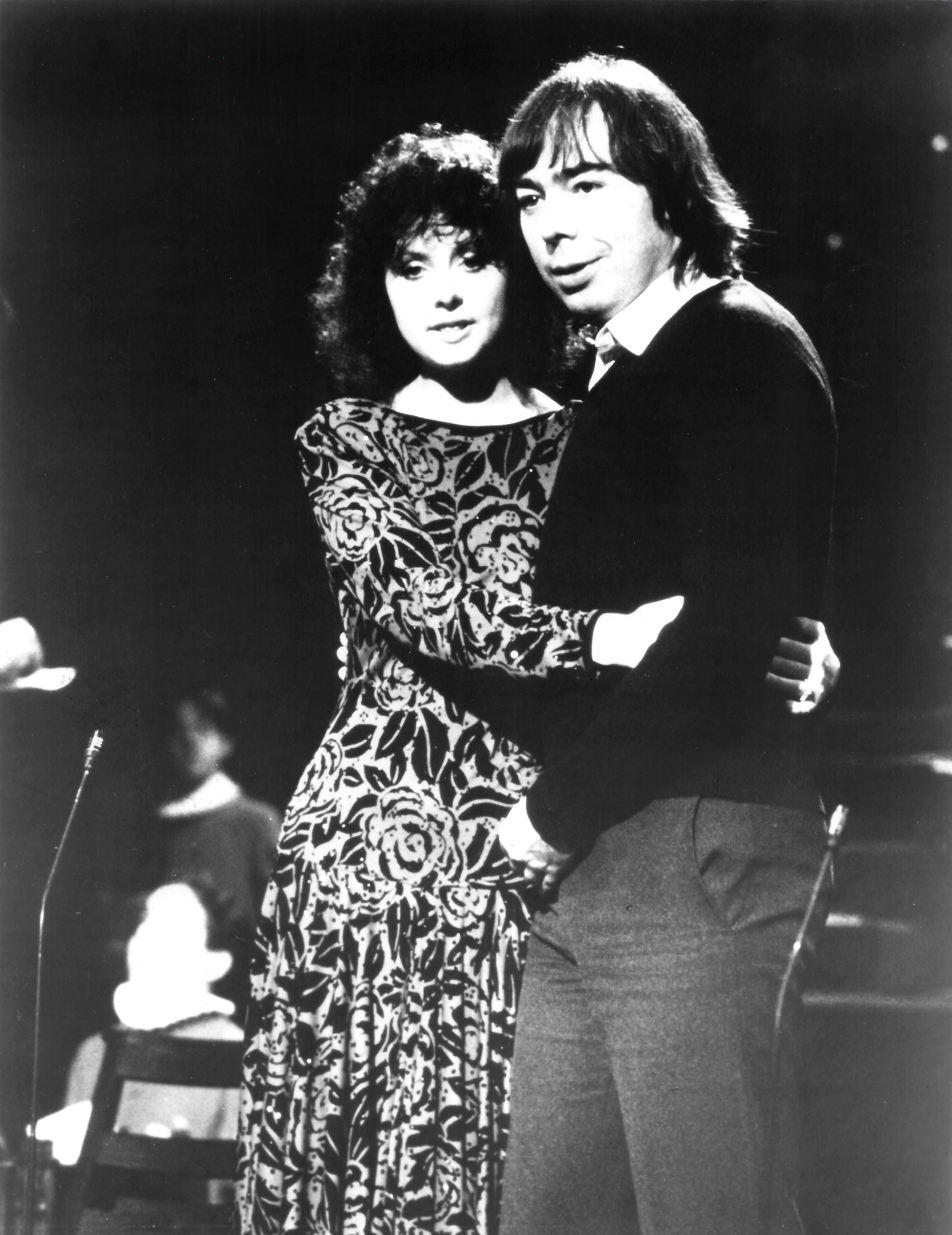
Brightman and then-husband Andrew Lloyd Webber at the world premiere performance of Requiem at Saint Thomas Church in New York City

In 1985, Brightman's recording of "Pie Jesu" was a strong commercial success, selling 25,000 copies on the first day of release and peaking at number 3, despite the lyrics being in Latin. With classical music permeating the Lloyd Webber household (Brightman was in heavy operatic training at the time), Lloyd Webber was moved to write the Requiem Mass as a tribute to his father. Its Manhattan premiere, starring Plácido Domingo and Brightman, was filmed by the BBC and PBS for later broadcast. The LP eventually became UK's top selling classical album of the year and earned Brightman a Grammy nomination as Best New Classical Artist.

Brightman starred as Christine Daaé in Lloyd Webber's adaptation of The Phantom of the Opera. The role of Christine was written specifically for her. Lloyd Webber refused to open The Phantom of the Opera on Broadway unless Brightman played Christine. Initially, the American Actors' Equity Association balked, because of their policy that any non-American performer must be an international star. Lloyd Webber had to cast an American in a leading role in his next West End musical before Equity would allow Brightman to appear (a promise he kept in casting Aspects of Love). In the end, it was a compromise that was successful. Phantom received $17 million in advance sales prior to opening night on 26 January 1988. The original cast album was the first in British musical history to enter the music charts at number one. Album sales now exceed forty million worldwide—the biggest selling cast album of all time—and has gone six times platinum in the United States, twice platinum in the UK, nine times platinum in Germany, four times platinum in the Netherlands, 11 times platinum in Korea and 31 times platinum in Taiwan. Despite the success both in London and on Broadway, Brightman received mostly negative reception from critics for her performance and was not nominated for Best Lead Actress in a Musical at the Tony Awards. While some reviewers praised Brightman's singing, her acting was widely criticised.

After leaving Phantom, she performed in a tour of Lloyd Webber's music throughout England, Canada and the United States, and performed Requiem in the Soviet Union. Studio recordings from this time include the single "Anything But Lonely" from Aspects of Love and two solo albums: the 1988 album The Trees They Grow So High, a collection of folk songs accompanied by piano, and the 1989 album The Songs That Got Away, a compilation of obscure musical theatre songs from shows by such composers as Irving Berlin and Stephen Sondheim. Brightman also sang the song "Make Believe" during the credits of the children's film Granpa; Howard Blake composed the music and wrote the lyrics.

She was a subject of the television programme This Is Your Life in 1989 when she was surprised by Michael Aspel at RAF Wittering in Cambridgeshire.

By 1990, Brightman and Lloyd Webber had separated. After their highly publicized divorce, Brightman played the lead in Lloyd Webber's Aspects in London opposite Michael Praed, before transferring to Broadway. Her subsequent solo album, As I Came of Age, was an eclectic collection of folk-rock and musical theatre songs that Brightman herself chose.

=== 1990s: Solo career ===
In 1992, Brightman performed with José Carreras at the Barcelona Olympic Games singing the theme song "Amigos Para Siempre" ("Friends Forever"). Following the appearance, Brightman pursued solo recording, and inspired by the German band Enigma, she requested to work with one of its members, Frank Peterson. Their first release together was Dive (1993), a water-themed pop album that featured "Captain Nemo", a cover of a song by the Swedish electronica band Dive. The album received her first Gold award in Canada.

Brightman and Peterson's second collaboration yielded the pop rock album, Fly (1995) with the single "A Question of Honor"—a mélange of electronic, rock, classical strings and excerpts from the Alfredo Catalani opera La Wally. The song and the video were introduced at the World Boxing Championship match between Germany's Henry Maske and Graciano Rocchigiani.

In 1997, Brightman released the album Timeless/Time to Say Goodbye. It remains as Brightman's biggest-selling album. It went gold, platinum and/or multi-platinum in 21 countries, selling over 1.4 million copies in the US, and topped the Billboard Top Classical Crossover Albums chart in the US for 35 weeks. The lead single from the album, "Time to Say Goodbye", was the second song that Brightman debuted at the World Boxing Championship in Germany. This duet with tenor Andrea Bocelli became an international hit and sold more than 3 million copies in Germany. The album eventually sold over 12 million copies worldwide.

In March 1998, Brightman produced her first own PBS special, Sarah Brightman: In Concert at the Royal Albert Hall. The same year, Brightman starred in A Gala Christmas in Vienna alongside Plácido Domingo, Helmut Lotti and Riccardo Cocciante singing traditional Christmas carols. On 7 April 1998 she was one of the guest stars in Andrew Lloyd Webber's 50th birthday celebration singing Hosanna with Dennis O'Neill, the title song of The Phantom of the Opera with Antonio Banderas, "All I Ask of You" with Michael Ball and "Music of the Night", both also from Phantom of the Opera.

With the success of Timeless, Brightman released her next album, Eden in 1998. She personally selected each song and convinced the Italian composer Ennio Morricone to let her set lyrics to one of his film compositions, "Gabriel's Oboe" from the film The Mission resulting in "Nella Fantasia". The album, unlike Time to Say Goodbye, incorporated more pop music elements. Reviews were mixed – LAUNCHcast deemed Eden "deliriously sappy", while AllMusic called Eden "a winning combination". Eden reached No. 1 on the US Billboard Top Classical Crossover Albums chart and No. 65 on the Billboard 200 chart and was certified Gold in the United States.

=== 2000–2004: Further international success ===
In 2000, La Luna was released. For this album, Brightman chose songs drawing on pop, vintage jazz, and high opera, in homages to Dvořák, Beethoven and Billie Holiday. La Luna reached No. 1 on the US Billboard Top Internet Albums and peaked at No. 17 on the Billboard 200 chart, becoming Brightman's second highest-selling album in the United States with sales of 900,000 and reaching Gold certification. It became her biggest-selling album in Asia, with a quintuple platinum certification in Taiwan.

At her 2000 PBS La Luna concert, Brightman sang "There for Me" in a duet with an up-and-coming star, Josh Groban. At the end of 2001, Billboard magazine noted Brightman as the most important classical crossover artist from the United Kingdom.

In 2001, Brightman released Classics, an anthology including highlights from three of Brightman's chart-topping releases along with seven new tracks; this was released worldwide except Europe. In the US the album peaked at No. 66 on the Billboard 200 chart and went Gold. In Canada it peaked at No. 9 and was certified Platinum; and in Japan, Classics became Brightman's most successful release at the time with 300,000 units sold and reaching Platinum status.

Her 2003 album Harem represented another departure: a Middle Eastern-themed album influenced by dance music. On Harem, Brightman collaborated with artists such as Ofra Haza and Iraqi singer Kazem al-Saher. Nigel Kennedy contributed violin tracks to the songs "Free" and "The War is Over" and Jaz Coleman contributed arrangements.

The album peaked at No. 29 on the Billboard 200 chart, No. 1 on the Billboard Top Classical Crossover Albums chart, No. 1 on the Swedish Album Chart, and yielded a No. 1 dance/club single with the remix of the title track. Some time later, another single from the album (the ballad "Free", cowritten with Sophie B. Hawkins) became a second Top-10 hit on this chart.

The albums Eden, La Luna and Harem were accompanied by live world tours which incorporated the theatricality of her stage origins. Brightman acknowledged this in an interview, saying, "They're incredibly complicated...[but also] natural. I know what works, what doesn't work, all the old tricks". In both 2000 and 2001, Brightman was among the top 10 most popular British performers in the US, with concert sales grossing $7.2 million from 34 shows in 2000 and over $5 million from 21 shows in 2001.

In 2004, the Harem World Tour grossed $60 million and sold 700,000 tickets, $15 million and 225,000 sales of which came from the North American leg, although with ticket prices raised 30% from previous tours, average sales per venue were up 65%. In North America, Harem tour promoters Clear Channel Entertainment (now Live Nation) took the unusual step of advertising to theatre subscribers, in an effort to reach fans of Brightman's Broadway performances, and also sold VIP tickets, at $750 each, which included on-stage seating during the concert and a backstage pass. Tour reviews were mixed: one critic from the New York Times called the La Luna tour "not so much divine but post-human" and "unintentionally disturbing: a beautiful argument of emptiness."

Television specials on PBS were produced for nearly every Brightman album in the US; a director of marketing has credited these as her number-one source of exposure in the country. Her concert for Eden was among PBS's highest-grossing pledge events.

=== 2006–2008: Diva, Symphony and Beijing Olympics appearance ===
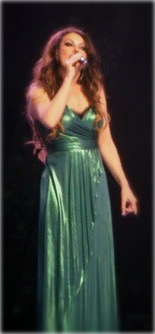
Brightman performing in Auburn Hills, US, during her Symphony World Tour

Brightman released a DVD collection of her music videos on 3 October 2006 under the title of Diva: The Video Collection. The Singles Collection is the accompanying CD, released on the same date. The album marked the first time Brightman released a greatest hits album in the United States; it reached No. 1 on the Billboard Top Classical Crossover Albums chart. In Japan, the album debuted and peaked at No. 2 with 77,000 copies sold on its first week of release, and became Japan's biggest-selling classical album of 2007. Subsequently, it was Japan's fifteenth best-selling international album of the 2000s decade. By 2008, the album achieved a Double-Platinum certification. With Diva, Brightman was also South Korea's best-selling international artist of 2010 as the album topped the international charts all throughout the year. Diva was certified Quintuple Platinum and its digital single, "Nella Fantasia" sold over 2 million units. Other releases in Europe were The Very Best of 1990–2000 and Classics: The Best of Sarah Brightman.

On 1 July 2007, Brightman appeared at the Concert for Diana held at Wembley Stadium, London, an event organised to celebrate the life of Princess Diana of Wales, where she sang "All I Ask of You" from The Phantom of the Opera with Josh Groban. Around 15 million people across the UK watched Concert for Diana at home, and it was broadcast to over 500 million homes in 140 countries. On 7 July 2007 Brightman performed four songs ("Nessun dorma", "La Luna", "Nella Fantasia" and "Time to Say Goodbye") at the Live Earth Concert Series, and debuted her single "Running" at the 2007 IAAF Championships in Osaka, Japan. In this period Brightman also recorded a duet with Anne Murray singing "Snowbird", which was included on Murray's 2007 album Anne Murray Duets: Friends and Legends.

On 29 January 2008, Brightman released her first album in five years: Symphony, influenced by gothic music. In the United States, it became Brightman's most successful chart entry and also her highest ranked album on Billboard's "Top 200 Albums". It was also a No. 1 album on two other Billboard charts: "Top Internet Albums" and "Top Classical Crossover Albums". The album moved there 32,033 copies in first week, according to Nielsen Soundscan. The album was a top 5 release in China, Taiwan, Canada, Mexico and Japan and a top 20 across Europe.

Featured on the album were artists Andrea Bocelli, Fernando Lima, and Kiss vocalist Paul Stanley, who sang duets with Brightman on "I Will Be with You", the album version of the theme song to the tenth Pokémon motion picture, Dialga VS Palkia VS Darkrai (Pokémon: The Rise of Darkrai). On 16 January 2008, she also appeared in concert at Vienna's Stephansdom Cathedral, performing songs from her new album. Special guests who sang duets with Brightman include Italian tenor Alessandro Safina, Argentinean countertenor Fernando Lima, and British singer Chris Thompson.

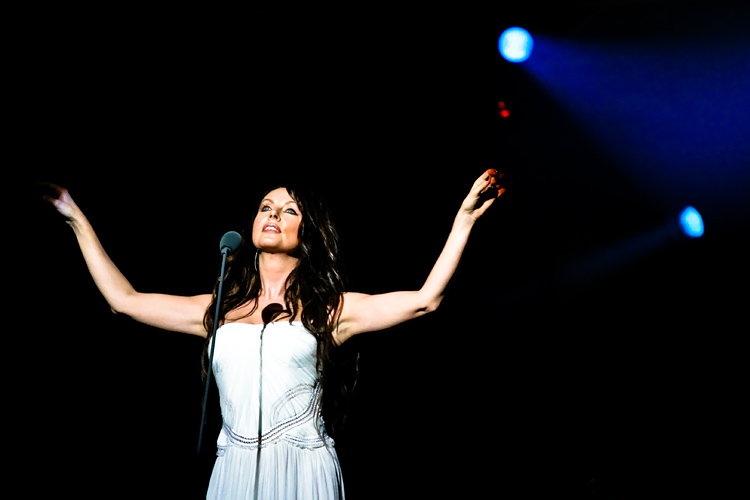
Brightman performing in Live Earth Concert in Shanghai, China (2007)

Brightman performed "Pie Jesu" and "There You'll Be" at the United States Memorial Day concert on 25 May 2008 held on the west lawn of the United States Capitol in Washington, D.C. The show was broadcast live on PBS before a concert audience of 300,000, as well as to American troops serving around the world on the American Forces Radio and Television Network. Brightman made her feature film debut as Blind Mag in the rock musical film Repo! The Genetic Opera which was released on 7 November 2008. Brightman was cast in the film at the last minute after the original actress who was cast for the role was dropped.

On 8 August 2008, Brightman sang the Olympic theme song, "You and Me", with Chinese star Liu Huan in both Mandarin and English at the Beijing Olympics opening ceremony. The performance was broadcast to over five billion viewers. In the 26 hours after the performance, "You and Me" was downloaded 5.7 million times.

Brightman released her first holiday album, entitled A Winter Symphony on 4 November 2008. The album debuted at number No. 38 on the Billboard 200 and scored a number six in the Top Holiday Albums. The album was composed of an array of Christmas favourites including "Silent Night" and "In the Bleak Midwinter". Also featured are a duet in "Ave Maria" with Mexican Tenor Fernando Lima, covers of pop tracks including ABBA's instrumental song "Arrival" plus a rendition of Neil Diamond's, "I've Been this Way Before".

To accompany Symphony and A Winter Symphony, Brightman embarked on a tour in Autumn 2008; "The Symphony World Tour", that included virtual and holographic stage sets.

=== 2009–2010: Symphony: Live in Vienna and UNESCO World Heritage Sites concerts ===
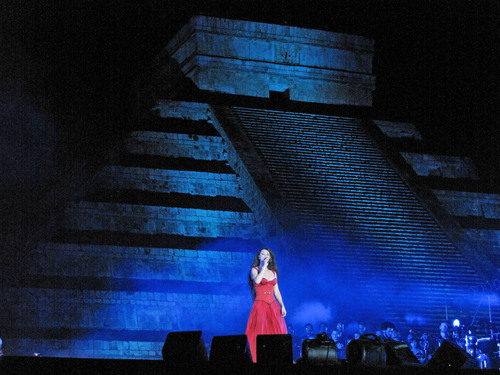
Brightman performing in Chichen Itza, Mexico

In response to persistent calls for a global release of the Symphony: Live in Vienna concert, EMI Music launched worldwide the PBS special which featured Brightman's performance at St. Stephen's Cathedral, Vienna, on 16 January 2008, in both audio and visual formats. The Symphony—Live in Vienna television special debuted on PBS in March 2008 during the network's spring pledge drive and aired throughout the month. Symphony: Live in Vienna was listed as the thirteenth best-selling album of the year in Mexico.

The music of Brightman was featured in the film Amarufi: Megami no hôshû (international title: Amalfi: Rewards of the Goddess), which was a special production to mark Fuji Television's 50th anniversary, the first Japanese film to be shot entirely on location in Italy. In conjunction with the release of the film Amalfi, Brightman released only in Japan an album titled Amalfi – Sarah Brightman Love Songs which reached Gold status and was Japan's best-selling classical album of 2009. At the end of the year, Brightman was the seventh best selling international artist in Japan.

Brightman performed "The Concert of the Pyramid" at the archaeological site of Chichen Itza, a UNESCO World Heritage Site and one of the New Seven Wonders of the World. One year later, in 2010, Brightman continued touring Asia with five performances in Tokyo alone, followed by presentations in Kanazawa, Nagoya, Osaka in Japan, Macau in China and Seoul in South Korea.

On 3 November 2010, Brightman was invited to sing at the Tōdai-ji Buddhist temple complex located in the city of Nara, Japan. The temple is a listed UNESCO World Heritage Site as one of the "Historic Monuments of Ancient Nara". The concert was recorded and later broadcast nationwide by TBS network.

=== 2011–2015: UNESCO, Dreamchaser and space tourism ===
Brightman performing her Dreamchaser World Tour in Buenos Aires, Argentina (2013)

In early 2012, Brightman received the UNESCO Artist for Peace Award for her "commitment to humanitarian and charitable causes, her contribution, throughout her artistic career, to the promotion of cultural dialogue and the exchanges among cultures, and her dedication to the ideals and aims of the Organization". She was also appointed as Panasonic's global brand ambassador, and is the face of Panasonic's strategic partnership agreement with the UNESCO World Heritage Centre as she starred in their joint campaign, "The World Heritage Special," that was aired on the National Geographic Channel worldwide.

On 10 October 2012, Brightman hosted a press conference in Moscow announcing her intention to become a space tourist on a future orbital spaceflight mission to the International Space Station (ISS) in partnership with Space Adventures, Ltd., a private space experiences company. Brightman was to have paid around £34 million for the trip, which she said she had paid herself.

On 16 April 2013, Brightman released her eleventh studio album, Dreamchaser. The offering was inspired by her decision to become the first singer in outer space. This album was Brightman's first collaboration with producer Mike Hedges and Sally Herbert. It received acclaim from critics, many considering it Brightman's strongest work to date, and many pointed out the coherence of the song choices and the quality of Brightman's vocals. Dreamchaser was Brightman's first album to enter on the Billboard Independent Albums chart, became her seventh No. 1 album in the Billboard Top Classical Albums chart and made a strong debut in the Billboard 200 at No. 17 moving 20,358 copies on its first week of release.

During the autumn season 2013, Brightman performed the Dreamchaser World Tour in Canada, Mexico, the United States, China, Japan, South Korea, Thailand, Hong Kong, Qatar, United Arab Emirates, Brazil, Chile, Argentina, Russia, Sweden, Ukraine, Latvia, Finland, Turkey and Bulgaria. The concert tour was very successful as it entered the list of the top-grossing tours in North America during the respective season. On 6 June, Brightman filmed a new PBS TV special entitled Sarah Brightman: Dreamchaser in Concert at Elstree Studios where she set up a competition so fans could have the chance of winning tickets to attend the exclusive filming. Dreamchaser in Concert aired on PBS on 3 August, with a setlist of twelve songs (plus two bonus songs) featuring both new songs and well-known favorites.

In 2014, she began training for a space tourism journey to the International Space Station. On 13 May 2015, she cancelled her trip to the International Space Station, citing family reasons. With her backup, Satoshi Takamatsu, also withdrawing from the flight, Kazakh cosmonaut Aidyn Aimbetov replaced Brightman on Soyuz TMA-18M.

=== 2016–2017: Order of Merit of the Italian Republic, continuous touring ===
On 2 June 2016, Brightman received the Italian decoration 'Cavaliere' in the Ordine al Merito della Repubblica Italiana by the Consul General of Italy, Francesco Genuardi. During the ceremony, Genuardi expressed, the motivation of Brightman's distinction: "Ms. Sarah Brightman who with her extraordinary voice and with her excellent music has contributed in an excellent way in spreading the Italian language and culture at a high level worldwide". The private ceremony was held on the occasion of the Festa della Repubblica Italiana (The Italian National Day) at the Consulate General of Italy in New York City.

On 6 July 2016, Brightman released her eighth compilation album: Gala – The Collection. This album was released exclusively on Japan in commemoration of the tour, Gala: An Evening with Sarah Brightman. The concert tour would later add more destinations, presenting shows in other Asian countries, such as South Korea, China and Taiwan. Once finished in March 2017, Brightman had presented 25 shows in three different continents. During the same month, Brightman performed at Starmus 3 Festival in Tenerife, Canary Islands, in honour of Professor Stephen Hawking along with composer Hans Zimmer and Anathema. On 7 January 2017, Brightman presided over the naming ceremony as godmother of the Richard Branson's new 600-guest ship MV Seabourn Encore, the first of two new all-suite vessels for the company.

On 27 March 2017, Brightman co-headlined the concert tour Royal Christmas Gala, along with Gregorian, Mario Frangoulis, Narcis Iustin Ianău, and Fernando Varela. The tour consisted of 23 European dates on the months of November and December of that same year, centered around the festive season.

=== 2018–2022: Hymn, Phantom China project and honorary doctorate ===
On 7 June, Brightman announced in Shanghai that she will be joining a team of celebrity judges on a musical theatre casting TV show. Judges will be searching for the first Chinese Phantom in 2020. The selected winner will not only perform on stage in the Chinese production of The Phantom of the Opera, but will possibly also appear in London's West End or the New York City Broadway production as well.

On 10 September, she was awarded an honorary doctorate from the University of Hertfordshire, in recognition of her outstanding contributions to music and theatre.

On 17 September 2018, Brightman announced her fifteenth full-length album Hymn, which was released on 9 November 2018 under Decca Gold/ Universal Music Group. The following week, on 16 November, the digital single "Miracle (Sarah's Version)", composed by Japanese musician and composer Yoshiki, was released, reaching the top 10 on iTunes classical music charts in 15 countries. In addition to the new album, Brightman announced a world tour, which began in South America in November 2018 and included 125 shows across five continents throughout 2019, concluding with her return to London's Royal Albert Hall for the first time over 20 years, with guest performers from the Hymn album Narcis, Vincent Niclo, and Yoshiki.

In 2022, Brightman became a judge of the talent competition show Yoshiki Superstar Project X, airing on Hulu Japan and produced by Yoshiki. In September 2023, Brightman was featured in the music documentary film Yoshiki: Under the Sky.

=== 2023–present: Sunset Boulevard and Sunset Over Broadway ===
Sarah Brightman as Norma Desmond

On 7 January 2024, Brightman was featured as the vocalist for the mobile game Love and Deepspace theme song “Love and Deepspace.”

On 10 October 2023, it was announced that Brightman would take the lead role of Norma Desmond in the 2024 Australian season of Sunset Boulevard in Melbourne at Melbourne's Princess Theatre from 21 May to 28 July 2024, before moving to the Sydney Opera House for residence from 29 August to 1 November 2024.

Brightman headlined the production's official Asian premiere at the Sands Theatre at Marina Bay Sands in Singapore, which ran from 7 to 23 February 2025 following the conclusion of the Australian dates, featuring a traditional Golden Age Hollywood staging.

Brightman reprised her role as Norma Desmond alongside Australian co-star Tim Draxl in a strictly limited Japanese engagement of the Sunset Boulevard production at the Tokyu Theatre Orb in Shibuya, Tokyo, from 10 July to 1 August 2026.

On 17 July 2026, Brightman released her studio album in a Japan-only release, called Sunset Over Broadway (A Collection of Songs Inspired by Movies and Musicals). It is her first new studio-recorded work in eight years, since 2018's Hymn. The album is currently available exclusively in Japan on CD and as a digital download, with international release dates to be announced later.

== Music and voice ==
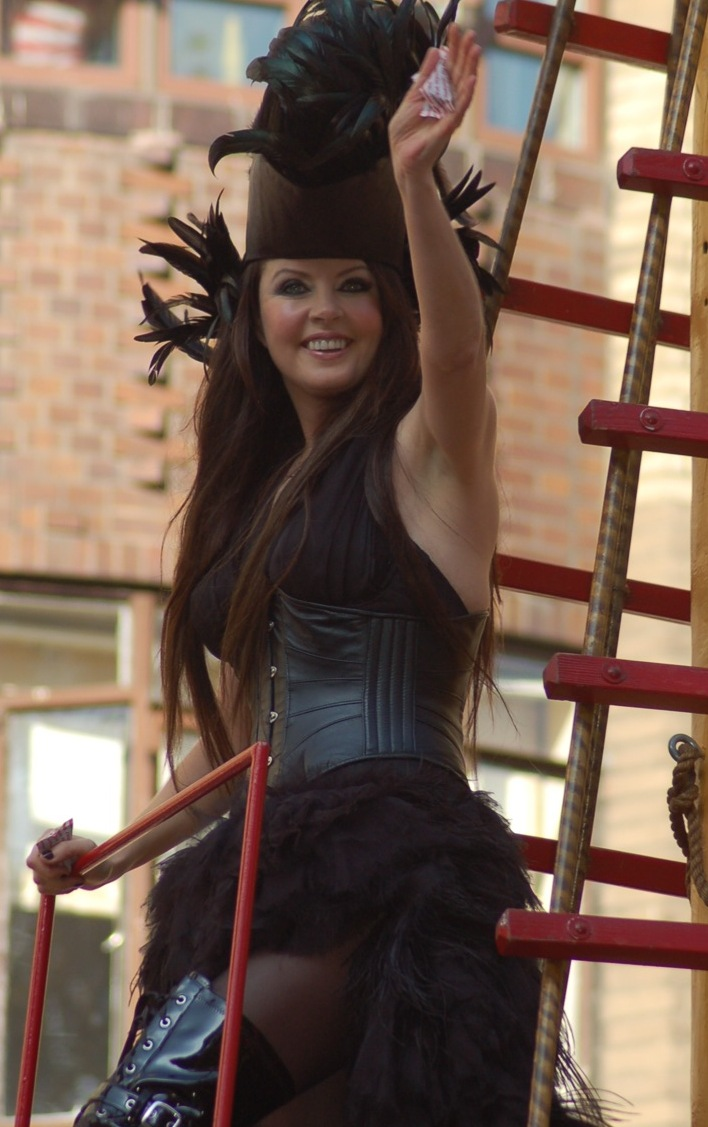
Brightman performing "The Journey Home" at the Macy's Thanksgiving Day Parade in 2007

Brightman underwent vocal training first with Elizabeth Hawes, head of the Trinity Music College in London, and later with Ellen Faull of Juilliard. She also studied with voice teacher David Romano. According to Brightman, her voice can reach an F6.

David Caddick, a conductor of Phantom, has stated:

What is amazing about Sarah is that she has two voices, really. She can produce a pop, contemporary sound, but she can also blossom out into a light lyric soprano. The soprano part of her voice can go up to a F6 above her known E6. She doesn't sing it full out, but it is there. Of course, she has to dance while she is singing some of the time, so it's all the more extraordinary.

She sometimes uses her pop and classical voices in the same song. One example is "Anytime, Anywhere" from Eden, a song based on Albinoni's Adagio in G minor. In the song, she starts out in classical voice, switches to pop voice temporarily, and finishes with her classical voice. Another example is heard in the Lions Gate film Repo! The Genetic Opera, during the songs "Chase The Morning" and "Chromaggia" by her character, Blind Mag.

Brightman's music is generally classified as classical crossover. According to Manhattan Records GM Ian Ralfini, she is largely responsible for the popularity of the genre. In a 2000 interview with People, Brightman dismissed the classical crossover label as "horrible" but stated she understood people's need to categorise music. Her personal influences include 1960s and 1970s musicians and artists such as David Bowie and Pink Floyd, and she incorporates aspects of genres from pop/rock to classical. Her work has also been compared to that of Madonna, Cher and Celine Dion. The material on her albums ranges from versions of opera arias from composers such as Puccini (on Harem, Eden, and Timeless), to pop songs by artists such as Kansas ("Dust in the Wind" on Eden), Dido ("Here with Me" on La Luna), and Procol Harum ("A Whiter Shade of Pale" on La Luna). She sings in many languages, including English, Spanish, French, Latin, Italian and Japanese.

== Personal life ==
At age 18, in 1979, Brightman married Andrew Graham-Stewart, who at that time managed the German band Tangerine Dream. She later met Andrew Lloyd Webber when she performed in Cats. In 1983, Brightman divorced Graham-Stewart and later that same year, Lloyd Webber divorced his first wife, Sarah Hugill, with whom he had two children. Lloyd Webber and Brightman married on 22 March 1984 and their relationship quickly became the subject of intense media and tabloid scrutiny until their divorce in 1990. They are on friendly terms; in 2006, at the 20th London anniversary of The Phantom of the Opera, Lloyd Webber called Brightman a "wonderful woman" and "absolutely beloved mentor", and she performed at the 25th anniversary of the musical in 2011. He appeared as a special guest in her 1997 concert at the Royal Albert Hall in London.

Brightman had a 10-year relationship with Frank Peterson, during which they tried and were unsuccessful in having children. In a 2006 interview with British magazine Hello!, she said motherhood would have been "lovely" but accepted that she would never have a child.

== Charity work ==
On 8 February 2012, Brightman accepted the UNESCO nomination to be an "Artist for Peace" Ambassador. Additionally, she is actively engaged in Panasonic's UNESCO World Heritage Centre endeavours, and stars in their The World Heritage Special campaign.

In 2012, in conjunction with Virgin Galactic, the Brightman STEM Scholarship program (science, technology, engineering and mathematics) was launched. It will help young women in the US pursue STEM education across their four-year college careers.

On 27 June 2013, the Reignwood Group announced at the Beijing Theatre that Brightman would be a promotional ambassador for its 10 Trinity Square, a landmark in the Reignwood Group's global expansion, in London for the next four years. This is the second time for the group to cooperate with an influential artist, the first being with tenor Plácido Domingo, in 2008.

In November 2013, Brightman donated US$533,000 to those affected by Hurricane Ingrid in the Mexican state of Guerrero—the entire profit from her sold-out show in Mexico City on 13 November 2013.

On 30 October 2013, Brightman announced through the media that she was honoured to be part of the Advisory Council for the Challenger Center, the non-profit science, technology, engineering and maths (STEM) education organisation, stating "[t]hrough my partnership with the Challenger Center, I hope to inspire in children the same wonder and excitement for space exploration that I feel myself." Challenger Center and its network of more than 40 Challenger Learning Centers engage students in hands-on experiences that strengthen knowledge in science, technology, engineering and maths (STEM) and inspire students to pursue careers in these important fields.

In April 2014, Brightman participated as an orchestra director in Parkinson's UK Symfunny at the Royal Albert Hall 4 June, with the aim of funding research to find a cure for the disease.

In July 2015, the inaugural Andrew Lloyd Webber Foundation Sarah Brightman Music Scholarships were also awarded to their first recipients. The scholarships will support students in their postgraduate studies at the Royal Northern College of Music on the two-year Master of Music Programme.

== Awards ==
Brightman has received over 180 Gold and Platinum sales awards in over 40 countries.

Brightman was awarded the decoration 'Cavaliere' in the Order of Merit of the Italian Republic on 2 June 2016.

Awards show	Nomination(s)	Categories	Results
1986 Grammy Awards	(Herself)	Best New Classical Artist	Nominated
1988 Drama Desk Awards	The Phantom of the Opera	Outstanding Actress in a Musical	Nominated
1996 Echo Awards	(Herself)	Best Female Artist	Nominated
1996 RSH Gold Awards	(Herself)	Best Female Artist	Won
1997 Echo Awards	(Herself)	Best Female Artist	Nominated
1998 Echo Awards	Time to Say Goodbye	Best Song of the Year	Won
1998 Golden Lion Awards	(Herself)	Best Live Performance	Won
1998 Goldene Europa Awards	(Herself)	Best Female Artist	Won
1999 Czechoslovak Grammy	(Herself)	Singer of the Year	Won
1999 Echo Awards	(Herself)	Best Female Artist	Nominated
1999 The Point Trophy	One Night in Eden Tour	Best Tour of the Year	Won
2001 New Age Voice Music Awards	La Luna	Best Vocal Album	Won
2004 Arabian Music Awards	The War Is Over (with Kazim Al Saher)	Best Collaboration	Won
2004 Arabian Music Awards	(Herself)	Best Female Artist	Won
2005 New York Film Festival	Harem: A Desert Fantasy	Best Music Documentary	Won
2005 New York Film Festival	Time to Say Goodbye	Best Music Video	Won
2007 The 21st Japan Gold Disc Award	Diva: The Singles Collection	Classical Album of the Year	Won
2009 The 23rd Japan Gold Disc Award	A Winter Symphony	Classical Album of the Year	Won
2009 Lunas del Auditorio	Symphony: Live in Vienna	Best Pop Album in Foreign Language	Nominated
2010 The 24th Japan Gold Disc Award	Amalfi – Sarah Brightman Love Songs	Classical Album of the Year	Won
2010 Lunas del Auditorio	(Herself)	Best Artist in Foreign Language	Nominated
2013 Shorty Awards	(Herself)	Social Media Best Singer	Nominated

Year	Nominee / work	Award	Result
1998	Sarah Brightman	Guinness World Records Entry – Germany's Best-Selling Single of All Time (Time to Say Goodbye)	Won
1998	Sarah Brightman	UNESCO Hand-in-Hand Award	Won
2001	Sarah Brightman	Golden Key to the City of Chicago	Won
2003	Sarah Brightman	Media Control Award – Biggest Hit of All Time (Time to Say Goodbye)	Won
2004	Sarah Brightman	Golden Key to the City of Istanbul	Won
2012	Sarah Brightman	UNESCO Artist for Peace Award	Won
2016	Sarah Brightman	Cavaliere of the Ordine al Merito della Repubblica Italiana Award	Won
2022	Sarah Brightman	Star on the Hollywood Walk of Fame under the category of live performance	Won

== Stage credits ==
=== Musicals ===
- I and Albert (as Princess Victoria and street waif), 1973 Piccadilly Theatre, London
- Cats (as Jemima), 1981 New London Theatre
- Masquerade (as Tara Treetops), 1982 Young Vic
- Nightingale (as Nightingale), 1982 Buxton Festival and the Lyric, Hammersmith
- Song and Dance (as The Girl/Emma), Palace Theatre in London on 28 April 1984
- The Phantom of the Opera (as Christine Daaé), 1986 Her Majesty's Theatre London, 1988 Majestic Theatre Broadway
- Aspects of Love (as Rose Vibert), Broadhurst Theatre on Broadway in December 1990, Prince of Wales Theatre in London in 1991, and Wilshire Theatre in Los Angeles in March 1993
- Sunset Boulevard (as Norma Desmond), 2024 Princess Theatre, Melbourne and Sydney Opera House, and in 2025, Singapore, Chinese and Taiwan tour, 2026 Tokyu Theatre Orb

=== Operetta ===
- The Pirates of Penzance (as Kate), 1982
- The Merry Widow (as Valencienne), 1985

=== Plays ===
- Trelawny of the "Wells" (as Rose Trelawny), 1992 Harold Pinter Theatre
- Relative Values (as Miranda Frayle), 1993 Chichester Festival and Savoy Theatre
- Dangerous Obsession (as Sally Driscoll), 1994 Haymarket Theatre, Basingstoke
- The Innocents (as Miss Giddens), 1995 Haymarket Theatre, Basingstoke

== Filmography ==
- Song and Dance, 1984 film performed live on stage.
- Granpa, 1989 animated children's film, singing "Make Believe" over the end credits
- Brokedown Palace, 1999 film, singing "Deliver Me"
- Zeit der Erkenntnis, 2000 German feature film, as herself
- Repo! The Genetic Opera, 2008 feature film, as Blind Mag
- Amarufi: Megami no hôshû (Amalfi: Rewards of the Goddess), 2009 feature film (Japan), as herself
- First Night, 2010 feature comedy film, as Celia
- The Phantom of the Opera, 2011 25th anniversary film performed live at the Royal Albert Hall, as herself

=== DVD live concerts ===
- Sarah Brightman: In Concert
- A Gala Christmas in Vienna
- One Night in Eden
- La Luna: Live in Concert
- The Harem World Tour: Live from Las Vegas
- Symphony: Live in Vienna – Recorded at St. Stephen's Cathedral, Vienna
- Dreamchaser in Concert
- Hymn: Sarah Brightman in Concert
- A Christmas Symphony (featuring Aled Jones) – This is also her second concert where she invited Andrew Lloyd Webber as one of her special guests. Recorded at Christ Church, Spitalfields.

== Selected discography ==
=== Studio albums ===
- 1988: The Trees They Grow So High
- 1990: As I Came of Age
- 1993: Dive
- 1995: Fly
- 1997: Timeless
- 1998: Eden
- 2000: La Luna
- 2003: Harem
- 2008: Symphony
- 2008: A Winter Symphony
- 2013: Dreamchaser
- 2018: Hymn

=== Albums with Lloyd Webber ===
- 1989: The Songs That Got Away
- 1992: Sarah Brightman Sings the Music of Andrew Lloyd Webber
- 1995: Surrender
- 1997: The Andrew Lloyd Webber Collection
- 2002: Encore
- 2005: Love Changes Everything

=== Compilation albums ===
- 2001: The Very Best of 1990–2000 & Classics
- 2006: Classics: The Best of Sarah Brightman
- 2006: Diva: The Singles Collection
- 2009: Amalfi – Sarah Brightman Love Songs & Bella Voce
- 2014: Voce – Sarah Brightman Beautiful Songs (Japan only)
- 2015: Rarities Vol. 1, Vol. 2, Vol. 3 (digital only)
- 2016: Gala – The Collection (Japan only)
- 2020: France (France only)
- 2026: Sunset Over Broadway (Japan only)

== Duets ==
- Andrea Bocelli – "Time to Say Goodbye", "Canto della Terra"
- Plácido Domingo – Requiem, "The Closing of the Year", "Là ci darem la mano", "Love Unspoken", "Time to Say Goodbye", "La traviata: Libiamo ne' lieti calici (Brindisi)", "Die Lustige Witwe – Lippen Schweigen", "The Phantom Of The Opera: All I Ask Of You", "West Side Story: Maria & Tonight", "Fröhliche Weihnacht", "Cantemos rapaces", "Angels from the Realms of Glory", "Santa Claus is Coming to Town", "Happy Christmas", "Silent Night"
- John Gielgud – "Gus: the Theatre Cat"
- José Carreras – "Amigos para Siempre", "Love Unspoken", "La traviata: Libiamo ne' lieti calici... Brindisi", "Subaru"
- Michael Crawford – The Phantom of the Opera (Andrew Lloyd Webber): "Little Lotte.../The Mirror...", "The Phantom of the Opera", "I Remember.../"Stranger Than You Dreamt It...", "Notes.../Twisted Every way...", "Wandering child.../Bravo, Monsieur...", The Point of No Return", "Down Once More.../Track Down This Murder..."
- Steve Barton – The Phantom of the Opera (Andrew Lloyd Webber): "Think of Me", "Little Lotte.../The Mirror...", "Why Have You Brought Me Here.../Raoul, I've Been There...", "All I Ask of You", "Notes.../Twisted Every Way...", "Wandering Child.../Bravo, Monsieur...", "Down Once More.../Track Down This Murderer..."
- Rosemary Ashe – The Phantom of the Opera (Andrew Lloyd Webber): "Think of Me", "Notes.../Twisted Every Way..."
- Elaine Paige – Cats (Andrew Lloyd Webber): "Memory"
- Brian Blessed – Cats (Andrew Lloyd Webber): "The Moments of Happiness"
- Gordon Sandison – Nightingale (Charles Strouse): "I Was Lost", "Death Duet"
- Alexa Vega – Repo! The Genetic Opera: "At the Opera Tonight", "Chase the Morning", "Everyone's a Composer"
- Paris Hilton – Repo! The Genetic Opera: "At the Opera Tonight", "Bravi!", "Luigi, Pavi, Amber Harass Mag"
- Bill Moseley – Repo! The Genetic Opera: "At the Opera Tonight", "Bravi!", "Luigi, Pavi, Amber Harass Mag"
- Paul Sorvino – Repo! The Genetic Opera: "At the Opera Tonight", "Bravi!", "Luigi, Pavi, Amber Harass Mag", "Seeing You Stirs Memories (Part 2)"
- Ogre – Repo! The Genetic Opera: "At The Opera Tonight", "Bravi!", "Luigi, Pavi, Amber Harass Mag"
- Anthony Stewart Head – Repo! The Genetic Opera: "At the Opera Tonight", "Everyone's a Composer"
- Terrance Zdunich – Repo! The Genetic Opera: "At the Opera Tonight"
- Colm Wilkinson – The Phantom of the Opera at the Royal Albert Hall (Nick Morris & Laurence Connor): "The Phantom of the Opera"
- Anthony Warlow – The Phantom of the Opera at the Royal Albert Hall (Nick Morris & Laurence Connor): "The Phantom of the Opera"
- Peter Jöback – The Phantom of the Opera at the Royal Albert Hall (Nick Morris & Laurence Connor): "The Phantom of the Opera"
- John Owen-Jones – The Phantom of the Opera at the Royal Albert Hall (Nick Morris & Laurence Connor): "The Phantom of the Opera"
- Ramin Karimloo – The Phantom of the Opera at the Royal Albert Hall (Nick Morris & Laurence Connor): "The Phantom of the Opera"
- José Cura – "Just Show Me How to Love You", "There for Me"
- Josh Groban – "There for Me", "All I Ask of You"
- Andrew Lloyd Webber – "Whistle Down the Wind"
- Tom Jones – "Something in the Air"
- Antonio Banderas – "The Phantom of the Opera"
- Cliff Richard – "All I Ask of You", "Only You"
- John Barrowman – "Too Much in Love To Care"
- Gary Martin – "Everything's Alright"
- Gregorian – "Eden", "Free", "Moment of Peace", "Join Me", "Heroes", "When A Child is Born", "Send Me An Angel", "Voyage Voyage", "Don't Give Up", "Vide Cor Meum", "Hymn (Live from Royal Christmas Gala & A Christmas Symphony)"
- Riccardo Cocciante – "Cantemos Rapaces", "Child in a Manger", "Santa Claus is Coming to Town", "Happy Christmas", "Silent Night"
- Helmut Lotti – "Fröhliche Weihnacht", "Cantemos Rapaces", "Christmas is Here Again", "Santa Claus is Coming to Town", "Happy Christmas", "Silent Night"
- Geoffrey Parsons – "The Trees They Grow So High"
- Kadim Al-Saher – "The War Is Over"
- Nigel Kennedy – "Free", "The War is Over", "Gueri de Toi"
- Ofra Haza – "Mysterious Days"
- Shweta Shetty – "The Journey Home", "Arabian Nights"
- Natacha Atlas – "Arabian Nights", "Harem French version with Natacha Atlas", "French/English version with Natacha Atlas"
- Asha Bhosle – "You Take My Breath Away"
- Chris Thompson – "How Can Heaven Love Me", "I Will Be With You (Where The Lost Ones Go)", "The Phantom of the Opera", "You Take My Breath Away"
- Fernando Lima – "Pasión", "Ave Maria"
- Alessandro Safina – "Sarai Qui", "Canto della Terra", "The Phantom of the Opera" (Symphony World Tour – México, Asia), "There for Me" (Gala – An Evening with Sarah Brightman Tour)
- Mario Frangoulis – "Carpe Diem", "Sarai Qui", "Canto della Terra", "The Phantom of the Opera" (Symphony World Tour – EE.UU., Canadá)
- Vincent Niclo – "Sogni"
- Paul Stanley – "I Will Be With You (Where The Lost Ones Go)"
- Liu Huan – "You And Me"
- Schiller – "The Smile"
- Sash! – "The Secret Still Remains" or "The Secret" & "The Secret (2007)"
- Hot Gossip – "I Lost My Heart to a Starship Trooper"
- Prince Ital Joe Feat. Marky Mark – "Happy People", "Life in the Streets" (Background vocals Sarah Brightman)
- Michael Ball – "All I Ask of You", "Seeing is Believing"
- Andrzej Lampert – "I Will Be With You (Where The Lost Ones Go)"
- I Muvrini – "Tu Quieres Volver"
- Eric Adams – "Where Eagles Fly"
- Jacky Cheung – "There For Me"
- Richard Marx – "The Last Words You Said"
- Randy Waldman – "The Last Words You Said"
- Stephan Moccio – "What You Never Know"
- Lukas Hilbert – "Mysterious Days"
- Steve Harley – "The Phantom of the Opera"
- Erkan Aki – "Just Show Me How To Love You","The Phantom of the Opera", "Canto della Terra" and "Sarai Qui" (Sarah Brightman in Concert 2009 and Dreamchaser World Tour).
- Paul Miles-Kingston – "Pie Jesu"
- Seiko Matsuda – Sweet Memories [1998]
- Andrew Swait: "Pie Jesu" (The Classical Brit Awards – 8 May 2008)
- Mark Butcher – "Take The Weather With You", "Heroes", "Leaving on a Jet Plane", "Let's Face The Music And Dance", "Music of the Night", " Ain't No Sunshine", "The Rose", "Moon River"
- Princessa – "Calling You" (1996) (Background vocals Sarah Brightman)
- Anne Murray – "Snowbird"
- Betty Buckley – "Memory" (Kennedy Center Honor – 3 December 2006)
- Lesley Garrett – "Abide with me" (FA Cup Final 19 May 2007)
- Jackie Evancho – "Time to Say Goodbye" – (America's Got Talent – 15 September 2010)
- SASH! – "The Secret" (29 March 2013) (Featuring Sarah Brightman)
- Israel Kamakawiwoʻole – "Hawaii 78"
- Narcis Iustin Ianău – "Pie Jesu" (Gala – An Evening with Sarah Brightman Tour)
- Yoshiki – "Miracle"
- Eric Whitacre Singers – "Fly To Paradise"
- Vincent Niclo – "Sogni"
- Greg Eisenson – "Walking in the Air" (2025) (A Winter Symphony Tour)
- Jay Dref – "The Phantom of the Opera" (2025) (A Winter Symphony)

== Tours ==
- "A Timeless Evening with Sarah Brightman" (UK and Germany) 1997
- "One Night in Eden Tour" 1999 (Worldwide)
- "La Luna World Tour" 2000–2001 (Worldwide)
- "Harem World Tour" 2004–2005 (2004: Worldwide, 2005: Mini-Tour in Japan)
- "The Symphony World Tour" 2008–2009 (Worldwide)
- "Sarah Brightman in Concert" October 2009 (Latin America)
- "Sarah Brightman in Concert with Orchestra" October 2010 (Asia)
- "Dreamchaser World Tour" 2013–2014 (Worldwide)
- "Gala: An Evening with Sarah Brightman" 2016 (Japan, China, South Korea, Taiwan, Turkey, Mexico, Indonesia)
- "Royal Christmas Gala" – co-headlining concert tour with Gregorian, Fernando Varela, Mario Frangoulis, and Narcis; November – December 2017 (Europe)
- "Hymn: Sarah Brightman In Concert" 2018–2020 (Worldwide)
- "A Christmas Symphony" 2021 (USA) 2022 (Asia) 2023 (Canada/USA) 2024 (USA/Mexico) Jay Dref, Greg Eisenson – 2025 (Canada/USA)
- "A Starlight Symphony" – featuring special guest Yoshiki – 2022 (USA and Mexico)

== See also ==
- List of artists who reached number one on the U.S. Dance Club Songs chart
- List of Billboard number-one dance club songs
