= Eden (Hooverphonic song) =

1998 single by Hooverphonic

Single by Hooverphonic

from the album Blue Wonder Power Milk
- B-side: "Tuna"
- Released: 1998
- Genre: Trip hop
- Length: 3:33
- Label: Columbia
- Songwriter(s): Alex Callier
- Producer(s): Hooverphonic, Mark Plati

Hooverphonic singles chronology
"Club Montepulciano" (1998)	"Eden" (1998)	"This Strange Effect" (1998)

"Eden" is the third single from Belgian group Hooverphonic's album Blue Wonder Power Milk, released in 1998. The album peaked at No. 12 on the Belgian singles chart, charting for 13 weeks. The song appeared on the soundtrack of I Still Know What You Did Last Summer.

== Track listing ==
1. "Eden" (Single version)
2. "Tuna"

== Sarah Brightman version ==
"Eden"

Single by Sarah Brightman

from the album Eden
- B-side: "He Moved Through the Fair"; "First of May"
- Released: 1998
- Studio: Nemo Studios (Hamburg, Germany); Nemo Studios (London, England); Angel Recording Studios (London, England); Bal Harbour Studios (Miami, FL); Abbey Road Studios (London, England); The Oxford Church
- Label: Angel Records
- Songwriter(s): Alex Callier
- Producer(s): Frank Peterson

Sarah Brightman singles chronology
"There for Me" (1998)	"Eden" (1998)	"Deliver Me" (1999)

Sarah Brightman covered the song from her album of the same name, Eden, released in 1998. It peaked at #68 on the UK Singles Chart. A music video for "Eden" was also filmed.

The song "He Moved Through the Fair" is exclusive to the CD single. The CD was available in both two-track and three-track varieties.

=== Track listing ===
1. "Eden"
2. "He Moved Through the Fair"
3. "First of May"

"Eden"
Sample of Sarah Brightman's version of "Eden".
