= Alessandro Safina =

Italian operatic pop tenor

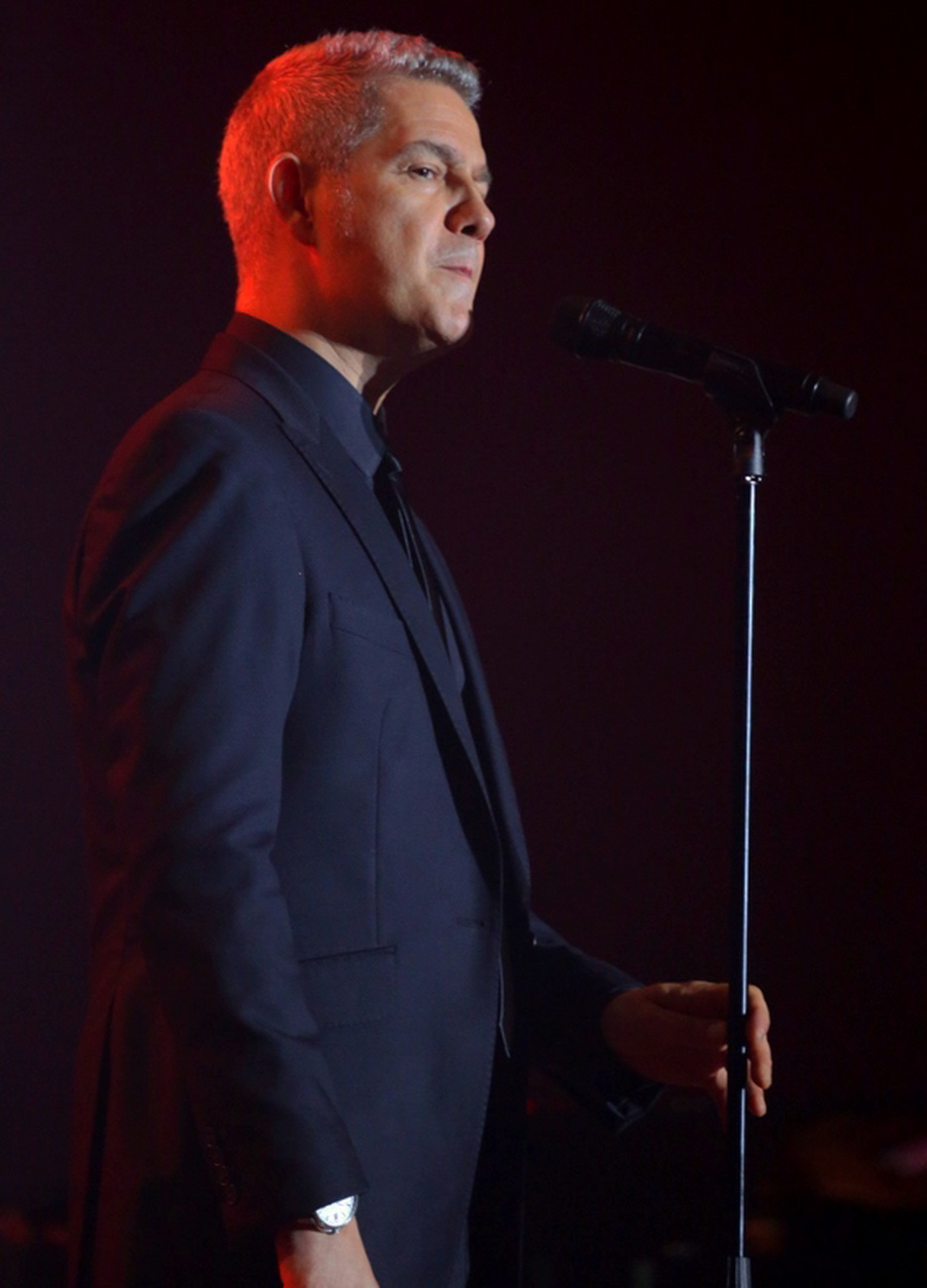
- Alessandro Safina in Beirut in 2015

Background information
- Born: Siena, Italy
- Genres: Classical crossover, Operatic pop (Popera)
- Occupation: Singer
- Label: Universal
- Website: alessandrosafina.com

Alessandro Safina (Italian pronunciation: [alesˈsandro saˈfiːna]) is an Italian operatic pop tenor.

Born in Siena, Italy, Safina has sought to combine his interests in opera and modern pop music.

== Music education ==
Safina began to study music when he was nine years old and attended a music academy at the age of 12. At 17, he was accepted to the Conservatorio di Musica "Luigi Cherubini" in Florence, Italy.

In 1989, he won the "Concorso Lirico Internazionale" in Mantova, Italy, and this led to his opera debut. In 1990 he appeared with soprano Katia Ricciarelli as Rodolfo in Puccini's La bohème.

== Career ==
In the '90s, Safina began recording with Italian pianist/composer Romano Musumarra and his self-titled debut was issued in September 2001. Safina's single "Luna", released in 1999, reached number 2 in the Dutch charts.

In 2001, Safina contributed to the score of Baz Luhrmann's film Moulin Rouge! where he performed Elton John's "Your Song" with Ewan McGregor, and a part of the Elephant Love Medley, sung by Ewan McGregor and Nicole Kidman. That same year, his song Luna was part of the soundtrack of the soap opera O Clone from Rede Globo, Safina, also made a guest appearance in the soap opera. In November 2001, Safina sang Andrew Lloyd Webber's "Music of the Night" for Queen Elizabeth II during the Royal Variety Show.

By 2002, Safina's album Insieme A Te sold 700,000 copies worldwide. In March, 2002, he performed "Del Perduto Amore" at the San Remo Music Festival. He also recorded "Your Song" with Elton John for Sport Relief, a charity venture to help children. Safina's concert "Only You", featuring Patricia Manterola, was taped in the amphitheatre El Greco in Taormina, Sicily in 2001, and was later broadcast in the series Great Performances by American public channel PBS and released in 2003 on DVD. Also in 2003, Safina performed the English and Korean vocals for a Korean song called "Hamangyeon" (하망연(何茫然)), part of the soundtrack for Dae Jang Geum, and he appeared as Mario Cavaradossi in Tosca e Altre Due, a film based on the opera Tosca by Puccini.

In 2007, he recorded a duet with the British soprano Sarah Brightman for her album, Symphony. He then joined her for the Symphony World Tour in 2008 where he sang "Canto della Terra" and "Sarai Qui" with Brightman.

In June 2017, Safina performed "'O sole mio" with Italian tenor Andrea Bocelli at the Peoples' Friendship Palace in Tashkent, Uzbekistan.

Duets:

- "Brindisi" from Giuseppe Verdi's opera La traviata with opera soprano Sumi Jo.
- "Life Goes On" with Dutch singer Petra Berger.
- "Aria e Memoria" with Chrissie Hynde of The Pretenders
- "Don't Get Around Much Anymore" with rock musician Rod Stewart.
- "Bile, Bile" with Turkish singer Sezen Aksu.

== Discography ==
- Insieme A Te (1999)
- Alessandro Safina (2001)
- Insieme A Te [With Bonus tracks] (2001)
- Musica Di Te (2003)
- Sognami (2007)
- Dedicated (2014)
- "La Siete Di Vivere" single (1999)
- "Luna" single (2000)
- "Life Goes On" single; duet with Petra Berger (2007)

== Personal life ==
Safina was married to Italian dancer Lorenza Mario from 2001 to 2011, with whom he has a son Pietro (born 2002). Currently, Safina and partner Laura Maria Calafeteanu, a marketing consultant, live together in Bucharest, Romania with their son, Christian, born in 2015.
