= Eden (Sarah Brightman album) =

Studio album by Sarah Brightman
- Released: UK 9 November 1998; Europe 19 November 1998; USA 16 March 1999
- Recorded: 1998
- Studio: Nemo Studios (Hamburg, Germany); Nemo Studios (London, England); Angel Recording Studios (London, England); Bal Harbour Studio (Miami, FL); Abbey Road Studios (London, England); Capitol Studios (Hollywood, CA); The Oxford Church; The Enterprise (Burbank, CA)
- Genre: Classical Crossover
- Length: 55:20
- Label: East/West; Angel Records
- Producer: Frank Peterson

Sarah Brightman chronology
The Andrew Lloyd Webber Collection (1997)	Eden (1998)	La Luna (2000)

Singles from Eden
- 1. "Eden" Released: 1998; 2. "Deliver Me" Released: 1999; 3. "So Many Things" Released: 1999; 4. "The Last Words You Said" Released: 1999; 5. "Dust in the Wind" Released: 1999

Professional ratings
Review scores
Source	Rating
Allmusic	4/5 stars

Eden is the sixth album by English soprano Sarah Brightman, released in 1998 under license by Nemo Studios to Angel Records.

Similar to Brightman's later album La Luna, Eden juxtaposed English popular songs with Italian opera arias. This was a departure from her previous albums, such as Fly, which were almost entirely sung in English. Eden retained elements of Timeless, which had strongest classical influences.

Eden contains one classic rock interpretation, "Dust in the Wind". It was released as a single and experienced a big success in Brazil, because it was featured on the soundtrack of the soap opera Andando nas Nuvens (Walking on the Clouds). The single "Deliver Me" also gained certain mainstream American success because of its inclusion on the soundtrack of the 1999 film Brokedown Palace.

Subsequent to the release of Eden, Brightman performed her first world tour ever, One Night In Eden Tour, and released the VHS/DVD One Night in Eden.

== Track listing ==
No.	Title	Writer(s)	Length
1.	"In Paradisum"	Sarah Brightman, Frank Peterson, Traditional	3:12
2.	"Eden"	Alex Callier	3:59
3.	"So Many Things"	Peterson, Traditional	2:58
4.	"Anytime, Anywhere"	Brightman, Peterson, Michael Soltau	3:20
5.	"Baïlèro"	Peterson, Traditional	3:13
6.	"Dust in the Wind"	Kerry Livgren	3:42
7.	"Il Mio Cuore Va"	James Horner	4:28
8.	"Deliver Me"	Helen, Jon Marsh	4:00
9.	"Un Jour Il Viendra"	Gabriel Yared	3:40
10.	"Nella Fantasia"	Ennio Morricone, Brightman	3:38
11.	"Tú"	José María Cano	4:09
12.	"Lascia Ch'io Pianga"	George Frederick Handel	3:30
13.	"Only an Ocean Away"	Per Andréasson	4:55
14.	"Scène D'Amour"	Francis Lai	3:19
15.	"Nessun Dorma"	Peterson, Giacomo Puccini	3:06
Total length:			55:20

International Edition
No.	Title	Writer(s)	Length
16.	"The Last Words You Said" (Feat. Richard Marx)	Janey Clewer, Richard Marx	4:12
Total length:			59:33

Eden & Time to Say Goodbye Edition
No.	Title	Writer(s)	Length
1.	"Time to Say Goodbye (Con te partirò)" (Feat. Andrea Bocelli)	Francesco Sartori, Lucio Quarantotto	4:08
2.	"Sleep Tight" (Previously Unreleased)		3:37
3.	"You Take My Breath Away"	Peterson, Brightman	7:11
4.	"Time to Say Goodbye (Con te partirò)" (Sarah's Intimate Version)	Sartori/Quarantotto	4:08
5.	"Desert Rose"		2:08
Total length:			21:13

VCD Edition – US Audiophile Edition
No.	Title	Length
1.	"Eden" (Music Video)	3:59
2.	"Deliver Me" (Music Video)	4:00
3.	"Who Wants to Live Forever" (Music Video)	3:56
4.	"Artist Interview"	10:00
Total length:		21:57

VCD Edition – Live in Taipei
No.	Title	Length
1.	"Il Mio Cuore Va" (Live Performance)	5:42
2.	"So Many Things" (Live Performance)	4:02
3.	"Eden" (Live Performance)	4:53
4.	"Anytime, Anywhere" (Live Performance)	3:57
5.	"Only An Ocean Away" (Live Performance)	6:25
Total length:		23:79

== Singles ==
- "Eden" (1998)
- "Deliver Me" (1999)
- "So Many Things" (1999)
- "The Last Words You Said" (1999)
- "Dust in the Wind" (1999)

== Charts ==
Weekly chart performance for Eden
Chart (1998–99)	Peak position
Austrian Albums (Ö3 Austria)	9
Canada Top Albums/CDs (RPM)	10
Danish Albums (Hitlisten)	10
Dutch Albums (Album Top 100)	43
Finnish Albums (Suomen virallinen lista)	13
German Albums (Offizielle Top 100)	34
New Zealand Albums (RMNZ)	6
Norwegian Albums (VG-lista)	6
Swedish Albums (Sverigetopplistan)	2
US Billboard 200	65
US Top Classical Albums (Billboard)	1

== Certifications ==
Region	Certification	Certified units/sales
Argentina (CAPIF)	Gold	30,000^{^}
Brazil (Pro-Música Brasil)	Gold	100,000^{*}
Canada (Music Canada)	Platinum	100,000^{^}
Denmark (IFPI Danmark)	Platinum	50,000^{^}
Norway (IFPI Norway)	Platinum	50,000^{*}
Sweden (GLF)	Platinum	80,000^{^}
South Korea	—	38,878
United States (RIAA)	Gold	500,000^{^}
^{*} Sales figures based on certification alone.^{^} Shipments figures based on certification alone.
