= Gordon Sandison (baritone) =

Scottish operatic baritone

George Sandison (3 August 1949 – 3 December 2018) was a Scottish operatic baritone known for his roles in Mozart operas, among others.

Born in Aberdeen, Sandison started his studies at the Glasgow College of Dramatic Art where he received his diploma in speech and drama. A James Caird scholarship enabled him to study music at the Royal Scottish Academy of Music; he then received a bursary to study abroad.

Sandison sang more than 30 roles for the Scottish Opera where he made his debut in 1972. He also appeared for Opera North, Kent Opera, Glyndebourne, Wexford Festival, and in several Gilbert and Sullivan roles at New Sadler's Wells Opera and on BBC television broadcasts. He made his debut at the Royal Opera House in 1984. In later years, he taught voice.
