= Deliver Me (song) =

Single by Sarah Brightman

from the album Eden
- Released: 1999
- Studio: Nemo Studios (Hamburg, Germany); Nemo Studios (London, England); Angel Recording Studios (London, England); Bal Harbour Studios (Miami, FL); Abbey Road Studios (London, England); The Oxford Church
- Genre: Classical crossover
- Songwriter(s): Helena Marsh & Jon Marsh
- Producer(s): Frank Peterson

Sarah Brightman singles chronology
"Eden" (1998)	"Deliver Me" (1999)	"So Many Things" (1999)

Alternative cover
- Benefit CD

"Deliver Me" is a song originally released by The Beloved in 1996. In 1998, Sarah Brightman covered the song for her album Eden. It was a European only single. A second version was released as a charity single in aid of the 1999 Chi-Chi earthquake victims.

== Track listing ==
=== European CD ===
1. "Deliver Me"
2. "Dust in the Wind"

=== Taiwan Benefit CD ===
1. "Deliver Me"
2. "Nella Fantasia"
3. "Deliver Me" (CD-ROM Video)

== Cover versions ==
- The Christian rock band David Crowder Band covered the song on their 2003 album Illuminate.
- Sister Bliss (of Faithless fame) covered the song as a single in 2001 in numerous countries, reaching No. 31 in the UK singles chart. It also featured backing vocals and guitar from folk hero John Martyn.

== Uses in other media ==
The song was used at the ending of the 1999 film Brokedown Palace.

A cover of the song was used in a New Zealand television advert for Steinlager beer
