= Pie Jesu =

Text from the "Dies irae" often used in music

"Pie Jesu" (/ˈpiː.eɪ ˈjeɪ.zuː, -suː/ PEE-ay-YAY-zu; original Latin: "Pie Iesu" /ˈpi.e ˈje.su/) is a text from the Lacrimosa, a hymn in the sequence "Dies irae," where it is the final (nineteenth) couplet. The couplet is often included in musical settings of the Requiem Mass as a motet. The phrase means "pious Jesus" in the vocative.

== Popular settings ==
The settings of the Requiem Mass by Marc-Antoine Charpentier (H.234, H.263, H.269, H.427), Luigi Cherubini, Antonin Dvořák, Gabriel Fauré, Maurice Duruflé, John Rutter, Karl Jenkins, Kim André Arnesen and Fredrik Sixten include a "Pie Jesu" as an independent movement. Decidedly, the best known is the "Pie Jesu" from Fauré's Requiem. Camille Saint-Saëns, who died in 1921, said of Fauré's "Pie Jesu": "Just as Mozart's is the only 'Ave verum corpus', this is the only 'Pie Jesu'."

Andrew Lloyd Webber's setting of "Pie Jesu" in his Requiem (1985) has also become well known and has been widely recorded, including by Sarah Brightman, Charlotte Church, Jackie Evancho, Sissel Kyrkjebø, Ylvis, Marie Osmond, Anna Netrebko, Lucy Thomas (as a duet with her sister Martha Thomas), Malakai Bayoh and others. Performed by Sarah Brightman and Paul Miles-Kingston, it was a certified Silver hit in the UK in 1985.

== In popular culture ==
The couplet is chanted by a group of flagellant monks as a running gag during the 1975 film Monty Python and the Holy Grail.

== Text ==
The original text, derived from the "Dies irae" sequence, is as follows: (Note: Pie is the vocative of the word pius ("pious", "dutiful to one's parent or God"). "Jesu" (Iesu in Latin) is the vocative of Jesus/Iesus. Requiem is the accusative of requies ("rest"), sometimes mistranslated as "peace", although that would be pacem, as in Dona nobis pacem ("Give us peace").)

Pie Jesu Domine,
Dona eis requiem. (×2)

Pie Jesu Domine,
Dona eis requiem sempiternam.

Pious Lord Jesus,
Give them rest.

Pious Lord Jesus,
Give them everlasting rest.

=== Andrew Lloyd Webber's Requiem text ===
Andrew Lloyd Webber, in his Requiem, combined the text of the "Pie Jesu" with the version of the "Agnus Dei" from the Tridentine Requiem Mass:

Pie Jesu, (×4)
Qui tollis peccata mundi,
Dona eis requiem. (×2)

Agnus Dei, (×4)
Qui tollis peccata mundi,
Dona eis requiem, (×2)
Sempiternam (×2)
Requiem.

Pious Jesus,
Who takes away the sins of the world,
Give them rest.

Lamb of God,
Who takes away the sins of the world,
Give them rest,
Everlasting
Rest.

== Notes and references ==
References
