= Nella fantasia =

Song by Sarah Brightman
- Language: Italian
- English title: In My Fantasy
- Published: 1998
- Composer: Ennio Morricone
- Lyricist: Chiara Ferraù

"Nella fantasia" ("In My Fantasy") is a song sung in Italian based on the theme "Gabriel's Oboe" from the film The Mission (1986). With music by composer Ennio Morricone and lyrics by Chiara Ferraù, "Nella fantasia" is popular among classical crossover singers, and was originally released in 1998 by Sarah Brightman. It has since been covered by many artists.

== Origin ==
"Nella fantasia" first appeared on the Sarah Brightman album Eden (1998). A music video for the song was released on Brightman's Diva: The Video Collection in 2006. On the March 1999 video recording of her concert One Night in Eden, when introducing the song, she said:

My next song was originally an instrumental written by the composer Ennio Morricone for the film The Mission. About three years ago I wrote to Mr. Morricone, asking whether he would give me permission to turn this particular piece into a song. He flatly refused. So every two months I would send yet another begging letter, until I think he became so sick of me that he finally relented. And I am really glad that he did, because I think it works beautifully as a song.

== Lyricist ==
In the liner notes of Eden, the lyricist of the song was named as "Ferraù". In a review of a Sarah Brightman concert at the San Jose Center for the Performing Arts on September 14, 1999, Philip Anderson wrote that "'Nella Fantasia'... was inspired by an instrumental soundtrack for the film, The Mission, which Sarah had begged the composer to allow her to put lyrics to." It is possible that Brightman wrote the lyrics of the song in English and they were translated into Italian by Ferraù. Confusingly, the liner notes of Brightman's subsequent album The Very Best of 1990–2000 (2001), which also featured the song, state that the composers of the song were Berta Ferraud and Ennio Morricone.

=== Meaning ===
In English, the song means:

In my imagination I see a just world
Where all live in peace and honesty.
I dream of souls that are always free
Like clouds that soar
Full of humanity; deep in spirit.

In my imagination I see a bright world.
There even night is less dark.
I dream of souls that are always free,
Like clouds that soar.

In my imagination there is a warm wind
That breathes over the cities, like a friend.
I dream of souls that are always free,
Like clouds that soar
Full of humanity; deep in spirit.
