= Andrew Lloyd Webber discography =

This page lists notable US and UK albums, singles and compilations which feature music written by Andrew Lloyd Webber, alongside their release dates.

== Show Recordings ==
=== The Likes of Us (1965) ===
Album title	Principal Artists	Album details
The Likes of Us: Live from the Sydmonton Festival	Concert performance featuring Adam Brazier, Hannah Waddingham and Tim Rice	Released: 2005; Label: Really Useful Records; Format: CD

=== Joseph and the Amazing Technicolor Dreamcoat (1968) ===
Album title	Principal Artists	Album details
Joseph and the Amazing Technicolor Dreamcoat	Original album featuring David Daltrey and The Mixed Bag	Released: 1969; Label: Decca Records (UK); Scepter Records (US); Format: LP
Joseph and the Amazing Technicolor Dreamcoat: Original London Cast	Recording of the Young Vic production including Peter Reeves and Gary Bond	Released: 1972; Label: RSO Records; Format: LP / cassette
Joseph and the Amazing Technicolor Dreamcoat	A studio production featuring Gary Bond, Peter Reeves and Gordon Waller	Released: 1974; Label: MCA Records; Format: LP / cassette / CD; Producers: Andrew Lloyd Webber and Tim Rice
Joseph and the Amazing Technicolor Dreamcoat: Original Broadway Cast	Featuring Laurie Beechman, Bill Hutton & Gordon Stanley	Released: 1982; Label: Chrysalis Records; Format: LP / cassette / CD
Andrew Lloyd Webber's New Production of Joseph and the Amazing Technicolor Dreamcoat	Featuring the cast of the London Palladium revival production including Jason Donovan, Linzi Hateley and David Easter	Released: 1991; Label: Really Useful Records / Polydor; Format: LP / CD / Cassette; Remastered: 2005
Andrew Lloyd Webber's New Production of Joseph and the Amazing Technicolor Dreamcoat: Original Canadian Cast Recording	Featuring Donny Osmond, Janet Metz and Johnny Seaton	Released: 1992; Label: Polydor; Format: CD / Cassette
Andrew Lloyd Webber's New Production of Joseph and the Amazing Technicolor Dreamcoat: U.S. Cast	Featuring the cast of the 1993 Los Angeles production including Michael Damian, Kelli Rabke, Clifford David and Robert Torti	Released: 1993; Label: Really Useful Records / Polydor; Format: CD / Cassette
Joseph and the Amazing Technicolor Dreamcoat: Original Soundtrack Album	Featuring the cast of the video production including Donny Osmond, Maria Friedman, Robert Torti and Richard Attenborough	Released: 1999; Label: Really Useful Records; Format: CD / cassette
Joseph and the Amazing Technicolor Dreamcoat	US Tour Cast Recording featuring Patrick Cassidy and Amy Adams	Released: 2005; Label: Format:
Joseph and the Amazing Technicolor Dreamcoat	UK Tour Cast Recording featuring Craig Chalmers, Abigail Jaye, Henry Metcalfe and Simon Bowman	Released: 2009; Label: Format:

=== Jesus Christ Superstar (1970) ===
Album title	Principal Artists	Album details
Jesus Christ Superstar	Ian Gillan, Murray Head and Yvonne Elliman	Released: 1970; Label: MCA Records; Format: Double LP / Double Cassette / Double CD
Jesus Christ Superstar: A Decca Broadway Original Cast Album	Original Broadway Cast including Jeff Fenholt, Ben Vereen and Yvonne Elliman	Released: 1971; Label: Decca; Format:
Jesus Christ Superstar: Original London Cast	Original London Cast including Paul Nicholas, Stephen Tate and Dana Gillespie	Released: 1972; Label: Format:
Jesus Christ Superstar: Original Australian Cast Recording	Original Australian Cast including Trevor White, Jon English and Michele Fawdon	Released: 1972; Label: Format:
Jesus Christ Superstar: The Original Motion Picture Soundtrack Album	Ted Neely, Yvonne Elliman and Carl Anderson	Released: 1973; Label: Format:
Jesucristo Superstar: Original versión española	Producción Nacho Artime y Jaime Azpilicueta. Featuring Camilo Sesto (Jesús), Ángela Carrasco (María Magdalena) & Teddy Bautista (Júdas)	Released: 1975; Label: Format:
Jesus Christ Superstar: The Album - 1992 Australian Cast Recording Highlights	John Farnham, Jon Stevens, Kate Ceberano	Released: 1992; Label: Format:
Jesus Christ Superstar: The 20th Anniversary London Cast Recording	Paul Nicholas, Keith Burns and Claire Moore	Released: 1992; Label: Format:
Jesus Christ Superstar: The Album - New Zealand Cast Recording Highlights	Darryl Lovegrove, Jay Laga'aia and Margaret Urlich	Released: 1994; Label: Format:
Jesus Christ Superstar	Featuring the Jay Records studio cast including Dave Willetts, Clive Rowe and Issy van Randwyck	Released: 1995; Label: Format:
Jesus Christ Superstar	1996 London Cast including Steve Balsamo, Joanna Ampil & Zubin Varla	Released: 1996; Label: Really Useful Records / Polydor; Format: CD / Cassette
Highlights from Jesus Christ Superstar	1996 London Cast including Steve Balsamo, Joanna Ampil & Zubin Varla	Released: 1996; Label: Really Useful Records / Polydor; Format: Double CD / Double Cassette
Jesus Christ Superstar: A New Stage Production Soundtrack	Video cast including Glenn Carter, Jérôme Pradon and Renee Castle	Released: 2000; Label: Really Useful Records / Sony Classical; Format: CD
Jesus Christ Superstar Live in Concert	NBC broadcast cast including John Legend, Sara Bareilles, Brandon Victor Dixon and Alice Cooper	Released: 2018; Label: Format:

=== Jeeves (1975) / By Jeeves (1996) ===
Album title	Principal Artists	Album details
Jeeves: Original London Cast	Original London Cast including David Hemmings and Michael Aldridge	Released: 1974; Label: Format:
By Jeeves: Original Cast Recording	Original London Cast including Steven Pacey and Malcolm Sinclair	Released: 1996; Label: Really Useful Records / Polydor; Format: CD / Cassette
By Jeeves: American Premier Recording	Video production cast including John Scherer and Martin Jarvis	Released: 2001; Label: Format:

=== Evita (1976) ===
Album title	Principal Artists	Album details	Notes
Evita: An Opera Based on the Life Story of Eva Perón 1919 - 1952	Julie Covington, C. T. Wilkinson, Paul Jones and Barbara Dickson	Released: 1976; Label: MCA Records; Format: Double LP / Double Cassette / Double CD; Remastered: 1996	A 1996 digital remaster was released on double CD as the 20th Anniversary Edition with a silver jewel case.
Evita: Original London Cast Recording	Original London Cast including Elaine Paige, David Essex, Joss Ackland and Siobhan McCarthy	Released: 1978; Label: MCA Records; Format: LP / Cassette / CD	
Evita: Premiere American Recording	Original Broadway Cast including Patti LuPone, Mandy Patinkin and Bob Gunton	Released: 1979; Label: MCA Records; Format: Double LP / Double Cassette / Double CD	
Evita	International Tour Cast including Florence Lacey, James Sbano and Robert Alton	Released: 1989; Label: Polydor; Format: CD	
Evita: The Complete Motion Picture Soundtrack	Soundtrack of the film featuring Madonna, Antonio Banderas, Jonathan Pryce and Jimmy Nail	Released: 1996; Label: Warner Bros Records; Format: Double CD / Double Cassette	
Evita: Music from the Motion Picture	Soundtrack of the film featuring Madonna, Antonio Banderas, Jonathan Pryce and Jimmy Nail	Released: 1996; Label: Warner Bros Records; Format: CD / Cassette	
Evita: 2006 London Cast Recording	2006 London Cast including Elena Roger, Matt Rawle and Philip Quast	Released: 2006; Label: Really Useful Records / Polydor; Format: CD	
Evita: New Broadway Cast Recording	2012 Broadway Cast including Ricky Martin, Elena Roger and Michael Cerveris	Released: 2012; Label: Masterworks Broadway; Format: Double CD	

=== Tell Me On A Sunday (1979) ===
Album title	Artist	Album details
Tell Me on a Sunday	Marti Webb	Released: 1980; Label: Polydor; Format: LP / Cassette / CD
Andrew Lloyd Webber and Don Black's Tell Me on a Sunday	Denise Van Outen	Released: 2003; Label: Really Useful Records / Polydor; Format: CD

=== Cats (1981) ===
Album title	Principal Artists	Album details
Cats: Original Cast Recording	Original London Cast including Elaine Paige, Brian Blessed, Sarah Brightman and Paul Nicholas	Released: 1981; Label: Polydor / Really Useful Records (UK and international); Geffen Records (North America); Format: Double LP / Double Cassette / Double CD; Remastered: 1998
Highlights from Cats	Original London Cast including Elaine Paige, Brian Blessed, Sarah Brightman and Paul Nicholas	Released: 1989; Label: Polydor / Really Useful Records; Format: LP / Cassette / CD
Cats: Complete Original Broadway Cast Recording	Original Broadway Cast including Betty Buckley, Ken Page, Harry Groener & Terrance Mann	Released: 1983; Label: Geffen Records (original release); Polydor / Really Useful Records (reissues); Format: double LP; double CD; double cassette; Remastered: 2005
Cats: Selections from the Original Broadway Cast Recording	Original Broadway Cast including Betty Buckley, Ken Page, Harry Groener & Terrance Mann	Released: 1983; Label: Geffen Records (original issue); Polydor / Really Useful Records (reissue); Format: LP / Cassette / CD
Cats: Original Australian Cast Recording	Original Australian Cast including Debbie Byrne, John Wood & Grant Smith	Released: 1985; Label: EMI; Format: double LP; double cassette; double CD
Cats: Highlights from the Motion Picture Soundtrack	Film adaptation cast including James Corden, Judi Dench, Jason Derulo, Jennifer Hudson, Ian McKellen and Taylor Swift	Released: 2019; Label: Polydor (international); Republic Records (US); Format: CD; digital

=== Song and Dance (1982) ===
Album title	Principal Artists	Album details
Song & Dance: Original Cast Recording	Original London Cast: Marti Webb and Wayne Sleep	Released: 1982; Label: Polydor; Format: Double LP / Double Cassette / Double CD; Remastered: 2005
Song & Dance	Video cast: Sarah Brightman and Wayne Sleep	Released: 1984; Label: Polydor; Format: Remastered: 2005
Song & Dance: The Songs	Original Broadway Cast: Bernadette Peters	Released: 1985; Label: Format:

=== Starlight Express (1984) ===
Album title	Principal Artists	Album details
Starlight Express: The Original Cast Recording	Original London Cast including Lon Satton as Papa, Ray Shell as Rusty and Stephanie Lawrence as Pearl	Released: 1984; Label: Format: Double LP / Double Cassette / Double CD; Remastered: 2005
Music and Songs from Starlight Express		Released: 1987; Label: Format:
Starlight Express	Touring cast	Released: 1987; Label: Format:
The New Starlight Express	1992 revised London production cast including Lon Satton as Papa, Greg Ellis as Rusty and Reva Rice as Pearl	Released: 1993; Label: Really Useful Records / Polydor; Format: CD / Cassette / DCC; Remastered: 2007

=== The Phantom of the Opera (1986) ===
Album title	Principal Artists	Album details
The Phantom of the Opera: Original Cast Recording	Original London Cast including Michael Crawford, Sarah Brightman and Steve Barton	Released: 1986; Label: Polydor; Format: Double LP / Double Cassette / Double CD; Remastered: 2001
Highlights from Andrew Lloyd Webber's The Phantom of the Opera: Original Canadian Cast	Original Toronto Cast including Colm Wilkinson, Rebecca Caine and Byron Nease	Released: 1989; Label: Polydor; Format: LP / Cassette / CD
The Phantom of the Opera: The Original Motion Picture Soundtrack	Single disc album featuring the cast of the movie including Gerard Butler as The Phantom, Emmy Rossum as Christine and Patrick Wilson as Raoul	Released: 2004; Label: Sony Classical; Format: CD
The Phantom of the Opera: The Original Motion Picture Soundtrack - Special Edition	Double album featuring the cast of the movie including Gerard Butler as The Phantom, Emmy Rossum as Christine and Patrick Wilson as Raoul	Released: 2004; Label: Sony Classical; Format: Double CD
The Phantom of the Opera at the Royal Albert Hall	Live recording of a concert to celebrate the 25th anniversary of the London opening featuring Ramin Karimloo, Sierra Boggess and Hadley Fraser	Released: 2011; Label: Format:

=== Aspects of Love (1989) ===
Album title	Principal Artists	Album details
Aspects of Love: Original Cast Recording	Original London Cast including Ann Crumb, Michael Ball, Diana Morrison and Kevin Colson	Released: 1989; Label: Really Useful Records / Polydor; Format: Double LP / Double Cassette / Double CD; Remastered: 2005

=== Sunset Boulevard (1993) ===
Album title	Principal Artists	Album details	Notes
Sunset Boulevard: World Premiere Recording	Original London cast including Patti LuPone, Kevin Anderson, Daniel Benzali and Meredith Braun	Released: 1993; Label: Really Useful Records / Polydor; Format: Double CD / Double Cassette; Remastered: 2007	A number of the backing tracks had been pre-recorded for the 1992 Sydmonton Festival performance and therefore differed from the versions as they would have been played live at the theatre.
Sunset Boulevard: American Premiere Recording	Original Los Angeles cast including Glenn Close, Alan Campbell, George Hearn and Judy Kuhn	Released: 1994; Label: Really Useful Records / Polydor; Format: Double CD / Double Cassette; Remastered: 2005	Close, Campbell and Hearn would later reprise their roles when the show opened on Broadway and therefore this functioned as the Broadway cast recording despite not having technically been so.
Sunset Boulevard: American Premiere Recording Highlights	Original Los Angeles cast including Glenn Close, Alan Campbell, George Hearn and Judy Kuhn	Released: 1994; Label: Really Useful Records / Polydor; Format: CD / Cassette	Close, Campbell and Hearn would later reprise their roles when the show opened on Broadway and therefore this functioned as the Broadway cast recording despite not having technically been so.
Sunset Boulevard: Original Canadian Cast Recording	Toronto cast including Diahann Carroll, Rex Smith and Walter Charles	Released: 1995; Label: Format:	
New Ways to Dream: Songs from Sunset Boulevard	Betty Buckley	Released: 1995; Label: Really Useful Records / Polygram; Format: CD	
Sunset Boulevard: Deutsche Originalaufnahme	Original German Cast including Helen Schneider and Uwe Kröger	Released: 1996; Label: Format:	
Songs from Sunset Boulevard	Petula Clark	Released: 1996; Label: Really Useful Records / Polydor; Format: CD / Cassette	A three-track EP released to coincide with Clark taking over the role in the London production
Songs from Andrew Lloyd Webber's Sunset Boulevard	Faith Brown & Earl Carpenter	Released: 2001; Label: Really Useful Records / Polydor; Format: CD	A three-track EP released for sale at venues of the first UK touring production. Brown and Carpenter performed to the backing tracks that had been originally recorded in advance of Sunset Boulevard: World Premiere Recording. David Caddick, the show's Production Musical Director produced the vocal performances.

=== Whistle Down the Wind (1996) ===
Album title	Principal Artists	Album details	Notes
Songs from Whistle Down the Wind	Tom Jones, Tina Arena, Boyzone, Elaine Paige, Donny Osmond, The Everly Brothers, Meat Loaf, Boy George, Sounds of Blackness, Bonnie Tyler, Michael Ball and Lottie Mayor	Released: 1998; Label: Really Useful Records / Polydor; Format: CD / Cassette	A studio recording of songs from the show made to promote the original London production.
Whistle Down the Wind: Original Cast Recording	Original London cast including Marcus Lovett, Lottie Mayor and James Graeme	Released: 1998; Label: Really Useful Records / Polydor; Format: Double CD / Double Cassette	

=== The Beautiful Game (2000) ===
Album title	Principal Artists	Album details
The Beautiful Game: Original Cast Recording	Original London Cast including Josie Walker, Hannah Waddingham and Ben Goddard	Released: 2000; Label: Really Useful Records / Telstar; Format: CD

=== The Woman in White (2004) ===
Album title	Principal Artists	Album details	Notes
The Woman in White: Original Cast Recording	Original London Cast including Martin Crewes, Maria Friedman and Michael Crawford	Released: 2000; Label: Really Useful Records / Telstar; Format: CD	Mostly recorded live with some re-recording and overdubs.

=== Love Never Dies (2010) ===
Album title	Principal Artists	Album details	Notes
Andrew Lloyd Webber's Love Never Dies	Ramin Karimloo, Sierra Boggess and Joseph Millson	Released: 2010; Label: Really Useful Records / Polydor; Format: Double CD	A concept album recorded prior to the original London production.
Andrew Lloyd Webber's Love Never Dies	Ben Lewis and Anna O'Byrne	Released: 2018; Label: Format:	A studio production

=== The Wizard of Oz (2011) ===
Album title	Principal Artists	Album details
The Wizard of Oz: 2011 London Palladium Recording	Original London Cast including Danielle Hope, Hannah Waddingham and Michael Crawford	Released: 2011; Label: Really Useful Records / Polydor; Format: CD

=== Stephen Ward (2013) ===
Album title	Principal Artists	Album details
Stephen Ward: Original Cast Recording	Original London Cast including Alexander Hanson, Charlotte Spencer and Charlotte Blackledge	Released: 2013; Label: Decca; Format: CD

=== School of Rock (2015) ===
Album title	Principal Artists	Album details
School of Rock: Original Cast Recording	Original Broadway Cast including Alex Brightman and Sierra Boggess	Released: 2015; Label: Warner Bros Records; Format: CD / Double LP

=== Cinderella (2021) ===
Album title	Principal Artists	Album details
Cinderella	Original London Cast starring Carrie Hope Fletcher	Released: 2021; Label: Polydor; Format: CD / LP / Cassette / Digital

== Standalone albums ==
Album title	Artist	Album details	Notes
Variations	Andrew Lloyd Webber	Released: 1978; Label: Format:	Variations on a theme by Niccolo Paganini for cello and rock band, featuring Julian Lloyd Webber, Barbara Thompson, Rod Argent and Colosseum II featuring Gary Moore. Lloyd Webber wrote and arranged the music, as well as producing the album.
Won't Change Places	Marti Webb	Released: 1980; Label: Really Useful Records / Polydor; Format: LP / Cassette	Lloyd Webber was the Executive Producer as well as writing and producing a number of the tracks.
Requiem	Andrew Lloyd Webber	Released: 1985; Label: Format:	Lloyd Webber's setting of the Latin requiem mass featuring vocalists Plácido Domingo and Sarah Brightman, and conducted by Lorin Maazel. Lloyd Webber wrote the music.
Surrender: The Unexpected Songs	Sarah Brightman	Released: 1996; Label: Really Useful Records / Polydor; Format: CD / Cassette	

== Live recordings ==
Album title	Artists	Album details	Notes
Andrew Lloyd Webber - Masterpiece		Released: 2002; Label: Eagle Records; Format: CD	A live recording of a concert at the Great Hall Of The People, Beijing, featuring Elaine Paige, Kris Phillips, Tony Vincent and Sandy Lam

== Singles ==
Title	B-Side	Artist	Year	Label	Notes
"Down Thru' Summer"	"I'll Give All My Love to Southend"	Ross Hannaman	1967	Columbia	
"1969"	"Probably On Thursday"	Ross Hannaman	1967	Columbia	
"Believe Me I Will"		Sacha Distel	1968		
"'Til Tomorrow"	"Try It and See"	Rita Pavone	1969		"Try It and See" written by Lloyd Webber and Rice
"Come Back Richard Your Country Needs You"		Tim Rice and the Webber Group	1969		
"Goodbye Seattle"	"Wait for Me"	Paul Raven now known as Gary Glitter	1970	MCA Records	Produced by Mike Leander, Tim Rice and Andrew Lloyd Webber. The B-side was written by Leander.
"What A Line to Go Out On"	"Interlude for Johnny"	Yvonne Elliman	1972	Polydor	Produced by Tim Rice and Andrew Lloyd Webber. The B-side was written by Elliman. Both tracks were taken from her album Yvonne Elliman, released in the UK and Japan as I Don't Know How to Love Him.
"Disillusion Me"		Gary Bond	1973		
"Christmas Dream"	"Marisa"	Maynard Williams	1974	MCA Records	
"Christmas Dream"	"Lonely Without You"	Maynard Williams	1974	MCA Records	
"Don't Cry for Me Argentina"	"Rainbow High"	Julie Covington	1977	MCA Records	Taken from the album Evita: An Opera Based on the Life Story of Eva Perón 1919 - 1952
"Another Suitcase in Another Hall"	"Requiem for Evita"	Barbara Dickson	1977	MCA Records	Taken from the album Evita: An Opera Based on the Life Story of Eva Perón 1919 - 1952
"Magdalena"	"Half A Moment"	Tony Christie featuring Dana Gillespie	1977	MCA Records	"Magdalena" was written by Lloyd Webber and Tim Rice. "Half A Moment" was a song from Lloyd Webber's 1974 production Jeeves with lyrics by Alan Ayckbourn.
"On This Night of a Thousand Stars"	"Bewitched"	Tony Christie	1977	MCA Records	The A-side was written and produced by Andrew Lloyd Webber and Tim Rice, with orchestration by Lloyd Webber. The B-side was written by Richard Rodgers and Lorenz Hart, arranged by Ian Green and produced by Ray Singer.
"Take That Look Off Your Face"	"Sheldon Bloom"	Marti Webb	1980	Really Useful Records, Polydor	Music by Andrew Lloyd Webber and lyrics by Don Black. Produced by Andrew Lloyd Webber. Taken from Webb's album Tell Me on a Sunday.
"Tell Me on a Sunday"	"You Made Me Think You Were in Love"	Marti Webb	1980	Really Useful Records, Polydor	Music by Andrew Lloyd Webber and lyrics by Don Black. Produced by Andrew Lloyd Webber. Taken from Webb's album Tell Me on a Sunday.
"Your Ears Should Be Burning Now"	"Nothing Like You've Ever Known"	Marti Webb	1980	Really Useful Records, Polydor	A-side written by Don Black and Tony MacAulay, and produced by MacAulay with executive production by Lloyd Webber. B-side by Andrew Lloyd Webber and Don Black, with arrangement and production by Lloyd Webber. The A-side was taken from Webb's album Won't Change Places and the B-side from her previous album Tell Me on a Sunday.
"I've Been in Love Too Long"	"I Won't Change Places"	Marti Webb	1980	Really Useful Records, Polydor	Music by Andrew Lloyd Webber and lyrics by Don Black. Produced by Andrew Lloyd Webber. A-side arranged by Lloyd Webber. B-side arranged by Lloyd Webber and David Cullen. Taken from Webb's album Won't Change Places.
"Unexpected Song"	"Angry and Sore"	Marti Webb and Justin Hayward	1981	Really Useful Records, Polydor	A-side written by Lloyd Webber and Don Black, and produced by Lloyd Webber. B-side written and produced by Rod Argent, and taken from the album Won't Change Places
"Memory - Theme from the musical Cats"	"The Lost Variation"	Andrew Lloyd Webber	1981	MCA Records	
"Memory"	"The Overture from Cats"	Elaine Paige	1981	Really Useful Records, Polydor	Music by Andrew Lloyd Webber and lyrics by Trevor Nunn after T. S. Eliot. Taken from the album Cats: Original Cast Recording
"Memory"	"Evergreen (Love Theme From A Star Is Born)"	Barbra Streisand	1982	Columbia	
"The Last Man in My Life"	"Come Back With the Same Look in Your Eyes"	Marti Webb	1982	Polydor	
"The Phantom of the Opera"	"Overture - The Phantom of the Opera"	Steve Harley and Sarah Brightman	1986	Polydor	
"The Music of the Night"	"Wishing You Were Somehow Here Again"	Michael Crawford, Sarah Brightman	1986	Polydor	Double A-Side
"All I Ask of You"	"The Phantom of the Opera Overture - Act II"	Cliff Richard and Sarah Brightman	1986	Polydor	
"Love Changes Everything"	"Aspects of Aspects"	Michael Ball	1989	Polydor	
"Anything But Lonely"	"Half a Moment" "What Makes Him Love Me?" "English Girls"	Sarah Brightman	1989	Polydor	
"The First Man You Remember"	"Mermaid Song"; "Love Changes Everything"	Michael Ball and Diana Morrison	1989	Polydor	
"Any Dream Will Do"		Jason Donovan	1991	Polydor	
"Close Every Door"		Phillip Schofield	1992	Polydor	
"Amigos Para Siempre (Friends for Life)"	Opening Ceremony Barcelona 1992 Games; "Amigos Para Siempre (Friends for Life)"	José Carreras and Sarah Brightman	1992	Polydor	
"Tetris"	"Play Game Boy"	Doctor Spin	1992	Polydor, Carpet Records	Arranged by Lloyd Webber with Nigel Wright, collaborating under the name Doctor Spin
"Next Time You Fall in Love"	"Make Up My Heart"	Reva Rice and Greg Ellis	1993	Polydor	
"Sunset Boulevard"	"Sunset Boulevard Symphonic Mix"	Michael Ball	1993	Polydor	
"The Perfect Year"		Dina Carroll	1993	A&M Records	
"With One Look"	"Memory"	Barbra Streisand	1993	Columbia	
"As If We Never Said Goodbye"	"Guilty"	Barbra Streisand	1994	Columbia	
"As If We Never Said Goodbye"	"Out Here On My Own"; "For You"	Elaine Paige	1995	WEA	
"Don't Cry for Me Argentina"	"Santa Evita"; "Latin Chant"	Madonna	1996	Warner Bros. Records, WEA	Co-produced by Lloyd Webber, Wright, Alan Parker and David Caddick
"You Must Love Me"	"Rainbow High"	Madonna	1996	Warner Bros. Records, WEA	Co-produced by Lloyd Webber, Wright, Alan Parker and David Caddick
"Another Suitcase in Another Hall"	"Don't Cry for Me Argentina" [Miami Mix Edit]; You Must Love Me; Hello and Goodbye	Madonna	1997	Warner Bros. Records, WEA	Co-produced by Lloyd Webber, Wright, Alan Parker and David Caddick
"Whistle Down the Wind"	"The Perfect Year"; "The Jellicle Ball"	Tina Arena	1998	Really Useful Records, Polydor	"The Perfect Year" is performed by Glenn Close; "The Jellicle Ball" is taken from the then forthcoming video version of Cats
"No Matter What"	"Father and Son"; "Words"	Boyzone	1998	Polydor	
"No Matter What"	"She's the One"	Boyzone	1998	Polydor	
"A Kiss is a Terrible Thing to Waste"	"No Matter What"; "Two Out of Three Ain't Bad (live)"	Meat Loaf	1998	Virgin	
"Memory"	"As If We Never Said Goodbye"; "The Rose"	Elaine Paige	1998	WEA	Track 1 taken from the soundtrack of Cats. Music by Andrew Lloyd Webber. Text by Trevor Nunn after T. S. Eliot. Produced by Andrew Lloyd Webber and Nigel Wright. Orchestration by David Cullen and Andrew Lloyd Webber.; Track 2 taken from the 1995 album Encore. Music by Andrew Lloyd Webber. Lyrics by Don Black and Christopher Hampton with contributions by Amy Powers. Produced by Lloyd Webber and Wright. Engineered by Robin Sellars and Dave Hunt. Orchestra conducted by Michael Reed.; Track 3 taken from the 1984 album Cinema. Written by Amanda McBroom. Produced by Tony Visconti.
"Our Kind of Love"	"Our Kind of Love" - Andrew Lloyd Webber version; "The Beautiful Game Overture"	Hannah	2000	Really Useful Records, Telstar Records	Track 1 music by Andrew Lloyd Webber, lyrics by Ben Elton, mixed by Mick Guzauski, produced by Angela Lupino and Simon Franglen, executive produced by Lloyd Webber; Tracks 2 and 3 music by Lloyd Webber, lyrics by Ben Elton, engineered by Robin Sellars and produced by Lloyd Webber and Wright; Track 3 taken from the album The Beautiful Game: Original Cast Recording
"Our Kind of Love" - Nowels and Judge Mix	"Our Kind of Love" - Acoustic Version "Viva! The Beautiful Game"	Hannah	2000	Really Useful Records, Telstar Records	
"Let Us Love in Peace"		Josie Walker with the Omagh Community Youth Choir	2000		
"Any Dream Will Do"	"Close Every Door"; "Any Dream Will Do" Singalong Version	Lee Mead	2007	Really Useful Records, Polydor, Fascination	
"It's My Time"		Jade Ewen	2009	Polydor	Eurovision Song Contest 2009 entry for the UK
"Sing"		Gary Barlow	2012	Decca	Official song for the Diamond Jubilee of Queen Elizabeth II which was co-written with Gary Barlow, and performed with the Commonwealth Band and the Military Wives
"Beautiful Ghosts"		Taylor Swift	2019	Polydor	Original song for the film adaptation of Cats

== Notable songs and covers ==
Title	Artist	Album	Year	Label	Notes
"It's Easy for You"	Elvis Presley	Moody Blue	1977	RCA Records	The final track on Presley's final album.
"I Could Have Given You More"	Petula Clark	Don't Cry for Me Argentina: The CBS Years, Vol 2			
"Cold"	The Everly Brothers	Songs from Whistle Down the Wind	1998	Polydor	

== Compilations ==
Lloyd Webber's Really Useful Records which, for a number of years, had an exclusive partnership with Polydor, released a number of compilations:

- The Premiere Collection: The Best of Andrew Lloyd Webber (1988)
- Andrew Lloyd Webber: The Premiere Collection Encore (1993)
- The Very Best of Andrew Lloyd Webber (1994)
- The Very Best of Andrew Lloyd Webber: The Broadway Collection (1996)
- The Andrew Lloyd Webber Collection (1997)
- Andrew Lloyd Webber: Now & Forever [Box Set] (2001)
- Gold: The Definitive Hit Singles Collection (2001), released in the US as Gold: The Definitive Hits Collection, but with different artists performing the songs
- Divas (2006)
- Andrew Lloyd Webber 60 (2008)
- Unmasked: The Platinum Collection (2018)

Other notable compilation albums, produced by other labels, include:

- Michael Crawford Performs Andrew Lloyd Webber (1991)
- The Magic of Andrew Lloyd Webber: Performed by the Orlando Pops Orchestra (1999)
- The Music of Andrew Lloyd Webber (2011)
