= Now & Forever (Andrew Lloyd Webber album) =

Andrew Lloyd Webber: Now & Forever

Box set by Andrew Lloyd Webber
- Released: 2001
- Genre: Musical theatre
- Label: Polydor

Andrew Lloyd Webber: Now & Forever is a 2001 box set compilation album of the music of composer Andrew Lloyd Webber.

Released in 2001 and comprising five discs in total, the album's first three discs feature a selection of between three and five tracks from each of Lloyd Webber's musicals to date, roughly in chronological order. The fourth disc, entitled Hits & More, features tracks that were released as singles, and the fifth disc, The Vaults, features obscure and previously unreleased tracks.

The discs are contained in a hardback book, with copious notes on the recordings and their parent shows.

The tracks' lyricists include Tim Rice, Don Black, Richard Stilgoe, Charles Hart, Alan Ayckbourn, Christopher Hampton, Jim Steinman, Ben Elton and the poet T. S. Eliot.

== Track listing ==
=== Disc one ===
Track #	Track	Artist	Parent Show
1	Overture		Jesus Christ Superstar
2	Everything's Alright	Yvonne Elliman / Murray Head / Ian Gillan	Jesus Christ Superstar
3	I Don't Know How to Love Him	Yvonne Elliman	Jesus Christ Superstar
4	Gethsemane (I Only Want to Say)	Steve Balsamo	Jesus Christ Superstar
5	Superstar	Murray Head with the Trinidad Singers	Jesus Christ Superstar
6	Oh What a Circus / Sing You Fools	Antonio Banderas	Evita
7	I'd Be Surprisingly Good for You	Elaine Paige / Joss Ackland	Evita
8	Another Suitcase in Another Hall	Barbara Dickson	Evita
9	Don't Cry for Me Argentina	Julie Covington	Evita
10	High Flying, Adored	Mandy Patinkin / Patti LuPone	Evita
11	The Jellicle Ball		Cats
12	Memory	Elaine Paige	Cats
13	Gus: The Theatre Cat	Susan Jane Tanner / John Mills	Cats
14	Mr Mistoffelees	Paul Nicholas	Cats
15	Take That Look Off Your Face	Marti Webb	Song and Dance
16	Tell Me on a Sunday	Marti Webb	Song and Dance
17	Unexpected Song	Sarah Brightman	Song and Dance
18	Nothing Like You've Ever Known	Sarah Brightman	Song and Dance
19	Introduction		Song and Dance
20	Variations 1-4		Song and Dance

=== Disc two ===
Track #	Track	Artist	Parent Show
1	Starlight Express	El Debarge	Starlight Express
2	Crazy	Greg Ellis / Reva Rice / Caron Cardelle / Samantha Lane / Voyd	Starlight Express
3	Next Time You Fall in Love	Reva Rice / Greg Ellis	Starlight Express
4	I Am the Starlight	Lon Satton / Ray Shell	Starlight Express
5	Light at the End of the Tunnel		Starlight Express
6	Hosanna	Plácido Domingo	Requiem
7	Pie Jesu	Sarah Brightman / Paul Miles-Kingston	Requiem
8	The Phantom of the Opera	Michael Crawford / Sarah Brightman	The Phantom of the Opera
9	The Music of the Night	Michael Crawford	The Phantom of the Opera
10	All I Ask of You	Sarah Brightman / Steve Barton	The Phantom of the Opera
11	Entr'acte		The Phantom of the Opera
12	Masquerade		The Phantom of the Opera
13	Wishing You Were Somehow Here Again	Sarah Brightman	The Phantom of the Opera
14	Aspects of Aspects	Orchester der Vereinigten Buehnen Wien	Aspects of Love
15	Love Changes Everything	Michael Ball	Aspects of Love
16	Seeing is Believing	Michael Ball / Ann Crumb	Aspects of Love
17	The First Man You Remember	Kevin Colson / Diana Morrison	Aspects of Love
18	Anything But Lonely	Sarah Brightman	Aspects of Love
19	Chanson D'Enfance	Sarah Brightman	Aspects of Love

=== Disc three ===
Track #	Track	Artist	Parent Show
1	Any Dream Will Do	Jason Donovan	Joseph and the Amazing Technicolor Dreamcoat
2	Joseph's Coat	Maria Friedman / Richard Attenborough / Donny Osmond	Joseph and the Amazing Technicolor Dreamcoat
3	Close Every Door	Donny Osmond	Joseph and the Amazing Technicolor Dreamcoat
4	Travel Hopefully	John Scherer / Martin Jarvis / Don Stephenson	By Jeeves
5	When Love Arrives	Steven Pacey / Diana Morrison	By Jeeves
6	Half a Moment	Sarah Brightman	By Jeeves
7	With One Look	Glenn Close	Sunset Boulevard
8	New Ways to Dream	Glenn Close / Alan Campbell	Sunset Boulevard
9	The Perfect Year	Patti LuPone / Kevin Anderson	Sunset Boulevard
10	Sunset Boulevard	Alan Campbell	Sunset Boulevard
11	As If We Never Said Goodbye	Glenn Close	Sunset Boulevard
12	Whistle Down the Wind	James Graeme / Lottie Mayor	Whistle Down the Wind
13	Cold	The Everly Brothers	Whistle Down the Wind
14	No Matter What		Whistle Down the Wind
15	The Nature of the Beast	Marcus Lovett / Lottie Mayor	Whistle Down the Wind
16	Overture		The Beautiful Game
17	The Beautiful Game		The Beautiful Game
18	Our Kind of Love	Hannah Waddingham	The Beautiful Game
19	Don't Like You	Josie Walker / David Shannon	The Beautiful Game
20	Let Us Love in Peace	Josie Walker / Omagh Youth Community Choir	The Beautiful Game

=== Disc four: Hits & More ===
Track #	Track	Artist
1	Oh What a Circus	David Essex
2	Memory	Betty Buckley
3	The Phantom of the Opera	Sarah Brightman / Steve Harley
4	All I Ask of You	Sarah Brightman / Cliff Richard
5	Love Changes Everything	Michael Ball
6	Any Dream Will Do	Donny Osmond
7	Amigos Para Siempre (Friends for Life)	Sarah Brightman / Jose Carreras
8	As If We Never Said Goodbye	Barbra Streisand
9	The Perfect Year	Dina Carroll
10	With One Look	Petula Clark
11	You Must Love Me	Madonna
12	The Heart is Slow to Learn	Kiri Te Kanawa
13	A Kiss is a Terrible Thing to Waste	The Metal Philharmonic Orchestra
14	Whistle Down the Wind	Tina Arena
15	No Matter What	Boyzone
16	The Vaults of Heaven	Tom Jones with Sounds of Blackness
17	Try Not to Be Afraid	Boy George
18	Pie Jesu	Charlotte Church

=== Disc five ===
Track #	Track	Artist
1	Make Believe Love	Wes Sands
2	Down Thru' Summer	Ross Hannaman
3	I'll Give All My Love to Southend	Ross Hannaman
4	Believe Me I Will	Sacha Distel
5	Joseph and the Amazing Technicolor Dreamcoat (1969 Radio Luxembourg Commercial)	Joseph Consortium / Pete Murray
6	Try It and See	Rita Pavone
7	Come Back Richard Your Country Needs You	Tim Rice and the Webber Group
8	Goodbye Seattle	Paul Raven
9	John 19:41	The Andrew Lloyd Webber Orchestra
10	What A Line to Go Out On	Yvonne Elliman
11	Disillusion Me	Gary Bond
12	The Ballad of Robert and Peter	Tim Rice
13	Christmas Dream	Maynard Williams
14	It's Only Your Lover Returning / All Through My Crazy and Wild Days / Don't Cry for Me Argentina	Julie Covington
15	Magdalena	Tony Christie
16	Buenos Aires	The Rioja Rockers
17	Pollicle Dogs and Jellicle Cats	Andrew Lloyd Webber
18	Mungojerrie and Rumpleteazer (Live at the Sydmonton Festival 1980)	Gemma Craven
19	I Could Have Given You More	Petula Clark
20	I've Been in Love Too Long	Marti Webb
21	Benedicite	The Stephen Hill Singers

== Personnel ==
Compiled and produced by Tristram Penna

Cover drawing by Ronnie Wood

Booklet notes by James Inverne

Special thanks: Don Black, Brian Drutman, Tracey Connolly, Richard Gates, Paul Jones, George McManus, Denis McNamara, Tim Rice, Dave Robinson, Paul Tucker and Clare Wood

Digitally remastered at Abbey Road Studios by Chris Blair and Tristram Penna

Designed by Dewynters
