= Nosferatu The Vampire (musical) =

- Concept album art
- Music: Bernard J. Taylor (Arr. by Roy Penfold, Gareth Price & Martin Smith)
- Lyrics: Bernard J. Taylor
- Basis: Nosferatu by Friedrich Wilhelm Murnau

Nosferatu the Vampire is a rock opera musical by Bernard J. Taylor inspired by the 1922 silent film by Friedrich Wilhelm Murnau, which in-turn is based on Dracula by Bram Stoker.

It was first recorded as a concept studio recording with singers including Peter Karrie, Claire Moore, Barry James (the West End's longest-running Thénardier in Les Misérables), Mario Frangoulis (Raoul in The Phantom of the Opera, 1988–89, 1991), Simon Burke and others.

It received its world premiere at the Madison Theatre, Peoria, Illinois in 1994, followed by a production at the Hippodrome, Eastbourne, England, shortly afterwards. The opera/musical has since been translated into German, Spanish and Hungarian and was due to receive its Continental European premiere in Budapest in October, 2007.

== Original Concept Album Cast ==
- Peter Karrie as Nosferatu
- Claire Moore as Mina
- Mario Frangoulis as Jonathan Harker
- Barry James as Renfield
- Mark Wynter as Van Helsing
- Simon Burke as the Innkeeper
- Annalene Beechey as Lucy
