= Pride and Prejudice (musical) =

- Music: Bernard J. Taylor
- Lyrics: Bernard J. Taylor
- Book: Bernard J. Taylor
- Basis: Jane Austen's novel Pride and Prejudice
- Productions: 1993 Peoria

Pride and Prejudice is a musical by Bernard J. Taylor based on Jane Austen's 1813 novel Pride and Prejudice. It was first produced as a concept studio recording in London, England, with singers including Peter Karrie, Claire Moore, Christopher Biggins, and others. It received its world premiere at the Madison Theatre, Peoria, Illinois in 1993, and by 2007 had received more than 20 productions worldwide, including Britain, Germany, Australia and New Zealand.

== Musical numbers ==
- "Overture"
- "See Him Today"
- "No Designs On Love"
- "Five Daughters"
- "At The Ball Tonight"
- "Assembly Waltz"
- "Being Here With You"
- "Pride and Prejudice"
- "A Man Who's Proud and Vain"
- "Isn't It Strange"
- "A Woman Who Knows Her Place"
- "Through the Eyes of a Child"
- "An Offer I Must Refuse"
- "Good Breeding"
- "Don't Ask Me Why"
- "Should I Be Flattered"
- "Have I Been Wrong"
- "Thank God They're Married"
- "Since We Said Goodbye"
- "My Dear Miss Bennet"
- "I Need To Know"
- "Finale"
