= Barry James =

British actor

Barry James is an English theatre actor and singer.

== Theatre credits ==
He trained at the Guildford School of Acting. Barry began his career at the National Theatre with the Laurence Olivier Company working with Maggie Smith, Laurence Olivier, Anthony Hopkins, Derek Jacobi, Geraldine McEwan amongst others His stage roles include:

- He created the role of Seymour in the first West End production of Little Shop of Horrors at the Comedy Theatre in 1983
- Mendel in the European Premiere of March Of The Falsettos at the Library Theatre Manchester in 1987
- Otto Kringelein in "Grand Hotel" at the Dominion Theatre' 1992
- The Baker in Into the Woods at Manchester Library Theatre in 1993
- Beadle Bamford in the 1994 National Theatre production of Sondheim's Sweeney Todd: The Demon Barber of Fleet Street (Nominated for an Olivier Award)
- Cogsworth in the first West End production of Disney's Beauty and the Beast at the Dominion Theatre (a role he reprised in the UK Tour of the show)
- Mr. Bumble in the London Palladium production of Lionel Bart's Oliver!
- Ladislav Sipos in "She Loves Me" at the Savoy Theatre London in 1994/95
- Monsieur Thénardier in the London production of Les Misérables at the Palace Theatre and Queen's Theatre
- King Herod in Jesus Christ Superstar in concert at Ferneham Hall in 2004
- Mr. Mushnik in the 2006 London revival of Little Shop of Horrors at the Menier Chocolate Factory and the 2007 revival at the Ambassadors Theatre
- Herr Schultz in 2007 and 2008 in the West End revival of Cabaret at Lyric Theatre, London
- Monsieur Richard Firmin in The Phantom of the Opera at Her Majesty's Theatre, London (2008–13) and the 25th Anniversary Performances at the Royal Albert Hall (2011) opposite Gareth Snook as Andre for the entirety of his runs in both productions.
- Grandpa Joe in Charlie and the Chocolate Factory at the Theatre Royal, Drury Lane

James can be heard on cast recordings of Beauty and the Beast, My Fair Lady, "She Loves Me" and two Bernard J. Taylor musicals - Nosferatu the Vampire (in which he created the role of "Renfeld"), Much Ado in which he created the role of Leonato, and Monsieur Firmin in The Phantom of the Opera 25th Anniversary Concert. He is also Thénardier in the 1988 symphonic cast recording of Les Misérables.

== Notes ==
The Phantom of the Opera at the Royal Albert Hall Blu-ray/DVD and cast recording
