= Andrew Lloyd Webber: The Premiere Collection Encore =

The Premiere Collection Encore

Compilation album by Andrew Lloyd Webber
- Released: 1992
- Length: 58:32
- Label: Really Useful; Polydor
- Producer: Andrew Lloyd Webber (also exec. producer); Nigel Wright; Mike Batt; Mike Moran

Andrew Lloyd Webber chronology
The Premiere Collection (1988)	The Premiere Collection Encore (1992)	Now & Forever (2001)

The Premiere Collection Encore is a 1992 compilation album by Andrew Lloyd Webber. The album acted as a follow-up to The Premiere Collection: The Best of Andrew Lloyd Webber (1988). In the four intervening years, the original London production of Aspects of Love and Lloyd Webber's new production of Joseph and the Amazing Technicolor Dreamcoat had both opened; therefore a number of tracks were included from those shows.

A video compilation with the same title, but including songs from both Premiere Collection compilations, was released the same year on VHS and CD-i, and in 1993 on LaserDisc.

The songs' lyricists include Tim Rice, Don Black, Richard Stilgoe, Charles Hart and Trevor Nunn.

== Track listing ==
All music written by Andrew Lloyd Webber.

No.	Title	Lyrics	Origin	Length
1.	"Amigos Para Siempre (Friends for Life)" (José Carreras & Sarah Brightman)	Don Black	Official theme of the Barcelona 1992 Games	4:34
2.	"Love Changes Everything" (Michael Ball)	Black; Charles Hart	Aspects of Love	3:29
3.	"Memory" (Barbra Streisand)	T. S. Eliot; Trevor Nunn	Cats	3:54
4.	"I Am the Starlight" (Lon Satton & Ray Shell)	Richard Stilgoe	Starlight Express	4:13
5.	"Wishing You Were Somehow Here Again" (Sarah Brightman)	Hart; Stilgoe	The Phantom of the Opera	3:07
6.	"Argentine Melody" (San José featuring Rodriguez Argentina)	―	1978 official BBC TV World Cup theme	2:08
7.	"Oh What a Circus" (David Essex)	Tim Rice	Evita	3:57
8.	"Seeing Is Believing" (Michael Ball & Ann Crumb)	Black; Hart	Aspects of Love	3:42
9.	"The Jellicle Ball" (The Royal Philharmonic Orchestra)	―	Cats / 1982 World Cup Grandstand theme	3:15
10.	"Any Dream Will Do" (Jason Donovan)	Rice	Joseph and the Amazing Technicolor Dreamcoat	3:53
11.	"Everything's Alright" (Sarah Brightman)	Rice	Jesus Christ Superstar	4:31
12.	"Close Every Door" (Phillip Schofield)	Rice	Joseph and the Amazing Technicolor Dreamcoat	3:04
13.	"The First Man You Remember" (Michael Ball & Diana Morrison)	Black; Hart	Aspects of Love	3:24
14.	"Anything But Lonely" (Sarah Brightman)	Black; Hart	Aspects of Love	2:58
15.	"The Point of No Return" (Michael Crawford & Sarah Brightman)	Hart; Stilgoe	The Phantom of the Opera	5:00
16.	"Hosanna" (Plácido Domingo)	―	Requiem	3:14

=== Video ===
1. "The Phantom of the Opera" – Sarah Brightman & Steve Harley (from The Phantom of the Opera)
2. "The Music of the Night" – Michael Crawford (from The Phantom of the Opera)
3. "All I Ask of You" – Cliff Richard & Sarah Brightman (from The Phantom of the Opera)
4. "Tell Me on a Sunday" – Sarah Brightman (from Tell Me on a Sunday)
5. "Pie Jesu" – Sarah Brightman & Paul Miles Kingston with the Winchester Cathedral Choir (from Requiem)
6. "Amigos Para Siempre (Friends for Life)" – José Carreras & Sarah Brightman (Official theme of the Barcelona 1992 Games)
7. "Love Changes Everything" – Michael Ball (from Aspects of Love)
8. "Wishing You Were Somehow Here Again" – Sarah Brightman (from The Phantom of the Opera)
9. "Oh What a Circus" (Live) – David Essex (from Evita)
10. "Any Dream Will Do" – Jason Donovan (from Joseph and the Amazing Technicolor Dreamcoat)
11. "Close Every Door" – Phillip Schofield (from Joseph and the Amazing Technicolor Dreamcoat)
12. "The First Man You Remember" – Michael Ball & Diana Morrison (from Aspects of Love)
13. "Anything But Lonely" – Sarah Brightman (from Aspects of Love)
14. "Joseph Mega-Remix" – Jason Donovan & cast (from Joseph and the Amazing Technicolor Dreamcoat)

== Personnel ==
Adapted from the album's liner notes.

- Andrew Lloyd Webber – producer (tracks 1–6, 8, 9, 11–15), executive producer (tracks 10, 12)
- Nigel Wright – producer (tracks 1, 10, 12)
- Mike Batt – producer (track 7)
- Mike Moran – producer (track 16)
