= Much Ado =

Much Ado, Bernard J. Taylor's musical version of Shakespeare's Much Ado About Nothing, was recorded as a concept album in 1995, featuring Paul McGann, Peter Karrie and other West End stars. It received its world premiere at Stratford-on-Avon in 1996. It was partly inspired by the Kenneth Branagh film version. The most recent production was in Budapest, Hungary, opening in June 2007.

Terry Wardrope, critic for the European musicals magazine Words and Music, wrote: "The usual fine cast once again give full throat to a grand selection of songs. One of the strongest facets of Mr Taylor's musical talents I have found is his ability to write music in the style befitting the age his work is set, as MUCH ADO so admirably demonstrates. Paul McGann's singing voice adds style. and panache to his solo numbers (If I Could Write A Sonnet and The Strange Affliction Called Love) as well as a pleasing accompaniment to the redoubtable Claire Moore In Disdain" and Then Kill For Me. Of course, as always Claire Moore gives a breathtaking performance with (among others) I'll Never Marry and How Can This Be, but then that lady can do no wrong in my book. It's another impressive piece from Bernard Taylor, reinforcing my impression that he is one of the finest British musical talents we have."

Mike Gibb, editor of Masquerade, the British musicals review magazine, wrote: "It proves to be yet another fine slab of musical writing, full of invention and, as with all BJT offerings, dripping with melody. It also succeeds in capturing the mood of the period courtesy of a medieval English feel amongst the diverse musical influences. Paul McGann and Simon Burke must have been delighted with the quality of the material they were offered with the likes of I'll Never Love Again and If I Could Write A Sonnet - both grade 'A' Taylor ballads - gentle, flowing, melodious."
