= Little Shop of Horrors (musical) =

Musical by Alan Menken and Howard Ashman

- Original Cast Album
- Music: Alan Menken
- Lyrics: Howard Ashman
- Book: Howard Ashman
- Basis: The Little Shop of Horrors by Charles B. Griffith
- Productions: 1982 Off-Broadway; 1983 West End; 2003 Broadway; 2004 US tour; 2007 West End revival; 2009 UK tour; 2016 UK tour; 2019 Off-Broadway revival
- Awards: Drama Desk Award for Outstanding Musical; Drama Desk Award for Outstanding Lyrics

Little Shop of Horrors is a horror comedy rock musical with music by Alan Menken and lyrics and a book by Howard Ashman. The story follows a hapless florist shop worker who raises a plant that feeds on human blood and flesh. The musical is loosely based on the low-budget 1960 black comedy film The Little Shop of Horrors. Menken's score features early 1960s-style rock and roll, doo-wop and early Motown.

The musical premiered off-off-Broadway in 1982 before moving to the Orpheum Theatre off-Broadway, where it had a five-year run. It later received numerous productions in the U.S. and abroad, and a subsequent Broadway production. In part because of its small cast, it has become popular with school and other amateur theatre groups. The musical was also made into a 1986 film of the same name, directed by Frank Oz.

== Synopsis ==
=== Act I ===
A trio of 1960s street urchins named Crystal, Ronette, and Chiffon set the scene ("Little Shop of Horrors") and comment on the action throughout the show. Seymour Krelborn is a poor young man, an orphan living in an urban skid row. Audrey is a pretty blonde with a fashion sense that leans towards tackiness. They lament their stations in life and the urban blight in their neighborhood ("Skid Row (Downtown)"). They are co-workers at a run-down flower shop owned and operated by the cranky Mr. Mushnik. After a sudden eclipse of the sun, Seymour finds a mysterious plant that looks like a large Venus flytrap ("Da-Doo"). Seymour, who is secretly in love with Audrey, names the plant Audrey II in her honor.

The plant does not thrive in its new environment and appears to be dying, though Seymour takes very good care of it. He accidentally pricks his finger on a rose thorn, which draws blood, and Audrey II's pod opens thirstily. Seymour realizes that Audrey II requires blood to survive and allows the plant to suckle from his finger ("Grow For Me"). As Audrey II grows, it becomes an attraction at the flower shop and starts generating brisk business for Mushnik. As the caretaker of the plant, the timid Seymour is suddenly regarded as a hero ("Ya Never Know"), while Audrey secretly longs to leave her abusive boyfriend. Her dream is to lead an ideal suburban life with Seymour, complete with a tract home, frozen dinners and plastic on the furniture ("Somewhere That's Green").

Meanwhile, the employees at Mushnik's are sprucing up the flower shop because of the popularity of the rapidly growing Audrey II and the revenue that it is bringing in ("Closed for Renovation"). Audrey's abusive boyfriend, Orin Scrivello, a sadistic dentist ("Dentist!"), encourages Seymour to take the plant and get out of Skid Row. Realizing that his store's sudden profitability is completely dependent on the plant (and therefore on Seymour), Mushnik takes advantage of Seymour's innocence by offering to adopt him and make him a full partner in the business ("Mushnik and Son"). Seymour accepts, even though Mushnik treats him poorly ("Sudden Changes"). When Seymour, running out of blood, stops feeding the plant, Audrey II demands blood and promises that, if fed, it will make sure that all of Seymour's dreams come true ("Feed Me (Git It)").

Seymour sets up a late-night appointment with Orin, intending to kill him for his cruel treatment of Audrey. However, Seymour loses his nerve and decides not to commit the crime. Unfortunately for Orin, who is getting high on nitrous oxide, the gas device is stuck in the "on" position, and he suffocates while asking Seymour to save him. Though Seymour cannot bring himself to shoot Orin, he lets him die of asphyxiation ("Now (It's Just The Gas)"). Seymour feeds Orin's body to the now huge Audrey II, and the plant consumes it with ravenous glee ("Act I Finale").

=== Act II ===
"Suddenly, Seymour"
The beginning of the last chorus of "Suddenly, Seymour", performed by Kerry Butler and Hunter Foster on the 2003 Broadway revival cast recording.

The flower shop is much busier, and Seymour and Audrey have trouble keeping up with the onslaught of orders ("Call Back in the Morning"). Audrey confides to Seymour that she feels guilty about Orin's disappearance, because secretly she wished it. The two admit their feelings for one another, and Seymour promises that he will protect and care for Audrey from now on ("Suddenly, Seymour").

Before they can go, Mushnik confronts Seymour about Orin's death. Seymour denies killing Orin, but Mushnik wants him to give a statement to the police, who have begun investigating. Audrey II tells Seymour that he has to be rid of Mushnik or he will lose everything, including Audrey. Seymour tells Mushnik that he put the days' receipts inside Audrey II for safekeeping. Mushnik climbs inside the plant's gaping maw to search for the money and screams as he is devoured ("Suppertime"). Seymour now runs the flower shop, and reporters, salesmen, lawyers and agents approach him, promising him fame and fortune. Seymour realizes that it is only a matter of time before Audrey II will kill again and that he is morally responsible, but he does nothing over fear that Audrey will no longer love him if he is not successful ("The Meek Shall Inherit").

As Seymour works on his speech for a lecture tour, Audrey II again squalls for blood. Seymour threatens to kill it just as Audrey walks in asking when Mushnik will return from "visiting his sick sister". Seymour learns that Audrey would still love him without the fame and resolves that following an upcoming LIFE magazine interview at the shop, Audrey II must die. Audrey is confused and frightened by Seymour's ramblings, but she runs home by his order.

That night, unable to sleep and distressed by Seymour's strange behavior, Audrey goes to the flower shop to talk with him. He is not there, and Audrey II begs her to water it. Not sensing the danger, she approaches to water it, and a vine pulls her into the plant's gaping maw ("Sominex/Suppertime II"). Seymour arrives and pulls her out, but Audrey is mortally wounded. Her dying wish is for Seymour to feed her to the plant after she dies so that they can always be together. She dies in his arms, and he reluctantly honors her request ("Somewhere That's Green" (reprise)).

The next day, Patrick Martin from the World Botanical Enterprises tells Seymour that his company wishes to sell leaf cuttings of Audrey II in florist shops across America. Seymour realizes the plant's evil plan: world conquest. He tries shooting, cutting, and poisoning the plant, but it has grown too hardy to kill. Seymour, in desperation, runs into its open jaws with a machete planning to kill it from the inside, but he is quickly eaten ("Bigger Than Hula-hoops"). Patrick, Crystal, Ronette, and Chiffon search for Seymour. Not finding him, Patrick tells the girls to take the cuttings.

Crystal, Ronette, and Chiffon relate that, following these events, other plants appeared across America, tricking innocent people into feeding them blood in exchange for fame and fortune. Audrey II, bigger than ever, appears with opened new flowers revealing the faces of Seymour, Audrey, Mushnik and Orin who beg that the plants must not be fed ("Finale Ultimo: Don't Feed the Plants"). Audrey II slithers towards the audience threateningly.

== Early productions ==
=== 1982 Off-Broadway ===
The musical premiered off-off-Broadway, at the Workshop of the Players Art Foundation (WPA Theatre), playing there from May 6, 1982 to June 6, 1982. The show moved off-Broadway to the Orpheum Theatre in Manhattan's East Village, opening on July 27, 1982. The production, directed by Ashman, with musical staging by Edie Cowan, received generally positive critical reviews and won the 1982–1983 Drama Desk Award for Outstanding Musical, as well as the New York Drama Critics Circle Award for Best Musical and the Outer Critics Circle Award. In the original WPA cast were Lee Wilkof as Seymour, Ellen Greene as Audrey, Hy Anzell as Mr. Mushnik, Franc Luz as Orin, Jennifer Leigh Warren as Crystal, Sheila Kay Davis as Ronnette and Leilani Jones as Chiffon; Ron Taylor was the voice of Audrey II, and Martin P. Robinson, the Audrey II puppeteer, designed the puppets.

The production ran for five years. When it closed on November 1, 1987, after 2,210 performances, it was the third-longest running musical and the highest-grossing production in off-Broadway history. Though a Broadway transfer had been proposed for the production, author and director Howard Ashman felt the show belonged off-Broadway. Since it was not produced on Broadway, the original production was ineligible for the 1982 Tony Awards. The producers were the WPA Theatre, David Geffen, Cameron Mackintosh and the Shubert Organization. Ashman wrote, in the introduction to the acting edition of the libretto, that the show "satirizes ... science fiction, 'B' movies, musical comedy itself, and even the Faust legend".

An original cast recording, released in 1982, omitted the songs "Call Back in the Morning" and the reprise of "Somewhere That's Green", and had abridged versions of "Now (It's Just the Gas)", "Mushnik and Son" and "The Meek Shall Inherit". It also shifted the location of the song "Closed for Renovation," appearing in the show after "Somewhere That's Green" while appearing on the cast album after "Now (It's Just the Gas)" to serve as an upbeat bridge from Orin's death to the Act II love ballad, "Suddenly, Seymour". The recording features Leilani Jones, who originated the role of Chiffon at the WPA and replaced Marlene Danielle two weeks after the musical opened off-Broadway.

=== 1983 West End ===
A London West End production opened on October 12, 1983, at the Comedy Theatre, produced by Cameron Mackintosh. It ran for 813 performances, starring Barry James as Seymour, Greene reprising her role as Audrey and Harry Towb as Mr. Mushnik, with Sinitta (then surnamed Renet) understudying Chiffon, Crystal and Ronnette. Zeeteah Massiah took over as Chiffon in 1984. Greene was replaced as Audrey by Claire Moore (1984) then Sarah Payne (1985). Orin was played by Terence Hillyer (1983), David Burt (1984) and Bogdan Kominowski (1985). Audrey II was puppeteered by Anthony Asbury, and the costumes were designed by Tim Goodchild. It received the 1983 Evening Standard Award for Best Musical and closed on October 5, 1985.

=== 1984 Australia and 1985 Canada ===
An Australian production opened at Her Majesty's Theatre, Perth on January 14, 1984, starring Christopher Pate as Seymour and Denise Kirby as Audrey. It then moved to the Theatre Royal in Sydney from November 7, 1984, and the Comedy Theatre in Melbourne from February, 1985.

A 1985 Canadian production starred Sheila McCarthy as Audrey and Michael Crossman as Seymour. Gerry Salsberg was Orin.

== Musical numbers ==
Act I

- Prologue ("Little Shop of Horrors") – Chiffon, Crystal and Ronnette
- "Skid Row (Downtown)" – Company
- "Da-Doo" – Chiffon, Crystal and Ronnette (with Seymour speaking)
- "Grow for Me" – Seymour
- "Ya Never Know" – Mushnik, Chiffon, Crystal, Ronnette and Seymour
- "Somewhere That's Green" – Audrey
- "Closed for Renovation" – Seymour, Audrey and Mushnik
- "Dentist!" – Orin, Chiffon, Crystal and Ronnette
- "Mushnik and Son" – Mushnik and Seymour
- "Sudden Changes" – Seymour
- "Feed Me (Git It)" – Audrey II, Seymour, Chiffon, Crystal, Ronnette
- "Now (It's Just the Gas)" – Orin and Seymour
- "Coda (Act I Finale)" – Chiffon, Crystal, Ronnette and Audrey II

Act II

- "Call Back in the Morning" – Seymour and Audrey
- "Suddenly, Seymour" – Seymour, Audrey, Chiffon, Crystal and Ronnette
- "Suppertime" – Audrey II (with Seymour and Mushnik speaking)
- "The Meek Shall Inherit" – Seymour, Chiffon, Crystal, Ronnette and three opportunists
- "Sominex/Suppertime II" – Audrey and Audrey II
- "Somewhere That's Green" (reprise) – Audrey (with Seymour speaking)
- "Finale Ultimo (Don't Feed the Plants)" – Company

== Casts ==
Casts for long-running productions of Little Shop of Horrors
Character	Off-Broadway	West End	Broadway	West End revival	Off-Broadway revival
Character	1982	1983	2003	2007	2019
Seymour Krelborn	Lee Wilkof	Barry James	Hunter Foster	Paul Keating	Jonathan Groff
Audrey	Ellen Greene	Ellen Greene	Kerry Butler	Sheridan Smith	Tammy Blanchard
Mr. Mushnik	Hy Anzell	Harry Towb	Rob Bartlett	Barry James	Tom Alan Robbins
Orin Scrivello & Others	Franc Luz	Terence Hillyer	Douglas Sills	Alistair McGowan	Christian Borle
Crystal	Jennifer Leigh Warren	Dawn Hope	Trisha Jeffrey	Melitsa Nicola	Salome Smith
Ronette	Sheila Kay Davis	Shezwae Powell	Carla J. Hargrove	Jenny Fitzpatrick	Ari Groover
Chiffon	Marlene Danielle	Nicola Blackman	DeQuina Moore	Katie Kerr	Joy Woods
Audrey II (voice)	Ron Taylor	Michael James Leslie	Michael-Leon Wooley	Mike McShane	Kingsley Leggs
Audrey II (puppeteer)	Martin P. Robinson	Anthony Asbury	Martin P. Robinson; Anthony Asbury; Bill Remington; Matt Vogel	Andy Heath	Eric Wright; Teddy Yudain

=== Notable replacements ===
Off-Broadway (1982–87)

- Seymour: Stuart Zagnit
- Audrey: Annie Golden, Faith Prince
- Chiffon: Leilani Jones
- Mushnik: Fyvush Finkel

West End (1984–85)

- Audrey: Claire Moore, Sarah Payne
- Orin & Others: David Burt, Bogdan Kominowski
- Chiffon: Zeeteah Massiah

Broadway (2003–04)

- Seymour: Joey Fatone
- Orin & Others: Rob Evan, Darren Ritchie

Off-Broadway (2019– )

- Seymour: Gideon Glick, Jeremy Jordan, Conrad Ricamora, Skylar Astin, Rob McClure, Matt Doyle, Corbin Bleu, Darren Criss, Andrew Barth Feldman, Nicholas Christopher, Milo Manheim, Graham Phillips, Thomas Doherty, Joshua Bassett, Jordan Fisher, Ethan Slater
- Audrey: Lena Hall, Maude Apatow, Joy Woods, Constance Wu, Evan Rachel Wood, Jinkx Monsoon, Sarah Hyland, Sherie Rene Scott, Elizabeth Gillies, Madeline Brewer, Nikki M. James, Betsy Wolfe, Hannah Cruz
- Orin & Others: Bryce Pinkham, Drew Gehling, James Carpinello, Jeremy Kushnier, Andrew Durand, Andy Karl, Claybourne Elder
- Mushnik: Stuart Zagnit, Brad Oscar, Stephen DeRosa, Reg Rogers

== Differences between the 1960 film and stage musical ==
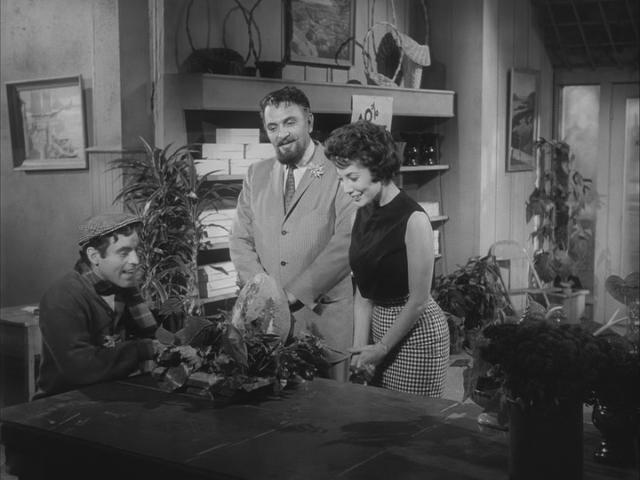
Seymour shows off the plant to Audrey and Mr. Mushnik in the 1960 film

The musical is based on the basic concept and dark comic tone of the 1960 film, although it changes much of the story. Seymour's hypochondriacal Jewish mother is omitted in the musical, and Seymour becomes an orphan in the care of Mushnik. Also dropped is the subplot involving the two investigating police officers. The characters of Mrs. Siddie Shiva and Burson Fouch are also omitted, although Mrs. Shiva is mentioned as being the shop's biggest funeral account. The gleefully masochistic dental patient, played in the 1960 film by Jack Nicholson, is not in the musical but is in the 1986 film, played by Bill Murray.

In the musical, the sadistic dentist, Orin Scrivello, is killed by suffocation from laughing gas instead of being stabbed with a dental instrument as in the film. The musical shows him in an abusive relationship with Audrey, which gives Seymour a motive to kill him. In the film, Seymour murders several innocent bystanders, and Mushnik tricks a thief into looking for money inside the plant, which eats the thief. In the musical, Seymour tricks Mushnik in the same way when he learns that Mushnik plans to turn him over to the police. The two neighborhood girls in the film are replaced in the musical by three street urchins who function as a modern Greek chorus: Crystal, Chiffon, and Ronette, named after three popular girl groups of the 1960s. The plant is named "Audrey II" in the musical, rather than the film's "Audrey Junior".

Perhaps the biggest difference is the ending. The musical ends with Orin, Mushnik, Audrey and Seymour all eaten by the plant, and the three girls report that Audrey II's progeny continue to consume people. In the 1960 film, Mushnik and Audrey survive, and the plant's carnivorous activities are discovered when its flowers bloom with the faces of its victims, including Seymour, imprinted on them. The musical refers to this ending in its finale, in which the faces of the Plant's four victims are seen in its blooming flowers.

Marc Jensen, writing in Cinema Journal, believes that the change to the ending of the musical contributes to its portrayal of class struggles and moral values. While the 1986 film shows Seymour and Audrey escaping to a suburban house that encapsulates ideals of the 1950s American Dream, Jensen says the musical hints at a metaphorical portrayal in which the plant is Seymour's greed, gradually consuming Audrey and himself. An essay in the 2013 publication Marxism and the Movies argues that the musical engages with ideas relating to human values in the face of capitalist culture, disempowering those who are enveloped with motivations of personal monetary gain and overlook moral values; in their opinion, it serves as a social commentary on commodity fetishism.

== Subsequent productions ==
=== 2003 Florida tryout, Broadway revival and 2004 tour ===
In 2003, an $8 million revival of Little Shop of Horrors was planned with the goal of opening on Broadway. A pre-Broadway production debuted at the Miracle Theatre in Coral Gables, Florida on May 16, 2003. Lee Wilkof, who originated the role of Seymour in 1982, was cast as Mr. Mushnik. The production was directed by Wilkof's wife, Connie Grappo, who was the assistant to Howard Ashman during the original production. Martin P. Robinson, who designed the original Audrey II puppets, enlisted fellow puppeteers and builders from The Jim Henson Company to create and operate new puppets for the show, ranging from the smallest plant (operated solely by Robinson) to the largest (requiring three additional puppeteers to fully control). Hunter Foster and Alice Ripley played Seymour and Audrey, and Billy Porter was the voice of Audrey II.

Critics complained that by expanding the show to fit a larger theatre, its intimacy was lost; they also judged several actors as miscast, although the Miami Herald declared that "Alice Ripley's Audrey – part lisping Kewpie doll (a la Ellen Greene, who originated the role), part dental punching bag – is heartbreakingly adorable." In June 2003, the producers announced that the Broadway production was cancelled. Nevertheless, within weeks, they ousted Grappo in favor of veteran Broadway director Jerry Zaks, who fired everyone in the cast, except Foster, and redirected the production from scratch. New casting was announced in July.

The musical made its Broadway debut at the Virginia Theatre on October 2, 2003, with Foster as Seymour, Kerry Butler as Audrey, Rob Bartlett as Mr. Mushnik, Douglas Sills as Orin, Michael-Leon Wooley as the voice of Audrey II and DeQuina Moore as Chiffon. Although this was the first time it had played on Broadway, the show's success in film and numerous regional productions made it fall under the "Revival" category for the 2003 Tony Awards. Foster was nominated for the 2004 Tony Award for Best Actor in a Musical for his performance. The revival was fairly faithful to the original 1982 production. Changes included the expanded version of the title song heard in the 1986 film, and expanded "You Never Know" with a "WSKID" radio introduction, and a revised Act I Finale and added Entr'acte before "Call Back in the Morning." The orchestrations were beefed up for the bigger theatre to add reeds, trumpets and percussion to the original 5-piece combo.

The cast recording, recorded on September 15, 2003, was released on October 21. Demo recordings to five songs ("A Little Dental Music", "The Worse He Treats Me", "We'll Have Tomorrow", "Bad" and "I Found a Hobby") cut during the development process of the musical were included as bonus material for the album. The production closed on August 22, 2004, after 40 previews and 372 regular performances. The closing Broadway cast included Joey Fatone as Seymour.

On August 10, 2004, a U.S. national tour of the Broadway production began, with Anthony Rapp starring as Seymour, Tari Kelly as Audrey, Lenny Wolpe as Mushnik and Michael James Leslie as the voice of Audrey II. The tour closed April 16, 2006 in Columbus, Ohio.

=== UK revivals ===
The first major London revival began previews on November 17, 2006, at the Menier Chocolate Factory, Off West End. This revival, directed by Matthew White, featured a new Audrey II designed by David Farley, resembling the pitcher plant. The production was a critical and commercial success and transferred to the Duke of York's Theatre in London's West End in March 2007. In June 2007, the show transferred to the Ambassadors Theatre, where it ended its run on September 8, 2007. The West End cast featured Paul Keating as Seymour, Sheridan Smith as Audrey, Alistair McGowan as Orin and Mike McShane providing the voice of Audrey II. Barry James, who portrayed Seymour in the original West End production, was Mr. Mushnik. Smith and McGowan received 2008 Laurence Olivier Award nominations, and the production was nominated for Best Musical Revival. The production toured the UK in 2009 with a cast including Damian Humbley as Seymour, Clare Buckfield as Audrey, Alex Ferns as Orin, Sylvester McCoy as Mr Mushnik and Clive Rowe as the voice of Audrey II.

A UK tour began on August 4, 2016, directed by Tara Wilkinson, starring Sam Lupton as Seymour, Stephanie Clift as Audrey and Rhydian Roberts as Orin. It was booked through November 26, 2016.

A revival at London's Regent's Park Open Air Theatre, from August 3 to September 22, 2018, was directed by Maria Aberg, choreographed by Lizzi Gee and designed by Tom Scutt. It starred Marc Antolin as Seymour, Jemima Rooper as Audrey, Forbes Masson as Mr Mushnik, Matt Willis as Orin and American drag performer Vicky Vox as Audrey II. The production included the song "Mean Green Mother from Outer Space", written for the 1986 film, as an encore number.

=== 2015 Encores! ===
A three-performance Encores! concert staging at New York City Center as part of its Off-Center series ran in July 2015. Directed by Dick Scanlan, the production starred Jake Gyllenhaal as Seymour, and Ellen Greene reprising her role as Audrey. Taran Killam played Orin, with Tracy Nicole Chapman, Marva Hicks and Ramona Keller as the urchins. Joe Grifasi was Mr. Mushnik, with Eddie Cooper as the plant. Reviewers praised Greene, Gyllenhaal and the cast in general. Ben Brantley wrote in The New York Times: "A confluence of alchemical elements was at work, converging in ways that made a perfectly charming but small musical feel like a major event."

=== 2016 Australian tour ===
An Australian tour opened at the Hayes Theatre in Sydney on February 22, 2016, before touring to Her Majesty's Theatre, Adelaide; The Comedy Theatre, Melbourne; Canberra Theatre Centre; Queensland Performing Arts Centre, Brisbane, and The Roslyn Packer Theatre, Sydney. It starred Brent Hill as Seymour, Esther Hannaford as Audrey, Tyler Coppin as Mushnik and Scott Johnson as Orin. Hill also voiced Audrey II. The production was directed by Dean Bryant and choreographed by Andy Hallwsorth The production was nominated for ten Sydney Theatre Awards, winning eight, including Best Production of a Musical, and five Helpmann Awards, winning none. Cassie Tongue wrote of it in The Guardian: "Watching this show feels like a discovery, or a reaffirmation; to be reminded why musical theatre matters, to be assured that musicals are a difficult, exhilarating art. And all this from a campy cult classic. What magic."

=== US regional productions ===
From October 24 to 28, 2018 Little Shop was performed as a part of the 2018 Broadway Center Stage series at the John F. Kennedy Center for the Performing Arts. It starred Josh Radnor as Seymour and Megan Hilty as Audrey. It also featured Lee Wilkof, the original Seymour, as Mr. Mushnik, Nick Cordero as Orin and Michael James Leslie reprising his role as the voice of Audrey II from Broadway.

Pasadena Playhouse staged a production from September 17 to October 20, 2019, directed by Mike Donahue. The cast included George Salazar as Seymour, Michaela Jaé Rodriguez as Audrey, Amber Riley as Audrey II, Kevin Chamberlin as Mr. Mushnik and Matthew Wilkas as Orin.

=== 2019 Off-Broadway revival ===
An off-Broadway revival at the Westside Theatre began previews on September 17, 2019, with an official opening on October 17, 2019. The cast starred Jonathan Groff as Seymour, Tammy Blanchard as Audrey, Christian Borle as Orin and Tom Alan Robbins as Mr. Mushnik. Michael Mayer directed, with choreography by Ellenore Scott. The lighting designer was Bradley King. The plant for this production was voiced by Kingsley Leggs. A cast album was released digitally on December 20, 2019. Gideon Glick began playing Seymour in early 2020. The production suspended performances on March 11, 2020, because of the COVID-19 pandemic, and reopened on September 21, 2021, with Jeremy Jordan as Seymour; Mayer, Scott, Blanchard, Borle and Robbins returned. The cast album received a physical release on the day of reopening. Some performances were cancelled, due to the pandemic, off and on during December 2021. The revival has gone on to have a long run: later players in the role of Seymour have included Conrad Ricamora, Skylar Astin, Rob McClure, Matt Doyle, Corbin Bleu, Darren Criss, Andrew Barth Feldman, Nicholas Christopher, Milo Manheim, Graham Phillips, Thomas Doherty, Joshua Bassett, Jordan Fisher, and Ethan Slater. Drew Gehling, Bryce Pinkham, James Carpinello, Jeremy Kushnier, Andrew Durand, Andy Karl, and Claybourne Elder have played Orin, and replacements for Mushnik have included Stuart Zagnit, Brad Oscar, Reg Rogers and Stephen DeRosa. Audrey has been played by Lena Hall, Maude Apatow, Joy Woods (who originated the role of Chiffon in the revival), Constance Wu, Evan Rachel Wood, Jinkx Monsoon, Sarah Hyland, Sherie Rene Scott, Elizabeth Gillies, Madeline Brewer, Nikki M. James, and Betsy Wolfe.

The production is the longest-running in the show's history, surpassing the original production's run of 2,210 performances.

== Audrey II puppets ==
Audrey II devours Audrey; 2006–07 London production

The character of Audrey II is described as being "An anthropomorphic cross between a Venus flytrap and an avocado. It has a huge, nasty-looking pod that gains a shark-like aspect when open and snapping at food. The creature is played by a series of increasing[ly] large puppets".

In productions, the first puppet is a small potted plant "less than one foot tall" held by the actor portraying Seymour. He manipulates the plant himself with his hand and then sets it down, where it is moved by an unseen hand from beneath a shelf. The second puppet is slightly larger than the first and is operated by Seymour during the song "You Never Know". A fake arm in a sleeve matching Seymour's jacket is attached to the plant's pot, while the actor's real arm operates the plant. The third puppet sits on the floor and is large enough to hide a person inside, who moves the plant's mouth in sync with Audrey II's voice, which is supplied by an offstage actor on a microphone. The puppeteer's legs are clad in green tights with "leaf" shoes that serve as part of the plant's tendrils. In Act II, the largest puppet again hides an actor inside, who manipulates the puppet's mouth and often some of its branches. By this point, the head is at least six feet long and capable of "swallowing" characters. For the finale, additions can be made to make the plant appear taller and even bigger. Actors and stage hands are often used to move larger branches and roots, which, in the original off-Broadway production, spilled off the stage and into the audience. In some productions, dangling vines over the house enhance the effect of Audrey II menacing the audience.

From the beginning of the musical's creation, Ashman wanted Audrey II to be a puppet. Feeling it would be the centerpiece of the show, he wanted it to be designed well. He contacted Julie Taymor, who at the time moonlighted as a puppet designer. Taymor drew up designs involving a screen with multiple mouths that resembled flowers, but she eventually recommended Martin P. Robinson to design the puppet. Robinson proposed, among other ideas, the fake arm puppet for "You Never Know", inspired by comedian Rod Hull's Emu puppet routine. Robinson's designs, or variations of them, have been used in the subsequent productions of Little Shop. Amateur productions of Little Shop of Horrors receive designs for building the puppets from MTI, as part of the rental scripts and scores, based on the original Martin P. Robinson designs. Some companies who have produced the show in the past and built their own puppets rent them out to other companies to recoup some of their construction costs.

== Adaptations ==
=== 1986 feature film ===
A film version of the musical was made in 1986. Directed by Frank Oz and noted as the only film written by Howard Ashman, it starred Rick Moranis as Seymour, Ellen Greene as Audrey, Vincent Gardenia as Mr. Mushnik, Steve Martin as Orin Scrivello, DDS, and the voice of Levi Stubbs as Audrey II. Bill Murray played the small comic role of the masochist, Arthur Denton. The 1986 film follows the plot of the musical closely but omits the songs "Ya Never Know" (rewritten as "Some Fun Now," a trio for Crystal, Ronnette and Chiffon), "Mushnik and Son", "Now (It's Just the Gas)", "Sudden Changes," "Closed for Renovation" and "Call Back in the Morning"; the final cut ending also omits "Finale Ultimo (Don't Feed The Plants)". Other changes include the removal of Mr. Mushnik's adoption proposition and a new ending, in which Seymour is able to save Audrey from Audrey II and then electrocutes the plant after it has destroyed the shop. Seymour and Audrey marry and move to the tract home of her dreams, but a small Audrey II-type bud is seen in their garden, which portends a possible spread of the alien plants. A new ending more faithful to the stage version was filmed, in which the plant eats Audrey and Seymour and then, having grown to massive size and reproduced, goes on a King Kong-style rampage through New York City with other Audrey II plants. It was received poorly by test audiences, and the upbeat alternate ending was used for the theatrical cut. In October 2012, the original ending was restored and released with the film as "The Director's Cut" on DVD and Blu-ray. A new song for Audrey II, "Mean Green Mother from Outer Space", was nominated for an Academy Award for Best Original Song.

== Awards and nominations ==
=== Original Off-Broadway production ===
Year	Award	Category	Nominee	Result
1983	Drama Desk Awards	Outstanding Musical		Won
1983	Drama Desk Awards	Outstanding Actress a Musical	Ellen Greene	Nominated
1983	Drama Desk Awards	Outstanding Featured Actor a Musical	Franc Luz	Nominated
1983	Drama Desk Awards	Outstanding Director of a Musical	Howard Ashman	Nominated
1983	Drama Desk Awards	Outstanding Music	Alan Menken	Nominated
1983	Drama Desk Awards	Outstanding Lyrics	Howard Ashman	Won
1983	Outer Critics Circle Awards	Best New Off-Broadway Musical		Won
1983	Outer Critics Circle Awards	Outstanding New Score	Alan Menken and Howard Ashman	Won
1983	New York Drama Critics' Circle Award	Best Musical		Won
1984	Grammy Awards	Best Musical Theater Album		Nominated

=== Original West End production ===
Year	Award	Category	Nominee	Result
1983	Laurence Olivier Awards	Musical of the Year		Nominated
1983	Laurence Olivier Awards	Actress of the Year in a Musical	Ellen Greene	Nominated

=== 2003 Broadway revival ===
Year	Award	Category	Nominee	Result
2004	Tony Awards	Best Performance by a Leading Actor in a Musical	Hunter Foster	Nominated
2004	Drama Desk Awards	Outstanding Actor in a Musical	Hunter Foster	Nominated
2004	Outer Critics Circle Awards	Outstanding Revival of a Musical		Nominated
2004	Outer Critics Circle Awards	Outstanding Actor in a Musical	Hunter Foster	Nominated
2004	Outer Critics Circle Awards	Outstanding Actress in a Musical	Kerry Butler	Nominated

=== 2007 West End revival ===
Year	Award	Category	Nominee	Result
2008	Laurence Olivier Awards	Best Musical Revival		Nominated
2008	Laurence Olivier Awards	Actress of the Year in a Musical	Sheridan Smith	Nominated
2008	Laurence Olivier Awards	Best Performance in a Supporting Role in a Musical	Alistair McGowan	Nominated

=== 2018 Regent's Park Open Air Theatre production ===
Year	Award	Category	Nominee	Result
2019	Laurence Olivier Awards	Actor of the Year in a Musical	Marc Antolin	Nominated

=== 2019 Off-Broadway revival ===
Year	Award	Category	Nominee	Result
2020	Lucille Lortel Awards	Outstanding Revival		Nominated
2020	Lucille Lortel Awards	Outstanding Lead Actor in a Musical	Jonathan Groff	Nominated
2020	Lucille Lortel Awards	Outstanding Featured Actor in a Musical	Christian Borle	Won
2020	Lucille Lortel Awards	Outstanding Featured Actress in a Musical	Ari Groover	Nominated
2020	Drama Desk Awards	Outstanding Revival of a Musical		Won
2020	Drama Desk Awards	Outstanding Actress in a Musical	Tammy Blanchard	Nominated
2020	Drama Desk Awards	Outstanding Featured Actor in a Musical	Christian Borle	Won
2020	Drama Desk Awards	Outstanding Scenic Design of a Musical	Julian Crouch	Nominated
2020	Drama League Awards	Outstanding Revival of a Musical (Broadway or Off-Broadway)		Won
2020	Drama League Awards	Distinguished Performance	Christian Borle	Nominated
2020	Drama League Awards	Distinguished Performance	Jonathan Groff	Nominated
2020	Outer Critics Circle Awards	Outstanding Revival of a Musical		Honored
2020	Outer Critics Circle Awards	Outstanding Director of a Musical	Michael Mayer	Honored
2020	Outer Critics Circle Awards	Outstanding Actor in a Musical	Jonathan Groff	Honored
2020	Outer Critics Circle Awards	Outstanding Featured Actor in a Musical	Christian Borle	Honored
2020	Grammy Awards	Best Musical Theater Album		Nominated
