= Dave Willetts =

English singer and actor

- Born: 24 June 1952 (age 74); Marston Green, England
- Occupations: Singer and actor
- Years active: 1984–present
- Known for: The Phantom of the Opera

Dave Willetts (born 24 June 1952) is an English singer and actor known for having leading roles in West End musicals.

His West End credits include leading roles in The Phantom of the Opera, Cats, Ragtime, Les Misérables, Sunset Boulevard and Aspects of Love. He also played leading roles in the UK tours of The Phantom of the Opera, South Pacific, and Legally Blonde.

For his performance in Sunset Boulevard, he was nominated for a Laurence Olivier Award for Best Performance in a Supporting Role in a Musical.

== Early life ==
Born in Marston Green, Birmingham, in 1952 and then brought up in Acocks Green. He first went to Cottesbrooke Infants primary school and later to Sheldon Heath Comprehensive (now known as King Edward VI Sheldon Heath Academy). His father worked at Rover. He has completed a Duke of Edinburgh Award Scheme programme. After leaving school at 16, he joined Girling Brakes as an apprentice, in Cwmbran, Wales. He then moved to another Girlings plant in Pontypool, with his then girlfriend Lyn. One night he went out with workmates to see “No, No Nanette” by the New Venture Players, an amateur drama group based in Newport. based at the Dolman Theatre. Despite rarely ever visiting a theatre, impressed by the play, he became interested in amateur dramatics. He auditioned for the New Venture Players next production, and finally landed a role. After 10 years in South Wales, he returned to Birmingham to take up a managerial post. He then worked as a quality manager for British Leyland, an engineering company producing components for the automotive industry in the Midlands.sheridan engineering But he also joined the Leamington and Warwick Operatic society to later star in “Music Man”. He then played 'Charlie Gordon' in amateur production of Charles Strouse musical, Flowers for Algernon, at the Priory Theatre in Kenilworth. Peter McGarry, the theatre critic of the Coventry Evening Telegraph gave him a rave review of his performance.

He then came to the attention of Bob Hamlyn, artistic director of the Belgrade Theatre, in Coventry who cast him as "third flunky from the left" in another show by Strouse, Annie. It was at this time, while Willetts was in his thirties, that he began his meteoric rise to the top, with the support of his wife. He decided to give up his management career and became an 'actor', while working part-time as a waiter and his wife as a childminder.

== Life and career ==
Director Trevor Nunn put Willetts into the chorus of London’s original West End production of Les Misérables and within a year he was understudy to Colm Wilkinson in the lead role of Jean Valjean, which Willetts eventually took over when Wilkinson left in 1986 to join the Broadway company.

In 1987, when Michael Crawford departed the London production of Andrew Lloyd Webber's The Phantom of the Opera for its Broadway premiere Willetts succeeded him in the title role at Her Majesty's Theatre in the West End. He subsequently played the role of The Phantom in Manchester, on the UK tour to critical acclaim, winning an Evening News Theatre Award.

In 1990, he was given his first opportunity to originate a role when he appeared opposite Petula Clark in Someone Like You, a musical for which she had composed the score.

Since then, Willetts has appeared in the title role in a concert version and studio cast album of Jesus Christ Superstar, taken the lead roles in Leicester Haymarket's acclaimed productions of Stephen Sondheim's Sweeney Todd: The Demon Barber of Fleet Street and Sunday in the Park with George, appeared as Old Deuteronomy in the 20th anniversary production of Andrew Lloyd Webber's Cats in London, and as Jean Valjean in the 10th anniversary production of Les Misérables in Sydney, Australia. He took the role of Heathcliff in the studio recording of Bernard J. Taylor musical version of Wuthering Heights.

In 2004, he appeared in the London premiere and West End production of Ragtime as the Father alongside Maria Friedman. In December of the same year he appeared in Aladdin in Bromley. He has played the starring role of 'Adam Pontipee' in Seven Brides for Seven Brothers in the West End (2006). and the national tour in 2002. He then played the role of 'Emile de Becque' in a UK touring production of Rogers and Hammerstein's South Pacific, which toured the UK until July 2008.

In 2007, Dave played the role of 'Julian Marsh' in a UK Tour of 42nd Street. He returned to the role in 2012, when the show again toured the UK. He played Max in a scaled-down production of Sunset Boulevard at the Comedy Theatre (now The Harold Pinter), directed by Craig Revel Horwood in September 2008, for which he was nominated for Laurence Olivier Award for Best Performance in a Supporting Role in a Musical.

In July 2011, he originated the role of Professor Callahan in the UK tour of Legally Blonde. In October 2014, he appeared as Father God in 'Love Beyond' at SSE Wembley Arena. Then in 2015, he appeared in 'Pure Imagination' at the St James Theatre, London in a musical based on the work by Leslie Bricusse. In 2017, he appeared as the White Rabbit in Wonderland, a new musical by Frank Wildhorn also starring Wendi Peters and Kerry Ellis.

In 2023, Dave played the role of Sir George Dillingham in a West End revival of Aspects of Love at the Lyric Theatre.

== Discography ==
Willetts has recorded several albums, mostly collections of songs from musicals. Including 'Once in a Lifetime', released just before his 60th birthday. He has performed on albums alongside Lesley Garrett, Clive Rowe and Claire Moore amongst others. Including appeared on 'Music And Songs From Aspects of Love/Phantom of the Opera' in 2008.

== Personal life ==
He has a wife Lyn (originally from Warwickshire,) a former nursery nurse and teacher. They married in 1972. He has 2 daughters and 3 grandchildren. They live in Baginton, near Coventry.
