= Bernard J. Taylor =

American composer

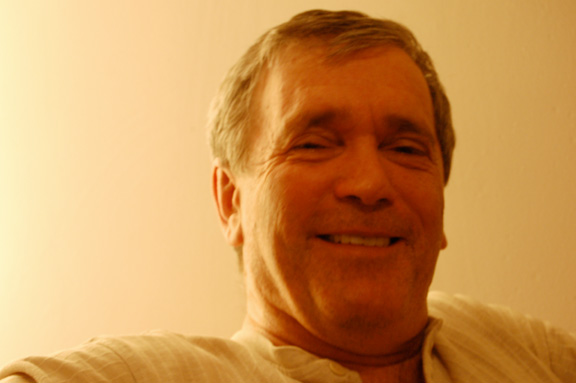
Bernard J. Taylor

Bernard J. Taylor is a writer and composer known for his musicals and stage plays. His works have been produced globally and translated into German, Romanian, Polish, Hungarian, Spanish, and Italian.

Born and educated in Cape Town, South Africa, Taylor is a descendant of John Taylor, a pioneer British missionary to southern Africa. In 1969, he relocated to England, where he resided until 1998. Following a year in Australia, he settled in the United States and now resides in San Antonio, Texas.

== Music and musicals ==
Taylor has composed numerous musicals.

=== Neighbors And Lovers ===
Taylor's first musical show was Neighbors And Lovers (1987), self-produced at the Oast Theatre, Tonbridge, England. However, Taylor decided to abandon it in favour of creating a musical based on a universally known story.

=== Wuthering Heights ===
Taylor selected Emily Brontë's classic Wuthering Heights, composing the music. A concept album was released in 1991 with a cast of West End musical stars including a former "Phantom Of The Opera" Dave Willetts, as Heathcliff, Lesley Garrett (Cathy Earnshaw), Bonnie Langford (Isabella Linton), Clive Carter (Hindley Earnshaw), Sharon Campbell (Ellen "Nelly" Dean) and James Staddon (Edgar Linton). It had its world premier at the Madison Theatre, Illinois, in 1993 and has since been performed in the UK, Germany, Australia, New Zealand, The Netherlands, Poland and Romania.

=== Make Me a Musical ===
Meanwhile, Taylor turned his attention to something entirely different. The show (originally entitled Success! and renamed in 2009) was a backstage musical, loosely based on Faust, and set in New York. Peppered with parody and pastiche, with additional lyrics by Vivian Wadham, its typical, and often cynical, view of the ups and downs of show business was accompanied by a jazzy and sometimes tender score, with Claire Moore, Lon Satton, Kathryn Evans, Jessica Martin and Maurice Clarke forming the CD cast. The musical was revamped in 2006 and retitled "Make Me a Musical". The new version was first staged in San Antonio. You can see excerpts from this production on Youtube:

=== Pride And Prejudice ===
By the time Success! made its debut at the Civic Theatre, Rotherham, in September 1995, Taylor had returned to the classics, in the form of Jane Austen's Pride And Prejudice. With Claire Moore as Elizabeth Bennett and Peter Karrie in the role of Darcy, the concept album also featured Gay Soper, Janet Mooney, James Staddon and Christopher Biggins as Mr. Collins. Stand-out tracks, according to the Virgin Encyclopedia of Film and Stage Music (VEFSM), were considered to be "Through The Eyes Of A Child" "Good Breeding" and "Thank God They're Married". Pride And Prejudice was introduced to US audiences, complete with five new songs, by the Public Theatre Company of Peoria, Illinois, in January 1995. Taylor's musical interpretation of the Austen novel was considered to be closer to its source than the 1959 Broadway version (see VEFSM), First Impressions (Austen's original title for the book), which starred Hermione Gingold. By 2012 there had been more than 30 productions of the show worldwide in the US, UK, Germany, Australia, Ireland, New Zealand, Brazil and the USA. You can see scenes from the world premiere production at the Madison Theatre in Peoria, Illinois, on Youtube:

=== Nosferatu the Vampire ===
This production, (with additional lyrics by Eric Vickers), included numbers such as "Wild Talk Of Vampires", "And Sheep Shall Not Safely Graze", "Worms Feed On My Brains" "Ship Of The Dead" "Blasphemy" and "Somewhere At The Edges Of Creation". Once again, the album cast was led by Claire Moore (singer) (as Mina) and Peter Karrie (as Nosferatu), supported by Mario Frangoulis, former pop star Mark Wynter, Barry James, Annalene Beechey and Simon Burke. The world premiere was staged at the Madison Theatre, Peoria, Illinois, in September 1995, and the show had its first European performances a month later in Eastbourne. The work has been translated into German, Spanish and Hungarian. Derek Berlin won an excellence award from the Alamo Theater Arts Council for his performance in the title role in a production in San Antonio in 2015. You can see an introduction on Youtube: (from the world premiere production in Peoria, Illinois)

=== Much Ado ===
Having achieved considerable success with his adaptations on Brontë and Austen, Taylor looked to William Shakespeare's Much Ado About Nothing, abbreviated to Much Ado (additional lyrics: Vickers). The CD cast included Paul McGann (Benedick), Claire Moore (Beatrice), Simon Burke (Claudio), Janet Mooney (Hero), Barry James (Leonato), David Pendelbury (Dogberry) and Peter Karrie (Don John). Songs included "If I Could Write A Sonnet", "I'll Never Love Again", "The Sweetest Kiss", "Now I Hear Symphonies" and "This Strange Affliction Called Love" as well as the humorous "The Officers Of The Watch" and "Never Satisfied". It had its world premiere at Stratford on Avon, birthplace of Shakespeare, in 1996, and had its Continental European premiere in Budapest, Hungary, in 2006. The work was translated by Lőrincz Levente, directed by Benkő Péter, and the main roles were played by Udvarias Anna (Beatrice), Lőrincz Levente (Benedick), Bardóczy Attila (Don Pedro), Czakó Ádám (Claudio), Zseni Zsuzsa (Hero), Fekete István (Leonato), Monori Balázs (Dogberry), Cservenák Vilmos (Don John).

=== Millennium Suite ===
As the 1990s drew to a close, Taylor, in collaboration with orchestrator Gareth Price, attempted "to portray some of the key developments in the advance of civilization over the past 1,000 years" via his Millennium Suite. Performed on CD by the Polish State Philharmonic Orchestra of Latowice, conducted by Jerzy Swoboda, the suite consisted of "The Birth Of Chivalry" "The Age Of Oppression" "The Enlightenment" "The Road To Democracy" and "The Triumph of Democracy".

=== Passion's Progress ===
Encouraged by his latest reviews, Taylor composed another symphonic work, Passion's Progress, a suite of ten pieces tracing the development of a romantic relationship.

After featuring on the majority of Taylor's concept albums, Claire Moore, who has starred in the West End in shows such as Aspects Of Love and The Phantom Of The Opera, released the solo CDs, "Songs From The Musicals Of Bernard J. Taylor" and "Child Of The Earth".

=== Liberty: The Siege of the Alamo ===
The end of the decade saw the creation of Liberty: The Siege of the Alamo, which had its world premiere at the Josephine Theater in San Antonio in 2000. It was translated into Spanish in 2003 by the Mexican playwright Erick Merino, who also translated Nosferatu in 1998.

=== Snow White and The Evil Queen ===
Around 2004 Taylor began work on a series of four comic operas using the music of classical composers whose music was out of copyright. Taylor said he hoped to bring the music of the classical composers to a wider audience through these works. The first of these was "Snow White and The Evil Queen", which takes the classic fairy tale and gives the "Evil Queen" a more central role. Instead of a "mirror mirror on the wall", the story features a masochistic hairdresser who acts as the queen's stylist as well as her vanity mirror. The show uses the music of Beethoven and a section of his Violin Concerto becomes a Snow White song – "No More Miss Nice Girl" – while his 5th Symphony is used for the song "Snow White Must Die". A recording of the show was made at the J.B. Sowards Theatre in Ashland, Kentucky, in 2010 and featured on YouTube:

=== The Corporate Pirate of Penzance ===
For this show, completed in 2007, Taylor took a number of the most popular songs of Gilbert and Sullivan and incorporated them into a more modern story of a corporate mogul (a Franchise King, also known as the Corporate Pirate of Penzance) who is hoping his daughter will marry into the British aristocracy, and a penniless young poet who falls in love with the daughter. The show uses music from Pirates of Penzance, H.M.S. Pinafore, The Mikado, Iolanthe, Trial by Jury and The Gondoliers, mixing the music of Arthur Sullivan and the words of W.S. Gilbert with lyrics that reflect the modernized narrative. You can hear a song from the show, sung by Joshua Goldberg, on Youtube:

=== Cinderella's Christmas Makeover ===
In 2008 Taylor began to revamp the Cinderella fairy tale using the music of Leo Delibes, W.A. Mozart, J.S. Bach, Jules Massenet, Carl Maria von Weber, Antonín Dvořák, Luigi Boccherini, Edvard Grieg, Josef Haydn, Felix Mendelssohn, Frédéric Chopin, Jacques Offenbach, P.I. Tchaikovsky, and Camille St Saens. He also composed four additional pieces of music. In Taylor's version, Cinderella is given a make-over for a reality show and gets to meet a prince who falls immediately in love with her. But Cinderella rejects the prince because she is disturbed by his obsession with whether or not her feet will fit a glass slipper. She falls for a penniless courtier who rescues her from the slave traders to whom her stepmother tries to sell her. The show ends with the couple entering and winning a national talent show. You can see/hear two songs from the show on Youtube:

=== The Marsh King's Daughter ===
One of Hans Christian Andersen's lesser-known fairy tales is considerably expanded and re-worked by Taylor in a comic opera using the music of Wolfgang Amadeus Mozart. This was completed in 2010. All four comic operas, plus two plays, were published in Britain by Stagescripts Ltd in 2010. Here is one of the songs from the show:

=== Scott, Zelda and Hemingway in Purgatory (formerly entitled "Road to Madness") ===
Completed at the end of 2012, it is a chamber musical/opera about the life of F. Scott Fitzgerald and his relationships with Zelda Sayre and Ernest Hemingway. Fitzgerald is interviewed after his death and relives some of the key moments in his life. It has a cast of four. It was produced in San Antonio in 2015 and won an award for original musical score from the Alamo Theater Arts Council, as well as two performance awards. You can hearan introduction to the musical/opera on Youtube:

=== Rock n Roll Cafe ===
Begun in 2012, the libretto and songs were completed at the beginning of 2013. It is about the life of the young in a mid-size town during the heyday of rock n' roll.

=== Backstage at Oz ===
A comedy musical about the backstage antics of the actors taking part in a production of The Wizard of Oz. A production in San Antonio in 2017 won an award for the musical score from the Alamo Theater Arts Council. You can see excerpts from this production on Youtube:

=== New Guy at School ===
Completed at the beginning of 2013 in tandem with Rock n Roll Cafe, this is an updated version of Tom Brown's Schooldays, the classic 19th Century novel by Thomas Hughes (which created the blueprint for all school stories that followed, including Harry Potter). It features all the main characters from the original novel, but in this version it is set in a modern co-ed school. It was written especially for school productions.

=== Transformation ===
The musical describes the transformation of a shy and introverted man into a public figure. The score was highly praised by a number of people involved in theatre and a set was specially designed for the show by the internationally renowned set designer Jeremy Railton. An introduction to the show can be seen on Youtube:

=== A Christmas Carol ===
An introduction to the musical version of A Christmas Carol was posted to Youtube in September, 2023: The musical sticks fairly closely to Charles Dickens's novella but condenses some of the scenes and excludes the necessity of certain elements (like some of the Cratchit children apart from Timy Tim), and the giant figure that requires an actor to walk on stilts. This reduces the size of the cast and makes it easier to stage. The music is a blend of traditional Christmas carols and songs – mainly with new or altered lyrics – and new songs reflecting the narrative progression and the characters.

=== Theatre for Scandal ===
Adapted from Taylor's stage play that won three excellence awards (for script and two actor performance awards) in 2017 from the Alamo Theater Arts Council in San Antonio. The show is set backstage and begins with a group of actors discussing a rumor that one of the most flamboyantly "camp" actors is pretending to be gay while actually straight. A recording of the musical was completed in August 2024 and uploaded to Youtube:

=== The Love of Becky Sharpe ===
A musical loosely based on W.M. Thackeray's movel Vanity Fair. Completed in 2023. The narrative takes four of the most prominent characters in Thackeray's novel (most notably Becky Sharpe) and puts them in a modern context. You can see and hear an introduction to the musical on Youtube:

== Plays ==
Taylor has written numerous plays, mostly between 2010 and 2020.

=== Living with Ghosts ===
This tells the story of an introverted and burned-out writer who ends a hollow relationship with a married woman at the same time as he rents a room in his city apartment to an extrovert out-of-towner named Rachel, a generation younger than himself. He is torn between his attraction to her, his self-consciousness and his fear of involvement. The show was first performed in embryo in San Antonio, Texas, at the beginning of 2012. It has since been extensively revised.

=== Haunted ===
Newlyweds Eddie and Janine buy a house in the country. The house has been untenanted for a few years and the furniture of the previous owner are covered with dust sheets. They learn that the house was owned a couple who are now dead. Then they learn disturbing learn disturbing facts about the house's history. Things come to a head one night when an explosive incident leads to an exposure of the true nature of events. This is also available as a screenplay.

=== Appalachian Ghosts ===
A take of entrapment based on incidents that happened to the playwright when he went to live with a younger woman in the Appalachian foorhills

=== The Lady of Shalott ===
This play with music was published by Stagescripts in the UK as "Hear a Song That Echoes. Inspired by the epic poem by Alfred Lord Tennyson, it tells the story of a young literary professor who keeps the world at a distance until she is challenged by the passion of a former student. It received its first try-out in San Antonio in 2015.

=== The Deconstruction of Doctor Gerald Ackerman ===
Completed in 2011, this tells of a prominent psychiatrist who is put through sensory deprivation and "deconstructed" by a friend of the daughter he abused as a child. It is adapted from a novel that Taylor has subsequently withdrawn from circulation.

=== The Deliverer ===
Adapted from another novel that Taylor has withdrawn from circulation, it is about a man who kills women he meets through the internet in the belief that he is doing them a favor by ending their miserable lives and sending them to a better place. The play was completed early in 2012.

=== The Kindness of Strangers/Tennessee Williams: Portrait of a Gay Icon ===
In 2018, solo theatre artist Jade Esteban Estrada starred in the San Antonio production of Taylor's The Kindness of Strangers, a one-person show about the life of Tennessee Williams. Playwright Mark Leonard lauded Estrada's "brilliant, energetic portrayal of Williams. Both Taylor and Estrada deftly sidestep the cloying cliches to offer a gripping and vastly entertaining hour or so in the company of an American genius bent on self-destruction. Their Tennessee has heart, soul, rage and wit and it is well worth spending an evening entranced and entertained in his company." The work was revived at the Sargent Theatre in New York in June, 2025, under the title of "Tennessee Williams: Portrait of a Gay Icon", with New York actor John Stillwaggon in the title role. Critic Bill Eisenring, in the review magazine Showtones, wrote: "Playwright Bernard J. Taylor has given us a really well written solo play exploring the life of Tennessee Williams, not so much as a playwright, but as a damaged child and man. John Stillwaggon brings Williams to life through 90 minutes telling the story to the audience from “Williams” alcohol and drug addled perspective as an older man. Corolyn Dellinger does a wonderful job moving Stillwaggon on the stage."

=== Theatre for Scandal ===
Theatre for Scandal is a comedy loosely inspired by Sheridan's School for Scandal. When Anthony Hamilton hears there is a rumor that he is secretly straight, he claims to be outraged by the rumor and threatens to sue. His attention is soon diverted, however, when a female member of the group breaks down after being unceremoniously dumped by her lothario boyfriend, Alfonso, for another woman. Hamilton comes to her aid and promises to teach the jilter a lesson. He investigates the jilter's movement and learns that the lothario meets regularly with his new girlfriend at the Cozy Corner coffee bar. At one of these rendezvous Hamilton appears and accuses Alfonso of two-timing him with a woman. Alfonso is outraged at the suggestion that he and Hamilton (who have never met before) are lovers. He threatens Hamilton, who in turn eggs him on and warns Alfonso that he has a black belt in karate. Horrified by the prospect of losing a physical battle to such an effeminate and smaller person, Alfonso backs off. The play ends with the jilted girlfriend and Hamilton embarking on a new kind of relationship for both of them. TA production in San Antonio in 2017 won two performance awards and an "excellence" award for script from the Alamo City Arts Council

=== Waltzing in The Dark ===
A play about Alzheimers that was first performed at the Overtime Theater in San Antonio in 2016, winning two awards from the Alamo Theater Arts Council. The play is based on real incidents and tells of a retired doctor dealing with a wife who is dsiuffering from early onset Alzheimer's. As music is one of the few things that holds her attention, the doctor commissions a piece of music (a waltz) as her anniversary present. Taylor composed and recorded a waltz for the play. Whitney Marlett played the role of the Alzheimer's victim in the world premiere production at the Overtime Theater in San Antonio in 2016 and won an excellence award from the Alamo Theater Arts Council.

=== The Last Days of Oscar Wilde ===
Marc Daratt won an Alamo Theater Arts Council award for his performance as Oscar WSilde in the 2019 production at the Overtime Theater in San Antonio in 2018. The play is set in Paris where an impoverished Oscar Wilde ekes out his final days with the support of the few friends who have remained steadfast in their devotion to the exiled Wilde.
