= Orlando Pops Orchestra =

Musical artist

The Orlando Pops Orchestra was an American orchestra based in Orlando, Florida, that specializes in playing classical and film score music; they have been in business from 1993 to 2011.

== Discography ==
- The Music, The Magic: Andrew Lloyd Webber (1996)
- Andrew Llody Webber -- Evita (1996)
- That's Entertainment, Vol. 2 (1996)
- Fright Night (1996)
- A. L. Webber Gold (1996)
- The Best of John Williams (1996)
- American Thunder: The Power and the Glory (1996)
- Jesus Christ Superstar Nightlights (1996)
- The Magic of Andrew Lloyd Webber (1997)
- The Orlando Pops Orchestra Sampler (1997)
- A Night at the Movies (1997)
- God Bless America: A Salute to America's Great Composers (1997)
- John Williams: The Dream Goes On (1997)
- Hooray! For Hollywood (1998)
- The Magic of John Williams (1998)
- Horror Classics (1998)
- Cine de Terror (1998)
- A Salute to George Gershwin (1998)
- The Orlando Pops Orchestra Plays Famous Film Scores (2010)
- Monster Mash and Other Songs of Horror (2011)
