= Our Kind of Love (Andrew Lloyd Webber song) =

Song
- Songwriters: Andrew Lloyd Webber, Ben Elton

Our Kind of Love is a ballad from the 2000 musical The Beautiful Game by Andrew Lloyd Webber. The lyrics were written by Ben Elton.

Lloyd Webber used a Giacomo Puccini-style melody for this song, which he had previously used for the song "The Heart is Slow to Learn" in the 1990s, part of an intended sequel to the Webber musical Phantom of the Opera. The track was recorded by Kiri Te Kanawa in 1998. She performed it live the same year, as part of a concert to celebrate Lloyd Webber's fiftieth birthday which was later released on video and DVD. Elaine Paige performed it during a concert produced by The Really Useful Group in Beijing in 2001, which was also released on DVD.

Lloyd Webber used the tune a third time for the song "Love Never Dies" from the 2010 musical of the same name, which finally served as a sequel to Phantom.

== Single tracklisting and formats ==
In 2000, Telstar Records released "Our Kind of Love" performed by Hannah Waddingham, credited on the recordings simply as Hannah. The singles featured tracks from the cast recording of the original London production of The Beautiful Game, in which Waddingham appeared. She also performed a live version of the song on BBC Television's Parkinson, following an interview with Lloyd Webber and Elton.

Simon Franglen and Angela Lupino produced the single version. Rick Nowels and Charlie Judge contributed a remixed version for the enhanced single. The Andrew Lloyd Webber version and the tracks from the cast recording were produced by Lloyd Webber and Nigel Wright.

Perhaps due to an error in the production process, the first two tracks on the enhanced single are monoaural, rather than in stereo as would have been customary by 2000. The enhanced single also features a video produced to market the single, embedded into the CD-ROM element of the disc.

=== UK CD Single ===
1. Our Kind of Love
2. Our Kind of Love [Andrew Lloyd Webber version]
3. The Beautiful Game Overture

=== UK CD Enhanced Single ===
1. Our Kind of Love [Nowels and Judge Mix]
2. Our Kind of Love [Acoustic Version]
3. Viva! The Beautiful Game
4. Video CD-ROM
