= Kevin Colson =

Australian actor (1937–2018)

- Born: 28 August 1937; Sydney, New South Wales, Australia
- Died: 18 April 2018 (aged 80)
- Occupations: Stage actor, film and television actor
- Years active: 1960–1969, 1985–2018
- Relatives: Phil B. Colson (brother); Sia (niece)

Kevin Colson (28 August 1937 – 18 April 2018) was an Australian stage, film and television actor. He is known for playing Sir George Dillingham in the musical Aspects of Love, for which he received a Tony Award nomination, and Cliff in the original London production of Cabaret opposite Judi Dench.

Colson was a television presenter and stage actor in Sydney before moving to London. He left acting for 16 years from 1969, but returned to the stage in 1985.

== Career ==
=== Early career ===
Colson began his career as a television announcer on a religious program on Sundays, and then became the Seven Network station compère and hosted Room for Two in 1959. His first theatre role was as a rancher in The Pleasure of His Company at the Theatre Royal in 1960, and he had a part in The Glass Menagerie for the Elizabethan Theatre Trust in Sydney in 1961. He starred in French musical Irma La Douce with Judy Bruce from May 1961 as her young boyfriend. It was his first professional musical role, having previously played straight theatre roles. In October 1962, he starred as the hero in Carnival at Her Majesty's Theatre, and in 1963 he played the juvenile lead in Noël Coward's Sail Away at Her Majesty's Theatre; Coward oversaw the rehearsals. In 1964, appearances with the Union Theatre Repertory Company – later the Melbourne Theatre Company – were his Hamlet, Nick in Who's Afraid of Virginia Woolf?, in the Australian premiere of the Arthur Miller play After the Fall and a role in And the Big Men Fly as the hero's neighbour.

In 1965, Colson moved to London to train, but was immediately offered the part of Robert Browning (replacing Keith Michell) in Robert and Elizabeth, which he performed for a year and a half at the Lyric Theatre. He then played Cliff Bradshaw to Judi Dench's Sally Bowles in the original London production of Cabaret at the Palace Theatre . He retired from acting in 1969.

=== Later career ===
From 1970 to 1985, he ran an oil business and a TV production company, both ultimately unsuccessful. After the oil business ended in 1985 he appeared in Stephen Sondheim's Follies, and then as CIA agent Walter DeCourcey in the original London production of Tim Rice's musical Chess.

In 1989, Colson starred in the Andrew Lloyd Webber musical Aspects of Love with Ann Crumb. Colson was originally the understudy for actor Roger Moore in the part of George Dillingham, but Moore had reservations over his own singing voice and pulled out a month before the opening. Colson was nominated for a Tony Award in June 1990 when the play reached Broadway. In 1991, he played Noah in Children of Eden at the Prince Edward Theatre in London and Max von Mayerling in the Sydmonton Festival workshop of Sunset Boulevard. In 1998, he was a supporting lead in Maddie and he played Daddy Warbucks in Annie.

He played Joey Bishop in Rat Pack Confidential at the Whitehall Theatre in 2003, followed by The Woman in White with Roger Allam in 2003 and Murderous Instincts as the butler Adolfo at the Savoy Theatre in 2004. In 2006 he played the leads in Dominic Mitchell's Acquaintances. He has appeared in many productions at the Finborough Theatre in London, including The Destiny of Me (2002), Allport’s Revenge (2004), Van Badham's The Gabriels. (2006), Blackwater Angel (2006), Mass Appeal (2006), The Beautiful People (2008) and His Greatness (2010). He was Rodion in 2007's Old World. His last appearance was in 2014 in The Last Confession in Sydney, alongside David Suchet.

== Personal life ==
Colson came from Sydney, and his father and brother were taxi drivers. He was previously married, shortly after he took a break from acting in 1969. Australian singer-songwriter, Sia is his niece, the daughter of his brother, Phil B. Colson, who is a singer, guitarist & composer.

In 2003, Colson claimed that he was homeless after he sold his place in Australia and gave his house to his ex-wife.

== Film and television roles ==
=== Film ===
Colson had roles in the films Khartoum, Star, Nightwatch, and Trapped in Space.

=== Television ===
Colson had roles on the television series Man at the Top, Spytrap, First Among Equals, The Woman He Loved, Poor Little Rich Girl, Executive Stress, and Crossroads.

== Discography ==
- Jerome Kern: Show Boat, conducted by John McGlinn, EMI, 1988
