= Diana Morrison =

British singer

Diana Morrison (born 1969) is a British stage, television and film actress.

== Career summary ==
Diana Morrison was born in Swansea, Wales, but grew up in London, England. While training at the Arts Educational Schools, London, she danced with the Festival Ballet (now the English National Ballet) in The Nutcracker and was a member of the National Youth Theatre and the National Youth Choir.

She played the principal role of Jenny in Andrew Lloyd Webber's musical Aspects of Love throughout the whole original London West End production run at the Prince of Wales Theatre. Morrison sang the role of Jenny on the original London cast recording and also recorded a duet from the show "The First Man You Remember" with Michael Ball. It was released as a single and has been included on many compilation albums, including Andrew Lloyd Webber 60 and Andrew Lloyd Webber - The Premiere Collection Encore.

She played Madeline Bassett in the 1996 revival cast of Andrew Lloyd Webber and Alan Ayckbourn's musical, By Jeeves, directed by Ayckbourn at The Stephen Joseph Theatre, Scarborough, North Yorkshire and then at the Duke of York's and Lyric Theatres in London's West End.

Cinema credits include Quills directed by Philip Kaufman, playing Mademoiselle Renard, the victim of an execution.

Morrison has also appeared in numerous TV dramas, stage plays and musicals, ranging from the 1988 BBC TV Serial The Watch House to the 2001 revival of the Feydeau farce Horse and Carriage at the West Yorkshire Playhouse, Leeds.

In 2008, she guest starred in the Doctor Who audio adventure, "The Condemned".

In 2009, Morrison composed music for film and television with Bob Kraushaar.
