= The Premiere Collection: The Best of Andrew Lloyd Webber =

Compilation album by Andrew Lloyd Webber
- Released: 1988
- Genre: Classical crossover
- Label: Really Useful; Polydor; MCA
- Producer: Andrew Lloyd Webber (also exec. producer); Tim Rice; Mike Batt; David R. Murray

The Premiere Collection: The Best of Andrew Lloyd Webber is a 1988 compilation album, bringing together some of composer Andrew Lloyd Webber's best known compositions at the time of release. It includes songs from the musicals The Phantom of the Opera, Tell Me on a Sunday, Evita, Cats, Jesus Christ Superstar, Starlight Express and Requiem. Co-writers of the songs include Tim Rice, Don Black, Richard Stilgoe, Charles Hart and Trevor Nunn.

The album spent two weeks at number one in the UK Compilation Chart in January 1989.

It was released by Really Useful Records and Polydor Records on LP (with a gatefold cover), cassette and CD. A follow-up album, The Premiere Collection Encore, was released in 1992.

== Track listing ==
All music written by Andrew Lloyd Webber.

Side one

No.	Title	Lyrics	Origin	Length
1.	"The Phantom of the Opera" (Sarah Brightman & Steve Harley)	Charles Hart; Richard Stilgoe; Mike Batt	The Phantom of the Opera	4:37
2.	"Take That Look Off Your Face" (Marti Webb)	Don Black	Tell Me on a Sunday	3:56
3.	"All I Ask of You" (Sarah Brightman & Cliff Richard)	Hart; Stilgoe	The Phantom of the Opera	4:05
4.	"Don't Cry for Me, Argentina" (Julie Covington)	Tim Rice	Evita	4:02
5.	"Magical Mr. Mistoffelees" (Paul Nicholas)	T. S. Eliot	Cats	5:10
6.	"Four Variations for Cello & Orchestra" (Julian Lloyd Webber)	―	Song and Dance	4:12
7.	"Superstar" (Murray Head & cast)	Rice	Jesus Christ Superstar	3:56

Side two

No.	Title	Lyrics	Origin	Length
1.	"Memory" (Elaine Paige)	Eliot; Trevor Nunn	Cats	4:26
2.	"Starlight Express" (Ray Shell)	Stilgoe	Starlight Express	5:02
3.	"Tell Me on a Sunday" (Marti Webb)	Black	Tell Me on a Sunday	3:30
4.	"The Music of the Night" (Michael Crawford)	Hart; Stilgoe	The Phantom of the Opera	5:12
5.	"Another Suitcase in Another Hall" (Barbara Dickson)	Rice	Evita	3:18
6.	"I Don't Know How to Love Him" (Yvonne Elliman)	Rice	Jesus Christ Superstar	3:56
7.	"Pie Jesu" (Sarah Brightman & Paul Miles-Kingston)	Lloyd Webber; traditional	Requiem	3:58

== Personnel ==
Adapted from the album's liner notes.

=== Musicians ===
- Royal Philharmonic Orchestra – orchestra (side two: track 4)
- David Caddick – conductor (side two: track 4)
- Winchester Cathedral Choir – choir (side two: track 7)
- Martin Neary – director (side two: track 7)
- James Lancelot – organ (side two: track 7)
- English Chamber Orchestra – orchestra (side two: track 7)
- Lorin Maazel – conductor (side two: track 7)

=== Technical ===
- Andrew Lloyd Webber – producer (side one: tracks 2–7; side two: tracks 1–6), executive producer (side one: track 1)
- Tim Rice – producer (side one: tracks 4 & 7; side two: tracks 5 & 6)
- Mike Batt – producer (side one: track 1)
- David R. Murray – producer (side two: track 7)
- Martin Levan – engineer (side one: track 3; side two: tracks 2 & 4)
- David Hamilton-Smith – engineer (side two: track 1)
- J. L. – sleeve design
- Carlos Olms – digital engineer

== Charts ==
Chart performance for The Premiere Collection: The Best of Andrew Lloyd Webber
Chart (1988–1994)	Peak position
Australian Albums (ARIA)	1
New Zealand Albums (RMNZ)	1
Swedish Albums (Sverigetopplistan)	16
UK Albums (OCC)	100

== Certifications and sales ==
Certifications for The Premiere Collection: The Best of Andrew Lloyd Webber
Region	Certification	Certified units/sales
Australia (ARIA)	2× Platinum	200,000
Canada (Music Canada)	Platinum	100,000^{^}
United Kingdom (BPI)	3× Platinum	900,000^{^}
^{^} Shipments figures based on certification alone.
