= Peter Karrie =

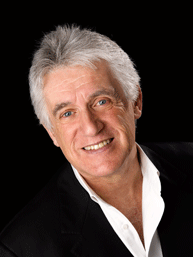

Background information
- Birth name: Peter Karrie
- Born: The Vale of Glamorgan, Wales, United Kingdom
- Genres: Showtunes, Big Band
- Occupation(s): Actor, singer, entertainer
- Instrument: Vocals
- Years active: 1975–present
- Labels: Fog & Gas, FlyRy Records

Peter Karrie (born 10 August 1946, originally Peter Karagianis) is a Welsh singer and an honorary fellow of the Royal Welsh College of Music and Drama. He played the lead role in the Andrew Lloyd Webber musical The Phantom of the Opera in various productions such as London (1991,1992), Toronto (1992,1994,1997-1998), various locations with the Canadian International Touring Company (1995,1997) and the end of the UK Millennium Tour (2000). In 1994 and 1995 members of the Phantom of the Opera Appreciation Society voted him their favourite Phantom.

Karrie was brought up in Wales, where he had radio and television shows on BBC Wales. He began his career as the lead singer of pop group Peter and the Wolves, and went on to star in several West End musical productions, including Les Misérables (as Jean Valjean) and Chess (as Freddie Trumper). He also played Che in the UK tour of Evita, and played Daddy Warbucks in Annie, Fagin in Oliver! and Tevye in Fiddler on the Roof for Aberystwyth Arts Centre, he also has played Judas Iscariot in Jesus Christ Superstar at the Palace Theatre. In 2005 he starred with Shan Côthi in the Mal Pope musical Amazing Grace at the Wales Millennium Centre for the Wales Theatre Company. He performed alongside John Owen Jones and Nic Greenshields in the one-off Three Phantoms concert in aid of George Thomas Hospice Care. He also created roles in three Bernard J. Taylor musicals, and the title role of Nosferatu was written for him. In 2012 he appeared in the 33rd edition of The Royal Nova Scotia International Tattoo in Halifax, Nova Scotia, Canada, where he and Brenna Conrad performed a Cole Porter tribute and a rendition of Phantom of the Opera.

Married with six children, Karrie is an ambassador for Bobath Children's Therapy Centre Wales, a registered charity based in Cardiff which provides specialist Bobath therapy to children from Wales who have cerebral palsy.

In 2013 he resigned his honorary fellowship at Aberystwyth University in protest, he said, at its apparent determination to "ruin one of the finest arts centres in the country", and because he was "unable to support any regime that can treat their staff in such a cruel and appalling manner."

In conjunction with The Blaenavon Workmen's Hall, one of the finest remaining mining institute's in South East Wales, Peter has written and will produce and perform in a new Pantomime within the hall's 350-seat Theatre in December 2017. Peter's version of "Puss in Boots" will feature both professional and local amateur performers selected from his musical theatre drama school – The Blaenavon Academy of Arts.

== Solo albums ==
- Theatrically Yours
- Peter Karrie Unmasked
- The Impossible Dream
- On The Other Side Of Love
- Standing Alone

== Cast recordings ==
- Pride and Prejudice
- Nosferatu: the Vampire
- Amazing Grace
- Contender
- Much Ado
