= Aspects of Love =

1989 musical by Andrew Lloyd Webber

- Original West End Logo
- Music: Andrew Lloyd Webber
- Lyrics: Don Black; Charles Hart
- Book: Andrew Lloyd Webber
- Basis: Aspects of Love by David Garnett
- Productions: 1989 West End; 1990 Broadway; 1991 Edmonton chamber version; 2007 UK Tour; 2010 London revival; 2012–2013 Dutch Tour; 2018 Manchester; 2019 London Revival; 2023 West End Revival

Aspects of Love is a musical with music and book by Andrew Lloyd Webber, and lyrics by Don Black and Charles Hart. It is based on the 1955 novel by David Garnett.

The piece focuses on the romantic entanglements of actress Rose Vibert, her admiring fan Alex Dillingham, his underage cousin Jenny, his uncle George, and George's mistress, sculptor Giulietta Trapani, over a period of 17 years. The "aspects" of the title refers to the many forms that love takes in the show: love between couples, both as romantic infatuation and as married people; children and their parents; and hints of same-sex attraction (Giulietta and Rose).

Most of the musical is sung, making the show sung-through with only minor amounts of dialogue.

Lloyd Webber was introduced to Aspects of Love in 1979, when he and Tim Rice were approached to write a few songs for a proposed film version. When nothing came of it, he suggested to Trevor Nunn that they collaborate on a stage adaptation. In 1983, they presented a cabaret of numbers they had written, but it was not until five years later that they tackled the project in earnest. The musical features the song "Love Changes Everything".

As with many of his shows, Lloyd Webber first presented Aspects of Love in a workshop presentation as part of his Sydmonton Festival (July 1988). The cast was led by Michael Ball as Alex, Susannah Fellows as Rose, Dinsdale Landen as George, Grania Renihan as Giulietta and Diana Morrison as Jenny.

== Productions ==
=== West End (1989–1992) ===
The West End production, directed by Trevor Nunn and choreographed by Gillian Lynne, musical direction by Michael Reed, opened on April 17, 1989, at the Prince of Wales Theatre, where it ran for 1,325 performances. The original cast included Ann Crumb as Rose Vibert, Michael Ball as Alex Dillingham, Kevin Colson as George Dillingham, Kathleen Rowe McAllen as Giulietta Trapani, Diana Morrison as Jenny Dillingham and Sally Smith as The Chanteuse. Roger Moore was due to star as George in the production but left two weeks before opening night. He later stated in an interview he was unable to cope with the technical side of singing in Aspects of Love, and the production required someone with experience of singing with orchestras. Following his departure, his understudy Kevin Colson took over the role. During the run, the role of Rose Vibert was also played by Susannah Fellows, Carol Duffy, Helen Hobson, Clare Burt, and Sarah Brightman; Alex Dillingham by David Greer, David Malek and Michael Praed; Giulietta Trapani by Becky Norman and Grania Renihan.

=== Broadway (1990–1991) ===
The Broadway production, with the same creative team and the four leading members of the London cast, opened on April 8, 1990, at the Broadhurst Theatre and closed on March 2, 1991, after 377 performances and 22 previews. John Cullum joined the cast later in the run, and the closing cast starred Sarah Brightman and Barrie Ingham. The reviews were lacklustre and New York Times critic Frank Rich wrote in a negative review "Whether Aspects of Love is a musical for people is another matter." When the musical closed, the entire $8 million investment was lost, which, according to The New York Times, made it "perhaps the greatest flop in Broadway history".

=== UK Tour and West End Revival (1993) ===
In 1993, Really Useful Group and Apollo Leisure breathed life into the show with a new production directed by Gale Edwards, with designs by Roger Kirk, and choreography by Jo Anne Robinson. The show opened at the Alexandra Theatre, Birmingham, toured the UK and then headed into the West End and re-opened at the shows original venue, the Prince of Wales Theatre, London. There were many differences from the original, especially in the stage design, which used a revolve and beautiful butterfly gauzes to help the flow from scene to scene. Kathryn Evans played Rose, with Alexander Hanson as Alex, Gary Bond as George, Lottie Mayor as Jenny and Karen Skinns as Giulietta. The cast also included Paul Bentley, Benjamin Lush, Helen Viner-Slater, Alisdair Harvey, Nicola Dawn, Martin Callaghan, Russell Wilcox, Heather Davies, Nathan Harmer, Leslie Meadows, Gail-Marie Shapter, Myles Faraday, Kate Marsden, Natalie Holton, Angela Lloyd and Peter King. A further tour of the production in 1994 was led by Kevin Colson as George, Anne Wood as Rose, Jay Marcus as Alex, Jacinta Whyte as Giulietta and Elizabeth Price as Jenny.

=== Subsequent Productions ===
In 1991, a 'chamber' version of the show with Keith Michell as George was mounted in Canada. It subsequently toured in America and a similar production was staged in Australia. Aspects of Love was also produced in Japan, the Philippines, Hungary, Finland, and Denmark.

A production directed by Gale Edwards toured Australia in the early 1990s. It starred Peter Cousens as Alex, Delia Hannah as Rose, and Martin Crewes as Hugo. It also featured Kevin Colson reprising his role of George.

The musical toured the United States from 1992 to 1993. The cast starred Ron Bohmer as Alex, Linda Balgord as Rose, Keith Michell as George, and Kelli James Chase as Giulietta. Sarah Brightman reprised her performance as Rose at the Los Angeles stop at the Wilshire Theatre.

A new UK tour – the first production in 15 years – began on 31 August 2007. It starred David Essex as George Dillingham, with Matt Rawle as Alex, Shona Lindsay as Rose, and Poppy Tierney as Giulietta. The production was directed by Nikolai Foster, with musical direction by Andrew J. Smith. It opened at the Theatre Royal, Newcastle upon Tyne, and toured for 36 weeks through 8 December 2007. Rawle was replaced by Tim Rogers.

The show played a limited engagement at The Joburg Theatre in Johannesburg, South Africa from May 22 to June 28, 2009. The touring production was re-directed by Nikolai Foster and starred Samantha Peo, Robert Finlayson, Angela Kilian and Keith Smith.

A London revival ran at the Menier Chocolate Factory from July 15 to September 11, 2010, with new direction by Trevor Nunn. The cast featured Dave Willetts as George, Rosalie Craig as Giulietta, Katherine Kingsley as Rose, and Michael Arden as Alex.

In 2012, a Dutch production toured the Netherlands, produced by Stage Entertainment.

The new 'definitive' script was staged at The Playhouse, Whitley Bay from February to March 2014. Produced by Tynemouth Operatic Society, it was the first non-professional staging in the UK to use the new script and full orchestra. It was the first staging in the world of the new 'definitive' version by Lord Lloyd Webber, bringing together elements of several productions to present the show as he wishes to see it staged.

In July 2018, a new revival opened at the Hope Mill Theatre, Manchester before transferring to the Southwark Playhouse London in January 2019. It featured Kelly Price as Rose, Felix Mosse as Alex, Jérôme Pradon as George, Madalena Alberto as Giulietta and Eleanor Walsh as Jenny.

=== Second West End Revival (2023) ===
A West End revival, directed by Jonathan Kent and produced by Nica Burns, opened at the Lyric Theatre, London, on May 12, 2023, for a limited run until November 11. On June 30, 2023 it was announced the production would close nearly three months earlier than originally planned, on August 19. Michael Ball, who played Alex in the original 1989 London production, starred as George, Danielle de Niese as Giulietta. Jamie Bogyo played the role of Alex. Dave Willetts was Ball’s alternate playing the role on Mondays. In this production Alex's song 'Love Changes Everything' was also sung by George, allowing Michael Ball to reprise his signature song from the original production.

== Cast and characters ==
Character	West End	Broadway	First West End Revival	Second West End Revival
Character	1989	1990	1993	2023
Rose Vibert	Ann Crumb	Ann Crumb	Kathryn Evans	Laura Pitt-Pulford
Alex Dillingham	Michael Ball	Michael Ball	Alexander Hanson	Jamie Bogyo
Sir George Dillingham	Kevin Colson	Kevin Colson	Gary Bond	Michael Ball Dave Willetts
Giulietta Trapani	Kathleen Rowe McAllen	Kathleen Rowe McAllen	Karen Skinns	Danielle de Niese
Jenny Dillingham	Diana Morrison	Deanna DuClos	Lottie Mayor	Anna Unwin
Hugo le Meunier	David Greer	Don Goodspeed	James Buller	Vinny Coyle

=== Notable replacements ===
==== West End (1989-1992) ====
- Rose Vibert: Clare Burt, Sarah Brightman, Susanna Fellows, Helen Hobson
- Alex Dillingham: David Malek, Michael Praed

==== Broadway (1990-91) ====
- Rose Vibert: Sarah Brightman
- Alex Dillingham: Marcus Lovett
- Sir George Dillingham: Walter Charles, John Cullum, Barrie Ingham
- Hugo le Meunier: Jonathan Dokuchitz

== Plot ==
=== Act One ===
At a train station in Pau, France in 1964, 34-year-old Alex Dillingham reflects on his love life over the past 17 years ("Love Changes Everything"). A woman (Giulietta Trapani) replies to him that "it's all in the past."

Flashing to 1947, Rose Vibert, a 25-year-old actress, complains that their production of The Master Builder is a flop. The producer, Marcel, tries to placate Rose by introducing her to a fan, 17-year-old Alex ("A Small Theatre in Montpellier"). Alex and Rose have a brief tryst at his uncle George's villa in Pau ("Seeing is Believing", "The House in Pau"). George Dillingham, in Paris with his mistress, Giulietta Trapani, an Italian sculptor, returns to his villa to see for himself what Alex and Rose are doing ("An Art Exhibition in Paris", "A Memory of a Happy Moment"). Rose is attracted to George, who is overcome when he sees Rose dressed in a gown belonging to his beloved late wife, Delia, also an actress, and remarks how much Rose resembles Delia ("In Many Rooms in the House at Pau").

He advises Alex that all good things have to end, and that his interlude with Rose will be a memory. Alex insists that his relationship with Rose is real love ("On the Terrace"). George leaves, and Rose leaves to rejoin Marcel. Alex realizes that Rose had never taken him seriously ("At the House at Pau").

Two years later, Alex, now a soldier, visits his uncle in Paris, and is shocked to find that Rose is now George's mistress. He accuses her of chasing his uncle's money, but Rose protests that she really loves George. She admits that she did love Alex once, and the two, drawn to each other again, fall into bed ("George's Flat in Paris").

The next morning, an agitated Rose tells Alex to leave before George returns. Alex, enraged, pulls out his gun. Rose throws a candlestick at Alex, and the gun goes off, shooting Rose in the arm, and she faints ("First Orchestral Interlude"). After George arrives, he and Alex each try to convince the other that the other is the right man for Rose. George wins the debate, insisting that Alex should begin a new life with Rose, and Alex finally agrees ("She'd Be Far Better Off With You"). George then heads to Venice to see his former mistress, Giulietta. However, Rose orders Alex to leave, having chosen to stay with George. Alex leaves, and Rose and Marcel follow George to Venice. Rose intends to confront Giulietta and reclaim George. In Venice, Giulietta and Rose bond while discussing George's foibles. They both express surprise that the other woman is not at all what they'd imagined. George returns and says that he has lost most of his money ("Stop. Wait. Please").

Rose then asks George to marry her and he agrees. At the wedding, Giulietta shocks everyone by claiming her best man's rights and kissing Rose on the mouth. George, however, is delighted ("A Registry Office").

At "A Military Camp in Malaya", Alex receives a letter from Rose telling him that she married George, and they are expecting a child.

=== Act Two ===
Twelve years later at a theatre in Paris, Rose has risen to stardom and has a young lover, Hugo. Marcel and the rest of the cast celebrate the latest hit (A Month in the Country) ("Leading Lady"), but Rose insists that she must return to the villa at Pau and to her husband George and their 12-year-old daughter, Jenny. Marcel reintroduces her to the 32-year-old Alex ("At the Stage Door"). Rose is delighted and insists that he come with her to Pau. At the villa, Jenny is excited by the prospect of her mother's return. George is happy to see Alex, returning with Rose, and Jenny, who has heard much about him, meets him for the first time. Rose and George insist that Alex should stay with them ("Other Pleasures"). Meanwhile, in Venice, George's former mistress, Giulietta, ponders the meaning of stable, long-lasting love versus romantic infatuation ("There Is More to Love").

Two years later, Alex suggests that Jenny needs a Paris education, which upsets Rose, who suspects that her daughter has developed an unhealthy crush on Alex ("The Garden at Pau (Version 2)"). That evening Jenny appears wearing Delia's gown, much as Rose did ("On the Terrace (Version 2)"); George happily dances with his daughter. Jenny tries to draw Alex into the dance, but Alex politely refuses ("The First Man You Remember"). Later, Jenny and Alex are left alone, and Jenny finally convinces Alex to give her the last dance. Rose catches Jenny clasping Alex in a very adult fashion, and Alex leaves. Jenny tells her mother that Alex is the first to make her feel like a woman. Rose confronts Alex, who admits to having feelings for Jenny, but insists that he would never harm her ("The Vineyard at Pau"). Later, Jenny tells Alex that she loves him. She begs him to be honest, then kisses him ("Up in the Pyrenees").

George plans his wake, insisting that there should be dancing and fun. Rose tells him that he's bound to outlive them all ("George's Study at Pau"). At a circus in Paris, George, Rose, Alex, and Jenny are celebrating Jenny's fifteenth birthday ("Journey of a Lifetime"). George becomes agitated as he watches Jenny talking with Alex ("Falling"). Later, Alex puts Jenny to bed. Jenny tries to convince him that she's really in love with him, but Alex insists that they're just cousins. Jenny falls asleep, and Alex reflects that he knows he must not love her, but cannot help loving her. George overhears Alex and is enraged, suspecting the worst. He collapses, and Alex comes out of Jenny's room to find him dead ("Jenny's Bedroom").

At George's wake, Giulietta gives a eulogy celebrating George's unconventionality and his belief in living life to the fullest ("Hand Me the Wine and Dice"). Giulietta and Alex join in the dancing and are attracted to each other, eventually trysting in a hayloft. Jenny spies on them, while Marcel tries to comfort the grieving Rose. Alex, alone with Giulietta, wonders how to end his relationship kindly with Jenny. He returns to the villa for one last confrontation. Alex tries to explain to Jenny that their relationship was unnatural. She reminds him that he was only seventeen when he met Rose, and that she is no younger than Shakespeare's Juliet ("On the Terrace (Version 3)").

Rose bids Alex farewell, but then breaks down and begs Alex not to leave her. Alex, unsure of how to reply, leaves ("Anything But Lonely"). At the train station at Pau, as Alex and Giulietta wait for the train, Giulietta wonders what will happen when Jenny reaches legal majority in three years. Alex, unable to reply, reflects once more on how love changes everything ("It Won't be Long till Jenny's a Woman").

== Song list ==
Act I

1. "Love Changes Everything" – Alex
2. "A Small Theatre in Montphile" – Rose, Marcel, Actress and Alex
3. "Parlez-vous Français?" – Crooner, Alex, Rose, Marcel, Waiter and Actors
4. "The Railway Station" – Alex and Rose
5. "Seeing is Believing" – Alex and Rose
6. "The House in Pau" – Alex and Rose
7. "An Art Exhibition in Paris" – George and Giulietta
8. "A Memory of a Happy Moment" – Giulietta and George
9. "In Many Rooms in the House at Pau" – Rose and Alex
10. "On the Terrace" – George, Alex and Rose
11. "Outside the Bedroom" – Rose and Alex
12. "Chanson d'Enfance" – Rose and Alex
13. "At the House at Pau" – Rose and Alex
14. "Everybody Loves a Hero" – Harkers and Ensemble
15. "George's Flat in Paris" – Elizabeth, Alex and Rose
16. First Orchestral Interlude – Alex, Elizabeth, Rose and George
17. "She'd Be Far Better Off with You" – George and Alex
18. Second Orchestral Interlude – Orchestra
19. "Stop. Wait. Please." – George, Giulietta and Rose
20. "A Registry Office" – Priest, Friends, George, Rose and Giulietta
21. "A Military Camp in Malaya" – Alex

Act II

1. Orchestral introduction to Act II – Orchestra
2. "A Theatre in Paris" – Marcel, Rose, Actress and Hugo
3. "Leading Lady" – Marcel, Rose, Alex and Hugo
4. "At the Stage Door" – Rose and Alex
5. "George's House at Pau" – Jenny and George
6. "Other Pleasures" – George, Jenny, Rose and Alex
7. "A Cafe in Venice" – Giulietta
8. "There is More to Love" – Giulietta
9. "The Garden at Pau" – George, Jenny, Rose and Alex
10. "Mermaid Song" – Jenny, Alex and George
11. "The Country Side Around the House (Third Orchestral Interlude) – Orchestra
12. "The Garden at Pau (Version 2)" – Jenny, Alex and Rose
13. "On the Terrace (Version 2)" – George, Hugo, Alex, Rose and Jenny
14. "The First Man You Remember" – George, Jenny and Alex
15. "The Vineyard At Pau" – George, Rose, Alex, Jenny, Hugo and Workmen
16. "Up in the Pyrenees" ("Chanson d'Enfance" (Reprise) / "Love Changes Everything" (Reprise)) – Jenny and Alex
17. "George's Study at Pau" – George and Rose
18. "Journey of a Lifetime" – Chanteuse, Ensemble, George, Rose, Alex and Jenny
19. "Falling" – Alex, Jenny, Rose and George
20. "Jenny's Bedroom in Paris" – Alex, Jenny, George, Rose and Hugo
21. "Hand Me the Wine and the Dice" – Giulietta, Chorus, Alex, Jenny, Rose, Hugo and Marcel
22. "A Hay Loft" – Giulietta and Alex
23. "On the Terrace (Version 3)" – Alex, Jenny and Rose
24. "Anything But Lonely" – Rose
25. "It Won't be Long till Jenny's a Woman" – Giulietta and Alex

Note: Although most of the musical is sung, not all the parts that are sung are titled songs; some are simply sung-through scenes with minor amounts of dialogue.

== Recording ==
The two-disc original cast recording of the London production preserved the bulk of the score with some edits made for reasons of length. A 2005 remastered edition restored all the material cut from the original release.

When the musical opened, the song "The First Man You Remember" was often performed on TV, the impression being that it was between a couple of romantic lovers. However, in the show itself it is actually a father and daughter duet between George and Jenny. It was sung by Michael Ball and Diana Morrison in the CD single version.

The first single released from the musical was "Love Changes Everything", also sung by Ball. It was a success, peaking at #2 and staying in the UK singles chart for 15 weeks, and has since become his signature song.

== Awards and nominations ==
Original Broadway production

Year	Award Ceremony	Category	Nominee	Result
1990	Drama Desk Award	Outstanding Musical		Nominated
1990	Drama Desk Award	Outstanding Featured Actress in a Musical	Danielle DuClos	Nominated
1990	Drama Desk Award	Outstanding Orchestrations	David Cullen and Andrew Lloyd Webber	Nominated
1990	Drama Desk Award	Outstanding Music	Andrew Lloyd Webber	Nominated
1990	Drama Desk Award	Outstanding Lighting Design	Andrew Bridge	Nominated
1990	Theatre World Award		Kathleen Rowe McAllen	Won
1990	Tony Award	Best Musical		Nominated
1990	Tony Award	Best Book of a Musical	Andrew Lloyd Webber	Nominated
1990	Tony Award	Best Original Score	Andrew Lloyd Webber, Don Black and Charles Hart	Nominated
1990	Tony Award	Best Performance by a Featured Actor in a Musical	Kevin Colson	Nominated
1990	Tony Award	Best Performance by a Featured Actress in a Musical	Kathleen Rowe McAllen	Nominated
1990	Tony Award	Best Direction of a Musical	Trevor Nunn	Nominated

== Notes ==
Preceded by Cuts Both Ways by Gloria Estefan	UK number one album September 16, 1989 – September 22, 1989	Succeeded by We Too Are One by Eurythmics
