= Claire Moore (singer) =

British actress and soprano singer

Claire Moore (2 January 1960 in Over Hulton, Bolton) is an English soprano singer and actress, best known for her leading role as Christine in Andrew Lloyd Webber's The Phantom of the Opera and as Ellen in Miss Saigon.

== Biography ==
=== Early life ===
The daughter of Peggy and Geoff Moore, the latter a jazz musician, she was educated at Hesketh Fletcher School, Atherton, and Leigh Sixth Form College, before training at the Royal Northern College of Music.

=== Career ===
Her early work includes appearing alongside Richard Harris in the 1982 London production of Camelot and playing the lead role of Audrey in the 1983–85 Comedy Theatre production of Little Shop of Horrors.

In 1986, she was cast as the alternate Christine Daaé in the original cast of The Phantom of the Opera. She played three shows each week instead of Sarah Brightman. When Brightman left the production after a year, Moore then took on the role full-time. She was voted "favourite Christine" by the Phantom Appreciation Society. In 1989 she left the role to play Ellen in the London production of Miss Saigon.

From 2000 to 2001, Moore played Mrs Anna (as alternate for Elaine Paige) in the London Palladium production of The King and I. She has also played Fantine and Madame Thenardier in Les Misérables; and also appeared in the musicals of Bernard J. Taylor.

Apart from musicals, her work also includes opera, and acting roles with the McKellen/Petherbridge Company's Royal National Theatre productions of The Duchess of Malfi, The Critic, The Real Inspector Hound and The Cherry Orchard.

She is featured on albums including the original cast recordings of Miss Saigon, The Phantom of the Opera – Highlights, Cabaret, Oliver! and Les Misérables, as well as The Music of Andrew Lloyd Webber, Leading Ladies and two solo albums of songs by Bernard J. Taylor.

Living and working in London, she returns regularly to perform at her home town at events such as Bolton Choral Union concerts.

She was seen in April and May 2008 as a vocal coach on BBC TV's I'd Do Anything, a role she previously undertook in How Do You Solve a Problem Like Maria? (2006) and Any Dream Will Do (2007). Claire reprised her role as vocal coach for Over the Rainbow in 2010. In 2011 she appeared in the Royal National Theatre production London Road at the Cottesloe Theatre.

Claire was the soloist in a James Bond special in the BBC Proms in September 2012. She was accompanied by the London Philharmonic Orchestra.

She was due to return to the London production of The Phantom of the Opera in September 2013, this time to play Carlotta Guidicelli, but her run was cancelled due to injury.

In 2017 she played the lead role of Chris in The Girls at the Phoenix Theatre

In the 2019 National Theatre production of Follies, she played former Follie girl Hattie Walker and sang one of the shows most popular songs, ‘Broadway Baby’. She followed this by playing the dual roles of ‘Miss Andrew/Miss Smythe' in the 2019 West End revival of Mary Poppins, the run of which was stopped on 16 March 2020 by the COVID-19 outbreak.

In 2022, Claire starred in the World Premier of The Great British Bake-Off: The Musical at the Everyman Theatre in Cheltenham, playing the role of a contestant called ‘Babs’. When that show transferred to the West End in February 2023, Claire continued in the same role alongside many of her co-stars from Cheltenham.

== Other sources ==
- Pirate who became a star of the Opera, This is Bolton, orig. Bolton Evening News, 7 November 1992
