= Sarah Brightman discography =

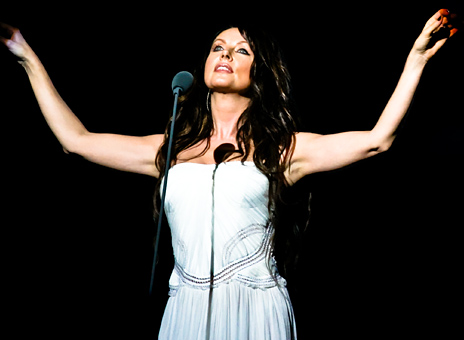
- Brightman performing in 2007
- Studio albums: 12
- Live albums: 3
- Compilation albums: 6
- Singles: 40
- Video albums: 8
- Collaboration: 8
- Limited: 3
- Cast recordings: 6
- Other appearances: 21

This page includes the full discography of British singer Sarah Brightman, including albums, singles, and theatre cast recordings.

== Albums ==
=== Studio albums ===
List of albums, with selected chart positions
Title	Album details	Peak chart positions												Certifications
Title	Album details	UK	CAN	AUS	AUT	FIN	SWE	NOR	GER	JPN	US	FR	BEL	Certifications
The Trees They Grow So High (Also known as Early One Morning)	Released: 28 December 1988; Label: EMI; Format: CD, CS, LP	—	—	—	—	—	—	—	—	—	—	—	—	
As I Came of Age	Released: 13 January 1990; Label: Polydor; Format: CD, CS, LP	—	—	—	—	—	—	—	—	—	—	—	—	
Dive	Released: 20 April 1993; Label: A&M; Format: CD, CS, LP	—	—	—	—	—	24	—	—	—	—	—	—	CAN: Gold
Fly	Released: 12 May 1995; Label: East West; Format: CD, CS	—	—	—	16	—	—	—	20	123	—	—	—	GER: Gold
Timeless (Also known as Time to Say Goodbye)	Released: 2 June 1997; Label: East West; Format: CD, CS	2	3	63	—	31	2	3	17	159	71	72	36	US: Platinum; CAN: 3× Platinum; UK: Gold; NZ: 3× Platinum; SWE: 2× Platinum; NOR: Platinum; GER: Gold
Eden	Released: 9 November 1998; Label: East West, Angel Records; Format: CD, CS	77	9	—	9	13	2	6	34	64	65	—	—	US: Gold; CAN: Platinum; SWE: Platinum; NOR: Platinum; DEN: Platinum
La Luna	Released: 25 April 2000; Label: East West, Angel Records; Format: CD, CS	37	5	94	9	7	3	8	17	16	17	—	38	US: Gold; CAN: Platinum; SWE: Gold; JPN: Gold
Harem	Released: 13 May 2003; Label: Angel Records; Format: CD, CS	172	8	16	22	25	1	36	12	8	29	—	—	CAN: Gold; GER: Gold; JPN: Gold
Symphony	Released: 28 January 2008; Label: Manhattan Records; Format: CD, DD	13	4	31	10	27	2	20	21	4	13	—	8	CAN: Gold; JPN: Gold
A Winter Symphony	Released: 4 November 2008; Label: Manhattan Records; Format: CD, DD	177	9	—	—	35	32	—	88	10	38	—	90	CAN: Gold; JPN: Gold
Dreamchaser	Released: 16 January 2013; Label: Simha LLC; Format: CD, DD	58	5	98	34	48	—	—	50	16	17	—	77	
Hymn	Released: 9 November 2018; Label: Decca Gold; Format: CD, DD, LP	—	29	—	—	—	—	—	61	23	50	—	118	
Winter In Paris (Released in France and Belgium only)	Released: 17 November 2023; Label: Metaphore, Safran, Nemo Studios, Hamburg; Format: CD, DD	—	—	—	—	—	—	—	—	—	—	—	124	
"—" denotes a title that did not chart, or was not released in that territory.

=== Albums with Andrew Lloyd Webber ===
List of albums, with selected chart positions
Title	Album details	Peak chart positions							Certifications
Title	Album details	UK	AUS	AUT	NLD	NOR	NZ	SWE	Certifications
Phantom of the Opera	Released: 1987; Label: Polydor; Format: CD, CS, LP	—	2	2	59	—	1	5	US: 4× Platinum; CAN: 8× Platinum; UK: 3× Platinum; SWI: 3× Platinum
Highlights from Phantom of the Opera	Released: 1988; Label: Polydor; Format: CD, CS, LP	—	—	3	—	—	4	—	US: 4× Platinum; CAN: 8× Platinum; SWI: 2× Platinum
The Songs That Got Away	Released: 1989; Label: Really Useful; Format: CD, CS, LP	48	—	—	—	—	—	—	
Sarah Brightman Sings the Music of Andrew Lloyd Webber	Released: 1992; Label: Polydor/Really Useful; Format: CD, CS, LP	—	55	—	—	—	—	—	
Surrender	Released: 1995; Label: Polydor/Really Useful; Format: CD, CS	—	77	—	—	—	42	—	
The Andrew Lloyd Webber Collection	Released: 1997; Label: Polydor/Really Useful/Raks Muzik; Format: CD, CS	—	—	—	—	20	—	1	US: Gold
Encore	Released: 2002; Label: Really Useful; Format: CD, CS	—	55	60	—	—	—	—	
Love Changes Everything: The Andrew Lloyd Webber Collection, Volume 2	Released: 2005; Label: Really Useful/Decca Broadway; Format: CD, CS	—	—	—	—	—	—	—	
"—" denotes a title that did not chart, or was not released in that territory.

=== Live albums ===
List of albums, with selected chart positions
Title	Album details	Peak chart positions						
Title	Album details	US	AUT	GER	JPN	MEX	NLD	POR
The Harem World Tour: Live from Las Vegas	Released: 27 September 2004; Label: Angel; Format: CD	126	49	99	82	95	42	19
Sarah Brightman: In Concert	Released: 13 July 2008; Label: Manhattan; Format: CD	—	—	—	239	58	—	—
Symphony: Live in Vienna	Released: 20 March 2008; Label: Manhattan; Format: CD	191	—	—	60	10	—	—
Hymn: in Concert	Released: 15 November 2019; Label: Universal Music; Format: CD	—	—	—	—	—	—	—
"—" denotes a title that did not chart, or was not released in that territory.

=== Limited release ===
List of albums, with sales figures and certifications
Title	Album details
Fly II (La Luna Tour Special Limited Edition)	Released: 25 April 2000; Label: Independent; Format: 2×CD
The Harem Tour (from Harem World Tour)	Released: 10 January 2004; Label: Independent; Format: CD
Symphony: Pre-Show Music (Orchestral) (from The Symphony World Tour)	Released: 4 November 2008; Label: Independent; Format: 2×CD

=== Compilation albums ===
List of albums, with selected chart positions
Title	Album details	Peak chart positions											Certifications
Title	Album details	UK	AUS	BEL	JPN	KOR	NLD	NOR	NZ	SWE	US	FR	Certifications
Classics (Not released in Europe)	Released: 20 November 2001; Label: Angel; Format: CD, CS	—	13	—	29	—	—	—	13	—	66	—	US: Gold; CAN: Platinum; AUS: Platinum; JPN: Platinum
The Very Best of 1990–2000 (Released in Europe only)	Released: 28 May 2001; Label: EastWest; Format: CD	—	—	—	—	—	8	—	—	9	—	—	SWE: Gold; NLD: Platinum
Classics: The Best of Sarah Brightman (Released in Europe only)	Released: 2 October 2006; Label: Angel; Format: CD	38	—	16	—	—	51	29	—	15	—	—	UK: Silver
Diva: The Singles Collection (Not Released in Europe)	Released: 3 October 2006; Label: Manhattan; Format: CD	—	—	—	2	1	—	—	10	—	100	—	NZ: Platinum; JPN: 2× Platinum
Amalfi – Sarah Brightman Love Songs (Released in Japan only)	Released: 8 July 2009; Label: EMI Music Japan; Format: CD, DD	—	—	—	11	—	—	—	—	—	—	—	JPN: Gold
Bella Voce (Released in United States only)	Released: 15 September 2009; Label: Green Hill; Format: CD	—	—	—	—	—	—	—	—	—	—	—	
Voce – Sarah Brightman Beautiful Songs (Released in Japan only)	Released: 19 March 2014; Label: Universal Music; Format: CD	—	—	—	13	—	—	—	—	—	—	—	
Rarities, Vol. 1 Rarities, Vol. 2 Rarities, Vol. 3 (Limited-time digital-only releases)	Released: 18 December 2015; Label: Nemo Records; Format: DD	—	—	—	—	—	—	—	—	—	—	—	
Gala – The Collection (Released in Japan only)	Released: 6 July 2016; Label: Universal Music; Format: CD	—	—	—	22	—	—	—	—	—	—	—	
France	Released: 20 November 2020; Label: Decca Gold; Format: CD, DD, LP	—	—	48	—	—	—	—	—	—	—	103	
"—" denotes a title that did not chart, or was not released in that territory.

=== Cast recordings ===
List of albums, with sales figures and certifications
Title	Album details
Cats	Released: 1981; Music by: Andrew Lloyd Webber; Lyrics by: T. S. Eliot, Trevor Nunn
Nightingale	Released: 1983; Music by: Charles Strouse; Lyrics by: Charles Strouse
Song and Dance	Released: 1984; Music by: Andrew Lloyd Webber; Lyrics by: Don Black
Requiem	Released: 1985; Music by: Andrew Lloyd Webber; Lyrics by: Andrew Lloyd Webber
Phantom of the Opera	Released: 1987; Music by: Andrew Lloyd Webber; Lyrics by: Charles Hart, Richard Stilgoe (add.)
Carousel	Released: 1987; Music by: Richard Rodgers; Lyrics by: Oscar Hammerstein II

== Video albums ==
List of albums, with sales figures and certifications
Title	Album details	Certifications
Sarah Brightman: In Concert	Released: 14 July 1998; Label: Sony Pictures; Running Time: 75 min.	BRA: Gold; ARG: Platinum
One Night in Eden	Released: 5 October 1999; Label: Angel; Running Time: 92 min.	US: Gold; ARG: Platinum
La Luna: Live in Concert	Released: 13 March 2001; Label: Angel; Running Time: 89 min.	US: Gold; MEX: Gold
Classics: The Best of Sarah Brightman VHS	Released: 1 April 2002 (Limited Release); Label: Angel; Running Time: 90 min.	
Harem: A Desert Fantasy	Released: 21 August 2004; Label: Angel; Running Time: 83 min.	ARG: Platinum
The Harem World Tour: Live from Las Vegas	Released: 28 September 2004; Label: Angel; Running Time: 110 min.	CAN: Platinum; ARG: 2× Platinum
Diva: The Video Collection	Released: 9 October 2006; Label: Angel; Running Time: 133 min	US: Gold; ARG: Platinum
Symphony: Live in Vienna	Released: 5 March 2009; Label: Angel; Running Time: 75 min.	MEX: Gold
Dreamchaser in Concert	Released: 16 December 2013; Label: Simha LLC; Running Time: 72 min.	
Hymn: in Concert	Released: 15 November 2019; Label: Eagle Rock Entertainment; Running Time: 97 min.	
A Christmas Symphony	Released: 26 November 2021; Label: Universal Music; Running Time: 120 min.	

== Singles ==
=== 1970s ===
Year	Title	Chart positions				Certifications	Album
Year	Title	UK	GER	IRE	NLD	Certifications	Album
1978	"I Lost My Heart to a Starship Trooper" (w/ Hot Gossip)	6	26	5	50	UK: Gold	Non-album single
1979	"The Adventures of the Love Crusader" (w/ The Starship Troopers)	53	—	—	—		Non-album single
1979	"Love in a U.F.O."	—	—	—	—		Non-album single
"—" denotes releases that did not chart or were not released in that country.

=== 1980s ===
Year	Title	Chart positions				Certifications	Album
Year	Title	UK	AUS	IRE	NZ	Certifications	Album
1981	"My Boyfriend's Back"	—	—	—	—		Non-album single
1981	"Not Having That!"	—	—	—	—		Non-album single
1983	"Him"	55	—	—	—		Non-album single
1983	"Rhythm of the Falling Rain"	—	—	—	—		Non-album single
1984	"Unexpected Song"	76	—	—	—		Non-album single
1985	"Pie Jesu" (w/ Paul Miles-Kingston)	3	—	3	50	UK: Platinum	Requiem
1986	"The Phantom of the Opera" (w/ Steve Harley)	7	—	11	—	UK: Silver	The Phantom of the Opera
1986	"All I Ask of You" (w/ Cliff Richard)	3	24	1	—		The Phantom of the Opera
1987	"The Music of the Night" / "Wishing You Were Somehow Here Again" (w/ Michael Crawford)	7	—	—	—		The Phantom of the Opera
1987	"Doretta's Dream"	—	—	—	—		Non-album single
"—" denotes releases that did not chart or were not released in that country.

=== 1990s ===
Year	Title	Chart positions												Certifications	Album
Year	Title	UK	AUS	AUT	BEL	CAN	FRA	GER	IRE	NLD	NOR	SWE	SWI	Certifications	Album
1990	"Anything But Lonely"	79	149	—	—	—	—	—	—	—	—	—	—		Non-album single
1990	"Something to Believe In"	—	—	—	—	—	—	—	—	—	—	—	—		As I Came of Age
1992	"Amigos Para Siempre" (w/ José Carreras)	11	1	—	—	—	—	—	16	—	10	36	—	AUS: Platinum	Non-album single
1993	"Captain Nemo"	—	—	—	—	62	—	—	—	—	—	—	—		Dive
1993	"The Second Element"	—	—	—	—	—	—	—	—	—	—	—	—		Dive
1995	"A Question of Honour"	—	—	—	—	—	—	15	—	—	—	—	—		Fly
1995	"How Can Heaven Love Me" (w/ Chris Thompson)	—	—	—	—	—	—	—	—	—	—	—	—		Fly
1995	"Heaven Is Here"	—	—	—	—	—	—	—	—	—	—	—	—		Fly
1996	"Time to Say Goodbye" (w/ Andrea Bocelli)	2	—	1	—	—	25	1	1	5	—	31	1	Austrian: Platinum; GER: 11× Gold; JPN: Gold; SWI: 2× Platinum; UK: Gold	Time to Say Goodbye
1997	"Just Show Me How to Love You" (w/ José Cura)	54	—	—	—	—	—	36	—	94	—	—	—		Time to Say Goodbye
1997	"Who Wants to Live Forever"	45	—	—	—	—	—	—	—	—	—	—	—		Time to Say Goodbye
1997	"Tú Quieres Volver"	—	—	—	—	—	—	—	—	—	—	—	—		Time to Say Goodbye
1998	"There for Me" (w/ José Cura)	—	—	—	5	—	—	—	—	—	—	—	—		Time to Say Goodbye
1998	"Starship Troopers" (w/ United Citizen Federation)	58	—	—	—	—	—	—	—	—	—	—	—		Starship Troopers OST
1998	"Eden"	68	—	—	—	—	—	—	—	—	—	—	—		Eden
1999	"Deliver Me"	—	—	—	—	—	—	—	—	—	—	—	—		Eden
1999	"So Many Things"	—	—	—	—	—	—	—	—	—	—	—	—		Eden
1999	"The Last Words You Said" (w/ Richard Marx)	—	—	—	—	—	—	—	—	—	—	—	—		Eden
"—" denotes releases that did not chart or were not released in that country.

=== 2000s ===
Year	Title	Chart positions	Certifications	Album
Year	Title	CAN	Certifications	Album
2001	"A Whiter Shade of Pale"	6	JPN: Gold	La Luna
2003	"Harem - Remixes"	—		Harem
2003	"What You Never Know"	—		Harem
2004	"Free"	—		Harem
2007	"I Will Be with You (Where the Lost Ones Go)" (w/ Chris Thompson)	—		Symphony
2007	"Running"	—		Symphony
2007	"Pasión" (w/ Fernando Lima)	—		Symphony
"—" denotes releases that did not chart or were not released in that country.

=== 2010s ===
Year	Title	Album
2010	"Done"	Non-album single
2012	"Angel"	Dreamchaser
2012	"One Day Like This"	Dreamchaser
2018	"Sogni" (w/ Vincent Niclo)	Hymn
2018	"Hymn"	Hymn
2018	"Miracle" (w/ Yoshiki)	Hymn
2019	"Fly to Paradise" (w/ Eric Whitacre Singers)	Hymn

=== 2020s ===
Year	Title	Album
2020	"Just Show Me How To Love You" (w/ Florent Pagny)	France
2023	"Le bonheur Est Multicolore" (w/ Louisa & Mathias)	Winter In Paris

== Guest appearances ==
List of guest appearances in other types of album with other performing artists, showing year released and album name.
Year	Title	Other performer(s)	Album
1979	"Madame Hyde"	—N/a	The World Is Full of Married Men: Original Motion Picture Soundtrack
1989	"Make Believe"	—N/a	Granpa: Original Motion Picture Soundtrack
1999	"Deliver Me"	—N/a	Brokedown Palace: Music from the Original Motion Picture Soundtrack
2000	"Don't Give Up"	Gregorian	Masters of Chant
2001	"Moment of Peace"	Gregorian	Masters of Chant Chapter II
2002	"Join Me"	Gregorian	Masters of Chant Chapter III
2002	"Join Me" (Schill Out-Version)	Gregorian	Masters of Chant Chapter III
2002	"Voyage, voyage"	Gregorian	Masters of Chant Chapter III
2002	"The Secret Still Remains or The Secret"	Sash!	S4!Sash!
2003	"The Smile"	Schiller	Leben
2006	"Heroes"	Gregorian	Masters of Chant Chapter V
2006	"Send Me an Angel"	Gregorian	Masters of Chant Chapter V
2006	"When a Child Is Born"	Gregorian	Christmas Chants
2007	"The Secret"	Sash!	10th Anniversary
2007	"Snowbird"	Anne Murray	Anne Murray Duets: Friends & Legends
2007	"All I Ask of You"	Josh Groban	Concert for Diana
2008	"Moment of Peace" (Christmas Version)	Gregorian	Christmas Chants & Visions
2008	"At the Opera Tonight"	Alexa Vega, Anthony Stewart Head, Paris Hilton, Terrance Zdunich, Bill Moseley, Ogre & Paul Sorvino	Repo! The Genetic Opera: Original Motion Picture Soundtrack
2008	"Crucifixus"	—N/a	Repo! The Genetic Opera: Original Motion Picture Soundtrack
2008	"Bravi!"	Ogre, Bill Moseley, Paul Sorvino & Paris Hilton	Repo! The Genetic Opera: Original Motion Picture Soundtrack
2008	"Chase the Morning"	Alexa Vega & Nancy Long	Repo! The Genetic Opera: Original Motion Picture Soundtrack
2008	"Everyone's a Composer"	Alexa Vega & Anthony Stewart Head	Repo! The Genetic Opera: Original Motion Picture Soundtrack
2008	"Chromaggia"	—N/a	Repo! The Genetic Opera: Original Motion Picture Soundtrack
2008	"Canto della Terra" & "Time to Say Goodbye"	Andrea Bocelli	Vivere Live in Tuscany
2009	"Stand Alone"	—N/a	Saka no Ue no Kumo
2011	"Alleluja"	—N/a	First Night: Original Motion Picture Soundtrack
2011	"The Phantom of the Opera"	Colm Wilkinson, Anthony Warlow, John Owen-Jones, Ramin Karimloo & Peter Jöback	The Phantom of the Opera at the Albert Hall in Celebration of 25 Years
2012	"The Secret" (Reloaded Version)	Sash!	Sash! Life Is a Beach
2015	"Life in the Streets"	Thomas Petersen	Life in the Streets
2024	"Love And Deepspace"	—N/a	Love And Deepspace Original Soundtrack
