= Diva: The Video Collection =

2006 video music compilation

Video by Sarah Brightman
- Released: October 2006
- Recorded: 1978–2006
- Genre: Pop, Classical Crossover
- Length: 133:00
- Label: Angel Records

Sarah Brightman chronology
The Harem World Tour: Live from Las Vegas (2004)	Diva: The Video Collection (2006)	Symphony: Live in Vienna (2008)

Diva: The Video Collection is a video longform. When Sarah Brightman introduces each song, she talks about where, when and how the music video was made. Several music videos are not featured, most notable songs are Rhythm of the Rain, Deliver Me and All I Ask of You.

== Track listing ==
No.	Title	Director(s)	Length
1.	"Pie Jesu"	Stephen Frears
2.	"Phantom of the Opera"	Ken Russell
3.	"Wishing You Were Somehow Here Again"	Ken Russell
4.	"Amigos Para Siempre"	Hugh Hudson
5.	"Captain Nemo"	Howard Greenhalgh
6.	"A Question of Honour"	Joachim Kirschstein
7.	"How Can Heaven Love Me"	David Mallet
8.	"Time to Say Goodbye"	Joachim Kirschstein
9.	"Just Show Me How to Love You"	Rudi Dolezal & Hannes Rossacher
10.	"Eden"	Michael Geoghagan
11.	"Who Wants to Live Forever"	Alexander Hemming
12.	"Deliver Me"	Rudi Dolezal & Hannes Rossacher
13.	"Anytime Anywhere"	Rudi Dolezal & Hannes Rossacher
14.	"Nella Fantasia"	Simon Fowler
15.	"Whiter Shade of Pale"	Paul Boyd
16.	"Ave Maria"	Simon Fowler
17.	"Kama Sutra"	Rudi Dolezal & Hannes Rossacher
18.	"Harem (Cancao Do Mar)"	Rudi Dolezal & Hannes Rossacher
19.	"Free"	Rudi Dolezal & Hannes Rossacher
20.	"Starship Troopers"	Paul Verhoeven
21.	"The Music of the Night (Andrew Lloyd Webber's 50th birthday celebration)"	David Mallet

== Certifications ==
Region	Certification	Certified units/sales
Argentina (CAPIF)	Platinum	8,000^{^}
United States (RIAA)	Gold	50,000^{^}
^{^} Shipments figures based on certification alone.
