= Sarah Brightman in Concert =

2009 concert tour

- Tour by Sarah Brightman
- Promotional poster for concert in Ciudad Juárez
- Start date: 2 October 2009
- End date: 31 October 2009
- No. of shows: 14

Sarah Brightman concert chronology
- The Symphony World Tour (2008-09); Sarah Brightman in Concert (2009); Sarah Brightman in Concert with Orchestra (2010)

Sarah Brightman in Concert was a 2009 concert tour by the English classical crossover singer Sarah Brightman throughout Latin America.

After The Symphony World Tour, Brightman started another world tour in October 2009, visiting first Mexico closing Festival Internacional de Chihuahua (Chihuahua International Festival) in Benito Juarez Olympic Stadium. Then continued through Latin America with totally sold-out venues in 7 countries, and ending in UNESCO World Heritage Site Chichen Itza, Mexico, where she was accompanied by the Symphony Orchestra of Yucatán under the direction of Paul Bateman, with tenor Erkan Aki and countertenor Fernando Lima.

== Set list ==
Act I

Intro: Sanvean Instrumental

- Gothica / Fleurs Du Mal
- Symphony
- It's a Beautiful Day (Contains elements from "Un Bel Di Vedremo")

Interlude: Forbidden Colours Instrumental

- What a Wonderful World
- Dust in the Wind
- Who Wants to Live Forever
- Hijo de la Luna
- La Luna

Interlude: Sarahbande Instrumental

- Anytime, Anywhere
- Nella Fantasia
- Canto della Terra (with Erkan Aki)
- Sarai Qui (with Erkan Aki)
- Nessun dorma

Act II

- Harem
- Stranger in Paradise

Interlude: Billitis Générique Instrumental

- Scarborough Fair
- He Doesn't See Me
- A Whiter Shade of Pale
- Pasión (with Fernando Lima)
- Ave Maria (with Fernando Lima)
- Wishing You Were Somehow Here Again
- The Phantom of the Opera (with Erkan Aki)
- Time to Say Goodbye

Encore

- Deliver Me
- A Question of Honour

== Tour dates ==
List of 2009 concerts
Date	City	Country	Venue	Attendance	Revenue
2 October 2009	Ciudad Juárez	Mexico	Estadio Olímpico Benito Juárez	—N/a	—N/a
5 October 2009	Mexico City	Mexico	Auditorio Nacional	9,565 / 9,683	$631,222
7 October 2009	Puebla City	Mexico	Auditorio Siglo XXI	—N/a	—N/a
9 October 2009	Zapopan	Mexico	Telmex Auditorium	—N/a	—N/a
11 October 2009	Monterrey	Mexico	Arena Monterrey	—N/a	$598,102
14 October 2009	Caracas	Venezuela	Teresa Carreño Theater	—N/a	—N/a
16 October 2009	Santiago	Chile	Movistar Arena	5,899 / 8,679	$474,506
17 October 2009	Buenos Aires	Argentina	Estadio Luna Park	—N/a	$393,786
20 October 2009	São Paulo	Brazil	Credicard Hall	7,184 / 8,212	$1,063,193
21 October 2009	São Paulo	Brazil	Credicard Hall	7,184 / 8,212	$1,063,193
23 October 2009	Rio de Janeiro	Brazil	Citibank Hall	2,106 / 3,092	$311,934
26 October 2009	Lima	Peru	Jockey Club Parcela H	—N/a	—N/a
28 October 2009	Bogotá	Colombia	Coliseo Cubierto el Campín	—N/a	$278,145
31 October 2009	Chichen Itza	Mexico	El Castillo	—N/a	—N/a
