= Sarah Brightman Sings the Music of Andrew Lloyd Webber =

Studio album by Sarah Brightman
- Released: 1992
- Recorded: 1992
- Genre: Vocals, musicals, show tunes
- Label: Polydor/Really Useful Records

Sarah Brightman chronology
As I Came of Age (1990)	Sarah Brightman Sings the Music of Andrew Lloyd Webber (1992)	Dive (1993)

Sarah Brightman Sings the Music of Andrew Lloyd Webber is a 1992 full-length album released in conjunction with Sarah Brightman's world tour The Music of Andrew Lloyd Webber. The album contains most of the songs performed regularly on that tour and features all-new recordings, with the exception of "Pie Jesu", "All I Ask of You", "The Phantom of the Opera", "Anything but Lonely", and "Amigos Para Siempre (Friends for Life)". The album was re-released in Japan with a different cover and peaked #242 in the Oricon charts.

== Track listing ==
No.	Title	Writer(s)	Length
1.	"Don't Cry for Me Argentina"	Andrew Lloyd Webber, Tim Rice	5:57
2.	"Another Suitcase in Another Hall"	Lloyd Webber, Rice	3:22
3.	"Everything's Alright"	Lloyd Webber, Rice	4:34
4.	"I Don't Know How to Love Him"	Lloyd Webber, Rice	3:54
5.	"Memory"	Lloyd Webber, Trevor Nunn, T. S. Eliot	4:08
6.	"Any Dream Will Do"	Lloyd Webber, Rice	3:51
7.	"Anything But Lonely"	Lloyd Webber, Don Black, Charles Hart	2:58
8.	"Pie Jesu" (feat. Paul Miles-Kingston)	Lloyd Webber	3:57
9.	"Love Changes Everything"	Lloyd Webber, Black, Hart	3:51
10.	"Tell Me on a Sunday"	Lloyd Webber, Black	3:58
11.	"The Phantom of the Opera" (feat. Steve Harley)	Lloyd Webber, Richard Stilgoe	4:42
12.	"All I Ask of You" (feat. Cliff Richard)	Lloyd Webber, Hart, Stilgoe	4:11
13.	"Wishing You Were Somehow Here Again"	Lloyd Webber, Hart, Stilgoe	3:49
14.	"The Music of the Night"	Lloyd Webber, Hart, Stilgoe	5:24
15.	"Amigos Para Siempre" (feat. José Carreras)	Lloyd Webber, Black	4:37
Total length:			63:13

== Chart performance ==
Chart (1992–2006)	Peak position
Australian Albums (ARIA Charts)	65
Japanese Albums (Oricon)	242
