= Bella Voce =

Bella Voce may refer to:

- Bella Voce (group), a Chicago-based chamber chorus
- Bella Voce (album), a 2009 compilation album by Sarah Brightman
