= The Andrew Lloyd Webber Collection =

1997 compilation album by Sarah Brightman

Compilation album by Sarah Brightman
- Released: 1997
- Genre: Vocal, musicals, show tunes
- Label: Polydor/Really Useful Records/Raks Muzik

Sarah Brightman chronology
Timeless (1997)	The Andrew Lloyd Webber Collection (1997)	Eden (1998)

The Andrew Lloyd Webber Collection is a 1997 compilation album by British classical crossover soprano Sarah Brightman. All of the tracks on this album are previously available on other albums. It is Brightman's third best-selling release in the United States.

== Track listing ==
No.	Title	Music	Length
1.	"The Phantom of the Opera" (feat. Michael Crawford)	from The Phantom of the Opera	4:21
2.	"Unexpected Song"	from Song and Dance	2:56
3.	"Chanson d'Enfance"	from Aspects of Love	3:56
4.	"All I Ask of You" (feat. Cliff Richard)	from The Phantom of the Opera	4:10
5.	"Don't Cry for Me Argentina"	from Evita	5:54
6.	"Another Suitcase in Another Hall"	from Evita	3:21
7.	"Love Changes Everything"	from Aspects of Love	3:35
8.	"Amigos Para Siempre" (feat. José Carreras)	written for the 1992 Summer Olympics in Barcelona	4:36
9.	"Memory"	from Cats	3:58
10.	"Gus: The Theatre Cat" (feat. Sir John Gielgud)	from Cats	5:11
11.	"Anything but Lonely"	from Aspects of Love	2:57
12.	"Macavity: The Mystery Cat"	from Cats	4:44
13.	"Tell Me on a Sunday"	from Tell Me on a Sunday/Song and Dance	3:45
14.	"Wishing You Were Somehow Here Again"	from The Phantom of the Opera	3:32
15.	"Pie Jesu" (feat. Paul Miles-Kingston)	from Requiem	3:56
16.	"The Music of the Night"	from The Phantom of the Opera	5:22
Total length:			66:15

== Chart performance ==
The album debuted at the Billboard Top 200 Albums at No. 110 and remained 17 weeks on chart. It peaked at the Billboard Top Classical Crossover Albums at No. 2.

In April 2008, after Andrew Lloyd Webber appeared at the seventh season of the American show American Idol, and supplemented by a featured appearance of the record at the iTunes music store, the album peaked to No. 1 at the store's Top 100 Vocal albums.

Chart (1997)	Peak Position
Norwegian Album Chart	20
Swedish Album Chart	1
U.S. Billboard Top 200 Albums	110
U.S. Billboard Top Classical Crossover Albums	2

== Certifications ==
Region	Certification	Certified units/sales
United States (RIAA)	Gold	787,000
