= Surrender (Sarah Brightman and Andrew Lloyd Webber album) =

1995 soundtrack

Soundtrack album by Sarah Brightman & Andrew Lloyd Webber
- Released: 1995
- Genre: Musicals, Show Tunes
- Length: 68:39

Sarah Brightman & Andrew Lloyd Webber chronology
Sarah Brightman Sings the Music of Andrew Lloyd Webber (1992)	Surrender (1995)	The Andrew Lloyd Webber Collection (1997)

Surrender is an album by English soprano Sarah Brightman featuring songs composed by Andrew Lloyd Webber. The album’s booklet also includes Lloyd Webber's commentary for each song.

== Track listing ==
No.	Title	Music	Length
1.	"Surrender"	from Sunset Boulevard	3:06
2.	"Unexpected Song"	from Song and Dance	2:56
3.	"Chanson d'Enfance"	from Aspects of Love	3:55
4.	"Tell Me on a Sunday"	from Tell Me on a Sunday/Song and Dance	3:45
5.	"Nothing Like You've Ever Known"	from Tell Me on a Sunday/Song and Dance	3:09
6.	"Macavity: The Mystery Cat"	from Cats	4:44
7.	"Gus: The Theatre Cat" (feat. Sir John Gielgud)	from Cats	5:11
8.	"Piano" (“Memory”, Italian version)	from Cats	5:05
9.	"Everything's Alright"	from Jesus Christ Superstar	4:31
10.	"The Last Man in My Life"	from Tell Me on a Sunday/Song and Dance	3:09
11.	"Pie Jesu" (feat. Paul Miles-Kingston)	from Requiem	3:56
12.	"Amigos Para Siempre" (feat. José Carreras)	written for the 1992 Summer Olympics in Barcelona	4:35
13.	"No Llores Por Mi, Argentina" (“Don't Cry for Me Argentina”, Spanish version)	from Evita	5:32
14.	"Guardami" (“With One Look”, Italian version)	from Sunset Boulevard	3:38
15.	"There Is More to Love"	from Aspects of Love	2:32
16.	"Wishing You Were Somehow Here Again"	from The Phantom of the Opera	3:30
17.	"The Music of the Night"	from The Phantom of the Opera	5:26
Total length:			68:39

International Edition
No.	Title	Music	Length
18.	"The Phantom of the Opera" (feat. Michael Crawford)	from The Phantom of the Opera	4:21
Total length:			73:00

== Charts ==
Chart performance for Surrender
Chart (1995)	Peak position
Australian Albums (ARIA)	77
New Zealand Albums (RMNZ)	42
UK Albums (OCC)	45
