= Dreamchaser =

Studio album by Sarah Brightman
- Released: 16 January 2013 (Japan)
- Recorded: 2012
- Studios: Abbey Road Studios (London, England); Air Studios (London, England); Air-Edel Studios (London, England); Angel Recording Studios (London, UK); Stratosphere Sound (New York, NY); The Strongroom (London, England); The Village Recorder (Los Angeles, CA); Westlake Recording Studios (Los Angeles, CA)
- Genre: Classical crossover
- Length: 60:42
- Label: Simha LLC
- Producers: Mike Hedges, Sally Herbert

Sarah Brightman chronology
Bella Voce (2009)	Dreamchaser (2013)	Gala – The Collection (2016)

Singles from Dreamchaser
- 1. "Angel" Released: 15 October 2012; 2. "One Day Like This" Released: 19 November 2012; 3. "Glosoli (Eyes Remix)" Released: 1 October 2013

Dreamchaser is the eleventh studio album by English singer Sarah Brightman. This album is Brightman's first collaboration with producer Mike Hedges and centres on the concept of space. The offering was inspired by Brightman's decision to become the first singer in outer space, as she intended to launch on an orbital spaceflight mission to the International Space Station (ISS) in partnership with Space Adventures, Ltd., a private space experiences company. however, in March 2015 it was announced that Brightman had postponed the flight for personal reasons. The album was released in Japan on 16 January 2013, in the United Kingdom on 8 April 2013, and in North America on 16 April 2013 to critical acclaim.

The Dreamchaser World Tour was Brightman's eighth concert tour and served as a major promotion of the album. The tour lasted for a period of two years and became her second largest world tour, performing in over twenty countries. In November 2013, PBS aired the live-concert Dreamchaser in Concert, filmed in Elstree Studios, and later released in Japan on 18 December of the same year as DVD and Blu-ray format.

Dreamchaser entered at the Top 20 of seven countries and the Top 60 of another five. The album peaked at number 17 in the United States, being Brightman's third top-twenty album in the country.

== Background ==
Inspired by her planned trip to the International Space Station, Brightman planned to make an album that would "convey the ideas and visions you would get from being a human up in space". The album has been described as grand, ethereal, and somewhat experimental.

The majority of Dreamchaser's songs are covers, with "B 612" being the only entirely original composition on the standard edition of the album. "B 612"'s title is a reference to the asteroid of the same name from Antoine de Saint-Exupéry's novella The Little Prince. Two bonus tracks that are exclusive to the Super Deluxe Edition of the album, "7th Heaven" and "In The Air", are also original compositions. All three were written by Sarah Brightman, Makoto Sakamoto, and Yuka Ikushima. The background of the remaining songs are as follows:

- "Angel" was originally recorded by Jerry Burns and Sally Herbert for the soundtrack of the 2001 film Crush.
- "One Day Like This" was originally recorded by Elbow for their 2008 album The Seldom Seen Kid.
- "Glosoli" was originally recorded by Sigur Rós for their 2005 album Takk.... While the song was originally sung in Icelandic, Brightman's version features entirely new English lyrics written by Chris Difford of the band Squeeze.
- "Lento e Largo" is an extract from Henryk Górecki's Symphony No. 3.
- "Breathe Me" was originally recorded by Sia for her 2004 album Colour the Small One.
- "Ave Maria" is an interpretation of "Ave Maria, o auctrix vite" by the 12th-century composer Hildegard of Bingen with new original Latin lyrics credited to Brightman, Sally Herbet, and Mike Hedges. Brightman had previously released another track called "Ave Maria" on her 2001 album Classics, though that was a recording of an entirely different composition by Franz Schubert.
- "Eperdu" was originally recorded by Cocteau Twins for their 1996 album Milk & Kisses.
- "A Song of India" in an interpretation of the aria "Song of the Indian Guest" from Nikolai Rimsky-Korsakov's opera Sadko.
- "Venus and Mars" was originally recorded by Paul McCartney and Wings on their 1975 album of the same name. Brightman's version combines lyrics from both "Venus and Mars" and "Venus and Mars (Reprise)" which appear as separate tracks on the original Wings album.
- "Closer" is an arrangement of themes from Mike Oldfield's Tubular Bells, primarily interpolating elements from "Tubular Bells, Part One". It features original lyrics written by Chris Braide.
- "Kaze No Toorimichi" was originally recorded by Joe Hisaishi, featuring the Suginami Children's Choir for the soundtrack to the 1988 film My Neighbor Totoro.
- "Hawaii '78" was originally recorded by Israel Kamakawiwoʻole on his album Facing Future. Brightman's version features a posthumous duet with Kamakawiwoʻole, who died in 1997.
- "So Long Ago So Clear" was originally recorded by Vangelis featuring Jon Anderson for the 1975 album Heaven and Hell.

== Singles ==
The first single "Angel" was released on Brightman's official website on 26 September 2012 and it was later released for purchase on 15 October 2012 in Europe and Mexico. The second single, a cover of Elbow band's song "One Day Like This", was released on 19 November 2012. In October 2013 "Glosoli" was released as a promotional single in the form of a dance remix by Samuel Cramer under the alias Eyes. The remixed single was given a digital release on the SoundCloud and Last.fm streaming platforms and received a limited Promo Only release on CD.

== Promotion ==
To promote Dreamchaser Sarah Brightman appeared in several TV shows, starting in January 2013. She performed "One Day Like This" live on Japan's news program News Zero. She also made several appearances and interviews in TV shows such as El Mañanero, Loose Women, The One Show, CJAD 800 Radio, Breakfast BBC1, FOROtv Mexico and Last.fm. She sang "One Day Like This" on the Hallmark Channel's The Home and Family Show. She performed the same song "Time to Say Goodbye" with Andrea Bocelli in the German television program Willkommen bei Carmen Nebel. Later, Brightman went to China and Japan in February, Germany in March, the United States in April and to Mexico at the beginning of May where she signed autographs and held press conferences.

== Critical reception ==
Professional ratings
Review scores
Source	Rating
AllMusic	3.5/5 stars
Daily Express	4/5 stars
The Gazette	4/5 stars
Polari Magazine	5/5 stars
A.V. Wire	5/5 stars

Dreamchaser has received acclaim from critics, many considering it Brightman's strongest work to date. Many pointed out the coherence of the song choices and the quality of Brightman's vocals. Bernard Perusse of the Montreal Gazette described the album as "expertly-executed" and added "Brightman confirms what we have always suspected: less is not necessarily more." AllMusic commented that Brightman "gets points for even attempting some of these songs. That she pulls off her most daring choices is a testament to her artistry."

Stephen Unwin of the Daily Express wrote that the album is "an almost surreal, often heartbreaking record that is stirringly epic." Polari Magazine in a 5-star review described the album as "stunning" and continued that "instead of playing it safe and releasing yet another Mother's Day Opera-By-Numbers album like most classical singers, Sarah's general lunacy helps her to take risks most artists in her genre wouldn't take."

== Commercial reception ==
Dreamchaser became Brightman's seventh No. 1 album in the Billboard Classical Crossover chart. It also reached the third spot on the Top Independent Albums chart, marking Brightman's first appearance on this list. Dreamchaser peaked at number five on the Canadian Albums Chart, the second place on the Australian Classical Albums Chart and number 17 on the Billboard 200, moving 20,358 copies on its first week. In Japan, the album debuted in the top 20. It entered the chart at No. 16, selling 7,183 copies during its first week.

== World Tour ==
Sarah Brightman began a world tour, the eighth of her career, to promote her Dreamchaser album. The tour was created and promoted under the name of the Dreamchaser World Tour. The tour started on 16 June 2013 and ended on 14 14 December 2014. The tour included stops in twenty-four countries of four different continents, Asia, Europe, North and South America. The World Tour consisted of 106 shows in total over a year and a half time span, being her largest tour since the Harem World Tour.

== Track listing ==
All the songs were produced and arranged by Sally Herbert and Mike Hedges. It was recorded mostly at Abbey Road Studios (London) and Westlake Studios (Los Angeles). Mazen Murad mastered the album at Metropolis Studios, London.

No.	Title	Writer(s)	Length
1.	"Angel"	Jerry Burns, Sally Herbert	5:33
2.	"One Day Like This"	Guy Garvey, Mark Potter, Craig Potter, Richard Jupp, Pete Turner	6:06
3.	"Glósóli"	Jón Þór Birgisson, Georg Hólm, Kjartan Sveinsson, Orri Páll Dýrason, Chris Difford	6:50
4.	"Lento E Largo from Symphony N° 3, OP. 36 (Symphony of Sorrowful Songs)"	Henryk Gorecki	5:39
5.	"B612"	Sarah Brightman, Makoto Sakamoto, Yuka Ikushima	4:50
6.	"Breathe Me"	Sia Furler, Dan Carey	4:48
7.	"Ave Maria"	Hildegard von Bingen	5:48
8.	"Éperdu"	Elizabeth Fraser, Simon Raymonde, Robin Guthrie	5:07
9.	"A Song of India"	Nikolai Rimsky-Korsakov	3:26
10.	"Venus and Mars"	Linda McCartney, Paul McCartney	4:26
11.	"Closer" (not included on the Japanese standard edition)	Mike Oldfield, Chris Braide	8:09

Japanese edition and iTunes bonus track
No.	Title	Writer(s)	Length
11.	"Kaze No Toorimichi" (風の通り道, "Path of the Wind")	Joe Hisaishi, Hayao Miyazaki	4:14

Japanese limited deluxe edition with DVD
No.	Title	Writer(s)	Length
11.	"Closer"	Oldfield, Braide	8:09
12.	"Kaze No Toorimichi" (風の通り道, "Path of the Wind")	Hisaishi, Miyazaki	4:14

Target exclusive edition bonus tracks
No.	Title	Writer(s)	Length
12.	"In the Air"	Brightman, Sakamoto, Ikushima	4:37
13.	"Hawaii '78"	Mickey Loane	4:41

Limited deluxe edition bonus DVD
No.	Title	Writer(s)	Length
1.	"Sarah's Dreamchaser Monologue"		1:12
2.	"Angel" (music video)		4:34
3.	"Star City, Russia Space Sizzle Reel"		3:49
4.	"Photo Gallery"		3:16
5.	"So Long Ago So Clear" (bonus audio track)	Vangelis, Jon Anderson	5:30
6.	"7th Heaven" (bonus audio track)	Brightman, Sakamoto, Ikushima	4:27

Super deluxe edition bonus tracks
No.	Title	Writer(s)	Length
12.	"In the Air"	Brightman, Sakamoto, Ikushima	4:37
13.	"Hawaii '78"	Loane	4:41
14.	"7th Heaven"	Brightman, Sakamoto, Ikushima	4:23
15.	"So Long Ago So Clear"	Vangelis, Anderson	5:25

iTunes deluxe edition bonus tracks
No.	Title	Writer(s)	Length
12.	"7th Heaven"	Brightman, Sakamoto, Ikushima	4:23
13.	"So Long Ago So Clear"	Vangelis, Anderson	5:25
14.	"Angel" (music video)		4:22

== Charts ==
Chart (2013)	Peak position
Australian Albums (ARIA Charts)	98
Australian Classical Albums (ARIA Charts)	2
Austrian Albums (Ö3 Austria Top 40)	34
Belgian Albums (Ultratop Flanders)	77
Belgian Albums (Ultratop Wallonia)	168
Canadian Albums (Billboard)	5
Czech Albums (IFPI)	23
Dutch Albums (MegaCharts)	50
Finnish Albums (Suomen virallinen lista)	48
German Albums (Offizielle Top 100)	50
Greek Albums (IFPI)	11
Japanese Albums (Oricon)	16
Mexican Albums (Top 100 Mexico)	12
South Korean Albums (Gaon Album Chart)	11
Swiss Albums (Schweizer Hitparade)	81
UK Albums (OCC)	58
US Billboard 200	17
US Top Classical Crossover Albums (Billboard)	1
US Top Independent Albums (Billboard)	3

== Release history ==
Region	Date	Label
Japan	16 January 2013	EMI Music Japan
Australia	5 April 2013	Koch Records
Germany	5 April 2013	Koch Records
United Kingdom	8 April 2013	Decca Records
Canada	16 April 2013	Warner Music
United States	16 April 2013	Simha LLC
South Korea	23 April 2013	Universal Music
Taiwan	14 June 2013	Gold Typhoon
