= Sarah Brightman in Concert with Orchestra =

2010 concert tour

- Tour by Sarah Brightman
- Location: Asia; Europe; North America
- Start date: 2 October 2010
- End date: 19 November 2010
- No. of shows: 12

Sarah Brightman concert chronology
- Sarah Brightman in Concert (2009); Sarah Brightman in Concert with Orchestra (2010); Dreamchaser World Tour (2013-2014)

Sarah Brightman in Concert with Orchestra was a concert tour by English soprano singer Sarah Brightman. The tour featured shows in Canada, Japan, Macau, South Korea, and Ukraine. These performances were from a more traditional classical standpoint. Brightman sang alongside the Prime Philharmonic Orchestra, New Japan Philharmonic, Aichi Chamber Orchestra, Kyoto Philharmonic Chamber orchestra, Orchestra Ensemble Kanazawa, Hong Kong Concert Orchestra and Prime Philharmonic Orchestra in Seoul.

== Set list ==
Act I

- "Overture: Tallis Fantasia"
- "Bailero"
- "La Wally"
- "Serenade"
- "How Fair This Place"
- "Nessun dorma"
- "Interlude: Capriccio Espagnol"
- "It's a Beautiful Day"
- "Stranger in Paradise"
- "Hijo de la Luna"
- "La Luna"

20 minute intermission

Act II

- "Overture: Japanese Garden"
- "What a Wonderful World"
- "Scarborough Fair"
- "He Doesn't See Me"
- "Interlude: Sarahbande"
- "Anytime, Anywhere"
- "Nella Fantasia"
- "Canto della Terra"
- "Wishing You Were Somehow Here Again"
- "Interlude: Phantom of the Opera Overture"
- "The Phantom of the Opera"
- "Time to Say Goodbye"

Encore

- "Running"
- "Ave Maria"
- "Done" (performed in Japan only)

== Tour dates ==
List of 2010 concerts
Date	City	Country	Venue
2 October 2010	Oshawa	Canada	General Motors Centre
9 October 2010	Nara	Japan	Todaiji
12 October 2010	Tokyo	Japan	Tokyo International Forum
14 October 2010	Nagoya	Japan	Nippon Gaishi Hall
15 October 2010	Kanazawa	Japan	Ishikawa Sports Center
17 October 2010	Tokyo	Japan	Tokyo International Forum
18 October 2010	Tokyo	Japan	Tokyo International Forum
20 October 2010	Osaka	Japan	Osaka-Jo Hall
21 October 2010	Tokyo	Japan	Tokyo International Forum
22 October 2010	Tokyo	Japan	Tokyo International Forum
24 October 2010	Cotai	Macau	Macau East Asian Games Dome
26 October 2010	Seoul	South Korea	Jamsil Arena
19 November 2010	Donetsk	Ukraine	Druzhba Arena
