= Brokedown Palace (disambiguation) =

Brokedown Palace is a 1999 American drama film by Jonathan Kaplan.

Brokedown Palace may also refer to:

- Brokedown Palace (novel), a novel by Steven Brust
- Brokedown Palace: Music from the Original Motion Picture Soundtrack
- "Brokedown Palace (song)", a 1970 Grateful Dead song
