= Dreamchaser in Concert =

Dreamchaser In Concert

Video by Sarah Brightman
- Released: 16 December 2013 (Taiwan); 18 December 2013 (Japan)
- Producer: Sarah Brightman

Sarah Brightman chronology
| Symphony: Live in Vienna (2008) | Dreamchaser In Concert (2013) | Hymn: in Concert (2019) |

Sarah Brightman: Dreamchaser in Concert is a live concert recording by Sarah Brightman following her 2012 release, Dreamchaser. It was recorded in June 2013 at the Elstree Studios near London, United Kingdom.

Dreamchaser In Concert has been released as a DVD for all the PBS Pledgers (United States) and it is available in different packages and Prices.

It has been released as a DVD and a Blu-ray disc only in Taiwan and Japan.

== Track listing ==
1. Angel
2. One Day Like This
3. Éperdu
4. Ave Maria
5. Closer
6. Glósóli
7. Kaze No Torimichi
8. Nessun Dorma
9. A Song of India
10. Venus and Mars
11. Phantom of the Opera
12. Deliver Me
13. Scarborough Fair
14. Time to Say Goodbye
