= Kristian Draude =

German musician

Kristian Draude (born 1 February 1977) is a German musician who has worked with artists including Elton John, Sarah Brightman, and Gregorian. The music he has written and produced has sold over 5 million albums. In addition, he has also composed music for television shows, short films, commercials, web performances and multi-media applications.

== Biography ==
Draude started playing drums at the age of ten. Four years later he recorded the first album with his band Lazy Strike under Steffi Stefan, producer of German rock legends like Udo Lindenberg and Peter Maffay.

After getting live experience with different bands and musicals he moved to Hamburg, where he formed the band JAW. In the year 2000 the album No blue peril was released. The band played over 100 concerts all over Europe and was nominated for various German awards.

In addition, Draude worked as an engineer, programmer and songwriter for producer Peter Hoffmann, who produced artists including Falco, Oli.P, and German shooting stars Tokio Hotel.

In 2001 Draude concentrated on studio work, produced and wrote for acts like the international selling dance-act ATC, Spanish pop star Princessa, the German Star Search winners and many other bands. At this time, he built his own recording studio, Most Fresh Studio.

In 2002 he started working with producer Frank Peterson, who had worked with artists including Enigma and Sarah Brightman. He wrote and produced music for several Sarah Brightman records including Harem and Live from Las Vegas. In 2004 the song "The War Is Over" from Harem won an Arabian music award. Currently, Draude works as a studio drummer and plays live concerts, radio and television shows for artists including Elton John, Sugababes, Chris de Burgh, Ronan Keating, Gregorian, Jasmin Wagner and Palomino.
