= Encore (Sarah Brightman album) =

Studio album by Sarah Brightman
- Released: 2002
- Genre: Classical Crossover; Show tune
- Length: 51:21
- Label: Really Useful Group Ltd

Sarah Brightman chronology
| Classics (2001) | Encore (2002) | Harem (2003) |

Encore is an album by English soprano Sarah Brightman, released in 2002. It includes tracks from two previous Brigtman and Andrew Lloyd Webber albums (The Songs That Got Away and Surrender), and four previously unreleased tracks. This is similar to Classics which only featured four new songs.

== Track listing ==
| No. | Title | Length |
|---|---|---|
| 1. | "Whistle Down the Wind" | 3:28 |
| 2. | "Away from You" | 3:29 |
| 3. | "Guardami" ("With One Look", Italian version) | 3:38 |
| 4. | "Think of Me" (with Steve Barton) | 3:16 |
| 5. | "One More Walk Around the Garden" | 3:19 |
| 6. | "Surrender" | 3:06 |
| 7. | "If I Ever Fall in Love Again" | 4:00 |
| 8. | "Half a Moment" | 3:59 |
| 9. | "Piano" ("Memory", Italian version) | 5:08 |
| 10. | "What More Do I Need" | 3:05 |
| 11. | "There is More to Love" | 2:35 |
| 12. | "The Last Man in My Life" | 3:10 |
| 13. | "In the Mandarin's Orchid Garden" | 3:18 |
| 14. | "Nothing Like You've Ever Known" | 3:11 |
| 15. | "Chi il bel sogno di Doretta" | 2:46 |
| Total length: | | 51:21 |

== Charts ==
| Chart (2002) | Peak position |
|---|---|
| Swedish Album Chart | 1 |
| U.S. Billboard Top Classical Crossover Albums | 2 |
| U.S. Billboard Top 200 Albums | 124 |
