= Song of India (song) =

1937 popular song adapted from Rimsky-Korsakov's 1896 opera Sadko

Single by Tommy Dorsey and His Orchestra
- B-side: "Marie"
- Published: 1897
- Released: February 17, 1937
- Recorded: January 29, 1937
- Genre: Swing
- Length: 3:08
- Label: Victor
- Composer: Nikolai Rimsky-Korsakov

"Song of India" is a popular song adapted from the aria "Pesni︠a︡ indiĭskogo gosti︠a︡" (Song of the Indian Guest) from Rimsky-Korsakov's 1896 opera Sadko. The melody was also used for the 1918 song "Beautiful Ohio", which became the official song of the U.S. State of Ohio.

== Tommy Dorsey recording ==
In January 1937, Tommy Dorsey recorded an instrumental jazz arrangement featuring Bunny Berigan on trumpet, which became a jazz standard. Coupled with "Marie", the 78 rpm disc (Victor #25523) was a major hit for Dorsey, containing two of his most enduring recordings on one record, and which helped make him and his band into a household name as a popular music artist in the United States.

== Other recordings ==
- Paul Whiteman also recorded a foxtrot arrangement of the song in 1921.
- Guy Lombardo and His Royal Canadians recorded the song in 1936
- Glen Gray and the Casa Loma Orchestra recorded the song in 1938
- Mario Lanza recorded the song in 1953 with lyrics by Johnny Mercer.
- Ted Heath in 1957
- The Ramsey Lewis Trio in 1959
- 1964 version by The New Tommy Dorsey Orchestra directed by Sam Donahue with Larry O'Brien
- The Glenn Miller Orchestra under the direction of Buddy DeFranco in 1967
- Joe Loss and His Orchestra in 1970
- Enoch Light and the Light Brigade in 1973
- Another recording was Danny Gatton's Redneck Jazz Explosion in 1978.
- Sarah Brightman on her 2013 album Dreamchaser.
