= The Adventures of the Love Crusader =

Single by Sarah Brightman and the Starship Troopers
- Released: 1979
- Recorded: 1979
- Genre: Pop, disco
- Label: Ariola

Sarah Brightman singles chronology
"I Lost My Heart to a Starship Trooper" (1978)	"The Adventures of the Love Crusader" (1979)	"Love in a UFO" (1981)

"The Adventures of the Love Crusader" is a 1979 single by Sarah Brightman and the Starship Troopers. The single peaked at No. 53 in the UK charts.

Some pressings were made with red vinyl, and came with a comic book using the song lyrics as the dialogue.

== Track listing ==
1. "The Adventures of the Love Crusader"
2. "Lost in Space (The Nurgon Zone)"
