= Doretta's Dream =

Single by Sarah Brightman
- Released: 1987
- Recorded: 1987
- Genre: Musical theatre
- Label: Polydor Records
- Songwriter(s): Giacomo Puccini, Charles Hart

Sarah Brightman singles chronology
"Wishing You Were Somehow Here Again / The Music of the Night" (1986)	"Doretta's Dream" (1987)	"Anything But Lonely" (1989)

"Doretta's Dream" is a 1987 single by Sarah Brightman. The song is based on the aria "Chi il bel sogno di Doretta" ("Doretta's Beautiful Dream") from Giacomo Puccini's opera La Rondine. New English lyrics were written by Charles Hart.

== Track listing ==
1. "Doretta's Dream" (Theme from A Room with a View) (Charles Hart, Giacomo Puccini)
2. "O mio babbino caro" (Giacomo Puccini)
