= Fly (Sarah Brightman album) =

1995 album by Sarah Brightman

Studio album by Sarah Brightman
- Released: 1995
- Recorded: 1995
- Studio: Nemo Studios (London, England); Nemo Studios (Hamburg, Germany); The Hit Factory (New York, NY); Metropolis Studios (London, England); Chateau du Pape (Hamburg, Germany)
- Genre: Classical crossover
- Length: Original release 48:45; 1996 re-release 52:51
- Label: East West
- Producer: Frank Peterson

Sarah Brightman chronology
Dive (1993)	Fly (1995)	Timeless (1997)

Alternative cover
- 2006 Japanese edition

Singles from Fly
- 1. "A Question of Honour" Released: 1995; 2. "Heaven Is Here" Released: 1995; 3. "How Can Heaven Love Me" Released: 1995; 4. "Time to Say Goodbye" Released: 1996

Professional ratings
Review scores
Source	Rating
AllMusic	4/5 stars

Fly is the fourth album by English soprano Sarah Brightman. It is her second album with producer Frank Peterson and features collaborations with Tom Jones, Chris Thompson and Andrew Eldritch. Fly boasts a stronger pop and rock influence than Brightman's previous Broadway and operatic albums, and produced several hits in Europe including "A Question of Honour" and "Time to Say Goodbye".

Since its original 1995 release, Fly is one of Brightman's few albums to undergo multiple reissues in different markets. The first reissue of Fly was in 1996 to include Brightman's hit single "Time to Say Goodbye" with Andrea Bocelli. Fly II, a two-disc limited edition which featured unreleased b-sides and other material, was later released in 2000 to support Brightman's La Luna World Tour and could only be purchased at participating tour events. In 2006, Fly was re-reissued in Japan with the original 1995 track listing, along with four bonus tracks and new artwork. Although Fly is available in several countries, it has yet to be officially released in the United States.

== Track listing ==
No.	Title	Writer(s)	Length
1.	"The Fly"	Frank Peterson, Sarah Brightman	2:56
2.	"Why"	Peterson, Brightman	5:10
3.	"Murder In Mairyland Park"	Stina Nordenstam	3:39
4.	"How Can Heaven Love Me" (feat. Chris Thompson)	Peterson, Christensen, Dorell	3:44
5.	"A Question of Honour"	Peterson	6:34
6.	"Ghost In The Machinery"	Peterson, Ravenhill	4:23
7.	"You Take My Breath Away"	Peterson, Brightman	6:49
8.	"Something In The Air" (feat. Tom Jones)	Peterson, Thomas Schwarz, Matthias Meissner, Brightman	4:22
9.	"Heaven Is Here"	Peterson, Schwarz, Meissner, Brightman	4:03
10.	"I Loved You"	Peterson, Schwarz, Meissner, Brightman	4:10
11.	"Fly"	Peterson, Brightman	2:51
Total length:			48:45

== 1996 re-release ==
No.	Title	Writer(s)	Length
1.	"Time To Say Goodbye (Con Te Partirò)" (feat. Andrea Bocelli)	Francesco Sartori, Lucio Quarantotto	4:07
2.	"The Fly"	Peterson, Brightman	2:55
3.	"Why"	Peterson, Brightman	5:10
4.	"Murder In Mairyland Park"	Nordenstam	3:39
5.	"How Can Heaven Love Me" (feat. Chris Thompson)	Peterson, Christensen, Dorell	3:44
6.	"A Question of Honour"	Peterson	6:34
7.	"Ghost In The Machinery"	Peterson, Ravenhill	4:23
8.	"You Take My Breath Away"	Peterson, Brightman	6:49
9.	"Something In The Air" (feat. Tom Jones)	Peterson, Christensen, Filz	4:22
10.	"Heaven Is Here"	Peterson, Schwarz, Meissner, Brightman	4:03
11.	"I Loved You"	Peterson, Schwarz, Meissner, Brightman	4:10
12.	"Fly"	Peterson, Brightman	2:51
Total length:			52:51

== 2000 re-release: Fly II (La Luna Tour Special Limited Edition) ==
=== Disc 1 ===
No.	Title	Writer(s)	Length
1.	"The Fly"	Peterson/Brightman	2:56
2.	"Why"	Peterson/Brightman	5:10
3.	"Murder In Mairyland Park"	Nordenstam	3:38
4.	"How Can Heaven Love Me" (feat. Chris Thompson)	Peterson/Christensen/Dorell	3:44
5.	"A Question of Honour"	Peterson	6:34
6.	"Ghost In The Machinery"	Peterson/Ravenhill	4:23
7.	"You Take My Breath Away"	Peterson/Brightman	6:49
8.	"Something in the Air" (feat. Tom Jones)	Peterson/Schwarz/Meissner/Brightman	4:22
9.	"Heaven Is Here"	Peterson/Schwarz/Meissner/Brightman	4:02
10.	"I Loved You"	Peterson/Schwarz/Meissner/Brightman	4:10
11.	"Fly"	Peterson/Brightman	2:51
Total length:			48:45

=== Disc 2 – Rare tracks ===
No.	Title	Writer(s)	Length
1.	"Once In A Lifetime" (1996 Remix)		4:17
2.	"First Of May" (Live)	Bee Gees	3:07
3.	"How Can Heaven Love Me" (PeCh's Favorite Radio Edit)		3:36
4.	"Desert Rose"	Peterson/Wagner/Silveria	2:09
5.	"Do You Wanna Be Loved?"	Peterson/Schwarz/Meissner/Brightman	4:19
6.	"Hurry Home"	Steve Thompson	3:47
7.	"The Same Thing To You"		3:18
8.	"Rain"	Nicola Brightman	3:39
9.	"He Moved Through The Fair"	Traditional	2:18
10.	"Starship Troopers" (D-Bop's Saturday Nite Radio Edit)	Jeff Calvert/Geraint Hughes	3:33
11.	"On The Nile"	Robert and Richard Sherman/Sarah Brightman	1:12
12.	"How Can Heaven Love Me" (Video Version)		3:47
13.	"Once In A Lifetime" (Ballad Version)		3:34
Total length:			42:41

== 2006 re-release (Japan) ==
No.	Title	Writer(s)	Length
1.	"The Fly"	Peterson/Brightman	2:56
2.	"Why"	Peterson/Brightman	5:10
3.	"Murder In Mairyland Park"	Nordenstam	3:38
4.	"How Can Heaven Love Me" (feat. Chris Thompson)	Peterson/Christensen/Dorell	3:44
5.	"A Question of Honour"	Peterson	6:34
6.	"Ghost In The Machinery"	Peterson/Ravenhill	4:24
7.	"You Take My Breath Away"	Peterson/Brightman	6:49
8.	"Something In The Air" (feat. Tom Jones)	Peterson/Schwarz/Meissner/Brightman	4:22
9.	"Heaven Is Here"	Peterson/Schwarz/Meissner/Brightman	4:03
10.	"I Loved You"	Peterson/Schwarz/Meissner/Brightman	4:09
11.	"Fly"	Peterson/Brightman	2:53
12.	"Do You Wanna Be Loved?"	Peterson/Schwarz/Meissner/Brightman	4:20
13.	"How Can Heaven Love Me" (Video Version)		3:47
14.	"A Question Of Honour" (Alternative Radio Version)		2:57
15.	"On The Nile"	Robert and Richard Sherman/Brightman	1:10
Total length:			61:02

== Singles ==
- "A Question of Honour" (1995)
- "Heaven Is Here" (1995)
- "How Can Heaven Love Me" (1995)
- "Time to Say Goodbye" (with Andrea Bocelli) (1996)

== Charts and certifications ==
=== Weekly charts ===
Chart (1995)	Peak position
Austrian Albums (Ö3 Austria)	16
German Albums (Offizielle Top 100)	20
Japanese Albums (Oricon)	123
Swiss Albums (Schweizer Hitparade)	30

=== Year-end charts ===
Chart (1997)	Position
German Albums Chart	99

=== Certifications and sales ===
Region	Certification	Certified units/sales
Germany (BVMI)	Gold	250,000^{^}
^{^} Shipments figures based on certification alone.
