= How Can Heaven Love Me =

Single by Sarah Brightman

from the album Fly
- Released: 1995
- Recorded: 1994
- Genre: Classical Crossover
- Label: East West Records
- Songwriter(s): Alex Christensen, David Stephen Charles Dorrell, Peter Frank
- Producer(s): Frank Peterson; Alex Christensen

Sarah Brightman singles chronology
"A Question of Honour" (1995)	"How Can Heaven Love Me" (1995)	"Heaven Is Here" (1995)

Sarah Brightman & Chris Thompson singles chronology
"How Can Heaven Love Me" (1995)	"I Will Be with You" (2007)

"How Can Heaven Love Me" is a 1995 single by soprano Sarah Brightman and Chris Thompson, from her album Fly.

Andrew Eldritch from Sisters of Mercy provided the vocals for the German interlude in the song. This is the first of two collaborations with Chris Thompson; the second being the single version of "Where the Lost Ones Go" in 2007.

The original 1995 release of the album features a 'softer' version of the song, however the 1996 re-issue includes the video version.

In Brightman's Diva Video collection, she mentions that when director David Mallet was making a video for this song, he wrecked his leg and sat on a wheelchair.

== Track listing ==
1. "How Can Heaven Love Me" (Radio Version)
2. "How Can Heaven Love Me" (Video Version)
3. "How Can Heaven Love Me" (Album Version)
4. "How Can Heaven Love Me" (Pop Version)
5. "How Can Heaven Love Me" (PeCh's Favourite mix)
6. "How Can Heaven Love Me" (Extended mix)
7. "How Can Heaven Love Me" (Knock Out mix)
8. "How Can Heaven Love Me" (Damage Control mix)
9. "How Can Heaven Love Me" (PeCh/Sir Sholt remix)
10. "How Can Heaven Love Me" (Tranceliner remix)

== Music video ==
This starts with Sarah Brightman running and dancing around the dungeon while the camcorders and lights focus on her dropping on the floor. She next appears as an angel sitting on the side of the bed the friars carry with a background of stars and clouds and puts up a big red and black pennant surrounded by about four torches. She watches Chris Thompson on the big screen and they both are revealed being handcuffed together. She hangs on to a tree blown in the wind that blows away the leaves and the long grass, appears in a red Mandarin dress that sparkles standing underneath the entrance and pulls up the ropes that connect the red rubber with water wearing a latex suit of the same color. She also appears as a construction girl in front of the metal fence and she, except her arms, is still tied up to the chair in ribbons under the light having her face unwrapped while he broadcasts on the radio station inquiring in German. She then appears as a countess holding the English dogs on the leashes with a quick scene where she has been locked up in jail even when she is portrayed an innocent lady. This ends with all scenes cutting rapidly with footages from the 1940s and 1950s, portraying scenes of Stalin's USSR and the Cold War terror.

"How Can Heaven Love Me"
Sample of How Can Heaven Love Me.
