= The Symphony World Tour =

2008–09 concert tour by Sarah Brightman

- Tour by Sarah Brightman
- Location: Asia; Europe; North America
- Start date: 16 January 2008
- End date: 5 April 2009
- No. of shows: 53

Sarah Brightman concert chronology
- Harem World Tour (2004); The Symphony World Tour (2008/2009); Sarah Brightman in Concert (2009)

The Symphony World Tour was the fourth worldwide concert tour by English soprano singer Sarah Brightman. The tour started on 4 November 2008 in the city of Monterrey and concluded on 5 April 2009 in Taipei. There were special guests that joined Brightman during select tour dates: Argentinean's Fernando Lima, Italy's Alessandro Safina, and Greece's Mario Frangoulis. The tour concept was a journey through the musical career that Sarah Brightman has had so far (three decades) and includes several high-tech virtual scenery that takes the audience from an enchanted forest, baroque lamps to an atmosphere of fairytales. Much anticipation surrounded The Symphony World Tour especially since the production cost was reportedly more than $2 million and involved more than 100 tons of equipment.

== Set List ==
1. Sanvean (Instrumental)
2. Gothica
3. Fleurs Du Mal
4. Let It Rain
5. Symphony
6. Forbidden Colours (Interlude)
7. What A Wonderful World
8. Dust in the Wind
9. Nella Fantasia
10. Hijo de la Luna
11. La Luna
12. Sarahbande (Interlude)
13. Anytime, Anywhere
14. Storia D'Amore
15. Canto della Terra (with Mario Frangoulis in the US, Alessandro Safina for the rest of the world)
16. Attesa

Intermission

1. You Take My Breath Away
2. The Phantom of the Opera (with Mario Frangoulis in the US, Alessandro Safina for the rest of the world)
3. Sarai Qui (with Alessandro Safina)
4. I've Been This Way Before
5. Red Riding Hood Rap
6. First of May
7. I Believe in Father Christmas
8. Pasión (with Fernando Lima)
9. Ave Maria (with Fernando Lima) at some shows
10. Time to Say Goodbye
11. Deliver Me
12. Running
13. You And Me

Notes

- Sarai Qui was performed only during shows when Alessandro Safina was the special guest
- You & Me was an additional 3rd encore and performed at least during the 1 April 2009 show in Hong Kong and 4 April 2009 show in Taipei.

== Tour dates ==
List of 2008 concerts
Date	City	Country	Venue	Attendance	Revenue
16 January 2008	Vienna	Austria	Stephansdom	—N/a	—N/a
4 November 2008	Monterrey	Mexico	Arena Monterrey	—N/a	—N/a
6 November 2008	Guadalajara	Mexico	Arena VFG	11,974 / 11,974	$598,102
8 November 2008	Mexico City	Mexico	Palacio de los Deportes	19,566 / 23,928	$1,185,632
9 November 2008	Mexico City	Mexico	Palacio de los Deportes	19,566 / 23,928	$1,185,632
12 November 2008	Dallas	United States	American Airlines Center	—N/a	—N/a
14 November 2008	Orlando	United States	UCF Arena	4,620 / 6,152	$534,005
15 November 2008	Sunrise	United States	BankAtlantic Center	6,830 / 11,795	$627,812
16 November 2008	Tampa	United States	St. Pete Times Forum	4,594 / 12,483	$491,235
18 November 2008	Duluth	United States	Arena at Gwinnett Center	—N/a	—N/a
19 November 2008	Washington, D.C.	United States	Verizon Center	—N/a	—N/a
22 November 2008	Mashantucket	United States	MGM Grand Theater	—N/a	—N/a
23 November 2008	New York City	United States	Madison Square Garden	7,151 / 9,949	$791,669
24 November 2008	Boston	United States	TD Banknorth Garden	4,133 / 6,457	$432,337
26 November 2008	Montreal	Canada	Bell Centre	5,816 / 8,850	$436,971
28 November 2008	Ottawa	Canada	Scotiabank Place	4,095 / 4,500	$271,350
29 November 2008	Hamilton	Canada	Copps Coliseum	5,607 / 5,800	$373,276
30 November 2008	Toronto	Canada	Air Canada Centre	7,973 / 8,200	$539,371
2 December 2008	Cleveland	United States	Quicken Loans Arena	—N/a	—N/a
3 December 2008	Auburn Hills	United States	The Palace of Auburn Hills	2,787 / 4,517	$282,024
4 December 2008	Rosemont	United States	Allstate Arena	—N/a	—N/a
6 December 2008	Winnipeg	Canada	MTS Centre	—N/a	—N/a
7 December 2008	Regina	Canada	Brandt Centre	—N/a	—N/a
8 December 2008	Calgary	Canada	Pengrowth Saddledome	—N/a	—N/a
10 December 2008	Edmonton	Canada	Rexall Place	5,401 / 9,800	$378,490
12 December 2008	Vancouver	Canada	General Motors Place	—N/a	—N/a
13 December 2008	Victoria	Canada	Save-On-Foods Memorial Centre	—N/a	—N/a
14 December 2008	Everett	United States	Everett Events Center	—N/a	—N/a
16 December 2008	Sacramento	United States	ARCO Arena	5,228 / 5,722	$367,495
17 December 2008	San Jose	United States	HP Pavilion	7,492 / 7,792	$565,552
19 December 2008	Anaheim	United States	Theater at the Honda Center	5,234 / 5,234	$542,225
20 December 2008	Inglewood	United States	The Forum	—N/a	—N/a
21 December 2008	Glendale	United States	Jobing.com Arena	5,683 / 5,683	$485,993

List of 2009 concerts
Date	City	Country	Venue	Attendance	Revenue
23 February 2009	Tokyo	Japan	Nippon Budokan	—N/a	—N/a
25 February 2009	Fukuoka	Japan	Marine Messe	—N/a	—N/a
27 February 2009	Nagoya	Japan	Nippon Gaishi Hall	—N/a	—N/a
2 March 2009	Osaka	Japan	Osaka-Jo Hall	—N/a	—N/a
4 March 2009	Tokyo	Japan	Nippon Budokan	—N/a	—N/a
5 March 2009	Tokyo	Japan	Nippon Budokan	—N/a	—N/a
7 March 2009	Kuala Lumpur	Malaysia	Plenary Hall	—N/a	—N/a
10 March 2009	Jakarta	Indonesia	Jakarta Convention Center	—N/a	—N/a
13 March 2009	Seoul	South Korea	Olympic Gymnastics Arena	—N/a	—N/a
14 March 2009	Seoul	South Korea	Olympic Gymnastics Arena	—N/a	—N/a
16 March 2009	Ilsan	South Korea	KINTEX Event Hall	—N/a	—N/a
20 March 2009	Busan	South Korea	BEXCO Center	—N/a	—N/a
22 March 2009	Beijing	China	Capital Indoor Stadium	—N/a	—N/a
25 March 2009	Nanjing	China	Nanjing Olympic Sports Centre	—N/a	—N/a
27 March 2009	Shanghai	China	Shanghai Grand Stage	—N/a	—N/a
28 March 2009	Shanghai	China	Shanghai Grand Stage	—N/a	—N/a
30 March 2009	Guangzhou	China	Guangzhou Gymnasium	—N/a	—N/a
1 April 2009	Chek Lap Kok	Hong Kong	AsiaWorld–Arena	—N/a	—N/a
4 April 2009	Taipei	Taiwan	Taipei Arena	—N/a	—N/a
5 April 2009	Taipei	Taiwan	Taipei Arena	—N/a	—N/a
Total				114,184 / 148,836 (77%)	$8,903,539
