= Bella Voce (group) =

Chicago-based a cappella choir

Bella Voce (It., beautiful voice) is a Chicago-based chamber chorus specializing in classical a cappella music. It has been called "Chicago's premier professional chamber choir."

The group was founded in 1982 by countertenor Richard Childress as His Majestie's Clerkes. In 1990, His Majestie's Clerkes was awarded National Public Radio's Lucien Wulsin Award for best small ensemble. The group was renamed in 2001. The group's performances are usually of early and contemporary European music. Originally performing music of the English Tudor period, the name Bella Voce was chosen as the performances of His Majestie's Clerkes took on broader interests.

Noted guest conductors of the group have included Sir David Willcocks, Paul Hillier, Simon Preston and Alice Parker. In 1990, HMC was awarded NPR's Lucien Wulsin Award for best small ensemble. Bella Voce won the Alice Parker-ASCAP-Chorus America Award for adventurous programming in 2004. The group has released many CDs of choral music. It has been described as "an innovative and superbly polished a cappella ensemble." Like other classical music ensembles, it has experienced funding difficulties, alleviated in part by grants from organizations sponsoring the arts.

The group was led for many years by Anne Heider, artistic director, and Tamara Schupman, managing director. Heider is a choral conductor at the Roosevelt University's Chicago College of Performing Arts, sings alto with the Chicago Sacred Harp singers and researches shape-note singing related to the Midwest.

Schupman is a Choral Assistant for the Northwest Bach Festival, and a member of the Chamber Singers of Chicago.

Chicago Tribune music critic John von Rhein praised the group's "fine musicianship, careful blending of voices, burnished sound and stylistic versatility' as exhibited on their 2006 CD "American A Capella," recorded from concerts in 2004 and 2005.

Following Heider's retirement, Andrew Lewis became the artistic director, starting with the 2005–06 season. Lewis is musical director of the Elgin Choral Union, a former artistic director of the Lutheran Choir of Chicago, founder and artistic director of The Janus Ensemble, and cantor of Immanuel Lutheran Church of Evanston, Illinois. He also is a member of the conducting faculty at the University of Illinois, Chicago. Chicago Sun Times critic Dorothy Andries described the sound of Bella Voce under Lewis as "like honey, rich and shining, with soprano voices soaring above the altos, tenors and basses, like light through darkness." Von Rhein praised the group in 2007 as "singing with the pure tone, clear vowels and firm blend of an English cathedral choir" and said that "melodic leaps, intricately laced part-writing and other musical hurdles were met most handsomely by the 23-member chorus."
