= The Harem Tour =

Compilation album by Sarah Brightman
- Released: 2003
- Recorded: 1995–2003
- Genre: Pop/Rock/Operatic pop/Dance
- Label: No label is named in the album
- Producer: Frank Peterson

Sarah Brightman chronology
Harem (2003)	The Harem Tour (2003)	The Harem World Tour: Live from Las Vegas (2004)

The Harem Tour is a limited edition album consisting of b-sides, demos, and other rarities by classical crossover soprano Sarah Brightman. It was released in CD format only and sold at Brightman's "The Harem World Tour" events and, after the tour concluded, from her web site. No label company, catalog number or copyright warning is mentioned on the CD packaging.

== Track listing ==
No.	Title	Length
1.	"Kama Sutra"	2:24
2.	"Join Me"	4:14
3.	"My Imagination"	3:50
4.	"Don't Give Up"	6:26
5.	"Forbidden Colours"	4:30
6.	"The Smile"	5:15
7.	"Pay No Mind"	3:57
8.	"A Question of Honour" (Extended Version)	8:45
9.	"Voyage Voyage"	4:12
10.	"Colours of the Rainbow"	4:19
11.	"The Secret Still Remains"	3:37
12.	"I've Seen It All"	4:25
13.	"Watermark"	2:30
Total length:		48:36

- Tracks 2, 4, and 9 have been released previously on Gregorian Masters of Chant albums.
- Track 6 and 12 were released on Schiller's album in 2003.
- Track 8 was released on the brown Question of Honour single in 1995.
- Track 11 was released on Sash! "S4" in 2002

== Track information ==
- Kama Sutra: originally slated for the opening song of the Harem album
- Join Me: cover of song originally performed by the band HIM, previously released on Gregorian's 3rd album
- My Imagination: recorded during the time between La Luna and Harem
- Don't Give Up: Sarah's first collaboration with Gregorian, originally performed by Peter Gabriel and Kate Bush
- Forbidden Colours: unfinished song recorded during the La Luna sessions. It has since been released on Sarah's 2008 album, Symphony, as a bonus track.
- The Smile: recorded with Schiller
- Pay No Mind: originally meant for inclusion on Eden
- A Question of Honour: extended version from the first single release
- Voyage Voyage: yet another collaboration with Gregorian, originally performed by Desireless
- Colours of the Rainbow: recorded during the Harem sessions
- The Secret Still Remains: guest vocalist on song by the group Sash!
- I've Seen It All: recorded with the group Schiller
- Watermark: vocalise version of the Enya track originally slated for release on Timeless. Enya's label threatened to put an injunction on the album if this track was included, so it was left off.
