= Harem World Tour =

2004 concert tour by Sarah Brightman

- Tour by Sarah Brightman
- Location: Asia; Australia; Europe; North America
- Associated album: Harem
- Start date: 10 January 2004
- End date: 23 December 2004
- Legs: 5
- No. of shows: 117
- Box office: $60 million

Sarah Brightman concert chronology
- La Luna World Tour (2000–01); Harem World Tour (2004); The Symphony World Tour (2008)

The Harem World Tour was the third worldwide concert tour by English soprano singer Sarah Brightman following the release of the Harem album (2003). The tour began on 10 January 2004 in Mexico City and concluded on 23 December that year in Tokyo, Japan. The Harem tour became Brightman's highest-grossing tour, collecting $60 million in revenue and sold 800,000 tickets, $15 million and 225,000 sales of which came from the North American leg. The tour brought Brightman to perform in 4 continents, 28 countries in 119 venues.

== Background ==
In May 2003 Sarah released her Middle East-oriented album Harem. To promote it together with audiovisual project "Harem – A Desert Fantasy" Brightman in collaboration with Clear Channel Entertainment decided to create a new tour, that will be different from the previous La Luna World Tour. Promoters wanted to turn show from theater audiences to a more arena-like. Promotion for the tour included many billboards and ads in theaters and corresponding media because some of Sarah's fans "haven't experienced arena shows very well". The European leg of the tour was initially planned for April and May but was postponed to the autumn of the same year due to logistical difficulties.

== Set List ==
1. Kama Sutra
2. Harem
3. Beautiful
4. It's a Beautiful Day
5. Dust in the Wind
6. Who Wants to Live Forever
7. Anytime, Anywhere
8. Nella Fantasia
9. Stranger in Paradise
10. La Luna
11. Nessun Dorma

Intermission

1. No One Like You
2. Arabian Nights
3. The War Is Over
4. Free
5. What a Wonderful World
6. A Whiter Shade of Pale
7. Phantom of the Opera medley:
  1. Twisted Every Way
  2. Overture
  3. Little Lottie
8. Wishing You Were Somehow Here Again
9. Time to Say Goodbye
10. The Journey Home
11. A Question of Honour

== Tour dates ==
List of 2004 concerts
Date	City	Country	Venue	Attendance	Revenue
10 January 2004	Mexico City	Mexico	Palacio de los Deportes	12,409 / 13,305	$478,884
13 January 2004	Dallas	United States	American Airlines Center	7,246 / 8,073	$400,505
14 January 2004	Houston	United States	Toyota Center	6,851 / 11,310	$401,250
16 January 2004	Sunrise	United States	Office Depot Center	7,685 / 11,875	$692,550
17 January 2004	Lakeland	United States	Jenkins Arena	4,529 / 6,297	$291,210
19 January 2004	Duluth	United States	Arena at Gwinnett Center	4,940 / 7,180	$418,690
21 January 2004	Philadelphia	United States	Wachovia Center	6,091 / 12,783	$358,970
23 January 2004	New York City	United States	Madison Square Garden	7,838 / 10,905	$654,314
24 January 2004	Uncasville	United States	Mohegan Sun Arena	—N/a	—N/a
25 January 2004	University Park	United States	Bryce Jordan Center	—N/a	—N/a
27 January 2004	Columbus	United States	Schottenstein Center	3,384 / 5,356	$224,935
29 January 2004	Washington, D.C.	United States	MCI Center	5,420 / 16,881	$447,035
30 January 2004	Atlantic City	United States	Mark G. Etess Arena	—N/a	—N/a
31 January 2004	Boston	United States	Fleet Center	7,460 / 16,905	$495,980
2 February 2004	Montreal	Canada	Bell Centre	6,094 / 6,500	$396,570
3 February 2004	Ottawa	Canada	Corel Centre	—N/a	—N/a
5 February 2004	Toronto	Canada	Air Canada Centre	11,147 / 11,808	$603,935
6 February 2004	Hamilton	Canada	Copps Coliseum	—N/a	—N/a
7 February 2004	Rochester	United States	Blue Cross Arena	—N/a	—N/a
9 February 2004	Auburn Hills	United States	The Palace of Auburn Hills	5,259 / 10,389	$309,520
10 February 2004	Cleveland	United States	Gund Arena	5,077 / 8,730	$390,025
12 February 2004	Moline	United States	iWireless Center	—N/a	—N/a
13 February 2004	St. Louis	United States	Savvis Center	—N/a	—N/a
15 February 2004	Kansas City	United States	Kemper Arena	—N/a	—N/a
18 February 2004	Rosemont	United States	Allstate Arena	4,685 / 10,505	$417,150
19 February 2004	Milwaukee	United States	Bradley Center	3,352 / 5,973	$223,740
20 February 2004	Minneapolis	United States	Target Center	3,657 / 5,479	$237,582
22 February 2004	Winnipeg	Canada	Winnipeg Arena	—N/a	—N/a
24 February 2004	Calgary	Canada	Pengrowth Saddledome	—N/a	—N/a
25 February 2004	Edmonton	Canada	Rexall Place	5,357 / 6,033	$305,616
27 February 2004	Vancouver	Canada	General Motors Place	6,137 / 8,019	$368,590
29 February 2004	Seattle	United States	KeyArena	6,238 / 6,738	$425,771
1 March 2004	Portland	United States	Rose Garden Arena	4,347 / 7,073	$242,095
2 March 2004	Spokane	United States	Star Theatre	3,850 / 3,850	$226,104
5 March 2004	Reno	United States	Lawlor Events Center	3,682 / 5,000	$233,250
6 March 2004	Salt Lake City	United States	Delta Center	—N/a	—N/a
7 March 2004	Denver	United States	Magness Arena	—N/a	—N/a
9 March 2004	Phoenix	United States	America West Arena	6,110 / 8,008	$347,095
10 March 2004	San Diego	United States	San Diego Sports Arena	—N/a	—N/a
13 March 2004	Las Vegas	United States	MGM Grand Garden Arena	6,178 / 9,560	$532,653
14 March 2004	Anaheim	United States	Arrowhead Pond of Anaheim	5,896 / 10,095	$497,885
15 March 2004	Fresno	United States	Save Mart Center	5,919 / 7,396	$374,165
17 March 2004	Sacramento	United States	ARCO Arena	5,915 / 7,610	$340,648
18 March 2004	San Jose	United States	HP Pavilion	6,977 / 7,725	$437,626
28 May 2004	Wan Chai	Hong Kong	HKCEC Auditorium	—N/a	—N/a
30 May 2004	Beijing	China	Capital Indoor Stadium	—N/a	—N/a
31 May 2004	Beijing	China	Capital Indoor Stadium	—N/a	—N/a
3 June 2004	Shanghai	China	Shanghai Grand Stage	—N/a	—N/a
6 June 2004	Guangzhou	China	Tianhe Stadium	—N/a	—N/a
8 June 2004	Seoul	South Korea	Olympic Stadium	—N/a	—N/a
9 June 2004	Seoul	South Korea	Olympic Stadium	—N/a	—N/a
11 June 2004	Sapporo	Japan	Makomanai Ice Arena	—N/a	—N/a
14 June 2004	Tokyo	Japan	Budokan Hall	—N/a	—N/a
15 June 2004	Nagoya	Japan	Rainbow Hall	—N/a	—N/a
16 June 2004	Osaka	Japan	Osaka-Jo Hall	—N/a	—N/a
18 June 2004	Kallang	Singapore	Singapore Indoor Stadium	—N/a	—N/a
20 June 2004	Kuala Lumpur	Malaysia	Stadium Negara	—N/a	—N/a
21 June 2004	Hanoi	Vietnam	My Dinh National Stadium	—N/a	—N/a
23 June 2004	Pasig	Philippines	PhilSports Arena	—N/a	—N/a
25 June 2004	Taipei	Taiwan	Linkou Gym	—N/a	—N/a
26 June 2004	Taipei	Taiwan	Linkou Gym	—N/a	—N/a
29 June 2004	Perth	Australia	Burswood Dome	—N/a	—N/a
2 July 2004	Sydney	Australia	Sydney Entertainment Centre	—N/a	—N/a
4 July 2004	Brisbane	Australia	Brisbane Entertainment Centre	—N/a	—N/a
6 July 2004	Melbourne	Australia	Rod Laver Arena	—N/a	—N/a
8 July 2004	Adelaide	Australia	Adelaide Entertainment Centre	—N/a	—N/a
3 September 2004	Athens	Greece	Lycabettus Theatre	—N/a	—N/a
4 September 2004	Athens	Greece	Lycabettus Theatre	—N/a	—N/a
6 September 2004	Bucharest	Romania	Central Square	—N/a	—N/a
8 September 2004	Budapest	Hungary	Budapest Arena	—N/a	—N/a
9 September 2004	Prague	Czech Republic	T-Mobile Arena	—N/a	—N/a
11 September 2004	Vilnius	Lithuania	Siemens Arena	—N/a	—N/a
13 September 2004	Riga	Latvia	Skonto Hall	—N/a	—N/a
15 September 2004	Moscow	Russia	Olimpiyskiy	—N/a	—N/a
17 September 2004	Saint Petersburg	Russia	Ice Palace	—N/a	—N/a
19 September 2004	Tallinn	Estonia	Saku Suurhall	—N/a	—N/a
21 September 2004	Helsinki	Finland	Hartwall Areena	—N/a	—N/a
23 September 2004	Stockholm	Sweden	Stockholm Globe Arena	—N/a	—N/a
25 September 2004	Gothenburg	Sweden	Scandinavium	—N/a	—N/a
26 September 2004	Oslo	Norway	Oslo Spektrum	—N/a	—N/a
28 September 2004	Amsterdam	Netherlands	Heineken Music Hall	—N/a	—N/a
29 September 2004	Amsterdam	Netherlands	Heineken Music Hall	—N/a	—N/a
1 October 2004	Frankfurt	Germany	Festhalle Frankfurt	—N/a	—N/a
2 October 2004	Brussels	Belgium	Forest National	—N/a	—N/a
5 October 2004	Dublin	Ireland	Simmonscourt Pavilion	—N/a	—N/a
7 October 2004	London	England	Wembley Arena	—N/a	—N/a
22 October 2004	Halifax	Canada	Halifax Metro Centre	—N/a	—N/a
24 October 2004	Quebec City	Canada	Colisée Pepsi	—N/a	—N/a
25 October 2004	Montreal	Canada	Bell Centre	—N/a	—N/a
27 October 2004	Worcester	United States	Worcester Centrum	—N/a	—N/a
28 October 2004	Hershey	United States	Giant Center	—N/a	—N/a
30 October 2004	Pittsburgh	United States	Mellon Arena	—N/a	—N/a
31 October 2004	London	Canada	John Labatt Centre	—N/a	—N/a
1 November 2004	Toronto	Canada	Air Canada Centre	7,453 / 10,530	$388,674
3 November 2004	Worcester	United States	Worcester Centrum	—N/a	—N/a
4 November 2004	East Rutherford	United States	Continental Airlines Arena	—N/a	—N/a
5 November 2004	Bridgeport	United States	Arena at Harbor Yard	—N/a	—N/a
6 November 2004	Atlantic City	United States	Mark G. Etess Arena	—N/a	—N/a
8 November 2004	Norfolk	United States	Ted Constant Convocation Center	—N/a	—N/a
9 November 2004	Greenville	United States	BI-LO Center	—N/a	—N/a
11 November 2004	Jacksonville	United States	Jacksonville Veterans Memorial Arena	—N/a	—N/a
12 November 2004	Miami	United States	American Airlines Arena	4,672 / 8,267	$447,650
13 November 2004	Tampa	United States	St. Pete Times Forum	3,063 / 8,007	$275,860
14 November 2004	Atlanta	United States	Philips Arena	—N/a	—N/a
16 November 2004	New Orleans	United States	New Orleans Arena	—N/a	—N/a
17 November 2004	San Antonio	United States	SBC Center	—N/a	—N/a
20 November 2004	Las Vegas	United States	MGM Grand Garden Arena	3,776 / 5,245	$373,118
21 November 2004	Phoenix	United States	America West Arena	3,658 / 7,812	$222,770
22 November 2004	Los Angeles	United States	Staples Center	6,629 / 8,374	$522,500
24 November 2004	Oakland	United States	The Arena in Oakland	—N/a	—N/a
12 December 2004	Nagoya	Japan	Aichi Expo	—N/a	—N/a
15 December 2004	Tokyo	Japan	Prince Hotel Auditorium	—N/a	—N/a
17 December 2004	Yokohama	Japan	National Convention Hall	—N/a	—N/a
19 December 2004	Osaka	Japan	Osaka Festival Hall	—N/a	—N/a
20 December 2004	Nagoya	Japan	Aichi Arts Center	—N/a	—N/a
22 December 2004	Tokyo	Japan	NHK Hall	—N/a	—N/a
23 December 2004	Tokyo	Japan	NHK Hall	—N/a	—N/a
TOTAL				208,981 / 315,596 (66%)	$13,994,915

== Video release ==
The concert in Las Vegas on 13 March was recorded and then made available commercially in CD and DVD entitled The Harem World Tour: Live from Las Vegas.
