= Brokedown Palace (soundtrack) =

Brokedown Palace: Music from the Original Motion Picture Soundtrack

Soundtrack album by Various Artists
- Released: August 10, 1999 (U.S.)
- Label: Island

Brokedown Palace: Music from the Original Motion Picture Soundtrack is the soundtrack album for the film Brokedown Palace, released by Island Records on August 10, 1999 (see 1999 in music).

== Track listing ==
1. "Silence" by Delerium featuring Sarah McLachlan
2. "Party's Just Begun (Again)" by Nelly Furtado, produced by Brian West
3. "Policeman Skank" by Audioweb
4. "Rock the Casbah" by Solar Twins
5. "Damaged" by Plumb
6. "Fingers" by Joi
7. "Contradictive" by Tricky/DJ Muggs
8. "Leave It Alone" by Moist
9. "Naxalite" by Asian Dub Foundation
10. "Even When I'm Sleeping" by Leonardo's Bride
11. "Bangkok" by Brother Sun Sister Moon
12. "The Wind" by PJ Harvey
13. "Deliver Me" by Sarah Brightman
14. "The Arrest/Darlene Goes Home (Score)" by David Newman

== Trivia ==
- The American Alternative band Wild Colonials were asked to record a cover version of the Grateful Dead song "Brokedown Palace" to be used in the film. It was not used due to a problem with sync rights but did appear on the bands film music compilation album Reel Life vol 1 (2000).
