= Free (Sarah Brightman song) =

Single by Sarah Brightman

from the album Harem
- B-side: "Guéri De Toi"
- Released: 10 June 2003
- Recorded: 2002–2003
- Studio: Nemo Studios (Hamburg, Germany); Rudolfinum Studios (Prague, Czech Republic)
- Genre: Classical crossover, Middle Eastern pop
- Length: 3:45
- Label: Angel
- Songwriter(s): Sarah Brightman, Sophie B. Hawkins, Matthias Meissner, Thomas Schwarz
- Producer(s): Frank Peterson

Sarah Brightman singles chronology
| "What You Never Know" (2003) | "Free" (2003) |

"Free" is a song performed by English classical crossover soprano Sarah Brightman from her ninth studio album, Harem (2003). It was originally written in German by Matthias Meissner and Thomas Schwarz. The song was then re-written in English by Brightman in collaboration with Sophie B. Hawkins. The track was produced by Frank Peterson. It was released as the fourth and final single from Harem by Angel Records on 10 June 2003. The song contains prominent classical crossover and Middle Eastern pop musical characters. It is influenced by feelings of desperation and is lyrically about somebody who has lost somebody and is looking onto their relationship with somebody else.

"Free" reached the #3 position on the US Hot Dance Music/Club Play charts. Violinist Nigel Kennedy is featured in the last four stanzas of the song.

== Music video ==
In Harem; a Desert Fantasy, Brightman stands in the middle of a pond surrounded by all the Arabian girls she sings to and in one part, she gives the white dove a lift in the air.

== Track listing ==
=== Digital Single / USA Promotional CD Single ===
1. "Free" (Swiss American Federation Hot AC Mix) 2:58
2. "Free" (Swiss American Federation Modern AC Mix) 3:52
3. "Free" (Album Version) 3:44

=== European Promotional CD Single ===
1. "Free" (Swiss American Federation Hot AC Mix) 2:58
2. "Free" (Swiss American Federation Modern AC Mix) 3:52
3. "Free" (Album Version) 3:44
4. "Guéri De Toi" (Nemo Mix) 3:15

=== DJ Vinyl ===
1. "Free" (Swiss American Federation Club Mix)
2. "Free" (Nemo Remix)
3. "Free" (Swiss American Federation Dub Mix)
4. "Guéri De Toi" (Nemo Remix)
- This was a promo-only release.
