= As I Came of Age =

Studio album by Sarah Brightman
- Released: 1990
- Recorded: November 1988 – October 1989
- Studio: AIR (London, England); Metropolis (London, England); Marcus (London, England); Olympic (London, England); Record One (Los Angeles, California)
- Genre: Vocal
- Length: 43:53
- Label: Polydor
- Producer: Val Garay; Peter Asher

Sarah Brightman chronology
The Songs That Got Away (1989)	As I Came of Age (1990)	Sarah Brightman Sings the Music of Andrew Lloyd Webber (1992)

Professional ratings
Review scores
Source	Rating
AllMusic	4/5 stars

As I Came of Age is the second studio album by English soprano Sarah Brightman, released in 1990 by Polydor Records. The album contains a diverse collection of songs including "Good Morning Starshine" from the musical Hair, "Yesterday" by Aimee Mann, "Love Changes Everything" from Andrew Lloyd Webber's Aspects of Love, and "Some Girls" by Lisa Burns and Sal Maida.

The cover art features an Arthur Hughes painting, The Kings' Orchard (c. 1858), adapted to include an imposed image of Brightman that is based on a Robert Blakeman photograph of her. The original photograph was used as the cover for the corresponding single, "Something to Believe In".

== Track listing ==
No.	Title	Writer(s)	Length
1.	"The River Cried"	Billy Steinberg; Tom Kelly	4:07
2.	"Something to Believe In"	Phil Palmer; Paul Bliss	3:51
3.	"As I Came of Age"	Lisa Burns; Sal Maida	4:25
4.	"Take My Life"	Steinberg; Kelly; Andrew Lloyd Webber	3:50
5.	"Some Girls"	Burns; Maida	3:16
6.	"Brown Eyes"	Phil Everly; John Durrill	3:30
7.	"Love Changes Everything"	Lloyd Webber; Don Black; Charles Hart	3:36
8.	"Good Morning Starshine"	James Rado; Gerome Ragni; Galt MacDermot	3:52
9.	"Alone Again Or"	Bryan MacLean	3:17
10.	"Yesterday (You Stopped Crying)"	Aimee Mann	3:38
11.	"Bowling Green"	Everly; Terri Slater	4:09
12.	"It Must Be Tough...to Be That Cool"	Charlotte Deaver	3:09
Total length:			43:53

== Personnel ==
Adapted from the album's liner notes.

=== Musicians ===
- Sarah Brightman – vocals (all tracks), background vocals (tracks 1, 2, 6, 8–12)
- Peter Asher – arrangement (track 7), tambourine (track 7), claves (track 7)
- Berton Averre – electric guitar (tracks 3, 12), guitars (tracks 9, 10), backing vocals (tracks 9, 10), acoustic guitar (track 12)
- Robbie Buchanan – keyboards (tracks 2–4, 7, 8, 12)
- Paul Buckmaster – string arrangement (track 1)
- Rosemary Butler – backing vocals (tracks 5, 9, 10)
- David Campbell – string arrangement (tracks 4, 7)
- Dermot Crehan – concert master (track 9)
- David Cullen – string arrangement (track 9)
- Stuart Elliott – additional drums (track 5)
- Pavel Farkas – concert master (tracks 4, 7)
- Mike Fisher – percussion (tracks 4, 7)
- Val Garay – finger cymbals, arrangement (tracks 3, 6), tambourine (tracks 4, 8)
- Bob Getter – bass guitar (track 10), double bass (track 11)
- John Giblin – bass guitar (track 5)
- Bob Glaub – bass guitar (tracks 2, 3, 4)
- Andrew Gold – acoustic guitar (track 4), electric guitar (track 4), electric 12 string guitar (track 7)
- Steve Goldstein – keyboards (tracks 1–3, 6, 8–12), percussion (tracks 1–3, 6, 8, 10, 11), special effects programming (track 3), grand piano (tracks 3, 4), arrangement (tracks 3, 6, 8), drum programming (track 5), organ (track 5)
- Jimmie Haskell – string arrangement (track 3)
- Russ Kunkel – drums (tracks 2, 3)
- Michael Landau – electric guitars (tracks 2, 6, 12)
- Arnold McCuller – backing vocals (tracks 5, 10)
- Phil Palmer – acoustic guitars (track 1), electric guitars (tracks 1, 5)
- Sid Sharp – concert master (track 3)
- Leland Sklar – bass guitar (track 7)
- Carlos Vega – drums (tracks 4, 7)
- Waddy Wachtel – acoustic guitar (tracks 2, 3, 8, 11), electric guitars (track 6)
- Gavyn Wright – concert master (track 1)

=== Technical ===
- Val Garay – producer (all tracks)
- Peter Asher – producer (track 7)
- Richard Bosworth – co-recording & mixing engineer
- Steve Goldstein – programming (tracks 1, 5, 6, 8, 10–12)
- Daniel Bosworth – assistant engineer (tracks 1–3, 5, 6, 8–12)
- Geoff Foster – assistant engineer (tracks 1, 5)
- Clark Germaine – assistant engineer (tracks 4, 7)
- Matt Howe – assistant engineer (tracks 1, 8–12)
- Al Stone – assistant engineer (tracks 1, 2)
- Arthur Hughes – original cover painting
- Robert Blakeman – photograph

== Singles ==
- "Something to Believe In" (1990)
