= The Harem World Tour: Live from Las Vegas =

2004 video of a Sarah Brightman concert

- Directed by: Bruce Gowers; David Mallet
- Produced by: Sarah Brightman; Frank Peterson; Paul Morphos; Rocky Oldham
- Starring: Sarah Brightman
- Distributed by: Angel
- Release date: 28 September 2004
- Running time: 110 minutes

The Harem World Tour: Live From Las Vegas (2004) is a live album and video recording of Sarah Brightman's concert held in Las Vegas, part of her global Harem World Tour.

== Video ==
The Harem World Tour: Live From Las Vegas is a video recording of classical crossover soprano Sarah Brightman's tour inspired by her album Harem. It was recorded live at the MGM Grand Garden Arena, Las Vegas on 13 March 2004.

=== Track listing ===
1. "Kama Sutra"
2. "Harem (Cançao do Mar)"
3. "Beautiful"
4. "It's a Beautiful Day"
5. "Dust in the Wind"
6. "Who Wants to Live Forever"
7. "Anytime, Anywhere" (Interlude)
8. "Anytime, Anywhere"
9. "Nella Fantasia"
10. "Stranger in Paradise"
11. "La Luna"
12. "Nessun Dorma"
13. "No One Like You"
14. "Arabian Nights"
15. "The War is Over"
16. "Free"
17. "What a Wonderful World"
18. "A Whiter Shade of Pale"
19. "Phantom of the Opera Suite"
20. "Wishing You Were Somehow Here Again"
21. "Time to Say Goodbye"
22. "The Journey Home"
23. "A Question of Honour"

== Album ==
The Harem World Tour: Live From Las Vegas

Live album by Sarah Brightman
- Released: Germany, UK: 27 September 2004; USA, Japan: 28 September 2004
- Recorded: 13 March 2004
- Genre: Pop; rock; classical crossover; dance
- Length: 65:36
- Producer: Frank Peterson

Sarah Brightman chronology
The Harem Tour (2003)	The Harem World Tour: Live From Las Vegas (2004)	Love Changes Everything (2005)

The Harem World Tour: Live From Las Vegas is a live album by classical crossover soprano Sarah Brightman released to coincide with the DVD. The album was released on 28 September 2004. It features a cover version of Indonesian singer Anggun's "Snow on the Sahara".

Track listing
No.	Title	Length
1.	"Kama Sutra"	2:01
2.	"Harem Overture (Cançao do Mar)"	3:10
3.	"It's a Beautiful Day"	4:27
4.	"Dust in the Wind"	4:02
5.	"Who Wants to Live Forever"	4:02
6.	"Anytime, Anywhere"	3:17
7.	"La Luna"	5:16
8.	"Nessun Dorma"	4:11
9.	"The War is Over"	5:24
10.	"Free"	3:49
11.	"A Whiter Shade of Pale"	3:16
12.	"Phantom of the Opera Suite: Twisted Every Way/Phantom Overture/Little Lottie"	4:27
13.	"Wishing You Were Somehow Here Again"	4:36
14.	"Time to Say Goodbye"	4:14
15.	"A Question of Honour"	5:43
16.	"Snow on the Sahara" (Bonus Studio Track)	4:44
Total length:		65:36

== Charts and certifications ==
=== Charts ===
Chart (2004)	Peak Position
Australian DVD (ARIA Charts)	13
US Billboard Top Classical Crossover Albums	2
Portugal Albums Top 30	19
Dutch Albums Top 100	42
Austria Albums Top 75	49
Mexico Albums Top 100	82
Japanese Oricon Top Weekly Albums	95
US Billboard Top 200 Albums	126

=== Certifications ===
All certifications for the DVD

Region	Certification	Certified units/sales
Argentina (CAPIF)	2× Platinum	16,000^{^}
Canada (Music Canada)	Platinum	10,000^{^}
Mexico (AMPROFON)	Gold	10,000^{^}
^{^} Shipments figures based on certification alone.
