= Anything But Lonely =

Single by Sarah Brightman
- Released: 1989
- Recorded: 1989
- Genre: Musical theatre
- Label: Polydor Records
- Songwriter(s): Andrew Lloyd Webber, Don Black and Charles Hart

Sarah Brightman singles chronology
"Doretta's Dream" (1987)	"Anything But Lonely" (1989)	"Something to Believe In" (1990)

"Anything But Lonely" is a 1989 single by Sarah Brightman. The song is from the musical Aspects of Love. The music was written by Andrew Lloyd Webber and the lyrics by Don Black and Charles Hart. The single peaked at #79 in the UK charts. The song peaked at number 149 in Australia in 1993.

== Track listing ==
=== 7 inch vinyl ===
1. "Anything But Lonely"
2. "Half a Moment"

=== 12-inch vinyl and CD single ===
1. "Anything But Lonely (Andrew Lloyd Webber, Don Black, Charles Hart)
2. "Half a Moment" (Alan Ayckbourn, Andrew Lloyd Webber)
3. "What Makes Me Love Him?" (Sheldon Harnick, Jerrold Bock)
4. "English Girls" (Don Black, Andrew Lloyd Webber)
