= Angel (Sarah Brightman song) =

Single by Sarah Brightman

from the album Dreamchaser
- Released: 15 October 2012 (European Union) (Mexico); 24 October 2012 (Japan)
- Recorded: 2012
- Genre: Classical Crossover
- Length: 5:10 (Album Version); 4:16 (Radio Edit) (United States) (Canada)
- Songwriters: Jerry Burns, Sally Herbert
- Producers: Mike Hedges; Sally Herbert

Sarah Brightman singles chronology
"Pasión" (2008)	"Angel" (2012)	"One Day Like This" (2012)

Angel is a song written by Jerry Burns and Sally Herbert sung by English singer-songwriter Sarah Brightman from her eleventh studio album, Dreamchaser. It was first released as the album's lead single in Europe and Mexico as a digital download on October 15, 2012. The song was originally sung by Sally Herbert in 2001 and was included in the soundtrack to the film Crush, starring Andie MacDowell.

== Music video ==
A music video to accompany the release of "Angel" was first released onto YouTube on October 10, 2012 at a total length of four minutes and thirty-one seconds. It was made available for download on October 30, 2012.

The music video consists of Brightman's childhood home videos, some clips from the old cartoons and new scenes as well.

== Track listing ==
Digital download - Worldwide (except United States and Canada)
No.	Title	Length
1.	"Angel" (Album Version)	5:10

Digital download - United States and Canada only
No.	Title	Length
1.	"Angel" (Radio Edit)	4:16

== Release history ==
Region	Date	Format
Europe, Mexico	15 October	Digital download
United States, Canada	16 October 2012	Digital download
Japan	24 October 2012	Digital download
