= Love Changes Everything (song) =

Single by Michael Ball

from the album Aspects of Love
- Released: 1989
- Genre: Pop, musical theatre
- Label: Polydor
- Songwriters: Andrew Lloyd Webber, Don Black, Charles Hart
- Producer: Andrew Lloyd Webber

Michael Ball singles chronology
"Love Changes Everything" (1989)	"The First Man You Remember" (1989)

"Love Changes Everything" is a song from the musical Aspects of Love, composed by Andrew Lloyd Webber, with a lyric written by Charles Hart and Don Black. It was first sung in the musical by the character Alex Dillingham, which was originated by Michael Ball in both the London and Broadway casts. The song was released as a single in 1989, also sung by Ball, and stayed on the UK Singles Chart for 15 weeks, peaking at No. 2 and becoming Ball's signature tune. The song was later featured on Ball's 1992 self-titled debut album and Love Changes Everything: The Collection.

== Background ==
In the prologue to Aspects of Love, a young Englishman, Alex, is lovestruck by a French actress, Rose. This upends his world, and he sings that "Love changes everything ... How you live and / How you die" for better or for worse. He notes that love "Makes fools of everyone" and concludes that, once love strikes, "Nothing in the / World will ever / Be the same." Musically, it is a "simple, effective three-chord piano-accompanied anthem". The song became the best-known number from Aspects of Love and it "delivered yet more proof that Andrew Lloyd Webber could deliver soaring, anthemic ballads".

The song was featured at the 44th Tony Awards.

The 2018 compilation album, Andrew Lloyd Webber Unmasked: The Platinum Collection, included a remixed version of the 1989 single recording.

== Other versions ==
Artists who have covered it include

- Jonathan Antoine
- John Barrowman
- Sarah Brightman
- Michael Crawford
- Il Divo (with Michael Ball)
- Paul Potts
- G4
- Honeymoon Suite
- Aaron Lines
- Audra McDonald
- Nana Mouskouri
- Opportunity Knocks winner Mark Rattray
- The Shadows on their 1990 album "Reflection"
- Sting
- Sting and Shaggy
- Television Personalities
- Anthony Warlow
- Marti Webb
- Hayley Westenra
- Harry Secombe, on his 1991 album Yours Sincerely

The Off-Broadway spoof revue Forbidden Broadway picked up on the bed-hopping aspect of Aspects of Love, changing the song to "We Sleep with Everyone".

== Certifications ==
Region	Certification	Certified units/sales
United Kingdom (BPI)	Silver	200,000^{^}
^{^} Shipments figures based on certification alone.
