= Canção do Mar =

1954 song in the fado tradition by Amália Rodrigues

"Solidão (Canção do Mar)"

Song by Amália Rodrigues

from the album The Lovers of Lisbon (Les amants du Tage)
- Released: 1955
- Genre: Fado
- Songwriters: Frederico de Brito, Ferrer Trindade

Music video
- " Solidão (Canção do Mar)" on YouTube

"Canção do Mar"

Single by Tristão da Silva
- Released: 1961
- Genre: Fado
- Songwriters: Frederico de Brito, Ferrer Trindade

Music video
- "Canção do Mar" on YouTube

"Canção do Mar"

Single by Dulce Pontes

from the album Lágrimas
- Released: 1993
- Songwriters: Frederico de Brito, Ferrer Trindade

Music video
- "Canção do Mar" on YouTube

"Canção do Mar" (in English: "Song of the Sea") is a song in the fado tradition by Portuguese singer Amália Rodrigues initially recorded with the lyrics "Solidão" (in English: "Solitude") for the soundtrack of the film "Les amants du Tage" also known by the English title The Lovers of Lisbon, and released as a single in 1954 by Columbia Records. The song was written by Frederico de Brito and Ferrer Trindade.

"Canção do Mar" follows in the history of fado, closely tied to the port district of Lisbon with lyrics incorporating poetry often related to the sea. On 27 November 2011, fado was added to the UNESCO Intangible Cultural Heritage Lists.

Tristão da Silva released a version in 1961, using the original title "Canção do Mar".

== Dulce Pontes version ==
The song was covered by Portuguese singer Dulce Pontes. Pontes´s version was featured in the 1996 movie Primal Fear, starring Richard Gere and Edward Norton; it was also used as the title music in TV series Southland. In Brazil, the same version was the theme of epic novela adaption of As Pupilas do Senhor Reitor by SBT in 1995.

Pontes first learned that her recording of "Canção do Mar" was in the film Primal Fear while in the theater, unexpectedly hearing her voice singing the song as part of the soundtrack. She was quoted in Billboard saying "At first I couldn't believe it. I thought I was dreaming. Later my record company told me the whole story, and now all I want is to say thanks to my American friends, especially Mr. Hoblit, for being so kind to me."

== Cover versions and other language versions ==
There are many language versions of "Canção do Mar" including:

- Portuguese: "Canção do Mar" by Valentina Félix
- Portuguese: "Solidão" on Je Dis Oui! (2016) by Pink Martini
- Portuguese: "Canção do Mar" by Misia
- Portuguese: "Meu Brasil, Meu Portugal" by Julio Iglesias
- Spanish: "Oye Mar" by Chayanne
- Spanish: A second version by Chenoa
- French: "Elle, tu l'aimes..." by Hélène Ségara
- German: "Das Ja zum Leben" by Milva
- Greek: "Ftes esi" by Mando
- Persian: "Bargard Be Man" by Shani Rigsbee
- English: "Harem" by Sarah Brightman.

== "Harem" ==
"Harem"

Single by Sarah Brightman

from the album Harem
- Released: November 4, 2003
- Studio: Sono Studios (Beirut, Lebanon); Rudolfinum Studios (Prague, Czech Republic)
- Label: Angel Records
- Songwriters: Frederico de Brito, Ferrer Trindade, Sarah Brightman, Frank Peterson, Roxanne Seeman
- Producer: Frank Peterson

Sarah Brightman singles chronology
"A Whiter Shade of Pale/A Question of Honour" (2001)	"Harem" (2003)	"It's a Beautiful Day" (2003)

Music video
- "Harem" on YouTube

"Harem" is a song by classical crossover artist Sarah Brightman, released on November 4, 2003 based on the music of "Canção do Mar". It was the first single taken from her 2003 album of the same name. "Harem" ranked number 1 on the Billboard dance/club charts.

In China Daily Brightman was quoted as saying "I've loved this song for ages," she said. "In our version, I wanted it to have a contemporary, Arabian Nights feel - love, the desert, passion and fire, but also with a dance feeling."

=== Critical reception ===
In a review of Brightman's "Harem" album and "Harem World Tour", Larry Womack for the Oroville Mercury-Register declared "she fuses the modern with the classical into a single piece" and "truly shines" clarifying "The title song (and opening number), augments de Brito and Trindade's melody 'Cancao do Mar' with a dance arrangement by Frank Peterson, as well as English lyrics by Brightman and Roxanne Seeman" and calling it "the artist's most inspired show opening to date. Karl Low for The Voice Magazine opined "A fan of dance or world music will appreciate this track as it skillfully blends both the middle-eastern sounds and modern dance, with Sarah's operatic vocals providing a great counterpoint." Steve Morse for the Boston Globe wrote: "Bedecked in a regal belly dancing costume with a thin, billowing fabric around her shoulders, Brightman started her two-set show with the title track "Harem"... backed by a 20-piece orchestra..."

=== Track listing ===
1. "Harem (Canção Do Mar)" (Hex Hector Vocal Mix) – 10:02
2. "Harem (Canção Do Mar)" (Robbie Rivera Vocal Mix) – 6:32
3. "Harem (Canção Do Mar)" (Manny Lehman Vocal Mix) – 11:05
4. "It's a Beautiful Day" (Groove Brothers Remix) – 3:28

== See also ==
- List of number-one dance hits (United States)
- List of artists who reached number one on the U.S. Dance chart
