= Harem (album) =

2003 studio album by Sarah Brightman

Studio album by Sarah Brightman
- Released: 19 March 2003
- Studio: Nemo Studios (Hamburg, Germany); Sono Studios (Beirut, Lebanon); Rudolfinum Studio (Prague, Czech Republic); Art Studio (Cairo, Egypt); Angel Recording Studios (London, England); Abbey Road Studios (London, England); Studios Versailles (Paris, France); Proloton Studio (Hamburg, Germany); Copthorne Studio (Maidenhead, England); Maison de Musique (Toronto, ON)
- Genre: Classical crossover; Middle Eastern music; Arabic pop; Ethnic fusion; Eurodisco; Baroque pop
- Length: 59:25
- Label: Angel
- Producer: Frank Peterson

Sarah Brightman chronology
Encore (2002)	Harem (2003)	The Harem Tour (2003)

Singles from Harem
- 1. "Harem" Released: 2003 (USA); 2. "It's a Beautiful Day" Released: 2003; 3. "What You Never Know" Released: 17 June 2003 (Canada); 4. "Free" Released: 21 June 2004

Harem is the eighth studio album by English singer Sarah Brightman, released in the United States on 10 June 2003 through Angel Records. The album continued the collaboration between Brightman and her longtime producer Frank Peterson.

Although it has an inclination towards her signature operatic performance, the album encompasses dance-oriented and uptempo styles in keeping with a celebratory motif. In contrast to the classical crossover music style that framed her previous releases, Harem showcases a wider range of genres, exploring World music-related styles, such as Arabic and Indian music.

Harem received generally positive reviews. The Arabian-flavoured album was commercially well received in certain territories. It became Brightman's first top 10 album ever in Japan and debuted in Canada at No. 7. It topped the US Top Classical Albums chart for seven consecutive weeks. With Harem, Brightman became the only artist ever to have simultaneously held the number 1 spot in Billboard's Classical and Dance charts.

Following the release of Harem, Brightman launched the Harem World Tour, followed by the Harem: a Desert Fantasy and The Harem World Tour: Live from Las Vegas DVDs.

== Background ==
About the album, Brightman said: "I wanted to record an album with a Middle Eastern feel. It just felt like the right way to go, just a feeling at first, which is how I begin all my albums". "I have always loved that whole Arabian Nights feeling. Much of what we have created derives from my childhood reading. I was a C.S. Lewis fan. I like the idea of parallel worlds, faraway lands, mystery – I've traveled a huge amount over the years, which has influenced me immensely".

Harem was produced by Brightman's longtime collaborator/producer Frank Peterson. Jaz Coleman (Killing Joke) created the orchestrations in sumptuous layers of instrumental sound both Eastern and Western. The album features orchestral musicians from as far apart as Prague and Cairo, as well as instrumentalists from all over the world. Also joining Brightman are acclaimed classical violin Nigel Kennedy and singer Kadim Al Sahir, as well as Natacha Atlas, Ofra Haza and Shweta Shetty.

=== Titling ===
Brightman's first taste of desert life came when she was a little girl, a dancer at the Elmhurst Ballet School. Her parents took her to Northern Africa on holiday. "I believe it was Tunisia", Brightman remembered, "I also traveled to Marrakech when I was younger. I've always liked the idea of the outsider in these areas. It's why I like Paul Bowles. It's also why I called the album Harem. It means forbidden place if you translate it. It's in your imagination, but you don't really go there. You maybe don't want to go there, but it's a mystical place. It's ancient. People have journeyed there and come back changed".

== Composition ==
=== Structure and style ===
Sarah Brightman's official website describes the album as "heady and intoxicating" and "without doubt, the most expansive and cinematic of Sarah's albums yet". Brightman and producer Frank Peterson combined their contemporary and dance-oriented sensibilities with the exotic instrumentation and melodic phrases of bygone eras. Harem is part of Brightman's continued experimentation with concept albums. It explores World music-related styles, such as Arabic and Indian music. According to Jerry McCulley of Amazon, "Brightman steps into that pan-cultural hall of mirrors here, wedding her fascination with the music and rhythms of the 'forbidden places' (the title's Arabic meaning) of the Middle East to her own oft ethereal vocal charms and rock-solid sense of drama". Jason Shawhan of Artist Direct said "the entire record is built around a Middle Eastern theme, and many instruments native to that region flow through the mix of baroque pop, crunch-opera, eurodisco, and passionate balladry". The editorial review of Barnes & Noble states that "the disc dips into worldbeat territory while showcasing the multi-million-selling artist's haunting voice".

=== Songs and lyrics ===
The title track of Harem is an adaptation of "Canção do Mar," a classic from Portugal's fado tradition. Roxanne Seeman, Sarah Brightman and producer Frank Peterson wrote new lyrics for the melody, in which the singer hears a connection between Middle Eastern sounds and the ancient inspirations of fado. Brightman said, "I've loved this song for ages. In our version, I wanted it to have a contemporary, Arabian Nights feel – love, the desert, passion and fire but also with a dance feeling." The singer's imagination drove a new sound for some classic hits – ranging from "What a Wonderful World" and "Stranger in Paradise" – both bathed in the Eastern atmosphere that has inspired her. "Stranger in Paradise" circles back to Borodin's voluptuous Polovetsian Dances for its rich orchestral textures, cradling Brightman's crystalline singing. "What a Wonderful World" is an audacious reinvention of a well-traveled pop feel-good anthem – edgier this time, tinged with melancholy. "It's a Beautiful Day" features the singer's operatic voice; in this song Puccini's "Un Bel di" is artfully coalesced with driving synthesizer beats and Middle Eastern refrains. "The melody has this feeling of space, of mystery, of times gone by", Brightman said.

"What You Never Know" is the album's first Canadian single and the work of songwriter Stephan Moccio who wrote "A New Day Has Come", the title song for Céline Dion's album. Brightman said that her first meeting with him sparked the collaboration. "It was wonderful", she said. "He even knew the key I sound best in. He understood about simplicity, and I told him, 'I don't want you to have barriers – write something for me that you really feel.' This song has that 'inside' feeling. I heard it immediately". "The Journey Home" comes from Indian film composer A. R. Rahman's hit West End Bollywood musical Bombay Dreams, produced in London by Andrew Lloyd Webber. It was Lloyd Webber who brought the song to Brightman's attention. "I've been in love with Indian films, and I've known Rahman's music for a long time. When I heard the song I really, really liked it. It has a different interpretation here than in the musical, but it has the right feel". "Free" lends Harem the French connection Brightman wanted it to have. The song was actually written in German, about the cathartic end of a love affair. The lyrics were, to Brightman "amazing, but it was very difficult to make them fit in English". A French translation of the English version helped solve the problem, and the gentle commentary of Kennedy's violin gives the track an even greater intensity. The lyrics of "Mysterious Days" lend Harem a hipper, more modern sensibility in its evocation of American expatriates in Marrakech – Paul Bowles, in particular, and The Sheltering Sky. "It talks about the Casbah, working in the attic, the mix of the city and the Americans working there, and it has a dance aspect to it as well", Brightman said. "The War Is Over" embraced an end to the conflicts in love – eloquently brings Sarah Brightman together with the Iraqi singer Kadim Al Sahir, as well as the classical violin virtuoso Kennedy. "We asked Kadim to do this song with me because we knew of his voice", Brightman said.

Brightman takes on an active writing role in this album and is credited with writing or co-writing the lyrics and/or music to Harem, "It's A Beautiful Day", "Free", "The War Is Over Now" and "You Take My Breath Away".

== Release ==
Harem was physically released in Japan on 19 March 2003. The album was digitally released worldwide by Angel Records on 28 April 2003.

== Singles ==
"Harem" was released as the album's lead single. The original version was "Canção do Mar", a song first performed by Fado singer Amália Rodrigues in 1955 and later popularised by Dulce Pontes. The Remixes EP was released on 4 November 2003. It reached no. 1 on the US Billboard Dance/Club Play Songs chart. "It's a Beautiful Day", the album's second international single, features an excerpt of "Un bel dì vedremo", from Puccini's opera Madama Butterfly. "What You Never Know" was released as the first single in Canada. The release (17 June 2003) included the French version "Tout ce que je sais". The fourth and final overall single was "Free". It was released on 21 June 2004. It ranked No. 3 on the US Billboard Dance/Club Play Songs chart. "What A Wonderful World/Strangers in Paradise" was released as a double A-side single in East Asia.

== Promotion ==
Brightman began a promotional tour in support of the album, beginning on 23 April 2003 on the Japanese News Station news program of TV Asahi. She performed "Beautiful", "Question of Honour" and "Sarahbande". On 2 May, Brightman went to Taiwan for a 4-day stay in Taipei. During the promotional tour in Germany (from 20 to 24 May), the singer performed "It’s a Beautiful Day" and "Time to Say Goodbye" on ARD's Hits, Hits, Hits 25 Years Superstars & Megahits special event. Brightman made an appearance at the Grand Prix Eurovision de la Chanson für Deutschland performing "It's a Beautiful Day" and "Harem". Later on, she performed "Harem" at the Goldene Henne TV show on 29 September 2003. One month later, Brightman joined Schiller on stage to perform "The Smile", a track included in the Harem Tour CD. Finland was Brightman's final stop in Europe. She performed "Harem" and "It's a Beautiful Day" at the Suomen Neito beauty contest. Promotional appearances took place in Canada at the end of May. She performed Harem at Fashion Cares event, and also appeared at the Canada AM morning show. The singer later performed at the Canadian concert series Live at the Rehearsal Hall during October. Promotion in Canada continued in January 2004 with Brightman's Arabian-themed concert on CBC's Opening Night, which included British violinist Nigel Kennedy and Iraqi singer Kadim Al Sahir as guest performers. Promotion in the United States started on 9 June. An autograph session in New York City was held and Brightman later appeared on The Sharon Osbourne Show. Brightman went to Brazil's Hebe show twice to promote the album. The first time, in 2003, she performed "Harem", and during the second visit, in 2004, she sang "What a Wonderful World". Brightman was a headlining performer at the 2004 Arabian Music Awards in Dubai, United Arab Emirates, and in August, she performed "The War Is Over" with Kadim Al Sahir at the Beiteddine Festival in Beirut, Lebanon. In Jordan, Brightman made a live guest appearance at the International Souk Ukaz cultural festival to sing her duet with Kadim Al Sahir.

Harem – The Sarah Brightman Special was used as a promotional tool. It premiered at the New York Film Festival where later won the first prize for Best Musical Documentary and was later broadcast in the United States through PBS and in several other countries: Croatia (HRT), Turkey (CNBC-e), Finland (MTV3), Singapore (Arts Central TV), Canada (CBC). It was later released on DVD as Harem – a Desert Fantasy.

=== Tour ===
Beginning on 10 January 2004 and ending on 23 December 2004, the album's world tour spanned 119 stops, with sixty-eight in North America, twenty-four in Asia, twenty in Europe and five in Oceania. The Harem World Tour grossed $60 million and sold 800,000 tickets in total, $15 million and 225,000 sales of which came from the North American leg.

== Critical reception ==
Professional ratings
Review scores
Source	Rating
AllMusic	3/5 stars
Artist Direct	4.5/5 stars

Jason Shawhan of Artist Direct gave the album 4 1/2 stars out of 5, saying that "Brightman and producer/long time collaborator Frank Peterson have outdone themselves with this effort, it's a beautiful piece of work worth the listening". Aaron Latham of AllMusic gave the album 3 stars out of 5, writing that while "adopting a Middle Eastern flavor to enhance her blend of classical and new age pop, Sarah Brightman's Harem continues her experimentation with thematic discs that began with 1993's oceanic Dive. Brightman's Harem adventure is interesting enough to have listeners packed and ready to travel with her on another musical journey".

=== Awards ===
At the 2004 Arabian Music Awards, Sarah Brightman received the award for Best International Female Artist. Also, her song "The War Is Over" with Iraqui singer Kadim Al Sahir won the award for the Best Collaboration.

== Chart performance ==
Harem became Brightman's first top 10 album ever in Japan selling 17,952 copies at its peak position of No. 4. It was certified Gold there after selling over 100,000 copies. In Canada, the album debuted at the top 10. It entered the chart at No. 7 selling 6,300 copies in the first week. It remained inside the top 10 in the following week landing at #8. It later achieved Gold status for shipments of over 50,000 copies. The album reached the no. 1 spot on Turkey's D&R international sales chart. It topped the Billboard Top Classical Albums chart for seven consecutive weeks and it spent 105 weeks on the chart. In the United States, the album underperformed expectations, with sales tracked by Nielsen SoundScan figuring at approximately 333,000, or about one-third the total sales of Brightman's previous studio album, La Luna.

== Track listing ==
- All the songs were produced by Frank Peterson.

No.	Title	Writer(s)	Length
1.	"Harem"	Sarah Brightman, Frederico de Brito, Frank Peterson, Roxanne Seeman, Ferrer Trindade	5:45
2.	"What a Wonderful World"	Bob Thiele, George David Weiss	3:40
3.	"It's a Beautiful Day"	Brightman, Giacomo Puccini, Christopher von Deylen, Peterson	3:56
4.	"What You Never Know"	Stephan Moccio	3:24
5.	"The Journey Home"	Don Black, A. R. Rahman	4:56
6.	"Free"	Brightman, Sophie B. Hawkins, Matthias Meissner, Thomas Schwartz	3:45
7.	"Mysterious Days" (feat. Ofra Haza)	Bezalel Aloni, Ofra Haza, Lukas Hilbert, Klaus Hirschburger, Peterson	5:17
8.	"The War Is Over" (feat. Kadim Al Sahir and Nigel Kennedy)	Patrick Benzer, Kristian Draude, Brightman, Peterson	5:15
9.	"Misere Mei"	Gregorio Allegri, Peterson	0:54
10.	"Beautiful"	Nicola Hitchcock, Saul Freeman (Mandalay)	4:35
11.	"Arabian Nights: Scimitar Moon / Voyage / Promise / Hamesha / Alone" (feat. Natacha Atlas)	Brightman, Draude, Peterson, Brian Johnson, Carsten Heussenmann, Shweta Shetty	8:50
12.	"Stranger in Paradise"	Alexander Borodin, George Forrest, Robert Wright	4:27
13.	"Until the End of Time"	Brightman, Lukas Hilbert, Peterson	4:32
Total length:			59:25

USA Edition
No.	Title	Writer(s)	Length
14.	"You Take My Breath Away"	Brightman, Peterson	6:50
Total length:			66:14

International Edition
No.	Title	Length
14.	"Guéri De Toi" (French version of "Free")	3:49
Total length:		63:14

Canadian Edition
No.	Title	Length
14.	"Tout Ce Que Je Sais" (French version of "What You Never Know")	3:29
15.	"Guéri De Toi" (French version of "Free")	3:49
Total length:		66:44

Japanese Edition
No.	Title	Length
14.	"Sarahbande"	3:50
Total length:		63:15

Japanese Ultimate Edition (2004)
No.	Title	Length
14.	"Sarahbande"	3:50
15.	"Namida (When Firebirds Cry)"	4:10
Total length:		67:26

== Charts, sales and certifications ==
=== Weekly charts ===
Weekly chart performance for Harem
Chart (2003)	Peak position
Australian Albums (ARIA)	16
Austrian Albums (Ö3 Austria)	22
Canadian Albums (Billboard)	7
Danish Albums (Hitlisten)	35
Dutch Albums (Album Top 100)	27
European Albums (Top 100)	34
Finnish Albums (Suomen virallinen lista)	25
German Albums (Offizielle Top 100)	12
Greek Albums (IFPI)	3
Hungarian Albums (MAHASZ)	20
Italian Albums (FIMI)	73
Japanese Albums (Oricon)	8
New Zealand Albums (RMNZ)	29
Norwegian Albums (VG-lista)	36
Portuguese Albums (AFP)	12
Swedish Albums (Sverigetopplistan)	17
Swiss Albums (Schweizer Hitparade)	53
Taiwanese Albums (G-Music)	1
United Arab Emirates Albums	1
US Billboard 200	29
US Top Classical Albums (Billboard)	1

=== Year-end charts ===
2003 year-end chart performance for Harem
Chart (2003)	Position
German Albums (Offizielle Top 100)	82

=== Sales and certifications ===
Sales and certifications for Harem
Region	Certification	Certified units/sales
Canada (Music Canada)	Gold	50,000^{^}
Germany (BVMI)	Gold	100,000^{^}
Greece (IFPI Greece)	Gold	10,000^{^}
Japan (RIAJ)	Gold	100,000^{^}
South Korea	—	30,094
United States	—	333,000
^{^} Shipments figures based on certification alone.

== Release history ==
Release dates for Harem
Region	Date	Format
Japan	19 March 2003	CD
Worldwide	28 April 2003	Digital download
Germany	6 June 2003	CD
Brazil, Italy, Portugal, Russia, South Africa, Spain	9 June 2003	CD
Argentina, Austria, Denmark, France, Mexico, United States	10 June 2003	CD
New Zealand	16 June 2003	CD
India	19 June 2003	CD
Turkey	23 June 2003	CD
United Kingdom	29 September 2003	CD
