= A Question of Honour (song) =

1995 single by Sarah Brightman

Single by Sarah Brightman

from the album Fly
- Released: 1995
- Recorded: 1994
- Studio: Nemo Studios (Hamburg, Germany)
- Genre: Classical Crossover
- Label: East West Records
- Songwriter: Frank Peterson
- Producers: Frank Peterson; Alex Christensen

Sarah Brightman singles chronology
"The Second Element" (1993)	"A Question of Honour" (1995)	"How Can Heaven Love Me" (1995)

"A Question of Honour" is a 1995 single by soprano Sarah Brightman, from her album Fly. It peaked at No. 15 on the German Singles Chart in the last week of 1995, even though it was released over five months earlier. "A Question of Honour" was also the official song of the championship boxing match between Henry Maske and Graciano Rocchigiani in Germany. In Japan, TV Asahi adopted the song as the theme music of FIFA World Cup broadcasting since 2002 and plays it in related television programs. Also in Brazil, BandSports adopted the song as the theme music of FIFA World Cup broadcasting since 2022 and plays it in related television programs. The Sisters of Mercy front man, Andrew Eldritch provides backing vocals in the song.

"A Question of Honour" features an excerpt of Alfredo Catalani's aria "Ebben? Ne andrò lontana" from La Wally, a piece which Brightman later recorded in full for her album Time to Say Goodbye. The extended mix of the song, released on the standard CD single and Harem Tour album, was mastered differently from the album version and features additional instrumentation. B-side "On the Nile", a rendition of "My Own Home" from Disney's The Jungle Book with original lyrics by Brightman, was later made available on the limited edition Fly II. The "A Whiter Shade of Pale" US single featured all of the "A Question of Honour" remixes from the remix CD.

In 2011 the song was certified by the Recording Industry Association of Japan as a Gold single for more than 100,000 digital downloads.

== Track listing ==
=== CD single ===
1. "A Question of Honour" (radio edit)
2. "A Question of Honour" (extended mix)
3. "On the Nile"

== Charts ==
Chart (1995-1996)	Peak position
Germany (GfK)	15
Israel (Israeli Singles Chart)	12

=== Remix CD ===
"A Question of Honour"
Sample of A Question of Honour.

1. "A Question of Honour" (radio edit)
2. "A Question of Honour" (PeCh remix)
3. "A Question of Honour" (Knock Out remix)
4. "A Question of Honour" (Damage Control mix)
5. "A Question of Honour" (Tom Lord-Alge mix)

== A Whiter Shade of Pale/A Question of Honour ==
"A Whiter Shade of Pale"

Single by Sarah Brightman

from the album La Luna
- Released: 2001
- Studio: Centro Arteria (Milan, Italy)
- Genre: Classical Crossover
- Label: Angel Records
- Songwriter: Frank Peterson
- Producer: Frank Peterson

Sarah Brightman singles chronology
"Scarborough Fair" (2000)	"A Whiter Shade of Pale" (2001)	"Harem" (2003)

Sarah Brightman released her cover of the Procol Harum song "A Whiter Shade of Pale" as a single with "A Question of Honour" in 2001. "A Whiter Shade of Pale" is from her 2000 album La Luna.

=== Track listing ===
1. "A Whiter Shade of Pale" (Radio edit)
2. "A Whiter Shade of Pale" (ATB remix)
3. "A Whiter Shade of Pale" (Delerium remix)
4. "A Whiter Shade of Pale" (Paralyzer remix)
5. "A Whiter Shade of Pale" (ATB radio edit)
6. "A Question of Honour" (Radio edit)
7. "A Question of Honour" (Pech remix)
8. "A Question of Honour" (Knock out mix)
9. "A Question of Honour" (Damage control mix)
10. "A Question of Honour" (Tom Lord-Alge mix)

== Charts ==
2001 chart performance for "A Question of Honour"
Chart (2001)	Peak position
Canada (Jam! Canoe)	6
Japan (Oricon)	38

2022 chart performance for "A Question of Honour"
Chart (2022)	Peak position
Japan Hot Overseas (Billboard Japan)	18

== Certifications ==
Certifications for A Question of Honour
Region	Certification	Certified units/sales
Japan (RIAJ) Full-length ringtone	Gold	100,000^{*}
^{*} Sales figures based on certification alone.
