= Amigos Para Siempre =

1992 song by José Carreras and Sarah Brightman

Single by José Carreras and Sarah Brightman
- Released: 29 June 1992
- Recorded: 1992
- Studio: EMI Abbey Road, Olympic Sound (London, England)
- Genre: Pop
- Length: 4:36
- Label: Polydor; Really Useful
- Composer: Andrew Lloyd Webber
- Lyricist: Don Black
- Producers: Andrew Lloyd Webber; Nigel Wright

Sarah Brightman singles chronology
"Something to Believe In" (1990)	"Amigos Para Siempre" (1992)	"Captain Nemo" (1993)

Music video
- "Amigos Para Siempre" on YouTube

Official performance video
- "Amigos Para Siempre" on YouTube

"Amigos Para Siempre (Friends for Life)", also called "Amics per sempre" in Catalan, is a song recorded by British soprano Sarah Brightman and Spanish tenor José Carreras, with music composed by Andrew Lloyd Webber and lyrics written by Don Black. Released in June 1992, by Polydor and Really Useful, it was one of the two official theme songs of the 1992 Summer Olympics held in Barcelona, Spain. "Amigos Para Siempre" peaked at number one in Australia and was a top-10 hit also in the Netherlands, Norway and Portugal. In the UK, it reached number 11 on the UK Singles Chart.

== Background ==
The music of "Amigos Para Siempre (Friends for Life)" was composed by Andrew Lloyd Webber. The lyrics, written by Don Black, are in English, except for the title phrase which is repeated in English, Spanish, and Catalan. It was recorded by British soprano Sarah Brightman and Spanish tenor José Carreras. They also recorded its Spanish version with lyrics written by Black along with Gloria Estefan. The song was one of the two official theme songs of the 1992 Summer Olympics held in Barcelona, Spain, with the other being "Barcelona" recorded by Freddie Mercury and Montserrat Caballé.

A choir performed the song in English, Spanish, and Catalan during the opening ceremony of the Games while an Olympic flag was unfolded over the athletes who occupied the entire stadium field. Brightman and Carreras performed the song in English during the closing ceremony. The duet was also released worldwide as a single to coincide with the Games, peaking at number 11 on the UK singles chart and reaching number one in Australia for six weeks. "Barcelona" reached number two in the UK. Both songs appear on the compilation album Barcelona Gold, released to coincide with the Games.

A remixed version of the original, with less vocal reverb and modified balancing, was included on the compilation album Andrew Lloyd Webber: Now & Forever (2001).

== Critical reception ==
Larry Flick from Billboard magazine described the song as a "Spanish-pop ballad" and noted its "stately performances" by Carreras and Brightman, and the "dramatic orchestral arrangement". He also added that the Spanish-language version has lyrics co-penned by Cuban-American singer and songwriter Gloria Estefan.

== Track listing ==
1. "Amigos Para Siempre"
2. Live Opening Ceremony Barcelona Olympic 1992 Games
3. "Amigos Para Siempre" (Spanish version)
4. "Amigos Para Siempre" (Seat Anuncio 60 aniversario) – Marujita

== Charts ==
=== Weekly charts ===
Chart (1992)	Peak position
Australia (ARIA)	1
Belgium (Ultratop 50 Flanders)	44
Europe (Eurochart Hot 100)	33
Ireland (IRMA)	16
Netherlands (Dutch Top 40)	10
Netherlands (Single Top 100)	7
Norway (VG-lista)	10
Panama (UPI)	6
Portugal (AFP)	3
Sweden (Sverigetopplistan)	36
UK Singles (Official Charts)	11

=== Year-end charts ===
Chart (1992)	Position
Australia (ARIA)	5
UK Singles (OCC)	87

== Certifications ==
Region	Certification	Certified units/sales
Australia (ARIA)	Platinum	70,000^{^}
^{^} Shipments figures based on certification alone.

== Release history ==
Region	Date	Format(s)	Label(s)	Ref.
United Kingdom	29 June 1992	7-inch vinyl; CD; cassette	Polydor; Really Useful	
Australia	20 July 1992	CD; cassette	Polydor; Really Useful	
Japan	25 July 1992	CD	Polydor; Really Useful	

== Legacy ==
"Amigos Para Siempre" was the favourite song of Juan Antonio Samaranch, president of the International Olympic Committee from 1980 to 2001, and was played at his funeral in Barcelona in April 2010.

=== Cover versions ===
In Spain, the most famous rendition of this song was made by Spanish group Los Manolos with rumba arrangements and Spanish lyrics, except for the chorus. It reached number 3 in the Spanish charts. In September 1992, it was covered by Effie and Norman Gunston and reached the top 30 in Australia at the time.

In one of Andrew Lloyd Webber's Really Useful Group's concerts in Beijing, China, a Chinese version of this song was performed with approximately half of the lyrics in Mandarin and half in English. In this version, "Amigos Para Siempre" was replaced by "永远的朋友", which is "Friends Forever" in Chinese. A fully Cantonese version "友愛長存" (literally "eternal friendship") was sung by George Lam.

This song was also used for the Shanghai 2007 Special Olympic Games, performed again by José Carreras and a Chinese soprano.

On Sunday, 17 August 2008 at the Don Black 70th birthday tribute concert Lyrics by Don Black, Amigos Para Siempre was performed by Jonathan Ansell and Hayley Westenra. The evening took place at the London Palladium featuring performances of Black's songs by a selection of guest artists, hosted by Michael Parkinson and was recorded by Friday Night is Music Night and broadcast on BBC Radio 2 on 22 August 2008.

In 2014, Katherine Jenkins and Viennese tenor Laszlo Maleczky covered the song on the album Katherine Jenkins that was only released in Germany, Austria, and Switzerland.

In 2016, Marina Prior and Mark Vincent covered the song on their album Together.

In 2017, G4 covered the song on their latest album Love Songs.

In 2020, La Poem covered the song on their first mini-album Scene#1 and performed it at the opening of the 35th Golden Disc Awards.

In 2025, Julieta reimagined the song for her second studio album 23.
