= Hymn (album) =

Studio album by Sarah Brightman
- Released: 9 November 2018
- Recorded: 2016–2018
- Studios: Village Studios (Los Angeles), Abbey Road Studios (London), Nemo Studios (Hamburg) and Spank Studio (Florida).
- Genre: Classical crossover · pop
- Length: 48:52
- Label: Decca
- Producers: Frank Peterson; Patrick Hawes; Steve Sidwell; Paul Bateman; Tom Lord-Alge

Sarah Brightman chronology
Gala – The Collection (2016)	Hymn (2018)	France (2020)

Singles from Hymn
- 1. "Sogni" Released: 17 September 2018; 2. "Hymn" Released: 18 October 2018; 3. "Miracle" Released: 16 November 2018; 4. "Fly to Paradise" Released: 5 April 2019

Hymn is the twelfth studio album by English soprano Sarah Brightman and the first since 2013's Dreamchaser. The five-and-a-half-year gap between two studio albums marks Brightman's longest break between studio releases. This album was Brightman's ninth studio collaboration with producer Frank Peterson. The album was released on 9 November 2018, entering at No. 1 on both the Billboard Classical Crossover Albums and overall Classical Albums, making Brightman the female artist with the most No. 1s in both charts.

== Background ==
Brightman released her eleventh studio album Dreamchaser at the beginning of 2013. It marked a departure from her previous material by exploring new sounds and collaborating with producers Mike Hedges and Sally Herbert after twenty years of continuous work with Frank Peterson. The album gathered acclaim from critics, some considering it Brightman's strongest work to date. In order to promote her new material, Sarah embarked on a two-year world tour, under the name "Dreamchaser World Tour". The concert tour consisted of 106 shows in twenty-three countries, becoming Brightman's second largest of her career. In 2015, Brightman was expected to travel to the International Space Station but cancelled the trip for personal reasons.

In 2016 and 2017, Brightman embarked on two more concert tours: Gala: An Evening with Sarah Brightman, and Royal Christmas Gala alongside Gregorian and special guests. Both concert tours served as a promotion of her greatest hits album Gala - The Collection. Recording of her new album took place during these two years.

== Production and recording ==
According to Brightman's website, talks about a new album started in early 2016. Peterson began talking to Brightman about making a new album but she was unsure of doing so. Brightman, who had intended to launch on a future orbital spaceflight mission to the International Space Station, had halted her Cosmonaut training in Russia, which left her feeling vulnerable and depleted. After some time in Florida, Brightman and Peterson decided to start a new musical project, embracing an uplifting and optimistic sound.

Production for the album was officially announced on 9 December 2016. A photo of Sarah at the Nemo Studio in Hamburg, Germany was uploaded on her Facebook page with the caption "The start of something special". Additional photos were uploaded as the month continued. On 3 January 2017, Sarah's official Facebook page uploaded a photo of the singer working alongside longtime producer Frank Peterson. This event marked Brightman and Peterson's ninth studio collaboration and first since 2008's album A Winter Symphony.

Updates of the album's production continued along the year. On 23 February 2017, Peterson uploaded a photo on his Facebook page, revealing that recording sessions were taking place at Village Studios. On 9 March 2017, a photo of Sarah accompanied by the Spirit of David Choir in a studio in Los Angeles was uploaded to her website and media. Photos of the studio and recording sessions were uploaded to the internet on 5 April, 15 April, and 13 June 2017, along with minimal information. On 30 October 2017, it was announced that Brightman's last studio album recording was being continued at Abbey Road Studios along the London Symphony Orchestra. Patrick Hawes, Steve Sidwell and Paul Bateman were also mentioned as contributors to the album's production.

Brightman's studio recording had to be paused due to her participation in the co-headlining concert tour with Gregorian and other guests' Royal Christmas Gala, during the months of November and December 2017. Brightman returned to the production phase on 10 January 2018, as informed on her website. A few days later, it was informed that Tom Lord-Alge was contributing in the recording phase of the studio album, and was being recorded at Spank Studio, in South Beach, Florida. The recording process took place in a total of seven cities: Hamburg, Miami, London, Vancouver, Los Angeles, New York and Budapest.

On 20 June, it was announced that the album photo shoot had taken place at the Priory Church of St. Bartholomew the Great in London. On 3 July 2018, Sarah announced via Twitter that the recording phase had finished.

== Music and lyrics ==
There's a lot of confusion, and people sometimes don't know where to go. I wanted to sing something very familiar, something close, something that could be religious or spiritual. Those are things that make me feel centered.

— Brightman speaking about her inspiration for the album during an interview with Billboard.

During a telephone interview with Brazilian journal Destak, Brightman said the album's sound would have similarities with her first solo material, Timeless (1997) and Eden (1998), thus indicating a classical and operatic approach. In the same interview Brightman said that the concept of the album centered around achieving a sense of security and optimism in the middle of a dystopian world. These themes were inspired after Brightman's cancelled journey to the International Space Station and all its preparation.

Brightman described this album as "excitingly eclectic, encompassing many different styles" during a press interview. "Every project I’ve done has come from an emotional place, and I wanted to make something that sounded very beautiful and uplifting. To me, ‘Hymn,’ suggests joy — a feeling of hope and light, something that is familiar and secure, and I hope that sentiment resonates through the music."

Some songs of the album consist of covers of varied pieces from different decades. The title track belongs to British prog-rock band Barclay James Harvest. The release also encompasses songs by such modern composers as Eric Whitacre ("Fly To Paradise"), Japanese musician and songwriter Yoshiki ("Miracle"), and German DJ Paul Kalkbrenner ("Sky and Sand"). The album closes with a new rendition of Brightman's signature duet with Andrea Bocelli, "Time To Say Goodbye," singing lyrics that she wrote herself, and sung in English for the first time.

== Singles ==
"Sogni" was released as the first single from the album as a collaboration between Brightman and French tenor Vincent Niclo. Composer and producer Frank Peterson described the operatic song as "a mash-up" of two arias from two different operas by French composer Georges Bizet. The track was released worldwide on 17 September as a digital download and was made available for streaming as well.

On 18 October, the title track of the album was released as the second official single. The song had an exclusive premiere on Parade Magazine and it was released to streaming services the following day. The single is a cover of Barclay James Harvest's hit and a part of their successful album, Gone to Earth. According to The Telegraph, the song was first given to Brightman as part of a mixtape by Peterson. This was during the 1980s, before both artists started working together. The mixtape worked as an introduction of Peterson's work to Sarah.

== Release ==
On 17 May 2017, Sarah re-launched a community forum for fans after several years of absence, in which the album's title was announced, along the caption "Fall 2018", stating a possible release date. The forum also works as a source of exclusive content, album news and behind-the-scenes, specially for their members. On 20 August 2018, the Brazilian journal Gazeta do Povo published an interview of Brightman, where it stated that the album would be released in the month of October. Nevertheless, it was later confirmed that the album release would be on 9 November 2018 in CD and digital download format, as well as on vinyl. On 17 September, the album cover and its tracklist was announced along with the re-launch of the webpage.

== Promotion ==
The promotion campaign of the album started on 26 September in New York City, where Brightman made an interview with Build series. Additional interviews were made with ABC action news and actress Bonnie Laufer Krebs.

=== World tour ===
On 6 August 2018, Brightman announced her return to the South American continent after five years, along with her promotional tour Hymn: Sarah Brightman In Concert. The concert tour includes dates in Brazil, Chile and Argentina in the months of November and December. A second date had to be added in Buenos Aires due to overwhelming demand. On 17 September, along the official announcement of the release date of the album, the North American tour dates of the tour were announced as well. On 12 November, with the official release of "Miracle", it was announced on her official Instagram that the tour would include Japan in April 2019.

=== TV and cinema event ===
On 10 September, Brightman announced via Facebook that a special show would take place at Bavaria, Germany and be filmed as well. The concert took place on 21 September at the Musiktheater Füssen and included special guests such as Mario Frangoulis, Vincent Niclo, Narcis and Yoshiki. The filmed concert was screened in cinemas on 8 November, a day before the album release. The 90-minute film concert was shown in more than 450 cinemas in the United States for that single date. It will also air on PBS at a date TBD.

== Track listing ==
Standard edition
No.	Title	Writer(s)	Length
1.	"Hymn Overture (Note: "Hymn Overture" is omitted from vinyl pressings of the album.)"	Frank Peterson; Rene Laack	1:02
2.	"Hymn"	John Lees	4:27
3.	"Sogni" (featuring Vincent Niclo)	Peterson; Chiara Ferrau	4:18
4.	"Sky and Sand"	Paul Kalkbrenner; Fritz Kalkbrenner	4:12
5.	"Canto per noi"	Ennio Morricone; Romano Musumarra	3:21
6.	"Fly to Paradise" (featuring Eric Whitacre Singers)	Eric Whitacre; Peterson; Basti Inselmann	5:13
7.	"Gia nel seno (La storia di Lucrezia)"	Juliette Pochin; James Morgan	3:09
8.	"Follow Me"	Bronislau Kaper; Paul Francis Webster	3:59
9.	"You"	David Zippel; Patrick Hawes	3:30
10.	"Better Is One Day"	Matt Redman	3:51
11.	"Tu che m'hai preso il cuor"	Franz Lehar; Bedřich Löwy; Ludwig Herzer	2:43
12.	"Miracle" (featuring Yoshiki)	Yoshiki	4:52
13.	"Time to Say Goodbye" (2018 version)	Francesco Sartori; Lucio Quarantotto	4:15
Total length:			48:52

Japanese edition and iTunes bonus tracks
No.	Title	Writer(s)	Length
14.	"Done" (pop version)	Judith Berard; Peterson	3:41
15.	"Sky and Sand" (Pedi remix)	P. Kalkbrenner; F. Kalkbrenner	3:48
Total length:			56:21

Target exclusive edition bonus tracks
No.	Title	Writer(s)	Length
14.	"Watermark"	Enya	2:30
15.	"Sleep Tight"	Sarah Brightman	3:37
Total length:			54:59

World Tour Limited Edition bonus track
No.	Title	Writer(s)	Length
14.	"Vide Cor Meum"	Patrick Cassidy	4:26
Total length:			53:18

== Charts ==
Chart (2018)	Peak position
Australian Classical Crossover Albums (ARIA)	7
Belgian Albums (Ultratop Flanders)	119
Belgian Albums (Ultratop Wallonia)	145
Canadian Albums (Billboard)	29
German Albums (Offizielle Top 100)	61
Japan Hot Albums (Billboard Japan)	43
Japanese Albums (Oricon)	23
Scottish Albums (Official Charts)	87
South Korean Albums (Gaon)	99
South Korean International Albums (Circle)	7
Spanish Albums (PROMUSICAE)	60
Swiss Albums (Schweizer Hitparade)	36
US Billboard 200	50
US Top Album Sales (Billboard)	11
US Top Classical Albums (Billboard)	1
