= Hymn: Sarah Brightman In Concert =

2018–21 concert tour by Sarah Brightman

Hymn: Sarah Brightman in concert
- Tour by Sarah Brightman
- Location: Asia; Europe; North America; South America
- Associated album: Hymn
- Start date: 24 November 2018
- End date: 11 November 2019
- Legs: 5
- No. of shows: 66

Sarah Brightman concert chronology
- Royal Christmas Gala (2017); Hymn: Sarah Brightman In Concert (2018–19); A Christmas Symphony (2021–2022)

Hymn: Sarah Brightman In Concert was the sixth worldwide concert tour, and tenth tour altogether, by English soprano singer Sarah Brightman in support of her album Hymn (2018). The tour began on 24 November 2018, in São Paulo, Brazil, and concluded on 11 November 2019, in London, England.

== Background ==
On 6 August 2018, Brightman announced her return to the South American continent after five years with her promotional tour Hymn: Sarah Brightman In Concert. The concert tour included dates in Brazil, Chile, and Argentina in the months of November and December. A second date was added in Buenos Aires due to overwhelming demand. On 13 September, it was announced that Brightman's show in Santiago would be cancelled due to programming and logistical issues.

On 17 September, along with the official announcement of the album Hymn, the North American leg of the tour was announced, along with extra dates in Latin America. It was revealed that the tour would consist of 125 shows across five continents, thus becoming the largest tour of Brightman's career.

In promotion of her world tour, Brightman partnered with Swarovski to create the elaborate costumes and tiaras for the show's wardrobe.

On 21 January, Brightman announced on her official Instagram account that she would bring the tour to the United Kingdom with an official date at the Royal Albert Hall in London on 11 November, her first performance in London since the Harem World Tour in 2004.

== Production ==
In an interview with Billboard, Brightman revealed that the show would be a larger production than the Dreamchaser World Tour, including a choir and live orchestra.

== Set list ==
Act 1

1. "Gothica"
2. "Fleurs Du Mal"
3. "Stranger in Paradise"
4. "Carpe Diem" (featuring Mario Frangoulis in 2018 / Vincent Niclo 2019)
5. "Sometimes I Dream" (Mario Frangoulis solo in 2018)
6. "Ameno" (Vincent Niclo solo in 2019)
7. "Anytime, Anywhere"
8. "Gia nel seno"
9. "Hijo de la Luna"
10. "Follow Me"
11. "Misere mei"
12. "Figlio perduto"
13. "Who Wants to Live Forever"
14. "Tu che m'hai preso il cuor"
15. "La Wally" (Not Sung in 2018)
16. "Miracle" (featuring Yoshiki)

Act 2

17. Hymn Overture
18. "Hymn"
19. "Sogni" (featuring Mario Frangoulis in 2018 / Vincent Niclo 2019)
20. "Better Is One Day"
21. "Canto Per Noi"
22. "Pie Jesu" (Featuring Narcis)
23. "Caruso" (Narcis solo)
24. "Fly to Paradise"
25. "Time to Say Goodbye"
26. "Masquerade Overture"
27. "The Phantom of the Opera" (featuring Mario Frangoulis in 2018 / Vincent Niclo 2019)
28. "Running"

Encore

29. "Deliver Me"
30. "Ave Maria"
31. "Sky and Sand" (2018 only)
32. "A Question of Honour"

== TV and cinema event ==
On 10 September, Brightman announced via Facebook that a special show would be performed and filmed in Bavaria, Germany. The concert took place on 21 September at the Musiktheater Füssen and included special guests such as Mario Frangoulis, Vincent Niclo, Narcis, and Yoshiki. The filmed concert was released in cinemas through fathom Events for a special one-night showing on 8 November, a day before the album's release.

The 90-minute TV and cinema event featured a slightly different set list and more elaborate staging than the live tour.

An abridged version of the concert was broadcast on PBS stations in the US from November 2018-January 2019. On 5 December, the edited version was released on DVD as both a pledge gift and for purchase through the official PBS online shop.

== Cinema Event Set List ==
ACT I

1. Gothica
2. Fleurs Du Mal
3. Stranger In Paradise
4. Carpe Diem (featuring Mario Frangoulis)
5. Anytime, Anywhere
6. Gia Nel Seno
7. Misere Mei (performed by orchestra and choir)
8. Beautiful
9. Follow Me
10. Figlio Perduto
11. Who Wants To Live Forever
12. Tu Che M'Hai Preso Il Cuor
13. Miracle (featuring Yoshiki)

ACT II

1. Hymn Overture
2. Hymn
3. Sogni (featuring Vincent Niclo)
4. There For Me (featuring Vincent Niclo)
5. Better Is One Day
6. Canto Per Noi
7. Pie Jesu (featuring Narcis)
8. Fly to Paradise
9. Time To Say Goodbye (2018 version)
10. Masquerade Overture (performed by orchestra and choir)
11. The Phantom of The Opera (featuring Mario Frangoulis)
12. Sky and Sand

== Tour dates ==
List of 2018 concerts
Date	City	Country	Venue	Attendance	Revenue
24 November 2018	São Paulo	Brazil	Espaço das Américas	—	—
25 November 2018	São Paulo	Brazil	Espaço das Américas	—	—
27 November 2018	Brasília	Brazil	Ulysses Guimarães Convention Center	—	—
29 November 2018	Rio de Janeiro	Brazil	Vivo Rio	—	—
1 December 2018	Curitiba	Brazil	Teatro Guaíra	—	—
4 December 2018	Lima	Peru	Gran Teatro Nacional del Perú	1,336 / 1,336	$148,475
6 December 2018	Montevideo	Uruguay	Antel Arena	1,607 / 3,000	$129,505
8 December 2018	Buenos Aires	Argentina	Teatro Colón	—	—
10 December 2018	Buenos Aires	Argentina	Teatro Colón	—	—

List of 2019 concerts
Date	City	Country	Venue	Attendance	Revenue
17 January 2019	San Juan	Puerto Rico	José Miguel Agrelot Coliseum	1,939 / 3,249	$197,931
19 January 2019	Monterrey	Mexico	Arena Monterrey	6,995 / 10,981	$180,656
22 January 2019	Zapopan	Mexico	Telmex Auditorium	5,014 / 7,973	$312,143
24 January 2019	Puebla	Mexico	Auditorio Metropolitano	3,390 / 5,394	$197,373
26 January 2019	Mexico City	Mexico	Arena Ciudad de México	8,620 / 11,972	$477,706
30 January 2019	Baltimore	United States	Hippodrome Theatre	966 / 2,182	$97,946
1 February 2019	Mashantucket	United States	MGM Grand Theater at Foxwoods	—	—
2 February 2019	Atlantic City	United States	Tropicana Showroom	—	—
3 February 2019	Philadelphia	United States	The Met Philadelphia	2,281 / 2,702	$155,900
5 February 2019	Washington, D.C.	United States	DAR Constitution Hall	1,960 / 2,929	$146,352
6 February 2019	New York City	United States	Radio City Music Hall	4,212 / 5,943	$399,109
7 February 2019	Boston	United States	Orpheum Theatre	1,891 / 2,760	$177,933
9 February 2019	Laval	Canada	Place Bell	2,141 / 2,600	$187,508
10 February 2019	Toronto	Canada	Sony Centre for the Performing Arts	2,653 / 3,191	$233,130
12 February 2019	Pittsburgh	United States	Benedum Center	1,450 / 2,870	$117,665
13 February 2019	Detroit	United States	Fox Theatre	2,229 / 3,820	$160,171
14 February 2019	Chicago	United States	Chicago Theatre	2,866 / 3,553	$250,809
16 February 2019	Greenville	United States	Bon Secours Wellness Arena	1,980 / 3,610	$149,889
17 February 2019	Atlanta	United States	Fabulous Fox Theatre	2,693 / 4,310	$255,349
19 February 2019	St. Petersburg	United States	Mahaffey Theater	1,900 / 1,993	$246,184
20 February 2019	Hollywood	United States	Hard Rock Event Center	2,541 / 2,734	$278,694
21 February 2019	Orlando	United States	Walt Disney Theater	2,336 / 2,711	$257,702
23 February 2019	Dallas	United States	Margot and Bill Winspear Opera House	2,201 / 2,268	$289,626
25 February 2019	Sugar Land	United States	Smart Financial Centre	2,917 / 3,422	$245,068
27 February 2019	Phoenix	United States	Comerica Theatre	2,507 / 3,923	$227,086
1 March 2019	San Diego	United States	Viejas Arena	3,582 / 4,913	$216,290
2 March 2019	Anaheim	United States	Honda Center	3,042 / 8,840	$309,755
3 March 2019	Las Vegas	United States	Reynolds Hall	1,901 / 2,016	$225,727
5 March 2019	Denver	United States	Paramount Theatre	1,471 / 1,947	$161,394
7 March 2019	Salt Lake City	United States	Abravanel Hall	2,027 / 2,874	$172,473
9 March 2019	San Francisco	United States	SF Masonic Auditorium	1,893 / 2,024	$212,941
10 March 2019	Los Angeles	United States	Dolby Theatre	3,232 / 3,317	$369,168
13 March 2019	San Jose	United States	City National Civic	2,310 / 2,663	$188,600
15 March 2019	Portland	United States	Keller Auditorium	1,758 / 2,430	$151,045
16 March 2019	Seattle	United States	Paramount Theatre	2,510 / 2,839	$290,100
18 March 2019	Vancouver	Canada	Queen Elizabeth Theatre	2,651 / 2,788	$214,343
15 April 2019	Nagoya	Japan	Aichi Prefectural Gymnasium	—	—
17 April 2019	Fukuoka	Japan	Fukuoka Sun Palace	—	—
19 April 2019	Hiroshima	Japan	Hiroshima Bunka Gakuen HBG Hall	—	—
22 April 2019	Osaka	Japan	Osaka-Jo Hall	—	—
23 April 2019	Yokohama	Japan	Yokohama Arena	—	—
24 April 2019	Yokohama	Japan	Yokohama Arena	—	—
26 April 2019	Morioka	Japan	Iwate Sangyo Bunka Center	—	—
20 October 2019	Sofia	Bulgaria	National Palace of Culture	—	—
21 October 2019	Bucharest	Romania	Sala Palatului	—	—
22 October 2019	Cluj-Napoca	Romania	BT Arena	—	—
25 October 2019	Odesa	Ukraine	Odesa Opera and Ballet Theater	—	—
27 October 2019	Kyiv	Ukraine	Palace of Sports	—	—
29 October 2019	Moscow	Russia	Crocus City Hall	—	—
30 October 2019	St. Petersburg	Russia	Oktyabrskiy Big Concert Hall	—	—
1 November 2019	Espoo	Finland	Espoo Metro Areena	—	—
2 November 2019	Tallinn	Estonia	Saku Suurhall	—	—
3 November 2019	Riga	Latvia	Arena Riga	—	—
4 November 2019	Kaunas	Lithuania	Žalgiris Arena	—	—
6 November 2019	Warsaw	Poland	Arena COS Torwar	—	—
8 November 2019	Prague	Czech Republic	Tipsport Arena	—	—
11 November 2019	London	England	Royal Albert Hall	—	—
Total				97,002 / 138,077 (70%)	$8,031,746

=== Cancelled/postponed shows ===
4 December 2018	Santiago	Movistar Arena	Cancelled due to logistical issues.
10 June 2020	Quezon City	Araneta Coliseum	COVID-19 pandemic
27 June 2020	Pahang	Arena of Stars	COVID-19 pandemic
30 June 2020	Taipei	Taipei Arena	COVID-19 pandemic
9 July 2020	Tel Aviv	Menora Mivtachim Arena	COVID-19 pandemic
7 October 2020	Las Vegas	Venetian Theater	COVID-19 pandemic
9 October 2020	Las Vegas	Venetian Theater	COVID-19 pandemic
10 October 2020	Las Vegas	Venetian Theater	COVID-19 pandemic
14 October 2020	Milwaukee	Riverside Theater	COVID-19 pandemic
18 October 2020	Wallingford	Toyota Oakdale Theatre	COVID-19 pandemic
