= Royal Christmas Gala =

2017 concert tour

- Tour by Sarah Brightman, Gregorian, Mario Frangoulis, Narcis Iustin Ianău, and Fernando Varela
- Location: Europe
- Associated album: Gala – Sarah Brightman The Collection
- Start date: 20 November 2017
- End date: 23 December 2017
- Legs: 1
- No. of shows: 23
Sarah Brightman tour chronology
Gala: An Evening with Sarah Brightman (2016–17)	Royal Christmas Gala (2017)	Hymn: Sarah Brightman In Concert (2018–19)

Royal Christmas Gala was a co-headlining concert tour by Sarah Brightman, Gregorian, Mario Frangoulis, Narcis Iustin Ianău, and Fernando Varela, The tour began on 20 November 2017, in Aalborg, Denmark, and concluded on 23 December that year, in Vienna, Austria, two days before Christmas. The tour consisted of a total 23 dates, including Brightman's first visit to Poland, and centered around the festive season.

== Set list ==
ACT I

1. Land of Hope and Glory (Orchestra)
2. Celebrate Christmas (Gregorian)
3. You See the Snow (Gregorian)
4. Walking in the Air (Gregorian)
5. Peace on Earth (Amelia Brightman & Gregorian)
6. Jingle Bells (Mario Frangoulis)
7. Panis angelicus (Mario Frangoulis)
8. Christmas Morning (Mario Frangoulis)
9. The Fountain (Alisa Sadikova)
10. Child in a Manger (Gregorian)
11. Mistletoad and Wine (Amelia Brightman & Gregorian)
12. Ave Maria (Romano Musimarra) (Narcis)
13. O mio babbino caro (Narcis)
14. Gloria (Fernando Varela)
15. All by Myself (Fernando Varela)
16. Nessun dorma (Fernando Varela)

ACT II

1. Dr Zhivago Lara's Theme (Orchestra)
2. Ave Maria (Sarah Brightman)
3. Pie Jesu (Sarah Brightman & Narcis)
4. Silent Night (Sarah Brightman)
5. La Luna (Sarah Brightman)
6. Nutcracker (Orchestra)
7. Gaudate / Ding Dong (Gregorian)
8. In Dulce Jubilo (Orchestra)
9. Arrival (Sarah Brightman)
10. I Believe in Father Christmas (Sarah Brightman)
11. The Phantom of the Opera (Sarah Brightman & Mario Frangoulis)
12. Time to Say Goodbye (Sarah Brightman)

Encore

1. Fairytale in New York (Amelia Brightman & Gregorian)
2. Hymn (Sarah Brightman & Gregorian)
3. Amazing Grace (Sarah Brightman)
4. Happy Christmas (Sarah Brightman, Amelia Brightman, Gregorian, Mario Frangoulis, Fernando Varela & Narcis)

== Tour dates ==
List of 2017 concerts
Date	City	Country	Venue
20 November 2017	Aalborg	Denmark	Congress & Culture Center
23 November 2017	Helsinki	Finland	Hartwall Arena
24 November 2017	Tallinn	Estonia	Nordea Concert Hall
26 November 2017	Moscow	Russia	Crocus City Hall
28 November 2017	St. Petersburg	Russia	Ice Palace
30 November 2017	Kaunas	Lithuania	Žalgiris Arena
1 December 2017	Riga	Latvia	Arena Riga
3 December 2017	Minsk	Belarus	Palace of the Republic
5 December 2017	Berlin	Germany	Tempodrom
6 December 2017	Hanover	Germany	Kuppelsaal
7 December 2017	Oberhausen	Germany	König Pilsener Arena
9 December 2017	Erfurt	Germany	Messe
10 December 2017	Hamburg	Germany	Mehr! Theater
11 December 2017	Frankfurt	Germany	Liederhalle venue series
12 December 2017	Stuttgart	Germany	Liederhalle venue series
13 December 2017	Zurich	Switzerland	Samsung Hall
14 December 2017	Munich	Germany	Philharmonie
16 December 2017	Prague	Czech Republic	Tipsport Arena
17 December 2017	Łódź	Poland	Atlas Arena
20 December 2017	Budapest	Hungary	László Papp Budapest Sports Arena
21 December 2017	Zagreb	Croatia	Arena Zagreb
22 December 2017	Ljubljana	Slovenia	Arena Stožice
23 December 2017	Vienna	Austria	Stadthalle F
