= Sadıqov =

Sadıqov is a surname. Notable people with the surname include:

- Nizami Sadıqov, Azerbaijani footballer
- Rashad Sadiqov (footballer, born 1983), Azerbaijani footballer
- Sadıq Sadıqov (born 1965), Azerbaijani sports administrator

== See also ==
- Sadikov
