= Erkan Aki =

Swiss singer

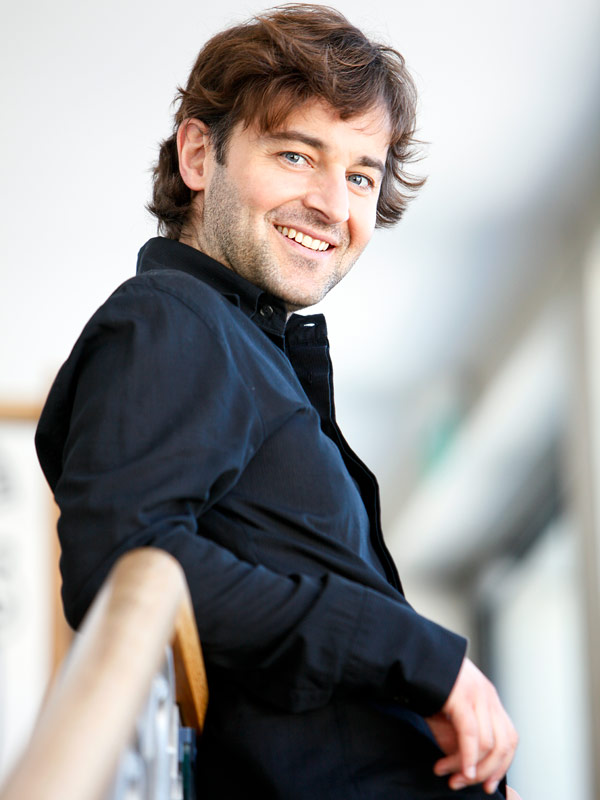
Erkan Aki

Erkan Aki (born June 20, 1969 in Sursee) is a Swiss cross-over singer between pop music and classics with Turkish descent. The classically trained tenor sings in seven languages.

== Career ==
Erkan’s professional journey on the way to becoming one of the world’s best tenors started at the age of seventeen. After attending a performance of Johann Strauss’ operetta "Die Fledermaus" at the Zurich Opera House, he decided to study classical singing. The radiant elegance of this all-encompassing work of art which combines sophisticated operetta with the visual dazzle of architectural splendor left a lasting impression on young Erkan. Up to that point, his musical preferences had been more along the lines of contemporary sounds, e.g. the band Eurythmics and their lead singer Annie Lennox whose voice made a huge impression on Aki. While studying under Swiss tenor and music teacher Paul Späni, Erkan specialized in Applied Vocal Music. However, in parallel to his singing lessons Erkan also successfully completed his education in business management during the period 1986 to 1989. After the death of his music teacher Paul Späni in 1993, Erkan decided to relocate to his second home away from home, back to his family’s roots in Istanbul, where he studied Music Theory for three years. On his return, he put himself in the capable hands of music professor Jane Thorner-Mengedoht of Zurich Music Conservatory. She has been mentoring him to this day and also teaches artists like Ana Maria Labin and Ruben Drole.

Erkan happened to make a studio recording with Atilla Sereftug, the composer of Grand Prix d‘Eurovision 1988 winning song "Ne partez pas sans moi" made world-famous by Céline Dion. By sheer stroke of luck, this recording made it into the hands of renowned concert promoter and agent David Lieberberg who helped Erkan get his first record contract Aki recorded with producer Nigel Wright his first album "Here`s to the Heros". The album stormed the German charts.

In 2013, Erkan accompanied soprano Sarah Brightman on her Dreamchaser World Tour, joining Brightman for the songs "Canto Della Terra" and "The Phantom of the Opera."

== Life ==
Erkan Aki was born 20 June 1969 in the Swiss community of Sursee. His parents, mom Remziye and dad Ahmet, emigrated from Turkey to the Swiss Canton of Lucerne in the late 60s. Erkan and his two older brothers, Aykut and Harun, the latter having died in an accident in 1994, grew up as the product of two very different cultures. Both cultures have retained a powerful influence over Erkan’s life to this day, and are the driving force behind his active interest in integration processes. His awards in recognition of his efforts on behalf of intercultural projects include the 2002 German-Turkish Friendship Award. Until he was eleven years old, this Swiss with a Turkish background spent his childhood close to his native town of Willisau, a small-sized tourist attraction famous to this day for its international Jazz Festival. In 1980 the family relocated to Neftenbach in the greater Winterthur area where the parents opened a coffee house.

Later on, Erkan Aki moved to Zurich. In 1998, he had to cope with another second stroke of fate after the early death of his brother Harun: only four years after his brother died, his father Ahmet also died at 62. Erkan Aki then got to know his wife Anna Steiner through their music teacher Jane Thorner-Mengedoht. In 2010, their son was born. Erkan Aki is also committed to social activities, amongst others, to the José-Carreras-Foundation and UNICEF.

== Awards ==
The artist received the German-Turkish Friendship Award for his work in intercultural projects in 2002.

== Releases and appearances ==
In 1999, Erkan Aki performed at the Brandenburger Tor his song "Here’s to the Heroes". As a follow-up album, he released the album "Pop Classics".

His close affinity to Germany and the German-speaking countries and the fact that he had more success here than elsewhere were the main reasons behind Erkan’s decision to record his following album "Zeit der großen Gefühle" (Time of Deep Emotions) only in German. He recorded several titles for this album with international stars like Xavier Naidoo and Patricia Kaas, including the Maffay classic "Über sieben Brücken musst du gehen". The song "Unter der Haut" by Patricia Kaas was recorded in a German-French version and became the title song of TV drama "Sturmzeit".

Aki’s fourth studio album, "Songs for Lovers", included a guest performance by Montserrat Martí, the daughter of Montserrat Caballé. His fifth album is named "Music in my Heart" and contains reinterpretations of hits like "The Power of Love" and "Time to Say Goodbye". Two more albums follow in quick succession: "In Love for Europe", which features him singing in seven different languages, and the Christmas album "Romantische Weihnachten".

In 2008, Aki performed live in Xanten Arena together with Montserrat Caballé a mix of popular classic hits and opera arias. In 2009 he toured South and Central America with Sarah Brightman, and in 2010, Japan, China, Korea, and Canada. In 2009, he also released the best-of album "Nur die Hits" ("Just the Hits"). In September 2010, he performed in a gala held in the Palace of Tranquil Longevity within Beijing’s Forbidden City.

== Discography – CD and DVD ==
Previously published albums 1999 "Here's To The Heroes" 2000 "Pop Classics" 2001 "time of great emotion" 2002 "Songs for Lovers" 2005 "Music in my Heart" 2008 "Romantic Christmas" 2008 "In Love for Europe" 2009 "Only the hits" 2012 "True Love" (MOKOH Music) DVD Great voices, great songs " DVD The gala night of the German Tenors "
