= Gala – The Collection =

Album by Sarah Brightman

Greatest hits album by Sarah Brightman
- Released: Japan: 6 July 2016
- Genre: Pop rock/classical crossover
- Label: Universal Music

Sarah Brightman chronology
| Dreamchaser (2013) | Gala – The Collection (2016) | Hymn (2018) |

Gala – The Collection is a compilation album from Sarah Brightman released on 6 July in commemoration of the Japan tour, Gala - An Evening with Sarah Brightman.

The album includes leading songs in her career such as "Time to Say Goodbye (solo version)," "Nessun Dorma," "Canto Della Terra," "Stranger in Paradise," and "Pie Jesu." It features the high-fidelity SHM-CD format. It had a Japanese original release. Tracks 16–18 are bonus tracks.

== Track listing ==
| No. | Title | Length |
|---|---|---|
| 1. | "Stand Alone (Vocalise)" | 4:15 |
| 2. | "Anytime, Anywhere" | 3:22 |
| 3. | "Dust in the Wind" | 3:45 |
| 4. | "Carpe Diem (duet with Mario Frangoulis)" | 4:01 |
| 5. | "It’s a Beautiful Day" | 4:00 |
| 6. | "La Luna" | 5:02 |
| 7. | "A Whiter Shade of Pale" | 3:41 |
| 8. | "Canto Della Terra (duet with Andrea Bocelli)" | 4:03 |
| 9. | "Nessun Dorma" | 3:10 |
| 10. | "Figlio Perduto" | 4:41 |
| 11. | "Stranger in Paradise" | 4:31 |
| 12. | "There for Me (featuring José Cura)" | 3:35 |
| 13. | "Running" | 5:40 |
| 14. | "Pie Jesu" | 3:47 |
| 15. | "Time to Say Goodbye (Con te partirò)" | 4:08 |
| 16. | "Hawaii '78" | 4:41 |
| 17. | "In the Air" | 4:39 |
| 18. | "Done (Classical Version)" | 3:45 |

== Chart performance ==
| Chart (2016) | Peak position |
|---|---|
| Japanese Albums (Oricon) | 22 |
