= Gala: An Evening with Sarah Brightman =

2016–17 concert tour by Sarah Brightman

Gala - An Evening With Sarah Brightman
- Tour by Sarah Brightman
- Location: Asia; Europe; North America
- Associated album: Gala - Sarah Brightman The Collection
- Start date: 7 July 2016
- End date: 11 March 2017
- Legs: 4
- No. of shows: 25

Sarah Brightman concert chronology
- Dreamchaser World Tour (2013-2014); Gala - An Evening With Sarah Brightman (2016); Royal Christmas Gala (2017)

Gala - An Evening With Sarah Brightman was a 2016–17 concert tour by English soprano singer Sarah Brightman with eleven shows in Japan, three in South Korea and three in Mexico.

The Gala Tour features a classical crossover repertoire. Mario Frangoulis share duets like "The Phantom of the Opera," "Canto De La Terra" and "Carpe Diem," recorded with Frangoulis on Brightman's "A Winter Symphony" album, which he also features as a bonus track on "Tales of Christmas," his first holiday album released in 2015. Joining the two singers are pianist Di Wu, counter tenor Narcis Iustin Ianău, and maestro Paul Bateman, the show is directed by Anthony Van Laast.

For Japan concerts, Brightman sang the song titled "Stand Alone", from the drama Saka no ue no kumo (坂の上の雲; lit. Clouds over the hills) composed by Joe Hisaishi and performed by the NHK Symphony Orchestra.

== Set list ==
ACT I

1. "Sunset Boulevard Overture"
2. "Harem" (Only Turkey)
3. "Stand Alone" (Only Japan)
4. "Nella Fantasia" (Not performed in Japan and Turkey)
5. "Anytime Anywhere"
6. "Dust in the Wind"
7. "Carpe Diem" (with Mario Frangoulis)
8. "It's a Beautiful Day"
9. "La Luna"
10. "Rachmaninov #23" (Tsusi) (Di Wu solo)
11. "A Whiter Shade of Pale"
12. "Scarborough Fair" (Not performed in Japan)
13. "Buongiorno Principessa" (Mario Frangoulis solo) (Not performed in Mexico)
14. "Vincero Perdero" (Mario Frangoulis solo) (only Mexico)
15. "Canto Della Terra" (with Mario Frangoulis)
16. "Nessun Dorma"

ACT II

1. "Spellbound Concerto" (Di Wu solo)
2. "Figlio Perduto"
3. "Stranger in Paradise"
4. "There for Me" (with Mario Frangoulis)
5. "Pie Jesu" (with Narcis Iustin Ianău)
6. "Caruso" (Narcis Iustin Ianău solo)
7. "The Phantom of The Opera" (with Mario Frangoulis) and (Erkan Aki in Turkey)
8. "Time to Say Goodbye"

Encore

1. "Warsaw Concerto" (Paul Bateman on piano with Brightman conducting)
2. "Running"
3. "Ave María" Schubert (Only Mexico)

== Concert style ==
The concert style is very classical as Frangoulis stated "I particularly like the Gala Tour concept because it brings us both back to our roots in the theatre and classical music" Brightman said in an interview "The concert has a hollywood feel about it, I'm doing beautiful classical pieces and crossover pieces... In all it will be a very rich concert, very glamorous looking and will take us back in time".

She uses different gowns, Park Jin-han from Korea Times wrote: "As the sound of wind meets the audience and the stage gleams with an eerie red light, Sarah Brightman, one of the world's most popular English classical crossover singers, appears on stage in a glittering silver dress and sings the theme song of the musical The Phantom of the Opera.

In Antalya's concert an orchestra of 50 have accompanied her on the stage. Sarah opened her concert with "Harem" which gave its name to her 7th album that hit the shelves in 2003, singing famous arias and crossover hits during the concert but also she invited Erkan Aki to sing with her some duets.

== Tour dates ==
List of 2016 concerts
Date	City	Country	Venue	Gross revenue
7 July 2016	Sapporo	Japan	Sapporo Hokkai Kitayell	
9 July 2016	Sendai	Japan	Sendai Xebio Arena	
11 July 2016	Tokyo	Japan	Nippon Budokan	
12 July 2016	Tokyo	Japan	Nippon Budokan	
14 July 2016	Tokyo	Japan	Tokyo International Forum	
15 July 2016	Tokyo	Japan	Tokyo International Forum	
17 July 2016	Kanazawa	Japan	Kanazawa Honda No Mori Hall	
19 July 2016	Osaka	Japan	Festival Hall	
20 July 2016	Osaka	Japan	Festival Hall	
21 July 2016	Osaka	Japan	Orix Theater	
22 July 2016	Nagoya	Japan	Nagoya Century Hall	
24 July 2016	Seoul	South Korea	Olympic Hall	
26 July 2016	Daegu	South Korea	EXCO	
27 July 2016	Gwangju	South Korea	Unversiade Gymnasium	
29 July 2016	Zhengzhou	China	Zhengzhou International Convention and Exhibition Centre	
31 July 2016	Suzhou	China	Suzhou Sports Centre	
3 August 2016	Harbin	China	Harbin Opera House	
5 August 2016	Tianjin	China	Tianjin Grand Theatre	
7 August 2016	Taipei	Taiwan	Taipei Arena	
9 October 2016	Antalya	Turkey	Expo Congress Center	
1 December 2016	Mexico City	Mexico	Arena Ciudad de México	
3 December 2016	Zapopan	Mexico	Telmex Auditorium	
5 December 2016	Monterrey	Mexico	Arena Monterrey	

List of 2017 concerts
Date	City	Country	Venue	Gross revenue
11 March 2017	Tainan	Taiwan	Tainan City Stadium	
14 August 2017	Yogyakarta	Indonesia	Prambanan Jazz Festival	

== Critical reception ==
The Gala show received positive reviews from critics. Park Jin-han from Korea Times wrote: "Her voice had such power, striking hard and strong at once and yet soft and tender as well.". Antalya Expo's official website wrote: "Singing famous opera and classical music pieces during the concert, British soprano made the audience impressed by her strong voice and style."
