= Juanqinzhai =

Hall in the Palace of Tranquil Longevity, Beijing, China

Juanqinzhai (simplified Chinese: 倦勤斋; traditional Chinese: 倦勤齋), or the "Studio of Exhaustion From Diligent Service", is a hall in the Palace of Tranquil Longevity built by the aging Qianlong Emperor as part of his retirement suite. After announcing his desire to retire from the throne, the emperor began building a retirement suite, the Palace of Tranquil Longevity, in the northeast corner of the Forbidden City. This complex, also called the Qianlong Garden, was built with the highest quality and designed with the most exceptional Chinese techniques. Juanqinzhai was an imperial lodge in the north end of the garden, and contains rare examples of murals painted on silk and bamboo craftsmanship.

In 2002, the World Monuments Fund (WMF) began a partnership with the Palace Museum to restore the Qianlong Garden. The first of the 27 pavilions to be restored was the Juanqinzhai, which was completed in 2008. Because of the huge success of this restoration, the partnership has been extended so that each of the other 26 buildings in the garden can be fully restored.

== History ==
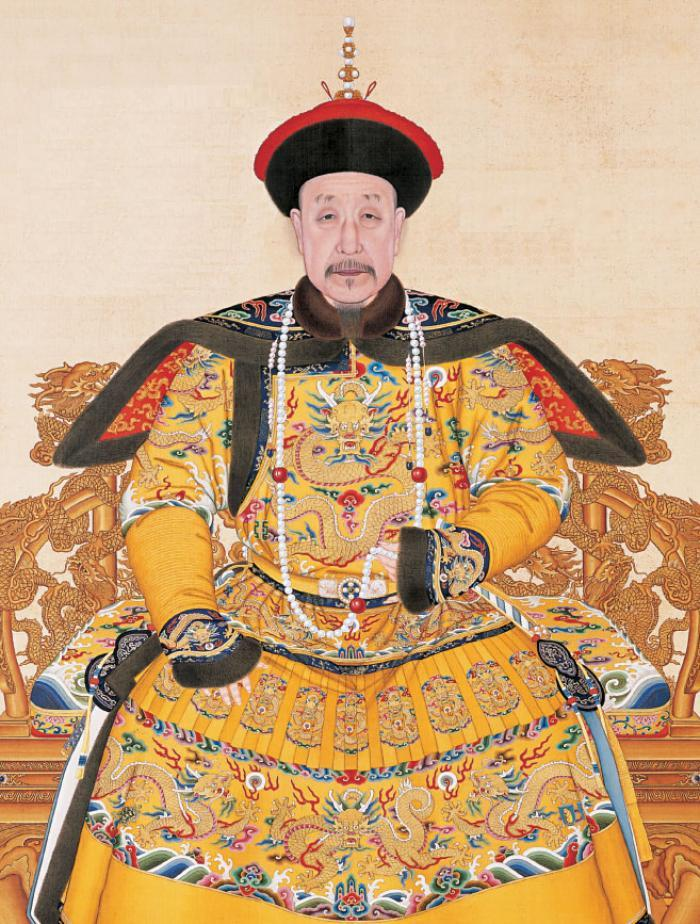
The aging Qianlong Emperor.

Juanqinzhai was built as part of the Palace of Tranquil Longevity in the Forbidden City. The Qianlong Emperor ruled from the Forbidden City in Beijing, where he presided over the zenith of the Qing Dynasty. Art and architecture flourished during his reign and China reached a new peak of wealth and culture. The Qianlong Emperor's passion for painting, sculpture and embroidery extended to his palaces. Even late in his reign, when the Qianlong Garden was being built, the emperor's passion for art was displayed in the beautiful decoration of the pavilions and halls there. The Qianlong Emperor's grandfather, the Kangxi Emperor, had such a long and impressive reign that intimidated the Qianlong Emperor so much that he refused to out-reign his grandfather. In 1772, in anticipation of his planned retirement, the Qianlong Emperor ordered the construction of a small retreat. These small buildings were much different from the monumental buildings in the Outer Court and were much more intimate. However, these buildings remained as dignified and noble as the governmental buildings, as they would be still be the home and office of the Retired Qianlong Emperor.

After the completion of the imperial residence, the emperor prepared to move into his new home. The Qianlong Emperor abdicated in 1796, leaving the throne to his son, who would reign as the Jiaqing Emperor. However, between 1796 and 1799, the Qianlong Emperor continued to effectively rule China behind the scenes, and the Jiaqing Emperor was emperor in name only. Despite the creation of the beautiful gardens and buildings of the Palace of Tranquil Longevity, the Qianlong Emperor never moved into his new suite, and remained in the traditional residence of the emperors. After the emperors death, an edict was produced ordering that no one could rebuild or change the designs of the garden, preserving it untouched. This edict is one of the main reasons that the original eighteenth century interiors remained in the Juanqinzhai and other buildings of the garden. When the last emperor was removed from the Forbidden City in 1924, the doors of the Qianlong Garden and many other halls of the Forbidden City were locked and forgotten.

=== Restoration ===
In 2001, after years of neglect, the World Monuments Fund began a partnership with the Palace Museum in Beijing to restore the Qianlong Garden. The project, which cost 18 million, is slated to be finished in 2019, in time for the 600th anniversary of the construction of the Forbidden City (2020). Juanqinzhai's murals, which are the only large ensemble of eighteenth illusionist painting in China, were removed from their backing, and painstakingly cleaned. After much searching, the conservators found a source of paper for the new backing. This paper was made using traditional materials rather than modern techniques, which is revolutionary for a Chinese restoration. In China, "historic preservation usually entails razing a structure and replacing it with a brightly painted replica."

In Suzhou, the same city where the Qianlong Emperor himself ordered silks, dozens or workers labored extensively to produce the beautiful screens that decorate the reception room and the theater room. Each of the embroideries were carefully sewn by hand, even the unique double-sided transparent screens in the audience hall. Like the paper, a trial and error process was used to produce the brocade on the various thrones and tables. It took many tries to replicate the Qing dynasty "cloud brocade" which was used extensively in Juanqinzhai. Finally, a carver of inner skin bamboo was found to carve the deer in relief in the audience hall. The restoration of Juanqinzhai was lauded throughout China and the West as a milestone in the history of restoration, especially in the Forbidden City. The Chinese team even raised another $5 million to help with the restoration of the other 26 buildings of the Qianlong Garden.

== Layout ==
Though he never stayed in Juanqinzhai, the Qianlong Emperor still planned the Palace of Tranquil Longevity as his personal retreat, filled with his favorite designs and motifs. From the eastern entrance, the emperor entered a large, two storied audience room, paneled with bamboo and silk screens. On the lower half of the screen is a carving of deer playing amongst pines and rocks, while the top half of each partition is decorated with an intricate, semitransparent silk screen. In the center of lower level sits a formal throne, embroidered in imperial yellow and flanked by traditional Chinese couplets. Behind the partitions is an enfilade of rooms, filled with calligraphy, artworks, and mirrors. On both floors, the emperor had a set of private rooms and thrones, each filled with natural light, due to the semi-transparent silk screens, which also appear on both levels.

On the western half of Juanqinzhai is the "Theater Room". In this section, a small pavilion equipped with a stage is surrounded by a bamboo fence and is faced by another two-floored viewing platform, from which the emperor could watch theatrical performances. The pavilion and fence bring to mind the outdoors, and the warm colors of the bamboo and the light from the windows bring the feeling of summer into this room. Though the room has a warm and informal feel, the ideals of the Forbidden City are still present in the room. Like the columns in the main halls in the Outer Court, the faux bamboo is made of a rare nanmu tree, painted to look like bamboo. Despite this expensive touch, the pièce de résistance of the room are the floor-to-ceiling trompe-l'œil murals hung here. Such trompe-l'œil murals were introduced by Giuseppe Castiglione in the Old Summer Palace but in Juanqinzhai the murals were likely to have been painted by his assistant Wang Youxue. On the wall the bamboo fence is replicated in paint, and behind it stands a large pavilion with trees and birds. Mimicking the real bamboo fence, the mural also contains a circular "moon gate", where a crane stands watch. On the ceiling is a bamboo lattice motif, interlaced with vibrant grapevines. Here, the emperor could entertain his passion for art, gardening, and theatre throughout the year.
