= Sadikov =

Sadikov (Russian: Садиков) is a masculine surname, its feminine counterpart being Sadikova. They may refer to

- Damir Sadikov (born 1991), Russian football player
- Maksud Sadikov (1963–2011), Russian Muslim scholar
- Tolibjon Sadikov (1907–1957), Uzbekistani composer
- Alisa Sadikova (born 2003), prodigy classical harpist from Russia

== See also ==
- Sadykov
