= George Perris =

Greek singer (born 1983)

George Perris Γιώργος Περρής
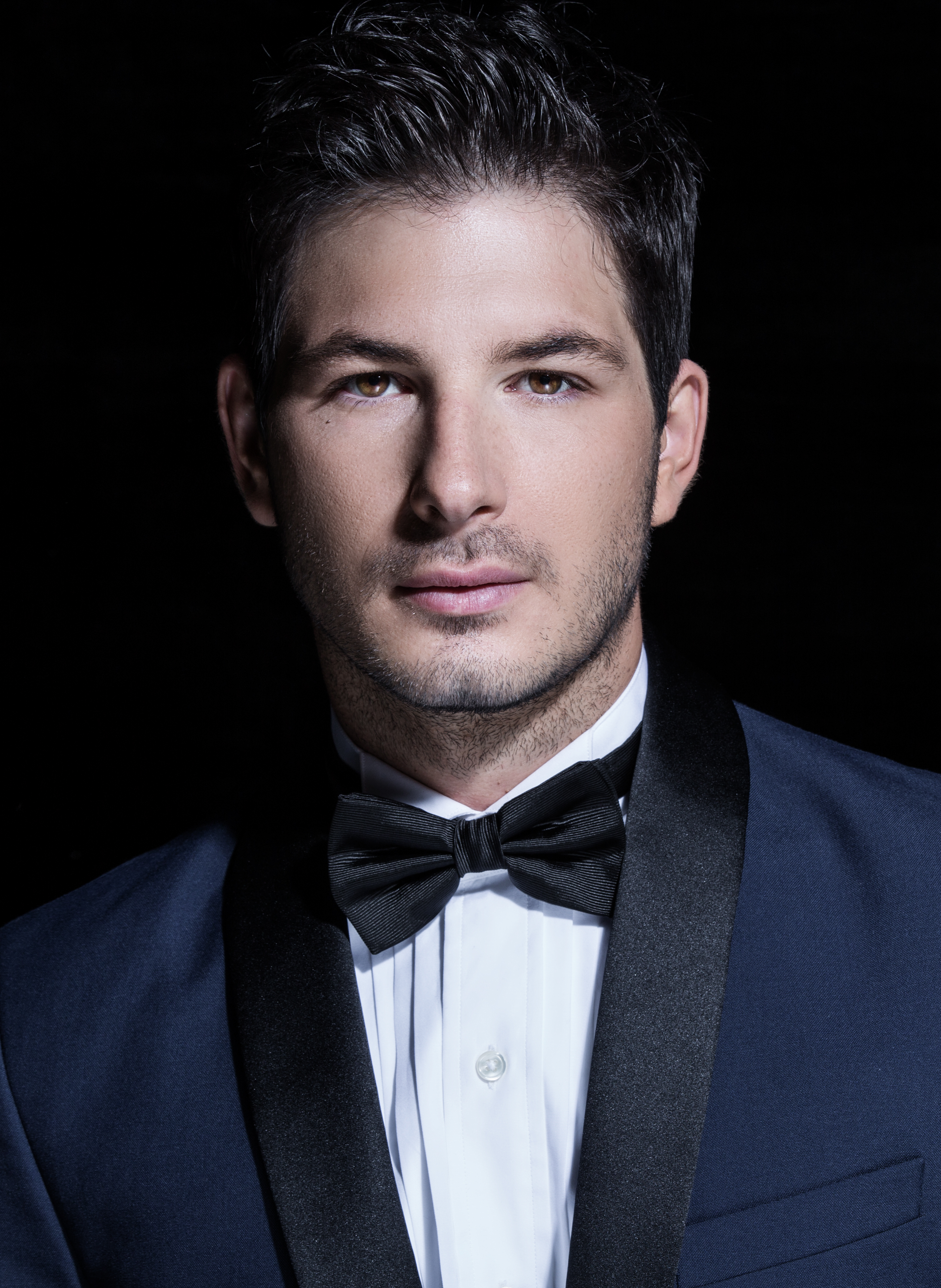
- Perris in 2015

Background information
- Born: 24 August 1983 (age 43); Athens, Greece
- Genres: Pop; jazz
- Occupations: Singer; songwriter
- Instruments: Vocals; piano
- Years active: 2002–present
- Labels: Minos EMI; EMI; Sony Music Greece; Universal Music Group; Decca Records
- Website: georgeperris.com

George Perris (Greek: Γιώργος Περρής; born 24 August 1983) is a Greek-French singer and songwriter. He is multilingual, and sings in English, Greek, French and Spanish. He is set to represent Cyprus in the Eurovision Song Contest 2027.

== Early life ==
George Perris was born and raised in Athens, Greece, to a Greek father and a French mother, the novel writer Joëlle Lopinot. Perris studied Greek literature, Ancient Greek, and Latin at the National and Kapodistrian University of Athens.

== Career ==
=== 2005–2008: Debut solo album and early years ===
Perris' performing career began at the age of 18, when he was invited to tour with composer Mimis Plessas. He was featured on Plessas' 2006 album Mimis Plessas and the Jazz Quartet Live. His first solo album, Kainouria mou mera (My new day) was released in 2005 by EMI and included the hit songs "Pezi o erotas" which was the theme song from the TV series "Erotas", as well as "Karavani" which was included in a compilation created by Radio Française.

The following year, he toured with acclaimed Greek tenor Mario Frangoulis. Frangoulis invited him back for his "Mario & Friends" performance series at the Athens Arena where he appeared on stage with international artists such as Lucio Dalla, Justin Hayward, Madeleine Peyroux, Lara Fabian and Frances Ruffelle. As a result, 2 live albums were released in 2008 and 2009, Mario & Friends 1 and Mario & Friends 2 which were both certified platinum album. In April 2008, Perris also released his second studio album Pairno anasa with Sony Music. The album featured Stis gis tin akri, a duet with Mario Frangoulis. He wrote and composed almost half of the songs on that record. Perris continued touring in 2009, performing in Greece, Cyprus and Turkey.

=== 2009–2011: First appearances outside of Greece ===
In 2009, international diva Lara Fabian invited him to open some concerts of her 2009 European tour, including 2 sold-out performances at the Zénith Paris. During the same year, he also performed in Boston, as a guest of the Greek Institute, and also in St. Petersburg, Russia and London with the Oxford Philomusica.

In 2010, Perris performed again in the US as part of Frangoulis' "Light of Greece" tour, performing concerts in Chicago, Boston and New York. He also traveled to Canada, as a guest of Stephan Moccio, performing at the Place des Arts in Montreal. Perris appeared in a 2010 production of Mikis Theodorakis' adaptation of March of the Spirit (poetry: Angelos Sikelianos). This show was performed in both Greece and Turkey, as part of an attempt to improve international relations between the two countries.

In 2011, Perris was invited by Stephan Moccio to participate in a concert in Toronto, Canada. He also performed with soprano Deborah Myers in Athens. This concert was broadcast on national television. In the summer, Perris toured with Mario Frangoulis in Turkey and a few months later he took part in a tribute concert to Mimis Plessas. He also recorded the a cappella single "Humana" adapted by Women of the World which was released the same year.

=== 2012–2013: French album Un souhait and "LIVE" album in Greece ===
In the spring of 2012, he released his third studio album Un Souhait in Canada. The album included 11 new songs in French, composed for him by some of the most acclaimed French-speaking songwriters as well as Ma Solitude, a duet with Belgian superstar Lara Fabian.

In June, he shared the stage with Mario Frangoulis, Hayley Westenra and Alkistis Protopsalti at the Boston Symphony Hall with the Boston Pops Orchestra under the baton of Keith Lockhart. The same concert was performed in Athens, Greece at the Herod Atticus Theatre.

In October of the same year, he performed with the St. Louis Symphony Orchestra conducted by Robert Baker.

The release of the Un souhait album earlier in 2012 in Canada led to the Un Souhait Tour presented by the Horatio Alger Association for whom Perris serves as an International Ambassador. The last show of the tour was filmed and released on the Live à Montréal DVD exclusively on his website.

In December, George Perris returned to Greece and released a new "Live" album produced by Alkistis Protopsalti. The album included various Greek, French and English classics that Perris had performed live over the last 2 years.

In 2013, Perris toured extensively with Alkistis Protopsalti in Greece and Cyprus as well as performing in Montreal, Canada and Pasadena, California.

=== 2014–2015: Debut English album Picture This ===
He spent most of 2013 recording his new English album. In November, he released I will wait for you/Les Parapluies de Cherbourg, the first song from this album for free. In January 2014, George Perris traveled to New York for his debut performance as an international ambassador of Horatio Alger Association at Jazz at Lincoln Center.This show titled ‘George Perris Live at Jazz at Lincoln Center’ was broadcast in spring 2014 on American cable networks, and released as the DVD titled "Live in New York" on 15 August 2014, in Australia. In May 2014, his debut English-language album titled Picture This was released in the US and Canada. For this album, Perris collaborated with producers Marco Marinangeli, Simon Hale, Mark Portmann and Michael Smidi Smith as well as the Prague Symphony Orchestra.The album was later released in Australia through Decca Records.

In August, he joined Australian superstar Tina Arena on her Reset tour of Australia. In addition, Perris performed at Bangkok's 16th International Festival of Dance and Music in October along with Mario Frangoulis. They also gave two concerts in Turkey.

On 17 November 2014, George Perris performed the American National Anthem at Madison Square Garden at the New York Knicks and Washington Wizards Game.

His debut PBS special "Live from Jazz at Lincoln Center" was aired on PBS in the US from November 2015 to March 2016 to great success, allowing him to bring his "Picture This Tour" in the U.S. for the first time.

=== 2016: Return to Greece: "Kivotos" Album ===
In April 2016, he announced on his official page on Facebook that he was recording an album of duets with fellow Greek tenor Mario Frangoulis and then touring Greece and Cyprus together. The album "Kivotos" / "Ark" was released on 1 May in Greece through the newspaper "Kathimerini" selling more than 65000 copies in one day. Subsequently, it was released in a deluxe package on 10 May in Greece and Cyprus, skyrocketing to No. 4 on the Greek album charts where it remained for 4 weeks. Perris embarked on a joint summer tour of Greece and Cyprus with Mario Frangoulis, playing in more than 17 dates.

Perris and Frangoulis ended their joint tour with a sold-out performance at the historic Odeon of Herodes Atticus under the Acropolis in Athens with special guests Jorge Calandrelli and Tina Arena. The concert was called "Mediterranea" and was filmed for American Public Television. Perris performed 3 new songs from his upcoming English album to be released in 2017. Following the performance, critics wrote that Perris stole the performance and was the apocalypse of the evening.

In November, he performed with Michel Legrand as a special guest of the legendary composer's concerts in Moscow, at the Crocus City Hall and St. Petersburg at Oktbryasky Hall.

=== 2017–2018: New Greek Single "Pios Fovate Tin Agapi" ===
In January 2017, Perris released a new single called "Pios fovate tin agapi" (Who's afraid of love) through Universal Music composed by acclaimed Greek composer Evanthia Reboutsika and lyrics by Aris Davarakis, making this his first original Greek song since 2008. He announced that a second single titled "Iliofania" would be released in the Spring. In February, he performed his first solo shows in Greece in over 6 years to great acclaim.

=== 2019: New International Album "Who I'm Meant To Be" and TV Special "Live At The Acropolis" ===
In January 2019, Perris released "How Many Does It Take", a new single about addiction from his upcoming second English album "Who I'm Meant To Be". The single received critical acclaim, especially after Whoopi Goldberg posted the video of the song on her social media.

In May, his album "Who I'm Meant To Be" was released through his label Destin Productions. The United Nations posted the song "She Walks On" on their social media, a song about a Syrian refugee girl. Perris went on to promote the album in the US, as well as in Europe. In June, he released his second PBS Television Special "Live At The Acropolis" through American Public Television, filmed at the historic Odeon of Herodes Atticus at the foot of the Acropolis of Athens. The Special features Tina Arena as his special guest and includes songs from his latest album as well as standards from his repertoire.

=== 2020: Return to Greece & "Stathera sta oneira" album ===
In June 2020, he released "Stathera sta oneira", his first album of original Greek songs, composed by acclaimed songwriters Evanthia Reboutsika and Lina Nikolakopoulou. The album peaked at no 3 in the Greek charts and remained there for 4 consecutive weeks. His song "Kardia koita", a duet with Greek icon George Dalaras became the theme title of the TV series "Aggeliki" and went on to reach mainstream success.

In September, he became the first singer in Greek history to film a concert on the grounds of an ancient temple, the temple of Aphaea on the island of Aegina in his home country, Greece. The TV special, under the title "A Sunset In Greece", was produced in collaboration with the Greek National Tourism Organization to promote Greece around the world. Mario Frangoulis and Evanthia Reboutsika appeared as special guests on the performance.

=== 2021–2022: New English Album & PBS TV Special ===
A year after its filming, "A Sunset In Greece" started airing on PBS stations across the US, reaching more than 100 million viewers in its first 2 months of airing, making it Perris' most successful TV Special to date.

In December 2021, he was chosen by the Grammy Awards for their "Global Spin" video series, which showcases international artists. Perris performed his upcoming title "No Armor" under the Acropolis, promoting his country.

In March 2022, he released his 3rd English album, "No Armor". The album included mostly covers of songs that had influenced Perris' musicality, as well as English translations of 3 of his Greek songs. In April, he collaborated once again with the Grammy Awards, releasing a cover of Mariah Carey's "Butterfly" for their "Reimagined at home" series.

In the summer of 2022, he went on a joint tour with acclaimed Greek singer Eleftheria Arvanitaki across Greece and Cyprus.

=== 2026–present: Eurovision Song Contest ===
On 4 November 2026, the Cyprus Broadcasting Corporation (CyBC) announced that Perris would represent Cyprus in the Eurovision Song Contest 2027 in Burgas, Bulgaria.

== Artistry ==
Perris possesses the vocal range of a tenor. He is multilingual and sings in Greek, French, English and Spanish. His vocal style is characterized as crossover music, combining adult contemporary music, pop and vocal music. His influences include Greek icon Nana Mouskouri, as well as Maria Callas, Lara Fabian, George Dalaras, Charles Aznavour and George Michael.

== Activism ==
Perris is an International Ambassador for the Horatio Alger Association of Distinguished Americans, an association that offers scholarships to students in the US and Canada that come from adversity. He has performed in numerous galas to raise funds for children in need in various countries.

In June 2022, he became a UNICEF Goodwill Ambassador, specializing in fighting violence against children. His idol, Greek legend Nana Mouskouri appointed him as an ambassador through a special video she recorded for the occasion.

== Personal life ==
In March 2022, Perris came out as gay during an interview with People magazine. He explained that he finally felt ready to do it after years of fearing it might hurt his career, but mainly as he wanted to be a positive influence on young people, filling a void that existed when he was growing up.

== Discography ==
Year	Title	Type	Record label
2005	Me mia mihani	Single	Minos EMI / EMI
2005	Kainouria mou mera	Studio album	Minos EMI / EMI
2008	Pairno anasa	Studio album	Sony Music Greece
2009	Paradosou	Promo-single	Sony Music Greece
2012	Un souhait / Cast A Spell	Single	Productions EM / Distribution Select
2012	Un Souhait	Studio album	Productions EM / Distribution Select
2012	I koupasti	Single	Heaven Music
2012	Live	Live album	Heaven Music
2013	Live à Montréal	DVD	Productions EM / Destin Productions
2014	Picture This	Studio album	Destin Productions / Sony Music / RED Distribution
2014	Picture This	Studio album	Decca Records / Universal Music Group
2014	Live in New York	DVD	Decca Records / Universal Music Group
2016	Kivotos	Studio album	Minos EMI / Universal Music
2017	Pios Fovate Tin Agapi	Single	Minos EMI / Universal Music
2017	Iliofania	Single	Minos EMI / Universal Music
2018	Diko sou to pelago	Single	Minos EMI / Universal Music
2019	How Many Does It Take	Single	Destin Productions
2019	Who I'm Meant To Be	Album	Destin Productions
2020	Stathera Sta Onira	Album	Destin Productions / Minos EMI / Universal Music
2021	Disobey	Single	Destin Productions
2021	I Have A Dream	Single	Destin Productions
2021	Somewhere	Single	Destin Productions
2022	Ola kai poly	Single	Destin Productions / Minos EMI / Universal Music
2022	No Armor	Album	Destin Productions
2022	Disobey (ThroDef Remix)	Album	Destin Productions

=== Guest appearances ===
Year	Title	Artist	Company
2005	Mimis Plessas and the Jazz Quartet (Live)	Mimis Plessas	Universal Music
2008	Mario and Friends 1... What a Wonderful World	Mario Frangoulis	Sony Music
2009	Mario and Friends 2... It Makes the World Go Round	Mario Frangoulis	Sony Music
2010	To ftero tou drakou	Various artists	Mikri Arktos
2011	Mario My best of Frangoulis	Mario Frangoulis	Sony Music
2014	Superstar Christmas	Various artists	Decca Records / Universal Music Group

Awards and achievements
Preceded by Antigoni with "Jalla"	Cyprus in the Eurovision Song Contest; 2027	Succeeded by TBD
