= Palace of Tranquil Longevity =

Palace in the Forbidden City, China

- 寧壽宮
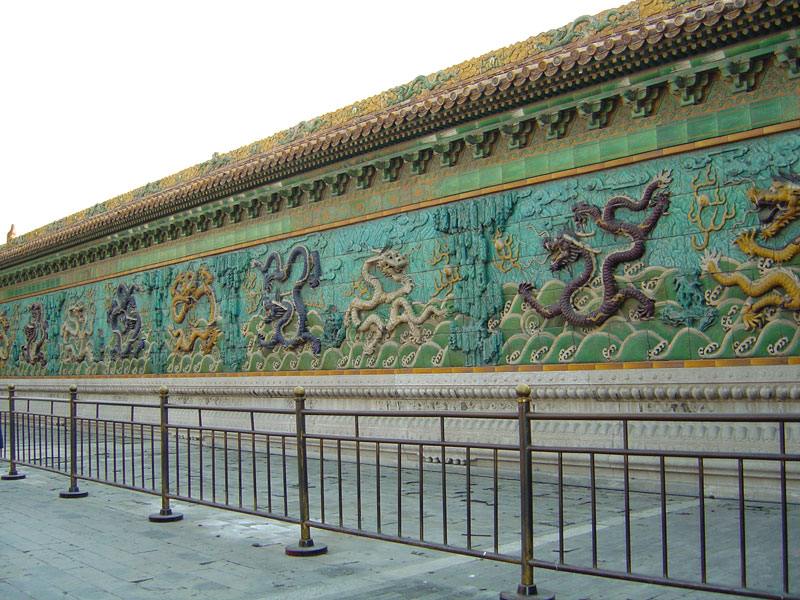
- The Nine Dragons Screen, made of glazed tile, on the front wall of the Palace of Tranquil Longevity
- Interactive map of the Palace of Tranquil Longevity area
- Alternative names: Qianlong Garden; Qianlong Palace; Qianlong District; Palace of Tranquility and Longevity

General information
- Location: Inner Court of the Forbidden City, Beijing, China
- Coordinates: 39.9184°N 116.3941°E
- Construction started: 1771
- Renovated: 2010-
- Client: Qianlong Emperor

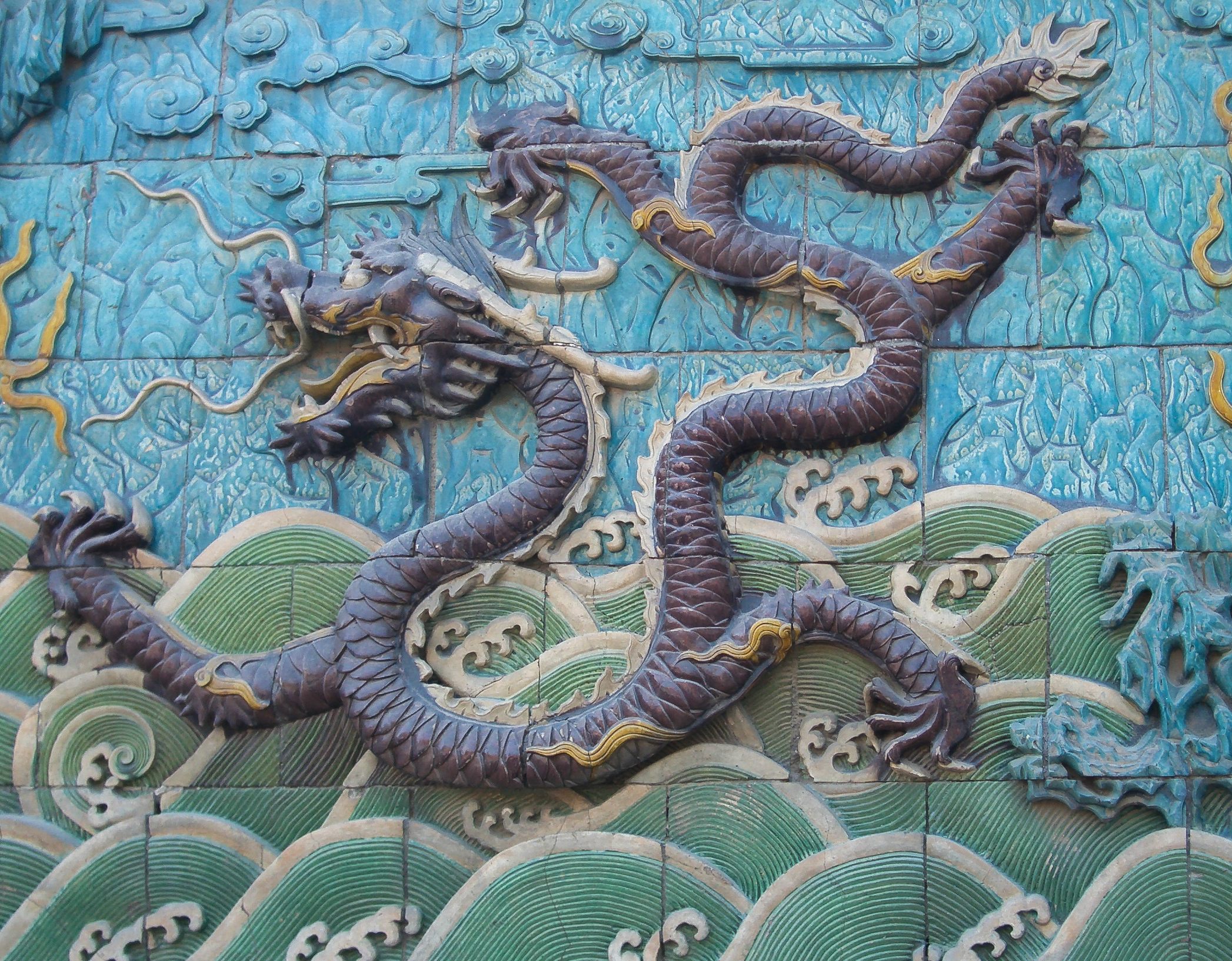
Detail of one of the nine dragons,

The Palace of Tranquil Longevity (Chinese: 寧壽宮), literally, "peaceful old age palace", also called the Qianlong Garden, Qianlong Palace, Qianlong District or the Palace of Tranquility and Longevity, is a palace in Beijing, China, located in the northeast corner of the Inner Court of the Forbidden City.

Construction of the palace began on the Qianlong Emperor's orders in 1771, in preparation for his retirement, although the emperor himself never moved into the palace. Its beautiful apartments, pavilions, gates and gardens feature "some of the most elegant spaces at a time widely considered to be the pinnacle of Chinese interior design." Throughout the Qing dynasty, the palace was almost never used, largely because of the Qianlong Emperor's imperial decree ordering his retirement retreat remain unaltered.

== History ==
In 1778, after a candidate at the imperial examination questioned the Qianlong Emperor publicly about naming a successor during an official tour in the north, the emperor, then 67 years old, announced in a court letter that "if fate would allow him to live so long, he would abdicate the throne at the age of 85 by Chinese reckoning, which would be in 1796." He "reassured the Chinese people that he had secretly chosen his heir, (Note: Following the dispute over the Kangxi Emperor's successor, from then onwards the Qing emperors designated their heirs in secret, with one copy of the will hidden in the Palace of Heavenly Purity and another carried at all times by the Emperor.) and that the choice was safely written down." His decision to "withdraw into leisure" was made to avoid breaking the record of his grandfather, the Kangxi Emperor, as the longest ruling emperor of China (61 years, 318 days), an important act of filial piety for the conservative Qianlong Emperor.

Although he pledged to retire, and took the title of Retired Emperor after officially yielding the throne to his son (the Jiaqing Emperor) after 60 years, 124 days of rule, the Qianlong Emperor never spent a night in his Palace of Tranquil Longevity, and continued to hold on to power. The Jiaqing Emperor reigned only nominally until his father's death on 7 February 1799, making the Qianlong Emperor's actual reign 63 years and 122 days long.

The construction of an imperial retirement retreat indicates the significance the Qianlong Emperor placed on honoring his grandfather, the Kangxi Emperor, and on public deference to Confucian thought and filial obligations, in contrast to previous Manchu (non-Han) rulers. This retirement palace was built as a cultural and political statement, and as a gesture of solidarity with Chinese social mores amid enduring anti-Qing sentiment. The details within the two-acre walled retreat reflect the Qianlong Emperor's affinity for Chinese culture, and his decorative, architectural, and landscaping tastes, as well as his intentions for China.

Despite the Qianlong Emperor never having moved into his retirement suites, they were not damaged by other inhabitants or looters in the intervening centuries; "the garden has remained virtually unchanged since its initial construction, thanks in no small measure to the emperor's decree that the site not be altered by future generations, the eighteenth-century equivalent of a landmarks preservation law."

== Restoration ==
The Qianlong Garden is currently undergoing restoration in a new partnership between the Palace Museum in Beijing and the New York-based World Monuments Fund. To tackle the myriad challenges of such a unique restoration, including assessing the Qianlong Emperor's idiosyncratic mixture of Han, Manchu, and European materials and techniques and battling centuries of dust and decay, the project brought together the (American) WMF's "well-practiced conservation techniques" and Chinese experts' "deep understanding of the Qianlong Emperor's architectural tastes and decorative predilections. The supporting cast includes aging artisans whose rarefied skills somehow survived the Cultural Revolution, when traditional craftsmanship was considered bourgeois and worthy of punishment." The partnership's "slavishly faithful restoration" of the first suite completed, the Juanqinzhai, is "somewhat of a milestone" in China, where, according to The New York Times, "historic preservation usually entails razing a structure and replacing it with a brightly painted replica."

Beijing's China Daily lauded the achievements of the Juanqinzhai, and reported that "The results have been so successful that the WMF, a private, non-profit New York-based preservation group, has extended its alliance with Chinese cultural officials to restore the Qianlong Garden's 26 other buildings and four courtyards." The Chinese have contributed an additional US$5 million to extend the project. The entire US$18 million, long-term restoration of the Qianlong Garden was initially slated to end in 2017, but now is expected to finish in 2019, in time for the Forbidden City's 600th anniversary in 2020.

As Qianlong Garden was built in the 1770s. With the help of a collaborative effort between the museum and the World Monument Fund, this led to a successful 25 year renovation that started in 2000 and has been officially finished in early September of 2025. major renovation work started in 2002 after the State Council, China's cabinet, announced an initiative during an on-site meeting, which led to the start of. This was an important movement for China as it was a message to show people that even as history is in the past we still work hard to keep it alive. As they believe that the experiences of restoring the Qianlong Garden helps conserve Qing Dynasty architecture across China.

== Inside the Qianlong Garden ==
Inside the decorative walls are 27 structures, though the WMF lists 24 sites on its restoration map, including apartments, pavilions, gates and more.

1. Lodge of Retirement – Juanqinzhai (倦勤斋)	2. Gate of Truth and Compliance
3. Room of Bamboo Fragrance	4. Chamber Heart Partition
5. Building of Wish and Reality	6. Pavilion of Jade Purity
7. Pavilion of the Green-Jade Conch Shell	8. Building of Cloud Light
9. Pavilion of Appreciating Lush Scenery	10. Pavilion of Lofty Beauty
11. Pavilion of Extended Delight	12. Pavilion of the Three Friends
13. Hall of Fulfillment of Original Wishes	14. Exhibition and Tourist Services
15. Floral Pendant Gate	16. Hall of Glorious Dawn
17. Pavilion of Ancient Flowers	18. Terrace of Collecting Morning Dew
19. Pavilion of Ceremony of Purification	20. Cup Floating Stream
21. Pavilion of Practicing Inner Restraint	22. Square Pavilion
23. Pavilion of Picking Fragrances	24. Gate of Spreading Happiness

As restoration continues, more of the buildings of the Qianlong Garden are expected to be opened to the public for study and tours. As of 2012, few have studied the apartments of the Qianlong Emperor's retreat, aside from the Juanqinzhai in the Palace's fourth courtyard, where restoration began in 2007.

=== Juanqinzhai ===
The first of the Qianlong Garden apartments to be restored, the emperor's Juanqinzhai (倦勤斋), "retirement lodge" or literally, "Studio of Exhaustion From Diligent Service", was completed in 2010 after a US$3 million effort by Beijing's Palace Museum and the American-sponsored World Monuments Fund (WMF). The Juanqinzhai, accompanied by about 100 exquisite Qianlong era artifacts, "sumptuous murals, furniture, architectural elements, Buddhist icons, and decorative arts—almost all of which have never before been seen publicly," began a tour of the United States in fall 2010. The 1.5-million-yuan (US$220,807) exhibition was first organized and debuted at the Peabody Essex Museum, in Salem, Massachusetts, then in 2011 had stints at the Metropolitan Museum of Art in New York, and finally, at the Milwaukee Art Museum in Milwaukee, Wisconsin.

The Juanqinzhai is now regarded as one of the only surviving examples of 18th-century Chinese interior design: "only the successive residential palaces of the Qianlong Emperor in the Forbidden City can make any claim to preserve many components of an original secular interior of the pre-1840 period."

== See also ==
- Principles for the Conservation of Heritage Sites in China
