= Alisa Sadikova =

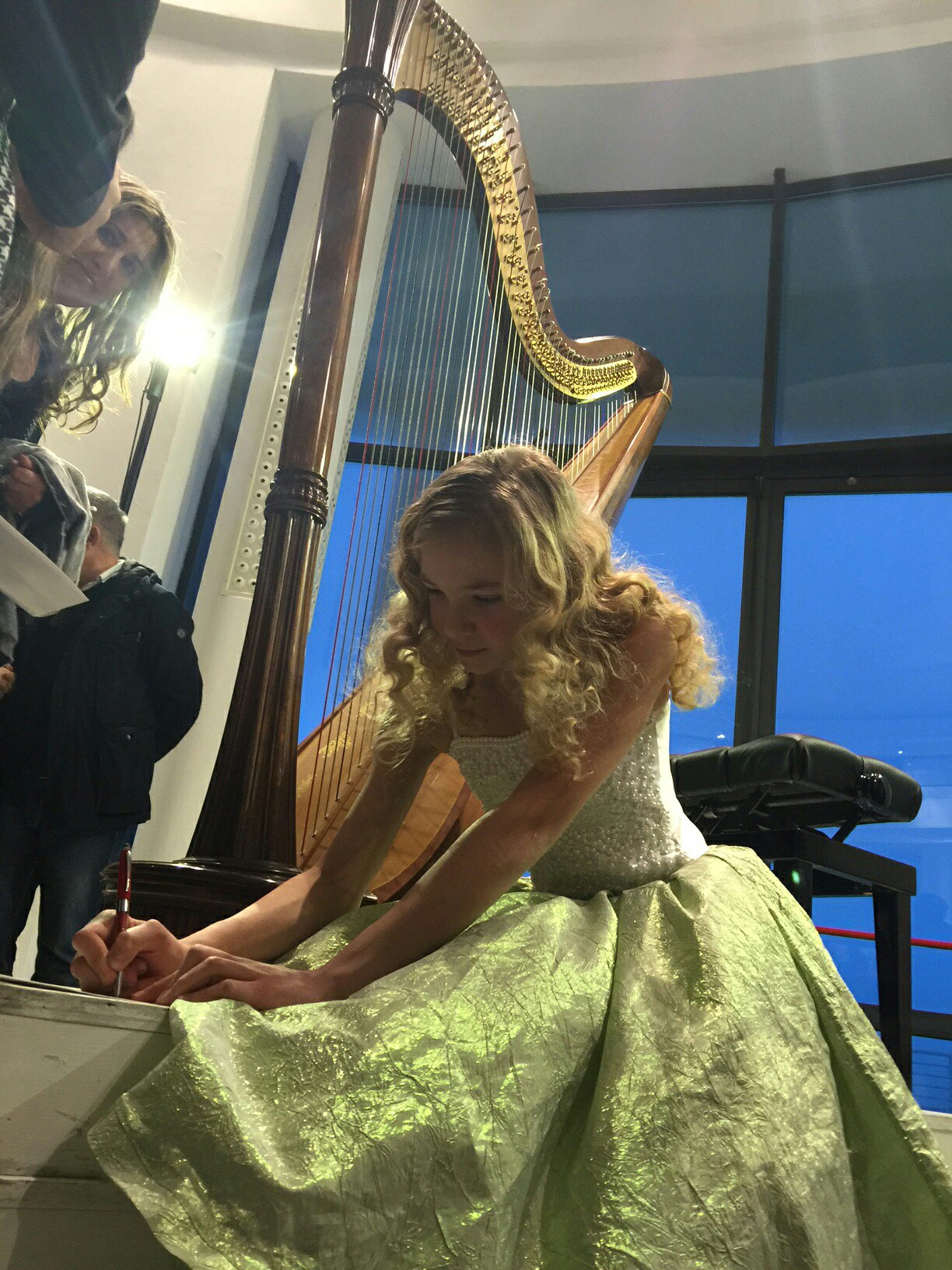
- Sadikova signing autographs (2016)

Background information
- Born: Alisa Sadikova; 30 March 2003 (age 23); Saint Petersburg, Russia
- Genre: Classical music
- Instrument: Harp

Alisa Sadikova (Russian: Алиса Садикова) (born 30 March 2003) is a prodigy classical harpist from Russia.

== Biography ==
Alisa Sadikova was born in Saint Petersburg, Russia.

Harpist and family friend Olga Shevelevich first spotted the young girl's talent when she showed Sadikova a musical piece that the six-year-old started playing right away on the harp. Shevelevich subsequently became her music teacher. From September 2010, Sadikova studied at the Special Music School of Saint Petersburg Conservatory, with Karina Maleeva, under maestro Vladimir Spivakov's sponsorship. From September 2018 to 2021, she attended Musica Mundi High School in Waterloo, Belgium, with Catherine Michel, under The Salvi Foundation's Scholarship. From August 2021 to the present, Alisa Sadikova started her Bachelor's degree at the Juilliard School in New York, USA, with Nancy Allen, under The Guzik Foundation's grant.

Sadikova has two older sisters who are also classical musicians: Svetlana Sadikova who studies violin, and Anna fortepiano. They have a younger brother, Pavel, who studies piano.

In 2010, Alisa Sadikova won the First Prize at the International Youth Competition in New York, and played in the concert of the winners of the competition in Carnegie Hall.

In 2011, she won the First Prize at the international competition for musical talent at Hahnstätten, Germany. In 2012, she was named laureate of maestro Yuri Temirkanov's international foundation for cultural initiatives.

Alisa Sadikova has performed with orchestras, among them the Moscow Virtuosi under Maestro Vladimir Spivakov, with the Symphony orchestra Klangforum Schweiz in Zürich and in Bern, conductor: Sergey Fedoseev; with Symphony orchestra Vienna (Conductor: Leo Wittner); with the Philharmonic Orchestra Gioachino Rossini in Italy (conductor Federico Mondelci), with the International Symphony Orchestra Taurida (conductor Günter Neuhold, Austria), youth chamber orchestra der Jungen Philharmonie Köln in Cologne (artistic director and conductor Volker Hartung); numerous performances with the International youth Symphony orchestra Capella Taurida in Moscow, Saint Petersburg, Baden-Baden (artistic director and conductor M. Golikov); with the Kostroma Symphony orchestra under the conduction of Pavel Gershtein; with the Youth Symphony orchestra of Russia under the leadership of Valitov; the Symphony orchestra of the special music school of the St. Petersburg state Conservatory N. A. Rimsky-Korsakov (artistic director and conductor of the honored artist of Russia—Arkady Steinlucht).

In 2014, Sadikova represented Russia in the World Harp Congress in Sydney, Australia.

In February 2016, she has a solo concert at the Elena Obraztsova Cultural Center, St. Petersburg. In March, there were two solo concerts in Italy and she also played in Italy with the Philharmonic Orchestra Gioachino Rossini (conductor Federico Mondelci, Italy). In April she performed in Saint Petersburg with the International Symphony Orchestra Taurida (conductor Günter Neuhold, Austria).

August–September 2016—participation in the project dedicated to Michael Jackson. October 2016—speech at the opening of the harp festival in Marseille, France. December 2016—performance at the Vienna State Opera.

February 2017—performance at the Norwegian Academy of music in Oslo, Norway.

In May 2017, Sadikova participated the 25th film festival Vivat Cinema of Russia and walked the red carpet together with the director Irina Taimanova.

In June 2017, Sadikova had a performance in the 13th World Harp Congress in Hong Kong.

From November to December 2017 Alisa participated the show Royal Christmas Gala with Sarah Brightman and Gregorian. They had 25 concerts in more than 10 European countries.

In January 2018, she performed at the Saint-Petersburg Philharmonia Grand Hall with Polina Osetinskaya and Kseniya Rappoport.

In March and April 2018, she had five solo concerts in Paris, Tel Aviv (2 concerts) and Vologda (2 concerts).

April 2018 — participation in the concert in M. Gorky Palace of Culture with Farukh Ruzimatov.

June 2018 — in Barcelona Sadikova had a solo concert and participated the Nino Rota Festival.

July 2018 — Alisa participated the Festival Musica Mundi in Belgium.

October 2018 took the Fourth Price at the XX International Harp Competition in Israel.

Regularly performed at Alice Tully Hall, New York.

Alisa Sadikova is the winner of the award and nominal grant of the Naum Guzik Foundation, California, USA (2021, 2022, 2023) for outstanding abilities and high achievements in the field of musical creativity (2021, 2022, 2023).

Alisa Sadikova is the official representative and an endorser of the Salvi Foundation.

Alisa Sadikova recorded five CDs (in Germany, Russia and France), a new solo Album “Harp Constellation” was released in 2023.

Currently, Alisa is actively participating in competitions, festivals, concerts and gives solo recitals in Europe, Asia and USA. Her YouTube videos get millions of views.

Sadikova has performed as a solo artist at such prestigious venues as Carnegie Hall, New York, in a Large and Small halls of the Tonhalle in Zürich, the Large and Small halls of Saint-Petersburg's academic Philharmonic, at Moscow International House of Music, in the concert hall of Kurhaus in Baden-Baden, in the Grand hall of Saint Petersburg's Conservatory of Nikolai Rimsky-Korsakov, as well as numerous performances in Germany (Düsseldorf, Cologne and Limburg), performances of Prague, in The Hague; at Moscow festival Harp art of Russia, and Russian Academy of Music, on the stage of the St. Petersburg state Conservatory (Academy) of N. Rimsky-Korsakov, in the Palace of Grand Duke Vladimir Alexandrovich (House of Scientists), participated in a solemn award ceremony of Ludvig Nobel, in Musik und Kongresshalle, Lübeck, Germany; Tempodrom, Berlin, Germany; Kuppelsaal, Hanover, Germany; König-Pilsener-Arena, Oberhausen, Germany; Messe Erfurt, Erfurt, Germany; Mehr! Theater am Großmarkt, Hamburg; Liederhalle, Frankfurt, Germany; Liederhalle, Mozartsaal, Stuttgart; Philharmonie, Munich; Concert hall Kurhaus, Baden-Baden, Germany; Samsung Hall, Dübendorf, Switzerland, Zurich; Výstaviště Praha Holešovice, Prague, Czech Republic; Atlas Arena, Łódź, Poland; Papp László Sportaréna, Budapest, Hungary; Arena Zagreb, Zagreb, Croatia; Arena Stožice, Ljubljana, Slovenia; Wiener Stadthalle - Halle F, Vienna, Austria; Kongress Centre, Aalborg, Denmark; Hartwall Areena, Helsinki, Finland; Crocus City Hall, Moscow, Russia; Ledovy Dvorets, Saint Petersburg, Russia; Žalgiris Arena, Kaunas, Lithuania; Arēna Rīga, Riga, Latvia; Dvorets Respubliki, Minsk, Belarus.
