= Dreamchaser World Tour =

2013–14 concert tour by Sarah Brightman

- Tour by Sarah Brightman
- Promotional poster for tour
- Location: Asia; Europe; North America; South America
- Associated album: Dreamchaser
- Start date: 16 June 2013
- End date: 14 December 2014
- No. of shows: 106

Sarah Brightman concert chronology
- Sarah Brightman in Concert with Orchestra (2010); Dreamchaser World Tour (2013–2014); Gala: An Evening with Sarah Brightman (2016)

The Dreamchaser World Tour was the fifth worldwide concert tour by English soprano singer Sarah Brightman in support of her album Dreamchaser (2013). The North American tour had been planned to begin in early 2013, but all dates were rescheduled for late 2013. The tour was supposed to be Brightman's final concert tour before her trip into space (which the Dreamchaser album is based on) but the trip was later cancelled for personal reasons.

The 2013 North American leg of Brightman's "Dreamchaser" tour consisted of her performing 86 shows over a seven-month time span. It has been her longest tour since the Harem World Tour in 2004, and it was also her worldwide tour with more dates in Asia and South America. Brightman also added dates in countries where she had never performed before, such as United Arab Emirates and Qatar.

In April 2014, a second leg of the North American tour was announced for the summer season; however, on 18 June 2014, Brightman cancelled the summer dates after sustaining an ankle injury. The remainder of the tour ultimately resumed in November 2014, coming to an end a month later.

== Production ==
Brightman performing her Dreamchaser World Tour in Buenos Aires, Argentina

Brightman anticipated that the tour would be simple; the usual orchestra that accompanied her on previous tours was reduced to four musicians (a guitarist, a pianist, a drummer and a keyboard). The number of dancers was also reduced from being a large number to only two.

The scenery of the stage consisted of a huge screen with tri-dimensional images and videos from space, light, and nature. A raising platform at center of the stage was used by Brightman on several stages of the show. She was joined by Erkan Aki, a Swiss tenor, for singing "Canto della Terra" and "The Phantom of The Opera". During the show, Brightman made ten changes of clothes.

The show lasted two hours with an interlude of twenty minutes, and the track list (plus the encore) had nineteen tracks. The track list of the tour consisted of her well-known songs plus new ones from the Dreamchaser album. As the concert was space-themed, it included various songs from the 2000 album La Luna, which also had a theme related to space.

== Set lists ==
2013 and early 2014 set list

1. Angel
2. One Day Like This
3. Glósóli
4. Hijo de la Luna
5. La Luna
6. Eperdu
7. It's a Beautiful Day
8. Ave Maria
9. Canto della Terra (with Erkan Aki)
10. Nessun Dorma

Intermission

1. Closer
2. Breathe Me
3. Figlio Perduto
4. Kaze no Toorimichi
5. Scarborough Fair
6. A Song of India
7. The Phantom of the Opera (with Erkan Aki)
8. Time to Say Goodbye
9. Venus and Mars
10. A Question of Honour

Late 2014 (Europe second leg & Asia third Leg) set list

1. Sanvean Instrumental
2. Gothica
3. Fleurs du Mal
4. Symphony
5. Who Wants to Live Forever
6. Sarahbande Interlude
7. Anytime Anywhere
8. Eperdu
9. Hijo de la Luna
10. La Luna
11. It's a Beautiful Day
12. Canto della Terra (with Erkan Aki)
13. Nessun Dorma
14. Closer Instrumental
15. Harem
16. Breathe Me
17. Figlio Perduto
18. Scarborough Fair
19. A Song of India
20. The Phantom of the Opera (with Erkan Aki)
21. Time to Say Goodbye
22. A Question of Honour
23. Dust in the Wind

Notes

- "Kaze no Toorimichi" was not performed during the shows in China.
- "Deliver Me" was performed as the second encore at the concert taping in London for the PBS special and in the premiere concert in Guangzhou.
- "Dust in the Wind" was replaced by "I Believe in Father Christmas" in late December 2014.

== Personnel ==
The performances were directed by director Anthony Van Laast, who worked in Brightman's previous Symphony: Live in Vienna show. The band and dancers comprise some of the world's most respected session musicians and performers. Band:

- Peter Murray – musical director, keys, piano
- Mark Pusey – drums & percussion
- Olli Cunningham – keys, synths
- Gunther Laudahn – guitars, harps, glockenspiel

Dancers:

- Jennifer White
- Gemma Payne

Guest vocalist:

- Erkan Aki

== Critical reception ==
Professional ratings
Review scores
Source	Rating
Times Colonist	3.5/5 stars

The "Dreamchaser World Tour" received generally positive reviews from critics. The Gazette congratulated Brightman as she dealt with such a small band yet was able to maintain the "majestic mystery" of the performance. The Atlanta Music Scene also reviewed positively the simplicity of the production; "It was the simpler moments when Brightman truly sparkled". Blogcritic.org identified the lightning show as "stunning".

On the review by Twincities.com, the Dreamchaser Tour was described as "enchanting, yet odd", "all the while, stunning". Times Colonist reviewer, Mike Delvin rated Brightman's show with 3.5 stars and wrote: "The show was a spectacle, and the singing was anything but secondary". Buffalo News, in contrast, recognized the purity of Brightman's voice but expected a better elaborated concert. Although many congratulated the simplicity of the performance, other reviews criticized Brightman; Randy Cordova, in azcentral wrote that the show "lacked the outlandish sense of spectacle for which she is known." and compared negatively the simplicity of this tour with the elaboration of the previous. Postcity also criticized Brightman by stating: "All in all, Brightman made terrific use of her high-end stage show, all the while serving up a vocal performance that was just good enough so as not to get completely overshadowed".

== Tour dates ==
List of 2013 concerts
Date	City	Country	Venue	Gross revenue
16 June 2013	Guangzhou	China	Guangzhou Sports Arena	
19 June 2013	Nanning	China	Guangxi Gymnasium	
21 June 2013	Shenzhen	China	Bay Sports Center Gymnasium	
23 June 2013	Shanghai	China	Shanghai Grand Stage	
25 June 2013	Hangzhou	China	Yellow Dragon Gymnasium	
28 June 2013	Beijing	China	MasterCard Center	
1 July 2013	Tokyo	Japan	Tokyo International Forum	
2 July 2013	Tokyo	Japan	Tokyo International Forum	
4 July 2013	Tokyo	Japan	Tokyo International Forum	
5 July 2013	Tokyo	Japan	Tokyo International Forum	
7 July 2013	Yokohama	Japan	National Convention Hall	
9 July 2013	Nagoya	Japan	Nippon Gaishi Hall	
11 July 2013	Tokyo	Japan	Tokyo International Forum	
12 July 2013	Tokyo	Japan	Tokyo International Forum	
14 July 2013	Ishikawa	Japan	Sogo Sports Center	
16 July 2013	Hiroshima	Japan	Hiroshima Sun Plaza	
18 July 2013	Osaka	Japan	Osaka-Jo Hall	
21 July 2013	Busan	South Korea	BEXCO Auditorium	
23 July 2013	Gwangju	South Korea	KimDaejoong Convention Center	
24 July 2013	Daegu	South Korea	EXCO Convention Center	
26 July 2013	Seoul	South Korea	Olympic Gymnastics Arena	
31 July 2013	Bangkok	Thailand	BITEC Arena	
13 September 2013	Hamilton	Canada	Copps Coliseum	
14 September 2013	Ottawa	Canada	Canadian Tire Centre	
15 September 2013	Toronto	Canada	Air Canada Centre	$474,864
17 September 2013	Montreal	Canada	Bell Centre	$342,542
18 September 2013	Boston	United States	Boston Opera House	
20 September 2013	Baltimore	United States	Modell Performing Arts Center	
21 September 2013	New York City	United States	Radio City Music Hall	$703,875
22 September 2013	Bethlehem	United States	Sands Bethlehem Event Center	
24 September 2013	Hartford	United States	Mortensen Hall	
25 September 2013	Buffalo	United States	Mainstage Theatre	
27 September 2013	Detroit	United States	Fox Theatre	$281,216
28 September 2013	Rosemont	United States	Akoo Theatre	
29 September 2013	Milwaukee	United States	Riverside Theater	
1 October 2013	Akron	United States	E.J. Thomas Hall	
2 October 2013	Cincinnati	United States	Procter and Gamble Hall	
5 October 2013	Sunrise	United States	BB&T Center	
6 October 2013	Tampa	United States	Tampa Bay Times Forum	
8 October 2013	Orlando	United States	Amway Center	$313,550
9 October 2013	Atlanta	United States	Fox Theatre	$350,345
11 October 2013	Houston	United States	Bayou Music Center	
12 October 2013	Grand Prairie	United States	Verizon Theatre at Grand Prairie	$244,723
13 October 2013	Tulsa	United States	BOK Center	$179,246
17 October 2013	Saint Paul	United States	Xcel Energy Center	
19 October 2013	Winnipeg	Canada	MTS Centre	
21 October 2013	Calgary	Canada	Scotiabank Saddledome	
22 October 2013	Edmonton	Canada	Rexall Place	
24 October 2013	Victoria	Canada	Save-On-Foods Memorial Centre	
25 October 2013	Vancouver	Canada	Rogers Arena	
26 October 2013	Seattle	United States	Paramount Theatre	
28 October 2013	San Jose	United States	SAP Center	
30 October 2013	Phoenix	United States	Comerica Theatre	
1 November 2013	Los Angeles	United States	Dolby Theatre	
2 November 2013	Anaheim	United States	Honda Center	
7 November 2013	Monterrey	Mexico	Arena Monterrey	
9 November 2013	Puebla City	Mexico	Auditorio Siglo XXI	
11 November 2013	Zapopan	Mexico	Telmex Auditorium	$629,744
12 November 2013	Mexico City	Mexico	Arena Ciudad de México	
13 November 2013	Mexico City	Mexico	Arena Ciudad de México	
19 November 2013	Santiago	Chile	Movistar Arena	
21 November 2013	Buenos Aires	Argentina	Luna Park	
22 November 2013	Buenos Aires	Argentina	Luna Park	
24 November 2013	Porto Alegre	Brazil	Teatro Do Sesi	$206,842
26 November 2013	Curitiba	Brazil	Teatro Positivo	$221,797
28 November 2013	São Paulo	Brazil	Credicard Hall	$759,185
29 November 2013	São Paulo	Brazil	Credicard Hall	$759,185
1 December 2013	Rio de Janeiro	Brazil	Citibank Hall	$266,806
3 December 2013	Belo Horizonte	Brazil	Chevrolet Hall	$177,542

List of 2013 concerts
Date	City	Country	Venue	Gross revenue
11 January 2014	Nanjing	China	Olympic Sports Centre	
15 January 2014	Changzhou	China	Changzhou Olympic Sports Centre	
17 January 2014	Fuzhou	China	Fuzhou Stadium	
19 January 2014	Beijing	China	Great Hall of the People	
21 January 2014	Shanghai	China	Shanghai Grand Stage	
23 January 2014	Chek Lap Kok	Hong Kong	AsiaWorld–Arena	
6 February 2014	Dubai	United Arab Emirates	Dubai World Trade Centre	
7 February 2014	Dubai	United Arab Emirates	Dubai World Trade Centre	
9 February 2014	Doha	Qatar	National Convention Center	
12 February 2014	Odesa	Ukraine	Odesa Opera and Ballet Theater	
14 February 2014	Kyiv	Ukraine	Palace "Ukraine"	
16 February 2014	Moscow	Russia	Crocus City Hall	
18 February 2014	St. Petersburg	Russia	Ice Palace	
20 February 2014	Riga	Latvia	Arena Riga	
22 February 2014	Kaunas	Lithuania	Žalgiris Arena	
24 February 2014	Helsinki	Finland	Hartwall Arena	
26 February 2014	Stockholm	Sweden	Hovet Arena	
9 November 2014	Istanbul	Turkey	Ülker Sports Arena	
12 November 2014	Sofia	Bulgaria	Armeets Arena	
13 November 2014	Bucharest	Romania	Sala Palatului	
15 November 2014	Ekaterinburg	Russia	Palace Sport	
17 November 2014	Moscow	Russia	Crocus City Hall	
19 November 2014	St. Petersburg	Russia	Oktyabrskiy Big Concert Hall	
21 November 2014	Tallinn	Estonia	Saku Suurhall	
23 November 2014	Riga	Latvia	Arena Riga	
29 November 2014	Sapporo	Japan	Hokkai Kitayell	
1 December 2014	Tokyo	Japan	Tokyo International Forum	
2 December 2014	Osaka	Japan	Osaka-Jo Hall	
4 December 2014	Hiroshima	Japan	Sun Plaza Hall	
5 December 2014	Nagoya	Japan	Aichi Prefectural Gymnasium	
7 December 2014	Sendai	Japan	Sekisui Heim Super Arena	
8 December 2014	Tokyo	Japan	Tokyo International Forum	
9 December 2014	Yokohama	Japan	Pacifico Yokohama	
11 December 2014	Tokyo	Japan	Tokyo International Forum	
12 December 2014	Tokyo	Japan	Tokyo International Forum	
14 December 2014	Taipei	Taiwan	Taipei Arena	
