= Narcis Iustin Ianău =

Romanian classical singer (born 1995)

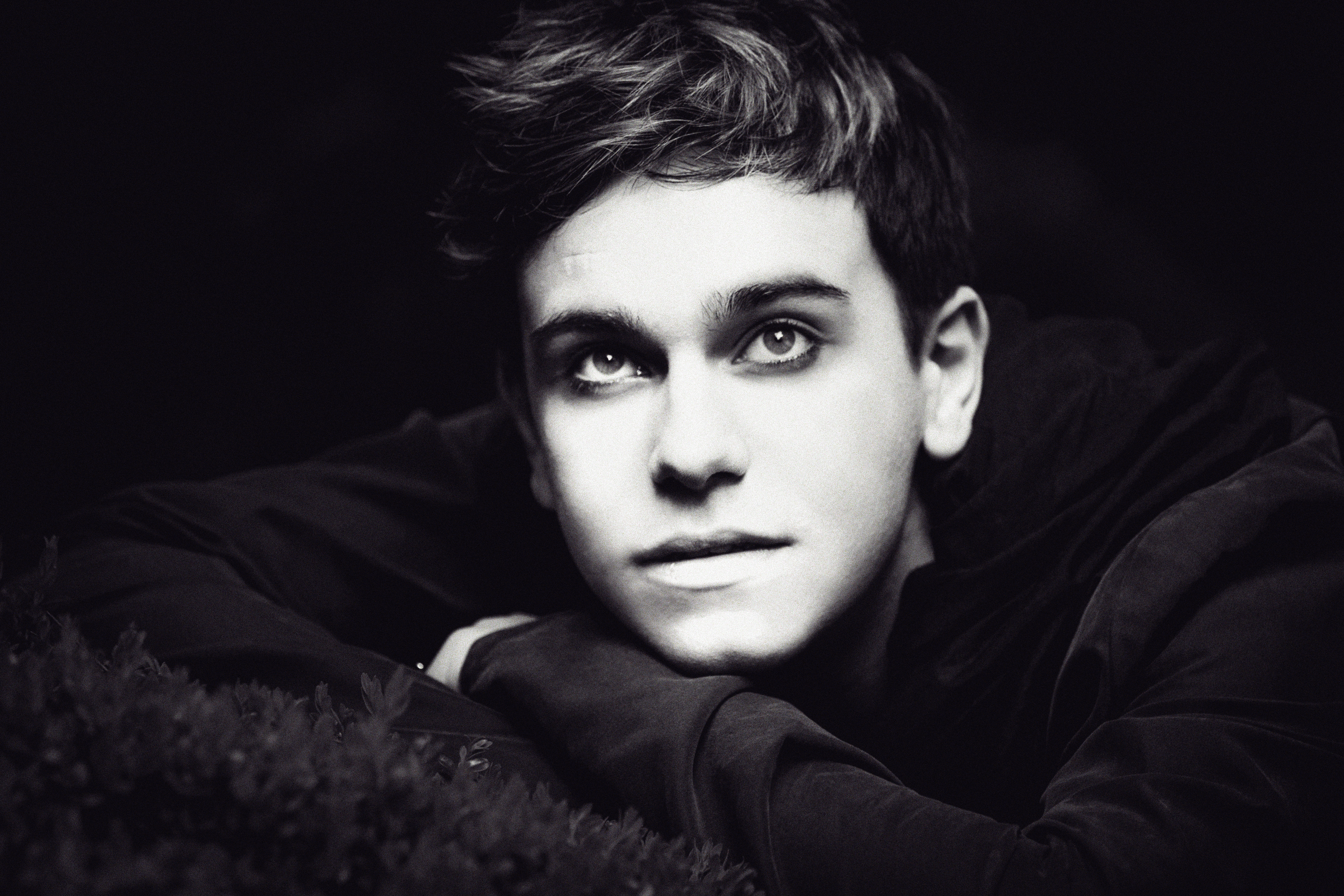
- Narcis Iustin Ianău, 2009
- Born: February 24, 1995 (age 30); Bacău, Romania
- Years active: 2011–present
- Musical career
- Website: www.narcis-music.com

Narcis Iustin Ianău (Romanian pronunciation: [ˈnart͡ʃis jusˈtin jaˈnəw]; born February 24, 1995, in Bacău, Romania) is a Romanian classical singer. In Romania he became famous by taking part in the first season of Românii au talent and becoming the runner-up.

== Childhood and youth ==
Narcis was born on February 24, 1995, in Barați, Bacău as the son of Eduard and Felicia Ianău. At the age of five he began singing in the Catholic church choir in his hometown. There his teacher put him in the group of the sopranists. After graduating the Liceul de Artă "George Apostu" (Secondary school of arts "George Apostu"), Narcis started studying at the Academia de Muzică "Gheorghe Dima" (Music academy "Gheorge Dima") in Cluj-Napoca.

== Career ==
=== Românii au talent and Io canto ===
In 2010, Narcis competed for the first season of Românii au talent. In the audition he interpreted O mio babbino caro, taken from the opera Gianni Schicchi by Giacomo Puccini. With the agreement of all three judges Narcis made it to the semifinal, where he presented Adagio by Tomaso Albinoni and was voted into the final. On April 25, 2011, he interpreted an own version of an aria of The Phantom of the Opera in the final. With 24.40% of all votes he became the runner-up of this competition.

Still in 2011, Narcis took part as a special guest in the Italian TV-show Io canto, in which adolescents compete in singing songs with the objective of gaining ground in music business.

One year later, Narcis got invited as liveact to the semifinal of the second season of Românii au talent, where he interpreted Scarborough Fair.

=== Romanian National opera, Cluj-Napoca ===
In January, 2015, Narcis debuted in the Opera Română din Cluj (Romanian National Opera, Cluj-Napoca) by playing the herdsman in Tosca, an opera by Giacomo Puccini.

=== Working with Gregorian ===
Since 2013, Narcis has been working together with Gregorian, a German band of mainly English, classically educated singers who present Gregorian chant-inspired versions of pop and rock songs. The first album together with Narcis was released in 2013 by the title of Masters of Chant Chapter 9. On this album he sang the song Gloria, written and originally performed by German singer-songwriter Joachim Witt. One year later, the next album Winter Chants was released with the common songs Jesu Joy Of Man's Desiring and Ave Maria. In 2015, Gregorian released their last album for now, Masters of Chant: The Final Chapter, again in cooperation with Narcis by singing the song Cry Softly. On February 25, 2016, he and Gregorian competed in Unser Lied für Stockholm, the German preliminary decision for the Eurovision Song Contest 2016. They achieved fifth place. From the beginning until the middle of 2016, Narcis was with Gregorian on their good-bye tour, Masters Of Chants - The Final Chapter Tournee 2016.

=== On Tour With Sarah Brightman ===
In late 2018 and through 2019, Narcis was on tour with Sarah Brightman on her Hymn: Sarah Brightman In Concert tour.

== Discography ==
=== Masters of Chant-albums with Gregorian ===
- 2013: Masters of Chant Chapter IX
- 2014: Winter Chants
- 2015: Masters Of Chant: The Final Chapter
