= Festspielhaus Neuschwanstein =

Theatre in Füssen, Bavaria, Germany

Coordinates: 47°35′11″N 10°42′31″E

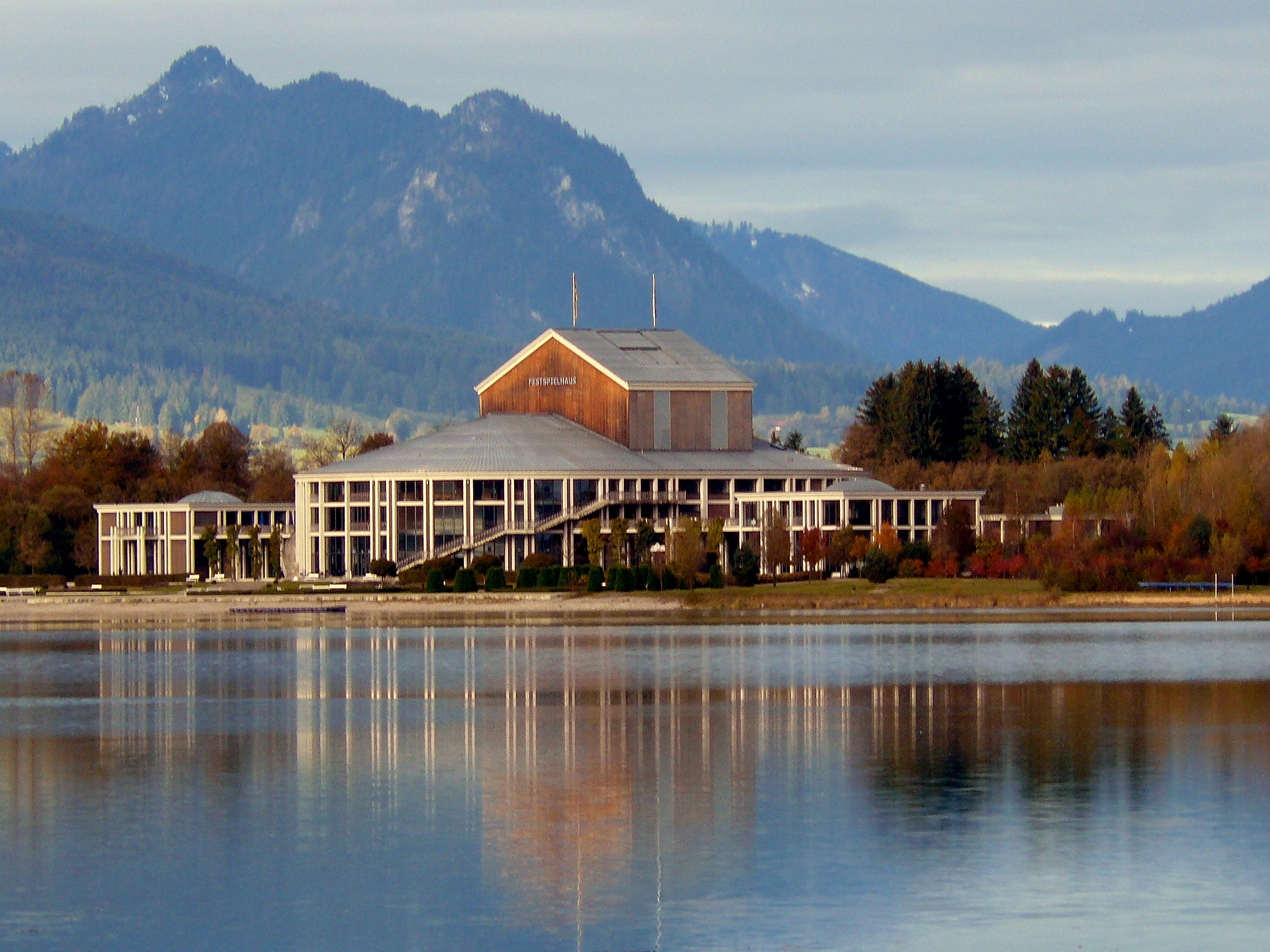
Festspielhaus Neuschwanstein

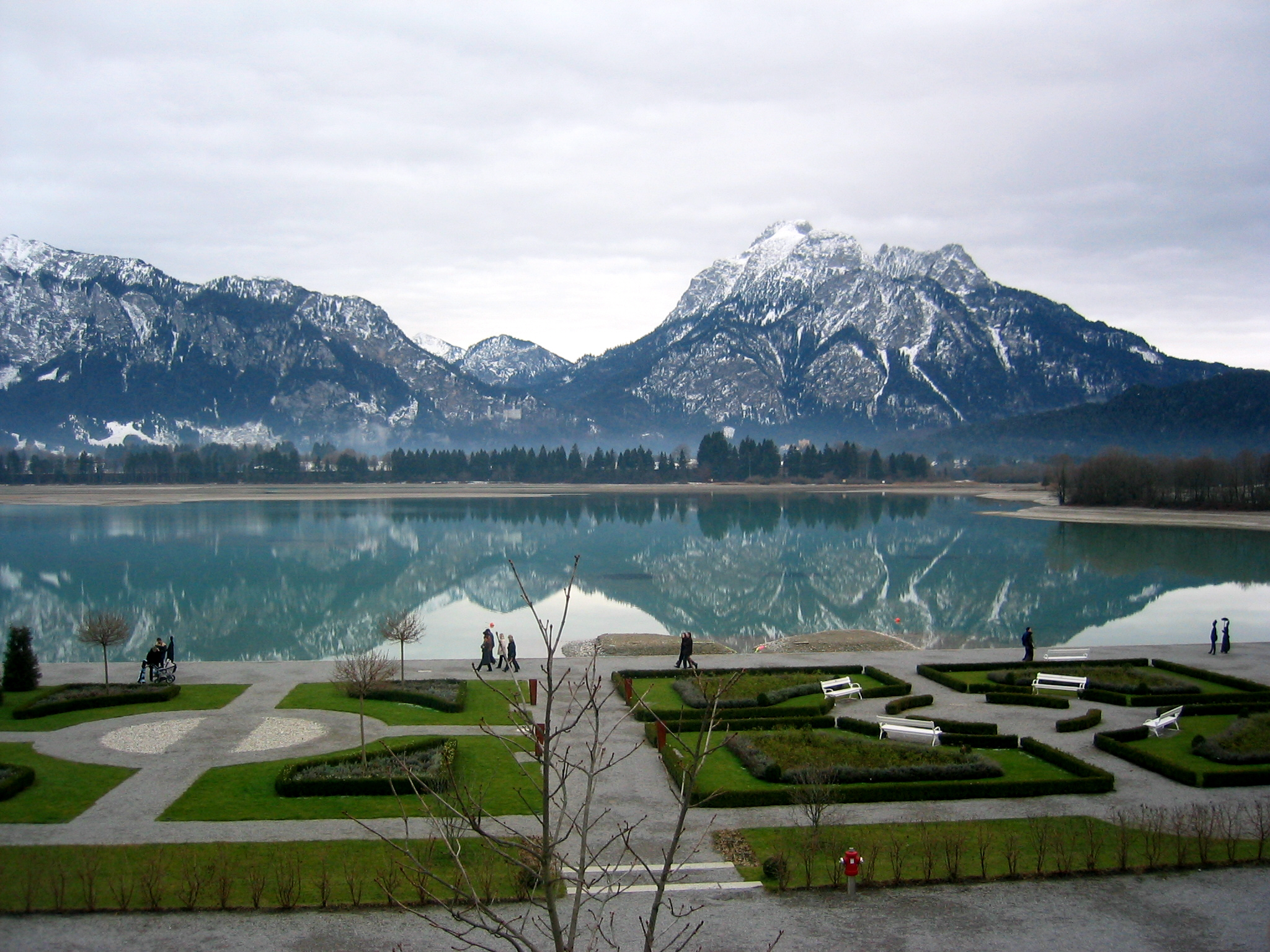
View from the theater's terrace ( Neuschwanstein Castle is visible across the lake)

Festspielhaus Neuschwanstein is a theatre in the town of Füssen in Bavaria, Germany dedicated to musical performances related to King Ludwig II of Bavaria. The theatre is close to the famous Neuschwanstein Castle.
