= Mario Frangoulis =

Mario Frangoulis Μάριος Φραγκούλης
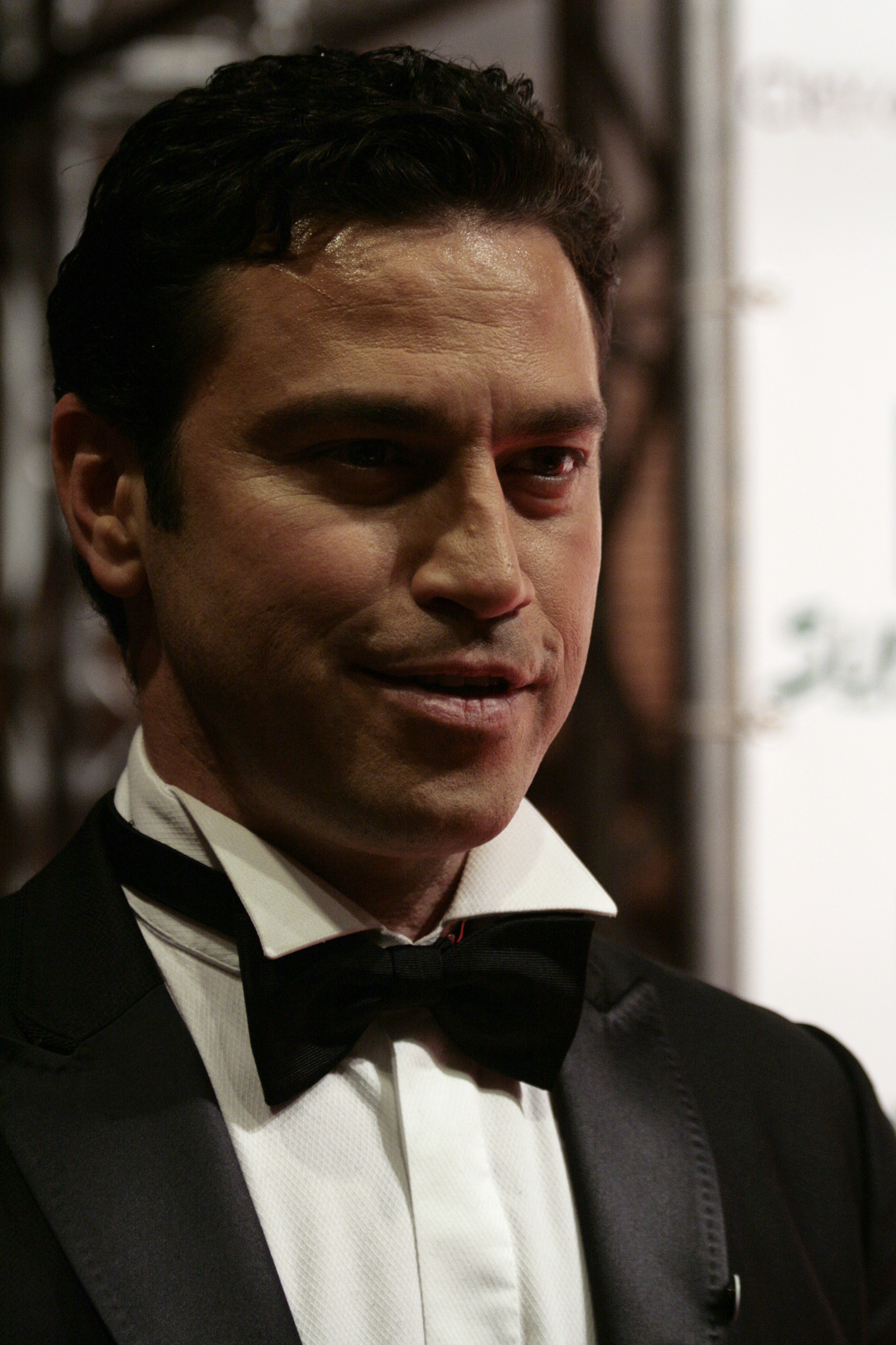

Background information
- Born: 18 December 1966 (age 59); Umtali, Rhodesia (now Zimbabwe)
- Origin: Greece
- Genres: Classical music, operatic pop, opera
- Occupation: Singer
- Instrument: Vocals
- Years active: 1988–present
- Labels: Sony Classical (1998–present); Sony Music Greece (1999–present)

Mario Frangoulis (Greek: Μάριος Φραγκούλης, romanized: Mários Frankoúlis; born 18 December 1966 ) is a Greek opera singer and actor, famous for his refined tenor vocals. Born in Rhodesia, Frangoulis after his three-decade long career has established himself as a critically and commercially acclaimed recording artist and vocal performer in Greece and neighbouring countries. His initial rise to international prominence came with his hit song "Vincerò, Perderò" and his rendition of the song "Nights in White Satin".

Discovered by Sir Cameron Mackintosh, Frangoulis has made his official theatre debut as Marius Pontmercy in Les Misérables, and later performed in The Phantom of the Opera and the rendition of Grease. He has recorded songs in Italian, Spanish, English, French, and Greek, and is fluent in all five languages.

== Biography ==
=== Early life ===
Frangoulis was born on 18 December 1966 in Rhodesia (now Zimbabwe). When he was four years old he was sent to Athens, Greece to live with his maternal aunt Loula and her husband George. The couple adored him and Frangoulis considered them as his parents. At the age of eight Frangoulis began singing in various choirs, and at the age of eleven he played the part of Issachar in a school production of Andrew Lloyd Webber's Joseph and the Amazing Technicolor Dreamcoat. Other school theatrical performances included the Master of Ceremonies in Cabaret, and Tony in West Side Story.

=== Musical and theatrical studies ===
When Frangoulis was six years old, he started violin lessons, which he continued for twelve years, receiving a first prize when he was as young as fourteen. He graduated from the Conservatory in 1984, and although he did not further his violin studies, this particular musical training assisted Frangoulis with his operatic studies later in life.

Frangoulis studied acting at the Guildhall School of Music and Drama in London. In 1988, during his final year, he played Puck in A Midsummer Night's Dream, a production in collaboration with the Royal Shakespeare Company for the Arundel Festival. Frangoulis played the lead in the James McConnel/Kit Hesketh-Harvey musical Orlando, where he was spotted by Cameron Mackintosh who after an audition offered him the part of Marius in the West End production of Les Misérables at the Palace Theatre (1988–1989) under the direction of Trevor Nunn. Also in 1989, Frangoulis, who had never studied classical singing, received the Maria Callas Scholarship for Opera. After finishing Les Misérables, Frangoulis moved to Italy where he studied with tenor Carlo Bergonzi at the Verdi Academy in Busseto, graduating six months later.

After a successful audition with conductor Nicola Rescigno and the renowned tenor Alfredo Kraus, Frangoulis moved to Rome in 1990 and became Kraus's first private student, traveling with him around the world to study vocal techniques and repertory.

=== Career and further studies ===
==== 1990 to 1995 ====
In 1991, Frangoulis was invited by Andrew Lloyd Webber to star as Raoul in Phantom of the Opera at Her Majesty's Theater. The same year, he appeared alongside Montserrat Caballé, Samuel Ramey and the British Youth Opera in the charity gala "Serenade to a Princess" at the Whitehall Palace, celebrating the birthday of Diana, Princess of Wales.

In 1992, Frangoulis moved to The United States to continue his operatic studies. With his mentor's Marilyn Horne, suggestion and with the help of the Onassis Scholarship, he completed a three-year long program of vocal courses at the Juilliard School of Music, in New York City as well as studying with soprano Dodi Protero. In 1992, Frangoulis also traveled to Liverpool, where he performed in an Opera Gala celebrating the 500th anniversary of the discovery of America, hosted by Sir Peter Ustinov. Appearing artists for this event were as well: Montserrat Caballé, Dmitri Hvorostowski, Julia Migenes-Johnson, Dennis O'Neil, Rita Hunter and the late Alfredo Kraus, with the Royal Liverpool Philharmonic Orchestra and chorus conducted by Robin Stapleton, in the presence of His Majesty Juan Carlos of Spain and HM Queen Sophia, and HRH Prince Andrew of England.

In the summer of the same year, along with stars of the Greek National Opera, he sang at the Athens Concert Hall in an opera gala dedicated to the memory of Maria Callas. In the summer of 1993, Frangoulis returned to the role of Marius as he starred in a touring cast of Les Misérables, at the Point Theatre in Dublin, Ireland. In 1994 he was the first Greek to become a finalist in the Luciano Pavarotti International Competition.

=== Career ===
==== 1995 ====
In 1995, Frangoulis returned to London to play the role of Lun-Tha in the Rodgers and Hammerstein musical The King and I during the Covent Garden Festival. This highly acclaimed performance received great comments from a number of newspapers including the Times and The Guardian. He also sang the title role in the musical Yusupov in Oxford as well as Johnny in "Sail away" (Savoy theatre in London). In 1995 he participated in the recording of Bernard J. Taylor's rock opera Nosferatu the Vampire. He also sang as a Les Misérables alumnus in the Tenth Anniversary Concert of the show at the Royal Albert Hall.

==== 1996 ====
In the summer of 1996, Frangoulis made his debut at the theater of Herodes Atticus, by the Acropolis, in an evening dedicated to the great memory of Leonard Bernstein, with the Orchestra of Colours ( a symphony orchestra created by Greek composer Manos Hatzidakis), singing excerpts from musicals such as West Side Story, Candide, and Our Town.

The following September he returned to the Odeon to play the role of Orpheus in the Orpheus Liturgy, an oratorio that it was broadcast on Greek television. This marked the start of his collaboration with Greek composer Yannis Markopoulos – also transcribed Giannis Markopoulos. He reprised the role of Lun-Tha in a concert version of the musical with the BBC Symphony Orchestra conducted by Wally Harper, with Barbara Cook and his 1996 return to the London cast of Les Misérables.

==== 1997–1998 ====
In February 1997, due to his mother's serious illness, Frangoulis returned to Greece. There he joined Athens theatrical scene, notably through his playing Billy Kracker in Kurt Weill's Happy End with the Karolos Koun Art Theater, directed by George Lazanis, the Lead Bird in Aristophanes's comedy The Birds, directed once more by George Lazanis which was performed in almost every major ancient amphitheater of Greece, such as Epidaurus, Sparta, Filippoi and many more. In September 1997 he was offered the leading role of Danny Zouko in the musical Grease, directed by David Gilmore. Once more, it was a great success with the Greek media and a great start of Frangoulis's popularity with the Greek public. The same season, he appeared in late night shows in the prestigious music hall "Iera Odos", alongside the Greek star George Dalaras, singing popular Greek, Italian and Spanish songs. This production toured Greece and Europe as well (London, Paris, Brussels, Helsinki, Munchen, Berlin, and Frankfurt) very successfully and it turned out to be the best-selling CD (by EMI Greece), which soon after went platinum. Representatives of Sony Music heard Frangoulis in one of these shows and they arranged him to be introduced to Peter Gelb, the head of Sony Classical. The result of this introduction was, the signing of an exclusive contract for 2 CDs and 3 CDs optional, enabling Frangoulis to start an international recording career at the highest level.

His collaboration with prestigious Greek composers continued with his appearance in the May 1998 Herodes Atticus Theater performance of Mikis Theodorakis's "Axion Esti", a musical rendition of the historic poem "Axion Esti" as well by Nobel prize winner Odysseas Elytis.

==== 1999 ====
In the spring of 1999 he made his first solo show at the Iera Odos Music Hall with songs from all over the world, with the participation of Deborah Meyers.They were an overnight sensation, and these appearances were followed by a hugely successful concert tour in Greece and Cyprus the following summer, playing in various venues of 2.000 – 10.000 audience. His first solo album "Fengari erotevmeno" ("Love stricken moon"), a live recording of the show, a double CD by Sony, Greece (with kind permission of Sony Classical), was an immediate best-seller, thus winning him his second platinum album (both in Greece and Cyprus) in two years. .

==== 2000 ====
In July 2000, Frangoulis was the first Greek tenor to perform at La Scala, in Milan as Tony in West Side Story. In August, he sang the title role in Yannis Markopoulos's Erotokritos at the Herodes Atticus theater, and returned to the same venue, later that month for a solo recital there, to celebrate his ten years anniversary as a professional performer on stage. The repertoire included Greek and international songs. This great production was recorded to a CD and very successfully was toured all over Greece.

Frangoulis was invited by the composer Mikis Theodorakis to perform in the Machi tis kritis concert at the Kallimarmaro amphitheater in a tribute to those who lost their lives in the Battle of Crete.

==== 2001 ====
At the beginning of 2001, Frangoulis took part in a charity opera gala at the Athens Concert Hall, along with stars of the Greek National Opera. That May, he was one of the leading artists in an evening called Viva Verdi, a tribute for the centenary of the composer's death, given at the Novaya Opera of Moscow. This concert also took place in Cyprus the following month. In the summer of 2001 he made his debut in ancient Greek tragedy, played Dionysus in a touring production of Euripides's The Bacchae, also performed at the Herodes Atticus Theater, in Athens. In October of the same year, Frangoulis was one of the leading performers in the international production Bravo China alongside Nana Mouskouri and famous Chinese artists Liu Huan and Huang Ying, at the Herodes Atticus theater where he performed in both Greek and Chinese.

==== 2002 ====
In March 2002, Frangoulis gave a concert with Deborah Myers at the Athens Concert Hall, singing songs from well-known films. In July of the same year he appeared at the Lycabettus Theater in Athens, for the launching of his first international album 'Sometimes I Dream', and in Thessaloniki as well, in a concert with Justin Hayward of The Moody Blues, a performance that included 'Nights in White Satin' This performance was recorded and released on a DVD. In October, Frangoulis began a grand tour around Europe, the US and Asia in order to promote his new album 'Sometimes I Dream'. In November, his new DVD "Sometimes I Dream" was broadcast on PBS in The United States. At the end of the year, Frangoulis appeared with the Greek singer Maria Farantouri, in the Millennium Festivities on New Year's Eve under the Acropolis in Athens.

==== 2003 ====
On 30 January, Frangoulis was invited by the Athens 2004 Olympic Games committee to give a concert at the Athens Olympic Stadium. In March he made his first appearance at the Greek National Opera, where he sang opera arias and duets as well as songs and duets from various musicals with soprano Elena Kelessidou. In June of that year he appeared at the Ulriksdal festival, Stockholm, accompanied by the Swedish Symphonic Orchestra. In August 2003 he performed at the Helsinki Festival.

With the Moscow New Opera soloists, chorus and orchestra, he made a tour of different cities in Russia and Cyprus, singing arias and duets in a concert with sets and costumes, called "Tribute to Maria Callas" in which he interpreted, among others, Verdi's Otello.

==== 2004 ====
On New Year's Eve, Frangoulis welcomed the year of 2004 with the Mayor of Athens in an outdoor performance in Syntagma Square, which was broadcast live all over Greece and by satellite all over the world. Also taking part in that concert were Greek stars Alkistis Protopsalti, Konstantinos Markoulakis, Dimitris Papadimitriou as well as the Gipsy Kings. In April he appeared in an evening of celebration in honor of Danai, a Greek singer very famous in the 1930s, where he sang an unusual repertoire for him, songs by Attic, Hairopoulos, and others. On 11 May, he sang at the Herodes Atticus Theater in a concert for the 550 years of the Great School of the Greeks (a famous Greek institution in Istanbul then Constantinople). The songs were all by Mikis Theodorakis with the Greek Radio Television Symphony Orchestra. The first part included symphonic songs in various languages (Greek, Italian, German, English, French and Chinese) and in the second part, "Axion esti" with Konstantinos Markoulakis as narrator and Frangoulis in the role of the Popular Singer.

On 22 May, at the 57th Cannes Film Festival, he attended the world premiere of the film De-Lovely, based on the life of Cole Porter, and starring Kevin Klein. Frangoulis played the part of Alfred Drake, a Broadway star of the 1960s, and he sang the duet 'So in Love' from Kiss Me, Kate, with Lara Fabian. After the showing of the film, he took part in a concert, with some other artists of the singing cast of the film (Robbie Williams, Nathalie Cole, Elvis Costello, Alanis Morissette, Diana Krall). In July and August, his second foray into the Greek tragedy: the leading role of Achilles in the lost Aeschylus trilogy Achilleis, recently reconstructed from fragments of Aeschylus verses, completed with verses from Homer's "Iliad" in a translation of Ilias Malandris directed by Nikos Haralambous, with the Cyprus Theatrical Organization, with prestigious co-stars such as Despina Bebedelli, Dim. Kafkaridis and Jenny Gaitanopoulou.

In August, Frangoulis also took part in the final concert of the Torch Relay at the Athens Olympic Games. In this event he performed the song 'Here's to the Heroes' for the first time which was shown as part of the UK's BBC Songs of Praise Olympics Special. In 17 September he took part at the Opening Ceremonies of the 2004 Summer Paralympics in a front of more than 70 hundred people at the Athens Olympic Stadium. On 1 October, he deepened his relationship with jazz with an appearance at the Herodes Atticus theater, shared with soprano Barbara Hendrics, singing songs such as "Mack the Knife", "Unforgettable", "When I Fall in Love", "My Baby Just Don't Care for Me" and "Les Feuilles Mortes", "I Get a Kick out of You", Cole Porter's "You're the Top" and "So in Love", finishing with "Ev'ry Time We Say Goodbye". He then flew to Japan where, on 11 October, he gave a concert at the Bunkamura Orchard Hall with the Tokyo City Philharmonic Orchestra conducted by Shuya Okatu and soprano Maki Mori. He sang songs from "Sometimes I Dream", as well as "O Sole Mio", "Granada", excerpts from Theodorakis's Canto General and the "Brindisi" from La traviata. In November, he was in the United Kingdom for eight concerts with soprano Hayley Westenra. In November 2004 Frangoulis's second international album Follow your Heart was released.

==== 2005 ====
During the months of February and March he was in the US for his first American tour of 28 cities with pianist Jim Brickman and Ann Cochran, to promote his album. In April he took a break to give concerts in South Africa (Sun City), with Vicky Sampson. Then he continued his tour visiting Canada, Los Angeles, San Francisco. On 20 May, he gave his first solo concert in the US, at the New York City Center, with guest artist soprano Liza Vroman. This was followed by two other concerts. One at the Meyerhoff Symphony Hall with the Baltimore Symphony Orchestra in Baltimore, Maryland and another one at the Sheldon Hall in St. Louis, Missouri.

In June he performed at a black-tie event at the Sharon Lynne Wilson Arts Center in Wisconsin. In July, Frangoulis performed his first concert in Istanbul, a sold-out outdoor concert under the auspices of the Ecumenical Patriarch Bartholomew.

He spent the rest of the summer in Greece for his usual concert tour around the country, culminating with the "Music of the Night" concert held in October at the Herodes Atticus theater accompanied by the New Opera of Moscow Symphony Orchestra and Chorus. Later that month, he took part in Plácido Domingo's concert in Cyprus, featuring Kallen Esperian, accompanied by the Cyprus State Symphony and the Moscow New Opera Symphony Orchestra.

==== 2006 ====
His second successful tour in The United States and later international with a number of solo concerts:

- 7 January – Solo concert in honor of Ecumenical Patriarch Bartholomew in Tampa, Florida at the Sun Dome, with the Orlando Philharmonic Orchestra and the Archdiocesan Metropolitan Youth Choir
- 6 & 7 April – Horatio Alger Award Ceremony Washington, DC
- 10 June – Fundraising Gala Event – Sharon Wilson Center, Brookefield, Wisconsin
- 9 April – Cincinnati, Ohio – Yellow Ribbon Scholarship Fundraising Event
- 6 May – Solo concert at the Detroit Opera House in Detroit, Michigan
- 16 June – Solo Concert – Sanders Theater – sponsored by the Greek Institute at Harvard in Cambridge, Massachusetts.
- 24–28 June Greek Concert tour (Piraeus, Athens, Thessaloniki etc.)
- 30 June – Private Gala Event – Baalbek, Lebanon International Music Festival's 50 years anniversary
- 2 July, his second concert in Turkey, at the Harbiye outdoor theater in Istanbul
- October: at the Herodes Atticus theater, "Tribute to Mario Lanza" concert.
- October: debut Concert in Chicago with the Chicago Symphony at Orchestra Hall and at the Landmark Theater in Richmond with the Richmond Symphony.

==== 2007 ====
Frangoulis completed his new album Amor Oscuro (Skotinos Erotas), dedicated to the Spanish poet and dramatist Federico García Lorca. In April he performed with Elena Kelessidi and the Baltimore Opera Company orchestra at the Lyric Opera House in Baltimore and in October he returned to The United States for a concert in Boston. In December, Frangoulis released another album: "Passione" a collection of songs that Mario Lanza performed.

==== 2008 ====
Frangoulis toured in the United States leg of Sarah Brightman's "The Symphony World Tour".

==== 2009–2011 ====
Frangoulis had various appearances in Athenian and other Greek venues in those two years. He was invited by the Special Olympics Committee to take a major part on the opening ceremony of the event in June 2011. Since he adores children, Frangoulis gave a warmhearted performance, presenting a song from his new third international album Beautiful Things, which was first released in a place that occupies a special spot in Frangoulis's heart: the country of Greece. The album was released in November 2011. It was released in the United States and the rest of the world in winter of 2012.

==== 2012 ====
Frangoulis had a successful appearance with the Boston Pops Orchestra and Hayley Westenra at Symphony Hall in Boston the month of June. He continued his summer with a multi-city tour in his native Greece where he concluded it with his first official concert of Beautiful Things album, in a majestic night under the August blue moon, at the Herodes Atticus Theater in Athens, Greece.

==== 2014 ====
In 2014 Mario Frangoulis performed with the acclaimed Norwegian soprano Sissel at a concert on Friday 5 September at the Odeon of Herodes Atticus in Greece. This concert, "Sing Me An Angel" was held in aid of the Non Profit Organisation "I Live For Me" and it was made for broadcasting on American television in 2015, on PBS. They performed several duets like "You Raise Me Up", "Smile" and "What A Wonderful World".

==== 2016 ====
In 2016 Frangoulis recorded a duets album in Greek with Greek singer George Perris titled "Kivotos" which included covers of popular Greek art songs from the 80s and 90s. The album peaked to #3 in the Greek Album Charts.

=== Charity work ===
Frangoulis has sung in about forty charity galas, such as the Red Cross Annual Ball, held at the Grosvenor House, several galas organized by the Greek foundation Elpida, a charity dedicated to the cure of children who suffer from cancer in Athens, Greece and many others worldwide. As a producer full of loyalty and kindness, Frangoulis has organized charity shows and concerts for children in need, such as the one for the Michael S. Polemis Foundation.

- 2002: José Carreras International Leukemia Foundation gala concert in Leipzig, Germany with Plácido Domingo, Harry Belafonte, Sarah Connors and others.
- March 2003: charity concert for Action Aid with soprano Elena Kelessidou at the National Greek Opera
- September 2003: UNESCO concert during the International Conference for the Cultural Management of World Heritage Cities, Rhodes
- December 2004: "Refugee Voices; a concert for Darfur" – concert in aid of the children of Darfur held at the Royal Albert Hall, London
- April 2005: Concert for the Horatio Alger Association at the DAR Constitution Hall in Washington, D.C.
- 26 January 2005, following the tsunami devastation in Southern Asia, Mario Frangoulis participated in a fundraising concert, held by the National Television of Greece, in support of the children which lost their families in the disaster.
- October 2006: concert in Chicago with the Chicago Symphony Orchestra for the benefit of Chicago's Hellenic Museum and Cultural Center
- November 2007: Give Us Your Poor, a benefit concert for the homeless in Boston at The Strand theater He also appears on a compilation album of the same name.
- April 2012: Concert for the Horatio Alger Association at the DAR Constitution Hall in Washington, D.C..

== Discography ==
Personal discography:

Title	Release date	Company	Imprint
Fengari Erotevmeno	Summer 1999	Sony Music Greece	Sony Classical
Acropolis Concert	December 2000	Sony Music Greece	Sony Classical
Sometimes I Dream	17 September 2002	Sony Classical	Odyssey
Sometimes I Dream	December 2002	Sony Music Greece	Odyssey
Follow Your Heart	16 August 2004 (Europe); January 2005 (North America)	Sony Classical	-
"Enas Hartinos Ilios"	April 2005	Sony Music Greece	Sony Classical
O Kipos Ton Efchon	May 2005	Sony BMG Greece	Sony Classical
Music of the Night	December 2006	Sony BMG Greece	Sony Classical
Amore Oscuro	June 2007	Sony BMG Greece	Sony Classical
Passione – A Tribute to Mario Lanza	December 2007	Sony BMG Greece	Sony Classical
Mario & Friends 1	8 December 2008	Sony Greece	Sony Classical
Mario & Friends 2	April 2009	Sony Greece	Sony Classical
"Seasons of Love"	2009	4 Men Productions / Sony Music Greece	Greece
Beautiful Things	2011 (International Release)	Sony Music Greece	Sony Classical
Tales of Christmas	November 2015	Universal Music Greece	Minos EMI
Kivotos	May 2016	Universal Music Greece	Minos EMI

Live DVD:

- Sometimes I Dream live in concert DVD
- Music of the Night live CD/DVD in PAL format (12/2006)
- Mario Frangoulis Live with the Boston Pops, Keith Lockhart

Appearances in other albums:

- Apple/Full WS Sub Apple (1980) A DVD of the movie. Two idealistic folk singers take up residence at a decadent artists's colony run by a sleazy svengali, only to revolt against his bourgeois values. Campy cult fare, with "futuristic" production values that wear the indelible stamp of the 1980s' New Wave.
- Bernard J. Taylor: Nosferatu the Vampire (in the role of Jonathan)
- Giannis Markopoulos: Ana-ghennisi: apo tin Venetia stin Poli (sings two songs)
- "Con te partiro" Single with George Dalaras
- George Dalaras: Dalaras in Iera Odos (duets with Dalaras)
- Cole Porter: De Lovely (18 October 2004) (Soundtrack of the film; sings the duet "So in love" with Lara Fabian)
- Jim Brickman: Grace (2005) ("Ave Maria" with Jim Brickman)
- Various Artists: Bravo Act II (2006); features artists such as Luciano Pavarotti, Kiri Te Kanawa, Hayley Westenra, Sarah Brightman, Il Divo and Amici Forever (Frangoulis sings track 3, "Adagio")
- Various Artists: Give Us Your Poor (2007) (sings "Feels Like Home")
- Carpe Diem duet with Sarah Brightman (2008); A Winter Symphony CD Album
- "Stis Gis tin akri" duet with George Perris (2008); Perno Anasa Album
