= The Phantom of the Opera (2004 soundtrack) =

Soundtrack album by Various
- Released: November 23, 2004
- Genres: Musical, classical music
- Label: Sony Music
- Producer: Andrew Lloyd Webber

Various chronology
| The Phantom of the Opera (2004) | The Phantom of the Opera Special 2-Disc Deluxe Edition (2004) |

The Phantom of the Opera is the soundtrack of the 2004 film which is based on the Andrew Lloyd Webber musical. There were two versions released, the standard 14-track release and a two-disc deluxe edition.

== Track listing ==
In addition to the listed tracks, remixes of "The Phantom of the Opera" by Junior Vasquez, were made available to iTunes customers who purchased the expanded edition.

=== Normal release ===
| No. | Title | Performer(s) | Length |
|---|---|---|---|
| 1. | "Overture" | | 2:45 |
| 2. | "Think of Me" | Emmy Rossum, Patrick Wilson | 3:39 |
| 3. | "Angel of Music" | Emmy Rossum, Jennifer Ellison, Gerard Butler | 2:42 |
| 4. | "The Mirror (Angel of Music)" | Emmy Rossum, Gerard Butler | 1:59 |
| 5. | "The Phantom of the Opera" | Emmy Rossum, Gerard Butler | 3:34 |
| 6. | "The Music of the Night" | Gerard Butler | 5:40 |
| 7. | "Prima Donna" | Ciarán Hinds, Simon Callow, Patrick Wilson, Margaret Preece, Miranda Richardson, Jennifer Ellison, Emmy Rossum, Victor McGuire | 3:28 |
| 8. | "All I Ask of You" | Emmy Rossum, Patrick Wilson | 4:52 |
| 9. | "All I Ask of You (Reprise)" | Gerard Butler, Emmy Rossum, Patrick Wilson | 2:14 |
| 10. | "Masquerade" | | 5:29 |
| 11. | "Wishing You Were Somehow Here Again" | Emmy Rossum | 3:41 |
| 12. | "The Point of No Return" | Emmy Rossum, Gerard Butler | 8:00 |
| 13. | "Down Once More/Track Down This Murderer" | Gerard Butler, Emmy Rossum, Patrick Wilson | 12:46 |
| 14. | "Learn to Be Lonely" | Minnie Driver | 2:21 |

=== Two disc deluxe edition ===
Disc 1
| No. | Title | Performer(s) | Length |
|---|---|---|---|
| 1. | "Prologue" | | 2:47 |
| 2. | "Overture/Hannibal" | Margaret Preece, Victor McGuire, Opera Chorus | 7:25 |
| 3. | "Think of Me" | Emmy Rossum, Patrick Wilson | 6:33 |
| 4. | "Angel of Music" | Emmy Rossum, Jennifer Ellison, Gerard Butler | 2:59 |
| 5. | "Little Lotte/The Mirror (Angel of Music)" | Emmy Rossum, Gerard Butler | 4:11 |
| 6. | "The Phantom of the Opera" | Emmy Rossum, Gerard Butler | 4:23 |
| 7. | "The Music of the Night" | Gerard Butler | 5:38 |
| 8. | "Magical Lasso" | Miranda Richardson, Kevin McNally | 1:19 |
| 9. | "I Remember/Stranger Than You Dreamt It" | Emmy Rossum, Gerard Butler | 3:21 |
| 10. | "Notes.../Prima Donna" | Ciarán Hinds, Simon Callow, Gerard Butler, Patrick Wilson, Margaret Preece, Miranda Richardson, Jennifer Ellison, Victor McGuire | 10:04 |
| 11. | "Poor Fool, He Makes Me Laugh/Il Muto" | Margaret Preece, Victor McGuire, Gerard Butler, Jennifer Ellison, Emmy Rossum, Ciarán Hinds, Simon Callow, Kevin McNally | 6:12 |
| 12. | "Why Have You Brought Me Here/Raoul I've Been There" | Patrick Wilson, Emmy Rossum | 3:04 |
| 13. | "All I Ask of You" | Emmy Rossum, Patrick Wilson | 4:52 |
| 14. | "All I Ask of You (Reprise)" | Gerard Butler, Emmy Rossum, Patrick Wilson | 2:55 |

Disc 2
| No. | Title | Performer(s) | Length |
|---|---|---|---|
| 1. | "Masquerade / Why So Silent" | Ciarán Hinds, Simon Callow, Margaret Preece, Victor McGuire, Jennifer Ellison, Miranda Richardson, Patrick Wilson, Emmy Rossum, Gerard Butler | 8:38 |
| 2. | "Madame Giry's Tale/The Fairground" | Miranda Richardson | 3:29 |
| 3. | "Journey to the Cemetery" | Emmy Rossum | 3:29 |
| 4. | "Wishing You Were Somehow Here Again" | Emmy Rossum | 3:41 |
| 5. | "Wandering Child" | Emmy Rossum, Gerard Butler | 1:47 |
| 6. | "The Swordfight" | Gerard Butler, Patrick Wilson, Emmy Rossum | 1:48 |
| 7. | "We Have All Been Blind" | Patrick Wilson, Emmy Rossum, Gerard Butler | 3:55 |
| 8. | "Don Juan" | Victor McGuire, Gerard Butler, Emmy Rossum | 4:00 |
| 9. | "The Point of No Return/Chandelier Crash" | Emmy Rossum, Gerard Butler | 6:43 |
| 10. | "Down Once More/Track Down This Murderer" | Gerard Butler, Emmy Rossum, Patrick Wilson | 14:32 |
| 11. | "Learn to Be Lonely" | Minnie Driver | 2:27 |

== Personnel ==
- Vocals: Gerard Butler, Emmy Rossum, Patrick Wilson
- Studio Assistants: Aaron Fessel, Cesar Ramirez
- Producer: Andrew Lloyd Webber
- Casting: Chris Overton, Anne Skilbeck
- Mixing: Anna Behlmer, Andy Nelson
- Photography: Alex Bailey

== Accomplishments and certifications ==
In 2006, The Phantom of the Opera won the RIAJ's Japan Gold Disc Award for "Best Soundtrack Album of the Year." The album performed well on the charts, reaching the top position of Billboard's soundtracks chart as well as the sixteenth position on the Top 200 chart. It reached platinum in the US and gold in the UK and Greece.

"Learn to Be Lonely" was written for the film by Andrew Lloyd Webber and Charles Hart. They recycled the melody of the deleted song "No One Would Listen", sang by Gerard Butler. No One Would Listen was nominated for an Academy Award for Best Original Song at the 77th Academy Awards and a Golden Globe at the 62nd Golden Globe Awards.

== Charts and certifications ==
=== Weekly charts ===
| Chart (2005–2006) | Peak position |
|---|---|
| Austrian Albums (Ö3 Austria) | 24 |
| Australian Albums (ARIA) | 11 |
| Danish Albums (Hitlisten) | 8 |
| Finnish Albums (Suomen virallinen lista) | 10 |
| French Albums (SNEP) | 66 |
| German Albums (Offizielle Top 100) | 33 |
| Hungarian Albums (MAHASZ) | 3 |
| New Zealand Albums (RMNZ) | 15 |
| Norwegian Albums (VG-lista) | 18 |
| Portuguese Albums (AFP) | 11 |
| Scottish Albums (Official Charts) | 52 |
| Singaporean Albums (RIAS) | 5 |
| Spanish Albums (Promusicae) | 58 |
| Swiss Albums (Schweizer Hitparade) | 34 |
| UK Albums (Official Charts) | 40 |
| US Billboard 200 | 16 |
| US Top Soundtracks (Billboard) | 1 |

| Chart (2026) | Peak position |
|---|---|
| UK Compilation Albums (Official Charts) | 60 |

=== Year-end charts ===
| Chart (2005) | Position |
|---|---|
| Australian Albums (ARIA) | 93 |
| US Billboard 200 | 72 |
| US Soundtrack Albums (Billboard) | 2 |
| Chart (2006) | Position |
| US Soundtrack Albums (Billboard) | 16 |

=== Certifications ===
| Region | Certification | Certified units/sales |
|---|---|---|
| Australia (ARIA) | Gold | 35,000^{^} |
| Greece (IFPI Greece) | Gold | 10,000^{^} |
| Taiwan | — | 40,000 |
| United Kingdom (BPI) | Gold | 100,000^{^} |
| United States (RIAA) | Platinum | 1,000,000^{^} |
^{^} Shipments figures based on certification alone.
