= List of awards and nominations received by Andrew Lloyd Webber =

Andrew Lloyd Webber awards and nominations
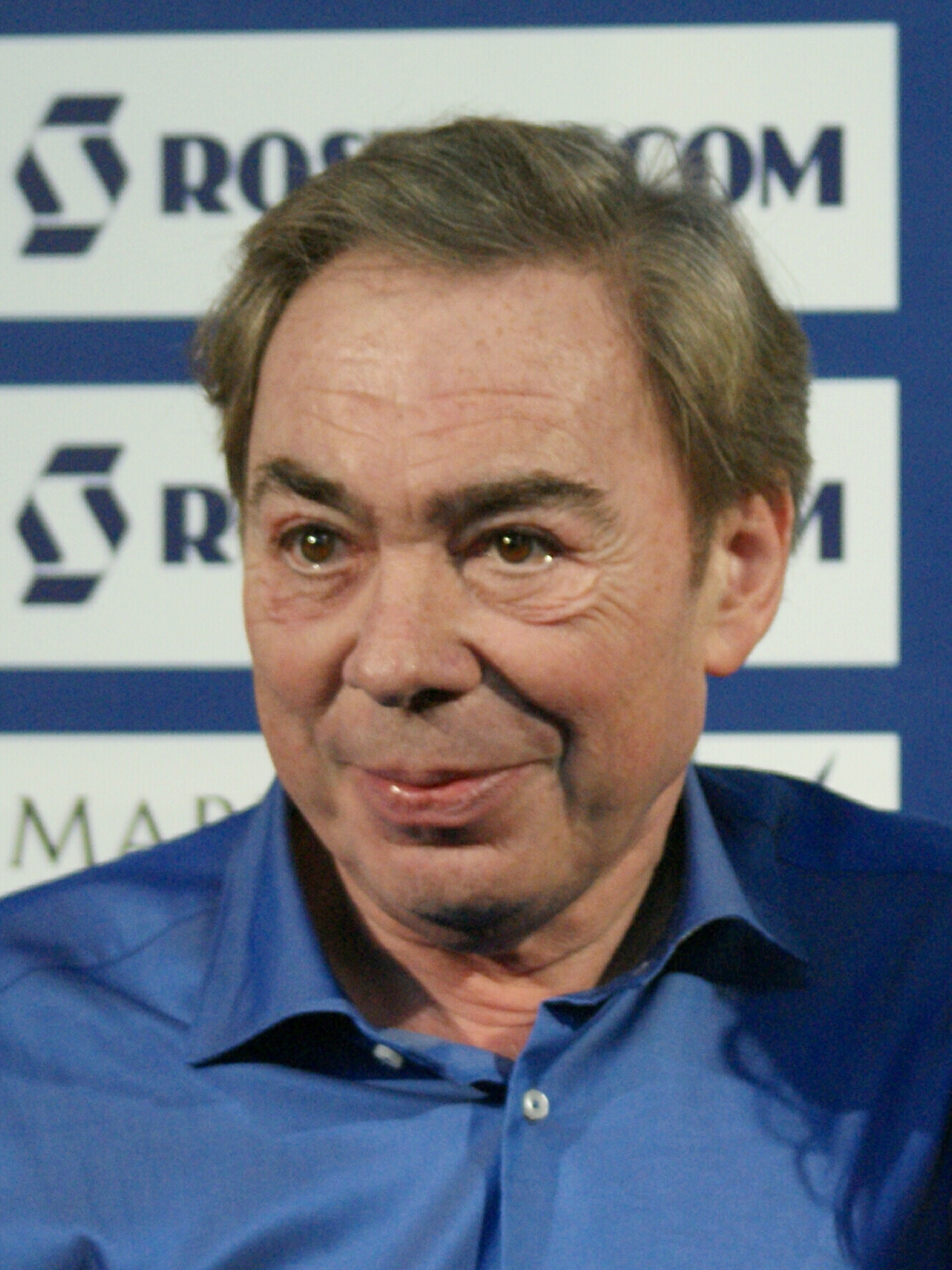
- Lloyd Webber at the Eurovision 2009
Awards and nominations
Award	Wins	Nominations
Academy Awards	1	3
British Academy Film Awards	0	1
Golden Globe Awards	1	3
Grammy Awards	3	14
Laurence Olivier Awards	4	11
Primetime Emmy Awards	1	1
Tony Awards	8	28

Andrew Lloyd Webber is an English composer.

He is an EGOT winner, having won a Primetime Emmy Award, three Grammy Awards, an Academy Award (Oscar), and six Tony Awards.

Lloyd Webber is known for his various stage work Joseph and the Amazing Technicolor Dreamcoat (1968), Jesus Christ Superstar (1970), Evita (1976), Cats (1981), The Phantom of the Opera (1986), Sunset Boulevard (1993), and School of Rock (2015).

== British state honours ==
- 1992: Knight Bachelor, for services to the arts
- 1997: Life Peerage (as Baron Lloyd-Webber, of Sydmonton in the County of Hampshire)
- 2024: Knight Companion of the Order of the Garter

== Major professional awards ==
=== Academy Awards ===
Year	Category	Nominated work	Result	Ref.
Academy Awards
1973	Best Original Song Score and Adaptation or Scoring	Jesus Christ Superstar	Nominated	
1996	Best Original Song	"You Must Love Me" (from Evita)	Won	
2004	Best Original Song	"Learn to Be Lonely" (for The Phantom of the Opera)	Nominated	

=== BAFTA Awards ===
Year	Category	Nominated work	Result	Ref.
British Academy Film Awards
1996	Best Original Music	Evita	Nominated	

=== Golden Globes Awards ===
Year	Category	Nominated work	Result	Ref.
Golden Globe Awards
1996	Best Original Song	"You Must Love Me" (from Evita)	Won	
2004	Best Original Song	"Learn to Be Lonely" (for The Phantom of the Opera)	Nominated	
2019	Best Original Song	"Beautiful Ghosts" (from Cats)	Nominated	

=== Grammy Awards ===
Year	Category	Nominated work	Result	Ref.
Grammy Awards
1972	Best Pop Performance by a Duo, Group or Chorus	Jesus Christ Superstar	Nominated	
1972	Album of the Year	Jesus Christ Superstar	Nominated	
1973	Album of the Year	Jesus Christ Superstar	Nominated	
1981	Best Cast Show Album	Evita	Won	
1983	Best Cast Show Album	Joseph and the Amazing Technicolor Dreamcoat	Nominated	
1983	Best Cast Show Album	Cats	Nominated	
1984	Best Cast Show Album	Cats	Won	
1986	Best Contemporary Composition	Requiem	Won	
1988	Best Musical Cast Show Album	The Phantom of the Opera	Nominated	
1990	Best Musical Cast Show Album	Aspects of Love	Nominated	
1990	Grammy Legend Award	—N/a	Received	
1994	Best Musical Show Album	Joseph and the Amazing Technicolor Dreamcoat	Nominated	
1995	Best Musical Show Album	Sunset Boulevard	Nominated	
2019	Best Musical Theater Album	Jesus Christ Superstar Live in Concert	Nominated	
2021	Best Song Written for Visual Media	"Beautiful Ghosts" (from Cats)	Nominated	
2022	Best Musical Theater Album	Cinderella	Nominated	

=== Laurence Olivier Awards ===
Year	Category	Nominated work	Result	Ref.
Laurence Olivier Awards
1978	Musical of the Year	Evita	Won	
1981	Musical of the Year	Cats	Won	
1984	Musical of the Year	Starlight Express	Nominated	
1986	Musical of the Year	The Phantom of the Opera	Won	
1994	Best New Musical	Sunset Boulevard	Nominated	
1999	Best New Musical	Whistle Down the Wind	Nominated	
2001	Best New Musical	The Beautiful Game	Nominated	
2002	Audience Award for Most Popular Show	The Phantom of the Opera	Won	
2005	Best New Musical	The Woman in White	Nominated	
2008	Society of London Theatre Special Award	—N/a	Honoured	
2011	Best New Musical	Love Never Dies	Nominated	
2017	Best New Musical	School of Rock: The Musical	Nominated	

=== Emmy Awards ===
Year	Category	Nominated work	Result	Ref.
Primetime Emmy Awards
2018	Outstanding Variety Special (Live)	Jesus Christ Superstar Live in Concert (as Executive Producer)	Won	

=== Tony Awards ===
Year	Category	Nominated work	Result	Ref.
Tony Awards
1972	Best Original Score	Jesus Christ Superstar	Nominated	
1980	Best Original Score	Evita	Won	
1982	Best Original Score	Joseph and the Amazing Technicolor Dreamcoat	Nominated	
1983	Best Musical	Cats	Won	
1983	Best Original Score	Cats	Won	
1986	Best Musical	Song and Dance	Nominated	
1986	Best Original Score	Song and Dance	Nominated	
1987	Best Original Score	Starlight Express	Nominated	
1988	Best Musical	The Phantom of the Opera	Won	
1988	Best Book of a Musical	The Phantom of the Opera	Nominated	
1988	Best Original Score	The Phantom of the Opera	Nominated	
1989	Best Play	Lend Me a Tenor	Nominated	
1989	Best Play	Shirley Valentine	Nominated	
1990	Best Musical	Aspects of Love	Nominated	
1990	Best Book of a Musical	Aspects of Love	Nominated	
1990	Best Original Score	Aspects of Love	Nominated	
1995	Best Musical	Sunset Boulevard	Won	
1995	Best Original Score	Sunset Boulevard	Won	
2000	Best Revival of a Musical	Jesus Christ Superstar	Nominated	
2006	Best Original Score	The Woman in White	Nominated	
2012	Best Revival of a Musical	Jesus Christ Superstar	Nominated	
2016	Best Musical	School of Rock: The Musical	Nominated	
2016	Best Original Score	School of Rock: The Musical	Nominated	
2018	Lifetime Achievement in the Theatre	—N/a	Received	
2025	Best Revival of a Musical	Sunset Boulevard	Won	
2025	Best Orchestrations	Sunset Boulevard	Nominated	
2026	Best Revival of a Musical	Cats: The Jellicle Ball	Nominated	
2026	Best Orchestrations	Cats: The Jellicle Ball	Nominated	

== Miscellaneous awards ==
=== Drama Desk Awards ===
Year	Category	Nominated work	Result	Ref.
Drama Desk Awards
1972	Most Promising Composer	Jesus Christ Superstar	Won	
1980	Outstanding Music	Evita	Won	
1983	Outstanding Music	Cats	Won	
1986	Outstanding Music	Song and Dance	Nominated	
1987	Outstanding Music	Starlight Express	Nominated	
1988	Outstanding Musical	The Phantom of the Opera	Nominated	
1988	Outstanding Music	The Phantom of the Opera	Won	
1988	Outstanding Orchestrations	The Phantom of the Opera	Won	
1989	Outstanding New Play	Shirley Valentine	Nominated	
1990	Outstanding Musical	Aspects of Love	Nominated	
1990	Outstanding Music	Aspects of Love	Nominated	
1990	Outstanding Orchestrations	Aspects of Love	Nominated	
1991	Outstanding New Play	La Bête	Nominated	
1995	Outstanding Musical	Sunset Boulevard	Nominated	
2012	Outstanding Revival of a Musical	Jesus Christ Superstar	Nominated	
2016	Outstanding Musical	School of Rock: The Musical	Nominated	
2016	Outstanding Music	School of Rock: The Musical	Nominated	
2016	Outstanding Orchestrations	School of Rock: The Musical	Nominated	

=== Gold Derby Awards ===
Year	Category	Nominated work	Result	Ref.
Gold Derby Awards
2004	Best Original Song	"Learn to Be Lonely" (for The Phantom of the Opera)	Nominated	

=== Online Film & Television Association Awards ===
Year	Category	Nominated work	Result	Ref.
1996	Best Score	Evita	Won	
1996	Best Original Song	"You Must Love Me" (from Evita)	Won	
1996	Best Adapted Song	"Don't Cry for Me Argentina" (from Evita)	Won	
2004	Best Adapted Song	"The Music of the Night" (for The Phantom of the Opera)	Nominated	

=== Satellite Awards ===
Year	Category	Nominated work	Result	Ref.
Satellite Awards
1996	Best Original Song	"You Must Love Me" (from Evita)	Won	
2004	Best Adapted Screenplay	The Phantom of the Opera (Shared with Joel Schumacher)	Nominated	
2004	Best Original Song	"Learn to Be Lonely" (for The Phantom of the Opera)	Nominated	

=== World Soundtrack Awards ===
Year	Category	Nominated work	Result	Ref.
World Soundtrack Awards
2005	Best Original Song Written for a Film	"Learn to Be Lonely" (for The Phantom of the Opera)	Nominated	

== Special honours ==
=== American Theater Hall of Fame ===
Year	Honour	Result	Ref.
2009	American Theater Hall of Fame	Inducted	

=== Hollywood Walk of Fame ===
Year	Honour	Result	Ref.
1993	Hollywood Walk of Fame	Inducted	

=== Kennedy Center Honors ===
Year	Honour	Result	Ref.
2006	Kennedy Center Honors	Inducted	

=== Songwriters Hall of Fame ===
Year	Honour	Result	Ref.
1995	Songwriters Hall of Fame	Inducted	

== Other awards ==
- 1984: Variety Club of Great Britain Awards Special Award.
- 1995: Praemium Imperiale
- 1997: Variety Club of Great Britain Awards Outstanding Contribution to Showbusiness.
- 2008: Brit Award for Outstanding Contribution to Music
- 2008: Woodrow Wilson Award for Public Service
- 2014: Ivor Novello Awards from the British Academy of Songwriters, Composers and Authors
- 2019: Golden Plate Award of the American Academy of Achievement
- 2026: Freedom of the City of London
