= World Soundtrack Awards 2005 =

Belgian music awards ceremony

5th World Soundtrack Awards

October 15, 2005

Best Original Soundtrack:
War of the Worlds

The 5th World Soundtrack Awards were given on 15 October 2005 in the Bijloke Concert Hall, Ghent, Belgium.

== Winners ==
- Best Soundtrack Composer of the Year:
  - Angelo Badalamenti – Un long dimanche de fiançailles (A Very Long Engagement)
- Best Original Soundtrack of the Year:
  - War of the Worlds – John Williams
- Best Original Song Written for a Film:
  - "Old Habits Die Hard" – Alfie
    - Performed by Mick Jagger
    - Lyrics by Dave Stewart and Mick Jagger
- Public Choice Award:
  - Alexander – Vangelis
- Discovery of the Year
  - Michael Giacchino – The Incredibles
- Lifetime Achievement Award:
  - Jerry Leiber and Mike Stoller

== Nominees ==
- Best Soundtrack Composer of the Year:
  - Thomas Newman – Lemony Snicket
  - John Powell – The Bourne Supremacy
  - Howard Shore – The Aviator
  - John Williams – War of the Worlds
- Best Original Soundtrack of the Year:
  - The Aviator – Howard Shore
  - Batman Begins – James Newton Howard and Hans Zimmer
  - The Bourne Supremacy – John Powell
  - Mar adentro (Sea Inside) – Alejandro Amenábar
- Best Original Song Written for a Film:
  - "Remember Me" – Troy
    - Composed by James Horner
    - Performed by Josh Groban
    - Lyrics by Cynthia Weil
  - "Al otro lado del río" – Diarios de motocicleta (The Motorcycle Diaries)
    - Performed by Jorge Drexler
    - Lyrics by Jorge Drexler
  - "Believe" – The Polar Express
    - Composed by Alan Silvestri
    - Performed by Josh Groban
    - Lyrics by Glen Ballard
  - "Learn to Be Lonely" – The Phantom of the Opera
    - Composed by Andrew Lloyd Webber
    - Performed by Minnie Driver
    - Lyrics by Charles Hart
  - "Million Voices" – Hotel Rwanda
    - Composed by Andrea Guerra
    - Performed by Wyclef Jean
    - Lyrics by Wyclef Jean and Jerry Duplessis
- Discovery of the Year:
  - Ilan Eshkeri – Layer Cake
  - Andrés Goldstein and Daniel Tarrab – Deuda
  - Cyril Morin – The Syrian Bride
  - Benjamin Wallfish – Dear Wendy
