= Jonny Polonsky =

American musician

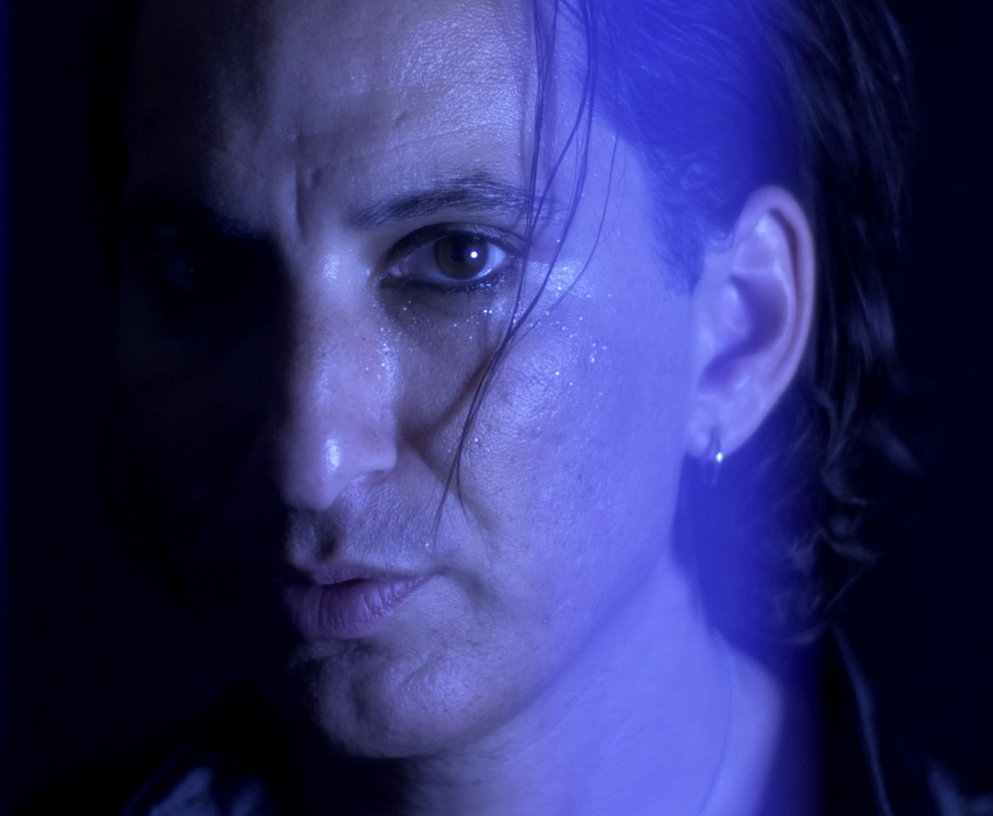

Background information
- Born: July 10, 1973 (age 53); Chicago, Illinois, U.S.
- Occupations: Musician, songwriter, record producer
- Instruments: Guitar, vocals, bass, drums, keyboards
- Years active: 1996–present
- Website: jonnypolonsky.com

Jonny Polonsky (born July 10, 1973) is an American songwriter, rock guitarist, singer, multi-instrumentalist and record producer.

== Career ==
Born in Chicago, Illinois and raised in suburban Wilmette, Illinois, Polonsky began writing, recording and self-releasing homemade cassettes as a teenager, under the name The Amazing Jonny Polonsky.

Marc Ribot introduced New York composer John Zorn to these early tapes, and Zorn invited Polonsky to play his New Jewish Music festival in 1992 at CBGB's Gallery. Polonsky's band featured Marc Ribot on guitar, Sebastian Steinberg (Soul Coughing) on bass, and Sim Cain (Rollins Band) on drums. Of that performance, singer Jeff Buckley (who was in attendance) was later quoted as saying, "He came to CBGB's Gallery and ripped it up...He killed 'em...The charm of it is that he's brought it into his own thing. It's a nice miniature. He does it with soul; you can tell the difference between someone who just slips into The Beatles or something and someone like him."

A year later Reeves Gabrels introduced Polonsky to Frank Black, who became an immediate fan. In 1994, original Pixies manager Ken Goes began representing Polonsky, and Frank Black produced a demo for him. On the strength of this demo recording, iconic record producer Rick Rubin signed Polonsky as a solo artist to his label American Recordings.

The Frank Black-produced demos were eventually scrapped, and Polonsky decided to rerecord the songs in his childhood home in Wilmette, using digital home recording equipment. He produced, recorded and performed everything himself on his debut record for American. Hi My Name is Jonny was mixed by Brendan O'Brien and was released by American Recordings on January 16, 1996. It received a positive critical reception from international news outlets, from The New York Times to MTV.

Immediately after the record's release, Polonsky and his live band toured as the main support act for Frank Black for twelve weeks in North America. They also performed on the Second Stage for the 1996 Lollapalooza summer tour.

Polonsky then disappeared from recording and touring as a solo artist. He reemerged as a touring musician in the late 1990s and into the new millennium with Local H and Pete Yorn, among others.

In 2004 Polonsky released The Power of Sound, and he and his band supported Audioslave on their five-week North American club tour in the spring of 2005.

In 2006, Polonsky formed the short-lived band Big Nose with Brad Wilk and Tim Commerford of Rage Against the Machine and Audioslave. Big Nose collaborated on two songs with Tool and A Perfect Circle frontman Maynard James Keenan. Keenan ended up using the two songs, "Sour Grapes" and "Momma Sed", for his music/art project Puscifer. Polonsky wrote, recorded and toured with Puscifer from 2007 to 2010.

Since that time, he has also recorded and/or performed with Johnny Cash., Neil Diamond, and Dixie Chicks

In 2012, Polonsky released his third full length, Intergalactic Messenger of Divine Light and Love as an internet only digital release. It was recorded in Rick Rubin's recording studio, Akademie Mathematique of Philosophical Sound Research, and mixed by engineer Jim Scott.

In 2015, The Other Side of Midnight was released. It was performed, produced and recorded by Polonsky, and mixed by Dean Hurley at David Lynch's Asymmetrical Studios.

Polonsky's fifth full length record, Fresh Flesh was released in January 2018. It was recorded with his live band in two days at Rick Rubin's studio, Shangri La Studios, in Malibu CA. It features guest performances by vocalist Mark Lanegan (Screaming Trees and Queens of the Stone Age), and drummer Kevin Haskins of Bauhaus (band), Love and Rockets (band), and Tones on Tail.

Kingdom of Sleep, Polonsky's sixth full length studio album was released on March 6, 2020. Cedric Bixler-Zavala, singer of The Mars Volta and At the Drive-In contributed vocals to the record. A subsequent European tour, completed just before the pandemic lockdown, was filmed for a documentary. "Hi My Name is Jonny Polonsky," directed by Otto-Jan Ham and Sjoerd Tanghe, was released later that year and went on to win Best Documentary at the Flemish Ensor Awards, the Belgian equivalent of the Academy Awards.

Polonsky's second full length release of 2020, and seventh overall studio album, Power and Greed and Money and Sex and Death was written and recorded during the COVID-19 pandemic lockdown in the spring and summer of 2020. It features guest appearances by Jane Wiedlin of The Go-Gos on vocals, and Hong Wang of the Kung Fu Panda soundtracks on erhu.

In 2021, Polonsky joined the band 7D7D, with Tim Commerford of Rage Against the Machine on bass and lead vocals, and Mathias Wakrat on drums. The trio began releasing music in late 2022.

== Discography ==
=== Solo ===
- Supernatural Radio (2024) Loosegroove Records
- Rise of the Rebel Angels (2023) Loosegroove Records
- Power and Greed and Money and Sex and Death (2020) Ghostworks Recordings
- Kingdom of Sleep (2020) Ghostworks Recordings
- UNRELEASHED: Demos and Rarities 1996–2018 (2018) Jett Plastic Recordings
- Fresh Flesh (2018) Sound Science Industries
- The Other Side of Midnight (2015) Sound Science Industries
- Vision (EP) (2014) self-released
- Intergalactic Messenger of Divine Light and Love (2012) self-released
- The Power of Sound (2004) Loveless Records
- Touched by Genius: The Ultimate TAJP Collection (2003) self-released
- There Is Something Wrong With You (EP) (2001) eggBERT Records
- Hi My Name is Jonny (1996) American Recordings

=== Appearances as instrumentalist ===
- Puscifer – Conditions of My Parole (2011) Puscifer Entertainment
- Tom Morello – World Wide Rebel Songs (2011) New West Records
- Johnny Cash – American VI: Ain't No Grave (2010) American Recordings
- Pete Yorn – Back and Fourth (2009) Columbia Records
- Neil Diamond – Home Before Dark (2008) American Recordings
- Mason Jennings – In the Ever (2008) Brushfire Records
- Puscifer – V is for Viagra: The Remixes (2008) Puscifer Entertainment
- Dan Wilson – Free Life (2007) American Recordings
- Minnie Driver – Seastories (2008) Zoë Records
- Puscifer – V is for Vagina (2007) Puscifer Entertainment
- Johnny Cash – American V: A Hundred Highways (2006) American Recordings
- Dixie Chicks – Taking the Long Way (2006) Columbia Records
- Neil Diamond – 12 Songs (2005) Columbia Records
- Various Artists – Axis of Justice Concert Series, Vol. 1 (2004) Columbia Records
- Minnie Driver – Everything I've Got in My Pocket (2004) Zoë Records
- Donovan – Sutras (1996) American Recordings

== Filmography ==
- Hi My Name Is Jonny Polonsky (2020) – Documentary (Woestijnvis)
- Sleeping Dogs Lie (2005 film)
