= Ask Me to Dance =

Ask Me to Dance may refer to:

- Ask Me to Dance (Minnie Driver album), 2014
- Ask Me to Dance (Cristy Lane album), 1980
- "Ask Me to Dance", a 1962 song by Jane Morgan
