= Everything I've Got in My Pocket =

Studio album by Minnie Driver
- Released: 5 October 2004
- Recorded: 2003–04
- Studio: The Clinic, West Hollywood, California
- Genre: Pop; rock
- Length: 46:35
- Label: Zoë/Trampoline (US); Liberty (UK)
- Producer: Marc Dauer; Jeff Trott

Minnie Driver chronology
Everything I've Got in My Pocket (2004)	Seastories (2007)

Everything I've Got in My Pocket is the debut studio album by British and American actress and singer Minnie Driver, released in 2004. The title track and "Invisible Girl" were released as singles, reaching No. 34 and No. 68 in the UK singles chart respectively. In the US, the album reached No. 43 on Billboard's Top Heatseekers chart, and it peaked at No. 44 in the UK Albums Chart.

The album track "Deeper Water" was featured at the end of the Smallville episode "Pariah".

== Critical reception ==
Professional ratings
Review scores
Source	Rating
AllMusic	2.5/5 stars

In a review for AllMusic, Thom Jurek wrote that "the songs are ably written, and Driver can sing to boot", describing the album as "pleasant, breezy, and gentle." On a more negative note, Jurek opined that "[the] songs possess no edge -- nothing to distinguish them whatsoever other than that they were recorded by a famous actress." He concluded the review by stating that the album "is a curiosity piece and little more."

== Track listing ==
All tracks written by Minnie Driver, except where noted.

No.	Title	Writer(s)	Length
1.	"Everything I've Got in My Pocket"		3:52
2.	"Invisible Girl"	Driver; Marc Dauer; Jeff Trott	3:35
3.	"Fast as You Can"		4:14
4.	"Wire"		4:59
5.	"Home"		3:53
6.	"Deeper Water"		5:25
7.	"So Well"		3:57
8.	"Hungry Heart"	Bruce Springsteen	4:09
9.	"Down"		4:36
10.	"Yellow Eyes"		5:03
11.	"Ruby Adeline"		2:43

== Personnel ==
Adapted from the album's liner notes.

=== Musicians ===
- Minnie Driver – vocals (all tracks), guitar (tracks 3, 6, 10)
- Mario Calire – drums (tracks 1, 3, 4, 6, 7, 9, 10)
- Malcolm Cross – percussion (tracks 1, 3, 5–7, 9, 10), drums (track 5)
- Marc Dauer – guitar (tracks 1, 3, 6, 7, 9–11), guitars (track 4), Mellotron (track 10)
- Rami Jaffee – piano (track 1), Chamberlin (tracks 1, 7, 9), vibraphone (track 1), Hammond B-3 (track 4), Casio keyboard (tracks 4, 6, 10), synthesizer (tracks 7, 9), music box (track 11)
- Chris Joyner – piano (track 5)
- Ben Peeler – lap steel guitar (tracks 1, 4–7, 9), pedal steel guitar (track 10)
- Joey Peters – drums (track 2), percussion (track 2)
- Jonny Polonsky – guitar (track 5)
- Zak Schaffer – bass guitar (tracks 1, 4–7, 9), guitar (track 5), piano (track 3)
- Jeff Trott – guitars (track 2), bass guitar (track 2), keyboards (track 2)
- Josh Turner – drum loop (tracks 1, 4, 10)
- Tim Walker – pedal steel guitar (tracks 3, 6)
- Al Wolovitch – upright bass (tracks 3, 10)

Note: No musicians are listed for track 8 in the liner notes.

=== Technical ===
- Marc Dauer – producer (all tracks), engineer
- Jeff Trott – producer (track 2), additional engineer, mixing (track 2)
- Zak Schaffer – engineer, mixing (track 8)
- Bob Demaa – additional engineer, mixing (track 5)
- Bob Salcedo – additional engineer
- Keith Schreiner – programming (track 2)
- Kevin Bartley – mastering
- Todd Burke – mixing (tracks 3, 4, 7, 9–11)
- Josh Turner – mixing (tracks 1, 6)
- Recorded at The Clinic, West Hollywood, California
- Jim Wright – cover photo, additional photos
- Dustin Lynn – additional photos
- Dave Lively & Jeff Motch – art direction & design

== Charts ==
Chart performance for Everything I've Got in My Pocket
Chart (2004)	Peak position
UK Albums (OCC)	44
US Billboard Top Heatseekers	43
