= 62nd Golden Globe Awards =

Film award ceremony in 2005

- Date: January 16, 2005
- Site: Beverly Hilton Hotel; Beverly Hills, Los Angeles, California

Highlights
- Best Film: Drama: The Aviator
- Best Film: Musical or Comedy: Sideways
- Best Drama Series: Nip/Tuck
- Best Musical or Comedy Series: Desperate Housewives
- Best Miniseries or Television movie: The Life and Death of Peter Sellers
- Most awards: (3) The Aviator
- Most nominations: (7) Sideways

Television coverage
- Network: NBC

The 62nd Golden Globe Awards, honoring the best in film and television for 2004, were held on January 16, 2005. The nominations were announced on December 13, 2004.

Sideways received the most nominations (7). The Aviator won the most awards, with 3 (including Best Motion Picture – Drama). Finding Neverland had the most nominations (5) without a single win.

== Winners and nominees ==
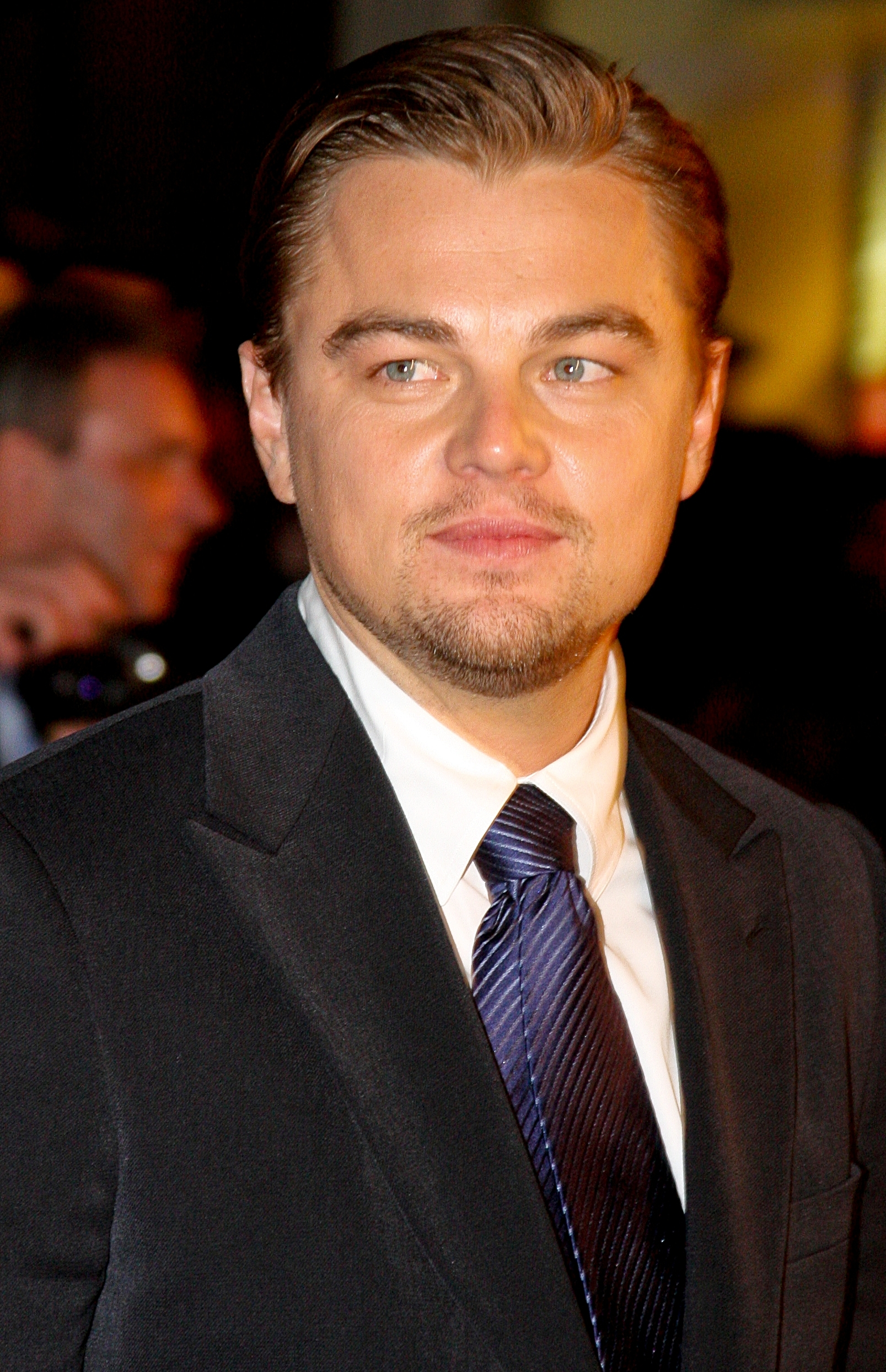
Leonardo DiCaprio, Best Actor in a Motion Picture – Drama winner

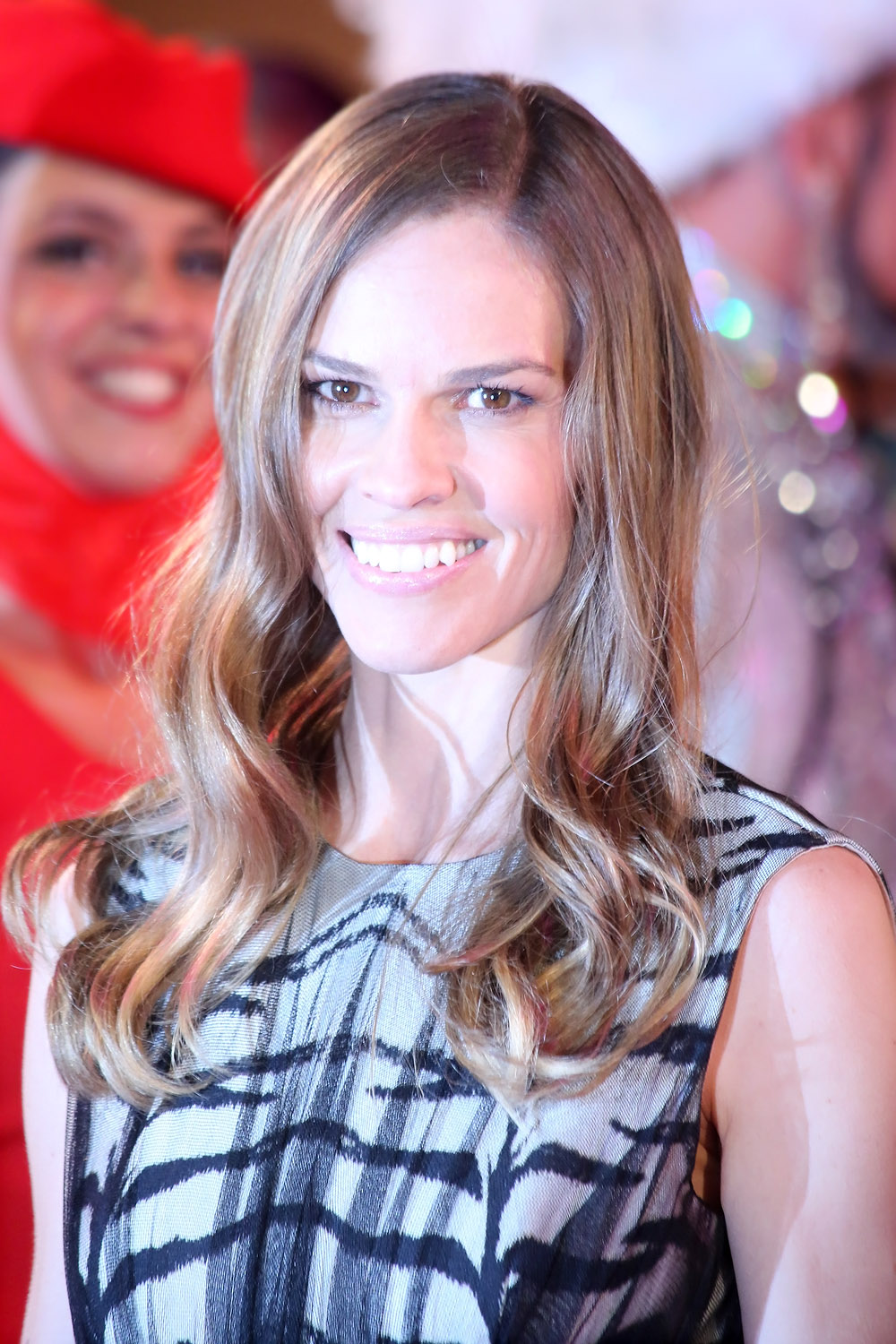
Hilary Swank, Best Actress in a Motion Picture – Drama winner

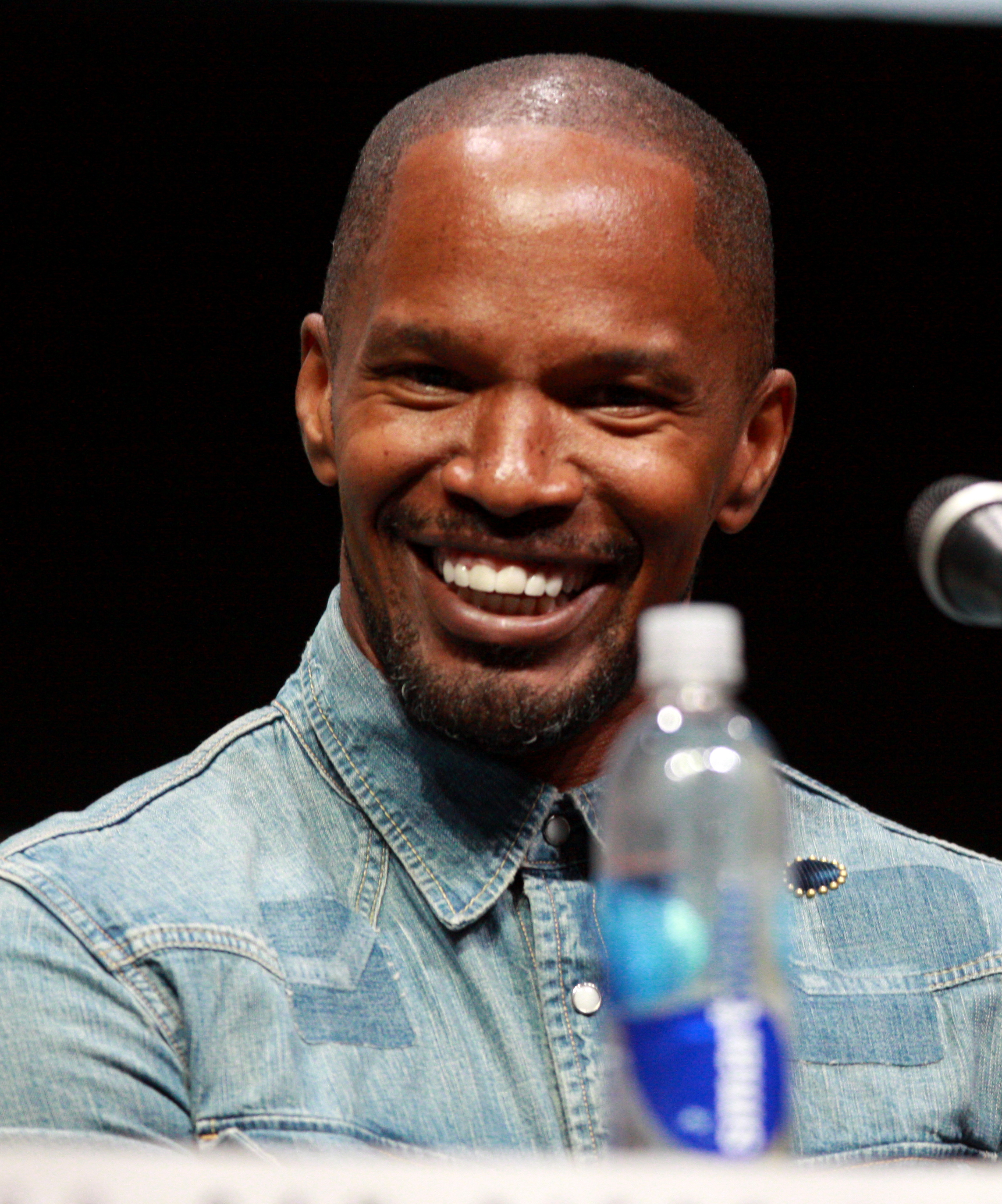
Jamie Foxx, Best Actor in a Motion Picture – Musical or Comedy winner

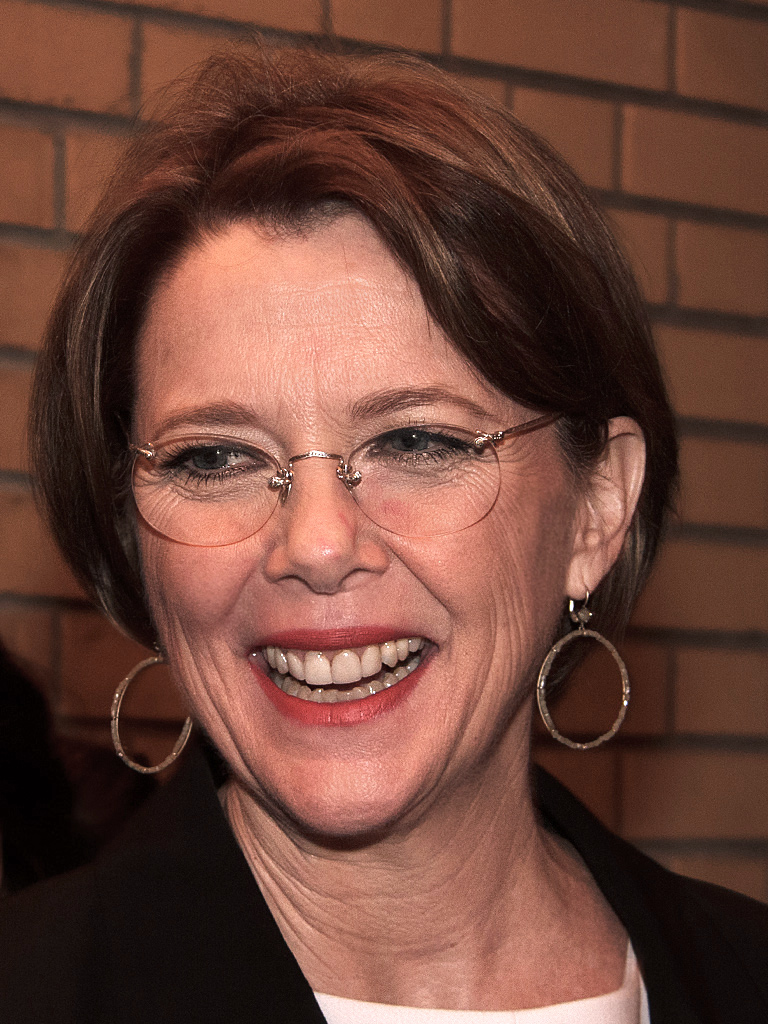
Annette Bening, Best Actress in a Motion Picture – Musical or Comedy winner

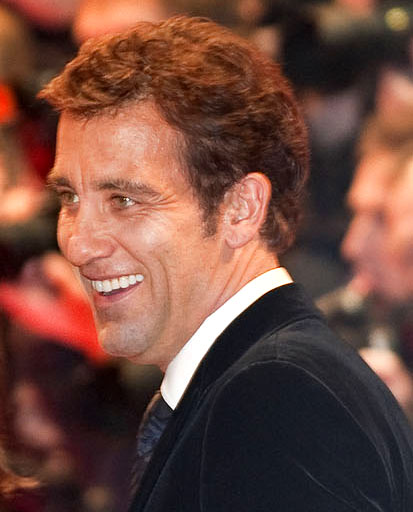
Clive Owen, Best Supporting Actor winner

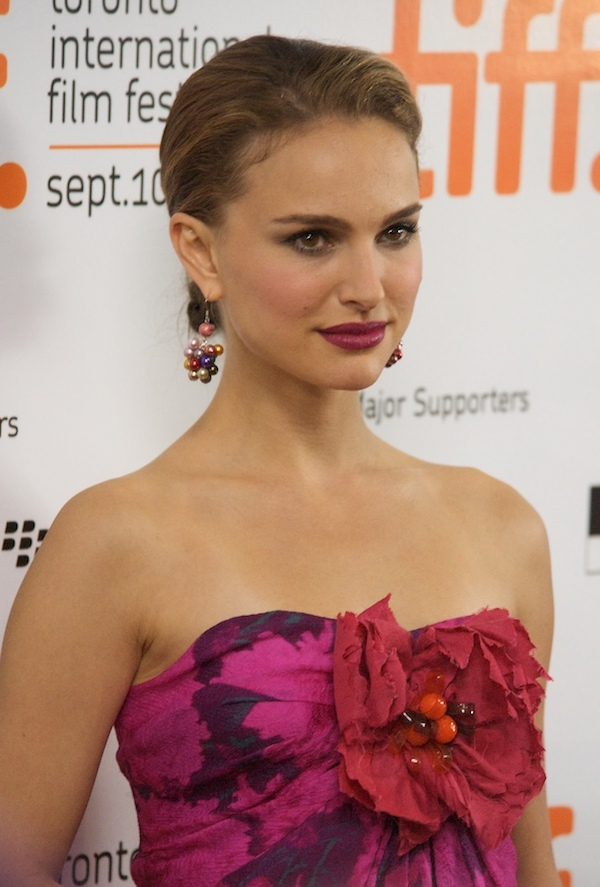
Natalie Portman, Best Supporting Actress winner

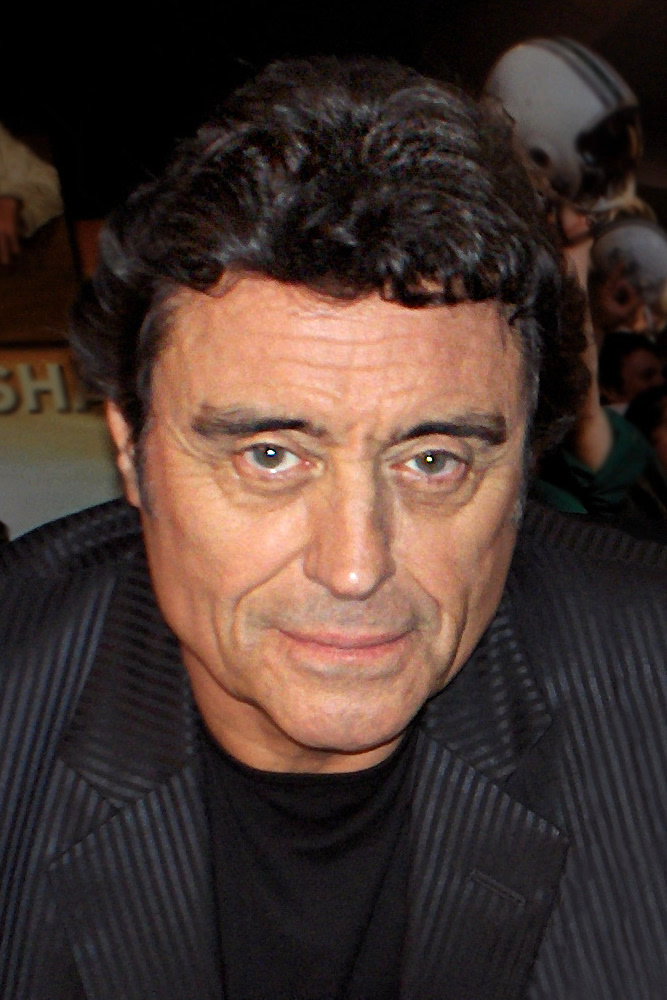
Ian McShane, Best Actor in a Television Series – Drama winner

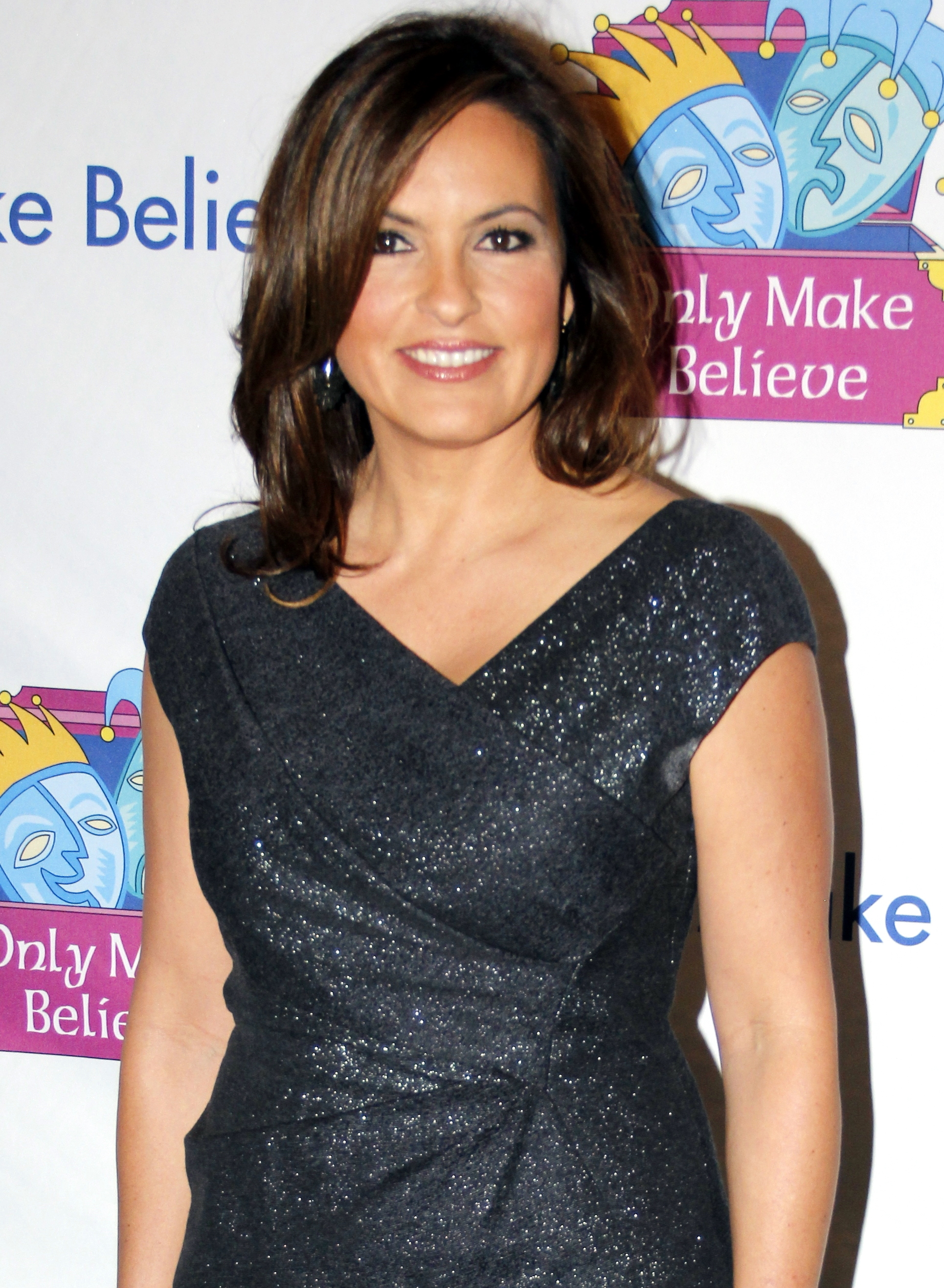
Mariska Hargitay, Best Actress in a Television Series – Drama winner

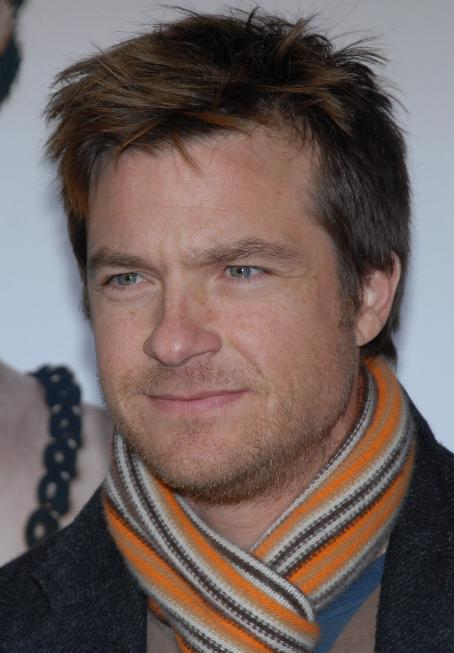
Jason Bateman, Best Actor in a Television Series – Musical or Comedy winner

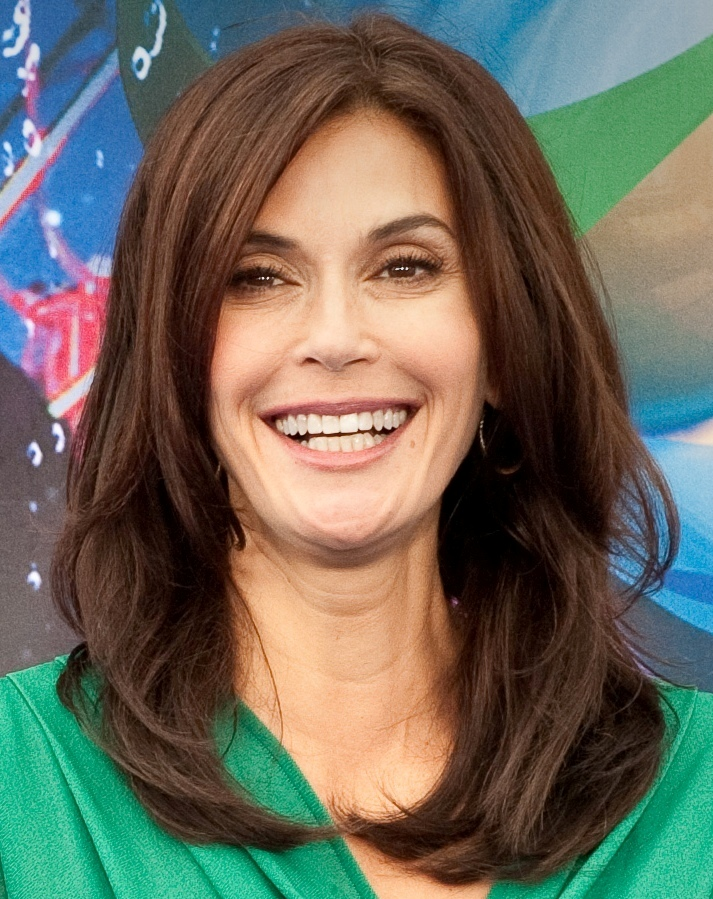
Teri Hatcher, Best Actress in a Television Series – Musical or Comedy winner

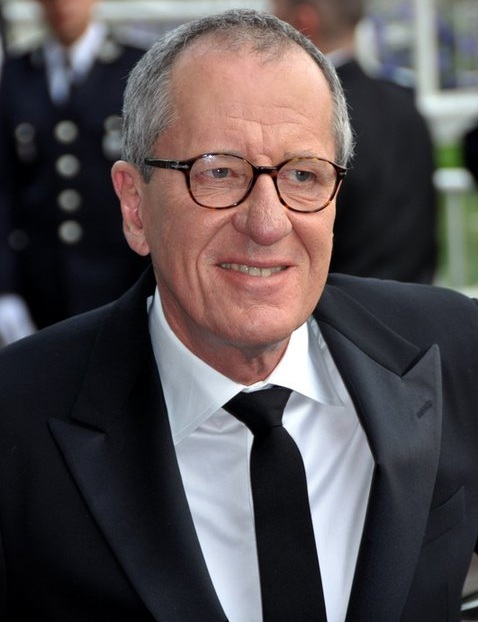
Geoffrey Rush, Best Actor in a Miniseries or Television Film winner

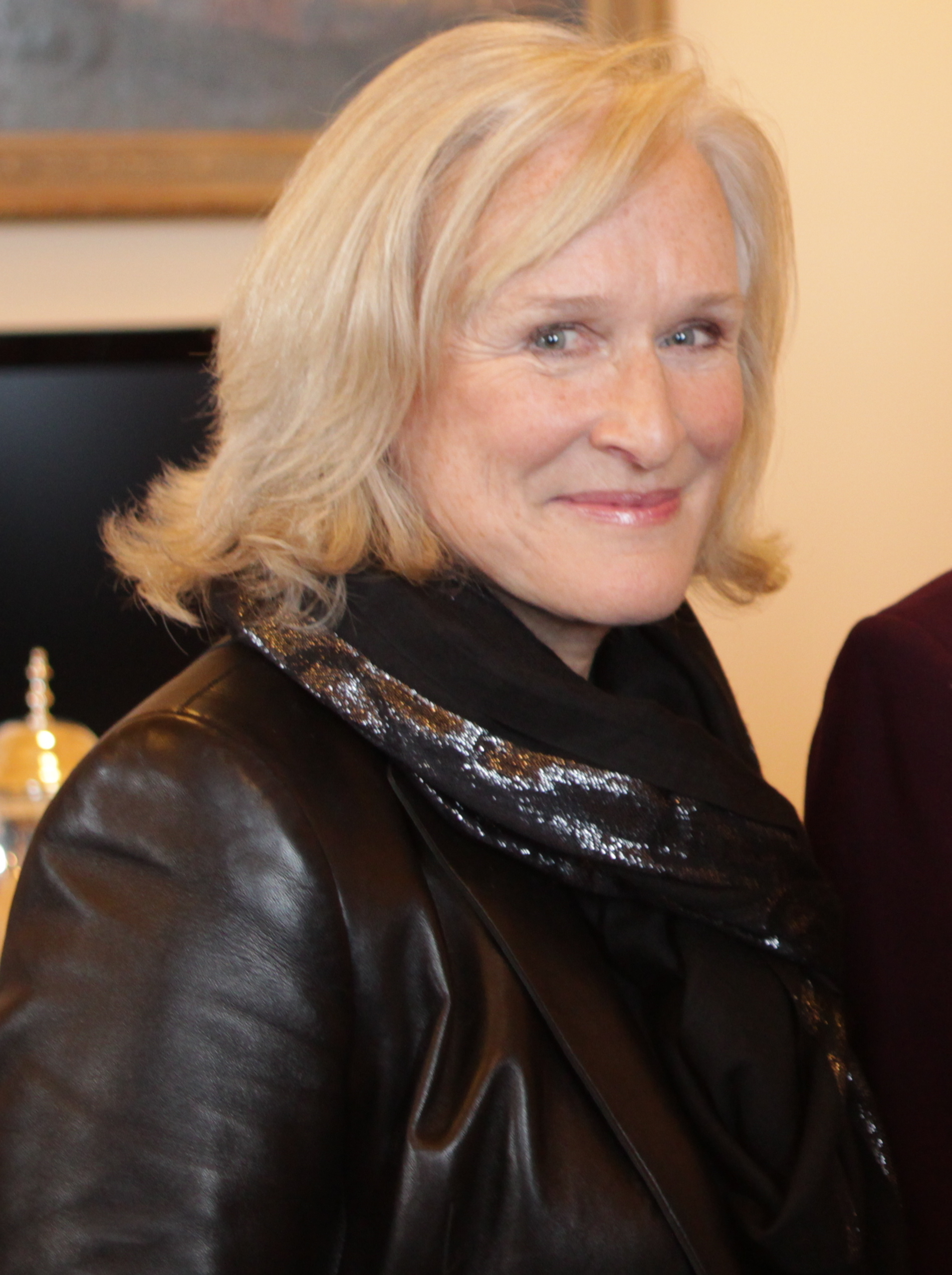
Glenn Close, Best Actress in a Miniseries or Television Film winner

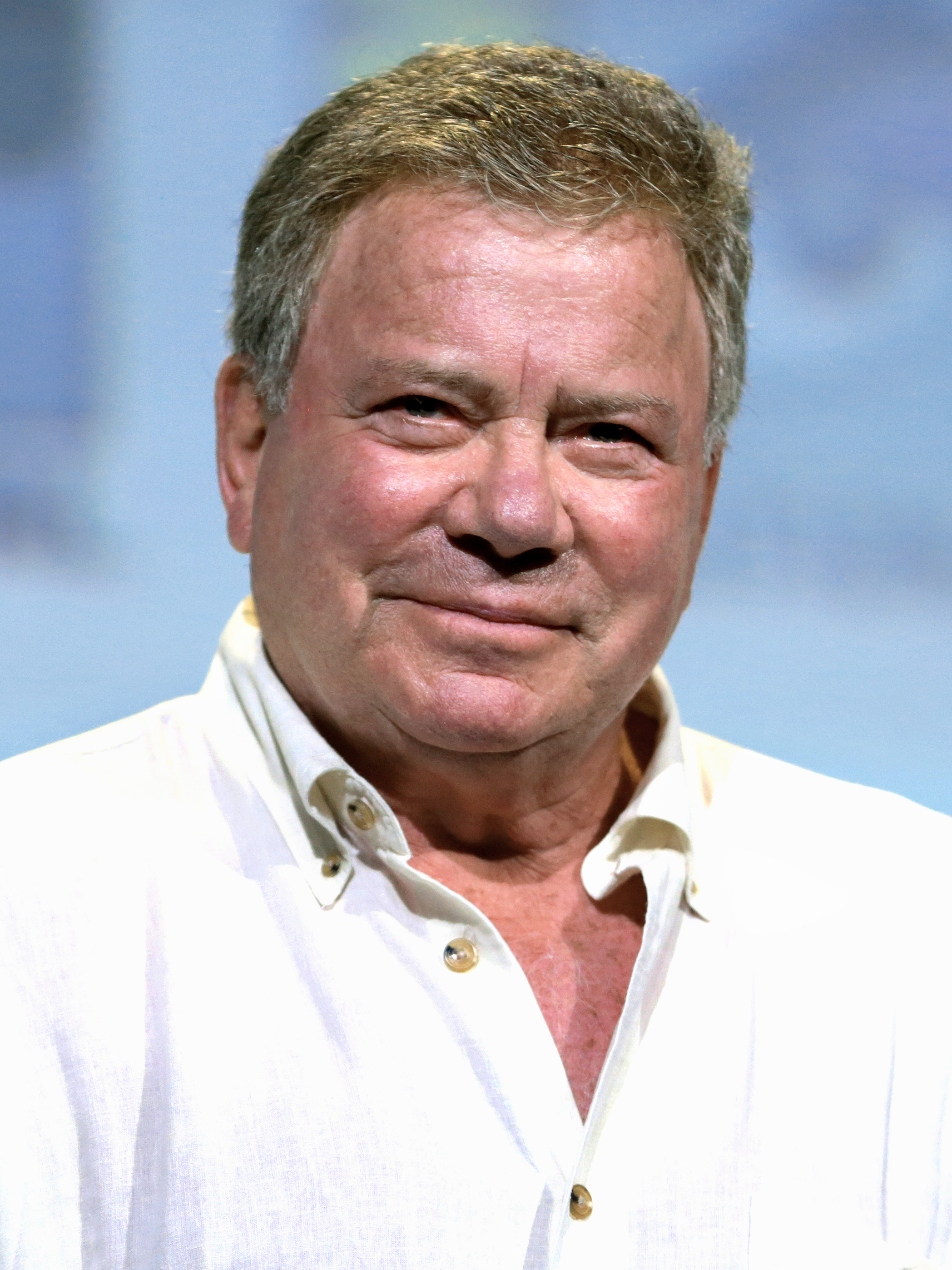
William Shatner, Best Supporting Actor in a Series, Miniseries, or Television Film winner

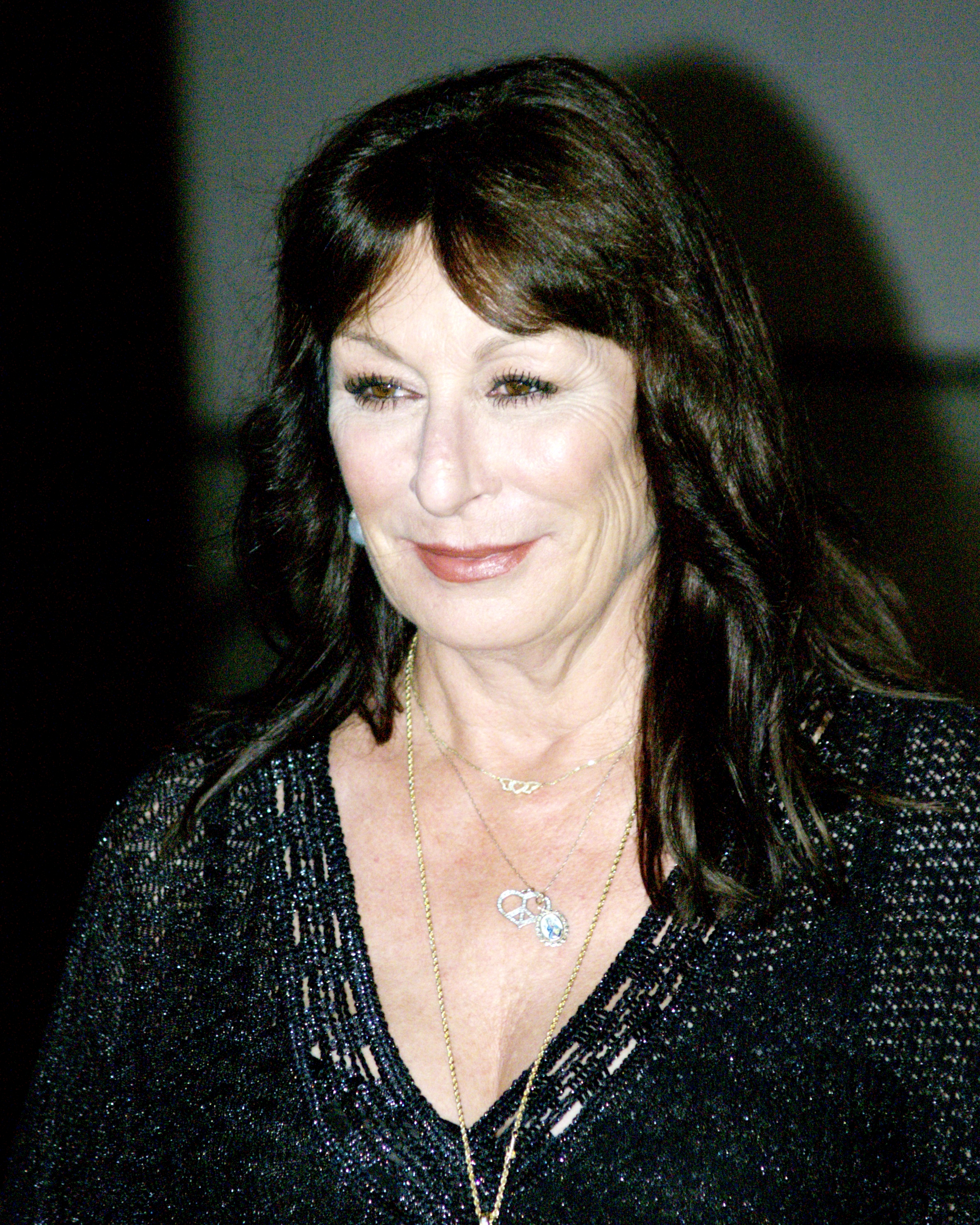
Anjelica Huston, Best Supporting Actress in a Series, Miniseries, or Television Film winner

These are the nominees for the 62nd Golden Globe Awards. Winners are listed at the top of each list.

=== Film ===
Best Motion Picture
Drama	Musical or Comedy
The Aviator; Closer; Finding Neverland; Hotel Rwanda; Kinsey; Million Dollar Baby	Sideways; Eternal Sunshine of the Spotless Mind; The Incredibles; The Phantom of the Opera; Ray
Best Performance in a Motion Picture – Drama
Actor	Actress
Leonardo DiCaprio – The Aviator as Howard Hughes; Javier Bardem – The Sea Inside as Ramón Sampedro; Don Cheadle – Hotel Rwanda as Paul Rusesabagina; Johnny Depp – Finding Neverland as J. M. Barrie; Liam Neeson – Kinsey as Alfred Kinsey	Hilary Swank – Million Dollar Baby as Margaret "Maggie" Fitzgerald; Scarlett Johansson – A Love Song for Bobby Long as Purslane Will; Nicole Kidman – Birth as Anna; Imelda Staunton – Vera Drake as Vera Drake; Uma Thurman – Kill Bill: Volume 2 as The Bride
Best Performance in a Motion Picture – Musical or Comedy
Actor	Actress
Jamie Foxx – Ray as Ray Charles; Jim Carrey – Eternal Sunshine of the Spotless Mind as Joel Barish; Paul Giamatti – Sideways as Miles Raymond; Kevin Kline – De-Lovely as Cole Porter; Kevin Spacey – Beyond the Sea as Bobby Darin	Annette Bening – Being Julia as Julia Lambert; Ashley Judd – De-Lovely as Linda Lee Thomas/Porter; Emmy Rossum – The Phantom of the Opera as Christine Daaé; Kate Winslet – Eternal Sunshine of the Spotless Mind as Clementine Kruczynski; Renée Zellweger – Bridget Jones: The Edge of Reason as Bridget Jones
Best Supporting Performance in a Motion Picture – Drama, Musical or Comedy
Supporting Actor	Supporting Actress
Clive Owen – Closer as Larry Gray; David Carradine – Kill Bill: Volume 2 as Bill; Thomas Haden Church – Sideways as Jack Cole; Jamie Foxx – Collateral as Max Durocher; Morgan Freeman – Million Dollar Baby as Eddie "Scrap-Iron" Dupris	Natalie Portman – Closer as Alice Ayres/Jane Jones; Cate Blanchett – The Aviator as Katharine Hepburn; Laura Linney – Kinsey as Clara McMillen; Virginia Madsen – Sideways as Maya Randall; Meryl Streep – The Manchurian Candidate as Senator Eleanor Prentiss Shaw
Best Director	Best Screenplay
Clint Eastwood – Million Dollar Baby; Marc Forster – Finding Neverland; Mike Nichols – Closer; Alexander Payne – Sideways; Martin Scorsese – The Aviator	Alexander Payne and Jim Taylor – Sideways; Charlie Kaufman – Eternal Sunshine of the Spotless Mind; John Logan – The Aviator; David Magee – Finding Neverland; Patrick Marber – Closer
Best Original Score	Best Original Song
Howard Shore – The Aviator; Clint Eastwood – Million Dollar Baby; Jan A. P. Kaczmarek – Finding Neverland; Rolfe Kent – Sideways; Hans Zimmer – Spanglish	"Old Habits Die Hard" (Mick Jagger and David A. Stewart) – Alfie; "Accidentally in Love" (Counting Crows) – Shrek 2; "Believe" (Glen Ballard and Alan Silvestri) – The Polar Express; "Learn to Be Lonely" (Charles Hart and Andrew Lloyd Webber) – The Phantom of the Opera; "Million Voices" (Jerry Duplessis, Andrea Guerra and Wyclef Jean) – Hotel Rwanda
Best Foreign Language Film	
The Sea Inside (Spain); A Very Long Engagement (France); The Chorus (France); House of Flying Daggers (China); The Motorcycle Diaries (Brazil)	

The following films received multiple nominations:

Nominations	Film
7	Sideways
6	The Aviator
5	Closer
5	Finding Neverland
5	Million Dollar Baby
4	Eternal Sunshine of the Spotless Mind
3	Hotel Rwanda
3	Kinsey
3	The Phantom of the Opera
2	De-Lovely
2	Kill Bill: Volume 2
2	Ray
2	The Sea Inside

The following films received multiple wins:

Wins	Film
3	The Aviator
2	Closer
2	Million Dollar Baby
2	Sideways

=== Television ===
Best Television Series
Drama	Musical or Comedy
Nip/Tuck (FX); 24 (Fox); Deadwood (HBO); Lost (ABC); The Sopranos (HBO)	Desperate Housewives (ABC); Arrested Development (Fox); Entourage (HBO); Sex and the City (HBO); Will & Grace (NBC)
Best Performance in a Television Series – Drama
Actor	Actress
Ian McShane – Deadwood (HBO) as Al Swearengen; Michael Chiklis – The Shield (FX) as Vic Mackey; Denis Leary – Rescue Me (FX) as Tommy Gavin; Julian McMahon – Nip/Tuck (FX) as Dr. Christian Troy; James Spader – Boston Legal (ABC) as Alan Shore	Mariska Hargitay – Law & Order: Special Victims Unit (NBC) as Det. Olivia Benson; Edie Falco – The Sopranos (HBO) as Carmela Soprano; Jennifer Garner – Alias (ABC) as Sydney Bristow; Christine Lahti – Jack & Bobby (The WB) as Professor Grace McCallister; Joely Richardson – Nip/Tuck (FX) as Julia McNamara
Best Performance in a Television Series – Musical or Comedy
Actor	Actress
Jason Bateman – Arrested Development (Fox) as Michael Bluth; Zach Braff – Scrubs (NBC) as Dr. John "J.D." Dorian; Larry David – Curb Your Enthusiasm (HBO) as Larry David; Matt LeBlanc – Joey (NBC) as Joey Tribbiani; Tony Shalhoub – Monk (USA Network) as Adrian Monk; Charlie Sheen – Two and a Half Men (CBS) as Charlie Harper	Teri Hatcher – Desperate Housewives (ABC) as Susan Mayer; Marcia Cross – Desperate Housewives (ABC) as Bree Van de Kamp; Felicity Huffman – Desperate Housewives (ABC) as Lynette Scavo; Debra Messing – Will & Grace (NBC) as Grace Adler; Sarah Jessica Parker – Sex and the City (HBO) as Carrie Bradshaw
Best Performance in a Miniseries or Television Film
Actor	Actress
Geoffrey Rush – The Life and Death of Peter Sellers (HBO) as Peter Sellers; Mos Def – Something the Lord Made (HBO) as Vivien Thomas; Jamie Foxx – Redemption: The Stan Tookie Williams Story (FX) as Stanley Tookie Williams; William H. Macy – The Wool Cap (TNT) as Charles Gigot; Patrick Stewart – The Lion in Winter (Showtime) as King Henry II	Glenn Close – The Lion in Winter (Showtime) as Queen Eleanor; Blythe Danner – Back When We Were Grownups (CBS) as Rebecca Davitch; Julianna Margulies – The Grid (TNT) as Maren Jackson; Miranda Richardson – The Lost Prince (PBS) as Queen Mary; Hilary Swank – Iron Jawed Angels (HBO) as Alice Paul
Best Supporting Performance in a Series, Miniseries or Television Film
Supporting Actor	Supporting Actress
William Shatner – Boston Legal (ABC) as Denny Crane; Sean Hayes – Will & Grace (NBC) as Jack McFarland; Michael Imperioli – The Sopranos (HBO) as Christopher Moltisanti; Jeremy Piven – Entourage (HBO) as Ari Gold; Oliver Platt – Huff (Showtime) as Russell Tupper	Anjelica Huston – Iron Jawed Angels (HBO) as Carrie Chapman Catt; Drea de Matteo – The Sopranos (HBO) as Adriana La Cerva; Nicollette Sheridan – Desperate Housewives (ABC) as Edie Britt; Charlize Theron – The Life and Death of Peter Sellers (HBO) as Britt Ekland; Emily Watson – The Life and Death of Peter Sellers (HBO) as Anne Sellers
Miniseries or Television Film
The Life and Death of Peter Sellers (HBO); American Family (PBS); Iron Jawed Angels (HBO); The Lion in Winter (Showtime); Something the Lord Made (HBO)

The following programs received multiple nominations:

Nominations	Series
5	Desperate Housewives
4	The Life and Death of Peter Sellers
4	The Sopranos
3	Iron Jawed Angels
3	The Lion in Winter
3	Nip/Tuck
3	Will & Grace
2	Arrested Development
2	Boston Legal
2	Deadwood
2	Entourage
2	Sex and the City
2	Something the Lord Made

The following programs received multiple wins:

Wins	Series
2	Desperate Housewives
2	The Life and Death of Peter Sellers

== Ceremony ==
=== Presenters ===
- Patricia Arquette
- Mischa Barton
- Halle Berry
- Pierce Brosnan
- Jim Carrey
- Glenn Close
- Marcia Cross
- Claire Danes
- Minnie Driver
- Will Ferrell
- Laurence Fishburne
- Jennifer Garner
- Topher Grace
- Teri Hatcher
- Goldie Hawn
- Dustin Hoffman
- Ron Howard
- Kate Hudson
- Felicity Huffman
- Michael Imperioli
- Samuel L. Jackson
- Scarlett Johansson
- Melina Kanakaredes
- Diane Keaton
- Nicole Kidman
- Diane Kruger
- Diane Lane
- Anthony LaPaglia
- Eva Longoria
- Matthew McConaughey
- Ewan McGregor
- Megan Mullally
- Mike Nichols
- Al Pacino
- Mekhi Phifer
- Lisa Marie Presley
- Prince
- Usher Raymond
- Tim Robbins
- Nicollette Sheridan
- Sylvester Stallone
- Meryl Streep
- Charlize Theron
- Goran Visnjic
- Mark Wahlberg
- Naomi Watts
- Renee Zellweger

=== Cecil B. DeMille Award ===
Robin Williams

=== Miss Golden Globe ===
Kathryn Eastwood (daughter of Clint Eastwood & Jacelyn Reeves)

== Awards breakdown ==
The following networks received multiple nominations:

Nominations	Network
20	HBO
9	ABC
6	FX
6	NBC
4	Fox
4	Showtime
2	CBS
2	PBS
2	TNT

The following networks received multiple wins:

Wins	Network
2	ABC
2	HBO

== See also ==
- 77th Academy Awards
- 25th Golden Raspberry Awards
- 11th Screen Actors Guild Awards
- 56th Primetime Emmy Awards
- 57th Primetime Emmy Awards
- 58th British Academy Film Awards
- 59th Tony Awards
- 2004 in film
- 2004 in American television
