= London United Investments =

Insurance company

London United Investments PLC (LUIS) was an insurance underwriting company based in London, United Kingdom. The company collapsed in 1990 in what was at the time the largest bankruptcy of an insurance company. London United Investments was a major player in the US casualty insurance market.

== Background ==
At the time of its collapse, London United Investments was the biggest insurer for US liability risks. The company is thought to have faulted under pressure from mounting claims in the US market, which resulted in the then biggest insurance failure.

LUIS's main insurance subsidiary, Walbrook, was stopped from trading by the Department of Trade and Industry (DTI) due to lack of funding in March 1990. Coopers & Lybrand were appointed as administrators. A joint investigation by the DTI and the Serious Fraud Office focussed on commission payments between Walbrook and HS Weavers, an underwriting agency that is also part of the LUIS group.

Investigations by the DTI found that between 1970 and 1989 around GBP 40 Million were wrongfully diverted to accounts in Liechtenstein and other locations and there were indications of some benefits derived by named individuals, but the investigations were inconclusive and no charges were brought. The report, however, resulted in debates amongst LUIS reinsurers.

The failure of LUIS caused some controversy in the UK as the source of the collapse was thought to be the US business which was underwritten in London and with subsequent claims on the UK Policyholder Protection Act, which the US businesses had not funded.

== Notable individuals ==
- Ronnie Driver - Director, CEO, father of the actress Minnie Driver
- Prince Michael of Kent - Director
