= Sleeping Dogs Lie (2005 film) =

- Directed by: Stuart Lessner
- Screenplay by: Chumahan Bowen
- Produced by: Nicholas Delfino; Stuart Lessner; Deb Raguse
- Starring: Brad Wilk; Ed Asner; Maynard James Keenan; Chelsea Field; Peter Looney
- Cinematography: Robert Gantz
- Edited by: Theodore Agathos; J.J. Jackson
- Music by: Jonny Polonsky
- Production company: Redrock Entertainment Development
- Distributed by: Avatar Productions
- Release date: February 28, 2005
- Running time: 29 minutes
- Country: United States
- Language: English

Sleeping Dogs Lie is a 2005 American drama film by writer Chumahan Bowen and director Stuart Lessner, starring Rage Against the Machine drummer Brad Wilk and Ed Asner. The film also features Tool lead singer Maynard James Keenan as Deputy Lance.

== Plot ==
After several weeks of haunting phone calls and strange happenings, Cincinnati, Ohio resident Jeff Hannon (Wilk) drives to Beuford, Texas to inform the local authorities-Sheriff Delaney (Asner) and Deputy Lance (Keenan)-that he has information on the 25-year-old unsolved murder of Priscilla Booth-a girl whose body was never found. At first, Delaney thinks Jeff is crazy, and doesn't take him seriously, but strange phone calls made to Hannon's cell phone, from "Priscilla," as well as it being apparent that Hannon is shaken up, convince Delaney to hear Jeff out. Delaney takes Hannon to lunch at Maggie's restaurant, where Jeff finishes his story, and the Sheriff agrees to put his mind at ease by taking him to where the phone calls told him the body would be, "The Tree in the Flats." They arrive at the scene, where Jeff starts digging, where he finds the remains. Sheriff Delaney then shoots Jeff and kills him, implying that Delaney is the one who killed Priscilla, and hid her body.

== Cast ==
- Brad Wilk as Jeff Hannon
- Ed Asner as Sheriff Delaney
- Maynard James Keenan as Deputy Lance
- Chelsea Field as Maggie
- Peter Looney as Old Timer
- Ione Inoke as Tow Truck Driver
- Annie Burgstede as Voice of Priscilla Booth
- Steven Brooks as Voice of Baret
- Kim Harris as Voice of Charlotte

== Production ==
Ed Asner and Maynard James Keenan joined the production after they read the script. Keenan was cast against type; originally, his role was minor, but it was expanded during filming. Shooting took place in Lancaster, California, in 2004.

== Release ==
Sleeping Dogs Lie premiered at the New York International Independent Film and Video Festival.

It was released on DVD on February 28, 2005.

== Reception ==
Dread Central gave the film 4.5 out of 5 stars, saying, "It isn't often that you find a short film with both a great script and such high production values. But Sleeping Dogs Lie is exactly that type of film."

=== Awards ===
Festival	Award
New York International Independent Film and Video Festival, 2005 Las Vegas event	Best Director (short)
New York International Independent Film and Video Festival, 2005 Miami event	Grand Jury Prize (short)
