= The Phantom of the Opera (2004 film) =

2004 film by Joel Schumacher

- Theatrical release poster
- Directed by: Joel Schumacher
- Screenplay by: Andrew Lloyd Webber; Joel Schumacher
- Based on: The Phantom of the Opera by Andrew Lloyd Webber; Charles Hart; Richard Stilgoe; The Phantom of the Opera by Gaston Leroux
- Produced by: Andrew Lloyd Webber
- Starring: Gerard Butler; Emmy Rossum; Patrick Wilson; Miranda Richardson; Minnie Driver
- Cinematography: John Mathieson
- Edited by: Terry Rawlings
- Music by: Andrew Lloyd Webber
- Production companies: Odyssey Entertainment; Joel Schumacher Productions; Really Useful Films; Scion Films
- Distributed by: Entertainment Film Distributors (United Kingdom); Warner Bros. Pictures (United States and Canada); Odyssey Entertainment (Overseas)
- Release dates: 10 December 2004 (United Kingdom); 22 December 2004 (United States)
- Running time: 144 minutes
- Countries: United Kingdom; United States
- Language: English
- Budget: $70–80 million
- Box office: $154.6 million

Andrew Lloyd Webber's The Phantom of the Opera, or simply The Phantom of the Opera, is a 2004 musical film based on Andrew Lloyd Webber's musical of the same name, itself an adaptation of Gaston Leroux's novel, The Phantom of the Opera. Produced and co-written by Lloyd Webber and directed by Joel Schumacher, the film stars Gerard Butler as the titular character, with Emmy Rossum, Patrick Wilson, Miranda Richardson, Minnie Driver, Simon Callow, Ciarán Hinds, Victor McGuire and Jennifer Ellison in supporting roles.

The film was announced in 1989, although production did not start until 2002 due to Lloyd Webber's divorce and Schumacher's busy career. It was shot entirely at Pinewood Studios, with scenery created with miniatures and computer graphics. Rossum, Wilson and Driver had singing experience, but Butler had none and was provided with music lessons prior to filming. The Phantom of the Opera grossed $154.6 million worldwide. It received mixed reviews from critics, with praise for the visuals and acting, particularly the performances of the lead actors, but criticism towards the writing, direction and unnecessary deviations from the source material. Despite its initial reception, the film received several awards and a trio of Academy Award nominations, as well as a positive reception from the audience.

== Plot ==
In 1870, a Parisian opera house prepares for the performance of the opera Hannibal, headed by soprano Carlotta Giudicelli. Theatre manager Monsieur Lefèvre plans to retire, leaving the building under the ownership of scrappers Richard Firmin and Gilles André, who introduce their patron, Viscount Raoul de Chagny. Carlotta refuses to perform due to being constantly tormented by the theatre's resident "Opera Ghost", who is said to live in the catacombs below. Facing the performance's cancellation, ballet mistress Madame Giry suggests that dancer Christine Daaé, Raoul's orphaned childhood sweetheart, stand in for Carlotta, who then demonstrates her outstanding singing talents and is a success on opening night.

Christine tells her best friend Meg, Giry's daughter, that she is being coached by an "Angel of Music" sent by her late father following his passing. Christine reunites with Raoul and confides that she has been visited by the Angel, but he dismisses her story. Soon after, the masked Opera Ghost, better known as the "Phantom" and revealed to be the Angel, appears before Christine in a mirror, leading her away to his underground lair. After the Phantom reveals a mannequin of Christine dressed in a wedding dress he made for her, she faints and is put asleep.

Once Christine awakens and sees the Phantom, she curiously removes his mask; he reacts violently and covers his face with his hand. After the duo have an understanding, the Phantom returns Christine to the theatre unharmed but orders the managers to make her the lead in Il Muto, only for them to choose the returning Carlotta instead. During the performance, the Phantom switches Carlotta's throat spray, causing her to sing out of tune, and Christine replaces her. The Phantom then encounters the stagehand and hangs him from above the stage. Christine and Raoul flee to the roof, declaring their love for each other. The Phantom, now heartbroken after witnessing the scene, vows revenge.

Three months later, Christine and Raoul announce their engagement at a New Year masquerade ball. The Phantom soon crashes the ball and orders his own opera, Don Juan Triumphant, to be performed. Upon seeing Christine's engagement ring, the Phantom steals it and flees, pursued by Raoul, but Giry thwarts him as she then privately discloses how she rescued the Phantom, once a much-abused and deformed young boy billed in a freak show, when she was younger. The next day, Christine visits her father's tomb with the Phantom posing as his spirit to win her back, but Raoul intervenes.

Raoul and the managers plan to capture the Phantom during his opera, but he usurps the lead tenor to get to Christine, who soon unmasks him during a duet and exposes his deformed face. The Phantom then abducts Christine and retreats as he causes the auditorium's chandelier to crash, sparking a building-wide inferno to cover his tracks. However, a mob aided by the gathered authorities forms to hunt him down. Giry leads Raoul to the Phantom's lair to rescue Christine, while Meg additionally leads the mob.

The Phantom has Christine wear the wedding dress and proposes marriage. Christine tries reasoning with him by confessing that she only fears his malicious actions, not his appearance. When Raoul arrives, the Phantom threatens his life unless Christine weds him, to which she kisses him out of pity. Moved by her compassion, the Phantom allows the couple to leave. Comforted by a music box, the Phantom is allowed to keep Christine's ring. He then escapes before the mob arrives, with Meg finding only his discarded mask.

Later in 1919, at a government auction held to clear out the now-condemned opera house's vaults, an elderly Raoul bids against the now-retired Giry for the Phantom's music box. Afterwards, he visits the recently deceased Christine's grave and places the instrument before it. Before leaving, he notices a freshly laid rose with Christine's ring around its stem, implying that the Phantom is still alive and will always love her.

== Cast ==
- Gerard Butler as The Phantom
- Emmy Rossum as Christine Daaé
- Patrick Wilson as Raoul de Chagny
- Miranda Richardson as Madame Giry
- Minnie Driver as Carlotta Giudicelli
  - Margaret Preece additionally provided the character's singing voice, with the exception of "Learn to Be Lonely"
- Simon Callow as Gilles André
- Ciarán Hinds as Richard Firmin
- Victor McGuire as Ubaldo Piangi
- Jennifer Ellison as Meg Giry
- Murray Melvin as Ernest Reyer
- Kevin McNally as Joseph Buquet
- James Fleet as Monsieur Lefèvre
- Ramin Karimloo as Gustave Daaé
- Paul Brooke as the auctioneer in the film's prologue

== Production ==
=== Development ===
Warner Bros. Pictures purchased the film rights to The Phantom of the Opera in early 1989, granting Andrew Lloyd Webber total artistic control. Despite interest from A-list directors, Lloyd Webber and Warner Bros. instantly hired Joel Schumacher to direct; Lloyd Webber had been impressed with Schumacher's use of music in The Lost Boys. The duo wrote the screenplay that same year, while Michael Crawford and Sarah Brightman were cast to reprise their roles from the original stage production. Filming was set to begin at Pinewood Studios in England in July 1990, under a $25 million budget.

However, the start date was pushed to November 1990 at both Babelsberg Studios in Potsdam, Germany and Barrandov Studios in Prague, Czech Republic. Production for The Phantom of the Opera was stalled with Lloyd Webber and Brightman's divorce. "Everything got tied up in settlements", Schumacher reflected. "Then my career took off and I was really busy." As a result, The Phantom of the Opera languished in development limbo for Warner Bros. throughout the 1990s. In February 1997, Schumacher considered returning, but eventually dropped out in favour of Batman Unchained, Runaway Jury and Dreamgirls. The studio was keen to cast John Travolta for the lead role, but also held discussions with Antonio Banderas, who undertook vocal preparation and sang the role of the Phantom in the TV special Andrew Lloyd Webber: The Royal Albert Hall Celebration.

Schumacher and Lloyd Webber restarted development for The Phantom of the Opera in December 2002. It was then announced in January 2003 that Lloyd Webber's Really Useful Group had purchased the film rights from Warner Bros. in an attempt to produce The Phantom of the Opera independently. As a result, Lloyd Webber invested $6 million of his own money. The Phantom of the Opera was produced on an $80 million budget. Warner Bros. was given a first-look deal for distribution; when the principal cast was chosen in June 2003, Warner Bros. paid under $8 million to acquire the North American distribution rights.

=== Casting ===
Hugh Jackman was among those considered for the role of Phantom, but he faced scheduling conflicts with Van Helsing. "They rang to ask about my availability", Jackman explained in an April 2003 interview, "probably about 20 other actors as well. I wasn't available, unfortunately. So, that was a bummer." "We needed somebody who has a bit of rock and roll sensibility in him", Andrew Lloyd Webber explained. "He's got to be a bit rough, a bit dangerous; not a conventional singer. Christine is attracted to the Phantom because he's the right side of danger." Director Joel Schumacher had been impressed with Gerard Butler's performance in Dracula 2000. Prior to his audition, Butler had no professional singing experience and had only taken four voice lessons before singing "The Music of the Night" for Lloyd Webber.

Katie Holmes, who began working with a vocal coach, was the front-runner for Christine Daaé in March 2003. She was later replaced by Anne Hathaway, a classically trained soprano, in 2004. However, Hathaway dropped out of the role because the production schedule of the film overlapped with The Princess Diaries 2: Royal Engagement, which she was contractually obligated to make. Hathaway was then replaced with Emmy Rossum. The actress modeled the relationship between the Phantom and Christine after Suzanne Farrell and George Balanchine. Patrick Wilson was cast as Raoul based on his previous Broadway theatre career. For the role of Carlotta, Minnie Driver devised an over-the-top and campy performance as the egotistical prima donna. Despite also lacking singing experience, Ciarán Hinds was cast by Schumacher as Richard Firmin; the two had previously worked together on Veronica Guerin. Ramin Karimloo, who later played the Phantom as well as Raoul on London's West End, briefly appears as the portrait of Gustave Daaé, Christine's father.

=== Filming ===
Principal photography lasted from 15 September 2003 to 15 January 2004. The film was shot entirely using eight sound stages at Pinewood Studios, where, on the Pinewood backlot, the bottom half exterior of the opera house was constructed. The top half was implemented using a combination of computer-generated imagery and a scale model created by Cinesite. The surrounding skyline seen during the "Why Have You Brought Me Here?/Raoul, I've Been There" and "All I Ask of You" sequences was entirely composed of matte paintings. Cinesite additionally created a miniature version of the auditorium's chandelier used for its fall, since the life-size model was too big for the actual set.

Production designer Anthony D. G. Pratt was influenced by French architect Charles Garnier, designer of the original Paris opera house, as well as Edgar Degas, John Singer Sargent, Gustave Caillebotte, the Pre-Raphaelite Brotherhood and Dante Gabriel Rossetti. Schumacher was inspired by Jean Cocteau's Beauty and the Beast (1946) and featured a hallway lined with candelabra-holding arms. The cemetery was based on the Père Lachaise and Montparnasse. Costume designer Alexandra Byrne used a limited black, white, gold and silver color palette for the "Masquerade" sequence in spite of the lyrics indicating that it is a multicolored affair in which mauve, puce, green and yellow are some of the colors worn by attendees.

== Reception ==
=== Release ===
The Phantom of the Opera was released in the United Kingdom on 10 December 2004 and the United States on 22 December 2004. With a limited release of 622 theaters, it opened at tenth place at the weekend box office, grossing $6.3 million across five days. After expanding to 907 screens on 14 January 2005 the film obtained the 9th spot at the box office, which it retained during its 1,511 screens wide release on 21 January 2005. The total domestic gross was $51.2 million. With a further $107 million earned internationally, The Phantom of the Opera reached a worldwide total of $154.6 million. A few foreign markets were particularly successful, such as Japan, where the film's ¥4.20 billion ($35 million) gross stood as the 6th most successful foreign film and 9th overall of the year. The United Kingdom and South Korea both had over $10 million in receipts, with $17.5 million and $11.9 million, respectively.

=== Accolades ===
Anthony Pratt and Celia Bobak were nominated for the Academy Award for Best Art Direction, as was John Mathieson for Best Cinematography. However, both categories were awarded to The Aviator. Andrew Lloyd Webber and lyricist Charles Hart were nominated for the Academy Award for Best Original Song ("Learn to Be Lonely") but lost to "Al otro lado del río" from The Motorcycle Diaries. The song was also nominated for the Golden Globe but it lost to Alfie's "Old Habits Die Hard". In the same ceremony, Emmy Rossum was nominated for Best Actress in a Motion Picture Musical or Comedy, losing to Annette Bening in Being Julia. At the Saturn Awards, Rossum won for Best Performance by a Younger Actor, while The Phantom of the Opera was nominated for Best Action/Adventure/Thriller Film and Alexandra Byrne was nominated for Costume Design.

Year	Award	Category	Nominated work	Result
2004	Academy Awards	Best Art Direction	Anthony Pratt (art director); Celia Bobak (set decorator)	Nominated
2004	Academy Awards	Best Cinematography	John Mathieson	Nominated
2004	Academy Awards	Best Original Song	Andrew Lloyd Webber (composer); Charles Hart (lyricist); For the song "Learn To Be Lonely"	Nominated
2004	Golden Globe Awards	Best Musical or Comedy – Motion Picture	The Phantom of the Opera	Nominated
2004	Golden Globe Awards	Best Actress – Musical or Comedy	Emmy Rossum	Nominated
2004	Golden Globe Awards	Best Original Song	Andrew Lloyd Webber (music); Charles Hart (lyrics); Song: "Learn to Be Lonely"	Nominated
2004	Saturn Awards	Best Action/Adventure/Thriller Film	The Phantom of the Opera	Nominated
2004	Saturn Awards	Best Performance by a Younger Actor	Emmy Rossum	Won
2004	Saturn Awards	Best Costumes	Alexandra Byrne	Nominated
2004	British Society of Cinematographers	Best Cinematography	John Mathieson	Won
2004	San Diego Film Critics Society Awards	Best Cinematography	John Mathieson	Won
2004	Critics' Choice Awards	Best Picture	The Phantom of the Opera	Nominated
2004	Critics' Choice Awards	Critics' Choice Movie Award for Best Young Performer	Emmy Rossum	Won
2005	Satellite Awards	Best Actress in a Motion Picture, Comedy or Musical	Emmy Rossum	Nominated
2005	Satellite Awards	Best Actor in a Motion Picture, Comedy or Musical	Gerard Butler	Nominated
2005	Satellite Awards	Best Actress in a Supporting Role, Comedy or Musical	Minnie Driver	Nominated
2005	Satellite Awards	Best Actor in a Supporting Role, Comedy or Musical	Patrick Wilson	Nominated
2005	Satellite Awards	Best Motion Picture, Comedy or Musical	The Phantom of the Opera	Nominated
2005	Satellite Awards	Best Original Song	Andrew Lloyd Webber ("Learn to Be Lonely")	Nominated
2005	Satellite Awards	Best Cinematography	John Mathieson	Nominated
2005	Satellite Awards	Best Sound (Editing & Mixing)	Tony Dawe Andy Nelson Anna Behlmer Martin Evans	Nominated
2005	Satellite Awards	Best Art Direction/Production Design	Anthony Pratt Celia Bobak	Nominated
2005	Satellite Awards	Best Costume Design	Alexandra Byrne	Nominated
2005	Satellite Awards	Best Screenplay, Adapted	Andrew Lloyd Webber Joel Schumacher	Nominated
2005	London Critics Circle Film Awards	British Supporting Actress of the Year	Minnie Driver	Nominated
2005	Motion Picture Sound Editors	Best Sound Editing in Feature Film - Music - Musical	Yann McCullough	Nominated
2005	National Board of Review	Breakthrough Performance by an Actress	Emmy Rossum	Won
2005	Online Film Critics Society Awards	Best Breakthrough Performance	Emmy Rossum	Nominated
2005	Art Directors Guild	Period or Fantasy Film	Anthony Pratt John Fenner Paul Kirby Anthony Caron-Delion Iain McFadyen	Nominated
2005	Young Artist Awards	Best Performance in a Feature Film - Leading Young Actress	Emmy Rossum	Won
2005	Young Artist Awards	Best Family Feature Film - Comedy or Musical	The Phantom of the Opera	Nominated
2005	Visual Effects Society Awards	Outstanding Created Environment in a Live Action Motion Picture	Claas Henke Laurent Ben-Mimoun Anupam Das	Nominated
2005	Visual Effects Society Awards	Outstanding Compositing in a Motion Picture	Claas Henke Laurent Ben-Mimoun Anupam Das	Nominated

=== Critical reception ===
On the review aggregator website Rotten Tomatoes, the film has an approval rating of 33%, based on reviews from 171 critics, with an average score of 5.01/10. The site's critical consensus reads: "The music of the night has hit something of a sour note: critics are calling the screen adaptation of Andrew Lloyd Webber's popular musical histrionic, boring and lacking in both romance and danger. Still, some have praised the film for its sheer spectacle." On Metacritic it has a weighted average score of 40 out of 100 based on 39 reviews, indicating "mixed or average reviews". Audiences polled by CinemaScore gave the film an average grade of "A" on an A+ to F scale.

"The film looks and sounds fabulous and I think it's an extraordinarily fine document of the stage show. While it doesn't deviate much from the stage material, the film has given it an even deeper emotional centre. It's not based on the theatre visually or direction-wise, but it's still got exactly the same essence. And that's all I could have ever hoped for."

— Andrew Lloyd Webber

Despite having been impressed with the cast, Jonathan Rosenbaum of the Chicago Reader wrote that "Teen romance and operetta-style singing replace the horror elements familiar to film-goers, and director Joel Schumacher obscures any remnants of classy stage spectacle with the same disco overkill he brought to Batman Forever." Stephanie Zacharek of Salon.com believed that Phantom of the Opera "takes everything that's wrong with Broadway and puts it on the big screen in a gaudy splat."

In a mixed review for Newsweek, David Ansen praised Rossum's performance, but criticized the filmmakers for their focus on visual design rather than presenting a cohesive storyline. "Its kitschy romanticism bored me on Broadway and it bores me here—I may not be the most reliable witness. Still, I can easily imagine a more dashing, charismatic Phantom than Butler's. Rest assured, however, Lloyd Webber's neo-Puccinian songs are reprised and reprised and reprised until you're guaranteed to go out humming." Owen Gleiberman of Entertainment Weekly believed Schumacher did not add enough dimension in adapting The Phantom of the Opera. "Schumacher, the man who added nipples to Batman's suit, has staged Phantom chastely, as if his job were to adhere the audience to every note".

Roger Ebert, who gave the film three stars out of four, reasoned that "part of the pleasure of movie-going is pure spectacle—of just sitting there and looking at great stuff and knowing it looks terrific. There wasn't much Schumacher could have done with the story or the music he was handed, but in the areas over which he held sway, he has triumphed." In contrasting between the popularity of the Broadway musical, Michael Dequina of Film Threat magazine explained that "it conjures up this unexplainable spell that leaves audiences sad, sentimental, swooning, smiling—in some way transported and moved. Now, in Schumacher's film, that spell lives on."

In a 2013 interview with Hollywood.com, Cameron Mackintosh, a co-producer on the stage musical who had nothing to do with this movie, said "I would have wanted to do the film differently. This new version which we’ve done (a touring production with reimagined staging) is dangerous and gritty. It combines the world of upstage and the lair below. You see two different worlds. That would have been my approach to the film." In a 2021 interview with Variety, Andrew Lloyd Webber revealed that he personally felt director Joel Schumacher made a mistake in casting Gerard Butler. He said, "The Phantom was too young, and the whole point of the Phantom is he needs to be quite a bit older than Christine."

== Possible remake ==
In June 2025, Lloyd Webber revealed that a remake of the film is in the early stages of development. While not revealing potential directors or actors, he suggested that he would like to see "somebody who is in their early 40s" play the Phantom in the new film.

== See also ==
- The Phantom of the Opera (2004 soundtrack)

== Sources ==
- Andrew Lloyd Webber (writer), Joel Schumacher (director) (2005). "The Making of The Phantom of the Opera". The Phantom of the Opera (DVD). Warner Home Video.
