= Learn to Be Lonely =

Song composed by Andrew Lloyd Webber

"Learn to Be Lonely" is a song written by Andrew Lloyd Webber and Charles Hart for the 2004 film adaptation of The Phantom of the Opera. The song is performed by Minnie Driver during the closing credits and is found on the film's soundtrack. It was nominated for the Academy Award for Best Original Song at the 77th Academy Awards and the Golden Globe at the 62nd Golden Globe Awards in 2004.

Another song using the melody of Learn to be Lonely entitled No One Would Listen (with lyrics by David Zippel) was originally included in the film, to be sung by Gerard Butler (The Phantom), but was ultimately cut.

This is the only song in the film or on its soundtrack to feature Minnie Driver, who played Carlotta in the film, actually singing; the character's opera voice was given by Margaret Preece (who played Carlotta in the stage musical at one time and had a bit part in the film as Carlotta's confidante).

Beyoncé performed the song at the 2005 Oscars (she performed all of that year's nominees for Best Original Song requiring female lead vocals) with Lloyd Webber accompanying on piano. Minnie Driver performed the song during her appearance on The Ellen DeGeneres Show.

The song was included in the 2025 immersive New York based production of the musical, Masquerade. In this adaptation, Madame Giry sings a young phantom after she rescues him from a circus freak act.
