= Seastories =

Studio album by Minnie Driver
- Released: 17 July 2007
- Genre: Pop, folk
- Length: 46:35
- Label: Zoë (US), Decca/Rounder (UK)

Minnie Driver chronology
Everything I've Got in My Pocket (2004)	Seastories (2007)	Ask Me to Dance (2014)

Professional ratings
Review scores
Source	Rating
AllMusic	3/5 stars

Seastories is the second studio album by actress Minnie Driver, released in 2007. The album features collaborations with Ryan Adams, Neal Casal and Liz Phair. The album peaked at No. 25 on Billboard's Top Heatseekers Chart.

== Track listing ==
1. "Stars & Satellites"
2. "Sorry Baby" (feat. Liz Phair)
3. "Beloved"
4. "Cold Dark River"
5. "Mockingbird"
6. "How to Be Good"
7. "King Without a Queen"
8. "Mary"
9. "Lakewater Hair"
10. "London Skies"
11. "Coming Back to Life"
12. "Love Is Love"
13. "Complicated Man"
