= Ask Me to Dance (Minnie Driver album) =

Third studio album by actor and singer Minnie Driver, and was released in 2014

Studio album by Minnie Driver
- Released: 7 October 2014
- Genre: Folk
- Length: 35:34
- Label: Zoë
- Producer: Marc Dauer

Minnie Driver chronology
Seastories (2007)	Ask Me to Dance (2014)

Professional ratings
Review scores
Source	Rating
AllMusic	link

Ask Me to Dance is the third studio album by actor and singer Minnie Driver, and was released in 2014.

== Track listing ==
No.	Title	Writer(s)	Length
1.	"Waltz #2 (XO)"	Elliott Smith	4:15
2.	"Close to Me"	Robert Smith	3:10
3.	"Master Blaster (Jammin')"	Stevie Wonder	3:36
4.	"Human"	Brandon Flowers, Dave Keuning, Mark Stoermer, Ronnie Vannucci Jr.	3:37
5.	"Fly Me to the Moon"	Bart Howard	2:57
6.	"Better Be Home Soon"	Neil Finn	3:21
7.	"Wild Wood"	Paul Weller	4:15
8.	"Tell Me Why"	Neil Young	3:01
9.	"Speed of the Sound of Loneliness"	John Prine	3:23
10.	"Love Song"	Lesley Duncan	3:59
Total length:			35:34
