= Margaret Preece =

British operatic soprano

Margaret Preece is an English operatic soprano who has performed internationally in opera as well as musical theatre productions.

== Career ==
Preece trained at the Royal Conservatoire of Scotland, and has worked with the Scottish Opera and Opera North. She had leading roles in the English National Opera's productions of The Cunning Little Vixen, Don Giovanni, and The Love for Three Oranges. In 2005 she portrayed the title role in Carl Rosa Company's production of The Merry Widow. In 2007 she starred in the West End revival of The Sound of Music as the Mother Abbess, replacing Lesley Garrett. In the late 1990s, she starred as Carlotta in The Phantom of the Opera at Her Majesty's Theatre in London for 18 months. Preece recorded the operatic singing voice for Carlotta in the 2004 film The Phantom of the Opera, over-dubbing for Minnie Driver. Originally from Solihull, she left the Birmingham & Midland Operatic Society in the 1970s to tour Europe.

In 2008 Margaret Preece released an album called Isn't It Romantic, which features songs by Richard Rodgers with lyrics by both Lorenz Hart and Oscar Hammerstein, including Isn't It Romantic?.

Following the closure of The Sound Of Music, she played Vava in Opera North's production of Paradise Moscow in spring 2009. There were performances in Leeds, Newcastle, Salford (the Lowry), Nottingham and Bregenz. In the summer, Preece reprised her role as the Mother Abbess in the UK Tour of The Sound of Music, including performances at the Wales Millennium Centre.

In 2022, Preece played the role of the strict Mother Superior in the musical Sister Act with the English Theatre Frankfurt.

== Reception ==
=== Musical theatre ===
In 2009, the Western Mail said in a review of The Sound of Music that "Margaret Preece as the Mother Abbess could probably shatter the chandelier on the centre of the stage with her amazing soprano voice."

In 2022, the Frankfurter Allgemeine Zeitung said that Margaret Preece was one of the singers in Sister Act who would be thrilling even if they were only singing a telephone book".

=== Opera ===
A 2003 review in The Spectator said Preece's turn as Rosalinda in Die Fledermaus with the English Touring Opera "stands out" in "a superb ensemble effort". The Independent found Preece "vocally lustrous" in the Garsington Festival production of Il mondo della luna in 2000.

== Stage repertoire ==
- Varochka and Vava in Paradise Moscow (spring 2009)
- Sister Sophia and Mother Abbess in The Sound of Music
- Carlotta in The Phantom of the Opera
- Donna Elvira and Zerlina in Don Giovanni
- Fiordiligi and Despina in Così fan tutte
- The Queen of the Night and Papagena in The Magic Flute
- Adina in L'Elisir D'Amore
- Alice Ford in Falstaff
- Musetta in La bohème
- Ninetta in The Love for Three Oranges
- Rosalinda in Die Fledermaus
- Clarice and Flamina in Il mondo della luna
- Oriana in Amadigi
- Susan Cooper in Love Life
- Mary Turner in Of Thee I Sing
- Bacchae and Hanna Glawari in The Merry Widow
- Mother Superior in Sister Act

== Film ==
- Operatic singing voice for Carlotta and the Confidante in The Phantom of the Opera (2004)
