= Charles Hart (lyricist) =

English lyricist, librettist and songwriter (born 1961)

- Born: 1961 (age 64–65); London, England
- Occupations: Lyricist, librettist, songwriter
- Parent(s): George Wilson Hart; Juliet Lavinia (née Byam Shaw)

Charles Hart is an English lyricist, librettist and songwriter. He is perhaps best known for his work on The Phantom of the Opera as well as a number of other musicals and operas for both stage and television.

== Life and works ==
Hart was born in London in 1961, the son of George Wilson Hart, an antiquarian book dealer, and Juliet Lavinia Hart (née Byam Shaw), actress. His parents had met as actors through theatre but his maternal grand-parents, Glen Byam Shaw and Angela Baddeley, continued actively working in theatre and music throughout his childhood. Hart began writing lyrics as a child, some of which were "dark and contemplative – precociously murderous and quite, quite feisty". He went to school in Maidenhead over the same period when his grandmother was starring in a London stage production of Stephen Sondheim's A Little Night Music. Hart went on to study music at Robinson College, Cambridge, followed by postgraduate studies at the Guildhall School of Music and Drama in music composition in 1984. Soon after leaving Guildhall, Hart came to the attention of Andrew Lloyd Webber and Cameron Mackintosh, while they were judging the Vivian Ellis awards. Webber hired him as a lyricist for The Phantom of the Opera a year later, which opened in 1986. In an interview published the day before the opening of Phantom, Hart said, "my ambition was to be an English Sondheim. Being a lyricist is the ideal job for a university-educated dilettante, because it uses up all the rubbish in your education."

In 1990, during Stephen Sondheim’s tenure as “Professor of Musical Theatre” at Oxford, Hart linked up with like-minded writers George Stiles, Anthony Drewe and Howard Goodall, and in 1992, they founded the Mercury Workshop. The collaborative merged with the New Musical Alliance to become Mercury Musical Developments in 1999 and is today a registered charity whose patron was Stephen Sondheim. Hart went on to collaborate with Howard Goodall on a number of successful musicals.

== Selected works ==
=== Musical theatre ===
- 1984 – Book and music for Moll Flanders– competition entry to Vivian Ellis Award
- 1986 – Lyrics for Phantom of the Opera with music by Lloyd Webber
- 1989 – Lyrics for Aspects of Love (co-written with Don Black) with music by Lloyd Webber
- 1998 – Book and lyrics for The Kissing Dance with music by Howard Goodall
- 2001 – Book and lyrics for The Dreaming with music by Howard Goodall
- 2015 – Lyrics for Bend It Like Beckham with music by Howard Goodall

=== Operas ===
- 1992 – Libretto for The Vampyr, music by Heinrich Marschner, directed by Nigel Finch for the BBC
- 2014 – Libretto for Benvenuto Cellini, music by Hector Berlioz, performed by ENO, directed by Terry Gilliam
- 2018 – Libretto for Marx in London, music by Jonathan Dove, performed at Stadttheater Bonn

=== Songs ===
- 1998 – Lyrics and music for Love Songs, a song-cycle performed by Marie-Louise Clarke for BBC Radio
- 1999 – Lyrics for ‘’’The Years Rolled By’’’, music by Jake Heggie, sung by Kiri Te Kanawa and Frederica von Stade
- 2007 – Lyrics for Goodbye For Now music by Richard Rodney Bennett, sung by Claire Martin
- 2013 – Lyrics for Seventeen music by Claude-Michel Schönberg, sung by Russell Watson
- 2017 – Lyrics for ‘’’This Life’’’ original German version Michael Kunze and Sylvester Levay, performed by Pia Douwes

=== Film and Broadcast ===
- 1987 – Lyrics and music for Watching for Granada TV, sung by Emma Wray
- 1989 – Lyrics and music for Split Ends for Granada TV, sung by Anita Dobson
- 1992 – Libretto for The Vampyr: A Soap Opera, a miniseries for BBC

== Awards ==
Hart has received two Ivor Novello Awards. He was nominated twice for the Tony Award, Best Original Score, for Aspects of Love (1990) and The Phantom of the Opera (1988). He was also nominated for an Academy Award for writing the lyrics to a new song "Learn to be Lonely" which was sung by Minnie Driver over the final credits to the film version of The Phantom of the Opera.
