= Minnie Driver =

British and American actress (born 1970)

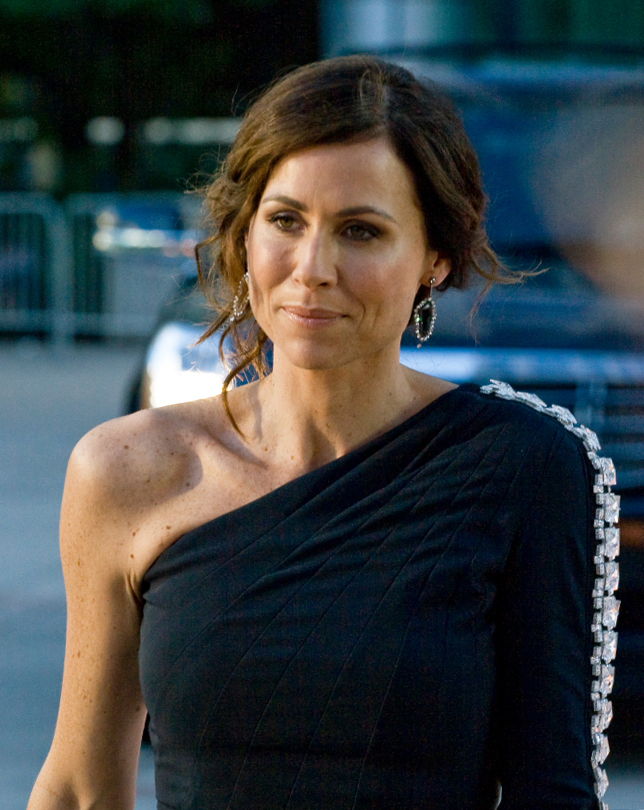
- Driver in 2010
- Born: Amelia Fiona Jessica Driver; 31 January 1970 (age 56); London, England
- Citizenship: UK; US
- Education: Webber Douglas Academy of Dramatic Art
- Occupations: Actress; singer
- Years active: 1991–present
- Partner(s): Addison O'Dea (2019–present; engaged)
- Children: 1

Amelia Fiona Jessica "Minnie" Driver (born 31 January 1970) is a British and American actress and singer. She rose to prominence with her break-out role in the 1995 film Circle of Friends. She went on to star in a wide range of films, including the cult classic Grosse Pointe Blank; Good Will Hunting (for which she was nominated for both the Academy Award for Best Supporting Actress and a Screen Actors Guild Award); the musical The Phantom of the Opera; and Owning Mahowny. She also provided the voice of Lady Eboshi in Hayao Miyazaki's Princess Mononoke.

In television, Driver starred with Suzy Eddie Izzard in The Riches, for which she was nominated for both an Emmy and a Golden Globe. She starred in the ABC sitcom Speechless, the NBC sitcom About a Boy and had a recurring role in the NBC series Will & Grace. She has also starred in several British dramas, including The Deep for BBC One.

Before she began working as an actress, Driver was a singer; she has released three full solo albums in the course of her career. She has also lent her voice to a variety of animated series and films, including SuperMansion and Tarzan, and video games, including Jurassic Park: Trespasser.

== Early life and education ==
Amelia Fiona Jessica Driver was born in London on 31 January 1970, and was raised in Barbados until she was six. The nickname Minnie was given to her by her elder sister, Kate, in childhood because Kate could not pronounce "Amelia".

Her mother, Gaynor Churchward (née Millington), was a fabric designer and former couture model. Her father, Charles Ronald Driver, was born in Swansea, Wales, and was of English and Scottish descent. He earned the Distinguished Flying Medal for his role in the Battle of Heligoland Bight and was a director of London United Investments.

Her parents never married. Her father was married to another woman throughout his relationship with her mother. Her parents broke off their relationship when she was six years old. She was sent to Bedales School in Hampshire as a boarder soon after. She later attended the Webber Douglas Academy of Dramatic Art, and Collingham College in Kensington, Central London.

== Career ==
=== Acting ===
Driver's television debut was in a 1991 TV advertisement for Right Guard deodorant. Driver also made her stage debut in 1991, supplementing her income by performing as a jazz vocalist and guitarist. In 1993, she featured in an episode of Maigret, alongside Michael Gambon and Michael Sheen. Also in 1993, she played alongside Jonathan Pryce in the mini-series Mr Wroe's Virgins. She appeared in The Day Today, on British television, with comedian Steve Coogan and for satirist Armando Iannucci, and had small parts in Casualty, The House of Eliott, Lovejoy and Peak Practice.

Driver gained broader public attention when she played the lead role in Circle of Friends in 1995, opposite Chris O'Donnell. She followed this with a minor role in GoldenEye (1995), a supporting role in Sleepers (1996), a leading role in Big Night (1996), and as a co-star in Grosse Pointe Blank (1997), opposite John Cusack.

Driver played opposite Matt Damon as Skylar in the drama Good Will Hunting (1997), for which she was nominated for an Academy Award for Best Supporting Actress and a Screen Actors Guild Award.

In 1998, Driver starred in Sandra Goldbacher's film The Governess. That year, she co-starred opposite Christian Slater and Morgan Freeman in the action thriller Hard Rain. Driver has also worked on several animated features, voicing Jane in Disney's 1999 version of Tarzan and Lady Eboshi in the 1999 English-dubbed release of the Japanese film Princess Mononoke. In 2000, she starred in Return to Me. In 2003 and 2004, she had a recurring role on Will & Grace as Lorraine Finster, the nemesis of Karen Walker (Megan Mullally) and daughter of Karen's lover, Lyle Finster (John Cleese).

In March 2007, Driver made her return to television in the FX Network show The Riches. She was nominated for an Emmy Award and a Golden Globe Award as Best Lead Actress in a Drama Series in 2007 and 2008, respectively. She was scheduled to appear in The Simpsons Movie, although her appearance was cut from the final version. Driver appeared in the January 2010 episode of Modern Family entitled "Moon Landing". She also starred in the television series The Deep and appeared in Conviction, in the comedy drama Barney's Version, winning a Genie Award for Best Supporting Actress.

In October 2013, Driver started filming for The Crash which was released on 13 January 2017.

Driver landed the lead role in the ABC sitcom Speechless, playing the mother of three children, one of whom has cerebral palsy and uses a wheelchair. The series debuted in the 2016–17 TV season. It was cancelled in May 2019 after three seasons.

In 2026, Driver appeared in the 6-part Canadian drama series The Murder Line, as May Ferguson.

=== Music ===
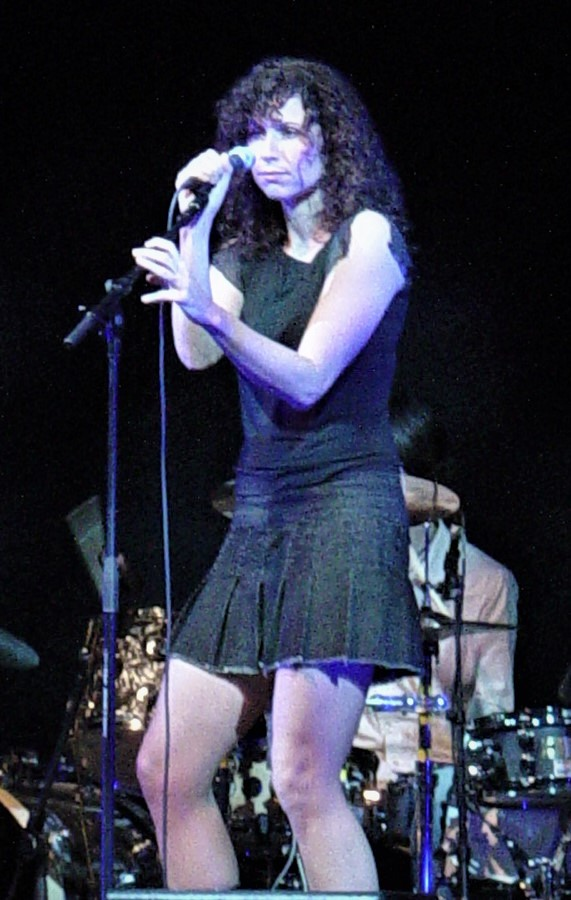
Driver performing in 2004

Driver began making music at boarding school. She collaborated on Bomb the Bass's album Clear, in 1994, as part of the outfit River. She was part of the Milo Roth Band, which received a recording contract when she was 19. In 2001, she signed with EMI and Rounder Records and performed at the SXSW music festival. The title song of Everything I've Got in My Pocket, her first album, reached No. 34 in the U.K., and the song "Invisible Girl" peaked at No. 68. Driver wrote 10 of the 11 songs on the album. In 2004, Driver was the supporting act for the Finn Brothers on the U.K. portion of their world tour.

In 2004, Driver played Carlotta Giudicelli in Joel Schumacher's film The Phantom of the Opera, based on the musical of the same name by Andrew Lloyd Webber. Driver sang "Learn to be Lonely", an original song written for the film by Lloyd Webber. However, because of her lack of opera experience, all her songs as Carlotta were dubbed by opera singer Margaret Preece. Driver released her second album, Seastories, in July 2007, featuring guest appearances by Ryan Adams, the Cardinals and Liz Phair. Driver released a third album in October 2014 called Ask Me to Dance that includes songs by Elliott Smith, Neil Young and The Killers.

=== Podcast ===
In 2021, Driver started a podcast, Minnie Questions with Minnie Driver, in which she asks guests a series of seven questions, inspired by the Proust Questionnaire. Guests have included Chelsea Clinton, Nick Jonas and Cindy Crawford.

== Personal life ==
In 1997, Driver began dating Matt Damon while filming Good Will Hunting. The two split in early 1998. She was briefly engaged to Josh Brolin in 2001. She has a son born in 2008 from a brief relationship with television writer and producer Timothy J. Lea. Driver confirmed that she was in a relationship with Addison O'Dea in 2019.

In 2016, Driver revealed that she was sexually assaulted at age 17 while on holiday in Greece.

On 21 December 2017, Driver became a citizen of the United States. After living in California for 27 years, Driver moved back to London in 2024.

== Activism ==
Driver was a long-time ambassador for and supporter of Oxfam until withdrawing her support in 2018 over a sexual abuse scandal in the organisation.

== Filmography ==
=== Film ===
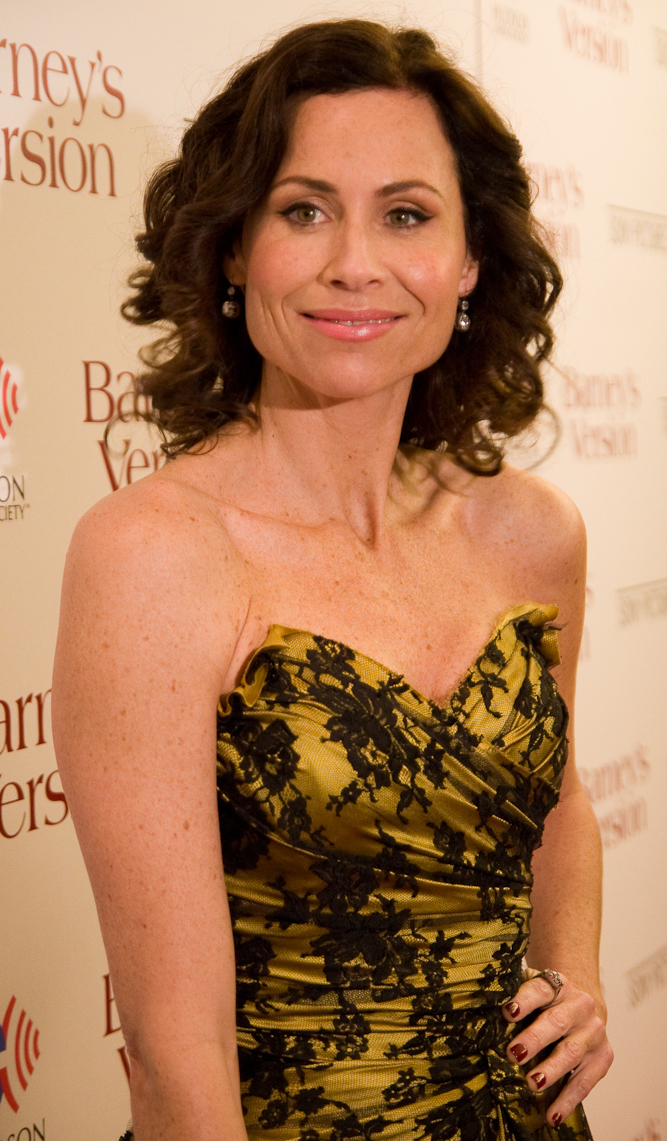
Driver at the red carpet New York premiere of Barney's Version in January 2011

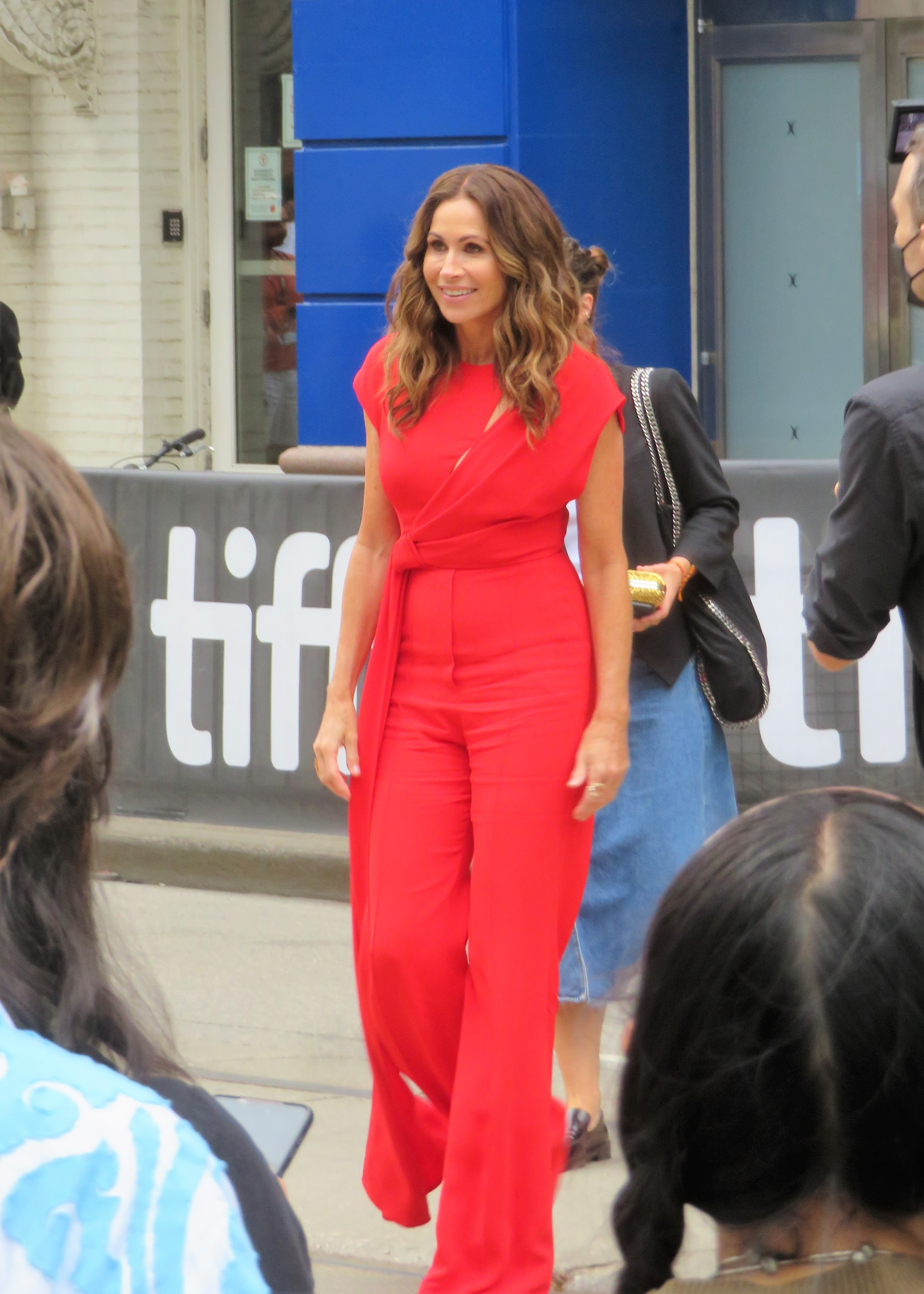
Driver at the premiere of Chevalier in September 2022

Year	Title	Role	Notes	Ref.
1992	The Zebra Man	Emily Ashdown	Short	
1995	Circle of Friends	Bernadette 'Benny' Hogan		
1995	GoldenEye	Irina		
1996	Big Night	Phyllis		
1996	Sleepers	Carol Martinez		
1997	Grosse Pointe Blank	Debi Newberry		
1997	Good Will Hunting	Skylar Satenstein		
1998	Hard Rain	Karen		
1998	The Governess	Rosina da Silva		
1998	At Sachem Farm	Kendal	Also executive producer	
1999	An Ideal Husband	Miss Mabel Chiltern		
1999	Princess Mononoke	Lady Eboshi	Voice, English dub	
1999	Tarzan	Jane Porter	Voice	
1999	South Park: Bigger, Longer & Uncut	Brooke Shields	Voice Cameo	
2000	Return to Me	Grace Briggs		
2000	Beautiful	Mona Hibbard		
2000	Slow Burn	Trina McTeague		
2000	The Upgrade	Constance Levine	Short	
2001	High Heels and Low Lifes	Shannon		
2001	D.C. Smalls	Waitress	Short	
2003	Owning Mahowny	Belinda		
2003	Hope Springs	Vera Edwards		
2004	Ella Enchanted	Mandy		
2004	Portrait	Donna	Short	
2004	The Phantom of the Opera	Carlotta		
2006	The Virgin of Juarez	Karina Danes		
2007	Take	Ana Nichols		
2007	Ripple Effect	Kitty	Also executive producer	
2007	The Simpsons Movie	Grievance Counselor	Deleted scene	
2009	Motherhood	Sheila		
2010	Barney's Version	The 2nd Mrs. P.		
2010	Conviction	Abra Rice		
2011	Hunky Dory	Vivienne Mae		
2012	Goats	Shaman	Uncredited	
2013	I Give It a Year	Naomi		
2014	Return to Zero	Maggie Royal		
2014	Stage Fright	Kylie Swanson		
2014	Beyond the Lights	Macy Jean		
2015	Unity	Narrator	Voice. Documentary	
2017	The Crash	Shannon Clifton	Also known as Conspiracy	
2017	The Wilde Wedding	Priscilla Jones		
2017	Laboratory Conditions	Marjorie Cane	Short	
2018	Spinning Man	Ellen Birch		
2020	Reversal of Fortune	Narrator	Short	
2021	Cinderella	Queen Beatrice		
2022	Chevalier	Marie-Madeleine Guimard		
2022	Rosaline	The Nurse		
2023	Nandor Fodor and the Talking Mongoose	Anne		
2023	Uproar	Shirley Waaka		
2024	The Beekeeper	Director Janet Harward		
2024	Millers in Marriage	Renee		
2024	The Assessment	Evie		
2026	Finding Emily	Dean Watkinson		

=== Television ===
Year	Title	Role	Notes	Ref.
1990	God on the Rocks	Lydia	Television film	
1991	The House of Eliott	Mary	Episode #1.4	
1991	Casualty	Zena Mitchell	Episode: "The Last Word"	
1992	Lovejoy	Sarah	Episode: "Kids"	
1992	Kinsey	Louise Kinsey	3 episodes (series 2)	
1993	Maigret	Arlette	Episode: "Maigret and the Night Club Dancer"	
1993	Mr. Wroe's Virgins	Leah	Miniseries; 4 episodes	
1993	Screen One	Sally	Episode: "Royal Celebration"	
1994	Peak Practice	Sue Keel	Episode: "Enemy Within"	
1994	Knowing Me, Knowing You with Alan Partridge	Daniella Forrest	Episode: "Show 2"	
1994	That Sunday	Rachel	Television short	
1994	The Day Today	Mila Milandrovicz / Lally Sampson	2 episodes	
1995	My Good Friend	Ellie	7 episodes	
1995	The Politician's Wife	Jennifer Caird	Miniseries; 3 episodes	
1996	Murder Most Horrid	Sergeant Cole	Episode: "Confess"	
1996	Cruel Train	Flora Mussell	Television film	
2000	The X-Files	Cinema Audience	Uncredited; episode: "Hollywood A.D."	
2003	Absolutely Fabulous	Herself	Episode: "Panickin'"	
2003–2020	Will & Grace	Lorraine Finster	Recurring role; 9 episodes	
2007	Revisioned: Tomb Raider	Lara Croft	Voice. Lead role; 9 episodes	
2007–2008	The Riches	Dahlia Malloy	Lead role; 20 episodes (seasons 1 & 2)	
2010	Modern Family	Valerie	Episode: "Moon Landing"	
2010	The Deep	Frances Kelly	Lead role; miniseries; 5 episodes	
2011	Hail Mary	Mary Beth Baker	Television film	
2012	Web Therapy	Allegra Favreau	5 episodes	
2012	QuickBites	Ellen	Episode: "Food for Thought"	
2012	Lady Friends	Jennifer Rensen	Television film	
2013	Hollywood Game Night	Herself	Episode: "The Office Party"	
2014	Peter Pan Live!	Adult Wendy Darling / Narrator	Television film	
2014	The Red Tent	Leah	Lead role; miniseries; 2 episodes	
2014	Hell's Kitchen	Herself	Episode: "7 Chefs Again"	
2014–2015	About a Boy	Fiona Bowa	Lead role; 33 episodes (seasons 1 & 2)	
2015	Undateable	Minnie, Ally's Friend	Episode: "A Live Show Walks into a Bar: Part 1"	
2016–2019	Speechless	Maya DiMeo	Lead role; 63 episodes (seasons 1–3)	
2018–2019	SuperMansion	Debby Devizo	Voice; 5 episodes	
2021	Modern Love	Stephanie Curran	Episode: "On a Serpentine Road, with the Top Down"	
2021–2023	Starstruck	Cath	Recurring role; 4 episodes	
2022	The Witcher: Blood Origin	Seanchai	Lead role; miniseries; 4 episodes	
2023	Our Flag Means Death	Anne Bonny	Episode: "Fun and Games"	
2024	Batman: Caped Crusader	Oswalda Cobblepot / The Penguin	Voice; episode: "In Treacherous Waters"	
2024	The Serpent Queen	Queen Elizabeth I	5 episodes (season 2)	
2024	Krapopolis	Shlub's Mother	Voice; episode: "National Lampoon's The Odyssey!"	
2024	Arcane	Illusionary Sorceress	Voice; 3 episodes (season 2)	
2025	Emily in Paris	Princess Jane	Recurring role; 5 episodes (season 5)	
2026	The Borderline	May Ferguson	Lead role; miniseries; 6 episodes	
2026	Run Away	Ingrid Greene	Lead role; miniseries; 8 episodes	
2026	The Faithful: Women of the Bible	Sarai / Sarah	Lead role; miniseries; 2 episodes	
2026	The Day	Vox	Lead role	Post-production

== Awards and nominations ==
Year	Award	Category	Nominated work	Result	Ref.
1995	Chicago Film Critics Association Award	Most Promising Actress	Circle of Friends	Won	
1996	London Film Critics' Circle Award	British Supporting Actress of the Year	Big Night	Nominated	
1996	London Film Critics' Circle Award	British Supporting Actress of the Year	Sleepers	Nominated	
1997	Academy Award	Best Supporting Actress	Good Will Hunting	Nominated	
1997	London Film Critics' Circle Award	British Supporting Actress of the Year	Good Will Hunting	Won	
1997	Satellite Award	Best Supporting Actress – Motion Picture	Good Will Hunting	Nominated	
1997	Screen Actors Guild Award	Outstanding Performance by a Female Actor in a Supporting Role	Good Will Hunting	Nominated	
1997	Screen Actors Guild Award	Outstanding Performance by a Cast in a Motion Picture	Good Will Hunting	Nominated	
1998	MTV Movie Award	Best Kiss (shared with Matt Damon)	Good Will Hunting	Nominated	
1999	Annie Award	Voice Acting in a Feature Production	Tarzan	Nominated	
2004	Satellite Award	Best Supporting Actress – Motion Picture	The Phantom of the Opera	Nominated	
2004	London Film Critics' Circle Award	British Supporting Actress of the Year	The Phantom of the Opera	Nominated	
2007	Golden Globe Award	Best Actress – Television Series Drama	The Riches	Nominated	
2007	Primetime Emmy Award	Outstanding Lead Actress – Drama Series	The Riches	Nominated	
2007	Satellite Award	Best Actress – Television Series Drama	The Riches	Nominated	
2007	California Independent Film Festival Award	Best Actress	Take	Won	
2007	Phoenix Film Festival	Best Acting Ensemble	Take	Won	
2007	Tiburon International Film Festival Award	Best Actress	Take	Won	
2010	Genie Award	Best Performance by an Actress in a Supporting Role	Barney's Version	Won	
2010	London Film Critics' Circle Award	British Supporting Actress of the Year	Barney's Version	Nominated	
2010	Vancouver Film Critics Circle Award	Best Supporting Actress in a Canadian Film	Barney's Version	Nominated	
2015	Critics' Choice Television Award	Best Actress in a Movie/Miniseries	Return to Zero	Nominated	
2015	Primetime Emmy Award	Outstanding Lead Actress in a Miniseries or a Movie	Return to Zero	Nominated	
2017	People's Choice Awards	Favorite Actress in a New TV Series	Speechless	Nominated	
2018	FilmQuest	Best Supporting Actress	Laboratory Conditions	Won	
2018	FilmQuest	Best Supporting Actress – Short	Laboratory Conditions	Won	

== Other media ==
=== Video games ===
Year	Title	Voice role	Notes	Ref.
1998	Trespasser	Anne		
2002	Quest for the Code	Smokita		

=== Web ===
Year	Title	Role	Notes	Ref.
2007	Revisioned: Tomb Raider	Lara Croft	Voice, 10 episodes	

== Discography ==
=== Albums ===
Year	Album	US Heat	Label	Ref.
2004	Everything I've Got in My Pocket	43	Zoë	
2007	Seastories	25	Zoë	
2014	Ask Me to Dance	11	Rounder	

=== Singles ===
Year	Single	Album	Ref.
2004	"Invisible Girl"	Everything I've Got in My Pocket	
2005	"Everything I've Got in My Pocket"	Everything I've Got in My Pocket	

== Works ==
- Managing Expectations: A Memoir. London: Manilla Press. 2022. ISBN 9781786582409. OCLC 1300420971.
