= Limelight (Marti Webb album) =

Studio album by Marti Webb
- Released: 2003
- Studio: JazzMouse Studios
- Producer: Marti Webb, Gary Branch

Marti Webb chronology
Marti Webb Sings Gershwin: The Love Songs (1998)	Limelight (2003)

Limelight is a 2003 studio album by Marti Webb. The album was self-financed and co-produced by Webb with Gary Branch. It mainly features musicians that had been involved with The Magic of the Musicals tours throughout the 1990s and includes new recordings of Webb's most popular songs from previous albums.

== Production ==
It was recorded at the JazzMouse Studios in East Berkshire.

"Shall We Dance" is a duet with Ronobir Lahiri, who was playing The King of Siam in a UK tour of The King and I opposite Webb, who played as Anna Leonowens, at the time of this album's recording. "Elaborate Lives" features harmony vocals by Robert Meadmore, who had appeared in one of The Magic of the Musicals tours with Webb.

Webb first performed the song "As Long As He Needs Me" as Nancy in Oliver! and "Stage Door John" when playing Susie Dean in the musical version of J. B. Priestley's The Good Companions. She had not previously recorded "As Long As He Needs Me".

Webb had previously recorded "Wind Beneath My Wings" and "Ben" for album Encore (1985), "Take That Look Off Your Face" for album Tell Me on a Sunday (1980) and "Always There" for her album Always There (1986).

== Release, marketing and promotion ==
The album was only made available through the London musical theatre merchandise shop Dress Circle and at the venues on Webb's tours.

== Track listing ==
1. "Hello, Young Lovers" (Richard Rodgers, Oscar Hammerstein II) - from the musical The King and I
2. "Limelight" (Eric Woolfson, Alan Parsons)
3. "As Long As He Needs Me" (Lionel Bart) - from the musical Oliver!
4. "Wind Beneath My Wings" (Larry Henley, Jeff Silbar)
5. "Ben" (Walter Scharf, Don Black)
6. "Take That Look Off Your Face" (Andrew Lloyd Webber, Don Black) - from the musical Tell Me on a Sunday
7. "Always There" (Simon May, Leslie Osbourne, Don Black) - Theme from Howard's Way
8. "Stage Door John" André Previn, Johnny Mercer) - from the musical The Good Companions
9. "With One Look" (Andrew Lloyd Webber, Don Black, Christopher Hampton with contributions by Amy Powers) - from the musical Sunset Boulevard
10. "Hush-A-Bye Mountain" (Robert B. Sherman, Richard M. Sherman) - from the musical Chitty Chitty Bang Bang
11. "Elaborate Lives" (Elton John, Tim Rice) - Duet with Robert Meadmore - from the musical Aida
12. "Shall We Dance" (Richard Rodgers, Oscar Hammerstein II) - Duet with Ronobir Lahiri - from the musical The King and I

== Personnel ==
=== Musicians ===
- Marti Webb - lead and backing vocals
- Robert Meadmore - guest vocals
- Ronobir Lahiri - guest vocals
- Andy Read - piano, musical direction
- Pete Kelly - keyboards
- Gary Branch - woodwind, saxophones
- Colin Hill - trombone, euphonium, bass trombone
- Gavin Mallett - trumpet, flugelhorn
- Justin Myers - bass guitar
- Barry Cook - drums
- James Turner - percussion
- Pete Callard - guitars

=== Production credits ===
- Producers - Marti Webb and Gary Branch
- Vocal recording and mixing - Paul Fawcus
