= Performance (Marti Webb album) =

Studio album by Marti Webb
- Released: 31 December 1989
- Studios: Angel Recording Studios, Islington
- Genre: Musical theatre
- Length: 51:59
- Label: First Night Records/Telstar/WEA
- Producer: Chris Walker

Marti Webb chronology
Marti Webb Sings Small Screen Themes (1988)	Performance (1989)	The Magic of the Musicals (Marti Webb & Mark Rattray) (1992)

Performance is a 1989 studio album by Marti Webb (born 13 December 1944, Hampstead, North West London) with the Philharmonia Orchestra. Although originally released in 1989 on LP it has subsequently been released in 1993, 1994 and 1996 on CD.

The album was produced by Chris Walker for First Night Records and released by Telstar Records in the UK and by WEA records in Eire.

The album features songs from musical theatre. A number of tracks were from then new shows, and various others from productions that had recently been playing the West End. Webb's recording of "Memory" coincided with her return to play Grizabella in Cats, for the UK's first tour of the show.

"In One of My Weaker Moments" was released by Telstar as a single, with "Tell Me on a Sunday" as the B side. The song featured in a then new musical, Budgie, for which the lyrics were written by Webb's manager and collaborator Don Black. Anita Dobson, who starred in the stage version of the show, also released a single of the track around a similar time.

Black was also the lyricist for the musical Aspects of Love, which also opened in London in 1989, from which "Anything But Lonely" and "Love Changes Everything" are taken.

== Track listing ==
1. "Intro"
2. "I Dreamed a Dream" from Les Miserables (Alain Boublil, Herbert Kretzmer, Jean-Marc Natel, Claude-Michel Schönberg)
3. "Almost Like Being in Love" from Brigadoon (Alan Jay Lerner, Frederick Loewe)
4. "The Music of the Night" from The Phantom of the Opera (Charles Hart, Richard Stilgoe, Andrew Lloyd Webber)
5. "Losing My Mind" from Follies (Stephen Sondheim)
6. "Anything But Lonely" from Aspects of Love (Don Black, Charles Hart, Andrew Lloyd Webber)
7. "Only He" from Starlight Express (Richard Stilgoe, Andrew Lloyd Webber)
8. "Memory" from Cats (Trevor Nunn after T. S. Eliot, Andrew Lloyd Webber)
9. "Love Changes Everything" from Aspects of Love (Don Black, Charles Hart, Andrew Lloyd Webber)
10. "Once You Lose Your Heart" from Me and My Girl (Noel Gay)
11. "The Last Man in My Life" from Song and Dance (Don Black, Andrew Lloyd Webber)
12. "I Am What I Am" from La Cage aux Folles (Jerry Herman)
13. "In One of My Weaker Moments" from Budgie (Don Black, Mort Shuman)
14. "Tell Me on a Sunday" from Tell Me on a Sunday and subsequently Song and Dance (Don Black, Andrew Lloyd Webber)
15. "Blow, Gabriel, Blow" from Anything Goes (Cole Porter)

== Personnel ==
=== Musicians ===
- Andy Lynwood – keyboards
- Ian Hughes – keyboards
- Andy Pask – bass guitar
- Mitch Dalton – guitars, banjo
- Graham Ward – drums
- Dave Hancock – trumpet (solo: "Blow, Gabriel, Blow")
- John Franchi – clarinet (solo: "Blow, Gabriel, Blow")
- John Lusher – trombone (solo: "Blow, Gabriel, Blow")
- Keith Bragg – piccolo (solo: "Blow, Gabriel, Blow")
- John Jenkins – tuba (solo: "Blow, Gabriel, Blow")
- Kevin Fitzsimmons – piano (solo: "Tell Me on a Sunday", "Losing My Mind")
- George Ives – cello (solo: "Tell Me on a Sunday")
- Jamie Talbot – alto saxophone (solo: "I Am What I Am")
- Tim Payne – alto saxophone (solo: "Losing My Mind")
- Bradley Creswick – violin (solo: "Losing My Mind")
- John Barclay – trumpet
- Alan Downie – trumpet

=== Production credits ===
- Produced by Chris Walker
- Conceived and co-ordinated for First Night Records by John Craig
- Arranged and conducted by Ian Hughes
- Recorded at Angel Recording Studios, Islington, London
- Recording Engineer: Dave Hunt
- Thanks to David Whelton and The Philharmonia Orchestra (Leader: Bradley Creswick)
- Music copying by Ann Barnard Associates and Topscore Music Services
- Specialist musicians contracted by Quentin Williams on behalf of The Philharmonia Orchestra
- Management: Don Black Enterprises
- Hair: Richard at Michaeljohn
- Make-up: Mark Easton
- Thanks to Tom
- Design: The Indigo Design Company
- Photography: Peter Dazeley
