= Mitch Sebastian =

British theatre director and choreographer

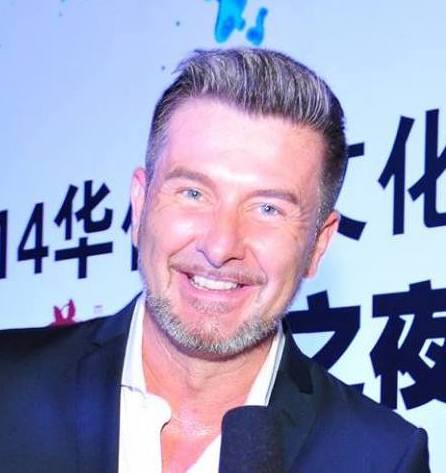
- Sebastian at MSEB 2016
- Born: 1966 (age 59–60)
- Occupations: theatre director, choreographer, and performer

Mitch Sebastian (born 1966) is a British theatre director, choreographer and performer. He has been nominated for an Olivier Award and Whatsonstage Award for writing, directing and choreographing The Rat Pack: Live from Las Vegas. He was Artistic Director of Kilworth House Theatre 2005-2015. He won a BAFTA Award as part of the creative team behind the children's animated TV series, Yoko! Jakamoto! Toto!.

== Early life and education ==
The son of Patrick and Nancy Walsh and the second oldest of four children, Sebastian grew up in Rochdale, Lancashire and showed a precocious talent as a dancer, performing in community theatre as a young child.

== Career ==
=== Performer ===
As a performer he appeared in the European Premieres of Stephen Sondheim's, Follies and Pacific Overtures . He was a featured dancer appearing by invitation at Her Majesty's Royal Variety Performance in 1984 and 1991. Played the Maitre D and various other roles in Dame Gillian Lynne's production of Cabaret (1986) starring Toyah Willcox; the role of Bobo and Electra in Starlight Express (1987-1989); played Munkustrap, Skimbleshanks and other roles in Cats (1989 - 1991); Original cast of Stephen Schwartz's, Children of Eden (1991) where he was assistant to choreographer, Sir Matthew Bourne; Montparnasse, Bishop of Digne and other roles in Les Misérables (1992) where he was also the show's Dance Captain for Cameron Mackintosh Ltd. He was then Dance Captain on the Broadway production of The Who's Tommy (1993) for Des McAnuff and Wayne Cilento where he played Pinball Lad 1 and various other roles.

His other performing credits include starring in The Magic of the Musicals with Marti Webb (UK, European and US Tours) Various TV specials, Award shows, concert tours and Pop videos backing the following artists: Diana Ross, Elton John, Tina Turner, Duran Duran, Pet Shop Boys, Culture Club, Kim Wilde, Elkie Brookes, Kate Bush, Kiki Dee, Marti Webb, Ben E. King and Meatloaf

=== Choreographer ===
Noted for musical staging and choreography on the following new musicals: Sing To The Dawn – Kallang Theatre, Singapore, Made in Sheffield – Crucible Theatre, Sheffield, London; Hogarth – Bridewell Theatre, London; Lucky Stiff starring Tracie Bennet, Paul Baker and Frances Ruffelle at the Bridewell Theatre, London; Eyam – Bridewell Theatre, London; X at the Crucible Theatre, Sheffield and A Twist of Fate – Jubilee Theatre, Singapore, Dick Barton series, Croydon Warehouse Theatre, Nottingham Playhouse, Swan Theatre, Royal Shakespeare Company.

Sebastian was stage director for a series of concerts for London Philharmonic Orchestra under the baton of Kurt Masur and Movement Director for the Peter Hall Company for a season at the Old Vic Theatre, London. He choreographed Iolanthe for the D'Oyly Carte Opera Company and staged the West End production of Romance Romance starring Caroline O'Connor at the Gielgud Theatre. Sebastian also provided musical staging and choreography for the new musical La Cava playing both the Victoria Palace Theatre and Piccadilly Theatre in London's West End.

He choreographed and devised ONE the largest ever concert production in Israel (2006) with over 50 dancers and acrobats the show celebrated, international singing star, Rita.

He collaborated on the children's animated series, Yoko! Jakamoko! Toto! devising choreographed sequences for Collingwood O'Hare. Winning the 2004 BAFTA Award for Pre-School Animation.

Commercial work as a choreographer on TV specials, Award Shows and pop videos for the following artists: Destiny’s Child, Shaggy, Ricky Martin, Robbie Williams, Emma Bunton and Bjork.

=== Director/Choreographer ===
He began by devising and directing the hugely successful concert tours of The Magic of the Musicals- London Palladium / UK & European Tours (1994 - 1998) and Hollywood and Broadway - London Palladium / UK Tours (1995 - 1998) Directed and choreographed a large scale arena production of Chicago for the Baalbeck International Festival. Starring Caroline O'Connor, Nicola Hughes, Tim Flavin, Paul Baker and Gavin Lee. It was the first Western musical to be performed in Lebanon. The production was then presented in Kuala Lumpur, Malaysia and Larnaca, Cyprus.

In 2004 Sebastian directed and choreographed the Laurence Olivier Award ceremony. The same year he was also nominated for creating, The Rat Pack: Live from Las Vegas which ran for over four years in London's West End. Sebastian directed the USA national Tour, Canadian production, UK National tour and European National Tour all of which ran for many years. He directed the film for PBS in America with additional footage shot at the Savoy Hotel where Sinatra often stayed in London. He subsequently created the sequel, Christmas with the Rat Pack (2003) which continues to be produced around the world.

In 2007 Sebastian opened Kilworth House Theatre and remained as Artistic Director until 2015 directing twelve Landmark musicals. Establishing the Theatre's reputation with sold out seasons.

He collaborated with Stephen Schwartz on a radical re-staging of Pippin placing the action in the World of Video games it opened at the Menier Chocolate Factory in 2011. A new alternative ending was crafted by Sebastian in an earlier production in 1998 and was later included in the 2013 Broadway revival.

La Novicia Rebelde (The Sound of Music) was premiered in Bogota, Colombia in 2015 in a new production directed by Mitch Sebastian. This was the first professional production of a Rodgers and Hammerstein musical in that country and broke all box office records.

=== Writer/Director ===
The Rat Pack: Live from Las Vegas – West End, US Tour, European Tour, UK Tour, Canada.

Cheer! – USA workshop collaborating with Paula Abdul on a new Broadway show for Richard Frankel productions, NYC.

Savior IV - Collaborating with Japanese artist and designer, Hiromi Omote Japanese Embassy, London

The West End Men - Created, devised and directed the original show. UK Tour and Vaudeville Theatre, West End

Por Siempre Navidad - Co-book writer and director of this new Christmas musical for MISI Producciones in Bogota, Colombia

The Opera Show - Conceived and created by Sebastian early productions at Kilworth House Theatre spawned a World Tour; opening in the USA closing at the Teatro Arcimboldi, Milan, Italy.

Evolution- An original piece of immersive theatre with a score by Curtis Moore. Created by Sebastian this large scale multi-media, promenade production opened in a purpose built space in Shenzhen, China. Later moving to Guangzhou in 2016 for a limited season.

Peter Pan - Book writer and director/choreographer. This new musical written in Spanish with music by Maria Isobel Murillo Samper for MISI Producciones opened in Bogota, Colombia in 2016.
