= The Magic of the Musicals =

The Magic of the Musicals was a UK concert series, produced by Flying Music, that regularly toured the UK in the 1990s and 2000s, initially starring Marti Webb and Mark Rattray with Mitch Sebastian, Paul Robinson, Lucie Florentine and Dawn Spence.

It was recorded for album release and television broadcast at the Bristol Hippodrome on 21 June 1992. The album, on CD and cassette, and VHS video was released on 28 September 1992.

The show first toured in spring 1991, but its popularity led to a further tour in early 1992 and another in the autumn of that year. It was subsequently repeated with different performers and songs, a number of times. Notably a 30 date tour of Canada and North America playing to sold out Arenas. The cast featured Marti Webb, Mark Rattray, Mitch Sebastian, Ian Mackenzie-Stewart, Alison Pollard and Linda Mae Brewer.

Mitch Sebastian was the director / choreographer from 1994 - 1998 creating new formats each season to reflect the current hit shows. Webb performed regularly on all UK and European Tours alongside Robert Meadmore, Wayne Sleep and Dave Willetts. Melanie Stace and Kerry Ellis also replaced Webb for various tours.

By 1991, Webb was established as one of the principal musical theatre performers in the UK. Rattray had won the 1990 series of the television talent show Opportunity Knocks with his performance of "Empty Chairs at Empty Tables" from the musical Les Miserables.

== Album ==
=== Track listing ===
#	Title	Original Show	Performer
1	"Lullaby of Broadway"	Gold Diggers of 1935	
1	"I Got Rhythm"	Girl Crazy	
2	"I Get a Kick Out of You"	Anything Goes	Mark Rattray
3	"It Ain't Necessarily So"	Porgy and Bess	
3	"I Got Plenty of Nothing"	Porgy and Bess	
3	"There's a Boat That's Leaving Soon for New York"	Porgy and Bess	Mark Rattray
3	"Porgy, I's Your Woman Now"	Porgy and Bess	Marti Webb
4	"Summertime"	Porgy and Bess	Mark Rattray
5	"Blow, Gabriel, Blow"	Anything Goes	Marti Webb
6	"Losing My Mind"	Follies	Marti Webb
7	"Not While I'm Around"	Sweeney Todd	Mark Rattray
8	"Send in the Clowns"	A Little Night Music	Marti Webb
9	"Do You Hear the People Sing?"	Les Miserables	
10	"Empty Chairs at Empty Tables"	Les Miserables	Mark Rattray
11	"I Dreamed a Dream"	Les Miserables	Marti Webb
12	"Do You Hear the People Sing?" (reprise)	Les Miserables	
13	"The Last Night of the World"	Miss Saigon	Marti Webb and Mark Rattray
14	"Bui-Doi"	Miss Saigon	Mark Rattray
15	"Don't Cry for Me Argentina"	Evita	Marti Webb
16	"Superstar"	Jesus Christ Superstar	Mark Rattray
17	"Mama, A Rainbow"	Minnie's Boys	Mark Rattray
18	"Take That Look Off Your Face"	Song & Dance	Marti Webb
19	"In One of My Weaker Moments"	Budgie	Marti Webb
20	"Anthem"	Chess	Mark Rattray
21	"You and I"	Chess	Marti Webb and Mark Rattray
22	"Tell Me It's Not True"	Blood Brothers	Marti Webb
23	"Only He"	Starlight Express	Marti Webb
24	"Love Changes Everything"	Aspects of Love	Mark Rattray
25	"The Music of the Night"	The Phantom of the Opera	Mark Rattray
26	"Memory"	Cats	Marti Webb

=== Personnel ===
- Producer - Pip Williams for Handle Artists
- Associate Producer - Tom Button
- Executive Producers - Paul Walden and Derek Nicol for The Flying Record Company
- Live Recording Engineer - John Wilson
- Post Production Engineer - Paul Golding
- Assistant Engineers - Mark Tucker and James Collins
- Original Stage Directors - Hugh Wooldridge and Richard Sampson
- Choreographer - Richard Sampson
- Replacement Director/Choreographer - Mitch Sebastian
- Marti Webb's Manager - Don Black
- Mark Rattray's Managers - Lindsey Brown and David Walker for Handle Artists
- Album Coordination - Paul Walden and Lindsey Downs
- Album Concept - Paul Walden and Derek Nicol
- Logo Design - Dewynters
- Liner Notes - John Martland

=== Musicians ===
- Musical Director / Keyboards / Backing Vocals - Jae Alexander
- Keyboards - Dominic Barlow
- Electric and Acoustic Guitars - Graeme Taylor
- Bass Guitar - Steve Richardson
- Percussion - Keith Fairburn
- Trumpets / Flugels - Avelia Moisey and Lance Kelly
- Alto Sax / Flute / Clarinet - Nick Moss
- Tenor Sax / Clarinet / Bass Clarinet - Jenny Tilley
- Oboe / Cor Anglais - Deborah Boyes
- Trombone / Bass trombone - Steve Wilkes
- Drums - Sebastian Guard
