= Tell Me on a Sunday (album) =

Tell me on a Sunday

Studio album by Marti Webb
- Released: February 1980
- Recorded: 1979
- Studio: Morgan Studios, London, England
- Genre: Pop; MOR
- Label: Polydor
- Producer: Andrew Lloyd Webber

Marti Webb chronology
Tell me on a Sunday (1980)	Won't Change Places (1981)

Tell Me on a Sunday is the debut solo album by English actress and singer Marti Webb. It was released in 1980 and includes songs from the musical of the same name, in which Webb starred.

All tracks were written by Andrew Lloyd Webber and Don Black and tell the story of an English girl who has emigrated to the United States and embarks on a succession of romances. The music later formed the first half of the stage show Song and Dance, in which Webb also starred.

== Background ==
As well as composing the music, Lloyd Webber also arranged and produced the album. Released in 1980 and having been recorded in the latter part of 1979, it was one of Lloyd Webber's first pieces of work to be published by his own Really Useful Company, which he had formed three years earlier.

The musicians were mainly those that had been involved with Lloyd Webber's 1978 Variations album. American musical theatre actress Elaine Stritch performed a cameo role as an answering service attendee on the track "Capped Teeth and Caesar Salad".

The first single to be released from the album, "Take That Look Off Your Face" reached No. 3 in the UK singles chart in February 1980, while the title track reached No. 67 some months later. The album itself was one of the biggest selling albums of the year in the UK, reaching No. 2 in the UK Albums Chart and spending 23 weeks on that chart—eight of them in the top 10. The album was first issued on compact disc in 1987 and re-issued in 1993.

The songs on the album were re-recorded live in 1982 and released as the double album cast recording of Song and Dance with some additional material.

== Track listing ==
All tracks written by Andrew Lloyd Webber (music) and Don Black (lyrics).

Side one

No.	Title	Length
1.	"Take That Look Off Your Face"	3:02
2.	"Let Me Finish"	2:18
3.	"It's Not the End of the World (If I Lose Him)"	1:38
4.	"Letter Home to England"	1:12
5.	"Sheldon Bloom"	3:28
6.	"Capped Teeth and Caesar Salad"	2:52
7.	"You Made Me Think You Were in Love"	2:23
8.	"It's Not the End of the World (If He's Younger)"	2:12
9.	"Second Letter Home"	1:15

Side two

No.	Title	Length
1.	"Come Back with the Same Look in Your Eyes"	3:24
2.	"Let's Talk About You"	2:12
3.	"Take That Look Off Your Face (Reprise)"	0:51
4.	"Tell Me on a Sunday"	3:29
5.	"It's Not the End of the World (If He's Married)"	2:14
6.	"I'm Very You, You're Very Me"	2:56
7.	"Nothing Like You've Ever Known"	3:06
8.	"Let Me Finish (Reprise)"	2:36

== Personnel ==
Musicians

- Marti Webb – lead and backing vocals
- Rod Argent – keyboards
- Jon Hiseman – drums
- Ricky Hitchcock, Paul Keogh – guitar
- Paul Jones – harmonica
- Julian Lloyd Webber – cello
- John Mole – bass
- Morris Pert – percussion
- Barbara Thompson – flute, saxophone
- London Philharmonic Orchestra – orchestra on "Tell Me on a Sunday" and "It's Not the End of the World (If He's Married)"; conducted by Harry Rabinowitz

Production

- David Caddick, Paul Maguire – conductors
- David Hamilton Smith, Martyn Webster, Nigel Green, Dave Harris – engineers
- Gary Moore – engineer on 1987 digital transfer for album's first release on CD

== Charts ==
=== Weekly charts ===
Chart (1980)	Peak position
German Albums (Offizielle Top 100)	16
Norwegian Albums (VG-lista)	24
UK Albums (OCC)	2

=== Year-end charts ===
Chart (1980)	Position
German Albums (Offizielle Top 100)	60
