= The Good Companions =

1929 novel by J.B. Priestley

- First edition
- Author: J. B. Priestley
- Language: English
- Publisher: William Heinemann Ltd
- Publication date: 1929
- Publication place: United Kingdom
- Media type: Print (hardback)
- Followed by: Angel Pavement
- Text: The Good Companions online

The Good Companions is a novel by the English author J. B. Priestley.

Written in 1929, it follows the fortunes of a concert party on a tour of England. It is the novel that established Priestley as a national figure. It won the James Tait Black Memorial Prize and was adapted twice into film.

== Plot summary ==
The novel is written in picaresque style and opens with the middle-aged, discontented Jess Oakroyd in the fictional Yorkshire town of Bruddersford. He opts to leave his family and seek adventure "on t'road". (Throughout the novel Priestley uses dialect for all non-RP speakers of English.) He heads south down the Great North Road.

Intertwined with the story of Oakroyd's travels are those of Elizabeth Trant and Inigo Jollifant, two similarly malcontented individuals. Miss Trant is an upper-middle-class spinster and Jollifant is a teacher at a down-at-heel private school. All three ultimately encounter one another when a failing concert troupe ('The Dinky Doos') are disbanding as a result of their manager's running off with the takings. The independently wealthy Miss Trant, against the advice of her relatives, decides to refloat the troupe, now known as The Good Companions. Inigo plays piano and writes songs, Oakroyd is the odd-job man and the troupe has also been joined by Mr Morton Mitcham (a travelling banjo player and conjuror whom Inigo met earlier on his own odyssey). The other members of the troupe are comedian Jimmy Nunn, song-and-dance man Jerry Jerningham, singers Elsie Longstaff, Courtney (aka Joe) Brundit and Joe's wife (referred to as Mrs Joe) and singer-comedienne Susie Dean. The troupe have various adventures round the shires of middle England.

After a sabotaged performance the troupe disband: Jerry marries Lady Partlit, a fan; Susie and Inigo become successful and famous in London; Miss Trant marries a long-lost sweetheart; Jess Oakroyd emigrates to Canada and the other performers carry on with their life on the road.

== Literary significance and reception ==
The Good Companions was an instant hit on publication but was not particularly well regarded by critics. Nevertheless it remained popular for more than forty years. It then fell out of favour, not only because the novel was written from a (rather old-fashioned) middle-class perspective, but also because it dealt with a phenomenon (a travelling music hall troupe) that no longer existed.

More recently there has been a reappraisal of this and other Priestley works: a new edition of The Good Companions appeared in October 2007 with a foreword by Dame Judi Dench, accompanying a reappraisal of the various versions by Ronald Harwood, André Previn and Alan Plater amongst others.

In Graham Greene's 1932 novel Stamboul Train, Priestley is satirized as Quin Savory, author of The Great Gay Round.

== Dramatic adaptations ==
=== 1931 theatrical adaptation ===
Priestley collaborated with Edward Knoblock on a stage version of his novel, which opened at His Majesty's Theatre, London, on 14 May 1931. It ran for nine months, with Edward Chapman, Edith Sharpe and John Gielgud in the cast.

=== 1933 film version ===
The first film version appeared hard on the heels of the play. Produced by Gaumont, it starred John Gielgud as Ingo Jollifant, Jessie Matthews as Susie Dean and Edmund Gwenn as Jess Oakroyd.

=== 1957 film version ===
A Technicolor remake was directed by J. Lee Thompson for Associated British Picture Corporation and starred Eric Portman as Oakroyd, Celia Johnson as Miss Trant, Joyce Grenfell as Lady Partlit, Janette Scott as Susie Dean, John Fraser as Inigo Jollifant and Rachel Roberts as Elsie and Effie Longstaff. This version updates the narrative and music to the late 'fifties (with a score by Laurie Johnson) when touring shows were in decline. It did not replicate the success of the book and signified the end of the novel's popular success. It came to be typified by the contemporaneous Angry Young Men of British stage and screen as the kind of unrealistic depiction of working-class Britain they were struggling to be free of.

=== 1974 stage musical ===
On 11 July 1974 a musical adaptation, directed by Braham Murray with a libretto by Ronald Harwood, music by André Previn and lyrics by Johnny Mercer (in his last show) opened at Her Majesty's Theatre in London – the same venue as the stage play more than forty years earlier (having had its world premiere at the Palace Theatre in Manchester). The cast included John Mills as Oakroyd, Judi Dench as Miss Trant and Marti Webb as Susie Dean. It was revived in 2000 at the Eureka Theater in San Francisco. In October 2001 it was performed at the York Theatre in New York City as part of the York's ‘Musicals in Mufti’ reading series.

=== 1980 TV version ===
A Yorkshire Television series appeared in 1980, adapted by Alan Plater. It starred Judy Cornwell as Elizabeth Trant and John Stratton as Jess Oakroyd. (Music composed by David Fanshawe. Executive Producer – David Cunliffe, Producer – Leonard Lewis, Directors – Leonard Lewis and Bill Hays.)

=== 1995 stage musical ===
Peter Cheeseman commissioned Bob Eaton (Book and Lyrics) and Sayan Kent (Book and Music) to write a new stage musical version for the New Vic Theatre, Newcastle Under Lyme. It was directed by Bob Eaton. It has since been performed at the Theatre by the Lake, Keswick, in 2002, directed by Ian Forrest, the New Wolsey Theatre, Ipswich, in 2003 directed by Peter Rowe and in 1998 it was the 40th Anniversary production at the Belgrade Theatre, Coventry, where Bob Eaton was Artistic Director (1996 to 2003).

=== 2009 stage musical ===
The Bristol Old Vic Theatre School produced an all-new musical version at the Bristol Old Vic Studio in November 2009. Directed by the school's Artistic Director, Sue Wilson, it featured a new script and score by Malcolm McKee, design by Sue Mayes and choreography by Gail Gordon.

=== Radio adaptations ===
In 1994 BBC Radio 4 broadcast an adaptation featuring Bernard Cribbins as Jess Oakroyd and Hannah Gordon as Miss Trant.

On 4, 11 and 18 August 2002 BBC Radio 4 broadcast a three-part dramatisation of Priestley's novel by Eric Pringle, with Helen Longworth as Suzie Dean, Philip Jackson as Jess Oakroyd, Jemma Churchill as Elizabeth Trant and Nicholas Boulton as Inigo Jolliphant. The production was directed by Claire Grove and was rebroadcast on BBC Radio 7 from 25 to 27 May 2010.

BBC Radio 4 broadcast a 90-minute adaptation by John Retallack on 24 February 2018, directed by David Hunter and featuring Ralph Ineson as Jess Oakroyd, Fenella Woolgar as Miss Trant, Roy Hudd as Jimmy Nunn, Oliver Gomm as Inigo Jollifant and Isabella Inchbald as Susie Dean.
