= I'm Not That Kind of Girl =

I'm Not that Kind of Girl

Studio album by Marti Webb
- Released: February 1983
- Recorded: 1981–82
- Studio: The Manor Studio, Townhouse Studios, Maison Rouge, and Hipposound
- Genre: Pop, MOR
- Length: 37:35
- Label: Polydor
- Producer: David Hentschel

Marti Webb chronology
Won't Change Places (1981)	I'm Not that Kind of Girl (1983)	Encore (1985)

I'm Not That Kind of Girl is a studio album released in 1983 by British singer Marti Webb. It was a follow-up to 1981's Won't Change Places. The songs on the album are linked by a story and were written by David Hentschel and Don Black.

== Background ==
The album was produced by David Hentschel, who also composed the music. The lyrics were written by Don Black who was at the time, Webb's manager. It was in the song cycle format that had proved successful for Webb's 1980 album Tell Me On a Sunday which Black had co-written with Andrew Lloyd Webber. The story is about a woman meeting up with a former lover and embarking on a new relationship with him, dealing with her insecurities in between, and ending with her about to marry him. Some of the songs are humorous in tone with Janet Reger and Jane Fonda referenced in the titles, although takes a more dramatic theme in the closing two tracks. The album's genre is contemporary pop, somewhat at odds with Webb's usual style, but it does feature a number of power ballads. The album was originally titled One Afternoon.

It was Webb's third and final album for the Polydor label but failed to chart. Singles from the album were "Getting It Right", "I'm Not That Kind of Girl" and "Didn't Mean to Fall in Love".

The album was recorded between November 1981 and June 1982 at The Manor, The Townhouse, Maison Rouge, and Hipposound Studios. The album boasted a strong musical backing, including Kiki Dee and Phil Collins - the latter having worked with Hentschel many times before. Prolific session musicians John Giblin and Phil Palmer also provided musical backing.

== Track listing ==
=== Side One ===
1. "Seven Outside Mr Chows" (4.49)
2. "Didn't Mean to Fall in Love" (4.03)
3. "Shampoo and a Miracle Please" (3.32)*
4. "I'm Not That Kind of Girl" (3.16)
5. "I'll See You When I See You" (3.41)

=== Side Two ===
1. "Dear Janet Reger" (3.19)
2. "What Would Jane Fonda Do?" (3.21)
3. "No Problem" (4.07)
4. "Getting It Right" (3.36)
5. "Traffic Jam" (3.09)

* A 40-second musical interlude occurs between tracks 3 and 4 (Side One)
All tracks were written by David Hentschel and Don Black.

== Personnel ==
=== Musicians ===
- Marti Webb - Lead and backing vocals
- David Hentschel - ARP 2600, Autoharp, Backing vocals, Bass Guitar, Clavinet, Drums, Electric Guitars, Emulator, Glockenspiel, Linn Drum Computer, Mark Tree, OBX, Percussion, Piano, Roland Rhythm Box, Solina synthesizers, Synclavier II, Vocoder, Yamaha CS-80
- Phil Palmer - Acoustic Guitars, Lead, and Rhythm Electric Guitars
- John Giblin - Bass Guitar
- Phil Collins - Drums
- Graham Jarvis - Drums
- Kiki Dee - Backing vocals
- Stevie Lange - Backing vocals
- Gary Osbourne - Backing vocals
- John Richardson - Backing vocals
- Alan Williams - Backing vocals
- Joy Yates - Backing vocals

=== Production credits ===
- Engineers - David Hentschel, Richard Manwaring, Alan Douglas, Steve Prestage
- Assistant Engineers - Howard Gray, Dave Bascombe
- Disc Cutting Engineer - Ray Staff at Trident Studios
