= Unexpected Song =

Single by Sarah Brightman
- Released: 1984
- Recorded: 1984
- Genre: Musical theatre
- Label: RCA Records
- Songwriters: music: Andrew Lloyd Webber lyrics: Don Black.

Sarah Brightman singles chronology
"Rhythm of the Rain" (1983)	"Unexpected Song" (1984)	"All I Ask of You" (1986)

"Unexpected Song" is a 1984 song from the musical Song and Dance originally sung (on Broadway) by Bernadette Peters. The music was written by Andrew Lloyd Webber, with lyrics by Don Black. It is one of Lloyd Webber's most frequently performed compositions.

== Background ==
The music for "Unexpected Song" originates from Lloyd Webber's instrumental album Variations, much of which became the dance music in the second half of Lloyd Webber's musical Song and Dance. Black wrote lyrics to one of the tracks, "Variation 5," which became "Unexpected Song." The song was released by Marti Webb and Justin Hayward as a duet in 1981. Later, Black wrote new lyrics to the melody and retitled the song "When You Want to Fall in Love." The original lyrics were re-instated when the show was re-written for Sarah Brightman's run. Brightman released the song as a single in 1984.

"Unexpected Song" was later used in Lloyd Webber's and Black's reworking of the show, returning to the original album title of Tell Me on a Sunday.

== Composition ==
"Unexpected Song" is a ballad.

== Chart performance ==
Brightman's single peaked at #76 on the UK Singles Chart.

== Track listing ==
1. "Unexpected Song"
2. "Come Back With the Same Look in Your Eyes"

== Covers ==
- Bernadette Peters on Song & Dance: Original Broadway Cast Recording (1985)
- Michael Crawford, with the London Symphony Orchestra, on Songs from the Stage and Screen (1987)
- Paul Jones on The Andrew Lloyd Webber Collection (1991)
- Clare Burt on Aspects of Andrew Lloyd Webber Volume 2 (1996)
- Michael Ball on Julian Lloyd Webber's Unexpected Songs (2006)
- Anthony Warlow on Best of Act One
- Denise Van Outen on Tell Me On a Sunday (2006)
- Myrra Malmberg on Unexpected: Myrra Malmberg Sings Lloyd Webber (1997)
- Dave Willetts on The Musicals Unplugged (2003)
- Marie Osmond on Unexpected (2021)
