= Encore (Marti Webb album) =

Album by Marti Webb

Studio album by Marti Webb
- Released: 1985
- Recorded: London
- Studio: Angel Recording Studios
- Label: Starblend Records
- Producer: John Altman

Marti Webb chronology
| I'm Not That Kind of Girl (1983) | Encore (1985) | Always There (1986) |

Encore is an album by Marti Webb released in 1985. It is her fourth solo studio recording. It was produced by John Altman for the Starblend Records label.

It features a recording of "Ben", written by Don Black and Walter Scharf, which was originally a hit single for Michael Jackson. Webb's version, the royalties of which were donated to a charity in memory of Ben Hardwick in conjunction with the BBC television series That's Life, peaked at #5 in the UK Singles Chart.

Encore peaked at #55 on the UK Albums Chart.

The album was re-released on compact disc in 1995 by Carlton Home Entertainment on their Hallmark label. It was retitled "If You Leave Me Now" and had an amended track order.

== Track listing ==
=== Encore ===
==== Side One ====
1. "Fantasy" (Gerard Kenny, Drey Shepperd)
2. "If You Leave Me Now" (Peter Cetera)
3. "Life On Mars" (David Bowie)
4. "It Had to Be You" (Gus Kahn, Isham Jones)
5. "Wind Beneath My Wings" (Jeff Silbar, Larry Henley)
6. "Ready for Roses Now" (Geoff Stephens, Don Black)

==== Side Two ====
1. "Ben" (Don Black, Walter Scharf)
2. "Love of My Life" (Freddie Mercury)
3. "My Foolish Heart" (Ned Washington, Victor Young)
4. "Part Time Love" (David Gates)
5. "When Love Was All We Had" (Don Black, Archie Jordan)
6. "All By Myself" (Eric Carmen)

If You Leave Me Now

Studio album by Marti Webb
- Released: 1995
- Label: Hallmark
- Producer: John Altman

=== If You Leave Me Now ===
1. "The Wind Beneath My Wings"
2. "My Foolish Heart"
3. "Ben"
4. "Life On Mars"
5. "Ready for Roses Now"
6. "When Love Was All We Had"
7. "It Had to Be You"
8. "Fantasy"
9. "Love Of My Life"
10. "All By Myself"
11. "Part Time Love"
12. "If You Leave Me Now"

== Personnel ==
- Executive Producer - Chris Harding
- Producer and arranger (Except "Ben") - John Altman
- Recording Engineer - John Timperly
- Harmonica solo on "It Had to Be You" - Paul Jones
- Special thanks to Tony Harding and Don Black
- Design - Gwyn Davies
- Recorded at Angel Recording Studios, London
