= Marti Webb =

English actress and singer

- Born: 13 December 1943 (age 82); Cricklewood, Middlesex, England
- Genres: Musical theatre, pop singer
- Occupations: Singer, actress
- Years active: 1959–present

Marti Webb (born 1943) is an English actress and singer. She appeared on stage in Evita before starring in Andrew Lloyd Webber's one-woman show Tell Me on a Sunday in 1980. This included her biggest hit single, "Take That Look Off Your Face", a UK top three hit, with the parent album also reaching the top three.

== Early life and education ==
Marti Webb was born in Cricklewood in 1943. Her parents took her to variety shows and pantomimes as a child. Her father played the violin and her mother sang and played the piano. She attended dance lessons from the age of 3 and first performed in public at the age of 7, at the Scala Theatre, London, initially hoping to be a ballerina.

After a school teacher suggested to her parents that her natural talent for singing and dancing should be nurtured, she was educated at the Aida Foster stage school from the age of 12, where she eventually became Head Girl. Her mother had to take an additional job to order to pay for the school fees. While training, she appeared in BBC Schools programmes. Webb later commented that, having come from a normal school, she found it a shock to be asked to perform in front of her classmates.

The first musical she saw was Lionel Bart's Fings Ain't Wot They Used T'Be as some of her fellow students were performing in it. The school would send students for auditions regularly, which led to an audition for the original London production of Bye Bye Birdie, although she wasn't offered a role. She also auditioned for Oscar Hammerstein II for The Sound of Music, but being overcome by shyness, spoke very quietly and wasn't cast in the show.

She was selected to take part in the television programme Carol Levis' Junior Discoveries, which was broadcast from the Hackney Empire, for which she sang "Musetta's Waltz" from La bohème.

== Career ==
=== Musical theatre ===
==== West End debut in Stop the World, I Want to Get Off ====
Aged 15, she appeared as Moonbeam in the 1959 Manchester production of Listen to the Wind by Vivian Ellis whilst still a student, before leaving school to make her West End debut in Stop the World – I Want to Get Off, a show that starred and had lyrics by Anthony Newley. She first discovered her belt voice while rehearsing for the show.

Webb performed "Almost Like Being in Love" as her audition piece, before a group that included Newley, Lionel Bart, Lionel Blair and Alma Cogan. The group shared a joke during her audition which distracted her and at the end of the piece, she grabbed her music and went to leave the stage. Newley had to stop her to ask for another song and she was so embarrassed, she dropped her sheet music across the stage. Newley later remarked that he'd loved her from that moment on. The company would go out together to watch other shows and performers, including Lotte Lenya and Ethel Merman.

==== First lead in Half a Sixpence ====
Webb first came to prominence as Ann Pornick in the original London production of Half a Sixpence opposite Tommy Steele, citing her first leading role as a career highlight. The playwright Beverley Cross's father George was the company manager on the production of Stop the World, I Want to Get Off and recommended his son audition Webb for the role. She was offered the role after thirteen auditions and later dubbed the singing voice of Julia Foster, her replacement for the film adaptation. Webb later commented of Foster, "She has quite a notable voice, so it's not too hard to pick it up."

She also played Nancy in the first UK tour of Oliver! where she met and befriended the show's assistant stage manager Cameron Mackintosh, who was to become one of the most prominent musical theatre producers in the world. Lionel Bart, the show's composer and lyricist, saw it numerous times whilst the production was in Manchester, where he was working on the notorious flop, Twang!!. When it returned to the West End Phil Collins, who later achieved fame with Genesis and had been one of the original Dodgers, rejoined the production to play Noah Claypole. On the production's transfer to the West End in April 1967, Barry Humphries played Fagin. In 1968, she appeared opposite Stuart Damon in the first British production of the musical Grass Roots, written by Gretchen Cryer and Nancy Ford, which was directed by Anton Rodgers at the Leatherhead Theatre Club.

During the 1970s, Webb carved out a career as a respected, though not yet famous, West End actress and singer. In 1971, she was one of the original company of the London production of Godspell, the musical based on the Gospel of Matthew, opposite David Essex, Julie Covington and Jeremy Irons. The original London cast recording of the production includes her performance of "Bless the Lord". During the show's run, Essex formed a band with Jeff Wayne and recruited Webb and Covington as backing singers.

She left Godspell to play Nellie Cotterill in the 1973 original London production of The Card, a musical written by Tony Hatch and Jackie Trent which chronicled the rise of the title character from washerwoman's son to mayor of a Northern British town through initiative, guile and luck.

The production was short-lived but was followed by the 1974 original London production of The Good Companions, alongside John Mills, Judi Dench and Christopher Gable in which she played Susie Dean, a member of a touring concert party. She was flown to Manchester to join the show during its tryout when the original actress Celia Bannerman, whose voice had proved unsuitable for the role, left the production.

==== Evita and Tell Me on a Sunday ====
After failing to land any stage roles as the decade wore on, by 1978 a somewhat dejected Webb was working in a travel agency and had stopped auditioning. A British lyricist came into the agency and encouraged her to start auditioning again, and within three months she was cast in Evita.

In early 1979, Webb was flown to New York to audition for Harold Prince after Gary Bond, then playing Che in the show, suggested her to the producers of Evita as a successor to Elaine Paige who was, at the time, expected to transfer to the recreate the role on Broadway. Prince was impressed and persuaded her to cover while Paige holidayed and sign up as a regular alternate for the remainder of Paige's contract, performing two shows a week, in preparation for succeeding Paige as the star. This began an arrangement which existed for the remainder of the show's run, with Stephanie Lawrence appearing as Webb's alternate before succeeding her.

At her original audition, show's composer Andrew Lloyd Webber had asked whether she would be interested if he wrote anything he thought appropriate for her voice. Assuming it was a kindly rejection, she was later surprised to be invited for a meal at Mr Chow, a London restaurant, with Lloyd Webber and the lyricist Don Black to discuss the concept of a song cycle inspired by the story of a friend of the writers who had moved from London to the United States to begin a new life.

Webb was asked to collaborate on the piece when only two songs, the title piece "Tell Me on a Sunday" and "It's Not the End of the World", had been written, so the rest was created specifically with her voice and character in mind. Black, who became her manager and a close friend, said of her performance, "She was 'the girl', and that was it." Her tendency to, "Talk for hours about the most boring everyday things, like the gas or insurance", also inspired him in creating the narrative pieces in the song cycle which were letters to the character's mum.

She worked on the piece with Lloyd Webber and Black each day before being driven from Sydmonton Court, Lloyd Webber's country house, to the Prince Edward Theatre where Evita was playing. An album was recorded and it was performed at the 1979 Sydmonton Festival, the composer's annual workshop for new works, where a BBC Television producer contracted the collaborators to produce a version for television featuring Webb backed by a band and the London Philharmonic Orchestra. A one-off performance in January 1980 was recorded at the Royalty Theatre, London. Black recalls, "It was fantastic on television because it was almost all filmed in close-up on Marti Webb's face. Every eyebrow raised, every look registered. It was a brilliant piece of TV, like one of Alan Bennett's Talking Heads series, but sung."

Recorded in the autumn of 1979, the album of Tell Me on a Sunday was released and the television programme aired in February 1980 just as Webb took over the eponymous role in Evita. It was a No. 2 hit in the UK Albums Chart and saw Webb become a household name. The lead single, "Take That Look Off Your Face", was a similar success, reaching No. 3 in the UK singles chart.

Webb has a distinctive, untrained coloratura voice and Lloyd Webber was said to have told her "You sing in my keys". She agreed, "You write in mine." She has since regularly performed at his Sydmonton Festival. He produced her second solo album Won't Change Places (1981) which featured the lead single "Your Ears Should Be Burning Now".

In January 2014, Webb again performed Tell Me on a Sunday initially for a week at the St. James Theatre, London, then for a fortnight at the Duchess Theatre.

Contrary to the 2004 revival, the show featured largely the original 1979 album tracks, with a few lyric amendments, plus the song "The Last Man in My Life", written for the show's incarnation as Song and Dance in 1982. The production came about after Webb met a commissioning editor for BBC Radio 2 at a concert honouring Don Black in late 2013 at which she'd performed two songs from the piece. Asked whether she could still do the whole show, she suggested that, with a small band, it could be recorded for radio broadcast. The producer Robert Mackintosh then suggested a week's run prior to the recording, the popularity of which led to another three weeks at a second theatre. The recording was broadcast on BBC Radio 2, alongside an interview with Lloyd Webber and Black conducted by Anneka Rice.

Webb later performed the show for two nights at the Kenton Theatre, Henley-on-Thames, in September 2015.

==== Work with Don Black ====
At the meal to discuss the Tell Me on a Sunday project, Lloyd Webber asked Don Black, who had maintained parallel careers as a lyricist and as the manager to Matt Monro, to become Webb's personal manager, a role he undertook from 1979 until the early 1990s, when he became too busy with work on Sunset Boulevard. He found her a new manager and they've remained close: "Uncle Don and Auntie Shirl have always been there for me."

During 1981 and 1982, Webb recorded her next album, I'm Not That Kind of Girl, which was eventually released in 1983. Although not based on a musical, the album had a running story concerning a woman who is reunited with a former lover. The album culminates with her on the way to their wedding. The songs were composed by David Hentschel and Don Black and were very much in a contemporary pop vein. Phil Collins played drums on the album and Kiki Dee contributed backing vocals. Despite the album's strong pedigree in terms of personnel, it failed to chart and was Webb's final album on the Polydor label.

In 1985 she scored her next big hit when she recorded a cover version of Black's song, "Ben", which had been originally released by Michael Jackson. It was produced in memory of Ben Hardwick, who died shortly after becoming Britain's youngest liver transplant patient and whose story was publicised on the BBC television programme That's Life!. Andrew Lloyd Webber saw the show and suggested the idea of a charity recording to Black, who mentioned that Webb was recording an album at the time. The single reached No. 5 in the UK Singles Chart and was included on her 1985 album, Encore.

In 1986, Black wrote lyrics to the theme of the BBC television drama Howards' Way and the single "Always There" was the result, produced by its composers Simon May and Leslie Osbourne. It became a UK top-20 hit and inspired an album of the same name in which she covered other television themes. The album, which peaked at No. 65 in the UK Albums Chart, was later released on compact disc entitled Marti Webb Sings Small Screen Themes. The previous year, Webb had recorded the theme to the ITV television series To Have and To Hold, but for contractual reasons, the theme was re-recorded and released by the composer Johnny Worth's wife Catherine Stock. Webb, herself, re-recorded it for the Always There album.

She presented a BBC Radio 2 documentary about the career of Don Black that was broadcast in early 1995, appeared in a concert tribute to him on his 70th birthday that was broadcast on BBC Radio 2 in August 2008, performed at a BBC Electric Proms event with the lyricist in October 2009 and sang two songs during another concert tribute in 2013.

==== Later career ====
In 1982 Tell Me on a Sunday was combined with Lloyd Webber's other successful album Variations, which had featured his brother, cellist Julian Lloyd Webber, to create the show Song and Dance. The first act saw Webb reprise her role as the unnamed girl, a performance for which she was nominated for a Laurence Olivier Award. In the second act Wayne Sleep and a dance troupe performed choreographed routines to the music from Variations. The pair toured with the show in the latter half of the decade.

In the mid-1980s, she again succeeded Elaine Paige, as Grizabella in the musical Cats both in the West End production at the New London Theatre and subsequently on a UK tour. A commemorative roll of honour, marking a century of the Blackpool Opera House, lists significant performers at the theatre between 1889 and 1989, beginning with Wilson Barnett and ending with Webb, due to her time with the show there.

In 1983, alongside Sarah Brightman and Gary Bond, Webb appeared in an early workshop version of Lloyd Webber's musical Aspects of Love at his Sydmonton Festival.

In 1995, at the age of 50, Webb reprised her leading role in a UK tour of Evita, opposite Chris Corcoran as Che and Duncan Smith as Peron. Despite some criticism over her age, the popularity of the tour, produced by Robert Stigwood and David Land with the orchestrations, stage design and direction of the original 1978 London production, led to it being extended throughout 1996. The beginning of the tour also saw the release of an album entitled Music and Songs from Evita as part of Pickwick Records' The Shows Collection series to which Webb contributed a number of tracks.

Between July and September 1997, Webb appeared in Divorce Me, Darling, the sequel to The Boyfriend, at the Chichester Festival Theatre. The cast also included her former husband Tim Flavin.

In 2003, she joined the UK touring production of The King and I, taking over from Stefanie Powers in the role of Anna Leonowens opposite Ronobir Lahiri as The King. Elaine Paige, Webb's predecessor in Evita and Cats had appeared in the London version of the production three years earlier. Later in 2003, she appeared in the original London stage production of Thoroughly Modern Millie uniquely alternating the role of Mrs Meers with Maureen Lipman, to allow Lipman to care for her terminally ill husband, the English playwright Jack Rosenthal.

At the beginning of the following year, she again reprised her role in Tell Me on a Sunday, first for a limited run before the closure of the show in the West End and subsequently on tour. The show had been substantially rewritten for a production starring Denise van Outen, but a combination of the new and original scores was created specifically for Webb. She appeared in many of the principal venues on the tour, but in other locations the show was performed by Faye Tozer and Patsy Palmer.

In 2007, Webb performed alongside Sheila Ferguson and Rula Lenska in a UK touring production of Hot Flush, a new musical about the menopause. She played Helen, a middle-aged widow whose daughter had recently left home. She also appeared on Elaine Paige on Sunday, a show on BBC Radio 2, during which she selected a number of 'Essential Musicals'.

From September to December 2008, she appeared as Mrs Johnstone in the long-running UK tour of Willy Russell's musical Blood Brothers, succeeding Linda Nolan who left due to illness. The producer of the show, Bill Kenwright had been trying to persuade Webb to play the role for around 20 years and she was only free by chance. As Nolan was ill, she had just a week and a half to rehearse, around half the time normally expected for the rehearsal of such a tour. Birmingham-born Niki Evans was playing the role in the West End at the time, so while the tour visited Birmingham, Webb briefly took over in the London production to allow Evans to play her home city.

Webb starred as Aunt Eller in Oklahoma!, touring the UK throughout 2011. Mark Evans, who had previously appeared in the BBC show Your Country Needs You, played Curly.

Throughout 2012 Webb appeared as Dorothy Brock, a past-her-prime prima donna in a UK tour of 42nd Street. Dave Willetts and Bruce Montague also toured with the cast.

==== Recent work ====
In 2017, she played Jacqueline in the first UK tour of the musical La Cage Aux Folles opposite John Partridge and Adrian Zmed, produced by Bill Kenwright.

In July and August 2018, Webb appeared opposite Tommy Steele in The Glenn Miller Story at the London Coliseum.

From January until August 2020, Webb was to have toured with the play The Cat and the Canary. It was curtailed by the industry-wide shutdown of performances as a result of the COVID-19 pandemic and relaunched in 2021.

In March 2022, she performed in The Unexpected Guest, as part of the Theatre Royal, Windsor's On Air season, which featured semi-staged productions of radio plays. In 2023, she appeared in A Murder Has Been Arranged and Blithe Spirit, as part of the same series.

From August to December 2023, she appeared as Celia in a UK tour of Calendar Girls the Musical. The production featured a revised score and book and was one of the last shows to be produced by Bill Kenwright.

=== Pantomime ===
Webb has spent many Christmas seasons in pantomime in venues throughout the UK. She was the Principal Boy, Robin Hood, in the 1987 London Palladium pantomime, Babes in the Wood, alongside Cannon and Ball, John Inman and Barbara Windsor. During her later career, she has played the Fairy Godmother or Wicked Queen characters. In 1997, she was a late replacement for Linda Robson in Cinderella in Croydon, when Robson became ill. She appeared in productions of Cinderella in Bath in 2000 and Malvern in 2001. In 2006 she played the Fairy Godmother in Snow White and the Seven Dwarfs at Theatre Royal, Windsor.

In 2018, Webb joined the cast of Dick Whittington at the Theatre Royal, Windsor, to play Fairy Bowbells, for the early part of the show's run. Anita Harris, who had originally been cast in the role, covered for Anne Hegerty's Queen Rat while the latter took part in I'm a Celebrity...Get Me Out of Here! Upon Hegerty's return to the UK, Harris resumed the role of the fairy. She returned to the Theatre Royal, Windsor, from November 2019 until January 2020, to perform in the pantomime Aladdin, alongside Paul Nicholas.

=== Concert work ===
After completing her run in the London production of Evita, Webb and Gary Bond played a series of concerts featuring Lloyd Webber's music. She has since regularly performed in concert alongside her appearances in musicals. She also performed a solo concert at the Warrington Festival in 1985. In 1993, she appeared opposite Michael Barrymore in a summer season at Blackpool Opera House.

Webb co-devised and starred in The Magic of the Musicals, a UK concert tour featuring songs from musical theatre, opposite Opportunity Knocks winner Mark Rattray. The show toured twice in 1991, before two follow up tours in 1992. The gold-selling album of the show was co-produced by Webb's former husband, sound engineer, Tom Button and her outfits designed by Bruce Oldfield. A performance at the Bristol Hippodrome was also filmed and broadcast on BBC Television. This was followed in 1993 by a North American and Canadian tour and numerous UK versions in the following years. In 1999 Dave Willetts was the co-star, followed by Robert Meadmore in 2002. Webb and Meadmore were joined by Wayne Sleep in 2006.

A live recording of her season of cabaret performances with broadcaster David Jacobs at London's Café Royal was released in 1998 as Marti Webb Sings Gershwin: The Love Songs. Featuring material from her earlier Gershwin recording, the album was co-produced by Webb and West End sound designer Mick Potter.

She has performed her cabaret show on a number of P&O cruise ships, including the MV Arcadia in 2009 and 2010.

In 2016, Webb gave a series of solo concerts. She also performed at These Are a Few of My Favourite Songs: with Don Black at the Royal Albert Hall.

From 2016 onwards, Webb has performed a number of cabaret concerts at The Pheasantry, London, including Dreams Lost, Dreams Found, a show in which she performed a mixture of the songs with which she is closely associated and those from shows that she did not have the opportunity to appear in. In January 2021, she performed the concerts in Malvern.

=== Television ===
Particularly since coming to fame through Tell Me on a Sunday, Webb has regularly performed on British television. In the 70s and 80s she appeared on the BBC TV show, The Good Old Days, on one occasion performing the song "Sing Us One of the Old Songs, George", a piece which became her own for the show. Prior to her performance in Evita, though, she appeared in the television series The Songwriters, about songwriting partnerships. The final episode of the series featured Andrew Lloyd Webber and Tim Rice and she first met the pair, briefly, while recording the programme.

In 1982, Webb recorded a second television special, Marti Webb: Together Again, which was broadcast on BBC Two. It also featured David Essex, Christopher Gable and Angela Richards.

=== Recording ===
After Tell Me on a Sunday, she recorded a number of solo albums, including some live work, and more recently Limelight featuring a mix of her best known material and then latest productions.

As well as the charity recording of "Ben" in 1985, Webb also contributed to a recording of "Bridge Over Troubled Water" in 1987, which was released in aid of those killed in the Hungerford massacre.

In summer 1987, she released Gershwin on BBC Records, to coincide with the fiftieth anniversary of George Gershwin's death.

In 1990, on the last studio collaboration between Alan Parsons and Eric Woolfson, the album Freudiana, Webb performed two songs: the solo Don't Let the Moment Pass and No One Can Love You Better Than Me in which she joined forces with Woolfson, Gary Howard and Kiki Dee. She also performed background vocals on the album's closing number, There But for the Grace of God Go I.

=== Technique ===
Webb is unusual among musical theatre performers in that she never warms up her voice prior to a performance. She has said she wouldn't recommend this as a technique for other performers. She tries to eat sensibly and dislikes spending time in air-conditioned environments as they dry out the throat. The line in Tell Me on a Sunday, "I long to find a drink that hasn't got an ice cube in it," was included by Don Black in reference to Webb's genuine dislike.

== Personal life ==
Webb married three times and does not have any children. She was married to the actor Alexander Balfour in London in early 1964, but this later ended in divorce.

She married actor Tim Flavin in New York in April 1985 after a courtship of just two weeks but he had a number of affairs during their marriage which ended in divorce in 1986.

She subsequently married sound engineer Tom Button, some two decades her junior, in New York in January 1992. The couple, who met working on a production of Cats in Blackpool in 1989, separated some years later.

A keen gardener, during the 1980s, she had a house in Fulham, South West London and a country home in Chichester, West Sussex. She then kept an apartment in Westminster, London, for many years. Since the early 1990s, she has lived in a cottage in Langport, Somerset, which she shared with her mother, Selina, before her death. During the 1970s, she owned a 1967 Rolls-Royce Silver Shadow. Webb was at one time a patron of The Players Music Hall Theatre in London, which specialises in Victorian variety theatre.

Webb appeared on the BBC Radio 4 programme Desert Island Discs in May 1982. She selected the "Piano Concerto No.1 in B Flat Minor" by Tchaikovsky; "Una voce poco va" from The Barber of Seville; "The Swan" from The Carnival of the Animals; "Oh Happy Day" by the Edwin Hawkins Singers; "Layla" by Derek and the Dominos; "Bridge Over Troubled Water" by Simon & Garfunkel; and "Space Oddity" by David Bowie. Her favourite selection was a recording of "The Dreaded Batter Pudding Hurler of Bexhill-on-Sea" from The Goon Show. She also chose to take an illustrated dictionary and piano to her imaginary island.

In early 2014, she said that she had been treated for an aggressive form of bowel cancer in 2006, just a month after the death of her mother. The illness was not made public at the time and in fact Webb returned to the stage, including dancing in a pantomime, just two months after major surgery.

In a 2016 interview, she described herself as being semi-retired.

== Stage appearances ==
Show	Role	Year	Production	Theatre
Listen to the Wind	Moonbeam	1958-1959		New Shakespeare Theatre, Liverpool
Pillar to Post		1960		Grand Theatre, Blackpool
Stop the World – I Want to Get Off		1961-1962	Original production, UK Tour and London	Palace Theatre, Manchester; Theatre Royal, Nottingham; Queen's Theatre, London
Aladdin and His Wonderful Lamp	Princess Badroulbadour	1962-1963	Pantomime	Arts Theatre, Ipswich
Half a Sixpence	Ann	1963-1964	Original production, London	Cambridge Theatre, London
My Perfect Husband		1965	Summer season	Grand Theatre, Blackpool
Oliver!	Nancy	1965-1967	Original UK tour	Various then Piccadilly Theatre, London
Grass Roots	Eugenie	1968	Original British production	Leatherhead Theatre Club
Godspell		1971-1972	Original London production	Roundhouse, London Wyndhams Theatre, London
The Card	Nellie Cotterill	1973	Original production	Bristol Old Vic (tryout) Queen's Theatre, London
The Good Companions	Susie Dean	1974-1975	Original production, Manchester tryout before London opening	Palace Theatre, Manchester (tryout); Her Majesty's Theatre, London
The Great American Backstage Musical	Kelly Moran	1978	Original production	Regent Theatre, London
Evita	Eva Perón	1979-1981	Original production (Alternate to Elaine Paige from 7 May 1979 and headlining from 4 February 1980–2 May 1981)	Prince Edward Theatre, London
Tell Me on a Sunday	The Girl	1980	Special performance for BBC Television filming	Royalty Theatre, London
The Seven Deadly Sins	Anna I	1981	English National Opera production	London Coliseum, London
Song and Dance	The Girl	1982-1983	Original production	Palace Theatre, London
Cats	Grizabella	1983–1984, 1985	Original production	New London Theatre, London
Song and Dance	The Girl	1984	UK tour	Palace Theatre, Manchester; Theatre Royal, Plymouth; Birmingham Hippodrome
Babes in the Wood	Robin Hood	1987–1988	Pantomime	London Palladium
Song and Dance	The Girl	1988	UK tour	Various
Cats	Grizabella	1989	First UK tour	Winter Gardens, Blackpool; Edinburgh Playhouse; Gaiety Theatre, Dublin
Song and Dance	The Girl	1990	UK tour	Various
Dick Whittington	Dick	1994–1995	Pantomime	Marlowe Theatre, Canterbury
Evita	Eva Perón	1995–1996	UK tour	Various
Divorce Me, Darling!	Hannah van Husen	1997	Chichester Festival production	Chichester Festival Theatre
Cinderella	Fairy Godmother	1997–1998	Pantomime	Ashcroft Theatre, Croydon
The Goodbye Girl	Paula McFadden	1998	UK tour	Various
Annie	Miss Hannigan	1999	UK tour	Lyceum Theatre, Sheffield; Theatre Royal, Plymouth
Dick Whittington	Fairy Bowbells	1999–2000	Pantomime	Richmond Theatre, London
Dinner with George	Sue Turner	2000	UK tour	Various
Cinderella	Fairy Godmother	2000–2001	Pantomime	Theatre Royal, Bath
Cinderella	Fairy Godmother	2001–2002	Pantomime	Malvern Theatre
The King and I	Anna Leonowens	2002–2003	UK tour, taking over from Stefanie Powers	Various
Thoroughly Modern Millie	Mrs Meers	2003	Original UK production, alternating with Maureen Lipman	Shaftesbury Theatre, London
Snow White and the Seven Dwarfs	Wicked Queen	2003–2004	Pantomime	Bournemouth Pavilion
Tell Me on a Sunday	The Girl	2004	Rewritten London production, taking over from Denise van Outen	Gielgud Theatre, London
Tell Me on a Sunday	The Girl	2004	UK tour, alternating with Patsy Palmer and Faye Tozer	Various
Jack and the Beanstalk	Fairy	2005-2006	Pantomime	His Majesty's Theatre, Aberdeen
The Adventures of Snow White and the Seven Dwarfs	Wicked Queen	2006-2007	Pantomime	Theatre Royal, Windsor
Hot Flush!	Helen Thomas	2007	Original UK tour	Various
Blood Brothers	Mrs Johnstone	2008	UK tour and London production (for two weeks)	Phoenix Theatre, London; Sands Centre, Carlisle; Assembly Rooms, Derby; Grand Opera House, York
Oklahoma!	Aunt Eller	2010	UK tour	Various
42nd Street	Dorothy Brock	2012	UK tour	Various
Tell Me on a Sunday	The Girl	2014	Reprise of original album version	St James Theatre, Duchess Theatre, London
Tell Me on a Sunday	The Girl	2015	Reprise of original album version	Kenton Theatre, Henley-on-Thames
La Cage Aux Folles	Jacqueline	2017	First UK tour	Various
The Glenn Miller Story	Helen	2018	Short season	London Coliseum
Dick Whittington	Fairy Bowbells	2018–2019	Pantomime	Theatre Royal, Windsor
Aladdin	Empress Huawei	2019–2020	Pantomime	Theatre Royal, Windsor
The Cat and the Canary	Susan Sillsby	2020, 2021	UK tour	Various
The Unexpected Guest	Mrs Warwick	2022	Short season	Theatre Royal, Windsor
Pygmalion	Mrs Eynsford-Hill	2023	Short season	Theatre Royal, Windsor
A Murder Has Been Arranged		2023	Short season	Theatre Royal, Windsor
Blithe Spirit on Air	Mrs Bradman	2023	Short season	Theatre Royal, Windsor
Calendar Girls the Musical	Celia	2023	UK tour	Various

== Filmography ==
Show	Role	Year	Details
Carroll Levis Junior Discoveries	Performer	1958	
Lolita	Uncredited	1962	Played an uncredited friend
Show Time '63	Guest performer	1963	Performed songs from Half a Sixpence with Tommy Steele
Woman's Hour	Guest	1963	Interviewed about Half a Sixpence
Royal Variety Performance	Performer	1963	Performed songs from Half a Sixpence at the Prince of Wales Theatre
My Perfect Husband	Cast member	1965	An excerpt from the Blackpool production
The Good Old Days	Guest performer	1966	
Half a Sixpence	Dubbing artist	1967	Uncredited singing voice of Ann
Gazette: In Loving Memory	Terri	1968	
ITV Playhouse: The Best Pair of Legs in the Business	May, the receptionist	1968	
The Spinners	Guest performer	1969	Recording at the Octagon Theatre, Bolton
BBC Play of the Month: Stephen D	Singer	1972	
David Essex	Guest performer	1977	Performed songs from Godspell alongside other original cast members
The Mike Douglas Show	Performer	1977	
The Songwriters	Ensemble	1978	
The Good Old Days	Guest performer	1978, 1983	
Tell Me on a Sunday	The Girl	1980	The televised version of the original album
Top of the Pops	Performer	1980	
The British in Love	Performer	1980	Performed "The Long and Winding Road"
The Night of One Hundred Stars	Performer	1980	A recording of a live show at the National Theatre, Olivier
The Val Doonican Show	Guest performer	1980, 1981	
Des O'Connor Tonight	Guest performer	1980, 1981, 1985	
Friday Night, Saturday Morning	Guest	1980	
Starburst	Performer	1980	
Won't Change Places	Presenter and performer	1981	A Marti Webb special, with guests Paul Nicholas, Julian Lloyd Webber and Rod Argent
The Val Doonican Show	Guest performer	1981, 1982	Appeared in two episodes during 1981
A Royal Gala – The Palace Reopens	Performer	1981	A concert to celebrate the reopening of the Palace Theatre, Manchester
A Century of Song	Guest performer	1981	Recording of a concert at the Royal Albert Hall
The Two Ronnies	Guest performer	1981	Performed "He Made Me Laugh"
Nice to See You	Performer	1981	
Together Again	Presenter and performer	1982	A Marti Webb special, with guests David Essex, Christopher Gable and Angela Richards
Marti Caine	Guest performer	1982	
Parkinson	Guest	1982	Appeared alongside Andrew Lloyd Webber
Six Fifty-Five	Performer	1983	Performances of songs from I'm Not That Kind of Girl
Paul Squire, Esq	Guest performer	1983	
Pebble Mill at One	Performer	1983	Performances of six songs from I'm Not That Kind of Girl
A Royal Concert of Carols	Performer	1983	
It's Max Boyce	Guest performer	1984	
3-2-1	Guest	1984, 1986	
A Question of Sport	Guest	1984	
Halls of Fame	Gracie Fields	1985	Recording of a concert at the Palace Theatre, Manchester
Loose Ends	Guest panelist	1985	Appeared in two episodes during 1985
That's Life	Guest performer	1985	Performed the single "Ben"
Lyrics by Tim Rice	Guest performer	1985	Performed "All Time High" and "I Don't Know How to Love Him"
Give Us a Clue	Guest	1985	
A Royal Night of One Hundred Stars	Performer	1985	
Royal Gospel Gala	Performer	1986	Recording of a concert at the Royal Albert Hall
Royal Variety Performance	Gracie Fields	1986	Recorded at Theatre Royal, Drury Lane
Blankety Blank	Guest panelist	1986	Guested alongside Rory Bremner, Harry Carpenter, Vince Hill, Liz Robertson and Barbara Windsor
The Guinness Book of Records Hall of Fame	Guest performer	1986	Performed a medley of songs by Andrew Lloyd Webber
Shout!	Performer	1986	
Pebble Mill at One	Guest	1986	
New Faces of 86	Panellist	1986	
Des O'Connor Tonight Live	Guest	1986	
The Andrew Lloyd Webber Story: A South Bank Show Special	Contributor	1986	Clip of Webb performing "I Don't Know How to Love Him"
Pamela Armstrong	Guest	1986	
Cliff From the Hip	Guest performer	1986	Performed "Always There" and a duet with Cliff Richard: "All I Ask of You"
The Ronnie Corbett Show	Guest performer	1987	
Hudson and Halls	Guest	1987	
Cleo Laine Sings The Best of British	Guest performer	1987	
The Les Dawson Show	Guest performer	1989	
The Music of the Night with Jose Carreras	Guest performer	1989	Appeared alongside Carreras, Stephanie Lawrence and Jane Harrison
Happy Birthday, Coronation Street!	Performer	1990	Performed "Take That Look Off Your Face"
Royal Variety Performance	Guest performer	1991	
The Magic of the Musicals	Performer	1992	Recording of the concert tour at the Bristol Hippodrome. Broadcast on BBC One.
The Music Game	Guest	1993	
Songs of Praise	Guest performer	1994	
The Olivier Awards telecast	Award presenter	1996	Presented the award for Best Lighting Designer
Meridian Masterclass	Presenter	1997	
This is Your Life	Guest	1997	Guested on an edition in honour of Justin Hayward
Call My Bluff	Guest	1998	
Songs of Praise	Guest performer	2001	Performed "I Don't Know How to Love Him" from Jesus Christ Superstar
Breakfast	Interviewee	2004	Interviewed about returning to Tell Me on a Sunday
Songbook: Don Black	Performer	2010	Performed "Ben", "Tell Me on a Sunday", "Take That Look Off Your Face" and "As If We Never Said Goodbye"
The Many Faces of...	Interviewee	2011	Interviewed about Judi Dench
The Story of Musicals	Interviewee	2012	Discussed her role as Nancy in Oliver!
The Paul O'Grady Show	Performer	2013	Performed a selection of Don Black's songs
Michael Grade's Stars of Musical Theatre	Interviewee	2014	Discussed her role as Nancy in Oliver!
The Alan Titchmarsh Show	Interviewee and performer	2014	Interviewed about the upcoming production of Tell Me on a Sunday and performed the title song
Diamonds Are Forever: The Don Black Songbook	Performer	2014	Performed "Take That Look Off Your Face" and "Tell Me on a Sunday"
Love Your Weekend	Interviewee	2024	Interviewed about her career

== Radio ==
Show	Role	Year	Details
Woman's Hour	Interviewee	1963	Interviewed about her role in Half a Sixpence
Show Time '63	Performer	1963	Performing songs from Half Sixpence with Tommy Steele
Stage Door Johnnies	Performer	1977	
Saturday Night is Gala Night/ A Century of Song	Performer	1981	
Desert Island Discs	Castaway	1982	
The Spinners and Friends	Performer	1982	
String Sound	Performer	1982	
The Players	Interviewee	1986	Interviewed about her memories of The Players' Theatre, London
Gala Concert	Performer	1986	
Roger Royle	Interviewee	1986	Interviewed as a judge of the BBC Choir Girl of the Year competition
Woman's Hour	Performer	1989	
Maestro	Guest	1992-3	Guest player in multiple editions of the quiz
Don Maclean	Performer	1992	
Let's Do the Show Right Here!	Guest	1993	Guest in two editions of the quiz
Marti Webb and Mark Rattray in Concert	Performer	1993	
Marti Webb	Presenter	1994	Presenting a one-off show including her favourite songs
The Don Black Songbook	Presenter	1995	Presenting a retrospective of Don Black's career
Who Could Ask for Anything More	Performer	1996	
Friday Night is Music Night	Performer	1997	
The Greatest Story Ever Told	Interviewee	1997	Interviewed about her role in Godspell
The World of Anthony Newley	Interviewee	1998	Interviewed about her work with Anthony Newley, particularly in Stop the World, I Want to Get Off
Life Before Lloyd Webber	Interviewee	2000	
Elaine Paige on Sunday	Interviewee	2008	Interviewed about her 'Essential Musicals', which were Carnival!, West Side Story, Man of La Mancha, Evita and Flower Drum Song.
Lyrics by Don Black	Performer	2008	
Great British Songbook Masterclass with Don Black	Performer	2009	

== Discography ==
=== Solo albums ===
Title	Year	UK Albums Chart peak position	Label	Notes
Tell Me on a Sunday	1980	2	Really Useful Records/Polydor	
Won't Change Places	1981		Really Useful Records/Polydor	
I'm Not that Kind of Girl	1983		Polydor	
Encore	1985	55	Starblend	Later released on CD as Marti Webb: The Album and If You Leave Me Now
Always There	1986	65	BBC Records and Tapes	
Gershwin	1987		BBC Records and Tapes/Carlton Home Entertainment	
Marti Webb Sings Small Screen Themes	1988		BBC Records and Tapes	Reissue of Always There on CD
Performance	1989		First Night Records	
The Magic of the Musicals	1992	55	Flying Music/Music Club	Credited to Marti Webb and Mark Rattray
Music and Songs from Evita	1995		Pickwick	Recording also featured Dave Willetts, Carl Wayne and Jess Conrad
If You Leave Me Now	1995		Hallmark	Reissue of Encore with tracks reordered
Marti Webb Sings Gershwin: The Love Songs	1998			A live recording, self financed by Webb
Limelight	2003			Self financed by Webb

=== Cast recordings ===
Title	Year	Label	Role	Notes
Stop the World – I Want to Get Off: The Original Cast Recording	1961	Decca		
Half a Sixpence: An Original Cast Recording	1963	Decca	Ann Pornick	Re-released by That's Entertainment in 1983.
Half a Sixpence: A New Recording	1967	Marble Arch Records	Ann Pornick	Lead vocal on "I Know What I Am"; Duet with Roy Sone on "Half a Sixpence"
Half a Sixpence: Original Sound Track Recording from the Paramount Picture	1967	RCA Victor	Voice of Ann Pornick; dubbed for Julia Foster	Lead vocal on "I Don't Believe a Word", "I'm Not Talking to You" and "I Know What I Am"; Duet with Tommy on Steele "Half a Sixpence"
Stars of the London Production Sing Songs from Fiddler on the Roof	1968	Hallmark Records		Vocals on "Matchmaker, Matchmaker"
Godspell: Original London Cast Recording	1971	Bell Records		Lead vocal on "Bless the Lord"
The Card: Original Cast Recording	1973	Pye Records	Nellie Cotterill	Lead vocal on "That Once a Year Feeling" and "I Could Be the One"; Duet with Jim Dale on "Opposite Your Smile"
The Good Companions: Original Cast Recording	1974	EMI	Susie Dean	Lead vocal on "Stagestruck" and "Stage Door John"
Der Führer – Rock Opera	1977	Harvest	Eva Braun	
The Songwriters: Vol 1 - From the BBC TV Series	1978	BBC Records and Tapes		Lead vocals on "Ta-Ra-Ra-Boom-De-Ay" and "20th Century Blues", duet with Peter Gale on "I'll See You Again" and ensemble vocals on "Play, Orchestra, Play"
Song and Dance: Original Cast Recording	1982	Polydor		Lead vocals on first disc; Duet with Wayne Sleep on "When You Want to Fall in Love"
Freudiana	1990	EMI		Lead vocal on "No One Can Love You Better Than Me" and "Don't Let the Moment Pass"
Divorce Me, Darling: Original Cast Recording	1997	Digital TER	Hannah Van Husen	Lead vocal on "Here Am I, But Where's the Guy?"'; Duet on "You're Absolutely Me"

=== Singles ===
Title	B-side	Year	UK singles chart peak position	Label	Parent album	Notes
D-Darling	An extract from the theme 'Gone Fishing'	1973		Orange	N/A	With Michael Goodall
"Take That Look Off Your Face"	"Sheldon Bloom"	1980	3	Really Useful Records/Polydor	Tell Me on a Sunday	Also peaked at number 61 in Australia.
"Tell Me on a Sunday"	"You Made Me Think You Were in Love"	1980	67	Really Useful Records/Polydor	Tell Me on a Sunday	
"Your Ears Should Be Burning Now"	"Nothing Like You've Known"	1980	61	Really Useful Records/Polydor	Won't Change Places	
"I've Been in Love Too Long"	"I Won't Change Places"	1980		Really Useful Records/Polydor	Won't Change Places	
"Unexpected Song"	"Angry and Sore"	1981		Polydor	Won't Change Places	A duet with Justin Hayward
"All I Am"	"I Won't Change Places"	1981		Polydor	Won't Change Places	Double A-side
"Don't Cry for Me Argentina"	"I've Been in Love Too Long"	1981		Polydor	Won't Change Places	Double A-side
"The Last Man in My Life"	"Come Back with the Same Look in Your Eyes"	1982		Really Useful Records/Polydor		Studio recording. A live version of "The Last Man in My Life" is included on Song & Dance: Original Cast Recording released concurrently.
"Getting It Right"	"For the Touch of Your Love"	1982		Polydor	I'm Not That Kind of Girl	
"I'm Not That Kind of Girl"	"One Afternoon"	1982		Polydor	I'm Not That Kind of Girl	
"Didn't Mean to Fall in Love"	"Seven Outside Mr Chows"	1983		Polydor	I'm Not That Kind of Girl	
"For the Touch of Your Love"	"Didn't Mean to Fall in Love"	1983		Polydor	I'm Not That Kind of Girl	Recorded during I'm Not That Kind of Girl sessions but not included on album
"Ben"	"Nothing Ever Changes"	1985	5	Starblend	Encore	Recorded in aid of the Ben Hardwick Fund
"Ready for Roses Now"	"If You Leave Me Now"	1985		Starblend	Encore	
"Always There"	"Howards' Way (Theme from the BBC TV Series)"	1986	13	BBC Records and Tapes	Always There	Vocal version of the theme from Howards' Way
"I Could Be So Good for You"	"It's Still the Same Dream"	1986		BBC Records and Tapes	Always There	A-side also features Paul Jones
"Someday Soon (Theme from 'The Onedin Line')"	"Moonlighting (Theme from 'Moonlighting')"	1987		BBC Records and Tapes	Always There	
"I Can't Let Go – Theme from 'Dreams Lost Dreams Found'"	"Why Forget"	1987	65	Rainbow Records	N/A	
"Memory" [Elaine Paige]	"Take That Look Off Your Face"	1988		Old Gold	N/A	
"In One of My Weaker Moments"	"Tell Me on a Sunday"	1989		First Night Records	Performance	Recorded with The Philharmonia Orchestra. "Tell Me on a Sunday" is a new recording.
"Don't Let the Moment Pass"	"Freudiana (Instrumental)"	1990		EMI	Freudiana	

=== Compilation albums ===
Album	Year	Tracks
Andrew Lloyd Webber: The Premiere Collection	1988	"Take That Look Off Your Face"; "Tell Me on a Sunday"
Magic from the Musicals	1991	"Send in the Clowns"; "If He Walked Into My Life"; "I Don't Know How to Love Him"
The Don Black Songbook	1993	"Tell Me on a Sunday"; "The Last Man in My Life"; "Anyone Can Fall in Love"; "Always There"; "Anything But Lonely"; "Love Changes Everything"
New Vintage: The Best of Simon May	1994	"Always There"
The Very Best of Andrew Lloyd Webber	1994	"Take That Look Off Your Face"; "Tell Me on a Sunday"
The Love Songs of Andrew Lloyd Webber	1997	
Everything's Coming Up Broadway Volume 1	1998	"All That Jazz"
Music of the Night	1998	"Tell Me on a Sunday"; "Take That Look Off Your Face"
Andrew Lloyd Webber: Gold	1999	"Take That Look Off Your Face"
Andrew Lloyd Webber: Now and Forever	2001	"Take That Look Off Your Face"; "Tell Me on a Sunday"; "I've Been in Love Too Love"
West End Girls	2001	"Love Changes Everything"
Andrew Lloyd Webber: Divas	2005	"Tell Me on a Sunday"
Andrew Lloyd Webber: 60	2008	"Take That Look Off Your Face"
Andrew Lloyd Webber: Unmasked	2018	"Take That Look Off Your Face"

=== Guest appearances ===
Album	Artist	Year	Appearance
The Last Song	Anthony Newley	2012	Duet with Newley on "Music of the Universe"
