= Won't Change Places =

Studio album by Marti Webb
- Released: January 1981
- Recorded: 1980
- Genre: Pop, MOR
- Label: Polydor
- Producer: Andrew Lloyd Webber

Marti Webb chronology
Tell Me on a Sunday (1980)	Won't Change Places (1981)	I'm Not That Kind of Girl (1983)

Won't Change Places is an album by Marti Webb released in 1981 as a follow-up to Tell Me on a Sunday.

As with her previous album, the recording was produced by Andrew Lloyd Webber for the Polydor label. It included a recording of "Don't Cry for Me Argentina" from the musical Evita in which Webb was appearing as Eva Perón at the time.

The album featured the singles "Your Ears Should Be Burning Now" and "I've Been in Love Too Long", and was released in early 1981. Of these, only "Your Ears Should Be Burning Now" was a chart hit. Additional singles "Don't Cry For Me Argentina" and "All I Am" (a version of which was also released around the same time by Heatwave on their "Candles" album") were released in South Africa. A few months later, "Unexpected Song", a duet with Justin Hayward, was also released as a single but was not featured on this album. Webb had her own BBC Two special called Won't Change Places, where she performed some of the songs on this album. It featured guests Andrew Lloyd Webber, Paul Nicholas and Rod Argent and was broadcast on 16 February 1981.

Reviews for the album were generally positive, with the Daily Mirror writing "Won't Change Places sees the star of Evita performing 10 sensational songs by some of the foremost songwriters including Lynsey De Paul, Andrew Lloyd Webber, Rod Argent, Don Black, Tony Macaulay and Tim Rice. Won't Change Places also includes Marti's hit "Your Ears Should Be Burning Now".

The album was released two years later in the US (Polydor 2442-186) and the American trade magazine Stereo Review reviewed it in May 1983 under the section "Recording of Special Merit", mentioning "All I Am", "Masquerade", "I've Been in Love Too Long" and "Don't" as stand out tracks.

In 2015, Lloyd Webber reused the melody of "I've Been in Love Too Long" as the opening track of School of Rock, "I'm Too Hot for You", albeit with different lyrics.

== Track listing ==
=== Side One ===
1. "I Won't Change Places" (Andrew Lloyd Webber, Don Black) - 3:28
2. "All I Am" (Lynsey de Paul) - 3:14
3. "Your Ears Should Be Burning Now" (Tony Macaulay, Black) - 3:53
4. "Angry and Sore" (Rod Argent) - 3:25
5. "Don't Cry for Me Argentina" (Tim Rice, Lloyd Webber) - 5:32

=== Side Two ===
1. "I've Been in Love Too Long" (Lloyd Webber, Black) - 3:19
2. "What You Gonna Do With Your Freedom" (Lynsey de Paul, Susan Sheridan) - 4:09
3. "Don't" (Jerry Leiber, Mike Stoller) - 3:50
4. "Masquerade" (Argent) - 4:16
5. "I Guess I'll Miss the Man" (Stephen Schwartz) - 3:11

== Personnel ==
- Andrew Lloyd Webber - Production and arrangement (tracks 1, 5, 6, 8, 10), cover concept
- Lynsey de Paul - Production (tracks 2, 7)
- Tony Macaulay - Production (track 3)
- Rod Argent - Production (tracks 4, 9)
- David Cullen - Assistant arrangement and orchestration (tracks 1, 10)
- Susan Sheridan - Assistant arranger (tracks 2, 7)
