= Marti Webb Sings Gershwin: The Love Songs =

Live album by Marti Webb
- Released: 1998
- Venue: Cafe Royal Green Room, London
- Label: Self released
- Producer: Marti Webb, Mick Potter

Marti Webb chronology
Music and Songs from Evita (1995)	Marti Webb Sings Gershwin: The Love Songs (1998)	Limelight (2003)

Marti Webb Sings Gershwin: The Love Songs is a live album by Marti Webb, recorded and released as a CD in 1998.

== Background ==
Webb had record deals with Polydor, BBC Records and Telstar during the 1980s, but her last solo studio had been Performance (1989). She performed on the live recording of The Magic of the Musicals (1992) and had tracks included on Music and Songs from Evita (1995).

The album was produced by self-financed and co-produced by Webb with West End sound designer Mick Potter featuring tracks taken from a series of cabaret performances at London's Café Royal Green Room. In 1987 she had released Gershwin, an album of songs by George and Ira Gershwin, some of which was incorporated into the show.

The album was only made available through the London musical theatre merchandise shop Dress Circle and at the venues on Webb's tours. The liner notes dedicate the album to "Selina Elizabeth", Webb's mother.

== Track listing ==
1. "How Long Has This Been Going On" (George Gershwin, Ira Gershwin)
2. "The Man I Love" (George Gershwin, Ira Gershwin)
3. "Embraceable You/But Not for Me" (George Gershwin, Ira Gershwin)
4. "A Foggy Day" (George Gershwin, Ira Gershwin)
5. "Someone to Watch Over Me" (George Gershwin, Ira Gershwin)
6. "Do It Again" (George Gershwin, Buddy De Sylva)
7. "Love Walked In/Our Love Is Here to Stay" (George Gershwin, Ira Gershwin)
8. "The Man That Got Away" (George Gershwin, Harold Arlen)
9. "He Loves and She Loves" (George Gershwin, Ira Gershwin)
10. "Finale"

== Personnel ==
=== Musicians ===
- Marti Webb - lead and backing vocals
- Andy Read - piano, musical direction
- Gary Branch - woodwind, saxophones
- Alyn Ross - double bass
- Mathew Senior - drums

=== Production credits ===
- Producers - Mick Potter and Marti Webb
- Arrangements - Andy Read, Gary Branch and Ian Hughes
