= Ben Hardwick =

British liver transplant recipient (1981–1985)

Benjamyn Paul Hardwick (6 December 1981 – 23 March 1985) was Britain's youngest liver transplant patient. He became a celebrity through appearing on the BBC television programme That's Life! after his parents appealed for more awareness of organ donation when their son, who suffered from biliary atresia, urgently needed a transplant. While he also became the first child in the country to receive a liver transplant, the initial transplant failed. After a second transplant the following year, he died of complications at the age of three. Following this event, at least £10,000 was raised in Hardwick's name to support other seriously ill children.

In his memory, his family set up the Ben Hardwick Memorial Fund, which aimed to offer financial support to the families of children who suffer from primary liver disease. British celebrity Esther Rantzen, who hosted That's Life! and co-wrote a book based on Ben's story, was a trustee on the fund's board. The Ben Hardwick Fund took over the work of the Ben Hardwick Memorial Fund in 1997. Esther Rantzen was patron of the present fund which helps children suffering from primary liver disease with costs associated with their illness.

In 1985, Marti Webb released as a tribute a cover version of the Michael Jackson song "Ben" which reached number 5 in the UK charts with all royalties being donated to the Memorial Fund.
