= The Jacksons Story =

Greatest hits album by The Jacksons
- Released: July 20, 2004 (original release); August 28, 2007 (re-release)
- Recorded: 1969–1982
- Genre: R&B, soul, pop
- Label: Hip-O Select/UTV Records

The Jackson 5/The Jacksons chronology
The Very Best of The Jacksons (2004)	The Jacksons Story (2004)	Gold (2005)

Professional ratings
Review scores
Source	Rating
AllMusic	link

The Jacksons Story is a greatest hits album initially released on Hip-O Select/UTV Records on July 20, 2004 and later re-released on August 28, 2007.

It covers 14 years of hit singles scored by the American R&B family group The Jackson 5/The Jacksons between 1969 and 1983. It includes the quintet's early years as the princes of Motown during the late 1960s and early 1970s and their disco innovations in the mid-1970s while still at Motown (1973), along with their later funk/disco period while recording for CBS Records and its two divisions: Philadelphia International (1976–1977) and Epic (1978–1982) during the late 1970s and early 1980s.

For further historical value, the collection also includes solo hit singles by the sole two Jackson brothers who scored solo success, Jermaine's 1980 smash "Let's Get Serious" and Michael's hits spanning from 1971's "Got to Be There", 1972's "Rockin' Robin" and "Ben", 1979's "Don't Stop 'Til You Get Enough" and 1983's "Billie Jean".

== Track listing ==
No.	Title	Writer(s)	Length
1.	"I Want You Back"	The Corporation (Berry Gordy, Freddie Perren, Deke Richards, Alphonzo Mizell)	2:59
2.	"ABC"	The Corporation	2:57
3.	"The Love You Save"	The Corporation	3:04
4.	"I'll Be There"	Berry Gordy, Bob West, Willie Hutch, Hal Davis	3:56
5.	"Mama's Pearl"	Berry Gordy, Alphonzo Mizell, Deke Richards, Freddie Perren	3:10
6.	"Never Can Say Goodbye"	Clifton Davis	3:00
7.	"Got to Be There"	Elliot Willensky	3:24
8.	"Rockin' Robin"	Leon René	2:32
9.	"Ben"	Don Black, Walter Scharf	2:47
10.	"Dancing Machine" (single version)	Hal Davis, Don Fletcher, Dean Parks	2:37
11.	"Let's Get Serious" (single version)	Lee Garrett, Stevie Wonder	3:34
12.	"Enjoy Yourself"	Kenneth Gamble, Leon Huff	3:25
13.	"Show You the Way to Go"	Kenneth Gamble, Leon Huff	5:27
14.	"Blame It on the Boogie"	Mick Jackson, Dave Jackson, Elmar Krohn	3:30
15.	"Shake Your Body (Down to the Ground)" (single version)	Michael Jackson, Randy Jackson	3:46
16.	"Lovely One" (single version)	Michael Jackson, Randy Jackson	3:45
17.	"This Place Hotel" (a.k.a. "Heartbreak Hotel") (single version)	Michael Jackson	4:50
18.	"Can You Feel It" (single version)	Michael Jackson, Jackie Jackson	3:51
19.	"Don't Stop 'Til You Get Enough"	Michael Jackson	6:04
20.	"Billie Jean"	Michael Jackson	4:53
