= Ben (song) =

1972 single by Michael Jackson

- Artwork for Spanish vinyl release

Single by Michael Jackson

from the album Ben
- B-side: "You Can Cry on My Shoulder"
- Released: July 12, 1972
- Recorded: November 1971
- Genre: Pop; adult contemporary
- Length: 2:44
- Label: Motown
- Songwriters: Don Black; Walter Scharf
- Producer: The Corporation

Michael Jackson singles chronology
"Ain't No Sunshine" (1972)	"Ben" (1972)	"With a Child's Heart" (1973)

Alternative release(s)
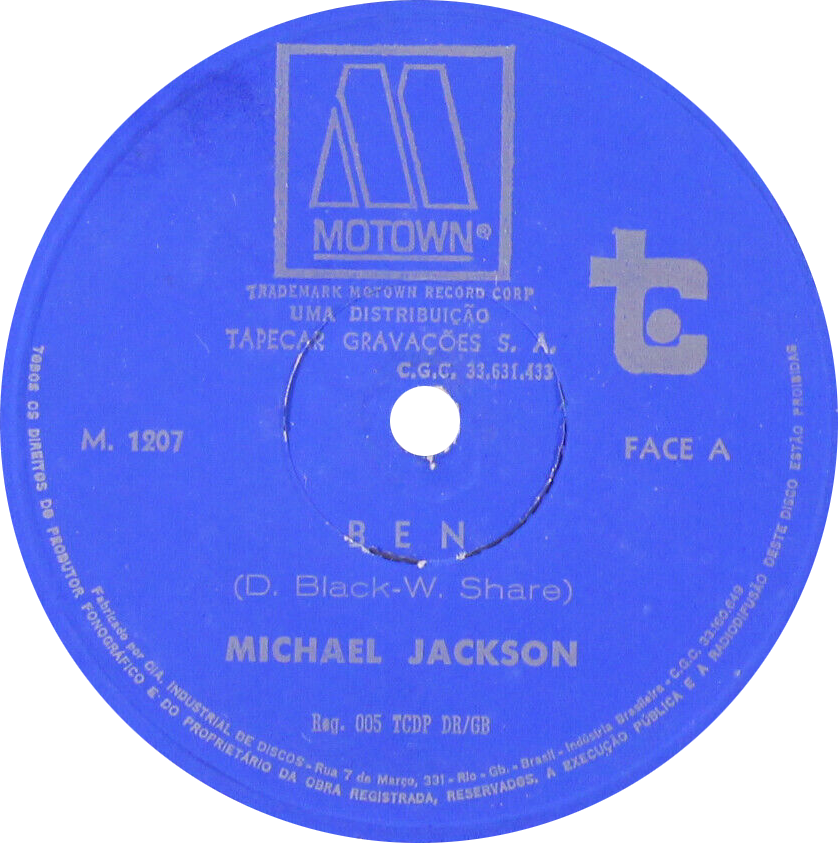
- Side A of the Brazilian single

"Ben" (often referred to as "Ben's Song") is a song written by Don Black and Walter Scharf for the 1972 film of the same name (a sequel to the 1971 killer rat film Willard). It was performed by Lee Montgomery in the film and by Michael Jackson over the closing credits. Jackson's single, recorded for the Motown label in 1972, spent one week at the top of the Billboard Hot 100, making it Jackson's first number one single in the US as a solo artist. Billboard ranked it as the number 20 song for 1972. It also reached number 1 on the ARIA Charts, spending eight weeks at the top spot. The song also later reached a peak of number 7 on the UK Singles Chart. In 2004, the song appeared in The Ultimate Collection.

"Ben" won a Golden Globe for Best Song. It was nominated for an Academy Award for Best Original Song in 1973, losing to "The Morning After" by Maureen McGovern from The Poseidon Adventure.

== Background ==
"Ben" was written for Donny Osmond, but he was on tour at the time and unavailable for recording, so Black and Scharf offered the song to Jackson instead. In addition to its one week at number 1 in the US, the song later reached a peak of number 7 on the British pop chart. "Ben" won a Golden Globe for Best Song. It was also nominated for an Academy Award for Best Original Song in 1973; Jackson performed the song in front of a live audience at the ceremony. Billboard called it a "beauty".

Although Jackson had already become the youngest artist to ever record a number 1 ("I Want You Back" with The Jackson 5, in 1970), "Ben" made him the third-youngest solo artist, at 14, to score a number 1 hit single. Only Stevie Wonder, who was 13 when "Fingertips" went to number 1, and Osmond, who was months shy of his 14th birthday when "Go Away Little Girl" hit number 1 in 1971, were younger.

The song is one of Jackson's most re-released, having appeared on The Jackson 5 Anthology, The Best of Michael Jackson, 18 Greatest Hits, Michael Jackson Anthology, Jackson 5: The Ultimate Collection, The Essential Michael Jackson, Michael Jackson: The Ultimate Collection, Hello World: The Motown Solo Collection, The Definitive Collection, The Jacksons Story, the North American version of Number Ones (even though here it is the 1981 live version), some versions of King of Pop, Icon, The Millennium Collection, The Very Best of The Jacksons and Michael.

Live recorded versions were released on the 1981 album The Jacksons Live! and Live at the Forum, and remixed versions have appeared on The Remix Suite, The Stripped Mixes and some versions of Immortal. After Jackson's death, singer Akon released a remix of the song with his own background vocals and Jackson's original vocal solo.

Osmond did record it later in his career, including it in his 2014 album The Soundtrack of My Life.

== Critical reception ==
AllMusic editor Lindsay Planer wrote about the success of the song: "Like much of the Motown empire at the time, the title track's multimedia exposure, coupled with strong crossover appeal, ensured that 'Ben' scored the artist his first Pop Singles' chart-topper". Rolling Stone editor Vince Aletti was not satisfied: "The title song is lovely, no doubt, and Michael packs it with a surprising amount of feeling (his delivery of 'They don't see you as I do/I wish they would try to' still tears me up) but it's all a little too thick for my tastes".

== Charts ==
=== Weekly charts ===
1972 weekly chart performance for "Ben"
Chart (1972)	Peak position
Australia (Kent Music Report)	1
Canada RPM Top Singles	6
Canada RPM Adult Contemporary	13
New Zealand (Listener)	18
South African Singles Chart	14
UK Singles (OCC)	7
US Billboard Hot 100	1
US Billboard Adult Contemporary	3
US Cash Box Top 100	2

1973 weekly chart performance for "Ben"
Chart (1973)	Peak position
Mexican Singles Chart	3
Irish Singles Chart	15
New Zealand (Listener)	18

2009 weekly chart performance for "Ben"
Chart (2009)	Peak position
Australian ARIA Singles Chart	14
Irish Singles Chart	24
UK Singles Chart	46

=== Year-end charts ===
1972 year-end chart performance for "Ben"
Chart (1972)	Position
Canada	18
US Billboard Hot 100	20
US Cash Box	45

1973 year-end chart performance for "Ben"
Chart (1973)	Position
Australia	12

== Certifications and sales ==
Certifications and sales for "Ben"
Region	Certification	Certified units/sales
Mexico	—	51,000
New Zealand (RMNZ)	Gold	15,000^{‡}
United Kingdom (BPI)	Silver	200,000^{‡}
United States	—	1,000,000
^{‡} Sales+streaming figures based on certification alone.

== Marti Webb version ==
"Ben"

Single by Marti Webb

from the album Encore
- B-side: "Nothing Ever Changes"
- Released: 1985
- Studio: Angel Recording Studios, London
- Label: Starblend Records
- Songwriters: Don Black; Walter Scharf
- Producer: John Altman

Marti Webb singles chronology
"For the Touch of Your Love" (1983)	"Ben" (1985)	"Ready for Roses Now" (1985)

In 1985, the song became a top 10 hit again in the U.K. when covered by Marti Webb as a tribute to Ben Hardwick, a young liver transplant patient. This version reached No. 5 in the U.K. Singles Chart and was one of Webb's biggest hits.

== Other cover versions ==
Crispin Glover performed a cover of the song, as well starred and directed a music video, to the 2003 remake of Willard. The video featured R. Lee Ermey (who also appears in the film) as a few male patrons, as well as Lindsay Beamish and Jane Jensen among the female extras.

Kipp Lennon of the band Venice performed a cover of the song on a 1991 episode of The Simpsons titled "Stark Raving Dad". Jackson himself appeared as a guest voice in this episode, but for contractual reasons, all of the singing lines his character had were given to Lennon. The song was also regularly performed live by rock band Faith No More during their reunion tour in 2010.

== See also ==
- List of number-one singles in Australia during the 1970s
- List of Billboard Hot 100 number ones of 1972
