= The Good Companions (musical) =

- Poster for the 1974 West End production
- Music: André Previn
- Lyrics: Johnny Mercer
- Book: Ronald Harwood
- Basis: The Good Companions by J. B. Priestley
- Productions: 1974 Manchester; 1974 London; 2000 San Francisco

The Good Companions is a musical with a book by Ronald Harwood, music by André Previn, and lyrics by Johnny Mercer. It is based on the 1929 novel of the same title by J. B. Priestley.

== Plot ==
The plot focuses on the trials and tribulations of a touring concert party known as the Dinky-Doos who are stranded in the English countryside when their manager absconds with the most recent box-office revenue and the lady pianist. Jess Oakroyd, an amiable man who has abandoned his shrewish wife, endears himself to the company with his homespun advice, and they invite him to join them as a carpenter, baggage handler, and dogsbody. Elizabeth Trant comes to their rescue when she decides to use her inheritance to finance the troupe and escape from her boring life in the Cotswolds.

Because of his habit of playing the piano late at night, songwriter Inigo Jollifant has been fired from his position at the Washbury Manor School in East Anglia, and he replaces the concert party's recently departed pianist, bringing with him banjo player and illusionist Morton Mitcham. As Miss Trant slowly achieves managerial authority, she encourages the troupe – which includes comedian Susie Dean and singer Jerry Jerningham – to change its name to The Good Companions.

The group continue their tour and eventually arrive at the Sandybay Pavilion, where they play to a full house when a storm forces passersby to seek shelter in the theatre. Their success leads Inigo to contact a music publisher, who buys his songs and arranges for an impresario to see The Good Companions in Sandybay. The producer signs Susie and Jerry for his new revue, and he secures the remaining members of the company bookings in high class towns like Bournemouth.

In the end, Miss Trant marries her solicitor, Susie heads to the West End, Inigo makes a fortune with his music, and Jess Oakroyd departs for Ontario, Canada to visit his daughter.

== Productions ==
After a tryout in Manchester, The Good Companions opened on July 11, 1974, at Her Majesty's Theatre in London and ran for 252 performances. The cast included John Mills as Jess Oakroyd, Judi Dench as Elizabeth Trant, Christopher Gable as Inigo Jollifant, Marti Webb as Susie Dean, Malcolm Rennie as Morton Mitcham, and Ray C. Davis as Jerry Jerningham. Webb replaced Celia Bannerman at short notice during the Manchester tryout when it was decided that Bannerman's singing voice wasn't up to the part. The score was orchestrated by Herbert W. Spencer and Angela Morley. An original cast album was released by EMI Records, with a compact disc version by DRG following in September 1992.

The concept of a concert party was foreign to American audiences, and a non-musical stage adaptation of the Priestley novel had closed on Broadway after only 68 performances in 1931 so, despite the popularity of the Previn/Mercer score, it was decided not to open a production in New York City.

When a proposed West End revival failed to materialize, Warner-Chappell London granted 42nd Street Moon, a San Francisco company whose mission is to present staged concert revivals of "lost" musicals, the rights to present the American premiere of The Good Companions, which it did in August 2000.

Mercer and Bing Crosby made two recordings of songs from the musical in October 1974.

== Musical numbers ==
Act One

- Goodbye ..... The Dinky-Doos
- Camaraderie ..... The Dinky-Doos
- Bruddersford ..... Jess and His Friends

All Mucked Up
The Pools
Aye, Lad

- Footloose

The Great North Road ..... Jess
Fancy Free ..... Miss Trant
On My Way ..... Inigo

- Pleasure of Your Company ..... Morton and Inigo
- Stage Struck ..... Susie
- Dance of Life ..... Miss Trant
- Pleasure of Your Company (Reprise) ..... Inigo
- The Pools (Reprise) ..... Jess
- Good Companions .... Morton, Inigo, and the Good Companions

Act Two

- Slippin' Around the Corner ..... Jerry
- A Little Travelling Music ..... The Company
- And Points Beyond ..... Jess and the Company
- Darkest Before the Dawn ..... Miss Trant
- Goodbye (Reprise) ..... The Good Companions
- Susie for Everybody ..... Susie and Inigo
- Ta, Luv ..... Jess
- I'll Tell the World ..... Susie, Jerry, and Inigo
- Stage Door John ..... Susie
- Ta, Luv (Reprise) ..... Susie and Jess
- Good Companions (Reprise) ..... The Good Companions
