= Tell Me on a Sunday =

Musical by Andrew Lloyd Webber and Don Black

- Original recording
- Music: Andrew Lloyd Webber
- Lyrics: Don Black
- Productions: 1979 Sydmonton Festival; 1980 BBC telecast As part of Song and Dance: 1982 West End; 1985 Broadway; As a one-act show: 2003 West End; 2004 UK tour 2008 Off-Broadway; 2008 Australia; 2010 UK tour 2011 Belgium; 2014 London revival 2016 St. Louis; 2021 Oslo

Tell Me on a Sunday is a musical with music by Andrew Lloyd Webber and lyrics by Don Black. A one-woman show, it has been performed by a number of female singers/actors, most notably Marti Webb, Sarah Brightman, and Bernadette Peters. A one-act song cycle, it tells the story of an ordinary English girl from Muswell Hill, who journeys to the United States in search of love. Her romantic misadventures begin in New York City, lead her to Hollywood, and eventually take her back to Manhattan.

== Background ==
The musical is based on an idea originally conceived by Tim Rice, who intended to develop it as a cycle of television shows with songwriting partner Andrew Lloyd Webber. The two relished working on a small-scale project following Evita. Shortly after they began working, however, Lloyd Webber realized Rice was writing specifically for Elaine Paige, with whom Rice was having an affair. Lloyd Webber felt that allowing Paige to appear in the series would suggest he approved of the relationship, so he decided to look for a new lyricist. He opted for Don Black who, following a successful stint in Hollywood (including an Academy Award for Best Original Song for "Born Free"), had begun writing for the theatre. Although it had proven to be unsuccessful, his Bar Mitzvah Boy had impressed Lloyd Webber, who thought Black would be a good match.

Rice's original concept had kept 'the girl' in the UK. It was Black who suggested she emigrate to the States. He quickly began writing lyrics for several tunes Lloyd Webber already had composed. It was their intent to present as complete a work as possible at the Sydmonton Festival in September 1979. The two decided to cast Marti Webb, who was portraying Eva Perón at the matinee performances of Evita, as their heroine, and the show was first presented at the 1979 Sydmonton Festival.

== Synopsis ==
'The girl' arrives in New York City, and tells her friend that she does not want to become a hard-bitten career woman or a user of men. Shortly after, she discovers her beau has been cheating on her with numerous other women and she walks out. She meets Hollywood producer Sheldon Bloom, who takes her to Los Angeles. Sheldon's career ambitions preclude his spending much time on a personal relationship and, after realizing life in the film capital is uneventful and Sheldon has been using her as a trophy girlfriend, 'the girl' returns to Manhattan.

Back in Greenwich Village, 'the girl' meets a salesman, and once again faces disappointment when she learns he frequently has been in town with other women when he supposedly was away on business. The two split up and she meets a married man. Intent on succeeding in her career and acquiring a green card, she is content with the noon-to-two relationship they share, until he announces he plans to leave his wife and marry her instead. She is horrified because not only does she not love him, but she realizes she's been using him, something she had vowed never to do. She sends him away and promises herself she will return to being the idealistic and ethical woman she was when she first arrived in the States.

'The girl' is the only person who appears on stage, despite having conversations with her friends and writing letters to her mum.

== Productions ==
=== Original album and broadcast ===
The positive reception at Sydmonton led to the show being recorded as an album. Following this, a special performance was filmed at the Royalty Theatre in London on 28 January 1980, and later broadcast on the BBC on 12 February 1980, although it was produced in 1979 according to the credits. The broadcast was a critical success and garnered high ratings, leading it to be repeated the following month. Following its transmission, the album reached #2 on the UK charts, and the single release of "Take That Look Off Your Face" reached #3. This success propelled Marti Webb into a household name, despite being in the theatrical business for twenty years. She followed this with a number of her own albums and two further top 20 singles.

The original version was broadcast again for the first time in over 40 years, on BBC Four, in 2023.

=== Song and Dance ===
Lloyd Webber decided the piece could work well on the stage if paired with another one-act piece. He previously had considered writing a brief operatic piece about the friendship between Giacomo Puccini and Ruggiero Leoncavallo, going so far as to compose a melody that would later become "Memory", but decided it would not fit well with the girl's saga. He tried adapting the Charles Dickens work The Signal-Man, but decided it was too gloomy and rejected it as well. Eventually he and Black set aside Tell Me on a Sunday and turned to other projects.

In 1982, the creative team decided to combine Tell Me on a Sunday with a ballet choreographed to Lloyd Webber's Variations, a classical piece based on the A Minor Caprice No. 24 by Paganini that had debuted at Sydmonton in 1977. Following some revisions, including a new song "The Last Man in My Life" and several changes to the lyrics, Tell Me on a Sunday became Act I of Song and Dance, which was staged at the Palace Theatre in London's West End. Marti Webb was again cast as 'the girl'. Over the course of its run, she was succeeded by Lulu, Gemma Craven, Liz Robertson, and Sarah Brightman. Opening on 26th March 1982 and closing on 31st March 1984, the production ran for 781 performances.

Following its closure, on 28th April 1984, a special performance of Song and Dance featuring Sarah Brightman performing Tell Me on a Sunday was filmed at the Palace Theatre and later broadcast on UK television.

Lyricist Richard Maltby Jr. was brought in to help adapt the show for an American audience, in anticipation of a Broadway run. Bernadette Peters was chosen for the role of 'the girl', who was now renamed Emma. It opened on 18 September 1985 to mixed reviews. Writing in the New York Post, Clive Barnes thought it was "the best thing that Lloyd Webber has written for the theater," but Frank Rich of the New York Times was not impressed, observing that "empty material remains empty, no matter how talented those who perform it. Emma is a completely synthetic, not to mention insulting, creation whom no performer could redeem." Peters went on to win the Tony Award for Best Performance by a Leading Actress in a Musical, but the show failed to win Best Musical or Best Original Score. Black, unimpressed that Peters had insisted on gathering background information about the character, later said he preferred the original London production and Webb's performance.

=== Subsequent productions as a stand-alone piece ===
Reverting to its one-act format, Tell Me on a Sunday was substantially rewritten, with five new songs and additional material by Jackie Clune, for a 2003 London production at the Gielgud Theatre. The BBC critic observed, "this may be the smallest show Lloyd Webber's ever written, but the score (to appropriately conversational lyrics by Don Black) contains several of his very best songs." Directed by Christopher Luscombe and starring Denise Van Outen, it ran for ten months. Marti Webb succeeded Van Outen and subsequently toured the UK with the show, alternating with former Steps vocalist, Faye Tozer, and actress Patsy Palmer.

In 2008 Maxine Linehan performed a one-act version of the show at the Laurie Beechman Theatre in New York. That same year, the Kookaburra Musical Theatre presented the Australian premiere starring Jolene Anderson, with Noni Hazlehurst and John Waters providing the voices of "Mum" and "Married Man" respectively. This production was performed in Sydney and Melbourne.

The show toured the United Kingdom, beginning on 30 August 2010 at Northampton's Royal Theatre and continuing until Autumn 2011. The tour starred Claire Sweeney as 'the girl' and was directed by Tamara Harvey. The script was again updated for the 21st century, and 'the girl' was rewritten as originating from Liverpool, Sweeneys' home city. The song list stayed closer to the original, although a new finale was added, "Dreams Never Run on Time", itself a rewrite of the song "Somewhere, Someplace, Sometime" from the 2003 version.

In late 2013, Marti Webb performed the songs "Tell Me on a Sunday" and "Take That Look Off Your Face" at a tribute show to Don Black, where she met Lewis Carnie, the Head of Programmes for BBC Radio 2, who asked if she would consider performing the entire piece again for broadcast on the station. Producer Robert Mackintosh then suggested the show could be staged for a week at the St James Theatre, London in January, the popularity of which saw it being restaged for three weeks at the Duchess Theatre in February and early March, with musical direction by Simon Lee.

In January 2016, Jodie Prenger starred in a revival at the Watermill Theatre in Newbury directed by Paul Foster before touring the UK. The production toured again, starring Prenger in June 2021.

== List of musical numbers ==
Original 1980 album

- "Take That Look Off Your Face"
- "Let Me Finish"
- "It's Not the End of the World (If I Lose Him)"
- "Letter Home To England"
- "Sheldon Bloom"
- "Capped Teeth and Caesar Salad"
- "You Made Me Think You Were in Love"
- "It's Not the End of the World (If He's Younger)"
- "Second Letter Home"
- "Come Back with the Same Look in Your Eyes"
- "Let's Talk About You"
- "Take That Look Off Your Face (Reprise)"
- "Tell Me on a Sunday"
- "It's Not the End of the World (If He's Married)"
- "I'm Very You, You're Very Me"
- "Nothing Like You've Ever Known"
- "Let Me Finish (Reprise)"

1984 Sarah Brightman London version

- "Take That Look Off Your Face"
- "Let Me Finish"
- "It's Not The End Of The World"
- "Letter Home"
- "Sheldon Bloom"
- "Capped Teeth And Caesar Salad"
- "Exit"
- "Capped Teeth And Caesar Salad (Reprise)"
- "It's Not The End Of The World (If He's Younger)"
- "Second Letter Home"
- "Unexpected Song"
- "Come Back With the Same Look in Your Eyes"
- "Let's Talk About You"
- "Take That Look Off Your Face (Reprise)"
- "Tell Me On a Sunday"
- "It's Not The End Of The World (Version 3)"
- "Married Man"
- "Third Letter Home"
- "Nothing Like You've Ever Known"
- "Finale"

1985 Broadway version

- "Take That Look Off Your Face"
- "Let Me Finish"
- "So Much to do in New York"
- "First Letter Home"
- "English Girls"
- "Capped Teeth and Caesar Salad"
- "You Made Me Think You Were in Love"
- "Capped Teeth and Caesar Salad (reprise)"
- "So Much to do in New York (II)"
- "Second Letter Home"
- "Unexpected Song"
- "Come Back with the Same Look in Your Eyes"
- "Take That Look Off Your Face (Reprise)"
- "Tell Me on a Sunday"
- "So Much to do in New York (III)"
- "Married Man"
- "Third Letter Home"
- "Nothing Like You've Ever Known"
- "Finale - Let Me Finish (reprise)"
- "What Have I Done?"
- "Take That Look Off Your Face"

2003 London production

- "Take That Look Off Your Face"
- "Let Me Finish"
- "It's Not the End of the World"
- "Goodbye Mum, Goodbye Girls"
- "Haven in the Sky"
- "First Letter Home"
- "Speed Dating"
- "Second Letter Home"
- "Tyler King"
- "Capped Teeth and Caesar Salad"
- "You Made Me Think You Were in Love"
- "Capped Teeth and Caesar Salad (Reprise)"
- "It's Not the End of the World (If He's Younger)"
- "Third Letter Home"
- "Unexpected Song"
- "Come Back With the Same Look in Your Eyes"
- "Let's Talk About You"
- "Take That Look Off Your Face (Reprise)"
- "Tell Me on a Sunday"
- "Who Needs Men"
- "It's Not the End of the World (If He's Married)"
- "Fourth Letter Home"
- "Ready Made Life/I'm Very You"
- "Let Me Finish"
- "Nothing Like You've Ever Known"
- "Fifth Letter Home"
- "Somewhere, Someplace, Sometime"

2010 UK tour

- "Let Me Finish"
- "It's Not the End of the World (If It's Over)"
- "Writing Home (For the First Time)"
- "Sheldon Bloom"
- "Capped Teeth and Caesar Salad"
- "You Made Me Think You Were in Love"
- "Capped Teeth and Caesar Salad (Reprise)"
- "It's Not the End of the World (If He's Younger)"
- "Writing Home (For the Second Time)"
- "Unexpected Song"
- "The Last Man in My Life"
- "Come Back With the Same Look in Your Eyes"
- "Take That Look off Your Face"
- "Tell Me on a Sunday"
- "It's Not the End of the World (If He's Married)"
- "Married Man"
- "Writing Home (For the Third Time)"
- "I'm Very You, You're Very Me"
- "Ready Made Life"
- "Let Me Finish (Reprise)"
- "Nothing Like You've Ever Known"
- "Writing Home (For the Fourth Time)"
- "Take That Look off Your Face (Reprise)"
- "Dreams Never Run on Time (Finale)"
