= Always There (Marti Webb album) =

Album by Marti Webb

- Original LP cover

Studio album by Marti Webb
- Released: 1986
- Studio: Angel Recording Studios, London
- Genre: Theme music
- Label: BBC Records
- Producer: Bruce Talbot & John Altman

Marti Webb chronology
Encore (1985)	Always There (1986)	Gershwin (1987)

Alternative cover
- 1988 CD cover, retitled Marti Webb Sings Small Screen Themes

Always There is the fifth solo album by English actress and singer Marti Webb, primarily known for her work in musical theatre, released in 1986 on the BBC Records label. It consists of theme tunes from television shows that had been given lyrics which are sung by Webb.

The title track, "Always There", reached No. 13 in the UK Singles Chart. The album, which peaked at No. 65 in the UK Albums Chart, was released in 1988 on compact disc, entitled Marti Webb Sings Small Screen Themes.

"He's Not You (Chi Mai)", "It's Still the Same Dream", "Someday Soon", "No One Will Ever Know You" and "I Don't Hurt Anymore" all had lyrics written by Don Black specifically for this album.

Webb had previously recorded another version of "To Have and to Hold" which was used as the on-screen theme to the sitcom of the same name.

== Track listing ==
Side one

1. "Always There” (Simon May, Don Black, Leslie Osborne) – Theme from Howard’s Way
2. "To Have and to Hold" (John Worth) – Theme from To Have and to Hold
3. "He’s Not You (Chi Mai)” (Ennio Morricone, Don Black) – Theme from The Life and Times of David Lloyd George
4. "I Could Be So Good for You" (Patricia Waterman, Gerard Kenny) – Theme from Minder
5. "It’s Still the Same Dream" (Kenyon Emrys-Roberts, Don Black) – Theme from To Serve Them All My Days
6. "Anyone Can Fall in Love" (Simon May, Don Black, Leslie Osborne) – Theme from EastEnders

Side two

1. "Someday Soon” (Khachaturian [arranged by John Altman] and Don Black) – Theme from The Onedin Line
2. "Cheers" (Gary Portnoy, Judy Hart Angelo) – Theme from Cheers
3. "No One Will Ever Know You" (Shostakovich [arranged by Harry Rabinowitz] and Don Black) – Theme from Reilly, Ace of Spies
4. "Moonlighting" (Al Jarreau, Lee Holdridge) – Theme from Moonlighting
5. "I Don’t Hurt Anymore" (Richard Rodney Bennett, Don Black) – Theme from Tender is the Night
6. "Only Love" (Vladimir Cosma, Norman Gimbel) – Theme from Mistral’s Daughter

== Production ==
- Orchestra arranged and conducted by John Altman
- Harmonica and extra vocals by Paul Jones (side 1, track 4 & side 2, track 2)
- Produced by Bruce Talbot and John Altman.
- Engineered and mixed at Angel Recording Studios by John Timperley
- Assistant engineer Gary Thomas

== Charts ==
Chart (1986)	Peak position
UK Albums Chart	65
