= Song and Dance =

1982 musical

- Music: Andrew Lloyd Webber
- Lyrics: Don Black; Richard Maltby Jr. (additional)
- Productions: 1982 West End; 1983 Australia; 1985 Broadway; 2007 Israel

Song and Dance is a musical comprising two acts, one told entirely in "Song" and one entirely in "Dance", tied together by a unifying love story.

The "Song" act is Tell Me on a Sunday, with lyrics by Don Black and music by Andrew Lloyd Webber, about a young British woman's romantic misadventures in New York City and Hollywood. The "Dance" act is a ballet choreographed to Variations, composed by Andrew Lloyd Webber for his cellist brother Julian, which is based on the A Minor Caprice No. 24 by Paganini.

== Background ==
The Song portion was written specifically for Marti Webb, and presented at the Sydmonton Festival in the summer of 1979. It was subsequently recorded and aired as a one-hour television special by the BBC the following January. The Dance portion was recorded in 1978, and nearly became incorporated into Cats. The opening sequence was utilized as the theme music for London Weekend Television's South Bank Show.

Producer Cameron Mackintosh proposed that the two pieces be combined under the umbrella title Song and Dance to acknowledge the primary aspect of each act, billing the piece as "a concert for the theatre".

Black altered some of the songs from the original album and worked with Lloyd Webber on new material: "The Last Man in My Life", "I Love New York" and "Married Man", the latter set to the same tune as "Sheldon Bloom". A new orchestration of the Variations for a sixteen-piece theatre orchestra was produced from the original symphonic version played by the London Philharmonic Orchestra but Harry Rabinowitz retained the baton for the stage production. "When You Want to Fall in Love", with a tune previously released by Marti Webb and Justin Hayward as "Unexpected Song" which itself was later added to the score, was used at the climax of the dance section to meld the two halves.

== Productions ==
=== 1982 London ===
The musical had its world premiere on March 26, 1982 at the Palace Theatre, where it ran for 781 performances, directed by John Caird. Marti Webb performed the Song half; she subsequently was succeeded in February 1983 by Gemma Craven, who had performed the show for a month during Webb's holiday in August the previous year. Craven was followed by Lulu and Liz Robertson. Carol Nielsson, Webb's original understudy took over the role with two hour notice when Lulu damaged her voice after a foldback monitor failed during a performance. The Dance portion was choreographed by Anthony Van Laast and featured Wayne Sleep and Jane Darling. Stewart Avon-Arnold also appeared as a contemporary dancer in the second act.

The set and lighting was designed by David Hersey, costumes by Robin Don, and sound by Andrew Bruce and Julian Beech.

The original recording of the London production was made live on the opening night using a recording studio then built into the Palace Theatre. The album was produced by Martin Levan, who also co-designed the sound system for the show.

Soon after the production closed, the show was filmed for a television broadcast, with Sarah Brightman and Wayne Sleep in the lead roles.

=== 1983 Australia ===
The Australian production of the musical opened at the Theatre Royal in Sydney on 4 August 1983. It featured Gaye MacFarlane and John Meehan in the leading roles.

=== 1985 Broadway ===
In anticipation of a Broadway run, director and lyricist Richard Maltby Jr. was approached to adapt the first act for an American audience. The Broadway production, choreographed by Peter Martins, opened on September 18, 1985 at the Royale Theatre conducted by John Mauceri, and closed on November 8, 1986, after 474 performances and seventeen previews. Bernadette Peters starred in Song for nearly thirteen months; she was succeeded by Betty Buckley for the final four weeks. Dance featured Christopher d'Amboise and Gregg Burge. Amongst the many changes to the show, the characters were all given names, with 'the girl' now known as Emma.

Singer-songwriter Melissa Manchester starred in a subsequent six-month US national tour of the show in 1987, starting in Dallas, Texas and ending in Tampa, Florida.

The Broadway production received eight Tony Award nominations, with Peters winning the award for Best Actress in a Musical.

The recording of the Broadway production, featuring Peters in the entire first act but none of the music from second act, was recorded in 1985 by RCA Victor.

== Synopsis ==
Song focuses on an English girl who has recently arrived in New York City. Following an argument with her boyfriend, they decide to break up. She writes to her mother in England about what happened, and that she has met a new man, Hollywood producer Sheldon Bloom, with whom she travels to California. She eventually realizes that Sheldon has only been using her as a trophy, and she ends things once and for all.

The woman returns to New York disappointed and meets a younger man who she finds more fulfilling. When he has to leave on a business trip, the woman can't bear to let him go. Her friend later comes over to tell her about the man's infidelity, and she asks him for the truth.

Depressed, the woman walks through the city streets. She meets a married man and reflects on whether their affair is wrong. The married man comes by to confess his love; however, she realizes that she has been using him. In the end she decides that it was not the end of the world to have no one.

Dance explores the story of the younger man, his various relationships and his commitment issues. At the end, the man sees the woman, and they make up, joining both at last in Song and Dance.

== Musical numbers ==
London

1. "Overture"
2. "Let Me Finish"
3. "It's Not the End of the World"
4. "Letter Home to England"
5. "Sheldon Bloom"
6. "Capped Teeth and Caesar Salad"
7. "You Made Me Think You Were in Love"
8. "Capped Teeth and Caesar Salad" (Reprise)
9. "It's Not the End of the World (If He's Younger)"
10. "Second Letter Home"
11. "The Last Man in My Life"
12. "Come Back with the Same Look in Your Eyes"
13. "Take That Look Off Your Face"
14. "Tell Me on a Sunday"
15. "I Love New York"
16. "Married Man"
17. "I'm Very You, You're Very Me"
18. "Let's Talk About You"
19. "Let Me Finish" (Reprise)
20. "Nothing Like You've Ever Known"
21. "Let Me Finish" (Finale)

Broadway

1. "Overture/Take That Look Off Your Face"
2. "Let Me Finish"
3. "So Much to Do in New York"
4. "First Letter Home"
5. "English Girls"
6. "Capped Teeth and Caesar Salad"
7. "You Made Me Think You Were in Love"
8. "Capped Teeth and Caesar Salad" (Reprise)
9. "So Much to Do in New York (II)"
10. "Second Letter Home"
11. "Unexpected Song"
12. "Come Back with the Same Look in Your Eyes"
13. "Take That Look Off Your Face" (Reprise)
14. "Tell Me on a Sunday"
15. "I Love New York/So Much to Do in New York"
16. "Married Man" (included on Original Broadway Cast recording, not performed on stage)
17. "Third Letter Home"
18. "Nothing Like You've Ever Known"
19. "Finale – Let Me Finish (Reprise)/What Have I Done?/Take That Look Off Your Face (Reprise)"

== Cast albums ==
The London Cast released an album on Polydor Records. (2683087). 1985 Broadway cast (Bernadette Peters) RCA Victor 68264 (Only The Songs segment. The Dance segment was not recorded)

=== Charts ===
Chart (1983)	Peak position
Australia (Kent Music Report)	92

== Critical reception ==
Reviewing the London production, the Financial Times theatre critic Michael Coveney claimed, "It is a long time since I have sat through a more ostentatious, less theatrically coherent evening."

In Frank Rich's review of the Broadway production for The New York Times, he wrote: "Miss Peters is more than talented: As an actress, singer, comedienne and all-around warming presence, she has no peer in the musical theater right now. In her half of Song & Dance, she works so hard you'd think she were pleading for mercy before a firing squad. Yet for all the vocal virtuosity, tempestuous fits and husky-toned charm she brings to her one-woman musical marathon, we never care if her character lives or dies."

John Simon, in The New York Magazine, noted that the unseen men seemed "nebulous and unreal, so too, does the seen woman", and in the Dance half, "things go from bad to worse." However, he wrote that "Miss Peters is an unimpeachable peach of a performer who does so much for the top half of this double bill as to warrant its immediate rechristening 'Song of Bernadette'. She not only sings, acts, and (in the bottom half) dances to perfection, she also, superlatively, 'is' ".

== Awards and nominations ==
Original London production

Year	Award	Category	Nominee	Result
1982	Laurence Olivier Award	Outstanding Achievement in a Musical		Nominated
1982	Laurence Olivier Award	Actress of the Year in a Musical	Marti Webb	Nominated

Original Broadway production

Year	Award Ceremony	Category	Nominee	Result
1986	Drama Desk Award	Outstanding Actress in a Musical	Bernadette Peters	Won
1986	Drama Desk Award	Outstanding Featured Actor in a Musical	Gregg Burge	Nominated
1986	Drama Desk Award	Outstanding Choreography	Peter Martins	Nominated
1986	Drama Desk Award	Outstanding Music	Andrew Lloyd Webber	Nominated
1986	Grammy Award	Best Musical Show Album		Nominated
1986	Tony Award	Best Musical		Nominated
1986	Tony Award	Best Performance by a Leading Actress in a Musical	Bernadette Peters	Won
1986	Tony Award	Best Performance by a Featured Actor in a Musical	Christopher d'Amboise	Nominated
1986	Tony Award	Best Original Score	Andrew Lloyd Webber, Don Black and Richard Maltby Jr.	Nominated
1986	Tony Award	Best Costume Design	Willa Kim	Nominated
1986	Tony Award	Best Lighting Design	Jules Fisher	Nominated
1986	Tony Award	Best Choreography	Peter Martins	Nominated
1986	Tony Award	Best Direction of a Musical	Richard Maltby Jr.	Nominated

== See also ==
- Tell Me on a Sunday
