= Tim Flavin =

American actor

- Born: January 13, 1959 (age 67); Houston, Texas, U.S.
- Education: Manchester College of Arts and Technology
- Occupation: Actor · theatre director

Tim Flavin (born January 13, 1959) is an American actor. Flavin was the first American to be presented with a Laurence Olivier Award, for his 1984 performance in Rodgers and Hart's On Your Toes at the Palace Theatre in London's West End.

== Early life and education ==
Flavin was born in Houston in 1959. He graduated from the Kinder High School for the Performing and Visual Arts and earned a certificate in education from the Manchester College of Arts and Technology in 2016.

== Career ==
Flavin has performed extensively on Broadway, West End, film, television, and as a voice artist for almost forty years. His theatre career prompted one critic to say, "When God created musicals, it was because he knew that Tim Flavin would come along."

From 2013 to 2021, Flavin worked as the director of musical theatre at the Arden School of Theatre. He also taught and directed at the Guildford School of Acting, London School of Musical Theatre, and the BRIT School. In 2021, Flavin joined Autistry Studios in San Rafael, California, as a mentor and theatre director.

== Filmography ==
=== Film ===
Year	Title	Role	Notes
2005	Stoned	American News Presenter	
2008	Hellboy II: The Golden Army	Newscaster	

=== Television ===
Year	Title	Role	Notes
1980	The Pirates of Penzance	Pirates and Police	Television film
1990	Coins in the Fountain	Steve	Television film
2004	The Long Firm	Johnnie Ray	Episode: "Ruby's Story"
2007	Nuclear Secrets	Joe Bulik	Episode: "The Spy from Moscow"
2008	Clone	Mark Travis	Episode: "The Librarian"
2010	Any Human Heart	Mr. Schmidt	Episode #1.3
2010	Dispatches	American voices	Episode: "Iraq's Secret War Files"
