= John Mole (musician) =

English bass guitar player

- Born: 25 April 1949; Stratford, London, England
- Died: 1 August 2006 (aged 57)
- Instrument: Bass guitar

John Mole (25 April 1949 – 1 August 2006) was an English bass guitar player.

== Early life ==
Mole was born in Stratford, London.

== Musical career ==
A member of Jon Hiseman's Colosseum II, he went on to work with fellow band members Gary Moore and Don Airey. He also played with the UK jazz-funk band Morrissey–Mullen during the late 1970s, and as a session musician, with artists such as Barbra Streisand and John Dankworth. He was the first-call bassist for Andrew Lloyd Webber, appearing on the latter's Variations album as well as the successful Cats and Starlight Express musicals during the 1980s and 1990s.
