= Take That Look Off Your Face =

1978 song written by Andrew Lloyd Webber and Don Black

Single by Marti Webb

from the album Tell Me on a Sunday
- B-side: "Sheldon Bloom"
- Released: January 1980
- Recorded: 1979
- Genre: Pop, Middle of the road, theatrical
- Length: 3:27
- Label: Polydor
- Songwriters: Andrew Lloyd Webber, Don Black
- Producer: Andrew Lloyd Webber

Marti Webb singles chronology
"D-Darling" (1973)	"Take That Look Off Your Face" (1980)	"Tell Me on a Sunday" (1980)

"Take That Look Off Your Face" is the title of a hit song by musical theatre composer Andrew Lloyd Webber. Collaborating with lyricist Don Black, it was written for the song cycle show Tell Me on a Sunday in 1978. It was sung and released by Marti Webb in 1980, and became a number 3 hit in the UK charts. The song was also popular in Ireland, and made it to number 1.

== Song details ==
The song is about a woman being told of her boyfriend's infidelity. The woman denies this initially, before rebuking her news-bearer (a girlfriend) with the revelation that she "knew before" and had done for some time. She also spends much of the song criticising her friend for rushing to break the "bad news" to her.

Despite having been written during the creative process for Tell Me on a Sunday, the song was not recorded during the album's principal sessions. Black reminded Lloyd Webber that they had missed a track, then entitled "You Must Be Mistaken". John Mole, the bass guitar player, improvised a part reminiscent of the arrangement style of Phil Spector, inspiring the rest of the orchestration. The track was recorded in one take, apart from a double tracking of the orchestra.

A briefer 3:02 edit of the song is included on the album, however, a longer 3:29 version was released as the single.

== Track listing ==
- Side A: "Take That Look Off Your Face"
- Side B: "Sheldon Bloom"

== Revisions ==
The lyrics were substantially rewritten by Richard Maltby Jr. for the original Broadway production of Song and Dance. The British productions of the show have always used the lyrics written by Black.

Black himself amended the line, "He's doing some deal up in Baltimore now" after realising that Baltimore is south of New York. In subsequent versions, the song's protagonist is said to be "down" in Baltimore.

For the 2003 production of Tell Me on a Sunday, the storyline instead placed the action in England prior to an emigration to New York, requiring some further revision of the lyrics to reference London instead.

== Charts ==
=== Weekly charts ===
Chart (1980)	Peak position
Australia (Kent Music Report)	61
Austria (Ö3 Austria Top 40)	3
Belgium (Ultratop 50 Flanders)	4
Netherlands (Dutch Top 40)	7
Netherlands (Single Top 100)	6
South Africa (Springbok Radio)	1
Switzerland (Schweizer Hitparade)	2
UK Singles (OCC)	3
West Germany (GfK)	3

=== Year-end charts ===
Chart (1980)	Position
Austria (Ö3 Austria Top 40)	11
Belgium (Ultratop Flanders)	48
Netherlands (Dutch Top 40)	54
Netherlands (Single Top 100)	52
Switzerland (Schweizer Hitparade)	14
West Germany (Official German Charts)	7

== Gitte Hænning version ==
A German-language version with lyrics by Michael Kunze, "Freu' dich bloß nicht zu früh", by the Danish singer Gitte Hænning spent 22 weeks in the German charts in 1980, peaking at no. 10. The song appeared on Gitte's album Bleib noch bis zum Sonntag!, a collection of songs from Tell Me on a Sunday, which won the 1980 Deutscher Schallplattenpreis for best German-language pop album.
