= Variations (Andrew Lloyd Webber album) =

Studio album by Andrew and Julian Lloyd Webber
- Released: 22 January 1978
- Genres: Classical crossover; progressive pop
- Label: MCA

Professional ratings
Review scores
Source	Rating
AllMusic	3/5 stars

Variations is a classical and rock fusion album. The music was composed by Andrew Lloyd Webber and performed by his younger brother, the cellist Julian Lloyd Webber.

The Lloyd Webber brothers were always very close but their two different careers (a rock musical composer and a classical cellist) meant that a collaboration seemed unlikely. The album was a result of a bet between the brothers on a football match between Leyton Orient and Hull City, with Andrew agreeing to write a cello piece for Julian if Orient drew or won.

As his subject, Andrew chose the theme of Paganini's 24th caprice and added 23 variations for cello and rock band. The work premiered at the 1977 Sydmonton Festival with rock band Colosseum II, featuring Gary Moore, Jon Hiseman and Don Airey being joined by Barbara Thompson (sax, flute), Rod Argent (piano, synthesizer, keyboards) and Julian Lloyd Webber (cello). It was subsequently rearranged and recorded in 1978. It reached Number 2 on the UK album charts.

The cover is based on the painting Frederick, Prince of Wales, and his sisters by Philip Mercier.

== Orchestral version ==
A version for full orchestra was recorded in 1986 at Abbey Road Studios with Julian Lloyd Webber as cello soloist. Orchestrated by David Cullen, it was performed by the London Philharmonic Orchestra conducted by Lorin Maazel and released on CD by Philips.

== Other adaptations ==
The work was used in musical Song and Dance (1982). The opening and closing variations have been rewritten by Laurence Roman for cello and piano, the latter of which Julian often uses as an encore, due to its amusing glissando down to Bottom A (forcing a mid piece retune) to conclude.

The opening theme is used as the theme to The South Bank Show (1978–2010) and "Variation 5" became "Unexpected Song" with lyrics by Don Black. "Variation 18" is an instrumental version of the title song from the first Rice and Webber musical, The Likes of Us (1965, unperformed until 2005). Also, the UK's children's programme The Book Tower (hosted by Doctor Who actor Tom Baker) adopted a section of "Variation 19" for its theme tune.

In Lloyd Webber's West End musical adaptation of the film School of Rock (2003), Dewey Finn and Ned Schneebly play Guitar Hero to the audience on an imaginary TV screen, and the Variations album is played. In addition, the chorus of the song "Stick it to the Man" is based on a note sequence from Variation 14.

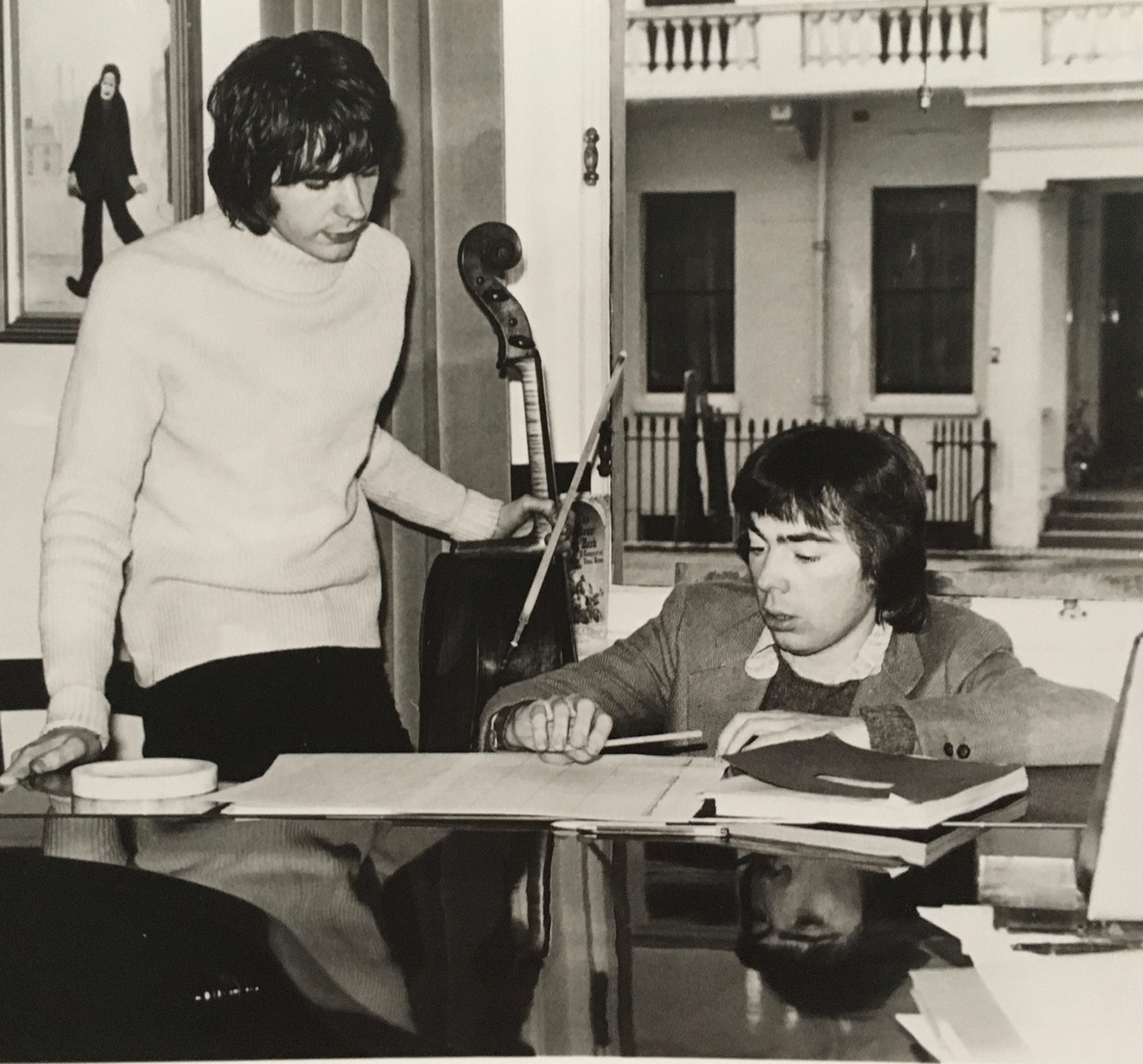
Brothers Julian Lloyd Webber and Andrew Lloyd Webber working at Variations in 1977.

== Track listing ==
1. "Introduction"
2. "Theme (Paganini Caprice in A minor No. 24) and Variations 1-4"
3. "Variations 5 and 6"
4. "Variation 7"
5. "Variation 8"
6. "Variation 9"
7. "Variation 10"
8. "Variations 11-15 (including the Tributes to Hank Marvin and Prokofiev)"
9. "Variation 16"
10. "Variations 13-14 Varied" (listed as 14-15)
11. "Variation 17"
12. "Variation 18" (Rachmaninoff's Variation 18)
13. "Variations 19, 20 and 5 Varied (listed as 6)"
14. "Variations 21 and 22"
15. "Variation 23"

== Personnel ==
Original rock version

- Julian Lloyd Webber – cello
- Gary Moore – Gibson Les Paul, Rickenbacker electric 12 string & Fender Stratocaster electric guitars, Guild acoustic guitar
- Rod Argent – grand piano, synthesizers (Minimoog, Roland RS-202, Yamaha CS-80)
- Don Airey – grand piano, synthesizers (ARP Odyssey, Minimoog, Solina String Ensemble), Fender Rhodes electric piano
- Barbara Thompson – flute, alto flute, alto and tenor saxophone
- John Mole – Fender Precision Bass, Hayman fretless bass guitar
- Jon Hiseman – Arbiter Auto-Tune drums, Paiste cymbals and gongs, percussion

with additional performers

- Andrew Lloyd Webber – synthesizer
- Dave Caddick – piano
- Bill Le Sage – vibraphone
- Herbie Flowers – bass
- Phil Collins – drums, percussion

Orchestral version

- Julian Lloyd Webber – cello
- Lorin Maazel – conductor
- London Philharmonic Orchestra

== See also ==
- Rhapsody on a Theme of Paganini (written by Sergei Rachmaninoff in 1934)
- List of variations on a theme by another composer
