= Angel Recording Studios =

British recording studio

Coordinates: 51.5378°N 0.1024°W

Angel Recording Studios Limited

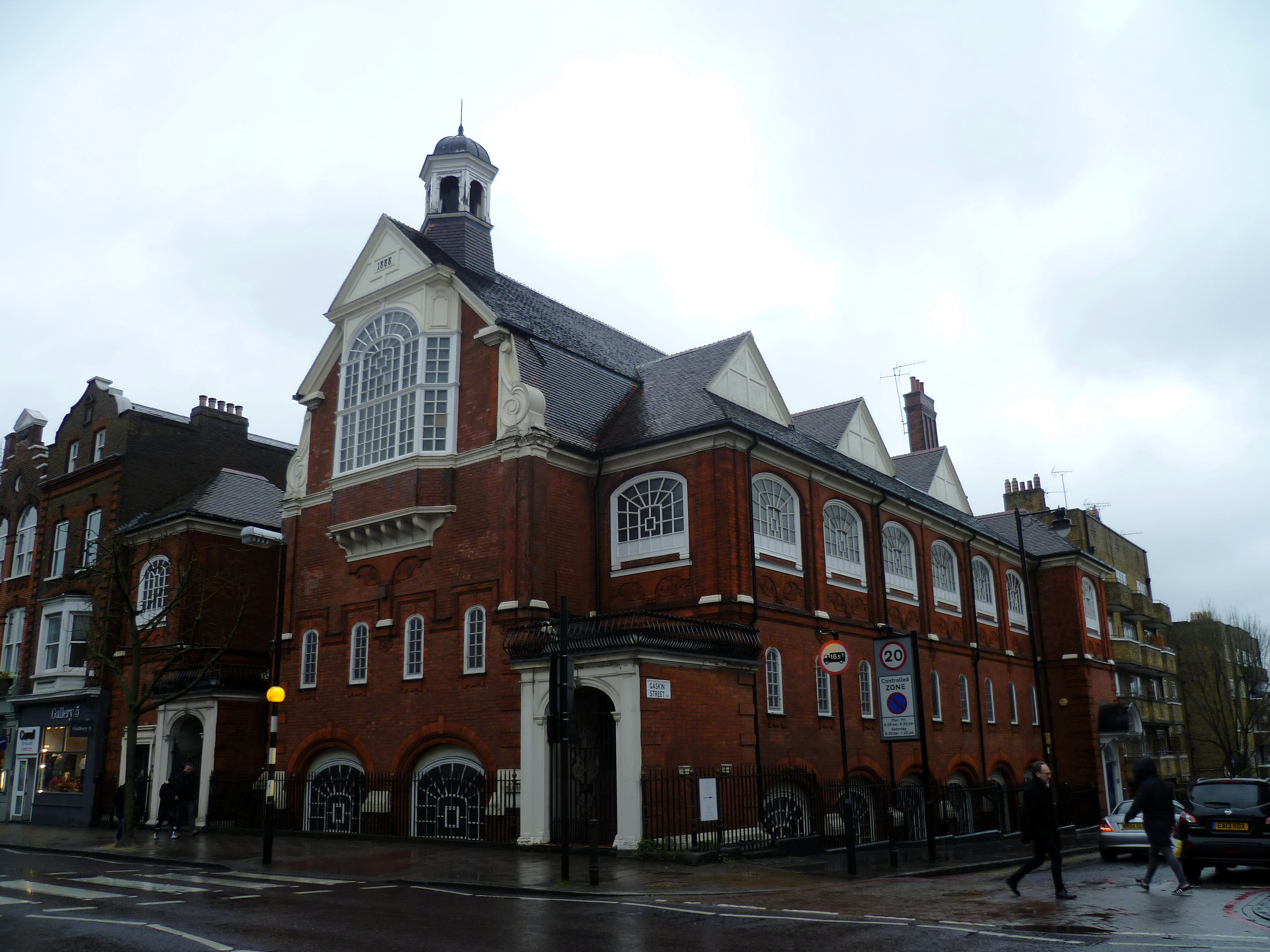
- Exterior of Angel Recording Studios
- Company type: Subsidiary
- Industry: Music industry
- Founded: 5 December 1978; 47 years ago
- Founder: James Warren Sylvester de Wolfe
- Headquarters: 311–312 Upper Street, Islington, London, England
- Parent: De Wolfe Music (until 2019); Abbey Road Studios (since 2022)

Angel Recording Studios Limited (also referred to as Angel Studios) is a British recording studio based in the eponymous recording and mixing complex in Islington, London. The company was incorporated by James Warren Sylvester de Wolfe on 5 December 1978. After ownership of the property transferred to third parties, the facility was closed at the end of 2019, but reopened after ownership transferred to Abbey Road Studios.

The building was originally constructed as a Congregational chapel in 1888, and is now Grade II listed. The premises were acquired by library music specialists De Wolfe Music in the late 1970s and opened in 1982. Since then, the studio has been used to record both commercially successful work such as Adele's 2011 album 21 and numerous classical recordings.

== Location ==
The studio is based on the corner of Upper Street (the A1) and Gaskin Street (formerly Church Street) in Islington, London, adjacent to St Mary's Church. The nearest tube station is Angel, which is approximately 0.5 kilometres (0.31 mi) distant.

== History ==
The building opened as the Islington Chapel in 1888, a Congregational chapel designed by architects Paull and Bonella and replacing an earlier chapel constructed in 1815 and redesigned in 1847–1848.

The building has been Grade II listed since 29 September 1972 and features a large number of original features inspired by Ancient House, Ipswich (also known as Sparrowe House) and the work of Richard Norman Shaw. It is constructed from Flemish bond red brickwork with stone dressing. The oriel windows feature cast iron glazing made by the St Pancras Iron Work Company. The 1888 construction date can be seen in a panel at the top of the building. The chapel's early 18th-century style organ made by Henry Speechly and Sons remains in situ, and in working order.

The chapel closed in 1979, and the building was purchased by De Wolfe Music. A major refurbishment and conversion project was undertaken, and recording began in 1982. The Cure and Siouxsie and the Banshees recorded at the studio the following year. By 1986, the complex could accommodate 100 musicians and mix to 35 mm and 16 mm. A third studio was added at the complex in 1987. Studio One received major refurbishment in 2001.

The studio closed down after De Wolfe's death in 2019. Three years later, it reopened as part of the Abbey Road Institute.

== Works ==
=== Music ===
Angel Recording Studios has been used by a number of popular recording artists over the years, including Grammy Award winning albums from Adele (21, one of the best-selling of the 21st century) and Sam Smith (In the Lonely Hour). Other bands and artists to use the studios include: Westlife, Rush, One Direction, Emeli Sandé, Slade, Little Mix, Louis Tomlinson, Gary Barlow, Plácido Domingo, Fela Kuti, Seal, Liza Minnelli, Florence and the Machine, Nightwish, Kylie Minogue, Goldfrapp, Karl Jenkins (for his acclaimed Adiemus project), and Robbie Williams.

=== Film and television ===
The studio's orchestra room has been used by Éric Serra who scored Léon: The Professional and the James Bond film GoldenEye there. George Fenton used the studio to record scores for natural history shows The Blue Planet and Planet Earth, while other projects have included Maury Yeston for Nine, Craig Armstrong, who scored Moulin Rouge! and Romeo + Juliet, and Anne Dudley for The Full Monty and Poldark. The studio has also been used to record the soundtracks to film The English Patient, The Crying Game, Buster, Memphis Belle, Pride and Prejudice, The Lion King, Jackie and Conclave. Television programmes which have used the studios include The Night Manager and Downton Abbey.
