= Sydmonton Festival =

Summer event

- Genre: Musical theatre
- Frequency: Annual
- Locations: Sydmonton Court, Hampshire
- Inaugurated: 1975
- Patron: Andrew Lloyd Webber

The Sydmonton Festival is a summer arts festival presented in a deconsecrated 16th century chapel on the grounds of Sydmonton Court, the country estate of Andrew Lloyd Webber. It is in Hampshire, located approximately 85 kilometres southwest of London, and was established in September 1975. Its purpose is to introduce new works to a private audience of individuals connected with theatre, television, and film in order to determine their future potential and viable commercialism.

Among the Lloyd Webber projects to receive their first public performances at the festival are Evita, Variations, Tell Me on a Sunday, Cats, Starlight Express, Aspects of Love, The Phantom of the Opera, Sunset Boulevard, Whistle Down the Wind, By Jeeves, The Beautiful Game, The Woman in White, The Likes of Us, and Love Never Dies. His Cricket received its second performance here.

Other projects to debut here include Nunc Dimittis, Masquerade, and Tomorrow Shall Be My Dancing Day by Rod Argent, Cafe Puccini by Robin Ray, Girlfriends by Howard Goodall and Richard Curtis, Love Songs by Charles Hart, La Bête by David Hirson, Yosopv by Kit Hesketh-Harvey and James McConnel, and Address Unknown by Kathrine Kressman Taylor.
