= Shonagh Daly =

Irish singer and musical performer

Shonagh Daly (born 1980 in Castletroy, Co. Limerick) is an Irish singer and musical performer.

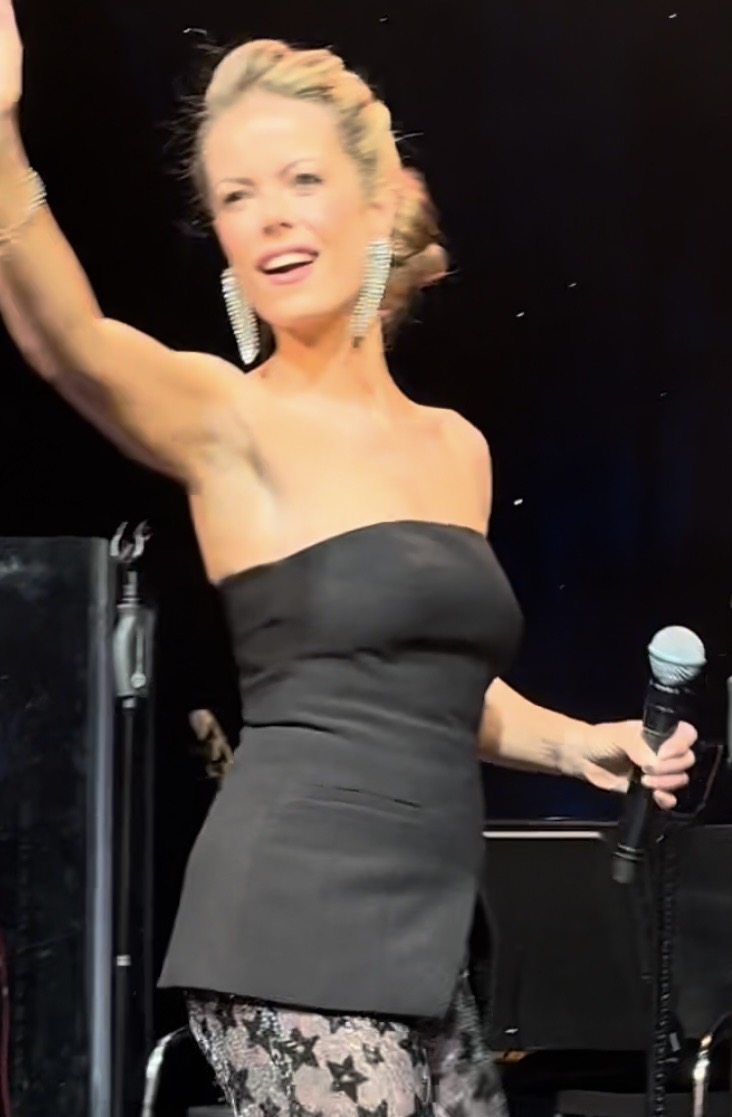
Shonagh Daly Singer

== Performances ==
'Discovered' by Andrew Lloyd Webber, Shonagh sang at the inaugural gala for George W. Bush on 18 January 2001 which was also attended by Tony Blair

She went on to perform at the first Ground Zero memorial concert (at the request of Rudolph Giuliani).

Shonagh sang in November 2003 in London where her audience included the Queen, Prince Philip, the Duke of Edinburgh, Prince Charles, the Prince of Wales, Laura Bush, Colin Powell and Condoleezza Rice.

Following an appearance on The Late Late Show in 2003 in a comedy sketch as Michael Jackson she has since gone on to record an album and appear in a number of West End theatre productions including Les Misérables and The Beautiful Game in both London and Cork.

She also appeared at Andrew Lloyd Webber's Birthday in the Park and sang Buenos Aires from the musical Evita.

During 2024 & 2025 Shonagh performed with Sir Tim Rice tour of “Tim Rice – My Life In Musicals ”Review: TIM RICE: MY LIFE IN MUSICALS, Liverpool Playhouse

== Discography ==
- Beautiful View (Polydor) 2004
