= Cricket (musical) =

Short musical

- (Hearts and Wickets)
- Music: Andrew Lloyd Webber
- Lyrics: Tim Rice
- Book: Tim Rice
- Productions: 1986 Windsor Castle; 1986 Sydmonton Festival; 1986 Lord's Taverners Ball

Cricket, also called Cricket (Hearts and Wickets), is a short musical with music by Andrew Lloyd Webber, and lyrics and book by Tim Rice. It was commissioned for Queen Elizabeth's 60th birthday celebration, and was first performed at Windsor Castle on 18 June 1986.

A lighthearted, tongue-in-cheek show running 30 minutes, the plot is set against the backdrop of the semi-fictional Headingley Cricket Club, whose star player, Donald, is torn between his team and his girlfriend, Emma, as she decides to abandon watching cricket for what appears to be a far more exciting life at the race track with the caddish Vincent.

After its premiere for the Queen, as well as a pair of follow-up performances, the musical was shelved; several tunes were later re-used for the musicals Aspects of Love and Sunset Boulevard. No commercial recording has been made.

Cricket is, to date, the final original musical written by the team of Lloyd Webber and Rice.

== History ==
After their collaboration on Evita in 1978, composer Andrew Lloyd Webber and lyricist Tim Rice took what was originally intended to be a temporary break from their theatrical partnership. They did not work together again until the request for this pièce d'occasion came up, and Cricket ended up being their final original musical.

Prince Edward, the Queen's youngest son, commissioned a short musical from Lloyd Webber and Rice for his mother's 60th birthday celebration. The game of cricket was Tim Rice's favourite pastime – he had a cricket field on the grounds of his home and had his own cricket team – and Rice had a particular passion for this new comic musical about England's national sport. Rice used actual cricket-related names for his characters, boosting the light-hearted feeling of the piece. He and Lloyd Webber created a 30-minute tongue-in-cheek "musicalette" for the Queen.

As with Lloyd Webber and Rice's previous musicals, Cricket is sung-through, with little spoken dialogue.

== Synopsis ==
The show begins during a match of Headingley Cricket Club. The game is watched by the Earl of Headingley, his daughter Emma Kirkstall-Lane, and Vincent St. Leger. The Earl and the cricketers sing the praises of cricket. ("The Summer Game")

Emma intends to marry Headingley player Donald Hobbs. And at the moment, even though he is Emma's father, the Earl is more approving of Donald than of Emma, because he feels his daughter is not supportive enough of Donald's cricketing. Emma loves Donald, but she thinks he neglects her somewhat for his cricket playing, and she wants more time together. She feels that she will be forever secondary in Donald's eyes until he retires from cricket. ("As the Seasons Slip Fruitlessly By")

Vincent, who is devoted to horse races, overhears Emma, and offers his own rather self-interested solution: leaving for the races in lieu of the cricket match. Emma is reluctant at first, but decides that maybe Vincent is right, and runs off with him. ("The Sport of Kings") The opposing team's fast bowler, Winston B. Packer, sings about how wonderful it is to be able to hit batsmen when they miss – and he injures several batsmen during the course of the song. ("The Art of Bowling")

While Donald is batting, he sees Emma leave with Vincent. He's hurt and truly torn – does he stay and bat to help his team win and lose Emma, or does he leave and try to get her back? In the end, sportsmanship prevails: Donald cannot let his team down. But he has been hit a few times during the song, and is suddenly levelled. As he lies dazed on the ground, lines from various people and various moments of the game bombard him – Winston, Emma, Vincent, his team. ("All I Ask of Life")

During the tea interval, Emma returns, dejected, feeling Vincent has deceived her. Not only has she lost all of her money, but she has lost Donald as well. She blames herself, and doesn't see how anyone will ever love her again. ("Fools Like Me")

Donald and the cricketers return to the game after the interval, but Donald ignores Emma. The Earl, however, lets fly at Emma and Vincent. Because of Emma's gambling debts, the Earl has lost his reputation and is in financial distress. Vincent tries to speak, but the Earl turns his attention, and wrath, onto him. The Earl is a powerful member of the Jockey Club, and bans Vincent from all racing events for life. Vincent turns to Emma for sympathy, but she accuses him of deceiving her and getting her into trouble with her father. ("A Ban for Life")

Vincent and Emma's conversation is cut off by a scream. Wittering has been injured and can no longer continue in the game. Headingley CC needs 10 more runs to win, but there is no one to take Wittering's place alongside Donald. The Earl laments the bad day for Headingley. ("Wittering's Final Innings") Vincent suddenly speaks up and says he will take Wittering's place. ("The Making of St. Leger") He joins Donald and the game continues – to the amazement of the cricketers, who believed Vincent had no redeeming qualities. Vincent is beaten up badly during the game, but keeps playing.

Donald's and Vincent's scores win the game and they are both proclaimed heroes. The Earl is so impressed by Vincent's bravery (and recovery of a vital match!) that he withdraws the horse-racing ban. And Donald tells Emma he will play less cricket and spend more time with her. She wonders, could they go to the horse races? Vincent says he will spend Sundays playing cricket. Winston vows to try slow bowling. And to top it all off, Wittering is feeling better. ("The Final Stand")

Donald and Emma finish making up, and vow to stay together with a sweeping love ballad which ends in a crescendo that everyone joins into, proclaiming the triumph of the cricket metaphor for life and love. ("One Hot Afternoon")

== Songs ==
- "The Summer Game" – The Earl, cricketers chorus
- "As the Seasons Slip Fruitlessly By" – Emma
- "The Sport of Kings" – Vincent, Emma
- "The Art of Bowling" – Winston B. Packer
- "All I Ask of Life" – Donald
- "Fools Like Me" – Emma and cricketers
- "A Ban for Life" – the Earl and Vincent; Emma
- "Wittering's Final Innings" – Cricketers, the Earl, Wittering
- "The Making of St. Leger" – Vincent; All
- "The Final Stand" – the Earl and cricketers; All
- "One Hot Afternoon" – Donald and Emma; All

== Productions ==
The show debuted as planned on 18 June 1986 at Windsor Castle, directed by Trevor Nunn and starring Ian Charleson, Sarah Payne, and John Savident. The musicians were members of Colosseum II and others – the ensemble that had first performed Lloyd Webber's Variations. The men's vocal group Cantabile played the cricketers' chorus.

The Windsor Castle performance was very well received. Two more performances followed. One was at Lloyd Webber's Sydmonton Festival on 15 July 1986. The last performance was in November 1986 at Tim Rice's favourite charity, the Lord's Taverners Ball, where Rice played the cricketer Wittering, dressed in his own Heartaches Cricket Club uniform.

A segment of the original rehearsals of Cricket was televised on the Andrew Lloyd Webber instalment of The South Bank Show, which aired on 15 November 1986. The segment featured Sarah Payne and Alvin Stardust rehearsing "As the Seasons Slip Fruitlessly By" and "The Sport of Kings".

There have been no further performances of the musical.

== Original cast ==
- Ian Charleson – Donald Hobbs, devoted cricketer for Headingley Cricket Club
- Sarah Payne – Emma Kirkstall-Lane, Donald's girlfriend
- John Savident – the Earl of Headingley, Emma's father, the solicitous patron of the Headingley Cricket Club, and a Steward of the Jockey Club
- Alvin Stardust – Vincent St. Leger, a caddish fellow who spends his time betting at horse races
- George Harris – Winston B. Packer, a lethal fast bowler originally from the West Indies
- Cantabile – Chorus of cricketers
- HRH Prince Edward – Wittering, the gallant last batsman for Headingley Cricket Club

== After 1986 ==
Lloyd Webber re-used several of Cricket's tunes for commercial projects. The melodies of "All I Ask of Life", "Fools Like Me", and the verses of "As the Seasons Slip Fruitlessly By" were adapted into "Anything but Lonely", "Mermaid Song", and the scene "George's House at Pau" in the 1989 musical Aspects of Love. In addition, "One Hot Afternoon" and the chorus of "As the Seasons Slip Fruitlessly By" eventually became "As If We Never Said Goodbye", and a bridge for "This Time Next Year" in the 1993 musical Sunset Boulevard.

This meant that Cricket, which had been extremely well received, was a dead item and could never be expanded into a full theatrical musical, a fact that greatly distressed Tim Rice.

No commercial recording has been made of the show; an official recording was begun, but then abandoned before completion. A non-commercial demo recording was made in 1986. The Cricket libretto was later published in the 2004 book A Breathless Hush...: The MCC Anthology of Cricket Verse.

The opening number, "The Summer Game", was recorded in 2011 by the men's vocal group Cantabile for their album Songs of Cricket.
