= The Likes of Us =

1965 musical by Tim Rice and Andrew Lloyd Webber

- Original cast recording
- Music: Andrew Lloyd Webber
- Lyrics: Tim Rice
- Book: Leslie Thomas
- Productions: 2005 Sydmonton Festival

The Likes of Us is musical with music by Andrew Lloyd Webber, lyrics by Tim Rice, and a book by Leslie Thomas. It is based on the story of Thomas John Barnardo, a philanthropist who founded homes for destitute children.

== Background ==
Although the musical, the first for both Rice and Lloyd Webber, was composed in 1965, it failed to find backing and was not performed until it was staged at Lloyd Webber's Sydmonton Festival on 9 July 2005.

Amateur rights have since been released. The first amateur company to perform The Likes of Us was Cornish-based youth theatre company Kidz R Us in early 2009.

== Synopsis ==
At the Edinburgh Castle Gin Palace, a drinking establishment in the East End of London, a local girl, who is on very familiar terms with the male clientele, sings of her exploits ("Twice in Love"). The intellectual and driven Barnardo finds himself out of place with the Cockneys of the Edinburgh Castle, and a row among them ensues ("A Very Busy Man"). As a result, Barnardo is thrown out of the tavern, as is Syrie Elmslie, who was attempting to collect money for charity. Outside the tavern, Johnny Farthingay, the son of the landlady, assures his girlfriend Jenny that although he can't buy her expensive presents, their love will keep them together. Jenny is a bit more cynical ("Love Is Here").

Barnardo reflects on the course his life is taking ("A Strange and Lovely Song"). While wandering London's streets, he encounters two homeless children who take him to the rooftops where they live, and it is there Barnardo learns of their struggle to survive ("The Likes of Us"). Barnardo is troubled by the conditions in which the children live. He decides he is needed far more in his own country than in China and resolves to stay in London to help the poor children ("How Am I to Know"). Unfortunately, his efforts to help only serve to stir a sense of outrage in the local populace who feel he is meddling in their affairs ("We'll Get Him").

Undaunted, Barnardo seeks the aid of Lord Shaftesbury. He accepts that his chosen mission will isolate him spiritually from those around him ("A Man on His Own"). Lord Shaftesbury is hosting a party in his home, at which Barnardo's fellow pub evictee Syrie also is a guest. Everyone joins in to sing the praises of England ("Lion-Hearted Land"). Lord Shaftesbury is won over by Barnardo and visits the children with him. Syrie also joins Barnardo's cause, and he is able to set up his first children's home, where he and Syrie care for the children ("You Can Never Make It Alone").

The tide turns, and Barnardo becomes overwrought with financial worries when he is sued for fraud. To make matters worse, a boy he was unable to help dies. Barnardo is in a state of despair, not knowing what will become of him ("Where Am I Going"), and the East End denizens hold an anti-Barnardo demonstration ("Hold a March"). Johnny and Jenny argue about their differing views of Barnardo. Johnny abandons Jenny, and Syrie attempts to console her ("You Won't Care About Him Anymore").

Barnardo's fortunes take a dramatic turn for the better. When the Edinburgh Castle is placed up for auction, he decides to buy it, as his ownership will serve to silence his detractors, and the building can be converted to further his cause ("Going, Going, Gone!"). Barnardo and Syrie marry ("Will This Last Forever?"). Their union provides the spark for two of the children to pretend they too will be a couple ("Man of the World"). The wedding reception is held in Barnardo's new property, which has been converted into a tea and coffee establishment ("Have Another Cup of Tea"). Barnardo and Syrie put the children to bed.

== Principal characters ==
- Barnardo, a medical student who founds the charity known today as Barnardo's
- Syrie, an evangelist who falls in love with Barnardo
- Johnny Farthingay, the son of the Edinburgh Castle's landlady
- Jenny, Johnny's love who eventually becomes Syrie's maid
- Rose, the leader of the London Cockneys, a scarlet girl with a good heart
- Prime Minister, the head of the British government and a loyal supporter of Barnardo's cause
- Auctioneer, overseer of the sale of the Edinburgh Castle
- Narrator

== Musical numbers ==
Act I

- "Overture" – Orchestra
- "Twice in Love Every Day" – Rose and Chorus
- "I'm a Very Busy Man" – Barnardo and Cockneys
- "Love Is Here" – Johnny and Jenny
- "Strange and Lovely Song" – Barnardo
- "The Likes of Us" – Children
- "How Am I To Know" – Barnardo
- "We'll Get Him" – Rose and Chorus
- "This Is My Time" – Syrie
- "Lion-Hearted Land" – Prime Minister and Cabinet
- "We'll Get Him" (reprise) – Rose and Chorus
- "Love Is Here" (reprise) – Johnny and Jenny
- "A Man on His Own" – Barnardo and Chorus

Act II

- "Entr'acte"
- "You Can Never Make It Alone" – Syrie and Children
- "Hold a March" – Rose and Chorus
- "Will This Last Forever?" – Barnardo and Syrie
- "You Won't Care About Him Anymore" – Syrie and Jenny
- "Going, Going, Gone!" – Auctioneer, Barnardo and Crowd
- "Man of the World" – Cockney Children
- "Have Another Cup of Tea" – Full Company
- "Strange and Lovely Song" (reprise) – Barnardo and Syrie
- "The Likes of Us" (reprise) – Children

== Recording ==
In 2005, a special performance to mark 40 years since Lloyd Webber and Rice's collaboration on this show, their first together, was staged at Lloyd Webber's annual Sydmonton Festival, where he tries out new works for a specially-invited audience. Stephen Fry narrated the piece, with Rice as Auctioneer. Hannah Waddingham and Adam Brazier also appeared. The performance was recorded live and released as a double album by Really Useful Records and Polydor.

=== Track listing ===
Disc one

1. "Introduction"
2. "Overture"
3. "Twice in Love Every Day"
4. "I'm a Very Busy Man"
5. "Love Is Here"
6. "Strange and Lovely Song"
7. "The Likes of Us"
8. "How Am I to Know"
9. "We'll Get Him"
10. "This Is My Time"
11. "Lion-Hearted Land"
12. "We'll Get Him (Reprise)"
13. "Love Is Here (Reprise)
14. "A Man on His Own"

Disc two

1. "Entr'acte"
2. "You Can Never Make It Alone"
3. "Hold a March"
4. "Will This Last Forever?"
5. "You Won't Care About Him Anymore"
6. "Going, Going, Gone!"
7. "Man of the World"
8. "Have Another Cup of Tea"
9. "Strange and Lovely Song" (reprise)
10. "The Likes of Us" (reprise)
