= Madeleine Gurdon =

British equestrian (born 1961)

The Right Honourable The Lady Lloyd-Webber
Personal information
- Nationality: British
- Born: Madeleine Astrid Gurdon; 30 November 1961 (age 64)

Sport
- Country: Great Britain
- Sport: Equestrian

Madeleine Astrid Gurdon, Baroness Lloyd-Webber (born 30 November 1962) is an English equestrian. She is married to composer and theatrical impresario Andrew Lloyd Webber.

== Early life ==
Madeleine "Gurtie" Gurdon was born in 1961 into a military family, one of four daughters of Brigadier Adam Brampton Douglas Gurdon, of the Black Watch, and Gillian Margaret, daughter of Charles N. Thomson, of Ethiebeaton, Dundee, Scotland. Her uncle and both grandfathers were also in the Black Watch. Before his marriage, her father served in Korea and later in Kenya during the Mau Mau Uprising; as a married man, he took his family around the world, including Cyprus, Tanganyika, and Hong Kong. He was appointed CB and CBE. Adam Gurdon was grandson of Francis Gurdon, Bishop of Hull from 1913 to 1929, whose wife, Florence, was daughter of Sir John Leigh Hoskyns, 9th Baronet. The Gurdons were landed gentry, of Letton, Norfolk.

Madeleine Gurdon was educated at a convent school.

== Career ==
Madeleine Gurdon was an equestrian competitor for nearly a decade, riding in three-day events, which require the same horse and rider pair to demonstrate skill in dressage, showjumping, and cross-country riding. In the 1980s she competed internationally, coming second at the Burghley Horse Trials in 1988. To supplement her riding career, Gurdon designed an exclusive country-wear company that featured leather and suede clothing called The Done Thing, after her favourite dun horse.

She began to breed and train thoroughbreds for flat racing. She owns and supervises two stud farms: Watership Down Stud near her English home in Sydmonton Court, and Kiltinan Castle stud in Ireland. Dar Re Mi is one of her successful broodmares.

She and her husband set up the Watership Down Polo Club; their children play polo. In 2007 she allowed a group from St Bart's, a local school, to practise there, subsidising their training. The state school team went on to beat fee-paying schools such as Rugby and Cheltenham Ladies College in the Schools and Universities Polo Association Cup. Gurdon then commissioned family friend Emerald Fennell to write a rom-com loosely based on this.

In 2010 she became president of the Pony Club, which she has been involved with all her life. According to Companies House, as of 2021 she has roles in eight companies, including as a director in her husband's Really Useful Group. She is the only woman on the board of Newbury Racecourse.

== Personal life ==
Gurdon married Andrew Lloyd Webber at his Hampshire home, Sydmonton Court, on 9 February 1991. The couple met through his Watership Down neighbours who loved horses.

They have three children together: Alastair (born 1992), William (born 1994) and Isabella (born 1997). The family divides its time between properties in London and Hampshire.
