= Andrew Lloyd Webber =

English theatre composer (born 1948)

The Right Honourable The Lord Lloyd-Webber KG
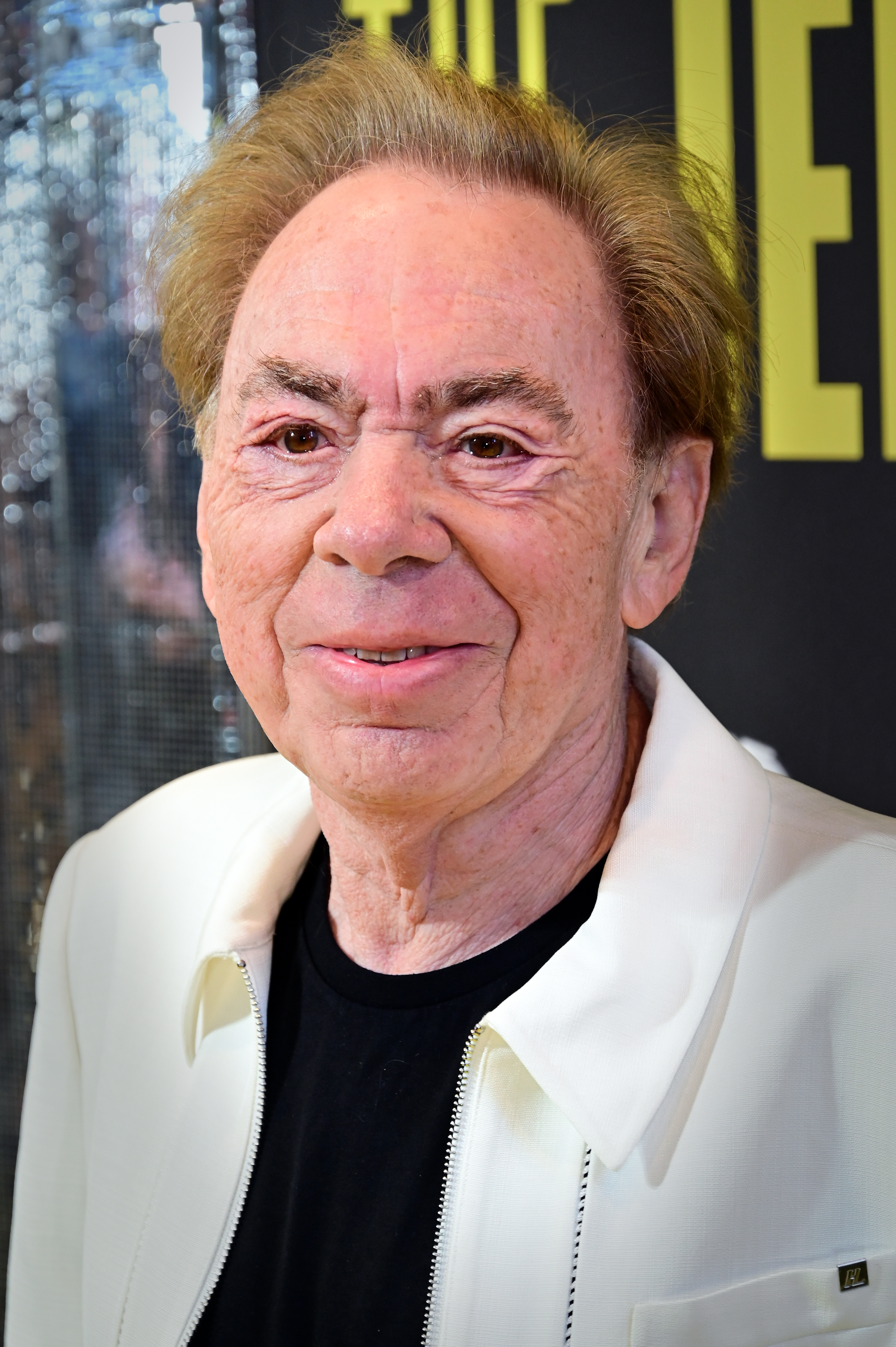
- Lloyd Webber in 2026
- Born: 22 March 1948 (age 78); London, England
- Education: Westminster School; Royal College of Music
- Occupation: Composer
- Years active: 1965–present
- Organisations: LW Entertainment; Andrew Lloyd Webber Foundation
- Notable work: Joseph and the Amazing Technicolor Dreamcoat (1968); Jesus Christ Superstar (1970); Evita (1976); Cats (1981); Starlight Express (1984); The Phantom of the Opera (1986); Sunset Boulevard (1993); School of Rock (2015)
- Spouses: Sarah Hugill (m. 1971; div. 1983) Sarah Brightman (m. 1984; div. 1990) Madeleine Gurdon (m. 1991)
- Children: 5, including Imogen and Nick
- Father: William Lloyd Webber
- Relatives: Julian Lloyd Webber (brother)
- Awards: Full list

Member of the House of Lords
- Lord Temporal
- Life peerage 18 February 1997 – 17 October 2017
- Website: www.andrewlloydwebber.com

Andrew Lloyd Webber, Baron Lloyd-Webber (born 22 March 1948) is an English composer and impresario of musical theatre. Several of his musicals have run for more than a decade both in the West End and on Broadway. He has composed 21 musicals, a song cycle, a set of variations, two film scores, and a Latin Requiem Mass.

Several of Lloyd Webber's songs have been widely recorded and widely successful outside their parent musicals, such as "Memory" from Cats, "The Music of the Night" and "All I Ask of You" from The Phantom of the Opera, "I Don't Know How to Love Him" from Jesus Christ Superstar, "Don't Cry for Me Argentina" from Evita, and "Any Dream Will Do" from Joseph and the Amazing Technicolor Dreamcoat. In 2001, The New York Times referred to him as "the most commercially successful composer in history". The Daily Telegraph named him in 2008 the fifth-most powerful person in British culture, on which occasion lyricist Don Black said that "Andrew more or less single-handedly reinvented the musical."

Lloyd Webber has received numerous awards, including a knighthood in 1992, followed by a peerage for services to the arts, seven Tony Awards, seven Laurence Olivier Awards, three Grammy Awards (as well as the Grammy Legend Award), an Academy Award, 14 Ivor Novello Awards, a Golden Globe Award, a Brit Award, the 2006 Kennedy Center Honors, and two Classic Brit Awards (for Outstanding Contribution to Music in 2008, and for Musical Theatre and Education in 2018). In 2018, after Jesus Christ Superstar Live in Concert won the Primetime Emmy Award for Outstanding Variety Special (Live), he became the thirteenth person to win an Oscar, an Emmy, a Grammy, and a Tony. He has a star on the Hollywood Walk of Fame, is an inductee into the Songwriters Hall of Fame, and is a fellow of the British Academy of Songwriters, Composers, and Authors.

LW Entertainment (formerly The Really Useful Group), Lloyd Webber's company, is one of the largest theatre operators in London. Producers in several parts of the UK have staged productions, including national tours, of Lloyd Webber musicals under licence from LW Entertainment. He is also the president of the Arts Educational Schools, London, a performing arts school located in Chiswick, west London. Lloyd Webber is involved in a number of charitable activities, including the Elton John AIDS Foundation, Nordoff Robbins, Prostate Cancer UK and War Child. In 1992, he started the Andrew Lloyd Webber Foundation, which supports the arts, culture, and heritage of the UK.

== Early life ==
Lloyd Webber was born on 22 March 1948, at Westminster Hospital in London, the elder son of William Lloyd Webber (1914–1982), a composer and organist, and Jean Hermione Johnstone (1921–1993), a violinist and pianist. His younger brother, Julian Lloyd Webber, is a world-renowned solo cellist. On the BBC's genealogy series Who Do You Think You Are?, he learned that his mother's great-great-uncle was the soldier Sir Peregrine Maitland who in 1815 served as a major general at the Battle of Waterloo.

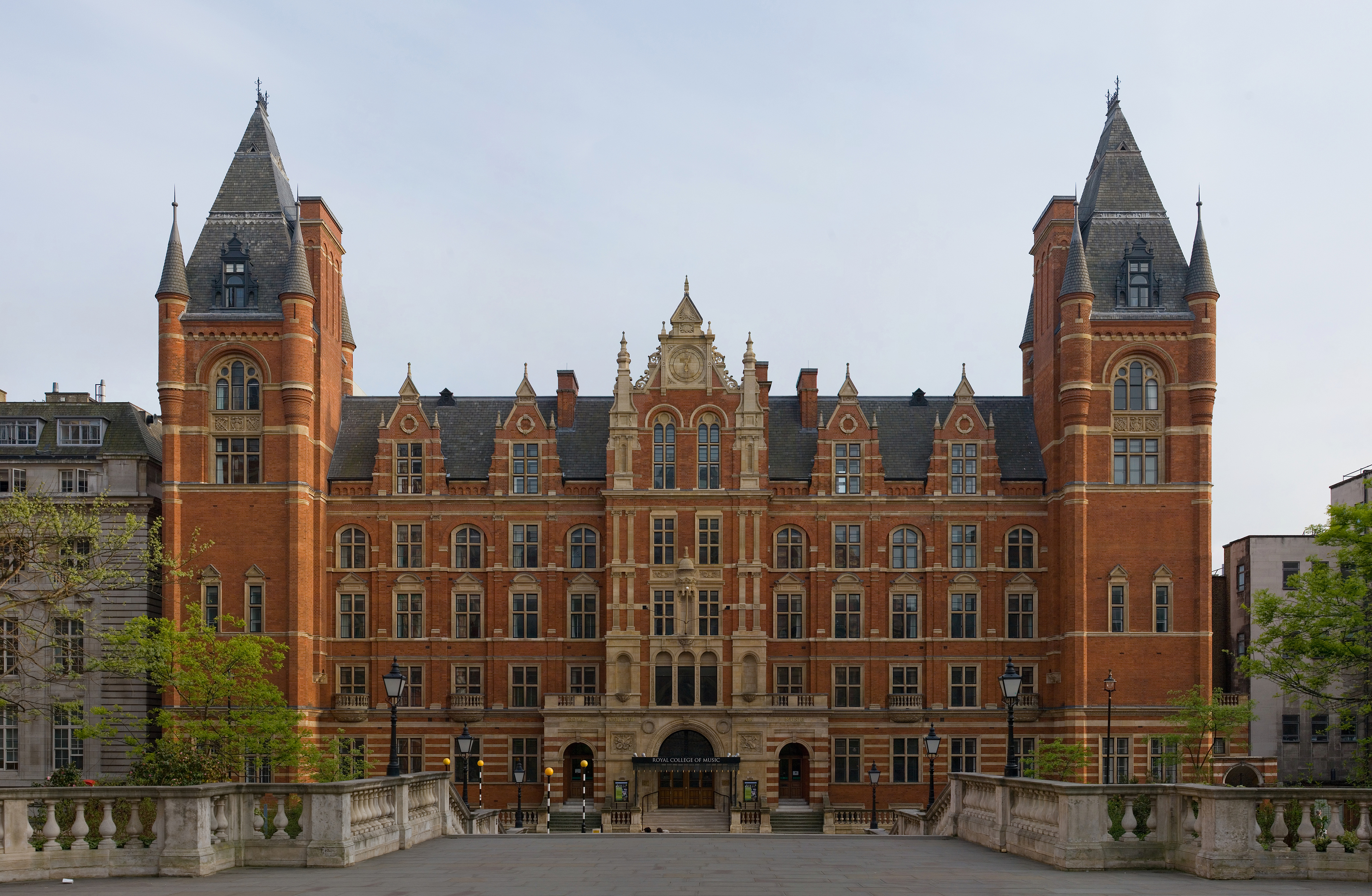
Lloyd Webber studied at the Royal College of Music in London as did his father William. In 2014, he received an honorary doctorate from the college for his "contribution to musical life".

Fascinated by music from an early age, Andrew started playing the piano and violin at the age of three, before taking up the French horn and started composing his own music by the age of six, writing a suite of six pieces when he was nine. He also put on "productions" with Julian and his aunt Viola in his toy theatre (which he built at Viola's suggestion). In his memoir, he writes: "mum was determined that I should be a prodigy in something or other." His aunt Viola, an actress, took him to see many of her shows and through the stage door into the world of the theatre. His father enrolled him as a part-time student at the Eric Gilder School of Music in 1963. At this time he was working on a Genghis Khan musical called Westonia!.

From 1960 to 1965, Lloyd Webber was a Queen's Scholar at Westminster School. An avid listener of 1960s rock and pop music, he called The Rolling Stones song "(I Can't Get No) Satisfaction" the "best record of the Sixties", and Dusty Springfield's rendition of "Son of a Preacher Man" the song that taught him "the power of a perfect pop song". He studied history for a term at Magdalen College, Oxford, although he abandoned the course in the winter of 1965 to study at the Royal College of Music in London and pursue his interest in musical theatre.

== Career ==
=== Early years ===
"The names of Andrew Lloyd Webber and Tim Rice are, of course, forever bound together in musical theatre history, like those of Gilbert and Sullivan."

— Theatre critic Mark Shenton on the partnership of Lloyd Webber and Rice.

In 1965, when Lloyd Webber was a 17-year-old budding musical-theatre composer, he was introduced to the 20-year-old aspiring pop-song writer Tim Rice. Their first collaboration was The Likes of Us, an Oliver!-inspired musical based on the true story of Thomas John Barnardo. They produced a demo tape of that work in 1966, but the project failed to gain a backer.

Although composed in 1965, The Likes of Us was not publicly performed until 2005, when a production was staged at Lloyd Webber's Sydmonton Festival. In 2008, amateur rights were released by the National Operatic and Dramatic Association (NODA) in association with the Really Useful Group. The first amateur performance was by a children's theatre group in Cornwall called "Kidz R Us". Stylistically, The Likes of Us is fashioned after the Broadway musical of the 1940s and 1950s; it opens with a traditional overture comprising a medley of tunes from the show, and the score reflects some of Lloyd Webber's early influences, particularly Richard Rodgers, Frederick Loewe, and Lionel Bart. In this respect, it is markedly different from his later work, which tends to be either predominantly or wholly through-composed, and closer in form to opera.

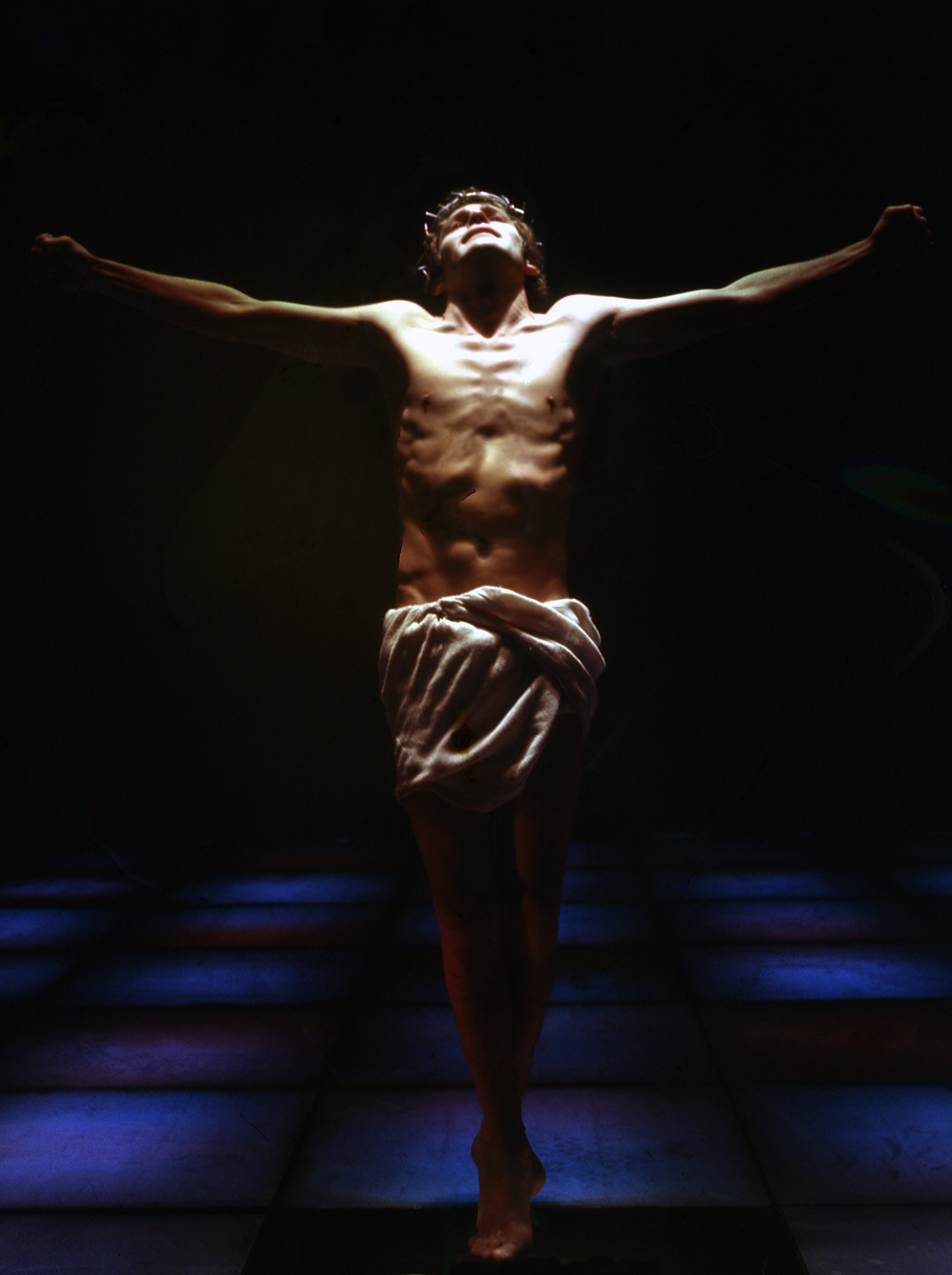
Jesus Christ Superstar, starring Paul Nicholas, at the Palace Theatre, London in 1972. Its success saw Lloyd Webber and Tim Rice expand and release their previous biblical-based musical Joseph.

In the summer of 1967, Alan Doggett, a family friend of the Lloyd Webbers who had assisted on The Likes of Us and who was the music teacher at the Colet Court school in London, commissioned Lloyd Webber and Rice to write a piece for the school's choir. Doggett requested a "pop cantata" along the lines of Herbert Chappell's The Daniel Jazz (1963) and Michael Hurd's Jonah-Man Jazz (1966), both of which had been published by Novello and were based on the Old Testament. The request for the new piece came with a 100-guinea advance from Novello. This resulted in Joseph and the Amazing Technicolor Dreamcoat, a retelling of the biblical story of Joseph, in which Lloyd Webber and Rice humorously pastiched a number of pop-music styles such as Elvis-style rock'n'roll, Calypso and country music. Joseph began life as a short cantata that gained some recognition on its second staging with a favourable review in The Times. By its third performance, at St Paul's Cathedral in November 1968, the musical had been expanded to 35 minutes. For its subsequent performances, Rice and Lloyd Webber revised the show and added new songs to expand it to a more substantial length. Continued expansion culminated in a 1972 stage musical and then a two-hour-long production of Joseph being staged in the West End in 1973 on the back of the success of Jesus Christ Superstar. By 2008 more than 20,000 productions of Joseph had been staged by schools and amateur theatre groups.

In 1969, Rice and Lloyd Webber wrote a song for the Eurovision Song Contest called "Try It and See", which was not selected. With rewritten lyrics, it became "King Herod's Song" in their third musical, Jesus Christ Superstar (1970). Debuting on Broadway in 1971, by 1980 the musical had grossed more than $237 million worldwide. Running for over eight years in London between 1972 and 1980, it held the record for longest-running West End musical before it was overtaken by Cats in 1989. The planned follow-up to Jesus Christ Superstar was a musical comedy based on the Jeeves and Wooster novels by P. G. Wodehouse. Tim Rice was uncertain about this venture, partly because of his concern that he might not be able to do justice to the novels that he and Lloyd Webber so admired. Rice backed out of the project and Lloyd Webber subsequently wrote the musical Jeeves with Alan Ayckbourn, who provided the book and lyrics. Jeeves failed to make any impact at the box office and closed after a run of only 38 performances in the West End in 1975. Many years later, Lloyd Webber and Ayckbourn revisited this project, producing a thoroughly reworked and more successful version titled By Jeeves (1996).

=== Mid-1970s ===
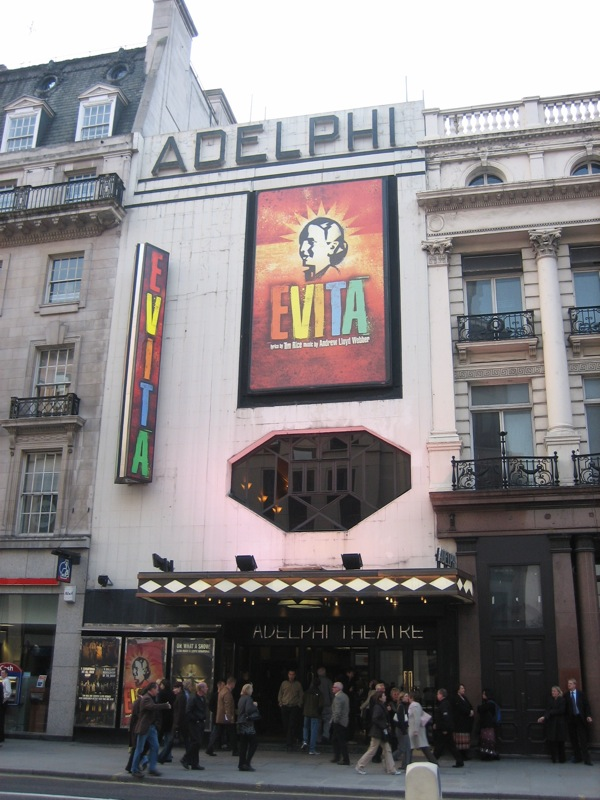
Evita at the West End's Adelphi Theatre. Lloyd Webber purchased the theatre in 1993.

Lloyd Webber collaborated with Rice once again to write Evita (1978), a musical based on the life of Eva Perón. As with Jesus Christ Superstar, Evita was released first as a concept album (1976) featuring Julie Covington singing the part of Eva Perón. The song "Don't Cry for Me Argentina" became a hit single and the musical was staged at the West End's Prince Edward Theatre in a production directed by Harold Prince and starring Elaine Paige in the title role. This original production was enormously successful, running for nearly eight years in the West End.

Evita transferred to Broadway in 1979, in a production starring Patti LuPone as Eva and Mandy Patinkin as Che; it won seven Tony Awards, including Best Musical, helped launch the careers of both LuPone and Patinkin, and ran for almost four years. Rice and Lloyd Webber parted ways soon after Evita, although they have sporadically worked together since then.

In 1978, Lloyd Webber embarked on a project with his cellist brother Julian, the Variations, based on the 24th Caprice by Paganini; this reached number two in the pop album chart in the UK. The main theme was used as the theme tune for ITV's long-running South Bank Show throughout its 32-year run. The same year, Lloyd Webber also composed a new theme tune for the long-running documentary series Whicker's World, which was used from 1978 to 1980. He also composed the instrumental "Argentine Melody" as the theme music for the BBC's coverage of the 1978 FIFA World Cup held in Argentina.

=== 1980s ===
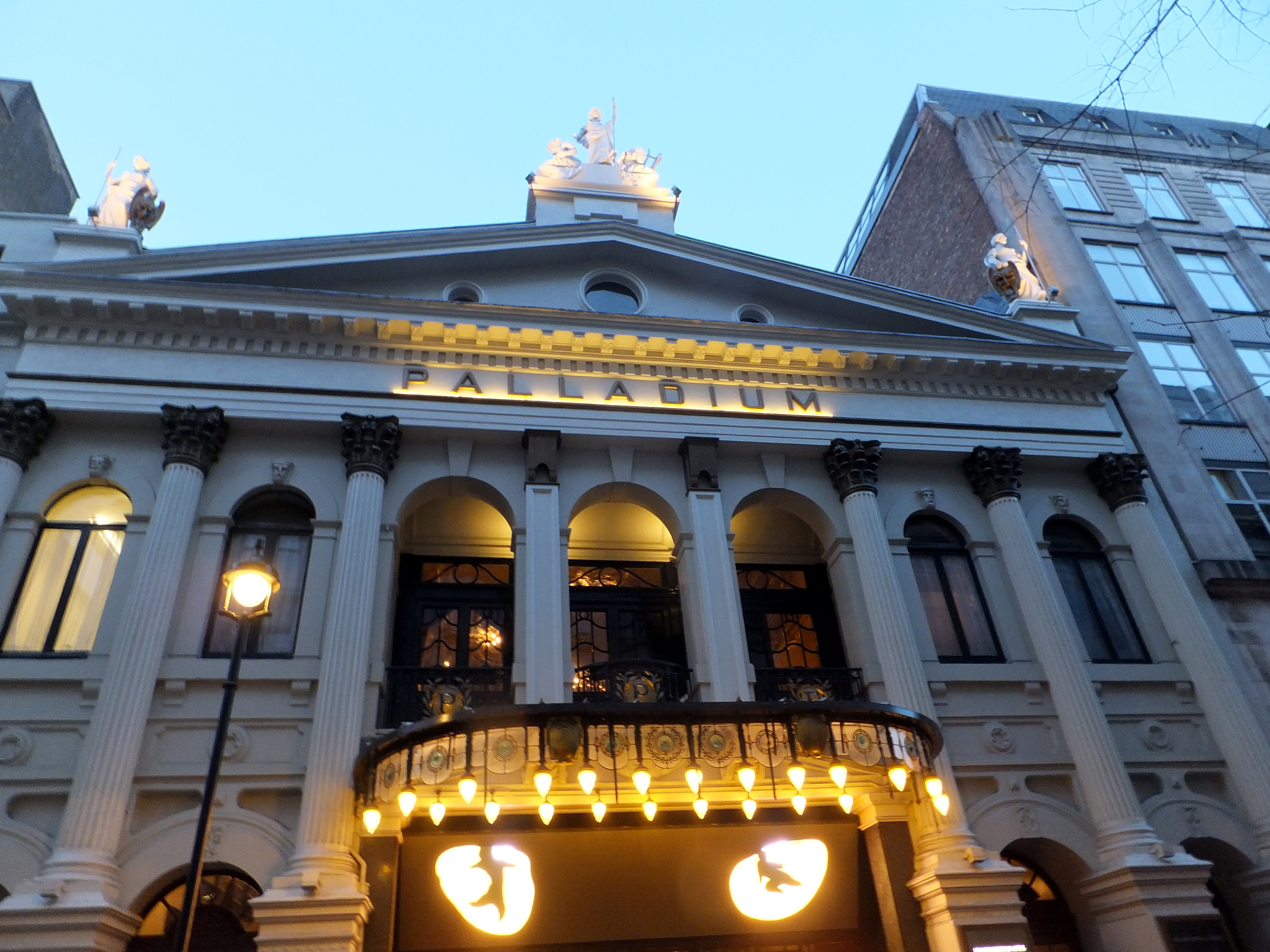
Cats at the London Palladium

Lloyd Webber was the subject of This Is Your Life in November 1980 when he was surprised by Eamonn Andrews in the foyer of Thames Television's Euston Road Studios in London. He would be honoured a second time by the television programme in November 1994 when Michael Aspel surprised him at the West End's Adelphi Theatre.

Lloyd Webber embarked on his next project without a lyricist, turning instead to the poetry of T. S. Eliot. Producer Cameron Mackintosh recruited director Trevor Nunn and choreographer Gillian Lynne to turn the songs into a complete musical. Opened to positive reviews at the New London Theatre in the West End in 1981, Cats was to become the longest-running musical in London, where it ran for 21 years and 8,949 performances before closing. Michael Billington of The Guardian lauded Cats as "an exhilarating piece of total theatre", praising Lloyd Webber's fitting compositions, Lynne's effective and at times brilliant choreography, and Nunn's "dazzling staging". On Broadway, Cats ran for 18 years, a record which would ultimately be broken by another Lloyd Webber musical, The Phantom of the Opera. It won numerous awards including Best Musical at both the Laurence Olivier and Tony Awards. Elaine Paige collaborated again with Lloyd Webber, originating the role of Grizabella in Cats, and had a Top 10 UK hit with "Memory".

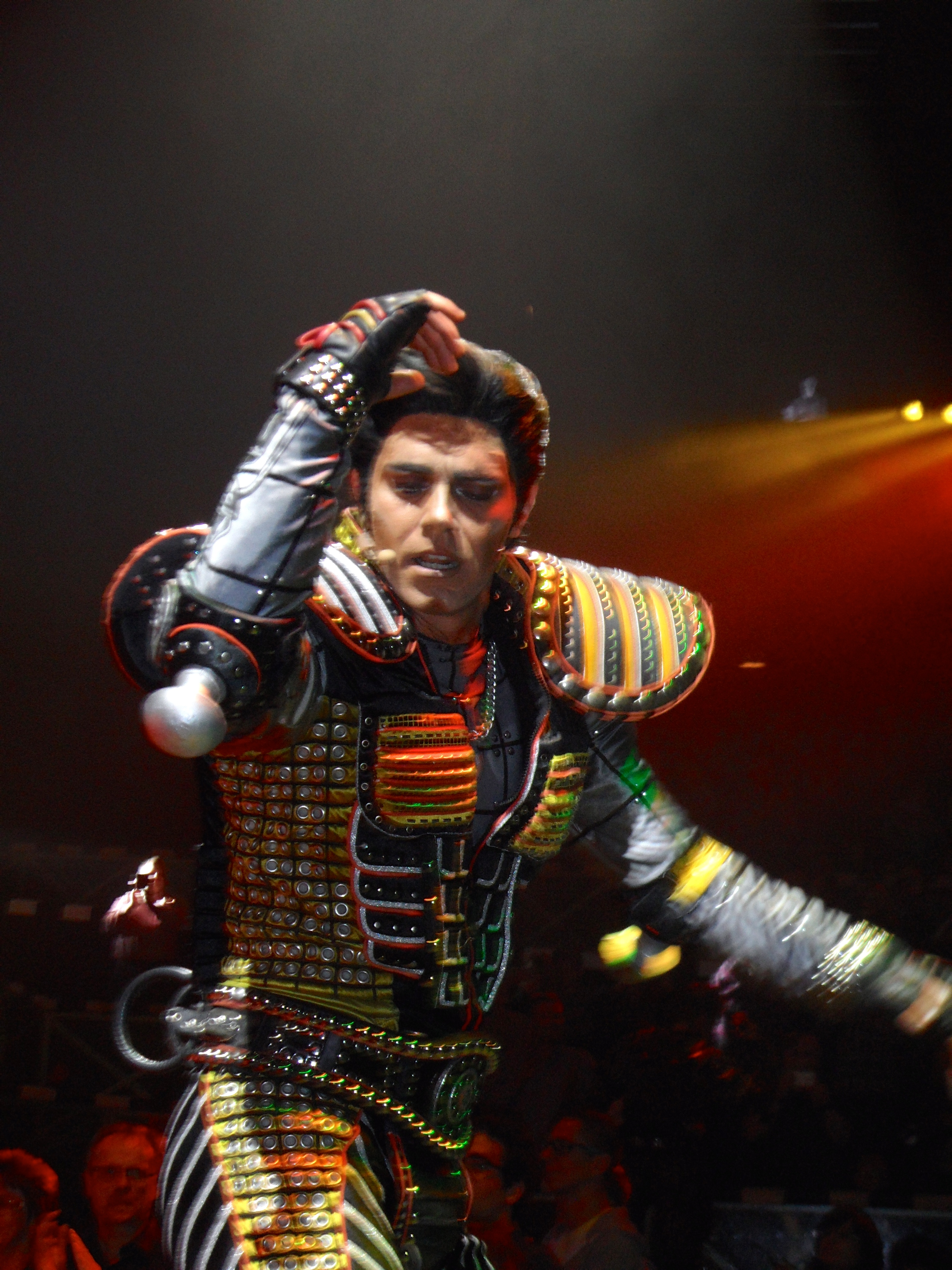
Starlight Express has been running in Bochum, Germany, since 1988.

Lloyd Webber's next musical, Starlight Express (1984), with lyrics provided by Richard Stilgoe, was a commercial hit, but received negative reviews from the critics. It ran for 7,409 performances in London, making it the ninth longest-running West End show. It ran for less than two years on Broadway. The show has also seen two tours of the US, as well as an Australian/Japanese production, a three-year UK touring production, which transferred to New Zealand later in 2009. Starlight Express runs full-time in a custom-built theatre in Bochum, Germany, where it has been running since 1988. The German production holds the Guinness World Record for most visitors to a musical in a single theatre.

Lloyd Webber wrote a Requiem Mass dedicated to his father, William, who had died in 1982. It premiered at St. Thomas Church in New York on 24 February 1985. Church music had been a part of the composer's upbringing and the composition was inspired by an article he had read about the plight of Cambodian orphans. Lloyd Webber had on a number of occasions written sacred music for the annual Sydmonton Festival. Lloyd Webber received a Grammy Award in 1986 for Requiem in the category of best classical composition. Pie Jesu from Requiem achieved a high placing on the UK Singles Chart and was certified silver. Perhaps because of its large orchestration, live performances of the Requiem are rare.

In 1986, Prince Edward, the youngest son of Queen Elizabeth II, commissioned a short musical from Lloyd Webber and Rice for his mother's 60th birthday celebration. Cricket (1986), also called Cricket (Hearts and Wickets), reunited Lloyd Webber with Rice to create this short musical for the Queen's birthday, first performed at Windsor Castle. Several of the tunes were later used for Aspects of Love and Sunset Boulevard.

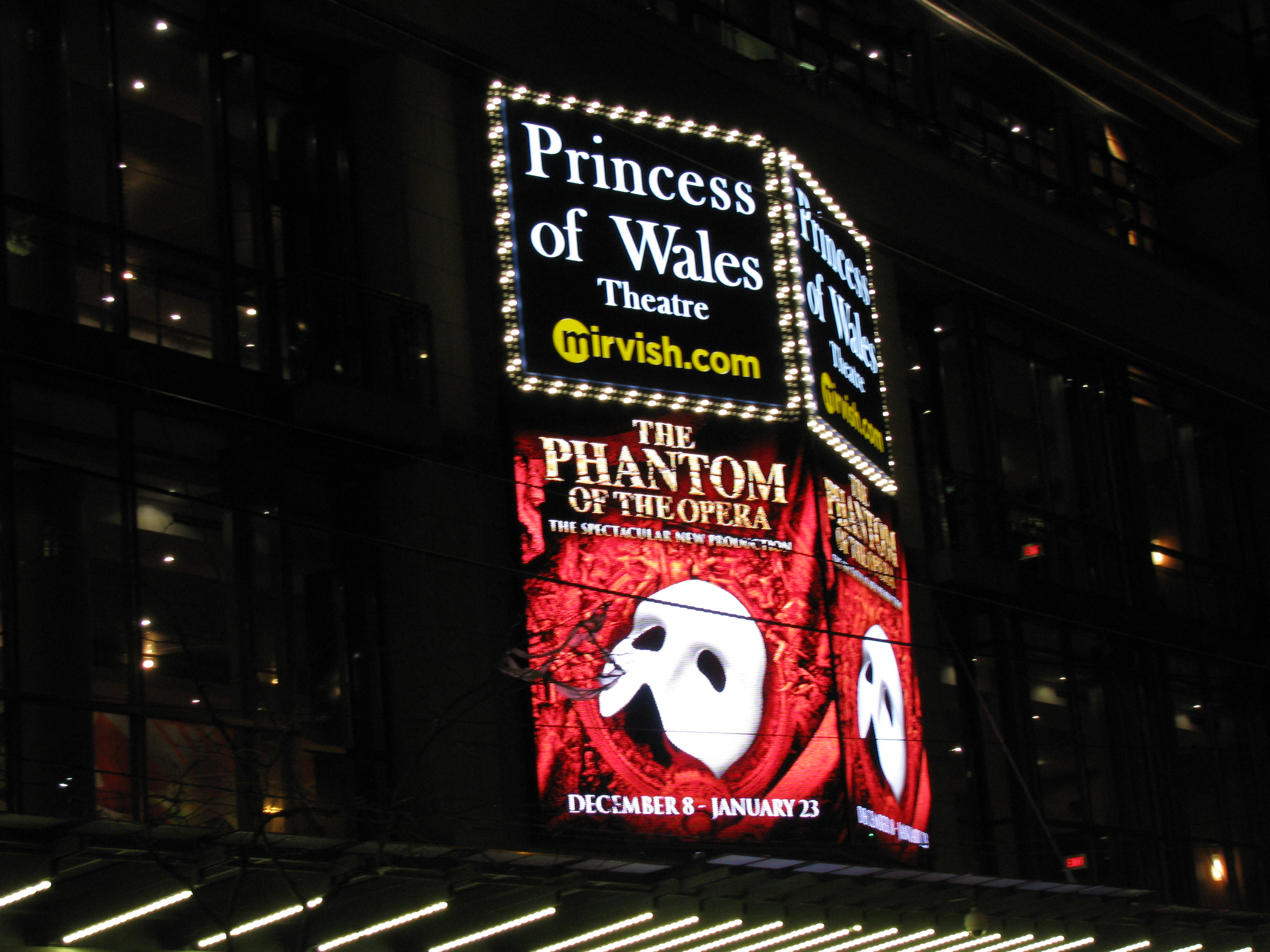
The Phantom of the Opera at the Princess of Wales Theatre, Toronto

Lloyd Webber premiered The Phantom of the Opera at Her Majesty's Theatre in the West End in 1986, inspired by the 1911 Gaston Leroux novel. He wrote the part of Christine for his then wife, Sarah Brightman, who played the role in the original London and Broadway productions alongside Michael Crawford as the Phantom. The production was directed by Harold Prince, who had also earlier directed Evita. Charles Hart wrote the lyrics for Phantom with some additional material provided by Richard Stilgoe, with whom Lloyd Webber co-wrote the book of the musical. It became a hit and is still running in the West End; with over 16,000 London productions it is the second longest-running West End musical. In January 2006 it overtook Lloyd Webber's Cats as the longest-running show on Broadway. On 11 February 2012, Phantom of the Opera played its 10,000th show on Broadway, and on 16 April 2023, the production closed having played 13,981 performances, the most in Broadway history.

Aspects of Love followed in 1989, a musical based on the story by David Garnett. The lyrics were by Don Black and Charles Hart and the original production was directed by Trevor Nunn. Aspects had a run of four years in London, but closed after less than a year on Broadway. It has since gone on a tour of the UK. It is famous for the song "Love Changes Everything", which was performed by Michael Ball in both the West End and Broadway casts. It stayed in the UK Singles Chart for 14 weeks, peaking at number 2 and becoming Ball's signature tune.

=== 1990s ===
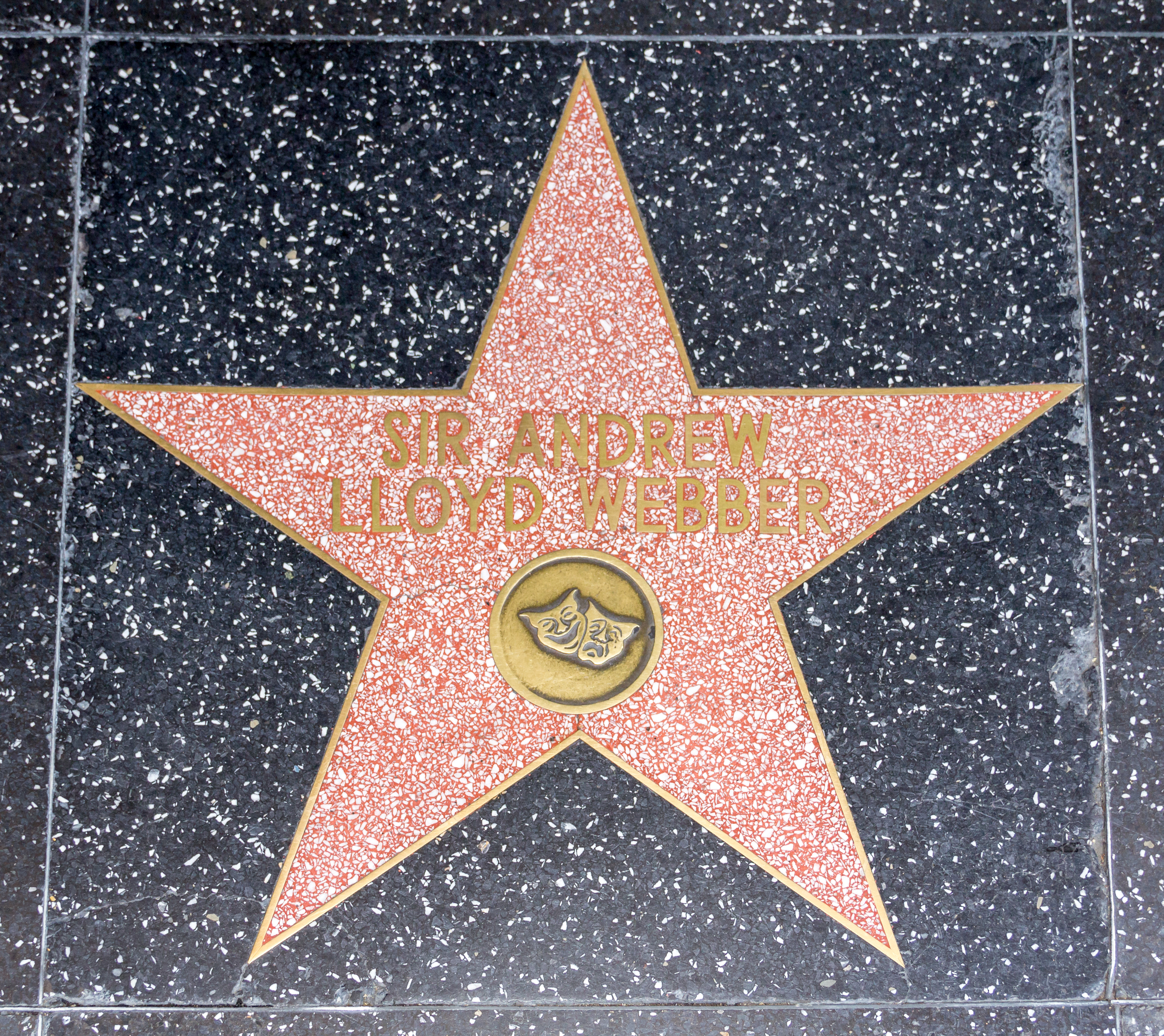
Lloyd Webber was awarded a star on the Hollywood Walk of Fame in 1993 for his contribution to live theatre.

Lloyd Webber was asked to write a song for the 1992 Summer Olympics in Barcelona and he composed "Amigos Para Siempre – Friends for Life" with Don Black providing the lyrics. This song was performed by Sarah Brightman and José Carreras.

Lloyd Webber had toyed with the idea of writing a musical based on Billy Wilder's critically acclaimed movie, Sunset Boulevard, since seeing the film in the early 1970s, but the project did not come to fruition until after the completion of Aspects of Love when the composer finally managed to secure the rights from Paramount Pictures, The composer worked with two collaborators, as he had done on Aspects of Love; this time Christopher Hampton and Don Black shared equal credit for the book and lyrics. Sunset Boulevard opened at the Adelphi Theatre in London on 12 July 1993, and ran for 1,529 performances.

In 1994, Sunset Boulevard became a successful Broadway show, opening with the largest advance in Broadway history, and winning seven Tony Awards that year. Even so, by its closing in 1997, "it had not recouped its reported $13 million investment." From 1995 to 2000, Lloyd Webber wrote the Matters of Taste column in The Daily Telegraph where he reviewed restaurants and hotels, and these were illustrated by Lucinda Rogers.

In 1998, Lloyd Webber released a film version of Cats, which was filmed at the Adelphi Theatre in London. David Mallet directed the film, and Gillian Lynne choreographed it. The cast consisted of performers who had been in the show before, including Ken Page (the original Old Deuteronomy on Broadway), Elaine Paige (original Grizabella in London) and John Mills as Gus: the Theatre Cat.

In 1998, Whistle Down the Wind made its debut, a musical written with lyrics supplied by Jim Steinman. Originally opening in Washington, Lloyd Webber was reportedly not happy with the casting or Harold Prince's production and the show was subsequently revised for a London staging directed by Gale Edwards. The production included the Boyzone number-one hit "No Matter What", which remained at the top of the UK charts for three weeks. His The Beautiful Game opened in London and has never been seen on Broadway. The show had a respectable run at The Cambridge Theatre in London. The show was re-worked into a new musical, The Boys in the Photograph, which had its world première at the Liverpool Institute for Performing Arts in April 2008.

=== 2000s ===
Having achieved great popular success in musical theatre, Lloyd Webber was referred to by The New York Times in 2001 as "the most commercially successful composer in history". In 2002 he turned producer, bringing the musical Bombay Dreams to London. With music by Indian music composer A. R. Rahman and lyrics by Don Black, it ran for two years at the Apollo Victoria Theatre. A revised Broadway production at the Broadway Theatre two years later ran for only 284 performances. On 16 September 2004, his production of The Woman in White opened at the Palace Theatre in London. It ran for 19 months and 500 performances. A revised production opened on Broadway at the Marquis Theatre on 17 November 2005. Garnering mixed reviews from critics, due in part to the frequent absences of the show's star Maria Friedman due to breast cancer treatment, it closed only a brief three months later on 19 February 2006.

Lloyd Webber produced a staging of The Sound of Music, which débuted in November 2006. He made the controversial decision to choose an unknown to play leading lady Maria, who was found through the BBC's reality television show How Do You Solve a Problem like Maria?, in which he was a judge. The winner of the show was Connie Fisher. A 2006 project, The Master and Margarita, was abandoned in 2007.

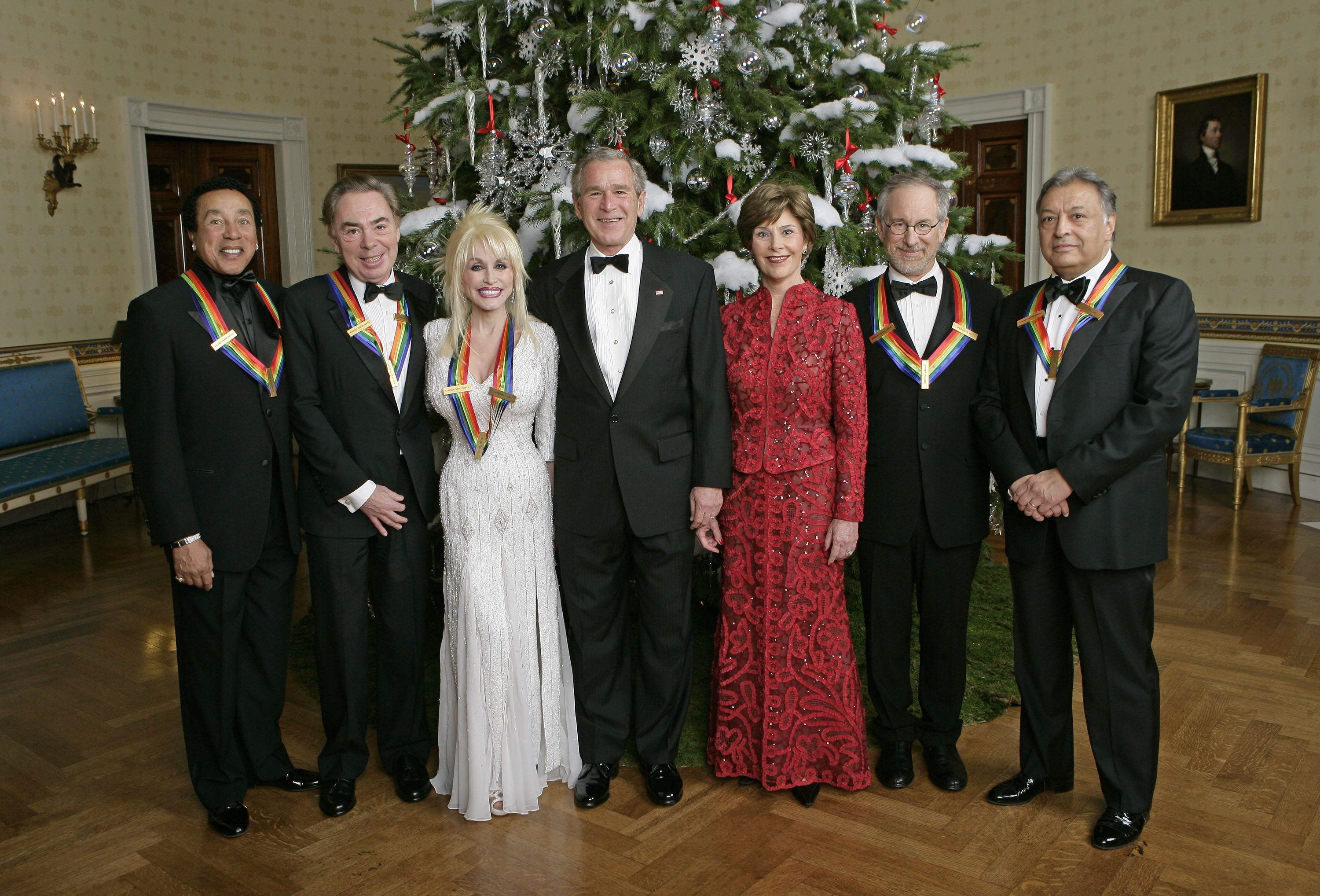
U.S. President George W. Bush and First Lady Laura Bush stand with the Kennedy Center honourees in the Blue Room of the White House during a reception Sunday, 3 December 2006. From left, they are: singer and songwriter William "Smokey" Robinson; Lloyd Webber; country singer Dolly Parton; film director Steven Spielberg; and conductor Zubin Mehta.

In September 2006, Lloyd Webber was named a recipient of the Kennedy Center Honors with Zubin Mehta, Dolly Parton, Steven Spielberg, and Smokey Robinson. He was recognised for his outstanding contribution to American performing arts. On 11 February 2007, Lloyd Webber was featured as a guest judge on the reality television show Grease: You're the One That I Want!.

Between April and June 2007, he appeared in BBC One's Any Dream Will Do!, which followed the same format as How Do You Solve a Problem Like Maria?. Its aim was to find a new Joseph for his revival of Joseph and the Amazing Technicolor Dreamcoat. Lee Mead won the contest. Viewers' telephone voting during the series raised more than £500,000 for the BBC's annual Children in Need charity appeal, according to host Graham Norton on air during the final.

In 2007, Lloyd Webber's cat, Otto, leaped onto his Clavinova piano and "destroyed the entire score for the new 'Phantom' in one fell swoop". The Phantom in question was The Phantom of Manhattan, a planned sequel to The Phantom of the Opera. On 1 July 2007, Lloyd Webber presented excerpts from his musicals as part of the Concert for Diana held at Wembley Stadium, London, an event organised to celebrate the life of Diana, Princess of Wales almost 10 years after her death. BBC Radio 2 broadcast a concert of music from the Lloyd Webber musicals on 24 August 2007. Denise van Outen introduced songs from Whistle Down the Wind, The Beautiful Game, Tell Me on a Sunday, The Woman in White, Evita and Joseph and the Amazing Technicolor Dreamcoat – as well as Rodgers and Hammerstein's The Sound of Music, which Lloyd Webber revived in 2006 at the London Palladium, and the 2002 musical Bombay Dreams.

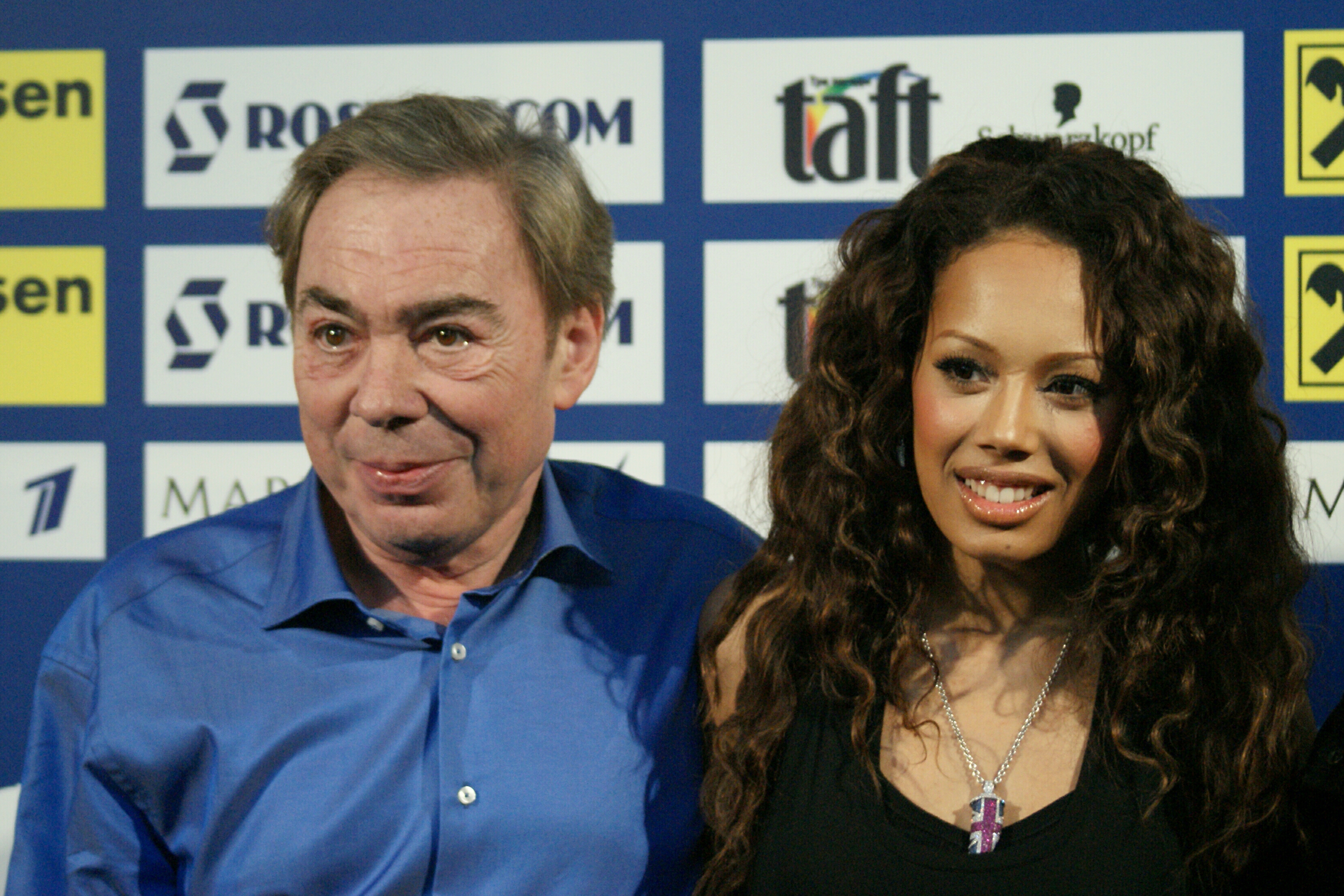
Lloyd Webber and the UK's 2009 Eurovision entrant Jade Ewen

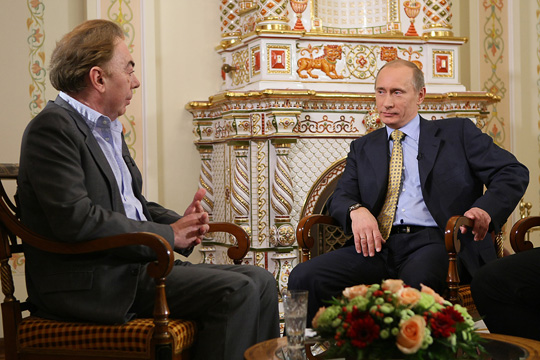
Lloyd Webber and Russian President Vladimir Putin prior to the 2009 Eurovision Song Contest in Moscow

In April 2008, Lloyd Webber reprised his role as judge, this time in the BBC musical talent show I'd Do Anything. The show followed a similar format to its Maria and Joseph predecessors, this time involving a search for an actress to play the role of Nancy in a West End production of Lionel Bart's Oliver!, a musical based on the Charles Dickens' novel Oliver Twist. The show also featured a search for three young actors to play and share the title character's role, but the show's main focus was on the search for Nancy. The role was won by Jodie Prenger despite Lloyd Webber's stated preference for one of the other contestants; the winners of the Oliver role were Harry Stott, Gwion Wyn-Jones and Laurence Jeffcoate. Also in April 2008, Lloyd Webber was featured on the U.S. talent show American Idol, acting as a mentor when the 6 finalists had to select one of his songs to perform for the judges that week.

Lloyd Webber managed the UK's entry for the 2009 Eurovision Song Contest, to be held in Moscow. In early 2009 a series, called Eurovision: Your Country Needs You, was broadcast to find a performer for a song that he would compose for the competition. Jade Ewen won the right to represent Britain, winning with "It's My Time", by Lloyd Webber and Diane Warren. At the contest, Lloyd Webber accompanied her on the piano during the performance. The United Kingdom finished fifth in the contest.

On 8 October 2009, Lloyd Webber launched the musical Love Never Dies at a press conference held at Her Majesty's Theatre, where the original Phantom has been running since 1986. Also present were Sierra Boggess, who had been cast as Christine Daaé, and Ramin Karimloo, who portrayed Phantom, a role he had recently played in the West End.

=== 2010s ===
Following the opening of Love Never Dies, Lloyd Webber again began a search for a new musical theatre performer in the BBC One series Over the Rainbow. He cast the winner, Danielle Hope, in the role of Dorothy Gale, and a dog to play Toto in his forthcoming stage production of The Wizard of Oz. He and lyricist and composer Tim Rice wrote a number of new songs for the production to supplement the songs from the film.

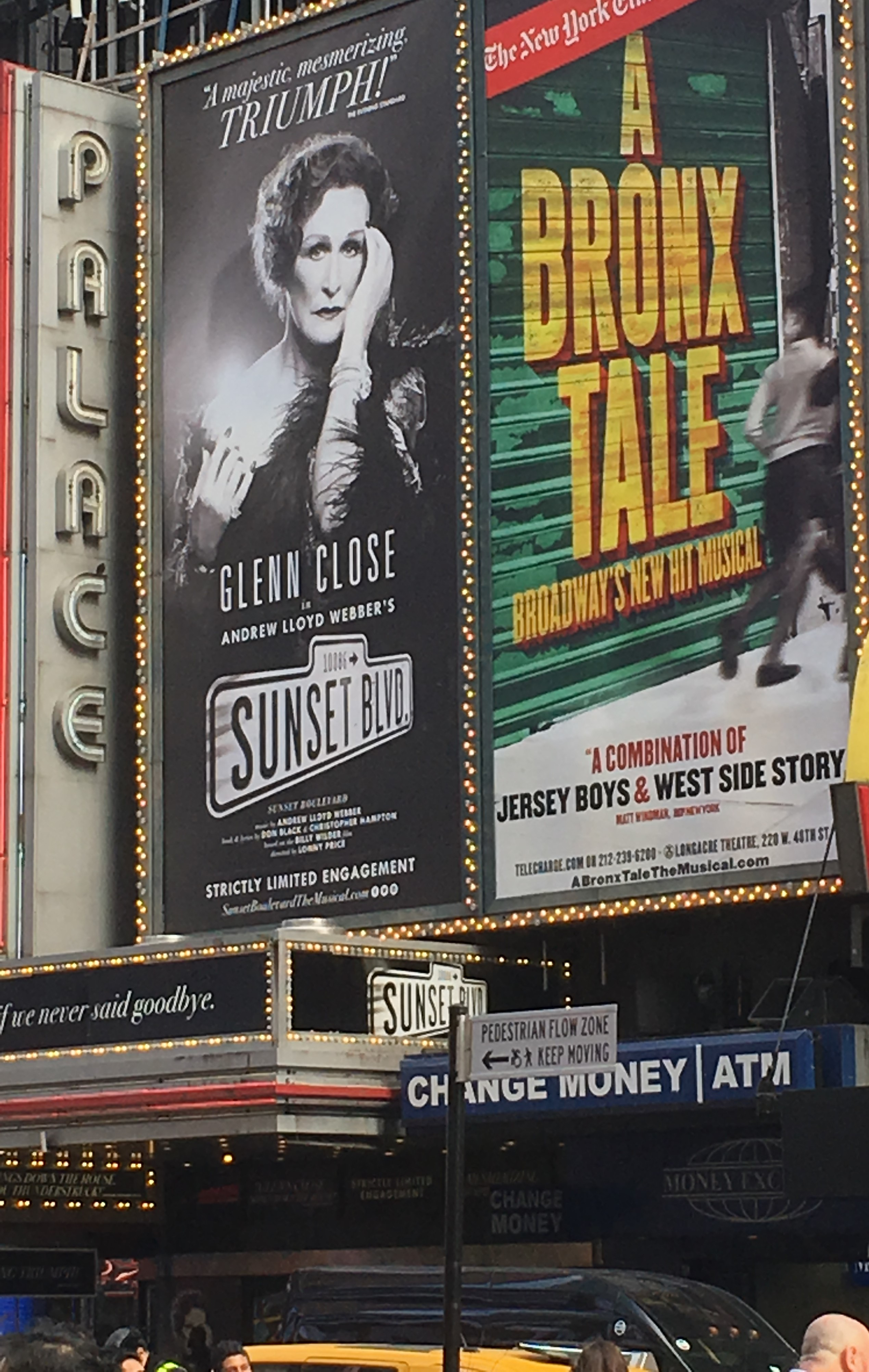
After the 2016 English National Opera's revival of Lloyd Webber's 1990s musical Sunset Boulevard at the London Coliseum was well-received, in 2017 the production transferred to the Palace Theatre on Broadway (pictured).

On 1 March 2011, The Wizard of Oz opened at The Palladium Theatre, starring Hope as Dorothy Gale and Michael Crawford as the Wizard of Oz. In 2012, Lloyd Webber fronted a new ITV primetime show Superstar which gave the UK public the chance to decide who would play the starring role of Jesus in an arena tour of Jesus Christ Superstar. The arena tour started in September 2012 and also starred comedian Tim Minchin as Judas Iscariot, former Spice Girl Melanie C as Mary Magdalene and BBC Radio 1 DJ Chris Moyles as Herod Antipas. Tickets for most venues went on sale on 18 May 2012.

In 2013, Lloyd Webber reunited with Christopher Hampton and Don Black on Stephen Ward the Musical. For his next project, a 2015 musical adaptation of the 2003 film School of Rock, auditions were held for children aged nine to fifteen in cooperation with the School of Rock music education program, which predated the film by several years.

In April 2016, the English National Opera staged a revival of Sunset Boulevard at the London Coliseum. The limited run, semi-staged production directed by Lonny Price brought Glenn Close to reprise her star turn as Norma Desmond, which was her first time performing the role in London; she had originated the role in Los Angeles in December 1993 and then on Broadway in November 1994 (which won her the 1995 Tony Award for Best Actress in a Musical). The 2016 London revival was so well-received that the production transferred to the Palace Theatre on Broadway in February 2017, making Lloyd Webber the first musical-theatre composer since 1953 to have four musicals running simultaneously on Broadway – a feat that his heroes Rodgers and Hammerstein had previously achieved.

Lloyd Webber's memoir, Unmasked, was published in 2018. On 9 September 2018, Lloyd Webber, along with Tim Rice and John Legend each won an Emmy for Jesus Christ Superstar Live in Concert. With this win, Lloyd Webber, Rice and Legend joined the list of people who have won Academy, Emmy, Grammy, and Tony Awards. Lloyd Webber wrote the song "Beautiful Ghosts" with Taylor Swift for the film adaptation of Cats, produced by Greg Wells and released in December 2019. In an interview in August 2020, Lloyd Webber called the film "ridiculous" in the ways that it changed the musical: "The problem with the film was that Tom Hooper decided that he didn't want anybody involved in it who was involved in the original show." He said that seeing the film caused him to get a dog.

=== 2020s ===
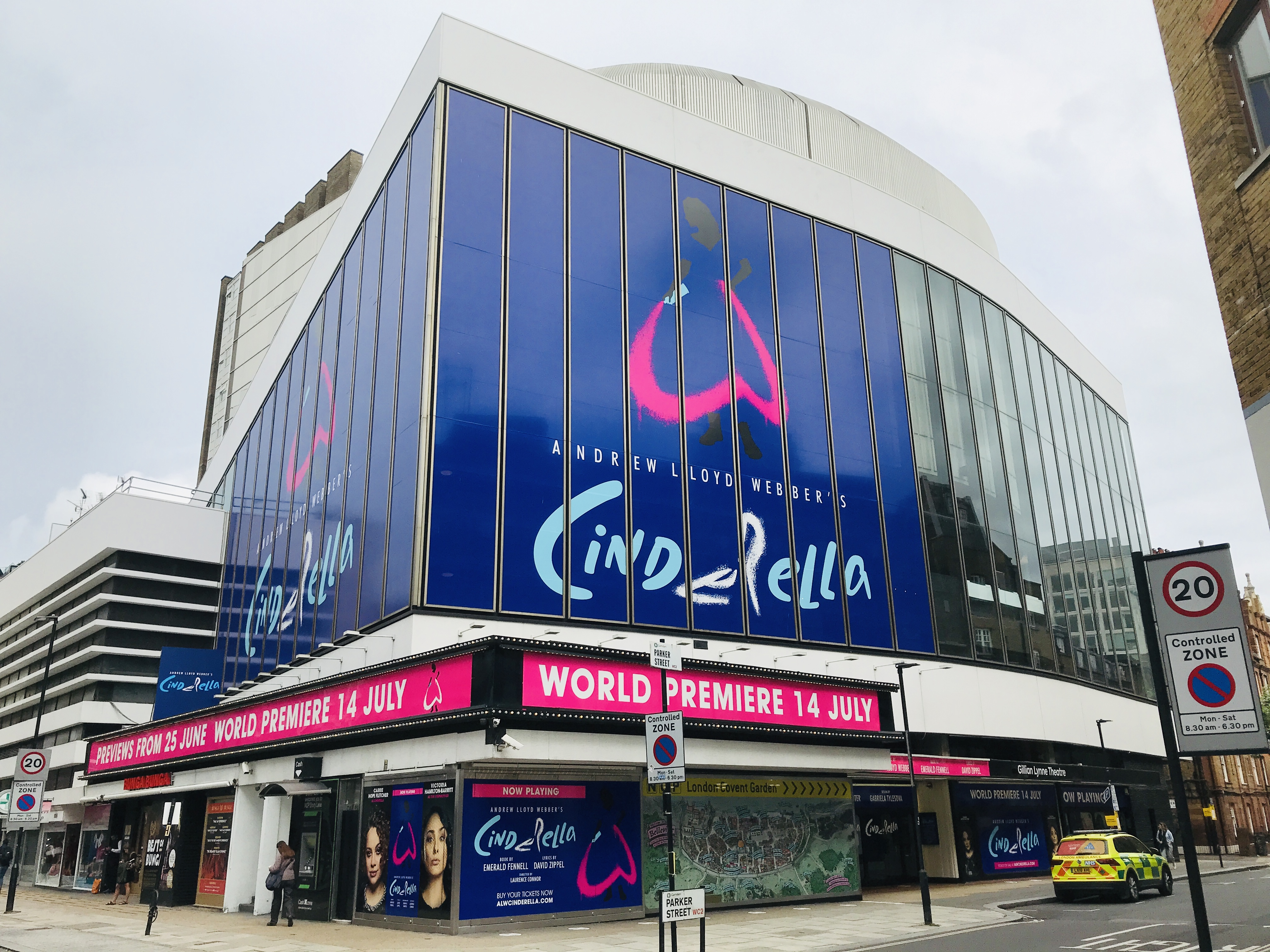
Cinderella at the West End's Gillian Lynne Theatre in July 2021

Lloyd Webber's new version of Cinderella opened at the Gillian Lynne Theatre in the West End in 2021. The opening, which was originally set to take place in August 2020, was delayed due to the COVID-19 pandemic. Based on a book by Emerald Fennell, Lloyd Webber wrote: "Emerald Fennell has written something truly exciting and original, and the moment I read her outline I knew I'd found my latest collaborator." He garnered press attention in July 2021 for saying that he was "prepared to be arrested" to open Cinderella to full houses in spite of rising Covid cases and in defiance of Government advice. A 2021 feature in Variety suggested: "Lloyd Webber, at 73, appears to have been reanimated creatively in recent years. Both School of Rock and Cinderella earned him some of the best reviews of his career and had a lightness and wit that had been missing from his work."

In 2022, Lloyd Webber appeared alongside Lin-Manuel Miranda in the BBC Platinum Jubilee Concert for Platinum Jubilee of Elizabeth II. In 2023, Lloyd Webber was one of twelve composers asked to write a new piece for the coronation of Charles III and Camilla. His anthem, "Make a Joyful Noise", was performed during the enthronement of Queen Camilla.

In 2024, Lloyd Webber announced that his next musical will be an adaptation of the 2006 film The Illusionist, which will feature lyrics by Bruno Major, book by Chris Terrio and will be directed by Jamie Lloyd and produced by Michael Harrison (following the 2023 and 2024 London and Broadway revivals of Sunset Boulevard). In 2025, Lloyd Webber reunited with Tim Rice to create the original songs for Sherlock Holmes and The 12 Days of Christmas, a comedy whodunit play written by Humphrey Ker and David Reed (members of the British sketch comedy troupe The Penny Dreadfuls), which premiered at the Birmingham Rep on 14 November 2025 for the Christmas season.

== Accusations of plagiarism ==
Among the accusations of plagiarism that Lloyd Webber has received, the Dutch composer Louis Andriessen stated that he: "has yet to think up a single note; in fact, the poor guy's never invented one note by himself. That's rather poor". Lloyd Webber's biographer, John Snelson, acknowledged a similarity between the andante movement of Mendelssohn's Violin Concerto in E minor and the Jesus Christ Superstar song "I Don't Know How to Love Him", but wrote that Lloyd Webber:

...brings a new dramatic tension to Mendelssohn's original melody through the confused emotions of Mary Magdalene. The opening theme may be Mendelssohn, but the rhythmic and harmonic treatment along with new lines of highly effective melodic development are Lloyd Webber's. The song works in its own right as its many performers and audiences can witness.

In 1992, former Pink Floyd bassist and co-lead vocalist Roger Waters accused him of plagiarising a riff from "Echoes", from the 1971 Pink Floyd album Meddle, for the opening organ riff in "The Phantom of the Opera". Waters said it was "probably actionable", but that he did not care to take it to court.

Noting similarities between Lloyd Webber's "The Music of the Night" and a recurring melody in Giacomo Puccini's 1910 opera, La fanciulla del West (The Girl of the Golden West), in 1987 the Puccini estate filed a lawsuit against Lloyd Webber, accusing him of plagiarism. The case was settled out of court, but details were not released to the public. The songwriter Ray Repp claimed in a court case that Lloyd Webber had stolen a melody from his own song "Till You", but the court ruled in Lloyd Webber's favour.

== Personal life ==
Lloyd Webber has been married three times. He married first Sarah Hugill, youngest daughter of Lieutenant-Commander Antony Hugill and Fanny née Gore Browne, on 24 July 1971; they divorced on 14 November 1983. Together they had two children, a daughter and a son:

- Imogen Lloyd Webber (born 31 March 1977)
- Nick Lloyd Webber (2 July 1979 – 25 March 2023)

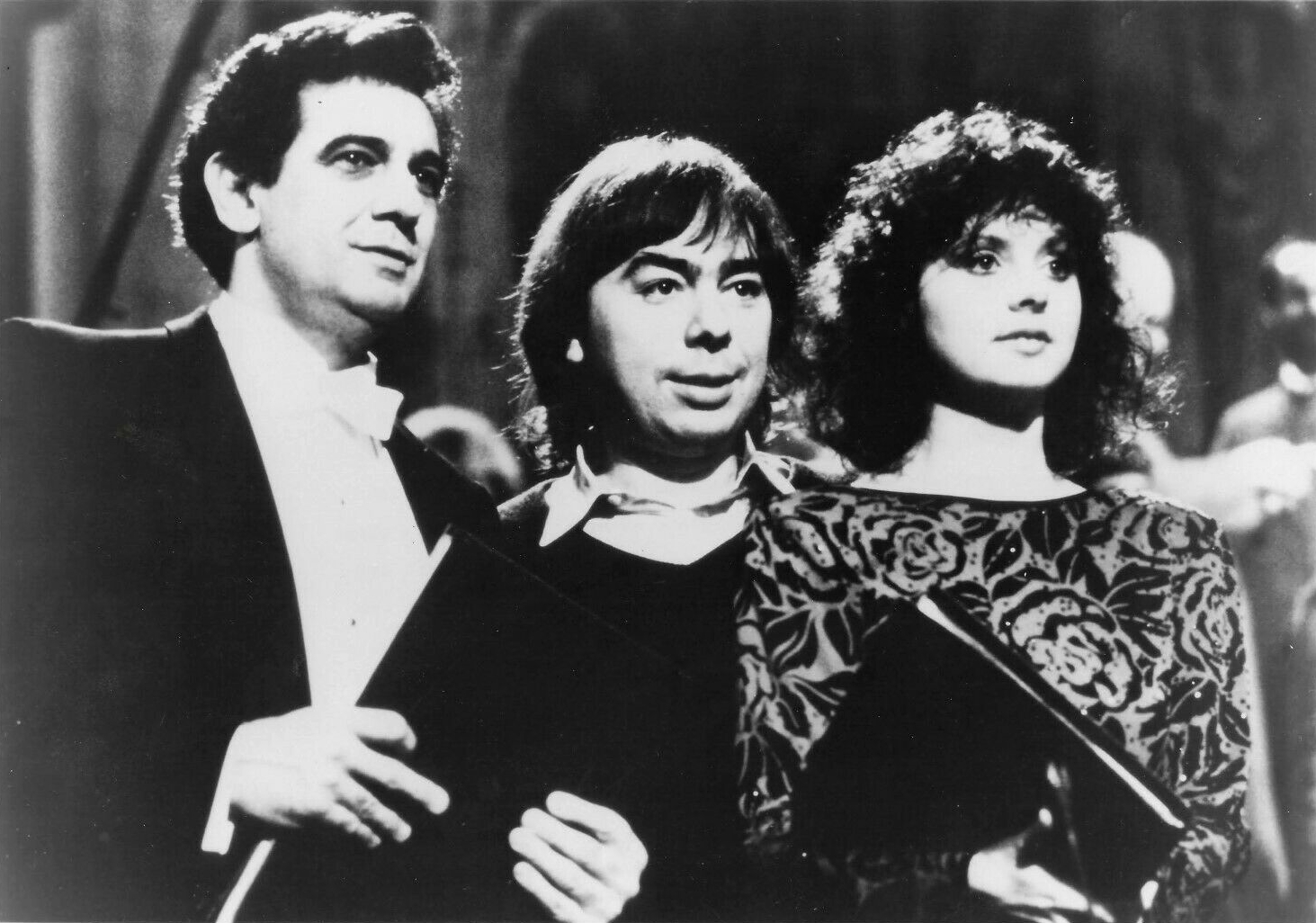
Lloyd Webber (middle) with his then-wife Sarah Brightman (right) in 1985. He would cast her as Christine in The Phantom of the Opera, which debuted in London the following year.

He then married English soprano Sarah Brightman on 22 March 1984, in Hampshire. He cast Brightman in the lead role in his musical The Phantom of the Opera, among other notable roles. They divorced on 3 January 1990, but have remained close friends, and have also continued to work together.

His third marriage was to Madeleine Gurdon in Westminster on 9 February 1991. They have three children: two sons and one daughter. They divide their time between homes in London, Hampshire, and New York. Lloyd Webber and Madeleine founded the Watership Down Stud in 1992. In 1996, they expanded their equestrian holdings by purchasing Kiltinan Castle Stud near Fethard, County Tipperary, Ireland. They were invited to ride in the King's procession at Royal Ascot 2023.

In a 1971 interview with The New York Times, Lloyd Webber said he is an agnostic. He also said he views Jesus as "one of the great figures of history". He is a lifelong supporter of London-based football club Leyton Orient F.C., as is his younger brother Julian.

In late 2009, Lloyd Webber had surgery for early-stage prostate cancer, but had to be readmitted to hospital with post-operative infection in November. In January 2010, he declared he was cancer-free. He had his prostate completely removed as a preventative measure. In 2023, Lloyd Webber's son Nicholas died at the age of 43, after an 18-month battle with gastric cancer.

Lloyd Webber has a house in Eaton Square in Belgravia, London; in 2024, he revealed he had had his house blessed by a priest in an attempt to displace a "poltergeist" that was haunting the property. Lloyd Webber has battled alcoholism through his life, and told The Telegraph in April 2026 that he has been sober for 18 months. He began collecting wine at the age of 15 and plans a 2026 Christie's auction to sell the remainder of his collection.

== Wealth ==
The Sunday Times Rich List 2006 ranked him the 87th-richest person in Britain with an estimated fortune of £700 million. His wealth increased to £750 million in 2007, but the publication ranked him 101st in 2008. The Sunday Times Rich List of 2019 saw him ranked the richest musician in the UK (overtaking Paul McCartney) with a fortune of £820 million ($1.074 billion). He lives at Sydmonton Court, Hampshire, and owns much of nearby Watership Down.

Lloyd Webber is an art collector, with a passion for Victorian painting. He bought View of Geelong (1856) by Eugene von Guerard in 1996 for A$1.98 million, then sold it in 2006 for A$3.8 million to the Geelong Gallery. An exhibition of works from his collection was presented at the Royal Academy of Arts in 2003 under the title Pre-Raphaelite and Other Masters – The Andrew Lloyd Webber Collection. In 2006, Lloyd Webber planned to sell Portrait of Angel Fernández de Soto by Pablo Picasso to benefit the Andrew Lloyd Webber Foundation. In November 2006, he withdrew the painting from auction after a claim that the previous owner had been forced to sell it under duress in Nazi Germany. An out-of-court settlement was reached, where the foundation retained ownership rights. On 23 June 2010, the painting was sold at auction for £34.7 million to an anonymous telephone bidder.

== Charity ==
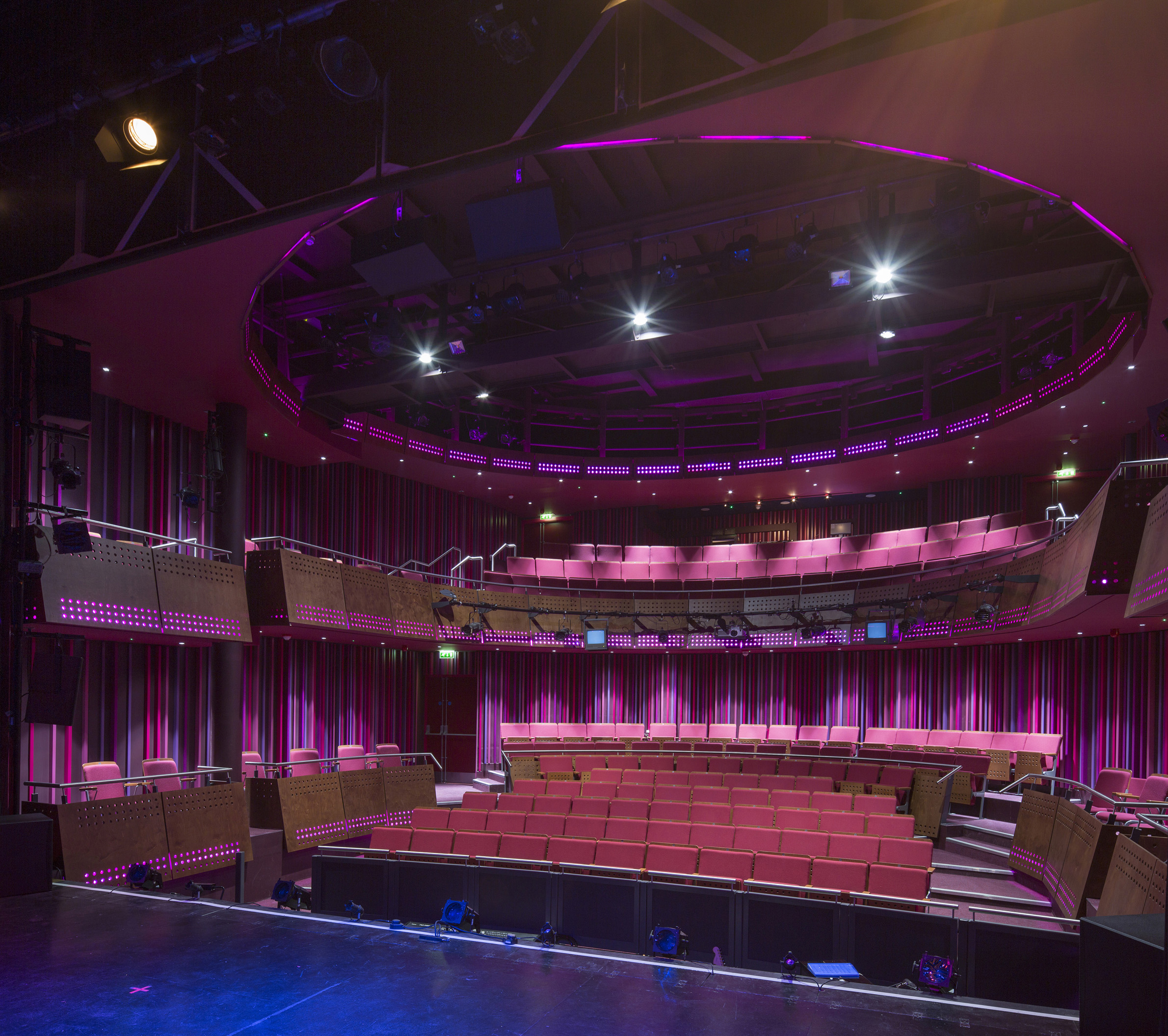
The Andrew Lloyd Webber Foundation Theatre at ArtsEd drama school in Chiswick, West London

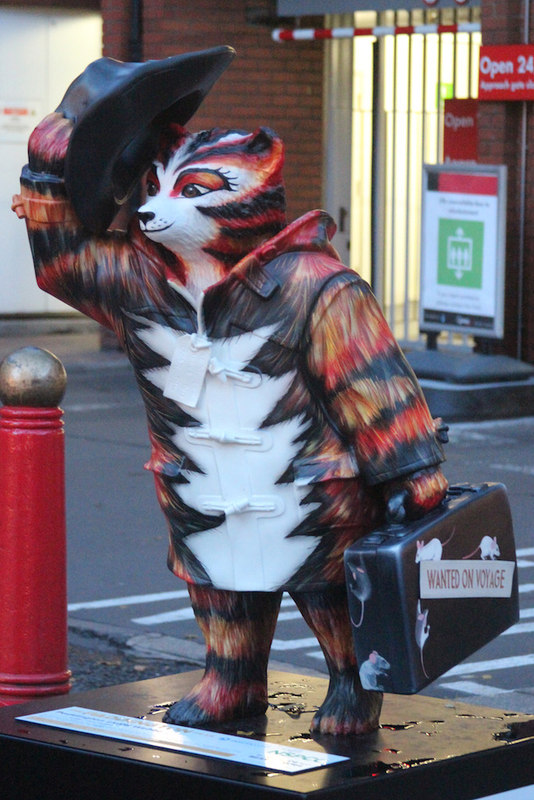
Lloyd Webber's Cats-themed Paddington Bear statue in London

Lloyd Webber is involved in a number of charitable activities, including the Elton John AIDS Foundation, Nordoff Robbins, Prostate Cancer UK and War Child. In 1992, he started the Andrew Lloyd Webber Foundation which supports the arts, culture, and heritage of the UK.

In 2007, Lloyd Webber became president of ArtsEd drama school in Chiswick, West London, and in 2013 the school was awarded a grant by Lloyd Webber's foundation to fund a refurbishment project. The money was spent on the main theatre, costume storage, the School of Film and Television and the school's access facilities.

In 2013, the Andrew Lloyd Webber Programme was launched to aid the Music in Secondary Schools Trust (MiSST), which aims to give every child at participating schools across the UK the opportunity to study a musical instrument as part of the curriculum. He told LBC: "What music does in these schools, isn't actually necessarily about trying to make the children musicians. But what it does, is it really helps them as people."

In 2014, Lloyd Webber designed a Cats-themed Paddington Bear statue, which was located in Chinatown, London (one of 50 placed around London), with the statues auctioned to raise funds for the National Society for the Prevention of Cruelty to Children (NSPCC).

== Politics ==
Lloyd Webber was made a life peer in 1997 as Baron Lloyd-Webber, of Sydmonton, in the county of Hampshire, sitting for the Conservative Party. By the end of 2015, he had voted only 33 times in the House of Lords. Politically, Lloyd Webber has supported the Conservatives, allowing his song "Take That Look Off Your Face" to be used on a party promotional film seen by an estimated one million people before the 2005 general election. In August 2014, Lloyd Webber was one of 200 public figures who were signatories to a letter to The Guardian opposing Scottish independence in the run-up to September's referendum on that issue.

In October 2015, Lloyd Webber was involved in a contentious House of Lords vote over proposed cuts to tax credits, voting with the Government in favour of the plan. Lloyd Webber was denounced by his critics because he flew in from abroad on his personal plane to vote, when his voting record was scant. In October 2017, Lloyd Webber retired from the House of Lords, stating that his busy schedule was incompatible with the demands of Parliament considering the upcoming crucial Brexit legislation.

In July 2021, he told Good Morning Britain that he would never vote for the Conservatives again, due to their handling of the COVID-19 pandemic and poor treatment of the arts sector during that time.

== Awards and honours ==
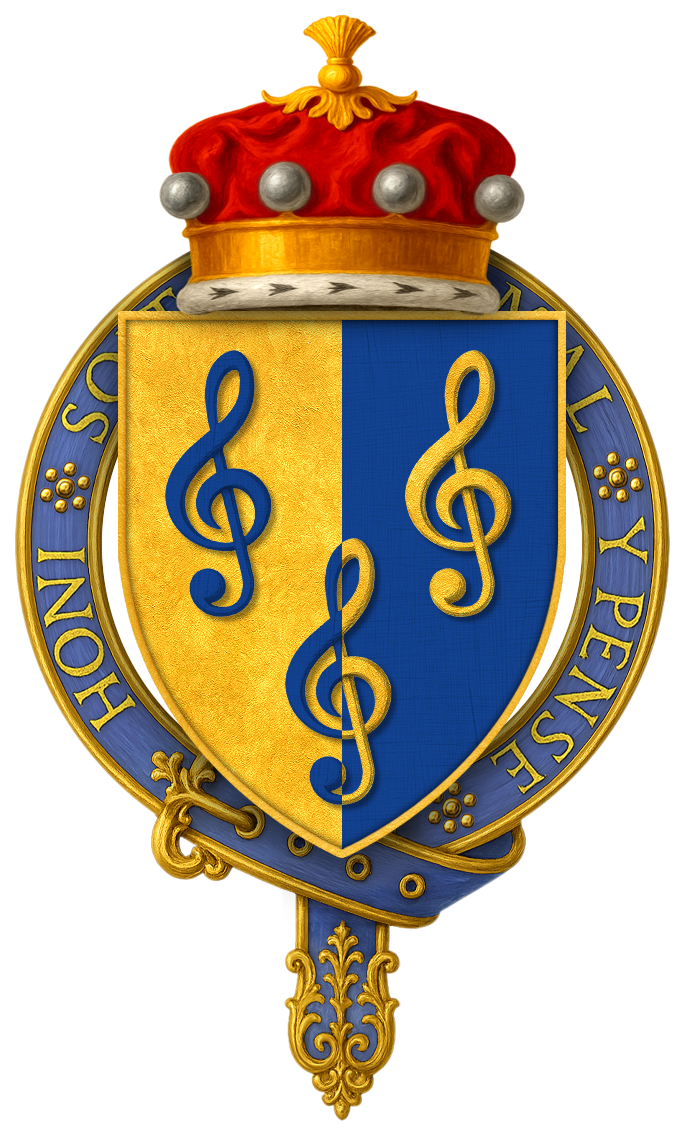
Lloyd Webber's coat of arms

Lloyd Webber was knighted in the Queen's 1992 Birthday Honours for services to the arts. He was given a life peerage in the 1997 New Year Honours and created Baron Lloyd-Webber, of Sydmonton in the County of Hampshire, on 18 February 1997. He is properly styled "The Lord Lloyd-Webber"; the title is hyphenated, although his surname is not. He sat as a Conservative member of the House of Lords until his retirement from the House on 17 October 2017.

On St George's Day 2024, he was appointed a Knight Companion of the Order of the Garter (KG).

== Theatre credits ==
Note: Music composed by Andrew Lloyd Webber unless otherwise noted.

=== Musicals ===
- The Likes of Us (1965)
  - Lyrics by Tim Rice
  - Book by Leslie Thomas
  - Not produced until 2005
- Joseph and the Amazing Technicolor Dreamcoat (1968)
  - Lyrics by Tim Rice
- Jesus Christ Superstar (1970)
  - Lyrics by Tim Rice
- Jeeves (1975)
  - Book and lyrics by Alan Ayckbourn
  - Revised in 1996 as By Jeeves
- Evita (1976)
  - Lyrics by Tim Rice
- Tell Me on a Sunday (1979)
  - Lyrics by Don Black
- Cats (1981)
  - Lyrics based on Old Possum's Book of Practical Cats by T. S. Eliot
  - Additional lyrics after Eliot by Richard Stilgoe and Trevor Nunn
- Song and Dance (1982)
  - Lyrics by Don Black (revised by Richard Maltby Jr. for Broadway)
  - Combination of Variations (1978) and Tell Me on a Sunday (1979)
- Starlight Express (1984)
  - Lyrics by Richard Stilgoe
  - Later revisions by Don Black and David Yazbek
  - Inspired by The Railway Series books by The Rev. W. Awdry.
- Cricket (1986)
  - Lyrics by Tim Rice
  - First performed for Queen Elizabeth II's 60th birthday
- The Phantom of the Opera (1986)
  - Lyrics by Charles Hart
  - Additional Lyrics by Richard Stilgoe
  - Book by Richard Stilgoe and Andrew Lloyd Webber
  - Based on the novel by Gaston Leroux
- Aspects of Love (1989)
  - Lyrics by Don Black and Charles Hart
  - Book by Andrew Lloyd Webber
  - Based on the novel by David Garnett
- Sunset Boulevard (1993)
  - Book and lyrics by Christopher Hampton and Don Black
  - Based on the 1950 film by Billy Wilder
- Whistle Down the Wind (1996)
  - Lyrics by Jim Steinman
  - Book by Patricia Knop, Andrew Lloyd Webber and Gale Edwards
- The Beautiful Game (2000)
  - Book and lyrics by Ben Elton
  - Updated as The Boys in the Photograph (2009)
- The Woman in White (2004)
  - Lyrics by David Zippel
  - Book by Charlotte Jones
  - Based on the Wilkie Collins novel
  - Based on elements of the short story The Signal-Man by Charles Dickens
- Love Never Dies (2010)
  - Book & Lyrics by Glenn Slater
  - Book by Ben Elton & Frederick Forsyth
  - Additional lyrics by Charles Hart
- The Wizard of Oz (2011)
  - Book by Andrew Lloyd Webber & Jeremy Sams
  - Music by Harold Arlen
  - Lyrics by E.Y. Harburg
  - Additional music by Andrew Lloyd Webber
  - Additional lyrics by Tim Rice
  - Based on the 1939 motion picture The Wizard of Oz
  - Based on the 1900 novel The Wonderful Wizard of Oz by L. Frank Baum
- Stephen Ward (2013)
  - Book and lyrics by Christopher Hampton and Don Black
- School of Rock (2015)
  - Lyrics by Glenn Slater
  - Book by Julian Fellowes
  - Based on the 2003 film by Richard Linklater
- Cinderella (2021)
  - Lyrics by David Zippel
  - Book by Emerald Fennell
  - Based on the classic story
  - Produced on Broadway as Bad Cinderella

=== Plays ===
- Sherlock Holmes and The 12 Days of Christmas (2025)
  - Written by Humphrey Ker and David Reed
  - Lyrics by Tim Rice

== Film adaptations ==
There have been a number of film adaptations of Lloyd Webber's musicals: Jesus Christ Superstar (1973), directed by Norman Jewison; Evita (1996), directed by Alan Parker; The Phantom of the Opera (2004), directed by Joel Schumacher and co-produced by Lloyd Webber; and Cats (2019), directed by Tom Hooper and executive produced by Lloyd Webber. Cats (1998), Joseph and the Amazing Technicolor Dreamcoat (1999), Jesus Christ Superstar (2000) and By Jeeves (2001) have been adapted into made-for-television films that have been released on DVD and VHS and often air on BBC.

A special performance of The Phantom of the Opera at the Royal Albert Hall for the 25th anniversary was broadcast live to cinemas in early October 2011 and later released on DVD and Blu-ray in February 2012. The same was also done with a reworked version of Love Never Dies. Filmed in Melbourne, it received a limited cinema release in the US and Canada in 2012, to see if it would be viable to bring the show to Broadway.

== Other works ==
- Gumshoe (1971) – Film score.
- The Odessa File (1974) – Film score.
- Variations (1978) – A set of musical variations on Niccolò Paganini's Caprice in A minor that Lloyd Webber composed for his brother, cellist Julian. This album featured fifteen rock musicians including guitarist Gary Moore and pianist Rod Argent and reached number 2 in the UK album chart upon its release. It was later combined with Tell Me on a Sunday to form one show, Song and Dance. Lloyd Webber also used variation five as the basis for Unexpected Song in Song and Dance. The main theme is used as the theme music to The South Bank Show.
- Requiem (1985) – A classical choral work composed in honour of his father, William.
- Watership Down (1999) – Lloyd Webber and Mike Batt, main soundtrack composer of the animated series adaptation of Richard Adams' novel of the same name, composed the song "Fields of Sun". The actual song was never used on the show, nor was it available on the CD soundtrack that was released at the time. He was however still credited for the unused song in the show's opening titles.

== Discography ==
Musicals and show recordings

- The Likes of Us (1965)
- Joseph and the Amazing Technicolor Dreamcoat (1968)
- Jesus Christ Superstar (1970)
  - Jesus Christ Superstar (1970)
- Jeeves (1975)
- Evita (1976)
  - Evita (1976)
  - Evita: Premiere American Recording (1979)
- Tell Me on a Sunday (1979)
- Cats (1981)
  - Cats: Complete Original Broadway Cast Recording (1983)
- Song and Dance (1982)
- Starlight Express (1984)
- The Phantom of the Opera (1986)
- Aspects of Love (1989)
- Sunset Boulevard (1993)
- Whistle Down the Wind (1998)
- The Beautiful Game (2000)
- The Woman in White (2004)
- Love Never Dies (2010)
- The Wizard of Oz (2011)
- Stephen Ward (2013)
- School of Rock (2015)
- Cinderella (2021)
- Bad Cinderella (2023)

Other albums

- Variations (1978)
- Variations with London Philharmonic Orchestra (1986)
- Symphonic Suites (2021)

Awards and achievements
Preceded by Stephen Sondheim for Sweeney Todd: The Demon Barber of Fleet Street	Grammy Award for Best Cast Show Album; 1980 for Evita shared with Tim Rice	Succeeded by Quincy Jones for Lena Horne: The Lady and Her Music
Preceded by Henry Krieger – Composer, Tom Eyen – Lyricist, David Foster – Producer for Dreamgirls	Grammy Award for Best Cast Show Album; 1983 for Cats	Succeeded by Stephen Sondheim – Composer and lyricist, Thomas Z. Shepard for Sunday in the Park with George
Preceded by None	Grammy Award for Best Contemporary Classical Composition; 1985 for Requiem	Succeeded by Witold Lutosławski for Symphony No. 3
Orders of precedence in the United Kingdom
Preceded by The Lord Whitty	Gentlemen; Baron Lloyd-Webber	Followed by The Lord Falconer of Thoroton
