= Sydmonton Court =

Country house in Hampshire, England

Coordinates: 51.3186°N 1.3052°W

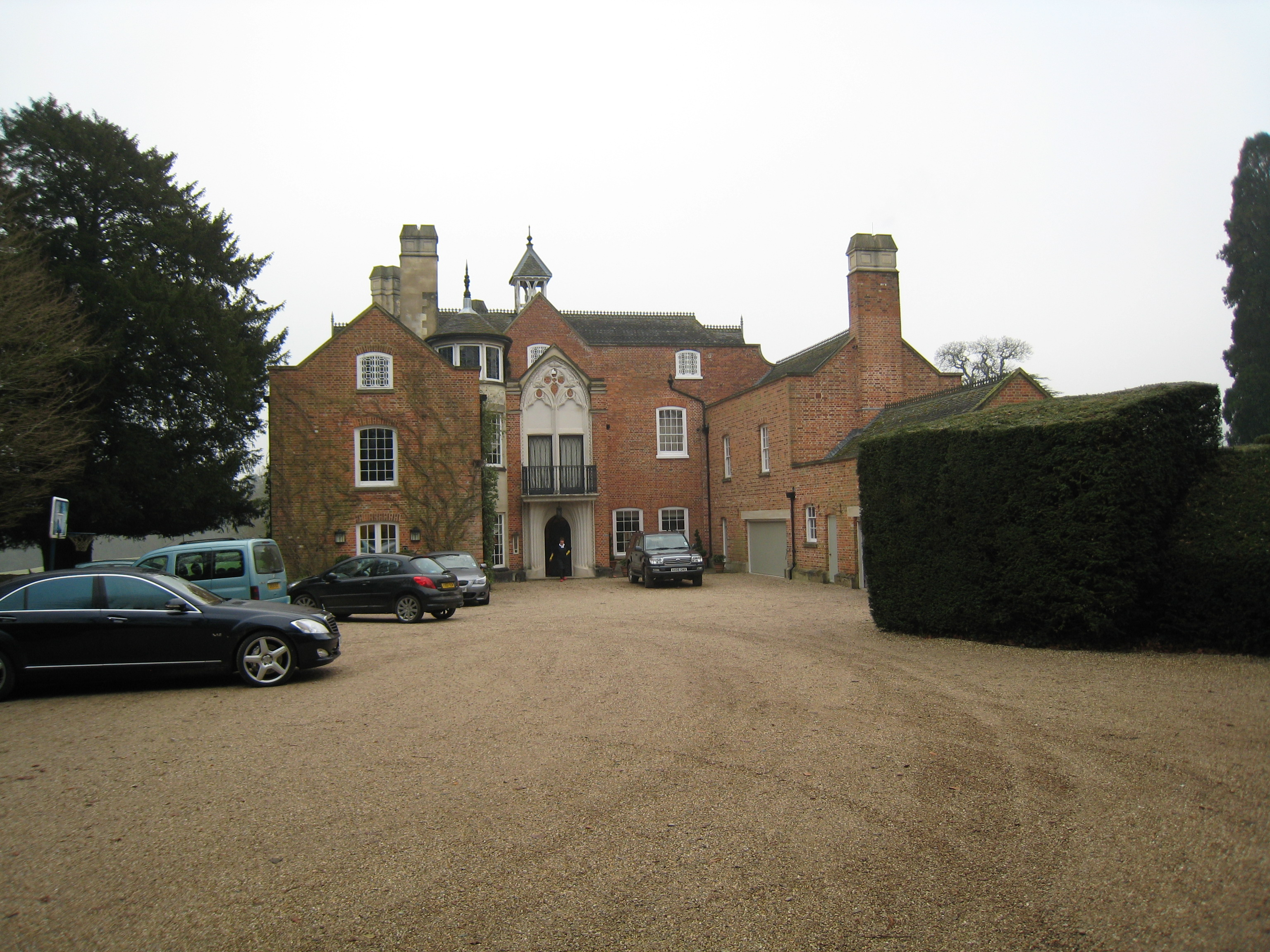
Sydmonton Court in December 2008

Sydmonton Court is an English country house in Hampshire. Built and developed over the centuries, it is surrounded by a 5,000 acre estate, in the parish of Ecchinswell, Sydmonton and Bishops Green, near Watership Down. The house has been listed Grade II* on the National Heritage List for England since 1984, and St Mary's church within the estate is also Grade II* listed. It is owned by the composer & impresario Andrew Lloyd Webber and his wife, equestrian entrepreneur Madeleine Gurdon.

The eclectic nature of its architecture led the house to be described by architectural historian Nikolaus Pevsner as "the sort of English Architectural mongrel you want to rescue and love for the rest of your life".

== Gardens ==
The gardens of Sydmonton Court are listed grade II on the Register of Historic Parks and Gardens. The gardens were featured in the 2017 book The Secret Gardeners by Victoria Summerley and photographer Hugo Rittson Thomas.
