= The Beautiful Game (musical) =

- Original cast recording
- Music: Andrew Lloyd Webber
- Lyrics: Ben Elton
- Book: Ben Elton
- Productions: 2000 West End; 2008 Liverpool; 2009 Canada Tour; 2018 Off-West End; 2019 Melbourne

The Beautiful Game (sometimes performed as The Boys in the Photograph) is a musical by Andrew Lloyd Webber and Ben Elton about a group of teenagers growing up during The Troubles in Belfast, Northern Ireland in 1969.

The title of the musical (The Beautiful Game) is a commonly used reference to association football, the origins of which are disputed. The plot, which is centred on a local football (soccer) team, focuses on the attempt to overcome the violence that has engulfed their community. The Catholic team has one atheist player, Del (who comes from a Protestant family) and the coach is a priest. The musical chronicles some of the key players during the emerging political and religious violence. Some of the players become IRA volunteers, and another is knee-capped. The musical also chronicles the emotional change in the protagonist from political ambivalence to becoming an IRA volunteer.

The most successful song from the score was "Our Kind of Love", which had originally been performed by Kiri Te Kanawa as "The Heart Is Slow to Learn". It was cut from the re-worked version of the show in 2008, and used as the title song to Lloyd Webber's sequel to The Phantom of the Opera, Love Never Dies.

== Production history ==
In 1998, Lloyd Webber invited Elton to dinner to discuss the possibility of the latter working on a rewrite of the script for Starlight Express, updating the humour of the original. Elton declined but suggested the possibility of a new musical, with an entirely original storyline, having observed that most musicals were based upon existing ideas. The two writers settled upon the idea of setting a story amid The Troubles in Belfast.

The world premiere of The Beautiful Game opened on 26 September 2000 at the Cambridge Theatre in London and closed 1 September 2001, after a total run of slightly more than 11 months. The production featured Josie Walker, David Shannon, Ben Goddard, Hannah Waddingham, Alex Sharpe and Michael Shaeffer in leading roles. Dianne Pilkington and Shonagh Daly were ensemble members. It was directed by Robert Carsen with choreography by Australian choreographer Meryl Tankard.

The show was met with a mixed reception from the critics: while the production and Lloyd Webber's score were largely praised, Elton's book and lyrics came under fire for being crass, predictable and undistinguished although John Peter in his review in The Sunday Times wrote "Elton's book and lyrics burst with energy, indignation and intelligence. Brave and bitterly truthful...this show...need not fear comparison with West Side Story. Offhand, I cannot think of greater praise". The show never made it to Broadway.

A rewrite by Lloyd-Webber and Elton, with the new title The Boys in the Photograph, received a workshop production by students at the Liverpool Institute for Performing Arts in April 2008, directed by Nick Phillips. Subsequently, in April 2009 a full-scale production was presented at the Manitoba Theatre Centre in Winnipeg, Manitoba, Canada. This production transferred to the Royal Alexandra Theatre in Toronto, Ontario, Canada in September 2009. The rewrite gave a more uplifting ending than in the original production.

In February 2012, Northern Ireland youth group Fusion Theatre produced the show for the first time in its native Northern Ireland. Directed by Ian Milford with choreography by Rebecca Leonard, the cross-community youth chorus performed it for a week-long run. The show was attended by representatives of Lloyd Webber's Really Useful Group. The company took the show to compete at the Waterford Festival of Light Opera in Ireland in May 2012.

The original production's choreographer, Meryl Tankard, directed and choreographed the Australian premiere at the Western Australian Academy of Performing Arts in August 2016, performed by 3rd year students there.

A new production performed by the National Youth Music Theatre students had a limited run at the Other Palace in London on 15–18 August 2018.

In September 2019, Manilla Street Productions staged the professional Australian premiere in Melbourne at Chapel Off Chapel. Directed by Karen Jemison, it starred Stephanie Wall and Stephen Mahy.

Although being based in Northern Ireland, The Beautiful Game has only been performed there twice, by two amateur theatre companies, the first being Fusion Theatre Lisburn in 2012 and the second time being Belvoir Players in 2023.

== Synopsis ==
=== The Beautiful Game ===
Act One

Football is part of everyday life in 1960s and 1970s Northern Ireland, as the overture and opening number ("The Beautiful Game") demonstrate. It is especially important for Father O'Donnell's team, who are having their first practice on the first day of the season. The star player, John Kelly, seems to be a little more interested in one of the girls on the sidelines than he is in the priest, and as a punishment is forced to stay behind and take care of the equipment ("Clean the Kit"). Meanwhile, Thomas, a fervent Irish Catholic nationalist leads a group of thugs to force Del off the team. Mary, the girl John had been noticing during the practice, comes to the locker room to talk to him. Although they initially fight their attraction (Don't Like You), they soon decide to give it a try.

Time passes. John and Mary are quite serious with each other now. She asks him one evening to join her in a civil rights march but he is more interested in going drinking with his friends. Left alone, Mary is unable to understand why anyone would not love Ireland and want to make it better. Her sentiments are echoed - almost - by a girl with the rival Protestant team ("God's Own Country"). John changes his mind and returns to go to the march with Mary, because she is more important to him ("God's Own Country", "Protestant March").

The team makes it to the final, but their celebration is cut short when a group of Protestants trash the locker room. Christine and Del emerge to find the wreckage - they had been making love in hiding during the raid. Surveying the mess, they both wish all the fighting would stop so they could get on with their lives ("Let Us Love in Peace").

It comes down to the final. After the other team tied the goal on a penalty shot, John scores the winning goal ("The Final"). The boys celebrate at a local pub ("Off to the Party, The Craic"). Del comes to see Christine, but Thomas and his friends quickly remind him that he isn't welcome. Rather than causing any more unpleasantness, he leaves. Meanwhile, Ginger has finally got up the nerve to speak to Bernadette, who returns his affection ("Don't Like You Reprise"). They have a first, small kiss, and then she has to go, and Ginger helps Daniel home. After seeing him to his door, Ginger is about to head home himself when he's confronted by a gang of Protestant thugs. He attempts, unsuccessfully, to escape.

Christine and Mary are discussing the previous evening at Mary's house. Mary disapproves of the relationship with Del until Christine convinces her that love knows no boundaries ("Our Kind of Love"). They are interrupted by John who brings the horrible news - Ginger is dead. Thomas arrives and asks John to go with them to get revenge, but he refuses - more violence won't do any good. As they comfort each other and go to the funeral, they all long for an end to the division and for a chance to live a normal life ("Let Us Love in Peace Reprise").

Act Two

John and Mary are getting married, and there are some nerves on all sides ("The Happiest Day"). When the time comes to make their vows though, there are no doubts ("To Have and to Hold"). Finally, they are left alone in their hotel room for their first night together. Both are nervous, but together they work it out ("The First Time").

In the middle of the night, the phone rings. It's Thomas, in trouble. He asks for John's help. Mary doesn't want him to go, but John feels he owes it to his friend even though he doesn't agree with what he's doing. He finally finds Thomas and tells him it's the only time he'll ever do something like this. Thomas tries to explain to him why he has to do what he does ("I'd Rather Die on My Feet Than Live on My Knees"). John is finally going to get his big break at the football trials. On her way to watch, Mary says goodbye to Christine and Del, who are moving to New York to escape the situation there. Mary figures she and John will go to England, and they talk about leaving their home ("God's Own Country Reprise"). John makes a great impression and the coaches want him, but someone else wants him too - the police. Someone has tipped them off and he is taken to prison, before Mary even has a chance to tell him that she's pregnant ("The Selection").

John is put with the other IRA prisoners. He tries to stay apart from them, but they work away at him and eventually he begins to think like them. Even Mary has trouble getting through to him. ("Dead Zone"). She has her baby, a boy named Sean, and Daniel comes over to visit. While he's there, Thomas and two other IRA agents barge in and accuse Daniel of betraying John. They shoot him in the knee, crippling him. Mary is horrified and wonders if any good could possibly come out of all this violence ("If This is What We're Fighting For"). John is finally released, and his first stop is to see Thomas, because he has realized that it was Thomas who turned him over to the police. After confronting him, John kills him.

Mary enters. She tries to find the man within John that she fell in love with, but he is buried too deep. John is going to England to work for the IRA. He leaves his soccer jersey and a picture of the championship team for his son ("All the Love I Have"). As Father O'Donnell comes to collect Sean for the football practice, Mary hopes that the cycle of hate can be stopped with her son ("Finale").

=== The Boys in the Photograph ===
Act One

The Boys in the Photograph begins with Mary, Christine and Bernadette singing the titular number ("The Boys in the Photograph") in front of a monochrome photograph of the Belfast soccer team that is the focus of the play. After this the majority of the casts join in a number about the importance of soccer or football in the lives of the young people of Belfast, Northern Ireland which is currently on the brink of a cultural war. After this Father O'Donnell begins the roll call for the football team including: John Kelly, the team's star player who is more interested in showing off in front of girls than practicing seriously; Thomas Malloy, John's best friend, who is more driven, a fervent Catholic nationalist who wears glasses (which need to be taped to his head while playing and are referred to multiple times during the play); Del Copeland, the only Protestant on the team (who states he is an atheist); Daniel Gillen, who has a reputation of stealing radios from cars (though he argues that with so many riots taking place it only makes sense to steal the radios before the cars are burnt), and Ginger O'Shaughnessy, who wants the conflicts between Protestants and Catholics to end and to be called by his real name (Gregory). We also meet Mary a bright out-spoken young woman who believes that the conflict can be resolved through peaceful protests; Bernadette, a very religious and prudent girl who has been in love with Ginger since they were children; and Christine, who defies her Catholic up-bringing not only by going with several boys but also by the man she marries later on.

After the practice Father O'Donnell gives each member of the team a copy of the team photograph along with the lecture to "…Never forget the promise of your youth. This picture is who you are, who you become is up to you". He puts John on equipment cleaning duty, much to John's annoyance ("Cleaning Kit"). While John is imagining his future as the star player for a national team, Mary walks in and tells him that he'll never make a national team since he spends too much time chasing girls. Father O'Donnell then enters the locker room and tells John that the reason he's harder on him is because he believes that John could be great if he focuses on his game and that there will be plenty of time for girls once he's famous and can have any kind of girl he wants (to the disgust of Mary, who is hiding nearby as girls aren't allowed in the locker room). John and Mary further argue with each other ("Don't Like You") and eventually grow close and fall in love. Meanwhile, Thomas, along with a couple of nameless teammates, threaten Del with violence if he comes to practice again. (Thomas has no tolerance for Protestants after one beat up his sister; this also provides a hint of things to come).

Eventually Mary and John are in a steady relationship with one another and although at first he does not want to join her in civil rights demonstrations, being more interested in having fun with his teammates leaving Mary disappointed, not only with John but with her neighbours' defeatist attitude ("God's Own Country/God's Own Country", "Protestant March"). John eventually comes around and decides that he at least should be there for Mary. Meanwhile, Christine and Del have had their own romantic encounter having both taken shelter in an abandoned car during a raid and discovering that despite their different backgrounds that they have a lot in common ("Born In Belfast").

Eventually the final game of the season comes and the team has a chance to win the championship ("The Final"), and despite Thomas being caught by the referee for tripping a member of the other team giving them a penalty kick, John manages to score the winning goal. After their victory the team and their supporters go celebrate at the local pub ("Off To The Party"/"The Craic"). Del and Christine also go to the party though Thomas makes it clear that they aren't welcome while John wonders where he's been all season and despite Christine's insistence that Del has as much of a right to be there as any other member of the team, Del insists that they should leave to avoid causing any trouble. At the same time Ginger and Bernadette begin to realize their feelings for each other, their shared wishes for peace and kiss for the first time ("Let Us Love In Peace"). However, after the party Ginger helps Daniel home and on the way back to his own home, is mortally wounded by a gang of young Protestants and is unable to get away.

Meanwhile, the girls are gathered at one of their homes and discussing the evening and their relationships when they receive news that Ginger has been killed and was found miles away from where he went missing. At the funeral Thomas wants to go get revenge for Ginger's death but is talked out of it when he is reminded that he does not know which Protestant boys are to blame and that if he were to attack some random boys that he would be no better than they are.

Act Two

The second act begins with John and Mary's wedding day and both are nervous about committing to marry ("The Happiest Day of Our Lives") but manage to get through the ceremony. Later the two are alone and spending their first night alone together in a hotel and looking back on their relationship so far ("All The Love I Have"/"Don't Like You" - reprise) and are nervous to be having their first intercourse, but eventually do manage to overcome the feelings of awkwardness ("The First Time"). Later that night they receive a phone call from Thomas who is wanted for his IRA activities, and while trying to reach a safe house has lost his glasses. Although Mary protests that he could be arrested also for helping Thomas or even killed, John insists that he can't leave his friend and that this will be the only time he does this. John eventually finds Thomas and drives him to the safe house while the two make it clear to the other that they don't understand their stance on the issue ("I'd Rather Die On My Feet Than Live On My Knees").

Some time later John is finally getting the chance to try out for a national team and is making a great impression on the team scouts. Meanwhile, Mary is saying good bye to Christine, Del and their baby son Hendrix who are moving overseas (God's Own Country-Reprise) and reveals to Christine that she is going to have a child of her own soon, but is waiting until after John's tryouts to tell him. Unfortunately she doesn't get the chance to tell him until much later as he's arrested after the tryouts for helping Thomas escape. John is then sent to prison after other IRA prisoners act as if he were one of them. He explains that he is not an IRA volunteer and was only arrested because he tried to help a friend while the other agents tell him the only friends he has now are his prison-mates. As John adjusts to prison life while waiting to be released, he becomes more and more frustrated with the world that has failed him ("The Dead Zone").

Eventually Mary has her child, a son Sean. One night Thomas (whom Mary recognizes immediately, due to his glasses) enters her home with other IRA members and tells her that Daniel, who is sitting in the living room, is the one who reported John to the authorities. Daniel argues that he would never do such a thing, but despite support from Mary and Bernadette, is still taken outside and kneecapped ("If This Is What We're Fighting For"). Eventually John is released from prison, but has been radicalized and wants to go to England on an IRA mission. After John gives her his football jersey for their son, Mary gives John a copy of the team photograph telling him that before he goes to England to remember that his true self was his first victim.

Although he still goes to "take care of some business", John does remember what Father O'Donnell said when he gave them the photo but still tracks down Thomas, having noticed while in jail how suspicious it was that Thomas wasn't arrested. Thomas then reveals that he has managed to stay out of jail by reporting others and that he no longer cares if he dies or not since the cycle of violence is endless and he has more than replaced himself with angry men ("It Will Never End"). John is poised to shoot Thomas but in the end he takes Mary's comment to heart and puts his gun away telling the other man "I could shoot the man you've become, but I can't shoot the man you were" and leaves. Thomas bids his last farewell to John, knowing that he probably won't live long. As John leaves a gunshot is heard off stage.

Meanwhile, Mary is sitting at home, looking at her copy of the team photograph and looking back on the fates of most of the boys, when John arrives having remembered who he really is ("All The Love I Have"). Then the finale begins ("The Beautiful Game" finale) and the screen that had been used throughout the play reveals the bright futures that awaited everyone including John, who, despite his not making the national team did become the coach of his school's team. Sean grew up hating football and went into fine arts while his younger sister did make a national team and that the division did eventually end after 30 years.

== List of musical numbers ==
Act I

- Overture
- The Beautiful Game
- The Boys in the Photograph*
- Clean the Kit
- Don't Like You
- God's Own Country
- God's Own Country – (Protestant March)
- Born in Belfast*
- The Final
- The Party
- Let Us Love In Peace
- Let Us Love In Peace (reprise)

Act II

- The Happiest Day of Our Lives
- All The Love I Have*
- Don't Like You (Reprise)
- The First Time
- I'd Rather Die On My Feet Than Live On My Knees
- God's Own Country/Born in Belfast (reprise)
- Our Kind of Love **
- The Selection
- Dead Zone
- If This Is What We're Fighting For
- It Will Never End*
- All The Love I Have* (Reprise)
- Finale – The Beautiful Game

(*= Songs added for The Boys in the Photograph)

(**= Songs removed from The Beautiful Game for The Boys in the Photograph)

== Other performances ==
- Shonagh Daly performed "Let Us Love in Peace" as the closing song at the memorial service for families of the September 11 attacks in October 2001
- A selection of songs from the musical were performed for President-elect George W. Bush and UK Prime Minister Tony Blair at a reception in Washington on 18 January 2001

== Awards and nominations ==
- Best Musical Award, Critics' Circle Theatre Awards (2000)
- Best Actress in a musical, Josie Walker (Olivier Awards 2001) Nominee
- Best Performer in a Supporting Role – Musical Theatre, Samuel Skuthorp (Green Room Awards 2020) Nominee
- Best Sound Design – Musical Theatre, Marcello Lo Ricco (Green Room Awards 2020) Nominee
