= Any Dream Will Do (song) =

1968 song by Andrew Lloyd Webber and Tim Rice

"Any Dream Will Do" is a show tune written by Andrew Lloyd Webber and Tim Rice for the 1968 musical Joseph and the Amazing Technicolor Dreamcoat. It is generally the beginning and the concluding song of the musical, sung by the title character of Joseph.

The song has been sung by numerous performers. In 1969, it was released as the B-side of the 7-inch single "We Will Rock You" by child singer Christopher. This recording was produced by Andrew Lloyd Webber and Tim Rice, and arranged by Andrew Lloyd Webber. Max Bygraves released a popular version in 1972 which had another track from the show on the B-side "Close Every Door To Me". This may have been the most popular version released. Joe Cuddy's version was a number-one hit in Ireland in 1974. The song was voted Broadway Song of the Year in 1981, and won an Ivor Novello Award in 1991.

The song was also covered by Jason Donovan and Lee Mead, whose versions reached number one and number two respectively in the UK chart. Donovan, Mead and Donny Osmond performed the song at the Concert for Diana on 1 July 2007. Donovan performed the song at the Platinum Party at the Palace on 4 June 2022.

== Jason Donovan version ==
"Any Dream Will Do"

Single by Jason Donovan
- B-side: "Close Every Door"
- Released: 10 June 1991
- Length: 3:54
- Label: Really Useful Group; Polydor
- Composer: Andrew Lloyd Webber
- Lyricist: Tim Rice
- Producer: Nigel Wright

Jason Donovan singles chronology
| "R.S.V.P" (1991) | "Any Dream Will Do" (1991) | "Happy Together" (1991) |

In 1991, the song was released as a single by Jason Donovan, who was then playing Joseph in the West End production of the musical at the London Palladium. The single topped the UK Singles Chart for two weeks in June and July 1991; in July, it was certified Gold by the BPI for sales greater than 400,000 copies. In Donovan's native Australia, "Any Dream Will Do" peaked at number 92 on the ARIA Singles Chart in August 1991. The song was also a number-one hit in Ireland and a number-three hit in Austria.

=== Charts ===
==== Weekly charts ====
| Chart (1991) | Peak position |
|---|---|
| Australia (ARIA) | 92 |
| Austria (Ö3 Austria Top 40) | 3 |
| Belgium (Ultratop 50 Flanders) | 19 |
| Europe (Eurochart Hot 100) | 7 |
| Europe (European Hit Radio) | 22 |
| Finland (Suomen virallinen lista) | 23 |
| Germany (GfK) | 55 |
| Ireland (IRMA) | 1 |
| Luxembourg (Radio Luxembourg) | 1 |
| Netherlands (Single Top 100) | 55 |
| UK Singles (Official Charts) | 1 |
| UK Airplay (Music Week) | 7 |

==== Year-end charts ====
| Chart (1991) | Position |
|---|---|
| Austria (Ö3 Austria Top 40) | 13 |
| Europe (Eurochart Hot 100) | 64 |
| UK Singles (OCC) | 6 |

==== Decade-end charts ====
| Chart (1990–1999) | Rank |
|---|---|
| Austria (Ö3 Austria Top 40) | 9 |

=== Certifications ===
| Region | Certification | Certified units/sales |
|---|---|---|
| United Kingdom (BPI) | Gold | 400,000^{^} |
^{^} Shipments figures based on certification alone.

== Any Dream Will Do and Lee Mead version ==
"Any Dream Will Do"

Single by Lee Mead

from the album Lee Mead
- B-side: "Close Every Door" (with Keith Jack and Lewis Bradley)
- Released: 12 June 2007
- Length: 3:51
- Label: Really Useful Group; Fascination
- Composer: Andrew Lloyd Webber
- Lyricist: Tim Rice
- Producer: Nigel Wright

In 2007, the BBC One television series Any Dream Will Do, named after the song, searched for a new, unknown lead to play Joseph in a West End revival of Joseph and the Amazing Technicolor Dreamcoat. The song was performed by the twelve contestants on the programme as the opening number to the first show, and it was performed again by Lee Mead, voted by the public as the winner of the series, as the finale to the series.

After the series, a single was released featuring "Any Dream Will Do", sung by Mead as the winner, and "Close Every Door", another song from Joseph which had been used each week as a contestant left the programme. It was performed by Mead along with second-placed Keith Jack and third-placed Lewis Bradley.

The single was released for digital download on 12 June 2007 and entered the UK Singles Chart on 17 June at number 18. After being released on CD on 18 June, it charted at number two on 24 June. It was held from the number-one spot by Rihanna and Jay-Z with their hit single "Umbrella". Downloads and CD single sales raise funds for the BBC's annual Children in Need charity appeal.

=== Weekly charts ===
| Chart (2007) | Peak position |
|---|---|
| Europe (Eurochart Hot 100) | 9 |
| Scottish Singles Sales (Official Charts) | 1 |
| UK Singles (Official Charts) | 2 |

=== Year-end charts ===
| Chart (2007) | Position |
|---|---|
| UK Singles (OCC) | 123 |

== Performances and influences ==
- Donny Osmond, who has performed as Joseph in the musical successfully for many years in the 1990s, also recorded the song. His recording of the musical with the Canadian cast has sold 250,000 copies. He was also cast in the role of Joseph in the 1999 film of Joseph and the Amazing Technicolor Dreamcoat.
- The songs "Ripple" (1970) by the Grateful Dead and the gospel hymn "Because He Lives" (1971), are both similar musically to "Any Dream Will Do".
