= Close Every Door =

Song from the musical Joseph and the Amazing Technicolor Dreamcoat

CD cover of Phillip Schofield's 1992 single release of Close Every Door

"Close Every Door" is a show tune from the musical Joseph and the Amazing Technicolor Dreamcoat by Tim Rice and Andrew Lloyd Webber. It is the penultimate song of the first act of the musical, sung by Joseph while imprisoned for his supposed relationship with Mrs. Potiphar. Along with "Any Dream Will Do", it is one of the most popular songs from the musical.

In addition to voicing Joseph's despair at being jailed for a crime he did not commit, the song also touches on the history of Jewish persecution; for instance, the lyrics "Just give me a number instead of my name... Destroy me completely, then throw me away" reflect the well-documented Nazi practices during the Holocaust. The lyrics have even been incorporated into a Seder service for educators in New South Wales.

Australian singer Jon English released a version as a single in Australia in 1973.

The song was released as a single by former BBC children's TV anchor Phillip Schofield in 1992, when he played the role of Joseph in the London Palladium production, with "Any Dream Will Do" as a B-side. The single peaked 27 in the UK charts. He later sang "Close Every Door" at the Royal Variety Performance.

A special cello version of the song was recorded by Julian Lloyd Webber for the 1989 album Lloyd Webber Plays Lloyd Webber, reissued and expanded in 2001.

The song was used as the exit song on Andrew Lloyd Webber's BBC One reality show Any Dream Will Do, sung by the "Joseph" leaving each show as he hands his dreamcoat back to the remaining contestants. On 9 June 2007 The Phantom of the Opera ensemble member and Raoul understudy Lee Mead won the role of Joseph.

On 10 June 2007, Mead recorded Any Dream Will Do and was joined by third-placed Lewis Bradley and second-placed Keith Jack on "Close Every Door". The single was released to raise funds for the BBC's Children in Need charity. On 17 June 2007 Mead's solo track entered the UK singles chart at No.18 on downloads only. A double A-sided CD single of both Mead's solo track and the ensemble recording was released on 18 June 2007. The single, credited to Mead, rose to No.2 on 24 June 2007.
