= Coat of many colors =

Coat with religious significance

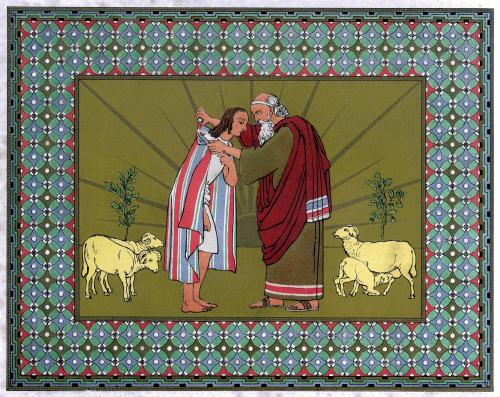
Jacob blesses Joseph and gives him the coat.

In the Hebrew Bible, the coat of many colors or ketonet passim (Biblical Hebrew: כְּתֹנֶת פַּסִּים, romanized: kəṯoneṯ passim) is the name for the garment that the Biblical Joseph owned; it was given to him by his father Jacob in Vayeshev (Genesis 37).

== Biblical narrative ==
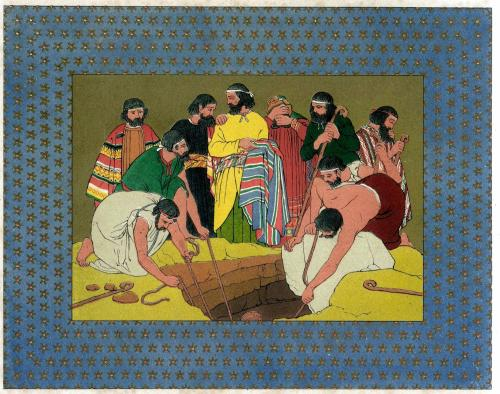
Joseph cast into the pit.

Joseph's father, Jacob (also called Israel), favored him and gave Joseph the coat as a gift; as a result, he was envied by his brothers, who saw the special coat as an indication that Joseph would assume family leadership. His brothers' suspicion grew when Joseph told them of his two dreams (Genesis 37:11) in which all the brothers bowed down to him. The narrative tells that his brothers plotted against him when he was 17, and would have killed him had not the eldest brother Reuben interposed. He persuaded them instead to throw Joseph into a pit and secretly planned to rescue him later. However, while Reuben was absent, the other brothers decided to sell him to a company of Ishmaelite or Midianite merchants. When the passing Midianites arrived, the brothers dragged Joseph up and sold him to the merchants for 20 pieces of silver. The brothers then dipped Joseph's coat in goat blood and showed it to their father, saying that Joseph had been torn apart by a lion.

== Interpretation ==
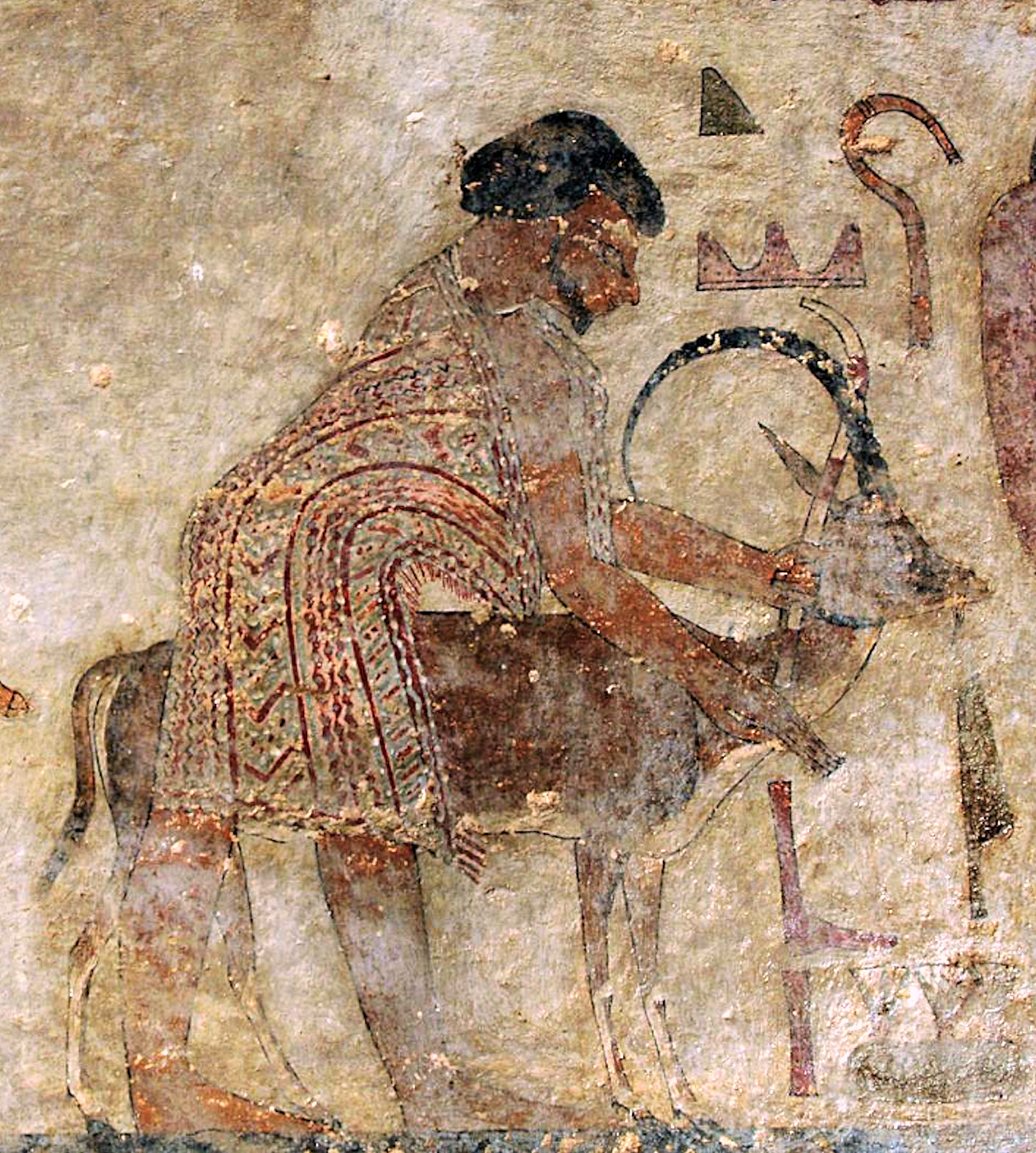
Semitic visitor to Egypt, described as "Abisha the Hyksos" leading a group of Aamu (Ancient Egyptian: ꜥꜣmw "West Asians"), in the painting of a group of foreigners in the Tomb of Khnumhotep II, c. 1900 BC. Howard Vos has suggested that the "coat of many colours" said to have been worn by Joseph could be similar to the colorful foreign garments seen in the painting.

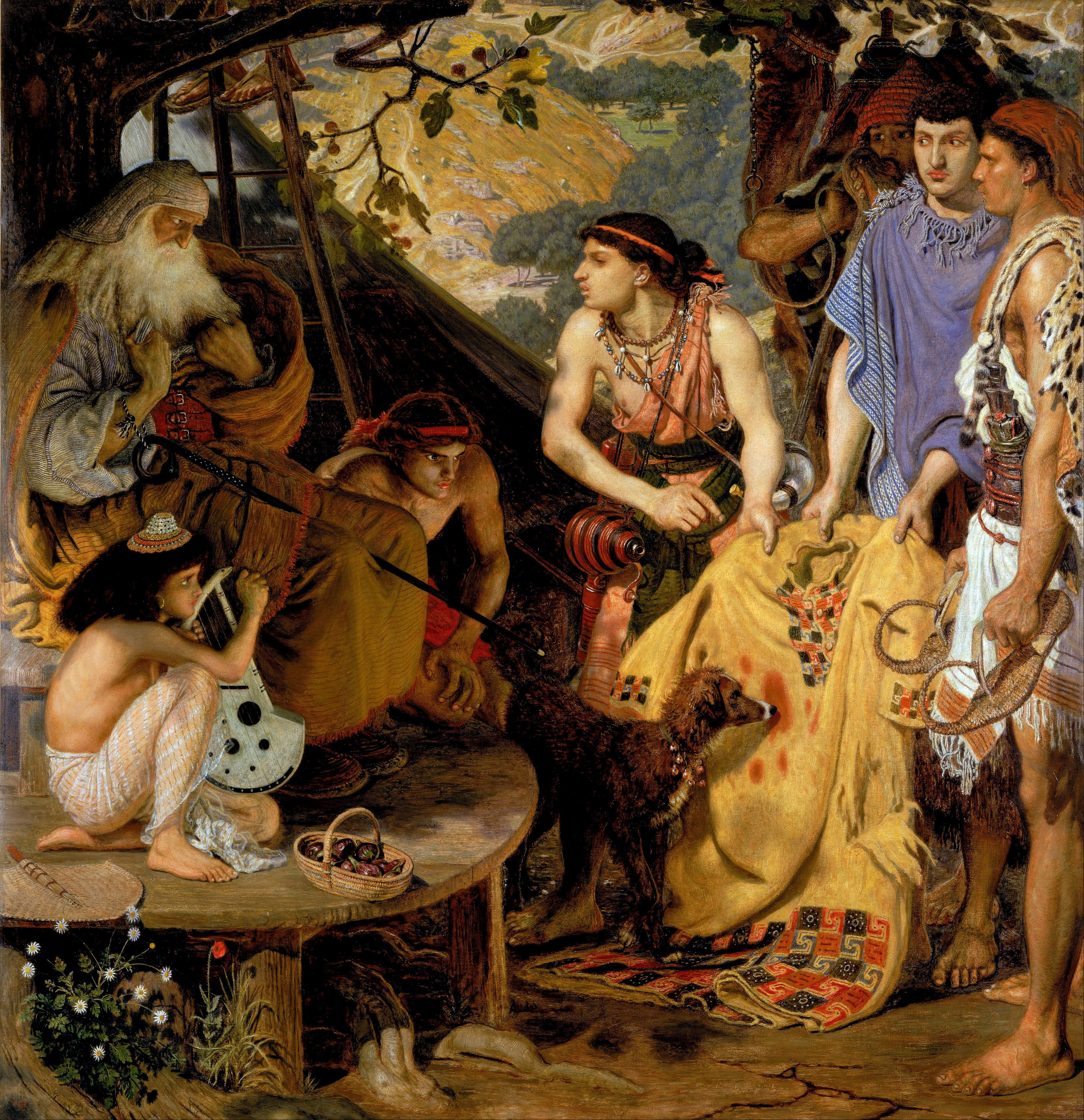
Ford Madox Brown, The Coat of Many Colours; some have suggested that the phrase may merely mean a "coat with long sleeves"

In the King James Version, Genesis 37:3 reads, "Now Israel loved Joseph more than all his children, because he was the son of his old age: and he made him a coat of many colours."

The Septuagint translation of the passage uses the word ποικίλος (poikilos), which indicates "many coloured". The Jewish Publication Society of America Version also employs the phrase "coat of many colours". On the other hand, the Revised Standard Version and the Revised English Bible translate kətonet passim as "a long robe with sleeves", and the New International Version notes the translation difficulties in a footnote and refers to "a richly ornamented robe". This exact phrase is used one other time in the Hebrew Bible, to describe the garment worn by Tamar, daughter of David, in 2 Samuel 13:18–19. However, the garment given to Adam and Eve in Genesis 3.21 is called a kətonet of hide/skin (Hebrew: כׇּתְנ֥וֹת ע֖וֹר, romanized: kətonet ʿor).

The term in the Latin Vulgate, tunicam polymitam, literally means "a tunic of palms". H. E. Ryle states that this means "reaching to the palms of the hands and the soles of the feet, differing from an ordinary tunic by having sleeves, and by reaching to the feet".

Aryeh Kaplan in The Living Torah and Nach gives a range of possible explanations, calling the coat a "royal garment". It notes that passim has been translated as "colorful, embroidered, striped, or with pictures", also suggesting that the word could mean a "long garment" which reaches the hands and feet. Kaplan also acknowledges that the word could discuss the material of the coat, which may have been wool or silk.

James Swanson suggests that the phrase indicates a "tunic or robe unique in design for showing special favour or relationship" and that "either the robe was very long-sleeved and extending to the feet, or a richly-ornamented tunic either of special colour design or gold threading, both ornamental and not suitable for working".

Adrien J. Bledstein states that the kətonet passim was a "flounced garment of woven strips" that was ankle-length, pleated or gathered, and would have been prohibitively expensive to make. This garment is present in ancient artistic representations of gods and high-status humans.

This garb was preceded in earliest depictions by garments made of sheep and goat skins worn by commoners, leaders and deities. Mesopotamian artistic representations of these animal skins make it appear that the fleece or hair was in tiers, the one above overlapping the one below, resembling what we call flouncing. This is very likely what the narrator had in mind for the k‘tonet of skins YHWH made for Adam and Eve in Gen. 3.21.

Recent scholarship, especially among literary critics, has looked at the exhortation to "identify" and the theme of recognition in Genesis 37:32–33:

And they sent the robe of many colors and brought it to their father and said, "This we have found; please identify whether it is your son's robe or not." And he identified it and said, "It is my son's robe. A fierce animal has devoured him. Joseph is without doubt torn to pieces."

Similar wording appears in Genesis 38:25–26, in relation to a signet, cord and staff in the story of Judah and Tamar. This serves to connect the chapters and unify the narrative. Victor Hamilton calls these "intentional literary parallels", while Robert Alter suggests that the verb identify plays "a crucial thematic role in the dénouement of the Joseph story when he confronts his brothers in Egypt, he recognizing them, they failing to recognize him".

== In post-Biblical writing ==
In Thomas Mann's tetralogy Joseph and His Brothers, the Coat of Many Colors acts as a central symbol. Mann was keenly interested in the coat and studied its etymology, referring to it in German with translations that reflect both the many-colored and long-sleeved aspects of the garment, as well as calling it by the untranslated ketonet passim. The coat appears at critical points in all four of the novels, and Mann alters the biblical history to have the coat exist long before Joseph, symbolically tying the garment back to the veil of Ishtar, who appears in the prologue of the narrative. The coat is covered in images which refer back to ancient Mesopotamian myths, contributing to the way in which Mann associates Joseph with characters from other religious traditions such as the Buddha and Hermes.

== Popular culture ==
- Joseph and the Amazing Technicolor Dreamcoat (1968 musical)
- Singer-songwriter Dolly Parton adapts the coat in her song Coat of Many Colors (1971)
- Joseph and the Amazing Technicolor Dreamcoat (1999 musical film)
