= Lee Mead =

British television actor (born 1981)

- Mead performing at Andrew Lloyd Webber's Birthday in the Park, September 2008
- Born: Lee Stephen Mead; 14 July 1981 (age 45); Southend-on-Sea, Essex, England
- Occupations: Actor & Singer
- Years active: 2004–present
- Spouse: Denise van Outen (m. 2009; div. 2015)
- Children: 1
- Musical career
- Genres: Musical theatre, Pop
- Label: Lee Mead Productions Ltd
- Website: Official website

Lee Stephen Mead (born 14 July 1981) is an English musical theatre, television actor and singer, best known for winning the title role in the 2007 West End revival of Joseph and the Amazing Technicolor Dreamcoat through the BBC TV casting show Any Dream Will Do. As well as subsequent West End roles in Wicked, Legally Blonde: The Musical and Sister Act, Mead has pursued a music career, releasing four solo albums and undertaking concert tours in the UK and Japan.

In 2014, he joined the cast of the BBC One drama Casualty, playing the role of Ben 'Lofty' Chiltern, while continuing to tour the UK with his band between filming commitments. He returned to the stage in May 2016 as Caractacus Potts in the UK Tour of Chitty Chitty Bang Bang. In 2017, he returned to the role of Lofty, but in Casualty's sister series, the BBC One drama Holby City.

== Early career ==
After studying at a performing arts college, Mead gained his first professional stage experience in cabaret as a cruise ship singer on the Portsmouth to Bilbao ferry and then in a summer season at Bridlington Spa Theatre. He moved into musical theatre in 2004, playing both Levi and the Pharaoh in the UK touring production of Joseph and the Amazing Technicolor Dreamcoat. Following Joseph, Mead performed in the UK tours of Tommy (ensemble and first cover Tommy) and Miss Saigon (ensemble and first cover Chris) before joining the West End production of Phantom of the Opera as an ensemble player and understudy for the role of Raoul.He struggled to win a lead role and was always cast as the understudy. This led him to audition for Joseph and the Amazing Technicolour Dreamcoat.

== Any Dream Will Do/Joseph and the Amazing Technicolor Dreamcoat ==
While performing in The Phantom of the Opera, Mead auditioned for the BBC series Any Dream Will Do, hoping to win a six-month contract playing Joseph in the 2007 West End revival of Joseph and the Amazing Technicolor Dreamcoat. From 10,000 initial auditionees, Mead was selected as one of the final 12 potential 'Josephs' who performed live on TV every Saturday night to win the public's vote.

Immediately after he won the final, a single featuring Mead, with fellow Any Dream Will Do finalists Lewis Bradley and Keith Jack, was released in aid of the BBC's annual Children In Need charity appeal. The single, featuring Any Dream Will Do (performed by Mead) and Close Every Door (performed by all three finalists) reached number 2 in the official UK singles chart.

Joseph and the Amazing Technicolour Dreamcoat opened in the West End on 17 July 2007 to generally good reviews: "Lee Mead... turns out to be both talented and enthusiastic... what distinguishes him is an attractive singing voice and, coming from beneath hair that owes more to Uncle Esau than father Jacob, lots of affable charisma... last night's audience seemed enchanted" wrote Benedict Nightingale in The Times.

"Mead is in excellent form vocally" wrote The Stage's Lisa Martland. His performance of Close Every Door, "encapsulating both tenderness and defiance", was a highlight for her.

After 600 performances in the role, Mead played Joseph for the last time on 10 January 2009.

== Post-Joseph career ==
Following his run as Joseph in the West End, Mead took a short course at the Lee Strasberg Theatre and Film Institute in New York City before taking on his first major play in a UK tour of Lord Arthur Savile's Crime. The play, which was adapted by Trevor Baxter from a short story by Oscar Wilde, opened at the Theatre Royal Windsor on 12 January 2010 and finished at the Theatre Royal Bath on 24 April 2010. Mead led the cast playing the title role alongside performers such as Gary Wilmot, Kate O'Mara, David Ross and Derren Nesbitt.

Mead went on to appear in the role of Fiyero in the London production of Wicked, from 10 May 2010 to 5 February 2011 opposite Rachel Tucker as Elphaba, the Wicked Witch Of the West and Louise Dearman as Galinda, the Good Witch. Mead was nominated for the Whatsonstage.com Theatregoers' Choice Award for Best Takeover in a Role for this role.

Mead then took over the role of Emmett in Legally Blonde in the West End from 20 June to 8 October 2011. He made his television acting debut in August 2011, guest starring in an episode of Casualty on BBC One as newly employed teaching assistant Harry Timms He also appeared in the second series of the science fiction drama, Bedlam, in the episode entitled "Jude" playing Scott, the brother of the title character, on Sky Living in June 2012. In December 2012, he starred in his first pantomime as the title character "Jack" in Jack and the Beanstalk at the Mayflower Theatre, Southampton alongside Julian Clary and Nigel Havers.

Mead returned to the West End in May 2013, starring in The West End Men in concert at the Vaudeville Theatre alongside Matt Willis, Glenn Carter, Stephen Rahman-Hughes and David Thaxton. In December 2013, he starred in his second pantomime as "Robin" in Robin Hood at the Theatre Royal, Plymouth.

On 1 March 2014, he made his first appearance as Ben "Lofty" Chiltern in the BBC drama series Casualty. Mead was nominated as Favourite Newcomer in the 2014 TV Times Awards and shortlisted as Newcomer in the 2015 National Television Awards for this role. Alongside Casualty, Mead is continuing to tour the UK with his band, starred in his third pantomime as "Prince Charming" in Cinderella at the New Theatre, Cardiff in December 2014 and stars in his fourth as "Aladdin" in Aladdin at the Hippodrome, Birmingham in December 2015.

In 2016, Mead left Casualty to join the Chitty Chitty Bang Bang UK Tour as "Caractacus Potts" and ended the year playing "Prince Charming" in Cinderella at the London Palladium. In 2017 he joined the cast of Holby City, reprising his Casualty role. He remained as a series regular until his final episode aired on 17 December 2019.

In 2019, he made a guest appearance as himself in the second series of the BBC sitcom Motherland.

On 9 November 2019, Mead sang Morning Has Broken at the Annual Remembrance Day celebration service at the Royal Albert Hall.

In 2024, he played the role of Eddie Souther in the West End production of Sister Act. He played the role until March 2025, when he was subsequently cast in the titular role for the UK & Ireland Tour of Barnum for 2026.

== Filmography ==
=== Film and television credits ===
Year	Title	Role
2007	BBC series Any Dream Will Do	Himself
2011	Casualty	Harry Timms
2012	Bedlam	Jude
2014–16	Casualty	Ben 'Lofty' Chiltern
2017–19	Holby City	Ben 'Lofty' Chiltern
2019	Motherland	Lee Mead (himself)
2022	The Dumping Ground	Drew

=== Theatre credits ===
Year	Title	Role	Theatre	Location
2004	Joseph and the Amazing Technicolor Dreamcoat	Ensemble / Understudy Levi & Pharaoh	—N/a	UK National Tour
2005	The Who's Tommy	Ensemble / First Cover Tommy	—N/a	UK National Tour
2006	Miss Saigon	Ensemble / First Cover Chris	—N/a	UK National Tour
2006–07	The Phantom of the Opera	Ensemble / First Cover Raoul	Her Majesty's Theatre	West End
2007–09	Joseph and the Amazing Technicolor Dreamcoat	Joseph	Adelphi Theatre	West End
2010	Lord Arthur Savile's Crime	Arthur Savile	Theatre Royal Bath	Bath
2010–11	Wicked	Fiyero	Apollo Victoria Theatre	West End
2011-12	Legally Blonde	Emmett	Savoy Theatre	West End
2012	Jack & The Beanstalk	Jack	Mayflower Theatre	Southampton
2013	The West End Men	Himself	London Palladium	West End
2013	Robin Hood	Robin	Theatre Royal, Plymouth	Plymouth
2015	Cinderella	Prince Charming	New Theatre	Cardiff
2016	Chitty Chitty Bang Bang	Caractacus Potts	—N/a	UK National Tour
2016-17	Cinderella	Prince Charming	London Palladium	West End
2022–23	Chicago	Billy Flynn	—N/a	UK National Tour
2023	We Will Rock You	Khashoggi	London Coliseum	West End
2024-25	Sister Act	Eddie Souther	Dominion Theatre	West End
2026	Barnum	P.T. Barnum	—N/a	UK National Tour

== Concerts ==
=== UK and Ireland ===
Mead undertook his first solo concert in his home town of Southend in May 2010 and continued to tour the UK and Ireland during 2010 and 2011 with his own band. A second tour, The Love Tour, followed in February 2012 to coincide with the release of his third album, Love Songs. In the summer of 2012, Mead joined forces with Stephen Rahman-Hughes and Matt Rawle to tour as the West End Men, supported by special guest, Kerry Ellis. A further short tour with the West End Men followed in November 2012 with Ramin Karimloo replacing Matt Rawle in the line-up. Mead also starred in a month-long run of the West End Men from May to June 2013 at the Vaudeville Theatre in London.

Mead completed further UK solo tours in the autumn of 2013 and in 2014 then in 2015, announced a new collaboration with Stephen Rahman-Hughes to form duo, Steve and Lee, their show Both Sides Now debuted in October of that year. Mead's new Some Enchanted Evening tour kicked off in July 2015, followed by the launch of his new album of the same name in February 2016, which is marked by a series of intimate London gigs with further UK-wide tour dates announced for March and October 2016. In November 2016, he joined other West End stars for two Broadway in Concert dates and a further Both Sides Now show with Stephen Rahman-Hughes.

Year	Tour	Venues and dates
2010/11	An Evening With Lee Mead	2010 dates: Cliffs Pavilion, Southend-on-Sea (23 May); The Anvil, Basingstoke (13 June); Alban Arena, St Albans (27 June); Embassy Theatre, Skegness (25 July); Grimsby Auditorium, Grimsby (22 August); Opera House, Buxton (12 September); Town Hall, Leeds (17 October); Waterside Theatre, Aylesbury (7 November); New Wimbledon Theatre, London (14 November); Derngate Theatre, Northampton (3 December); Alexandra Theatre, Birmingham (4 December) and Coliseum Theatre, London (19 December). 2011 dates: Mayflower Theatre, Southampton (6 February); Hawth Theatre, Crawley (19 February); Sage, Gateshead (22 February); Royal Concert Hall, Nottingham (23 February); De Montfort Hall, Leicester (25 February); Venue Cymru, Llandudno (27 February); ending in Wales Millennium Centre, Cardiff (12 March). Following the tour, there were further solo concerts in National Concert Hall, Dublin (31 March) with the RTÉ Concert Orchestra; Kilworth House Theatre, Kilworth (16 July); The Forum, Bath (5 November) and Barbican Hall, London (22 December).
2012	The Love Tour	Pavilion Theatre, Bournemouth (11 February); Bridgewater Hall, Manchester (12 February); Cliffs Pavilion, Southend-on-Sea (14 February); St David's Hall, Cardiff (19 February); Colston Hall, Bristol (23 February); Philharmonic Hall, Liverpool (24 February); Symphony Hall, Birmingham (26 February). A further concert, 'An Evening With Lee Mead' was held at the Assembly Hall, Worthing (10 March).
2012/13	West End Men	Fort Regent, Jersey (14 July 2012); G Live, Guildford (18 July 2012); Beau Sejour, Guernsey (28 & 29 July 2012); Royal Concert Hall, Glasgow (14 November 2012); Sage, Gateshead (20 November 2012) and De Montfort Hall, Leicester (23 November 2012) and Vaudeville Theatre, London (25 May – 22 June 2013).
2013/14	Lee Mead in Concert	2013 dates: The Pheasantry, London (14–17 and 19 August); Villa Marina, Isle of Man (23 August); Forum 28, Barrow in Furness (15 September); Shanklin Theatre, Isle of Wight (24 September); The Platform, Morecambe (26 September); Camberley Theatre, Camberley (27 September); Civic Hall, Bedworth (28 September); and Town Hall, Cheltenham (29 September). 2014 dates: Sherman Cymru, Cardiff (4 May); Queen's Theatre, Barnstaple (1 June); Octagon Theatre, Yeovil (29 June); Beck Theatre, Hayes (20 July); The Capitol, Horsham (10 August); G Live, Guildford (13 August); Theatr Hafren, Newtown (20 September); Cliffs Pavilion, Southend (5 October); Aberystwyth Arts Centre, Aberystwyth (2 November); Wycombe Swan Theatre, High Wycombe (12 November); West Cliff Theatre, Clacton (16 November); and Garrick Theatre, London (7 December – Christmas show).
2015	Steve and Lee – Both Sides Now	The Pheasantry, London (31 October – 1 November); The Capitol, Horsham (29 November).
2015/16	Some Enchanted Evening	2015 dates: The Pheasantry, London (26–28 June – warm up gigs); Civic Hall, Bedworth (19 July); Shanklin Theatre, Isle of Wight (2 August); West Cliff Theatre, Clacton (16 August); Camberley Theatre, Camberley (5 September); The Apex, Bury St Edmunds (19 September); Queen's Theatre, Barnstaple (4 October); Octagon Theatre, Yeovil (25 October); Theatre Royal, Winchester (8 November); Lichfield Garrick Theatre, Lichfield (21 November); and Garrick Theatre, London (6 December – Christmas show). 2016 dates: The Pheasantry, London (4–6 March – album launch gigs); The Playhouse, Weston-super-Mare (10 March); Lighthouse Theatre, Kettering (18 March); The Lighthouse, Poole (23 March); Royal Spa Centre, Leamington Spa (2 October); City Varieties Music Hall, Leeds (6 October); Pavilion Theatre, Rhyl (7 October); Marina Theatre, Lowestoft (12 October); Embassy Theatre, Skegness (13 October); Pomegranate Theatre, Chesterfield (14 October); Brewhouse Theatre, Taunton (19 October); Town Hall, Cheltenham (20 October); Oakengates Theatre (The Place), Telford (21 October); New Theatre Royal, Portsmouth (26 October); Assembly Hall Theatre, Tunbridge Wells (27 October) and Cliffs Pavilion, Southend (28 October).
2016	Broadway in Concert	Wales Millennium Centre, Cardiff (16 November); London Palladium, London (17 November).
2016	Steve and Lee – Both Sides Now	Hippodrome Casino, London (27 November).
2017	Up Front and Centre	The Pheasantry, London (26 March, 30 April, 28 May, 25 June, 30 July, 27 August, 24 September, 29 October and 26 November); Princess Alexandra Auditorium, Yarm School Stockton-on-Tees (7 October).
2017	The Glamis Prom	Glamis Castle, Forfar (15 July).
2018	Lee Mead – 10 Years – The Anniversary Tour	Corn Exchange, Newbury (24 February); The Stables, Milton Keynes (25 February); Drill Hall, Lincoln (10 March); The Lowry, Salford Quays (23 March); The Woodville, Gravesend (24 March); The Capitol, Horsham (25 March); Theatre Severn, Shrewsbury (27 April); Lowther Pavilion, Lytham St Anne's (28 April); The Spotlight, Hoddesdon (29 April); Riverfront Arts Centre, Newport (19 May); Festival Theatre, Malvern (20 May); Regal Theatre, Redruth (22 June); Tivoli Theatre, Wimborne Minster (23 June); Royal Hippodrome Theatre, Eastbourne (24 June); The Plaza, Stockport (27 July); Town Hall, Loughborough (28 July); Epsom Playhouse, Epsom (29 July); Medina Theatre, Newport Isle of Wight (28 September); Octagon Theatre, Yeovil (29 September); Theatre Royal, Winchester (30 September); Palace Theatre, Newark-on-Trent (26 October); Castle Theatre, Wellingborough (27 October); Palace Theatre, Redditch (28 October); Corn Exchange, King's Lynn (23 November); West Cliff Theatre, Clacton-on-Sea (24 November); Palace Theatre, Southend-on-Sea (25 November).

=== Japan ===
Mead completed his first international concert tour of Japan in December 2011.

Year	Tour	Venues and dates
2011	Tomomi Nishimoto Christmas Adagio	Mead toured Japan in December 2011 in concert with Sojung Lee also a vocalist. Civic Cultural Centre Muse, Tokorozawa (3 December); Suntory Hall, Minato-ku, Tokyo (4 December); Mihara Performing Arts Centre "Popolo", Hiroshima (6 December); Aichi Prefectural Arts Theatre, Nagoya (8 December); The Symphony Hall, Osaka (9 December); Alpha Anabuki Hall, Kagawa (10 December); Minato Mirai Hall, Yokohama (11 December); Sapporo Concert Hall Kitara, Sapporo (15 December); City Cultural Hall, Aomori (17 December); Opera City Concert Hall, Tokyo (18 December)

== Guest appearances ==
Mead has appeared as a guest artist at a range of concerts and events.

Date	Concert	Notes
1 July 2007	Concert for Diana	Performed at a concert in Wembley Stadium, London in honour of the late Diana, Princess of Wales, singing Any Dream Will Do with other former Josephs Donny Osmond and Jason Donovan.
19 August 2007	Andrew Lloyd Webber Gala	Performed Close Every Door and Any Dream Will Do in a gala concert recorded at the Mermaid Theatre in London for BBC Radio 2.
16 November 2007	Children in Need 2007	Opened the Children in Need 2007 charity event by singing Any Dream Will Do
25 November 2007	Trillogy at the Movies	Performed at charity concert in Southend in aid of Children In Need.
18 March 2008	The Prince's Trust Celebrating Success Awards	Performed Any Dream Will Do and new single You and Me at an awards ceremony held in the Odeon Leicester Square.
21 June 2008	West End Live, London	Performed Close Every Door and Any Dream Will Do at West End Live, a free event held each year in Leicester Square, London to give the public a taster of a range of West End shows.
17 August 2008	Lyrics by Don Black	Performed Some Of Us Belong To The Stars from the musical Billy (based on the novel Billy Liar), and Love Changes Everything from Aspects of Love in a concert at the London Palladium to celebrate the work of lyricist, Don Black.
14 September 2008	Andrew Lloyd Webber 60th Birthday concert.	Performed four songs at Birthday In The Park in Hyde Park, London: Love Changes Everything and All I Ask of You; a duet from The Phantom of the Opera with Hayley Westenra; Close Every Door and Any Dream Will Do.
5 October 2008	Tribute to Ian Fleming	Performed From Russia with Love at a concert in the London Palladium in honour of the creator of James Bond.
29 March 2009	Australia Flood and Fire Benefit	Performed Nothing Else Matters from his second album at the Palace Theatre, London
10 May 2009	Rhydian Roberts Concert	Appeared as a guest star at Rhydian Roberts' concert in the Bristol Hippodrome, singing You Raise Me Up with Rhydian.
17 September 2009	TOG Chorus	Performed a duet of 'We All Stand Together' with Hayley Westenra and two solo numbers at an event organised by Terry Wogan fans in aid of Children In Need at Longleat.
25 October 2009	Helping the Heart of Music	Performed at Royal Albert Hall concert in aid of the PRS for Music Members Benevolent Fund, singing two Marc Bolan songs.
24 November 2008	An Audience with Tim Rice.	Performed six songs at this event in Monaco, including four solos: Any Dream Will Do"; Anthem from the musical Chess; A Winter's Tale;and Heaven on Their Minds from Jesus Christ Superstar as well as two duets, Can You Feel The Love Tonight and A Whole New World with Emma Munro-Wilson.
10 December 2009	Spirit of Christmas	Headlined concert at Lincoln Cathedral in aid of the Muscular Dystrophy campaign.
21 December 2009	Christmas with Hayley Westenra	Performed two solo numbers and two duets with Hayley Westenra, including their first live performance of 'When the Stars Go Blue' from Mead's second album, at the Barbican Centre.
3 October 2010	A Handful Of Songs: A Tribute to Lionel Bart	Performed at a BBC Radio 2 'Friday Night Is Music Night' concert at the Hackney Empire, singing two songs, 'From Russia With Love' and 'Do You Mind' by Lionel Bart. Broadcast 24 December 2010.
10 October 2010	Apollo Victoria's 80th Birthday Concert	Performed at concert celebrating the Apollo Victoria's 80-year history, singing 'Paint It Black' by The Rolling Stones, who performed there in 1961.
4 March 2011	Daniel Boys cabaret	Joined Boys to sing duet version of 'More Than Words' from Mead's second album.
18 June 2011	West End Live, London	Made his debut as Emmett from Legally Blonde: The Musical at West End Live 2011, a free annual event showcasing the best of London theatre, performing 'Chip On My Shoulder' with Carley Stenson as Elle
28 June 2012	Top That! A Tribute to Irving Berlin, Watford	Performed at a BBC Radio 2 'Friday Night Is Music Night' concert devoted to the songs of Irving Berlin at the Watford Colosseum. Broadcast 7 September 2012.
6 July 2012	Olympic Torch Relay Event	Performed a new song, 'Gold' especially composed for the occasion at Sparks Will Fly, an Olympic Torch Relay event in Chelmsford.
25 November 2013	The Salvation Army Christmas Concert	Performed 'Bring Him Home' and 'Blue Christmas' at this annual Christmas Concert at the Royal Albert Hall, London.
29 March 2014	Stephen Rahman-Hughes cabaret	Sang 'Father and Son' and two duets with Rahman-Hughes, 'Luck Be a Lady' and 'I Believe (When I Fall In Love)'.
5 April 2014	ISS Choral Spectacular	Guest at The Salvation Army International Staff Songsters Choral Spectacular at Regent Hall, London.
11 July 2014	Stephen Rahman-Hughes cabaret	Sang three numbers at The Pheasantry, London.
28 August 2014	Daniel Boys cabaret	Mead joined Boys in an unusual all-male duet of 'As Long as You're Mine' from Wicked.
12 October 2014	Gala Spectacular	Performed three songs at Bobby Davro's charity concert in aid of Woking & Sam Beare Hospices at the New Victoria Theatre, Woking.
10 May 2015	Let's Hear It for the Boys	Performed at charity concert hosted by Louise Dearman in aid of Alzheimer's Society.
7 June 2015	In Harmony with your Gut	Performed at charity concert in aid of Crohn's and Colitis UK and the St Mark's Hospital Foundation at St Paul's, Covent Garden, London.
18 October 2015	Brian McCann 40..15! Cabaret	Mead joined an impressive line-up of West End talent to sing at this cabaret at The Phoenix Artist Club, London.
8 December 2015	Christmas with the Stars	Performed two songs at the annual charity concert in aid of Bloodwise at the Royal Albert Hall, London.
25 February 2016	Music of the Movies	Performed a number of songs from his new album, released the same day, and Pure Imagination accompanied by a massed children's choir at this annual event in aid of youth charity Hybu at the Motorpoint Arena, Cardiff.
30 June 2017	Don't Stop Us Now!	Co-hosted and performed three songs at this 10th anniversary event in aid of youth charity Hybu at the Motorpoint Arena, Cardiff.
3 September 2017	Sennybridge Show Concert	Joins Rhydian and others to perform at the annual Sennybridge Show Concert at Sennybridge, Brecon (3 September).

== Discography ==
=== Albums ===
Year	Album title	Notes
1 October 2007	Joseph and The Amazing Technicolour Dreamcoat	Mead's version of Any Dream Will Do was added to a special edition re-release of the 1991 London Palladium cast recording.
19 November 2007	Lee Mead	Mead's debut solo album achieved double gold status.
5 May 2008	Three and Out	Mead features on two songs on the Three and Out soundtrack, You've Got A Friend and Somebody Help Me.
6 October 2008	Andrew Lloyd Webber 60	Mead's version of Any Dream Will Do features on this triple CD album of the best of Andrew Lloyd Webber.
23 February 2009	Connie Fisher – Secret Love	Mead duets with Connie Fisher, winner of How Do You Solve A Problem Like Maria?, singing Next Time You Fall In Love from the musical Starlight Express.
9 March 2009	Nothing Else Matters	Mead's second solo album includes a mixture of covers and new songs, including some co-writes, and a duet of When The Stars Go Blue with Hayley Westenra.
9 November 2009	Bandaged Together	Mead appears on this double album, duetting with Hayley Westenra and the TOGS Chorus on We All Stand Together as well as singing All You Need Is Love. This charity album consists of a mixture of nostalgic and children's songs from years gone by.
13 February 2012	Love Songs	Mead's third solo album is, as the cover states, dedicated to different Love Songs. It includes moving covers of Falling Slowly, Hallelujah, Fix You and She.
26 February 2016	Some Enchanted Evening	Mead's fourth solo album harks back to the golden age of the Hollywood film musicals. Tracks include Luck Be a Lady, Singin' in the Rain and the title track Some Enchanted Evening.
15 May 2017	Rachel Tucker – On The Road	Mead duets with West End and Broadway star Rachel Tucker, singing You Matter To Me from the musical Waitress.
26 June 2017	Keith Jack – Movie Nights	Mead duets with Keith Jack, runner-up to Mead in the Any Dream Will Do TV series, singing You've Got A Friend In Me from the film Toy Story.
4 October 2017	Dan Burton – Broadway Melodies	Mead duets with West End triple threat Dan Burton, singing Cole Porter's Well, Did You Evah! from the film High Society.
23 February 2018	Lee Mead – 10 Years	Mead's fifth album celebrates the 10 years since his first West End lead role in Joseph and the Amazing Technicolor Dreamcoat and features 12 of his favourite songs from the musical theatre shows he has been in and from his own concerts.

=== Singles ===
Year	Single title
18 June 2007	Any Dream Will Do #2 single.
3 December 2007	Gonna Make You A Star
10 March 2008	You And Me
7 November 2009	We Will Remember Them (Help For Heroes)
9 November 2009	All You Need Is Love (Children In Need)
14 December 2020	In My Arms For Christmas

== Awards ==
Year	Award
19 September 2007	Rear of the Year accolade.
16 October 2007	lastminute.com People's Choice Theatre Award for Favourite Theatre Actor.
18 November 2007	Variety Club Award for "Outstanding New Talent."
8 December 2007	TV Times award for "Favourite Newcomer"
15 April 2008	Gold disc for debut album "Lee Mead."

== Personal life ==
Mead was born in Southend-on-Sea to Joan (née Horning) and Stephen Mead. He has a younger brother, Casey Michael Mead, who is four years his junior.

In November 2007, Mead dumped Kerry, his long-term girlfriend and began dating Any Dream Will Do judge Denise van Outen. The couple married on 25 April 2009 and their daughter was born on 1 May 2010. In July 2013, the couple released a joint statement stating that they had separated.

In February 2023, Mead announced his engagement to girlfriend Issy Szumniak.

=== Charity ===
Mead is the patron and active supporter of Equal People Performing Arts, a charity based in Rayleigh, Essex that makes the performing arts available to all, and brings together disabled and non-disabled children and young adults to socialise and perform.

He also was ambassador of Vodafone's 2008 Cut It Out Campaign in 2008 which aimed to reduce bullying. The campaign worked alongside the West End stage production of Joseph and the Amazing Technicolor Dreamcoat. Children were invited to design their own 'dreamcoat' and the winning entries were then worn on stage by Mead during Anti-Bullying week.
