= LW Entertainment =

English media company

LW Entertainment Ltd.
- Formerly: Really Useful Group Ltd. (1977–2025)
- Type: Private company
- Industry: Media
- Genre: Theatre; Film; Television; Video; Concert productions; Merchandising; Magazine publishing; Records; Music publishing
- Founded: 1977
- Founder: Andrew Lloyd Webber
- Headquarters: London, England; Sydney, Australia
- Key people: Andrew Lloyd Webber (Chairman)
- Owner: Andrew Lloyd Webber
- Divisions: See below
- Website: lwentertainment.com

LW Entertainment Ltd. (formerly the Really Useful Group Ltd. (RUG)) is an international company set up in 1977 by Andrew Lloyd Webber. It is involved in theatre, film, television, video and concert productions, merchandising, magazine publishing, records and music publishing. The company's original name is inspired by a phrase from the children's book series The Railway Series (which also inspired Webber to create Starlight Express) in which Thomas the Tank Engine and the other engines are referred to as "Really Useful Engines".

== History ==
The company was set up in 1977 when Lloyd Webber, frustrated with the terms of his contract with the impresario Robert Stigwood, decided to take greater control over the management of his creative works. All Lloyd Webber compositions and productions created from that point have been owned by the company.

The Really Useful Group was floated on the stock market in 1986. Four years later, Lloyd Webber took it back into private ownership, selling 30% to film and music group PolyGram to fund the cost of buying back shares. In 1995, PolyGram was bought by Canadian conglomerate Seagram, with the Really Useful stake being passed to its own film and music subsidiary, Universal. In 1999, Lloyd Webber paid $US75 million for Universal's 30% stake, giving the composer 100% ownership of the group.

The Really Useful Group was rebranded as LW Entertainment in August 2025.

== Divisions ==
=== Really Useful Theatre Company ===
Really Useful Group logo used until 2025.

The Really Useful Theatre Company produces and manages plays and musicals, mainly, but not limited to those written by Lloyd Webber. It is also responsible for licensing its productions worldwide. In the 1990s, RUT mainly produced shows on its own, but more recently has again developed partnerships with other producers and production companies, notably Bill Kenwright, to produce its works, as it had done in the 1980s with Cameron Mackintosh.

Among its productions and co-productions are:

- Joseph and the Amazing Technicolor Dreamcoat – Lloyd Webber/Tim Rice – London, Broadway, Los Angeles, worldwide
- Jesus Christ Superstar – Lloyd Webber/Rice – London, Broadway, worldwide
- Evita – Lloyd Webber/Rice – London, Broadway, worldwide
- Tell Me on a Sunday – Lloyd Webber/Don Black – London, UK tour
- Cats – Lloyd Webber/T. S. Eliot – London, Broadway, worldwide
- Starlight Express – Lloyd Webber/Richard Stilgoe – London, Broadway, worldwide
- Song and Dance – Lloyd Webber/Black – London, Broadway
- The Phantom of the Opera – Lloyd Webber/Charles Hart/Stilgoe – London, Broadway, worldwide
- Aspects of Love – Lloyd Webber/Black & Hart – London, Broadway, 2007 UK tour
- By Jeeves – Lloyd Webber/Alan Ayckbourn – London, Broadway
- Whistle Down the Wind – Lloyd Webber/Jim Steinman – Washington, D.C., London, UK tours
- The Beautiful Game – Lloyd Webber/Ben Elton – London
- The Woman in White – Lloyd Webber/David Zippel – London, Broadway
- Bombay Dreams – Rahman/Black – London, Broadway
- The Sound of Music – Richard Rodgers/Oscar Hammerstein II – 2006 London Palladium production
- Priscilla, Queen of the Desert – The Musical; Various; London 2009
- Love Never Dies; Lloyd Webber/Elton/Glenn Slater; London 2010
- The Wizard of Oz; London 2010
- Daisy Pulls it Off – Denise Deegan – London
- The Hired Man – Howard Goodall/Melvyn Bragg – London
- Lend Me a Tenor – Ken Ludwig – London, Broadway
- La Bête – David Hirson – Broadway, London
- School of Rock; Broadway 2015

In 2016, Really Useful partnered with Concord Theatricals to act as representative for licensing its works in North America. In October 2021, the groups extended the partnership through 2025.

=== Really Useful Films ===
Really Useful Films logo

Really Useful Films is responsible for the production of film versions of Lloyd Webber's catalogue. Initially, these had consisted of lower budget straight-to-video versions of the shows (Cats, Joseph, Jesus Christ Superstar, and By Jeeves), but in 2004 Really Useful Films completed the film The Phantom of the Opera, directed by Joel Schumacher and starring Gerard Butler and Emmy Rossum, which was nominated for three Academy Awards and three Golden Globes.

It has also released DVD and video versions of Lloyd Webber's 50th birthday concert at the Royal Albert Hall, the 2001 Masterpiece – Andrew Lloyd Webber in China concert and a musical version of The Gruffalo.

The film director Nick Morris is regularly involved with the films division.

=== Really Useful Records ===
Really Useful Records produces cast albums of Lloyd Webber musicals. From 1986 until Lloyd Webber regained full control of the company in 1999, Really Useful Records had an exclusive deal with PolyGram to release albums through its Polydor label. Really Useful continues to release its albums and DVDs through Universal, current owners of PolyGram. Aside from cast albums, Lloyd Webber has also produced albums for Marti Webb, Sarah Brightman, Connie Fisher, Andrea Ross and Michael Ball via the label.

Lee Mead, who won the lead role in 2007's West End revival of Lloyd Webber and Tim Rice's Joseph and the Amazing Technicolour Dreamcoat by taking part in BBC One's Any Dream Will Do! recorded a single of the song "Any Dream Will Do". The contest's third-placed Lewis Bradley and second-placed Keith Jack joined him on "Close Every Door To Me". Really Useful Records released the double-A side single to raise funds for the BBC's annual Children in Need charity appeal.

=== LW Theatres ===
LW Theatres owns and manages six West End theatres:

1. Adelphi Theatre (in association with the Nederlander Organization)
2. Cambridge Theatre
3. Gillian Lynne Theatre
4. His Majesty's Theatre
5. London Palladium
6. Theatre Royal, Drury Lane

The group also included the off West End venue The Other Palace, formerly known as the St James Theatre which it sold to Bill Kenwright in October 2021. The theatre reopened under its new owner following a closure caused by the coronavirus pandemic with a revival of the musical Heathers.

Lloyd Webber purchased the Palace Theatre in 1983, followed by the New London (now Gillian Lynne) and the Adelphi. In 1999, Lloyd Webber and NatWest Equity Partners bought the Stoll Moss group, owner of 10 London theatres, including the London Palladium and the Theatre Royal, Drury Lane, for £85 million from Australian businesswoman Janet Holmes à Court, and formed Really Useful Theatres.

In 2004, operational control of the Queen's Theatre reverted from Really Useful Theatres back to Cameron Mackintosh's Delfont Mackintosh Theatres. The transfer of operational control of the adjoining Gielgud Theatre from Really Useful Theatres to Delfont Mackintosh Theatres followed two years later. On 11 July 2005, the company sold four theatres (the Apollo, the Duchess, the Lyric, and the Garrick) to Nimax Theatres Ltd, a company owned by Broadway producer Max Weitzenhoffer, who previously had been a rival bidder for the Stoll Moss theatres, and Nica Burns, production director of Really Useful Theatres. Lloyd Webber invested £10 million of the proceeds from the sales in October 2005 to buy the interest of his partner Bridgepoint (formerly NatWest Equity Partners), and renamed the group Really Useful Theatres Group. Nimax purchased The Palace in 2012. In 2014, the group split into two companies, and the owner of the theatres was named Really Useful Theatres. In 2018, Really Useful Theatres changed its name to LW Theatres to avoid confusion with the other companies owned by Lloyd Webber.

=== Really Useful Magazines ===
The company formed Really Useful Magazines Ltd to distribute Theatregoer magazine, a monthly magazine edited and published on the Really Useful Group's behalf by the publishing agency Axon Publishing. Published beginning in 2000, the magazine was available in conjunction with the programmes in all Really Useful Theatres. Really Useful sold Theatregoer magazine to Bandwidth Communications, the publisher of Whatsonstage.com, in April 2005.

=== Other interests ===
The Really Useful Group has, in the past, set up sub-labels to cater for pop and dance acts, such as Carpet Records, featuring Timmy Mallett's Bombalurina ("Itsy Bitsy Teeny Weeny Yellow Polka Dot Bikini") and Doctor Spin ("Tetris"); and ‘’It Records’’, home to My Life Story in the late 1990s. The name Carpet Records was a play on the acronym RUG, of the Really Useful Group.

=== Charitable donation ===
The group on 27 June 2007 announced that it would donate all receipts from two special performances of a revived West End production of Joseph and the Amazing Technicolor Dreamcoat to the BBC's Children in Need charity appeal, which would benefit from ticket sales for 16 July's preview and performance of 16 November, on the night of the annual Children in Need telethon. Viewers of a BBC One television show, Any Dream Will Do! had voted 25-year-old West End ensemble player and understudy Lee Mead to take role of Joseph in the production. During the contest's 9 June 2007 final, host Graham Norton said that Children in Need had benefited by more than £500,000 in income from viewer voting on premium-rate telephone lines.

== See also ==
- List of record labels
