= Susan Rose =

Susan Rose may refer to:

- Susan Rose (EastEnders), soap opera character
- Susan Rose (producer) (born 1957), American theatrical and film producer
- Susan Porter Rose, American political aide and administrator
- Sue Rose, American cartoonist, animator, voice actress and television writer
