= Maria Friedman =

British actress and director (born 1960)

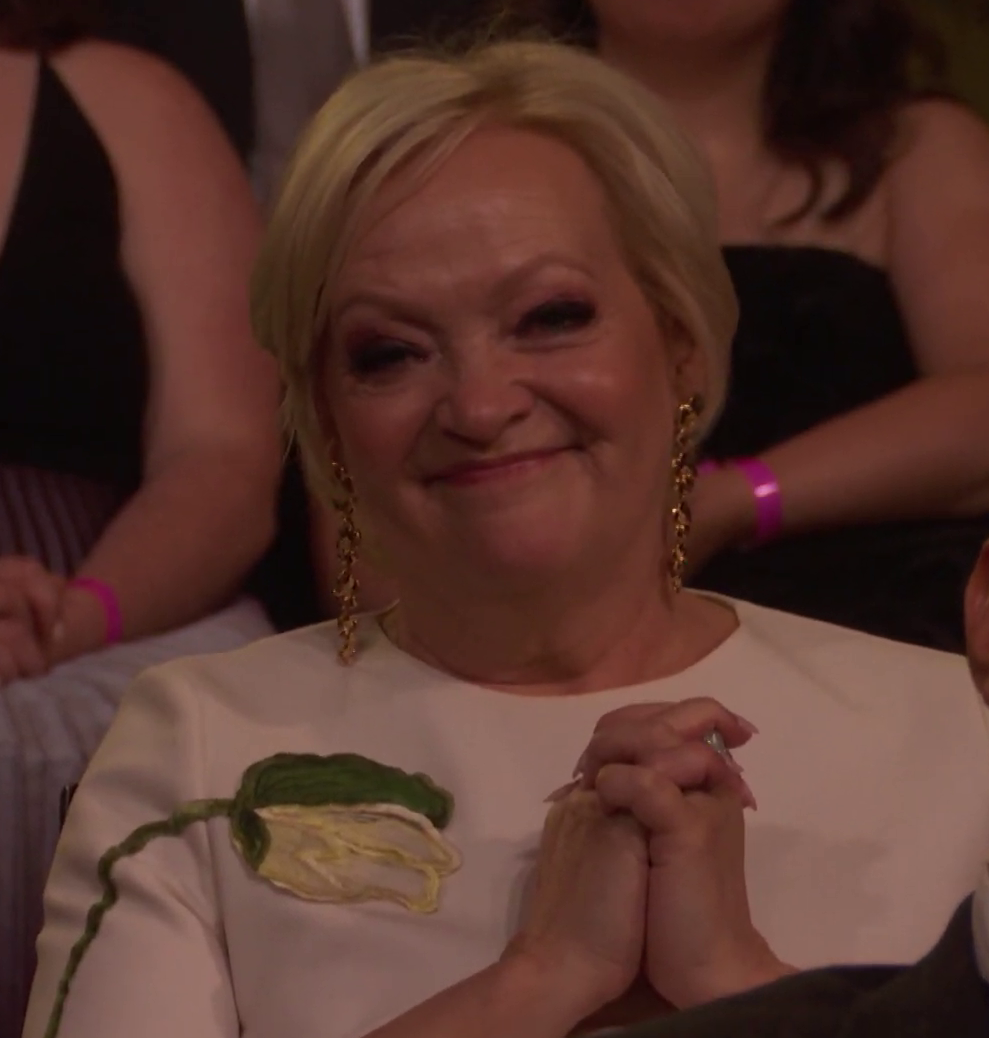
- Maria Friedman during the 2024 Tony Awards
- Born: Maria Freedman; 19 March 1960 (age 66); Switzerland
- Occupation: Actress
- Years active: 1980–present
- Spouse(s): Roland Brine (divorced); Adrian Der Gregorian (2006–present)
- Partner(s): Jeremy Sams; Oleg Poupko
- Children: 2
- Relatives: Sonia Friedman (sister)

Maria Friedman (née Freedman; born 19 March 1960) is a British actress and director, best known for her work in musical theatre.

She is a seven-time Laurence Olivier Award nominee, winning three times for acting. Her first win was for her 1994 one-woman show, By Special Arrangement. She twice won as Best Actress in a Musical—for Fosca in the original London production of Passion (1997), and for Mother in the original London production of Ragtime (2004).

Friedman played the narrator in the 1999 straight to video version of Joseph and the Amazing Technicolor Dreamcoat.

She played Elaine Peacock in the British television series EastEnders from 2014 to 2017. In 2023 the role was recast with Harriet Thorpe taking over as Elaine.

Friedman directed the 2013 West End revival of Stephen Sondheim's Merrily We Roll Along, which won the 2014 Laurence Olivier Award for Best Musical Revival.

She directed the 2023 Broadway revival of Merrily We Roll Along, which won the 2024 Tony Award for Best Revival of a Musical, the 2024 Drama League Award for Outstanding Revival of a Musical, and a 2024 Special Citation from the New York Drama Critics Circle.

== Early life ==
Maria Friedman was born in Switzerland, the second of the four children of Clair Llewelyn (née Sims), a concert pianist, and Leonard Friedman (né Freedman), a classical violinist and member of the Royal Philharmonic Orchestra. Her father was from a Russian-Jewish immigrant family, while her mother is English. Her family moved to Germany, where she began her education, but her parents soon divorced, and her mother returned to England with the children. Her elder brother was the late classical violinist Richard Friedman. Her younger sisters are the theatre director and producer Sonia Friedman, and Dr. Sarah Beecham, an academic researcher at the University of Limerick, Ireland.

== Career ==
In 1989, she appeared in the lead female role of Hayyah in the play Ghetto by Joshua Sobol at the Olivier Theatre in London. In the following year she appeared in another Royal National Theatre production as Dot in Sunday in the Park with George by Stephen Sondheim.

She won an Olivier Award for her one-woman cabaret Maria Friedman By Special Arrangement and another Olivier Award (Best Actress in a Musical) in 1997 for starring in Sondheim's Passion. She appeared in Passion in the West End at the Queen's Theatre in 1996 as Fosca. She starred in Chicago in the West End at the Adelphi Theatre as Roxie starting in 1998.

In the 1999 film of Andrew Lloyd Webber's Joseph and the Amazing Technicolor Dreamcoat, she played the narrator. She played the role of Mother in the West End production of Ragtime at the Piccadilly Theatre starting in March 2003, winning the 2004 Olivier Award, Best Actress in a Musical.

In 2004, she originated the role of Marian Halcombe in Lloyd Webber's musical The Woman in White in the West End and on Broadway in 2005. As previews for The Woman in White started for the Broadway production, she was diagnosed with stage 1 breast cancer and left the show to have surgery to have the lump removed. Less than a week after the surgery she returned to the stage for the previews and performed on the official opening night. She said she would begin radiation treatment for the cancer in December 2005. The Broadway production closed after only 109 performances on 22 February 2006, in part due to her and co-star Michael Ball's frequent absences due to illness. (Friedman had planned a six-week absence for further treatment, with Judy Kuhn to be her replacement, but remained for the duration of the run once the closing was announced.)

As well as other musical shows, Friedman participated in Hey, Mr. Producer!, the concert celebrating the works of Sir Cameron Mackintosh, in which she sang "You Could Drive a Person Crazy," "Broadway Baby," and "How Many Tears?" Similarly, she participated in Sondheim Tonight live at London's Barbican Centre, singing "Losing My Mind" (from Follies) and "More" (from the film Dick Tracy). She has also had several one woman shows: Maria Friedman – By Special Arrangement and Maria Friedman – By Extra Special Arrangement and has performed these in several top cabaret venues in both the UK (most recently at Trafalgar Studios) and New York City, including several engagements at the Café Carlyle. She can be heard on many cast recordings; and has released several solo albums including Maria Friedman, Maria Friedman Live, Now and Then, and Maria Friedman Celebrates The Great British Songbook. Friedman has won three Laurence Olivier Awards and been nominated for seven.

In July 2007, Friedman sang the role of Mrs. Lovett in four performances of a concert version of Sweeney Todd opposite Bryn Terfel at London's Royal Festival Hall. In 2010, she appeared as a soloist in the BBC Proms tribute to Stephen Sondheim at the Royal Albert Hall, London. In October 2014, Friedman joined the cast of EastEnders as Elaine Peacock, the mother of established character Linda Carter (Kellie Bright). She has since appeared in December 2014 and February to March 2015 to date, before returning for a three-month stint in September 2015.

=== Directing ===
Friedman appeared as Mary Flynn in a production of Sondheim's Merrily We Roll Along at the Haymarket Theatre, Leicester in 1992. Twenty years later, she directed a revival of the musical, which started at the Menier Chocolate Factory in November 2012, and transferred to the West End at the Harold Pinter Theatre in April to July 2013. This won the 2014 Laurence Olivier Award for Best Musical Revival.

Friedman subsequently directed a production of Merrily We Roll Along at the Huntington Theatre Company in Boston, Massachusetts, which opened in September 2017. She directed an off-Broadway production based on her Menier Chocolate Factory staging that premiered at the New York Theatre Workshop in 2022, and transferred to Broadway at the Hudson Theatre the following year. For this she was nominated for a 2024 Tony Award for Best Direction of a Musical. The Broadway revival of Merrily We Roll Along was nominated for six other Tony Awards and won four: Best Revival of a Musical, Best Actor in a Musical (Jonathan Groff), Best Featured actor in a Musical (Daniel Radcliffe), and Best Orchestrations (Jonathan Tunick). She directed the filmed version of the musical, which was released in December 2025.

Friedman has directed other musicals. In 2015, she directed a revival of High Society at The Old Vic Theatre. The production was played in the round. She directed a revival of Stepping Out in the West End at the Vaudeville Theatre in 2017. In November 2026, she will direct a new chamber production of My Fair Lady at Pitlochry Festival Theatre starring Alan Cumming as Henry Higgins (as part of his inaugural season as Artistic Director).

== Personal life ==
Friedman married dancer Roland Brine in 1985; the couple divorced in 2002. She married actor Adrian Der Gregorian in 2006. She has two sons: Toby Sams-Friedman (b. 1994), an actor, with director and writer Jeremy Sams; and Alfred Friedman (b. 2002), also an actor, with cameraman Oleg Poupko.

== Filmography ==
- Red Dwarf (1989) - Waitress
- Heil Honey I'm Home! (1990) - Eva Braun
- Casualty (1991–92) - Patricia Baynes
- Hey, Mr. Producer! (1998) - Performer
- Joseph and the Amazing Technicolor Dreamcoat (1999) - The Narrator
- EastEnders (2014–17) - Elaine Peacock
- The Sound of Music Live (2015) - Mother Abbess (UK version of The Sound of Music Live!)
- Tinsel Town (2025) - Brenda

== Stage ==
=== As performer ===
- Blues in the Night (1987) - Girl with a Date
- Ghetto (1989) - Hayyah
- Sunday in the Park with George (1990) - Dot/Marie
- Square Rounds (1992) - Munitionette; Clara Haber
- Merrily We Roll Along (1992) - Mary Flynn (Haymarket Theatre, Leicester)
- By Special Arrangement (1994) - Herself
- April in Paris (1994) - Bet
- By Extra Special Arrangement (1995) - Herself
- The Break of Day (1995) (Royal Court) - Nina
- Passion (1996) - Fosca
- Lady in the Dark (1997) - Liza Elliot
- Chicago (1998) - Roxie Hart
- The Witches of Eastwick (2000) - Sukie
- Ragtime (2003) - Mother
- The Woman in White (2005) - Marian
- Sweeney Todd: The Demon Barber of Fleet Street (2007) - Mrs. Lovett
- The King and I (2009) (Royal Albert Hall) - Anna Leonowens
- Fiddler on the Roof (2019) - Golde
- Kimberly Akimbo (2026) - Kimberly Levaco

=== As director ===
- High Society (2012 The Old Vic)
- Merrily We Roll Along (2012–13 Menier Chocolate Factory, Harold Pinter Theatre, 2017 Huntington Theatre Company, 2022–24 New York Theatre Workshop and Hudson Theatre)
- Stepping Out (2016-17 UK tour and Vaudeville Theatre)
- My Fair Lady (2026 Pitlochry Festival Theatre)

== Awards and nominations ==
Year	Award	Category	Work	Result
1991	Laurence Olivier Award	Best Actress in a Musical	Sunday in the Park with George	Nominated
1995	Laurence Olivier Award	Best Entertainment	By Special Arrangement	Won
1997	Laurence Olivier Award	Best Actress in a Musical	Passion	Won
1998	Laurence Olivier Award	Best Actress in a Musical	Lady in the Dark	Nominated
1999	Laurence Olivier Award	Best Actress in a Musical	Chicago	Nominated
2004	Laurence Olivier Award	Best Actress in a Musical	Ragtime	Won
2005	Laurence Olivier Award	Best Actress in a Musical	The Woman in White	Nominated
2006	Theatre World Award		The Woman in White	Honoree
2009	Laurence Olivier Award	Best Entertainment	Maria Friedman: Rearranged	Nominated
2014	Laurence Olivier Award	Best Director	Merrily We Roll Along	Nominated
2023	Drama Desk Awards	Outstanding Director of a Musical	Merrily We Roll Along	Nominated
2023	Outer Critics Circle Awards	Best Director	Merrily We Roll Along	Nominated
2024	Tony Awards	Best Direction of a Musical	Merrily We Roll Along	Nominated
2024	Drama League Awards	Outstanding Director of a Musical	Merrily We Roll Along	Won
2025	Grammy Awards	Best Musical Theater Album	Merrily We Roll Along	Nominated
