= F. Hinds =

British jewellery retail chain

- Type: Private
- Industry: Retail
- Founded: London (1856; 170 years ago)
- Founder: George Henry Hinds
- Headquarters: Uxbridge, England
- Area served: England and Wales
- Key people: Frank Hinds; William Hinds
- Products: Jewellery
- Number of employees: Approx. 1,000
- Website: fhinds.co.uk

F. Hinds is a jewellery retailing chain, operating in England and Wales. There are currently 116 F. Hinds stores within the United Kingdom.

== History ==
=== Beginnings (1856–1990) ===
The chain is an independent retailer which was founded in 1856 by George Henry Hinds, although his father Joseph was also a clockmaker in Stamford, Lincolnshire and his great uncle was also a Stamford clockmaker in the early years of the 1800s.

Shortly after the First World War, brothers Frank and William divided the business in two. William Hinds diversified into theatres and also into films as he was one of the two founders of Hammer Film Productions. Frank continued with the jewellery business and eventually, in 1990, F. Hinds took over the one remaining shop owned by the other half of the family in Worthing, Sussex.

Brands operated by F. Hinds include My Diamonds diamond jewellery, the Aureus gold on sterling silver jewellery collection and the Kilimanjaro Tanzanite collection.

=== Opening of online store (1997–2005) ===
The chain was one of the first click and mortar jewellers, having launched its first e-commerce site in 1997.

The shops provide a design and repair service and also specialise in recycling unwanted gold jewellery into new pieces.

=== RJC Certification (2008–2018) ===
In 2008, F Hinds joined the Responsible Jewellery Council, the international not-for-profit organisation established to reinforce consumer confidence in the jewellery industry by advancing responsible business practices throughout the supply chain, and in August 2011 they were one of the first members to become fully accredited following an independent audit.

In 2014 Andrew Hinds was elected Chairman of the UK jewellery trade body the National Association of Goldsmiths. It later merged with the British Jewellers' Association and became the National Association of Jewellers. Hinds remained on the National Committee of the National Association of Jewellers until the end of his term in June 2020.

=== Acquisition of Chapelle Jewellery (2019-present) ===
In 2019, Hinds Ltd purchased the UK's leading outlet centre specialist, Chapelle. Chapelle had traded successfully for several decades but had struggled under Hilco which lead to its eventual administration; however, Hinds saved 12 of the stores. The outlet centre stores and website www.chapelle.co.uk continue to operate under the Chapelle brand name. In March 2022, the first new Chapelle store under F Hinds' ownership opened in the Designer Outlet West Midlands, Cannock.
