= Joseph and the Amazing Technicolor Dreamcoat (film) =

- Directed by: David Mallet; Steven Pimlott
- Written by: Tim Rice; Michael Walsh
- Screenplay by: Michael Walsh
- Produced by: Andrew Lloyd Webber; Andy Picheta; Nigel Wright; Austin Shaw
- Starring: Donny Osmond; Maria Friedman; Richard Attenborough; Joan Collins
- Cinematography: Nicholas D. Knowland
- Music by: Tim Rice (lyrics); Andrew Lloyd Webber (music)
- Production companies: Really Useful Films; Universal Pictures Visual Programming
- Distributed by: Universal Studios Home Video
- Release date: March 28, 2000
- Running time: 1 hour 16 minutes
- Country: United Kingdom
- Language: English

Joseph and the Amazing Technicolor Dreamcoat is a 1999 British musical comedy drama. It is an adaptation of the 1972 Andrew Lloyd Webber musical of the same name. It is a sung-through musical film on PolyGram Visual Programming Home Entertainment.

== Plot ==
The film depicts Joseph and the Amazing Technicolor Dreamcoat being performed to a primary school assembly hall, where the children become the chorus of the musical while the teachers and staff become its characters.

The audience are introduced to Jacob and his twelve sons. Jacob favours his second-youngest Joseph, which he shows by giving him a coat of many colours. The jealousy of Joseph's brothers is only increased by Joseph's interpretation of his own dreams that he is destined to rule over them. They try to kill Joseph by dumping him in a pit of cobras, but decide to sell him into slavery instead. They smear his coat in goat's blood and tell Jacob that Joseph is dead. Meanwhile, Joseph is purchased by millionaire Potiphar in Egypt. As he rises through the ranks, Mrs. Potiphar takes a liking to Joseph. After Joseph refuses her advances, she has him imprisoned after tricking her husband. In prison, Joseph interprets the dreams of two fellow prisoners, both former servants to Pharaoh Ramesses II.

Pharaoh himself has been having some confusing dreams. Upon hearing about Joseph, Pharaoh calls him to interpret his dreams, which Joseph interprets as seven plentiful years of harvests followed by seven years of famine. Impressed, Pharaoh puts Joseph in charge of planning for the famine, and he rises to Vizier of Egypt. Back in Canaan, Joseph's family are suffering from the famine, and his brothers regret their actions. They travel to Egypt and beg Joseph for supplies, not recognising him. He tests them by setting up the youngest, Benjamin, to accuse him of theft, and the brothers beg Joseph to let him go. Seeing their change of heart, Joseph reveals his identity, and is joyously reunited with his family.

== Cast ==
- Donny Osmond as Joseph
- Maria Friedman as Narrator
- Richard Attenborough as Jacob
- Ian McNeice as Potiphar
- Joan Collins as Mrs. Potiphar
- Robert Torti as Pharaoh
- Christopher Biggins as The Baker
- Alex Jennings as The Butler
- Nicolas Colicos as Reuben
- Jeff Blumenkrantz as Simeon
- David J. Higgins as Levi
- Shaun Henson as Naphtali
- Patrick Clancy as Issachar
- Martin Callaghan as Asher
- Sebastien Torkia as Dan
- Michael Small as Zebulun
- Peter Challis as Gad
- Nick Holmes as Benjamin
- Gerry McIntyre as Judah
- Amanda Courtney-Davies as Wife/Apache Dancer

== Musical numbers ==
=== Act One ===
1. "Prologue" – Narrator
2. "Any Dream Will Do" – Joseph, Children
3. "Jacob and Sons/Joseph's Coat" – Joseph, Narrator, Jacob, Brothers, Wives, Children
4. "Joseph's Dreams" – Joseph, Narrator, Brothers, Female Ensemble
5. "Poor, Poor Joseph" – Narrator, Brothers, Female Ensemble, Children
6. "One More Angel in Heaven" – Reuben, Jacob, Reuben's Wife, Brothers, Wives
7. "Potiphar" – Joseph, Narrator, Potiphar, Mrs. Potiphar, Male Ensemble, Children
8. "Close Every Door" – Joseph, Ensemble Children
9. "Go, Go, Go Joseph" – Joseph, Narrator, Butler, Baker, Ensemble, Children

=== Act Two ===
10. "Pharaoh Story" – Narrator, Ensemble, Children
11. "Poor, Poor Pharaoh" – Joseph, Narrator, Pharaoh, Butler, Ensemble
12. "Song of the King" – Pharaoh, Ensemble, Children
13. "Pharaoh's Dreams Explained" – Joseph, Ensemble, Children
14. "Stone the Crows" – Joseph, Narrator, Pharaoh, Female Ensemble
15. "Those Canaan Days" – Simeon, Jacob, Brothers
16. "The Brothers Come To Egypt/Grovel, Grovel" – Joseph, Narrator, Brothers, Female Ensemble, Children
17. "Who's the Thief?" – Joseph, Narrator, Brothers, Female Ensemble, Children
18. "Benjamin Calypso" – Judah, Brothers, Female Ensemble, Children
19. "Joseph All the Time" – Joseph, Narrator, Female Ensemble, Children
20. "Jacob in Egypt" – Ensemble
21. "Any Dream Will Do (Reprise)/Give Me My Coloured Coat" – Joseph, Narrator, Ensemble, Children
22. "Joseph Megamix" – Full Company

== Release ==
The film was originally shot as a feature film, but ended up being released directly to video. It was shot over three weeks in July/August 1999 on three sound stages at Pinewood Studios in London. The release of the film was advertised by a brief series of sing-along performances that Osmond starred in as a Fathom Event. The film was released by PolyGram. In the United States, the film was shown as an episode of PBS' Great Performances.

== Reception ==
Reviews of the film were generally positive. The film has been described by PBS as being a "lively interpretation". Michael Dequina, online film critic for "TheMovieReport.com", described the film as a "sweet, candy-colored confection for the entire family".

== Legacy ==
In July 2023, many cast members who worked on the original film reunited by partaking in a livestream to celebrate the then upcoming 25-year anniversary the following year on Youtube on The Tammy Tuckey Show. The event had been organised ahead of time.
