= Ben James-Ellis =

English stage and script actor

- Born: 22 December 1988 (age 36); Scarborough, North Yorkshire, England
- Occupation: Actor
- Awards: Whatsonstage Award for Best Supporting Actor in a Musical; 2008 Hairspray

Benjamin James Ellis (born 22 December 1988) is an English stage and script actor who starred in the role of Link Larkin in the West End production of the musical Hairspray from its opening in October 2007 until July 2009.

He is most famous as a contestant on the BBC reality talent show Any Dream Will Do.

Since 2019 he has been the Head of Musical Theatre at the prestigious 'Diverse Performing Arts School' in Dubai.

== Background ==
James-Ellis was a student at the Italia Conti Academy of Theatre Arts. He used to perform at the Scarborough YMCA Theatre. He graduated in 2017

== Television career ==
James-Ellis was one of the finalists on Any Dream Will Do a 2007 talent show-themed television series produced by the BBC in the United Kingdom and broadcast on BBC One. The show searched for a new, unknown lead to play Joseph in a West End revival of the Andrew Lloyd Webber musical Joseph and the Amazing Technicolor Dreamcoat. He was in the bottom two in the first live show on 14 April alongside Chris Crosby, with Crosby having received the lowest number of viewers votes. In the sing-off, they sang "Bridge over Troubled Water". Andrew Lloyd Webber chose to save Ellis and eliminate Crosby. He was again in the sing-off in Week three on 28 April alongside Seamus Cullen with Cullen having received the lowest number of viewers votes. In the sing-off, they sang "He Ain't Heavy, He's My Brother". Lloyd Webber chose to save Ellis and eliminate Cullen.

He was in the bottom two for a third time in week seven on 26 May alongside Craig Chalmers with Ellis having received the lowest number of viewers' votes. In the sing-off, they sang "I Made It Through The Rain". Lloyd Webber for a third time chose to save Ellis, this time eliminating Chalmers. The following week he was again in the bottom two, this time alongside Lewis Bradley with Ellis having received the lowest number of viewers votes. In the sing-off, they sang "I Dreamed a Dream" from the musical Les Misérables. This time though Lloyd Webber chose to save Bradley and Ellis was finally eliminated from the show at the semi-final stage, finishing the series in fourth place.

On 15 June 2007, he appeared as the "Coat of Cash Wearing Celebrity" on The Friday Night Project on Channel 4. He also appeared on The Paul O'Grady Show in 2007.

On 3 December 2007 Ben performed with the cast of Hairspray at the Royal Variety Performance, held at Liverpool Empire Theatre, Liverpool, in front of Queen Elizabeth II and Prince Philip, Duke of Edinburgh. The show was screened on ITV, on 9 December. On 19 February 2008 he was a Ready Steady Cook contestant on BBC Two alongside his Hairspray co-star Leanne Jones. He won the show and donated the £100 prize to St Catherine's Hospice in his home town of Scarborough.

Ben appeared as Link Larkin in The Weakest Link "West End Musicals" show on BBC1.

The West End Cast of Hairspray performed on the BBC's Children in Need on 14 November 2008. They also performed on the Alan Titchmarsh Show (ITV), at the Variety Club Awards in London (Channel 4), on "Tonight's the Night" with John Barrowman and "Lets Dance for Comic Relief" both on BBC1.

Ben presenting the backstage reports of Hairspray: The School Musical for Sky 1, starting 31 August 2008. Ben has appeared in Bratz Design Academy on Nickelodeon and was a presenter on "Ultimate Car Tuning" on Sky TV.

Ben did some presenting work on Noels HQ for Sky 1.

=== Film and television credits ===
Year	Title	Role
2007	BBC series Any Dream Will Do	Himself
2007	The Friday Night Project	Himself
2007	The Paul O'Grady Show	Himself
2007	Royal Variety Performance	Link Larkin
2008	Ready Steady Cook	Himself
2008	The Weakest Link West End Special	Himself
2008	Children in Need	Link Larkin
2008	The Alan Titchmarsh Show	Link Larkin
2008	Tonight's The Night	Link Larkin
2008	Let's Dance for Comic Relief	Link Larkin
2009	Noel's HQ	Himself

== Stage career ==
On 28 June 2007, Ben began performing in the touring production of The Music of Dirty Dancing.

He originated the role of Link Larkin in the West End production of Hairspray. Previews began on 11 October 2007, with an opening night of 30 October. Alongside his Hairspray co-star Leanne Jones, James-Ellis performed at the 2008 Whatsonstage.com Year on Year Concert & Awards Show on 24 February 2008. He played his final performance in Hairspray on 25 July 2009.

In Autumn 2009 Ben toured the UK as a lead vocalist on the Michael Ball "Past and Present 25th Anniversary Tour". A DVD was produced of a performance from the Royal Albert Hall in London.

Ben starred as Peter Pan in Panto at Hull New Theatre from Thursday 10 December 2009 – Sunday 10 January 2010. Ben starred as the Cockney soldier in Brendan Behan's The Hostage at Southwark Playhouse from 3 to 20 February 2010. The play garnered many strong reviews. Ben joined the West End cast of Dreamboats and Petticoats as Norman in July 2010.

After finishing his stint in Dreamboats Ben went into panto starring as the Prince in "Snow White" at the Hawth Theatre Crawley with Craig Revel Horwood in December 2010, they worked together again in 2011 when Craig directed Ben in The Brother Loves Travelling Salvation Show, a new musical of Neil Diamond hits. Brian Conley and Darren Day also starred.

In June 2011 Ben joined the touring cast of Dreamboats and Petticoats as Norman, the Quiff was back! The cast performed across the UK, in Dublin and also in Luxembourg.

Ben completed the tour in November 2012 and went on to star as Jack in "Jack and the Beanstalk" at the Wolverhampton Grand Theatre from 8 December 2012 to 20 January 2013.

In April 2013 Ben became the lead singer on board Cunard's flagship, Queen Mary 2. He performed on the ship for four years until he returned to the UK in 2017.

Ben played as The Pharaoh in the UK tour of Joseph and the Amazing Technicolour Dreamcoat, alongside Joe McElderry and Lucy Kay, in 2017. He also accompanied McElderry on his UK tour throughout the same year, alongside Lloyd Daniels and fellow Any Dream Will Do finalist Keith Jack.

Since 2019 he has been the Head of Musical Theatre at the prestigious 'Diverse Performing Arts School' in Dubai.

=== Credits ===
Year	Title	Role	Theatre	Location
2007	Dirty Dancing	Johnny	—	UK National Tour
2007-09	Hairspray	Link Larkin	Shaftesbury Theatre	West End
2009	Michael Ball: Past & Present, 25th Anniversary Tour	Lead Vocalist	—	UK National Tour
2009-10	Peter Pan	Peter Pan	Hull New Theatre	Hull
2010	The Hostage	The Cockney Soldier	Southwark Playhouse	London
2010	Dreamboats and Petticoats	Norman	Playhouse Theatre	West End
2010-11	Snow White and the Seven Dwarfs	The Prince	Hawth Theatre	Crawley
2011	The Brother Loves Traveling Salvation Show	Neil	—	UK National Tour
2011-12	Dreamboats and Petticoats	Norman	—	UK National Tour
2012-13	Jack and the Beanstalk	Jack	Wolverhampton Grand Theatre	Wolverhampton
2013-17	Cunard's Queen Mary 2 Performer	Lead Singer	—	Worldwide
2017-18	Joseph and the Amazing Technicolor Dreamcoat	Pharaoh	—	UK National Tour
2018-19	Snow White and the Seven Dwarfs	The Prince	Maidstone Panto	Maidstone

== Recordings ==
In 2008 James-Ellis recorded a song with the Wicked actress Alexia Khadime for the CD Act One – Songs From The Musicals Of Alexander S. Bermange, an album of 20 brand new recordings by 26 West End stars, released in October 2008 on Dress Circle Records. He also recorded the song "Uptown Girl" along with Daniel Boys and Keith Jack, on the John Barrowman's album "Music Music Music". Ben featured with other members of the Hairspray cast on Michael Ball's "Past and Present" Album, singing "You Can't Stop The Beat" from the hit show.

== Awards ==
James-Ellis won the "Best Supporting Actor in a Musical" award at the 8th annual Whatsonstage Theatregoers' Choice Awards on 24 February 2008.
