= William Hinds =

American studio executive (1887–1957)

- Born: 21 November 1887; Hammersmith, London, England
- Died: 1 June 1957 (aged 69); Guildford, Surrey, England
- Citizenship: American
- Occupation: Studio executive
- Children: Anthony Hinds; Bill Hinds; Geoffrey Hinds; Shirley Hinds; Susan Hinds

William Hinds (21 November 1887 – 1 June 1957), stage name Will Hammer, was one of the founders of Hammer Film Productions.

== Jeweller ==
Hinds was a jeweller from London who, with his brother Frank, attended Latymer Upper School in Hammersmith and owned and ran Hinds Jewellers. Hinds and his brother had different business priorities, and shortly after the First World War they divided the business in two.

Both businesses were successful. Frank's part grew into the national jeweller F. Hinds, which has over 100 branches across England & Wales and is still owned and managed by the Hinds family.

Hinds continued to expand his business until he owned 25 jeweller's shops. He diversified into other types of retail, including operating barbers above some of the jewellery shops.

== Theatrical career ==
Hinds became involved in music halls and the theatre. His involvement included owning a number of seaside theatres, for example the West Cliff Theatre in Clacton, and performing onstage as a comedian, although it was said that the latter was not his greatest strength.

He also ran summer concert parties in conjunction with Jack Payne, the famous bandleader, and led a troupe called Will Hammer's Players, taking his stage name of Hammer from Hammersmith, where he lived.

In 1957 he set up Cascade Entertainments Ltd with theatre impresario George Baines and produced "Big Splash" Aqua Show at The Derby Baths in Blackpool. The show featured the singer Robert Earle and a troupe of divers and swimmers and was performed for the summer season. It was during the rehearsals for this show that he died following the bicycle accident.

== Motion picture career ==
Success with his theatres led Hinds to diversify into the increasingly popular motion picture industry.

In November 1934, Hinds registered his own film company, Hammer Productions Ltd.

Work began almost immediately on the first Hammer film, The Public Life of Henry the Ninth at the MGM/ATP studios, with shooting concluding on 2 January 1935. During this period Hinds met Spanish émigré Enrique Carreras, a former cinema owner, and on 10 May 1935 they formed a film distribution company Exclusive Films.

A slump in the British film industry forced Hammer Productions Ltd. into bankruptcy and the company went into liquidation in 1937. Exclusive, however, survived and continued to distribute films made by other companies. James Carreras (son of Enrique) resurrected the company in 1946 as Hammer Film Productions, the film production arm of Exclusive.

== Death ==
A lifelong interest of Hinds was cycling. He owned a number of cycle shops.

Hinds met his death while riding his bicycle near his Leatherhead home in 1957, a year after the centenary of the family jewellery business.

== Family ==
Hinds's oldest son William "Bill" Hinds continued to run the jewellery shops for many years. These were sold in the 1960s, but Bill continued as a jeweller. His widow eventually sold his remaining shop in Worthing, Sussex to the other half of the family, reuniting the jewellery business. It is now a branch of F. Hinds.

His second son, Anthony "Tony" Hinds, rejoined Hammer Film Productions in 1946. He had one more son Geoffrey Hinds and two daughters Shirley Hinds and Susan Hinds. At the time of his death he had been living with his long term partner Pat Hinds, mother of Susan, for thirteen years.
