= The Capitol Theatre, Horsham =

Arts centre in Horsham, England

Coordinates: 51.0641°N 0.3230°W

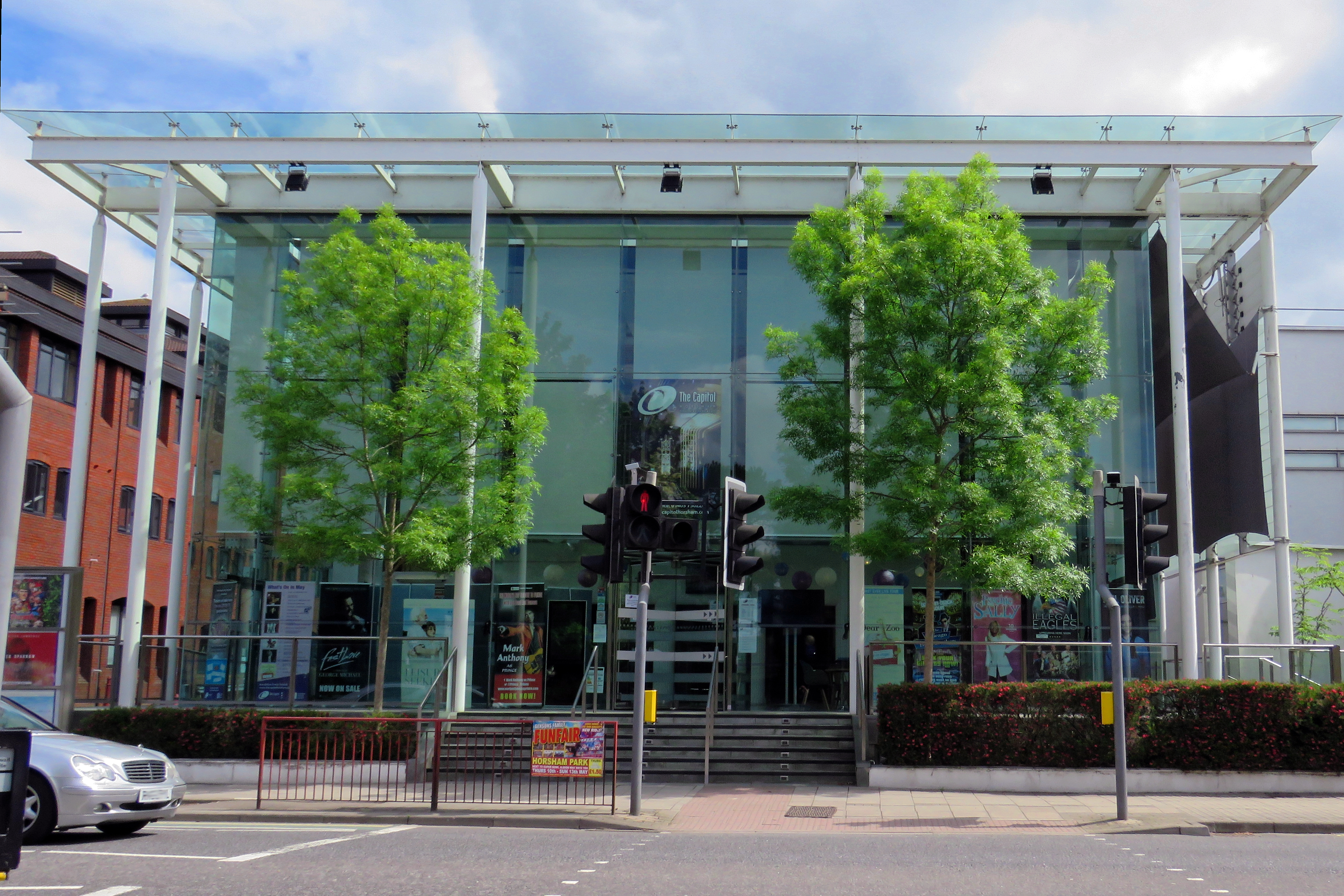
The Capitol

The Capitol Theatre is a multi-purpose arts venue in Horsham, West Sussex, England.

The original Capitol Theatre, built in Italian style by the Blue Flash Cinema Company, was opened on Wednesday 7 November 1923. As Earl Winterton was unable to be present speeches were made by Mrs. Campion, wife of Lt. Col. Campion of the Blue Flash company, who opened the venue, and Lady Burrel. The first silent film shown, Chu Chin Chow was accompanied by music played by the band of the 4th Royal Sussex Regiment and singing by baritone Frank Watts. Blue Flash had been set up to provide employment for soldiers of the battalion, especially the musicians, on a not-for-profit basis. The building work was undertaken by Goodman & Kay of Horsham. The building, on what was then London Road near the town centre, was set back from the street with an Italianate courtyard in front, including a fountain. A Hill, Norman & Beard organ was installed in 1924 and an RCA sound system in 1929.

The theatre was taken over by Union Cinemas in 1935, and they in turn were taken over by ABC Cinemas in 1937. In August 1954 ABC closed the cinema which was then used as a community centre, including live theatre, and was later a Regional Film Theatre for the British Film Institute. With its closure in 1983, Horsham District Council purchased a former ABC cinema on North Street, which had opened in 1936, and developed it into the Horsham Arts Centre. This opened to the public at Christmas 1984. After nearly 20 years Horsham Arts Centre closed in January 2002; a following £6 million refurbishment was completed by September 2003. The venue houses a 400-seat theatre, studio theatre, two cinema screens, gallery space, meeting room, café and lounge bar. The original Capitol Theatre was demolished. The new site was opened by HM Elizabeth II on 24 October 2003.

On 26 January 2008, Barney, Baby Bop, BJ and their new friend Riff performed here in Barney Live! - The Let's Go Tour in honor of Barney's 20th Anniversary.
