= Susan Rose (producer) =

American film producer

Susan R. Rose
- Born: Baltimore, Maryland
- Education: University of Maryland
- Occupations: Theatrical and film producer
- Known for: Joseph and the Amazing Technicolor Dreamcoat, The Last Five Years, Jack

Susan R. Rose (born 1956) is a Tony award winning theatrical and film producer. She co-produced the musical The Last Five Years. She is a producer of THE BAND'S VISIT, winner of 10 Tony Awards including the Tony for Best Musical 2018.

== Early life ==
Rose was born and raised in Baltimore, MD, where she graduated from the University of Maryland with a B.A. in Communications. While studying in Baltimore, Rose worked at Painter's Mill Music Fair and the Mechanic Theatre in an administrative capacity.

== Career ==
=== Broadway ===
Upon graduating from college, Rose produced the Andrew Lloyd Webber and Tim Rice musical Joseph and the Amazing Technicolor Dreamcoat at Ford's Theatre in Washington DC in 1980. When the show moved to Broadway in 1982, Rose was the youngest person to have produced a Broadway show. Rose was nominated for the Tony Award for Best Musical. Her other Broadway producing credits include David Rabe's Hurlyburly (Tony Award nomination, Best Play), Athol Fugard's Blood Knot (Tony Award nomination, Best Revival of a Play), and Larry Shue's The Nerd. Rose is a coproducer of the Tony award winning Broadway musical THE BAND'S VISIT, MACBETH starring Daniel Craig and the upcoming revival of TOMMY.

=== Off-Broadway ===
Rose produced the Drama Desk Award-winning musical The Last Five Years (with Renee Landegger). Also with Landegger, she commissioned the world premiere of The Secret Letters of Jackie and Marilyn (Pittsburgh Public Theatre) and Sabina (Primary Stages). Rose and Joan Stein co created the play MOTHERHOOD OUT LOUD. The play had it World Premiere at the Hartford Stage Company and had successful runs at the Geffen Playhouse and Primary Stages.

=== Film career ===
Susan R. Rose's first film was the NBC Movie of the Week A Child Lost Forever starring Beverly D'Angelo. In 1996, Rose joined forces with Dan Paulson, and the two have produced movies for CBS, Showtime and Lifetime. Their movies include Mr. and Mrs. Loving starring Timothy Hutton, Best Friends For Life starring Gena Rowlands and Linda Lavin, the Emmy-nominated A Cooler Climate starring Sally Field and Judy Davis, Custody of the Heart starring Lorraine Bracco and the Emmy-winning Jack, starring Stockard Channing and Ron Silver.

== Accolades ==
Susan is a member of the Academy of Television Arts and Sciences, the Producers Guild of America, and the Society of Children’s Book Writers and Illustrators. She currently serves on the Board of the TEAM.

== Current pursuits ==
Motherhood Out Loud- Conceived by Susan R. Rose and Joan Stein.

"Motherhood Out Loud never fails to strike both the funny bone and the heart." - Suzy Evans, Backstage.com

"The thoughtful Motherhood Out Loud is hilariously quotable" - Juliet Wittman, Westworld

Susan has coauthored the Easy Readers JOSE AND EL PERRO and JOSE AND FELIZ PLAY FUTBOL with Penguin Workshop/Random HouseHouse
