= West Cliff Theatre =

Theatre in Clacton-on-Sea, England

Coordinates: 51.7867°N 1.1484°E

Exterior view

The West Cliff Theatre in Clacton-on-Sea, England, dates back to 1894 when Bert Graham, a 21-year-old civil servant, set up a concert party on a patch of waste ground in Agate Road. In 1899, along with Bernard Russell and Will Bentley, Graham moved the concert party to the West Cliff Gardens. Bernard Russell died in 1910, but Graham and Bentley continued the concert party. In 1912 they signed up a new romantic baritone by the name of Stanley Holloway. He stayed with the company for three years.

In 1928, Graham and Bentley built a new theatre on the site of their concert party, the theatre which still stands in Clacton-on-Sea today as the West Cliff Theatre. In 1934, Graham and Bentley sold the theatre and it was bought by Will Hammer, who already owned several seaside theatres. In 1934 he also founded the film company Hammer Film Productions, which was later to gain worldwide fame as the producer of many horror films.

Will Hammer died in 1957 and there was much doubt over whether the theatre would continue. Eventually, Clacton Council bought the theatre and continued to put on shows.

In 1985, a local group of theatre enthusiasts took over the day-to-day running of the theatre, making it an all-year-round venue in 1989, and in 1995, they bought the freehold of the theatre from the council. The West Cliff (Tendring) Trust is now solely responsible for putting on the shows at the theatre and still maintain the tradition of putting on a summer show.
