= Joseph and the Amazing Technicolor Dreamcoat =

Musical by Tim Rice and Andrew Lloyd Webber

- 1991 Revivals Logo
- Music: Andrew Lloyd Webber
- Lyrics: Tim Rice
- Book: Tim Rice
- Basis: The story of Joseph in Genesis
- Productions: 1972 Edinburgh International Festival; 1973 West End; 1974 UK full-length production 1982 Broadway; 1991 West End revival 1993 Broadway revival 2003 West End revival 2007 West End revival 2019 West End revival 2021 West End revival 2022 UK Tour; 2022 Australian Tour; 2025 UK Tour

Joseph and the Amazing Technicolor Dreamcoat is a sung-through musical with music by Andrew Lloyd Webber and lyrics by Tim Rice, based on the character Joseph from the Bible's Book of Genesis. This was the first Lloyd Webber and Rice musical to be performed publicly: their first collaboration, The Likes of Us, written in 1965, was not performed in public until 2005. Its family-friendly retelling of Joseph, familiar themes, and catchy music have resulted in numerous stagings. According to the owner of the copyright, the Really Useful Group, by 2008 more than 20,000 productions had been staged by schools and amateur theatre groups.

Joseph... was first presented as a 15-minute "pop cantata" at Colet Court School in London in 1968, and was published by Novello and recorded in an expanded form by Decca Records in 1969. After the success of the next Lloyd Webber and Rice piece, Jesus Christ Superstar, Joseph... received amateur stage productions in the US beginning in 1970, and the first American release of the album was in 1971. The musical had its professional premiere, as a 35-minute version, at the Haymarket ice rink during the Edinburgh International Festival in 1972. It was Part Two of Bible One, a Young Vic Theatre Company production presented by the National Theatre of Great Britain. While still undergoing various modifications and expansions, the musical was produced in the West End in 1973. In 1974, its full modern format was performed at the Haymarket Theatre in Leicester and was also recorded that year. The musical was mounted on Broadway in 1982. Several major revivals, national tours, and a 1999 direct-to-video film starring Donny Osmond followed.

== Synopsis ==
=== Act I ===
Joseph and the Amazing Technicolor Dreamcoat is based on the story of Joseph from the Book of Genesis.

A Narrator opens the show by introducing Joseph, the dreamer ("Prologue"). Joseph sings an inspiring song to the audience ("Any Dream Will Do"). The Narrator then draws the audience's attention to Joseph's father Jacob and his 12 sons ("Jacob and Sons"). Jacob favours Joseph over his other sons, and he gives Joseph a multicoloured coat to show his affection for him. Joseph is ecstatic about this gift ("Joseph's Coat"), while his brothers look on with jealousy.

The brothers’ jealousy is compounded by Joseph's dreams, which suggest that he is destined to rule over them ("Joseph's Dreams"). To stop this from happening, they try to kill him by throwing him down a pit, before changing their minds and selling him as a slave to some passing Ishmaelites. The Narrator comments on how powerless Joseph was to stop this ("Poor, Poor Joseph").

To hide what they have done, Joseph's brothers and their wives tell Jacob that his beloved son has been killed. As proof, they show him Joseph's coat, which they have torn to pieces and covered in goat's blood ("One More Angel in Heaven"). When the devastated Jacob exits, the brothers and wives cheerfully celebrate Joseph's departure ("Hoedown").

Meanwhile, Joseph is taken to Egypt, where he is bought as a slave by the wealthy Potiphar. He works hard and is promoted, eventually running the household. Joseph catches the eye of Mrs Potiphar and, although he turns down her advances, Potiphar sees them together and jumps to the wrong conclusion ("Potiphar"). Enraged, he throws Joseph in jail.

A heartbroken Joseph laments his situation ("Close Every Door"). Two prisoners, both former servants of the Pharaoh, are put in his cell. Joseph interprets their strange dreams and predicts the butler will return to Pharaoh's service, while the baker will be executed. As Joseph questions his predictions, the other prisoners encourage Joseph to follow his own dreams ("Go, Go, Go Joseph").

=== Act II ===
The Narrator opens the second act with news that the Egyptian populace has been plagued by dreams that no one can interpret ("Pharaoh Story"). The butler, now freed and again serving Pharaoh, tells him of Joseph's skill at deciphering dreams ("Poor, Poor Pharaoh"). Pharaoh has Joseph brought to him and describes his dreams, one involving seven fat cows, being devoured by seven skinny cows, and another about seven healthy ears of corn, similarly being devoured by seven withered ears of corn ("Song of the King").

Joseph declares that Egypt will see seven years of plentiful harvests, followed by an equal period of severe famine, and that Pharaoh must select a man to help Egypt prepare for the famine ("Pharaoh's Dreams Explained"). Impressed with what he hears, Pharaoh pardons and frees Joseph, makes him his second-in-command, and puts him in charge of famine preparations. As the seven plentiful years end, and the seven years of famine begins, Egypt, under Joseph's leadership, manages to persevere ("Stone the Crows").

Meanwhile, Joseph's family back home is now starving and poor, having lost their farm and living off scraps in a brothel. Joseph's brothers regret what they did to him and how they lied to their father, thinking that things might have turned out differently if Joseph was still with them ("Those Canaan Days"). Hearing that Egypt still has food, they travel there to beg for supplies ("The Brothers Come to Egypt").

In Egypt, the brothers beg for food from Joseph, not recognizing him, and Joseph realizes that as the brothers bow before him this is the dream he had years ago coming true. He initially suggests the brothers might be spies, but they sincerely insist they're struggling ("Grovel, Grovel"). Joseph gives them sacks of food, but in an act of revenge for their attempted fratricide, plants a golden cup in the one belonging to Benjamin, his youngest brother. When the brothers attempt to depart, Joseph stops them, accusing them of theft. Each brother empties his sack ("Who's the Thief?"), and when the cup is found in Benjamin's sack Joseph accuses him of stealing. The other brothers beg Joseph to take them prisoner instead and let Benjamin go free ("Benjamin Calypso").

Joseph sees that his brothers have changed and reveals who he really is ("Joseph All the Time"), then sends for Jacob ("Jacob in Egypt"). Upon meeting Jacob for the first time in years, Joseph sings "Any Dream Will Do" again, and the lyrics are revealed to be a vague overview of the story. Jacob returns Joseph's coat to him, now fully repaired ("Give Me My Coloured Coat")

In some productions, the cast perform a medley of songs from the show as they take their bows ("Joseph Megamix").

== Production ==
=== Development and early vocal performances, publication, and recordings 1968–1971 ===
The 17-year-old budding musical-theatre composer Andrew Lloyd Webber was contacted by the 20-year-old aspiring pop-songwriter Tim Rice in 1965, and they created their first musical, The Likes of Us. They produced a demo tape of that work in 1966, but the project failed to gain a backer.

In the summer of 1967, Alan Doggett, a family friend of the Lloyd Webber family who had assisted on The Likes of Us and who was the music teacher at the Colet Court school in London, commissioned Lloyd Webber and Rice to write a piece for the school's choir. Doggett requested a "pop cantata" along the lines of Herbert Chappell's The Daniel Jazz (1963) and Michael Hurd's Jonah-Man Jazz (1966), both of which had been published by Novello and were based on the Old Testament. The request for the new piece came with a 100-guinea advance from Novello. This resulted in Joseph and the Amazing Technicolor Dreamcoat, a retelling of the biblical story of Joseph, in which Lloyd Webber and Rice humorously pastiched a number of pop-music styles.

The piece was first presented as a 15-minute pop cantata at Colet Court School in London on 1 March 1968. Lloyd Webber's composer father William arranged for a second performance at his church, Methodist Central Hall, with a revised and expanded 20-minute format; the boys of Colet Court and members of the band Mixed Bag sang at this performance in May 1968. One of the children's parents in that audience was Derek Jewell, a Sunday Times music critic; he reviewed the piece in the newspaper, calling it a new pop oratorio and praising its innovation and exuberance. By its third performance, at St Paul's Cathedral in November 1968, the musical had been expanded to 35 minutes.

Novello published the lyrics and sheet music of the 20-minute version at the beginning of 1969, as the third of their Old Testament pop cantatas. Decca Records, which had already recorded the St Paul's Cathedral version of the musical in the summer of 1968, released the recording in 1969, credited to the Joseph Consortium, following the Novello publication. David Daltrey, front man of British psychedelic band Tales of Justine, played the role of Joseph and lead guitar, and Tim Rice was Pharaoh. Other vocalists included members of the Mixed Bag group, such as Terry Saunders and Malcolm Parry, and the choir of Colet Court School.

The album was later issued in the US on Scepter Records in 1971, to capitalise on the success of 1970's Jesus Christ Superstar in the US.

=== Early stage performances ===
==== First American amateur productions 1970–1973 ====
Lloyd Webber and Rice used the popularity of their subsequent musical, the rock opera Jesus Christ Superstar, to promote Joseph, which was advertised in America as a "follow-up" to Superstar. The rock opera's title song "Superstar" had been an international hit single released in late 1969, and "I Don't Know How To Love Him", another hit from Jesus Christ Superstar, was released 1 May 1970. The first American production of Joseph was an amateur stage production in May 1970, at Cathedral College of the Immaculate Conception in Douglaston, Queens, New York City. Following this, other schools and colleges sought to produce the piece.

==== Young Vic UK production and move to West End and Leicester 1972–1974 ====
In late August and September 1972, Joseph was presented at the Edinburgh International Festival by the Young Vic Theatre Company, directed by Frank Dunlop. It starred Gary Bond in the title role, Peter Reeves as the narrator, and Gordon Waller as Pharaoh; Alan Doggett was the music director. In October the production played at London's Young Vic Theatre, and in November at the Roundhouse. The production was part of a double bill called Bible One: Two Looks at the Book of Genesis. Part I was Dunlop's reworking of the first six of the medieval Wakefield Mystery Plays, with music by Alan Doggett. Part II was Joseph and the Amazing Technicolor Dreamcoat. This production of Joseph, still a 35-minute musical, was also broadcast in the UK by Granada Television in 1972.

In February 1973, theatre producer Michael White and impresario Robert Stigwood mounted a further expanded version of the Young Vic production at the Albery Theatre in the West End, where it ran for 243 performances. This Young Vic production of Joseph was recorded for an LP released on the RSO label in 1973. The mystery plays that had preceded the original Young Vic productions were dropped, and instead the musical was preceded by a piece called Jacob's Journey, with music and lyrics by Lloyd Webber and Rice and a book by television comedy writers Ray Galton and Alan Simpson. Jacob's Journey, which contained a great deal of spoken dialogue, was eventually phased out in favour of a sung-through score that became part of Joseph. The first production of the show in its modern, final form was at the Haymarket Theatre in Leicester, which presented the musical several times from 1974 through 1978.

==== English Cast charts ====
Chart (1973)	Position
Australia (Kent Music Report)	39

==== Irish productions, 1974–1978 ====
Starting in 1974, Irish stage and screen producer Noel Pearson mounted an Irish production of Joseph, starring Tony Kenny in the title role and with Pearson playing Jacob, which ran off-and-on for several years on several stages, starting in the Olympia Theatre in Dublin, moving on to the Cork Opera House for a two-week run, then to Limerick and then the Gaiety Theatre in Dublin, followed by several other venues over the next 4 years. A cast recording was produced by Ram Records.

=== Professional US productions, including Broadway, 1974–1984 ===
In 1974, Joseph and the Amazing Technicolor Dreamcoat was performed at the Playhouse in the Park in Philadelphia. The musical ran at the Brooklyn Academy of Music in New York in 1976 and in 1977 as "holiday fare". In the 1976 production, which opened on 30 December, direction was by Frank Dunlop, with a cast that featured Cleavon Little as the Narrator and David James Carroll as Joseph. In the 1977 production, running in December through 1 January 1978, staging was by Graciela Daniele, with Carroll as Joseph, Alan Weeks as the Narrator and William Parry as Pharaoh/Elvis. In 1979, Joseph made its Connecticut debut at the historic Downtown Cabaret Theatre ahead of moving to New York City.

Joseph received an Off-Broadway production at the Entermedia Theatre, running from 18 November 1981 through 24 January 1982. Directed by Tony Tanner, the cast starred Bill Hutton as Joseph, Laurie Beechman as the Narrator, and Tom Carder as Pharaoh.

The production transferred to Broadway at the Royale Theatre on 27 January 1982 and ran through 4 September 1983, with 747 performances. Judith Dolan designed costumes for the production. This production was recorded on the Chrysalis label, and is the first to feature the Prologue (dubbed on the Chrysalis release "You are what you feel"). The producers were Gail Berman and Susan Rose, who were the youngest producers on Broadway. The show received six Tony Award nominations including Best Musical and Best Original Score but won none. Allen Fawcett replaced Hutton as Joseph in June 1982. David Cassidy took over the role of Joseph in March 1983 and also performed in the touring cast in 1983–1984.

=== 1990s ===
With Jason Donovan in the lead, the expanded show was restaged in 1991 at the London Palladium with Steven Pimlott as director and Anthony Van Laast as choreographer, winning the 1992 Laurence Olivier Award for set design. The cast album of this production was the #1 UK album for two weeks in September 1991, and the single "Any Dream Will Do" from it was also the #1 UK single for two weeks in June–July 1991. When Donovan left, former children's TV presenter Phillip Schofield portrayed Joseph. Darren Day would take up the role in 1993.

The musical opened in Toronto at the Elgin Theatre in June, 1992 until September that same year, with Donny Osmond as Joseph and Janet Metz as the Narrator. Following five years in the role, Osmond was succeeded by David Burnham as Joseph.

A major Australian production, based on the 1991 UK version, opened on 31 December 1992 at the State Theatre in Melbourne. It featured Indecent Obsession lead singer David Dixon as Joseph and Tina Arena as the Narrator. The musical then played seasons in Brisbane and Sydney through 1993.

The show was revived in the United States in 1993, playing in Los Angeles at the Pantages Theatre for 18 weeks, and in San Francisco at the Golden Gate Theatre for an 8-week run, before moving to Broadway, where it played for 231 performances at the Minskoff Theatre from 10 November 1993 to 29 May 1994. The cast featured Michael Damian (Joseph), Kelli Rabke (Narrator), Clifford David (Jacob), and Robert Torti (Pharaoh). Patrick Cassidy and Debbie Gibson performed 16 shows between 6–16 December 1999, at the Shubert Theatre in Chicago, IL. 29 students from Lake Bluff Middle School performed as part of the choir. David Osmond, Donny's nephew, replaced Damian as Joseph.

=== 2000s ===
A production starring Stephen Gately previewed in Oxford in December 2002, before moving to Liverpool over Christmas 2002. This production reached the West End at the New London Theatre in March 2003. Ian "H" Watkins took over the role of Joseph in 2005.

A US national tour began in September 2005 in Milwaukee, Wisconsin, starring Patrick Cassidy. A 2007 revival of the London Palladium production at the Adelphi Theatre starred a Joseph cast with the winner of BBC One's Any Dream Will Do, presided over by Lloyd Webber. This was the second reality talent show to search for a West End star, capitalising on the success of the 2006 BBC–Lloyd Webber series, How Do You Solve a Problem like Maria?. Viewers voted for Lee Mead as Joseph. Mead had previously played both Levi and Pharaoh in the 2005 UK Touring production. Mead had given up his ensemble role in The Phantom of the Opera, where he also understudied Raoul. The new Joseph production, which began on 6 July 2007, used Steven Pimlott's original direction (Pimlott had died since staging the Palladium production), with Preeya Kalidas as the Narrator. Any Dream Will Do finalist Lewis Bradley played Joseph for several shows in 2008 whilst Mead was on holiday. Gareth Gates took over the role in 2009.

Any Dream Will Do contestant Craig Chalmers was cast in the 2007 UK Tour alongside fellow contestant Keith Jack as the Narrator. Chris Barton, another contestant, starred as Benjamin, as well as Joseph in several performances. Any Dream Will Do contestant Antony Hansen took over the role of Joseph in 2009.

=== 2010s ===
The long-running UK touring production was re-cast in 2010 with Keith Jack taking on Joseph in July 2010 opposite Jennifer Potts as the Narrator.

A new North American touring production began on 4 March 2014 in Cleveland, Ohio, starring Diana DeGarmo as the Narrator and Ace Young as Joseph.

The 2013 UK touring production starred Ian "H" Watkins as Joseph, who had previously playing the role in the West End in 2005. Former X-Factor star Lloyd Daniels, appeared in the 2014 UK Tour as Joseph with Danielle Hope as the Narrator. The 2016 UK touring production starred Joe McElderry as Joseph and Lucy Kay as the Narrator. Former Any Dream Will Do contestant Ben James-Ellis appeared as both Pharaoh and Issachar. The tour started again in February 2019 with Jaymi Hensley taking the lead role, with Trina Hill portraying the Narrator.

In November 2018 it was announced that Joseph would return to the London Palladium for a limited run over the summer in 2019 to celebrate the show's 50th anniversary. Sheridan Smith starred as the Narrator and Jason Donovan played Pharaoh, with the title role of Joseph being played by drama school graduate Jac Yarrow. The production ran from 27 June 2019 to 8 September, officially opening 11 July, and was produced by Michael Harrison with choreography by JoAnn M. Hunter. The success of this production led to it being announced to make a return the following year.

=== 2020s ===
On 17 February 2020, a 50th anniversary concert production of Joseph was staged at Lincoln Center's David Geffen Hall in New York City. Produced by Manhattan Concert Productions, the production was directed by Michael Arden and conducted by Stephen Oremus, and accompanied by the New York City Chamber Orchestra with over 300 singers. The one night only sold-out concert presentation starred Noah Galvin (a last minute replacement for Ari'el Stachel) as Joseph along with Eden Espinosa, Alex Newell, and Jessica Vosk sharing the central role of The Narrator. Additional casting included Chuck Cooper as Jacob, Andy Karl as Potiphar, Orfeh as Mrs. Potiphar, and Merle Dandridge as The Pharaoh.

The production returned to the London Palladium in 2021, playing a limited season from 1 July to 5 September. The production, which was postponed from 2020 due to the COVID-19 pandemic, saw Alexandra Burke join the company as The Narrator and Yarrow and Donovan return to the roles of Joseph and Pharaoh respectively. Linzi Hateley reprised her role as the Narrator in specific performances, with choreography once again by Joann M. Hunter and produced by Michael Harrison.

In 2022 the production embarked on a UK Tour opening in Manchester in March until 29 October in Edinburgh.

In November 2022, the London Palladium production opened in Melbourne, Australia. The production then moved to Sydney opening, at the Capitol Theatre on 11 February, 2023.

On 21 February 2024, it was announced that the London Palladium production would play a limited season at the Edinburgh Playhouse over Christmas 2024, opening on 3 December 2024, with Donny Osmond playing the role of Pharaoh. The production is to be directed by Laurence Connor, produced by Michael Harrison and choreography again by JoAnn M. Hunter, and further casting to be announced, the production will then embark on a UK tour.

== Characters ==
- Narrator: A character not of the time or place of the action. The Narrator tells the story through word and song, guiding the audience gently through the story of Joseph and his brothers, usually gives meaning to the story with their words. In early productions this character was usually played by a man; later productions have featured a woman in the role. The Narrator sometimes doubles as various characters.
- Jacob: The father of twelve sons, his favourite being Joseph. At times he may appear unfair and shallow, but he is, more importantly, the prophet who recognises the future and the calling of Joseph, thus saving the House of Israel. Sometimes doubles as Potiphar or the Narrator.
- Joseph: Eleventh son of Jacob. Obviously his father's favourite, Joseph early on shows a talent for interpreting dreams and telling the future. This gets him into trouble with his brothers when he predicts his future will include ruling over the other eleven. However, it saves his life when in Egypt he correctly interprets Pharaoh's dreams. In the end he has risen to a great position of power, but he still forgives his brothers and brings his family to Egypt to partake of the bounty he has accumulated there.
- Ishmaelites: Men of the desert, they buy Joseph as a slave, take him to Egypt, and sell him to Potiphar.
- Potiphar: A powerful and rich Egyptian, Potiphar purchases Joseph and puts him to work in his household, where he soon realises that Joseph is honest, hard-working, and a great addition to his pool of help. When he grows suspicious of Mrs. Potiphar and Joseph, however, he grows angry and has Joseph thrown into prison. Often played by the actor playing Jacob.
- Mrs. Potiphar: Beautiful but evil, Mrs. Potiphar tries to seduce Joseph, but is unsuccessful. However, she does manage to rip off much of his clothing just as her husband comes into the room, thus condemning him to prison. Also plays one of the wives.
- Baker: One of Pharaoh's servants, the Baker is in prison with Joseph who correctly interprets his dreams and predicts that he will be put to death. Played by one of the brothers.
- Butler: Another of Pharaoh's servants, the Butler is also in prison with Joseph who also correctly interprets his dreams, this time that he will be released and taken back into Pharaoh's household. It is the Butler who tells Pharaoh about Joseph and his uncanny ability with dreams. Played by one of the brothers.
- Pharaoh: The most powerful man in Egypt, Pharaoh is considered a god on earth. When Joseph interprets his dreams, he promotes him to one of the highest positions in his government. In most productions, Pharaoh is portrayed as an Elvis Presley-style figure. Sometimes played by one of the brothers.
- Joseph's Eleven Brothers: Although acting usually as a group, they each have their own different personalities, talents, and flaws. As a group they sell Joseph into slavery, but as individuals they deal with the following years and how they can make amends. They sing and dance their way through many situations and places. The brothers also double as Egyptians and servants of Potiphar.
  - Reuben: Eldest son of Jacob. Takes the lead on "One More Angel in Heaven"
  - Simeon: Second son of Jacob. Takes the lead on "Those Canaan Days"
  - Levi: Third son of Jacob.
  - Judah: Fourth son of Jacob. Takes the lead on "Benjamin Calypso".
  - Dan: Fifth son of Jacob.
  - Naphtali: Sixth son of Jacob.
  - Gad: Seventh son of Jacob.
  - Asher: Eighth son of Jacob.
  - Issachar: Ninth son of Jacob.
  - Zebulun: Tenth son of Jacob.
  - Benjamin: Youngest son of Jacob. Joseph accuses him of stealing the golden cup.
- The Wives: The wives of Jacob's sons. The actresses playing the wives also double as Egyptians and servants of Potiphar.
- Adult chorus
- Children's chorus

== Principal casts ==
Character	West End (1973)	Brooklyn (1976)	Broadway (1982)	West End Revival (1991)	Toronto (1992)	Broadway Revival (1993)	West End Revival (2007)	Tour (2014)
Joseph	Gary Bond	David-James Carroll	Bill Hutton	Jason Donovan	Donny Osmond	Michael Damian	Lee Mead	Ace Young
Narrator	Peter Reeves	Cleavon Little	Laurie Beechman	Linzi Hateley	Janet Metz	Kelli Rabke	Preeya Kalidas	Diana DeGarmo
Pharaoh	Gordon Waller	Jesse Pearson	Tom Carder	David Easter	Johnny Seaton	Robert Torti	Dean Collinson	Ryan Williams
Jacob	Alex McAvoy	Tony Hoty	Gordon Stanley	Aubrey Woods	Michael Fletcher	Clifford David	Stephen Tate	William Thomas Evans
Potiphar	Gavin Reed	Terry Eno	David Ardao	Aubrey Woods	Michael Fletcher	Clifford David	Stephen Tate	William Thomas Evans
Mrs. Potiphar	Joan Heal	Virginia Martin	Randon Lo	Nadia Strahan	Karen Holness	Julie Bond	Verity Bentham	Claire Camp
Baker	Riggs O'Hara	Kurt Yaghjian	Barry Tarallo	Patrick Clancy	Trent Armand Kendall	Bill Nolte	Adam Pearce	Patrick John Moran
Butler	Andrew Robertson	David Patrick Kelly	Kenneth Bryan	Paul Tomkinson	Rufus Bonds, Jr.	Glenn Sneed	Russell Walker	Vincent D'Elia

== Musical numbers ==
Act I

- "Prologue" – Narrator
- "Any Dream Will Do" – Joseph, Children
- "Jacob and Sons/Joseph's Coat" – Joseph, Narrator, Jacob, Brothers, Wives, Children
- "Joseph's Dreams" – Joseph, Narrator, Brothers, Female Ensemble
- "Poor, Poor Joseph" – Narrator, Brothers, Female Ensemble, Children
- "One More Angel in Heaven" – Reuben, Jacob, Reuben's Wife, Brothers, Wives
- "Potiphar" – Joseph, Narrator, Potiphar, Mrs. Potiphar, Male Ensemble, Children
- "Close Every Door" – Joseph, Ensemble, Children
- "Go, Go, Go Joseph" – Joseph, Narrator, Baker, Butler, Ensemble, Children

Act II

- "Pharaoh Story" – Narrator, Ensemble, Children
- "Poor, Poor Pharaoh" – Joseph, Narrator, Pharaoh, Butler, Ensemble
- "Song of the King" – Pharaoh, Ensemble, Children
- "Pharaoh's Dreams Explained" – Joseph, Ensemble, Children
- "Stone the Crows" – Joseph, Narrator, Pharaoh, Female Ensemble
- "Those Canaan Days" – Simeon, Brothers
- "The Brothers Come to Egypt/Grovel, Grovel" – Joseph, Narrator, Brothers, Female Ensemble, Children
- "Who's the Thief?" – Joseph, Narrator, Brothers, Female Ensemble, Children
- "Benjamin Calypso" – Judah, Brothers, Female Ensemble, Children
- "Joseph All the Time" – Joseph, Narrator, Brothers, Female Ensemble, Children
- "Jacob in Egypt" – Ensemble
- "Any Dream Will Do (Reprise)/Give Me My Coloured Coat" – Joseph, Narrator, Ensemble, Children
- "Joseph Megamix" – Full Company

Lloyd Webber and Rice used a variety of musical styles, including a parody of French ballads ("Those Canaan Days"), Elvis-themed rock and roll ("Song of the King"), Country/Western music ("One More Angel in Heaven"), 1920s Charleston ("Potiphar"), Calypso ("Benjamin Calypso"), jazz ("Joseph's Dreams") and 1970s go-go ("Go, Go, Go Joseph").

"Prologue" was first included in the 1982 Broadway production; the inclusion of "Any Dream Will Do" at the start of the show (and the renaming of the closing version as per the above list) dates from the 1991 revival. The UK touring production circa 1983–87 (produced by Bill Kenwright) included an additional song "I Don't Think I'm Wanted Back at Home", which was originally part of Jacob's Journey.

The 2007 West End revival and several of the UK Tour productions included "King of My Heart" performed by Pharaoh which was sung after "Stone the Crows".

== Awards and nominations ==
=== Original Broadway production ===
Year	Award	Category	Nominee	Result
1982	Tony Award	Best Musical		Nominated
1982	Tony Award	Best Book of a Musical	Tim Rice	Nominated
1982	Tony Award	Best Original Score	Andrew Lloyd Webber and Tim Rice	Nominated
1982	Tony Award	Best Performance by a Featured Actor in a Musical	Bill Hutton	Nominated
1982	Tony Award	Best Performance by a Featured Actress in a Musical	Laurie Beechman	Nominated
1982	Tony Award	Best Direction of a Musical	Tony Tanner	Nominated
1982	Tony Award	Best Choreography	Tony Tanner	Nominated
1982	Drama Desk Award	Outstanding Musical		Nominated
1982	Drama Desk Award	Outstanding Featured Actress in a Musical	Laurie Beechman	Nominated
1982	Drama Desk Award	Outstanding Director of a Musical	Tony Tanner	Nominated

=== 1991 West End revival ===
Year	Award	Category	Nominee	Result
1992	Laurence Olivier Award	Best Musical Revival		Nominated
1992	Laurence Olivier Award	Best Actor in a Musical	Jason Donovan	Nominated
1992	Laurence Olivier Award	Best Actress in a Musical	Linzi Hateley	Nominated
1992	Laurence Olivier Award	Best Director of a Musical	Steven Pimlott	Nominated
1992	Laurence Olivier Award	Best Theatre Choreographer	Anthony Van Laast	Nominated
1992	Laurence Olivier Award	Best Set Designer	Mark Thompson	Won

=== 2003 West End revival ===
Year	Award	Category	Nominee	Result
2004	Laurence Olivier Award	Best Musical Revival		Nominated

=== 2019 West End revival ===
Year	Award	Category	Nominee	Result
2019	Evening Standard Theatre Award	Best Musical Performance	Sheridan Smith	Nominated
2020	Laurence Olivier Award	Best Musical Revival		Nominated
2020	Laurence Olivier Award	Best Actor in a Musical	Jac Yarrow	Nominated

== Film adaptations ==
=== 1999 direct-to-video film ===
In 1999, a direct-to-video film adaptation of the same title starring Donny Osmond was released by Polygram Video, directed by David Mallet and based on Steven Pimlott's 1991 London Palladium production. Osmond had toured North America in the role after opening the Toronto revival in 1992. In the film, Maria Friedman appears as the Narrator, Richard Attenborough as Jacob, Ian McNeice as Potiphar, Joan Collins as Mrs. Potiphar and Robert Torti reprised his role from the 1993 Broadway Production as Pharaoh. It also aired on PBS as part of Great Performances.

=== Planned animated feature film adaptation ===
In March 2017, at CinemaCon, STX Entertainment announced an animated film version of the musical with new songs written by Lloyd Webber and Rice. However, no further updates were made since.

=== Planned live action feature film adaptation ===
In the 1970s Ned Sherrin's Virgin Films tried to turn the musical into a film.

On 12 April, 2023, it was revealed that Lloyd Webber's Really Useful Group had wanted to adapt the musical into a big-budget narrative feature film, and that Amazon MGM Studios had acquired the film rights with Scott Sanders and Mara Jacobs set to produce. Jon M. Chu, for which this film is considered his passion project, will direct and co-produce the film with Andrew Lloyd Webber, Tim Rice, Lance Johnson and Benjamin Lowy set to serve as executive producers. Dana Fox and Daniel Goldfarb will pen the screenplay, with the former reuniting with Chu following her work on co-writing the screenplay for the two-part film adaptation of Wicked. On 31 December 2024, it was revealed that Lloyd Webber and Rice will contribute new songs for the film.

== In popular culture ==
In Douglas Adams's novel The Hitchhiker's Guide to the Galaxy, Joseph and the Amazing Technicolor Dreamcoat is one of the "dog eared scripts" the character Ford Prefect keeps in his satchel to pretend he is auditioning for plays and to hide devices such as ones that allow him to identify and hail nearby spaceships.

In the Seinfeld episode "The Wig Master", Kramer borrows a colorful, extravagant coat from a wig master working on the touring production of Joseph and the Amazing Technicolor Dreamcoat.

Preceded by Metallica by Metallica	UK number one album 31 August 1991 – 13 September 1991	Succeeded by From Time to Time - The Singles Collection by Paul Young
