= Keith Jack =

British actor

Keith Jack (born 2 March 1988) is a British actor and singer. He was the runner-up on the BBC reality talent show Any Dream Will Do, which offered the chance to be the next West End Joseph for the hit musical Joseph and the Amazing Technicolor Dreamcoat by Andrew Lloyd Webber and Tim Rice. He lost out to Lee Mead in the final on 9 June 2007.

== Early life ==
Before his appearances on Any Dream Will Do, Jack was studying performance skills in Edinburgh and a HNC in Musical Theatre at Telford College, also in Edinburgh. Since winning the 2006 Chicago Rock Café Rock Idol contest, held in the English West Midlands, he has been a student of celebrity vocal coach Carrie Grant. Jack attended St. David's High School in Dalkeith, where he performed in various Christmas concerts and other events.

== Any Dream Will Do ==
Since the start of Any Dream Will Do, Jack was noted as a strong contender; his vocals in particular were praised very highly. The main criticisms directed at him were his diction and his physical appearance: some judges thought he looked 'too young' to play Joseph. However, by the end of the series, Jack was widely regarded as the strongest singer on the programme. John Barrowman and vocal coach Zoe Tyler in particular were full of praise. Barrowman said: "That was brilliant, brilliant, brilliant, son! You have a voice of gold." Tyler commented: "When I hear you sing now, you knock me for six."

Denise van Outen described Keith as a "Young John Barrowman", while Bill Kenwright called Keith's talents "frightening". The panel was particularly impressed with his performances of "Love Is All Around", "Always on My Mind," "Could It Be Magic" and "For Once in My Life".

=== Performances on Any Dream Will Do ===
- Show One – "Crazy Little Thing Called Love" by Queen
- Show Two – "Who Am I" by Will Young
- Show Three – "Crocodile Rock" by Elton John
- Show Four – "Love Is All Around" by Wet Wet Wet
- Show Five – "Always on My Mind" by Willie Nelson
- Show Six – "Brown Eyed Girl" by Van Morrison as well as "That's Life" by Frank Sinatra (group number; performed with Ben Ellis and Lewis Bradley)
- Show Seven – "Let Me Entertain You" by Robbie Williams
- Semi-final – "Could It Be Magic" by Barry Manilow and "Only You" from the musical Starlight Express (duet; performed with Ben Ellis)
- Final – "For Once in My Life" by Stevie Wonder, "Moondance" by Van Morrison and "Always on My Mind" (encore).

== Later career ==
Jack performed at the Picnic in the Parliament concert outside the Scottish Parliament on 30 June 2007. "As my first performance since the final, I am proud it will be not only in Scotland but on a day celebrating Scottish talent," he said.

On 28 June 2007, The Scotsman reported that Jack was into entering a record deal with Louis Walsh, the fruition of which was to be an album of pop, classical and theatrical music. This did not materialise, and Jack asked Adam Quest, his mentor and vocal coach, to try to broker a new recording deal on his behalf. Within a week, Jack was signed to John Mclaughlin's record label X-Phonics in Glasgow.

From October 2007, Keith was in Bill Kenwright's national touring production of Joseph, starring as the Narrator, alongside fellow Any Dream Will Do contestants Craig Chalmers (as Joseph) and Chris Barton (as Benjamin). A second tour followed in late summer 2009. When Mead's contract expired, Jack was asked if he wanted to take over. He rejected the offer, and continued to tour with Chalmers and Barton.

Jack recorded his debut album early in 2008. A charity single, "When a Child is Born" was released via download on 10 December 2007. "If an Angel falls from Heaven" was available to download from 8 December 2008.

In August 2008, Jack performed in the premiere of the musical Only the Brave at the Edinburgh Festival. In June 2008, he performed in the Choices for Life tour, for children in Primary 7 across Scotland. The same month, Jack performed at Bo'ness Children's Fair Day.

His debut album was released on 22 September that year, entitled This Time. Jack toured England and Scotland in September and October 2008 to promote the album. He also sang "Uptown Girl" with Daniel Boys and Ben James-Ellis on John Barrowman's album Music Music Music.

December 2008 through to January 2009 saw Jack in pantomime, playing the title role in Peter Pan, alongside Alan Fletcher (aka Dr. Karl Kennedy from Neighbours) at His Majesty's Theatre, Aberdeen.

On 31 December 2008, Jack performed at the Aberdeen Hogmanay Street Party, alongside Sandi Thom and Amy Macdonald.

Jack performed as part of Showstopppers! at Musical Theatre @ George Square as part of the Edinburgh Fringe on 17 August 2009. That year, appeared in pantomime at the Kings Theatre, Glasgow as Aladdin.

In Croydon, on 17 July 2010, Jack took over the coloured coat from Chalmers and began his debut performance as Joseph. From 2 December 2010 to 8 January 2011, Jack played the Prince in the Glasgow Kings Theatre production of Sleeping Beauty.

In 2012, Jack played Joseph in the UK tour, opposite Jennifer Potts as the narrator.

From 18 December 2012 to 6 January 2013, Jack played Prince Charming in Cinderella at the Whitley Bay Playhouse.

Jack finished in Joseph in May 2013, after six years in the musical (on and off), passing the role on to Ian "H" Watkins (of Steps). The following month, it was announced that Jack would be returning to the stage as the lead in a brand new musical, Sincerely, Mr Toad (about the life of author Kenneth Grahame), with Sell A Door Theatre Company.

Jack played The Prince at Ipswich Regent's pantomime production of Sleeping Beauty, which ran from 17 December 2016 until 2 January 2017. He joined Magic Beans in their 2017/18 production of Snow White at the Stag Theatre in Sevenoaks. He was also a guest vocalist touring with Joe McElderry to promote the latter's album, which also featured Ben James-Ellis and Sam Callahan.

In 2022, Jack joined the cast of Dreamcoat Stars, which also features several other actors who have played the role of Joseph. The production is currently touring the UK as of 2023.

Jack also is a co producer of John Barrowman’s UK tours.

=== Theatre credits ===
Year	Title	Role	Theatre	Location	Notes
2007	Joseph and the Amazing Technicolor Dreamcoat	Narrator	—N/a	UK national tour	
2008	Only The Brave	Charlie	George Square Theatre	Edinburgh Festival Fringe, Edinburgh	World premiere
2008-09	Peter Pan	Peter Pan	Her Majesty's Theatre	Aberdeen	Pantomime debut
2009	Joseph and the Amazing Technicolor Dreamcoat	Narrator	—N/a	UK national tour	
2009	Showstoppers!	Himself	George Square Theatre	Edinburgh Festival Fringe	
2009	Aladdin	Aladdin	King's Theatre	Glasgow	Pantomime
2010-13	Joseph and the Amazing Technicolor Dreamcoat	Joseph	—N/a	UK national tour	
2010-11	Sleeping Beauty	Prince Charming	King's Theatre	Glasgow	Pantomime
2012-13	Cinderella	Prince Charming	Whitley Bay Playhouse	Whitley Bay	
2013	Sincerely, Mr Toad	Alistair	Sell A Door Theatre Company	Edinburgh Festival Fringe	World premiere
2014	H.M.S Pinafore	Ralph Rackstraw	—N/a	UK national tour	
2016-17	Sleeping Beauty	Prince Charming	Regent Theatre	Ipswich	Pantomime
2017-18	Snow White and the Seven Dwarfs	The Stag Theatre	Sevenoaks	Pantomime	
2020	Fame	Nick	—N/a	UK national tour	
2022	Sunshine on Leith	Ally	Pitlochry Festival Theatre	Pitlochry	
2022	Noises Off	Freddie Fellowes	Pitlochry Festival Theatre	Pitlochry	
