= Emilie Autumn discography =

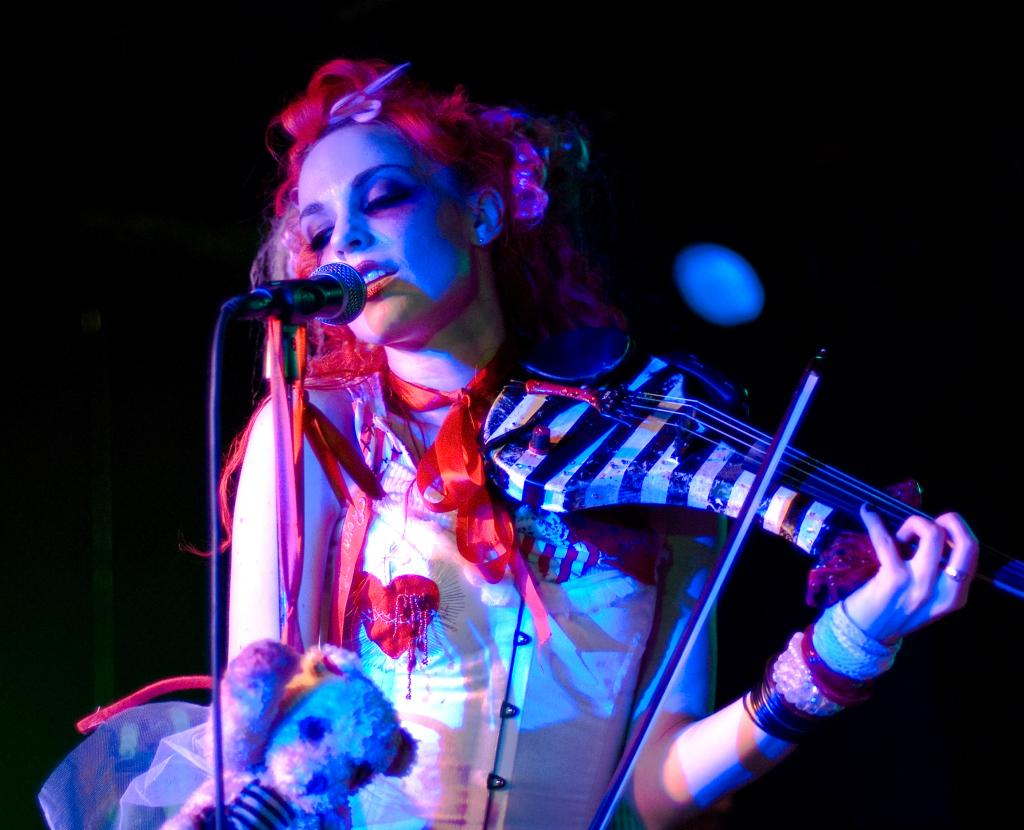
- Autumn in Frankfurt, 2007
- Studio albums: 4
- Extended plays: 6
- Singles: 3
- Music videos: 1
- Instrumental albums: 2
- Rarities: 1

This is the discography of Emilie Autumn.

== Albums ==
=== Studio albums ===
Year	Title
2003	Enchant: Released: February 26, 2003; Label: Traitor Records/Trisol Music Group; Format: CD
2006	Opheliac: Released: October 23, 2006; Label: Trisol Music Group; Format: CD
2012	Fight Like a Girl: Released: July 24, 2012; Label: The Asylum Emporium; Format: CD
2018	The Asylum For Wayward Victorian Girls: Behind the Musical: Released: September 22, 2018; Label: The Asylum Emporium; Format: MP3

=== Instrumental albums ===
- On a Day... (1997)
- Laced / Unlaced (2007)

=== Rarities albums ===
- A Bit o' This & That (2007)

=== Extended plays ===
- By the Sword (2001)
- Chambermaid (2001)
- Opheliac EP (2006)
- Liar / Dead Is the New Alive (2006)
- 4 o'Clock (2008)
- Girls Just Wanna Have Fun & Bohemian Rhapsody (2008)

== Singles ==
- Prick! Goes the Scorpion's Tale (on The Devil's Carnival soundtrack)
- Fight Like a Girl (2012)
- The Passenger (Iggy Pop cover, 2021)
- We Have Instructions (2022)
- Who's A Little Leech? (2022)
- Portraits (2022)

=== Music videos ===
- "Fight Like a Girl" (2013)

== Guest contributions ==
- Backing vocals and violin on the album America's Sweetheart (2003) by Courtney Love
- Backing vocals and violin on the album TheFutureEmbrace (2005) by Billy Corgan
- Song "Organ Grinder" on the European edition of the Saw III soundtrack (2006)
- Violin on the album The Dethalbum (2007) by Dethklok
- Remix version of "Dead Is the New Alive" on the international version of the Saw IV soundtrack (2007)
- Vocals and violin on the song "The Gates of Eternity" from the album All Mine Enemys Whispers (2008) by Attrition
- Violin on the track "UR A WMN NOW" on Otep's fourth album, Smash the Control Machine (2009)
- Vocals and violin on the song "Dry" by Die Warzau (2009)
- Vocals featured on the soundtrack for The Devil's Carnival as The Painted Doll, and additional violin (2012)
- Vocals featured on the soundtrack for Alleluia! The Devil's Carnival as The Painted Doll (2015)
