= Your Sugar Sits Untouched =

Studio album by Emilie Autumn
- Released: 2005
- Genre: Spoken word
- Length: ~75 minutes

Emilie Autumn chronology
Enchant (2002)	Your Sugar Sits Untouched (2005)	Opheliac (2006)

Your Sugar Sits Untouched is a partial re-release of American poet and singer-songwriter Emilie Autumn's 2001 poetry book, Across the Sky & Other Poems. In addition, it includes seven new poems and an audio CD of all of the book's 45 poems, spoken by Emilie Autumn and backed by her original music. A limited amount of 3000 copies were created for worldwide distribution, and is no longer in print.

== Track listing ==
=== Disc one ===
All poems written and performed by Emilie Autumn.

1. "Your Sugar Sits Untouched"
2. "Goodbye"
3. "The Day You Love"
4. "At What Point Does A Shakespeare Say"
5. "Blackbird Sonnets"
6. "Constant"
7. "Ghost"
8. "How to Break A Heart"
9. "Rant I"
10. "In Praise of Cyrano"
11. "So Many Fools"
12. "The Ballad of Mushroom Down"
13. "The One"
14. "Space"
15. "Alas (The Knight)"
16. "A Letter From A Friend"
17. "A Plea to the Dying"
18. "Close"
19. "Dreams"
20. "Everybody's Girl"
21. "Empty"
22. "Homesick Sonnets"
23. "Rant II"
24. "Little Boy"

=== Disc two ===
1. "Smirking Girl"
2. "Try My Best"
3. "Nearer Than You"
4. "The Muse"
5. "The Music I Heard Once"
6. "If You Could Only Know"
7. "Funny How Things Change"
8. "I Didn't Mean You"
9. "If"
10. "Visions"
11. "By the Sword"
12. "Didn't"
13. "If You Feel Better"
14. "Two Masks"
15. "What Right Have I"
16. "WOMAN"
17. "I Cried For You"
18. "Rapunzel Sonnets"
19. "Never Tasted Tears"
20. "Jump the Track"
21. "On Artistic Integrity"
22. "Manipulation"
