= Ulorin Vex =

British alternative model and artist

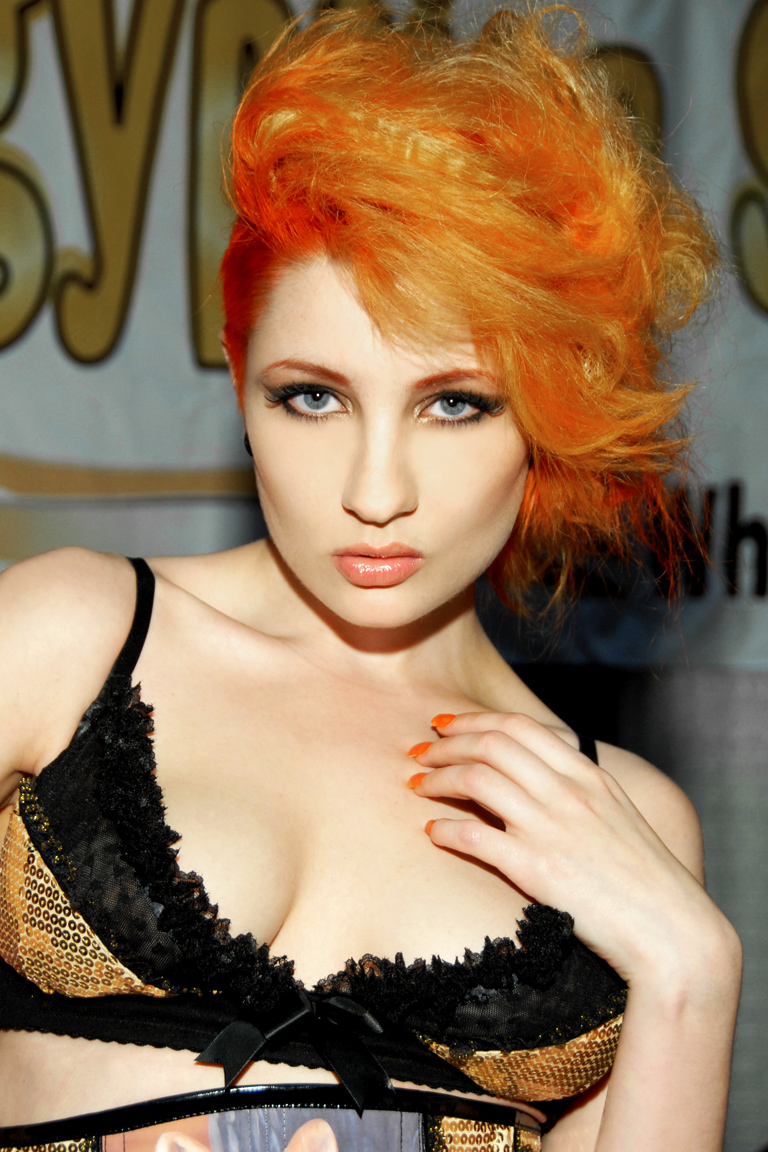
- Vex in 2010
- Born: Christiane Shillito; Newcastle upon Tyne, England
- Other name: Malady Charlotina
- Occupations: Alternative model; illustrator
- Modeling information
- Height: 5 ft 8.5 in (1.74 m)
- Hair color: Red (dyed)
- Eye color: Blue
- Website: Official website

Christiane Shillito, known professionally as Ulorin Vex and Malady Charlotina, is an English alternative model and illustrator based in Los Angeles, California. Her extensive list of credits include dozens of magazine features and covers, ad campaigns, billboards, and spans all genres from fashion to fetish and art nudes. She's also known for her dynamic and exaggerated posing.

Vex graduated from the University of Durham. She began her career as an alternative model shortly after, modeling collections for numerous latex clothing designers and appearing on stage at events such as the Skin Two Rubber Ball. British magazine Bizarre featured Vex in several issues, including a cover feature in issue 160 (February 2010) describing her as "alt girl royalty" after previously interviewing and featuring her in an article entitled "coming attractions" in issue 149 (April 2009). Other notable subculture magazine covers include American Gothic Beauty issues 21 (October 2006) and 30 (January 2010), France's Elegy issue 69 (June 2011) and the UK's Skin Two Latextra issue 37 (May 2013).

Vex began to branch out into more mainstream modeling work in 2008 when she was featured in two global ad campaigns for TIGI bedhead, including several hair magazine covers and billboards. She went on to model for other mainstream names including fashion features in Dazed and Confused issue 160 (April 2008) and an interview with Vice for the "showbiz issue".

It was around this time she also began to model regularly as a muse for world renowned hair dresser and award-winning avant garde artist Robert Masciave. Vex was featured in several of Masciave's hairdressing collections and runway shows and their images landed numerous magazine features for both photographic and hairdressing trade magazines. Other notable collaborators include photographer Steve Diet Goedde, with whom Vex has been shooting since 2007, multi-disciplinary artist and fetish photographer Aaron Hawks, and famed pinup artist Olivia De Berardinis, who has painted Vex for Sideshow Collectibles and Spirit Drawing: Tales Of The Phantasmagoric Skull. Vex also appeared as a guest speaker at WonderCon 2017 for a panel about Olivia's career in pinup art.

In 2011 a portrait of Vex was featured in the Beautiful People show at the Cabinet des Curieux gallery in Paris. The name of the show was a tribute to musician Marilyn Manson and was described as a celebration of the "cultural icons that are fabricating our contemporary reality". This included people such as Tim Burton, Dita Von Teese, Molly Crabapple and Lydia Lunch.

Vex joined American violinist Emilie Autumn on her spring 2008 tour as a stage performer and new addition to The Bloody Crumpets. She returned to Autumn's side in 2012 in order to perform in the music video for her song "Fight Like a Girl". and also appeared alongside Emilie in the 2016 movie Alleluia! The Devil's Carnival.

Vex has worked with Kate "Kato" Lambert, who named an ensemble, the "Vex" outfit, after her.

Vex is also an artist and illustrator under her legal name Christiane LJ Shillito, as well as the pseudonym Malady Charlotina. Her artwork was featured along with an interview in issue 176 of Bizarre (June 2011) which highlights the difference between the confident "vixen-esque beauties" of her illustrations and modeling images with someone who is actually "softly-spoken and shy in the flesh". The interviewer and author of the piece was curator and book publisher Bob Self and a copy of the magazine was included in his 2015 exhibition entitled "Baby Tattoo: Carnival of Astounding Art" at the Oceanside Museum of Art.

Another article focusing on the multi-layered aspects of Vex's modeling and art personas appeared a year later in Beautiful Bizarre magazine, which reveals the Malady Charlotina pseudonym is a play on words of a character from The Dancers at the End of Time. Although Vex has had some success as an artist, with a 2015 solo show at The Erotic Heritage Museum in Las Vegas as well as being part of several group shows at galleries such as La Luz de Jesus and Skotia Gallery in Los Angeles, she has yet to reach the same level of recognition in this arena as she has as a model.

Most recently she was interviewed by writer and art director Rantz Hoseley and a gallery of her work featured in issue 291 of Heavy Metal, the “Fetish Issue” (September 2018), where Vex reveals she is self-taught and states that her years of fetish and latex modeling have influenced her art. She also cites being influenced by artists including Egon Schiele, Hans Belmer, Michael Kaluta and the fierce female characters of Olivia De Berardinis. This same month Vex also had her artwork featured with an interview in Sinical magazine by Danny Stygion, who had previously interviewed Vex for a cover feature as a model in its fall 2013 issue. In this latest interview Vex reveals that her modeling output has slowed down considerably recently because of traumatic experiences in her personal life that left her with anxiety issues that directly affected her ability to model full-time. She also states it was a “blessing in disguise” and was the catalyst for her refocusing her creative energy into her own artwork, which had always been her ultimate intention.

== Portfolio ==
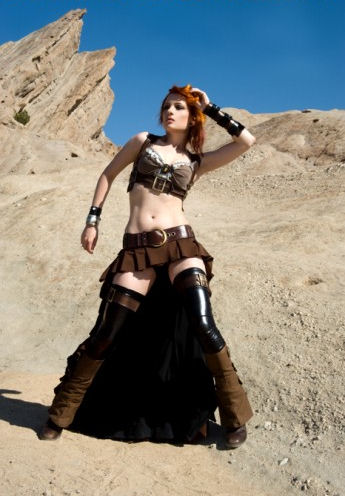
Ulorin Vex wearing the "Vex" outfit designed by Kato.

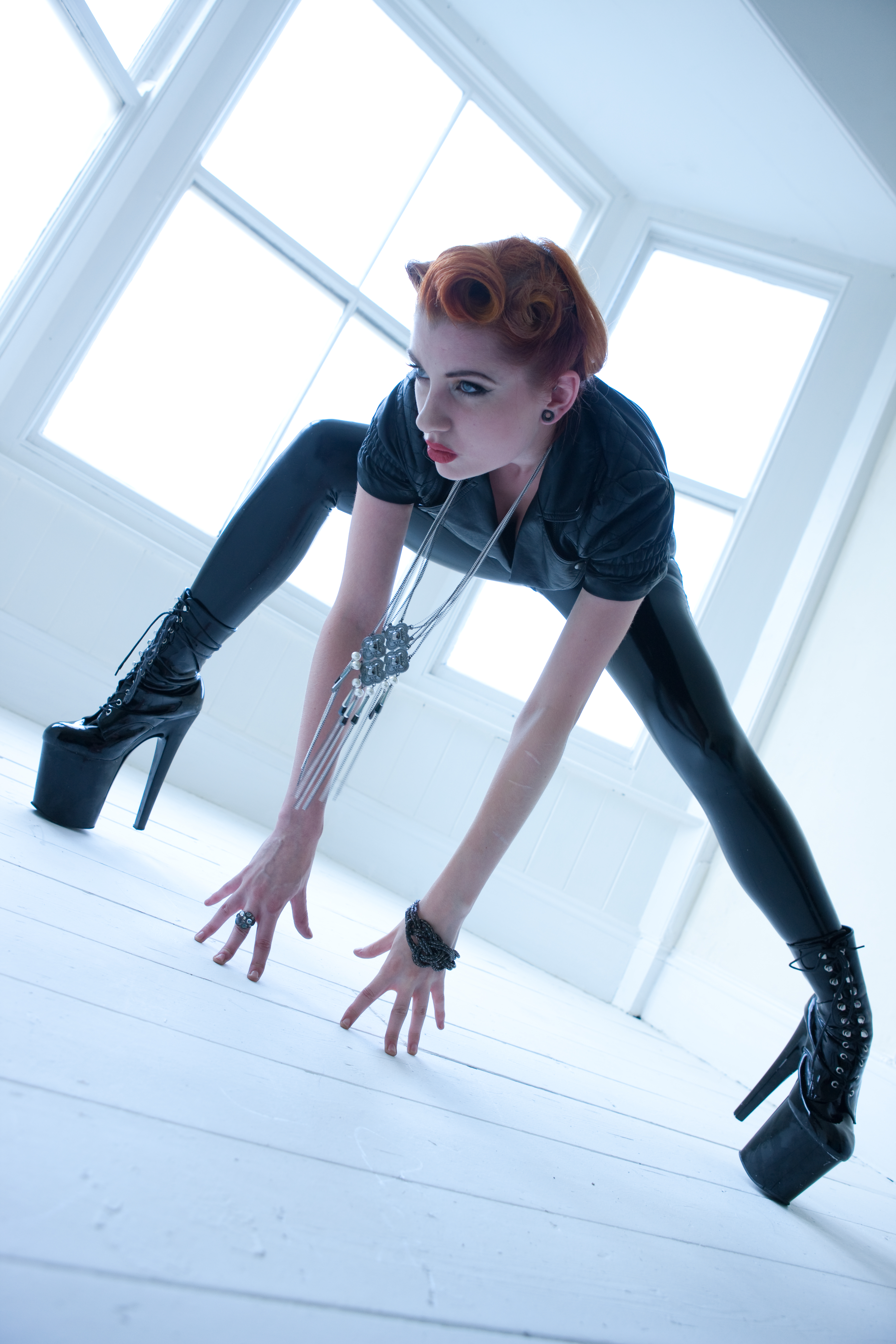
Natural light shot (2009)
