= Fight Like a Girl (Emilie Autumn album) =

Studio album by Emilie Autumn
- Released: July 24, 2012
- Recorded: 2010–2012
- Genre: Dark cabaret, rock opera, electronica, classical, electro-industrial
- Length: 64:31
- Label: The Asylum Emporium
- Producer: Emilie Autumn

Emilie Autumn chronology
| Girls Just Wanna Have Fun & Bohemian Rhapsody (2008) | Fight Like a Girl (2012) | The Asylum for Wayward Victorian Girls: Behind the Musical (2018) |

Singles from Fight Like a Girl
- 1. "Fight Like a Girl" Released: April 11, 2012

Professional ratings
Review scores
| Source | Rating |
|---|---|
| Metal Blast | 4.5/5 stars |
| Espy Rock | 9 |

Fight Like a Girl is the third studio album released by Emilie Autumn. It is a concept album, based on her novel The Asylum for Wayward Victorian Girls. She has referred to the album as a preview of her forthcoming full-length musical based on the book.

== Release and promotion ==
As early as 2010, Autumn hinted that she was working on the album, revealing the acronym "F.L.A.G." on Twitter in June of that year, before later announcing the full title.

Autumn scheduled three tours in 2012 to promote the album, each referred to either as the "Fight Like A Girl tour" or the "FLAG tour", the first throughout North and South America in January and February, and the next two in the UK and Europe in March and April. Part of the North and South American tour was postponed to November and December of that year due to an unspecified illness.

Starting on March 3, 2012, and beginning with the song "We Want Them Young", Autumn began releasing the official lyrics to the songs through her blog.

On April 11, 2012, the title track "Fight Like a Girl" was released as a single through Autumn's website as a digital download, featuring the song "Time For Tea" as a b-side.

The full album was released on July 24, 2012 as both a physical CD and an mp3 download.

=== Music video ===
In 2013, Autumn produced and starred in her first ever music video for the song "Fight Like A Girl", directed by Darren Lynn Bousman, and also featuring Marc Senter, Dayton Callie, and Autumn's longtime collaborators and back-up dancers Veronica Varlow, Maggie Lally (also known as Captain Maggot), and Ulorin Vex. In the video, Autumn and several other "asylum inmates" take revenge on and murder a group of men they have been forced to perform for. Autumn is then dragged off stage by the asylum guards and taken back to her cell, implying the previous events were a hallucination or fantasy. At the end of the video, one of the guards, portrayed by Senter, forcefully kisses her before locking her away, and it is revealed that, in doing so, he has slipped her a key.

== Music and lyrics ==
As an adaptation of The Asylum for Wayward Victorian Girls, many of the songs directly reference the events of the novel, sometimes even quoting the book directly. "Time for Tea" depicts the climactic scene of the novel, an event known as the Tea Party Massacre, where the inmates rise up against the doctors and take over the Asylum; "Girls! Girls! Girls!" depicts what is known in the book as "The Ophelia Gallery", where the inmates of the Asylum are exhibited as a sideshow attraction; and "I Don't Understand" portrays the main character's brief relationship with a sympathetic photographer. The track "4 o'Clock (Reprise)" is an instrumental reworking of the title track of Autumn's 2008 EP 4 O'Clock.

== Reception ==
The album received mixed to positive reviews, with much of the critique concerning the clarity of the album's plot. Scott Wilson of espyrock.com said of the album, "it is theatrical, epic, empowering, scary, depressing, catchy, accessible, and most importantly, brilliant." Katherine Tullett of The Independent Voice praised the album's diversity of emotion and genre, saying "There’s not only one musical genre in the album, there’re a lot, so it makes the album rich in sound." J Salmeron of Metal Blast criticized Autumn's choice to voice all of the album's various characters herself, stating, "While it might be cheaper to record every part by yourself, the story (which, as a result, is hard to follow) would be conveyed in a much clearer way if you get at least ONE other person to do part of the dialogue," but also praised the music and lyrics, concluding, "FLAG is a breath of fresh air." Christine Caruana of Loud Magazine commented, "Fight Like a Girl is not the place to start for newcomers. To understand and truly appreciate this record, you will need to have heard Enchant and Opheliac, read her novel and appreciate her story," while also calling it, "her most personal and intimate album to date."

== Track listing ==
All tracks are written by Emilie Autumn.

| No. | Title | Length |
|---|---|---|
| 1. | "Fight Like a Girl" | 5:24 |
| 2. | "Time for Tea" | 4:03 |
| 3. | "4 o'Clock (Reprise)" | 1:21 |
| 4. | "What Will I Remember?" | 2:54 |
| 5. | "Take the Pill" | 5:17 |
| 6. | "Girls! Girls! Girls!" | 6:14 |
| 7. | "I Don't Understand" | 2:12 |
| 8. | "We Want Them Young" | 2:47 |
| 9. | "If I Burn" | 5:31 |
| 10. | "Scavenger" | 6:59 |
| 11. | "Gaslight" | 5:09 |
| 12. | "The Key" | 2:12 |
| 13. | "Hell Is Empty" | 1:11 |
| 14. | "Gaslight (Reprise)" | 2:13 |
| 15. | "Goodnight, Sweet Ladies" | 4:44 |
| 16. | "Start Another Story" | 1:57 |
| 17. | "One Foot in Front of the Other" | 4:32 |
| Total length: | | 64:31 |

== Personnel ==
- Emilie Autumn - music, lyrics, recording
- Ulrich Wild - mixing and mastering
