= By the Sword (EP) =

EP by Emilie Autumn
- Released: 2001
- Genre: Electronic music
- Length: 24:15
- Label: Traitor Records

Emilie Autumn chronology
Chambermaid (2001)	By the Sword (2001)	Enchant (2003)

"By the Sword" is a charity single released by Emilie Autumn in response to the events of September 11, 2001. All proceeds from the sales for the release were donated to AmeriCares and the American Red Cross. The single was released on Autumn's own label, Traitor, which no longer exists.

All songs can be found on other releases: "By the Sword" and "I Know It's Over" are featured on A Bit o' This & That, "Castle Down" is found on Enchant, and "Willow" is on Laced/Unlaced.

== Concept and recording ==
Autumn described the concept for the title track as everyday heroes who fight for what is right joining together, explaining, "When I talk about the Round Table and such, I'm speaking metaphorically of course. It's like, after 9/11, you might have gone into a shelter where an old woman was helping to feed parentless children, and for one moment, you might have looked at her and seen her in a breastplate with a sword hanging by her side. The sword is symbolic. It doesn't mean violence. It means strength." She said the process of writing and recording the song, which was done the same day as the September 11 attacks, was "instinctual", stating "I felt I needed to help before I could allow myself the luxury to grieve."

== Track listing ==
All tracks are written by Emilie Autumn, except where noted.

No.	Title	Writer(s)	Length
1.	"By the Sword"		5:11
2.	"Castle Down"		3:55
3.	"Willow"		8:22
4.	"I Know It's Over" (Music Video)	Morrissey, Johnny Marr	6:47
Total length:			24:15

== Personnel ==
- Emilie Autumn – vocals, producer
