= Terrance Zdunich =

American artist (born 1976)

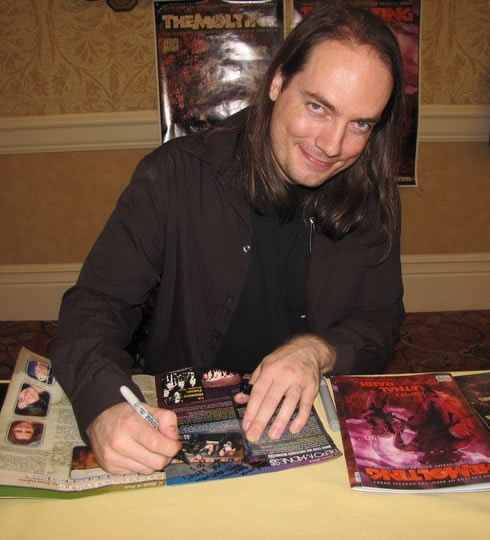
- Zdunich in 2010
- Born: July 23, 1976 (age 50); California, U.S.
- Education: Otis College of Art and Design
- Known for: Artist, singer, actor, writer, composer, producer, illustrator
- Notable work: Repo! The Genetic Opera (2008); The Devil's Carnival (2012-15); American Murder Song (2016-26)

Terrance Zdunich (/sˈduːnɪtʃ/; born July 23, 1976) is an American artist, singer, actor, writer, composer, producer, illustrator and storyboard artist. He is most known for his role as GraveRobber in Repo! The Genetic Opera, as Lucifer in The Devil's Carnival films, and Mister Tender in American Murder Song.

== Early career ==
After graduating from Otis College of Art & Design in 1998, Zdunich took a job at Sony Animation drawing storyboards on such animated television shows as Roughnecks: The Starship Troopers Chronicles and Max Steel. Creatively frustrated, he left animation in 2002 to pursue freelance illustration gigs, including work on Fox's television series Bones. As a storyboard artist he worked on live-action films such as What We Do Is Secret about the punk band the Germs, and Into The Wild, directed by Sean Penn. He also worked part-time teaching drawing and painting in Calabasas, California.

While transitioning from studio work in animation to life as a freelance artist, Terrance enrolled in an acting class at the South Coast Repertory Theatre where he met future collaborator Darren Smith.

== Career ==
=== Repo! The Genetic Opera (1999-2008) ===
Together, Zdunich and Smith formed "The Gallery" in 1999, and the two began writing and performing theatrical rock music in the form of ten-minute operas. As a duo they played the Los Angeles club/theatre scene. Due to the positive response for their first ten-minute opera, The Necro-merchant's Debt, they decided to expand the piece into a full-length theatrical format which was later renamed Repo! The Genetic Opera.

In 2001, Zdunich and Smith assembled a small group of actors and musicians and began performing Repo as a one-act set at clubs in Los Angeles, California. In 2002, Repo: The Genetic Opera received its first full-length staging in Hollywood, California at the John Raitt Theatre with Darren Lynn Bousman directing. The original engagement also featured Zdunich in the role as the narrator "GraveRobber." ‘Repo' was remounted again in 2004 at West Hollywood's SplitID Theatre, and finally, for the last time, it was seen on stage in 2005 at the Off-Off Broadway Wings Theatre in NYC with Zdunich both acting and directing.

Zdunich, Bousman and Smith put together a ten-minute short film of Repo starring Zdunich, Shawnee Smith, Michael Rooker & J LaRose in 2006 . The short film was screened for agents and producers at Endeavor Agency in Beverly Hills, CA. Lionsgate and Twisted Pictures eventually brought Repo to the big screen in 2008, which starred Anthony Head, Alexa Vega, Paul Sorvino, and Sarah Brightman. Zdunich maintained his acting role as "GraveRobber" and assumed new roles as well, which included drawing the film's animated sequences and becoming an associate producer. Despite the film's limited theatrical release to 11 theaters in America, Repo has gained an international cult fan base and was ranked amongst the top 25 cult movies of all time by a Rolling Stone readers' poll Zdunich continued to travel the US attending "shadowcast" performances of Repo at conventions and private events.

=== The Molting Comic (2009-12) ===
In 2009, in an effort to return to his drawing roots, Zdunich began work on a solo project, an independent comic book series dubbed The Molting. Initially earmarked for 12 chapters, 7 were ultimately published from 2009 to 2012. Zdunich wrote the story arc in its entirety before a single page was drawn. He released a new issue every few months and ultimately released seven issues. He completed the work with the help of letterer Oceano Ransford and colorists Brian Johnson & Molly Rodman. Zdunich admitted the series is in part based on his real life experiences growing up in Southern California. He also catalogs his artistic process in a blog series entitled "Molting with the Molting." The seven chapters were: Guilty Susie, The Happiest Place on Earth, Ootheca, Lethal Raids, Mother's Day, Allied Forces and Supernatural Aid.

On May 28, 2010, at the Sacramento Horror Film Festival, Zdunich debuted the first in a series of weekly online instructional videos, a project entitled The Tutor, described as a "Bob Ross meets Ted Bundy" school of art. As The Tutor, Terrance taught viewers how to paint a still life. The Tutor encouraged audience participation through "homework"– video and still art assignments provided in The Tutor's accompanying blog. On Saturday, October 23, 2010, The Tutor project concluded in an event held in Hollywood, California called The Tutor's Gallery. The event included a live performance by Zdunich and an art show of the work created by his students.

=== The Devil's Carnival (2012-15) ===
In 2012 Zdunich and Bousman, along with composer Saar Hendelman, released The Devil's Carnival, a 56-minute independent film designed to challenge conventional distribution models. The film featuring stars from film and television, like Sean Patrick Flanery and Dayton Callie, as well as rock stars Emilie Autumn and Ivan Moody. During the initial release, The Devil's Carnival was only shown at exclusive one night engagements in 60 cities across the U.S. and Canada. The road tour broke with the normal film viewing experience by including meet and greets with the cast, Q&As, costume contests, live sideshow acts and behind the scenes footage.

Due to the success of the first film and road tour, Zdunich reprised his role as Lucifer in 2015 Alleluia! The Devil's Carnival. Along with returning talent, Alleluia! The Devil's Carnival featured Adam Pascal, Barry Bostwick, David Hasselhoff, Tech N9ne and Ted Neely.

A tour followed the second film, though suffered from legal issues and what Zdunich described as "illogical tour routing, poor ground management and worse communication". The issues led to two shows being cancelled. Zdunich revealed in a 2016 blog post that Alleluia! might be the end of the project, citing legal and financial difficulties. He added: "It may be. But I hope not."

=== American Murder Song (2016-21, 2025-) ===
On the Alleluia! road tour, Zdunich announced a new musical collaboration with composer Saar Hendelman called American Murder Song, a collection of original murder ballads set in different time periods of American history.

American Murder Song's debut ballads are set in 1816 during the Year Without A Summer, when severe climate abnormalities lowered global temperatures and devastated American farmlands. The Year Without A Summer was released as 4 extended play albums, multiple online videos and a tour. The videos introduced characters from the songs, including "Pretty Lavinia," about America's first purported female serial killer, Lavinia Fisher. The videos featured performances by cult music stars like Arch Enemy's Alissa White-Gluz as Pretty Lavinia, Aurelio Voltaire as lothario wife-killer Unwed Henry, and Chibi, front woman of The Birthday Massacre, as Sweet Rosalie, an "escaped mental patient who leaves a trail of dead in her wake."

The duo began what would become a series of tours across the United States in 2016, continuing intermittently until slowed by the arrival of the Coronavirus pandemic in 2020.

In 2017, Hendelman and Zdunich announced that the theme for their second year of murder ballads with American Murder Song would be the Donner Party, the infamous American pioneers who got stuck in the snowy Sierra Nevada Mountains and resorted to cannibalism. They produced a The Donner Party album, a series of The Twilight Zone-styled videos, and a second tour.

Zdunich and Hendelman announced the next phase of American Murder Song, focusing on the crimes of H. H. Holmes at the 1893 world's fair. The album released later that year as The Killing Place. The pair performed several livestreamed concerts through 2020 and 2021.

== Themes ==
Zdunich regularly attests to his love of the macabre and produces work normally dubbed "horror." From his earliest pieces, such as the illustrated God & the Box (seen on his website), his work has always prominently featured bugs, especially cockroaches. His website boasts flash representations of the critters with factoids about the animals and he maintains pet roaches as a hobby. His fondness for the creatures, he says, comes from their generally misunderstood nature and their tenacity, which are characteristics he identifies with.

== Awards and honors ==
- Fangirltastic's Mr. November 2008
- Scary Stud of the Year 2008
- Most songs written for one film
- Fantasia Film Festival Most Innovative Film 2008
- Comic Related Best Horror Comic Series 2010
- Rondo Hatton Classic Horror Special Recognition Award 2010 for The Tutor

== Credits ==
=== Bibliography ===
==== The Molting Comic ====
- Gulty Susie (2009)
- The Happiest Place on Earth (2009)
- Ootheca (2010)
- Lethal Raids (2010)
- Mother's Day (2010)
- Allied Forces (2011)
- Supernatural Aid (2012)

==== Fantastique Magazine ====
- "Fantastic Finds: Creeps & Dames", Fantastique No. 1, July 2009
- "Fantastic Finds: To The Crystal Chamber!", Fantastique No. 2, August 2009
- "Fantastic Finds: Adult Toys That Require Batteries", Fantastique No. 3, October 2009

=== Filmography ===
==== Actor ====
- Repo! The Genetic Opera (2008) – GraveRobber
- The Devil's Carnival (2012) – Lucifer
- Alleluia! The Devil's Carnival (2015) – Lucifer
- American Murder Song (2016–21) – Mister Tender

==== Writer ====
- Repo! The Genetic Opera (2008)
- The Devil's Carnival (2012)
- Alleluia! The Devil's Carnival (2015)

==== Composer ====
- Repo! The Genetic Opera (2008) (with Darren Smith)
- The Devil's Carnival (2012) (with Saar Hendelman)
- Alleluia! The Devil's Carnival (2015) (with Saar Hendelman)
- American Murder Song: I. Dawn (2016) (with Saar Hendelman)
- American Murder Song: II. Providence (2016) (with Saar Hendelman)
- American Murder Song: III. The Reckoning (2016) (with Saar Hendelman)
- American Murder Song: IV. Wake (2017) (with Saar Hendelman)
- American Murder Song: The Donner Party (2017) (with Saar Hendelman)
- American Murder Song: The Killing Place (2018) (with Saar Hendelman)
- American Murder Song: The Seven Deadly Sinners (2025) (with Saar Hendelman)

==== Producer ====
- Repo! The Genetic Opera (2008)
- The Devil's Carnival (2012)

==== Illustrator ====
- Repo! The Genetic Opera (2008)(comic book sequences)

==== Storyboard artist ====
- Heat Vision and Jack (TV) (1999) (uncredited)
- Roughnecks: The Starship Troopers Chronicles (4 episodes)
- The Great American Office Worker (2000)
- Bedazzled (2000)
- BigLove (2001)
- Max Steel (2001, two episodes: "Shadows"; "Sphinxes")
- Special Unit 2 (2001, one episode: "The Brothers") (uncredited)
- PC and the Web (2001)
- I Left Me (2004) (uncredited)
- Bones (2006, one episode: "The Superhero in the Alley")
- What We Do Is Secret (2007)
- Into the Wild (2007) (uncredited)
- Powder Blue (2009) (uncredited)
- Firedog (2010)
- The Barrens (2012)

=== Discography ===
- The Necromerchant's Debt (3-track teaser, November 13, 2001)
- Repo! The Genetic Opera: Selections from the Premiere Cast (7-track album, October 1, 2002)
- Pre-Surgery Sampler (7-track teaser, July 24, 2008)
- Repo! The Genetic Opera Soundtrack (September 30, 2008)
- Repo! The Genetic Opera Deluxe Edition (February 27, 2009)
- The Devil's Carnival (April 3, 2012)
- The Devil's Carnival Expanded Soundtrack (October 23, 2012)
- Alleluia! The Devil's Carnival Soundtrack (August 7, 2015)
- American Murder Song: I. Dawn (May 9, 2016)
- American Murder Song: II. Providence (June 26, 2016)
- American Murder Song: III. The Reckoning (August 27, 2016)
- American Murder Song: IV. Wake (February 11, 2017)
- American Murder Song: The Donner Party (August 1, 2017)
- American Murder Song: The Killing Place (November 13, 2018)
