= The Last Days of Frankie the Fly =

- DVD cover
- Directed by: Peter Markle
- Screenplay by: Dayton Callie
- Produced by: Elie Samaha
- Starring: Dennis Hopper; Michael Madsen; Kiefer Sutherland; Daryl Hannah
- Cinematography: Phil Parmet
- Edited by: David Campling
- Music by: George S. Clinton
- Production companies: Nu Image; Phoenician Films; Blueline
- Distributed by: Nu Image
- Release dates: October 24, 1996 (UK); March 15, 1997 (Santa Barbara Film Festival)
- Running time: 95 minutes
- Country: United States
- Language: English

The Last Days of Frankie the Fly is a 1996 crime film directed by Peter Markle, written by Dayton Callie and starring Dennis Hopper, Michael Madsen, Kiefer Sutherland and Daryl Hannah.

== Plot ==
Frankie (Dennis Hopper) is a leg man for the mob, and works for Sal (Michael Madsen) and his sidekick, Vic (Dayton Callie). Frankie goes to the set of a porno one day, directed by his friend Joey (Kiefer Sutherland), a NYU film school graduate who owes Sal money. Frankie immediately becomes infatuated with Margaret (Daryl Hannah), a former junkie who wants to become a serious actress. Once a good girl who came to Los Angeles to pursue an acting career, tough situations led her to do drugs and prostitution. Frankie becomes fixated on saving Margaret from the path she's on and keeping her from Sal.

== Cast ==
- Dennis Hopper as Frankie "The Fly"
- Daryl Hannah as Margaret
- Kiefer Sutherland as Joey
- Michael Madsen as Sal
- Dayton Callie as Vic
- Charles Carroll as Thug
- Jack McGee as Jack
- Karen Roeas as Sal's Girl
- Bert Rosario as Miguel
- Adam Scott as Race Track Valet
- David "Shark" Fralick as Porno Actor
