= Opheliac =

2006 album by Emilie Autumn

Studio album by Emilie Autumn
- Released: September 1, 2006
- Recorded: Mad Villain Studios, Chicago
- Genres: Darkwave; Dark cabaret; electro-industrial
- Length: 86:30
- Label: Trisol Music Group

Emilie Autumn chronology
Enchant (2003)	Opheliac (2006)	Liar / Dead is the New Alive (2007)

Professional ratings
Review scores
Source	Rating
Allmusic	3.5/5 stars
Sputnikmusic	3.5/5 stars

Opheliac is the second studio album by Emilie Autumn. Originally released on September 1, 2006, by Trisol Music Group, and recorded at Mad Villain Studios in Chicago, Illinois, it was her first album to receive widespread distribution around the world.

== Release and promotion ==
The album Opheliac was preceded by the Opheliac EP, released in Spring 2006. Released through Autumn's own independent label, Traitor Records, this was a preview of the full-length album, and featured the first six tracks plus "Marry Me" and "Thank God I'm Pretty", the latter as a hidden track following the former. However, track 5 "I Want My Innocence Back" does not play on any copies of the EP, due to a manufacturing error. Earlier that year, on January 12, Autumn appeared on the WGN Chicago Morning Show to promote the album, and on January 13 performed an "Opheliac album preview show" at the Double Door in Chicago.

Opheliac was originally released as a limited edition digipak in Europe on September 1, 2006, and worldwide on September 22, 2006, to coincide with Autumn's birthday.

As of August 6, 2008, Autumn announced that she would be releasing Opheliac nationwide in music stores across the US on October 7, 2008. The US release features exclusive tracks, such as "The Art of Suicide - Acoustic" and out-takes from the Opheliac recording sessions.

After Autumn parted ways with Trisol, a third issuing of Opheliac, entitled The Deluxe Edition, was released by The End Records on October 27, 2009, to coincide with her first American tour.

== Critical reception ==
The album received mixed-to-positive reviews. Greg Prato of AllMusic commented, "It's easy to detect similarities at times between Autumn and such renowned female artists as Kate Bush and Tori Amos [...], but when you come across the electronic/symphonic "Gothic Lolita" and the swirling "Let the Record Show," Autumn sheds her influences and finds her own original voice." Alissa Ordabai of HardRockHaven.net said of the album, "[...]Autumn’s voice is alternately sweetly pitch-perfect and ruggedly punky, mirroring perfectly the conflict between chaos and order that’s at the centre of her act", and, "After all, under all of her grotesque buffoonery and a desire to shock hides a shrewd knack for writing a perfect pop song and vocal chops that can carry through and deliver any message she chooses – from deliberately neurotic to artfully vacuous."

== Lyrics and themes ==
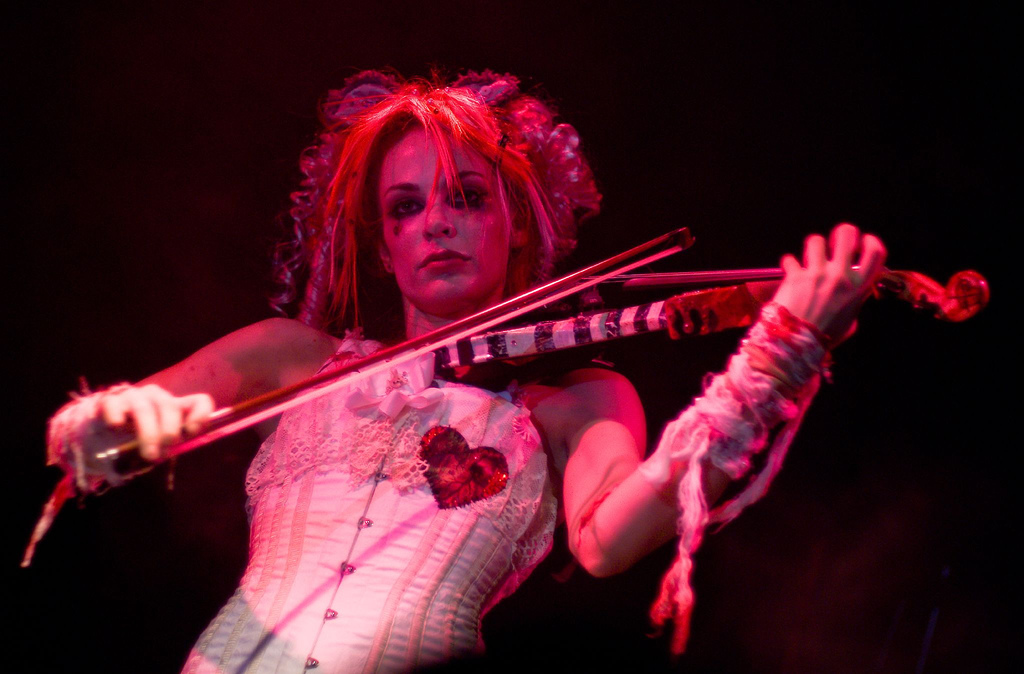
Autumn performing a song from "Opheliac" in Germany, 2007.

The word Opheliac is derived from the character Ophelia from the Shakespeare play Hamlet. Autumn explained:

"Opheliac" is word I childishly made up to explain the condition of a person having the characteristics of "Ophelia" and the "Ophelia" archetype. While the original Ophelia did indeed go "mad", it was not primarily caused by her boyfriend knocking off her dad, but rather by not only Hamlet but also all the men in her life manipulating and pushing her to the point of no alternative. I didn't exactly name the album after her as much as I named it after myself. As the truest "Opheliac" I know, this album is my story from beginning to end. Listen thoroughly and you'll know more about me than my closest friends, this being because I generally write songs about things I would never tell a living soul.

The album, largely written and recorded in the wake of Autumn's hospitalization due to bipolar disorder, touches on themes ranging from mental illness, suicide, and child abuse, as well as societal expectations of women and misogyny. Autumn has described the album as being "about women, water, and madness", stating that every song on the album contains some reference to water or drowning. She has also described the album as her "mad scene", referring to the famous scene in Act IV of Hamlet in which Ophelia, shortly before drowning herself, seems to go "mad", handing out flowers and singing songs. Autumn also makes frequent use of literary allusions, both to Shakespeare and to other "Opheliac"-type characters; for instance the song "Shalott" is based on the poem "The Lady of Shalott" by Alfred, Lord Tennyson.

Autumn has said that the lyrics to the song "Liar" were largely not written by her, but were instead taken nearly word for word from love letters written to her by an ex-boyfriend. The song also serves a reference to a scene in Hamlet in which Ophelia is forced to return Hamlet's love letters and he denies having ever written them.

"The Art of Suicide" includes a critique of the popular song "Gloomy Sunday"; specifically the fact that some English versions of the song have a "second ending", in which the protagonist wakes up from a bad dream and no longer wants to commit suicide.

== Track listing ==
All tracks are written by Emilie Autumn, except where noted.

No.	Title	Length
1.	"Opheliac"	5:33
2.	"Swallow"	6:15
3.	"Liar"	6:01
4.	"The Art of Suicide"	5:32
5.	"I Want My Innocence Back"	3:48
6.	"Misery Loves Company"	4:28
7.	"God Help Me"	5:58
8.	"Shalott"	4:04
9.	"Gothic Lolita"	6:03
10.	"Dead Is the New Alive"	5:04
11.	"I Know Where You Sleep"	3:15
12.	"Let the Record Show"	3:54
Total length:		59:55

Bonus Disc
No.	Title	Writer(s)	Length
1.	"Dominant"		3:47
2.	"306"		5:36
3.	"Thank God I'm Pretty"		4:01
4.	"Marry Me"		4:50
5.	"Largo for Violin"	Johann Sebastian Bach	4:06
6.	"Poem: How to Break a Heart"		1:01
7.	"Poem: Ghost"		2:38
8.	"Poem: At What Point Does a Shakespeare Say?"		0:36
Total length:			26:35

In addition to the audio tracks, Opheliac features live concert footage, clips from her performance of "Misery Loves Company" on the WGN Morning Show on January 12, 2006, and four short video clips entitled "Inside the Asylum: Lessons in Being a Wayward Victorian Girl".

== Opheliac: The Deluxe Edition ==
Opheliac (The Deluxe Edition)

Studio album by Emilie Autumn
- Released: October 27, 2009
- Recorded: Mad Villain Studios, Chicago
- Genres: Dark cabaret, electronica, classical, electro-industrial
- Length: 1:58:14
- Label: The End Records

Emilie Autumn chronology
Girls Just Wanna Have Fun & Bohemian Rhapsody (2008)	Opheliac (The Deluxe Edition) (2009)	Fight Like a Girl (2012)

=== Track listing ===
All tracks are written by Emilie Autumn, except where noted.

The Deluxe Edition: Disc One
No.	Title	Length
1.	"Opheliac"	5:33
2.	"Swallow"	6:15
3.	"Liar"	6:01
4.	"The Art of Suicide"	5:32
5.	"I Want My Innocence Back"	3:48
6.	"Misery Loves Company"	4:28
7.	"God Help Me"	5:58
8.	"Shalott"	4:04
9.	"Gothic Lolita"	6:03
10.	"Dead Is the New Alive"	5:04
11.	"I Know Where You Sleep"	3:15
12.	"Let the Record Show"	3:54
13.	""Opheliac" Recording Out-Takes"	4:11
Total length:		64:06

The Deluxe Edition: Disc Two
No.	Title	Writer(s)	Length
1.	"Thank God I'm Pretty"		4:01
2.	"Dominant"		3:47
3.	"306"		5:36
4.	"Gloomy Sunday"	Rezső Seress	3:22
5.	"Asleep"	Morrissey, Johnny Marr	2:26
6.	"Mad Girl" (Acoustic Version)		3:50
7.	"The Art of Suicide" (Acoustic Version)		5:45
8.	"Thank God I'm Pretty" (Shoegaze Version)		4:29
9.	"Largo for Violin"	Johann Sebastian Bach	4:06
10.	"Marry Me"		4:50
11.	"Excerpt from The Asylum for Wayward Victorian Girls"		1:40
12.	"Interview with EA"		4:46
13.	"Poem: How to Break a Heart"		1:01
14.	"Miss Lucy Had Some Leeches"		2:20
Total length:			51:59

== Album Credits ==
- Emilie Autumn - Vocals, Violin, Audio Production
- Inkydust - Audio Engineer, Mixing

== The Opheliac Companion ==
The Opheliac Companion

Studio album (commentary) by Emilie Autumn
- Released: August 2009
- Recorded: Mad Villain Studios, Chicago
- Genre: Commentary
- Length: 7:29:24

In August 2009, Autumn released a companion "album" to Opheliac, consisting of an approximately eight-hour long director's commentary style interview/chat between Autumn and her "sound guy" Inkydust. The discussion covers everything from the equipment used during production, to musical composition, to Autumn's writing process and inspirations behind the lyrics.

=== Track listing ===
The Opheliac Companion
No.	Title	Writer(s)	Length
1.	"Intro"	Emilie Autumn, Inkydust	4:49
2.	"Opheliac"	Emilie Autumn, Inkydust	1:06:04
3.	"Swallow"	Emilie Autumn, Inkydust	34:10
4.	"Liar"	Emilie Autumn, Inkydust	47:03
5.	"The Art of Suicide"	Emilie Autumn, Inkydust	46:04
6.	"I Want My Innocence Back"	Emilie Autumn, Inkydust	29:53
7.	"Interlude"	Emilie Autumn, Inkydust	16:34
8.	"Misery Loves Company"	Emilie Autumn, Inkydust	14:08
9.	"God Help Me"	Emilie Autumn, Inkydust	17:07
10.	"Shalott"	Emilie Autumn, Inkydust	16:32
11.	"Gothic Lolita"	Emilie Autumn, Inkydust	1:36:04
12.	"Dead Is the New Alive"	Emilie Autumn, Inkydust	20:59
13.	"I Know Where You Sleep"	Emilie Autumn, Inkydust	14:21
14.	"Let the Record Show"	Emilie Autumn, Inkydust	23:17
15.	"Ending"	Emilie Autumn, Inkydust	2:19
Total length:			7:29:24
