= Emilie Autumn =

American musician

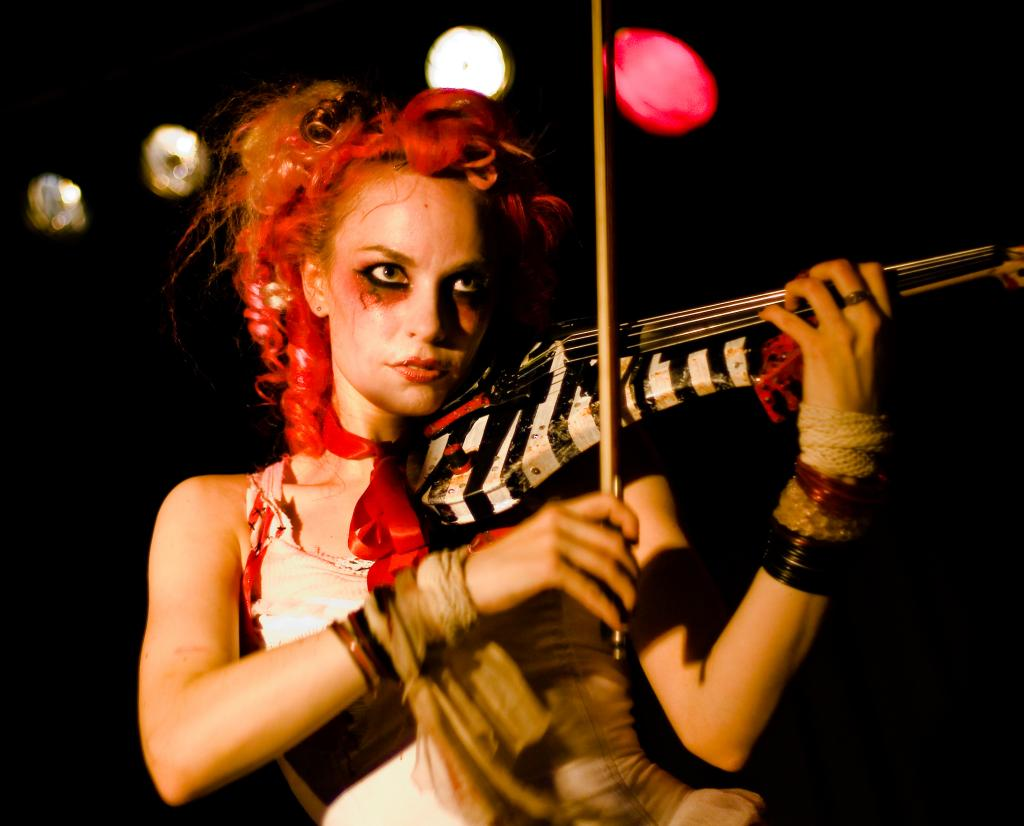
- Autumn performing live at Nachtleben in 2007

Background information
- Born: September 22, 1979 (age 47); Los Angeles, California, U.S.
- Genres: Classical; electronica; industrial
- Occupations: Singer; songwriter; musician; writer; poet; author
- Instruments: Vocals; violin; harpsichord
- Years active: 1997–present
- Labels: Traitor; Trisol; The End; The Asylum Emporium
- Website: www.emilieautumn.com

Emilie Autumn (born September 22, 1979) is an American singer-songwriter, poet, author, and violinist. Autumn's musical style is described by her as "Fairy Pop", "Fantasy Rock" or "Victoriandustrial". It is influenced by glam rock and from plays, novels, and history, particularly the Victorian era. Performing with her all-female backup dancers The Bloody Crumpets, Autumn incorporates elements of classical music, cabaret, electronica, and glam rock with theatrics, and burlesque.

Growing up in Malibu, California, Autumn began learning the violin at the age of four and left regular school five years later with the goal of becoming a world-class violinist; she practiced eight or nine hours a day and read a wide range of literature. Progressing to writing her own music, she studied under various teachers and went to Indiana University, which she left over issues regarding the relationship between classical music and the appearance of the performer. Through her own independent label Traitor Records, Autumn debuted in 1997 with her classical album On a Day: Music for Violin & Continuo, followed by the release in 2003 of her album Enchant.

Autumn appeared in singer Courtney Love's backing band on her 2004 America's Sweetheart tour and returned to Europe. She released the 2006 album Opheliac with the German label Trisol Music Group. In 2007, she released Laced/Unlaced; the re-release of On a Day... appeared as Laced with songs on the electric violin as Unlaced. She later left Trisol to join New York based The End Records in 2009 and release Opheliac in the United States, where previously it had only been available as an import. In 2012, she released the album Fight Like a Girl. She played the role of the Painted Doll in Darren Lynn Bousman's 2012 film The Devil's Carnival, as well as its 2015 sequel, Alleluia! The Devil's Carnival.

== Life and career ==
=== 1979–2000: Beginnings ===
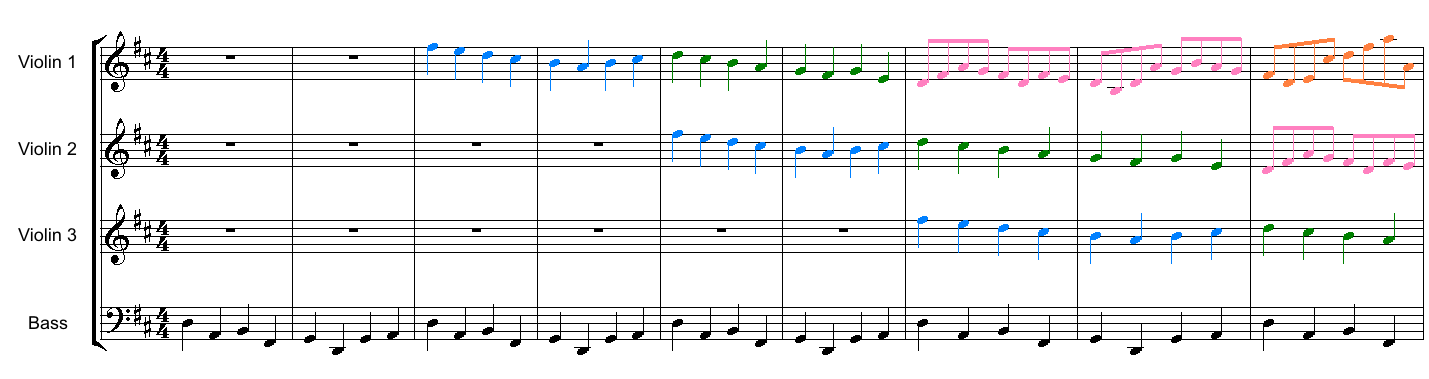
Autumn attributes her ability to write music in her mind to the fact that as a child, she played Pachelbel's Canon in D (pictured) mentally every night.

Emilie Autumn was born in Los Angeles, California, on September 22, 1979. Autumn grew up in Malibu, California. (Note: Autumn has also said that she grew up in Los Angeles.) She has stated that "being surrounded by nature and sea had a lot to do with [her] development as a 'free spirit.'" Her mother worked as a seamstress, and she has said that her father was a German immigrant with whom she did not share a close relationship. While not musicians, her family enjoyed various genres of music.

When Autumn was four years old, she started learning the violin, and later commented: "I remember asking for a violin, but I don't remember knowing what one was. I might have thought it was a kind of pony for all I know, but I don't remember being disappointed." Four years later, Autumn made her musical debut as a solo violinist performing with an orchestra, and won a competition. At the age of nine or ten, (Note: In a 2003 interview, she stated that she was ten years old when she made the decision to leave school to pursue learning the violin.) she left regular school with the goal of becoming a world-class violinist. On her time at the school, she remarked, "I hated it anyway, what with the status as 'weird,' 'antisocial,' and the physical threats, there seemed to be no reason to go anymore, so I just didn't." She practiced eight or nine hours a day, had lessons, read a wide range of literature, participated in orchestra practice, and was home-schooled. Growing up, she owned a large CD collection of "violin concertos, symphonies, chamber music, opera, and a little jazz". She began writing her own music and poetry at age thirteen or fourteen, though she never planned to sing any of her songs. She studied under various teachers and attended Indiana University in Bloomington, but left after two years there, because she disagreed with the prevailing views on individuality and classical music. She believed that neither the audience nor the original composer would be insulted by the clothing and appearance of the performer.

While convinced that she would only play violin, eighteen-year-old Autumn decided to sing on one of her songs as a way of demonstrating to a major music producer, who wanted to sign her on a label, how it should sound. She became unhappy with the changes done to her songs, and decided to break away from the label and create her own independent record label, Traitor Records. Through it, she debuted with her classical album On a Day: Music for Violin & Continuo, which she recorded in 1997 when she was seventeen years old; its title refers to the fact that the album took only a day to record. It consists of her performing works for the baroque violin accompanied by Roger Lebow on the baroque cello, Edward Murray on harpsichord, and Michael Egan on lute. She considered it "more of a demo despite its length", and released it as "a saleable album" after fans who enjoyed her "rock performances starting asking for a classical album so that they could hear more of the violin." She also debuted with her poetry book Across the Sky & Other Poems in 2000, later re-released in 2005 as Your Sugar Sits Untouched with a music-accompanied audiobook.

=== 2001–04: Enchant and collaborations ===
As part of a recording project, Autumn traveled to Chicago, Illinois, in 2001, and decided to stay because she enjoyed the public transportation system and music scene there. She released the 2001 EP Chambermaid while finishing Enchant—she alternatively labeled the musical style on Chambermaid as "fantasy rock" and cabaret—and wrote the 2001 charity single "By the Sword" after the events of September 11, 2001. According to her, the song is about strength, not violence; the act of swearing by the sword represents "an unbreakable promise to right a wrong, to stay true".

On February 26, 2003, (Note: While Autumn's official site lists the release date as 2002, newsletters published by Autumn and her interview with Musical Discovery point to the release date as February 26, 2003, with a free download of the complete album offered in January 2003.) Autumn released her concept album Enchant, which spanned multiple musical styles: "new-age, pop and trip hop chamber music". Written during her late teenage years, Enchant revolved around the supernatural realm and its effect on the modern-day world. Autumn labeled it as "fantasy rock", which dealt with "dreams and stories and ghosts and faeries who'll bite your head off if you dare to touch them". The faery-themed "Enchant Puzzle" appeared on the artwork of the album; her reward for the person who would solve it consisted of faery-related items. Her bandmates consisted of cellist Joey Harvey, drummer Heath Jansen, guitarist Ben Lehl, and bassist Jimmy Vanaria, who also worked on the electronics. At the same time of Enchant's release, Autumn had several side projects: Convent, a musical group for which she recorded all four voices; Ravensong, "a classical baroque ensemble" that she formed with friends in California; and The Jane Brooks Project, which she dedicated to the real-life, 16th-century Jane Brooks—a woman executed for witchcraft. (Note: As of 2012, no albums from any of her side-projects have been released. In 2003, Autumn had plans to release Ravensong's album live as "a radio broadcasted concert", so that the listeners would have "something to enjoy while we finish the studio recording". The album from The Jane Brooks Project, tentatively titled The Jane Brooks Songbook Volume I and later The Jane Brooks Project: Volume I, was slated for release "early next year", according to a 2003 interview; near the end of July 2004, Autumn commented that the album "is very near complete and we are mixing at present". The only song released by Convent, "Find Me a Man", appeared on Autumn's 2007 compilation album A Bit o' This & That.)

On the night of the Enchant release party, Autumn learned that Courtney Love had invited her to record an album, America's Sweetheart, and embark on the tour to promote it. Contributing violin and vocals, Autumn appeared in Love's backing band The Chelsea— along with Radio Sloan, Dvin Kirakosian, Samantha Maloney, and Lisa Leveridge—on the 2004 tour. Much of Autumn's violin work was ultimately not released on the album; she commented: "This had to do entirely with new producers taking over the project after our little vacation in France, and carefully discarding all of our sessions." She performed live with Love and The Chelsea on Late Show with David Letterman on March 17, 2004, and at Bowery Ballroom the next day. In September 2004, her father died from lung cancer, even though he had quit smoking twenty years earlier. Near the end of 2004, she was filmed for an appearance on an episode of HGTV's Crafters Coast to Coast, showing viewers how to create faery wings and sushi-styled soap—both products she sold in her online "web design and couture fashion house", WillowTech House. On December 23, 2004, she appeared on the Chicago-based television station WGN as part of the string quartet backing up Billy Corgan and Dennis DeYoung's duet of "We Three Kings".

=== 2005–09: Opheliac, Laced/Unlaced, and A Bit o' This & That ===
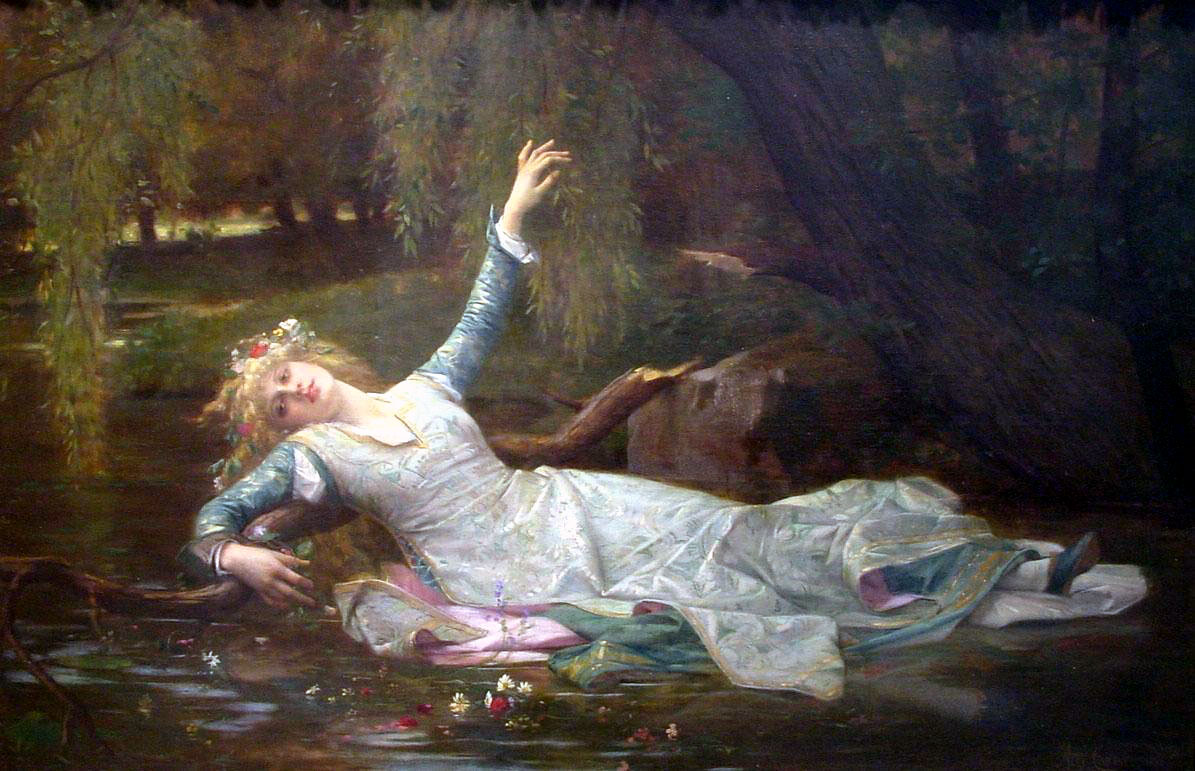
The title of Opheliac is a reference to Shakespeare's character Ophelia (above) from the play Hamlet, whom Autumn felt a connection to, and the archetype of the "self-destructive" woman.

Autumn began work on her concept album Opheliac in August 2004, and recorded it at Mad Villain Studios in Chicago. In August 2005, she created the costumes for Corgan's music video for the track "Walking Shade"; she also contributed violin and vocals for the track "DIA" from his 2005 album TheFutureEmbrace. In late 2005, Autumn also recorded vocals and violin for "The Gates of Eternity" from Attrition's 2008 album All Mine Enemys Whispers: The Story of Mary Ann Cotton, a concept album focusing on the Victorian serial killer Mary Ann Cotton. Autumn later protested the release of the song, claiming that it was unfinished, "altered without her permission", and had been intended only as a possible collaboration with Martin Bowes.

In January 2006, Autumn performed a song from the album, "Misery Loves Company", on WGN, before the album's release by the German label Trisol Music Group in September. She released the limited-edition, preview EP Opheliac through her own label, Traitor Records, in spring 2006; while the Opheliac EPs were being shipped, Autumn claimed that her offices had been robbed, causing the delay in the album release and the shipping of the EPs. According to her, Opheliac "was the documentation of a completely life-changing and life-ending experience". At one time, Autumn did have plans to film a music video for her song "Liar", which included "bloody bathtubs". Her song "Opheliac" later appeared on the 2007 albums 13th Street: The Sound of Mystery, Vol. 3, published by ZYX Music, and Fuck the Mainstream, Vol. 1, published by Alfa Matrix on June 19. On October 9, 2006, she appeared on the Adult Swim cartoon Metalocalypse as a guest artist and on the subsequent 2007 album The Dethalbum. November 2006 saw the release of the EP Liar/Dead Is the New Alive, which featured remixes of songs from Opheliac and new material.

Autumn released her instrumental album, Laced/Unlaced in March 2007; it consisted of two discs: Laced, the re-release of On a Day..., and Unlaced, new songs for the electric violin. She decided to re-release On a Day as Laced because she "felt that it made a nice contrast to the metal shredding fiddle album, "Unlaced", and [...] loved that it was the perfect representation of "then" versus "now". She also performed live at the German musical events Wave Gotik Treffen and M'era Luna Festival in 2007. She later released A Bit o' This & That: a rarities album of her covers, including songs from The Beatles and The Smiths, classical pieces, and her own songs. In 2008, she released the EP 4 o'Clock, which contained remixes of songs from Opheliac, new songs, and a reading from her autobiographical novel The Asylum for Wayward Victorian Girls. She also released another EP, Girls Just Wanna Have Fun &Bohemian Rhapsody, the same year. A year later, Autumn broke away from Trisol Music Group to join The End Records and re-release Opheliac in the United States on October 27, 2009; previously, it was only available there as an import. The re-release included extras such as pictures, bonus tracks, an excerpt from The Asylum for Wayward Victorian Girls, and a video.

In addition to releasing her own material, Autumn collaborated with other musicians. She contributed backing vocals and violin to the track "Dry" by Die Warzau and made an appearance in the band's music video for "Born Again". She played violin on the song "UR A WMN NOW" from OTEP's 2009 album, Smash the Control Machine. Additionally, two of her tracks appeared in film soundtracks: "Organ Grinder" from 4 o'Clock on the European edition of Saw III and a remixed version of "Dead Is The New Alive" from Opheliac on the international version of Saw IV.

=== 2010–present: The Asylum for Wayward Victorian Girls and Fight Like a Girl ===
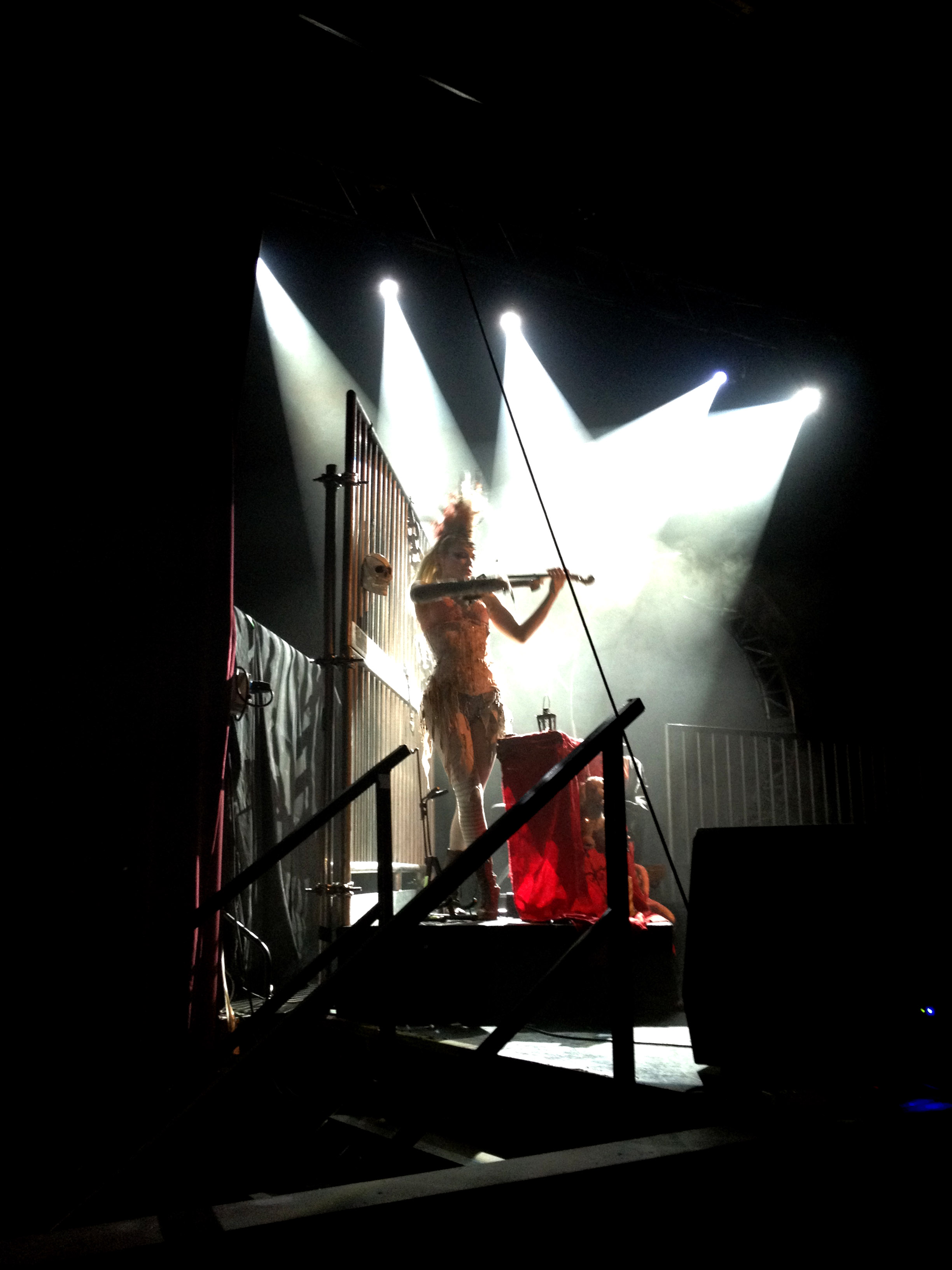
Autumn performs "Liar" in Manchester, England, April 2012

Autumn's debut novel, The Asylum for Wayward Victorian Girls, was self-published in late 2009, with a second edition following in 2010. Because of the book's nature and possible autobiographical sections, she claimed its release was delayed because some did not want it published. The book combines Autumn's own real life journal entries, including those chronicling her time in a psych ward, and the diary of a fictional Victorian-era asylum inmate named "Emily". Autumn has said that the intent of the book was to show "there's very little difference from asylums for ladies in 1841 and the ones for us now," and that the subject of mental illness remains misunderstood.

In June 2010, Autumn released the acronym of her upcoming album, F.L.A.G., on her Twitter account, before revealing the full title as Fight Like a Girl. In her words, the meaning behind the title is "about taking all these things that make women the underdogs and using them to your advantage". Based on her novel, The Asylum for Wayward Victorian Girls, the album has been described as "an operatic feminist treatise set inside an insane asylum, wherein the female inmates gradually realize their own strength in numbers". On August 30, 2010, she announced that she would be undergoing jaw surgery, and had to postpone her North American tour dates while she recovered. In September 2011, she posted the full lyrics to the album's title track, "Fight Like a Girl", on her Twitter account. Autumn appeared at the 2011 Harvest Festival in Australia, and had planned to debut two songs from Fight Like a Girl during those performances. On April 11, 2012, Autumn released the single "Fight Like a Girl", with the song "Time for Tea" appearing as a B-side.

On April 16, 2012, Autumn announced her plans to debut a three-hour musical adaptation of her autobiographical novel on London's West End theatre in 2014. According to her interview with Mulatschag, she has plans to play the roles of both protagonists, Emilie and Emily.

In late 2011, a twelve-minute teaser was released for Darren Lynn Bousman and Terrance Zdunich's project The Devil's Carnival, featuring Autumn as The Painted Doll, her first major acting role. The film was released in April 2012. Bloody Crumpets members Beth "The Blessed Contessa" Hinderliter and Maggie "Captain Maggot" Lally also appear in the film as “Woe-Maidens”.

On June 13, 2012, Autumn announced on her blog the release date of Fight Like a Girl, which was on July 24 of the same year.

In 2013, Autumn produced and starred in her first ever music video, directed by Darren Lynn Bousman, for the song "Fight Like a Girl". Also appearing in the video are Autumn's Devil's Carnival co-stars Dayton Callie and Marc Senter, as well as Veronica Varlow, among others.

In 2014, it was announced that Autumn would be appearing at a handful of dates on the 2014 Vans Warped Tour with an installation called "The Asylum Experience", which will include music, burlesque, circus sideshow attractions and theater.

On September 22, 2018, she released The Asylum for Wayward Victorian Girls: Behind the Musical, an album with songs made for her upcoming musical. In 2018, she also published a short story titled The Gown.

On November 3, 2021, Autumn released the single "The Passenger", a cover of the song by Iggy Pop, marking her first official release in three years.

In January 2022, she released “We Have Instructions”, “Who's a Little Leech?”, and “Portraits”.

== Influences and musical style ==
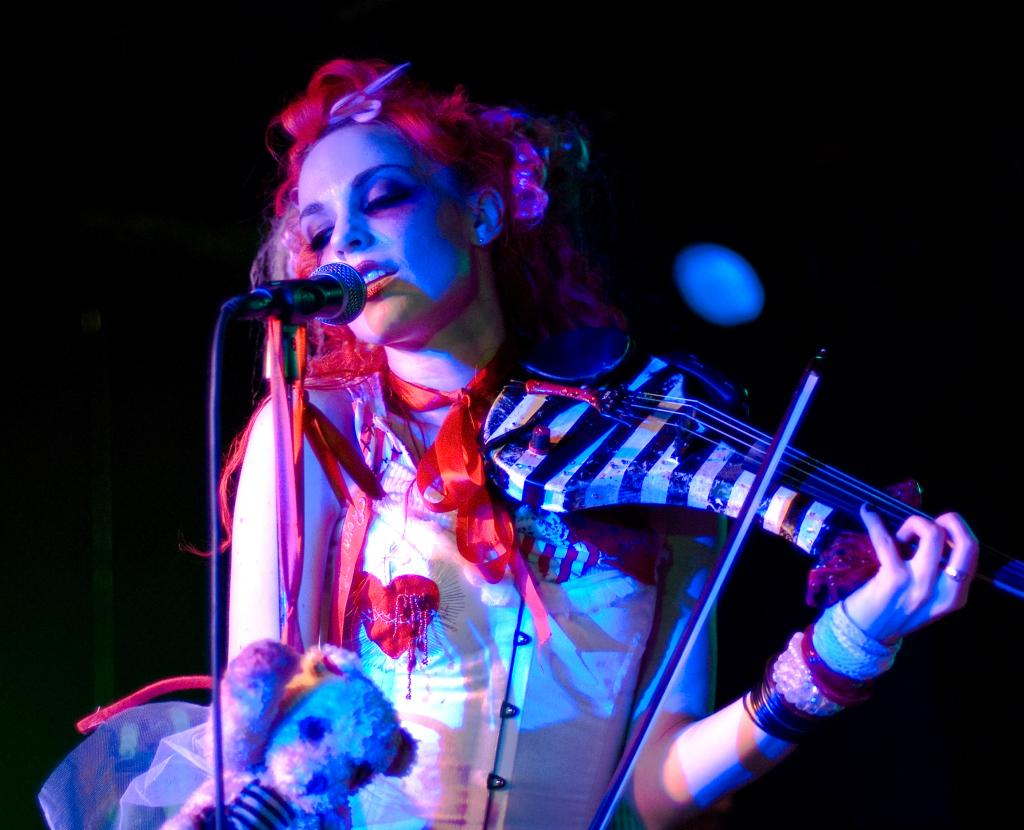
Autumn in Frankfurt, 2007

Her music encompasses a wide range of styles. Autumn's vocal range is contralto, but also has the ability to perform in the dramatic soprano range. Her vocal work has been compared to Tori Amos, Kate Bush, and The Creatures. She has released two instrumental albums (On a Day... and Laced/Unlaced), and four featuring her vocals: Enchant, Opheliac, A Bit o' This & That, and "Fight Like a Girl". The 2003 album Enchant drew on "new age chamber music, trip hop baroque, and experimental space pop". Autumn layers her voice frequently, and incorporates electronics and electronic effects into her work on Enchant; she also combines strings and piano for some songs, while others feature mainly the piano or violin. The 2006 release Opheliac featured "cabaret, electronic, symphonic, new age, and good ol' rock & roll (and heavy on the theatrical bombast)".

A classically trained musician, Autumn is influenced by plays, novels, and history, particularly the Victorian era. She enjoys the works of Shakespeare, Elizabeth Barrett Browning and husband Robert, and Edgar Allan Poe. She incorporates sounds resembling Victorian machinery such as locomotives, which she noted was "sort of a steampunk thing". While a young Autumn cited Itzhak Perlman as an influence because of the happiness she believed he felt when he played, her main musical influence and inspiration is the English violinist Nigel Kennedy. Her favorite singer is Morrissey from The Smiths. She takes inspiration for her songs from her life experiences and mixes in "layers and layers of references, connections, other stories and metaphors". Autumn has variously described her music and style as "Psychotic Vaudeville Burlesque", "Victoriandustrial'", a term she coined, and glam rock because of her use of glitter onstage. According to Autumn, her music "wasn't meant to be cutesy" and is labeled as "industrial" mainly because of her use of drums and yelling. Her adaption of "O Mistress Mine" was praised by author and theater director Barry Edelstein as "a ravishing, guaranteed tearjerker".

For her live performances, which she calls dinner theatre because of her practice of throwing tea and tea-time snacks off of the stage, Autumn makes use of burlesque—"a show that was mainly using humour and sexuality to make a mockery of things that were going on socially and politically"—to counterbalance the more morbid topics discussed in her music, such as abuse, suicide and self-mutilation. Her shows feature handmade costumes, fire tricks, theatrics, and her all-female backing band, The Bloody Crumpets, a group whose members have variously included burlesque performer Veronica Varlow as The Naughty Veronica, performance artist Maggie Lally as Captain Maggot, Jill Evyn as Lady Amalthea (or Moth), actress and performer Beth Hinderliter as The Blessed Contessa, actress Aprella Godfrey Barule as Lady Aprella, German musician Lucina as Little Lucina, cellist Sarah Kim as Lady Joo Hee, German costume designer Vecona as Captain Vecona, Jesselynn Desmond as Little Miss Sugarless, and Ulorin Vex. Her intention is for the live shows to be a statement of "anti-repression" and empowerment.

== Personal life ==
She keeps a ritual of drawing a heart on her cheek as a symbol of protection.

Autumn became vegetarian at age eleven after being unable to rationalize why she should eat farm animals but not her pet dog; in her late-teens, she became vegan. She has stated she believes that there is a link between the treatment of women and animals in society. In August 2014, Autumn said she had developed copper toxicity and was no longer vegan, although still a committed vegetarian.

In 2021, Autumn adopted a Toy Manchester Terrier, who she named Darjeeling.

She has endorsed companies such as Manic Panic and Samson Tech.

Autumn has bipolar disorder, which she has discussed in a number of interviews.

== Discography ==
Studio albums

- Enchant (2003)
- Opheliac (2006)
- Fight Like a Girl (2012)
- The Asylum for Wayward Victorian Girls: Behind the Musical (2018)

Instrumental albums

- On a Day... (1997)
- Laced/Unlaced (2007)

== Concert tours ==
- The Asylum Tour (2007)
- The Plague Tour (2008)
- The Gate Tour (2008–2009)
- The Key Tour (2009)
- The Door Tour (2011)
- The Fight Like a Girl Tour (2011–2012)

== Bibliography ==
- Across the Sky & Other Poems (2000)
- Your Sugar Sits Untouched (2005)
- The Asylum for Wayward Victorian Girls (2009)
- The Gown: A Short Story (2017)

== Filmography ==
- 11-11-11 as 11'er in Video (2011) Uncredited
- The Devil's Carnival (2012) as Painted Doll
- Alleluia! The Devil's Carnival (2015) as June / The Painted Doll
