= Aaron Hawks =

American multidisciplinary artist (born 1973)

- Born: May 12, 1973 (age 53); Seattle, Washington
- Known for: Erotic photography; installation art; art films
- Website: www.aaronhawks.net

Aaron Hawks (born May 12, 1973) is an American multidisciplinary artist, best known for his conceptual fetish photography and installation art.

== Career ==
Born and raised in Seattle, Hawks lived and worked in San Francisco, Los Angeles, and Berlin before relocating to Brooklyn, New York in 2012. Throughout the years his work featured a diverse array of subjects in the "alternative" art scene, including artists Michael Hussar, and Molly Crabapple; alternative models Ulorin Vex, and Darenzia; and pornographic film actors Skin Diamond, Asphyxia Noir, and Emily Addison.

Hawks’ photography has been featured in magazines such as Juxtapoz, and American Photo, and his work published in photography compilations by Taschen, Goliath Books, and Little, Brown and Company. His short art film 'Salt' (2002) was shown at Roxie Theater in San Francisco.

== See also ==
- Erotic photography
- Fetish art
- Nude (art)
- Depictions of nudity
- Nude photography
- Installation art
- Art films
