= Alleluia! The Devil's Carnival =

- Theatrical poster
- Directed by: Darren Lynn Bousman
- Written by: Terrance Zdunich
- Produced by: Chris M. Bonifay; Sean E. DeMott; Chang Tseng
- Starring: Paul Sorvino; Terrance Zdunich; Emilie Autumn; Marc Senter; Dayton Callie; David Hasselhoff; Tech N9ne; Briana Evigan; Bill Moseley; Nivek Ogre
- Cinematography: Joseph White
- Edited by: Brian J. Smith
- Music by: Saar Hendelman; Terrance Zdunich
- Production companies: Execution Style Entertainment; Limb from Limb Pictures
- Distributed by: Cleopatra Films
- Release date: August 11, 2015
- Running time: 98 minutes
- Country: United States
- Language: English
- Budget: $500,000

Alleluia! The Devil's Carnival (stylized onscreen as The Devil's Carnival: Alleluia!) is a 2015 American musical fantasy horror film directed by Darren Lynn Bousman and written by Terrance Zdunich. It is a direct sequel to Bousman's 2012 film The Devil's Carnival. Production commenced in August 2014 and the film was released on August 11, 2015, by Cleopatra Films.

== Plot ==
Lucifer conducts a train full of condemned souls, including Ms. Merrywood, back up to Heaven ("Shovel and Bone"). In Heaven, God discusses the crisis with his top dog, The Agent. The Agent and The Translators, officers in Heaven's police force, interrogate Merrywood. In Hell, the Ticket-Keeper warns Lucifer that the carnies are not prepared for a war with Heaven, but Lucifer dismisses him to entertain a cloaked figure. Lucifer opens his book of Aesop's Fables and begins reading "The Filly and The Lapdog."

In flashback, a new crop of Applicants arrive in Heaven, including best friends June and Cora. They are welcomed into Heaven and are offered a tour of the premises ("All Aboard (Everybody's Doing The Ark)"). June steals a Number 1 armband from The Designer, who keeps the Number 7s working in a windowless design shop ("Only By Design"). June convinces Cora to explore Heaven with her, only for the two to be arrested and interrogated by The Translators ("Good Little Dictation Machines"). The Agent intervenes; immediately, there is mutual attraction between him and June, which gets him negative press from The Watchword. God orders The Agent to seduce June to expose her heresy.

The Agent brings June to a bar where he sings "Down at the Midnight Rectory". God arrives and serenades one of his girlfriends ("Cloud Serenade"). The Agent and June's relationship continues under the watchful eye of The Watchword ("The Watchword’s Hour"), who later warns Cora that her lesbian attraction to June is illegal in Heaven. Later, June steals the forbidden Book of the Knowledge of Life and Death, confident that The Agent's clout will protect her, but sets off an alarm in doing so. She is beaten by The Translators and tossed down an elevator shaft leading to Hell while The Agent watches and doesn't intervene. Meanwhile, The Librarian instructs Cora and the other Applicants to denounce June and spend the rest of the night re-shelving Heaven's library ("Hitting on All Sevens").

June arrives at the Carnival (which is notably smaller and weaker than it is in the previous film). She flees from The Fool and finds The Twin, who challenges her to a game, shapeshifting into Cora, The Agent, and June herself as the game progresses ("Fair Game"). Upon losing, June wanders into the midway and finds Lucifer. She inspires him to turn the Carnival into something that can challenge Heaven, and he helps her transform into The Painted Doll ("After the Fall").

In the present, Ticket-Keeper rebuffs several plans to attack Heaven from the carnies. The cloaked figure is revealed to be Painted Doll, who will play a role in Lucifer's war with Heaven. Ticket-Keeper confronts Lucifer, offering to sacrifice himself for the cause, but Lucifer refuses. Meanwhile, in Heaven, God dispatches The Agent to face Lucifer and quell the uprising in Hell, giving him a book containing the story "The Filly and the Lapdog".

God puts on a show for the denizens of Heaven ("Bells of the Black Sunday"). Meanwhile, The Agent arrives in Hell and finds Painted Doll, and is horrified by her disfigured appearance. She briefly seduces him before openly taunting him in front of the other carnies ("Hoof and Lap/The Devil’s Carnival"). Lucifer prepares for battle by applying war makeup. God stands in front of a microphone in an empty room, as his servants arm themselves for war. In Heaven, a bruised, beaten Merrywood transforms, revealing that it has been The Twin all along. The Twin then poses as the Agent returning from his mission. In a post-credits sequence, The Twin as The Agent serenades God ("Songs of Old"), leaving the future uncertain.

== Cast ==
- Paul Sorvino as God
- Terrance Zdunich as Lucifer
- Emilie Autumn as June / The Painted Doll
- Marc Senter as The Scorpion
- Adam Pascal as The Agent
- Dayton Callie as The Ticket Keeper
- David Hasselhoff as The Designer
- Tech N9ne as The Librarian
- Briana Evigan as Ms. Kathleen Merrywood
- Bill Moseley as The Magician
- Nivek Ogre as The Twin
- Barry Bostwick as The Watchword
- Ted Neeley as The Publicist
- Lyndon Smith as Cora
- J. LaRose as The Major
- Heidi Shepherd as Twist / The Rosy Bayonettes
- Brea Grant as Click / The Rosy Bayonettes
- Carla Harvey as Lock / The Rosy Bayonettes
- Kristina Klebe as Geraldine / His Lady of Virtue
- Alisa Burket as Virginia / His Lady of Virtue
- Francesca Vannucci as Pearl / His Lady of Virtue
- Jimmy Urine as Translator Bentz
- Chantal Claret as Translator Batez
- Danny Worsnop as The Smith
- Barry Dennen as Heaven's Denizen. Dennen went uncredited for his role and it marked his final film appearance before his death in September 2017.

== Soundtrack ==
1. "Shovel and Bone" - Lucifer, The Twin (as Ms. Merrywood), and Lost Souls
2. "All Aboard (Everybody's Doing the Ark)" - The Publicist and His Ladies of Virtue
3. "Only by Design" - The Designer and Fillies
4. "Good Little Dictation Machines" - Translator Bentz and Translator Batez
5. "Down at the Midnight Rectory" † - The Agent, The Publicist, and His Ladies of Virtue
6. "Cloud Serenade" † - God
7. "The Watchword's Hour" - The Watchword
8. "Hitting on All Sevens" - The Librarian, Cora and Applicants
9. "Fair Game" - The Twin (As himself, Cora, The Agent, and June)
10. "After the Fall" - Lucifer
11. "Bells of the Black Sunday" - God, Cora, and His Ladies of Virtue (except Geraldine)
12. "Hoof and Lap / The Devil's Carnival" - The Painted Doll, The Agent, and The Rosy Bayonettes
13. "Songs of Old" ‡ - The Twin (As The Agent)
14. "Alleluia" § - Heaven

† Order is swapped on film and soundtrack (film order is listed here) ‡ Performed during a mid-credits scene § Snippets are heard throughout the film, but it's only played in full over the end credits

== Production ==
Most of the original cast from the first film are returning, with Zdunich and Sorvino reprising their roles of Lucifer and God. New cast members include Barry Bostwick, Ted Neeley, Adam Pascal, Tech N9ne, Jimmy Urine, Chantal Claret, and David Hasselhoff.

Whereas The Devil's Carnival took place in Hell, Alleluia focuses on Heaven. In describing it, writer Zdunich stated that "Heaven in particular is a very different aesthetic than hell...think Golden Age of Hollywood. You have fancy suits and everything is tailored, an air that everything is perfect and glamorous, but meanwhile in the backdrop of that era you also have the Great Depression." Zdunich went on to say that the style would be "Clark Gable on acid."

Bousman described the film as "[pulling] back the curtain on Heaven... and in 'The Devil's Carnival,' God and his angels are a whole lot darker than Lucifer and his carnies."

=== Filming ===
A fifteen-day shoot was planned, but due to financial constraints this was reduced to fourteen days, concluding on September 2, 2014.

== Release ==
The official teaser trailer for Alleluia! came out on November 6, 2014, with the film due for a Summer 2015 release.

As with its predecessor, Alleluia! was screened via a 'Road Tour' across the US. The film premiered in Los Angeles on August 11, 2015, and the road tour kicked off two weeks later on August 26, 2015, in Tucson, Arizona. The tour ran until October 18, ending with an encore screening in Los Angeles. The tour was troubled, suffering legal and financial issues as well as what Zdunich described as "illogical tour routing, poor ground management and worse communication". The issues led to two shows being cancelled, and the end of the franchise.

The film's soundtrack was made available for purchase digitally from iTunes and physically from Cleopatra Records on August 7, 2015. According to the director at a road tour Q&A, the film is scheduled for a Blu-ray release on Christmas Day, with preorders available on Black Friday. The film was ultimately released in March 2016 as a Blu-ray and DVD combo pack, which was limited to 6,660 copies, similar to the home media release for The Devil's Carnival. The Blu-ray set also included a lyric booklet, a certificate of authenticity, and came packaged in a nylon drawstring bag.

== Reception ==
Reception for Alleluia! The Devil's Carnival has been positive. It holds a 100% positive rating on Rotten Tomatoes, based on six critic reviews.
