= Veronica Varlow =

American burlesque dancer

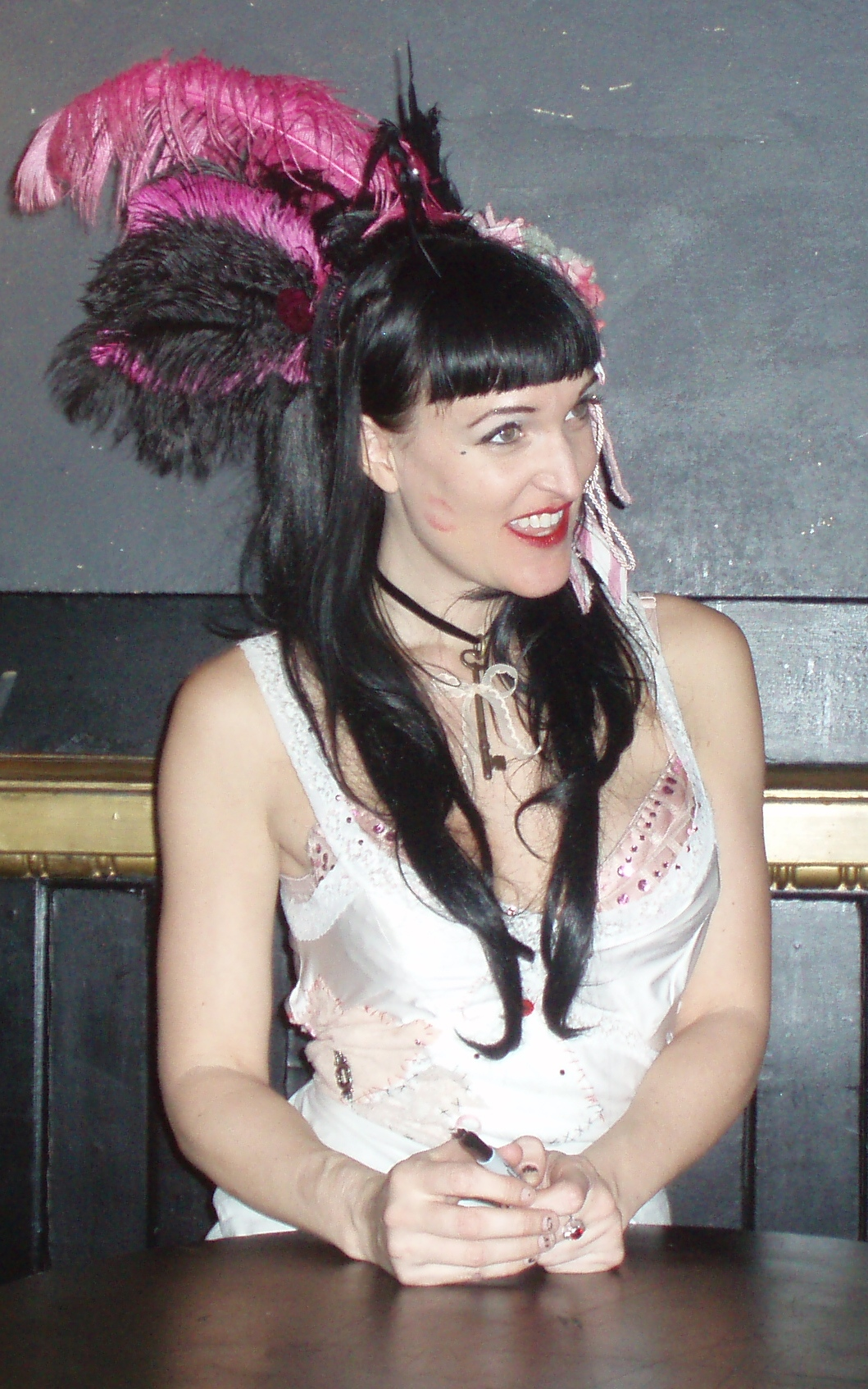
- Veronica Varlow
- Born: Tara Lee; 1979 (age 46–47); Florida, U.S.
- Known for: Burlesque, acting, modeling
- Website: lovewitch.com

Veronica Varlow is an American burlesque dancer, pin-up model, author, actress, producer, and performance artist based in Brooklyn, New York.

== Biography ==
Varlow began her performance career after being attacked by a dog in December 2003.

Varlow has performed internationally as one of Emilie Autumn's Bloody Crumpets as "The Naughty Veronica" since 2007. Varlow has performed for events held by designer Marc Jacobs, supermodel Heidi Klum, The Whitney Museum, and best-selling novelist Melissa de la Cruz. In 2013, she was named one of the 12 "Hottest Ladies of Burlesque" alongside performers such as Bettie Page, Lili St. Cyr, and Sherry Britton.

Veronica Varlow is a witch descended from five generations of Czech-Romani witches. She calls upon the ancient and hidden Czech-Romani magic passed down from her grandmother Helen’s lineage and infuses it with her own signature sorcery to help people awaken and amplify their truest self.

On November 2, 2021, Varlow released her first book, Bohemian Magick: Witchcraft and Secret Spells to Electrify Your Life, through HarperCollins.

=== Film and TV appearances ===
In the fall of 2008, Varlow participated as a coach for Andrea Martin in MTV's Emmy-winning show, MADE. She appeared in the 2009 film Exposed and in the 2010 short documentary Dr Sketchy's Anti-Art School by Peter Bolte.

She featured in Emilie Autumn's music video for the song "Fight Like A Girl" in 2013.

== Personal life ==
On October 31, 2020, Varlow married David Garfinkel, with whom she runs a coven at the Chelsea Hotel in NYC. She was previously married to photographer Burke Heffner on June 24, 2006.

She currently resides in Brooklyn and also owns a house in Woodstock, NY, called Curiosa (affectionately referred to as "Magic House") where she runs yearly Witch Camp retreats.
