= Chambermaid (EP) =

EP by Emilie Autumn
- Released: 2001
- Genre: Electronic
- Length: 50:14
- Label: Seraph Records

Emilie Autumn chronology
On a Day... (1997)	Chambermaid (2001)	By the Sword (2001)

Chambermaid is an EP by Emilie Autumn, released in 2001 by Seraph Records. Originally intended as a single from her album Enchant, Autumn has said she considers it to be an EP because she "packed so much material onto it". Most tracks were also subsequently released on different albums; "What If (Blackbird Mix)" appears as "What If (Celtic Mix)" on A Bit o' This & That. "Chambermaid (Decomposition Mix)" is the only track not found anywhere else.

== Lyrics ==
In an interview, Autumn described the song "Chambermaid" as a "fantastic drama" she made up, saying, "the song is not necessarily about me as I have never been the neglected and venomous woman that personifies the main character, but I have an overactive imagination and can easily conjure any number of spirits for inspiration."

== Track listing ==
All tracks are written by Emilie Autumn, except where noted.

No.	Title	Writer(s)	Length
1.	"Chambermaid"		3:16
2.	"Chambermaid" (Space Mountain Mix)		6:48
3.	"Chambermaid" (Decomposition Mix)		3:02
4.	"Largo for Violin &Harpsichord"	J.S. Bach	4:08
5.	"What If"		4:12
6.	"What If" (Blackbird Remix)		4:26
7.	"Hollow Like My Soul"	Mykel Boyd, Arr. Emilie Autumn	4:50
8.	"I Don't Care Much" from Cabaret; Hidden Track: "Revelry"	Kander/Ebb	19:28
9.	"[silence]"		0:04
Total length:			50:14
