= Marc Senter =

American actor

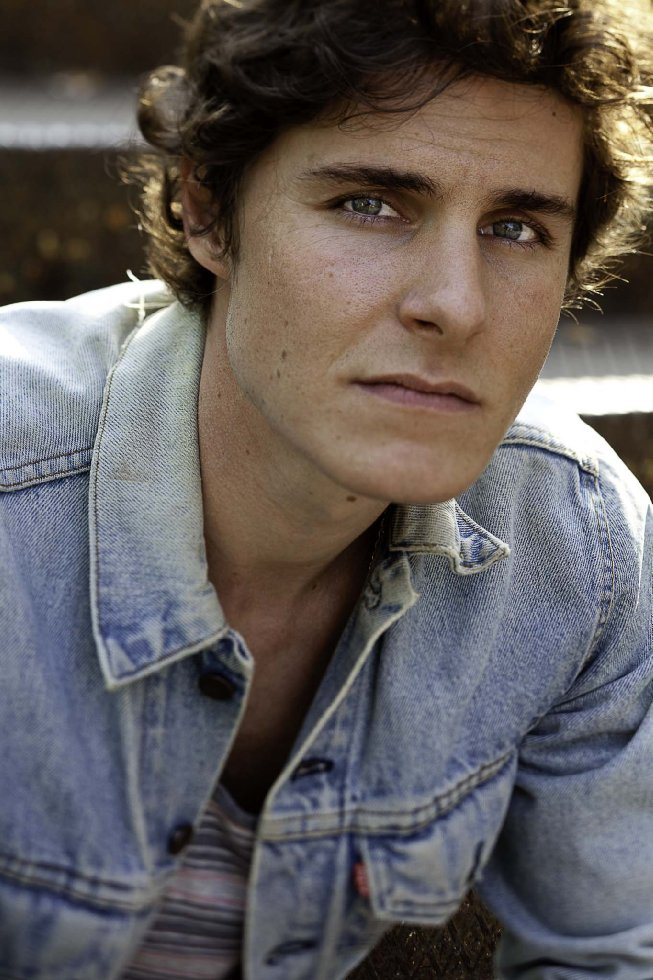
Marc Senter photographed by Dario D'India in Milan, Italy.

Marc Senter is an American actor. He is most known for his work in Red White & Blue, The Devil's Carnival, and his award-winning performance in The Lost. His other film credits include Brawler, Cabin Fever 2: Spring Fever, and Starry Eyes. Senter has also appeared in a handful of television programs such as JAG, NCIS, The District, Like Family, and had a small recurring role on The Young and the Restless. He was also featured in Emilie Autumn's Fight Like a Girl music video.
