= Liar/Dead Is the New Alive =

EP by Emilie Autumn
- Released: January 22, 2007
- Genre: Electronica, electro-industrial
- Length: 63:30
- Label: Trisol Music Group

Emilie Autumn chronology
Opheliac (2006)	Liar/Dead Is the New Alive (2007)	Laced/Unlaced (2007)

Liar/Dead Is the New Alive is a 2007 EP by Emilie Autumn, released through Trisol Music Group; the title derives from two tracks taken from her album Opheliac. The release also includes a preview version of the song "Unlaced", which was later released on the Laced/Unlaced album.

== Track listing ==
All tracks are written by Emilie Autumn.

No.	Title	Length
1.	"Liar" (Album Version)	6:01
2.	"Dead Is the New Alive" (Album Version)	5:03
3.	"Mad Girl"	4:14
4.	"Best Safety Lies in Fear"	2:55
5.	"In the Lake" (Live)	4:01
6.	"Let It Die" (Live)	3:17
7.	"Liar" (Murder Mix by Brendon Small)	5:49
8.	"Liar" (Manic Depressive Mix by ASP)	4:57
9.	"Liar" (Machine Mix by Dope Stars Inc.)	3:57
10.	"Liar" (Medical Mix by Angelspit)	5:28
11.	"Dead Is the New Alive" (Velvet Acid Christ Club Mix)	5:08
12.	"Dead Is the New Alive" (Manipulator Mix by Dope Stars Inc.)	5:11
13.	"Thank God I'm Pretty" (Cover by Spiritual Front)	3:57
14.	"Unlaced" (Preview Track)	3:32
Total length:		63:30
