= Girls Just Wanna Have Fun & Bohemian Rhapsody =

EP by Emilie Autumn
- Released: September 22, 2008
- Recorded: Mad Villain Studios, Chicago
- Genre: Dark cabaret, electronica
- Length: 36:55
- Label: Trisol Music Group
- Producer: Emilie Autumn

Emilie Autumn chronology
4 o'Clock (2007)	Girls Just Wanna Have Fun & Bohemian Rhapsody (2008)	Fight Like a Girl (2012)

Girls Just Wanna Have Fun & Bohemian Rhapsody is an EP by Emilie Autumn released on September 22, 2008 by Trisol Music Group. The first version was available for pre-order as a limited edition digipak bundle, which came with a limited edition "Goths Have More Fun" T-shirt. A standard jewel case was released at the same time.

== Background and promotion ==
Of her decision to cover both "Girls Just Wanna Have Fun" and "Bohemian Rhapsody", Autumn spoke about her desire to do something unusual, describing them as "two of the most non-Gothic songs in the world," as well as wanting to pay homage to her glam rock inspirations. In an interview with the British publication Alternative Magazine, Autumn said of "Bohemian Rhapsody" that it felt an "extremely natural" choice of song for her to cover, citing similar elements to her own music, such as large amounts of vocal layering and the guitar solo, which she said "lends itself perfectly to electric fiddle." She had variously performed both songs at live shows before the release of the EP, and continued to do so afterwards.

In 2009, Autumn performed "Bohemian Rhapsody" on WGN-TV Live.

== Reception ==
Reception to the EP was mixed, with much of the criticism directed at her cover of "Bohemian Rhapsody." Alex Young of Consequence said of the cover "shrill violin harmonizes well with Autumn’s semi-operatic vocal range, and while not as grandiose as the original we thank her for the contribution," but also referred to the track as "very unique and somewhat haunting." A review from The Critical Cynic praised her rendition of "Girls Just Wanna Have Fun" as "a triumph" and "probably one of her best recordings", but was more critical of her version of "Bohemian Rhapsody", stating "the original is a full blown production that screams fullness and atmosphere. This version pales in comparison," and "the song feels simply empty."

== Track listing ==
No.	Title	Writer(s)	Length
1.	"Girls Just Wanna Have Fun"	Robert Hazard	4:18
2.	"Bohemian Rhapsody"	Freddie Mercury	5:33
3.	"Girls Just Wanna Have Fun" (Harpsichord Rendezvous)	Hazard	4:09
4.	"Asleep" (Live)	Morrissey, Johnny Marr	1:55
5.	"Mad Girl" (Live)	Emilie Autumn	4:15
6.	"Girls Just Wanna Have Fun" (Teatime Remix by EA)	Hazard	4:46
7.	"Girls Just Wanna Have Fun" (Asylum Remix by Inkydust)	Hazard	5:01
8.	"Girls Just Wanna Have Fun" (Bad Girl Remix by The Fire)	Hazard	4:16
9.	"Gentlemen Aren't Nice"	Autumn	2:42
Total length:			36:55
