= 4 O'Clock =

4 o'Clock

EP by Emilie Autumn
- Released: January 18, 2008
- Recorded: Mad Villain Studios, Chicago
- Genre: Dark cabaret, electronica, industrial
- Length: 36:41
- Label: Trisol Music Group
- Producer: Emilie Autumn

Emilie Autumn chronology
A Bit o' This & That (2007)	4 o'Clock (2008)	Girls Just Wanna Have Fun & Bohemian Rhapsody (2008)

4 o'Clock is an EP by Emilie Autumn, released on January 18, 2008, by Trisol Music Group. The first version was a limited edition digipak. A standard jewel case was released on February 29, 2008.

The track "Organ Grinder" was originally featured on the European version of the Saw III soundtrack.

== The Asylum for Wayward Victorian Girls ==
Tracks 7, 8, and the beginning of track 9 feature spoken-word excerpts from Autumn's novel The Asylum for Wayward Victorian Girls, which was published the next year in 2009. The style of these tracks, which includes sound effects that accompany an orated exert, would not be heard again until the release of Emilie Autumn's audiobook version of the novel in 2016.

== Track listing ==
All tracks are written by Emilie Autumn, except where noted.

No.	Title	Writer(s)	Length
1.	"4 o'Clock"		5:16
2.	"My Fairweather Friend"		3:30
3.	"Gothic Lolita (Bad Poetry Mix by Sieben/Matt Howden)"		4:30
4.	"Swallow (Filthy Victorian Mix by Perfidious Words)"		5:05
5.	"Swallow (Oyster Mix by Punto Omega)"		3:38
6.	"Organ Grinder"		3:21
7.	"Excerpts from the upcoming book The Asylum"		4:00
8.	"Words from The Asylum"		3:13
9.	"Is It My Body"	Cooper, Buxton, Bruce, Dunaway, Smith	4:08
Total length:			36:41
