= On a Day... =

Studio album by Emilie Autumn
- Released: 1997
- Genre: Baroque
- Length: 35:07
- Label: Traitor Records
- Producer: Emilie Autumn

Emilie Autumn chronology
On a Day... (1997)	Chambermaid (2001)

On a Day: Music for Violin & Continuo (commonly referred to as: On a Day...) is the debut instrumental album by Emilie Autumn, released in 1997. The album was recorded the same year, when Autumn was seventeen years old. Its title refers to both the Shakespeare song and the fact that the album took only a day to record. It consists of her performing works for the baroque violin accompanied by friends on the cello, harpsichord, and lute.

== Release and promotion ==
On a Day... was originally released by Emilie Autumn on her own record label, Traitor Records. Autumn did not initially intend to release the album, considering it "more of a demo despite its length", and released it after fans who enjoyed her "rock performances starting asking for a classical album so that they could hear more of the violin".

The album was re-released digitally by Trisol Music Group in 2005.

The album was again re-released as "Laced" on Emilie's second instrumental album Laced / Unlaced in 2007.

== Track listing ==
No.	Title	Writer(s)	Length
1.	"La Folia"	Arcangelo Corelli	10:18
2.	"Recercada"	Diego Ortiz	1:43
3.	"Largo"	Johann Sebastian Bach	4:02
4.	"Allegro"	Johann Sebastian Bach	3:21
5.	"Adagio"	Jean-Marie Leclair	3:36
6.	"Tambourin"	Jean-Marie Leclair	1:52
7.	"Willow"	Emilie Autumn	5:49
8.	"Revelry"	Emilie Autumn	1:56
9.	"On a Day..."	Emilie Autumn	2:30
Total length:			35:07

== Personnel ==
- Emilie Autumn – baroque violin
- Roger Lebow – baroque cello
- Michael Egan – lute
- Edward Murray – harpsichord
