= Harvest (music festival) =

Australian annual music festival

- Genre: Alternative rock, Indie rock, Indie folk and Shoe-gaze
- Dates: November
- Locations: Australia; Brisbane; Sydney; Melbourne
- Years active: 2011–2012
- Founders: AJ Maddah

Harvest (also advertised as 'Harvest – A Civilised Gathering' or 'Harvest Presents "The Gathering"') was an annual music festival held in major cities around Australia. The festival was created in 2011 by Soundwave Touring, the same team behind the heavier Soundwave Festival, as a festival to showcase the bands of lighter genres that didn't fit into the Soundwave lineup. The festival also promoted art installations, performers and all events were held in garden styled locations. The lineup featured international and Australian music acts, from various genres including alternative rock, indie rock, indie folk and shoe-gaze. The festival has been headlined by Portishead, Beck, Sigur Rós and The Flaming Lips.

The 2013 festival was planned with artists announced and tickets going on sale. On 16 September 2013, the Harvest founder, music promoter AJ Maddah, announced that the 2013 Harvest festival was cancelled due to poor ticket sales.

== 2011 ==
The first year of the festival was held in Brisbane, Sydney and Melbourne. This was Portishead's first tour of Australia in 14 years. The first lineup announcement was made on 22 July 2011, with some extra bands announced on 7 September 2011. Tickets went on public sale on 4 August 2011 for $150, with a cheaper pre-sale option. The Melbourne date of the festival was sold out.

=== Locations ===
- Werribee Park, Melbourne, 12 November 2011
- Parramatta Park, Sydney, 13 November 2011
- City Botanic Gardens, Brisbane, 19 November 2011

=== Lineup ===
- Portishead
- The Flaming Lips
- The National
- Mogwai
- Bright Eyes
- Clap Your Hands Say Yeah
- TV on the Radio
- Mercury Rev
- Family Stone
- The Walkmen
- Hypnotic Brass Ensemble
- This Town Needs Guns
- Kormac’s Big Band
- Kevin Devine
- Holy Fuck
- Phosphorescent
- Death In Vegas
- Seekae
- PVT
- Dappled Cities
- The Holidays
- Foxy Shazam
- The Cactus Channel

== 2012 ==
The second year of the festival was held in the same Brisbane, Sydney and Melbourne venues. The first lineup announcement was made on 14 June 2012, with a second announcement on 21 August 2012. Tickets went on public sale on 28 June 2012.

=== Locations ===
- Werribee Park, Melbourne, 11 November 2012
- Parramatta Park, Sydney, 17 November 2012
- City Botanic Gardens, Brisbane, 18 November 2012

=== Lineup ===
- Beck
- Sigur Rós
- Grizzly Bear
- Mike Patton's Mondo Cane
- Ben Folds Five
- Santigold
- Beirut
- Cake
- The Dandy Warhols
- The Black Angels
- Chromatics
- Ozomatli
- Liars
- Fuck Buttons
- The War on Drugs
- Dark Dark Dark
- Dexys Midnight Runners
- Silversun Pickups
- Crazy P
- Dark Horses
- River City Extension
- Los Campesinos
- Winter People

== Proposed 2013 lineup and cancellation ==
With rumours already circulating of a third installment of Harvest, on 8 May 2013 the first official details were released by Maddah along with Neutral Milk Hotel leaking their inclusion as the first band on the lineup after a 15-year hiatus. The Eels also leaked their inclusion on the festival ahead of the official announcement.

On 26 June 2013 it was revealed that Soundwave Touring was having possible issues locking in a Sydney venue due to conflicts with the government.

The first lineup announcement was made on 28 June 2013. with a second announcement on 21 August 2012. Tickets went on public sale on 28 June 2012.

On 9 September 2013, Maddah released a series of comments on Twitter raising concern that the future of the festival could be in doubt, blaming "lack of interest" and Big Day Out festival for a lack of available bands to book as their festival started to shift into a more "Harvest-centric line-up".

The future of the festival was put into uncertainty when Maddah expressed on 12 September 2013 "that pressing ahead with the event is "too risky" and is making other arrangements to salvage Australian appearances by the acts featured on the already announced bill". A second announcement had been planned, but ticket sales were low with "the promoter telling Fairfax that just 18% of the 17,500 tickets for Harvest's Brisbane event had been sold, and around 30-40% of the 20,000 tickets for Sydney. Melbourne was selling slightly better at 70-80% of 15,000 tickets" and that left him facing a potential loss of $5.5 million.

The Black Rebel Motorcycle Club band announced that the festival had been cancelled ahead of any confirmation from Soundwave Touring. In the next few hours, it was announced that Maddah had bought a part share in the competition, the Big Day Out festival, announced that the festival looked to be 99% cancelled, then a few hours later he announced via Twitter that the 2013 festival had been officially cancelled. Many of the bands on the lineup would be rebooked for their own individual shows or would be moved to the Soundwave or Big Day Out lineups where appropriate.

In 2014, Maddah put any possible rumours to rest that Harvest would return in 2014

The remaining two festivals that Maddah was involved in running were also cancelled in the next few years, Big Day Out was cancelled in 2014 and Soundwave in 2016.

=== Locations ===
- Werribee Park, Melbourne, 10 November 2013
- The Domain, Sydney, 16 November 2013
- City Botanic Gardens, Brisbane, 17 November 2013

=== Lineup (First Announcement) ===
- Massive Attack
- Franz Ferdinand
- Primus
- Goldfrapp
- Neutral Milk Hotel
- Desaparecidos
- Eels
- CSS
- Mutemath
- The Drones
- Black Rebel Motorcycle Club
- M Ward
- Superchunk
- The Wallflowers
- Walk Off The Earth
