= Laced/Unlaced =

Studio album by Emilie Autumn
- Released: March 9, 2007
- Genre: Baroque, Renaissance, electro-industrial
- Length: 108:09
- Label: Trisol Music Group

Emilie Autumn chronology
Liar / Dead is the New Alive (2007)	Laced/Unlaced (2007)	A Bit o' This & That (2007)

Laced/Unlaced is a two-disc instrumental album by Emilie Autumn, released in 2007 by Trisol Music Group. Disc one, "Laced", is a re-release of On a Day..., Autumn's fledgling record, with the addition of several previously unreleased live recordings from her teenage years. Disc two, "Unlaced", contains all electric violin recordings. A limited-edition CD + book set was released on March 9, 2007 with just 2000 copies being printed worldwide, and the jewel case album was re-released on June 15.

== Track listing ==
Disc One: "Laced"
No.	Title	Writer(s)	Length
1.	"La Folia"	Arcangelo Corelli	10:18
2.	"Recercada"	Diego Ortiz	1:43
3.	"Largo"	Johann Sebastian Bach	4:02
4.	"Allegro"	Johann Sebastian Bach	3:21
5.	"Adagio"	Jean-Marie Leclair	3:36
6.	"Tambourin"	Jean-Marie Leclair	1:52
7.	"Willow"	Emilie Autumn	5:49
8.	"Revelry"	Emilie Autumn	1:56
9.	"On a Day..."	Emilie Autumn	2:30
Total length:			35:07

Bonus Tracks
No.	Title	Writer(s)	Length
10.	"Prologue" (Live)	Emilie Autumn	2:07
11.	"Sonata for Violin & Basso Continuo" (Live)	Lonati	11:45
12.	"Chaconne" (Live)	Giovanni Battista Vitali	10:24
13.	"La Folia" (Live)	Arcangelo Corelli	9:55
14.	"Epilogue" (Live)	Emilie Autumn	5:09
Total length:			39:20

Disc Two: "Unlaced"
No.	Title	Writer(s)	Length
1.	"Unlaced"	Emilie Autumn	3:26
2.	"Manic Depression"	Emilie Autumn	5:25
3.	"Leech Jar"	Emilie Autumn	4:14
4.	"A Strange Device"	Emilie Autumn	4:16
5.	"A Cure?"	Emilie Autumn	3:06
6.	"Syringe"	Emilie Autumn	3:23
7.	"Cold"	Emilie Autumn	3:02
8.	"Face the Wall"	Emilie Autumn	6:50
Total length:			33:42
