= The Asylum for Wayward Victorian Girls =

2009 novel by Emilie Autumn

- Cover of The Asylum for Wayward Victorian Girls
- Author: Emilie Autumn
- Illustrator: Emilie Autumn
- Language: English
- Genre: Autobiography, psychological thriller
- Publisher: The Asylum Emporium
- Publication date: 2009 (1st edition), 2017 (4th edition)
- Publication place: United States
- Media type: Print (hardcover), Print (softcover)
- Pages: 264 (2nd edition), 392 (4th edition)
- ISBN: 0998990922

Cover of the paperback edition of the book

The Asylum for Wayward Victorian Girls is a semi-autobiographical/psychological thriller novel by Emilie Autumn. It was published in 2009 as a companion to her 2009–2010 North American, European, and Australian tour, the Asylum Tour. The book chronicles Autumn's experiences in a modern-day psych ward as well as those of a fictional young girl, "Emily-with-a-y", in Victorian England who is admitted into an insane asylum. The first and second editions, published in 2010, were large, hardcover, full-color illustrated editions, with glossy pages and weighing nearly five pounds. This version of the book has since been discontinued due to the expense involved in printing, and as of 2017 the book is only available in black-and-white in ebook and paperback forms. An audiobook version, narrated by the author, was released in 2016.

In the style of her earlier Enchant Puzzle, the e-book version contains a treasure hunt called the Quest for Spoon of the Royals, the object of which is a silver spoon adorned with gemstones and crystals, which Autumn claims is hidden "somewhere in the world". The clues for solving the puzzle and finding the spoon are supposedly hidden within this edition of the book. As of 2021, it has yet to be solved.

== Plot ==
Told through the form of journal entries, the novel begins with Emilie's suicide attempt and subsequent forced admission to a psych ward. What was initially intended as a 72-hour hold turns into a longer stay when there is no room for her in the short-term ward and she is moved to the long-term ward. Emilie begins to describe the events of her life that led to her suicide attempt, including abuse she suffered both as a child and in her romantic relationships, and her experiences with bipolar disorder. She also documents the sad conditions in the hospital, from the inadequate food and overcrowding to the invasive way she and the other patients are watched and monitored by the doctors and nurses. She meets with Dr. Sharp, who seems to take an interest in her. Emilie attempts to befriend a fellow patient, Chloe, but Chloe is taken for electro shock therapy at four in the morning, and Emilie never sees her again. Emilie soon begins finding notes stuck in-between the pages of her own journal. Diary entries themselves, referred to as "Asylum Letters", the notes appear to be very old and purport to be written by a girl from 1800s London named Emily (referred to throughout the book as "Emily-with-a-y"), whose life bears striking similarity to Emilie's own.

Emily describes being born into poverty and joining the Unfortunate Girl's Music Conservatoire at a young age, where she is trained as a violinist. When Emily grows up, she learns that the Conservatoire is a front for a form of human trafficking where young girls are only trained to be sold to the highest bidder. She is sold into the Servitude of the Count de Rothsberg and made to entertain him and live with him in his mansion, forced to suffer his abuses. There, Emily forms a friendship and alliance with a maid, Anne, who gives her a skeleton key to the mansion. Together they make an escape attempt that ends with both of them jumping from a bridge into the Thames. Emily survives, but never sees Anne again. Emily begins to wander the streets of London and is soon arrested and taken into the custody of Madame Mournington, the headmistress of the Asylum for Wayward Victorian Girls. Emily is admitted to the asylum, where the head physician, Dr. Stockill, seems to take special interest in her. The building is squalid and decaying, haunted by ghosts, with striped wallpaper peeling off the walls. The meals are often rancid; in one instance a dead rat is found in the soup. Emily, along with the other inmates, are frequently subject to experimentation, torture, and sexual exploitation at the hands of the doctors and orderlies, or "chasers". However, Emily begins to become acquainted with life in the asylum, eventually being inducted into The Striped Stocking Society, a secret group of sane women within the Asylum (the name being a reference to the uniform the inmates wear; a white shift dress and striped stockings). She also comes to befriend Sir Edward and Basil, two talking rats.

Emily and the other inmates are exhibited in a circus-freak-show-style event known as "the Ophelia Gallery", where members of the public can pay to come and gawk at them. They are also forced by the doctors into a prostitution ring, with their pictures being shown to potential customers. Emily befriends the unwitting photographer, a man called Thomson, but once Thomson learns what his photographs are being used for and vows to help her escape, she never sees him again.

As conditions in the Asylum deteriorate, and the experiments on the girls become more extreme, Madame Mournington, who is also Dr. Stockill's mother, gives in to her conscience and gives Emily the key to the Asylum before taking her own life. Emily attempts to free the other girls, but is overpowered by Dr. Stockill. However, the key that Anne gave Emily begins to glow and takes on supernatural powers, and is inexplicably able to open the Asylum gates. The inmates take over the Asylum as the clock strikes four, taking their revenge on and killing the doctors and chasers who have tortured them for so many years, an event referred to as "the Tea Party Massacre". With Emily as their new leader, the girls turn the newly freed Asylum into a real sanctuary and continue to accept and care for new girls when they are dropped at the Asylum's doorstep. On New Year's Eve, as the girls celebrate on the rooftop, the decaying building begins to collapse, and Emily and the other girls jump to their deaths in a mass suicide.

In the present day, Emilie can not accept that the letters end there and that that is all there is to the story. She goes back through the previous letters only to find that they are all actually made of brown paper towel from the hospital bathroom, incoherently scribbled over with red crayon. Emilie begins to have a breakdown, demanding to know who took the real letters, and is forcefully taken by the nurses to an isolated room. There, as she tries to calm herself down, she leans against the wall, noticing a small crack in it. She begins picking at it, then scratching and tearing at the wall, pulling more and more of it away until the striped wallpaper of the Asylum is revealed underneath.

== Characters ==
=== Modern ===
- Emilie: Main character and narrator of the book's Hospital Entries.
- Chloe: Fellow inmate of Emilie who is sent to electro-shock therapy at 4 o'clock in the morning. Emilie never saw her again.
- Kara: Recovering drug addict.
- Violet: Fellow inmate who has been the victim of abuse.
- Dr. Sharpe: Doctor at the mental ward who shows an interest in Emilie.

=== Victorian ===
- Emily: Heroine of The Asylum... in the Victorian era and narrator of the Asylum Letters. She has red hair. Her nickname is "Valentine," for the heart-shaped scar on her cheek.
- Sachiko: Friend of Emily at the Music Conservatoire.
- Count de Rothsberg: Buys Emily with the intent to use and abuse her, like he has done with previous girls before her. Is a patron of Dr. Stockill, and frequents the asylum.
- Anne: A former pupil of the Unfortunate Girl's Music Conservatoire whom Count de Rothsberg deemed unworthy of serving him as an amusement, and is then demoted to the place of scullery maid.
- Dr. Stockill: The lead doctor at the Asylum, interested in creating toxic compounds and administering his concoctions to the inmates. Son of Madame Mournington.
- Madame Mournington: Headmistress of the Asylum. Mother of Dr. Stockill. Supposedly mourning the death of her infant daughter from years before.
- Jolie Rouge: Fellow inmate. Her hair is blonde and she also wears the hair of her deceased sister as a form of mourning jewelry. She states she is a pirate and is always telling stories of her adventures. She wears a three-cornered paper pirate hat and others call her "Captain."
- Veronica: Highly nymphomanic inmate who is convinced that she is leaving the next day, every day.
- Thomson: Photographer in the Asylum who takes photos of Emily for a special project.
- Sir Edward: Lead rat who speaks to Emily and brings her paper to write on.
- Basil: Rat who speaks to Emily and is an assistant to Sir Edward.
- Christelle: Fellow inmate. She is French and spends her time spinning in circles, singing songs in her native language.
- Joanna: Fellow inmate. She was once married and is a compulsive liar.

== Background and themes ==
As a partially autobiographical work, the book is based heavily on Autumn's experiences with bipolar disorder, psychiatric hospitalization, abuse, and misogyny. Autumn described the writing process as "painful, and necessary, and cathartic". The book was intended as a criticism of the state of modern mental healthcare by comparing it to that of the Victorian era; Autumn stated "you’ll learn there’s very little difference from asylums for ladies in 1841 and the ones for us now." She also intended it as an empowering statement, saying "This is about what happens when the inmates finally join together and fight back against their abusers. I want to make my asylum what an asylum should be – a sanctuary."

== Musical adaptation ==
In March 2012, Autumn discussed her intention to write a full length "Broadway-style" musical based on The Asylum. In July of that year, Autumn released the album Fight Like a Girl, which is based on the events of the book, and which she referred to as a "preview" of the musical. On September 22, 2018, she released The Asylum for Wayward Victorian Girls: Behind the Musical, which features several songs written for the musical.
