= The Devil's Carnival =

- Theatrical poster
- Directed by: Darren Lynn Bousman
- Written by: Terrance Zdunich
- Produced by: Darren Lynn Bousman; Sean E. Demott
- Starring: Emilie Autumn; Sean Patrick Flanery; Briana Evigan; Jessica Lowndes; Paul Sorvino; Terrance Zdunich; Bill Moseley
- Cinematography: Joseph White
- Edited by: Erin Deck
- Music by: Terrance Zdunich; Saar Hendelman
- Release date: April 5, 2012 (Los Angeles)
- Running time: 56 minutes
- Country: United States
- Language: English
- Budget: $500,000

The Devil's Carnival is a 2012 American musical horror film directed by Darren Lynn Bousman and starring Sean Patrick Flanery, Briana Evigan, Jessica Lowndes, Paul Sorvino, Emilie Autumn and Terrance Zdunich. The film marks the second collaboration of Bousman and writer/actor Terrance Zdunich, their previous work being the musical film Repo! The Genetic Opera. The film also brings back several of the cast members of Repo!, such as Sorvino, Alexa Vega, Bill Moseley and Nivek Ogre. The Devil's Carnival has Aesop's Fables and other folklore at the core of its story, with the main characters each representing a fable. Flanery's character John represents "Grief and His Due", Evigan's character Merrywood represents "The Dog and Its Reflection", and Lowndes' character Tamara represents "The Scorpion and the Frog", an animal fable that seems to have first emerged in Russia.

== Plot ==
John, a grieving father, slits his wrists after losing his son, Daniel. A thief, Ms. Merrywood, is killed in her trailer after a shootout with police. Tamara, a young woman, is killed by her angry boyfriend. All three are greeted by denizens of Hell as they die ("Heaven's All Around").

In Hell, which is a carnival, Lucifer's second-in-command, the Ticket-Keeper, rallies the carnies in a big-top circus tent and calls out the names of the carnies who will be "performing" that night for the recent arrivals. He selects the Painted Doll, a mute woman with a cracked face; the Twin, a reptilian man with the ability to shape-shift; the Hobo Clown; and the Scorpion, a knife-thrower. The Scorpion is absent from the meeting, so Ticket-Keeper sends Painted Doll to find him. Meanwhile, John, Ms. Merrywood, and Tamara all awaken, each finding an envelope containing a ticket to enter. While searching for the entrance, John and Ms. Merrywood bump into each other, and they arrive at Ticket-Keeper's booth as the carnies welcome them to the carnival ("The Devil's Carnival"). Ticket-Keeper then explains all the 666 laws of the Carnival ("666") before welcoming them in.

Tamara, wandering in the back of the Carnival, finds The Scorpion in a cage. She frees him, and he begins to flirt with her. Meanwhile, John finds himself in the Big-Top tent. He is harassed by Wick and her three cohorts, the Woe-Maidens ("Kiss the Girls"). They vanish suddenly, however, and John sees Painted Doll in a kissing booth. She offers him Daniel's location in exchange for a kiss, only to bite off his ear, which spontaneously reappears.

Meanwhile, Daniel meets Lucifer, who begins reading him fables, starting with Aesop's "The Dog and Her Reflection". Ms. Merrywood, follows a pamphlet into a dark tent with the intent of finding a large diamond. The Twin has the diamond, and promises it to her if she wins his "game" before morphing into her. Merrywood, not recognizing her own reflection, loses the game ("Beautiful Stranger"). She is then stripped naked and whipped in front of the carnies, while the Hobo Clown sings retelling of the fable Lucifer is reading ("A Penny for a Tale").

Lucifer begins reading Daniel another fable, "The Scorpion and The Frog." Tamara is continually wooed by the Scorpion. She follows him into a dark tent where a knife-throwing wheel has been set up, and finds him and the Painted Doll kissing. Embarrassed, she tries to leave, but Scorpion angrily accuses her of not trusting him, which she denies. He straps her to his knife-throwing wheel, before throwing a switch-blade directly into Tamara's heart, killing her ("Trust Me"). The Painted Doll then retells the fable to the carnies through song, showing off Tamara's body for them ("Prick! Goes the Scorpion's Tale").

Lucifer reads one final fable for Daniel, "The Devil and His Due". John stumbles through a tent, even passing through a replica of the bathroom where he committed suicide ("Grief"). John, distraught over losing his son, claims Heaven has abandoned both Daniel and himself. John finds Daniel in Lucifer's study, only for Daniel to morph into the Fool, a dwarf carnie, much to Lucifer's amusement and John's dismay. Lucifer taunts John, revealing to him that he is in fact in Hell as he could not let go of his grief. John weeps but eventually decides he no longer wants to grieve, and Lucifer sends John to Heaven.

Later, Lucifer rallies the carnies, announcing a plan to offer the condemned souls redemption and thus, access to Heaven ("Grace for Sale"). Ticket-Keeper informs the carnies that, come tomorrow, they will wage war with God and his angels, in order to "put Heaven out of business." The carnies excitedly celebrate ("Off to Hell We Go").

In a post-credits scene, Tamara finds Lucifer in the big-top tent. She blindly trusts and allows him to seduce her like she did with the Scorpion, ultimately repeating the sin that brought her to Hell ("In All My Dreams I Drown").

== Cast ==
- Sean Patrick Flanery as John
- Briana Evigan as Ms. Kathleen Merrywood
- Jessica Lowndes as Tamara
- Dayton Callie as The Ticket Keeper
- Paul Sorvino as God
- Terrance Zdunich as The Devil
- Alexa PenaVega as Wick
- J. Larose as The Major
- Bill Moseley as The Magician
- Emilie Autumn as The Painted Doll
- Nivek Ogre as The Twin
- Marc Senter as The Scorpion
- Mighty Mike Murga as The Fool
- Shawn Crahan as The Tamer
- Ivan Moody as The Hobo Clown
- Tillman Norsworthy as Daniel
- Hannah "Minx" Wagner as Woe-Maiden
- Maggie "Captain Maggot" Lally as Woe-Maiden
- Beth "The Blessed Contessa" Hinderliter as Woe-Maiden

== Production ==
Bousman and Zdunich began developing the concept during discussions about a possible sequel for Repo! The Genetic Opera. The two eventually came up with The Devil's Carnival after not developing a Repo! sequel "for multiple reasons".

=== Filming ===
Principal photography for The Devil's Carnival wrapped in mid January 2012 and went into post-production, it was filmed on-location in Riverside, California. with Noise Creep reporting that Slipknot's Shawn Crahan would be participating in his first acting role.

=== Music ===
The soundtrack was released digitally on Amazon and iTunes on April 3, 2012, with limited edition CDs being sold on the road tour stops.

No.	Title	Performer(s)	Length
1.	"Heaven's All Around"	Paul Sorvino	3:39
2.	"The Devil's Carnival"	Alexa Vega, Mighty Mike and Bill Moseley	2:17
3.	"In All My Dreams I Drown †"	Jessica Lowndes and Terrance Zdunich	2:29
4.	"666"	Dayton Callie and The Carnies	1:33
5.	"Kiss the Girls"	Alexa Vega and The Woe Maidens	1:04
6.	"Beautiful Stranger"	Nivek Ogre and Briana Evigan	2:57
7.	"A Penny for a Tale"	Ivan Moody	3:36
8.	"Trust Me"	Marc Senter	2:07
9.	"Prick! Goes the Scorpion's Tail"	Emilie Autumn	3:56
10.	"Grief"	Sean Patrick Flanery	3:19
11.	"Grace for Sale"	Terrance Zdunich	2:56
12.	"Off to Hell We Go †"	The Carnies	1:29

Sinner Extended Edition
No.	Title	Performer(s)	Length
1.	"Storytime/Heaven's All Around"	Paul Sorvino	3:44
2.	"Tears, John/The Devil's Carnival"	Alexa Vega, Mighty Mike and Bill Moseley	2:26
3.	"In All My Dreams I Drown †"	Jessica Lowndes and Terrance Zdunich	2:26
4.	"It's Showtime (Score)"	Dayton Callie	0:26
5.	"666"	Dayton Callie and The Carnies	1:33
6.	"Kiss the Girls"	Alexa Vega and The Woe Maidens	1:04
7.	"The Midway (Score)"	Terrance Zdunich	0:17
8.	"The Dog & Her Reflection/Beautiful Stranger"	Nivek Ogre, Briana Evigan and Terrance Zdunich	3:00
9.	"A Penny for a Tale"	Ivan Moody	3:35
10.	"You're Prettier Anyhow (Score)"	Marc Senter	0:48
11.	"The Scorpion And The Frog/Trust Me"	Marc Senter	2:20
12.	"Prick! Goes the Scorpion's Tail"	Emilie Autumn	3:55
13.	"The Devil & His Due"	Terrance Zdunich	0:47
14.	"Grief (Alternate Cut)"	Sean Patrick Flanery, Terrance Zdunich	3:15
15.	"Grace for Sale"	Terrance Zdunich	2:56
16.	"Off to Hell We Go †"	The Carnies	1:24
17.	"666 (Web Teaser Version)"	Terrance Zdunich	1:41
18.	"The Devil's Carnival (Web Teaser Version)"	Terrance Zdunich	1:26
19.	"Painted Doll Teaser Background Soundscape ††"	Terrance Zdunich	13:24

Notes
† Appear during the end credits only.
†† Physical CD Exclusive

== Marketing ==
A trailer featuring singer Emilie Autumn was released in late December 2011. The Hollywood Reporter quotes Bousman as saying that the movie is "more accessible than Repo but also a lot darker than Repo" and that The Devil's Carnival will be receiving a multi-city road tour starting in April 2012 and a 12-song album.

Bousman and Zdunich have stated that The Devil's Carnival will be an ongoing project, with episode two already being written. The two have stated that due to the project being self-funded, episode two will be produced if they make back the costs for episode one. At the Boston stop of the Encore Road Tour, Bousman and Zdunich revealed that both episodes two and three have been written, and that casting has begun on Episode 2, with production tentatively to begin at the end of the year.

=== Deleted scenes ===
On March 22, 2012, the music video for "In All My Dreams I Drown" was released onto the internet. The song was intended to be placed within the film itself, but was ultimately moved to the end credits due to it "not flowing with the rest of the film". According to Bousman, "In All My Dreams I Drown" was originally after the song "The Devil's Carnival". Tamara would find herself in the carnival ring, be seduced by Lucifer, then awake again, being rendered redundant.

== Reception ==
The Devil's Carnival received positive reviews from critics. Artist Direct gave the film 4.5 out of 5 stars, praising the film's aesthetics and performances. The Phoenix New Times also praised The Devil's Carnival, saying that the "plot and soundtrack were darkly, enchantingly comedic". Dread Central gave the movie 4 out of 5 blades, praising the movie as "subversive and infectious". Scott Weinberg of Fearnet also reviewed the film, writing, "Dismiss Repo and Carnival as weird musicals for weird people if you like, but there's always room for a filmmaker who treats his ticket-buyers well and delivers something sort of ... unsafe." Firstshowing.net cited the soundtrack as a highlight of the movie, also stating that the "tale crescendos at the start of a new story, that sinister plot the Devil was keeping under his horns". HorrorNews.net praised the film, writing that the movie itself could not be reviewed without first discussing the atmosphere, "This isn’t a film you’re seeing; remember that you’re going to have an 'experience.'"

== Home media ==
Bousman and Zdunich announced in August 2012 that the film would be released in DVD and Blu-ray on October 23, 2012. The movie was released in two editions, a "Ringmaster" collector's edition and a "Sinners" version. The "Ringmaster" edition is a Blu-ray/DVD combo pack limited to 6,660 copies whereas the "Sinner" edition is a DVD packaged with an extended soundtrack sold exclusively at Hot Topic. The Ringmaster's edition features audio commentary tracks from the cast and crew and several features on the making of the film.

On October 28, 2014, the film was rereleased on a Blu-ray/DVD Combo Pack. This release is virtually identical to the Ringmaster edition of the Blu-ray, except the lyric booklet has been removed and the cover art was altered.

== Episode Two ==
Bousman described the project with "Episode Two will pull back the curtain on Heaven... and in The Devil's Carnival, God and his angels are a whole lot darker than Lucifer and his carnies." On December 25, 2012, a teaser trailer was released, revealing that Tech N9ne was starring in the role of "The Librarian". On January 10, 2013, a nine-minute trailer was released, focusing on The Librarian, a few of the angels, and their dark practices of Heaven. Also, major actors such as Barry Bostwick (The Rocky Horror Picture Show) and Ted Neeley (Jesus Christ Superstar) have been cast. On June 26, 2014 Bousman posted on his blog that production on episode two had officially begun.

Alleluia! The Devil's Carnival premiered on August 11, 2015, in Los Angeles, and subsequently began a North American Roadshow release on August 26, 2015, in Tucson, Arizona, ending on October 18 in Los Angeles.
