= Dayton Callie =

American actor (born 1946)

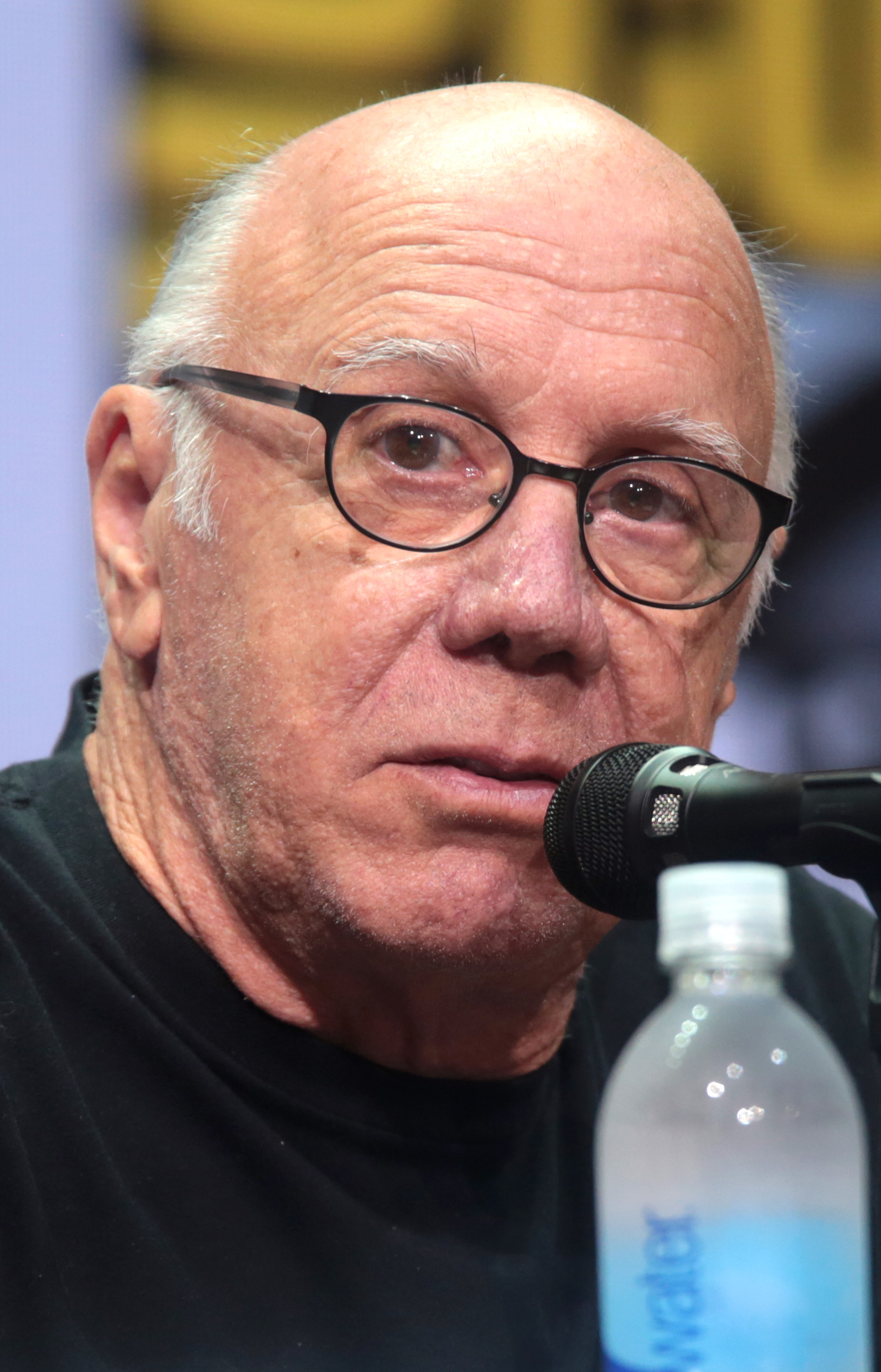
- Callie at the 2017 San Diego Comic-Con
- Born: 1946 (age 79–80); Newark, New Jersey, U.S.
- Occupations: Actor, screenwriter
- Years active: 1984–present
- Known for: Deadwood; Sons of Anarchy; Fear the Walking Dead

Dayton Callie (born 1946 in Newark, New Jersey, USA) is an American actor, best known for playing Charlie Utter on HBO's Deadwood, Police Chief Wayne Unser on Sons of Anarchy, and Jeremiah Otto on AMC's Fear the Walking Dead. He has also voiced Whitaker in Valve's Left 4 Dead 2, appeared in Halloween II, and had small roles in episodes of The Unit and Seinfeld. He was also in two episodes of the short-lived NBC series The Cape as the Mayor, and had a three-episode arc on CSI.

== Filmography ==
=== Film ===
Year	Title	Role	Notes
1984	Preppies	Breakdancer	
1989	Alien Space Avenger	Sleazy Navy Vet	Uncredited
1990	Going Under	General Confusion	
1995	The Last Word	Encee	
1995	To Wong Foo, Thanks for Everything! Julie Newmar	Crazy Elijah	
1996	The Last Days of Frankie the Fly	Vic	Also screenwriter
1997	Volcano	Roger Lapher	
1997	Executive Target	Bela	Also screenwriter
1997	Lesser Prophets	Bernie	
2001	Boss of Bosses	Aniello Dellacroce	
2002	Derailed	Lars	
2002	Undisputed	Yank Lewis	
2002	Turn of Faith	Patty Murphy	
2003	Ash Tuesday	Uncle Louie	
2005	Break a Leg	Saul Rubin	
2007	7-10 Split	Mr. Baxter	
2007	The Pink Conspiracy	Beaver	
2007	The Final Season	Mr. Stewart	
2008	New Orleans, Mon Amour	Utterman	
2009	Halloween II	Coroner Hooks	
2011	Few Options	Warden Winslow	
2012	The Devil's Carnival	Ticket Keeper	
2012	The Motel Life	Uncle Gary	
2015	Alleluia! The Devil's Carnival	Ticket Keeper	
2016	Abattoir	Jebediah Crone	
2018	City of Lies	Lt. O'Shea	

=== Television ===
Year	Title	Role	Notes
1987	Kate & Allie	Customer #2	Episode: "The Nightmare Before Christmas"
1987	At Mother's Request	Citipostal Worker	TV movie
1989	Valerie's Family	Orderly	Episode: "License to Drive"
1989	Adam-12	Bar Owner	Episode: "Going Home"
1990	Beauty and the Beast	Hitman	Episode: "Invictus"
1990	Falcon Crest	Man #1	Episode: "Finding Lauren"
1990	Growing Pains	Otis	Episode: "Midnight Cowboy"
1990	DEA	Cord	Episode: "Bloodsport"
1990	Law & Order	Monaghan	Episode: "Poison Ivy"
1990	Return to Green Acres	Bull Dozer Driver	TV movie
1991	Gabriel's Fire	Uniformed Officer	Episode: "Belly of the Beast"
1992	Room for Two	Uncredited	Episode: "My Right Foot"
1992	Reasonable Doubts	Sergio	Episode: "Moment of Doubt"
1993	Murphy Brown	Security Guard	Episode: "Bump in the Night"
1994	The Nanny	The Sergeant	Episode: "The Nanny Napper"
1995	Ed McBain's 87th Precinct: Lightning	Monroe	TV movie
1995	Tyson	Sportswriter #1	TV movie
1995	Body Language	Frank DeMarco	TV movie
1995	VR.5	Uncredited	Episode: "Escape"
1995	Deadly Games	Cop	Episode: "Motivational Speaker"
1995	NYPD Blue	Larry Sinks	Episode: "A Murder with Teeth in It"
1997	Ellen	The Father of the Gay Son	Episode: "Hello Muddah, Hello Faddah"
1997	Profiler	Uncredited	Episode: "Power Corrupts"
1997	Michael Hayes	Uncredited	Episode: "Retribution"
1998	Seinfeld	Cabbie	Episode: "The Puerto Rican Day"
1998	Buddy Faro	Tommy Fusco	Episode: "Pilot"
1998	The Tony Danza Show	Uncle Lou	Episode: "A Christmas Story"
1998	Vengeance Unlimited	Chuck Bidally	2 episodes
1999	NYPD Blue	Gary Zancanelli	Episode: "Show and Tell"
1999	It's Like, You Know...	Convict #2	Episode: "The Conversation"
2000	Becker	Leo Arnold	Episode: "One Angry Man"
2000	The Practice	Francis Lupino	Episode: "The Deal"
2001	Cover Me: Based on the True Life of an FBI Family	Ed Linson	Episode: "Vegas Mother's Day: Part 2"
2001	Roswell	Joey Firrini	2 episodes
2001	Boss of Bosses	Neil Dellacroce	TV movie
2002	Touched by an Angel	Rocco	Episode: "Forever Young"
2002	Port Charles	Landlord	2 episodes
2002	The Jamie Kennedy Experiment	Tony-Florist	Episode: "Flower Shop"
2002	Women vs. Men	Pizza Man	TV movie
2002	Nancy Drew	Desk Cop #1	TV movie
2003	L.A. Dragnet	Peter Carey	Episode: "The Brass Ring"
2003	CSI: Miami	Adams-Parole Officer	Episode: "Grave Young Men"
2003	Judging Amy	Officer Curtis	Episode: "CSO: Hartford"
2004–2006	Deadwood	Charlie Utter	33 episodes
2006	The Closer	Martin DeLuca	Episode: "Overkill"
2006–2007	CSI: Crime Scene Investigation	Ernie Dell	3 episodes
2007	John from Cincinnati	Steady Freddie Lopez	9 episodes
2007	K-Ville	Angelo Dante	Episode: "Boulet in a China Shop"
2008–2014	Sons of Anarchy	Wayne Unser	80 episodes
2009	The Unit	Middle Aged Man	Episode: "The Last Nazi"
2009	In Plain Sight		Episode: "Who's Bugging Mary?"
2011	The Cape	Mayor Stewart Welkins	2 episodes
2012	The Booth at the End	Jack	5 episodes
2013	Archer	Veterinarian (voice)	Episode: "Coyote Lovely"
2014	Law & Order: Special Victims Unit	Judge Dolan	Episode: "Jersey Breakdown"
2016–2017	Fear the Walking Dead	Jeremiah Otto	Guest (Season 2); Main role (Season 3); 8 episodes
2019	Deadwood: The Movie	Charlie Utter	

=== Video games ===
Year	Title	Voice
2009	Left 4 Dead 2	Whitaker; Additional voices

== Awards and nominations ==
Year	Association	Category	Nominated work	Result
2007	Screen Actors Guild Awards	Outstanding Performance by an Ensemble in a Drama Series	Deadwood	Nominated
