= A Bit o' This & That =

Compilation album by Emilie Autumn
- Released: April 23, 2007
- Genre: Baroque, dark cabaret, avant-garde, electronica, classical
- Length: 76:14
- Label: Trisol Music Group

Emilie Autumn chronology
Laced/Unlaced (2007)	A Bit o' This & That (2007)	4 O'Clock (2008)

A Bit o' This & That is a compilation album by Emilie Autumn that includes rarities, b-sides, remixes, covers, and music from her early years. It was released on August 3, 2007 in a limited edition digipak format, with just 3000 copies being distributed worldwide. It was re-released on February 29, 2008, in a standard digibook format.

== Track listing ==
No.	Title	Writer(s)	Length
1.	"Chambermaid" (Space Mix)	Emilie Autumn	6:49
2.	"What If" (Celtic Mix)	Emilie Autumn	4:26
3.	"Hollow Like My Soul"	Mykel Boyd, Arr. Emilie Autumn	4:49
4.	"By the Sword"	Emilie Autumn	5:11
5.	"I Don't Care Much" (from Cabaret)	John Kander, Fred Ebb	4:54
6.	"I Know It's Over" (Live Recording)	Morrissey, Johnny Marr	6:45
7.	"Find Me a Man"	Emilie Autumn	5:08
8.	"O Mistress Mine" (words by William Shakespeare)	Emilie Autumn	5:30
9.	"The Star-Spangled Banner"	Francis Scott Key	1:49
10.	"All My Loving"	The Beatles	2:11
11.	"Sonata in D Minor for Violin and Continuo" (Instrumental; Live Recording)	Francesco Maria Veracini	9:33
12.	"Ancient Grounds" (Instrumental; Live Recording)	Emilie Autumn	5:41
13.	"Always Look on the Bright Side of Life" (Instrumental)	Eric Idle	3:39
14.	"With Every Passing Day" (from the BBC's "Upstairs Downstairs")	Alexander Faris	1:56
15.	"Miss Lucy Had Some Leeches" (Live Recording); Hidden Tracks: "Photographic Memory" "Crazy He Calls Me"	Emilie Autumn Emilie Autumn; Bob Russell, Carl Sigman	7:53
Total length:			76:14
