= Yoshiki (musician) =

Japanese musician (born 1965)

- 林 佳樹
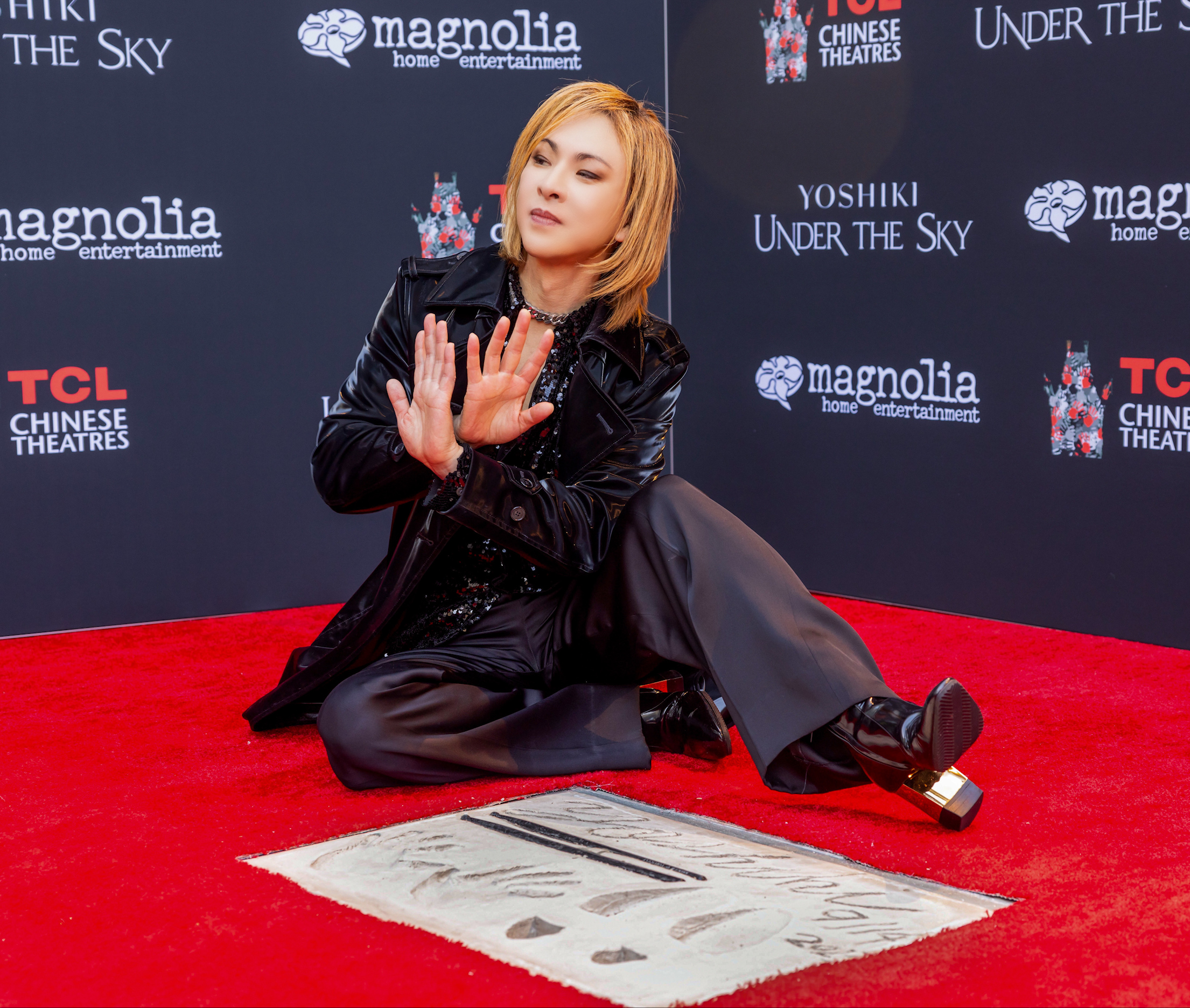
- Yoshiki at Hollywood TCL Theatre on January 9, 2024
- Born: Yoshiki Hayashi; November 20, 1965 (age 60); Tateyama, Chiba, Japan
- Occupations: Musician; songwriter; composer; record producer; entrepreneur; fashion designer; film director
- Years active: 1982–present
- Agent: WME Group
- Awards: Time 100 Most Influential People; Variety International Achievement in Music; MAMA Awards Favorite International Artist; Forbes Asia 30 Heroes of Philanthropy; Entertainment Community Fund Medal of Honor; Japan Government Medal of Honor (Dark Blue Ribbon); Asian Hall of Fame
- Musical career
- Genres: Classical; rock; pop; heavy metal
- Instruments: Drums; piano
- Labels: Extasy; Columbia; Avex; Warner; EMI; Sony; Universal
- Member of: X Japan; The Last Rockstars
- Formerly of: S.K.I.N.; Globe

Japanese name
- Kanji: 林 佳樹
- Hiragana: はやし よしき
Transcriptions
- Romanization: Hayashi Yoshiki

YouTube information
- Channel: Yoshiki
- Subscribers: 1.35 million
- Views: 506 million
- Last updated: November 4, 2026
- Website: yoshiki.net

Yoshiki Hayashi (Japanese: 林 佳樹, Hepburn: Hayashi Yoshiki; born November 20, 1965), known mononymously as Yoshiki, is a Japanese musician, songwriter, composer, record producer, film director, and fashion designer. He is best known as the leader of the visual kei rock bands X Japan and the Last Rockstars, for which he is the drummer, pianist, and main songwriter. He has been described by Billboard as a "musical innovator" and named "one of the most influential composers in Japanese history" by Consequence. Time labeled Yoshiki as "an absolute force" and "one of Japan's most celebrated musicians". Yoshiki's solo career includes several classical studio albums and collaborations with artists such as George Martin, Bono, will.i.am, St. Vincent, the Chainsmokers, Skrillex, Ellie Goulding, Stan Lee, Roger Taylor and Brian May of Queen, Gene Simmons and Kiss, Nicole Scherzinger, Sarah Brightman, Jonas Brothers, Jonathan Davis of Korn, Diana Ross, and Josh Groban.

In 1999, at the request of the Japanese Imperial family, he composed and performed a classical song at a celebration in honor of the tenth anniversary of Emperor Akihito's enthronement. Yoshiki also composed the theme for the 69th Golden Globe Awards as well as for several anime and film soundtracks including Attack on Titan and Saw IV. In 2023, he made his directorial debut with the feature documentary film Yoshiki: Under the Sky.

In 2018, readers and professional musicians voted Yoshiki the best drummer and the best keyboardist in the history of hard rock and heavy metal in We Rock magazine's "Metal General Election". In 2023, he was selected as the first Japanese artist to be honored with a hand and footprint ceremony at the Grauman's Chinese Theatre in Hollywood in nearly 100 years. In 2024, Variety selected Yoshiki as the International Achievement in Music honoree. Time named Yoshiki one of the most influential people of 2025 in their Time 100 list.

== Life and career ==
=== 1965–1982: early years and Dynamite/Noise ===
Yoshiki was born on November 20, 1965, in Tateyama, Chiba Prefecture, as the elder of two brothers in a musically oriented family. His father was a tap dancer and jazz pianist, his mother played the shamisen, while his aunt played the koto. He began taking piano lessons and music theory at age four. He then became interested in classical works by Ludwig van Beethoven and Franz Schubert. In elementary school, he played the trumpet in the brass band, and around age ten started composing songs for piano. This period was a decisive point in his life. He was 10 years old when his father died by suicide; he found relief in rock music. After discovering the music of American hard rock band Kiss, he started learning to play drums and guitar. Yoshiki was also influenced by works from Led Zeppelin, Iron Maiden, Sex Pistols, David Bowie, Queen, the Beatles, Charged GBH and Pyotr Ilyich Tchaikovsky. Yoshiki formed the band Dynamite with his childhood friend Toshi in 1977. Dynamite changed its name to Noise a year later.

=== 1982–1997: X Japan ===
When Noise disbanded in 1982, Yoshiki and Toshi formed a new band, which they named X while they tried to think of another name, but the name stuck. In 1986, Yoshiki founded his own independent record label, Extasy Records, in order to distribute the band's music. On December 26, 1987, the band participated in an audition held by CBS/Sony which led to a recording contract in August of the following year. The band's breakthrough came in 1989 with the release of their second, and major debut, album Blue Blood, which reached number six on the Oricon chart and charted for more than 100 weeks. In 1990, the band received the "Grand Prix New Artist of the Year" award at the 4th Japan Gold Disc Awards. In 1991 they released their hit million-selling album Jealousy, and were the first Japanese metal band to perform in Japan's largest indoor concert venue, the Tokyo Dome. The following year they announced the renaming of the band to X Japan in order to launch an international career with an American album release, however, this ultimately did not happen.

=== 1991–1999: solo work and Eternal Melody ===
In 1991, Yoshiki began his first solo activities outside X. Collaborating with Tetsuya Komuro for the rock unit V2, with a concert on December 5 at the Tokyo Bay NK Hall and the single "Haitoku no Hitomi ~Eyes of Venus~/Virginity" (背徳の瞳〜Eyes of Venus〜) in January 1992, which reached number two on the chart. On December 12, Yoshiki released his first album, the classical compilation Yoshiki Selection, which includes classical works, and its sequel followed six years later.

In 1992, he bought a recording studio complex in North Hollywood, California, US. Extasy Recording Studios would become where recordings for nearly all his projects take place, until he sold it in the 2010s. In the early 1990s through his record label would debut million-selling bands Glay and Luna Sea. He began learning about jazz improvisation and orchestration.

On April 21, 1993, he released his first original solo album, the classical studio album Eternal Melody, which was performed by the London Philharmonic Orchestra and produced by the Beatles producer George Martin. Besides including orchestral arrangements of X Japan songs, it contained two new songs as well. The album reached number 6 on the charts. On November 3, the singles "Amethyst" and "Ima wo Dakishimete" (今を抱きしめて) were released and reached number five and three respectively on the charts. The later single was a karaoke adaptation of the second orchestral song from the first single, but name credit went to TBS as it was the theme song to one of their dramas, recorded by the lead actors under the group name NOA. In 1994, it was the 35th annual best-selling single and won the "Excellence award" at the 36th Japan Record Awards.

In 1994, Yoshiki worked with Queen drummer Roger Taylor on a song he composed, "Foreign Sand", for which Roger wrote the lyrics. They performed the song at The Great Music Experience event in May, partly backed by Unesco, which featured many other Japanese and Western musicians. The single was released in June, and reached the top fifteen in Japan, and 26th in the UK. That same month, the Kiss tribute album Kiss My Ass was released, for which Yoshiki contributed an orchestral arrangement of "Black Diamond" played by the American Symphony Orchestra.

With X Japan's popularity increasing, Yoshiki and the band collaborated with Mugen Motorsports and sponsored racer Katsumi Yamamoto, who drove for team "X Japan Racing" in the 1995 season of Formula Nippon. In the 1996 season, they sponsored Ralf Schumacher with both him and the team winning the championship. In 1997, Toshi decided to leave the band, claiming the success-oriented life of a rock star failed to satisfy him emotionally. The band's dissolution was officially announced in September 1997. X Japan performed their farewell show at the Tokyo Dome on December 31, 1997, making it the last of five consecutive New Year's Eve shows in that stadium. Soon afterwards, in May 1998, the band's lead guitarist Hide died, and Yoshiki withdrew from the public scene, as he was battling suicidal thoughts and eventually sought the help of a psychiatrist.

Yoshiki remained active as a producer for bands such as Dir En Grey, and contributed a cover song for the 1999 Hide tribute album, Tribute Spirits. On November 12, 1999, a celebration in honor of the tenth anniversary of Emperor Akihito's enthronement was held at the Tokyo Imperial Palace, for which Yoshiki composed and performed the song "Anniversary" at the request of the Imperial family.

=== 2000–2009: Eternal Melody II, Violet UK and S.K.I.N. ===
In the beginning of the 21st century, he expanded his record label with sub-divisions, Extasy Japan and Extasy International in collaboration with Warner Music, and produced several artists. In 2000, he collaborated with 7-Eleven on a series of TV commercials, for which he provided the songs "Blind Dance" and "The Other Side" by his solo musical project Violet UK. Two years prior, he contributed the song "Sane" for the 1998 film In God's Hands. The project idea was born in 1991, when Yoshiki was recording in his studio, initially doing sessions with Mick Karn and Jane Child, but it was postponed. The music involves a fusion of trip rock, breakbeat, and classical piano strings.

In September 2002, he joined the dance-oriented pop group led by Tetsuya Komuro, Globe. Though his only contribution was the single "Seize the Light" and, after recording an album, they went on hiatus with Yoshiki not rejoining them afterwards. On December 3 and 4, he held symphonic concerts with the Tokyo Philharmonic Orchestra, at Tokyo International Forum. Featuring female singers Daughter and Nicole Scherzinger, they performed older orchestral arrangements and songs created for Violet UK, such as "Unnamed Song", which was composed to mourn the victims of the September 11 attacks, and "I'll Be Your Love", which was released the following year as the debut single for American-Japanese singer Dahlia and later used as the official theme song of the world's fair, Expo 2005.

In 2003 and 2004, he provided the theme songs "Kimi Dake Dakara" and "Sekai no Owari no Yoru ni" for NHK's 50th anniversary commemorative broadcast and the 90th anniversary of Takarazuka Revue. In 2004, he helped produce the South Korean rock band the TRAX, and his composition "Tears" was used as the theme song for the film Windstruck, becoming the first Japanese song to be featured in a Korean film after World War II. In 2005, a second classical solo album titled Eternal Melody II was released on March 23. The next day, Yoshiki conducted the Super World Orchestra in the opening ceremony of the World's Fair in the performance of a classical version of "I'll Be Your Love." At the end of the same month, a DVD recording of his previous symphonic concert was released. In December, the Violet UK song "Sex and Religion" was released via the iTunes Store, and soon afterwards "Mary Mona Lisa" unofficially via Myspace.

In 2006, Yoshiki appeared at the Otakon convention on August 6, where it was publicly announced that he would be forming a band named S.K.I.N. with rock singer Gackt, soon afterwards they were joined by Sugizo. At the JRock Revolution Festival on May 25, 2007, which was organized by Yoshiki, it was announced that Miyavi was joining. There were high expectations for the band, like to be the first Asian band to conquer the world charts, beginning with America, and to lead a rock revolution and starting a new era of rock and roll, by opening the market for Japanese in the Western music industry. But after their debut performance on June 29, 2007, at the Anime Expo in Long Beach, all activities were stopped.

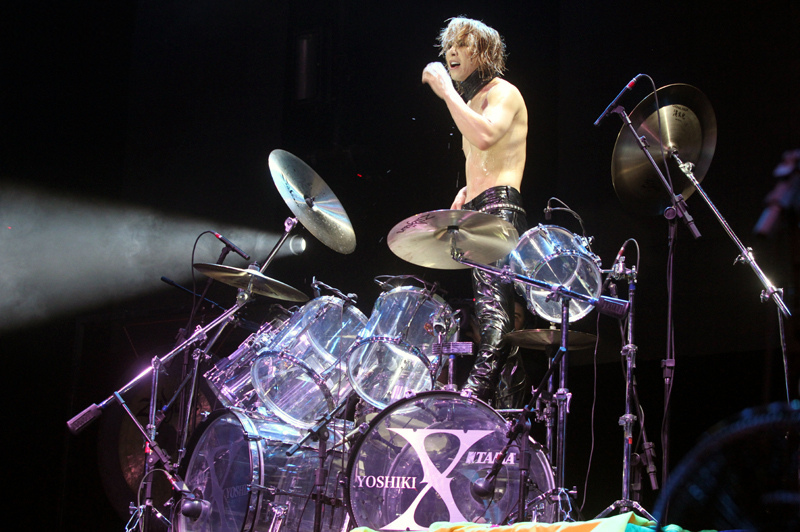
Yoshiki at his drum kit during a 2011 X Japan concert in São Paulo, after the band's reunion in 2007

That same year he co-produced the soundtrack for the 2007 film Catacombs, which included the Violet UK song "Blue Butterfly" and was released by his Extasy Records International. On October 22, 2007, X Japan's living members reunited and appeared together for the first time in over 10 years at a public filming of the promotion video for their new single "I.V.", which was created for the American horror movie Saw IV and played during the end credits but was not included on the soundtrack album. On September 20, 2007, at a Catacombs preview in Japan, it was announced that Yoshiki would be producing the 2008 rock musical Repo! The Genetic Opera and its soundtrack, along with composing one extra track for it. In 2009, he contributed the theme song "Blue Sky Heaven" for the 30th anniversary of a Nippon Television program, and for the Japanese historical fantasy film Goemon he wrote the Violet UK song "Rosa", which was released on April 29 via iTunes. That year he again collaborated with Mugen Motorsports and racing car constructor Dome for the Super GT series championship. In July 2009, he had to undergo surgery for a slipped disc in his neck, and was told by doctors to refrain from heavy drumming. His neck is so severely damaged that Yoshiki's management has said that it, "would force a professional rugby player to retire."

=== 2010–2017: solo career and Yoshiki Classical ===
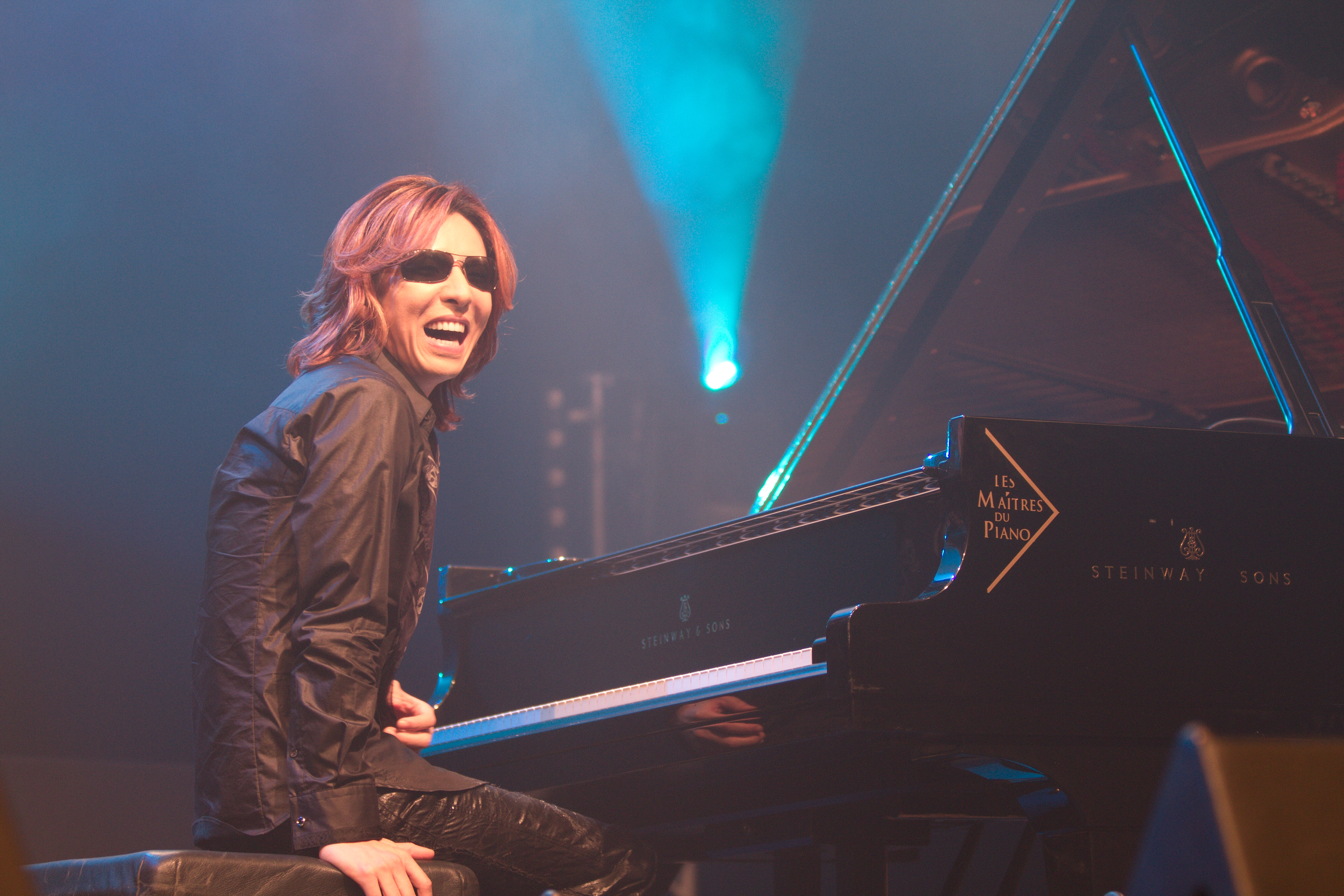
Yoshiki performing at Japan Expo in 2010

In 2010, Yoshiki with Toshi appeared and performed at Japan Expo in Paris on July 4. In October, he fainted in his hotel room on X Japan's tour, and was subsequently diagnosed with hyperthyroidism. He teamed up with Toshi again on January 24–25, 2011, at the first expensive high-end dinner show for their project ToshI feat Yoshiki, where an orchestra was utilized and later a live album released of the show. On March 6, Yoshiki co-organized with fashion producer Jay FR (from the fashion festival "Tokyo Girls Collection") a fashion and music event "Asia Girls Explosion" at Yoyogi National Stadium. At the event many special guest models walked the runway, Yoshiki's own kimono line that he designed, and both X Japan and Violet UK performed. On May 27, "Yoshiki Radio" was launched on SiriusXM's Boneyard station. The hour-long program hosted by Yoshiki, aired the first Sunday of every month. On July 21, at San Diego Comic-Con, Yoshiki unveiled the comic book series Blood Red Dragon, which was created in collaboration with American comic book legends Stan Lee and Todd McFarlane and stars a superhero version of himself.

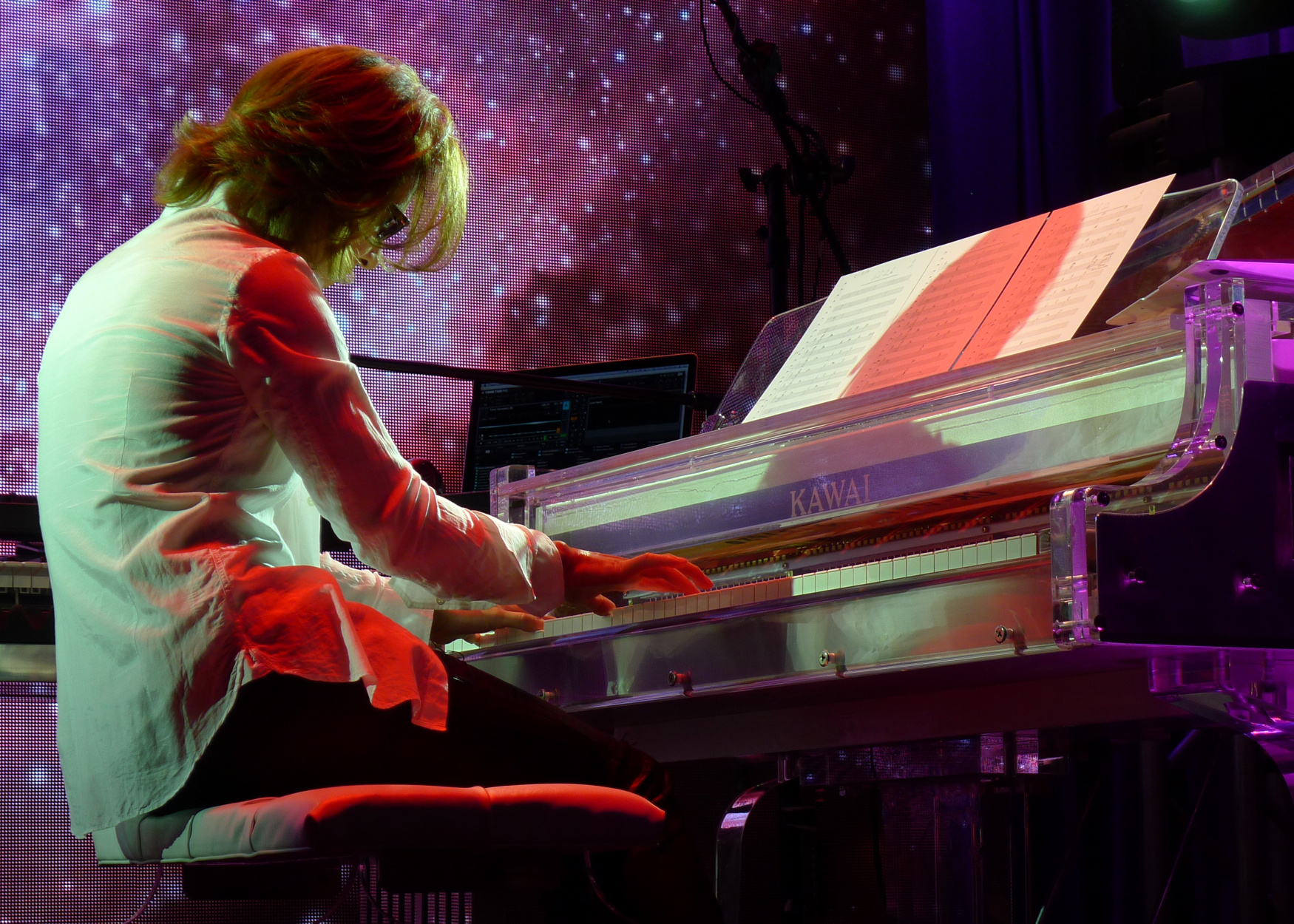
Yoshiki playing the piano at the Grammy Museum in 2013

In 2012, Yoshiki composed the theme song for the 69th Golden Globe Awards, and on January 15, 2013, the theme was officially released through iTunes in 111 countries, with all proceeds being donated to charities chosen by the Hollywood Foreign Press Association. A wax figure of Yoshiki was unveiled at Madame Tussauds Hong Kong wax museum in May 2012. In 2013, Yoshiki's figure was moved to the Tokyo location. On August 27, 2013, the third classical studio album Yoshiki Classical was released. It debuted at No. 1 on the iTunes Classical Music Chart in 10 different countries. In celebration of its release, a special live performance was held at the Grammy Museum.

On March 14, 2014, at the South by Southwest festival in Austin, Texas, Yoshiki performed a duet piano piece during his concert at the Qui Restaurant; one part played by him, and the other played by a hologram of himself. On April 25, Yoshiki started his first classical world tour in Costa Mesa, California, and continued throughout the world, visiting San Francisco, Mexico City, Moscow, Berlin, Paris, London, Shanghai, Beijing, Bangkok, Taipei, Tokyo and Osaka. The tour setup featured Yoshiki on piano, several strings as cellos and viola, and vocalist Katie Fitzgerald from Violet UK. Performances included classical versions of songs he composed, as well depending on the venue, some famous composers like Tchaikovsky. For an upcoming Japanese 3D CG animated film Saint Seiya: Legend of Sanctuary, Yoshiki contributed theme song "Hero" and it was unveiled on the tour. In October 2014, Yoshiki performed a concert at Madison Square Garden with X Japan. It was the group's largest U.S. headlining performance. In November 2014, Yoshiki debuted the official Hello Kitty theme song, "Hello Hello", at the first Hello Kitty Con. He was the guest of honor at Stan Lee's Comikaze Expo.

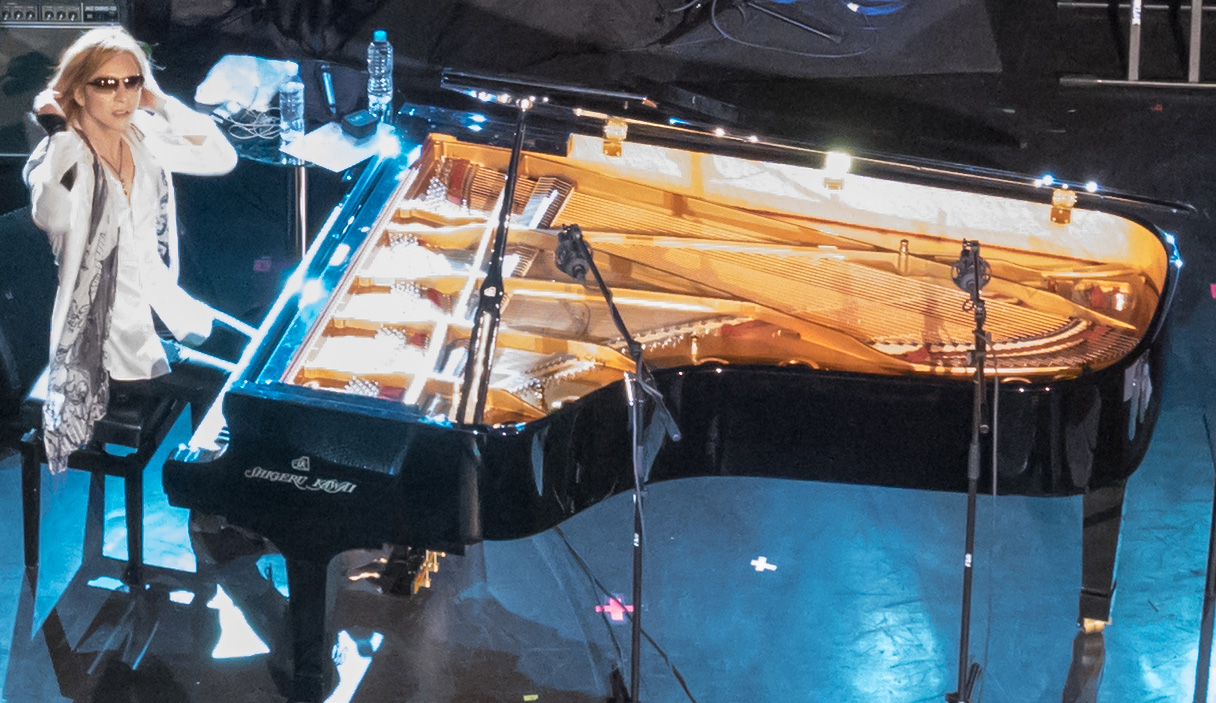
Yoshiki performing in London at the Hyper Japan Festival, 2015

In April 2015, Yoshiki was a guest speaker and performer at the New Economy Summit (NES). In July, he performed at the Hyper Japan Festival in London, together with Toshi. Yoshiki performed with a string quartet at the 2016 Sundance Film Festival. The We Are X film, a documentary on X Japan and Yoshiki, premiered at Sundance and was selected for the World Cinema Documentary Competition. In November 2016, he won the Asian Icon Award at the Classic Rock Roll of Honour Awards in Tokyo. In 2016, he embarked on another classical world tour, with performances in Tokyo and Osaka, and a Hong Kong show that had to be cancelled due to the promoter's mistake and rescheduled as a free concert on December 30.

Yoshiki's second solo classical tour commenced in Osaka Castle Hall on December 5, 2016, with three days at the Tokyo International Forum on December 6, 7 and 8, a performance at Hong Kong's AsiaWorld-Expo scheduled for December 29 and Carnegie Hall, New York on Jan 12 and 13. The Carnegie Hall performances included the Tokyo Philharmonic Orchestra. The Tokyo concerts in December were an acclaimed success but the Hong Kong Concert on December 29 had to be canceled two hours before the show. The cancellation was due to an oversight by the promoter in applying for the entertainment license necessary to perform the show. However the date was fulfilled on the following day, December 30, by Yoshiki performing for free with ticket holders being refunded, the first time for a major music artist to do such a thing in Hong Kong.

=== 2017–2022: "Red Swan", "Miracle", and the Last Rockstars ===
In January 2017, Yoshiki performed two sold-out concerts at Carnegie Hall in New York. In March 2017, Yoshiki performed with a 4-piece string quartet at Hong Kong's Asia Film Awards. In April 2017, Yoshiki debuted a special collaboration T-shirt with rock group Kiss titled "YoshiKiss". During these performances, he lost sensation in his left hand and was rediagnosed with cervical foraminal stenosis. In May 2017, it was announced that Yoshiki would undergo emergency cervical artificial disc replacement surgery in Los Angeles on May 16, resulting in the cancelling of his schedule for May, and future events being possibly cancelled or rescheduled based on discussions after his surgery. The surgery was successful, with his surgical wound expected to take six weeks to heal, and for him to make a 90% recovery in six months. However, the recovery period for the pain in his hand is unknown.

In July 2017, Yoshiki performed six concerts with X Japan. He also performed a series of seven Evening with Yoshiki dinner shows in Osaka, Nagoya, and Tokyo. In October 2017, Yoshiki completed a 10-country tour of Europe promoting the X Japan documentary We Are X.

On July 28, 2018, Yoshiki collaborated with Skrillex for performances of "Endless Rain" and "Scary Monsters And Nice Sprites" at Fuji Rock Festival in Niigata, Japan. On October 3, Yoshiki released the song "Red Swan" featuring Hyde, as the opening theme of the third season of the Attack on Titan anime, reaching #1 on the iTunes rock charts in 10 countries. On November 16, Sarah Brightman's version of Yoshiki's composition "Miracle" hit the top 10 on classical charts in 15 countries, and Yoshiki was announced as a guest performer on Sarah Brightman's Hymn World Tour in 2019 in selected cities in the US and Japan. On New Year's Eve in 2018, he performed in the long-running TV show, Kouhaku Uta Gassen, where, for the first time in the show's history, he was a member of both the Red and the White teams, teaming up with Hyde for a performance of "Red Swan" and then joining Brightman for "Miracle".

In January 2019, it was announced that Yoshiki would partner with the H Collective to compose the score and theme song for the fourth installment of Vin Diesel's xXx film series and create the theme for the animated feature film Spycies. In March 2019, New York-area PBS station WNET Thirteen premiered a one-hour version of his 2017 Carnegie Hall concert. On May 3, 2019, Yoshiki appeared as the featured pianist on Hyde's single "Zipang". The Yoshiki: Live at Carnegie Hall special began airing on PBS stations nationwide in November.

In November 2019, YouTube Originals announced the documentary series Yoshiki - Life Of A Japanese Rock Star would premiere on the streaming platform in March 2020. In December 2019, Yoshiki appeared on stage with Kiss during their End of the Road World Tour, playing piano for "Beth" and drums for "Rock and Roll All Nite" at Tokyo Dome and Kyocera Dome Osaka. They later collaborated for a televised New Year's Eve performance of "Rock and Roll All Nite" under the name "YoshiKiss" on NHK's 70th Kouhaku Uta Gassen.

In January 2020, Yoshiki wrote and produced the debut song "Imitation Rain" for male vocal group SixTones, which launched at number one on the Oricon chart and the Billboard Japan Hot 100 chart, and sold 1.3 million physical copies in its first week.

In March 2020, Yoshiki collaborated with Bono, Will.i.am, and Jennifer Hudson to create "#SING4LIFE", a song written and compiled remotely by the four musicians to lift spirits during the COVID-19 pandemic. In August 2020, St. Vincent and Yoshiki teamed to create a classical arrangement of her song "New York". In September 2020, "Disney - My Music Story: Yoshiki" premiered on the Disney+ service, featuring Yoshiki's new arrangements of themes from Disney films The Lion King and Frozen. In November 2020, Yoshiki's photobook XY with images by American photographer Melanie Pullen, placed number one in the Oricon weekly book chart.

Yoshiki's online concert presented by YouTube Originals titled Under the Sky, with Marilyn Manson, the Chainsmokers, Nicole Scherzinger, Lindsey Stirling, the Scorpions, Hyde, Sugizo, Sarah Brightman, SixTones, and St. Vincent was postponed from its December 2020 premiere due to post-production delays caused by COVID-19. On December 31, 2020, Yoshiki performed a virtual collaboration of X Japan's song "Endless Rain" on Kouhaku Uta Gassen with Roger Taylor and Brian May of Queen, Sarah Brightman, Babymetal, SixTones, Lisa, and Milet. In October 2021, Yoshiki gave a virtual piano performance of "Miracle" for BMW Japan's 40th anniversary event.

In October 2022, Yoshiki and NTV premiered the talent competition show "Yoshiki Superstar Project X", which ranked number 1 in Hulu Japan's domestic variety show category. On November 11, a new supergroup project called the Last Rockstars was announced, featuring Yoshiki, Hyde, Miyavi, and Sugizo. The group released their first single, "The Last Rockstars (Paris Mix)", in December of the same year. In January 2023, the group launched their first international tour with sold-out shows in Tokyo, New York, and Los Angeles.

=== 2023–2024: classical world tours and directorial debut ===
On February 23, 2023, Yoshiki gave the keynote address at Stanford University's conference on "The Future of Social Tech". On May 15, 2023, Yoshiki announced his classical world tour at the Grammy Museum in Los Angeles, titled "Yoshiki Classical 10th Anniversary World Tour with Orchestra 2023 “Requiem". The tour was held in October and included shows at Tokyo Garden Theater, the Royal Albert Hall, Dolby Theatre, and Carnegie Hall. Ellie Goulding and St. Vincent joined Yoshiki on stage at the Royal Albert Hall as guest vocalists, and the concert was broadcast worldwide by On Air and exclusively in Japan by Wowow. He also announced the release of two singles: "Requiem", a classical single dedicated to his mother, and "Angel", X Japan's first single in eight years.

On June 20, the debut single of boy band XY, produced by Yoshiki, was announced on Yoshiki Channel. The song, titled "Crazy Love", written produced, and composed by Yoshiki, was released on June 30. On July 2, Yoshiki appeared at Anime Expo to reveal the cover art for "Requiem" with artist Yoshitaka Amano. On July 15, Yoshiki performed at Japan Expo, joined by XY and French opera singer Séraphine Cotrez.

In July 2023, following Elon Musk's move to rebrand Twitter as "X", it was reported that the Japanese branch of the company, currently called "Twitter Japan", would be rebranded as "X Japan". This led to Yoshiki commenting on Twitter that: "I think it's already trademarked." As a result of the band having the trademark for "X Japan", it was reported that "Twitter Japan" would instead be rebranded "X Nippon" instead. Yoshiki said in an interview with Consequence that he respected Musk and he felt fans should decide the name of the platform. "Angel" was released on July 28.

On August 2, Yoshiki announced the premiere of the feature documentary concert film Yoshiki: Under the Sky, which is the musician's debut as a film director. Premieres in New York, London, and Los Angeles were also announced. The film received positive reviews for its performances, production values, editing, and positive themes from Revolver, Spin, Total Film, and other publications.

On August 4, the Last Rockstars released their second single, "Psycho Love" and announced a tour of the U.S. and Japan for November. On September 14, Yoshiki became the first Japanese artist to be honored with a hand and footprint ceremony at the Chinese Theatre in Hollywood since the tradition began in 1927. He dedicated it to his parents and former X Japan band members Hide and Taiji. On November 14, Yoshiki received the Icon Award at the Stars Asian International Film Festival in Los Angeles.

On January 8. 2024, Sanrio announced that Yoshiki would compose the theme song for Hello Kitty's 50th Anniversary. On March 27, Variety selected Yoshiki as the 2024 International Achievement in Music honoree. On April 16, Yoshiki performed the U.S. National Anthem at Dodger Stadium in Los Angeles. On July 6, the girl group Bi-ray, produced with Yoshiki, made their debut live performance on NTV's "The Music Day" with a preview performance of their first song "Butterfly". On August 1, Yoshiki announced that he would undergo his third neck surgery in October, and that all scheduled musical activities after that would be either postponed or canceled.

On September 17, Yoshiki was a featured presenter at Dreamforce 2024, where he discussed challenges of combining AI, ethics, and creativity with Paula Goldman, EVP at Salesforce and Member of the U.S. Department of Commerce National AI Advisory Committee (NAIAC). In October 2024, Yoshiki and designer/producer Hiroshi Fujiwara released an EP under the project name Bluebyrds.

In October 2024, Yoshiki and NTV began the second season of "Yoshiki Superstar Project X", which opened with controversy due to NTV's handling of the addition of Yuya Tegoshi to XY's lineup. Yoshiki: Under the Sky was released in the U.S. on DVD, Blu-ray, and on-demand digital video by Magnolia Home Entertainment on November 19, 2024. The film began streaming on Amazon Prime Video on February 20, 2025.

=== 2025–present: Time 100, BMG deal, and Josh Groban collaboration ===
On March 18, 2025, Yoshiki performed the U.S. and Japanese national anthems at the MLB Tokyo Series opening ceremony. In April, Time named Yoshiki one of the most influential people of 2025 in their Time 100 list, citing that "Yoshiki has continued to break boundaries—not just as a musician, but also as a cultural ambassador...his influence resonates across the globe." In June, Yoshiki wrote and composed Bi-ray's debut single "Butterfly" as the theme song for the Hollywood film Bride Hard, starring Rebel Wilson. The song reached #1 on the iTunes Pop, Recochoku, and Mora charts in Japan, and the music video, co-directed by Yoshiki, was released on June 20. On September 5, Bi-ray released the "Butterfly - Narrative Version" music video directed by Yoshiki, which featured on-screen appearances by Rebel Wilson, Anna Camp, Colleen Camp, Gigi Zumbado, Da'Vine Joy Randolf, and Yoshiki.

In September 2025, Yoshiki was chosen for the cover of Flaunt magazine's 200th issue, with a feature interview covering his views on streaming music platforms, AI in music, his careers in fashion and wine, and his dedication to performing live. On October 15, Yoshiki presented his conversational AI avatar - "AI Yoshiki" - at Dreamforce 2025 in an interview with Jessica Sibley, CEO of Time. Yoshiki discussed the need for integrity and co-existence between artists and AI, saying "I want the artistic industry and AI to co-exist. AI should not replace the artist. I want to protect the artistic industry as much as I can, and that's why I created AI Yoshiki." In November 2025, Yoshiki was inducted into the Asian Hall of Fame and became the first Japanese artist to be invited to perform at Hegra, the UNESCO World Heritage site in Al-Ula, Saudi Arabia. On December 22, 2025, he was invited to perform onstage with the Jonas Brothers to perform a piano rendition of "Fly With Me".

On February 21, 2026, Yoshiki performed "Endless Rain" on stage with Josh Groban at Bunkamura Orchard Hall in Tokyo, which Groban sang in Japanese. In March, Yoshiki performed a piano and drums arrangement of the Japanese National Anthem at the Formula One Japanese Grand Prix at the Suzuka Circuit. In May, Yoshiki was invited by Diana Ross to perform "If We Hold On Together" live in Tokyo and Osaka during her 2026 Japan live tour. In June, Global Citizen announced Yoshiki as headliner of the organization's first live music event in Tokyo.

On July 16 and 17, 2026, Yoshiki performed two sold-out concerts at Walt Disney Concert Hall, featuring on-stage collaborations with Perry Farrell, Josh Groban, and Jonathan Davis of Korn. Yoshiki created a new orchestral arrangement of Korn's "Freak on a Leash", which he performed on stage with Davis, playing both piano and drums. The back-to-back shows, titled "Scarlet Night" and "Violet Night", were Yoshiki's first full-length U.S. concerts since his 2024 surgery.

On August 28, 2026, Yoshiki released an orchestral live version of "Forever Love" from the Walt Disney Concert Hall performance, featuring Josh Groban singing vocals in both Japanese and English. On August 31, BMG announced it had signed Yoshiki to a global distribution and publishing agreement through his record label, Melodee. On September 15, Yoshiki was invited to return to Dreamforce for the special presentation "Yoshiki's Human Element: AI, Art, and Ethics," discussing the evolving relationship between AI technology and music production. In September, Yoshiki was announced as the first Japanese artist to perform at the Global Citizen Festival in Central Park and was rehearsing to perform "Red Swan" with Guns N' Roses singer Axl Rose. However, the event was cancelled just one day before scheduled due to extreme weather, and Yoshiki issued a statement saying he was heartbroken by the cancellation.

== Legacy ==
=== Influence in Japan ===
Yoshiki has been labeled "the godfather of the visual kei movement". Versailles members Kamijo, Hizaki and Jasmine You have all credited Yoshiki and X Japan as influences, with Kamijo opining, "I think there isn't anyone in the Japanese music business who hasn't been influenced by [X Japan and Luna Sea]." Dir En Grey singer Kyo said, "I wanted to be in a band because of bands like X Japan... so Yoshiki was a big inspiration." Dir En Grey guitarist Kaoru said, "Yoshiki taught us how to evaluate what we make and have passion for what we do." Kisaki cited Yoshiki as his biggest influence. Vocalist Hyde called Yoshiki "one of the representative artists of Japan".

=== Influence on K-Pop ===
Yoshiki is credited as having a major influence on South Korean pop music. As leader of X Japan, he pioneered the visual kei scene and emphasized the glamour and visual style which came to define the K-Pop genre. X Japan's songs "Endless Rain" and "Say Anything" - both written by Yoshiki - became popular in Korea and led to many Korean songwriters and singers copying their musical style.

Yoshiki and X Japan have been cited as influences on Korean pop pioneers like pop star Seo Taiji as important figures of 1990s youth/pop culture in each country. X Japan's "feminine appearance" drew comparisons to shojo manga, which was popular with Korean schoolgirls, and led to over 100 fan clubs in Korea before 1998.

Singer-songwriter Jonghyun (Shinee) links X Japan to his early interest in composing music. JYJ's Kim Jae-joong has also expressed admiration for Yoshiki and X Japan, calling them "legends". Lee Soo-man, founder of SM Entertainment, was an admirer of X Japan and instructed Kim Dong-wan of Shinhwa to dress in X Japan-inspired makeup during the promotion appearances for the group's album T.O.P. in 1999. Kim later performed "Say Anything" at his first solo concert in 2008.

On November 28, 2023, Yoshiki received the MAMA Award for Favorite International Artist and performed "Endless Rain" with Tomorrow x Together's Taehyun and Hueningkai, Boynextdoor's Jaehyun, Riize's Anton, and Zerobaseone's Han Yujin.

== Musical influences ==
When asked what the albums were the most influential for him, Yoshiki named Led Zeppelin IV by Led Zeppelin, Alive! by Kiss, and Killers by Iron Maiden. Yoshiki stated he loved "the punkish elements" of the albums by Iron Maiden and that their work got him interested in punk rock, leading him to focus on bands from the United Kingdom and Japan such as the Exploited, Chaos UK, Discharge, GISM, and Gauze around 1984. He also cited the Sex Pistols, the Clash, and G.B.H. as his favorite bands.

Yoshiki has also named Schubert's "Unfinished" Symphony and Beethoven's 5th Symphony as influences. His favorite classical composers also include J. S. Bach, Schoenberg, Berg, Tchaikovsky, Mozart, Rachmaninoff, and Chopin.

He named John Bonham as his biggest drumming inspiration and cited Cozy Powell as the reason he started to play double bass drums. He also likes Peter Criss, Shuichi Murakami, Jun Aoyama from T-Square, and Minato Masafumi from Dead End. He picked George Winston, Keith Jarrett, Vladimir Horowitz, and Mishiba Satoshi from Kinniku Shōjo Tai as his favorite pianists. The Köln Concert by Keith Jarrett inspired him to learn jazz theory and improvisation. He also studied jazz piano under Dick Marx and Shelly Berg.

== Songwriting and composition ==
Yoshiki composes his songs by hand, writing the score on paper before using instruments or sharing with band members and collaborators. In the 1990s, he experimented with various aliases on songwriting credits, including fictitious names such as Hitomi Shiratori (X Japan's "Tears"), Rei Shiratori (L.O.X.'s "Shake Hand"), and Tomomi Tachibana (Shizuka Kudō's "Shinku no Hana"), in order to separate his rock image from his "softer" works.

He has composed lyrics and music for numerous artists including Glay ("Rain"), Dir en grey, Seiko Matsuda, SixTones, XY, and Bi-ray.

=== Multimedia Projects ===
Yoshiki has composed music and theme songs for various animation, television, and film projects. In 1993, Yoshiki and his band X Japan created the first music video OVA (original video animation) in collaboration with manga collective Clamp and animation studio Madhouse. The X² - Double X project, featuring three songs of motion graphics and a fully-animated music video, was released on VHS and LaserDisc and serves as an origin point for animated music videos featuring musical artists.

Anime / Television / Film - Composed by Yoshiki
Performer	Project Title	Genre	Year	Song Title
X Japan	Zipang	Film	1990	"Endless Rain"
X Japan	Lullaby Keiji	TV Drama	1991	"Say Anything"
X Japan	X² - Double X (with Clamp and Madhouse)	Anime (OVA)	1993	"Silent Jealousy" "Kurenai" "Endless Rain" "X"
X Japan	Nikushimi ni Hohoende	TV Drama	1993	"Tears" "Art of Life"
Yoshiki	Tetteiteki ni Ai wa...	TV Drama	1993	"Amethyst" "Ima wo Dakishimete"
X Japan	X	Anime (Film)	1996	"Forever Love"
Yoshiki	In God's Hands	Film	1998	"Sane"
Yoshiki	Catacombs	Film	2007	Original Score
Violet UK	Repo! The Genetic Opera	Film	2008	"VUK-R"
X Japan	Saw IV	Film	2008	"I.V."
Yoshiki	Tokyo Daikushu	TV Drama	2008	"Aisuru Hito yo" (Masafumi Akikawa) "Untitled"" (Violet UK)
Violet UK	Goemon	Film	2009	"Rosa"
X Japan	Buddha: The Great Departure	Anime (Film)	2011	"Scarlet Love Song"
Yoshiki	Golden Globes	TV Awards Program	2012	"Golden Globe Theme"
Yoshiki	Blood Red Dragon (image song)	Comic Book	2013	"Say Anything"
Yoshiki	Saint Seiya: Legend of Sanctuary	Anime (Film)	2014	"Hero"
Yoshiki	Hello Kitty Theme Song	Character Animation	2014	"Hello, Hello"
X Japan	We Are X	Film	2016	"La Venus"
Yoshiki	Seisei Suruhodo Aishiteru	TV Drama	2016	Bara no youni saite, Sakura no youni chitte (“Bloom like a rose, Fall like a cherry blossom")
Yoshiki feat. Hyde	Attack on Titan	Anime (TV)	2018	"Red Swan"

== Philanthropy ==
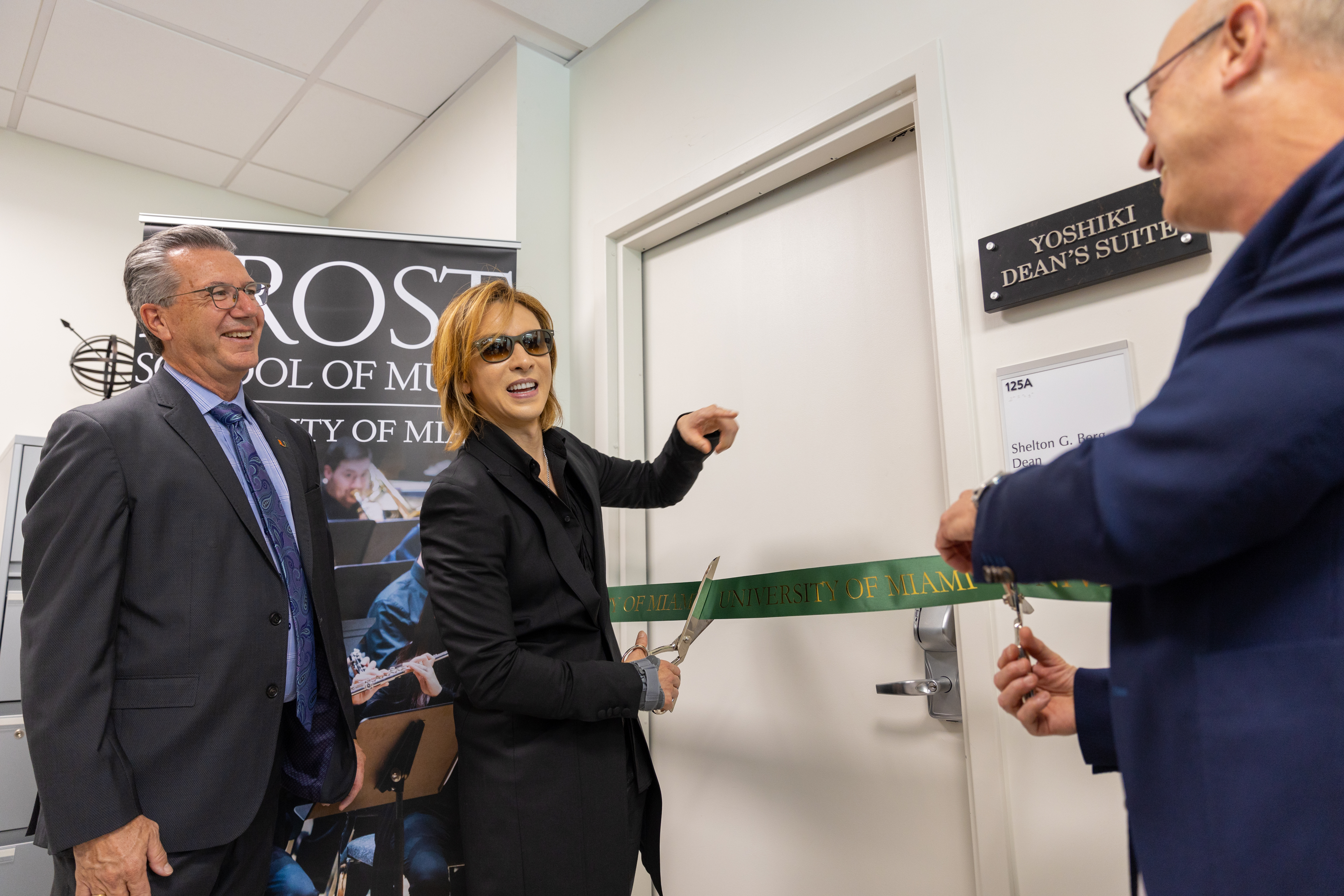
Yoshiki cuts the ribbon outside the newly appointed "Yoshiki Dean's Suite" at the Frost School of Music at the University of Miami in June 2019

=== Yoshiki Foundation America ===
In 2010, Yoshiki founded Yoshiki Foundation America, a California non-profit, public benefit corporation with tax-exempt status as a section 501(c)3. The organization provides support for natural disaster relief and recovery, mental health and suicide prevention, and refugee assistance in the form of emergency relief operations throughout the world.

In 2014, Yoshiki teamed with the Recording Academy in 2014 for a private dinner to raise money for the GRAMMY Foundation. Yoshiki and Yoshiki Foundation America have donated several million dollars to international and U.S. disaster relief, including support of the Amazon Rainforest, Australian bushfire victims, aid to victims of Hurricane Harvey, Hurricane Helene and Hurricane Milton, U.S. COVID-19 relief, the Hualien earthquake in Taiwan, the 2018 Hokkaido Eastern Iburi earthquake, and numerous others.

Through YFA, Yoshiki has supported several charities including the Recording Academy's Musicares foundation, American Red Cross, International Organization for Migration (IOM), Earth Alliance Amazon Forest Fund, Make-A-Wish Foundation, the Australian Red Cross, Rainforest Trust, Japan's National Center for Global Health and Medicine, and St. Vincent Meals on Wheels.

In January 2025, Yoshiki and Yoshiki Foundation America donated $500,000 in support of relief efforts for the 2025 Los Angeles wildfires and announced Yoshiki Foundation America's support for several charity organizations, including MusiCares, World Central Kitchen, Cedars-Sinai Medical Center, American Red Cross, Motion Picture & Television Fund, Hollywood Chamber of Commerce Foundation, and Entertainment Community Fund.

In December 2025, Yoshiki and Yoshiki Foundation America donated $200,000 to support victims of the devastating fire at Wang Fuk Court in Hong Kong and flood victims in Thailand and Indonesia.

In May 2026, Yoshiki donated $100,000 through Yoshiki Foundation America to MusiCares in support of mental health as part of his fight against cyberbullying. In July 2026, Yoshiki and Yoshiki Foundation America donated donated €100,000 to support relief efforts for wildfires in France and Spain and ¥10 million donation to assist communities affected by the earthquake in Kumamoto, Japan. In August 2026, Yoshiki donated 10 million yen to his hometown of Chiba Prefecture to support victims of severe flooding that struck the region.

=== Personal activism ===
Yoshiki started his charitable work as a result of losing his father to suicide at a young age, saying he wanted to support children who have had traumatic experiences like he did.

In 1995, in response to the Kobe earthquake, Yoshiki held X Japan's Christmas Eve charity concert in Osaka, and presented the certifications of new pianos to students whose schools were damaged during the earthquake.

In 2009, he invited 200 young orphans to attend two X Japan's concerts in January in Hong Kong, and donated money to a charity organization for orphans. On March 29 and 31, he visited a town in the province of Sichuan, China, which was devastated by the earthquake in 2008, and donated musical instruments to the schools in the area. He again invited children from the local orphanages in Taipei, Taiwan, to be the special guests in the X Japan's concert on May 30.

In 2011, to provide aid to the victims of March 11's Tōhoku earthquake and tsunami, the Foundation in association with Yahoo! Japan organized the Japan Relief Fundraising Auction, and all the benefits were sent to the Japanese Red Cross. Yoshiki auctioned one of his Kawai Crystal Grand CR-40 pianos, and with restructuring verification system by Yahoo! Auctions, because offers reached high as $20 million, it got sold for $134,931.

In June 2019, Yoshiki visited the Frost School of Music at the University of Miami where he made a $150,000 donation and held a masterclass for students, where he advised the future musicians to "play every concert as if it is your last."

In September 2019, Yoshiki donated 10 million yen to support disaster relief in his hometown of Chiba after it was struck by Typhoon Faxai, and later volunteered for manual labor at the recovery site when he returned to Japan.

In March 2022, Yoshiki helped raise over US$9 million for humanitarian relief efforts in Ukraine after announcing his own donation to the fundraiser initiated by Hiroshi Mikitani, CEO of Rakuten. The same year, Yoshiki continued his support for the people of Ukraine with two donations totaling 20 million yen in November and December to the United Nations agency International Organization for Migration (IOM) for its emergency relief operations in Ukraine and neighboring countries.

In January 2024, Yoshiki donated 10 million yen to the Japanese Red Cross to support areas affected by the Noto Peninsula Earthquake. At the unveiling ceremony for his handprints at the TCL Chinese Theatre on January 9, Yoshiki announced that he would auction his custom Kawai crystal piano to raise more funds for earthquake relief and reconstruction, raising an addition 40 million yen.

In February 2025, Yoshiki volunteered with World Central Kitchen to serve meals to disaster victims following the Los Angeles wildfires. In April 2025, the Los Angeles Dodgers Foundation auctioned music scores hand-written and autographed by Yoshiki and also signed by Dodgers pitchers Roki Sasaki and Yoshinobu Yamamoto to support wildfire relief in the Palisades and Altadena, California, and Ofunato, Japan.

=== Recognition and awards ===
In December 2019, Yoshiki was named as one of Forbes Asia's 30 Heroes of Philanthropy for his contributions to "disaster relief, orphanages and treatment for children with bone-marrow disease".

In March 2021, the Japanese government awarded Yoshiki the Medal with Dark Blue Ribbon for his charity work through Yoshiki Foundation America.

In April 2026, the Entertainment Community Fund announced it would award Yoshiki with the Medal of Honor for his work supporting artists and the entertainment community.

== Fashion ==
=== Yoshikimono ===
In 2011, Yoshiki debuted Yoshikimono, a line of rock-inspired kimono, at the Asia Girls Explosion fashion event in collaboration with Tokyo Girls Collection. Yoshiki created the fashion brand to pay tribute to his parents who ran a kimono shop when he was growing up. The collection debuted at Tokyo Fashion Week with its first fashion show during the finale of the 2015 Mercedes-Benz Fashion Week in Tokyo, and was invited to open Amazon Fashion Week Tokyo 2017. Yoshikimono opened Tokyo Fashion Week 2020 S/S with the brand's third collection, which featured kimono designed around characters from the anime series Attack on Titan and the comic book series Blood Red Dragon, co-created by Stan Lee.

In February 2020, Yoshikimono was announced as part of the Victoria and Albert Museum's "Kimono: Kyoto to Catwalk" exhibition in London. In June 2020, Yoshikimono was featured in the Tokyo National Museum's "Kimono" historical retrospective. In November 2022, Yoshikimono was featured in the touring version of the V&A's exhibition presented at the Musée du Quai Branly – Jacques Chirac in Paris.

=== Maison Yoshiki Paris ===
On July 4, 2023, Yoshiki announced the establishment of his high-fashion brand Maison Yoshiki Paris. The brand will also produce wine and champagne glasses in collaboration with Baccarat.

In February 2024, Maison Yoshiki Paris debuted at Milan Fashion Week Fall/Winter 2024/25 at Bocconi University as part of the official calendar. The runway show featured an onstage musical performance by Yoshiki (including new songs and a collaboration with Hiroshi Fujiwara) and the production team included fashion stylist Carlyne Cerf de Dudzeele, casting director Maida Gregori Boina, hair stylist Odile Gilbert, and makeup artist Kabuki.

In September 2024, he presented his second collection of Maison Yoshiki Paris at the Pallais de Chaillot during Paris Fashion Week S/S 2025, for which Paris Jackson joined the production as runway model.

In April 2025, The New York Times Style Magazine recognized Yoshiki as an influential figure in the Japanese avant-garde fashion movement alongside designers such as Rei Kawakubo and Yohji Yamamoto. Yoshiki stated his design philosophy challenges social conformity and redefines Western beauty, saying his method of fashion design "couldn’t exist in a nation that wasn’t so deeply conformist that to create something truly original requires something else to push against."

=== Modeling ===
In August 2017, Yoshiki was chosen for the cover of Vogue Japan, as the first Japanese male to do so.

In October 2018, Yoshiki was the featured model for the Yves Saint Laurent YSL Beauty Hotel opening event in Tokyo, participating in a female makeup demonstration applied by Yves Saint Laurent's beauty director Tom Pecheux.

In September 2020, Yoshiki was featured on the cover of fashion magazine Numero Tokyo, and in October 2020, Kodansha announced Yoshiki's fashion photo book XY, shot at the Paramour Estate in Los Angeles.

=== Other brands ===
In October 2021, French fine crystal manufacturer Baccarat debuted a 180th anniversary version of its Harcourt glass at Paris Fashion Week 2022 designed by Yoshiki.

== Business ventures ==
Yoshiki has launched several business ventures, including music recording, entertainment, wine, energy drinks, fashion, finance, and lifestyle products.

In 1986 Yoshiki founded Extasy Records in Japan with money he received from his mother when she sold her business, later established Extasy Japan and Extasy Records International, around 2000. He also founded Japanese record label Platinum Records in April 1992 as an affiliate of PolyGram.

In 1992, Yoshiki purchased One On One Recording, a recording studio complex in North Hollywood from Jim David, renaming it Extasy Recording Studios after his own record label in 1999. He sold the studio in 2012, and it later became 17 Hertz Studio. In April 1998, he bought Brooklyn Recording Studios, which housed the Los Angeles offices of Maverick Records, from owners Madonna and Freddy DeMann. He renamed it One On One South before using it as the headquarters of Extasy Records International. In 2013, Yoshiki bought The Pass, a Los Angeles recording studio previously known as Larrabee East.

On May 15, 2000, Yoshiki invented a method for reproducing mp3 music and holds a patent for compressed music data playback technology.

In 2015, the Yoshiki Channel was launched on Niconico Video, a Japanese video platform. The channel streams exclusive live shows and distributes links for movies and magazines.

Yoshiki also has his own Hello Kitty product line, named Yoshikitty.

Yoshiki has partnered with researchers to investigate music as therapy. Yoshiki also has branded MasterCard and Visa credit cards, and is an investor in Green Lord Motors.

In May 2022, Yoshiki formed a business partnership with Coca-Cola Japan to create the energy drinks "Real Gold X" and "Real Gold Y", themed after Yoshiki's connection to rock music and classical music, respectively.

=== Y by Yoshiki wine ===
In 2009, Yoshiki launched his wine brand "Y by Yoshiki" with California winemaker Michael Mondavi, including varietals Cabernet Sauvignon, Pinot Noir, Chardonnay, and Rosé. The brand, which is served in premium hotels and restaurants, has continually sold out across Japan and is referred to as a "phantom wine" due to its scarcity.

The first two wines, "Y by Yoshiki California Chardonnay 2008" and "Y by Yoshiki California Cabernet Sauvignon 2008" were released in autumn 2009 exclusively in Japan. Yoshiki Chardonnay 'Encore' California 2017" and "Y by Yoshiki Cabernet Sauvignon California 2017" shipped over 100,000 bottles in their initial release. In 2018, Yoshiki created `"Y by Yoshiki California", which he called "smart casual", and released a Rosé wine to the series in 2024.

In May 2025, Yoshiki announced the launch of his first Japan-produced wine in partnership with Takahiko Soga, one of Japan’s most respected winemakers and founder of Domaine Takahiko, to be based at Field of Dreams Winery in Yoichi, Hokkaido. In August 2025, the "Y by Yoshiki x Yoshitomo Nara Collaboration Wine" was announced, featuring Nara's art designs for each bottle, in which Yoshiki intends to fuse "rock and roll, high art and fine wine". The wine will be available in three variations and is set for release in February 2026.

The popularity of Y by Yoshiki led to the creation a subscription service in Japan offering members access to limited edition wines.

Yoshiki is involved in the selection and production of each vintage and is known for his knowledge of wine. He also demonstrated his wine tasting knowledge on Japanese national television.

=== Y by Yoshiki x Champagne Pommery ===
"Y by Yoshiki x Champagne Pommery" is a collaborative champagne project between Yoshiki and the French Champagne house Pommery. Launched in August 2022, the collaboration is the first Champagne released by Pommery in partnership with any musician or celebrity.

The Champagne was initially released exclusively in Japan, selling out immediately and dubbed "the Phantom Champagne" due to its scarcity. In July 2023, Pommery expanded distribution to worldwide markets due to record-setting sales.

==== History ====
Yoshiki and Champagne Pommery began developing their collaboration in 2019. Yoshiki worked with Nathalie Vranken, CEO of Vranken-Pommery Monopole, and Pauline Vranken, CEO of Vranken Pommery America, to develop the approach for the brand, and Yoshiki himself designed the bottle.

Created by Yoshiki and Pommery as a blend of Chardonnay, Pinot Noir, and Pinot Meunier, the project was formally announced on August 30, 2022, at a press conference at the Grand Hyatt Tokyo.

The brand's debut - Y by Yoshiki x Champagne Pommery Brut - was released in Japan on September 1, 2022, and the first lot of 10,000 bottles sold out in less than 24 hours, setting a sales record for Pommery. Ken Moroi, President of Vranken Pommery Japan Co., Ltd., stated that the demand was unprecedented in the history of Pommery House, which dates back to 1836.

The Brut Champagne was released in the UK in October 2023, in connection with Yoshiki's concert at Royal Albert Hall, and later into other European markets at high-end restaurants and hotels.

On November 29, 2023, the brand released Y by Yoshiki x Champagne Pommery Brut Rosé.

== Equipment ==
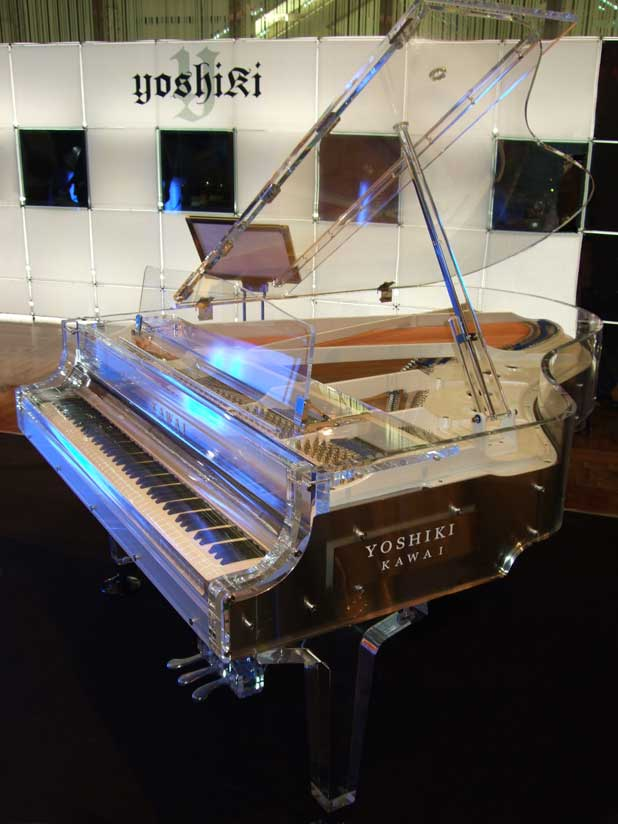
Kawai CR-40A

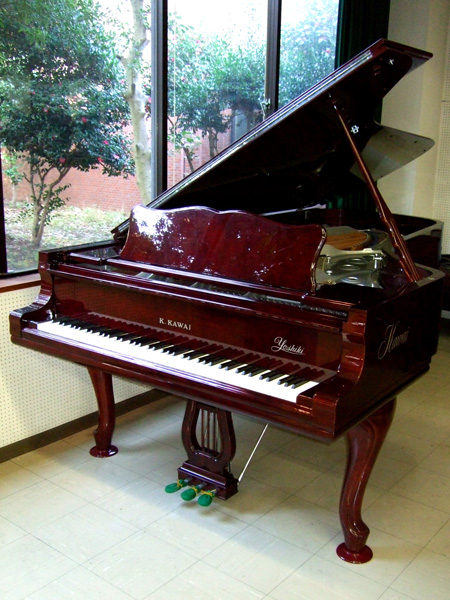
Kawai Yoshiki Custom

Yoshiki said he considers himself a groove drummer. He normally wears a neck brace when playing the drums; as a result of his years of "headbanging" while drumming, he injured his neck and had to undergo surgery. In 2015, Yoshiki stated he is more of a songwriter than a drummer.

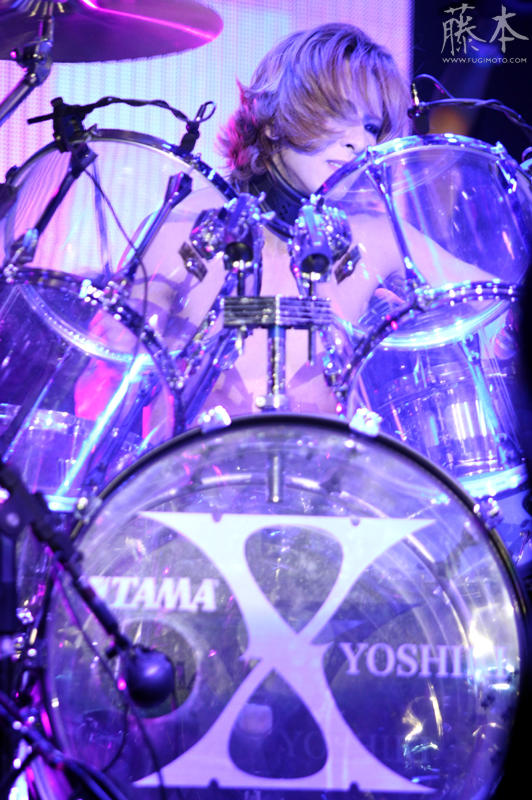
Yoshiki's drum kit up close

Tama Drums created a custom-made acrylic drum set for Yoshiki to use on stage, the ArtStar series. Yoshiki admitted that the clear acrylic shells are great for appearances, allowing the stage lights to color his drums with varying hues, but are not ideal sound-wise. He explained that the clear drums are difficult to play because they do not have the usual responsiveness of wooden shells and are not very durable; as they require much more physical pounding to deliver a good sound and that causes the heads to be essentially ruined after only a single concert. Yoshiki's live kit uses two 24-inch (610 mm) kick drums, and centers the 14" snare drum directly in front of him. He usually works with five tom drums: three rack toms with diameters of 12", 13", and 14", and two floor toms with diameters of 16" and 18". However, in the studio he uses a limited made titanium kit from Kitano drum called Tama Artstar II "Titan Body" with Evans coated heads.

Yoshiki usually performs on a Kawai Crystal II Grand Piano CR-40A. Kawai also makes a Yoshiki-model grand piano of traditional wooden design.

He has a constant numbness of two fingers on his left hand that he says makes it difficult to play piano. He also suffers from chronic tendonitis on his right hand, which may cause him to be unable to play musical instruments in the future.

== Discography ==
Solo studio albums

- Eternal Melody (April 21, 1993)
- Eternal Melody II (March 23, 2005)
- Yoshiki Classical (August 27, 2013)

== Tours and concerts ==
=== Solo tours and appearances ===
- 2002: Symphonic Concert, Tokyo International Forum, Tokyo
- 2014: Yoshiki Classical World Tour Part 1
- 2016: Yoshiki Classical World Tour Part 2
- 2017: Yoshiki Classical Special with Tokyo Philharmonic Orchestra, Carnegie Hall, New York
- 2018: Lunatic Fest
- 2018: Yoshiki Classical ~Two Violet Nights~ YOSHIKI with Philharmonic Orchestra (Tokyo International Forum)
- 2022: Yoshiki Classical with Orchestra 2022 in JAPAN (Tokyo International Forum)
- 2023: Yoshiki Classical 10th Anniversary World Tour with Orchestra 2023 "Requiem" (Tokyo Garden Theater, Royal Albert Hall, Dolby Theatre, Carnegie Hall)
- 2025: Yoshiki - Hegra Candlelit Classics
- 2026: Yoshiki Classical 2026 (Tokyo Garden Theater, Walt Disney Concert Hall)
- 2026: Global Citizen Live: Tokyo (headliner)

=== Dinner show events ===
- Evening with Yoshiki in Tokyo 2014 (August 15–16, 2014)
- Evening with Yoshiki in Tokyo Japan 2015 (August 14–15, 2015)
- Evening with Yoshiki in Osaka and Tokyo Japan 2016 (August 30–31, September 2–3, 2016)
- Evening with Yoshiki 2017 (Nagoya, Osaka, Tokyo) (August 26–27, 29–30, September 1–2, 2017)
- Evening/Breakfast with Yoshiki 2018 in Tokyo 6 Days 5th Anniversary Special (July 13–16, August 31, September 1, 2018)
- Evening/Breakfast with Yoshiki 2019 in Tokyo (August 9–12, 23–25, 2019)
- Evening/Breakfast With Yoshiki 2022 In Tokyo (August 11–15, 19–21, 26–28, 2022)
- Evening/Breakfast With Yoshiki 2023 In Tokyo (August 5–6, 11–13, 19–20, 2023)
- Evening/Breakfast With Yoshiki 2024 In Tokyo (August 2–4, 23–25, 2024)
- Evening/Breakfast With Yoshiki 2025 In Tokyo Kurenai (August 22–24, 29–31, 2025)
- Evening/Breakfast With Yoshiki 2026 In Tokyo 100th Anniversary (August 27–30, 2026)

=== With Sarah Brightman ===
- "Hymn: Sarah Brightman In Concert" - 2019 (New York, Los Angeles, San Francisco, Tokyo (Yokohama), and London)
- "A Starlight Symphony: An Evening with Sarah Brightman" - 2022 (Las Vegas and Mexico)
- "A Christmas Symphony" - 2022 (Japan)

== Awards ==
Year	Award	Category / Description	Nomination	Result
1994	36th Japan Record Awards	Excellence Award	NOA: Ima wo dakishimete (今を抱きしめて)	Won
2013	Billboard Japan Music Awards	Classic Artist of the Year	Yoshiki	Nominated
2016	Classic Rock Roll of Honour Awards	Asian Icon Award	Yoshiki	Won
2021	Medals of Honor Dark Blue Ribbon Award (presented by Government of Japan)	Philanthropy	Yoshiki	Won
2023	MAMA Awards (Mnet)	Favorite International Artist	Yoshiki	Won
2024	Variety International Achievement in Music		Yoshiki	Won
2025	Time100	Most Influential People 2025	Yoshiki	Won
2025	Asian Hall of Fame		Yoshiki	Won
2026	Entertainment Community Fund Medal of Honor	Philanthropy	Yoshiki	Won
2026	Japan America Society of Southern California	International Citizens Award	Yoshiki	Won
2026	America-Japan Society Kaneko Award	Japan-U.S. Relations	Yoshiki	Won
