= Yoshiki Foundation America =

Nonprofit organization founded by Japanese musician Yoshiki

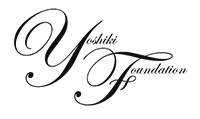
- Formation: 2010
- Founder: Yoshiki (musician)
- Type: Non-profit
- Legal status: 501(c)(3) organization
- Headquarters: Los Angeles, California
- Board of directors: Eric Greenspan; Jeff Mannisto; Jonathan Platt; Yoshiki
- Website: yoshikifoundationamerica.org

Yoshiki Foundation America is an American 501(c)(3) non-profit organization founded in 2010 by Japanese musician Yoshiki, leader of rock bands X Japan and The Last Rockstars. The organization provides support for natural disaster relief and recovery, mental health and suicide prevention, and refugee assistance in the form of emergency relief operations throughout the world.

== History ==
Yoshiki started his charitable work as a result of losing his father to suicide at a young age, saying he wanted to support children who have had traumatic experiences like he did.

In 1995, in response to the Kobe earthquake, Yoshiki held X Japan's Christmas Eve charity concert in Osaka, and presented the certifications of new pianos to students whose schools were damaged during the earthquake.

In 2009, he invited 200 young orphans to attend two X Japan's concerts in January in Hong Kong, and donated money to a charity organization for orphans. On March 29 and 31, he visited a town in the province of Sichuan, China, which was devastated by the earthquake in 2008, and donated musical instruments to the schools in the area. He again invited children from the local orphanages in Taipei, Taiwan, to be the special guests in the X Japan's concert on May 30.

In 2010, he founded Yoshiki Foundation America, a California non-profit, public benefit corporation with tax-exempt status as a section 501(c)3. On July 1, the foundation hosted a free benefit fan event for charity at Club Nokia, Los Angeles. Beneficiaries included the Grammy Foundation, Make-A-Wish Foundation, and St. Vincent Meals on Wheels. In 2011, to provide aid to the victims of March 11's Tōhoku earthquake and tsunami, the Foundation in association with Yahoo! Japan organized the Japan Relief Fundraising Auction, and all the benefits were sent to the Japanese Red Cross. Yoshiki auctioned one of his Kawai Crystal Grand CR-40 pianos, and with restructuring verification system by Yahoo! Auctions, because offers reached high as $20 million, it was sold for $134,931.

In 2014, Yoshiki Foundation America partnered with The Recording Academy for a private fundraising dinner with Yoshiki. The auction awarded the two highest bidders each with a dinner and raised $62,000 for the Grammy Foundation and MusiCares. In 2017, the foundation donated $100,000 to Hurricane Harvey relief efforts through MusiCares. In 2018, YFA donated 10 million yen to assist victims of flooding in Japan, and an additional 10 million yen to assist recovery from the 2018 Hokkaido Eastern Iburi earthquake.

In April 2019, Yoshiki donated $87,900 to Korea for a forest fire accident in Gangwon-do, Korea. In June 2019, Yoshiki visited the Frost School of Music at the University of Miami where he made a $150,000 donation and held a masterclass for students, where he advised the future musicians to "play every concert as if it is your last." Yoshiki's efforts were recognized by the renaming of the Frost School of Music Dean's office as "Yoshiki Dean's Suite".

In August 2019, Yoshiki Foundation America donated 10 million yen to support victims of the Kyoto Animation arson attack, and $100,000 to the Earth Alliance Amazon Forest Fund to prevent destruction of the Amazon Rainforest. In September 2019, the foundation donated 10 million yen to support disaster relief in Yoshiki's hometown of Chiba after it was struck by Typhoon Faxai, and Yoshiki later volunteered for manual labor at the recovery site when he returned to Japan. In October 2019, YFA donated an additional 10 million yen to assist recovery in Japan from Typhoon Hagibis.

In January 2020, Yoshiki Foundation America donated $50,000 to the Australian Red Cross to aid bushfire victims and $50,000 to the Rainforest Trust's Conservation Action Fund. In March 2020, in response to the COVID-19 outbreak, YFA donated $100,000 to the Recording Academy's MusiCares Foundation COVID-19 relief fund, and $24,000 to several Meals on Wheels locations in Southern California. That same month, the musician also donated 10 million yen to the Japan Red Cross in commemoration of the ninth anniversary of the Great East Japan Earthquake. In April 2020, the organization donated 10 million yen to Japan's National Center for Global Health and Medicine.

In March 2021,Yoshiki and MusiCares announced the formation of a $100,000 annual grant to help music creators and industry professionals with programs for depression, anxiety, suicide prevention and awareness, and other mental health concerns. In March 2022, Yoshiki helped raise over US$9 million for humanitarian relief efforts in Ukraine after announcing his own donation to the fundraiser initiated by Hiroshi Mikitani, CEO of Rakuten. The same year, Yoshiki continued his support for the people of Ukraine with two donations totaling 20 million yen in November and December to the United Nations agency International Organization for Migration (IOM) for its emergency relief operations in Ukraine and neighboring countries.

In January 2024, Yoshiki Foundation America donated 10 million yen to the Japanese Red Cross to support areas affected by the Noto Peninsula Earthquake. At the unveiling ceremony for his handprints at the TCL Chinese Theatre on January 9, Yoshiki announced that he would auction his custom Kawai crystal piano to raise more funds for earthquake relief and reconstruction, raising an addition 40 million yen. In April 2024, the organization donated 10 million Yen to the Red Cross to support victims of the Hualien earthquake in Taiwan. In October 2024, YFA donated $100,000 to aid victims of Hurricane Helene and Hurricane Milton.

In January 2025, Yoshiki and Yoshiki Foundation America donated $500,000 in support of relief efforts for the 2025 Los Angeles wildfires and announced Yoshiki Foundation America's support for several charity organizations, including MusiCares, World Central Kitchen, Cedars-Sinai Medical Center, American Red Cross, Motion Picture & Television Fund, Hollywood Chamber of Commerce Foundation, and Entertainment Community Fund.

In December 2025, Yoshiki and Yoshiki Foundation America donated $200,000 to support victims of the Wang Fuk Court fire in Hong Kong and flood victims in Thailand and Indonesia.

In May 2026, MusiCares announced that Yoshiki had donated $100,000 through Yoshiki Foundation America in support of mental health as part of his fight against cyberbullying. In July 2026, Yoshiki and Yoshiki Foundation America donated donated €100,000 to support relief efforts for wildfires in France and Spain and ¥10 million donation to assist communities affected by the earthquake in Kumamoto, Japan. In August 2026, Yoshiki donated 10 million yen to his hometown of Chiba Prefecture to support victims of severe flooding that struck the region.

== Recognition ==
In December 2019, Yoshiki was named as one of Forbes Asia's 30 Heroes of Philanthropy for his contributions to "disaster relief, orphanages and treatment for children with bone-marrow disease".

In March 2021, the Japanese government awarded Yoshiki the Medal with Dark Blue Ribbon for his charity work through Yoshiki Foundation America.

In April 2026, the Entertainment Community Fund announced it would award Yoshiki with the Medal of Honor for his work supporting artists and the entertainment community.

== Philosophy ==
When interviewed for Variety's 2024 International Achievement in Music Award, Yoshiki explained, "I lost my father when I was young. He actually took his own life. I was 10 years old, and since then, I have always wondered, why do people live? The reason I do charitable work is because I want to give it back."

Yoshiki told Forbes about his concern for the welfare of his fans: "I became a rock star because the fans supported me so without fans, I am nothing." About his charitable efforts, Yoshiki said, "I just want to help people, but at the same time, helping people, the act, helps you. When they say, ‘thank you for doing this,’ it makes me feel I have a reason to be alive."

In May 2020, Yoshiki explained his charitable activities to The Japan Times: "If you have a certain influence with people, I think it’s better for you to announce it. By doing so, you can provide awareness of the situation, as well as inform people about charitable organizations supporting the cause, and people may get inspired by your actions as well," said Yoshiki. "The goal is to do as much good as we can for others."

Yoshiki regularly announces his donations publicly to spread awareness and encourage financial support from others. "In Japan, I rarely speak about it because sometimes when you donate, they say, 'Don’t announce it.' I say, 'Why?' By announcing it, people find out who actually needs help and from which country or where. They can also join these kinds of charitable work. I understand [the criticism] too, but this is my way of spreading that chain of love."
