= Repo! The Genetic Opera (soundtrack) =

Soundtrack album

Repo! The Genetic Opera: Original Motion Picture Soundtrack

Soundtrack album by Darren Smith & Terrance Zdunich
- Released: September 30, 2008
- Recorded: 2007
- Genres: Rock opera; gothic rock; industrial rock; punk rock; hard rock; opera
- Label: Lionsgate
- Producers: Joseph Bishara; Yoshiki

Darren Smith & Terrance Zdunich chronology
Repo! The Genetic Opera: Pre-Surgery Sampler (2007)	Repo! The Genetic Opera: Original Motion Picture Soundtrack (2008)	Repo! The Genetic Opera: Original Motion Picture Soundtrack (Deluxe Edition) (2009)

Singles from Repo! The Genetic Opera: Original Motion Picture Soundtrack
- 1. "Mark It Up" Released: 2008; 2. "Zydrate Anatomy" Released: 2008; 3. "Seventeen" Released: 2008; 4. "Chase the Morning" Released: 2008

Professional ratings
Review scores
Source	Rating
IGN	link
Dread Central	link
Joblo	link
Fear Zone	link
FilmMusicMag	B link
ShockYa	link

Repo! The Genetic Opera: Original Motion Picture Soundtrack is the soundtrack to the 2008 rock opera of the same name. The entire album is in the form of a rock opera, where every song is part of the same story. The songs do not appear on the album in chronological order.

Due to popular demand, the producers released a deluxe version of the soundtrack in February 2009 with additional tracks that included songs and pieces of the score.

== Standard edition ==
The standard soundtrack is available only through Amazon.com. It is manufactured on demand on CD-R recordable media.

=== Track listing ===
All song music and lyrics composed by Darren Smith and Terrance Zdunich.

No.	Title	Length
1.	"At the Opera Tonight" (performed by Alexa Vega, Sarah Brightman, Anthony Stewart Head, Paris Hilton, Terrance Zdunich, Bill Moseley, Ogre & Paul Sorvino)	2:10
2.	"Crucifixus" (performed by Sarah Brightman)	1:47
3.	"Things You See In a Graveyard" (performed by Paul Sorvino)	3:12
4.	"Infected" (performed by Alexa Vega)	3:28
5.	"Legal Assassin" (performed by Anthony Stewart Head)	3:28
6.	"Bravi!" (performed by Ogre, Bill Moseley, Paul Sorvino, Sarah Brightman & Paris Hilton)	0:53
7.	"21st Century Cure" (performed by Terrance Zdunich)	3:44
8.	"Mark It Up" (performed by Bill Moseley, Ogre & Paris Hilton)	1:52
9.	"Can't Get It Up If the Girl's Breathing?" (performed by Paris Hilton & Terrance Zdunich)	0:35
10.	"Zydrate Anatomy" (performed by Terrance Zdunich, Alexa Vega & Paris Hilton)	3:24
11.	"Thankless Job" (performed by Anthony Stewart Head)	1:41
12.	"Chase the Morning" (performed by Sarah Brightman, Alexa Vega & Nancy Long)	3:04
13.	"Night Surgeon" (performed by Anthony Stewart Head, Paul Sorvino, Bill Moseley & Ogre)	2:29
14.	"Seventeen" (performed by Alexa Vega, guitar by Joan Jett)	1:50
15.	"Gold" (performed by Paul Sorvino)	3:02
16.	"We Started This Op'ra Shit" (performed by Darren Smith, Bill Moseley, Ogre, Paul Sorvino & Poe)	2:45
17.	"Needle Through a Bug" (performed by Terrance Zdunich & Alexa Vega)	1:41
18.	"Chromaggia" (performed by Sarah Brightman)	2:35
19.	"Let the Monster Rise" (performed by Anthony Stewart Head & Alexa Vega)	2:42
20.	"I Didn't Know I'd Love You So Much" (performed by Alexa Vega & Anthony Stewart Head)	2:06
21.	"Genetic Emancipation" (performed by Alexa Vega)	2:14
22.	"Genetic Repo Man" (performed by Terrance Zdunich)	2:59

=== Video singles ===
To get better publicity of the film, the music and film producers released singles in video form on the official website. The videos were clips taken from the film and were released before the film was released.

Video Singles
Year	Title	Lead Performer	Website
2008	Mark It Up	Bill Moseley, Ogre, & Paris Hilton	Official Website
2008	Zydrate Anatomy	Terrance Zdunich, Alexa Vega & Paris Hilton	Official Website
2008	Seventeen	Alexa Vega	Official Website
2008	Chase the Morning	Sarah Brightman & Alexa Vega	Director's MySpace

== Deluxe edition ==
Repo! The Genetic Opera: Original Motion Picture Soundtrack (Deluxe Edition)

Soundtrack album by Darren Smith & Terrance Zdunich
- Released: February 17, 2009
- Recorded: 2007
- Label: Lionsgate
- Producers: Joseph Bishara; Yoshiki

Darren Smith & Terrance Zdunich chronology
Repo! The Genetic Opera: Original Motion Picture Soundtrack (2008)	Repo! The Genetic Opera: Original Motion Picture Soundtrack (Deluxe Edition) (2009)

Repo! The Genetic Opera: Original Motion Picture Soundtrack (Deluxe Edition) is an extended version of the original soundtrack to Repo! The Genetic Opera.

All the tracks from the previous release remain on the deluxe edition in the same order, with the new tracks placed in between some tracks. The only track that appears on both albums that differs is "Zydrate Anatomy", where it is slightly longer on the deluxe edition.

The deluxe edition also contains score tracks. It is only available at selected Hot Topic stores, but not in the online shop.

=== Track listing ===
All song music and lyrics composed by Darren Smith and Terrance Zdunich.

Tracks listed with no performer are score pieces.

No.	Title	Length
1.	"A New World Organ"	0:11
2.	"At the Opera Tonight" (performed by Alexa Vega, Sarah Brightman, Anthony Stewart Head, Paris Hilton, Terrance Zdunich, Bill Moseley, Ogre & Paul Sorvino)	2:10
3.	"Crucifixus" (performed by Sarah Brightman)	1:47
4.	"Things You See In a Graveyard" (performed by Paul Sorvino)	3:12
5.	"A Repo Man's Daughter"	1:06
6.	"Infected" (performed by Alexa Vega)	3:27
7.	"Legal Assassin" (performed by Anthony Stewart Head)	3:28
8.	"Bravi!" (performed by Ogre, Bill Moseley, Paul Sorvino, Sarah Brightman & Paris Hilton)	0:53
9.	"21st Century Cure" (performed by Terrance Zdunich)	3:44
10.	"Lungs and Livers"	0:22
11.	"Mark It Up" (performed by Bill Moseley, Ogre & Paris Hilton)	1:52
12.	"Worthy Heirs?"	0:41
13.	"Can't Get It Up If the Girl's Breathing?" (performed by Paris Hilton & Terrance Zdunich)	0:35
14.	"Zydrate Anatomy" (performed by Terrance Zdunich, Alexa Vega & Paris Hilton)	3:51
15.	"Thankless Job" (performed by Anthony Stewart Head)	1:41
16.	"Before the Escape"	0:15
17.	"Night Surgeon" (performed by Anthony Stewart Head, Paul Sorvino, Bill Moseley & Ogre)	2:39
18.	"Chase the Morning" (performed by Sarah Brightman, Alexa Vega & Nancy Long)	3:04
19.	"Everyone's a Composer" (performed by Sarah Brightman, Alexa Vega & Anthony Stewart Head)	1:15
20.	"Come Back!" (performed by Alexa Vega & Anthony Stewart Head)	0:49
21.	"What Chance Has a 17 Year Old Girl?" (performed by Anthony Stewart Head & Alexa Vega)	0:42
22.	"Seventeen" (performed by Alexa Vega)	1:50
23.	"Happiness Is Not a Warm Scalpel" (performed by Paris Hilton & Paul Sorvino)	1:40
24.	"Gold" (performed by Paul Sorvino)	3:02
25.	"Depraved Heart Murder at Sanitarium Square"	2:50
26.	"Tonight We are Betrayed" (performed by Anthony Stewart Head)	0:44
27.	"We Started This Op'ra Shit" (performed by Darren Smith, Bill Moseley, Ogre, Paul Sorvino & Poe)	2:45
28.	"Rotti's Chapel Sermon" (performed by Paul Sorvino)	0:46
29.	"Needle Through a Bug" (performed by Terrance Zdunich & Alexa Vega)	1:41
30.	"Chromaggia" (performed by Sarah Brightman)	2:35
31.	"Mag's Fall"	0:37
32.	"Piéce de Résistance" (performed by Paul Sorvino)	0:36
33.	"Interrogation Room" (performed by Paul Sorvino)	1:25
34.	"Let the Monster Rise" (performed by Anthony Stewart Head & Alexa Vega)	2:42
35.	"A Ten Second Opera"	0:54
36.	"I Didn't Know I'd Love You So Much" (performed by Alexa Vega & Anthony Stewart Head)	2:06
37.	"Genetic Emancipation" (performed by Alexa Vega)	2:14
38.	"Genetic Repo Man" (performed by Terrance Zdunich)	2:59

=== Track listing in film order ===
Tracks listed as 900+ are deleted scenes.

No.	Title	Length
1.	"Depraved Heart Murder at Sanitarium Square"
2.	"Genetic Repo Man"
3.	"A New World Organ"
4.	"Things You See In a Graveyard"
5.	"21st Century Cure"
6.	"A Repo Man's Daughter"
7.	"Infected"
8.	"Legal Assassin"
9.	"Lungs and Livers"
10.	"Mark It Up"
11.	"Thankless Job"
12.	"Before the Escape"
13.	"Worthy Heirs?"
14.	"Zydrate Anatomy"
15.	"Night Surgeon"
16.	"Chase the Morning"
17.	"Everyone's a Composer"
18.	"Come Back"
19.	"What Chance Has a Seventeen Year Old Girl?"
20.	"Seventeen"
21.	"Happiness Is Not a Warm Scalpel"
22.	"Gold"
23.	"Tonight We are Betrayed"
24.	"At the Opera Tonight"
25.	"We Started This Op'ra Sh*t"
26.	"Interrogation Room"
27.	"Chromaggia"
28.	"Mag's Fall"
29.	"Piéce de Résistance"
30.	"Let the Monster Rise"
31.	"A Ten Second Opera"
32.	"I Didn't Know I'd Love You So Much"
33.	"Genetic Emancipation"
903.	"Crucifixus"
908.	"Bravi!"
913.	"Can't Get It Up If the Girl's Breathing?"
928.	"Rotti's Chapel Sermon"
929.	"Needle Through a Bug"

== Selections from the Premiere Cast ==
A 7-track album entitled Repo! The Genetic Opera: Selections from the Premiere Cast was released on September 27, 2002, over 6 years before the film's release. The soundtrack consists of early versions of the songs used in the film, recorded by Repo! creators Darren Smith, Terrance Zdunich, and the premiere cast of the stage play.

- Curt Wilson as Nathan/Repo Man
- Lateefah Devoe as Blind Mag
- Terrance Zdunich as GraveRobber
- Stephanie Kane as Shilo
- Penny Wei as Heather (Amber Sweet's original name)
1. "Night Surgeon" – Nathan/Repo Man
2. "...But This is Opera!" – Blind Mag, Cyborg chorus
3. "21st Century Cure" – GraveRobber, Shilo
4. "Come Up and Try My New Parts" – Amber
5. "Legal Assassin" – Nathan
6. "Chase the Morning" – Blind Mag, Cyborg chorus
7. "Choice" – Blind Mag, Nathan, Company

== Pre-Surgery Sampler ==
The Pre-Surgery Sampler was released July 24, 2008 at a secret location on the film's official site. Hardcopies were also released at a convention on the same date.

1. "A New World Organ"
2. "At the Opera Tonight" – Shilo, Mag, Nathan, Amber, GraveRobber, Rotti, Luigi, Pavi
3. "Zydrate Anatomy" – GraveRobber, Shilo, Amber, Chorus
4. "Night Surgeon" – Nathan, Rotti, Gen-Terns, Luigi, Pavi
5. "Chase the Morning" – Mag, Shilo, Marni
6. "Seventeen" – Shilo, Chorus
7. "Genetic Emancipation" – Shilo, Chorus

== Personnel ==
Lionsgate:

- President of Music: Jay Faires
- General Manager & EVP, Business Affairs: Lenny Wohl
- Head of Soundtracks and Digital Music: Chris Fagot

Soundtrack:

- Producer: Joseph Bishara & Yoshiki
- Music and Lyrics: Darren Smith and Terrance Zdunich
- Associate Music Producer: Chris Spilfogel
- Score: Darren Smith
- Score Producer and Mixer: Joseph Bishara
- Engineering and Mixing: Chris Spilfogel and Cedrick Courtois
- Assistant Engineering: Zach Kasik
- Additional Engineers: Sean Lacefield, Zach Kasik and Ashburn Miller
- Digital Editor: Sean Lacefield
- Pre-Production Digital Editing: Paul Lani, Danny Sternbaum, and Tim Harkins
- Creative Consultant: Sean E. DeMott
- Lead Music Administrator: Erica Forster
- Music Assistant: Alisa Burket
- Vocal Coaches: Franni Burke, Brent Alan Huffman, Roger Love, Paul Masse and Eric Vetro
- Orchestrations: Jonathan Zalben and Darren Smith
- Italian Translation on "Chromaggia": Elena Tedros and Sara Suminski
- Music Transcriptions: C.J. Deangelus, Jr., Chris Guardino, Rohen Landa, Jonathan Zalben, Lev Zhurbin, MEDIANTMUSIC, LLC. and Darren Smith

== Musicians ==
All listings apply to the Deluxe Edition version of the album.

Drums/percussion

- Mark "Moke" Bistany: Tracks 2, 7, 17, 30 & 36
- Tommy Clufetos: Tracks 6, 9 & 14
- Stephen Perkins: Tracks 3, 8, 9, 11, 13, 15 & 25
- Darren Smith: Tracks 3, 8, 10 & 25
- Ray Luzier: Tracks, 9, 11, 13, 19, 20, 21, 23, 24, 27, 29, 32, 34, 37 & 38
- Ryan Lacey: Track 15
- Shawn "Clown" Crahan (as M. Sean Crahan "Clown"): Track 17
- Pablo Amador: Track 22

Bass:

- Ashburn Miller: Tracks 2, 6, 9 & 17
- Joseph Bishara: Track 4
- Blasko: Tracks 7, 14, 34, 37 & 38
- David J: Tracks 11, 13, 14, 17, 24, 36,
- Darren Smith: Track 10, 12, 8 & 29
- Philip Bynoe: Tracks 19, 20, 23, 27, 29 & 30
- Ross O'Carrol: Track 22
- Sean Lacefield: Track 25

Guitars:

- Daniel Ash: Tracks 2, 4, 6, 9, 11, 14, 17, 26, 29, 34 & 36
- Sean Lacefield: Tracks 2, 4, 6, 9, 20, 25, 34 & 38
- Darren Smith: Tracks 2, 4, 5, 6, 7, 8, 9, 10, 14, 17, 18, 19, 20, 23, 24, 25, 26, 27, 28, 30, 32, 33, 34, 35, 36 & 38
- Brian Young: Tracks 2, 6, 7, 8, 18, 19, 20, 23, 24, 32, 36 & 37
- Cedrick Courtois: Tracks 4, 9, 34 & 38
- Sonny Moore: Tracks 4, 9 & 25
- Richard Patrick: Tracks 4, 14, 17 & 34
- Richard Fortus: Tracks 7 & 27
- Zach Kasik: Track 8
- Ian Smith: Track 22

Piano/keyboard:

- Darren Smith: Tracks 2, 3, 4, 9, 11, 12, 14, 15, 16, 18, 20, 21, 23, 24, 25, 26, 27, 28, 34, 35 & 37
- Saar Hendelman: Tracks 6, 17, 19, 21, 23, 24, 27, 29, 32 & 37
- Aaron Embry: Tracks 20 & 27
- Doron Kochli: Track 30

Violins:

- Jonathan Zalben: Tracks 2, 6, 7, 11, 17, 18, 24, 27, 30, 34 & 36
- Fred Bows: Tracks 5, 18, 25, 31, 34 & 35

Accordions:

- Rami Jaffee: Track 8
- Doron Kochli: Tracks 8 & 24
- Darren Smith: Tracks 12 & 25

Trumpet:

- Darren Smith: Tracks 10 & 15

Saxophones:

- C.J. DeAngelus, Jr.: Tracks 2 & 11

=== Additional vocals ===
Backing vocals: Jacqueline Becker, Alisa Burket, Kate Conklin, Lateefah Devoe, Thomas Dolan, Richard Gould, Branden James, Erik Hart, Nancy Long, Gabriel Wyner, Nina Bergman, Cedrick Courtois, Sean Lacefield, Poe, Aidan Smith, Darren Smith, Chris Spilfogel, Joseph Bishara, Zach Kasik, Sanjay Nagar, Terrance Zdunich, Zakia Green, Thomasina Gross, Shaun Kama, Tracy Mullholland, Pablo Amador, Nic Cohn, Ross O'Carroll, Ian Smith, Brendan James, Curt Wilson, Laura Bosserman, Kristen DeCarlo, Jennifer Farmer, Lola Blanc, Suthi Picotte & Julia Voth

- Foreign Vocals on "A New World Organ": Ai Aota, Alisa Burket, Dapo Torimiro, Erica Forster, Jinny Lee, Alex Mannone, Martijn Terporten & Suthi Picotte
- Vocals on 'Lungs and Livers': Joseph Bishara, Zach Kasik, Sean Lacefield, Darren Smith & Chris Spilfogel
- Vocal Choir on "Worthy Heirs?": Timothy Carr, Nancy Long & Natalie Salins
- Vocals on 'A Ten Second Opera': Nancy Long
- Air Raid Siren voice on "21st Century Cure": Zakia Green
