= Maison Yoshiki Paris =

French enterprise and fashion house

- Maison Yoshiki Paris logo as displayed at Milan Fashion Week FW 2024/25
- Industry: Fashion
- Founded: 2023
- Founder: Yoshiki
- Products: Apparel, Accessories, Shoes, Glassware
- Website: www.maisonyoshikiparis.com

Maison Yoshiki Paris is a luxury fashion brand of ready-to-wear, footwear, accessories, and eyewear created by Yoshiki. The brand was announced in Paris in July 2023 and debuted at Milan Fashion Week in February 2024.

== History ==
Japanese musician and composer Yoshiki's connection to fashion began as a child of parents who were in the kimono business, which led to his creation of his fashion line Yoshikimono in 2011.

On July 4, 2023, Yoshiki announced the establishment of his high-fashion brand Maison Yoshiki Paris, which will produce ready-to-wear apparel for the international market. The brand will also produce wine and champagne glasses in collaboration with French crystal maker Baccarat. Kuki de Salvertes, who has worked with many designers including Vivienne Westwood and Raf Simons, was appointed as the fashion brand's development director.

In February 2024, Maison Yoshiki Paris debuted at Milan Fashion Week Fall/Winter 2024/25 at Bocconi University as part of the official calendar. The runway show featured an onstage musical performance by Yoshiki (including new songs and a collaboration with Hiroshi Fujiwara) and the production team included fashion stylist Carlyne Cerf de Dudzeele, casting director Maida Gregori Boina, hair stylist Odile Gilbert, and makeup artist Kabuki.

In September 2024, he presented his second collection of Maison Yoshiki Paris at the Pallais de Chaillot during Paris Fashion Week S/S 2025, for which Paris Jackson joined the production as runway model.

== Style ==
Yoshiki has stated that he intends for the brand to present genderless designs that can reach a global market while using fabrics locally sourced from France and Italy. "Maison Yoshiki Paris fuses my visions of fashion, design, and lifestyle with glamorous and genderless designs. I design not only the clothes, but the entire production, including the music."

In April 2025, in the New York Times Style Magazine, Yoshiki discussed Maison Yoshiki Paris in connection with the evolution of Japanese avante-garde fashion, saying it "couldn’t exist in a nation that wasn’t so deeply conformist that to create something truly original requires something else to push against."

== Critical response ==
Vogue Magazine praised the "perfect harmony" of "glamour and drama" in Yoshiki's designs, and Women's Wear Daily highlighted "the loud aesthetics core to Yoshiki’s creativity."

New York Magazine's The Cut said the 2024 debut line at Milan Fashion Week had "performance quality", and Rain Magazine called the collection "a beacon of innovation and elegance".

== Selected features ==
- Flanelle, January 2026. "Blue" (photo: Matéo Blancher; style: Jeanne Philippe)
- Elle (US), September 2024. "Tough Love" (photo: Brigitte Niedermair; style: Patti Wilson)
- Genlux Magazine, Fall 2024. "Sole Inspiration" (photo: James Weber; style Mindy Saad)
- Elle (US), August 2024. "One of One: Anok Yai" (photo: Mario Sorrenti; style: Elle fashion director Alex White)
