= Odile Gilbert =

French hairstylist

Odile Gilbert has been described as France's "most celebrated female hairstylist", and is the only woman in that profession to have received the French honor Ordre des Arts et des Lettres. Her career has been based in Paris and New York.

== Biography ==
Born in Brittany, Gilbert started her career in 1975 as first assistant to the famous hairstylist Bruno Pittini, in his salon and studio. Working with Pittini allowed her to meet celebrities and work on fashion shows and advertising photo shoots.

In 1982, she moved to New York and started working for fashion and beauty editorials in famous fashion magazines with well-known photographers such as Richard Avedon, Helmut Newton, Herb Ritts, Irving Penn, Steven Klein, Peter Lindbergh, Jean-Baptiste Mondino and Paolo Roversi, among others.

She styled the hair of models in advertising campaigns for fashion and perfume houses, such as Calvin Klein, Lancôme, Giorgio Armani and Jean-Paul Gaultier. Her best known work was on fashion shows, on which she worked with the designers, in some cases for many years.

In 2000, she opened her own agency in Paris, l'atelier(68), to take care of her career and also represent new talents to the beauty industry. In 2001, she created her hair accessory line, Odile Gilbert Créations. In 2003, she published Her Style, Hair by Odile Gilbert at Steidl/7L Editions (ISBN 3-88243-925-4), prefaced by Karl Lagerfeld. In 2005, Sofia Coppola hired her as stylist for the eponymous main character of her film Marie-Antoinette, played by Kirsten Dunst. In 2006 she received from Renaud Donnedieu de Vabres, the French Minister of Culture and Communications, the honorable insignia of Chevalier des Arts et des Lettres. To date, she is the only female hairstylist with this honour. In 2007, the Costume Institute of the Metropolitan Museum of New York bought for their permanent collection one of the top hats made of natural hair she created for Jean Paul Gaultier's Haute-Couture AW 2006 show.

In February 2024, Gilbert was the hairstylist for the debut of Japanese musician Yoshiki's high-fashion line Maison Yoshiki Paris at Milan Fashion Week.

== Awards ==
- Trophées de la Mode 1997 & 1999
- Vénus de la Mode 1999, 2004 & 2006
- Victoires de la Beauté 2003
- Chevalier des Arts et des Lettres (July 2006)
