= Symphonic Concert 2002 =

Video by Yoshiki
- Released: March 30, 2005
- Recorded: Tokyo, December 3-4, 2002
- Genre: Classical, rock
- Length: 143
- Label: Columbia
- Producer: Yoshiki

Symphonic Concert 2002 is a live concert DVD by Japanese music composer Yoshiki, released on March 30, 2005. The concert took place on December 3 and 4, 2002 at the Tokyo International Forum. This concert is the first solo classical event by Yoshiki. On the concert were performed Yoshiki's classical compositions, performed by the Tokyo City Philharmonic Orchestra, and featuring his solo musical project Violet UK.

== Track listing ==
1. "Say Anything"
2. "Amethyst"
3. "Last Song"
4. "Unnamed Song"
5. "Forever Love"
6. "Longing"
7. "Amethyst with Vocal and Piano"
8. "Seize the Light"
9. "I'll Be Your Love" (featuring Nicole Scherzinger)
10. "Screaming Blue"
11. "Blind Dance"
12. "Anniversary"
13. "Endless Rain"
14. "Tears"

== Personnel ==
Performers

- Piano & Conductor: Yoshiki
- Vocals: Daughter (from Violet UK), Nicole Scherzinger
- DJ: Colleen Lenihan
- Conductor: Konstantin Dmitrievich Krimets, Ikurō Fujiwara
- Orchestra: Tokyo City Philharmonic Orchestra

Producers

- Producer: Yoshiki
- Assistant producer: Miyuki Tezuka
- Executive producers: Yoshiki, Hidemi Morita, Masao Nakajima, Masayasu Masuzawa
- Editor: Motoshi Wakabayashi
- Mixing engineer: Joe Chiccarelli
- Recording engineer: Hideaki Okuhara, Dokk Knight
- Musical director: Ikuro Fujiwara
- Stage director: Masaki Sato
