= Carlyne Cerf de Dudzeele =

French artist

- Born: January 6, 1950 (age 76); Saint-Tropez, France
- Education: Fashion editor, stylist, art director and photographer

Carlyne Cerf de Dudzeele is a noted French stylist, art director and photographer.

== Early life and ancestry ==
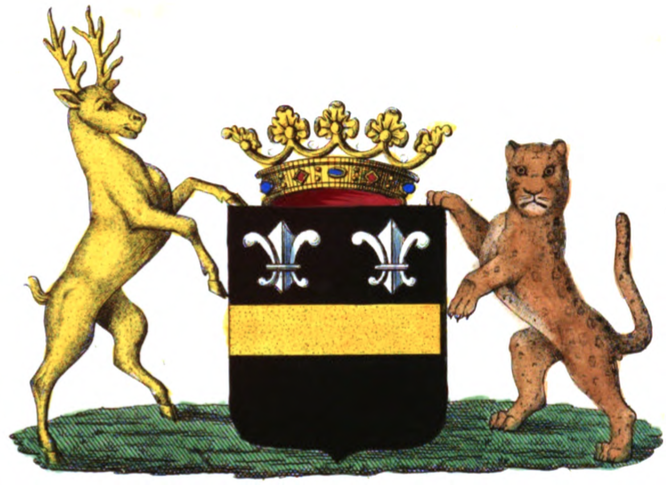
Coat of arms of the Errembault de Dudzeele, Carolyne's maternal family, part of the Belgian nobility.

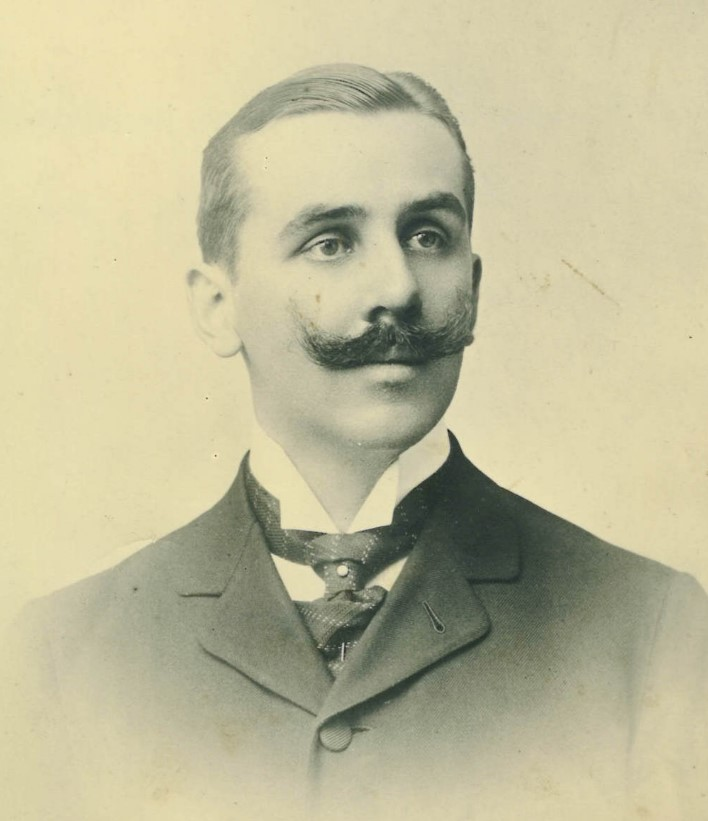
Carlyne's maternal grandfather: Count Gaston Hugues Errembault de Dudzeele (1877-1961), who served as a Belgian diplomat.

Carlyne Cerf de Dudzeele grew up in La Garde-Freinet, near Saint-Tropez, in the south of France, as well as in Paris, where she received a strict education and observed the mix of haute couture with everyday items that was typical of that area. She says that her beautiful childhood memories were thanks to her mother, Anne-Marie Errembault de Dudzeele (1922-1984), member of the Belgian nobility, who was "the most unimaginable woman" she ever knew, married in 1946 to French Corporal Philippe Jean Louis Cerf (1923-1990), her first husband. She has one sister, Géraldine Cerf de Dudzeele who became a clinical psychologist and a half-sister, Marie-Pierre Saville (b. 1959), a lecturer and a designer.

Carlyne's mother, Anne-Marie was the daughter of Count Gaston Hugues Errembault de Dudzeele (1877–1961) and Princess Natalija Petrović-Njegoš, maternal descendant of the House of Obrenović, once ruling family of the Kingdom of Serbia. Through her great-grandmother, Mileva Konstantinović née Opujić (1860–1939), herself a great benefactress and a composer, Carlyne is also a descendant of some of the wealthiest and most prominent families of Triestine Serbs.

== Career ==
Her father made her move to Paris in the 1960s and began her career interning at Depeche Mode and Marie Claire. Later, starting in 1977, she worked at French Elle for 10 years before moving to New York in 1985 and becoming the fashion director of Vogue US, where she styled Anna Wintour's first cover in 1988, in which Israeli model Michaela Bercu was dressed in a Christian LaCroix couture top with a jeweled cross and Guess jeans. She worked closely with prominent fashion photographers of the era: Irving Penn, Richard Avedon, Helmut Newton, Paolo Roversi, Patrick Demarchelier, and her longtime collaborator, Steven Meisel.

Aside from the press industry, the stylist largely defined the Versace look in the 1990s, closely working with Gianni Versace, Azzedine Alaïa, and Karl Lagerfeld upon his arrival at Chanel. De Dudzeele has stated she does not follow trends and says that she always creates her own fashion. To her, simplicity is what defines chic.

De Dudzeele has stated she does not follow trends and says that she always creates her own fashion. To her, simplicity is what defines chic.

In October 2013, de Dudzeele was named editor at large of Lucky Magazine.

In her video series J'Adore, she says that she has loved leopard all her life and that she also loves fake fur because she prefers animals to humans. The last episode of the series was uploaded on 4 June 2014; it was cancelled because she was too busy to continue shooting videos.

In February 2024, de Dudzeele was the chief stylist for the debut of Japanese musician Yoshiki's high fashion line Maison Yoshiki Paris at Milan Fashion Week.

In 2025, Cerf de Dudzeele styled the Victoria’s Secret Fashion Show, working alongside creative director Adam Selman on the collection. She described the collaboration as a process of combining her approach to styling with Selman’s vision for the overall show.
