= Yoshikitty =

Japanese toy and merchandise line

- Created by: Yuko Yamaguchi
- Years: 2009–present

Miscellaneous
- Theme park attraction(s): Sanrio Puroland
- Based on: Yoshiki

Official website
- https://yoshikitty.shop/

Yoshikitty (stylized in all lowercase as yoshikitty) is a Japanese toy and merchandise line created in 2009 as a joint venture between Sanrio and Japanese musician Yoshiki of X Japan. The character was created by Hello Kitty designer Yuko Yamaguchi. The brand specializes in rock-themed and high fashion goods, and was voted more popular than Hello Kitty in the 2018 Sanrio Character Ranking. Yoshikitty is the first Sanrio character modeled after a real-life person.

== History ==
In 2007, Sanrio designer Yuko Yamaguchi approached Yoshiki about writing an official theme song for Hello Kitty, which he premiered at Hello Kitty Con in Los Angeles in 2014. As Yoshiki worked on the song, their conversations inspired Yamaguchi to create an original design merging the character and the musician into "Yoshikitty".

Yoshikitty was revealed in May 2009 at X Japan's concert at Tokyo Dome. In August of the same year, large-scale Yoshikitty balloons were incorporated into the X Japan's stage production. On October 2, 2009, Yoshikitty's second design was revealed at Hello Kitty's 35th Anniversary celebration in Los Angeles.

The documentary film We Are X includes a Blu-ray special feature interview with Yamaguchi about her friendship with Yoshiki and the creation of Yoshikitty. A life-size version of Yoshikitty regularly appears at the Sanrio Puroland theme park and on special television events to play piano or drums.

== Design ==
Yoshikitty's look is modeled closely after Yoshiki, and the character's main features are long blonde hair, purple eyeshadow, and black "rock star" attire. Toys have also been released featuring Yoshikitty wearing Yoshiki's androgynous stage costumes, such as a red and white nurse outfit, a wedding dress, and a "Cinderella" outfit.

== Merchandise ==
Yoshikitty has been the basis for over 500 products, including high fashion clothing, jewelry, and cosmetic items. In 2019, a limited-edition 18k gold Yoshikitty figurine was released in collaboration with precious metal company Ginza Tanaka, with an estimated retail cost of US$10,000.

== International popularity ==
Yoshikitty has been nominated in the international Sanrio Character Ranking for eleven straight years (since 2015). Yoshikitty had been voted more popular than Hello Kitty and won the 3rd prize in the 2018 Sanrio Character Ranking.

In global voting, Yoshikitty has been ranked #1 in Brazil, China, France, Germany, and Thailand.
