= Yoshikimono =

Kimono fashion brand

Yoshikimono is a kimono fashion brand created by Japanese rock musician Yoshiki. After its debut at Asia Girls Explosion in 2011, the brand has been featured as a headliner presentation at Tokyo Fashion Week including the Mercedes-Benz Fashion Week Tokyo 2016, Amazon Fashion Week Tokyo 2017, and Rakuten Fashion Week Tokyo 2020, receiving critical acclaim for its modern approach to Japan's traditional garment.

== History ==
Yoshiki debuted the fashion brand on March 6, 2011, at Asia Girls Explosion at Yoyogi National Stadium in Tokyo. The event was co-produced by Yoshiki and featured Marilyn Manson as a runway model. Yoshiki created the fashion brand to pay tribute to his parents who ran a kimono shop when he was growing up. "I've always adored fashion. If I didn't become a rock star, I would've taken over the family business which made very traditional kimonos. If I break certain rules, it's done with a positive approach. If I desacralize the kimono, it's so that it doesn't fall into oblivion."

On October 17, 2015, Yoshikimono was the closing presentation of Mercedes-Benz Tokyo Fashion Week 2016. One year later, Yoshikimono opened Amazon Fashion Week Tokyo 2017 S/S on October 17, 2016. On October 14, 2019, Yoshikimono was featured as the opening presentation of Rakuten Tokyo Fashion Week 2020 S/S at Shibuya Hikarie.

In January 2020, Marie Kondo wore Yoshikimono for the cover of Numero Tokyo magazine. In February, Yoshikimono was announced as part of the Victoria and Albert Museum's "Kimono: Kyoto to Catwalk" exhibition in London. In June 2020, Yoshikimono was featured in the Tokyo National Museum's "Kimono" historical retrospective. In November 2022, Yoshikimono was featured in the touring version of the V&A's exhibition presented at the Musée du Quai Branly – Jacques Chirac in Paris.

== Critical reception ==
Yoshikimono has received positive reviews based on the brand's non-traditional approach to kimono. Reuters said that Yoshikimono put "a modern twist on the traditional Japanese garment." Vogue Japan highlighted the brand's "gorgeous style" and "rock spirit", and WWD called Yoshikimono's 2020 collection "innovative" and "sexy".

== Theatrical presentation ==
Yoshikimono's presentations are produced with "plenty of drama and a higher production value than is typical" for fashion events. Yoshiki played piano with a model posing erotically on top of his signature glass piano for Mercedes-Benz Tokyo Fashion Week 2016 and performed a drum solo under pouring rain on the runway for Amazon Fashion Week Tokyo 2017. For Rakuten Tokyo Fashion Week S/S 2020, Yoshiki bathed the runway in falling rose petals.

== Pop culture references ==
The Yoshikimono 2020 collection featured kimono patterns with visual elements of the anime series Attack on Titan and the comic book Blood Red Dragon.
