= Hiroshi Fujiwara =

Japanese musician, producer and designer

Hiroshi Fujiwara (藤原ヒロシ, Fujiwara Hiroshi) (born February 7, 1964) is a Japanese musician, producer, and fashion designer.

== Biography ==
Fujiwara was born in Ise, Mie. He moved to Tokyo at eighteen and became a standout in the Harajuku street fashion scene. During a trip to New York City in the early 1980s, he was introduced to hip hop; taking American records back to Tokyo, he became one of Japan's first hip hop DJs, and is credited with popularizing the genre in Japan. He subsequently went into music producing, specializing in remixes.

He is known as a godfather of Ura-Harajuku fashion and is a globally influential streetwear designer, including being the pioneer for Nike's "HTM" line, and the "Fenom" line for Levis. He launched his first brand, Good Enough, in the late 1980s.

Good Enough eventually gave way to a new project: Fragment Design, the brand which Fujiwara dedicates most of his time as a creative to in today's time.

In 2003, he appeared in the film Lost in Translation. As a musician, he has collaborated with many artists, among them are his friends Kahimi Karie, Janis Ian, Ua, and Eric Clapton. In 2003 he designed a guitar for Clapton which was custom made by Martin Guitars for some performances in Japan. After an initial run of eight, Martin built a total of 476 of these ornate black guitars. Another Fujiwara-Clapton guitar followed in 2006.

In 2008, Fujiwara made a rare public appearance in the U.S. and participated in the Imprint Culture Lab's Cult of Collaboration panel.

In February 2024, Fujiwara teamed with musician and composer Yoshiki to create new music for the launch of Yoshiki's high fashion brand Maison Yoshiki Paris at Milan Fashion Week. In October 2024, Fujiwara and Yoshiki released an EP under the project name Bluebyrds.

In September 2025, Fujiwara launched FRGMTmini (pronounced “Fragment Mini”), a global fashion brand focused on children’s and family apparel. The brand applies graphic elements and visual motifs associated with Fujiwara’s work to products designed for younger audiences and families. Since its launch, FRGMTmini has released collections spanning kidswear and family-oriented Pyjamas, and has been publicly noted in coverage of Fujiwara’s broader work in fashion and design. The brand has been stocked by select international retailers, including A Ma Maniére, Dover Street Market Ginza, and JAIDE, among others.

== See also ==
- Nigo
- Japanese street fashion
- Jun Takahashi
- A Bathing Ape
- Visvim
