= Repo! The Genetic Opera =

2008 film by Darren Lynn Bousman

- Theatrical release poster
- Directed by: Darren Lynn Bousman
- Screenplay by: Terrance Zdunich; Darren Smith
- Based on: The Necromerchant's Debt by Terrance Zdunich; Darren Smith
- Produced by: Daniel Jason Heffner; Carl Mazzocone; Oren Koules; Mark Burg
- Starring: Alexa Vega; Anthony Stewart Head; Sarah Brightman; Paris Hilton; Nivek Ogre; Terrance Zdunich; Bill Moseley; Paul Sorvino
- Cinematography: Joseph White
- Edited by: Harvey Rosenstock
- Music by: Darren Smith; Yoshiki
- Production company: Twisted Pictures
- Distributed by: Lionsgate
- Release dates: July 2008 (Fantasia); November 7, 2008 (United States)
- Running time: 98 minutes
- Country: United States
- Language: English
- Budget: $8.5 million
- Box office: $188,126

Repo! The Genetic Opera is a 2008 American musical film. Described as a gothic rock opera, the film was directed by Darren Lynn Bousman and based on the 2002 stage musical of the same name, written and composed by Darren Smith and Terrance Zdunich. It stars Alexa Vega, Anthony Stewart Head, Sarah Brightman, Paris Hilton, Nivek Ogre, Terrance Zdunich, Bill Moseley, and Paul Sorvino.

Repo! premiered at the Fantasia Film Festival in July 2008, followed by a limited release on November 7, 2008, on seven screens in various cities. It received mixed-negative reviews, with primary criticism for its bombastic gore and writing. However, the performances were praised. Similarly to, but not to the same extent as, The Rocky Horror Picture Show, Repo! has achieved cult status and a devoted following.

== Plot ==
By the year 2056, an epidemic of organ failures has devastated the planet and wiped out 99% of the human population. The megacorporation GeneCo provides organ transplants on a payment plan. Clients who miss payments are hunted down by Repo Men, skilled assassins who "repossess" the organs ("Genetic Repo Man"). The CEO of GeneCo, Rotti Largo, discovers he is terminally ill. Rotti's children Luigi, Pavi, and Amber bicker over who will inherit GeneCo ("Mark It Up"), but Rotti believes none of them are worthy heirs and instead plans to give his fortune to 17-year-old Shilo Wallace, the daughter of his late ex-fiancée Marni ("Things You See in a Graveyard").

Shilo has inherited a rare blood disease from Marni that requires her to stay indoors, though she longs to see the outside world ("Infected"). Shilo's domineering father, Nathan, believes he accidentally killed Marni with a treatment he created for her illness – in truth, a jealous Rotti secretly poisoned Marni's medicine and blackmailed Nathan, promising not to arrest him for manslaughter if he agreed to become GeneCo's head Repo Man, though he has convinced Shilo he is a doctor ("Legal Assassin"). One night, Shilo secretly visits Marni's tomb and runs into the omniscient GraveRobber, who is digging up bodies to extract Zydrate, a euphoric and addictive painkiller that he sells on the street to keep up with his GeneCo payments ("21st Century Cure").

Rotti lures Shilo to GeneCo's fair with promises of a cure for her disease. There, she meets Blind Mag, an opera singer and GeneCo's celebrity spokesperson. Born blind, Mag has been given surgically enhanced eyes by GeneCo at the cost of indefinite employment, though she is soon resigning. GraveRobber helps Shilo escape the fairgrounds, encountering several of his customers, including the surgery-addicted Amber ("Zydrate Anatomy"). Shilo learns that Mag's eyes are set for repossession because of her planned resignation and that Amber will replace her as GeneCo's spokeswoman. After GeneCops arrive, Shilo quickly returns to her room before Nathan notices her missing.

Nathan refuses to repossess Mag's eyes, citing her close friendship with Marni ("Night Surgeon"). Infuriated, Rotti vows to have Nathan taken out. Mag visits Shilo, reveals that she is her godmother and that Nathan had told her Shilo died alongside Marni, and cautions Shilo not to make the same mistakes she did ("Chase The Morning"). Nathan arrives and ousts Mag after she scolds him for lying to her and incarcerating Shilo ("Everyone's a Composer"). Shilo begs him to let Mag hide from the Repo Man in their house, but Nathan refuses, leading Shilo to snap and finally condemn her father for his controlling treatment of her and inability to move on from Marni's death ("Seventeen"). Meanwhile, Rotti writes his will, ready to make Shilo his sole beneficiary ("Gold").

Rotti invites Shilo to the Opera, where he swears to cure her blood disease if she helps him nab the Repo Man, not revealing that it's her father. Nathan heads out to find her, pursued by GeneCops, whom he quickly dispatches ("At the Opera Tonight"). Amber makes her stage debut, but her performance is ruined when her transplanted face falls off. Mag completes her final performance, but deviates from the song's grand finale, denouncing the Largo family and gouging out her eyes in an act of defiance ("Chromaggia"). Rotti cuts the cords suspending Mag, impaling her on a fence, but assures the panicking audience that Mag's death was staged as part of the show.

Shilo is used as a trap for the Repo Man. When he approaches a fake Mag tied to a chair, Shilo attacks him with a shovel, revealing him as Nathan, much to her horror ("Let the Monster Rise"). Onstage, Rotti reveals that Nathan has been poisoning Shilo's "medicine" in an attempt to keep her under his control after being unable to cope with the loss of Marni. As his health rapidly declines, Rotti offers Shilo GeneCo if she kills her father. When she refuses, Rotti uses the last of his strength to fatally shoot Nathan, and dies after disowning his children. After a tearful farewell to her father ("I Didn't Know I'd Love You So Much"), Shilo decides that Nathan's actions do not dictate her future ("Genetic Emancipation").

Shilo flees, leaving GeneCo with no legal heir. Amber inherits the company instead and auctions off her fallen face for charity, which Pavi wins after Luigi kills the top three bidders.

== Cast ==
- Alexa Vega as Shilo Wallace
- Paul Sorvino as Rotti Largo
- Anthony Stewart Head as Nathan / Repo Man
- Sarah Brightman as Blind Mag
- Paris Hilton as Amber Sweet
- Bill Moseley as Luigi Largo
- Nivek Ogre as Pavi Largo
- Terrance Zdunich as GraveRobber
- Sarah Power as Marni

Joan Jett makes a cameo appearance playing guitar during the song "Seventeen". Dean Armstrong appears as the victim during "Thankless Job". Co-writer Darren Smith appears during "We Started This Op'ra Shit" as the GeneCo band leader. Frequent Bousman collaborator J. LaRose appears during "Zydrate Support Network" as a GeneCo spokesman.

== Music ==
The film's soundtrack was produced by Yoshiki from X Japan.

The Original Motion Picture Soundtrack was released September 30, 2008.

In the film, the following songs are performed:

1. "Genetic Repo Man" – GraveRobber
2. "Things You See in a Graveyard" – Rotti
3. "21st Century Cure" – GraveRobber, Shilo
4. "Shilo Wakes" – Nathan, Shilo
5. "Infected" – Shilo
6. "Legal Assassin" – Nathan, Ghostly chorus
7. "Lungs and Livers" – GeneCo Chorus
8. "Mark It Up" – Genterns, Amber, Luigi, Pavi
9. "Tao of Mag" – Mag
10. "Things You See in a Graveyard" (reprise) – Rotti
11. "Limo Ride" – Rotti and Shilo
12. "Thankless Job" – Nathan
13. "Tao of Mag" (reprise) – Mag
14. "No Organs? No Problemo!" – GeneCo chorus
15. "Largo's Little Helpers" – Child chorus
16. "Genterns" – Genterns, Pavi
17. "Luigi, Pavi, Amber Harass Mag" – Luigi, Mag, Amber, Pavi, Rotti
18. "Seeing You Stirs Memories" – Rotti
19. "Seeing You Stirs Memories (Reprise)" – Rotti, Mag
20. "My, What Big Scissors You Have" – Shilo
21. "Inopportune Telephone Call" – Nathan, Shilo
22. "GraveRobber and Shilo Escape" – GraveRobber, Shilo
23. "Zydrate Support Network" – Rotti, Reporter
24. "Zydrate Anatomy" – GraveRobber, Shilo, Amber, Zydrate addicts
25. "Disposal Crew" – Disposal crew
26. "Who Ordered Pizza?" – Luigi, Pavi, Nathan, Rotti, Amber
27. "Night Surgeon" – Nathan, Rotti, Henchgirls, Luigi, Pavi, Genterns
28. "Chase the Morning" – Mag, Shilo, Marni
29. "Everyone's a Composer" – Mag, Nathan, Shilo
30. "Come Back!" – Nathan and Shilo
31. "What Chance Has a 17 Year Old Girl" – Nathan, Shilo
32. "Seventeen" – Shilo
33. "Happiness Is Not a Warm Scalpel" – Amber, Rotti
34. "Gold" – Rotti
35. "Nathan Discovers Rotti's Plan" – Nathan, Shilo
36. "Tonight We Are Betrayed" – Nathan
37. "At the Opera Tonight" – Shilo, Mag, Nathan, Amber, GraveRobber, Rotti, Luigi, Pavi
38. "Bloodbath!" – GraveRobber
39. "We Started This Op'ra Shit!" – Bandleader, Luigi, Pavi, Rotti, GeneCo chorus
40. "Interrogation Room Challenge" – Rotti
41. "Blame Not My Cheeks" – Amber, GeneCo chorus
42. "Chromaggia" – Mag
43. "Pièce De Résistance" – Rotti
44. "Let the Monster Rise" – Nathan, Shilo
45. "Sawman's Lament" – Rotti, Luigi, Pavi, Shilo, Nathan
46. "The Man Who Made You Sick" – Rotti, Shilo, Nathan
47. "Cut the Ties" – Rotti, Luigi, Shilo, Pavi
48. "Shilo Turns Against Rotti" – Shilo, Rotti, Nathan
49. "I Didn't Know I'd Love You So Much" – Shilo, Nathan
50. "Genetic Emancipation" – Shilo
51. "Epitaph" – GraveRobber, Zydrate addicts
52. "Repo Man" – Ogre (end credits)
53. "VUK-R" – Violet UK (end credits)
54. "Needle Through a Bug" – Shilo, Graverobber (end credits)
55. "Bravi" – Mag, Pavi, Luigi, Rotti, Amber (end credits)
56. "Aching Hour" – Sarah Brightman (end credits)

=== Score tracks ===
Includes songs only heard as instrumentals and not parts of any deleted songs:

1. "Depraved Heart Murder at Sanitarium Square" (First song heard in the film)
2. "The Prognosis" (Heard right after "Crucifixus")
3. "Nathan's Story" (Heard right after "Infected")
4. "Rotti's Story" (Heard right after "Tao of Mag")
5. "A Ventriloquist's Mess" (Heard right after "Thankless Job")
6. "Blind Mag's Story" (Heard right after "Seeing Your Stirs Memories")
7. "Before the Escape" (Heard right after "Inopportune Telephone Call")
8. "Worthy Heirs?" (Heard right after "Zydrate Support Network")
9. "A Dump Truck Home" (Heard right after "Disposal Crew")
10. "The Visitor" (Heard right after "Night Surgeon")
11. "Pre-Happiness" (Heard right after "Seventeen")
12. "Not Your Parents' Opera" (Heard right after "Bloodbath!")
13. "Mag's Fall" (Heard right after "Chromaggia")
14. "A Ten Second Opera" (Heard right after "Let the Monster Rise")

== Production ==
=== Development ===
In 1996, Darren Smith had a friend going through bankruptcy and whose possessions were going into foreclosure. Inspired by this, Smith came up with the idea of a future where not only one's property, but also one's body parts, could be repossessed. Smith and Terrance Zdunich collaborated on ideas and plotlines to create the first version of Repo!, titled The Necromerchant's Debt, which told the story of a grave robber in debt to a Repo Organ Man. It premiered at the John Raitt Theater in 2002. After being such a success, the duo expanded on the universe to create all of the storylines that became Repo! The Genetic Opera later in 2002. Many changes were made, gradually, to the characters and music throughout various incarnations through 2005. For example, Rotti, in the earliest performances, was not father to Luigi, Pavi and Amber. Instead, he was a younger brother to Luigi and Pavi, while Amber was Luigi's daughter. Lyrics were adjusted to new arcs and some songs were dropped altogether, such as "But This Is Opera!", removed to change the direction of Mag's character.

After years of being performed as a stage play, Repo! was adapted into a ten-minute short film directed and financed by Darren Lynn Bousman to pitch the idea to film studios. The film starred Shawnee Smith as Amber Sweet (then named "Heather Sweet"), Michael Rooker as the Repo Man, Kristen Fairlie as Shilo, Zdunich as GraveRobber and J. Larose as Pavi.

=== Filming ===
Once picked up by Lionsgate, principal photography began in September 2007 in Canada. it was shot primarily at Cinespace Film Studios in Toronto, Ontario, Canada, where the Production for the cult musical film took place between September 10 and October 22, 2007. The film was scheduled for April 25, 2008, but was pushed back to November 7. X Japan leader Yoshiki produced the soundtrack, along with composing one extra track for the film.

== Release ==
=== Theatrical release ===
According to Bousman, the film was nearly released direct-to-video after new leadership at Lionsgate began to doubt the film's commercial prospects following poor test screenings. It received a limited release in the United States and Canada on November 7, 2008. It had a further limited Canadian release, playing in Toronto from November 21–27, 2008. It was released in the Czech Republic on November 20, this was followed by a theatrical release in Spain on January 2, 2009. In December 2008, several more US theatrical screenings were announced, running between January 13–24, 2009, in several cities. The Repo! Road Tour made its 4th and final leg in Europe from March 7–12, 2009.

After initial theatrical release and DVD sales, fan support has caused Repo! The Genetic Opera to be played in select theaters for the duration of 2009 and well into 2014, some with "shadow casts" in which a group of actors and performers re-enact the film in front of the big screen while the film is playing on stage, much like the followers of The Rocky Horror Picture Show. It was re-released in a special screening at the 2010 San Diego Comic-Con.

=== Home media ===
The film was released January 20, 2009 on DVD and Blu-ray in the United States. In Canada, the DVD was released on January 20, 2009, and the Blu-ray was released February 10, 2009. It was released on DVD and Blu-ray in the United Kingdom on March 9, 2009. It was released in Ireland on March 6, 2009. The DVD was released in Germany on April 14. The US DVD release contains two audio commentaries (one by Bousman and actors Vega, Moseley and Ogre; the other by Bousman, creators Smith and Zdunich, and music producer Joseph Bishara), two featurettes and the theatrical trailer. The Blu-ray contains all DVD features including a select-scene audio commentary by Bousman and Hilton, two additional featurettes, a video sing-along with bouncing heart, four deleted scenes and the theatrical trailer.

== Reception ==
=== Critical response ===
On the review aggregator website Rotten Tomatoes, 37% of 60 critics' reviews are positive, with an average rating of 4.7/10. The website's consensus reads: "Bombastic and intentionally gross, Repo! The Genetic Opera has a unique style but lacks the wit and substance to be involving." Metacritic, which uses a weighted average, assigned the film a score of 32 out of 100, based on 15 critics, indicating "generally unfavorable" reviews.

Nathan Lee for The New York Times declared the film "feels destined to please a campy coterie of fans and no one else" and criticized the music, saying, "A few catchy melodies, some clever lyrics or even a sense that the score wasn't just one long, unmodulated track might have energized this singularly inert tale..." Tasha Robinson for The A.V. Club said, "One of the main issues with Repo! The Genetic Opera is that nearly every aspect of it goes on too long. The songs are generally overextended, which is a particular problem given that most of them are also atonal and dull, either chanted or seemingly assembled from a series of clunky, ill-fitting, barely rhyming lines. […] I spent the vast majority of the film either bored or squirming with discomfort over the cheap gore, the arrhythmic songs, and the phenomenally bombastic performances."

=== Box office ===
Repo! grossed $53,684 in its opening weekend, a $6,711 average per theater. The film's full eleven-theater release earned $146,750 in the United States, and an additional $41,376 internationally, for a total of $188,126 worldwide.

=== Accolades ===
Hilton's performance won her the Golden Raspberry Award for Worst Supporting Actress at the 29th Golden Raspberry Awards. The songs "Chase the Morning", "Chromaggia" and "Zydrate Anatomy" were shortlisted for the Academy Award for Best Original Song, although none were nominated.

== See also ==
- Repo Men, a film involving a similar plotline regarding the repossession of transplanted organs
