= The Great Music Experience =

The Great Music Experience was a concert starring Japanese and international musicians staged at the eighth century Buddhist temple of Tōdai-ji, in Nara, Japan in May 1994. The concert, held over three nights (May 20 - May 22) and partly backed by UNESCO, took place in front of the world's largest wooden building, housing the largest Buddha statue in the world.

UNESCO hoped that the event would be the first of seven annual concerts that would take place at some of the world's architectural treasures - the sites it had in mind included the Pyramids, China's Forbidden City and the Taj Mahal - but nothing came of the idea. A concert earmarked for a Mexican pyramid was called off because of the collapse of the peso.

== Description ==
The Tōdai-ji concert brought together Japanese and Western musicians playing music showing the influences of both cultures. The musicians included Bob Dylan, Jon Bon Jovi, Joni Mitchell and INXS. Dylan played in front of the Tokyo New Philharmonic orchestra, the first time he had played with an orchestra.

The priests of Tōdai-ji agreed to stage the concert only after talks lasting several months with British producer Tony Hollingsworth. Shinkai Shindō, the head priest, said that Buddhism aimed to make people happy and that the concert would make the religion more appealing to young people. UNESCO said that it would not have gone ahead if it was not convinced that the site would be respected in a physical, cultural and religious sense.

UNESCO hoped that a series of concerts would be able to use the appeal of rock musicians to widen the audience for the world's cultural heritage. The Tōdai-ji concert would also help to promote traditional Japanese music. It was important for traditional musicians to stand on the same stage with Dylan and Bon Jovi.

Hollingsworth said that his aim was to create a "roller coaster of musical cultures", with Japanese and Western artists playing together after a week of rehearsals. The final night's concert on May 22 was broadcast to 50 countries but, with a breakdown of equipment, a tape recording of the second night was interwoven with the live concert for some of the time. Two documentaries were also broadcast, showing western artists watching Japanese cultural events and rehearsing with Japanese musicians.

The star of the show turned out to be Dylan who said as soon as he came off-stage that he had not sung so well for 15 years. Dylan opened with A Hard Rain's A-Gonna Fall which Q magazine said was "no ordinary version...[he] really opens his lungs and heart and sings, like he's not done for many a year...The only word for it majestic."

Hollingsworth's original idea for the concert was to help overcome western hostility towards Japan caused by the highly successful Japanese economy. The economic bubble, however, had burst by the time the concert took place.

Rights in the event are held by Tribute Inspirations Limited.

== Artists appearing at the event ==
- Bob Dylan
- Cara Butler
- Hasedera Temple Shomyo
- Hiroshi Hori
- INXS
- Ishida
- Jon Bon Jovi
- Joni Mitchell
- Koji Tamaki
- Leonard Eto and His Drummers
- Richie Sambora
- Roger Taylor
- Ry Cooder
- Ryu Hongjun and Tempyo Gafu
- Shoukichi Kina
- The Chieftains
- Tōdai-ji Shōmyō
- Tokyo New Philharmonic Orchestra
- Tomoyasu Hotei
- Toshinori Kondo
- Wayne Shorter
- X Japan
- Yoshiki

=== Backing musicians ===
- Ray Cooper
- Ed Shearmur
- Jim Keltner
- Phil Palmer
- Pino Palladino
- Wix Wickens
