= XY (band) =

Japanese boy band

- Genres: Pop, J-pop
- Years active: 2023–present
- Labels: Avex Trax, Melodee Music
- Members: Jay; Hayato; Raia; Kice; Kanji; P→★; Mitchy; Kosei
- Past members: Gai (vocals); Kairi (guitar); Karma (vocals); Kyohey (drums); Furutatsu (bass); Yuya Tegoshi (vocals)
- Website: x-y.tokyo

XY is a boy band from Tokyo, Japan. Originally consisting of 13 members, the band was formed in 2023 after completing the talent competition show Yoshiki Superstar Project X and is produced by Japanese rock star Yoshiki. The band was originally designed to be a hybrid of a rock band which plays instruments and a dance/vocal group with complex choreography.

== History ==
In February 2022, Nippon TV and Yoshiki announced an international open call for male performers for the music talent competition program Yoshiki Superstar Project X. The program began airing on Hulu Japan in October, featuring the top 20 applicants. Japanese rock star Yoshiki served as the series' producer. The program also featured celebrity guest judges including Gene Simmons, Sarah Brightman, Travis Payne, and Hyde.

While preparing for the band's debut, the 19-year-old lead vocalist, Yoshi, was killed in an accident. After consulting with Yoshi's family, auditions were restarted to find a new vocalist. The song "XY feat. Yoshi" was released on Yoshi's birthday, February 26, 2023, using Yoshi's recorded vocals.

After the new lineup was decided, the band performed their first song, "Crazy Love", on February 28, 2023, on the Nippon TV series Sukkiri accompanied by Yoshiki on piano. On March 4, the band made their first live stage performance at Mynavi Tokyo Girls Collection 2023 Spring/Summer at Yoyogi National Gymnasium. On March 22, the band performed again on the Nippon TV program Premium Music TV.

On June 20, Yoshiki and members of the band appeared on Yoshiki Channel to announce the release of "Crazy Love" as the band's major-label debut single. The song was released on June 30, distributed by Avex Trax in Asia and Melodee Music worldwide. "Crazy Love" went to #1 on the iTunes Alternative Charts in Japan, Hong Kong, and Taiwan, #3 on the iTunes Japan overall chart, and #3 on the Oricon singles chart.

On July 15, members of XY performed on stage with Yoshiki at Japan Expo in Paris, France.

In June 2024, XY released two singles: "YG", performed by the "band" unit, and "Get Stupid", performed by the "dance/vocal" unit. In October, Yoshiki and NTV began the second season of "Yoshiki Superstar Project X", which opened with controversy due to NTV's handling of the addition of Yuya Tegoshi to XY's lineup.

On November 26, 2024, an additional unit consisting of Yuya Tegoshi, Hayato, Jay, Kanji and Raia was announced.

On January 27, 2025, XY released the digital single "Crazy Love (XIV Version)", which re-recorded their first song with new vocals by Tegoshi. The song reached #1 on the iTunes Alternative Chart in Japan.

On January 22, 2024, a new unit, FASHION KILLAS, was announced, consisting of P→★ and Kice. On February 19, 2025, another new unit, T.N.T, was announced, consisting of Yuya Tegoshi, Kairi, Kyohey, Jay and Furutatsu.

On June 13, 2025, it was announced that Gai, Kairi, and Karma would leave the XY project, Furutatsu, Kyohey and Yuya Tegoshi would become independent from XY as T.N.T, and Jay would leave the T.N.T unit to focus exclusively on activities as an XY member.

== Members ==
=== Current ===
- Jay
- Hayato
- Raia
- Kice
- Kanji
- P→★
- Mitchy
- Kosei

=== Former ===
- Gai
- Kairi
- Karma
- Kyohey
- Furutatsu
- Yuya Tegoshi

== Discography ==
=== Singles ===
| Title | Release date | Peak | Album |
|---|---|---|---|
| "XY feat. Yoshi" | February 26, 2023 | | Non-album single |
| "Crazy Love" | June 30, 2023 | #1 iTunes Alternative Singles (Japan, Hong Kong, Taiwan) #3 iTunes Daily Singles #3 Oricon Daily Singles (Japan) | Non-album single |
| "YG" | June 7, 2024 | #1 iTunes Alternative Singles (Japan) #15 Oricon Daily Singles (Japan) | Non-album single |
| "Get Stupid" | June 14, 2024 | #1 iTunes Alternative Singles (Japan) #17 Oricon Daily Singles (Japan) | Non-album single |
| "Crazy Love" | January 27, 2025 | #1 iTunes Alternative Singles (Japan) | Non-album single |
| "Facts" | March 4, 2025 | | Non-album single |
| "Talk" | March 4, 2025 | | Non-album single |
