= Bruno Pittini =

French hairstylist (1945–1995)

- Born: 27 December 1945; Lyon, France
- Died: 9 November 1995 (aged 49); Garches, Île-de-France, France
- Occupation: Hairstylist

Bruno Pittini (27 December 1945 – 9 November 1995) was a French hairstylist.

Pittini met Jacques Dessange in 1964 and worked with him for many years as Dessange's chain of salons grew around the world. He opened the Bruno Dessange salon in New York City in 1984. He left that partnership in 1991, but returned to the company prior to his death.

Pittini was born in Lyon, France in 1945, and cut his sisters' hair from a young age. He became a hairdresser in Paris. He developed his own style of haircutting, and as his fame grew, so did his clientele, which included Brigitte Bardot, and Catherine Deneuve. Other clients included Jodie Foster, Raquel Welch, and Dustin Hoffman. Pittini died in Garches in the western suburbs of Paris on November 9, 1995, at age 49, of complications from pneumonia. Deneuve, as well as his client Donald Sutherland, attended his funeral in Paris.
