= Darren Smith (actor) =

American actor and musician (born 1962)

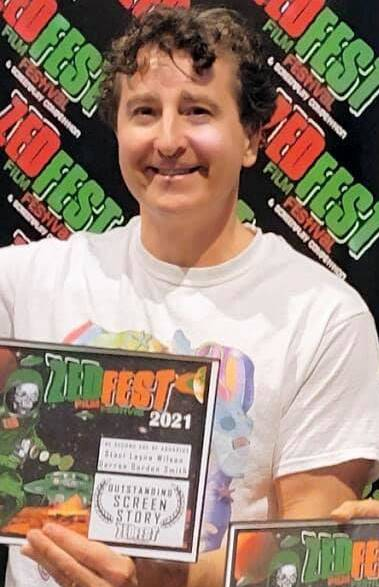
- Born: Darren Gordon Smith; November 20, 1962 (age 62)
- Occupation(s): Actor, writer, composer, musician, producer
- Spouse: Nancy Long
- Website: darrengordonsmith.com

Darren Gordon Smith (born November 20, 1962) is an American musician, composer, and actor. Smith is noted for co-writing and acting in Repo! The Genetic Opera, a rock opera released in 2008.

== Early life and education ==
Smith was born to Gordon Smith, who worked at Lawrence Livermore National Laboratory, and Renee Corey Smith. Smith attended New York University (NYU), where he received a degree in music.

== Career ==
=== Repo! The Genetic Opera ===
In the late 1990s, Smith met Terrance Zdunich in an acting class. The pair would collaborate on 10-minute operas at rock clubs around Los Angeles, where Smith would play many of the instruments and Zdunich would perform many of the acting roles. The pair would expand one of their 10-minute operas, “The Necromerchant’s Debt", into a full-length version of the show titled Repo! The Genetic Opera. According to Zdunich, the plight of one of Smith's friends, who was then undergoing bankruptcy, helped inspire the 10-minute opera.

In 2002, Smith and Zdunich would meet Darren Lynn Bousman, who would later direct Repo!'s cinematic adaptation. The film version of Repo! was released in 2008, and has since attained a cult following. Smith himself has described the film as "Blade Runner meets Rocky Horror".

=== The Second Age of Aquarius ===
In 2022, Smith's collaborative story with Staci Layne Wilson titled 'Phantom/Fandom' was made into a movie called The Second Age of Aquarius. Principal photography for the film began in November 2019. The film debuted at the Zed Fest Film Festival in North Hollywood, Los Angeles.

=== Other projects ===
In 2021, Variety highlighted Smith's literary work featured in ‘Rock & Roll Nightmares: Gory Days’, a horror audiobook.

== Filmography ==
=== Actor ===
- Repo! The Genetic Opera (2008) – Geneco's Band Leader
- Mugworth (2014) – Butcher

=== Writer ===
==== Movies ====
- Repo! The Genetic Opera (2008)
- The Second Age of Aquarius (2022) [with Staci Layne Wilson]

==== Books ====
- Seward's Fall (2015)
- Sex, Death Rock N Roll (2015) [with Staci Layne Wilson]
- Blurt: Verses & Curses (2015)

=== Composer ===
- Repo! The Genetic Opera (2008)
- The Livermores (2011)
- The Night Plays Tricks (2011)
- The Second Age of Aquarius (2022)

=== Producer ===
- Repo! The Genetic Opera (2008)
