= Blood Red Dragon =

Comics series created by Stan Lee and Yoshiki

- Cover of Blood Red Dragon #0

Publication information
- Publisher: Image Comics
- Genre: Epic Fantasy
- Publication date: September 2011 – November 2011
- No. of issues: 4
- Main character(s): Yoshiki; Ky'Rann

Creative team
- Created by: Stan Lee, Todd McFarlane
- Written by: Jon Goff
- Artist: Carlo Soriano

Blood Red Dragon is a 2011 limited epic fantasy comic series based on Japanese rock star Yoshiki, created by Stan Lee and published in 2011 by Image Comics. Todd McFarlane served as the series' creative director. The series was written by Jon Goff with art from Carlo Soriano and Crimelab Syndicate.

== Summary ==
Rock star musician Yoshiki discovers super powers and turns into the Blood Red Dragon. He battles evil forces and assassins in the war with Oblivion, led by the mass murderer Ky'Rann the Slayer. Yoshiki is aided by the beautiful and deadly Shrine Maidens of the Dragon Temple.

== Development ==
Yoshiki and Stan Lee met at a fundraiser in 2009. "He asked me what I do. I said rock star," said Yoshiki. Then Yoshiki asked Lee what he did. He said, "I make superheroes." Yoshiki responded with, "Great, are you going to make me a superhero someday?"

Todd McFarlane joined the project as creative director. When developing Yoshiki's portrayal in the comic, McFarlane said "Yoshiki kind of flaunts his androgynousness. He was quick to point out that he didn’t want to be muscle-bound. When he turns into the dragon character, he didn’t want it to be like the Hulk. He wanted to be lean and mean."

Yoshiki oversaw the project's overall creative direction, and Jon Goff wrote the series's script based on a treatment from Lee. "Stan put together a treatment that established the groundwork for the story. This included a pretty thorough outline for the basic origin of the Blood Red Dragon and the threats he would face, as well as some very specific story beats that served as the foundation for some of the action set pieces. From there, Stan contacted Todd about developing the book further, with the express intent that Todd would help guide the visual sense and presentation of the story."

== Publication history ==
The project was first revealed at San Diego Comic Con in 2011. McFarlane announced that a limited edition run of issues would contain a sound chip to tie in to the music theme of the series. "We're going to be doing a musical comic book, like those musical cards you get at the Hallmark store. There will be a sound chip in the comic book so it plays a riff when you open it. Those are only going to be at Comic-Con."

Yoshiki and Lee appeared at New York Super Week in October 2014, sponsored by New York Comic Con, for a panel about Blood Red Dragon. The event was connected to X Japan's concert at Madison Square Garden that same week.

== Reception ==
Alt Press named Blood Red Dragon in its 2020 list of "13 Comics Books That Would Make Incredible TV Series", saying that the series "simply kicked ass". IGN was disappointed in the simplistic story, claiming "In a book that should be pulsing with the layered complexity of X Japan's precise guitars, crushing drums, and soaring vocals, we get a no-frills story about a scant few mystically-powered heroes as humanity's only hope against an overwhelming evil horde."
