= Noto earthquake =

Noto earthquake

Several earthquakes at or near Noto Peninsula, Japan, have been recorded:

- 1892 Noto earthquake
- 1993 Noto earthquake
- 2007 Noto earthquake
- 2023 Noto earthquake
- 2024 Noto earthquake

== See also ==
- 1693 Sicily earthquake impacting the Italian city of Noto
