= Team endurance at the 2006 World Equestrian Games =

The team endurance competition at the 2006 FEI World Equestrian Games was held on August 21, 2006.

== Medalists ==
Gold	Silver	Bronze
(France) France Virginie Atger (Kangoo d'Aurabelle); Philippe Benoit (Akim du Boulve); Pascale Dietsch (Hifrane du Barthas)	(Switzerland) Switzerland Urs Wenger (Zialka); Anna Lena Wagner (Tessa IV); Nora Wagner (Temir)	(Portugal) Portugal Joao Raposo (Sultão); Ana Margarida Costa (Gozlane du Somail); Ana Barbas (Piperino)

== Complete results ==
=== 3-rider teams ===
	Team	Rider	Horse	Average speed (km/h)	Total time (h:m:s)
1	France	Virginie Atger	Kangoo d'Aurabelle	17.26	9:16:13
1	France	Philippe Benoit	Akim du Boulve	17.01	9:24:30
1	France	Pascale Dietsch	Hifrane du Barthas	16.82	9:30:44
1	France				28:11:27
2	Switzerland	Urs Wenger	Zialka	16.58	9:38:56
2	Switzerland	Anna Lena Wagner	Tessa IV	15.76	10:09:02
2	Switzerland	Nora Wagner	Temir	15.76	10:09:03
2	Switzerland				29:57:01
3	Portugal	Joao Raposo	Sultão	17.01	9:24:31
3	Portugal	Ana Margarida Costa	Gozlane du Somail	16.01	9:59:31
3	Portugal	Ana Barbas	Piperino	14.23	11:14:30
3	Portugal				30:38:32
4	Germany	Sabrina Arnold	Madaq	16.32	9:48:15
4	Germany	Susanne Kaufmann	Fay el Rat	15.20	10:31:37
4	Germany	Belinda Hitzler	Iris de Soult	15.20	10:31:38
4	Germany				30:51:30
5	Netherlands	Jeanne Linneweever-Ribbers	Riki's Macho Man	15.83	10:06:28
5	Netherlands	Jannet van Wijk	Latino	15.05	10:37:52
5	Netherlands	Anita Lamsma	Layla Ara Francina	14.68	10:53:51
5	Netherlands				31:38:11
6	Australia	Margaret Wade	Schuska	15.05	10:37:51
6	Australia	Peter Toft	Electra BBP Murdoch	14.64	10:55:39
6	Australia	Brook Sample	Archduke	14.18	11:17:08
6	Australia				32:50:38
7	Sweden	Jessica Holmberg	Ztefan	14.82	10:47:49
7	Sweden	Liv Burdett	Guld	14.43	11:05:26
7	Sweden	Ingrid Bostrom	Rossini	12.52	12:46:52
7	Sweden				34:40:07
8	Brazil	Mariana Cesarino Steinbruch	Kaoma KG	13.97	11:27:07
8	Brazil	Newton Lins Filho	NNL Sam Ray	13.96	11:27:26
8	Brazil	Pedro Stefani Marino	WN Farah	13.32	12:00:38
8	Brazil				34:55:11
9	South Africa	Cornelius van Niekerk	Ilion du Fier	12.67	12:37:29
9	South Africa	Willa Botland	Japura Dutor	12.26	13:02:55
9	South Africa	Mariaan Liversage	Iris de Saint Agne	12.23	13:04:59
9	South Africa				38:45:23

=== 2-rider teams ===
	Team	Rider	Horse	Average speed (km/h)	Total time (h:m:s)
10	Spain	Miguel Vila Ubach	Hungares	17.38	9:12:27
10	Spain	Jaume Punti Dachs	Elvis HB	17.08	9:22:07
10	Spain				18:34:34
11	Bahrain	Sheikh Duaij bin Salman Al-Khalifa	Shar Rushkin	16.72	9:34:00
11	Bahrain	Nasser bin Hamad Al Khalifa	Ganda Koy	16.00	9:59:50
11	Bahrain				19:33:50
12	United Kingdom	Christine Yeoman	LM Taquillero	15.80	10:07:35
12	United Kingdom	Ann Jobson	Samson	13.95	11:28:13
12	United Kingdom				21:35:48
13	United States	Kathryn Downs	Pygmalion	15.83	10:06:27
13	United States	Jennifer Niehaus	Cheyenne XII	13.38	11:57:26
13	United States				22:03:53
14	Italy	Gianluca Laliscia	Kohl	14.40	11:06:30
14	Italy	Daniela Blasi	Los Angeles Estashadek	13.97	11:27:24
14	Italy				22:33:54
15	Qatar	Abdul Aziz Jassim Al-Buainain	Jibbah Goar	14.38	11:07:39
15	Qatar	Atta Mohammed Peer Mohammed	Duo Park Brolga	13.31	12:01:29
15	Qatar				23:09:08
16	Namibia	Udo von Schauroth	El Encantador	15.44	10:21:48
16	Namibia	Armin van Biljon	Noble Dash XX	12.15	13:09:58
16	Namibia				23:31:46
17	Canada	Ruth Sturley	RBF Super Sport	14.43	11:05:28
17	Canada	Linda Riley	Sir Century	12.23	13:05:01
17	Canada				24:10:29
18	Russia	Akhmed Makhov	Karagjoz	13.48	11:51:57
18	Russia	Aslan Mambetov	Mashuk	12.10	13:13:31
18	Russia				25:05:28
