= Individual endurance at the 2006 World Equestrian Games =

The individual endurance competition at the 2006 FEI World Equestrian Games was held on August 21, 2006.

== Medalists ==
Gold	Silver	Bronze
(Spain) Miguel Vila Ubach (Hungares)	(France) Virginie Atger (Kangoo d'Aurabelle)	(France) Elodie Le Labourier (Sangho’Limousian)

== Complete results ==
=== Finishers ===
	Rider	Horse	Average speed (km/h)	Total time (h:m:s)
1	(Spain) Miguel Vila Ubach	Hungares	17.38	9:12:27
2	(France) Virginie Atger	Kangoo d'Aurabelle	17.26	9:16:13
3	(France) Elodie Le Labourier	Sangho’Limousian	17.26	9:16:14
4	(Spain) Jaume Punti Dachs	Elvis HB	17.08	9:22:07
5	(France) Philippe Benoit	Akim du Boulve	17.01	9:24:30
6	(Portugal) Joao Raposo	Sultão	17.01	9:24:31
7	(Belgium) Valerie Ceuninck	Kouros des Iviers	16.91	9:27:39
8	(France) Pascale Dietsch	Hifrane du Barthas	16.82	9:30:44
9	(Bahrain) Sheikh Duaij bin Salman Al-Khalifa	Shar Rushkin	16.72	9:34:00
10	(Switzerland) Urs Wenger	Zialka	16.58	9:38:56
11	(Germany) Sabrina Arnold	Madaq	16.32	9:48:15
12	(Portugal) Ana Margarida Costa	Gozlane du Somail	16.01	9:59:31
13	(France) Florian Legrand	Imanh	16.01	9:59:32
14	(Bahrain) Nasser bin Hamad Al Khalifa	Ganda Koy	16.00	9:59:50
15	(United States) Kathryn Downs	Pygmalion	15.83	10:06:27
16	(Netherlands) Jeanne Linneweever-Ribbers	Riki's Macho Man	15.83	10:06:28
17	(United Kingdom) Christine Yeoman	LM Taquillero	15.80	10:07:35
18	(Saudi Arabia) Prince Abdullah bin Fahad Al-Saud	Keroc'h	15.77	10:08:34
19	(Switzerland) Anna Lena Wagner	Tessa IV	15.76	10:09:02
20	(Switzerland) Nora Wagner	Temir	15.76	10:09:03
21	(Switzerland) Karin Maiga	Platyn	15.76	10:09:04
22	(United States) Margaret Sleeper	Shyrocco Troilus	15.68	10:12:20
23	(New Zealand) Kylie Avery	Silands Jasark	15.68	10:13:22
24	(Namibia) Udo von Schauroth	El Encantador	15.44	10:21:48
25	(Germany) Susanne Kaufmann	Fay el Rat	15.20	10:31:37
26	(Germany) Belinda Hitzler	Iris de Soult	15.20	10:31:38
27	(Portugal) Rui Pereira	Canário	15.18	10:32:22
28	(Syria) Ahmad Saber Hamcho	Veronica Cap	15.18	10:32:23
29	(Australia) Margaret Wade	Schuska	15.05	10:37:51
30	(Netherlands) Jannet van Wijk	Latino	15.05	10:37:52
31	(Spain) Jose Maria Viar Canales	Hassan al Barbet	14.86	10:45:56
32	(Sweden) Jessica Holmberg	Ztefan	14.82	10:47:49
33	(Denmark) Johanne Hvid	Mon Ami Naverro	14.80	10:48:48
34	(Republic of Ireland) Emer Lennon	Damascus d'Azat	14.68	10:53:50
35	(Netherlands) Anita Lamsma	Layla Ara Francina	14.68	10:53:51
36	(Australia) Peter Toft	Electra BBP Murdoch	14.64	10:55:39
37	(Sweden) Liv Burdett	Guld	14.43	11:05:26
38	(Canada) Ruth Sturley	RBF Super Sport	14.43	11:05:28
39	(Italy) Gianluca Laliscia	Kohl	14.40	11:06:30
40	(Qatar) Abdul Aziz Jassim Al-Buainain	Jibbah Goar	14.38	11:07:39
41	(Portugal) Ana Barbas	Piperino	14.23	11:14:30
42	(Australia) Brook Sample	Archduke	14.18	11:17:08
43	(Brazil) Mariana Cesarino Steinbruch	Kaoma KG	13.97	11:27:07
44	(Italy) Daniela Blasi	Los Angeles Estashadek	13.97	11:27:24
45	(Brazil) Newton Lins Filho	NNL Sam Ray	13.96	11:27:26
46	(United Kingdom) Ann Jobson	Samson	13.95	11:28:13
47	(Australia) Penny Toft	Bremervale Justice	13.65	11:43:11
48	(Russia) Akhmed Makhov	Karagjoz	13.48	11:51:57
49	(United States) Jennifer Niehaus	Cheyenne XII	13.38	11:57:26
50	(Austria) Marguerita Fuller	Kalacsnyikov	13.38	11:57:37
51	(Brazil) Pedro Stefani Marino	WN Farah	13.32	12:00:38
52	(Luxembourg) Valy Schmartz	Haawaa des Graves	13.32	12:00:40
53	(Qatar) Atta Mohammed Peer Mohammed	Duo Park Brolga	13.31	12:01:29
54	(South Africa) Cornelius van Niekerk	Ilion du Fier	12.67	12:37:29
55	(Australia) Jennifer Mary Gilbertson	Harriet	12.52	12:46:51
56	(Sweden) Ingrid Bostrom	Rossini	12.52	12:46:52
57	(Lithuania) Grazina Stugyte	Sok	12.51	12:47:40
58	(Slovakia) Feras Boulbol	Medina	12.33	12:58:42
59	(South Africa) Willa Botland	Japura Dutor	12.26	13:02:55
60	(South Africa) Mariaan Liversage	Iris de Saint Agne	12.23	13:04:59
61	(South Africa) Giliese de Villiers	Shagar	12.23	13:05:00
62	(Canada) Linda Riley	Sir Century	12.23	13:05:01
63	(Jordan) Yara Ihssan Aslan	Mahboub Sultan	12.23	13:05:02
64	(Namibia) Armin van Biljon	Noble Dash XX	12.15	13:09:58
65	(Russia) Aslan Mambetov	Mashuk	12.10	13:13:31

=== Did not finish ===
DNF	Rider	Horse	Gate	Reason
	(Austria) Alexandra Engleder	Mashid	Gate 5	Lame
	(Bahrain) Sheikh Salman bin Saqer Al-Khalifa	Ideal des Vialettes	Gate 5	Medical
	(Bahrain) Yousif Ali Taher	Snowy River Phantom	Gate 5	Eliminated
	(Belgium) Léonard Liesens	Orfeo	Gate 5	Medical
	(Italy) Diana Origgi	Primula Baia	Gate 5	Eliminated
	(Luxembourg) Sarah Sun	Querino de Sier	Gate 5	Eliminated
	(Malaysia) Saari Zulkefli	Cherox Aldaniti	Gate 5	Medical
	(New Zealand) Philip Graham	Wolfgang Amadeus	Gate 5	Lame
	(New Zealand) Howard Harris	Harmere Turfan	Gate 5	Lame
	(Norway) Jan Gutubakken	El Assuan	Gate 5	Eliminated
	(Norway) Camilla Smestad	Aliatar	Gate 5	Lame
	(Slovakia) Feiruz Boulbolova	Fathia	Gate 5	Lame
	(Sweden) Yvonne Ekelund	Amigo el Caballo	Gate 5	Lame
	(United Arab Emirates) Sheikh Rashid bin Mohammed Al Maktoum	Kerval du Breuil	Gate 5	Lame
	(United Kingdom) Tricia Hirst	Vlacq Khamul	Gate 5	Medical
	(United States) Christoph Schork	Taj Rai Hasan	Gate 5	Lame
	(Austria) Susanne Thumer	Galib	Gate 4	Lame
	(Belgium) Jacques Arnould	Higgin du Barthas	Gate 4	Lame
	(Belgium) Karin Boulanger	Poespass	Gate 4	Medical
	(Canada) Mary-Anne Dorchester	SH Rock N' Roll	Gate 4	Lame
	(Czech Republic) Jaromir Siroky	Cezario Manfred	Gate 4	Medical
	(Georgia (country)) Anna Gugunava	Fokstrot	Gate 4	Medical
	(Germany) Marianne Hähnel	Baida In Nahar	Gate 4	Medical
	(Greece) Alexia Steuber-Kolpodinou	Bariq al Amar	Gate 4	Lame
	(Republic of Ireland) Iona Rossely	Auscot Park Astra	Gate 4	Lame
	(Malaysia) Shamsuddin Abd Roni Sulaiman	Malin	Gate 4	Lame
	(Portugal) Filipe Cacheirinha	Papoila	Gate 4	Retired
	(Qatar) Fahad Hamad Al-Athba	Tequila	Gate 4	Lame
	(Russia) Elena Loseva	Vinograd	Gate 4	Lame
	(Saudi Arabia) Prince Saud bin Khalid Al-Saud	Musty de Mirabeau	Gate 4	Eliminated
	(Sweden) Gunilla Carlson	Marzinett	Gate 4	Medical
	(Syria) Tarek Arnaout	Pieskal	Gate 4	Lame
	(United Arab Emirates) Sheikh Ahmed bin Mohd Al-Maktoum	Jazyk	Gate 4	Medical
	(United Kingdom) Linda Hams	HS Hidden Challenge	Gate 4	Medical
	(United States) Joe Mattingley	SA Laribou	Gate 4	Lame
	(Brazil) Alexandre Razuck	HDL Pantheon	Gate 3	Lame
	(Canada) Julius Bloomfield	Avtar	Gate 3	Medical
	(Czech Republic) Ludmila Matejckova	Safir	Gate 3	Medical
	(Denmark) Grit Brint	El Metzo	Gate 3	Retired
	(Denmark) Gerda Hansen	Pyrus	Gate 3	Retired
	(Denmark) Inger Pitter Bertelsen	Puñadito	Gate 3	Lame
	(Finland) Johanna Strang-Ginouves	Felizja	Gate 3	Lame
	(Germany) Melanie Arnold	Nadira	Gate 3	Lame
	(Hungary) József Tóth	Hanima	Gate 3	Medical
	(Republic of Ireland) George Finlay	Mister Flint	Gate 3	Retired
	(Republic of Ireland) Emily Miller	DVS Tahini	Gate 3	Medical
	(Italy) Alfonso Striano	Cischi	Gate 3	Lame
	(Japan) Mitsuko Masui	Fax de Sky	Gate 3	Eliminated
	(Jordan) Farah Abunameh	Zarazeen	Gate 3	Eliminated
	(Jordan) Jehad Shhaltough	Qual	Gate 3	Eliminated
	(Lithuania) Danguole Lastauskaite	Lachran	Gate 3	Eliminated
	(Malaysia) Mohd Izry Razali	Bullio Sky Jack	Gate 3	Lame
	(Namibia) Karel Grunschloss	Malvina	Gate 3	Lame
	(Netherlands) Marjolein Vos-Sturrus	Black Magic	Gate 3	Medical
	(New Zealand) Shane Dougan	Vigar Riffal	Gate 3	Eliminated
	(Poland) Marcin Tobiasz	Ester	Gate 3	Lame
	(Qatar) Abdulla Towain Al-Marri	Saruk Nasra	Gate 3	Lame
	(Saudi Arabia) Taher Al-Turkmani	Fariseu	Gate 3	Lame
	(Switzerland) Veronika Häusler	Jannick CH	Gate 3	Lame
	(United Arab Emirates) Sultan bin Sulayem	Galagolan du Desert	Gate 3	Eliminated
	(Argentina) Josefina Chas	HR Shaklamieh	Gate 2	Lame
	(Argentina) Carolina Greenwalt	Jessie Q	Gate 2	Lame
	(Argentina) Susanna Lima	ZC Hyshan	Gate 2	Medical
	(Argentina) Mercedes Tapia	Ras Kasal	Gate 2	Lame
	(Bahrain) Sheikh Khalid bin Hamad Al-Khalifa	Herrero Dela Motte	Gate 2	Lame
	(Chile) Ana Maria Novoa Fuentealba	Galax	Gate 2	Medical
	(Hungary) Dalma Hosszú	Gáláns	Gate 2	Eliminated
	(Hungary) Csaba Mihók	Zafír	Gate 2	Lame
	(Italy) Carlo Gervasoni	Cosroe Gawhar	Gate 2	Medical
	(Japan) Midori Yasunaga	Manthanah	Gate 2	Lame
	(Jordan) Sayf Nasri Nowar	Anwan	Gate 2	Retired
	(Norway) Mariann Thorstensen	Electra	Gate 2	Lame
	(Oman) Loay bin Ghalib Al-Said	Hedgard	Gate 2	Lame
	(Qatar) Abdulla Abdul Rahman Fetais	Mansour	Gate 2	Lame
	(Russia) Igor Skladanyuk	Arfur	Gate 2	Lame
	(Saudi Arabia) Abdulhafeth Al-Turkomani	Etelle	Gate 2	Lame
	(South Africa) Naomi Muller	Kissing Kaysoun	Gate 2	Medical
	(Spain) Jordi Francas Boix	Tro de Malanyeu	Gate 2	Lame
	(Spain) Elisabeth Xalabarder Segales	Heavenroz de Pauté	Gate 2	Lame
	(Syria) Dea Toutounji	Haras Cophihol Omar	Gate 2	Lame
	(United Arab Emirates) Sheikh Hamdan bin Mohd Al Maktoum	Nashmi	Gate 2	Lame
	(United Arab Emirates) Sheikh Majid bin Mohd Al Maktoum	Hera de la Cruz	Gate 2	Medical
	(United Kingdom) Sally Hall	Galax	Gate 2	Lame
	(Argentina) Miguel Pavlovsky	Moro Tigre	Gate 1	Lame
	(Belgium) Michel Lequarre	Habibate Resin	Gate 1	Retired
	(Brazil) Marcio José Cardoso Honorio	Kadar Lamia	Gate 1	Medical
	(Canada) Karen Badger	Bree	Gate 1	Lame
	(Czech Republic) Petr Jadlovsky	Sumika	Gate 1	Lame
	(Czech Republic) Helena Terberova	Koryna	Gate 1	Lame
	(Denmark) Ingelise Kristoffersen	Dubai	Gate 1	Medical
	(Jordan) Hana Mazin Bishouty	Keops	Gate 1	Lame
	(New Zealand) Brian Tiffen	Sonny	Gate 1	Lame
	(Russia) Zalim Orishev	Signal	Gate 1	Lame
	(Slovakia) Prikryl Pavol	Sumaina	Gate 1	Retired
