= Najiba Al-Aasal =

Egyptian novelist and short story writer (1921–1991)

Najiba Al-Asal
- نجيبة العسال
- Born: 6 December 1921; Cairo, Egypt
- Died: 31 August 1991 (aged 69)
- Occupation: writer
- Years active: 1962–1991

Najiba Mahmoud al-Aasal (Arabic:نجيبة العسال) (6 December 1921 – 31 August 1991) was an Egyptian novelist and short story writer, born in Cairo. She is best known for her work that focused on women's and children's issues. Some of her books include "I left a whisper of silence," "All this because she is Eve," and "The Absent lady"(Gone). Her short stories were have been published in many magazines such as Al-Risala(message) Magazine and Al-Hilal (crescent) Magazine.

== Biography ==
Najiba Al-Aasal was born to an average family of nine, with two sisters and four brothers. Najiba considered as the older sister of the late great writer Fathia El-Aasal. Her father was strict and was absent from home due to his polygamy. He believed that female education is evil, which prompted him to prevent Najiba from completing her education, forcing her to marry at an early age, precisely at the age of 13. And because Najiba did not love her husband, she didn't last more than a year with him until she asked him for a divorce, her husband refused at first, but at 16 she divorced. Three months later, Najiba married her cousin, but this relationship was rooted in a love story that lasted from childhood.

== Work ==
Najiba Al-Aasal is the author of about 17 literary works, her works included novels, short stories, most of which are concerned with issues specific to women and children.

She founded a weekly literary salon for young writers at Dar al-Udaba’ in 1969 alongside Egyptian writers Ihsan Kamal and Huda Jad.

Her stories have been published in several magazines such as Al-Risala (Message) Magazine, Story Magazine, Al-Hilal (Crescent) Magazine, and other magazines.

== Bibliography ==
=== Novels ===
- The Far Depths, 1962.
- Absent (Gone), the National House for Printing and Publishing, Cairo, 1963.
- "Purl"\ "The Lame of Water", The Community of Trustees, 1969.
- Al-Midan \ "The Field", The Community of Trustees, 1969.
- Tender touch, Dar Al-Shaab Foundation for Press, Printing and Publishing, Cairo, 1975.
- “My Last Crisis,” Dar Al-Hilal Foundation, Cairo, 1980.
- “All this because she is Eve,” Egyptian Book General, Cairo, 1981.
- “I left a whisper of silence,”, the founder of Dar Al-Hilal, Cairo, 1982.
- In this novel, El-Aasal highlights the power of the written word, his representation in a literary representation, the feelings and suffering of others and the impulses of love in their hearts and sentiments. Al-Assal stresses the importance of appreciating the figure as it is from heaven and a great gift from life.
- The Wise Dove (yolk), Dar Al-Shaab (people's )Foundation for Press, Printing and Publishing, Cairo, 1983.
- The Fourth Wall, The Egyptian General Book Authority, Cairo, 1990.
- "A feather of gold from the Palace of Gold: the sweetest stories from the magical world of myths”, The Family Library, 1991.
- “From east to west.”
- Mountain Pebble.

=== Short stories ===
- “Voices on Trees” (The Message Magazine), Dar al-Risalah, Cairo, 1965.
- “The Thief and the Guard” (The Story Magazine), The Story Club, Cairo, 1965.
- “The race” (Al-Hilal magazine), Dar Al-Hilal Foundation, Cairo, 1972.
- “A good daughter” (Al-Hilal magazine), Dar Al-Hilal Foundation, Cairo, 1973.
- “The only witness” (Al-Hilal magazine), Dar Al-Hilal Foundation, Cairo, 1984.
- “My Father’s Shoes” (Al-Hilal Magazine), Dar Al-Hilal Foundation, Cairo, 1985.
- “The Empty Frame” (Al-Hilal Magazine), Dar Al-Hilal Foundation, Cairo, 1985.
- “The Other Face” (Al-Hilal Magazine), Dar Al-Hilal Foundation, Cairo, 1986.
- “All My Children” (Al-Hilal Magazine), Dar Al-Hilal Foundation, Cairo, 1987.
- “The Precious Jewel” (Al-Hilal Magazine), Dar Al-Hilal Foundation, Cairo, 1988.
- “It is my life” (Al-Hilal Magazine), Dar Al-Hilal Foundation, Cairo, 1989.
- “The Holy Apple” (Al-Hilal Magazine), Dar Al-Hilal Foundation, Cairo, 1989. Story

=== Collections (story sets) ===
- “House of Obedience,” The Community of Trustees, 1963
