= Ubach (surname) =

Ubach is a surname that has been associated with both Catalan and German origins.

Notable people of the surname include the following:

- Alanna Ubach (born 1975), American actor
- Anthony Ubach (1835–1907), Roman Catholic missionary
- Christiana Ubach (born 1987), Brazilian actress
- Miguel Vila Ubach (born 1972), Spanish jockey

== See also ==
- Wim Ubachs, Dutch physicist
