= Frances Stevens =

Frances Stevens may refer to:

- Frances Simpson Stevens (1894–1976), American painter
- Frances "Franco" Stevens (born 1967), founder of Curve magazine
