= Prudenciana Vallejo López de Moreno =

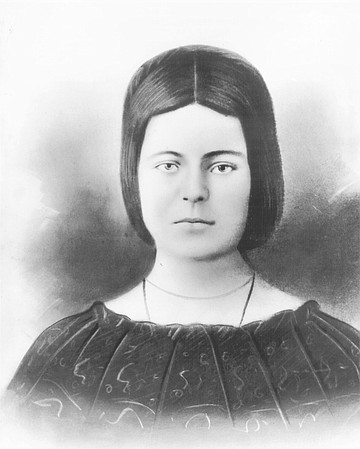
Prudenciana “Chanita” Vallejo López de Moreno (1833–1920)

Prudenciana Vallejo López de Moreno (1832–1920) was a Californio and the matriarch of a family who owned Rancho ex-Misíon de Guadalupe in the Valle de Guadalupe, Baja California, Mexico. She was the wife of José Matías Moreno, secretary of state under Pío Pico, the last Mexican governor of California.

== Early life ==
Prudenciana was the natural, or illegitimate, daughter of Juana López (1811-ca. 1860) and Mariano Guadalupe Vallejo, an Alta California governor and statesman. She was born seven months after Vallejo's marriage to her mother's cousin Francisca Benicia Carrillo de Vallejo and grew up in Old Town, San Diego among members of an extended family. Vallejo acknowledged Prudenciana as his daughter in an affectionate 1869 letter, and his daughter Luisa Eugenia Vallejo de Emparan recalled Prudenciana visiting the family at Lachryma Montis, Sonoma, in the 1860s.

Prudenciana's mother Juana López was descended from early Spanish settlers of California. Juana's parents were Juan José López (1786–1846) and María Eduvigis Arce de López (1792–1877). Her great-grandfather was José María Ygnacio López (ca. 1715–1781), a Catalan soldier who came to Alta California with the 1774 expedition of Juan Bautista de Anza. He returned in 1775 with his son Juan Francisco López (ca. 1742–1800).

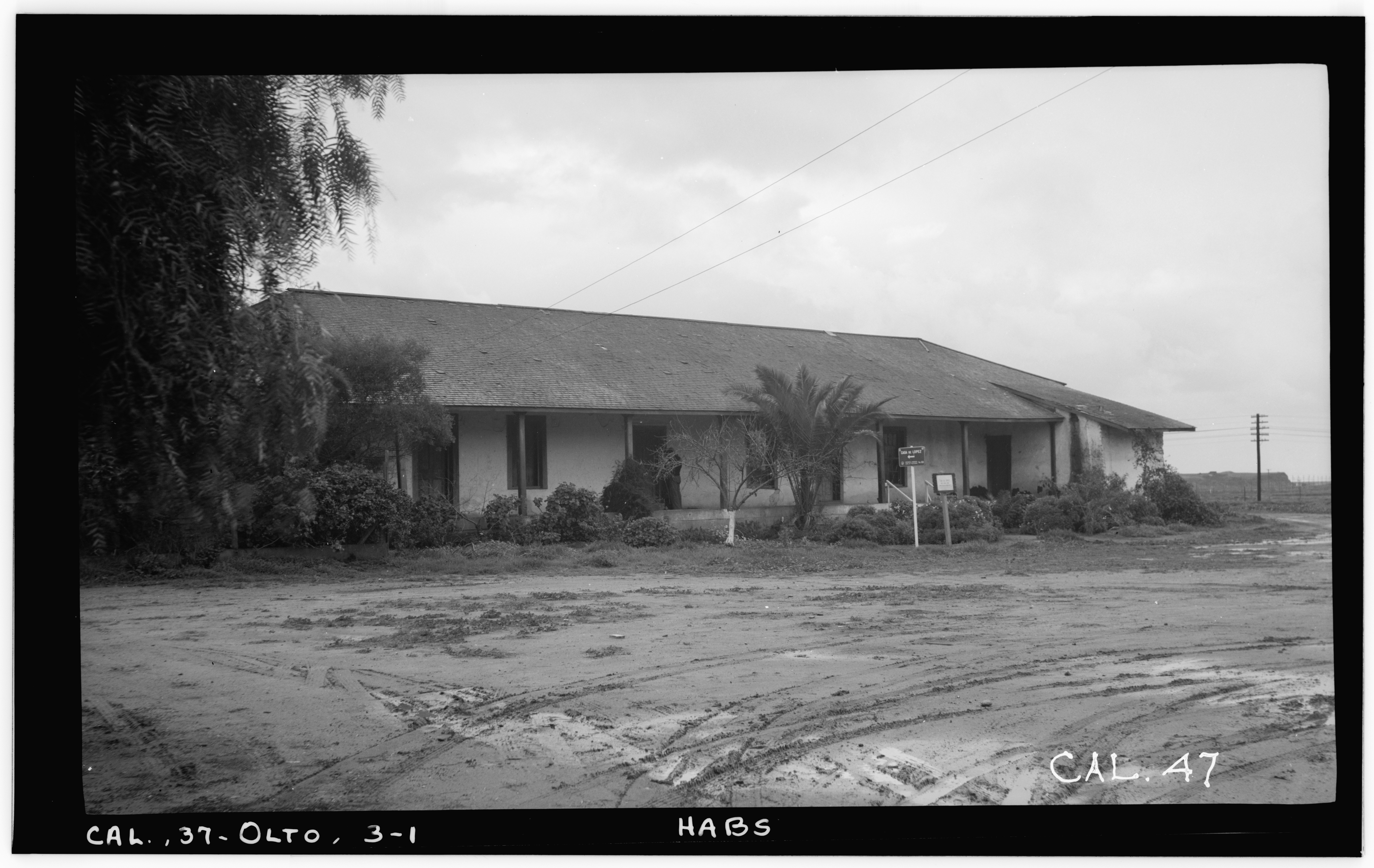
Casa de López, Old Town, San Diego, 1936

In the 1840s, Old Town, San Diego, consisted of two dozen adobe houses built around a central plaza. The population was a mix of Mexican residents, indigenous Kumeyaay, and a few American and European settlers. It was estimated that no more than 150 non-indigenous people lived there in 1840. Prudenciana lived in Casa de López, California Historical Landmark No. 60, which was most likely built by Juan José López in the 1820s.

During the U.S. Mexico War, Prudenciana was said to be one of the first people to notice the arrival of the sloop-of-war Cyane in San Diego harbor on July 29, 1846, crying out that “a million gringos are coming.” At age 14, she and the Machado children stood on the roof of the chapel of Casa de Machado y Silvas and watched the lowering of the Mexican flag and the raising of the American one. The U.S. military occupation of San Diego led to bitter divisions among residents who supported American rule and those who remained loyal to the Mexican government.

== Marriage and Family ==
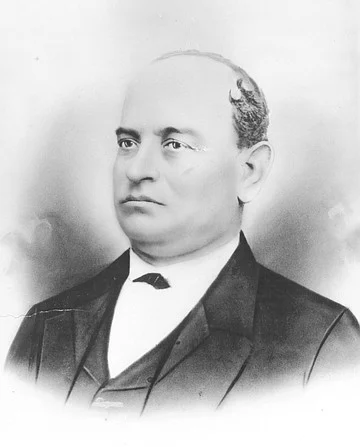
José Matías Moreno (1819–1869)

In 1851, when she was 19 years old, Prudenciana married José Matías Moreno, the former secretary of state to Pío Pico, the last Mexican governor of Alta California, and a former captain in the Mexican army during the U.S.-Mexico War. Moreno, who was 13 years older, scraped together a living as a merchant in San Diego and Los Angeles. They took up residence in Casa de López alongside other family members. Twelve years later, Moreno reminisced about the wedding in a letter to his wife, “Do you remember how chiflada [scatter-brained] you were that day? Do you remember that you danced a great deal?”

The couple would be separated for many years as war and business drew Moreno away from home for months at a time. The result was an extensive correspondence now in the archives of The Huntington Library.

Prudenciana and José Matías Moreno produced sixteen children, only three of whom survived to maturity: José Matías Moreno II (1852–1902), Dolores Moreno López de Flower (1855–1903), and Mateo Rafael Moreno (1864–1930). Letters testify to the couple's sorrow at the loss of their beloved children. In 1863, Moreno wrote of his “broken heart” in learning of the death of Constantino (b. 1859), who had come “to remove the bitterness with which my life was filled.” Prudenciana responded by assuring him that their remaining two children, José Matías and Dolores (Doloritas) “are robust and happy and I will see that they play in the sun, have a well-regulated life.” She added, “They take care of me and of each other which pleases me, and I need only your rapid return to be embraced in your arms…”

In the 1850s and 1860s, José Matías Moreno was involved in a wide variety of business projects that took him to San Francisco, La Paz, Mazatlán, Guaymas, and Mexico City. He bought and sold land, invested in Baja California gold mines, and worked as an agent on behalf of U.S. businessmen who wished to invest in Lower California. He was highly leveraged, and money was tight, particularly during the American Civil War. He often depended on the help of friends to send food supplies to his wife and family in San Diego.

In 1861, Moreno was appointed subjefe politico de la Frontera (deputy military chief) and commissioned to protect Baja California against filibusters, or unauthorized military expeditions aimed at capturing and annexing Lower California. To that end, he enforced a law prohibiting foreigners from owning land within 60-miles of the border, among them Juan Bandini, a Peruvian-born Californio. The Mexican government confiscated Rancho Tecate and Rancho Guadalupe which Bandini had been granted by former governor Pio Pico in a move of dubious legality. José Matías Moreno's subsequent purchase of those properties led to considerable bad feeling. Prudenciana, who lived among members of the Bandini family in Old Town, was subject to gossip by her neighbors.

== Valle de Guadalupe, Baja California, Mexico ==
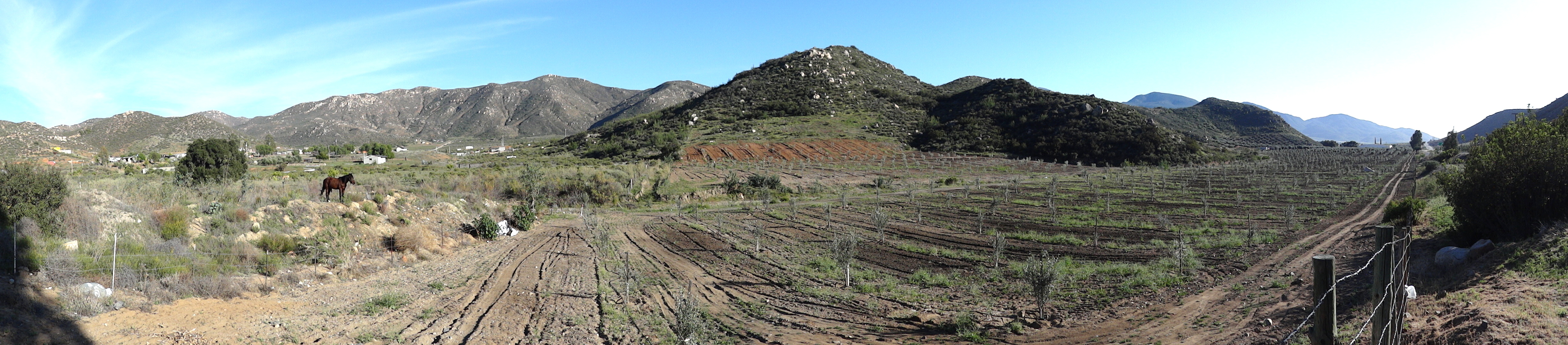
Panorama of the Valle de Guadalupe, BC, Mexico, 2012

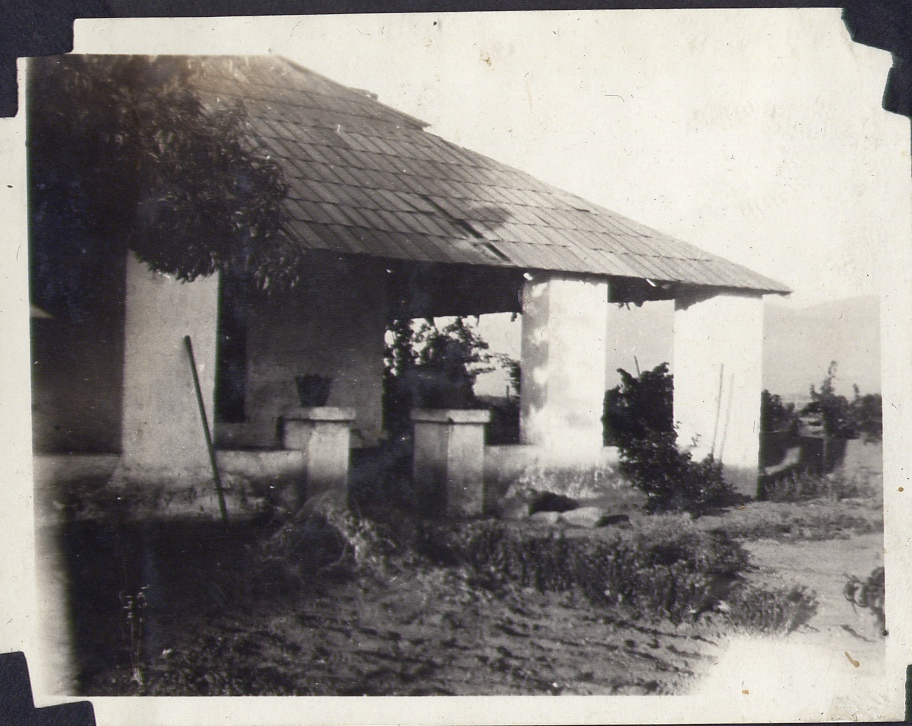
Ranch house, ex-Misión de Guadalupe, the Moreno family home, Valle de Guadalupe, ca. 1900

When her husband secured title to Rancho Guadalupe in 1863 and began to develop the property, Prudenciana joined him there. The former lands of the ex-Misión de Nuestra Señora de Guadalupe del Norte, the ranch was in the fertile Valle de Guadalupe, Baja California, not far from Ensenada. Chaparral-covered mountains flanked the Rio Guadalupe which meandered across the plain. Cattle roamed the valley. Sandy but fertile soil supported the production of wheat, olives, grape vines, pears, and apricots.

Kumeyaay (Kumiai) lived in rancherías in the valley, the largest of which was Rincón de los Encinos. A grove of Coast Live Oaks (Quercus agrifolia) defined the location of the settlement. The indigenous population numbered around 330 in 1885.

Prudenciana, who spoke the native language, was called on in times of crisis to provide first aid. Like many women of her generation, she could sew up a wound, act as a midwife, and make use of medicinal herbs. She, in turn, relied on the Kumiai community for protection when her husband was absent.

At the age of 37, Prudenciana became a widow. José Matías Moreno died of a stroke on November 30, 1869, at the age of 51 and was buried at the ex-Misión de Guadalupe. She inherited large landholdings, little money, and considerable debts. She relied on the help of Father Antonio D. Ubach, a longtime friend, to help her with complicated legal problems.

Shortly after Moreno's death, a pair of enterprising brothers, George Anson Flower and Theron Andrew Flower, worked to get hold of the Moreno land in the Valle de Guadalupe. Natives of New York, the Flowers had moved to California during the Gold Rush and ended up in San Diego running a wholesale liquor business. George, aged 39, courted and married Prudenciana's 16-year-old daughter Dolores in 1871. Theron A. Flower, meanwhile, loaned the Moreno estate $7,000. When the Panic of 1873 and the resulting economic depression made it impossible for the family to meet its obligations, Theron Flower tried to foreclose on the property. A compromise settlement was reached which allowed the Flowers to operate the ranch. After a lengthy lawsuit initiated by Prudenciana's son, José Matías Moreno III, Theron Flower purchased the Rancho ex-Misión de Guadalupe (13,014 acres (5,267 ha)) for $15,000 in 1887. Some of this land was sold in 1907 to Russian Molokans, a group of religious dissenters who fled persecution in their own country.

Prudenciana and her heirs retained Rancho San Marcos or Huecos y Baldíos (12,355 acres (5,000 ha)) and El Tigre (8,676 acres (3,511 ha)), among other properties, until 1943 when the last of the ranch lands were sold.

== Final Years ==
In the 1870s, historian Hubert Howe Bancroft was engaged in writing his History of California (1884–1890). To that end, he employed Thomas Savage, among others, to seek out documents from the Mexican period. On a trip to San Diego in January 1878, Savage persuaded Prudenciana to allow him to examine 3,000 or more letters and other materials kept a trunk in Casa de López. She allowed him to borrow items for use in Bancroft's history, even though "she looked upon her late husband's papers as a treasure," and returned home the next day. Her rapid exit caused Savage to wonder whether she had much more valuable material at her home in the Valle de Guadalupe.

Prudenciana spent the years between 1887 and her death in 1920 living with family members in the Valle de Guadalupe, San Diego, and Los Angeles. She continued to keep up appearances, having been noted for her meticulous grooming which included gloves and a hat even when making trips to the local store. A devout Catholic, she wore black clothing and shawls or mantillas after her husband's death. Her descendants recall her speaking Spanish rapidly in a high voice and moving quickly around a room. She prefaced her stories about her life with, “Cuando you era Feliz con Moreno” or “When I was happy with Moreno.”

Prudenciana Vallejo López de Moreno died in Los Angeles on January 1, 1920, at the age of 88. She was buried in Calvary Cemetery (Los Angeles). She was survived by Mateo Rafael Moreno (1864–1930) and the descendants of José Matías Moreno III (1852–1902) and Dolores Moreno López de Flower (1855–1903). She was recalled as a pioneer woman whose life spanned a period of dramatic change in the history of Alta and Baja California.
