= Ubach =

Ubach may refer to:

- Ubach (surname)
- Übach-Palenberg, town in Germany
- Ubach over Worms, village in the Netherlands
- Ubach creek, watercourse in Western Australia
