= José Matías Moreno =

Mexican governor (1819 to 1869)

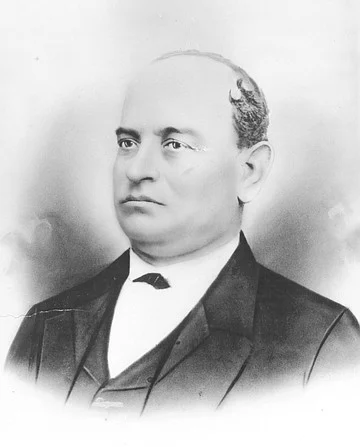

Military Chief of the Northern Frontier District of Baja California
- In office 11 March 1861 – 25 April 1862
- Preceded by: José Sáenz
- Succeeded by: Cecilio Zérega

Secretary of State of Alta California
- In office 1845 – August 1846
- Governor: Pío Pico
- Succeeded by: Office abolished (U.S. occupation)

Personal details
- Born: 1819 Mission San Antonio, Province of Baja California, Viceroyalty of New Spain (now San Antonio, Baja California Sur, Mexico)
- Died: November 30, 1869 Rancho ex-Misión de Guadalupe, Baja California Territory, Mexico
- Spouse: Prudenciana Vallejo López de Moreno (m. 1851)
- Occupation: Politician; ranchero

Military service
- Allegiance: Mexico
- Battles/wars: Mexican–American War; Battle of San José del Cabo; Skirmish of Todos Santos

José Matías Moreno II (1819–1869) was a Mexican merchant, landowner, and public official in 19th-century Alta and Baja California. He served as secretary of state of Alta California under the last Mexican governor, Pío Pico, during the final months of Mexican rule. Following U.S. occupation, he participated in guerrilla resistance against U.S. forces in Baja California and later served as political and military chief of the region.

== Early life and education ==
José Matías Moreno II was one of eight children born in Baja California Sur to Dolores Ramírez Carillo and Joseph Mathew Brown, a British whaler who changed his name to José Matías Moreno, became a Mexican citizen, and converted to Catholicism. The latter died not long after his son José's birth in 1819. Dolores then married Tomás Altamirano, a San Antonio merchant, and settled in Old Town, San Diego.

Moreno did not immediately follow his mother and stepfather to San Diego but remained in Baja California Sur to study with Father Gabriel González, a Spanish-born Dominican priest. In 1842, he was involved in a rebellion that took place in La Paz, Baja California Sur, part of an effort organized by González in opposition to a decree that opened the ex-mission lands to colonization by private individuals.

== Mexican–American War (1846–1848) ==
In the 1840s, Moreno made his living as a merchant in San Diego and Los Angeles. By 1846, he was employed as provisional secretary of state of Alta California under the authority of Governor Pío Pico. He was both a civil servant and a military officer with the title Capitan de los Defensores de la Independencia National.

Doña Felipa Osuna de Marrón, at that time living at Mission San Luis Rey, recalled a visit by Moreno at the start of the Mexican–American War. He had come to tell her that her cousin, Pío Pico, was in hiding at Santa Margarita. When armed men showed up to arrest Moreno, she hid him by ordering him into bed with a rag around his head so that he appeared to be sick. The Americans searched the house but did not recognize him and soon left.

Moreno joined Governor Pío Pico in Mexico where they petitioned for arms, munitions, men, and money to defend Alta California. Towards the conclusion of the war in 1848, Pico returned to Los Angeles as a private citizen, but Moreno remained in Mexico. There, he raised a company of guerrilla soldiers to combat U.S. forces in Baja California. He was arrested after the Skirmish of Todos Santos along with Father Gabriel González and many other prominent Mexican leaders. All were sent to Mazatlan where they remained prisoners until the signing of the Treaty of Guadalupe Hidalgo.

== Marriage ==
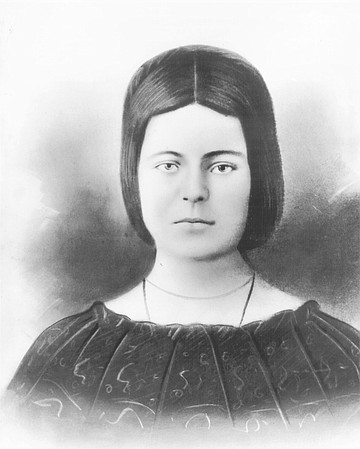
Prudenciana “Chanita” Vallejo López (1833–1920)

After the war, Moreno returned to San Diego where he married Prudenciana Vallejo López (1833–1920) on November 4, 1851. She was the natural daughter of Mariano Guadalupe Vallejo and Juana López. Her mother was descended from Ignacio López, a Catalan soldier who came to Alta California with the 1774 expedition of Juan Bautista de Anza.

The couple lived in Casa de López in Old Town, San Diego, where they maintained connections with many of the old Californio families. José Matías Moreno's half-brother was José Antonio Altamirano who married Ysabel de Pedrorena and lived in the nearby Casa de Pedrorena de Altamirano.

The couple would be separated for many years as war and business drew Moreno away from his wife and family. The result was an extensive correspondence now in the archives of The Huntington Library.

In 1851, Moreno served briefly in a company of volunteers composed of San Diegans temporarily mustered into the U.S. Army to put down Antonio Garra's revolt against American settlers and government officials who encroached on Cupeño lands.

== Business and politics ==
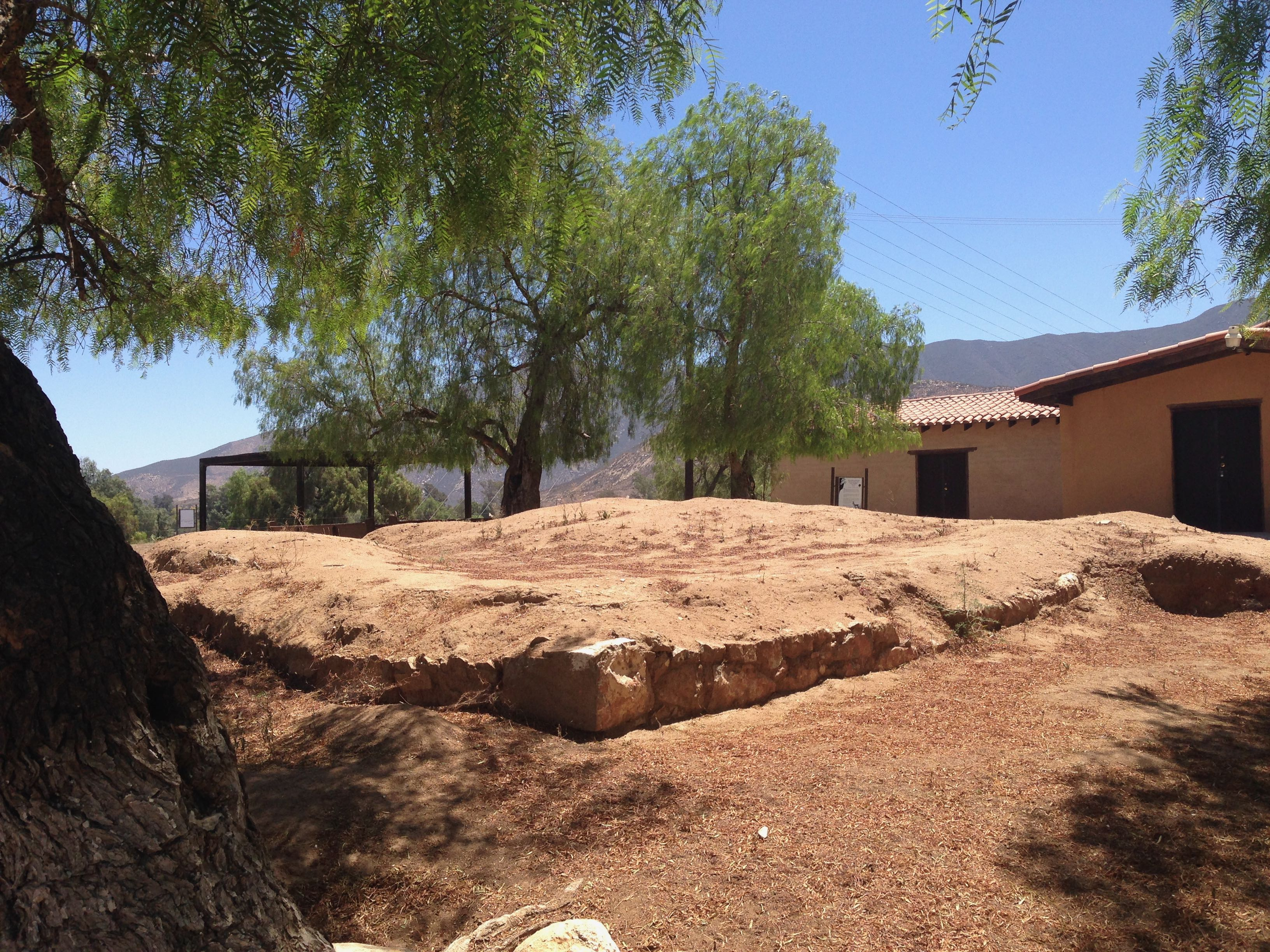
Ruins of the ex-Misíon de Guadalupe, Valle de Guadalupe, Baja California, Mexico

In the 1850s and 1860s, Moreno bought and sold land and invested in mining, lumber, and cattle ranching. Reputed to have influence with the regional Mexican government at La Paz, he “was sought after as an agent by U.S. businessmen who wished to invest in Baja California.” He frequently traveled to San Francisco, La Paz, Mazatlán, Guaymas, and Mexico City. During this time, his wife Prudenciana and their growing family lived in Old Town, San Diego. Money was tight as California lived in the shadow of the American Civil War. Moreno often found that San Francisco “Yankees are very false in their dealings.” He was not happy in San Diego, either, where political unrest and racial animosities made the environment difficult. In 1863, he wrote, “I am ‘fed up’ with that town."

In 1861, Moreno was appointed subjefe político de La Frontera (deputy military chief) and commissioned to protect the interests of the Mexican government. He and a garrison of troops made their headquarters at the Rancho ex-Misíon de Guadalupe where they worked to undermine filibusters, or unauthorized military expeditions that aimed to capture and annex Lower California. Moreno produced La relación estadística de los pueblos, ex-misiones y ranchos del Partido Norte de la Frontera de la Baja California, an important source of information about the border region.

He made political enemies by enforcing an 1853 law prohibiting foreigners from owning land within 60 miles of the border, among them Juan Bandini, a Peruvian-born Californio. Bandini had supported the North Americans during the U.S.-Mexico War and was considered a traitor by the Mexican government. To prevent Bandini from supporting a U.S. filibuster attack, the government confiscated Rancho Tecate and Rancho Guadalupe which had been granted to Bandini by former governor Pío Pico in a move of dubious legality.

Moreno's loyalty to the Mexican government made it possible for him to purchase Bandini's former ranchos in Tecate and the Valle de Guadalupe. He was also granted the salt concession at San Quintín and several mining sites.

Moreno was a republican and a liberal who believed in freedom, equality, and human rights. During the second French intervention in Mexico (1861–67), a military invasion of the Republic of Mexico by the French Empire of Napoleon III, Moreno celebrated September 16, Mexico's Independence Day, by recalling the Don Miguel Hidalgo's Cry of Dolores which triggered the Mexican War of Independence. Moreno wrote, “Long Live Independence! Long live free America! Death to the tyrants and slavery! Death to the King!!!...The sentiment is more grand and sublime in these actual circumstances in which some traitor favored by the French despots wish to destroy our nationality, tearing down the Republic in order to place upon us a king.”

== Valle de Guadalupe, Baja California ==
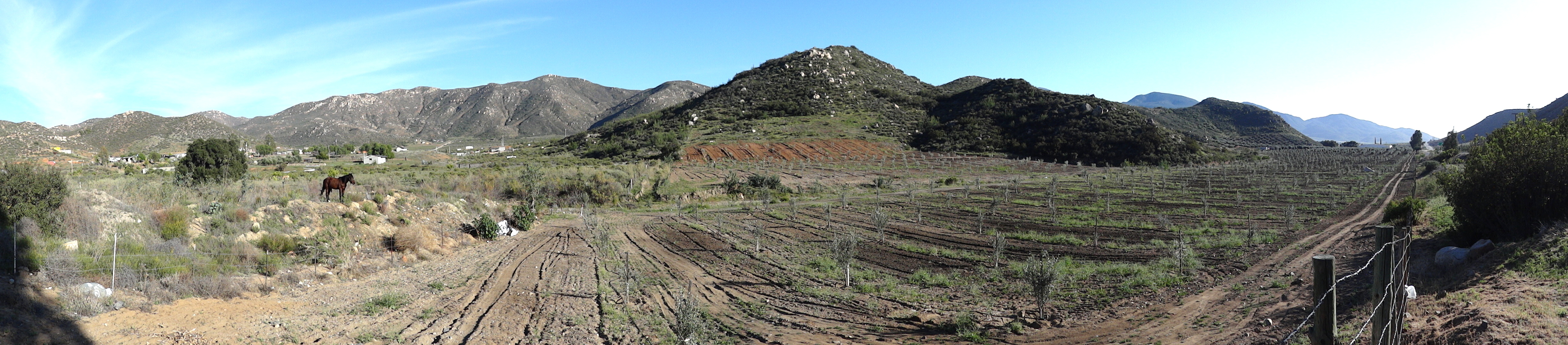
Panorama of the Valle de Guadalupe, BC, Mexico, 2012

In 1858, in the wake of a mining boom in Baja California, the Mexican government sold what it described as terrines baldíos or "unoccupied" lands, including the Rancho ex-Misíon de Guadalupe in the fertile Valle de Guadalupe located east of Ensenada. Ignoring the rights of indigenous people who lived in rancherías in the area, the government divided the valley into several large ranches: Ex-Misión de Guadalupe (13,014 acres (5,267 ha)), San Marcos or Huecos y Baldíos (12,355 acres (5,000 ha)), Santa Cruz (6,177 acres (2,500 ha)), San Antonio (6,177 acres (2,500 ha)), and El Tigre (8,676 acres (3,511 ha)).

In 1863, Moreno secured a clear title to Rancho ex-Misíon de Guadalupe which included a ruined adobe house, 2,000 grape vines in poor condition, an orchard, and farmland. He purchased an additional 40,000 acres of land, including El Tigre and Valle de las Palmas. Having retired from his role as subjefe político, he pursued ranching and farming. His wife and children left Old Town, San Diego, and joined him there.

== Death and legacy ==
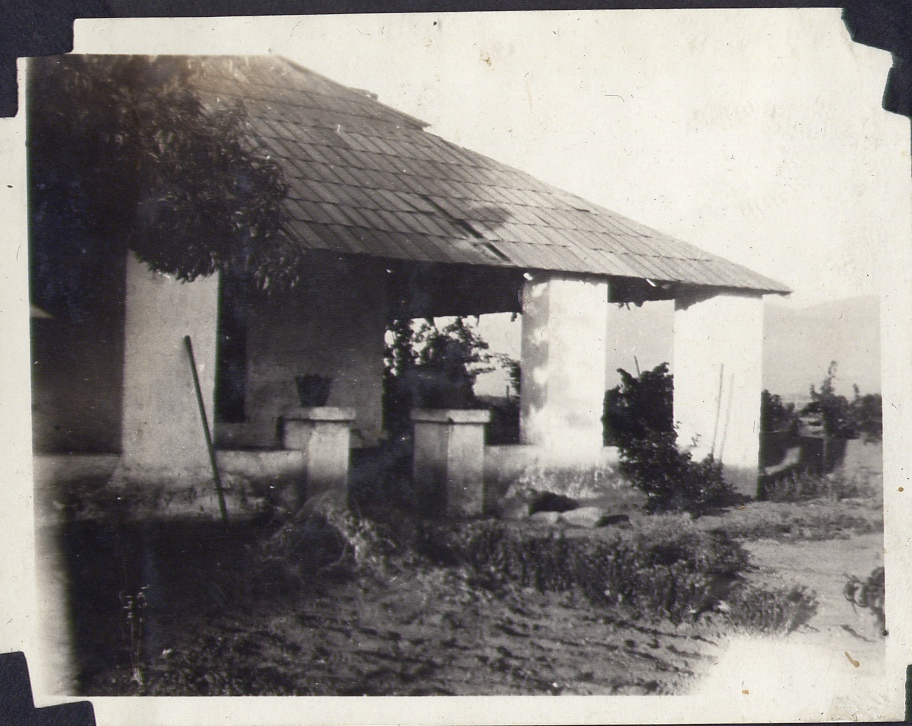
Ranch house, ex-Misión de Guadalupe, later Moreno family home, Valle de Guadalupe, BC, Mexico, ca. 1900

Moreno died of a stroke on November 30, 1869, at the age of 51 and was buried on the grounds of the Rancho ex-Misíon de Guadalupe. Reverend Antonio Ubach officiated at the burial.

He left behind a contested legacy. Rufus K. Porter, the San Diego correspondent of the San Francisco Bulletin, provided one viewpoint: “Don Matías…had more influence with the La Paz authorities than any other man outside the Territory, and was probably the cause of more bloodshed than any other man in California. While he remained safely in San Diego, and was generally respected here, his letters and emissaries were playing the very deuce among the Mexicans below the line. He was the cause of the murder of General Castro beyond a doubt, and his representations to the authorities at Mazatlán caused the defeat and flight of [Feliciano] Esparza…” Porter added that Moreno's life “was an eventful one and his autobiography would be one of the most interesting of modern times, and I am inclined to the opinion that such a document exists among his papers.”

Moreno was survived by his wife Prudenciana Vallejo López de Moreno and their children, only three of whom lived to maturity: José Matías Moreno II (1852–1902), Dolores Moreno López de Flower (1855–1903), and Mateo Rafael Moreno (1864–1930).
