= Lesbian Visibility Week =

Annual observance

- Observed by: LGBT community, lesbians
- Type: Visibility week
- Duration: 1 week
- Frequency: Annual
- First time: 1990

Lesbian Visibility Week (related to Lesbian Visibility Day) is an annual observance in the United States, the United Kingdom and other countries dedicated to increasing the awareness of lesbian women and their issues. It was originally celebrated in July in 1990 in California, and more recently in April, around the Lesbian Visibility Day, which is celebrated on April 26. It has been celebrated in England and Wales.

== Historical observations ==
In mid-July from 1990 to 1992 in West Hollywood, Lesbian Visibility Week was celebrated annually. It was conceived out of lesbians' frustrations with the higher visibility of gay men than lesbians, and intended to gain awareness and sociopolitical capital.

The week was coordinated by West Hollywood Lesbian Visibility Committee and the Los Angeles Gay and Lesbian Center and devoted to raising awareness of lesbian identities and topics and celebrating the lesbian community. The celebration was "a combination of cultural programming, workshops addressing current and impending needs, awards ceremonies, and social events." The events included film screenings, safe sex discussions, dog shows, marches, and more.

== Recent observations ==
=== 2020 ===
In 2020, Linda Riley, publisher of Diva magazine, began a new Lesbian Visibility Week. The inaugural week took place from the 20th of April 2020, ending on Lesbian Visibility Day, 26 April. LGBT speakers included president of GLAAD Sarah Kate Ellis Henderson, BBC Newsreader Jane Hill, and UK Black Pride founder Phyll Opoku Gyimah. Some brands and companies hosted their own events.

=== 2021 ===
Lesbian Visibility Week 2021 took place between 26 April and 2 May 2021, and was powered by DIVA magazine, Stonewall (a charity) and Facebook. During this week, the Mayor of London Sadiq Khan flew the lesbian flag at City Hall, London to launch the week.

=== 2022 ===
Lesbian Visibility Week 2022 was celebrated from April 25 to May 1, 2022.

=== 2023 ===
Lesbian Visibility Week 2023, celebrated from April 24 to April 30, 2023, highlighted the theme of trans-inclusivity, featuring collaborations with prominent organizations such as Deliveroo, Greene King, GLAAD, and Mermaids. The week was notable for its use of social media campaigns employing hashtags like #LWithTheT and #LVW23 to promote engagement and visibility across the LGBTQIA+ community. A highlight of the week was the DIVA Awards, hosted by Sophie Ward, which underscored the achievements within the sapphic community.

=== 2024 ===
Lesbian Visibility Week 2024, celebrated April 22 to April 28, 2024, highlighted the theme of being #UnifiedNotUniform, bringing people together across differences while celebrating the full spectrum of uniqueness and individuality in LGBTQ+ identity. The Curve Foundation launched the inaugural Curve Power List, recognizing outstanding LGBTQ women and non-binary trailblazers in North America making social and cultural impact in their chosen fields. Notable Power List members in 2024 included Cheryl Dunye, Imani Rupert-Gordon, Brandi Carlile, and Billie Jean King. Another highlight of this year was Tony Evers, Governor of the State of Wisconsin, proclaiming Lesbian Visibility Week an official state observance.

=== 2025 ===
Lesbian Visibility Week 2025, celebrated April 21 to April 27, 2025 highlighted the theme of rainbow families, a global campaign celebrating all the beauty the LGBTQ+ community brings to family life, using the hashtag #LVW25. This year saw the launch of Queer Women in Sports Day (celebrated on the Saturday in Lesbian Visibility Week), founded by Frances_"Franco"_Stevens, to celebrate the achievements and contributions of queer women and nonbinary athletes, observed on April 26 that year. In San Francisco two significant events of Lesbian Visibility Week 2025 were the Flag Raising and Reception at San Francisco City Hall on April 24, and the Lighting of San Francisco City Hall on the evening of April 27.

=== 2026 ===
Lesbian Visibility Week 2026, celebrated April 20 to April 26, 2026 highlighted the theme of Health and Wellbeing, using the hashtag #LVW26. This LVW featured Wellness Wednesday (a continuation from previous years), landing on April 22, 2026, in addition to the second observation of Queer Women in Sports Day, on April 25, 2026.

== Lesbian Visibility Flag ==
Flag	Name	Meaning
	Lesbian Visibility Flag (7-stripe version)	The seven-stripe lesbian pride flag represents lesbian pride and the lesbian community. The flag features shades of orange, white, and pink, symbolizing gender non-conformity, independence, community, unique relationships to womanhood, serenity and peace, love and sex, and femininity.
	Lesbian Visibility Flag (5-stripe version)	A simplified five-stripe version of the lesbian pride flag, maintaining the core symbolism while using fewer stripes for easier reproduction and display.

== Lesbian Visibility Logo 2026 ==
Logo	Information
	In 2026, LVW's identity evolved to reflect a broader North American perspective, integrating its presence across the United States and Canada. This shift honors an expanding reach and reinforces a commitment to cross-border celebration.

== Related observations ==
International Lesbian Day is a related observation that is observed on October 8 annually. It started in New Zealand in the 1980s and is celebrated mainly in New Zealand and Australia.

Sapphic Visibility Day is observed on April 9 annually. It started in the US as a celebration of the diverse identities within the LGBTQ+ spectrum, emphasizing the significance of sapphic individuals - including queer, nonbinary, and transgender people.

National Day of Lesbian Visibility (Portuguese: Dia Nacional da Visibilidade Lésbica) is an established date in Brazil created by Brazilian lesbian activists and dedicated to the date on which the 1st National Lesbian Seminar - Senale took place, on August 29, 1996. It happens every August 29 since 2003.

== In popular culture ==
Several celebrities have come out in Lesbian Visibility Day including Megan Rapinoe, Da Brat, and Lena Waithe.

== See also ==
- Lesbian erasure
- Social invisibility
