= Fathia (given name) =

Fathia is a feminine given name of Arabic origin. Notable people with the name include:

== Given name ==
- Fathia Absie, Somali-American writer, producer, actor and filmmaker
- Fathia Amaimia (born 1989), Tunisian Paralympic athlete
- Fathia al-Assal (1933–2014), Egyptian playwright and activist
- Faithia Balogun (born 1969), Nigerian film actor
- Fathia Bettahar (1936–2021), Algerian teacher, policy advisor, and women's rights activist
- Fathia Ali Bouraleh (born 1987), track and field sprint athlete who competes for Djibouti
- Fathia Ghali (1930–1976), Princess of Egypt until 1950
- Fathia Izzati (born 1994), Indonesian YouTuber, singer, songwriter, and actress
- Fathia Ayodele Karim, Ghanaian doctor
- Fathia Nuri Khalid (1946–2018), Libyan teacher
- Fathia Latiff (born 1987), Malaysian actress and model
- Fathia Nkrumah (1931–2007), First Lady of Ghana
- Fathia Youssouf (born 2006), French actress
