= Curve (magazine) =

Global lesbian media project

- Curve, January 2009
- Former editors: Merryn Johns, Diane Anderson-Minshall, Gretchen Lee, Katie Sanborn
- Categories: Lifestyle magazine
- Founder: Frances "Franco" Stevens
- Founded: 1990 (as Deneuve)
- Company: The Curve Foundation
- Based in: US
- Language: English
- Website: www.curvemag.com
- ISSN: 1087-867X
- OCLC: 60622960

Curve is a global lesbian media project. It covers news, politics, social issues, and includes celebrity interviews and stories on entertainment, pop culture, style, and travel.

== History and profile ==
Founded by Frances "Franco" Stevens in San Francisco in 1990. While working at A Different Light Bookstore she noticed that bookstores and newsstands had few lesbian publications to offer, so she decided to do something about it. Curve was first published as Deneuve magazine. To fund the publication, Stevens applied for numerous credit cards, then took the borrowed money to the race track, winning enough money to cover the first three issues. The lifestyle magazine reported on the lesbian scene, fashion, fiction, music and film, and rumors from the lesbian community. The first issue of Deneuve hit the newsstands with Katie Sanborn as managing editor and sold out in six days.

Stevens caused controversy by "putting the word lesbian on the front cover because that meant every time somebody wanted to buy it, they were essentially coming out to anyone standing around them, anyone who saw it in their house." Over time, the magazine secured mainstream advertising deals, and famous faces like tennis player Martina Navratilova and singer Melissa Etheridge posed for the cover.

The magazine was rebranded as Curve in 1996 after a trademark dispute with French actress Catherine Deneuve. DJ Page Hodel hosted the "Alive and Kicking" legal aid benefit to help the magazine overcome the financial impact of the lawsuit.

Curve has been considered a perennial leader in reporting on a range of cultural issues, often writing about topics that were then picked up by mainstream media. Before the marriage equality movement picked up steam, Curve published an article about negotiating partner benefits in the workplace, in the December 1993 issue. Curve wrote about cybersex in 1995. In 2003, Curve was early in reporting on pregnancies within the queer community. Curve had a feature on gender queer fashion in Brooklyn, titled "Tomboys Rule Brooklyn" in the September 1996 issue. In 1999, Curve launched a website with online subscriptions, videos, books, and discussion boards.

Diane Anderson-Minshall was editor-in-chief when the magazine was acquired in October 2010 by Australian media company, Avalon Media. Under the ownership of Avalon Media, Curve was headquartered in Sydney with Merryn Johns as editor-in-chief and reported its circulation at 52,237, and a 182,831 readership with a median household income of $85,372. Founded by Silke Bader, Avalon Media also published Lesbians on the Loose (LOTL) and Bound magazines in Australia.

In 2021, Curve magazine was re-acquired by Founder Franco Stevens and donated to The Curve Foundation, with its mission to "empower lesbian, queer women, trans women, and non-binary people to share culture and stories, connect with each other, and raise visibility."

Curve was featured on the Showtime television series The L Word when a fictional writer for the magazine interviews Jenny Schecter, one of the characters, was interviewed about her book.

In 2026, Curve is celebrating 35 years under its current name, having rebranded from Deneuve in 1991.

== Ahead of the Curve ==
Ahead of the Curve is a feature documentary film that tells the story of the founder of Curve magazine, the magazine's rise to fame and its aspirations for the future of lesbian and queer media. The film is co-produced and co-directed by Jen Rainin and Rivkah Beth Medow, with music composed by Meshell Ndegeocello.

Ahead of the Curve premiered at Frameline, the San Francisco international LGBTQ+ film festival, in 2020 and received the Grand Prix du Jury at the Image+Nation Film Festival. The film also received Audience Awards for Best Documentary at aGLIFF, Reeling: The Chicago LGBTQ+ International Film Festival, Tampa International Gay and Lesbian Film Festival and the Connecticut LGBT Film Festival.

Ahead of the Curve was released in theaters, digital platforms and DVD on June 1, 2021.

== Controversy ==
In a 2000 interview with Curve, Sinead O'Connor commented, "I'm a dyke… although I haven't been very open about that and throughout most of my life I've gone out with blokes because I haven't necessarily been terribly comfortable about being a big lesbian mule. But I actually am a dyke." However, soon after in an interview in The Independent, she stated, "I believe it was overcompensating of me to declare myself a lesbian. It was not a publicity stunt. I was trying to make someone else feel better. And have subsequently caused pain for myself. I am not in a box of any description."

In May 2007, actress Michelle Rodriguez criticized Curve and accused its editors of attempting to "out" her. Rodriguez stated, "As far as rumors go of me coming out, I guess Curve magazine took it upon themselves to out me on the premise of their own suspicions.... to put words in someone's mouth and place people in categories affects them for sure, especially in this business." Her comments ended up angering many in the gay community and some even accused her of being homophobic. Rodriguez has denied those claims as well.

In the July/August 2007 issue of Curve, editors responded to this criticism by stating: "If you read the article, you will see that the author did not, in fact, 'out' Rodriguez; rather, the article stated both that "Rodriguez has never publicly come out" and "Rodriguez has said she is not a lesbian."

== The Curve Foundation ==
Launched in 2021, The Curve Foundation amplifies the voices of LGBTQ+ women and non-binary people, creating a searchable archive from the 30 years of magazine issues, and supporting journalists in the tradition of Curve magazine.

Franco Stevens's path to launching The Curve Foundation is documented in the 2021 film Ahead of the Curve.

== See also ==
- Lesbian feminism
- Lesbian literature
- Lesbians
- List of lesbian periodicals
- LGBT culture in San Francisco
