= Casa de López =

Historical Landmark in San Diego, California, United States

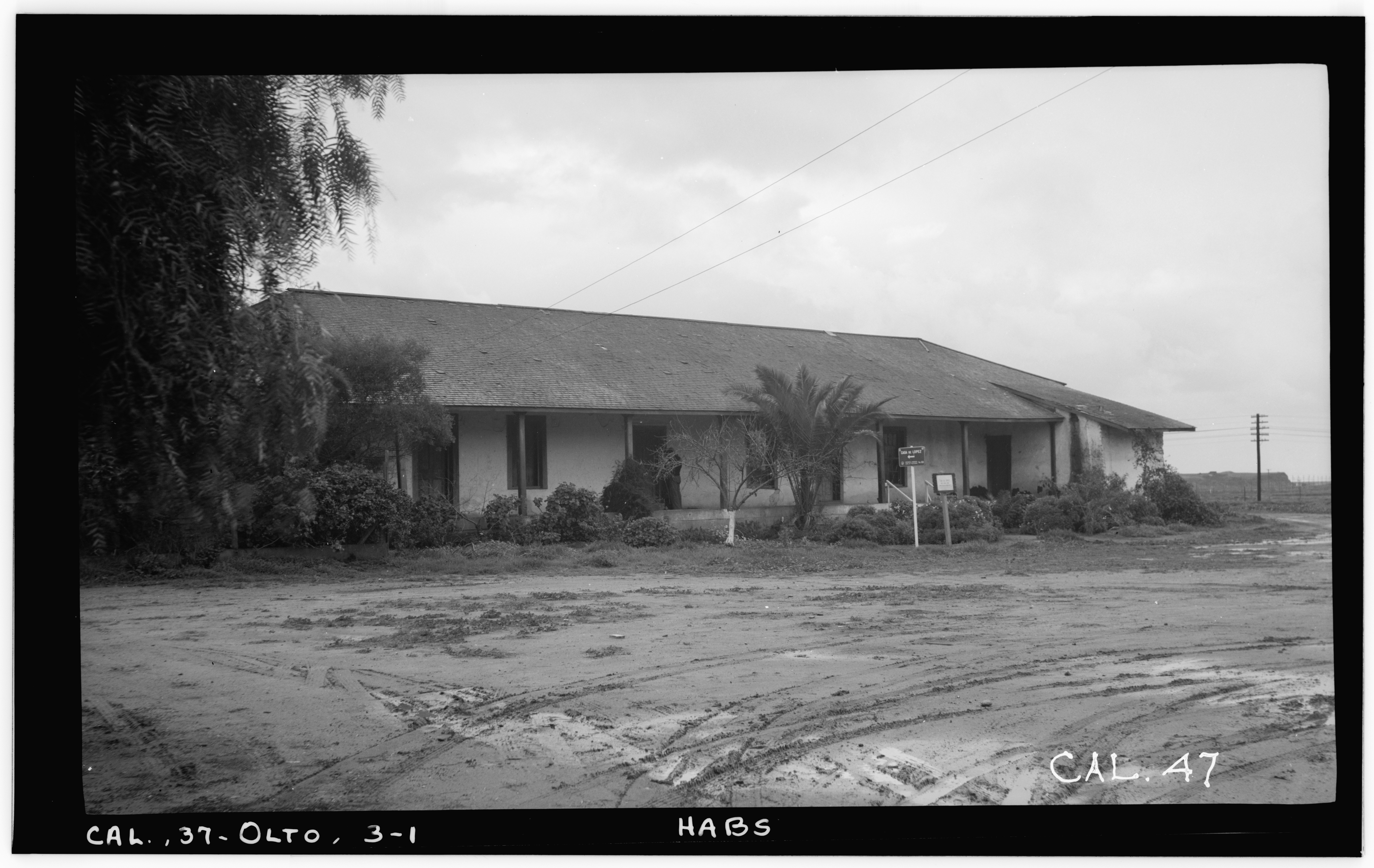
- Casa de López in 1936

- Location within California Location within the United States
- 32.7519°N 117.1969°W
- Location: 3890 Twiggs Street, San Diego, California

History
- Built: 1835

Site notes
- Architect: unknown
- Architectural style: Adobe

California Historical Landmark
- Designated: December 6, 1932
- Reference no.: 60

Casa de López was a historical adobe building in San Diego, California, constructed in the early 1800s. The Casa de López site is a California Historical Landmark No. 60, listed on December 6, 1932. Often called la casa larga, or long house, it was built for the López family, early Spanish settlers of San Diego.

== History ==
Casa de López was said to have been built in 1835 by Juan Francisco López (ca. 1742-1800) who came to Alta California with the 1775 expedition of Juan Bautista de Anza, but it is more likely that it was constructed by his son Juan José López (1786-1846) in the 1820s. It was the largest structure in Old Town, San Diego, and one of the earliest to be built outside the walls of the Presidio. Originally, it had a view overlooking the mouth of the San Diego River and San Diego Bay.

Spanish settlers used indigenous labor and building techniques to construct their homes. The single-story house had adobe brick walls built on a river-cobble foundation. The roof was constructed using pine timbers from the Cuyamaca forest and covered with clay tiles. Walls were painted with a lime-based whitewash, inside and out, and interior floors were originally made of earth and pine-boards.

In the 1840s, Casa de López was one of two dozen adobe houses located on or near a central plaza. The population of Old Town was a mix of Mexican residents, indigenous Kumeyaay people, Hawaiian islanders, and a few American and European settlers. It was estimated that no more than 150 non-indigenous people lived there in 1840.

During the U.S.-Mexico War, the population of Old Town expanded as Californio families abandoned outlying ranchos and took refuge there. The American occupation of San Diego led to bitter divisions among residents who supported U.S. military rule and those who remained loyal to the Mexican government.

In 1851, newly married Prudenciana Vallejo López de Moreno and José Matías Moreno moved into Casa de López to live alongside other family members. Moreno was the former secretary of state to Pío Pico, the last Mexican governor of Alta California, and former captain in the Mexican army during the U.S.-Mexico War.

It was thought that Father Antonio D. Ubach, a Roman Catholic priest, resided in Casa de López after 1866. Ubach was said to have served as the model for the “Father Gaspar” in Helen Hunt Jackson’s novel, Ramona.

In the 1860s and 1870s, New Town (now downtown) became the civic and commercial hub of San Diego, leading to the gradual decline of Old Town. In 1872, a fire gutted the plaza and, one by one, landmarks began to disappear.

José Dolorez López (1852-1917) was one of the last people to live in the house.

== Historic Preservation ==
The 1910 restoration of nearby Casa de Estudillo by architect Hazel Wood Waterman led to the gradual revival of Old Town. Advertised as “Ramona’s Marriage Place,” a setting in Helen Hunt Jackson’s bestselling novel, Ramona, the Casa de Estudillo became a popular tourist destination. It fed into a myth about Mexican-era life and culture that was enthusiastically embraced by both Anglos and Californios.

The sesquicentennial of the adoption of the U.S. Declaration of Independence in 1926 led to a renewed interest in the historical past. In the 1930s, the National Park Service turned its attention to establishing national monuments and listing historical sites. The State of California did the same. Casa de López was officially designated as Historical Landmark No. 60 on December 6, 1932.

As San Diego planned the centennial of Richard Henry Dana Jr.’s arrival in San Diego harbor in 1835, the San Diego Historical Society began to press for the restoration of other adobe buildings in Old Town. Casa de López was briefly converted into a riding club and social center.

In 1938, Alice Fisher, then director of the San Diego Historical Society, purchased the structure to restore it. The outbreak of World War II, however, led to its requisition by the U.S. Army which converted the casa and its courtyard into an anti-aircraft emplacement to defend Consolidated Vultee Aircraft Corp. Weapons, ammunition, and heavy equipment crushed the floors and foundations. Fisher, who was compensated for her loss with other properties, tried and failed to persuade the Secretary of War to restore the house.

By 1952, the casa’s condition had become so bad that the San Diego City Council voted to condemn and demolish the structure unless it was restored. Ardath Flynn, a Midwesterner, recalled sagging beams, crumbling walls, and big holes in the floor. She and her husband Joseph persuaded Fisher that the impending destruction of the building could be stalled until a restoration effort could be mounted. C. Arnholt Smith, president and chairman of the U.S. National Bank, and banker Douglas R. Giddings helped Fisher to form a nonprofit corporation to restore the building.

The $30,000 restoration was completed in 1954. The Flynns bought the building and opened the Old Town Candle Shop which sold handcrafted candles made by a Mexican artisan.

== Demolition and Reconstruction ==
A decade later, it was determined that the new Interstate 5 freeway would be built over Casa de López. In 1964, the adobe was demolished and relocated 50 feet away from its original site. Window frames, doors, and heavy timbers were saved but bulldozers destroyed the thick adobe walls. The casa was reconstructed from photographs and elevation drawings made by the Historic American Building Survey in 1936. The candle shop relocated to the new structure.

In 1984, Dale Wilson, a restauranteur, purchased the house and converted the former candle shop into a restaurant, Dos Amigos. Architect Russell Rex added two new wings for a kitchen, dining room, and cantina, forming a U-shaped restaurant with a canopy-covered courtyard. The project costs surpassed $1 million.

== Today ==
Casa de López, with a current address of 3890 Twiggs Street, is now a restaurant in Old Town, San Diego. A historical marker is on the corner of Twiggs Street west of Congress Street, added by the California State Park Commission.

== Gallery ==
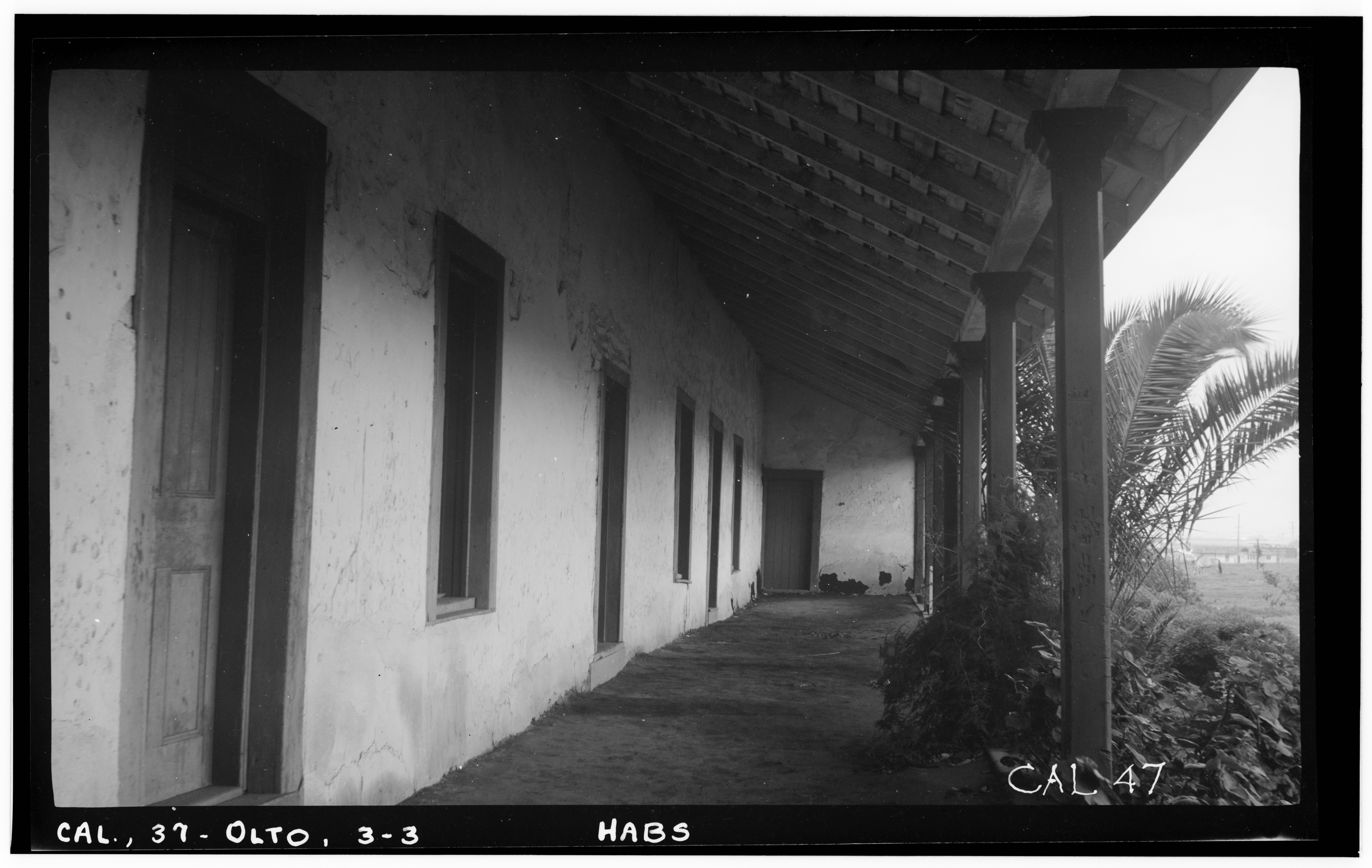
Corridor on north front, La Casa de López, 1936, Historic American Building Survey

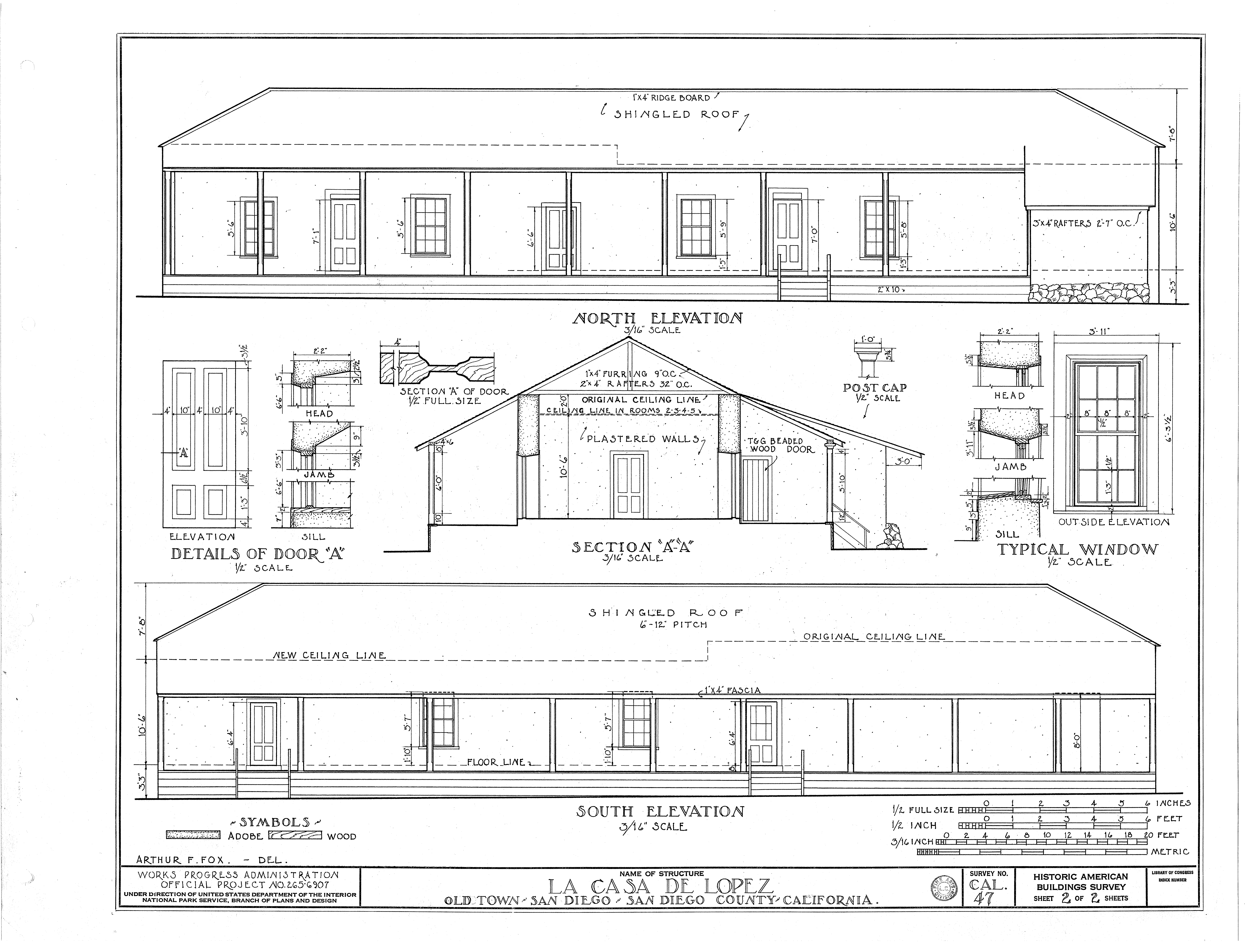
Elevation, La Casa de López, 1936, Historic American Building Survey

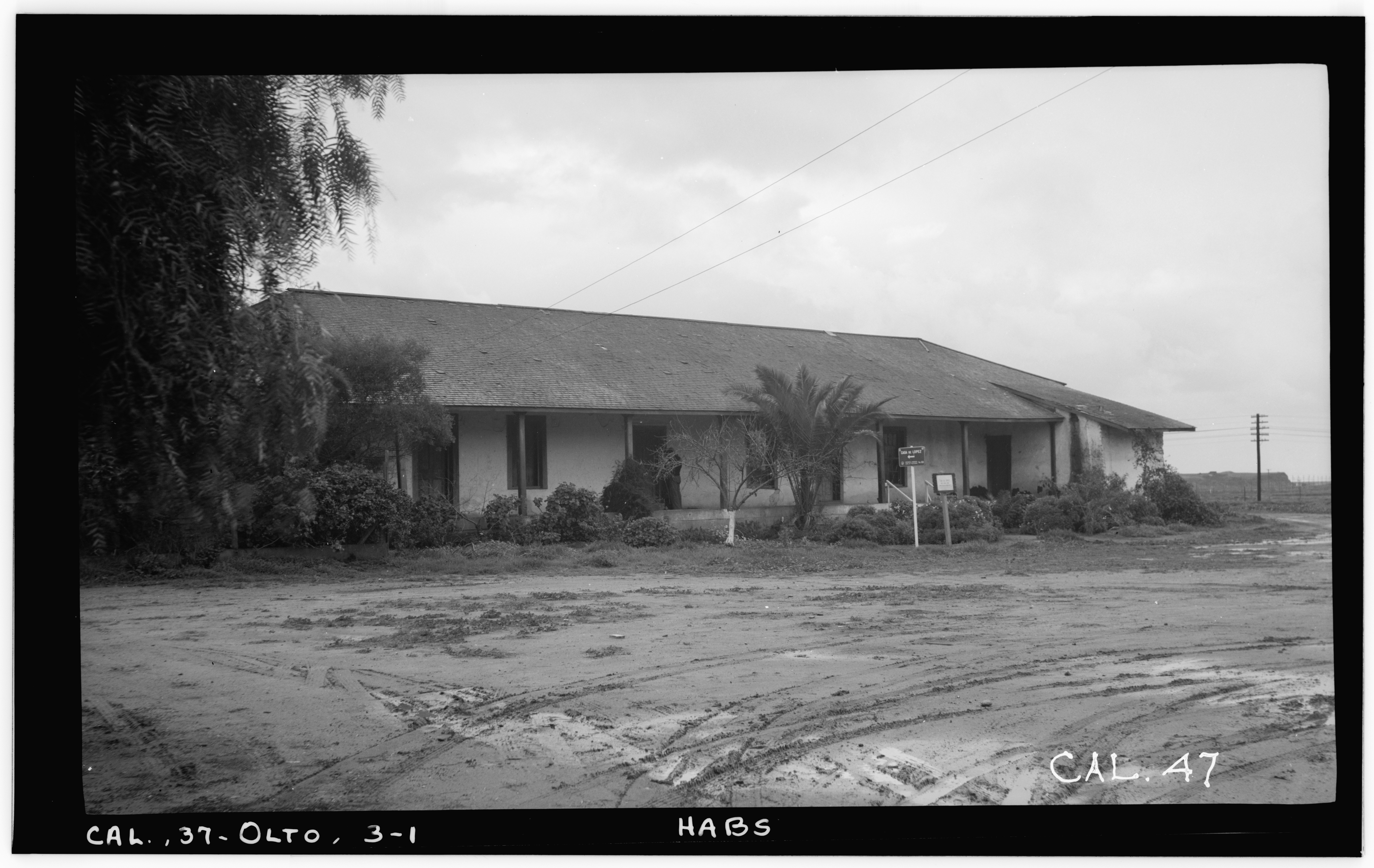
North front, La Casa de López, 1936, Historic American Building Survey

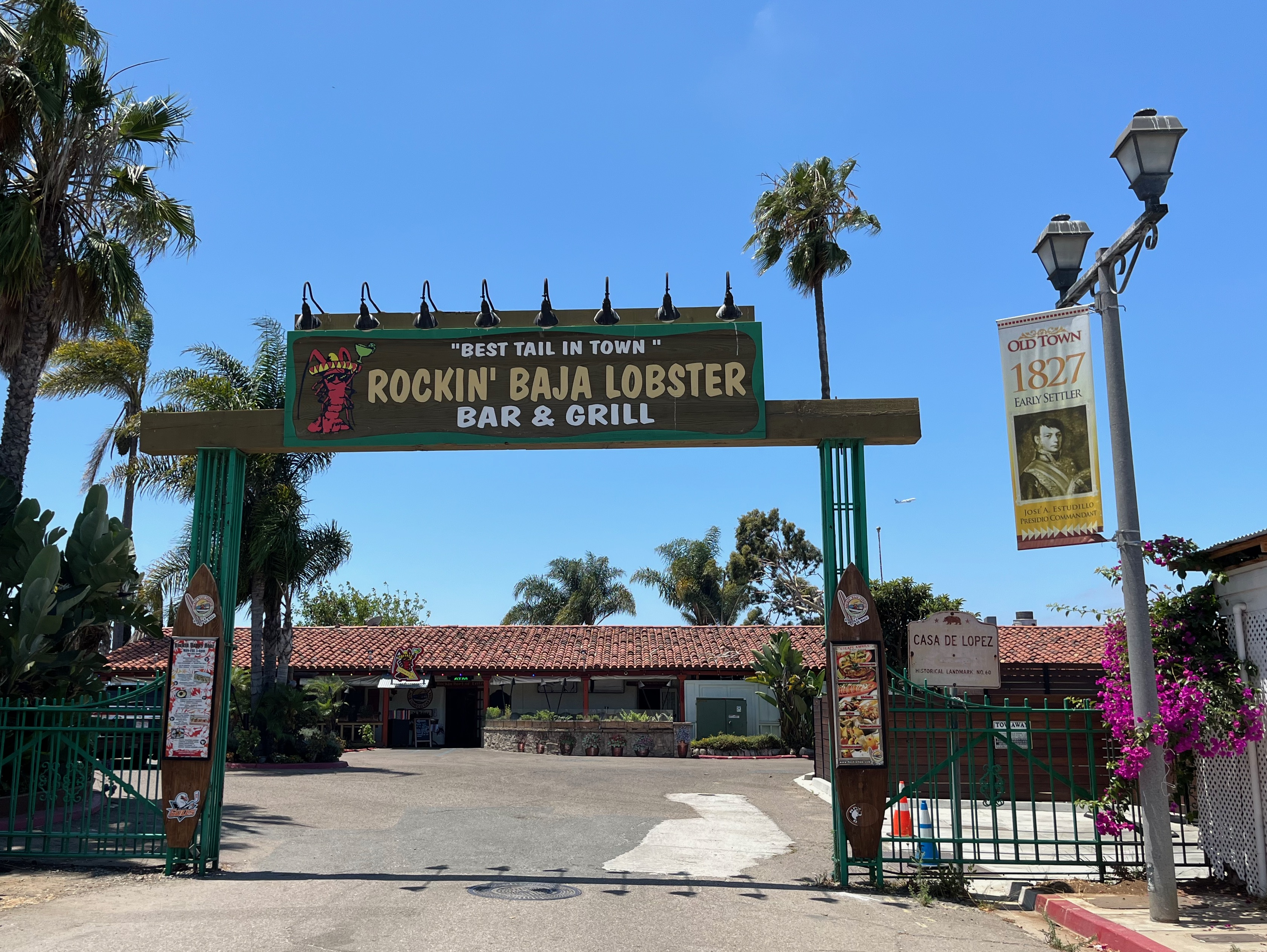
Casa López, Old Town, San Diego, now the Rockin' Baja Lobster Bar & Grill, 2024

== See also ==
- California Historical Landmarks in San Diego County
- Adobe Chapel of The Immaculate Conception
- Casa de Carrillo House
- Casa de Estudillo
- Casa de Cota
- Mission San Diego de Alcalá
- Presidio of San Diego
