= Diva (magazine) =

Magazine

- Cover of Diva magazine (April 2013)
- Editor: Roxy Bourdillon
- Categories: Lesbianism, bisexuality
- Frequency: Monthly
- Publisher: Linda Riley
- Founded: 1994
- First issue: April 1994
- Country: United Kingdom
- Based in: London, England
- Language: English
- Website: divamag.co.uk

DIVA is a European magazine targeted towards LGBTQIA+ women and non-binary people. The magazine contains features on lifestyle and culture affecting lesbian and bisexual women, as well as political developments in the lesbian scene. It also contains articles on travel, music and the latest cinema releases in the sector.

== History ==
The monthly magazine was first launched in March 1994 by Millivres Ltd, under the editorship of Frances Williams.

Linda Riley became publisher of the magazine in 2016.

In September 2021 DIVA announced a new editor, Roxy Bourdillon, who has been with the magazine since 2015. Bourdillon has recruited a dynamic and diverse team to help DIVA truly represent the community it reflects. DIVA features articles by and for lesbians and bisexual women on a range of subjects, from celebrity interviews and in-depth news features, travel pieces and arts reviews. Celebrities including Ellen DeGeneres, Keira Knightley, Samira Wiley and Sarah Paulson have appeared on the cover.

In November 2008, DIVA commemorated its 150th issue with "The Souvenir Issue" which included the cover pages of every issue that had been published in the magazine's history.

As well as a monthly print magazine (also available to subscribe in digital format) the DIVA brand now includes PodDIVA, DIVA Community on Facebook, DIVA Community on Clubhouse, the DIVA Awards and the Visible Lesbian 100 published in The Guardian. DIVA has also previously sponsored the Pride in London Women's Stage in Leicester Square.

In 2020, DIVA launched the first ever DIVA Pride, an online event in light of the COVID-19 pandemic.

The magazine suspended publishing for several months during lockdown, returning to print in November 2020. DIVA is no longer stocked in shops and currently only available via mail order or subscription.

== The DIVA Awards ==
The annual DIVA Awards acknowledge and recognise individuals, charities and brands that support LGBTQI women. The awards celebrate the achievements of LGBTQI women and non-binary people – and their allies – across business, the media, politics and sport. Previous winners include Lauren Jauregui, Sandi Toksvig and Michelle Hardwick, as well as brands such as Disney and Netflix.

=== Categories ===
- Actor of the Year
- Inspirational Role Model of the Year
- Brand of the Year
- Broadcast Company of the Year
- Corporate Ally of the Year
- Diversity Champion of the Year
- Media Personality of the Year
- LGBTQI Network of the Year
- Musician of the Year
- Media Moment of the Year
- Unsung Hero of the Year
- Celebrity Ally of the Year
- Young Entrepreneur of the Year
- Community or Charity Project

== Lesbian Visibility Week ==
In 2020 DIVA introduced the inaugural Lesbian Visibility Week to celebrate and support lesbian, bisexual, transgender, and queer women across the UK and beyond to be their true selves, at home and socially. Research showed that lesbians are almost twice as unlikely to be out in the workplace as gay male colleagues and found that LGBTQI women feel that they are misunderstood and under supported.

== Rainbow Honours ==
Rainbow Honours were launched to "shine a light on those unsung heroes and sheroes: those who strive to make the workplace a better place for LGBTQ employees and those who give up their spare time to volunteer" The first ceremony took place at Madame Tussauds, and was hosted by drag queen Courtney Act and Duncan James. Winners at the ceremony included: presenter Sue Perkins; Mayor of London Sadiq Khan; and activist Sue Sanders, who was presented with the Lifetime Achievement.

== DIVA Box Office ==
On 26 April 2019 DIVA magazine together with Lesbian Box Office launched Europe's first lesbian TV channel.

Shows on the channel include:

- Heather Peace at the Bedford (hosted by Heather Peace)
- DIVA Box Office Exclusive with... (initial interviewee Suranne Jones)
- Power Lesbians (presented by Rebecca Loos)
- Different for Girls

== See also ==
- List of lesbian periodicals
