= Ahead of the Curve (film) =

2020 biographical documentary

- Directed by: Jen Rainin; Rivkah Beth Medow
- Based on: True story
- Produced by: Jen Rainin; Rivkah Beth Medow
- Starring: Franco Stevens; Kim Katrin; Denice Frohman; Amber Hikes; Andrea Pino-Silva
- Cinematography: Svetlana Cvetko
- Edited by: Jessica Congdon
- Music by: Meshell Ndegeocello
- Production company: Frankly Speaking Films
- Release date: June 2020 (Frameline)
- Running time: 95 minutes
- Countries: Canada; United States
- Language: English

Ahead of the Curve is a 2020 American biographical documentary film co-produced and co-directed by Jen Rainin and Rivkah Beth Medow, with music composed by Meshell Ndegeocello. The film is based on the true story of Franco Stevens, one of the most influential women in lesbian history, and the founding publisher of Curve Magazine, a leading international lesbian lifestyle magazine. Portraying themselves in the film are, Franco Stevens, Kim Katrin, Denice Frohman, Amber Hikes, Andrea Pino-Silva, Melissa Etheridge and Jewelle Gomez. The documentary premiered in June 2020 at the San Francisco International LGBTQ+ Film Festival.

== Synopsis ==
The film tells the story about the founder of Curve Magazine, and its rise in the 1990s and its uncertain future today. When Franco was 23 years old, she funded the magazine with a bunch of credit cards. She took the borrowed money from the cards to the race track, where her bets resulted in her continual winning, and that's how Curve was born. During her tenure at the magazine, she helped build a foundation for many movements being led by today's activists in the face of threats to the LGBT community. Now, decades later, her legacy faces extinction and she reassesses her life after a disabling injury, and sets out to communicate and understand the work in LGBT visibility being led by the queer women of today.

== Cast ==
- Franco Stevens as self
- Kim Katrin as self
- Denice Frohman as self
- Amber Hikes as self
- Andrea Pino-Silva as self
- Melissa Etheridge as self
- Jewelle Gomez as self
- Lea DeLaria as self
- Kate Kendell as self

== Production notes ==
Jen Rainin said she originally thought of the film as a drama, but changed her mind after doing the research. Rainin revealed that she was having a hard time finding stories about the women "who really got our movement to this place where we are now", but she still hopes to make the narrative version one day. She also stated there is "a responsibility to tell the story. We just don't know where we came from, where our legacy is, what our lineage is."

== Critical reception ==
Told with a lot of heart and humor, Ahead of the Curve is a fitting and at times moving tribute to the determination, inspiration and entrepreneurial spirit of a trailblazer who helped moved our community forward in terms of visibility and acceptance, helping countless women feel seen and less alone, while providing a great, enduring, magazine.

— The Queer Review,

The consensus among the many reviews is positive. The Austin Chronicle said the film "functions as a historical document...there are contemporary interviews with 'celesbians' both of today and yore, of course, but the doc strikes gold in its incorporation of Stevens' personal archives of queer life in the Nineties". The Spool stated the documentary "is destined to become one of those documentaries queer people can turn to in order to remember where we've been and how we've arrived here together". Andrew Parker wrote in his review for The Gate that, "the documentary is...balanced, historically significant, and [is] surprisingly entertaining...Jen Rainin and co-director Rivkah Beth Medow deftly illustrate and underline the importance of visibility and representation".

Sarah Boslaugh of NewFest said Rainin's cheerful documentary...accomplishes several things at once...it's a history of the groundbreaking lesbian magazine Curve...it's a profile of the magazine's founder...whose nerve, positive attitude, and sense of self are enough to lift anyone's day...and it's a cultural history of lesbians and other gender nonconforming women in the United States from the 1980s to the present". FilmInk praised the film saying it is "told with humor, intelligence and an abundance of personality". The Hollywood Reporter said the film "is by no means flashy, but it's a handsome production that zips along...and maintains an earned sense of celebration and cheer". The film has a 95% approval rating at review aggregator Rotten Tomatoes, based on 19 reviews.

== Accolades ==
- aGLIFF, All Genders, Lifestyles, and Identities Film Festival - Audience award for Best Documentary (2020)
- Image+Nation, LGBTQueer Montreal - Grand Prix du Jury (2020)
- Reeling: The Chicago LGBTQ+ International Film Festival - Audience award for Best Documentary (2020)
- Tampa International Gay and Lesbian Film Festival - Audience award for Best Documentary (2020)
- Connecticut LGBTQ Film Festival - Audience award for Best Documentary (2020)
- Outfest - Official selection (2020)
- NewFest: The New York Lesbian, Gay, Bisexual, & Transgender Film Festival - Official selection (2020)
- San Francisco International LGBTQ+ Film Festival - World premiere (2020)

== See also ==
- List of female film and television directors
- List of lesbian filmmakers
- List of LGBT-related films directed by women
