= AJ Hikes =

American civil rights activist

AJ Hikes, formerly Amber Jelena Hikes, is an American civil rights activist and community organizer who currently serves as the chief equity and inclusion officer for the American Civil Liberties Union. Prior to their work for ACLU, Hikes was best known for their tenure as executive director of the City of Philadelphia's Office of LGBT Affairs, where they led the More Pride More Color campaign, which developed a version of the Rainbow Flag with black and brown stripes to represent people of color. Hikes, who identifies as black, queer, and nonbinary, emphasizes an intersectional approach towards sexuality, gender, race, and poverty in their advocacy.

== Early life ==
Hikes was born in Okinawa, Japan, to parents Jeffery and Zenobia. Their father served in the US military. In their childhood, they lived in Japan, Hawaii, Georgia, Louisiana, and Delaware as their mother Dr Zenobia Lawerence Hikes's career in student affairs flourished. She was vice president for student affairs and dean of students at Spelman College and at University of Delaware, served as the assistant to the vice president for student life from 1996 to 1999, and served as the associate director of admissions from 1992 to 1996. She also was assistant director of admissions and recruitment at Louisiana State University in Shreveport, La., from 1986 to 1992.

After Amber left for college, Zenobia served as vice president for student affairs at Virginia Tech University and was a survivor of the 2007 campus attack. In 2012, Hikes accepted the NASPA's Scott Goodnight Award for Outstanding Service as a senior student affairs administrator on their mother's behalf after her death in 2008.

Hikes plays five musical instruments and was a member of their high school marching band, playing in the Sydney 2000 Olympic Band. Hikes received their undergraduate degree in English from the University of Delaware in 2006. They first came out in their freshman year of college. They later moved to Philadelphia to attend the University of Pennsylvania, where they received their Masters of Social Work in 2008.

== Career ==
Hikes began their activist career as an education access advocate, serving for five years as the local program director for Upward Bound at the University of Pennsylvania. In March 2015, Hikes moved to California to lead the Upward Bound program at California State University, Long Beach.

Philadelphia's Office of LGBT Affairs, under Hikes' leadership, developed this pride flag variant to celebrate people of color in 2017.

Hikes was appointed to lead Philadelphia's Office of LGBT Affairs in March 2017. After incidents in the news highlighted issues of racism within the city's LGBT community, especially in the city's Gayborhood area, Hikes entered city government with a goal of focusing on the marginalized members within the LGBT community. Hikes' tenure saw their rise to international prominence with the introduction of a pride flag with brown and black stripes, intended to symbolize the struggle of people of color in the LGBT movement. The flag was officially flown over Philadelphia City Hall for LGBT Pride Month in June 2017, just months into Hikes’ position, and sparked major public attention and media coverage, both positive and negative. The flag subsequently gained popularity as a symbol of representation for LGBT people of color, including being worn by actress Lena Waithe at the Met Gala and flown at UK Black Pride 2019 in London.

Other initiatives included the LGBTQ Community Leadership Pipeline, which trains community members in leadership for local LGBT organizations. Hikes' office also began the LGBT State of the Union in 2018. During the annual event held in June, the Philadelphia mayor and city government officials, joined by major city LGBT organizations, give short addresses on issues of concern to the LGBT community. In March 2019, the city adopted a new directive on law enforcement interaction with transgender and non-binary people, which required that the city respect a person's chosen name and pronouns in records, as well as providing treatment appropriate to their gender identity in situations such as personal searches and jail housing.

While in city government, Hikes was named "Person of the Year" by the Philadelphia Gay News in 2017, and listed on separate "100 Most Influential People" lists in 2018 by Philadelphia and Out magazines.

In July 2019, Hikes joined the ACLU as the first Chief Equity & Inclusion Officer. They pledged to focus on programs related to workplace culture, professional development, and more equitable employment policies, to empower people from traditionally marginalized communities to enter the organization's leadership.

In 2026, they were a recipient of the Torchbearer "Carrying Change" Awards' Legend Award.

== See also ==
- Ahead of the Curve
