= Safaa El-Toukhi =

Egyptian actress

Safaa El-Toukhi صفاء الطوخي
- Born: Safaa Abdallah Mohammed El Tokhi; August 22, 1964 (age 62); Cairo, Egypt
- Education: Higher Institute of Dramatic Arts
- Occupation: Actress
- Years active: 1979–present
- Parents: Abdallah Al-Toukhi (father); Fathia al-Assal (mother)

Safaa Abdallah Mohammed El Tokhi (born 22 August 1964), popularly known as Safaa El-Toukhi, is an Egyptian actress. She is best known for the roles in the films The Hunter, Gunshot and Kafr Delhab.

== Personal life ==
She was born on 22 August 1964 in Cairo, Egypt. Her father Abdallah Al-Toukhi was a radical playwright who was born on 18 August 1926 and died on 26 February 2001 at the age of 74. Her mother Fathia al-Assal was a prominent Egyptian playwright and activist. Fathia was born on 20 February 1933 and died on 15 June 2014 at the age of 81 following an unspecified health crisis.

== Career ==
She graduated with a bachelor's degree at Higher Institute of Dramatic Arts in 1985. At the beginning, she worked as a writer, influenced by her mother. In 1995, he started to work at the Institute of National Culture.

Safaa began her acting career in 1979 with the television serial El Bahitha. She appeared as a stage actress only in one play El Ayyam El Makhmoura staged in 1999. Then she continued to act in several films, such as El Zaman El Saa’b, El Mohagir, and Bekhit we Adila. In the meantime, she dominated the television screen, where she starred in the serials: Leyali El Hulmiyya, Lan Ayesh Fi Galbab Abi, Mahmoud El Masry. Her most notable television performance came through the serial Qadhiya Rai’ ‘Am with the role 'Yousra'.

== Filmography ==
Year	Film	Role	Genre	Ref.
1979	The Searcher		TV series	
1991	Conscience of Teacher Hikmat	Ekhlas	TV series	
1992	Al Helmeya Nights	Sally	TV series	
1991	Hekayat Elghareeb	Salma	TV movie	
1995	Al Ziny Barakat		TV series	
1996	I Won't Live in My Father's Robes	Fawwzia	TV series	
1997	Bakhit and Adeela 2		Film	
2001	We Have the Following News		Film	
2002	Horseman Without a Horse	Aziza	TV series	
2002	Ayna qalbi	Najila	TV mini-series	
2004	Mahmoud the Egyption	Alia	TV series	
2005	Raya wa Sekina	Mariam Zaki Abdulatif / Mariam Al Shamiya	TV series	
2007	Critical Moments	Azziza	TV series	
2008	Boushkash		Film	
2010	Mama Fi El-Qism	Karam Abdulmohsen	TV series	
2010	Ayza Atgawez	Umm Barqouq / Nancy Al Sayed Faraj	TV series	
2014	Saraya Abdeen	Srr	TV series	
2014	The Hunter	Psychiatrist	TV series	
2015	Jews' Alley		TV series	
2015	Saherat Al Janoub	Bakhita	TV series	
2016	Soqoot Hor	Seham	TV series	
2017	Kafr Delhab	Nawal	TV series	
2017	Abu Al Arosah	Wafaa	TV series	
2018	El Share'A Elly Warana: One Block Behind	Baheera	TV series	
2018	Poisonous Roses	The Mother	Film	
2018	Gunshot	Mahasen	Film	
2019	Weld Al Ghalabah		TV series	
2020	The Prince		TV series	
2020	Khayt Harir		TV series	
2025	Project X		Film	
