= Reeling: The Chicago LGBTQ+ International Film Festival =

LGBTQ film festival in Illinois, USA

Reeling: The Chicago LGBTQ+ International Film Festival is an annual film festival held in Chicago, Illinois, dedicated to LGBT film. The inaugural festival took place in April 1981, and is one of the oldest festivals of its kind in the world.

Each year, Reeling showcases a variety of LGBT-themed films, including both features and shorts. The festival is a production of Chicago Filmmakers, a not-for-profit media arts organization that serves the independent film community in Chicago.

== Films ==
| Reeling Fest # | Dates | Opening Gala | Closing Film | Ref |
|---|---|---|---|---|
| 29 | November 4–13, 2010 | | | |
| 30 | November 3–12, 2011 | | | |
| * | 2012 - Fest on hiatus | | | |
| 31 | November 7–14, 2013 | | | |
| 32 | September 18–25, 2014 | | | |
| 33 | September 17–24, 2015 | | | |
| 34 | September 22–29, 2016 | Hurricane Bianca | King Cobra | |
| 35 | September 21–28, 2017 | Hello Again | Palace of Fun | |
| 36 | September 20–30, 2018 | Freelancers Anonymous | Studio 54 | |
| 37 | September 19–29, 2019 | The Shiny Shrimps | Scream, Queen! | |
| 38 | September 24 – October 7, 2020 | Breaking Fast | Ahead of the Curve | |
| 39 | September 23 – October 7, 2021 | Firebird | The Sixth Reel | |
| 40 | | | | |
| 41 | September 21 - October 8, 2023 | The Mattachine Family | | |
