= Ihsan Kamal =

Egyptian writer (born 1935)

Ihsan Kamal (born 1935 in Girga, Egypt) is an Egyptian writer. She has adapted a number of her short stories for television and film, and her work has been translated into English, Russian, Chinese, Dutch and Swedish.

Kamal is a founding member of the Egyptian Writers' Union. In addition to her literary works, Kamal received a degree in embroidery arts in 1956.

== Awards and honours ==
- The Short Story Club Prize, 1958 and 1960
- The Ihsan 'Abd al-Quddus Prize for Short Stories, 1991
- The Mahmud Taymur Prize for short stories, 1994
- a medal from the Supreme Council for Arts and Humanities in 1974

== Selected works ==
- Sijn al-malika ("The Queen's Prison") short stories (1960)
- Satr maghiut ("A Mistake in the Knitting") short stories (1971)
- Ahlam al-'umr kullih (An Entire Life's Dreams") short stories (1976)
- al-Hubb abadan la yamut ("Love Never Dies") short stories (1981)
- Aqwa min al-hubb ("Stronger Than Love") short stories (1982)
- Lahn min al-sama' ("A Melody from the Heavens") short stories (1987)
- Mamnu' dukhul al-zawjat ("wives are not admitted") short stories (1988)
- Dayfat al-fajr ("A Dawn Guest") short stories (1992)
- Basmat shifah ("Lip Print") novel (1999)
- Qabl al-hubb ahyanan ("Before Love Sometimes") short stories (1998)
