= Fathia Ayodele Karim =

Ghanaian medical doctor

Fathia Ayodele Karim is professional doctor. In 2016, she won 12 academic awards for distinguishing herself in her course of study, breaking and setting a new record at the Kwame Nkrumah University of Science and Technology in Kumasi.

== Education ==
Karim had her secondary level education at the Wesley Girls' Senior High School in Cape Coast. She then proceeded to the Kwame Nkrumah University of Science and Technology where she studied Medicine and was adjourned overall best students during her graduation.

== Career ==
On Saturday 27 August 2016, during her swearing in as a medical doctor by the Ghana Medical and Dental Council, she was honoured with 12 awards out of 15 awards available for excellent academic distinction.
