= Virginie Atger =

French equestrian endurance rider (born 1984)

Virginie Atger (born 26 September 1984) is a French equestrian endurance rider. She won the silver medal at the Individual endurance at the 2006 World Equestrian Games in Aachen.
