= Wim Ubachs =

Dutch physicist

- Scientific career
- Fields: Physics
- Workplaces: Vrije Universiteit Amsterdam

Wim Ubachs is a Dutch physicist. He spent his career at the Vrije Universiteit Amsterdam, where his work in molecular physics and laser spectroscopy used precision measurements on small molecules to test fundamental physics, including searches for a possible variation of the fundamental constants of nature. He is an elected Fellow of the American Physical Society.

== Education and early career ==
Ubachs was educated at the University of Nijmegen (now Radboud University), where he obtained a master's-equivalent degree in 1982 and completed his PhD in 1986 under the supervision of Antony Dymanus and Hans ter Meulen. After a postdoctoral fellowship at Stanford University with Richard Zare in 1987 and 1988, he returned to the Netherlands in 1988 to join the atomic physics group at the Vrije Universiteit Amsterdam.

== Career ==
Ubachs became a full professor of atomic, molecular and laser physics at the Vrije Universiteit Amsterdam in 2003, having directed the university's Laser Centre from 2000 to 2010 and headed its Department of Physics from 2010 to 2014. In 2014 he also started, together with Ronnie Hoekstra, a research group at the Advanced Research Center for Nanolithography (ARCNL) in Amsterdam, studying laser-produced tin-microdroplet plasmas as sources of 13.5 nm extreme-ultraviolet light for lithography. He retired in 2022 and holds the title of emeritus professor, continuing as a visiting fellow at the university.

== Research ==
Ubachs has published more than 400 papers in peer-reviewed journals. He is mainly known for precision spectroscopy of molecular hydrogen and other small molecules aimed at testing whether the constants of nature are truly constant. By comparing molecular spectra measured in the laboratory with the same transitions observed in distant astronomical sources, he and his collaborators have set limits on any cosmological change in the proton-to-electron mass ratio. In 2013 studies published in Science and Physical Review Letters, his group used methanol absorption in a distant galaxy, observed with the Effelsberg, IRAM and ALMA radio telescopes, to show that the ratio had changed by no more than about one part in ten million over roughly seven billion years. The team also used molecular hydrogen absorption in white dwarf stars to test whether the ratio depends on the local gravitational field. In a long-running collaboration with the group of Frédéric Merkt at ETH Zurich, his team substantially improved the precision of the ionization and dissociation energies of molecular hydrogen, providing stringent tests of quantum electrodynamics.

Ubachs has also worked on a number of other topics, including:

- the development of tunable extreme ultraviolet laser sources;
- the study of "heavy Rydberg states", among them a spectrum described as a "heavy Bohr atom";
- the search for the carrier of the diffuse interstellar bands through studies of carbon-chain molecules, and the proposal of molecular hydrogen as a possible carrier;
- photodissociation studies of nitrogen and carbon monoxide using lasers and synchrotron radiation;
- the search for the electron electric dipole moment using barium monofluoride molecules;
- direct measurements of the Rayleigh scattering cross section of gases and of Rayleigh–Brillouin scattering profiles; and
- the generation of extreme-ultraviolet radiation from laser-produced tin plasma for nanolithography.

== Awards and honours ==
- Guest Professorship, ETH Zurich (2002)
- Guest Professorship, Tokyo University of Science (2006)
- European Research Council Advanced Grant (2015)
- Fellow, American Physical Society (2016)
- Special issue of the journal Molecular Physics published in his honour (2023)
