= Frances "Franco" Stevens =

American publisher

Frances "Franco" Stevens (born Frances Rene Goldberg, October 18, 1967) is the founding publisher of Curve Magazine, a leading international lesbian lifestyle magazine, and the subject of the 2021 documentary film Ahead of the Curve.

== Early life ==
Frances "Franco" Stevens is the fourth of five children born to Gloria and Martin Goldberg. She grew up and attended school in Potomac, Maryland. She married Blaine Stevens, a doctor in the US Army, at age 18 and moved the San Francisco's Presidio, where Blaine was stationed. The marriage dissolved in 1989, shortly after Frances came out as a lesbian.

== Founding of Deneuve magazine ==
Stevens and a team of volunteer staff launched the first issue of Deneuve magazine in 1990. Unable to find funding for the then unproven lesbian market, Stevens put up her own money and struggled to convince advertisers that lesbians were a viable market. Within two years, she landed ad buys from Budweiser and Warner Brothers. The full-color, glossy mainstream lifestyle magazine covered national and international news stories, politics, celebrity interviews, style, travel, and trends oriented around the lesbian experience. Deneuve was known for drawing attention to "lipstick lesbians" as some celebrities were beginning to come out of the closet, and for keeping up with changing concepts of gender and sexuality in lesbian culture.

In an effort to build the magazine's subscriber base, Stevens partnered with Barbara Grier of Naiad Press, at the time the largest lesbian feminist publisher in the world. Grier agreed to include Deneuve's subscription form in their newsletter. The magazine garnered a large subscriber base very quickly thereafter. Stevens also appeared on television shows, including CNN and Geraldo, and she took her staff on cross-country tours to grow their readership.

== Trademark infringement dispute ==
In 1995, the French actress Catherine Deneuve sued for trademark infringement. Stevens denied the name was inspired by the actress. On May 19, 1995, a large fundraiser called "Alive and Kicking" featuring many LGBTQ celebrities, such as Armistead Maupin, Marga Gomez, Lea Delaria, June Millington, Jean Millington, and Gretchen Phillips, was held in San Francisco to aid the magazine in covering legal fees associated with the lawsuit.

Catherine Deneuve stated in the Advocate magazine that "They are using my name, and my name is a commodity. You cannot do that."

The case was settled in 1996, and Stevens changed the name of the magazine from Deneuve to Curve. The magazine continues to be published under its new name and has featured Martina Navratilova, Melissa Etheridge, Tig Notaro, Ellen DeGeneres, Lily Tomlin, and the cast of The L Word among others.

== Ownership of Curve ==
In 2010, Curve magazine was acquired by Avalon Media. Stevens stated, "I'm excited to begin a new chapter in my life. I'll be passing the baton of publishing over to the magazine's new owner - Avalon Media - and Silke Bader, a woman who has earned my respect and gratitude for her amazing work in lesbian publishing for the last decade."

Avalon reported Curve's circulation at 52,237 with a readership of 182,831 people.

Stevens helped launch The Curve Foundation after re-acquiring the publication on April 15, 2021 to help advance its mission. Curve magazine is now a non-profit project of The Curve Foundation.

In 2026, Curve is celebrating 35 years under its current name, having rebranded from Deneuve in 1991.

== The Curve Foundation ==
The Curve Foundation launched in 2021 as a result of Franco's journey to understand whether the mission of Curve magazine is still relevant today. The Curve Foundation champions lesbian, queer women, transgender and nonbinary people’s stories and culture through intergenerational programming and community building. The Curve Foundation encourages and supports active storytelling and cross-generational dialogue by supporting journalism in the tradition of Curve magazine, investing in the next generation of intersectional leaders, and bolstering existing community archives as a resource to ensure LGBTQ+ women's culture and history can be known. Founding Executive Director Jasmine Sudarkasa says, "Telling fearless stories has always been the heart of Curve's mission. The opportunity to invest in intersectional queer stories and celebrate lesbian visibility feels fearless in the face of twin pandemics – true to the spirit of Curve and a once-in-a-lifetime opportunity." Franco's path to launching The Curve Foundation is documented in the 2021 film Ahead of the Curve.

In 2024, The Curve Foundation launched U.S. programming in support of Lesbian Visibility Week, celebrated April 22-28 that year. That year also saw the launch of the Curve Power List, a yearly initiative recognizing outstanding LGBTQ women and non-binary trailblazers in North America making social and cultural impact in their chosen fields. Notable Power List members in 2024 included Cheryl Dunye, Imani Rupert-Gordon, Brandi Carlile, and Billie Jean King.

== Queer Women In Sports Day ==
In 2025, Lesbian Visibility Week introduced Queer Women in Sports Day (celebrated on the Saturday in Lesbian Visibility Week), founded by Franco, to celebrate the achievements and contributions of queer women and nonbinary athletes, observed on April 26 that year.

== Personal life ==
Stevens served on the board of directors for GLAAD and was founding board member of the San Francisco LGBT Community Center. Stevens was badly injured in an accident in 1997 that left her permanently disabled. She is now retired and lives in the San Francisco Bay Area with her wife Jen Rainin and their two sons.

== Awards and honors ==
- 2000: GLAAD Media Award for Outstanding LGBT Print Media
- 2005: Dallas Pride Grand Marshall
- 2008: Women in the Arts Jeanine C. Rae Award for the Advancement of Women's Culture
- 2010: National Center for Lesbian Rights Community Partner Award
- 2021: GLBT Historical Society History Makers Award
- 2022: GLAAD Barbara Gittings Award for Excellence in LGBTQ Media
- 2023: NLGJA: The Association of LGBTQ+ Journalists' Hall of Fame

== See also ==
- Lesbian feminism
- Lesbian literature
- List of lesbian periodicals
- LGBT culture in San Francisco
- LGBT marketing
