= The Swindler (TV series) =

- Genre: Telenovela
- Created by: César Betancur
- Directed by: Víctor Mallarino
- No. of seasons: 1
- No. of episodes: 43

Production
- Executive producer: William Correal

Original release
- Network: Caracol Televisión
- Release: 4 February 2010

The Swindler (Spanish: El Encantador) is a Colombian telenovela created by Caracol Televisión, from a screenplay by César Betancur, and directed by Víctor Mallarino. The series revolves around Rolando Castaño (Diego Cadavid), a man who, after finishing high school, decides to begin "negotiating" in a clandestine way to create his own company. In addition to his good physique and his way of speaking, he manages to conquer all the women in his neighborhood, which brings him many problems. The telenovela premiered on 4 February 2010, but due to its poor reception and poor premiere rating, the network decided to take it off the air three days after its premiere. It is considered some more unsuccessful telenovela in Colombian television history.

== Cast ==
- Diego Cadavid as Rolando Castaño
- Juliana Galvis as Luisa Solarte
- Víctor Mallarino as Father Jesús Adolfo Gaitán
- Carlos Benjumea as Augusto Giraldo
- Helena Mallarino as Sandra Linares
- Bibiana Navas as Clemencia Quijano
- Rodrigo Candamil as Marco Benedetti Pombo
- Ernesto Benjumea as Juan Ignacio Solarte
- Ana Bolena Meza as Ruth de Rendón
- Jairo Camargo as Otilio Rendón
- Estefanía Godoy as Magnolia Rendón
- Carina Cruz as Eliana Giraldo
- Andrés Parra as Evaristo Aguilar / David Colmenares
- Jacques Touckmanian as Jairo Giraldo
