= Linda Riley =

British journalist and publisher

- Known for: Publisher of Diva and founder of Lesbian Visibility Week
- Website: www.lindariley.co.uk

Linda Riley is a British journalist, publisher, and LGBTIQ+ rights advocate. She is the publisher of DIVA magazine and founder of Lesbian Visibility Week. She is also the founder of the Rainbow Honours, British Diversity Awards, and European Diversity Awards.

== Career ==
Riley began her career in publishing more than two decades ago as the joint publisher of g3 and Out in the City magazines. She transitioned into the diversity and inclusion space in the early 2010s, launching initiatives including the Global Diversity List, the European Diversity Awards, and the Pride Power List.

In 2016, she became the publisher of DIVA magazine, Europe’s leading publication for LGBTQIA women and nonbinary people. Under her leadership, DIVA has expanded its reach and representation to become a global platform for LGBTQIA visibility and advocacy.

Riley served as a board director of the U.S.-based LGBTQ+ media advocacy organization GLAAD from 2013 to 2019. She is a Patron of the LGBT homelessness charity Akt and anti-bullying charity Diversity Role Models, as well as a House of Stonewall Golden Champion for Stonewall Housing. In 2017, she was appointed as the UK Labour Party’s LGBT+ Diversity Lead by then-Shadow Secretary of State for Women and Equalities, Dawn Butler MP.

She was named Business Icon of the Year at the Icon Awards in 2017 and received a Stonewall Award in 2018. In 2021, she won the Trans Ally of the Year award at the Trans in the City Awards.

In 2024 a documentary film about Riley's life and activism was shown at the first DIVA Film Festival, hosted in collaboration with the Iris Prize. Originally titled Life of Riley, the film was renamed to Life Of Riley: Head Lesbian Of The World upon its acquisition by 5.

=== Lesbian Visibility Week and Advocacy ===
In 2020, Riley founded Lesbian Visibility Week, building on the earlier Lesbian Visibility Day to create a broader celebration of the lesbian identity. She has stated that a key motivation was the increasing marginalization of lesbians within the LGBTQ+ acronym, and a need to assert the visibility of both cis and trans lesbians.

Riley has emphasized that Lesbian Visibility Week is designed to celebrate all lesbians and show solidarity with all LGBTQIA women and nonbinary people. The campaign has since grown into an internationally recognized initiative, supported by organizations such as Stonewall, Mermaids, and Diversity Role Models. Each year, the week includes events, digital campaigns, and surveys such as the largest-ever report on LGBTQIA women's experiences.

=== Identity and Representation ===
Riley came out as a lesbian at the age of 15, an experience she has described as difficult due to her family’s lack of acceptance. She left home as a teenager and has spoken publicly about the challenges she faced, including being told that she would never marry or have children. She later reconciled with her family, who came to support her civil partnership and her role as a mother of two.

Though often described as butch due to her outward appearance, Riley does not self-identify with that label, instead identifying as a cisgender lesbian. She has commented on the underrepresentation of butch women in media.

She has strongly opposed anti-trans rhetoric within some segments of the lesbian community, particularly criticism of trans women. Riley has drawn parallels between the discrimination lesbians once faced and the marginalization now directed at trans people, advocating for a fully inclusive movement.

She has stated that advocacy should come from a place of education rather than confrontation and has urged others in the community to use their platforms to support inclusivity. Despite receiving abuse and threats for her views, she remains vocal in her support of LGBTQIA and especially trans rights.
