= Miguel Vila Ubach =

Spanish equestrian

Miguel Vila Ubach (born 1972) is a Spanish equestrian. He won the gold medal at the Individual endurance at the 2006 World Equestrian Games in Aachen, Germany in 2006.

In 2018, his mount TBO Joy tested positive for a banned substance, salbutamol while competing in the CEI3* 160 at Fontainebleau. Vila Ubach was disqualified from competition and was banned from competing for six months.
