= Fathia al-Assal =

Egyptian playwright and activist

Fathia al-Assal (Arabic: فتحية العسال, romanized: Fatḥīyah al-ʻAssāl; February 20, 1933 – June 15, 2014) was an Egyptian playwright and activist.

== Biography ==
Al-Assal was born in Cairo. Her father did not allow her to receive any formal schooling but she later audited classes at the Screenplay Institute. She wrote plays for radio from 1957 until 1967, when she began writing television dramas.

She also wrote five novels. Al-Assal wrote a total of 57 television series, including:

- Rommanat Al Mezan
- Shams Montasaf Al Lail ("Midnight Sun")
- Hibal Min Hareer ("Silk Ropes")
- Badr Al Budoor
- Hiya wal Mosataheel ("She and the Impossible")
- Hata La Yakhtaniq Al Hob ("So that Love Does Not Suffocate")

She served on the board of the Egyptian Women Writers' Union and on the secretariat for the National Progressive Unionist Party, also known as al-Tajammu'. She was president of the Egyptian Writers Association and general secretary of the Progressive Union of Women.

She received a prize for theatre from the College of Liberal Arts at Alexandria University. She received an award from Arab Television for her drama Hiya wal Mosataheel ("She and the Impossible"). Her work has been translated into Russian, French and Finnish.

She married the radical playwright Abdallah Al-Toukhi. The couple has one daughter, Safaa El-Toukhi, who is a popular actress in Egyptian cinema and television since 1979.

She ran unsuccessfully for a seat in the Egyptian parliament in 1984, 1987 and 1995. She was arrested three times during the presidencies of Gamal Abdel Nasser and Anwar Sadat because of her activism.

She died at the age of 81 after being treated at a military hospital in Cairo following an unspecified health crisis.

== Selected work ==
- Nisa' bila Aqni'a (Arabic: نسأ بلا اقنعة, romanized: Nisaʾ bilā Aqniʿah, lit. 'Women Without Masks'), play (1981)
- Al-Bayn bayn ("It Passes"), play (1989)
- Sijn al-Nisa' (Arabic: سجن النسا, romanized: Sijn al-Nisāʾ, lit. 'The Women's Prison'), play (1993)
- Jawaz Safar (Arabic: جواز سفر, romanized: Jawāz Safar, lit. 'Passport', play (1997), first staged as al-Basbur
- Hudn il-Umr (Egyptian Arabic: حضن العمر, romanized: Ḥuḍn il-ʿUmr, lit. 'The Embrace of a Lifetime'), autobiography, won the State Award for Excellence in the Arts in 2004
