= Antonio Ubach =

American Roman Catholic priest and advocate (1835–1907)

Fr. Antonio Ubach
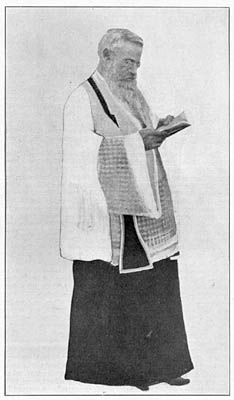

Personal details
- Born: September 1835 Barcelona, Spain
- Died: May 27, 1907 (aged 71) San Diego, California
- Buried: Mission Hills Cemetery (Calvary Cemetery)
- Denomination: Roman Catholic

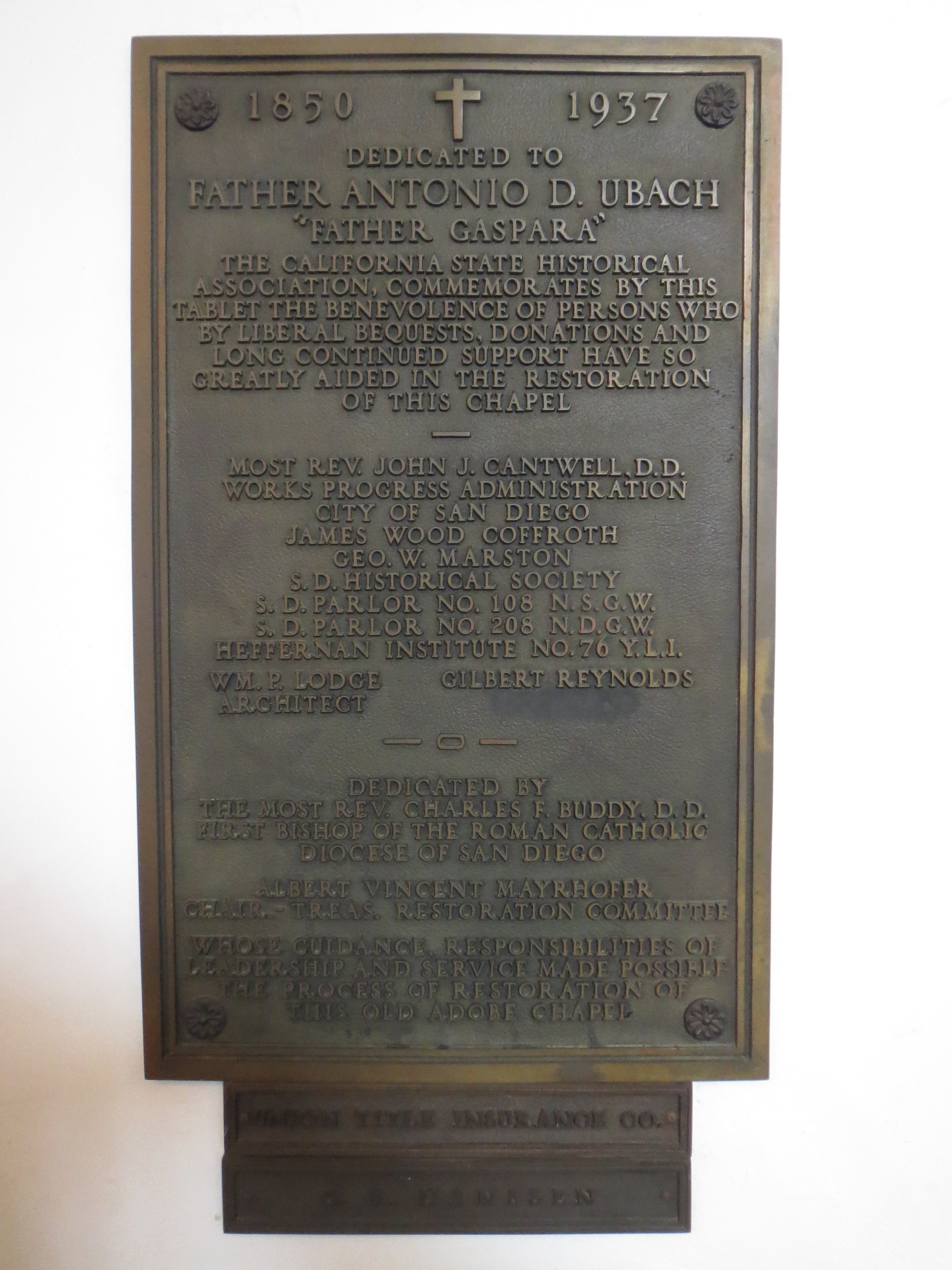
Adobe Chapel of the Immaculate Conception, Old Town San Diego

Antonio Dominic Ubach (1835–1907) was a Spanish Roman Catholic priest and advocate for the education of Native Americans in San Diego, California, during the late 19th century. This was organised through the practice of American Boarding Schools for Indigenous people which were later described by some critics as a way to strip them of their spiritual and cultural identities and assimilate them into white American civilisation.

Ubach, a native of Catalonia, in Spain, was the first priest appointed to serve Mission San Diego de Alcalá after California's annexation by the United States. In 1862, President Abraham Lincoln had signed an order returning the mission lands to the Catholic Church. Presumably appointed by Bishop Thaddeus Amat y Brusi—then the Bishop of the Diocese of Monterey-Los Angeles—Ubach arrived in 1866 to find that the mission had been used by the U.S. military for nearly twenty years, and was in a total state of disrepair.

As soon as he arrived, as well as the restoration of the church itself, Ubach sought ways to provide "vocational training" to the young Native Americans of the mission. At that time, there was no efforts made by the U.S. government for the education of Native Americans, and for nearly twenty years, he had to rely on private resources, mostly the Presbyterian mission office. By the time they ceased to provide aid, a national office of the Catholic Church dedicated to the colonization of Blacks and Native Americans had been established. This office had come about through the work of Mother (later Saint) Katherine Drexel.

For this work, three schools were eventually founded, and were run by the Sisters of St. Joseph of Carondelet, whom Ubach met when they passed through San Diego on their way to Arizona, their first establishment in the region.

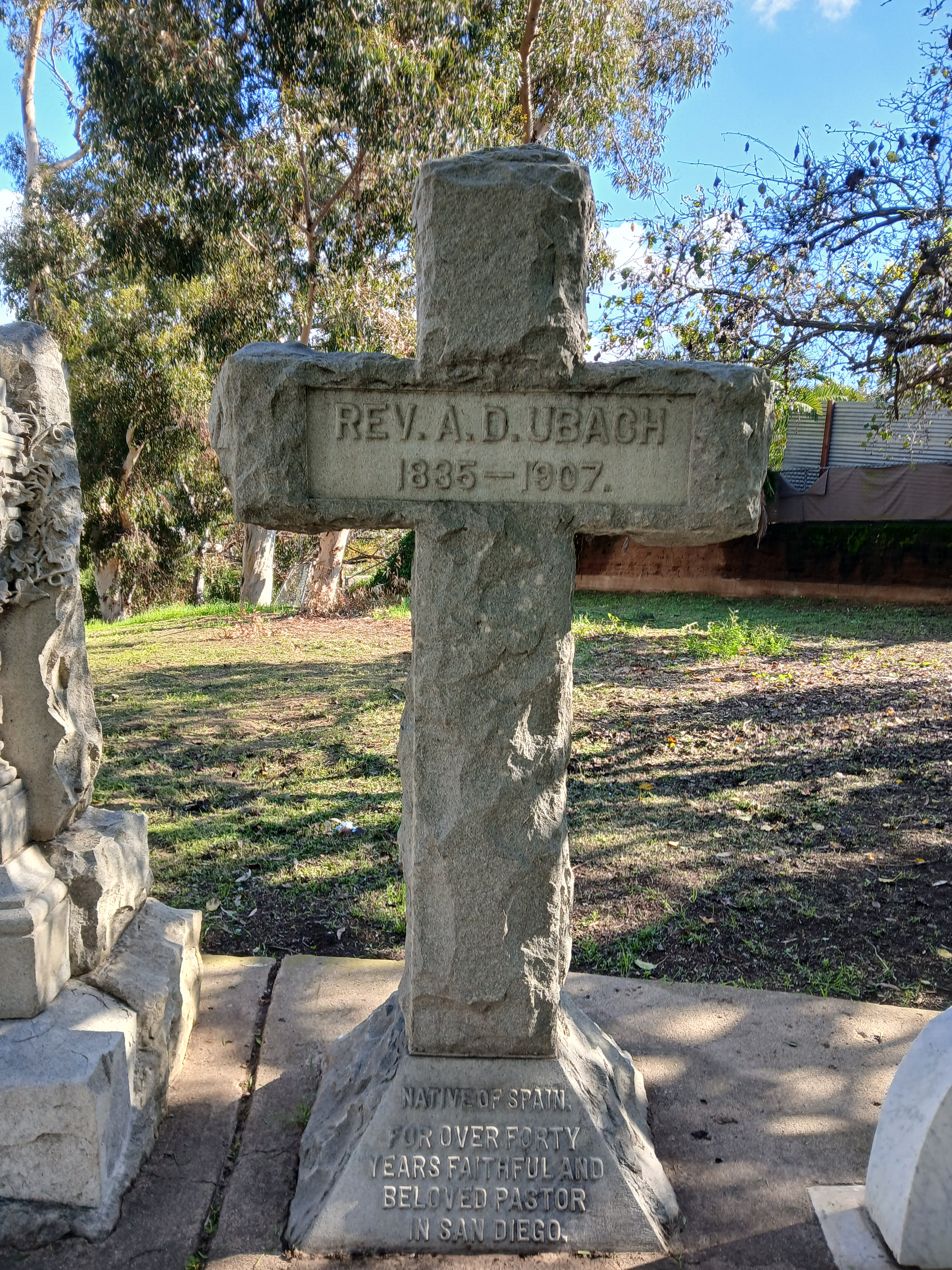
Antonio Ubach's headstone at Pioneer Park

Ubach served as pastor of the mission until his death in 1907.

== Sources ==
- Teresa Baksh McNeil. 1988. "St. Anthony's Indian School in San Diego, 1886-1907." Journal of San Diego History.
