= Encantada =

Encantada (Spanish and Portuguese for "charmed" or "enchanted") may refer to:

- Encantada, Texas, a census-designated place near Brownsville, Texas, US
- Encantada, Mexico, a village in Coahuila, Mexico
- Casa Encantada, a famously expensive estate in Los Angeles, California, US
- Hearst Castle, formerly known as La Cuesta Encantada, in San Simeon, California, US
- La Encantada, a shopping center in Tucson, Arizona, US
- La Encantada, Colón, a corregimiento in Panama
- La Encantada de Villa, a neighborhood in Chorrillos District, Lima
- La Encantada, a silver mine near Coahuila, Mexico, operated by First Majestic Silver
- La Encantada, a spirit in Spanish mythology and legend
- Las Incantadas, a group of Roman sculptures originally in Salonica, now in the Louvre
- Anito, a spirit in Philippine mythology and legend, also known as La Encantada
- Isla Encantada, an island near Baja California, Mexico
- Sierra la Encantada, a mountain range in Coahuila, Mexico
- Ciudad Encantada, a geological site near Cuenca, Spain
- Ciudad Encantada de Bolnuevo, a geological site near Bolnuevo, Spain
- BM Ciudad Encantada, a soccer team in Cuenca, Spain
- Terra Encantada, an amusement park in Rio de Janeiro, Brazil
- Picacho del Diablo, a mountain in Baja California, Mexico, also known as Cerro de la Encantada
- Encantada, a ballet choreographed by Agnes Locsin

== See also ==
- Galápagos Islands, formerly known as the Encantadas
- "The Encantadas", stories by Herman Melville
- The Encantadas, an orchestral composition by Tobias Picker
- Enchanted Moura (Moura Encantada), a spirit in Portuguese mythology and legend
- Lagoa Encantada, a protected area in Bahia, Brazil
- Rancho Encantada, a neighborhood in San Diego, California, US
- Lendas Encantadas, an album by the Brazilian band Apocalypse
- Roca Encantada House, a Heritage House in Buenavista in the Philippines
- Encantado (disambiguation), the masculine form of the same word
- Encantador (disambiguation), the agentive form of the same word
- La Encantadora, DC Comics cosmic entity supervillain
- Erinnyis ello, a species of moth with the subspecies E. ello encantada
