= Enchantress (ship) =

Several vessels have borne the name Enchantress:

- Enchantress, launched in 1802 at Ringmore, became HMS Enchantress (1804)
- Enchantress (1818 ship) was launched at Plymouth in 1818. Between 1821 and 1823 she made one voyage as a sealer to the South Shetland Islands. There the Enchantress Rocks are named for her. After her return to England she traded widely. In 1826 pirates plundered her in the Mediterranean. She was last listed in 1864.
- Enchantress (1825 ship) was launched at Bristol. She was wrecked on 16 July 1835 at Van Diemen's Land.
- Enchantress (1828 ship) was launched at Bristol as a West Indiaman. She then traded with India as an East Indiaman, sailing under a license issued by the British East India Company. She next transported convicts to Van Diemen's Land. She was wrecked in February 1837 at Bermuda.
- Enchantress (1852) was launched from the shipyard of J. C. Smith, Hoboken, New Jersey. She was 450 tons burthen and commanded by Captain William J. Jyler.
- Enchantress (yacht) 19th-century racing yacht, winner of several national and international Cups.
- Enchantress (pilot boat) 19th-century Sandy Hook pilot boat built in 1851 by John Maginn.

== See also ==
- HMS Enchantress – any one of four vessels of the British Royal Navy
