= Enchanters =

Enchanters may refer to:

- Enchanters Three, a set of comic book characters
- Enchanters (Detroit doo-wop band)
- The Enchanters, a vocal group formed by Garnet Mimms in 1961
- The Enchanters, Chicago-based quintet on the Okeh label led by Billy Butler (singer)

== See also ==
- Enchanter (disambiguation)
- Enchantress (disambiguation)
