= Encantador =

Encantador (enchanter; charmer) or Encantadora (enchantress; charmstress) may refer to:

- La Encantadora, DC Comics cosmic entity supervillain
- El Encantador, 2010 Colombian telenovela
- Encantadora (song), 2015 song by Yandel

== See also ==
- La Encantada (disambiguation)
- Encantado (disambiguation)
- Enchanter (disambiguation)
- Enchantress (disambiguation)
