= Enchantment =

Enchantment, enchanting or enchantingly may refer to:

- Incantation or enchantment, a magical spell, charm, or bewitchment, in traditional fairy tales or fantasy
- The sense of wonder or delight

== Books ==
- Enchantment (novel), a 1999 fantasy novel by Orson Scott Card
- Enchantment, a 1917 book by E. Temple Thurston
- Enchantment, a 1989 book by Monica Dickens
- Enchantment, a 2011 book by Guy Kawasaki

== Music ==
- Enchanting (rapper) (1997–2024), American rapper and singer-songwriter
- Enchantment (band), a 1970s R&B band
- Enchantment (Enchantment album), the debut album by Detroit, Michigan-based R&B group Enchantment
- Enchantment (Charlotte Church album), the fourth music recording/album featuring Charlotte Church
- Enchantment (Chris Spheeris album)
- Enchantment, an album by the Celtic folk-rock band Uffington Horse
- "Enchantment", a song by Corinne Bailey Rae on her eponymous album
- The Enchantment, a 2007 album by Chick Corea and Béla Fleck
- Enchanted (Marc Almond album), 1990 album by the British singer/songwriter Marc Almond

== Film ==
- Enchantment (1920 film), a 1920 British silent film starring Mary Odette
- Enchantment (1921 film), a 1921 American silent film starring Marion Davies
- Enchantment (1948 film), a 1948 American film starring David Niven

== Other uses ==
- Enchantment, a type of card in the collectible card game Magic: The Gathering
- Enchanting (programming language), educational programming language designed to program Lego Mindstorms NXT robots
- The Enchantments, an area within the Alpine Lakes Wilderness of the Cascade Range
- Enchantment, a way to improve equipment using magic in the video game Minecraft
- Enchantment (social sciences), technical term used to describe the ways in which people create moments of wonder in the midst of everyday life

== See also ==
- Enchant (disambiguation)
- Enchanted (disambiguation)
- Enchantress (disambiguation)
- Enchanter (disambiguation)
- Incantation (disambiguation)
- Thrall (disambiguation)
- Disenchantment
