= Enchantress (comics) =

Enchantress, in comics, may refer to:

- Enchantress (Marvel Comics), a native of Asgard
- Enchantress (DC Comics), a former superhero

== See also ==
- Enchantress (disambiguation)
