= Legend of la Encantada =

Set of Spanish legends featuring a young woman combing her hair at Saint John's Eve

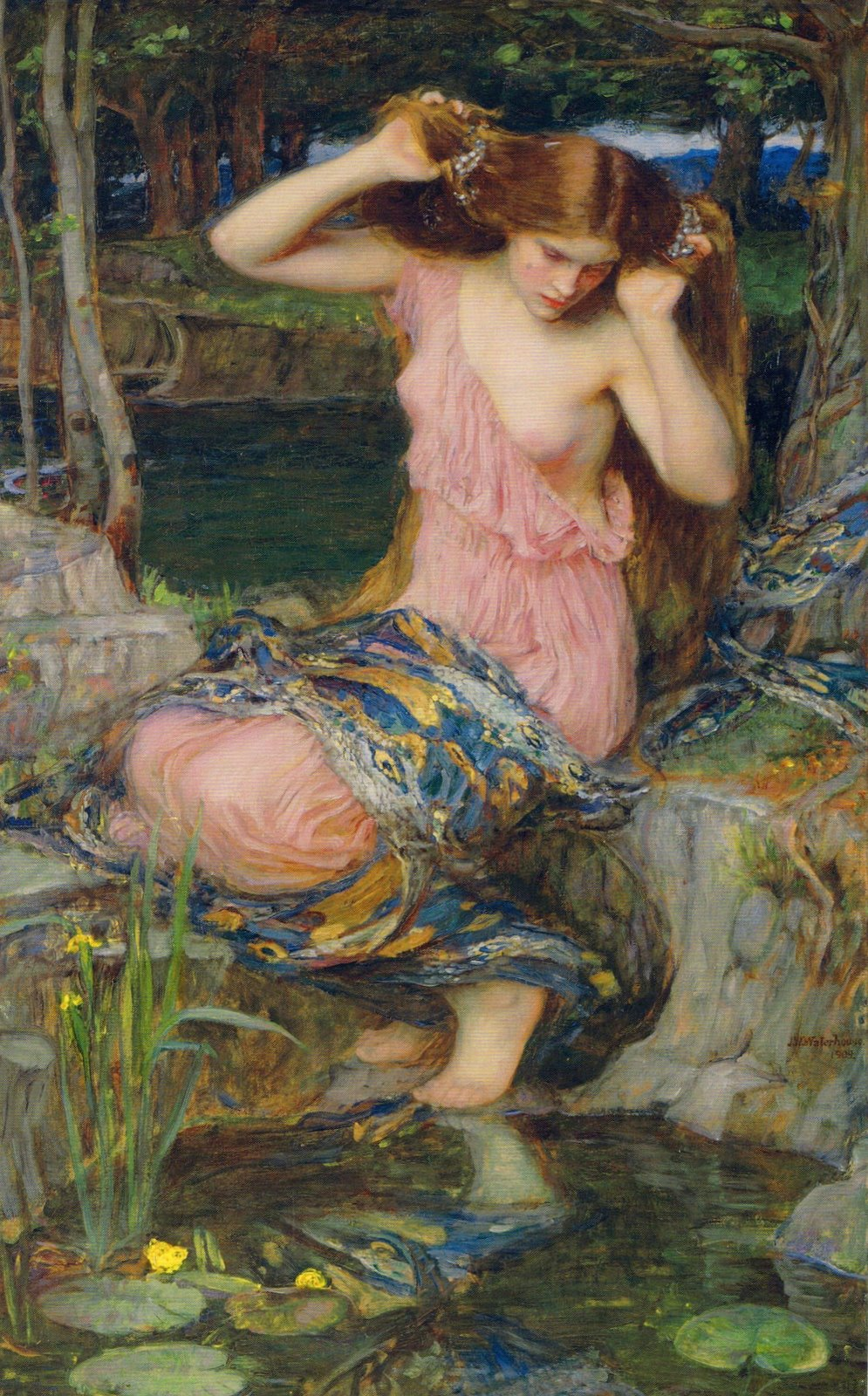
Lamia (version 2) by John William Waterhouse.

The Spanish legend of la Encantada is a generic name that refers to a set of oral traditions and legends mythological narrated in numerous Spanish localities. Although there are multiple local variants, a series of elements are common: the protagonist (a young woman with long hair), the time (St. John's Eve), the manifestation (combing her hair) and other elements (mirror, wedding, comb—generally gold).

La Encantada is supposedly closely related to mythological beings such as the Lamias, Mouras (Galician mythology), Mari and Mairu (Basque mythology), the Anjanas (Cantabrian mythology) and the Xanas (Asturian mythology), In fact, both are, in essence, different versions of the same narrative but adapted to particular cultural environments. Likewise, its relationship with the Mexican figure Xtabay suggests a very ancient and almost universal presence of the myth or a possible Colombian transatlantic diffusion, either through the processes of conquest of America, in the reverse process through the importation of legends of the original American peoples, or being a round-trip tradition.

== Toponymy ==
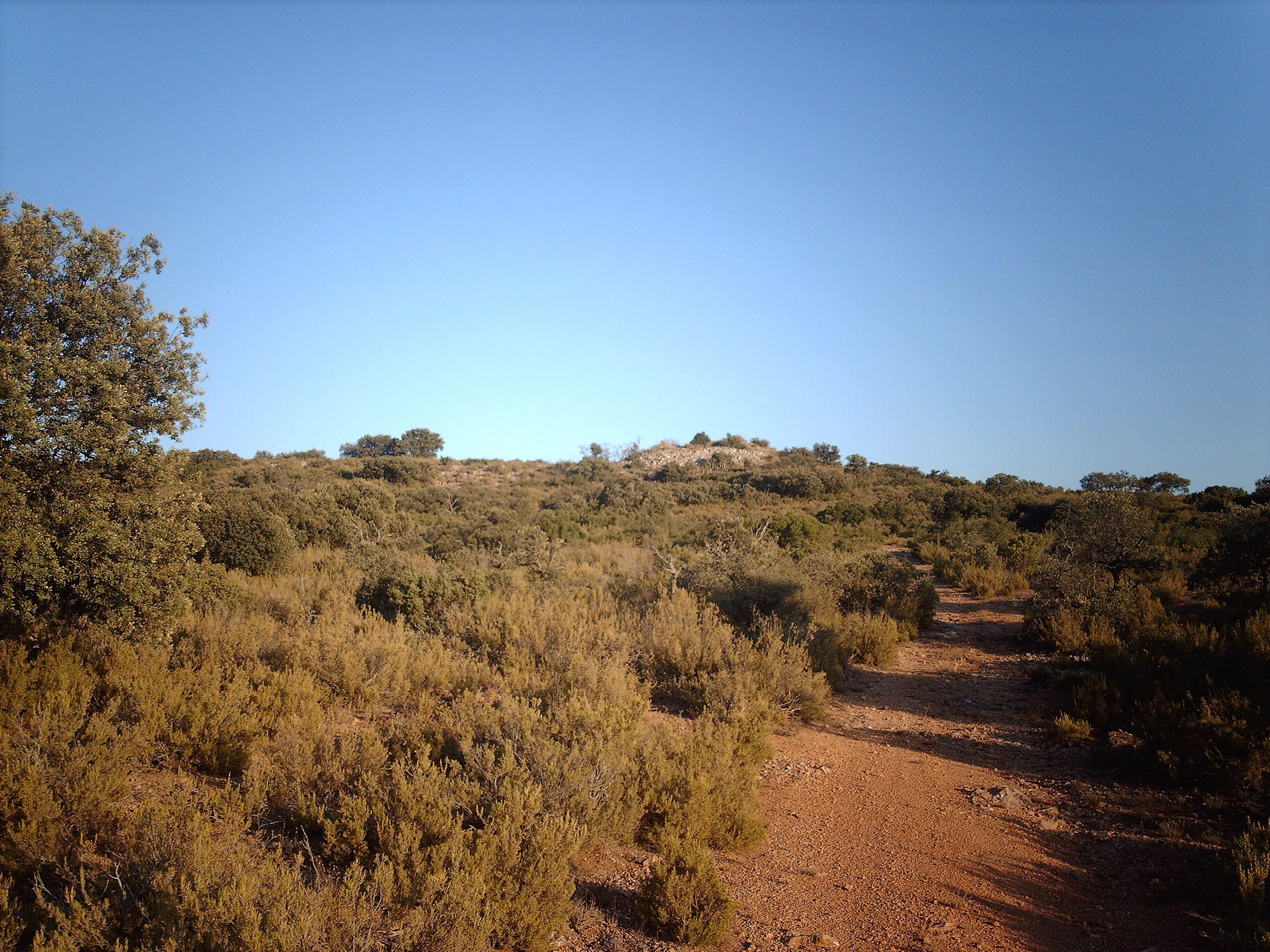
La Encantá micro-reserve Villarrobledo (Albacete)

The term encantada ("enchanted") is quite common in Spanish toponymy and microtoponymy and, normally, designates the apparition. Gálmez de Fuentes considers said toponym as an explanation or a posteriori adaptation of the Pre-Roman term *kanto ("stone, stony shore"). Another parallelism is that, in such places, there are usually archaeological sites, so it is considered a fairly reliable indicator in previous prospecting.

Many times the toponym is presented under the form mora encantada ("enchanted mora"), which may lead to believe that the sites are from the period of the Muslim domination. This is not true, since many of them are earlier and show a survival of cultural substrates that reflect the antiquity and historical memory of the place. The explanation to these supposed moras (which is an adaptation to Spanish of the Galician mouras, which designates the Encantadas of Galicia and Portugal) can be related to the pre-Roman term *mor ("mound, heap of stones") and, in turn, to the morras, typical villages of the Bronze Age of La Mancha. The name of the Basque goddess Mari is not far from these moras and mouras either, etymologically.

== Versions ==
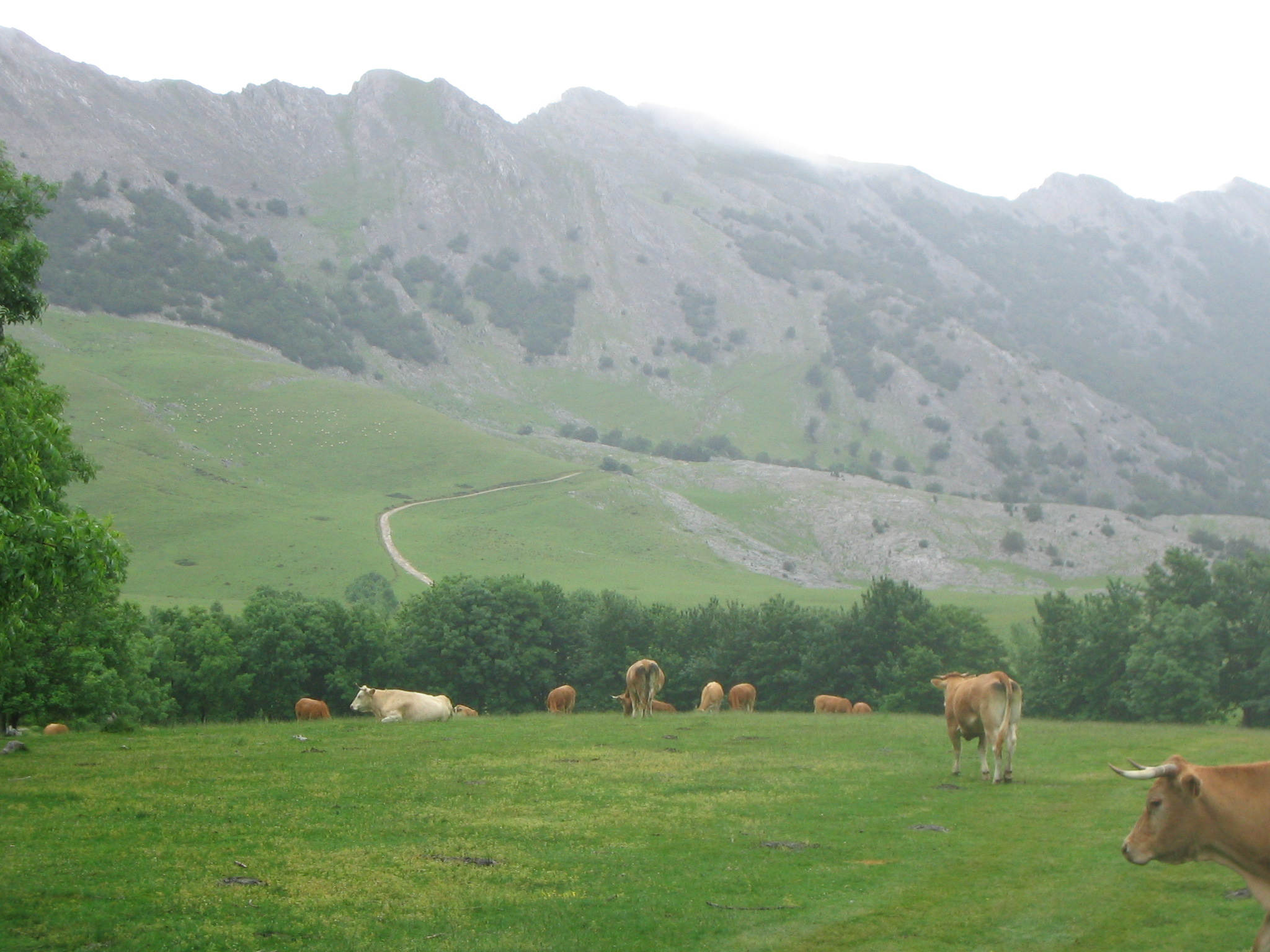
Mount Aketegi

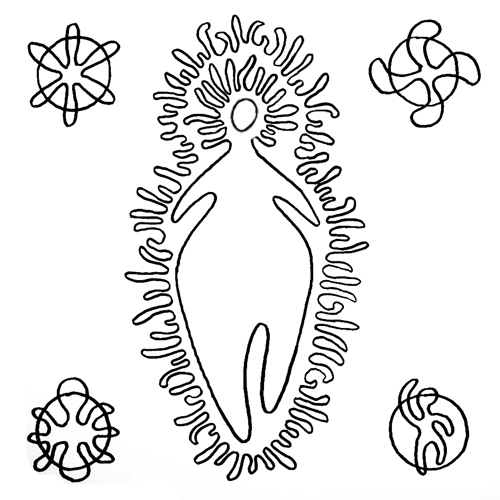
Representation of the Basque goddess Mari.

In essence, the legend narrates the apparition of a beautiful young woman combing her long hair with a golden comb, around Saint John's Eve and in the vicinity of a castle, cave or other natural site charged with strong symbolism. The encounter with it can arouse an enchantment of the spectator, who is generally a shepherd or farmer. Some of the different versions of the myth are:

=== Aketegi (Cegama) ===
A shepherd came one day to the mouth of the frightful cave that opens in the eastern part of the ridge of Aketegi. He had heard that Mari inhabited that dark cavern and that she only let herself be seen when she went out to the entrance to comb her beautiful hair.

— Compiled by José Miguel de Barandiarán

=== Baza ===
In the river of Baza, Granada, about a kilometer from the road of Murcia-Granada, there is a terrera with about forty or fifty caves with several windows, called Terrera de los Argálvez, where the oldest people of the place say that every day of Saint John, a dark-haired woman with very long hair appeared through the windows at sunrise, and year after year the curiosity to see her increased, until one day of Saint John, nobody knows the exact date, at sunrise she appeared through one of the windows of the cave with a comb in her right hand and a dagger in her left hand and addressing a man who was waiting, she said to him: "What do you want: the lady, the comb, the dagger?" To which the gentleman answered: "the dagger". She then said to him: "Well, then, let them pierce your soul with it, because you have enchanted me for so long!"

— Compiled by Antonio Selva

=== Benamor (Moratalla) ===
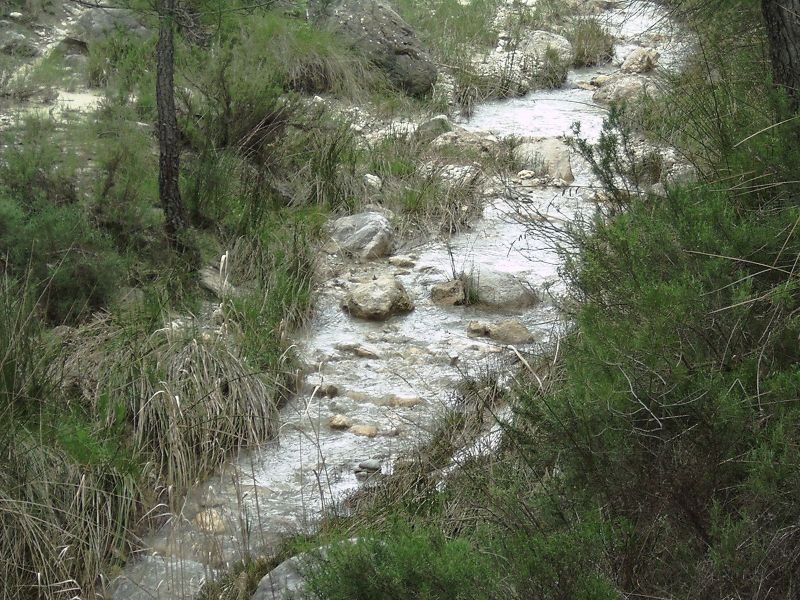
Benamor Stream

In Visigothic times, those lands of Moratalla had woven another love story. When the princess Ordelina was engaged to marry the noble Sigiberto, she broke her promise just before the wedding to marry Hiliberto, his rival. They got married on St. John's Eve, but the marriage was not consummated because at midnight Ordelina died suddenly, her soul being condemned to wander in pain eternally, because of perjury, taking human form only and every year during St. John's Eve, when fate allowed her to leave the grave to comb her long hair in the stream of the Benamor.

— Compiled by Juan García Abellán

=== Coy ===
On the St. John's Eve a Moorish princess dressed in white and with long hair comes out of la Encantá Cave to comb her hair and wash her face in the spring of the Fountain. In the past, people did not go out on the street that night for fear of being enchanted. The cave is located in the Cabezo de la Encantá, where there are remains of an ancient watchtower from medieval times that, together with the castle of Coy, was part of the defensive constructions of Campo Coy.

=== Las Camarillas (Hellín) ===
In the early morning of St. John's Day (June 24), a very white lady with very long blonde hair used to appear at the foot of the Camareta cave, on the banks of the road to the Junta de los Ríos, very close to the Mundo River, sitting on a stone and combing her hair with a golden comb, asking anyone who passed by what they liked more, the comb or her. They say that on a certain occasion a shepherd passed by and when she asked him the question, he answered that it was the comb, and she exclaimed: "Damn you, because of you I will continue to be enchanted!"

— Compiled by Antonio Selva

=== Manzanares el Real. La Pedriza ===
The Cueva de la Mora in la Pedriza, Manzanares el Real (Madrid), is reminiscent of stories that are repeated throughout the Spanish geography due perhaps to the long Muslim occupation. There is another legend with this title, collected by Gustavo Adolfo Bécquer in his Legends, located in the Navarre town of Fitero.

The cave, which is difficult to access, is located near the Giner de los Ríos shelter, specifically in front of its main façade and to the east of the Peña Sirio. It seems that the daughter of a rich Arab fell in love with a young Christian. In this situation she was kidnapped and held by her Muslim relatives inside this cave. Years passed and the Christian knight never returned, despite the longed-for wait by the young woman, so according to the beliefs of the people, from time to time, the soul of the scorned young woman slips wandering among the rock formations and canchales trying to find her lost love.

=== Paterna del Madera ===
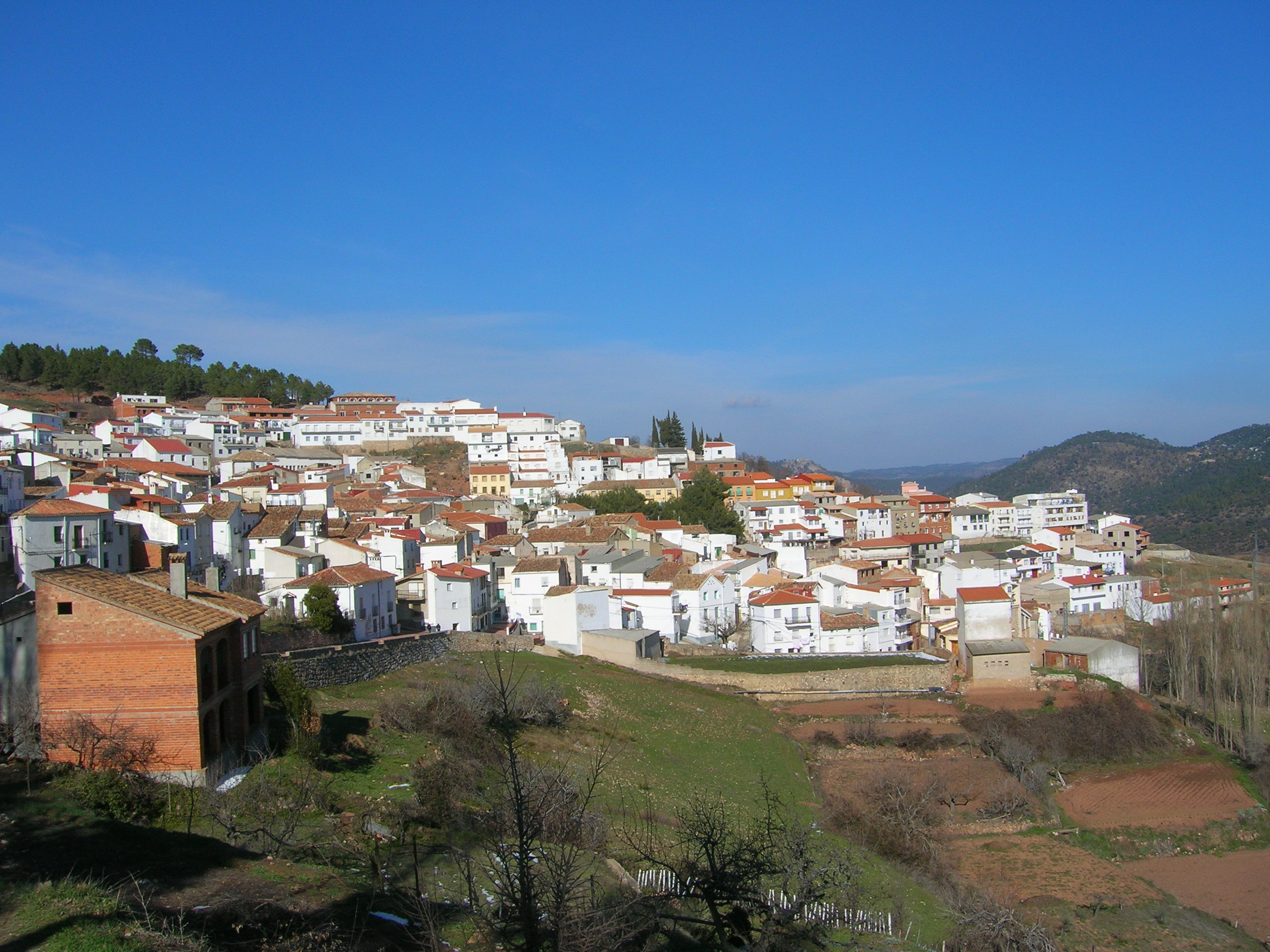
Paterna del Madera.

A cave located between the Madera River and Casa Rosa, known as la Encantada Cave, where in the early hours of St. John's Eve a lady dressed in white appeared, combing her long hair.

— Compiled by Antonio Selva

=== Puerto Lumbreras ===
The story goes that on a certain occasion when it was getting dark, an almost elderly shepherd found a beautiful lady by a weathervane. She called out to him and gave him a choice between a golden comb, which she held in one hand, or herself. The old man chose the comb, and the young lady, lamenting, said, "Alas, you have enchanted me for a hundred more years!" and disappeared in a blaze of light.

— Compiled by Antonio Selva

=== Rojales ===
La Encantá is a traditional legend from Rojales, a village in the Vega Baja del Segura in the province of Alicante. The story goes that many centuries ago, in the Middle Ages, an Arab princess named Zulaida or Zoraida falls in love with a Christian prince, provoking the wrath of her father, the Moorish king, who curses her to live forever enchanted inside the round mountain called Cabezo Soler, next to the Segura river, on the road that goes from the village of Rojales to Guardamar. Every year, and only on Saint John's Eve, la Encantá appears in the Cabezo Soler for someone to free her. If a brave man meets her, la Encantá will ask him to carry her in his arms to the Segura River to bathe her feet and thus break the curse. But for the man who carries her, la Encantá becomes heavier and heavier, not to mention the monsters that come out to meet her, causing the poor brave man to fall faint to the ground, letting go of the princess, condemning her to return to her confinement in the mountain, and in turn burdening him with a curse formulated by her for not achieving his goal: that of dying with his tongue out.

This legend has been remembered thanks to the oral tradition and the novelization of the writer Fausto Cartagena. There is also a play written by Salvador García Aguilar, which was directed with great success by the famous director Alberto González Vergel, and a medium-length film entitled La leyenda de la Encantá, directed by Francisco Jorge Mora García and Joaquín Manuel Murcia Meseguer in 2002, which won the Special Mention in its category at the International Film Festival Cinema Jove in Valencia. Years later, the composer Francisco Jorge Mora García composed several instrumental and choir pieces inspired by the legend of la Encantá ("Noche de San Juan", "Tema de Zulaida", "Batalla en el Cabezo Soler",...).

=== Usanos ===
La Encantada de Usanos is a traditional legend of Usanos, province of Guadalajara. The legend has passed from generation to generation and speaks of a lamia or bewitched and beautiful woman that in the hill of the Castillejo, as it goes from Usanos to the term of Galapagos, has its lair in a cave, from which flows a stream.

On St. John's day each year, the lamia is visible, and she combs her long golden hair with a comb in one hand and a dagger in the other, trying to switch places with any passerby who approaches her on that date. For the spell to occur, it is enough for the passerby to hold the lamia's gaze or engage in conversation with her, at which point the switch of the bewitched person would occur.

This legend has been remembered thanks to the oral tradition and to having been poetized and collected in the book Castilla, este canto es tu canto (Parte II) by the writer Juan Pablo Mañueco, in 2014.

=== Villarrobledo ===
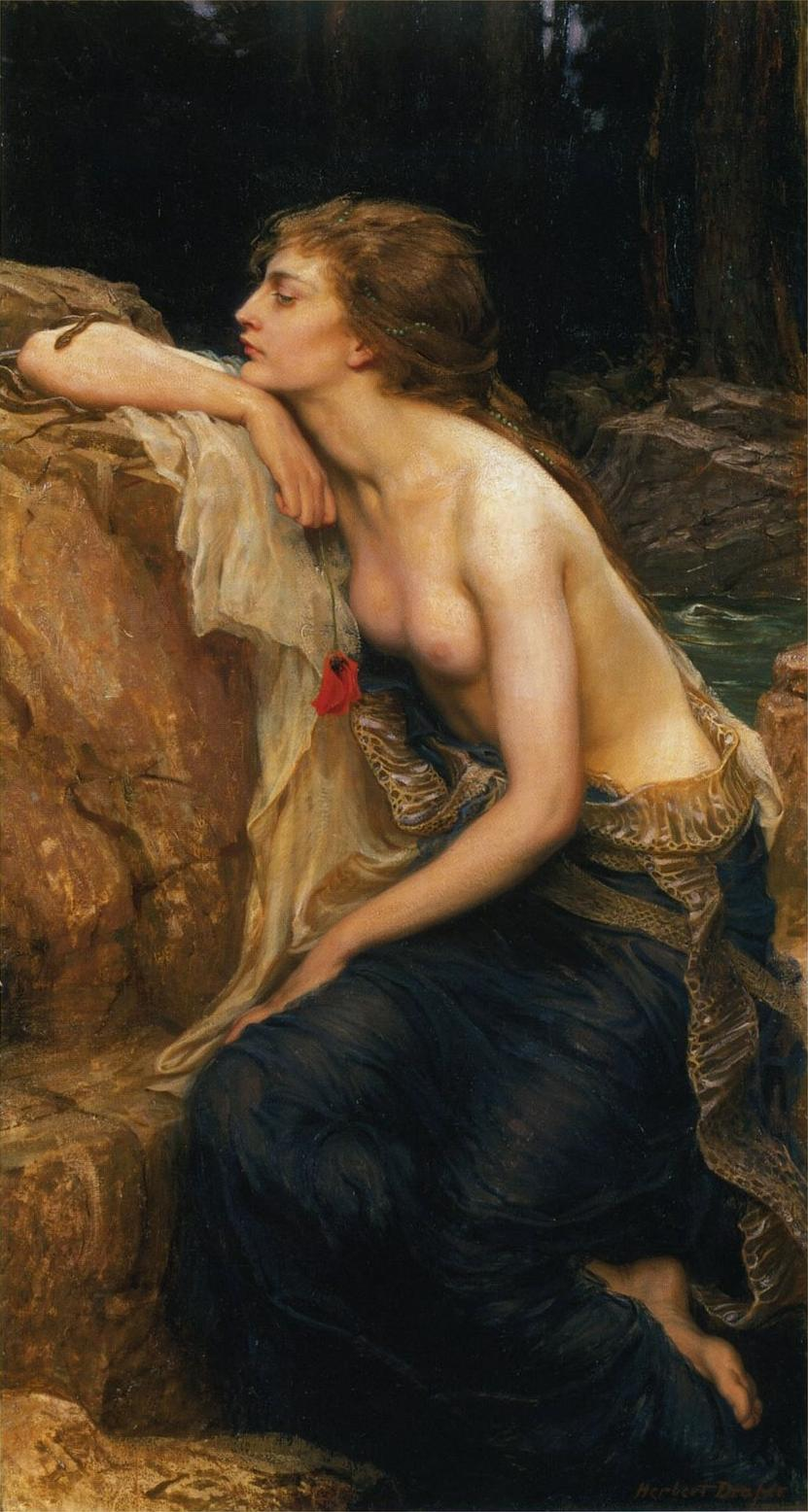
Lamia by Herbert James Draper

In this version, the fundamental elements are present: the beautiful young girl, the curse (or enchantment), the golden comb or St. John's Eve. However, what is peculiar is that it links the legend with reality since, indeed, in the area there is a "castle" and others nearby and "rare flowers that cannot be found elsewhere" grow.

Summary of the text compiled by Elvira Menéndez and José María Álvarez: In the night of times, a young and beautiful princess named Dulciades, daughter of the lord of a castle, is kidnapped by Draskolín, an evil and depraved prince, son of Hastrano, lord of another neighboring castle. The cruel prince kills the princess's aya, who, before dying, pronounces a curse against him. Because of this curse, the prince dies in one of his frequent raids and, as punishment, his father locks the princess in a dungeon. He then orders the witch Nasanta to prepare a poison to kill the princess. When she has given it to the princess, the aya appears and defeats the witch, although that cannot prevent the drink from having some of its effect. She only succeeds in making the princess sleep in a lethargic state until, once a year on Saint John's Eve, she awakens. That night la Encantada, a delicate and beautiful young woman of fair complexion, appears, combing her long and beautiful hair with a golden comb, to water and take care of some strange flowers that only grow there. Other versions of legend add that, if you see her and she looks you straight in the eye, you will take her place.

— Compiled by Elvira Menéndez and José María Álvarez

== Meanings ==
=== General ===
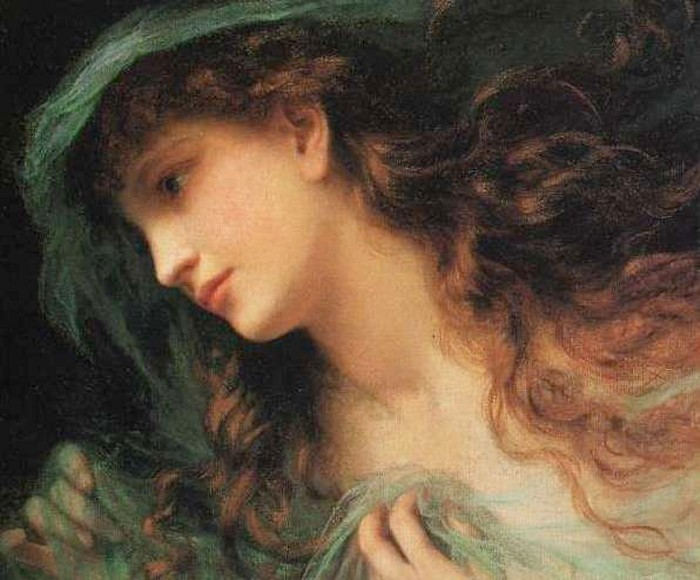
The Head of a Nymph by Sophie Gengembre Anderson

The "story" of the enchanted woman in itself has its roots in a time when the knowledge and the very history of human societies were transmitted in an oral tradition way and reflects manifestations of the past that are difficult to explain nowadays. La Encantada is reminiscent of the nymphs of classical mythology (young female figures of great beauty who appear by the water.) In many of them, one can also intuit the precedents of fairy tales (young girls of great physical and spiritual beauty are enchanted by some evil power and are left waiting for some brave hero to break their spell with a wonderful deed). The similarities between the stories suggest cultural contact, perhaps from prehistory.

In general, the encounters with Mari, the mouras, and the encantadas are not positive for the viewer; although there is a certain graduation between the terrible character of Mari and the possibility of being bewitched or bewitched by the encantadas. Many of the latter give the possibility of salvation for people who encounter them by choosing one, among several objects; although it is remarkable the character of some of them, like the one of Villarrobledo, whose only look (in clear allusion to the Lamias and the Santa Compaña) can serve her to free herself and leave the unhappy spectator occupying her place.

=== Symbols ===
==== Cave ====
Associated with the earth and the underground world, the symbolic meaning of caves has traditionally been related to the mysteries of birth and death. As an entrance to hell or to the world of the dead, they have been used since the Paleolithic as burial sites. But the grottos are also representations of the generating womb of the Mother Earth, which made them the birthplaces of the gods, heros, spirits and other mythological beings. In turn, this confluence of life and death made them ideal locations for the performance of initiatory death rites. Their cross-cultural and intertemporal symbolic importance is remarkable, as Jesus Christ himself is buried in a cave and Orpheus searches for his beloved Eurydice by walking through a cave (Hades).

==== Mirror ====
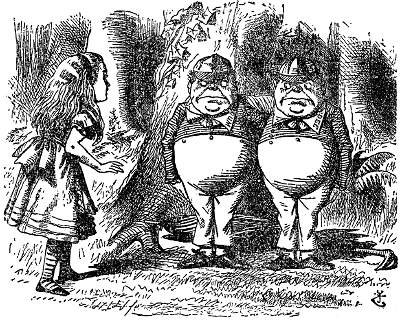
Alice with Tweedledum and Tweedledee

It is related to the Moon, another feminine symbol, and appears in numerous folklore legends and tales of magical and mythological character. It arouses apparition either of the past or visions of the future. Generically the mirror is considered as a door of the soul through which, by dissociation, one can enter another dimension. Mirrors appear and have a great prominence in the work of Lewis Carroll, Through the Looking Glass and What Alice Found There, although they do not appear in all versions of la Encantada legends.

==== Saint John's Eve ====
Spanish magical date par excellence because it is said that the Spanish fairies usually have special predilection for this day. There are a great number of legends, romances, traditions and myths related to June 24, before the arrival of the summer solstice in the Northern Hemisphere (winter solstice in the Southern Hemisphere). It is considered the great night of love, oracles, divination and fertility. Coinciding approximately with the feast of Saint John, since Pre-Roman times, various celebrations have been held in Spain in which fire, in the form of bonfires or luminarias, plays an important role. It has been interpreted that this action was intended to "give more strength to the sun" which, from those days, was becoming "weaker" (the days are getting shorter until the winter solstice). The fact of being ascribed under the invocation of the Baptist is the sign of the ultimate Christianization of a pagan rite that seems to have resisted successive influences of the Roman religion, paleo-Christianity, Muslim and, again, Christianity.

==== Comb ====
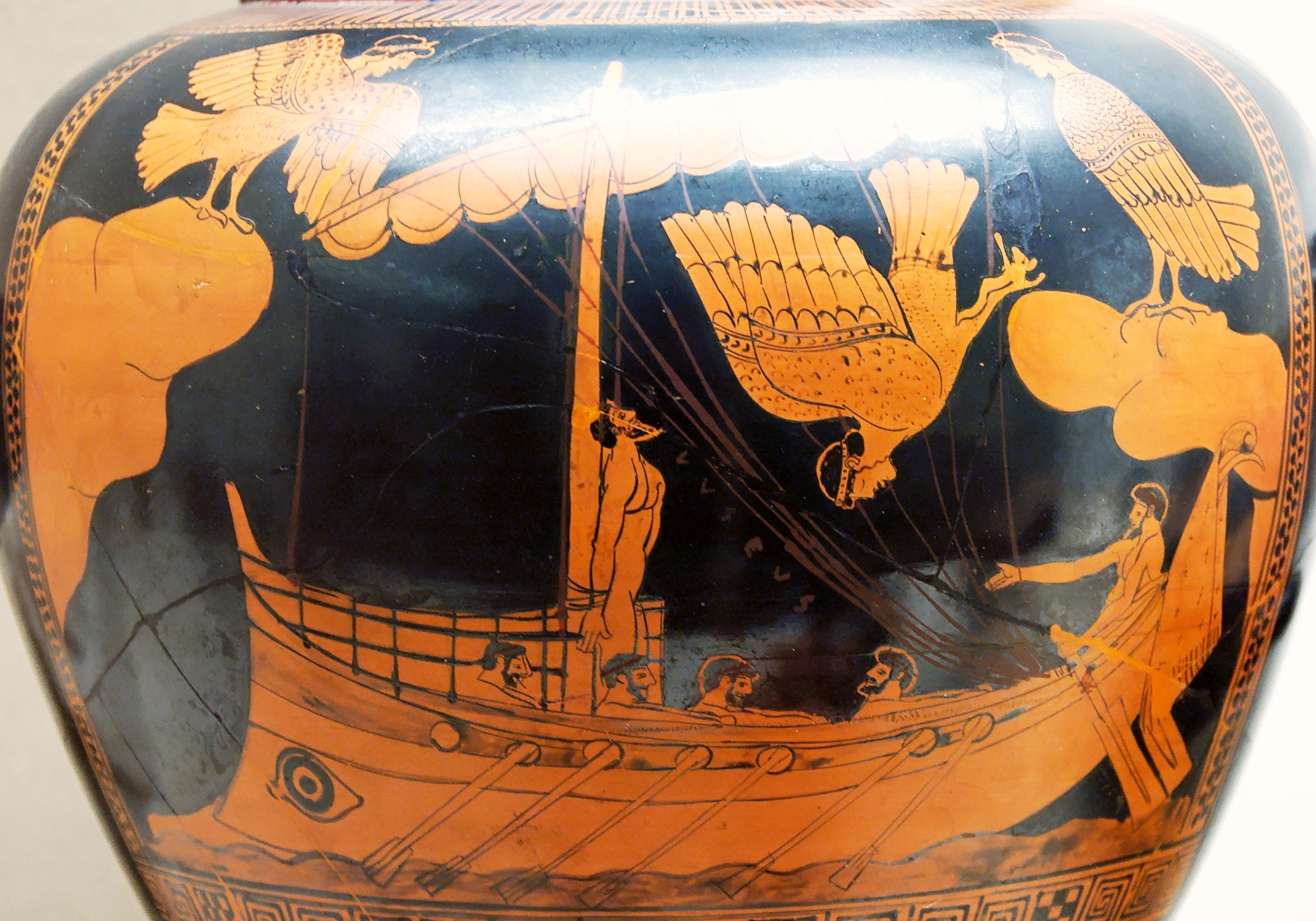
Ulysses and the Sirens (Attic pottery, British Museum)

Anthropologically, the symbol of the comb is related to that of the boat (from paddles). The linear kinship between the two is very great and they represent the mutual penetration of the elements water and fire. The comb is an attribute of fabulous beings of feminine nature, such as lamias and mermaids, the relation of the comb with the fleshy tail of the fish and the consequent mortuary meaning fits.

== Geographical location ==
Being transmitted from generation to generation and being located in places very well known and dear to the locals, it is often thought that the legend is exclusive to each locality where it occurs; however, there are many villages of Spain (especially in the southeast) where, with greater or lesser wealth of details and variants, there were alleged enchanted maidens. This is a non-exhaustive list of places in Spanish geography where the legend has been collected.

List of localities where the Legend of La Encantada has been collected
Municipality	Province	Place	Elements	Location
Almedinilla	Córdoba	Fuente Ribera Site	Every year on St. John's Eve on the banks of the river Caicena appears the spirit of a young Moorish girl desperately looking for her beloved. It all begins when in the Arab Betica love between a Moorish woman and a Christian was impossible. A beautiful young woman used to go down to the river to wash every day, one day she met a young Christian who fell in love with her when he saw her, and a beautiful romance arose between them, which they could keep secret for only a few days, since their brothers soon discovered it and killed the young Christian. When she discovered the corpse of her beloved, she went mad and took refuge in a nearby cave where she spent her last days. Since then, the inhabitants of the place say that in the early morning of St. John's Day, the young woman is seen on the shore waiting to meet her beloved.	
Baza	Granada	Terrera de los Argálvez		37°29′N 2°46′W
Rojales	Alicante	Cabezo Soler or La Encantada Hill		
Barchín del Hoyo	Cuenca	La Mora Encantada Hill		
Caravaca de la Cruz	Murcia	Las Tosquillas		36°06′N 1°52′W
Carrascosa del Campo	Cuenca	Pothole Cave or La Mora Encantada Cave		
Castejón, Cuenca	Cuenca	La Mora Cave		
Cegama (Mari)	Guipúzcoa	Aketegui		
Coy	Murcia	La Encantá Hill		37°57′N 1°48′W
Granada	Granada	La Encantada Cave (Montes Claros)		37°10′N 3°36′W
Granátula de Calatrava	Ciudad Real	La Encantada Hill		
Hellín	Albacete	La Camareta Cave		38°30′N 1°42′W
Horcajada de la Torre.	Cuenca	La Cruz Hill		
Illana	Guadalajara	Promontory at Vega de San Isidro		
Isso	Albacete	Castle Hill (Almohade Tower)		
Moratalla	Murcia	Benamor Stream		38°11′N 1°53′W
Montiel	Ciudad Real	La Encantá Cave		
Montijo	Badajoz	Las encantás Lagoon		
Munera	Albacete	Munera Castle Hill		39°03′N 2°12′W
Narón (moura)	Coruña	Pena Molexa		
Ourense (moura)	Ourense	Monte das Cantariñas		
Paterna del Madera	Albacete	La Encantada Cave (Madera river)		38°33′N 1°20′W
El Picazo	Cuenca	La Encantada Rock		
Puerto Lumbreras	Murcia	Rambla Nogalte		37°34′N 1°49′W
Rojales	Alicante	Cabezo Soler		38°05′N 0°43′W
Sangonera la Seca	Murcia	Mayayo Cave		
Santa Cruz de la Zarza	Toledo	La Encantada Hill		39°58′N 3°11′W
Torrejoncillo del Rey	Cuenca	La Mora Encantada Hill		
Uclés	Cuenca	La Mora Encantada Cave		39°58′N 2°51′W
Villarrobledo	Albacete	La Encantá Hill	Beautiful young woman, long hair, castle, forced wedding, golden comb, strange and unique flowers, St. John's Eve.	39°16′N 2°36′W
Santisteban del Puerto	Jaén	La Encantá Cave	Beautiful young Moorish girl, long hair, castle, silver comb, mirror, St. John's Eve.	38°14′N 3°11′W

=== Location map ===
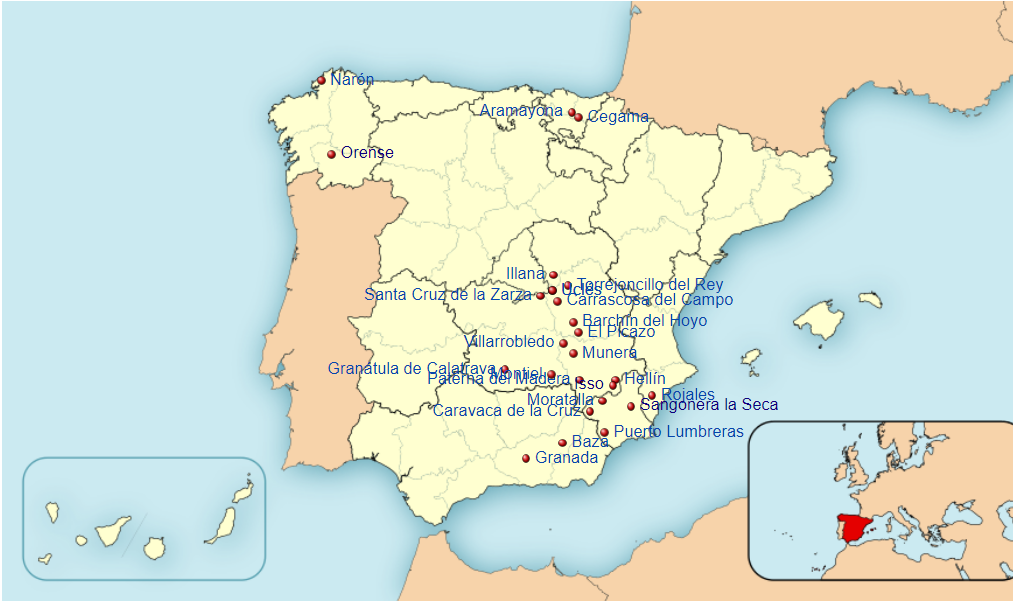

This map shows how the presence of the legend is concentrated, fundamentally, in localities of three specific areas of the peninsula: Galicia, La Mancha-Southeast (Murcia and provinces of Albacete and Cuenca mainly) and Basque Country. Although there are no studies linking the legend to a specific culture or set of beliefs, it is quite remarkable the fact that they coincide, roughly speaking, with places of very ancient cultural tradition: Argaric area, Motillas, Castreña culture, and Basque peoples.

Likewise, quite a few of these "enchantments" are found in neighboring or very close localities (Hellín-Isso, Barchín del Hoyo-El Picazo-Villarrobledo-Munera, Illana-Santa Cruz de la Zarza-Torrejoncillo del Rey-Carrascosa del Campo-Uclés, Baza-Granada, Aramayona-Cegama, etc.) forming in the southeast a very clear ideal axis between the east of Madrid and Cartagena.

== See also ==
- Basque mythology
- Lamia

== Bibliography ==
- Bernárdez Gómez, María José; Guadalajara, Emilio; Guisado di Monti, Juan Carlos; Navares Martín, Alejandro; Villaverde Mora, Fernando (2005). "La mina romana de Lapis Specularis de 'La Mora Encantada' en Torrejoncillo del Rey (Cuenca)" (PDF). Minería y metalurgia históricas en el Sudeste europeo (in Spanish). pp. 243–254. Archived from the original (PDF) on 2018-10-19.
- Menéndez, Elvira; Álvarez, José María (2002). Leyendas de España (in Spanish). Madrid: Editorial SM. ISBN 84-348-8663-4.
- Selva Iniesta, Antonio (1993). "La Encantada de la Camareta: antología e interpretación (revisión del tema)". Antigüedad y Cristianismo (in Spanish). X: 479–488. ISSN 0214-7165.
- Tapia Luque, Sergio (2002). La leyenda de la mora encantada (in Spanish). Guadalajara: Aache. ISBN 84-96072-01-0.
