= Enchant =

Enchant may refer to:

- Performing an incantation
- Enchant (band), a progressive rock band
- Enchant (album), a 2003 album by Emilie Autumn
- Enchant (software), a spell-checker

== See also ==
- Enchanted (disambiguation)
- Enchantment (disambiguation)
- Enchantress (disambiguation)
- Enchanter (disambiguation)
