= Thrall (disambiguation) =

Thrall may refer to:

- Thrall, a slave in Scandinavian culture during the Viking Age
- The human son of Ríg (Norse god).
- Enchantment (as in the word enthralled), the state of being under a magical spell of obedience
- Thrall (Warcraft), a fictional character in the Warcraft franchise and Heroes of the Storm

Thrall may also refer to:

- Thrall, Kansas
- Thrall, Texas
- Battle Thralls is the term given to races that have chosen to serve the Ur-Quan in the Star Control computer games
- A unit in the computer game Trash
- An undead unit in the strategy computer game Myth video game series
- An undead follower of King Palawa Joko in the game Guild Wars
- Thrall-Demonsweatlive, an EP by Danzig
- Thrall Car Manufacturing Company
- Thrall (metal band), a black metal band from Tasmania

== Surname ==
- Danica Thrall (b. 1988), English glamour model
- Margaret Thrall (1928–2010), Welsh theologian, academic, and Anglican priest
- Robert M. Thrall (1914–2006), American mathematician and operations researcher
- Will Thrall (1873–1963), American conservationist and magazine editor

== See also ==
- Thralls (film), a 2004 horror film
