= Enchantress =

Enchantress most commonly refers to:

- Enchantress (supernatural), a magician, sorcerer, enchanter, wizard; sometimes called an enchantress, sorceress, or witch if female
  - Enchantress (fantasy), a female fictional character who uses magic
- Seduction, the enticement of one person by another, called a seductress or enchantress when it is a beautiful and charismatic woman

Enchantress or The Enchantress may also refer to:

== Arts and media ==
=== Opera ===
- The Enchantress (opera), by Tchaikovsky
- The Enchantress (operetta), 1911, with music by Victor Herbert and book by Fred de Gresac and lyrics by Harry B. Smith

=== Literature ===
- The Enchantress, a 1985 novel by Han Suyin
- The Enchantress: The Secrets of the Immortal Nicholas Flamel, a 2012 novel by Michael Scott

=== Film ===
- The Enchantress (Russian: Charodeyka), a 1909 short film directed by Pyotr Chardynin and Vasily Goncharov
- The Enchantress (film), a 1924 German silent film
- The Enchantress, a 1983 Hong Kong film directed by Chor Yuen

=== Fictional characters ===
==== Comics ====
- Enchantress (Marvel Comics), a fictional character in the Marvel Comics Universe
- Enchantress (DC Comics), a fictional character in the DC Comics Universe

==== Gaming ====
- Aiushtha, a video-game character in Defense of the Ancients, called Enchantress
- Magic: The Gathering, a card game with a creature named Enchantress
- Dungeons & Dragons, a game with a female character class called Enchantress
- EverQuest, a game with a female character class called Enchantress
- Shovel Knight character Shield Knight, while possessed by a cursed amulet, calls herself The Enchantress
- Ultima II: The Revenge of the Enchantress, a 1982 computer game

== Folklore ==
- Alkonost, a legendary bird in Slavic mythology, with the body of a bird with the head and chest of a woman
- Gamayun, a prophetic bird of Russian folklore, a symbol of wisdom and knowledge, depicted as a large bird with a woman's head
- Hulder, in Scandinavian folklore, a stunningly beautiful woman with long hair; though from behind she is hollow like an old tree trunk and has an animal's tail
- Lilith, in Jewish folklore, a woman or demon that appears in creation myths; according to one tradition, she left Adam because she refused to be subservient to him
- Melusine, in European folklore, a feminine spirit of fresh waters in sacred springs and rivers, depicted as a woman who is a serpent or fish from the waist(more accurately from the top of the thigh down)
- Mermaid, in Middle Eastern, Greek and British folklore, a legendary aquatic creature that is a woman above the waist and a fish below(from the top of the thigh down)
- Mohini, in Hindu mythology, the only female avatar of the god Vishnu, portrayed as a femme fatale, who maddens lovers, sometimes leading them to their doom
- Naiad, in Greek mythology, a type of nymph who presided over fountains, wells, springs, streams, and brooks
- Nereids, in Greek mythology, nymphs associated with freshwater streams and springs, could be dangerous to handsome men, as they were lustful and jealous
- Oceanids, in Greek and Roman mythology, the three thousand daughters of the Titans Oceanus and Tethys, each was the patroness of a particular spring, river, sea, lake or pond
- Undine, in European folklore, water nymphs found in forest pools and waterfalls, could gain souls by marrying a man and bearing a child
- Oshun, in Yoruba mythology, a goddess who reigns over love, intimacy, beauty, wealth and diplomacy, she is beneficent and kind, but has a terrible temper
- Pincoya, in Chiloean mythology, a cheerful and sensual female water spirit of the Chilotan Seas that is of incomparable beauty and rises from the depths of the sea
- Rusalka, in Slavic mythology, a female ghost, water nymph, succubus or mermaid-like demon that dwells in a waterway, sometimes luring handsome men to their deaths
- Sihuanaba, in South American folklore, a woman cursed by a god, she first appears as a beautiful woman and lures men into gorges, then they see her true hideous form
- Siren (mythology), in Greek mythology, three creatures portrayed as bird-women who lured sailors with their enchanting voices to shipwreck on the rocky coast of their island
- Sirin, Russian versions of the Sirens, portrayed with the head and chest of a beautiful woman and the body of a bird, usually an owl, later symbolized world harmony
- Succubus, a female demon from medieval folklore who seduces men in their dreams to drain their energy, usually through intercourse, originally had a horrific appearance
- Yuki-onna, in Japanese folklore, a spirit who appears on snowy nights as a tall, beautiful woman with long black hair and red lips, originally portrayed as evil

== Places ==
- Enchantress Rocks, a small group of rocks lying off Elephant Point on the south side of western Livingston Island in the South Shetland Islands, Antarctica

== Vessels ==
- HMS Enchantress, several Royal Navy ships of the name
- Enchantress (ship), several merchant ships of the name
- Enchantress (pilot boat), 19th-century Sandy Hook pilot boat built in 1851
- Enchantress (yacht), 19th-century racing yacht, winner of national and international races

== See also ==
- Enchanter (disambiguation)
- Enchanted (disambiguation)
- Enchantment (disambiguation)
- Enchant (disambiguation)
- Femme fatale
