= Incantation (disambiguation) =

An incantation is a formula of words sung or spoken during a ceremony or ritual.

Incantation may also refer to:

== Music ==
- Incantation (American band), an American death metal band
- Incantation (British band), a group of British and South American music performers
- "Incantation", a song by Loreena McKennitt, from her 2006 album An Ancient Muse
- Incantation, a 1996 album by contemporary Celtic, neopagan singer Sharon Knight
- Incantations (album), a 1978 music album by Mike Oldfield
- Incantations (composition), a 2008 percussion concerto by Einojuhani Rautavaara
- Incantations (Waterhouse), 2015 composition for piano and ensemble by Graham Waterhouse

== Video games ==
- Incantation (1989 video game), a 1989 Nintendo Entertainment System video game
- Incantation (video game), a 1996 Super Nintendo Entertainment System video game

== Other uses ==
- Merseburg Incantations, two medieval magic spells in Old High German
- Incantation, a book written by Alice Hoffman
- The Incantation, a 2018 American horror film
- Incantation (film), a 2022 Taiwanese horror film

== See also ==
- Enchantment (disambiguation)
