= Enchantress (1818 ship) =

British merchant vessel (1818–1864)

History

United Kingdom
- Name: Enchantress
- Builder: Plymouth
- Launched: 1818
- Fate: Last listed in 1864

General characteristics
- Tonnage: 138 GRT (post 1855)
- Tons burthen: Originally; Old Act: 126, or 129 (bm); New Act (post 1836):107 (bm); 1844; Old Act: 164 (bm); New Act (post 1836):154 (bm)

Enchantress was launched at Plymouth in 1818. Between 1821 and 1823 she made one voyage as a sealer to the South Shetland Islands. There the Enchantress Rocks are named for her. After her return to England she traded widely. In 1826 pirates plundered her in the Mediterranean. She was last listed in 1864.

== Career ==
Enchantress first appeared in Lloyd's Register (LR) in 1818 with B.Roberts, master and owner, and trade Plymouth–Straits.

On 23 May 1821, Enchantress, Roberts, master, was sailing from Sunderland to Plymouth when she ran on shore, near Devil's Point, Devon. She was expected to be got off.

LR for 1821 showed Enchantress's master changing from B. Roberts to W. Bonds, and her trade from Plymouth–Straits to Plymouth–South Seas.

News of the discovery of the South Shetland Islands and a new sealing ground there had just reached England so Enchantress's owners decided to send her there. Captain William Bond sailed in 1821. On this voyage Enchantress, Bond, master, visited the Falkland and South Shetland Islands. She moored in New Plymouth and Clothier Harbour.

Henry had left the islands on 3 February 1822. When she arrived at Plymouth on 12 May, she reported on which vessels were still there. One was Enchantress, which had taken some 300 seals. Beaufoy arrived at London in July and she reported that Enchantress was still in the New South Shetlands.

The Enchantress Rocks (62.7°S 60.8167°W) are named for her.

On 10 February 1823, Enchantress arrived at Deal from Rio de Janeiro. By 18 February, she was at Antwerp, from Rio de Janeiro. On 7 April she was back at Deal, from Antwerp.

LR for 1823 showed Enchantress's master changing from W.Bond to J.Kissock. On 16 June, Enchantress, Killock, master, sailed for Pernambuco.

In 1825, Enchantress suffered one or more small mishaps. A letter from Elsinore dated 11 November that Enchantress left Elsinore Roads shortly before, but had lost her anchor and some cables. A letter dated Elsinor, 19 November, reported that Enchantress, of Plymouth, Killock, master, had put into Gothenburg having lost her bowsprit, anchor, and cables. Enchantress, Hillock, master, had arrived at Gothenburg from Dantzig on 15 November while on her way to Lisbon, having lost two anchors and cables. On 16 December Enchantress, Kellock, master, was off Lowestoffe, having come from Dantzig.

On 19 September 1826, Enchantress, Kellock, master, arrived at Smirna from Belfast. Ten days earlier a mistico with 30 (or 40) men had boarded her off Zea. They plundered Enchantress of stores and a great part of her running rigging, and clothes and everything portable.

In 1826, Greek pirates plundered 15 British vessels. One of the vessels the pirates plundered was Enchantress, Killock, master, as she was sailing from Malta to Smyrna. They took part of her cargo, ship's stores, and men's clothing. They also cruelly beat the captain and the cabin boy.

Year	Master	Owner	Trade	Source
1827	Killick	A.Woollett	Belfast	LR
1830	Pennington	J.Roberts	London–Genoa	LR
1833	Pennington	Galsworthy	London–Marseilles	LR; large repair 1831
1835	C.Rose; A.Diamon	B.Burnett	Teignmouth–Newcastle	LR; large repair 1831

Enchantress, a brig built at Plymouth in 1818, was registered anew at Exeter and her previous registry was closed on 15 September 1836. At the time Benjamin Bennett owned her title.

Enchantress, ship-rigged, built at Plymouth in 1818, was registered anew at Exeter and her prior registry was closed on 23 April 1841. At the time Benjamin Burnett owned her title.

Year	Master	Owner	Trade	Source
1840	T.Ley	B.Burnett	Teignmouth coaster	LR; large repair 1831
1845	R.Harewood	B.Burnett	Teignmouth coaster	LR; large repair 1831 & damages repaired 1842
1845 Supplement	G.Lodge	G.Lodge	Shields–France	LR; lengthened and large repair 1844
1850	G.Lodge	G.Lodge	Shields coaster	LR; lengthened and large repair 1844
1855	G.Lodge	G.Lodge		LR
1860	A.Leake	A.Leake	Newcastle	LR; lengthened and large repair 1844; new keelson & small repairs 1856
1864	A.Leake	A.Leake	Newcastle	LR; lengthened and large repair 1844; new keelson & small repairs 1856
