= Encantado =

Encantado (Portuguese for "charmed") may refer to:

== Places ==
- Encantado, Rio de Janeiro, a neighbourhood in Rio de Janeiro city, Brazil
- Encantado, Rio Grande do Sul, a city in Rio Grande do Sul, Brazil
- Encantado River, a river in Paraná, Brazil
- Encantado, New Mexico, a community in the United States

== Other uses ==
- Encantado (album), an album by Brazilian dance group System 7
- Encantado (mythology), a mythical river dolphin in Brazilian culture

== See also ==
- Encantada (disambiguation), the female form of the same word
- Encantador (disambiguation)
- La Encantadora, DC Comics cosmic entity supervillain
- El Encantador, Colombian telenovela
