= Will Thrall =

American conservationist in southern California

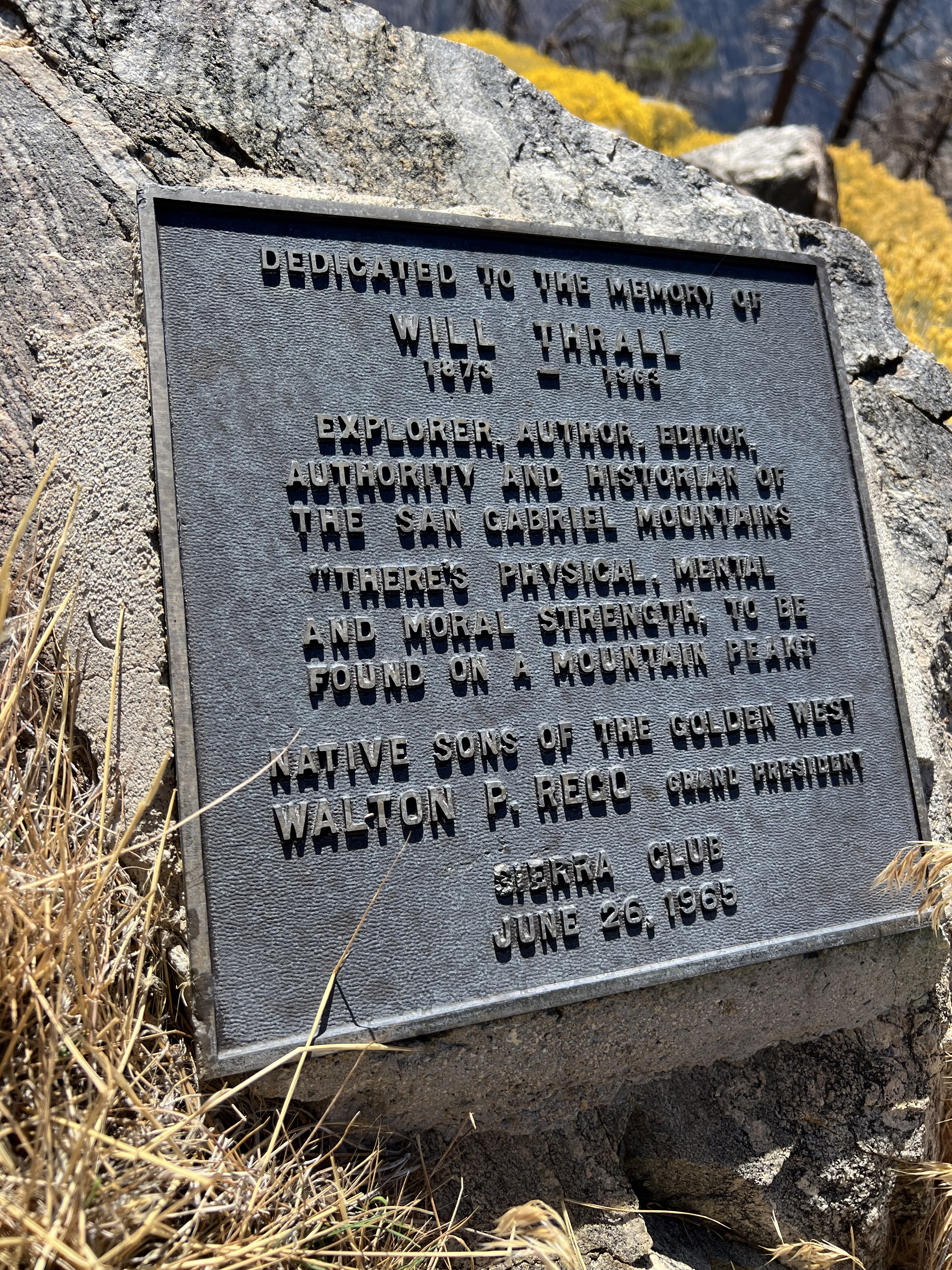
Plaque dedicated to the memory of Will Thrall on the summit of Will Thrall Peak.

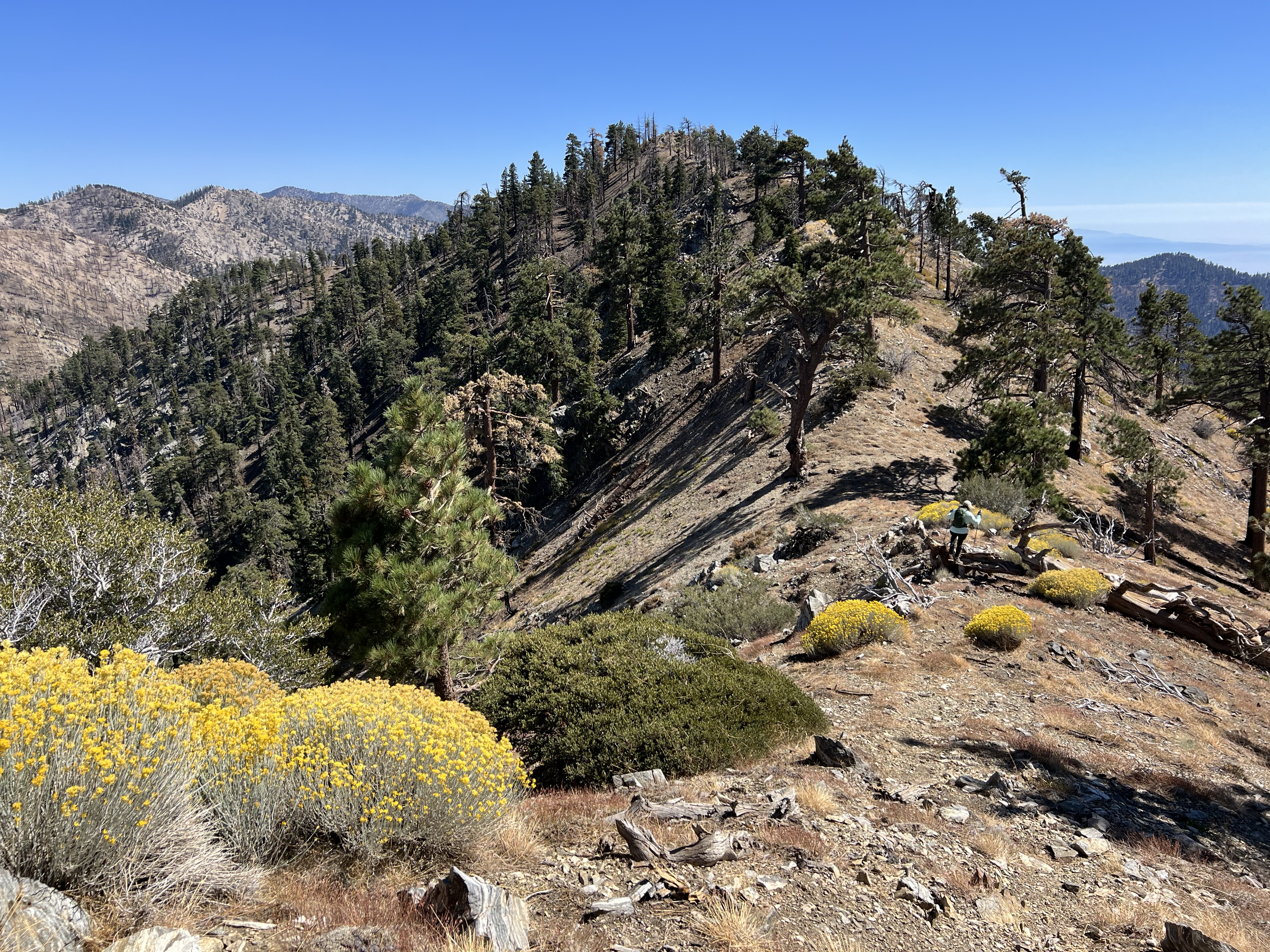
Will Thrall Peak in the San Gabriel Mountain Range in California.

William Henry Thrall, editor and conservationist, was born in Guilford, New Haven County, Connecticut on September 26, 1873. He came to Riverside, California on January 31, 1888.

Thrall became an authority on the trails and history of the San Gabriel Mountains of Southern California. He promoted wilderness conservation, education about the outdoors, and fire prevention.

Thrall married Olive J. Frayer (1880–1952) in December 1898.

== Accomplishments ==
As an authority on the trails and history of the San Gabriel Mountains of Southern California, Will Thrall established the Mountain Information Service to educate the public about the mountains and encourage its responsible use. From 1933 to 1938, Thrall was the Director of the Mountain Division of Education of the Los Angeles County Department of Recreation. He developed an extensive database and telephone network to promulgate mountain information on hikes, road conditions and recreational areas. There was a large and positive response from the public to this resource. During Thrall’s tenure with the Mountain Information Service, visitors to the Angeles National Forest increased by 50% and the frequency of brush fires declined.

Thrall is known as the founder and (from Winter 1934 to Spring 1939)) managing editor of Trails Magazine, a quarterly publication of the Mountain League of Southern California for hikers and campers. It encouraged the use of mountain trails and outdoor recreation in Los Angeles County. It provided information on mountain history, landmarks, trails, and local outdoor organizations.

Thrall believed in the benefits of strenuous physical exercise associated with mountain hiking. He wrote, “There is no exercise so beneficial, physically, mentally or morally, nothing which give so much of living for so little cost, as hiking our mountain and hill trails, and sleeping under the stars.”

Thrall wrote a weekly hiking column titled "Today's Hike" for the Sunday Los Angeles Times from October 21, 1934, to November 2, 1941. He personally checked the trails every week to ensure the directions and trail descriptions in the column were accurate.

Will Thrall was President and founding member of the San Antonio Hiking Club, an organization dedicated to the exploration and preservation of the San Gabriel Mountains. The Club organized bimonthly hiking trips in the mountains. He led the group on three hiking trips after his 80th birthday and was an active member of this group for over 30 years.

== Death and the naming of Will Thrall Peak ==
In the summer of 1954, Thrall suffered a stroke which caused him to give up hiking, lecturing, and driving. He died on February 20, 1963.

A peak in the Pleasant View Ridge area of the San Gabriel Mountains bears Thrall’s name. The Sierra Club and the Native Sons of the Golden West dedicated the naming of Will Thrall Peak (elevation 7845 feet, 2391 metres) in June 1963. The name first appeared on the USFS Angeles Forest Map in 1963.

A dedication ceremony for Thrall’s cenotaph, installed at the summit of what is now Will Thrall Peak, was held on June 25, 1965. His widow attended the ceremony, along with Colonel C. Burton Thrall of Crestline, California, Will Thrall’s cousin, other members of the Thrall family, their friends, and others. After the short ceremony the hikers carried the plaque and mortar to the summit. The Native Sons of the Golden West had gathered water from the 21 missions of California with which to mix the mortar. The plaque reads as follows:

Dedicated to the Memory of
WILL THRALL
1873-1963
Explorer, author, editor,
Authority and historian of
The San Gabriel Mountains
“There’s physical, mental,
And moral strength, to be
Found on a mountain peak.”
Native Sons of the Golden West
Walton P. Rego, Grand President
Sierra Club
June 26, 1965.
