= Enchant (album) =

Studio album by Emilie Autumn
- Released: February 26, 2003
- Genre: Synth-pop; baroque pop; dark cabaret; space pop
- Length: 64:03
- Label: Traitor Records/Trisol Music Group

Emilie Autumn chronology
By the Sword (2001)	Enchant (2003)	Opheliac (2006)

Professional ratings
Review scores
Source	Rating
Allmusic	3.5/5 stars

Enchant is the debut studio album by Emilie Autumn, originally released on February 26, 2003, (Note: While Autumn's official site lists the release date as 2002, newsletters published by Autumn, her interview with Musical Discoveries and the original Traitor Records website point to the release date as February 26, 2003, with a free download of the complete album offered in January 2003.) by Traitor Records and re-released on August 17, 2007 by Trisol Music Group. The original release also included the Enchant Puzzle.

The album was preceded by the EP Chambermaid in place of a single release.

== Background and lyrics ==
Autumn has characterized Enchant, much of which was written in her teen years, as a "fantasy rock" concept album, dealing with the supernatural realm and its influence on the real world, as well as "dreams and stories and ghosts and faeries who'll bite your head off if you dare to touch them." The tagline for the album in much of the marketing was "Once Upon a Time Is Now..."

In contrast to her subsequent album, Opheliac, which is largely based on her personal experiences and relationships, Enchant largely deals with characters and fantasy. For instance, describing the song "Chambermaid", Autumn said, "the song is not necessarily about me as I have never been the neglected and venomous woman that personifies the main character, but I have an overactive imagination and can easily conjure any number of spirits for inspiration." Autumn makes frequent allusions to literature, particularly to fairy tale characters and the works of William Shakespeare. The first few lines of the opening track, "Across the Sky", quote the beginning of Sonnet 53.

Autumn has said that the track "Remember" was written with Annie Lennox in mind, explaining, "not that she would ever care to sing it or that I ever gave it to her, but I wrote the song years ago before I began singing, and I envisioned Annie singing the song as I wrote it".

== Critical reception ==
Charles Spano for AllMusic praised Autumn's range and compared her work to Tori Amos, saying "while less genre variability would serve Autumn's marketability quite well, this misty and boldly theatrical record should please Sarah McLachlan followers, fantasy enthusiasts, and the more adventurous members of Enya's fan base."

== Enchant Puzzle ==
The Enchant Puzzle is an armchair treasure hunt that was included in the original Traitor Records release of Enchant. The puzzle was printed on the reverse of a fold out leaflet and consists of rhymes and pictures. Inspired by the book Masquerade by English artist Kit Williams, the puzzle, when solved, entitles the winner to "the Wings, Ruff, Fan, and Sceptre of the Faerie Queene herself": a set of costume pieces handmade by Autumn. Some fans believe the answer to be a way of contacting Autumn herself, while others believe the puzzle to be purposely unsolvable, although there is little evidence either way. Purchase of the first edition of the album also included access to the now-defunct "World of Enchant", a password-protected website which included, among other things, exclusive remixes, artwork, videos and letters from Autumn. Autumn stated that the treasure hunt began with the release of the album and will continue indefinitely until the treasure is found. The puzzle was only made available with the first edition of the album, and, as of 2021, has still not been solved.

== Track listing ==
All tracks are written by Emilie Autumn.

No.	Title	Length
1.	"Prologue: Across the Sky"	5:10
2.	"How Strange"	3:07
3.	"Chambermaid"	3:14
4.	"Rapunzel"	3:57
5.	"Ever"	6:11
6.	"Second Hand Faith"	4:43
7.	"Juliet"	5:42
8.	"Remember"	5:25
9.	"Rose Red"	5:29
10.	"Castle Down"	3:52
11.	"Heard It All"	3:22
12.	"If You Feel Better"	4:49
13.	"Save You"	4:53
14.	"Epilogue: What If"	4:09
Total length:		64:03

== Personnel ==
- Emilie Autumn - keyboards, programming, violin, vocals
- Graham Brisben - drums
- William Skeen - cello
