= HMS Enchantress =

Five ships of the Royal Navy have borne the name HMS Enchantress:

- HMS Enchantress (1804) was the mercantile Enchantress launched at Ringmore in 1802 that the Navy bought in 1804 as an armed ship of 4 or 14 guns, re-rated as a brig-sloop, and used for harbour service from 1813. The Navy transferred her to the Revenue Service in August 1818. She may have been in service until 1850.
- HMS Enchantress (1862) was a dispatch vessel launched in 1862, became the Admiralty yacht, sold for breaking up in 1889.
- HMS Enchantress (1888) was a dispatch vessel launched in 1865 as HMS Helicon, renamed Enchantress in 1888, sold in 1905.
- HMS Enchantress (1903) was an Admiralty yacht launched in 1903, sold for breaking up in 1935.
- HMS Enchantress (L56) was a Bittern-class sloop launched in 1934, sold in 1945 and renamed Lady Enchantress, broken up in 1952.
- Enchantress was the slave ship Manuela (or Emanuela) that HMS Brisk captured off the east coast of Africa on 10 August 1860, with 846 slaves aboard. The Royal Navy used her as a storeship and she wrecked on 20 February 1861 at Mayotte in the Mozambique Channel without ever having been commissioned.

== Battle Honours ==
Ships named Enchantress have been awarded the following battle honours

- Atlantic 1939–45
- Mediterranean 1942
- North Africa 1942–43
