= Henry (1820 ship) =

History

United Kingdom
- Builder: Plymouth
- Launched: 1820
- Fate: Last listed 1843

General characteristics
- Tons burthen: 1820:43 (bm); 1824:59 (bm); 1837:45 (bm)
- Sail plan: 1820: Sloop; 1837: Cutter

Henry was a sloop launched at Plymouth in 1820. She sailed to the New South Shetland Islands and returned from there on 12 May 1822. Thereafter she sailed between Plymouth or London and Malaga. She had undergone lengthening in 1824, and conversion to a cutter c.1837. She was last listed in 1843.

== Career ==
Henry first appeared in Lloyd's Register (LR) in 1820 with R.Cundy, master, H.Rowe, owner, and trade Plymouth–Saint Michaels.

In 1820 the mariner William Smith, captain of William, discovered the South Shetland Islands. Once news arrived in England of the number of seals there many vessels sailed there to gather seal skins and oil. Henry was one of the vessels sailing there.

Year	Master	Owner	Trade	Source
1821	R.Cundy; Killick	H.Rowe	Plymouth–Saint Michaels; Plymouth–South Seas	LR
1823	Killick; Cock	H.Rowe	Plymouth–South Seas	LR

Henry arrived back at Plymouth on 12 May 1822 from the South Shetland Islands. She had left on 3 February and she reported on the 19 British vessels she had left there, giving the number of skins and tons of seal oil each had gathered. There were also 20 American ships there.

On 30 January 1823 Henry, Cock, master, was off Ram Head, coming from Saint Michael, when she came across the rigging, etc. of a schooner. The schooner Tagus, Reynolds, master was missing.

LR for 1824 showed Henry's master as S.Cock, changing to Westcott, her owner as Chanter, and her trade as Plymouth–Gibraltar. She had undergone a thorough repair and lengthening in 1824 that increased her burthen to 59 tons.

Year	Master	Owner	Trade	Source
1825	Westcott	H.Rowe	Plymouth–Malaga	LR; lengthened and thorough repair 1824
1830	Westcott	H.Rowe	Plymouth–Malaga	RS; lengthened and thorough repair 1824

Lloyd's List reported on 8 January 1828 that Henry, Westcott, master, was at Thurlstone, having been carried into port. On 3 March 1835 it reported that Henry, Towson, master, had been brought into Whitstable damaged.

Year	Master	Owner	Trade	Source
1835	Towsen			LR
1840	Towson	Towson	London	LR; small repairs 1838
1843	Towson	Towson	London–Malaga	LR; small repairs 1838 & 1841

== Fate ==
Henry was last listed in 1843.
