= Ciudad Encantada de Bolnuevo =

Sandstone formations in Murcia, Spain

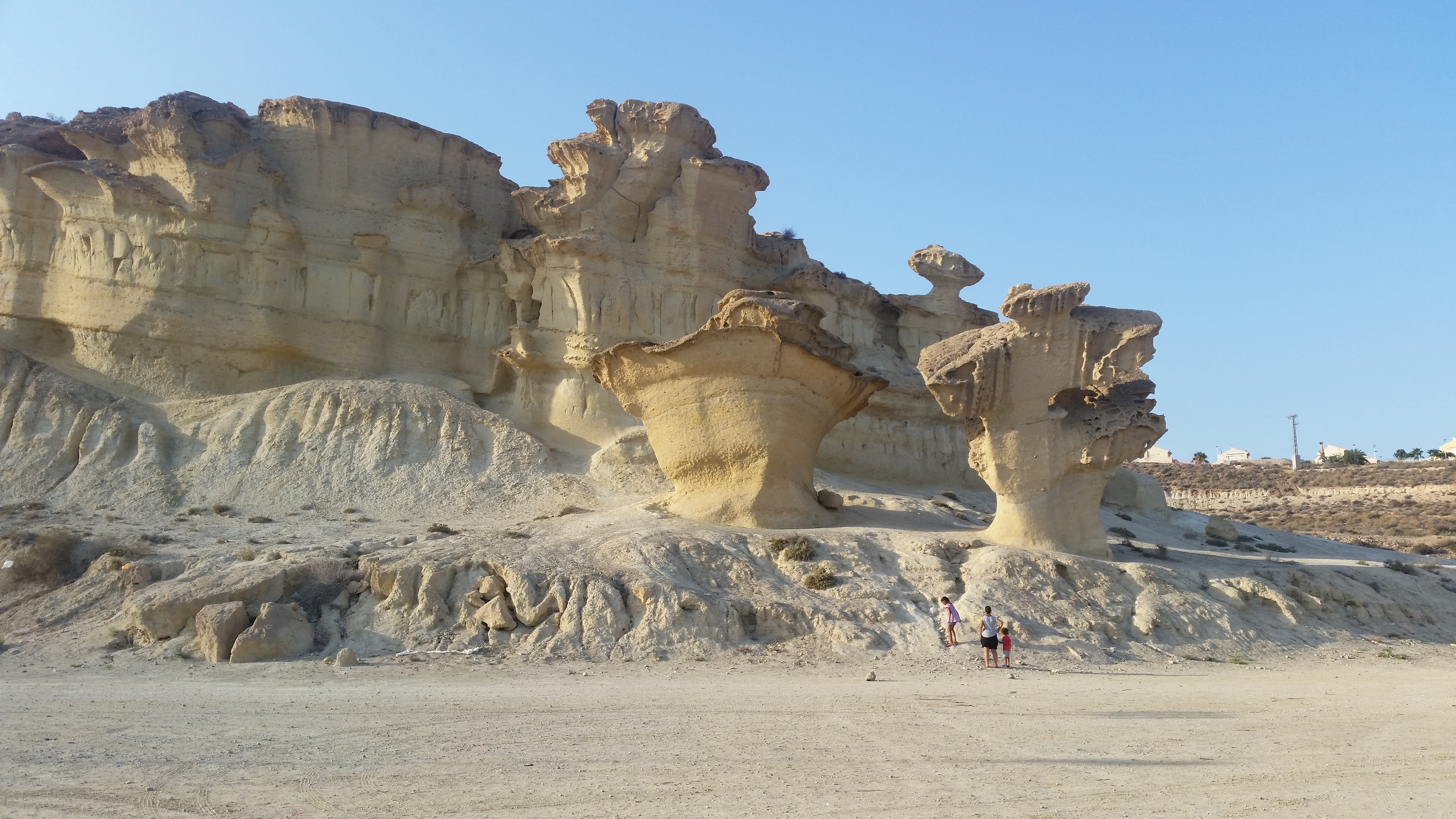
Sandstone shapes in the Ciudad Encantada de Bolnuevo

Las Gredas de Bolnuevo, also called Ciudad Encantada (enchanted city), are heavily eroded sandstone formations along the beach of Bolnuevo, Murcia, Spain. The sandstone shapes are sculpted by water and wind over thousands of years and are considered as a monument of natural interest.

The Ciudad Encantada is formed by clay (gredas). The yellowish color is caused by the large amount of sand contained in the clay. Furthermore, the clay consists of microfossils that date from the Pliocene period, about 4.5 million years ago. The sandstone has undergone an erosion process by the elements which resulted in mushroom and almost vertical shapes that seem to defy the laws of the gravity.
