= Enchanters (Detroit doo-wop band) =

Vocal group

The Enchanters were an American vocal group based in Detroit, Michigan. They produced several local hit records in the doo-wop genre during the late 1950s and early 1960s. Decades later, some of their songs have been re-released on Christmas and doo-wop compilations.

== Personnel ==
Members of the group brothers Alton Hollowell (lead vocals), Gerald Hollowell (tenor) and Ulysses Hollowell (tenor); Tommy Wade (tenor) and Jack Thomas (baritone).

== Discography ==
- 1956 - "True Love Gone (Come On Home)" / "Wait A Minute Baby"（Coral 61756）
- 1957 - "There Goes" / "Fan Me, Baby"（Coral 61832）
- 1957 - "Mambo Santa Mambo" / "Bottle Up And Go"（Coral 61916）
- 1963 - "True Love Gone" / "The Day"（Coral 62373）
- 1963 - "True Love Gone" / "There Goes A Pretty Girl"（Coral 65610）
- N/A - "One Hand, One Heart" (Coral) (unreleased)
