= Enchanted =

Enchanted may refer to:

== Film ==
- Enchanted (film), a 2007 Disney film
- Okouzlená or Enchanted, a 1942 Czech film
- Enchanted, a 1998 film featuring David Kaufman

== Literature ==
- The Enchanted (play), a 1950 English play by Maurice Valency
- Enchanted, a comics series by Serena Valentino

== Music ==
- Enchanted (Marc Almond album)
- Enchanted (Stevie Nicks album), a boxed set by Stevie Nicks
- Enchanted (soundtrack), the soundtrack album from the 2007 Disney film
- "Enchanted" (The Platters song) (1959)
- "Enchanted" (Taylor Swift song) (2010)
- "Enchanted", a 1997 song by Delerium from Karma
- "Enchanted", a 2007 song by Patrick Wolf from The Magic Position
- Enchanted, a 2013 album by Emma Stevens

== Other uses ==
- Enchanted (video game), a 2007 Nintendo DS game based on the Disney film

== See also ==
- Ciudad Encantada (Spanish for 'Enchanted City'), a geological site near the city of Cuenca, Castile-La Mancha, Spain
- Enchant (disambiguation)
- Enchanted forest
- Enchanter (disambiguation)
- Enchantment (disambiguation)
- Enchantress (disambiguation)
