= Paterna del Madera =

- Municipality
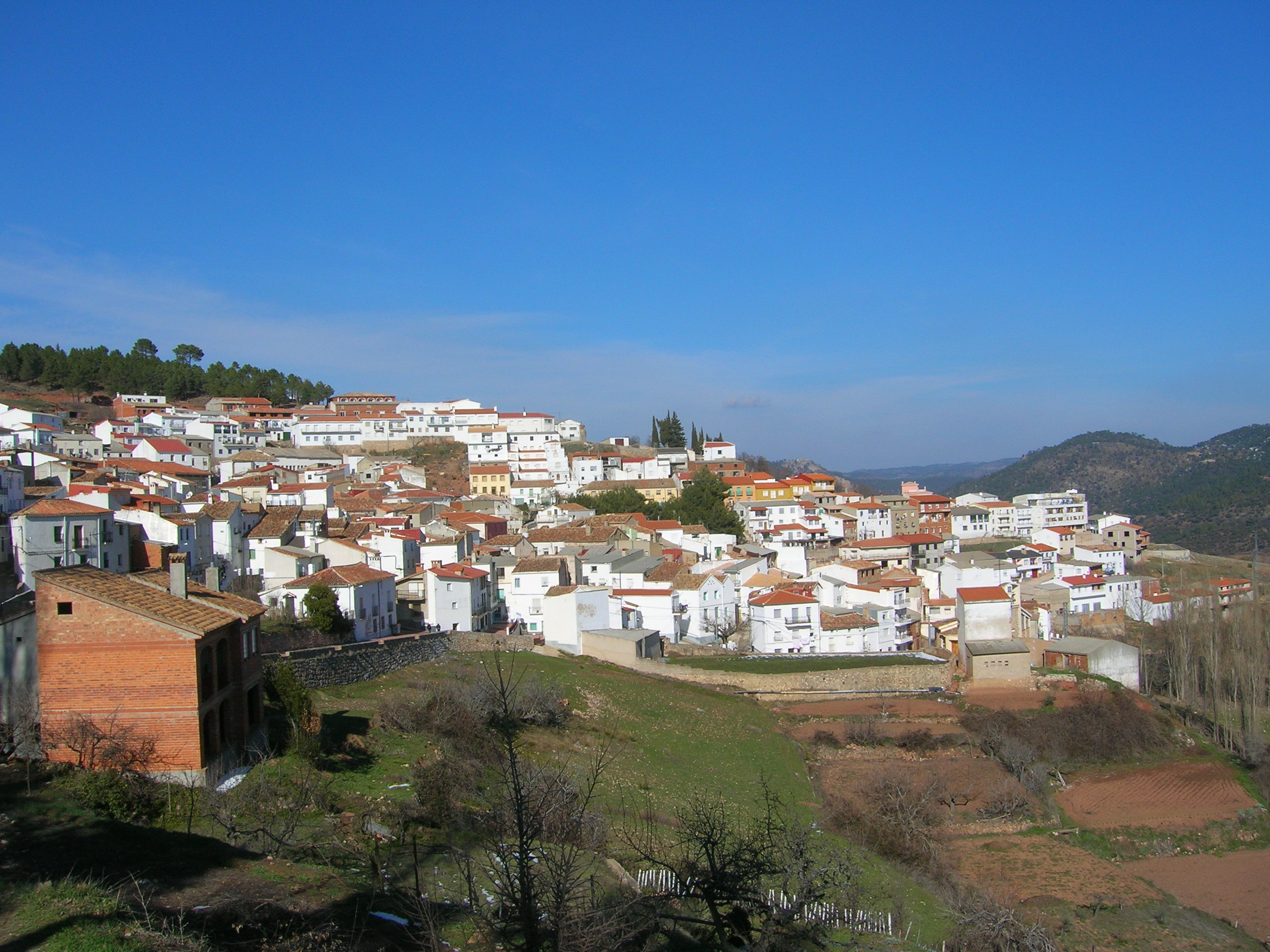
- A view of Paterna del Madera.

- Location of Paterna del Madera. Paterna del Madera (Castilla-La Mancha)
- Coordinates: 38°36′N 2°20′W
- Country: Spain
- Community: Castilla-La Mancha
- Province: Albacete

Government
  - Mayor: Rocío García Torres (PP)

Area
  - Total: 112.34 km^{2} (43.37 sq mi)

Population (2023)
  - Total: 351
  - Density: 3.12/km^{2} (8.09/sq mi)
- Time zone: UTC+1 (CET)
  - Summer (DST): UTC+2 (CEST)
- Postal code: 02136
- Website: www.paternadelmadera.com

Paterna del Madera is a municipality in Albacete, Castile-La Mancha, Spain. It has a population of 351 people.
