= Enchanter =

Enchanter may refer to:

== Magic and paranormal ==
- Enchanter (paranormal), a practitioner of magic which has the ability to attain objectives using supernatural or nonrational means
  - Enchanter (fantasy), someone who uses or practices magic that derives from supernatural or occult sources
- Seduction, the enticement of one person by another, called a seducer or enchanter when it is a handsome and charismatic man

== Entertainment ==
- Enchanter (manga), a 2002 manga series by Izumi Kawachi
- Enchanter (novel), a 1996 novel by Sara Douglass
- The Enchanter, a 1939 novella by Vladimir Nabokov

== Games ==
- Enchanter (video game), a 1983 interactive fiction game by Infocom

== Other ==
- The Enchanter, a nickname for Martin Van Buren, the eighth president of United States

== See also ==
- Enchant (disambiguation)
- Enchanted (disambiguation)
- Enchantment (disambiguation)
- Enchanters (disambiguation), various meanings including a number of similarly named American vocal groups in the Doo Wop and R&B genres that recorded in the 1950s and 1960s
- Enchantress (disambiguation)
- Tim the Enchanter, a character from the 1975 movie Monty Python and the Holy Grail
