= Enchantress Rocks =

Small group of rocks in the South Shetland Islands, Antarctica

Location of Livingston Island in the South Shetland Islands

Topographic map of Livingston Island, Greenwich, Robert, Snow and Smith Islands

The Enchantress Rocks are a small group of rocks lying off Elephant Point on the south side of western Livingston Island in the South Shetland Islands, Antarctica. The area was visited by early 19th-century sealers.

The feature is named after the British sealing ship Enchantress under Captain W. Bond that operated in the South Shetland in 1821–22.

== Location ==
The rocks are centred at 62°42′39.5″S 60°49′02.1″W, which is 3 km southeast by east of Telish Rock, 2.87 km southeast of Elephant Point, 3.73 km south by west of Bond Point, and 12.2 km southwest of Hannah Point (British mapping in 1968, Chilean in 1971, Argentine in 1980, Spanish in 1991, and Bulgarian in 2009).

== Maps ==
- L.L. Ivanov. Antarctica: Livingston Island and Greenwich, Robert, Snow and Smith Islands. Scale 1:120000 topographic map. Troyan: Manfred Wörner Foundation, 2009. ISBN 978-954-92032-6-4
