= HMS Enchantress (1804) =

Mercantile and naval ship

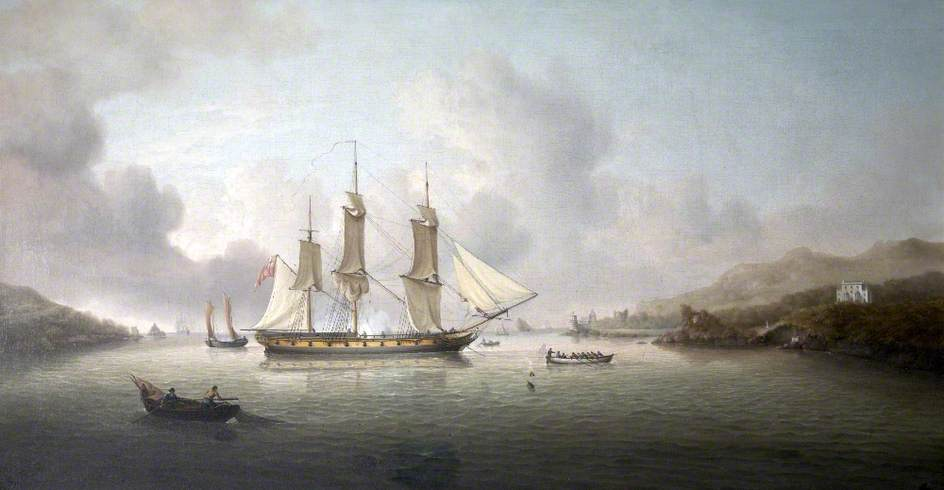
- HMS Enchantress in the River Dart, 1804, by Charles Martin Powell. Britannia Royal Naval College

History

United Kingdom
- Name: Enchantress
- Owner: Riblesdale
- Launched: 1802, Ringmore
- Fate: Sold 1804

United Kingdom
- Name: HMS Enchantress
- Acquired: 1804 by purchase
- Fate: Transferred 1817

United Kingdom
- Name: Enchantress
- Owner: Customs
- Acquired: 1817 by transfer
- Fate: unknown

General characteristics
- Type: Armed ship, later re-rated as a brig-sloop
- Tons burthen: 17544/94, or 180 (bm)
- Length: Overall: 79 ft 8 in (24.3 m) *Keel: 61 ft 4 1/4 in (18.7 m)
- Beam: 23 ft 2 1/4 in (7.1 m)
- Depth of hold: 16 ft 4 in (5.0 m)
- Propulsion: Sail
- Sail plan: Ship
- Complement: 30
- Armament: Originally: possibly 14 guns; Later:4 × 4-pounder guns
- Notes: Coppered 1802

HMS Enchantress was the merchant ship of the same name, launched in 1802 at Ringmore, Devon. The British Royal Navy bought her in 1804. She spent her naval career at Bristol as a store ship. She was transferred to the Customs service in 1817, and may have served with it until about 1850.

== Career ==
=== Mercantile service ===
Enchantress entered Lloyd's Register in 1802 with John Cole, master, and trade Teignmouth-Dartmouth. This entry continued into 1805.

=== Royal Navy service ===
The Royal Navy purchased Enchantress in 1804 and commissioned her at Bristol in October 1805 under Lieutenant George M. Higginson. She then remained at Bristol. Between 1807 and 1811 her commander was Lieutenant Robert Pearce. Lieutenant James Pasley succeeded him in 1812, only to be succeeded in 1813 by Lieutenant Joshua L. Rowe. Enchantress, then lying at Pill, on 18 March 1813 fired minute guns during the funeral procession for Captain John Phillips, late regulating officer at Bristol. Lieutenant Charles Bostock took command of "Enchantress stationary receiving ship", on 7 April 1814. He remained into 1815.

Between May and June 1816 Enchantress was at Plymouth undergoing fitting as a receiving ship. Later she was fitted there as a quarantine ship for Milford. Still, on 18 September the "Principal Officers and Commissioners of His Majesty's Navy" offered "Enchantress armed Vessel, of 176 tons" for sale at Plymouth.

Enchantress failed to sell so between January and April 1817 she underwent fitting at Sheerness for transfer to the Revenue Service. She was transferred to the Blackwater River Service in August 1818.

=== Post-military service ===
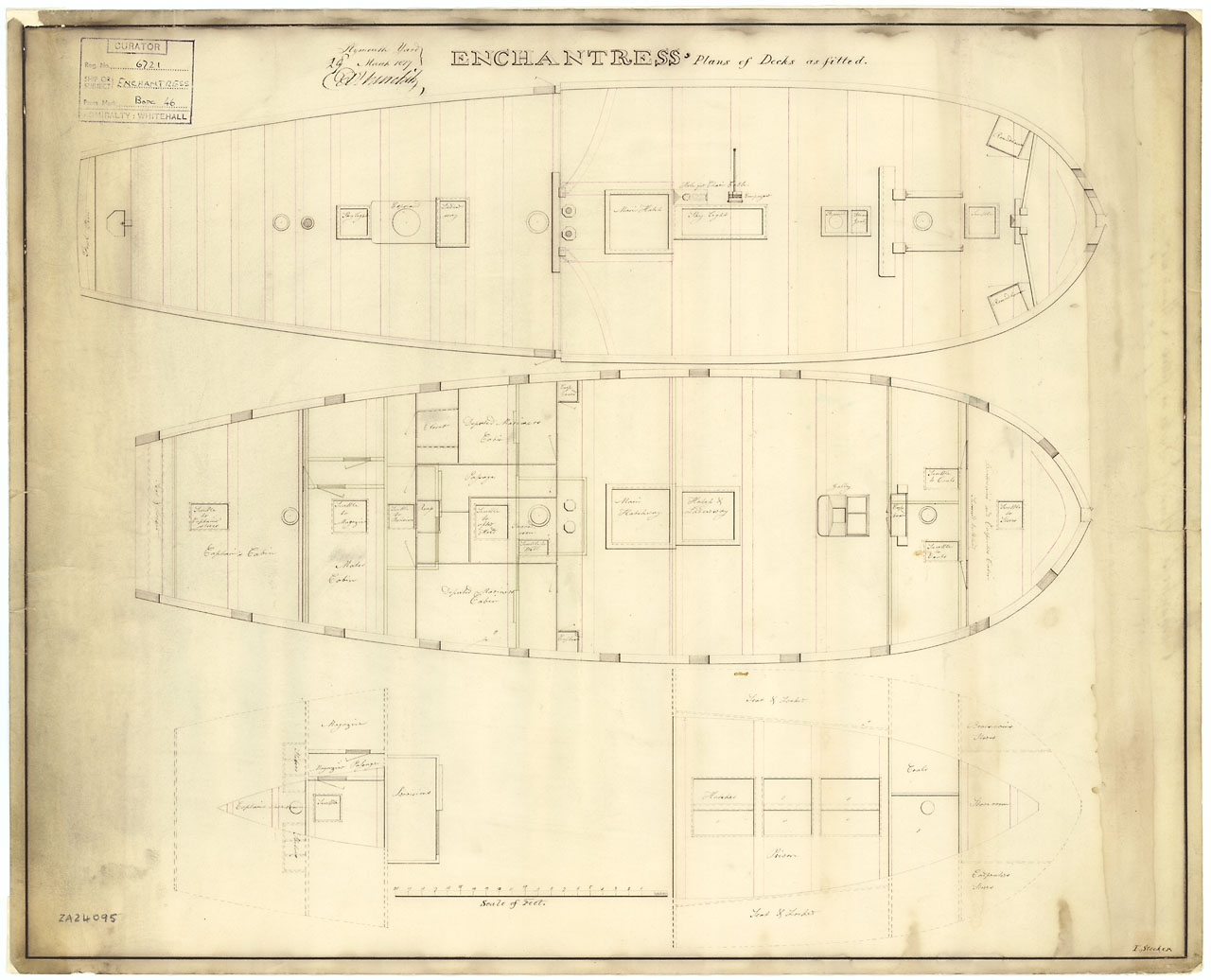
Deck plan

In 1819 she was beached at Rye Old Harbour, becoming the Blockade Guardship, providing quarters for the local Naval officer and his men. In 1825 she was recorded as having one officer, 4 petty officers and 15 men. By 1829 there were 5 marines added to the complement. She was broken up in 1869 by the owner of the nearby pub "William the Conqueror". A model of Enchantress, built mid 19th century by a local man, can be seen at Hastings Fisherman's Museum, Rockanore, Hastings

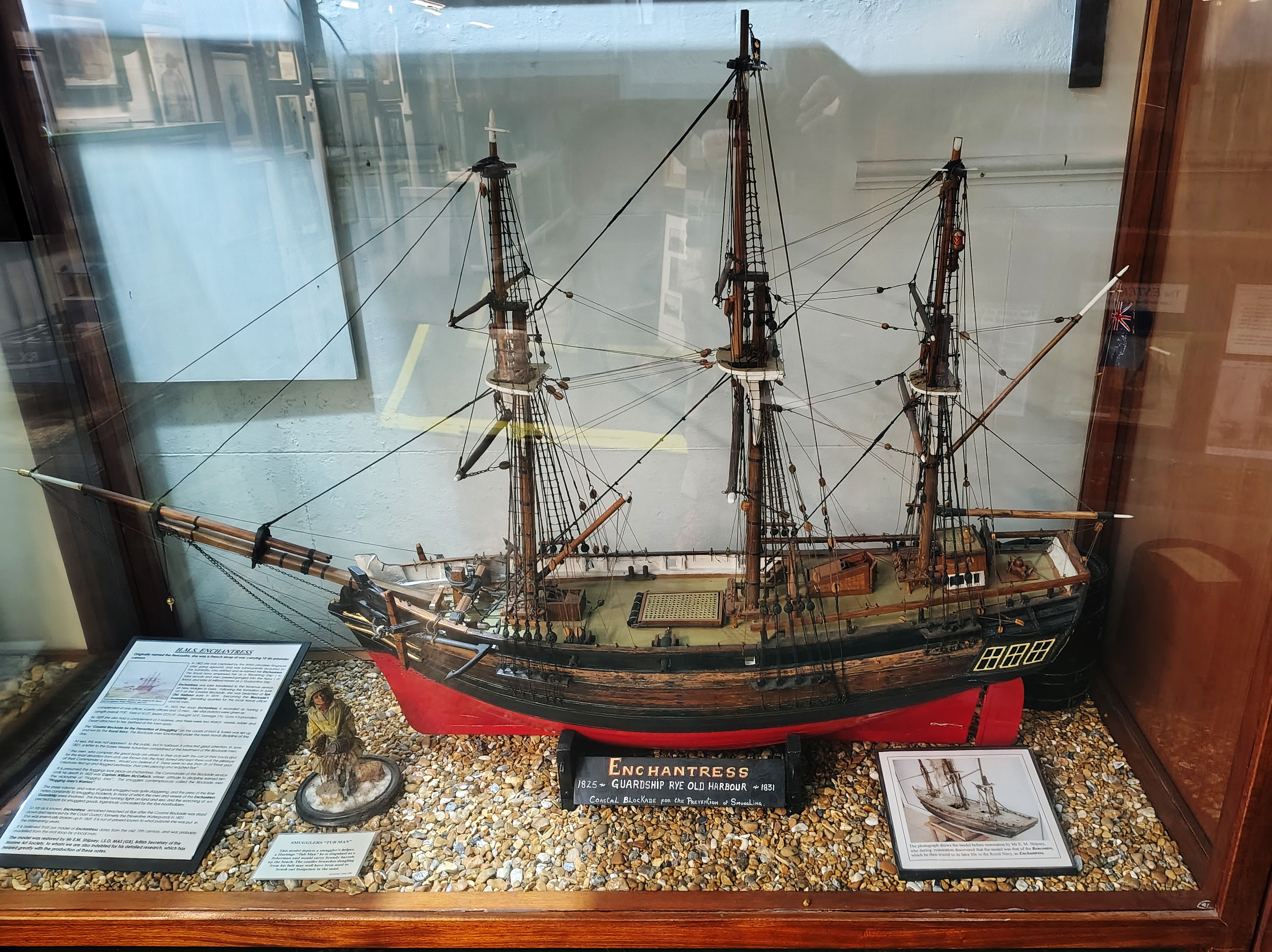
Model of HMS Enchantress, beached at Rye Harbour as HQ for Coastal Blockade and Coastguard

((During the period of the Coastal Blockade (1817–31), there was an Enchantress at Rye that served as the headquarters of the organization for Kent and Sussex. This vessel began operations in 1819, but by one account was the French vessel Rencontre, which had grounded on the coast of Sussex and been converted to this new role. The National Maritime Museum had records that indicate that there was an Enchantress extant c.1850, but it is not clear which vessel this was.))
