= Jesus Christ Superstar (soundtrack) =

Soundtrack album
- Released: June 1973
- Label: MCA

Professional ratings
Review scores
Source	Rating
Billboard	positive (a "Top Album Pick")
AllMusic	(1998 reissue)

The original soundtrack to the 1973 film Jesus Christ Superstar was released in the same year on MCA Records. The music was conducted by André Previn.

Billboard reviewed the soundtrack album and chose it as one of the "Top Album Picks" for the 16 June 1973 issue, writing: "All the powerful songs which have become popular and familiar through the release of the British caster three years ago, are rekindled with verve and zest by the movie cast. [...] Through all this there is one major question: if the first MCA original caster sold so well, who will buy the same music the second time around?"

The album peaked at number 21 on Billboard's Top LPs and Tape chart for the week of September 15, 1973.

== Track listing ==
2×LP (MCA Records, MCA 2-10000)

Side 1
No.	Title	Length
1.	"Overture"	5:26
2.	"Heaven on Their Minds"	4:22
3.	"What's the Buzz"	2:30
4.	"Strange Thing Mystifying"	1:50
5.	"Then We Are Decided"	2:32
6.	"Everything's Alright"	3:36
7.	"This Jesus Must Die"	3:45

Side 2
No.	Title	Length
1.	"Hosanna"	2:52
2.	"Simon Zealotes"	4:28
3.	"Poor Jerusalem"	1:36
4.	"Pilate's Dream"	1:45
5.	"The Temple"	5:26
6.	"I Don't Know How to Love Him"	3:55
7.	"Damned for All Time / Blood Money"	4:37

Side 3
No.	Title	Length
1.	"The Last Supper"	7:12
2.	"Gethsemane (I Only Want to Say)"	5:39
3.	"The Arrest"	3:15
4.	"Peter's Denial"	1:26
5.	"Pilate and Christ"	2:57
6.	"King Herod's Song"	3:13

Side 4
No.	Title	Length
1.	"Could We Start Again Please?"	2:44
2.	"Judas' Death"	4:38
3.	"Trial Before Pilate"	6:47
4.	"Superstar"	3:56
5.	"The Crucifixion"	2:40
6.	"John Nineteen Forty-One"	2:20
