= Jesus Christ Superstar Live in Concert =

NBC television live broadcast Easter 2018, rebroadcast 2020

- Genre: Musical; Rock opera
- Based on: Jesus Christ Superstar by: Andrew Lloyd Webber; Tim Rice
- Directed by: David Leveaux; Alex Rudzinski
- Starring: John Legend; Sara Bareilles; Brandon Victor Dixon; Alice Cooper; Norm Lewis; Ben Daniels; Jason Tam; Jin Ha; Erik Grönwall
- Composers: Andrew Lloyd Webber; Tim Rice
- Country of origin: United States
- Original language: English

Production
- Executive producers: Tim Rice; Andrew Lloyd Webber; Marc Platt; Craig Zadan; Neil Meron; John Legend; Mike Jackson; Ty Stiklorius; Alex Rudzinski
- Production locations: Marcy Avenue Armory, Williamsburg, Brooklyn, New York City, New York
- Camera setup: Shaun Harkins; Ray Hoover; Jay Kulick; Ron Lehman; Tore Livia; Adam Margolis; Lyn Noland; Jimmy O'Donnell; Mark Renaudin; Andrew Waruszewski
- Running time: 143 minutes (with commercials); 99 minutes (without commercials)
- Production companies: Sony Pictures Television; Storyline Entertainment; Marc Platt Productions; Universal Television

Original release
- Network: NBC
- Release: April 1, 2018

Related
- Hairspray Live!; Dr. Seuss' The Grinch Musical Live!

Jesus Christ Superstar Live in Concert is an American musical television special that was broadcast live on NBC on April 1, 2018 (Easter Sunday). Executively produced by Craig Zadan, Neil Meron, Andrew Lloyd Webber, Tim Rice, and Marc Platt, it was a staged concert performance of the 1970 rock opera Jesus Christ Superstar. It received positive reviews from critics but had a smaller viewership than earlier musical specials.

== Description and plot ==
The musical is almost entirely sung-through, with minimal spoken dialogue. The plot is loosely based on the Canonical Gospels' accounts of the last week of the life of Jesus Christ, beginning with the preparation for the arrival of Jesus and his disciples in Jerusalem and ending with the crucifixion.

Judas Iscariot, one of the Twelve Apostles, worries that the followers of Jesus are getting out of control and may be seen as a threat by the Roman Empire, who might harshly suppress them ("Heaven on Their Minds").

The other apostles anticipate entering Jerusalem alongside Jesus and ask him about his plans, but Jesus tells them not to worry about the future. Meanwhile, Mary Magdalene tries to help Jesus relax. Judas warns Jesus to avoid Mary, because a relationship with a prostitute could be seen as inconsistent with his teachings and be used against him. Jesus scolds Judas, saying he should not judge others unless he is free of sin. Jesus then reproaches the apostles and complains that none of them truly care for him ("What's the Buzz/Strange Thing Mystifying").

Mary reassures Jesus while anointing him. Judas fumes that the money spent on fine oil should have been used to help the poor. Jesus reasons they do not have the resources to end poverty, and that they should treasure what comforts they possess ("Everything's Alright").

Meanwhile, Caiaphas, the High Priest of Israel, assembles the Pharisees and priests. Like Judas, they fear that Jesus's followers will be seen as a threat by the Romans, and that many innocent Jews might suffer the consequences. Thus, Caiaphas concludes that for the greater good, Jesus must be executed ("This Jesus Must Die"). As Jesus and his followers arrive exultantly in Jerusalem, they are confronted by Caiaphas, who demands that Jesus disperse the crowd. Jesus instead greets them ("Hosanna"). Simon the Zealot suggests that Jesus lead his mob in a war against Rome and gain absolute power ("Simon Zealotes"). Jesus rejects this, stating that none of his followers understand what true power is ("Poor Jerusalem").

Pontius Pilate, the governor of Judea, has a dream in which he meets a Galilean and then receives the blame for the man's violent death at the hands of a mob ("Pilate's Dream"). Jesus arrives at the Temple and finds that it is being used as a marketplace; angered by this, he drives everyone out. A group of lepers ask Jesus to heal them. Their number increases, and overwhelmed, Jesus rejects them ("The Temple"). Mary Magdalene sings Jesus to sleep ("Everything's Alright (Reprise)"). While he sleeps, Mary acknowledges that she is in love with him, and it frightens her ("I Don't Know How to Love Him").

Conflicted, Judas seeks out the Pharisees and proposes helping them arrest Jesus, believing that Jesus is out of control and that Jesus himself would approve of this action. In exchange for his help, Judas is offered thirty pieces of silver. Judas adamantly refuses, but then accepts upon Caiaphas's suggestion that he could use the money to help the poor ("Damned for All Time/Blood Money").

Jesus shares a Passover meal with his disciples, where they get drunk and pay little attention to him. He remarks that "for all you care" the wine they are drinking could be his blood and the bread his body. He asks them to remember him, and then, frustrated by their lack of understanding, he predicts that Peter will deny him three times that night, and that another one of them will betray him. Judas admits that he is the one who will betray Jesus and, saying that he does not understand why Jesus had no plan, leaves ("The Last Supper").

The remaining apostles fall asleep as Jesus retreats to the Garden of Gethsemane to pray. He tells God his doubts about whether his mission has had any success and angrily demands to know why he should continue and suffer the horrible death that awaits him. Receiving no answer, he realizes that he cannot defy God's will, and surrenders to God. ("Gethsemane (I Only Want to Say)"). Judas arrives with Roman soldiers and identifies Jesus by kissing him on the cheek. When Jesus is brought to trial before the Sanhedrin, Caiaphas and the priests send him to Pilate ("The Arrest"). Meanwhile, Peter is confronted by three witnesses of Jesus's arrest, to each of whom he denies that he knows Jesus. Mary observes that Jesus had predicted this ("Peter's Denial").

Pilate asks Jesus if he is the King of the Jews. Jesus answers: "That's what you say." Since Jesus is from Galilee, Pilate says that he is not under his jurisdiction and sends him to King Herod ("Pilate and Christ"). The flamboyant King Herod pressures Jesus to prove his divinity by performing miracles, but Jesus ignores him. Herod angrily sends him back to Pilate ("King Herod's Song"). Mary Magdalene, Peter, and the apostles remember when they first began following Jesus, and wish that they could return to a time of hope and peace ("Could We Start Again, Please?").

Judas is horrified at Jesus's harsh treatment. He expresses regret to the Pharisees, correctly dreading that he will forever be remembered as a traitor. Caiaphas and Annas assure him that he has done the right thing. Judas throws the money he was given to the floor, and storms out. He curses God for manipulating him, and commits suicide ("Judas' Death").

At Jesus's trial, Pilate attempts to interrogate Jesus, but is cut off by a bloodthirsty mob which demands that Jesus be crucified. (Note: In the Broadway production, a stanza is added where Pilate admonishes the crowd for their sudden respect for Caesar, as well as for how they "produce Messiahs by the sackful"; this was kept for the film and subsequent productions.) Unnerved, he tells the mob that Jesus has committed no crime and does not deserve to die, but to satisfy the mob he will have Jesus flogged. Pilate pleads with Jesus to defend himself, but Jesus says weakly that everything has been determined by God. The crowd still calls for Jesus's death, and finally Pilate reluctantly agrees to crucify Jesus ("Trial Before Pilate (Including The 39 Lashes)").

As Jesus awaits crucifixion, the spirit of Judas returns and questions why Jesus chose to arrive in the manner and time that he did, and if it was all part of a divine plan after all ("Superstar"). Jesus is crucified, recites his final words, and dies ("The Crucifixion"). Jesus' body is taken down from the cross and buried ("John 19:41").

== Cast and characters ==
=== Main ===
- John Legend as Jesus Christ
- Sara Bareilles as Mary Magdalene
- Brandon Victor Dixon as Judas Iscariot
- Alice Cooper as King Herod
- Norm Lewis as Caiaphas
- Ben Daniels as Pontius Pilate
- Jason Tam as Peter
- Jin Ha as Annas
- Erik Grönwall as Simon Zealotes

=== Ensemble ===
- Melody Betts
- Felicia Boswell
- Abby Corrigan
- Micaela Diamond
- Rory Donovan
- Christine Dwyer
- Mike Evariste
- Will Hammond
- F. Michael Haynie
- Charissa Hogeland
- Bre Jackson
- Mykal Kilgore
- Billy Lewis Jr.
- Justin Gregory Lopez
- Angel Lozada
- Vince Oddo
- Kyle Taylor Parker
- Joel Perez
- Jonah Platt
- Conor Ryan
- Christina Sajous
- Justin Matthew Sargent
- Heath Saunders
- Joey Taranto
- Syndee Winters
- Lauren Zakrin

=== Dancers ===
- Chloe Davis
- Timothy Edwards
- Shelby Finnie
- Bahiyah Hibah
- Juel D. Lane
- Terk Lewis
- Mayte Natalio
- Sarah Parker
- Willie Smith III
- Maleek Washington

== Musical numbers ==
The musical numbers from the track list of the soundtrack.

Act I

- "Overture" – Orchestra
- "Heaven on Their Minds" – Judas
- "What's the Buzz / Strange Thing Mystifying" – Judas, Jesus, Mary, and Ensemble
- "Everything's Alright" – Mary, Judas, Jesus, and Ensemble
- "This Jesus Must Die" – Caiaphas, Annas, and Ensemble
- "Hosanna" – Jesus, Caiaphas, and Ensemble
- "Simon Zealotes / Poor Jerusalem" - Simon Zealotes and Ensemble
- "Pilate's Dream" – Pontius Pilate
- "The Temple" - Jesus and Ensemble
- "Everything's Alright (Reprise)" – Jesus and Mary
- "I Don't Know How to Love Him" – Mary
- "Damned for All Time / Blood Money" – Judas, Annas, Caiaphas, and Ensemble

Act II

- "The Last Supper" – Jesus, Judas, and Ensemble
- "Gethsemane (I Only Want to Say)" – Jesus
- "Transition" – Jesus and Judas
- "The Arrest" – Jesus, Peter, Annas, Caiaphas, and Ensemble
- "Peter's Denial" – Peter, Mary, and Ensemble
- "Pilate and Christ" – Pilate, Annas, Jesus, Ensemble
- "King Herod's Song" – Herod and Company
- "Transition After Herod" – Orchestra
- "Could We Start Again, Please?" – Mary and Peter
- "Judas' Death" – Judas, Annas, Caiaphas, and Ensemble
- "Trial Before Pilate (Including the 39 Lashes)" – Pilate, Caiaphas, Jesus, and Ensemble
- "Superstar" – Judas and Ensemble
- "The Crucifixion" – Jesus and Ensemble
- "John Nineteen: Forty One" – Orchestra

== Production ==
=== Development ===
On May 10, 2017, it was announced that NBC had selected Jesus Christ Superstar to be their next live musical event. Executive producers were expected to include Craig Zadan, Neil Meron, Marc Platt, Andrew Lloyd Webber, and Tim Rice. In December 2017, it was reported that British theater director David Leveaux would direct and that the show would be performed in front of a live audience at the Marcy Avenue Armory in Williamsburg, Brooklyn. Members of the creative crew included costume designer Paul Tazewell and choreographer Camille A. Brown.

=== Casting ===
In December 2017, it was announced that Alice Cooper had been cast as King Herod, with John Legend in the title role. The following month, it was announced that Sara Bareilles would play Mary Magdalene. In February 2018, it was announced that Brandon Victor Dixon, Norm Lewis, Ben Daniels, Jason Tam, Jin Ha, and Erik Grönwall had been cast as Judas, Caiaphas, Pontius Pilate, Peter, Annas and Simon Zealotes, respectively. The production included a cast of forty-four actors, including Joel Perez and Lauren Zakrin, and additional dancers.

Remarking on his casting as a person of color in the role of Jesus, Legend, who grew up in a religious family, told NPR, "I think we've gotten used to seeing Jesus look like he came from Oslo, when, you know, obviously he was born and raised in the Middle East and probably looked a lot closer to me." In the production, the role of Judas was also played by a Black actor, Brandon Victor Dixon.

=== Filming ===
The live production included an on-camera audience of about 1,500 people. Some of these extras lined two sides of the stage and formed a mosh pit effect. The production was expected to utilize as many as twelve cameras to film the special. In addition, a full dress rehearsal performance took place on Saturday, March 31, 2018, in front of an invited audience and was recorded. In the event of any difficulties during the live broadcast, the recording served as an emergency backup. It was ultimately not needed.

=== Marketing ===
On January 7, 2018, NBC aired the first teaser trailer for the special during their broadcast of the 75th Golden Globe Awards.

== Reception ==
=== Critical response ===
Jesus Christ Superstar Live in Concert has been met with an overwhelmingly positive response from critics since it aired. On the review aggregation website Rotten Tomatoes, the production holds a 100% approval rating with an average rating of 8.44/10 based on 26 reviews. The website's critical consensus reads, "Shaking up traditional religious and musical iconography, Jesus Christ Superstar Live in Concert is a sight to be heard, superbly infiltrating the classic source material with originality, rock legend star power, and soulful depth." Metacritic, which uses a weighted average, assigned the production a score of 81 out of 100 based on 13 critics, indicating "universal acclaim".

In a positive review, The New York Times's Noel Murray praised the special saying, "A conceptual and artistic triumph, NBC’s live telecast of Jesus Christ Superstar on Easter Sunday may have finally justified the recent live musical fad on network TV. Some technical flubs and one mixed-bag lead performance aside, the production was genuinely thrilling, taking chances with the staging of a classic but controversial Broadway show, much more daring than previous live musical broadcasts like The Sound of Music or Peter Pan."

Offering similar acclaim, The Hollywood Reporter's David Rooney said, "But here's the thing: This was a phenomenally balanced production of Jesus Christ Superstar, in which star power was equaled by depth of feeling and characterization in all the principals. And the immediacy of television, with close-ups capable of bringing us in tight on the performers' faces, gave Jesus and Mary Magdalene a complexity that often is missing from conventional productions."

Lorraine Ali of The Los Angeles Times also lauded the production saying, "The show was a collision of religion and theater and pop culture that could have been one holy mess. But by the grace of God, or maybe a great cast and lots and lots of expert staging, a great musical became a great TV production."

In a more mixed review, Maureen Ryan of Variety said, "This musical threw together glitter, sequins, leather, writhing hotties, a few big performances pitched to the last row, and camerawork that often felt as though it was hopped up on too many lattes. Actually, the ragged edges of a unifying concept did emerge over the course of the NBC musical’s two-hour-and-20-minute running time: If its philosophy could be summed up in one word, "excess" would just about cover it. That's not necessarily a bad thing. But this live show was a lot."

=== Ratings ===
Jesus Christ Superstar Live in Concert was the most-viewed program of the night of both network and cable programming. The production earned a 1.7 rating in adults 18-49 in Live + Same Day. Lee Seymour of Forbes said the telecast's ratings were a "step back for NBC's live musicals," explaining "while Superstar Live came out on top for the night's ratings, it still landed near the bottom of the pile, relative to almost every other live musical since NBC revamped the mini-genre in 2013." Jesus Christ Superstar Live in Concert was watched by 9.4 million people. Comparatively, NBC's The Sound of Music Live! was watched by 18.6 million and The Wiz Live! by 11.5 million, while Fox's Grease: Live was watched by 12.2 million. Seymour felt the special may have failed to capture a larger audience on Easter because of its blasphemous themes.

An encore on April 12, 2020, was seen by 3.17 million viewers.

=== Awards and nominations ===
Award	Category	Nominee(s)	Result	Ref.
70th Primetime Emmy Awards	Outstanding Lead Actor in a Limited Series or Movie	John Legend	Nominated	
70th Primetime Emmy Awards	Outstanding Supporting Actor in a Limited Series or Movie	Brandon Victor Dixon	Nominated	
70th Primetime Emmy Awards	Outstanding Supporting Actress in a Limited Series or Movie	Sara Bareilles	Nominated	
70th Primetime Emmy Awards	Outstanding Directing for a Limited Series, Movie or Dramatic Special	David Leveaux & Alex Rudzinski	Nominated	
70th Primetime Creative Arts Emmy Awards	Outstanding Variety Special (Live)	Tim Rice, Andrew Lloyd Webber, Marc Platt, Craig Zadan, Neil Meron, John Legend, Mike Jackson, Ty Stiklorius, Alex Rudzinski and Javier Winnik	Won	
70th Primetime Creative Arts Emmy Awards	Outstanding Casting for a Limited Series, Movie or Special	Bernard Telsey & Patrick Goodwin	Nominated	
70th Primetime Creative Arts Emmy Awards	Outstanding Costumes for Variety, Nonfiction or Reality Programming	Paul Tazewell, Laaleh Mizani, Heather Lockard, & Rory Powers	Nominated	
70th Primetime Creative Arts Emmy Awards	Outstanding Hairstyling for a Multi-Camera Series or Special	Charles LaPointe & Kevin Maybee	Nominated	
70th Primetime Creative Arts Emmy Awards	Outstanding Lighting Design / Lighting Direction for a Variety Special	Al Gurdon, Travis Hagenbuch, Ben Green, Kirk J. Miller, & Eric Christian	Won	
70th Primetime Creative Arts Emmy Awards	Outstanding Makeup for a Multi-Camera Series or Special (Non-Prosthetic)	Joe Dulude II, Angela L. Johnson, Milagros Medina-Cerdeira, LaSoyna Gunter, Margie Durand, & Andrew Sotomayor	Nominated	
70th Primetime Creative Arts Emmy Awards	Outstanding Production Design for a Variety Special	Jason Ardizzone-West & Melissa Shakun	Won	
70th Primetime Creative Arts Emmy Awards	Outstanding Sound Mixing for a Variety Series or Special	Thomas Holmes, Ellen Fitton, John Harris, Brian Flanzbaum, Mark Weglinski, David Crawford, Dan Gerhard, Mike Bove, Jason Sears, & Christian Schrader	Won	
70th Primetime Creative Arts Emmy Awards	Outstanding Technical Direction, Camerawork, Video Control for a Limited Series, Movie or Special	Eric Becker, Emelie Scaminaci, Ka-Lai Wong, Shaun Harkins, Raymond Hoover, Jay Kulick, Ron Lehman, Tore Livia, Adam Margolis, Lyn Noland, Jimmy O'Donnell, Mark S. Renaudin, & Andrew Waruszewski	Won	
9th Critics' Choice Television Awards	Best Movie Made for Television	Jesus Christ Superstar Live in Concert	Won	
9th Critics' Choice Television Awards	Best Actor in a Limited Series or a Movie Made for Television	John Legend	Nominated	
9th Critics' Choice Television Awards	Best Supporting Actor in a Limited Series or a Movie Made for Television	Brandon Victor Dixon	Nominated	
34th Artios Awards	Outstanding Achievement in Casting – Live Television Performance, Variety or Sketch Comedy	Bernard Telsey & Patrick Goodwin	Won	
23rd Art Directors Guild Awards	Excellence in Production Design for a Variety, Reality or Event Special	Jason Ardizzone-West	Nominated	
71st Directors Guild of America Awards	Outstanding Directorial Achievement in Movies for Television and Limited Series	David Leveaux & Alex Rudzinski	Nominated	
61st Annual Grammy Awards	Best Musical Theater Album	Sara Bareilles, Alice Cooper, Ben Daniels, Brandon Victor Dixon, Erik Grönwall, Jin Ha, John Legend, Norm Lewis & Jason Tam (principal soloists); Harvey Mason Jr. (producer)	Nominated	
55th Cinema Audio Society Awards	Outstanding Achievement in Sound Mixing for a Television Non-Fiction, Variety or Music Series or Specials	Tom Holmes, Brian Flanzbaum, Christian Schrader, Ellen Fitton, John Harris, & Anthony Lalumia	Nominated	
6th Make-Up Artists and Hair Stylists Guild Awards	Motion Picture Made for Television or Special – Best Contemporary Hair Styling	Charles Lapointe & Kevin Maybee	Won	
21st Costume Designers Guild Awards	Excellence in Variety, Reality-Competition, Live Television	Paul Tazewell	Nominated	

== Other media ==
=== Andrew Lloyd Webber: Tribute to a Superstar ===
On March 28, 2018, a one-hour special titled Andrew Lloyd Webber: Tribute to a Superstar premiered on NBC in honor of Lloyd Webber's 70th birthday and to promote the coming premiere of Jesus Christ Superstar Live in Concert. In the special, Lloyd Webber was interviewed by Glenn Close, John Legend, and Lin-Manuel Miranda. It also included appearances by some of the performers from Jesus Christ Superstar Live in Concert in various rehearsal scenes from the show.

The special was executive produced and directed by Brad Lachman, and written and produced by Matt Lachman. Interviews were conducted at Sardi's restaurant, Power Station recording studio, and the Renaissance Hotel Times Square. Production companies involved in the special included Brad Lachman Productions and Universal Television.

=== Soundtrack ===
Jesus Christ Superstar Live in Concert (Original Soundtrack of the NBC Television Event)

Soundtrack album by Original Television Cast of Jesus Christ Superstar Live in Concert
- Released: April 6, 2018
- Recorded: 2018
- Genre: Soundtrack
- Length: 1:35:38
- Label: Sony Masterworks

An official soundtrack was released by Sony Masterworks, digitally on April 6, 2018, and physically on April 27, 2018.

==== Track listing ====
All lyrics are written by Tim Rice; all music is composed by Andrew Lloyd Webber.

No.	Title	Length
1.	"Overture"	4:29
2.	"Heaven on Their Minds"	4:30
3.	"What's The Buzz / Strange Thing Mystifying"	4:22
4.	"Everything's Alright"	4:05
5.	"This Jesus Must Die"	3:36
6.	"Hosanna"	2:59
7.	"Simon Zealotes / Poor Jerusalem"	5:12
8.	"Pilate's Dream"	1:48
9.	"The Temple"	5:17
10.	"Everything's Alright (Reprise)"	0:40
11.	"I Don't Know How to Love Him"	3:40
12.	"Damned for All Time / Blood Money"	4:33
13.	"The Last Supper"	7:10
14.	"Gethsemane (I Only Want to Say)"	5:44
15.	"Transition"	0:22
16.	"The Arrest"	4:02
17.	"Peter's Denial"	0:38
18.	"Pilate and Christ"	2:58
19.	"King Herod's Song"	3:22
20.	"Transition After Herod"	0:39
21.	"Could We Start Again, Please?"	2:35
22.	"Judas's Death"	4:54
23.	"Trial Before Pilate (Including The 39 Lashes)"	6:19
24.	"Superstar"	4:34
25.	"The Crucifixion"	1:48
26.	"John Nineteen: Forty One"	2:48
27.	"Curtain Call"	2:34
Total length:		1:35:38

==== Commercial performance ====
The album debuted at number 46 on the US Billboard 200, earning 13,000 album-equivalent units in its first week according to Nielsen Music, with over 11,000 units coming from traditional album sales. It also debuted at number 3 the same week on the Soundtracks chart, as well as at number 14 on the Top Album Sales chart.

==== Charts ====
Chart (2018)	Peak position
US Billboard 200	46
US Billboard Top Soundtracks	3
US Billboard Top Album Sales	14

== See also ==
- 2018 in American television
- The Passion: New Orleans, a 2016 television special on Fox
