= Jesus Christ Superstar (original Broadway cast recording) =

Jesus Christ Superstar — Original Broadway Cast

Cast recording
- Released: late 1971 or early 1972
- Label: Decca

Professional ratings
Review scores
Source	Rating
AllMusic	3.5/5 stars

Selections from the first Broadway production (1971) of the rock opera Jesus Christ Superstar were released on the album subtitled "Original Broadway Cast".

The album peaked at number 31 on Billboard's Top LPs chart in January 1972.

The album was nominated for the 1973 Grammy to the Album of the Year.

== Track listing ==
LP (Decca DL 1503)

Side 1
No.	Title	Artist(s)	Length
1.	"Heaven on Their Minds"	Ben Vereen	3:43
2.	"Everything's Alright"	Yvonne Elliman, Ben Vereen, Jeff Fenholt, Chorus	3:53
3.	"This Jesus Must Die"	Bob Bingham, Phil Jethro, Alan Braunstein, Michael Meadows, Steven Bell	1:44
4.	"Hosanna"	Chorus, Bob Bingham, Jeff Fenholt	2:02
5.	"Pilate's Dream"	Barry Dennen	1:37
6.	"I Don't Know How to Love Him"	Yvonne Elliman	3:28
7.	"Gethsemane (I Only Want to Say)"	Jeff Fenholt	4:48

Side 2
No.	Title	Artist(s)	Length
1.	"King Herod's Song"	Paul Ainsley, Chorus	3:09
2.	"Could We Start Again Please"	Yvonne Elliman, Michael Jason, Chorus	2:26
3.	"Judas' Death"	Ben Vereen, Bob Bingham, Phil Jethro, Chorus	4:28
4.	"Trial Before Pilate"	Barry Dennen, Bob Bingham, Jeff Fenholt, Chorus	6:26
5.	"Superstar"	Ben Vereen, Chorus	4:01
6.	"John Nineteen: Forty One"	"Jesus Christ Superstar" Original Broadway Cast	2:11
