= Bob Bingham =

American actor (1946–2025)

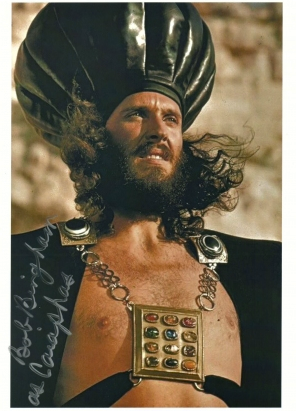
- Bingham as Caiaphas in Jesus Christ Superstar (1973)
- Born: Robert Franklin Bingham; October 29, 1946; Seattle, Washington, U.S.
- Died: February 8, 2025 (aged 78); Carmel, New York, U.S.
- Education: University of Washington
- Occupations: Actor; singer
- Years active: 1970–1974
- Children: 2

Robert Franklin Bingham (October 29, 1946 – February 8, 2025) was an American actor and singer. Bingham is best known for playing the role of Caiaphas in Andrew Lloyd Webber and Tim Rice's rock opera Jesus Christ Superstar in the first USA concert tour, original Broadway cast, original French cast, and in the 1973 film version.

== Life and career ==
Bingham was born on October 29, 1946, in Seattle, and was raised in Edmonds, Washington. He attended the University of Washington for three years and studied singing with Ernest J. Anderson and acting with Larry and Pamela Liester's Home Adjunct, Inc. His first professional appearance was in a touring production of the musical Hair in 1970, first at the Moore Theatre in Seattle that ran for more than three months, a local record, and then in Miami, Florida. In the 1970s Bingham led a Buddhist group dedicated to world peace.

Bingham played the role of Caiaphas in the original concert tour of Jesus Christ Superstar and went on to perform the role in the original Broadway production which ran from 1971 to 1973, and in a Paris production. He appeared in the film by Juan Orol, El fantástico mundo de los hippies in 1972. Along with Barry Dennen (Pilate) and Yvonne Elliman (Mary Magdalene) and Carl Anderson (Judas), Bingham reprised his Broadway role in the 1973 film Jesus Christ Superstar. In 1974, he played God in the original production of Up from Paradise, by Arthur Miller, in Ann Arbor, Michigan. He retired from show business soon afterwards and worked in a managerial position in a Talon zipper factory.

In April 2015, he appeared on-stage at the Hollywood Boulevard Cinema in a question and answer session with Ted Neeley, Barry Dennen and Kurt Yaghjian following a showing of a remastered version of the 1973 film Jesus Christ Superstar. This was as part of a national screening tour. His reminiscences of appearing in the 1973 film were recorded with those of the rest of the original cast in the DVD Superstar: the Making and Reunion of the Film (2015).

Bingham lived in Brewster, New York, with his wife Idilcia Aracena, and his two children, Franklin and Yasamin. He died in Carmel, New York on February 8, 2025, at the age of 78.
