= The Rebel Jesus =

- Written by: Larry Buchanan
- Produced by: Larry Buchanan
- Release date: 1974
- Country: United States
- Language: English

The Rebel Jesus is a film about the life of Jesus Christ. It was made in 1972 to capitalize on the concurrent release of the film versions of Jesus Christ Superstar and Godspell. It was a longtime passion project for Buchanan.

== The Copper Scroll of Mary Magdalene ==
The Copper Scroll of Mary Magdalene
- Directed by: Larry Buchanan; Tony Huston
- Written by: Larry Buchanan
- Produced by: Larry Buchanan
- Release date: 2004
- Country: United States
- Language: English

The film was subsequently recut by Buchanan in 2004 as The Copper Scroll of Mary Magdalene. He was working on it at the time of his death.
