= Jesus Christ Superstar (film) =

1973 musical film by Norman Jewison

- Theatrical release poster
- Directed by: Norman Jewison
- Screenplay by: Melvyn Bragg; Norman Jewison
- Based on: Jesus Christ Superstar by: Andrew Lloyd Webber; Tim Rice
- Produced by: Norman Jewison; Robert Stigwood
- Starring: Ted Neeley; Carl Anderson; Yvonne Elliman; Barry Dennen
- Cinematography: Douglas Slocombe
- Edited by: Antony Gibbs
- Music by: Andrew Lloyd Webber (score); Tim Rice (lyrics)
- Distributed by: Universal Pictures
- Release dates: June 26, 1973 (Uptown Theater); August 15, 1973 (U.S.)
- Running time: 106 minutes
- Country: United States
- Language: English
- Budget: $3.5 million
- Box office: $24.5 million

Jesus Christ Superstar is a 1973 American musical Biblical drama film directed by Norman Jewison, co-written by Jewison and Melvyn Bragg, and choreographed by Robert Iscove. It is based on the 1970 concept album written by Tim Rice and composed by Andrew Lloyd Webber, which in turn spawned the 1971 stage musical. The film depicts the conflict between Judas and Jesus and the emotions and motivations of the main characters during the week of the crucifixion of Jesus. It stars Ted Neeley, Carl Anderson, Yvonne Elliman, and Barry Dennen in the principal roles.

Jesus Christ Superstar premiered at the Uptown Theater in Washington, D.C. on June 26, 1973, and was released theatrically in the United States on August 15, 1973. Despite criticism from a few religious groups and mixed reviews from critics, the film was a box office success. Neeley, Anderson, and Elliman were nominated for Golden Globe Awards in 1974 for their portrayals of Jesus, Judas, and Mary Magdalene, respectively. The film was also nominated for the Golden Globe Award for Best Motion Picture – Musical or Comedy and the Academy Award for Best Original Score.

== Plot ==
A theatrical troupe travel by bus to the Negev Desert to perform a modern-day re-enactment of the Passion of Christ told through song. Carl Anderson, already in character as Judas Iscariot, wanders away from the group as they prepare their props and costumes and dance to the overture.

Judas, a member of a humanitarian movement, is worried its leader, Jesus, has lost sight of their cause and he now preaches about being the son of God instead of speaking out on social injustices. He clashes with Jesus over his association with Mary Magdalene (historically accused of being a prostitute) and how he allows her to purchase expensive ointments for him instead of instructing her to help the poor. Jesus defends Mary and tells Judas the poor will always be there, but he will not. Meanwhile, temple priests led by Caiaphas and Annas, afraid that Jesus' popularity will undermine their authority and lead to conflict with their Roman occupiers, resolve to have Jesus executed.

As crowds greet Jesus upon his arrival in Jerusalem for Passover, Jesus rejects both Caiaphas' order to disperse them and his follower Simon's suggestion to lead them into an uprising against Rome. While in Jerusalem, Jesus furiously forces out money lenders and merchants from the temple and encounters a leper colony in the outskirts, where Mary Magdalane contemplates her complex feelings for him. Meanwhile, Judas expresses his concerns about Jesus to the priests, but resists betraying him until the priests offer him money, suggesting he could use it for charitable means, in return for helping them to arrest Jesus.

Jesus shares the Passover meal with his followers in the Garden of Gethsemane, where he doubts their loyalties, predicting that Peter will deny knowing him and Judas will betray him. An argument between Jesus and Judas ensues, with Judas angrily accusing Jesus of letting his ideals become corrupted. When the rest of his followers fall asleep, Jesus questions God's intention for him, ultimately deciding to accept what happens as being part of his plan. Judas fulfills his betrayal by leading Roman guards to Jesus, who allows himself to be arrested and he is brought to Caiaphas and Annas, who accuse him of blasphemy. The populace accuse Peter of following Jesus, which he denies, leading him, Mary Magdalane and the other followers to question if Jesus's predictions have come true.

Jesus is brought to Pontius Pilate, who does not deal with Jews and sends him to Herod instead, who urges Jesus to perform miracles for him and dismisses him as a fraud when he does not. Judas becomes overwhelmed with grief, regret and confusion over his actions and, blaming God for making him the betrayer, hangs himself. Jesus is tried by Pilate, who believes him to be delusional but has committed no crime, yet he is pressured by crowds to condemn Jesus to death. Confused and enraged at Jesus' inexplicable resignation and refusal to defend himself, and unable to quell the crowds even after having Jesus flogged, Pilate is left with no option but to order Jesus' execution.

While Judas' spirit questions the significance of Jesus' death, Jesus is led away to Golgotha and crucified. After he dies on the cross, the cast, no longer in character, board their bus and leave, with Barry Dennen, Yvonne Elliman and Carl Anderson the only ones who seem to notice that the actor who played Jesus is missing. The film ends on a lingering shot of the cross that was used to crucify Jesus, set against the setting sun.

== Cast ==
- Ted Neeley as Jesus Christ
- Carl Anderson as Judas Iscariot
- Yvonne Elliman as Mary Magdalene
- Barry Dennen as Pontius Pilate
- Bob Bingham as Caiaphas
- Larry Marshall as Simon Zealotes
- Josh Mostel as King Herod
- Kurt Yaghjian as Annas
- Robert LuPone as James
- Philip Toubus as Peter
- Thommie Walsh as Thaddeus
- Richard Molinare as Andrew
- Richard Orbach as John
- Pi Douglass, Jonathan Wynne, David Devir, Jeff Hyslop and Shooki Wagner as other Apostles
- Darcel Leonard Wynne, Leeyan Granger Neeley, Denise Pence, Baayork Lee, Susie Allanson, and Steve Boockvor as members of the ensemble

== Production ==
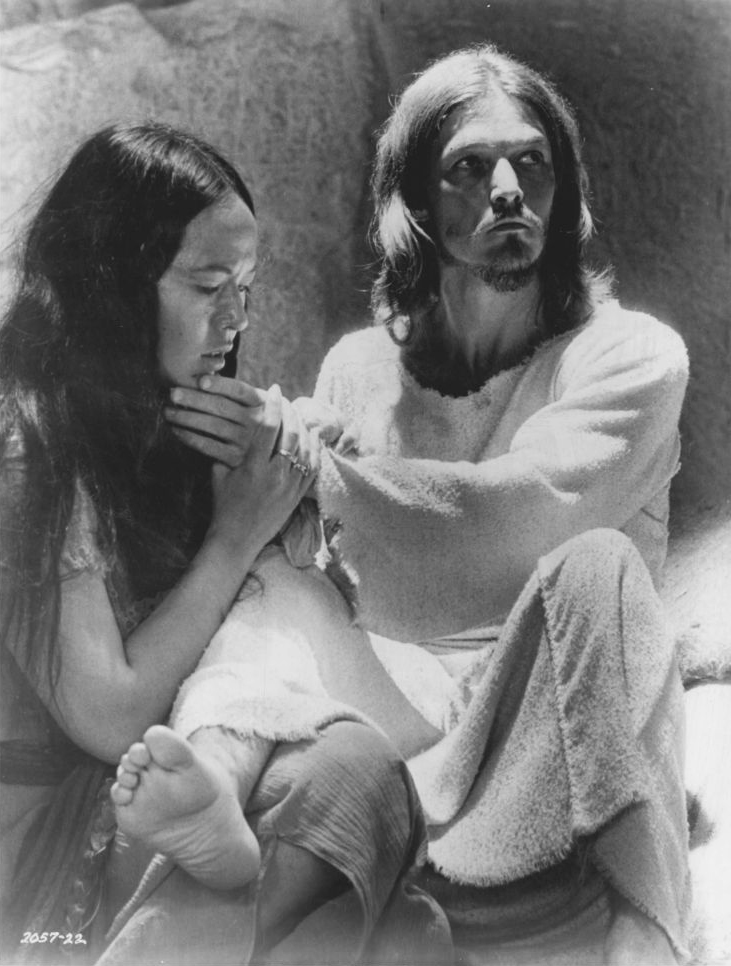
Yvonne Elliman and Ted Neeley as Mary Magdalene and Jesus

=== Development ===
During filming of Fiddler on the Roof (1971), Barry Dennen, who had a minor role in the film, provided a concept album by Andrew Lloyd Webber and Tim Rice to Norman Jewison, Jesus Christ Superstar (1970), where Dennen voiced Pilate. At that time, the LP, despite its title song being a hit single, was "met with a massive dose of British indifference, even condescension", recalled Lloyd Webber, and was thought of by Fiddler on the Roof producer Patrick Palmer as an "obscure album from England" when Jewison first obtained it. Jewison described himself as "curiously moved" and "flooded with exciting visual images" when first hearing the record, amazed by its ability to execute so much without spoken lines. He first publicly expressed interest in directing a film based on the album in an interview at the New York premiere of Fiddler on the Roof: "I could see it as an exciting innovative movie just as it was—just music and lyrics, no dialogue."

Jewison, after finding out MCA Records owned the film rights, contacted Lew Wasserman for the chance of directing a film adaptation of the musical. Although other directors were considered, Jewison's past filmography plus his blueprint for the film influenced Universal to hire him. A meeting between Jewison, Lloyd Webber, and Universal Pictures executive Ned Tanen soon followed. Lloyd Webber agreed to the film project, citing Jewison's experience with Fiddler on the Roof, an adaptation of a musical with religious themes.

The latest stage production of Jesus Christ Superstar before the film was a Robert Stigwood-produced Broadway run in 1970. Budgeted at more than $1,000,000, not counting Stigwood's own financial contributions, the show profited $700,000 with an overcall $8,557.83. However, its run was shorter than planned. Professional reviews were overwhelmingly abysmal, and, commercially, the show declined by its eighth month as a result of decrease in advance ticket purchases and prices being too high for the show's young fanbase. Within 11 months, the run sustained with Sunday matinees and discount prices for certain shows. Broadway insiders felt it would last up until the film adaptation's release.

Work on the script began with drafting from Tim Rice. His vision was an epic film in the style of Ben-Hur (1959), summarizing his workflow as figuring out "which massive visual effect accompanied which song". However, Jewison's concept differed, and thus Rice's draft was scrapped. Alongside Melvyn Bragg, Jewison wrote a screenplay as a pastiche that combined biblical and modern elements of culture, particularly with its theater group framing device. Bragg, who had already established himself as a television writer, was a co-writer of the screenplay. He described entering the project as "a sort of fluke", getting signed only after a colleague asked "Would you like a go?" Summarized Bragg, "all the good bits were what [I] worked on", although Bragg did provide input to Jewison about what he perceived to be the director's overuse of crowds in shots. Bragg and Jewison wrote the script while scouting locations, as moving around deserts in Israel while the concept album played on a tape recorder immersed them in the film's setting.

=== Casting ===
Jesus Christ Superstar was the first film credit for all actors except Dennen and Josh Mostel. The cast consisted mostly of actors from the Broadway show, with Ted Neeley and Carl Anderson starring as Jesus and Judas respectively. Neeley had played a reporter and a leper in the Broadway version, and understudied the role of Jesus. Anderson also understudied Judas, but took over the role on Broadway and Los Angeles when Ben Vereen fell ill. Along with Dennen, Yvonne Elliman (Mary Magdalene), and Bob Bingham (Caiaphas) reprised their Broadway roles in the film. (Elliman, like Dennen, had also appeared on the original concept album.) Philip Toubus appeared in both the Broadway production and in the touring production.

According to casting notes Jewison wrote on stationery paper at the Beverly Hills Hotel, he considered Mick Jagger, John Lennon, Paul McCartney, Barry Gibb, Robert Plant, and Ian Gillan for the titular character. Gillan, who played Jesus on the concept album, turned down Jewison's offer because he thought he would please fans more by touring with Deep Purple. The producers also considered Micky Dolenz (from The Monkees) and David Cassidy to play Jesus. Then, in 1971, Jewison drove from Palm Springs, California to Los Angeles to view Neeley on stage in a musical adaptation of The Who's Tommy (1969), after an invitation from Neeley's agent. Neeley did not appear the night Jewison arrived, as he was taking a break. However, Neeley, wearing Levi's clothing and a fake mustache and beard, encountered Jewison at a motel the next morning to apologize about his absence from the performance, his rationale being illness. Following a 20-minute meeting, and without seeing Neeley perform the part, Jewison said to his production partner Pat Palmer that "I had a hunch that I had found our Jesus".

In responding to a question from the Vatican Press about why Jewison cast a black actor for Judas, the director responded that Anderson "tested along with many others in London, and as always happens, the film really told us what to do. The test was so successful that there really wasn't any doubt in my mind at all that he was the most talented actor to play the role".

=== Filming ===
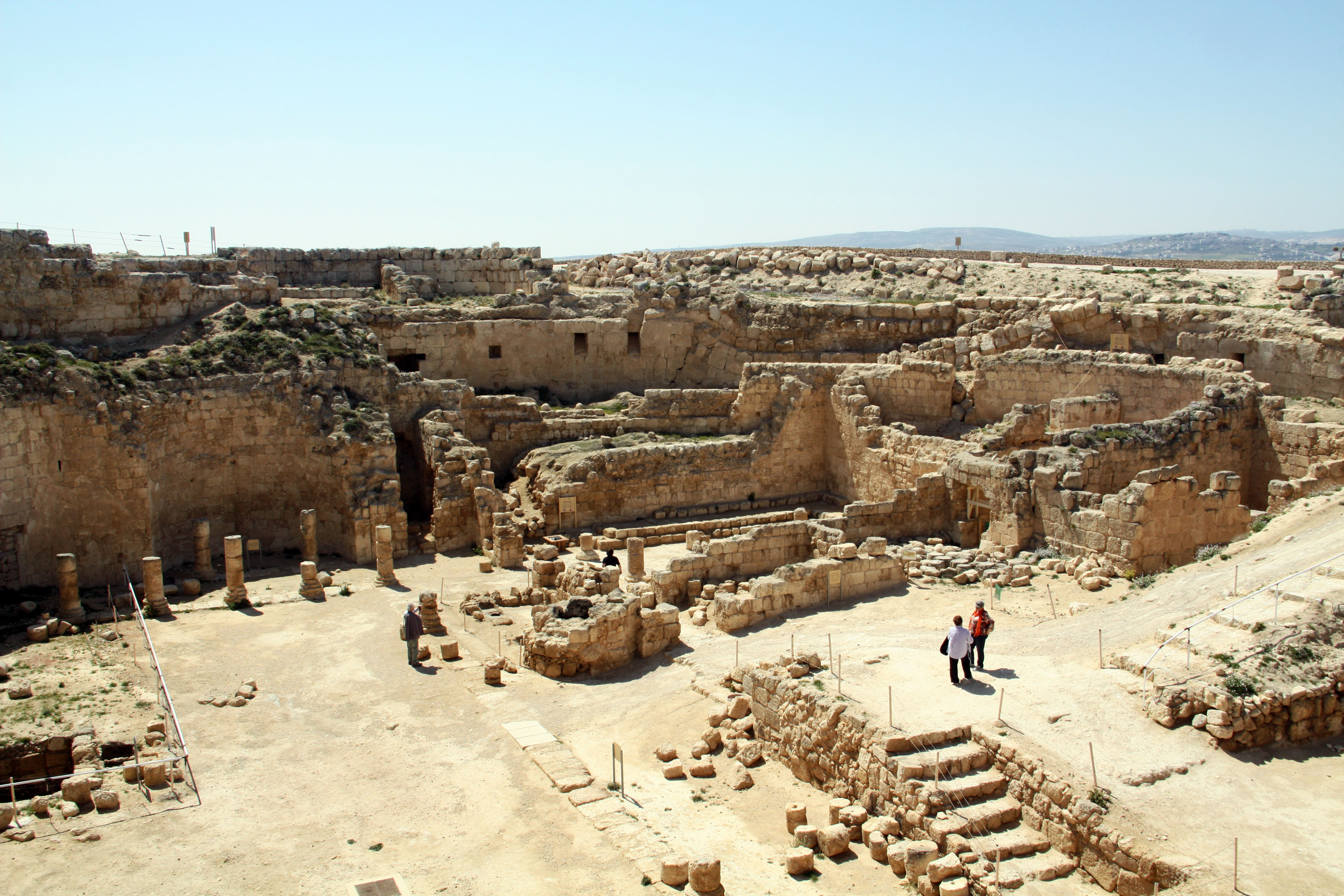
Upper Herodium

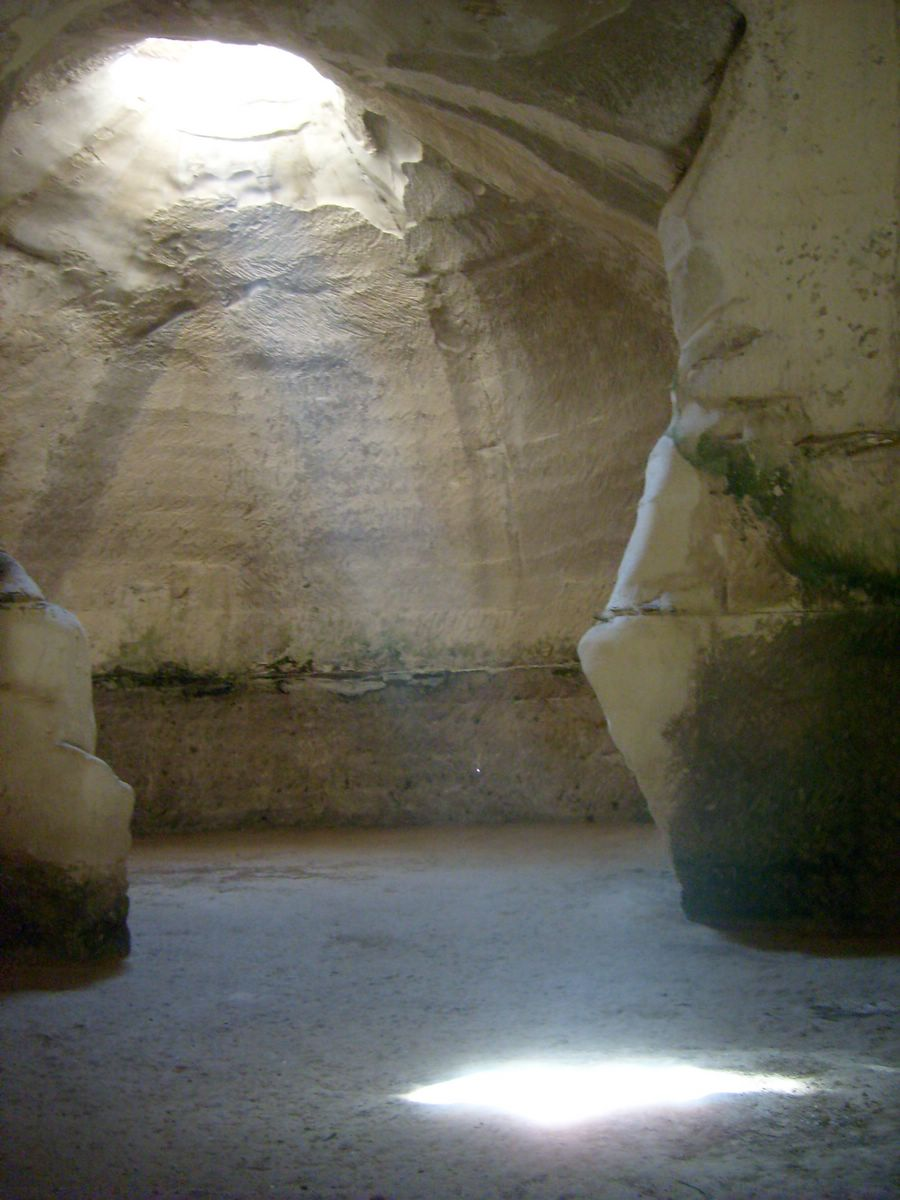
Beit Guvrin caves

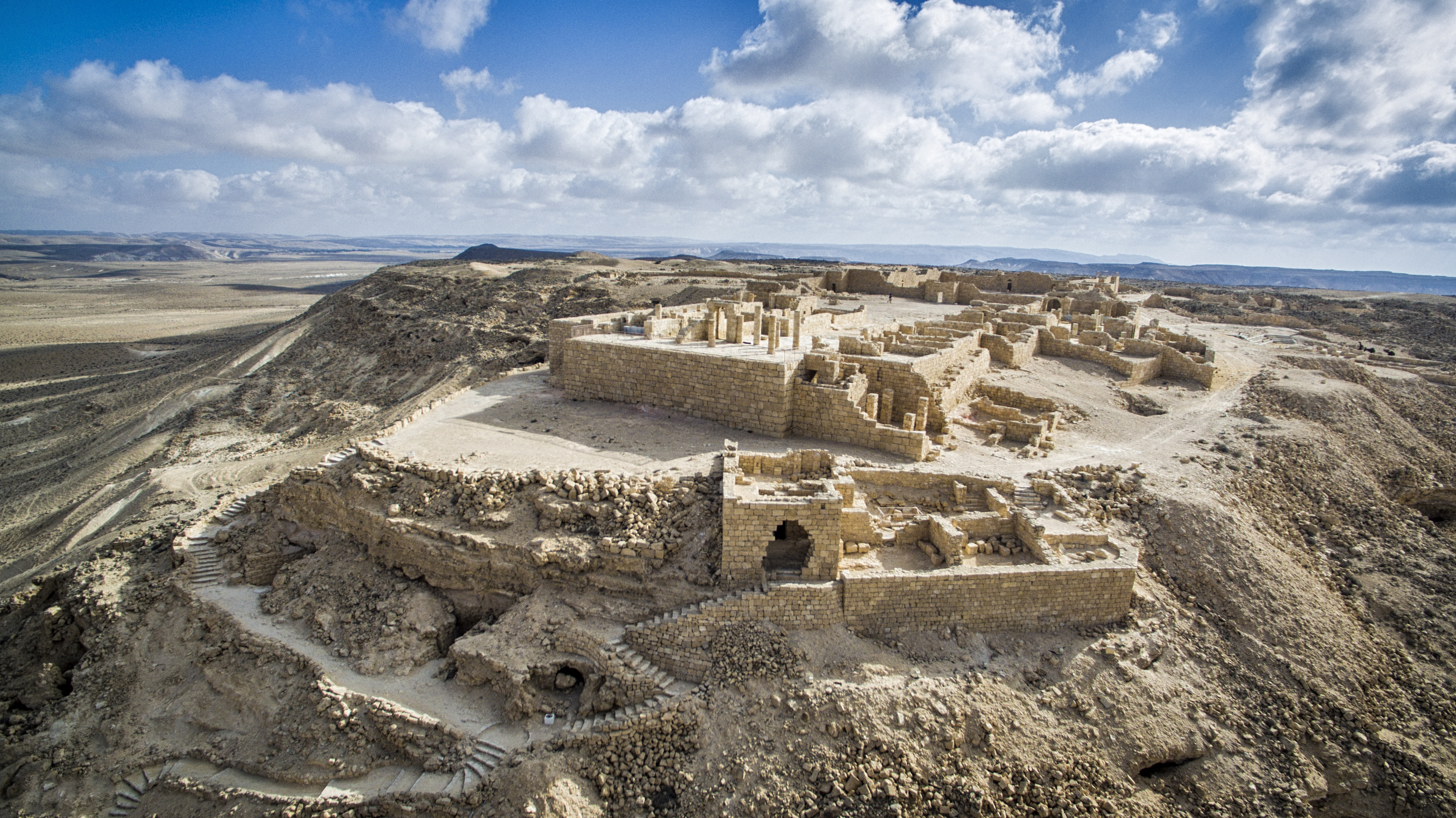
Avdat

We already had one Jesus here, and he gave us more than enough trouble.

— Tel Aviv policeman

Shooting of Jesus Christ Superstar took place at more than 20 locations in four Israeli camp bases, those being Jerusalem, Dead Sea, Beersheba, and Nazareth; the most utilized location was Herodium in the West Bank. The budget was set at just under $3.5 million, partially supported by the Israeli government; in addition to a 23.5% rebate on import of foreign currency, some senior officials, who were trying to start an Israeli Film Centre, funded the project. Jewison, in return, wrote a piece for Variety promoting Israeli areas for shooting locations. As he wrote, "there is a spirit in the country and among its people that grabs you, and if you spend any time there you will never be the same." For their performances, Elliman, Neeley, and Anderson each received US$16,500 (equivalent to $127,000 in 2025), while Jewison was paid a reduced fee of $15,000 (equivalent to $115,500 in 2025), in exchange for 10% of the film's worldwide profits.

Shooting began on August 18, 1972, in the caves of Beit Gubrin (today the Beit Guvrin National Park), following days of cleaning up fecal matter from birds and bats. Used for the segments for "What’s the Buzz?", "Strange Thing Mystifying", and "Everything's Alright", the location was chosen by Jewison to make Jesus and his Apostles look like an underground movement of rock artists; in fact, he cast little-known rock musicians for the Apostles, and only two of them had prior experience in film. Production then moved to the West Bank, which had been controlled by Israel following the Six-Day War in 1967. Choreographer Robert Iscove recalled, "Arabs with machine guns came over the hill, pointing at us. They were from a neighbouring village and there had been some tiff that had nothing to do with the actual war." For most sequences, Iscove determined the location on the first day of its choreography, and the dancing and camerawork would be improvised based on the location. "King Herod's Song" and "Superstar" were the only ones that had their locations planned before production commenced. The abandoned Nabataean city of Avdat was used for the scenes with the priests.

Alex Thomson was the original director of photography, but during the first week of principal photography he was seriously injured after falling from a camera crane. He was swiftly replaced by veteran cinematographer Douglas Slocombe, whose work on the film was nominated for a BAFTA Award.

For most of the actors, who were secular hippies, filming the musical submerged them in the religious setting. During breaks, they played the concept album loudly, read Aquarian Gospel of Jesus the Christ (1908), and had volleyball matches with teams named "Judas" and "Jesus". The 46-year-old Jewison, when not filming, rarely interacted with the cast members. Neeley wrote that, during filming of the crucifixion, the cast felt like they were walking on the path Christ took, and cried at Neeley's performance on the cross.

=== Alterations ===
Like the stage show, the film gave rise to controversy even with changes made to the script. Some of the lyrics were changed for the film. The reprise of "Everything's Alright", sung before the song "I Don't Know How to Love Him" by Mary to Jesus, was abridged, leaving only the closing lyric "Close your eyes, close your eyes and relax, think of nothing tonight" intact, while the previous lyrics were omitted, including Jesus' "And I think I shall sleep well tonight." In a scene where a group of beggars and lepers overwhelms Jesus, "Heal yourselves!" was changed to "Leave me alone!" Caiaphas' line "What you have done will be the saving of Israel" in the song "Judas' Death", was changed to: "What you have done will be the saving of everyone."

The lyrics of "Trial Before Pilate" contain some notable alterations and additions. Jesus' line "There may be a kingdom for me somewhere, if I only knew" is changed to "if you only knew." The film version also gives Pilate more lines (first used in the original Broadway production) in which he addresses the mob with contempt when they invoke the name of Caesar: "What is this new/Respect for Caesar?/Till now this has been noticeably lacking!/Who is this Jesus? Why is he different?/You Jews produce messiahs by the sackful!" and "Behold a man/Behold your shattered king/You hypocrites!/You hate us more than him!" These lines for Pilate have since been in every production of the show.

The soundtrack contains two songs that are not on the original concept album. "Then We Are Decided", in which the troubles and fears of Annas and Caiaphas regarding Jesus are better developed, is original to the film. The soundtrack also retains the song "Could We Start Again Please?" which had been added to the Broadway show and to stage productions. Most of the other changes have not been espoused by later productions and recordings, although most productions tend to retain the expanded version of "Trial Before Pilate".

== Reception ==
=== Context ===
1972–1973 was a period of purportedly declining interest in religion worldwide, but also filled with movies with religious themes, such as Jesus Christ Superstar, Godspell, Gospel Road: A Story of Jesus, The Holy Mountain, Brother Sun, Sister Moon, Siddhartha, Greaser's Palace, Marjoe, and The Exorcist. Ellis Nassour and Richard Broderick, writing a book on the musical's history published the year of the film's release, declared 1973 to be "a year of Jesus films" not shot in Hollywood, such as the New York City-filmed Godspell, the Tunisia-shot The Rebel Jesus, and the Holy Land-filmed Gospel Road: A Story of Jesus. David W. Pomeroy, in a piece for Theology Today, attributed the trend to studios capitalizing on counter-cultural spirit movements, such as the Jesus movement. The 1970s decade also saw Jesus films become more flamboyant in works like Jesus Christ Superstar, Godspell, and Monty Python's Life of Brian (1979). Nassour and Broderick noted Gospel Road, Jesus Christ Superstar, and Godspell in particular, deviated from the Cecil B. DeMille drama style typical of earlier mainstream religious films.

=== Box office ===
Jesus Christ Superstar grossed $24.5 million ($161.3 million in 2022) at the box office and earned North American rentals of $10.8 million ($71.1 million in 2022) in 1973, against an estimated production budget of $3.5 million. It was the highest-grossing musical in the United States and Canada for the year.

=== Critical response ===
On Rotten Tomatoes, the film has an approval rating of 50% based on 30 reviews, with an average rating of 6/10. The website's critics consensus reads: "Jesus Christ Superstar has too much spunk to fall into sacrilege, but miscasting and tonal monotony halts this musical's groove." On Metacritic, the film has a weighted average score of 64 out of 100 based on 7 critics, indicating "generally favorable" reviews.

Roger Ebert gave the film three stars out of four, calling it "a bright and sometimes breathtaking retelling" of the source material. He praised it as an improved version of the "commercial shlock" of the source material, "being light instead of turgid" and "outward-looking instead of narcissistic". He applauded the portrayal of Jesus as "human, strong and reachable", only achieved elsewhere by The Gospel According to St. Matthew (1964) and The Last Temptation of Christ (1988).

Conversely, Howard Thompson of The New York Times wrote, "Broadway and Israel meet head on and disastrously in the movie version of the rock opera Jesus Christ Superstar, produced in the Biblical locale. The mod-pop glitter, the musical frenzy and the neon tubing of this super-hot stage bonanza encasing the Greatest Story are now painfully magnified, laid bare and ultimately patched beneath the blue, majestic Israeli sky, as if by a natural judgment." Arthur D. Murphy of Variety wrote that the film "in a paradoxical way is both very good and very disappointing at the same time. The abstract film concept ... veers from elegantly simple through forced metaphor to outright synthetic in dramatic impact." Gene Siskel of the Chicago Tribune gave the film two-and-a-half stars out of four and called the music "more than fine," but found the character of Jesus "so confused, so shapeless, the film cannot succeed in any meaningful way." Siskel also agreed with the accusations of the film being antisemitic. Charles Champlin of the Los Angeles Times wrote, "The faults are relative, the costs of an admirable seeking after excellence, and the many strong scenes, visually and dramatically, in 'Superstar' have remarkable impact: the chaos of the temple, the clawing lepers, the rubrics of the crucifixion itself." Gary Arnold of The Washington Post panned the film as "a work of kitsch" that "does nothing for Christianity except to commercialize it."

=== Response from religious groups ===
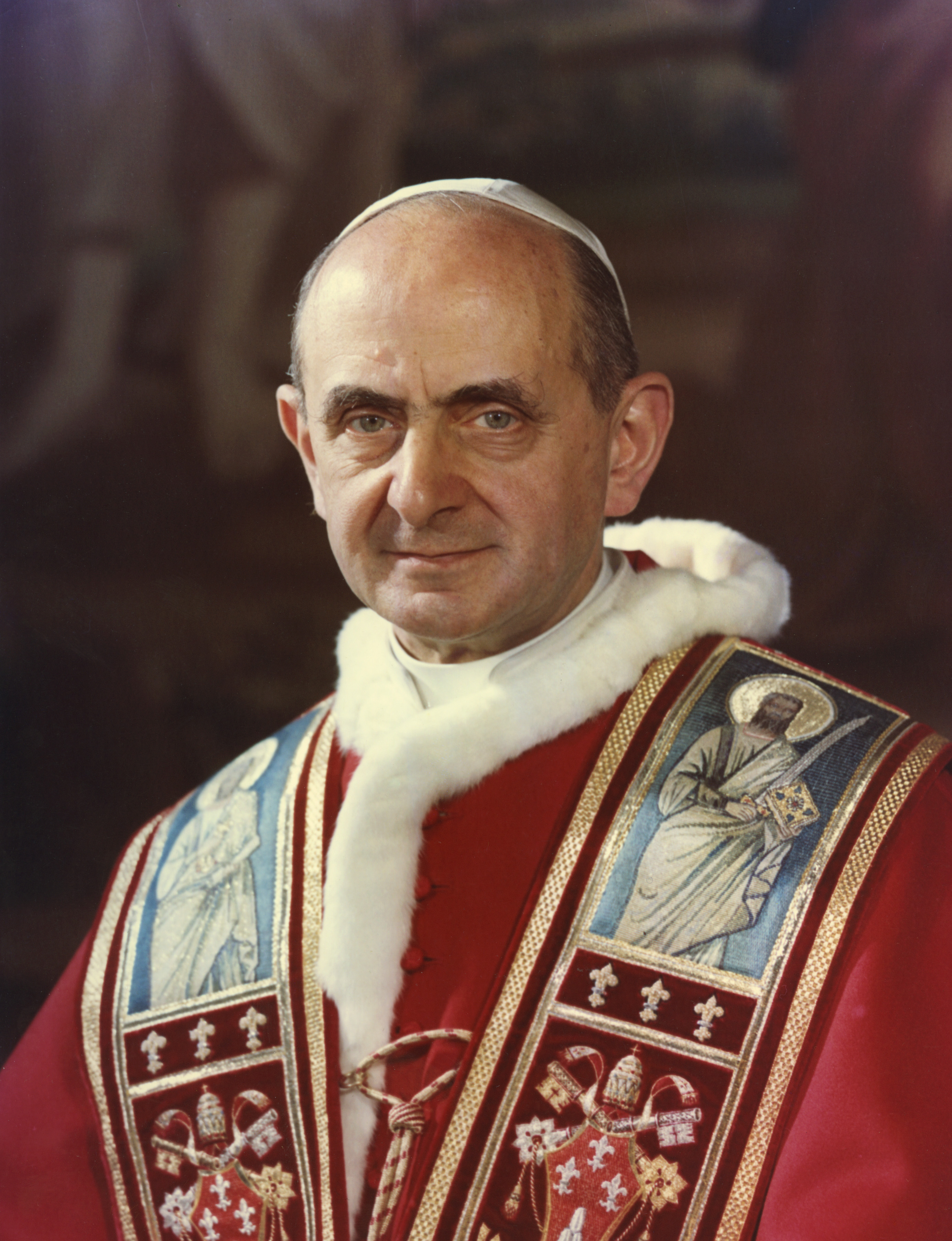
Pope Paul VI praised the film and suggested it would bring more people to Christianity.

Jewison was able to show the film to Pope Paul VI. Ted Neeley later remembered that the pope "openly loved what he saw. He said, 'Mr. Jewison, not only do I appreciate your beautiful rock opera film, I believe it will bring more people around the world to Christianity than anything ever has before.'" For the Pope, Mary Magdalene's song "I Don't Know How to Love Him" "had an inspired beauty". Nevertheless, the film as well as the musical were criticized by some religious groups. As a New York Times article reported, "When the stage production opened in October 1971, it was criticized not only by some Jews as anti-Semitic, but also by some Catholics and Protestants as blasphemous in its portrayal of Jesus as a young man who might even be interested in sex". A few days before the film version's release, the National Jewish Community Relations Advisory Council described it as an "insidious work" that was "worse than the stage play" in dramatizing "the old falsehood of the Jews' collective responsibility for the death of Jesus", and said it would revive "religious sources of anti-Semitism". Jewison argued in response that the film "never was meant to be, or claimed to be an authentic or deep theological work".

Tim Rice said Jesus was seen through Judas' eyes as a mere human being. Some Christians found this remark, as well as the fact that the musical did not show the resurrection, to be blasphemous. While the actual resurrection was not shown, the closing scene of the movie subtly alludes to the resurrection (though, according to Jewison's commentary on the DVD release, the scene was not planned this way). Biblical purists pointed out a small number of deviations from biblical text as additional concerns; for example, Pilate himself having the dream instead of his wife, and Catholics argue the line "for all you care, this bread could be my body" is too Protestant in theology, although Jesus does say in the next lines, "This is my blood you drink. This is my body you eat."

=== Accolades ===
Award	Category	Nominees	Result	Ref.
Academy Awards	Best Scoring: Original Song Score and Adaptation or Scoring: Adaptation	André Previn, Herbert W. Spencer, and Andrew Lloyd Webber	Nominated	
British Academy Film Awards	Best Cinematography	Douglas Slocombe	Nominated	
British Academy Film Awards	Best Costume Design	Yvonne Blake	Nominated	
British Academy Film Awards	Best Soundtrack	Les Wiggins, Gordon McCallum, and Keith Grant	Won	
British Academy Film Awards	United Nations Award	Norman Jewison	Nominated	
British Society of Cinematographers Awards	Best Cinematography in a Theatrical Feature Film	Douglas Slocombe	Won	
David di Donatello Awards	Best Foreign Film	Norman Jewison	Won	
Golden Globe Awards	Best Motion Picture – Musical or Comedy		Nominated	
Golden Globe Awards	Best Actor in a Motion Picture – Musical or Comedy	Carl Anderson	Nominated	
Golden Globe Awards	Best Actor in a Motion Picture – Musical or Comedy	Ted Neeley	Nominated	
Golden Globe Awards	Best Actress in a Motion Picture – Musical or Comedy	Yvonne Elliman	Nominated	
Golden Globe Awards	Most Promising Newcomer – Male	Carl Anderson	Nominated	
Golden Globe Awards	Most Promising Newcomer – Male	Ted Neeley	Nominated	
NAACP Image Awards	Outstanding Actor in a Motion Picture	Carl Anderson	Nominated	
NAACP Image Awards	Outstanding Actress in a Motion Picture	Yvonne Elliman	Nominated	
Valladolid International Film Festival	Golden Spike	Norman Jewison	Nominated	

In the 1980 book The Golden Turkey Awards by Michael Medved and Harry Medved, Neeley was given "an award" for "The Worst Performance by an Actor as Jesus Christ". Neeley went on to reprise the role in numerous national tours of the show.

Years later the film was still popular, winning a 2012 Huffington Post competition for "Best Jesus Movie."

== Soundtrack ==
The film's soundtrack was released on vinyl by MCA Records in 1973. It was re-released on CD in 1993 and reissued in 1998 for its 25th anniversary. The soundtrack for the film is a new recording, different from the 1970 album, despite sharing some performers.

Side one

1. "Overture" – 5:26
2. "Heaven on Their Minds" – 4:22
3. "What's the Buzz" – 2:36
4. "Strange Thing Mystifying" – 1:52
5. "Then We Are Decided" – 2:32
6. "Everything's Alright" – 3:36
7. "This Jesus Must Die" – 3:45

Side two

8. "Hosanna" – 2:55
9. "Simon Zealotes" – 4:52
10. "Poor Jerusalem" – 1:38
11. "Pilate's Dream" – 1:45
12. "The Temple" – 5:26
13. "I Don't Know How to Love Him" – 3:55
14. "Damned for All Time/Blood Money" – 4:37

Side three

1. "The Last Supper" – 7:12
2. "Gethsemane (I Only Want to Say)" – 5:39
3. "The Arrest" – 3:15
4. "Peter's Denial" – 1:26
5. "Pilate and Christ" – 2:57
6. "King Herod's Song" – 3:13

Side four

7. "Could We Start Again, Please?" – 2:44
8. "Judas' Death" – 4:38
9. "Trial Before Pilate (Including the 39 Lashes)" – 6:47
10. "Superstar" – 3:56
11. "The Crucifixion" – 2:40
12. "John Nineteen Forty-One" – 2:20

=== Charts ===
Chart (1973–74)	Peak
Australian Albums (Kent Music Report)	25
Dutch Albums (Album Top 100)	1

== Legacy ==
Hyupsung University's Dr. Jayhoon Yang said that "Jewison and Bragg's Jesus Christ Superstar has its own creativity, bringing the Jesus film business a fresh inspiration and a new break-through." According to Jaime Clark-Soles, Jesus Christ Superstar "continues to captivate and provoke viewers", with perspectives ranging from it being a "mere cultural artifact", to being "a political statement that still enjoys some relevance", to being "an existential journey of sorts".

Atom Egoyan, an Armenian-Canadian director most known for The Sweet Hereafter (1997), repeatedly viewed Jesus Christ Superstar at the Haida Cinema in Victoria, British Columbia. As he explained, its cinematography and production design was a learning experience for him: "The way the camera is moving, the way it moves in time to the music, the way the film is cut, the production design, the framing device … it was just brilliantly conceived as this pageant within a film."

=== Academic analysis ===
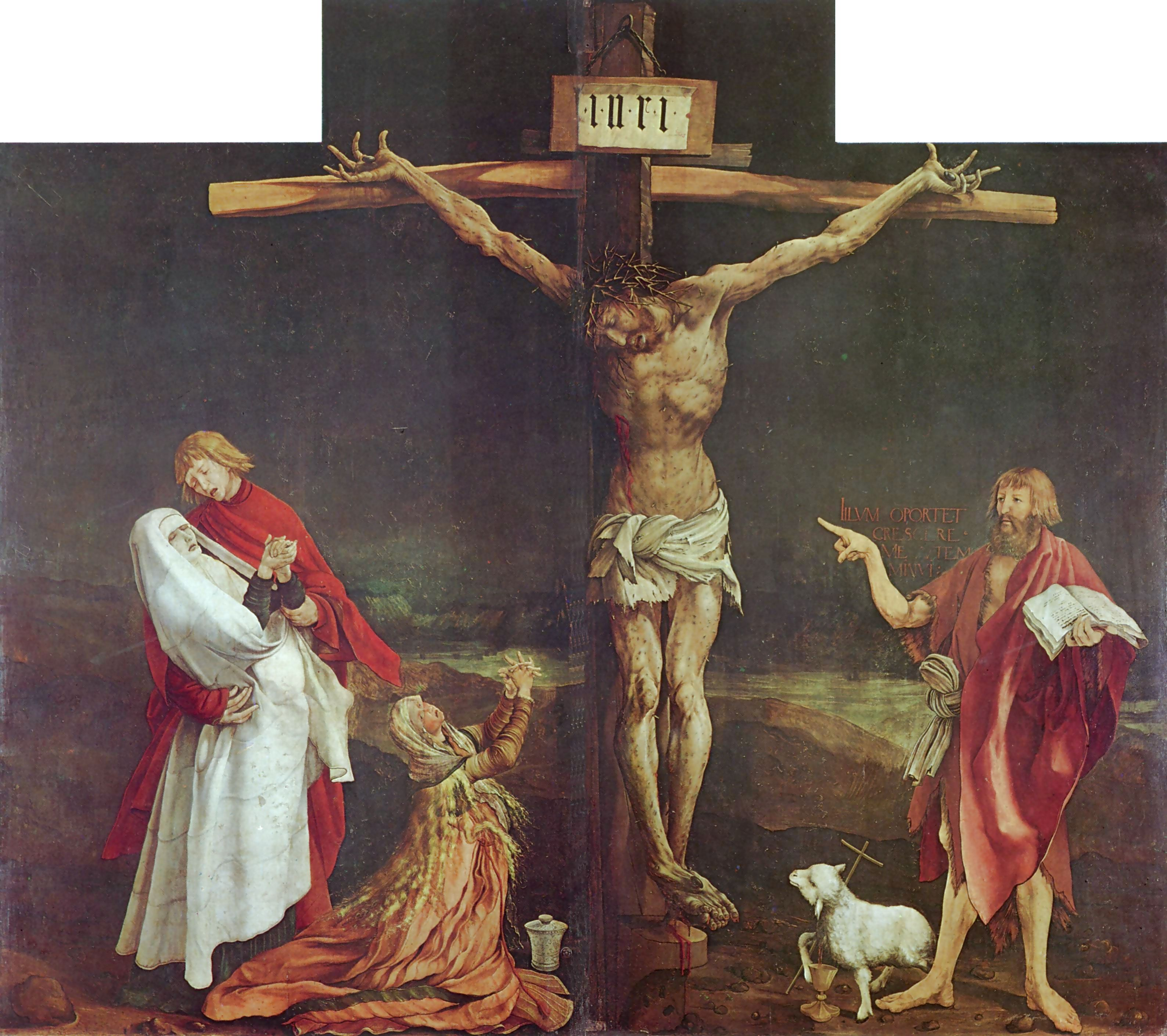
During the "Gethsemane" scene, a presentation of various paintings of Jesus Christ on the cross flash on screen, such as the works of Goya, Tintoretto, Velázquez, Grünewald, and Bosch. This is Grünewald's painting The Crucifixion (c. 1512–1516).

Jesus Christ Superstar is a passion narrative that follows most closely the Gospel of Mark's portrayal of the story. In addition to the introduction reflecting 1:4 of the Gospel of Mark in terms of foreshadowing the crucifixion, the screenplay encompasses many themes of Mark, such as "way (Greek: ὁδός, hodos)", "blindness of the disciples", "servanthood" and "thinking the things of God".

The film mostly focuses on the conflict of its characters, especially Jesus and Judas. The characterisation is either not based on the Gospels or formed from composite characters from various gospels; Judas, for example, is derived from both the Gospel of Matthew and Gospel of John's portrayals of him. Mary's character, on the other hand, is different from any scripture, "a mulatto whore who is a site of contest between two alpha males", wrote Clark-Soles.

Judas plays the role which Satan symbolically had in the Gospels, as an opposition to Jesus' mission. This is symbolized by Judas wearing red and Jesus wearing a light robe. Within the 1970s context of the film's release, Judas is a revolutionary who is part of a grassroots movement against "the man" of society, his pragmatism rendered in his worries about the movement getting carried away. However, he is confused, which opens the door for the priesthood to take advantage of his sympathy for the downtrodden.

Jesus also quarrels with the Apostles, who are portrayed as self-absorbed, only enjoying their association with a sacrificial figure like Jesus, as they sing at the last supper, "always hoped that I'd be an apostle / Knew that I would make it if I tried / Then when we retire we can write the gospels / So they'll still talk about us when we've died".

A highlight for critics and scholars is the human presentation of the biblical figures, particularly Jesus. Clark-Soles summarized: "[the film] helps us to imagine these people as real people, with mixed motives, bodies that sweat, yearn for sex, get sleepy after too much wine, and die". Jesus is seen as impatient, tortured, and irritated, lashing at the Apostles for being "so shallow, thick and slow" in one scene. In public meetings, he gives appreciative looks at the crowd; however, in one instance where the Romans enter in the middle of a dance sequence, Jesus' mood switches and sings, "Neither you Simon, nor the 50,000; nor the Romans, nor the Jews; nor Judas, nor the twelve, nor the priests, nor the scribes, nor doomed Jerusalem itself; understand what power is, understand what glory is, understand at all, understand at all". Following "The Temple" sequence, he encounters an overwhelming number of those needing to be healed, and is only able to heal a few of them. The turning point for Jesus is "Gethsemane", where he laments that he has become "sad and tired" after being "inspired" to form a movement, and lashes out at God: "Show me there's a reason for your wanting me to die […] Watch me die. See how I die."

Kim Paffenroth felt Judas and Mary had the most depth of all characters, even more than Jesus: "their songs are haunting or jarring, and their depictions are passionate, much more so even than the depiction of Jesus, who seems rather too passive, confused, and weak."

Jesus Christ Superstar is one of Jewison's many productions to have betrayal as a primary theme. Another major theme is religious authorities colluding with the government for greed. The Romans, focusing on keeping their state together, crucify Jesus after noticing his challenges to the political, economic and religious establishment, such as Jesus destroying modern paraphernalia sold at "The Temple".

Jesus Christ Superstar is different from other Jesus films in terms of its lack of fidelity to, as well as modernization of, the original Bible text in terms of costumes, staging and behavior. Jesus Christ Superstar has most of its characters reflect the hippie movement and youth culture of the 1960s and 1970s in terms of their dances and contemporaneous dresses, apart from the garb-wearing titular character. There is tension created in the film's implication that social issues prevalent in the era of Jesus are still important in the present. The opening depicts the cast riding a bus, with Arabic and Hebrew language on it alluding to the Six-Day War, and excitedly carrying the cross out of the bus. The market in "The Temple" has ancient goods such as birds and sheep sold alongside mirrors, weapons, grenades, guns, and drugs, as well as prostitutes performing modern dance moves in contemporary 70s dress.

Although interpreting biblical scripture to comment on contemporaneous political social issues is a common aspect of religious films, Jesus Christ Superstar is one of few to encompass several subjects at once. There is an anti-war and Vietnam War sentiment, with machine-gun-armed soldiers in military uniform, thieves trading grenades, machine guns and drugs, and Judas encountering tanks and fighter jets. The Israeli locations were interpreted by Paul V. M. Flesher and Robert Torry as referencing the Mideast conflict. The use of a black actor for Judas adds a civil rights movement component, most displayed in his suicide where he hangs himself with a rope on a tree, reminiscent of the lynchings associated with the era. Clark-Soles analyzed race as playing "a crucial, if ambiguous, role in the film", as a white actor and a black actor portray figures who, in the first century, were of the same Jewish race. In "Heaven On Their Minds", Judas asks Jesus, "Do you care for your race?"

== Remakes and related productions ==
In a 2008 interview with Variety magazine, film producer Marc Platt stated that he was in discussions with several filmmakers for a remake of Jesus Christ Superstar.

In 2013, a Blu-ray "40th Anniversary" edition of the film was released, featuring commentary from the director and Ted Neeley, an interview with Tim Rice, a photo gallery and a clip of the original trailer.

In 2015, Neeley announced the upcoming release of a documentary entitled Superstars: The Making of and Reunion of the film 'Jesus Christ Superstar' about the production of the film.

== See also ==
- Great Performances, of which one of its many episodes was an adaptation of the musical, release direct-to-video in 2000
- List of 1970s films based on actual events
- List of American films of 1973
- Godspell, another 1970s stage musical depicting Jesus
  - Godspell, a film adaptation released a couple months earlier
