= Barry Dennen =

American actor (1938–2017)

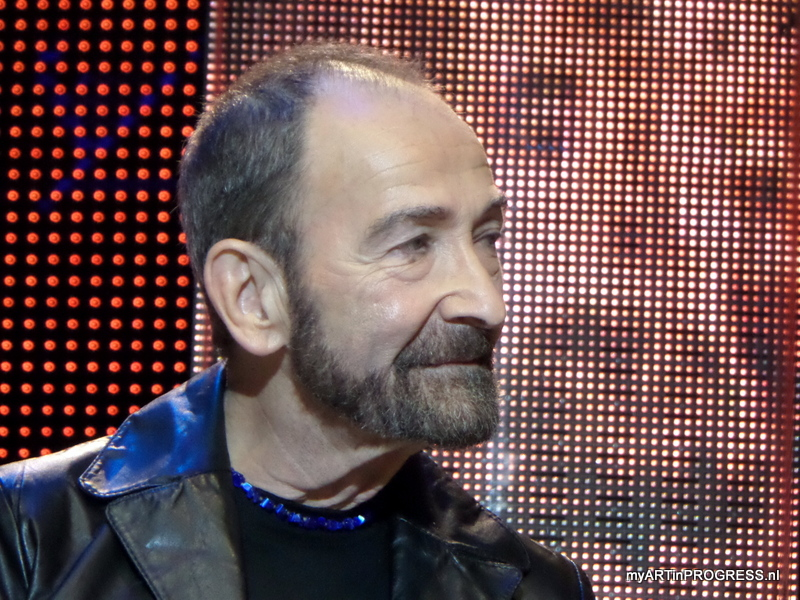
- Dennen at a performance of Jesus Christ Superstar of May 6, 2017
- Born: February 22, 1938; Chicago, Illinois, U.S.
- Died: September 26, 2017 (aged 79); Burbank, California, U.S.
- Resting place: Hollywood Forever Cemetery
- Occupations: Actor; writer
- Years active: 1966–2017

Barry Dennen (February 22, 1938 – September 26, 2017) was an American actor and writer. He is best known for playing Pontius Pilate on the original 1970 recording of Jesus Christ Superstar as well as the subsequent 1971 stage musical and 1973 film adaptation. He also appeared in notable films including Fiddler on the Roof, The Shining, Shock Treatment, Titanic, and performed the voice of the Skeksis Chamberlain in The Dark Crystal.

== Early life ==
Barry Dennen was born in Chicago, Illinois, on February 22, 1938.

== Career ==
He moved to London for 15 years and in 1968 landed the starring role of the master of ceremonies in the London West End version of Cabaret. In 1970, he played Pontius Pilate on the album of Jesus Christ Superstar, and he played the same role in the Broadway production (1971). In the same year, he played Mendel in Norman Jewison's film of Fiddler on the Roof. According to Dennen's website, he suggested to Jewison that he direct a film version of Jesus Christ Superstar. Jewison did so, and Dennen played Pilate again (1973).

Dennen also played a variety of small parts on American television shows including: Batman; Wonder Woman (where he portrayed a clone of Adolf Hitler); Galtar and the Golden Lance; Tales from the Darkside and Justice League: Throne of Atlantis; and films, such as Madhouse (1974); Brannigan (1975); The Kentucky Fried Movie (1977); The Shining (1980); Ragtime (1981); Trading Places (1983); Superman III (1983); Twin Sitters (1994) and Titanic (1997). He also played the used auto dealer Irwin Lapsey in Shock Treatment (1981). In 1982, Dennen played the role of Buddy in the TV adaptation of Beau Geste.

Dennen also ventured into voice acting. His most notable voice role was dubbing Frank Oz as the villainous Chamberlain SkekSil in The Dark Crystal (1982). He also notably voiced the character Tulku in The Shadow (1994). His notable work for animation included DuckTales, Batman: The Animated Series, The Pirates of Dark Water, Animaniacs, Avatar: The Last Airbender and Star Wars: The Clone Wars. He also did voices for many video games, including Fatman in Metal Gear Solid 2: Sons of Liberty; Hjollder in Icewind Dale: Heart of Winter; Master Li in Jade Empire; Police Chief Bogen in Grim Fandango; Mimir in the video game Too Human; Dean Domino in Fallout: New Vegas expansion Dead Money, The Dark One in The Mark of Kri; the Kangxi Emperor in Age of Empires III: The Asian Dynasties; Benedict Burgess Batteric III in Infinity Blade III; Chaos Knight, Phantom Lancer, and Rubick in Dota 2; and the venerable Odo and meister Glimmerheim in Dungeon Siege III.

In 1984, Dennen wrote the lyrics for the children's musical revue Wanna Play?!, which was produced in Kansas City and later produced on television twice. The show, written with writer Linda Bergman and composer Jeff Rizzo, is licensed by Samuel French. He wrote the screenplay for an episode of Amazing Stories titled "The Secret Cinema" (1985) and cowrote an episode of The Comic Strip Presents... titled "Demonella" (1993).

== Personal life ==
In New York City from 1960 to 1961, he had a platonic relationship with Barbra Streisand. His autobiographical book My Life with Barbra: A Love Story (1997) deals with their relationship and with his gradual realization that he was gay. During the year they lived together, he helped her develop the nightclub act that began her successful career as a singer and actress.

== Death ==
In June 2017, Dennen suffered a fall in his home in Burbank, California, and required hospital care. He never fully recovered and died on September 26, 2017.

== Filmography ==
Film
Year	Title	Role	Notes
1970	The Juggler of Notre Dame	The Juggler	
1971	Fiddler on the Roof	Mendel	
1973	Jesus Christ Superstar	Pontius Pilate	
1974	Madhouse	Gerry Blount	
1975	Brannigan	Julian	
1977	The Kentucky Fried Movie	Claude LaMont	Segment: "High Adventure"
1978	Rabbit Test	Mad Bomber	
1980	The Shining	Bill Watson	
1981	Shock Treatment	Irwin Lapsey	
1981	Ragtime	Stage Manager	
1982	The Dark Crystal	Chamberlain / Podling	Voice
1983	Trading Places	Demitri	
1983	Superman III	Dr. McClean	
1984	Memed, My Hawk	Hikmet	
1984	Not for Publication	Señor Wopperico	
1991	Liquid Dreams	The Major	
1994	Clifford	Terry the Pterodactyl	Voice
1994	The Shadow	Tulku	Voice, uncredited
1994	Twin Sitters	Thomas	
1997	Titanic	Praying Man	
2003	Manhood	Singing Groom	
2014	Heavenly Sword	Flying Fox / Prophet Takashi	Voice
2015	Justice League: Throne of Atlantis	Defense Advisor	Voice
2015	Superstars: The Documentary	Himself/Pontius Pilate	
2016	Alleluia! The Devil's Carnival	Heaven's Denizen	Uncredited

Television
Year	Title	Role	Notes	Source
1968	Batman	Fred	2 episodes	
1976	Monster Squad	Mr. Mephisto	Episode: "Mr. Mephisto"	
1977	The New Adventures of Wonder Woman	Adolf Hitler	Episode: "Anschluss '77"	
1987	Tales from the Darkside	Aldo the Puppeteer	Episode: "No Strings"	
1992	Batman: The Animated Series	Shadow Agent	Voice, episode: "Off Balance"	
1993	Animaniacs	Czar	Voice, episode: "Pavlov's Mice"	
1999	Batman Beyond	Captain	Voice, episode: "Disappearing Inque"	
2006	The Grim Adventures of Billy & Mandy	Geppetto, Blubbery Joe, Salesperson	Voice, 2 episodes	
2006	Avatar: The Last Airbender	General Sung, Additional Voices	2 episodes	
2010–16	The Daltons	Jack Dalton, Peabody	Voice, 191 episodes	
2012	Star Wars: The Clone Wars	King Ramsis Dendup, Citizen, Rebel	Voice, 3 episodes	
2013	Mad	Master Shifu, Gatored Community Announcer	Episode: "POblivion/Umbrellamentary"	
2013	Lego Marvel Super Heroes: Maximum Overload	Mandarin	Voice	

Video games
Year	Title	Role	Notes	Source
1995	Wing Commander IV: The Price of Freedom	Melek		
1998	Grim Fandango	Chief Bogen, 1st Thunder Boy, Blue Casket's Waiter		
1999	Star Trek: Hidden Evil	Adm. Ratok		
2001	Metal Gear Solid 2: Sons of Liberty	Fatman	English Dub	
2001	Icewind Dale: Heart of Winter	Hjollder		
2001	Arcanum: Of Steamworks and Magick Obscura	King Loghaire Thunderstone		
2002	Star Trek: Bridge Commander	Gul Oden, Captain Terrik		
2002	The Mark of Kri	The Dark One		
2003	Lionheart: Legacy Of The Crusader	Goblin King		
2003	Prince of Persia: The Sands of Time	Vizier		
2005	Jade Empire	Master Li		
2005	Fantastic Four	Mole Man		
2007	Law & Order: Criminal Intent	Crime Scene Tech, George Bennett, Frederick Grant, others		
2007	Avatar: The Last Airbender – The Burning Earth	additional voices		
2007	Age of Empires III: The Asian Dynasties	Kangxi Emperor		
2008	Too Human	Mimir		
2009	Dragon Age: Origins	Uldred, Rogek, Senior Enchanter Torrin		
2010	Fallout: New Vegas	Dean Domino	Dead Money DLC	
2011	White Knight Chronicles II	Lorias		
2011	Dungeon Siege III	The Venerable Odo, Mayor Moritz Grimmelhaus, additional voices		
2012	Darksiders II	The Chancellor, Eternal Throne Guard 2, Human Soul 2		
2012	Kingdoms of Amalur: Reckoning	various characters		
2013	Dota 2	Chaos Knight, Phantom Lancer, Rubick		
2013	Infinity Blade III	Benedict Burgess Batteric III		
2014	Lightning Returns: Final Fantasy XIII	Poltae Headman	English dub	
2014	Diablo III: Reaper of Souls	additional voices		
2015	Final Fantasy Type-0 HD	Commandant	English dub	
2016	World of Warcraft: Legion	Valewalker Farodin		
