= Kurt Yaghjian =

American actor

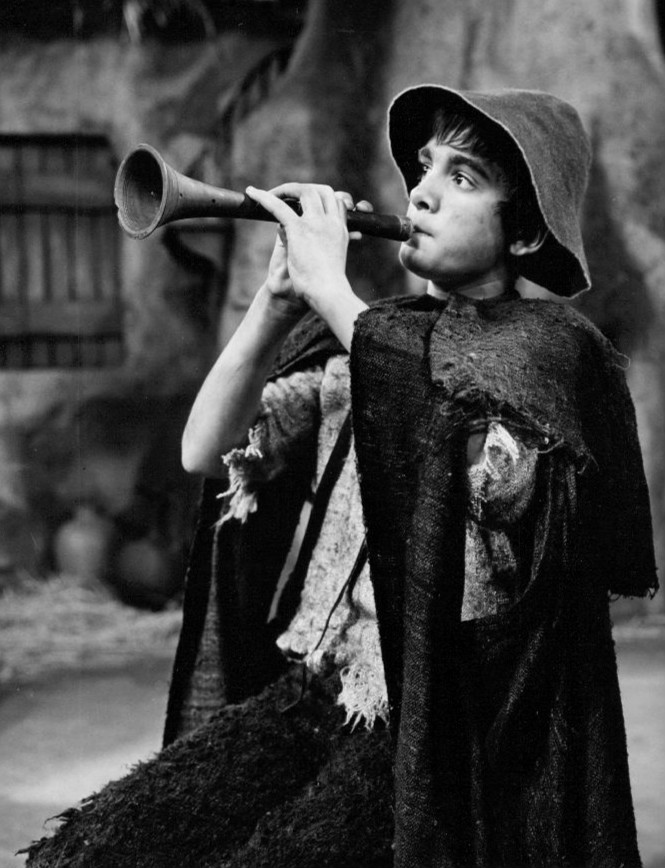
Kurt Yaghjian as Amahl in the video presentation of Amahl and the Night Visitors.

Kurt "Frenchy" Yaghjian (or Yahjian; born February 9, 1951, Detroit) is an Armenian-American actor and singer best known for his appearance as Annas in the 1973 film Jesus Christ Superstar.

== Biography ==
Kurt Yaghjian is the only son of Haig Yaghjian, a former assistant conductor of the Cincinnati Symphony Orchestra. He is of Armenian descent. In 1971 he graduated from North Carolina School of the Arts.

=== Opera ===
Yaghjian was a member of a school choir that participated in the premiere of Gian Carlo Menotti's The Death of the Bishop of Brindisi in May 1963. Menotti was impressed with the expressiveness of Yaghjian's face and recommended him to NBC for the role of Amahl in Amahl and the Night Visitors in 1963, the first time that the production was videotaped, previous versions having been shown live. The videotaped version with Yaghjian was shown annually until 1966.

=== Musical theater ===
==== Jesus Christ Superstar ====
He appeared as a leper and reporter in the original Broadway production of Jesus Christ Superstar, which opened 12 October 1971, also understudying Ben Vereen as Judas Iscariot. He initially auditioned for the original director, Frank Corsaro, but was recalled to re-audition when Tom O'Horgan replaced him following a car accident. Following the opening, due to his vocal range and acting skills, he soon understudied the roles of Annas and Pontius Pilate as well, at one point going on as all three leads in a week.

Following his appearance as Annas in the 1973 film of Superstar, he appeared as Judas in subsequent stage productions, first in an American national tour produced by Hal Zeiger and managed by Steve Leber and David Krebs, who went on to manage Aerosmith, Ted Nugent, and Mahogany Rush during the 1970s, and then in a regional production at the Paper Mill Playhouse in 1977.

==== Other credits ====
In addition to his stints in Superstar, Yaghjian also frequently played the Baker and one of Joseph's brothers in Joseph and the Amazing Technicolor Dreamcoat, once at Playhouse in the Park in Philadelphia and twice at the Brooklyn Academy of Music Opera House, and appeared in the short-lived Off-Off-Broadway musical Duel in 1979, also appearing on its studio cast album released in 2000 by Original Cast Records.

More recently, he has appeared on the concept album for Bob Christianson's sci-fi rock musical Grail and as Santa Bear on the studio recording of The Berenstain Bears Save Christmas: The Musical.

=== Filmography ===
His film and TV appearances include Amahl in the television movie Amahl and the Night Visitors (1963), Annas in Jesus Christ Superstar (1973) (film and soundtrack), and Hair (1979).

=== Music ===
==== Session vocals ====
Yaghjian has sung and/or recorded backing vocals for such diverse artists as Patti Austin, Harry Belafonte, Tony Bennett, Felix Cavaliere, Ray Charles, Dion, Jonathan Edwards, Harvey Fuqua, Cyndi Lauper, John Lennon and Yoko Ono, Darlene Love, Vicki Sue Robinson, Carly Simon, Lonnie Liston Smith, Belouis Some, Ronnie Spector, and Talking Heads. He has also appeared on novelty and children's albums such as The Re-Bops' Jukebox! Party Songs (2000) and Murray Weinstock's Tails of the City (2004).

==== Advertising ====
He has taken part in advertising campaigns for products such as Coca-Cola, Ford Motors, Domino's Pizza, Toyota, Cadillac, Chevrolet, Budweiser and Sprite.

==== Bands ====
From the early 1990s until after the events of September 11, 2001, Yaghjian was in a band called Little Isidore and the Inquisitors. In October 2001 he joined another band called Kenny Vance and the Planotones. In 2014, he became a featured vocalist with Jay Siegel's Tokens.

== See also ==
- This Jesus Must Die
