= Everything's Alright (Jesus Christ Superstar song) =

1970 song by Tim Rice and Andrew Lloyd Webber

Single by Yvonne Elliman, Ian Gillan, Murray Head and Ensemble

from the album Jesus Christ Superstar
- Released: September 1971
- Recorded: 1970
- Studio: Olympic, London
- Genre: Folk rock, art rock
- Length: 5:14
- Label: Decca/MCA
- Composer: Andrew Lloyd Webber
- Lyricist: Tim Rice
- Producers: Andrew Lloyd Webber, Tim Rice

Yvonne Elliman, Ian Gillan, Murray Head and Ensemble singles chronology
"I Don't Know How to Love Him" (1971)	"Everything's Alright" (1971)	"Can't Find My Way Home" (1972)

"Everything's Alright" is a song from the 1970 album and 1971 rock opera Jesus Christ Superstar by Tim Rice and Andrew Lloyd Webber. It is about the anointing of Jesus.

In the song, Mary Magdalene tries to calm Jesus with an expensive ointment and tells him not to get worried. Judas accuses her of wasting resources which would be better served helping the poor. Jesus retorts by saying that there will always be poverty in the world and that they will never be able to help everyone.

The song is musically notable for its 5/4 time signature.

== Single release ==
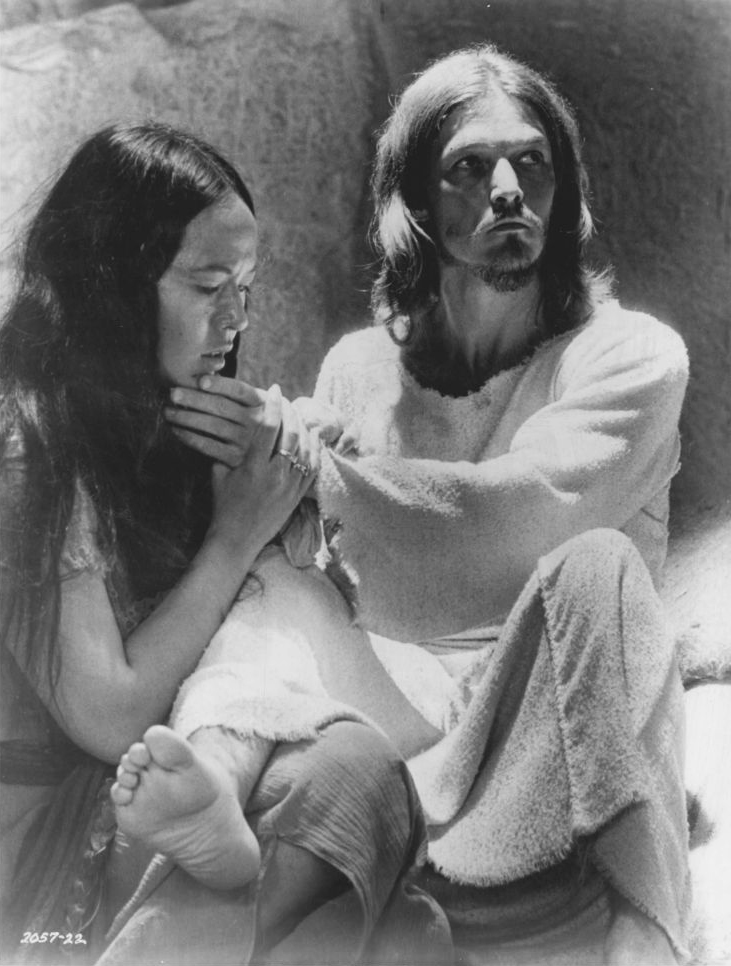
Yvonne Elliman and Ted Neeley sing "Everything's Alright" in the 1973 film Jesus Christ Superstar

Yvonne Elliman, who sang the part of Mary Magdalene on the original rock opera concept album Jesus Christ Superstar and also in the 1971 Broadway original cast and 1973 film, released a single of "Everything's Alright" in 1971, which reached #92 on the Billboard Hot 100.

Cash Box said of it that "Yvonne once again reaches into the wealth of material from the Rice-Webber classic and comes up with a winner every bit as strong as her first 'I Don't Know How To Love Him' disk.

== Everything's Alright (Reprise) ==
The reprise of "Everything's Alright" is sung by Mary Magdalene to calm Jesus after his intense day of negative events, as he goes to sleep. The short, 29 second reprise leads into the hit single, "I Don't Know How to Love Him," which is also sung by Mary Magdalene. In the 1973 film version, only the "Close your Eyes" number is sung, omitting the rest of the lyrics, including the line: "I know that I will sleep well tonight", sung by Jesus.

== John Farnham, Kate Ceberano and Jon Stevens version ==
"Everything's Alright"

Single by John Farnham, Kate Ceberano and Jon Stevens

from the album Jesus Christ Superstar
- B-side: "Overture"
- Released: 13 July 1992
- Studio: Rak (London, England)
- Genre: Pop
- Length: 4:51
- Label: Emerald City; Polydor
- Composer: Andrew Lloyd Webber
- Lyricist: Tim Rice
- Producer: David Hirschfelder

John Farnham singles chronology
"You're the Voice" (live) (1992)	"Everything's Alright" (1992)	"Seemed Like a Good Idea (At the Time)" (1993)

Kate Ceberano singles chronology
"Calling You" (1992)	"Everything's Alright" (1992)	"I Don't Know How to Love Him" (1992)

Jon Stevens singles chronology
"Lover My Lover" (1982)	"Everything's Alright" (1992)	"Superstar" (1992)

John Farnham, Kate Ceberano, and Jon Stevens released a version of "Everything's Alright" in 1992. The song peaked at number six on the Australian ARIA Singles Chart and stayed in the top 10 for five weeks. It spent 14 weeks on the chart and ended the year as Australia's 40th-most-successful single.

=== Track listing ===
1. "Everything's Alright" (4:55)
2. "Overture" (3:51) (by Andrew Lloyd Webber and Tim Rice)

=== Charts ===
==== Weekly charts ====
Chart (1992)	Peak position
Australia (ARIA)	6

==== Year-end charts ====
Chart (1992)	Position
Australia (ARIA)	40

=== Certifications ===
Region	Certification	Certified units/sales
Australia (ARIA)	Gold	35,000^{^}
^{^} Shipments figures based on certification alone.
