= This Jesus Must Die =

Song by Victor Brox and Brian Keith

from the album Jesus Christ Superstar
- Released: September 1970
- Recorded: 1970
- Genre: Art rock
- Length: 5:11
- Label: Decca Records/MCA Records
- Composer(s): Andrew Lloyd Webber
- Lyricist(s): Tim Rice
- Producer(s): Andrew Lloyd Webber, Tim Rice

"This Jesus Must Die" is a song from the 1970 album and 1971 rock opera Jesus Christ Superstar by Tim Rice and Andrew Lloyd Webber, which also appears in the film versions of Jesus Christ Superstar, and on the original album of the musical. In the song, the priests, led by Caiaphas and Annas, plot to kill Jesus Christ, whose teachings they believe will result in a Roman crackdown against its Jewish population.

In the 1973 film, it is sung primarily by Bob Bingham as Caiaphas and Kurt Yaghjian as Annas; and on the 1970 album, by Victor Brox as Caiaphas and Brian Keith as Annas, with Paul Raven and Tim Rice providing the voices of the priests. In the 2000 film, it is sung by Frederick B. Owens as Caiaphas and Michael Shaeffer as Annas.

== Synopsis ==
According to the official Jesus Christ Superstar website, in the song:

Caiaphas and the Priests discuss the problems caused by the mob following Jesus. They don't understand how he has managed to inspire people and believe that Jesus poses a very serious threat to their authority and the fragile relationship they have with the occupying force from Rome.

The song begins with the Jewish priests fretting over the influence of the "rabble-rousing" Jesus, but merely plotting to have him arrested. It is Caiaphas who insists that the threat posed by a Roman crackdown, "our elimination, because of one man", can only be averted by the death of Jesus, which would deliver a demoralizing blow to his followers.

== Analysis ==
The song is noted for, after a slow beginning, launching into more of a "rock and roll" feel than many other songs in the musical, and being sung by a "growling bass-voiced Caiaphas and his screechy tenor minions". The song has also been described as "a throwback to pre-Second World War depictions" of "threatening Jews", although "their evil is somewhat modified". The priests sing a melody that comes from J. S. Bach's Bourrée in E minor.

Rather than the self-interested, conspiratorial priests of the Gospel of Mark or DeMille's The King of Kings, Superstar's priests decide that "this Jesus must die ...for the sake of the nation". Their intention to avert a murderous crackdown on the Jewish people reflects the representation of the high priest in the last canonical gospel—John.

The appearance of the song in the musical and in the film version of Jesus Christ Superstar is highlighted by an "emphasis on style". The film uses "low camera angles which give a distorted view of the priests", and "gives the priests extraordinary costumes", which includes "enormous, bizarrely shaped hats", black flowing robes, and "bare chests crossed by leather straps and chains".
