= Jesus Christ Superstar (album) =

1970 rock opera album

- Original UK cover

Studio album by various artists
- Released: 16 October 1970 (UK); 27 October 1970 (US)
- Recorded: 10 October 1969 ("Superstar" single), March–July 1970
- Studios: Olympic, London
- Genres: Art rock; progressive rock
- Length: 86:56
- Label: Decca/MCA/Decca Broadway
- Producers: Tim Rice, Andrew Lloyd Webber

Andrew Lloyd Webber and Tim Rice chronology
Jesus Christ Superstar (1970)	Evita (1976)

Singles from Jesus Christ Superstar
- 1. "Superstar" Released: 21 November 1969; 2. "I Don't Know How to Love Him" Released: 13 May 1971

Alternative cover
- US edition cover, May 1971

Professional ratings
Review scores
Source	Rating
AllMusic	4.5/5 stars
Christgau's Record Guide	C−

Jesus Christ Superstar is a 1970 album musical written by Andrew Lloyd Webber and Tim Rice, and the debut of the rock opera of the same name. Initially unable to get backing for a stage production, the composers released it as an album, the success of which led to stage productions premiering in 1971. The musical dramatises the Passion of Jesus, beginning with his entry into Jerusalem and ending with the crucifixion. It was originally banned by the BBC on grounds of being "sacrilegious". By 1983, the album had sold over seven million copies worldwide.

== Composition ==
Lloyd Webber and Rice had earlier success with Joseph and the Amazing Technicolor Dreamcoat. Then, according to Lloyd Webber, the Dean of St Paul's, Martin Sullivan, suggested they do the story of Jesus next. "Tim and I rather resisted it," Lloyd Webber said, "but then Tim came up with this interesting angle. What if we told the story from Judas Iscariot's perspective?"

Lyrics in the 1964 Bob Dylan song "With God on Our Side" resonated with Rice: "You'll have to decide / Whether Judas Iscariot had God on his side." Another inspiration was an advertisement showing Tom Jones dressed in white with the word 'SUPERSTAR' emblazoned across him.

Rice and Lloyd Webber wrote the title song, Superstar, first, in July 1969. Lloyd Webber explained, “It was agreed that we would first sort of ‘send up a flag' to see whether the public would accept our approach to the subject." They spent the next four months producing the single. They wrote the rest of the songs from November 1969 to March 1970.

The album's story is based in large part on the Bible and Fulton J. Sheen's Life of Christ. Rice said, "I used the King James and Catholic versions—whichever was handier—interchangeably. My biggest aid was Fulton Sheen's Life of Christ, in which Bishop Sheen calibrates and compares the Gospels." However, greater emphasis is placed on the interpersonal relationships of the major characters, in particular, Jesus, Judas, and Mary Magdalene, relationships that are not described in depth in the Gospels.

"Herod's Song" is a lyrical rewrite of "Try It and See", previously written by Lloyd Webber and Rice as a proposed British entry into the Eurovision Song Contest 1969 to be sung by Lulu, then recorded and released as a single by Rita Pavone. The writers had also included it (as "Those Saladin Days") in an aborted show about Richard the Lionheart called Come Back Richard Your Country Needs You.

The melody of "I Don't Know How to Love Him" also predates Jesus Christ Superstar; it was rewritten from a 1968 Lloyd Webber/Rice collaboration titled "Kansas Morning".

== Recording ==
The album was recorded from March to July 1970. For the recording, Lloyd Webber and Rice drew personnel from both musical theatre (Murray Head had just left the West End production of Hair) and the British rock scene (Ian Gillan had only recently become the singer of Deep Purple). Many of the primary musicians—guitarists Neil Hubbard and Henry McCullough, bassist Alan Spenner, and drummer Bruce Rowland—came from Joe Cocker's backing group The Grease Band. Saxophonist Chris Mercer had also played with Hubbard in Juicy Lucy.

== Release ==
The first piece of Superstar released was the title song, as a single in November 1969 backed with the instrumental "John Nineteen Forty-One" (see John 19:41). The full album followed almost a year later.

In the U.S., the double album was released on 27 October 1970. Less than three weeks later, on 16 November, it achieved gold status ($1 million in sales).

The album topped the U.S. Billboard Top LP's chart in both February and May 1971 and ranked number one in the year-end chart ahead of Carole King's massive hit Tapestry. It also served as a launching pad for numerous stage productions on Broadway and in the West End. The original 1970 boxed-set issue of this two-record set was packaged in the U.S. with a special thin brown cardboard outer box ("The Brown Album") which contained the two vinyl records and a 28-page libretto.

== Reception ==
Hubert Saal, in Newsweek, called it "nothing short of brilliant—and reverent. Staying well within limits prescribed by the Gospels, the opera galvanizes the story and the scenes of the Passion with its own fresh imagination and vitality." Critic John Rockwell, writing in the Los Angeles Times, thought, "...at its best, Jesus works. Rice and Weber have managed more effectively than the composers of any previous rock-opera that I know of to characterize individuals in both words and music. And they are helped by an excellent cast." Billboard's critic wrote, "This brilliant musical portrayal of the last seven days of Jesus is destined to become one of the most talked about and provocative albums on the pop scene. Music critic Thomas Willis wrote in the Chicago Tribune, "I am neither a theologian nor a rock critic, but if Jesus Christ Superstar isn't the most important religious music of the year—and one of two or three significant recordings of the decade—I am sadly mistaken." He added, "The ingredients in this unique production are absolutely first rate." Nat Hentoff, in Cosmopolitan, called it "the most remarkable large-scale rock work yet created" and called the singers "superbly cast."

Other critics unfavourably compared it to the Who's Tommy: Variety thought, "Somewhat overstated, the opera lacks the overall impact of Tommy." Mike Jahn, in the Baltimore Sun, went further: "Tommy seemed a labor of love, with good stories well-told...In comparison, Jesus Christ Superstar seems a labor of opportunism with almost no inspiration. In fact, when it isn't dead boring it's embarrassing..."

== Reissues ==
=== 2CD reissue ===
Original Concept Recording. Jesus Christ Superstar – A Rock Opera. Universal City, California: MCA Records Inc. [USA], (released 24 September 1996). Cat. No. MCAD2-11542 [2 CDs], UPC 008811154226.

=== 2012 remaster ===
In 2012, the MCA reissue was remastered personally by Andrew Lloyd Webber, who released the result on his own Really Useful Music imprint under the Decca banner. In his liner notes, Lloyd Webber states that he was hoping to find some unreleased recording within the original masters, but he found out that only three out of twenty tapes had survived the 2008 Universal Studios fire, and those tapes did not contain any unreleased material. However, it later turned out that he did possess a copy of the complete masters in his own archive, and he worked from that.

=== 2021 expanded reissue ===
In 2021, for the 50th anniversary of the original staging, Universal Music Group released an expanded reissue (under its Decca Broadway imprint) consisting of 3 CDs and a hardback book. The first two discs contain a new remaster of the original album, made at Abbey Road Studios by staff engineers Miles Showell and Nick Davis; the third disc includes demos, rarities, single edits and more, all sourced from Tim Rice's personal archive. The book includes many photos from the era, an extensive chronicle of the making of the album (compiled by writer Lois Wilson from interviews with Lloyd Webber, Rice, Yvonne Elliman, Murray Head, Ian Gillan and the musicians involved in the album), appreciations by English comedian/musician Matt Berry and Chic founder Nile Rodgers, a facsimile of the lyric book included within the original 1970 album and the script for an "open-end interview" (i.e. a pre-recorded interview with music and gaps for radio DJs and presenters to insert their own voices) with Lloyd Webber and Rice, whose audio part is on the third disc. The artwork for the box set includes both the brown American cover (on the slipcase for the set) and the more colourful British one, on the book itself.

== Track listing ==
All lyrics are written by Tim Rice (libretto and book); all music is composed by Andrew Lloyd Webber.

Side one
No.	Title	Length
1.	"Overture"	4:00
2.	"Heaven on Their Minds"	4:23
3.	"What's the Buzz/Strange Thing Mystifying"	4:13
4.	"Everything's Alright"	4:36
5.	"This Jesus Must Die"	5:11

Side two
No.	Title	Length
1.	"Hosanna"	2:09
2.	"Simon Zealotes/Poor Jerusalem"	4:49
3.	"Pilate's Dream"	1:28
4.	"The Temple"	4:43
5.	"Everything's Alright (reprise)"	0:34
6.	"I Don't Know How to Love Him"	3:41
7.	"Damned for All Time/Blood Money"	4:36

Side three
No.	Title	Length
1.	"The Last Supper"	7:10
2.	"Gethsemane (I Only Want to Say)"	5:33
3.	"The Arrest"	3:24
4.	"Peter's Denial"	1:27
5.	"Pilate and Christ"	2:46
6.	"King Herod's Song"	3:02

Side four
No.	Title	Length
1.	"Judas' Death"	4:17
2.	"Trial Before Pilate (Including the 39 Lashes)"	5:13
3.	"Superstar"	4:16
4.	"The Crucifixion"	4:04
5.	"John Nineteen Forty-One"	2:10

=== Disc three ===
1. "Ascending Chords" (orchestral intro, previously unreleased)
2. "Blood Money" (Tim Rice's guide vocal, previously unreleased)
3. "Herod's Song" (Tim Rice's guide vocal, previously unreleased)
4. "I Don't Know How to Love Him" (Tim Rice and Murray Head vocal, previously unreleased)
5. "I Don't Know How to Love Him" (Murray Head vocal, previously unreleased)
6. "This Jesus Must Die" (Scat vocal, previously unreleased)
7. "What a Party" (deleted song, previously unreleased; sung by Tony Ashton as a host introducing the cast; music later used for "The Arrest")
8. "This Jesus Must Die" (Scat vocal 2, previously unreleased)
9. "Heaven on Their Minds" (instrumental, previously unreleased)
10. "I Don't Know How to Love Him" (single edit)
11. "(Too Much) Heaven on Their Minds" (German single, MCS 3468)
12. "Strange Thing (Mystifying)" (German single, MCS 3468)
13. "Open-End Interview with the Creators of Jesus Christ Superstar - Part One" (includes Superstar, Heaven on Their Minds, I Don't Know How to Love Him)
14. "Open-End Interview with the Creators of Jesus Christ Superstar - Part Two" (includes Gethsemane, Herod's Song, Superstar)
15. "John Nineteen: Forty One" (B-side of MKS 5019)

Note: The A-side of the original UK Superstar single (MKS 5019) is not included here as it is identical to the album version.

== Credits ==
Main players

- Ian Gillan – Jesus Christ
- Murray Head – Judas Iscariot
- Yvonne Elliman – Mary Magdalene
- Victor Brox – Caiaphas, High Priest
- Barry Dennen – Pontius Pilate

Supporting players

- Brian Keith – Annas
- John Gustafson – Simon Zealotes
- Paul Davis – Peter
- Mike d'Abo – King Herod

Other players

- Annette Brox – Maid by the Fire
- Paul Raven – Priest
- P. P. Arnold, Tony Ashton, Tim Rice, Peter Barnfeather, Madeline Bell, Brian Bennett, Lesley Duncan, Kay Garner, Barbara Kay, Neil Lancaster, Alan M. O'Duffy, Terry Saunders – Background vocals
- Choir conducted by Geoffrey Mitchell
- Children's choir conducted by Alan Doggett on "Overture"
- The Trinidad Singers, under the leadership of Horace James, on "Superstar"

Musicians

- Neil Hubbard – electric guitar
- Henry McCullough – electric guitar, acoustic guitar
- Alan Spenner – bass guitar
- Chris Mercer – tenor sax
- J. Peter Robinson – piano, electric piano, organ, positive organ
- Bruce Rowland – drums, percussion

Other musicians

- Norman Cave, Karl Jenkins – piano
- Mick Weaver – piano, organ
- Andrew Lloyd Webber – piano, organ, Moog synthesizer
- Mike Vickers – Moog synthesizer
- Alan Doggett – principal Conductor, Moog synthesizer
- Strings of the City of London Ensemble
- Clive Hicks, Chris Spedding, Louis Stewart, Steve Vaughan – guitar
- Jeff Clyne, Peter Morgan, Alan Weighall – bass guitar
- Harold Beckett, Les Condon, Ian Hamer, Kenny Wheeler – trumpet
- Anthony Brooks, Joseph Castaldini – bassoon
- Andrew McGavin, Douglas Moore, James Brown, Jim Buck Sr., Jim Buck Jr., John Burdon – horns
- Keith Christie, Frank Jones, Anthony Moore – trombone
- Ian Herbert – clarinet
- Chris Taylor, Brian Warren – flute
- Bill LeSage, John Marshall – drums

Production

- Alan O'Duffy – chief engineer

== Charts ==
=== Weekly charts ===
Weekly chart performance for Jesus Christ Superstar
Chart (1970–2005)	Peak position
Australian Albums (Kent Music Report)	6
Austrian Albums (Ö3 Austria)	4
Canada Top Albums/CDs (RPM)	1
Dutch Albums (Album Top 100)	10
German Albums (Offizielle Top 100)	11
New Zealand Albums (RMNZ)	16
Norwegian Albums (VG-lista)	3
Spanish Albums (Promusicae)	73
UK Albums (Official Charts)	6
US Billboard 200	1

=== Year-end charts ===
Year-end chart performance for Jesus Christ Superstar
Chart (1971)	Position
Australian Albums (Kent Music Report)	4
Dutch Albums (Album Top 100)	72
German Albums (Offizielle Top 100)	20
US Billboard 200	1

== Certifications and sales ==
Region	Certification	Certified units/sales
Canada (Music Canada)	Gold	350,000
France	—	60,000
Israel	—	2,500
Italy	—	100,000
Netherlands (NVPI)	Gold	250,000
South Africa (SARI)	Gold	12,500
Sweden	—	90,000
United Kingdom (BPI) 1970 release	Gold	180,000
United States (RIAA)	Gold	4,500,000
Summaries
North America 1970-1972	—	3,500,000
Worldwide	—	7,000,000

== See also ==
- Jesus Christ Superstar (film)
