= Superstar (Jesus Christ Superstar song) =

Single by Murray Head and ensemble

from the album Jesus Christ Superstar
- B-side: "John Nineteen Forty-One"
- Released: 21 November 1969 (UK); 1 December 1969 (US)
- Recorded: 10 October 1969
- Studio: Olympic, Barnes, London
- Genre: Symphonic rock; funk rock
- Length: 4:15
- Label: Decca/MCA
- Composer: Andrew Lloyd Webber
- Lyricist: Tim Rice
- Producers: Andrew Lloyd Webber; Tim Rice

Murray Head and ensemble singles chronology
"Superstar" (1969)	"I Don't Know How to Love Him" (1971)

"Superstar" is the title song from the 1970 album and 1971 rock opera Jesus Christ Superstar written by Andrew Lloyd Webber and Tim Rice.

== Content ==
The song is sung by the spirit of Judas Iscariot, who had died by suicide earlier in the show. The song consists of a series of questions addressed to Jesus, such as why Jesus chose to come to Israel in 4 BC when it had no "mass communication" as opposed to modern times, whether Jesus had planned his own death, whether Jesus knew beforehand that his death would become famous, and whether religious figures such as Buddha and Muhammad are his equals. It is dominated by repeated apologies for asking these questions ("Don't you get me wrong", "I only want to know").

== Versions ==
=== Original Murray Head version ===
"Superstar" was released as a single in 1969, before the album was completed. Sung by Murray Head with the Trinidad Singers, it initially debuted on the U.S. Billboard Hot 100 singles chart for the week ending 31 January 1970, eventually peaking at No. 74 in late February 1970. In Canada it reached No. 33 on its initial release, February 28, 1970.

Nearly one year later, the single re-entered the Hot 100 chart for the week ending 2 January 1971, eventually peaking at No. 60 on the chart in early March 1971. The single then fell off the chart three weeks later, but then almost immediately re-entered the Hot 100 chart a third and final time for the week ending 10 April 1971. It then rapidly climbed the Hot 100 chart during its third chart run, eventually spending two consecutive weeks at its peak position of No. 14 in late May and early June 1971. By 19 June 1971, "Superstar" had spent a total of 30 weeks on the Hot 100. The single also peaked at No. 6 RPM Top Singles chart and No. 2 on the New Zealand charts published by Listener magazine. A video of the song was released to promote the album, with Murray Head and the Trinidad Singers appearing.

==== Recording ====
In order to get the concept album of Jesus Christ Superstar off the ground, Decca/MCA first gave Andrew Lloyd Webber and Tim Rice money to make the single and begin the album. They wanted to release the single first, which caused uproar within the MCA board at the time.

The single was recorded on 8-track equipment at the Olympic Studios in Barnes, London, with Irish 22-year-old Alan O'Duffy as the chief engineer. Lloyd Webber and Rice were backed by MCA and spent a small fortune on the recording, including using a full orchestra and the backing vocals of the Trinidad Singers. The Grease Band, one of the best rhythm sections in the world at that time, were brought in as the foundation of the ensemble.

==== Charts ====
Chart (1969–72)	Peak position
Belgium (Ultratop 50 Flanders)	4
Belgium (Ultratop 50 Wallonia)	20
Canada Top Singles (RPM)	6
Netherlands (Dutch Top 40)	11
New Zealand (Listener)	2
UK Singles Chart	47
US Billboard Hot 100	14
US Cashbox Top 100	8

=== Carl Anderson version ===
When the 1973 film version and its accompanying soundtrack was released, Carl Anderson played Judas. During the scene in the film when the song "Superstar" is played, Anderson was lowered onto the stage by a crane made to look like a star during the song's intro. Ted Neeley as Jesus is shown during the song being lowered onto a cross.

=== Other versions ===
- Canadian trumpeter Nat Raider reached #25 on the Canadian MOR charts with his version, December 18, 1971.
- Laura Osnes, female winner of Grease: You're the One That I Want!, performed the song during the showtunes week.
- Carly Smithson sang the song during the seventh season of American Idol, the week the theme was the music of Andrew Lloyd Webber. Although judge Simon Cowell called it one of his favorite performances of the night, Smithson was eliminated the following results night.
- Lee Mead and Keith Jack performed it as their final duet on the BBC talent series Any Dream Will Do. Mead went on to win the competition, with Jack as runner-up.
- Jodie Prenger and Samantha Barks performed a duet of the song on I'd Do Anything which was highly acclaimed. Prenger went on to win the BBC competition and become Nancy in the West End revival of the musical Oliver!.
- Anastacia performed the song at Concert for Diana on 1 July 2007.
- In 1992, Jon Stevens released a version a single in Australia.
- Slovenian industrial/electronic band Laibach included a reinterpreted version of the song on their 1996 album Jesus Christ Superstars.

== In popular culture ==
- The 1970s ABC Sports TV show The Superstars used the instrumental version of the song as the show's theme song.
- The song's intro was used several times as an entrance theme for various professional wrestlers such as Superstar Billy Graham, Don Muraco and Stone Cold Steve Austin.
- On the eighth episode of the fourth season of Orphan Black, "The Redesign of Natural Objects", the song is sung by Tatiana Maslany, Terra Hazelton, Barbara Johnston, and Anika Johnson. Maslany portrays Alison Hendrix playing the role of Judas, while Hazelton acts as Sarah Stubbs singing a slightly altered verse as Jesus. Johnston and Johnson act as backup singers, singing the part of the Trinidad Singers in the album production. Ryan Blakely, as Reverend Mike, is shown playing the piano. Alison faces a similar dilemma to the one faced by Judas, as she is pressured to betray her sisters to save her husband.
- On the AppleTV+ television series Ted Lasso, season 3, episode 3, the song is used in a sports montage featuring the God-like football player Zava, who joins the AFC Richmond team on a win streak. The song plays as Zava heads a winning goal into the net. Incidentally, the next shot of the montage cuts to the show’s antagonist Rupert Mannion, played by Anthony Head, cursing his TV watching the game. Coincidentally, Anthony’s brother Murray Head played Judas in the original cast recording and Broadway production.
