= Ted Neeley =

American singer, actor, producer (born 1943)

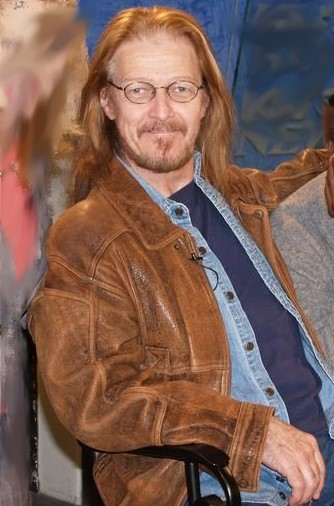
- Neeley in 2008
- Born: Teddie Joe Neeley; September 20, 1943 (age 82); Ranger, Texas, U.S.
- Occupations: Musician; singer; actor; composer; record producer
- Years active: 1965–present
- Spouse: Leeyan Granger
- Children: 2

Teddie Joe Neeley (born September 20, 1943) is an American singer, actor, musician, composer, and record producer. He is known for portraying the title role in the 1973 film adaptation of Jesus Christ Superstar, for which he was nominated for two Golden Globe Awards and has reprised numerous times.

Neeley considers himself a baritone, and is known for his extremely wide vocal range and rock screams—notably the G above high C (G5) in "Gethsemane (I Only Want to Say)" from Jesus Christ Superstar.

== Early life and career ==
Neeley was born in Ranger, Texas. He signed his first record deal in 1965, at age 22, with Capitol Records. He and his group, The Teddy Neeley Five, recorded an album titled Teddy Neeley. They played the club circuit for years, and their name (on a marquee) appeared in the pilot episode of Dragnet 1967. In 1968, Neeley starred in the Los Angeles productions of Larry Norman's rock musicals Alison and Birthday for Shakespeare, with Norman and Richard Hatch. Then, in 1969, Neeley played the lead role of Claude in both the New York and Los Angeles productions of Hair.

== Jesus Christ Superstar ==
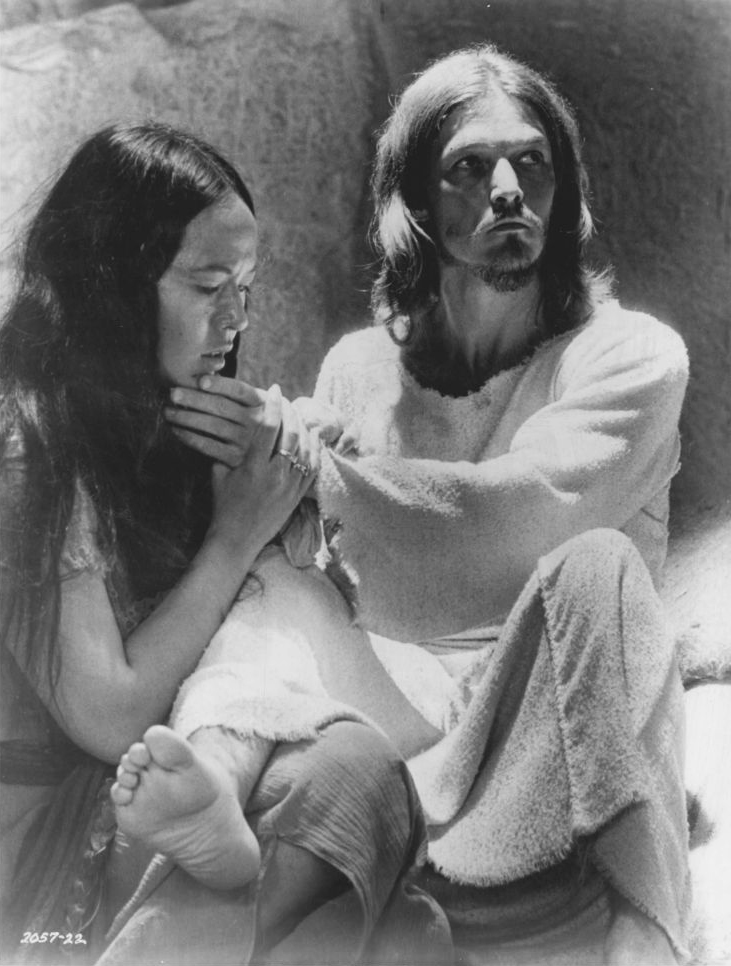
Yvonne Elliman with Ted Neeley in the feature film Jesus Christ Superstar (1973).

Neeley's work with Tom O'Horgan, the director of Hair, led to him being called when O'Horgan was hired to stage Jesus Christ Superstar for Broadway in 1971. Neeley originally auditioned for the role of Judas.

However, when Ben Vereen was chosen for the role, Neeley signed on as chorus and also became the understudy for Jesus Christ. This particular opportunity led to his taking on the title role in the Los Angeles stage version (which played at the Universal Amphitheatre in 1972), after receiving a standing ovation during a performance earlier in the tour. Castmate and close friend Carl Anderson was touring also as an understudy for Judas.

After performing the title role in the stage production of Tommy at the Aquarius Theatre in Hollywood in 1973, Neeley was led to reprise the title role in the film version of Jesus Christ Superstar, directed by Norman Jewison, alongside Anderson as Judas. In 1974, he received nominations for his performance in the film at the 31st Golden Globe Awards for "Best Actor in a Motion Picture—Musical or Comedy" and "New Star Of The Year—Actor".

== Discography ==
=== Solo albums ===
- 1967: Teddy Neeley
- 1973: 1974 A.D.
- 2018: Rock Opera

=== Collaborative albums ===
- 1973: Jesus Christ Superstar (The Original Motion Picture Sound Track Album)
- 1978: Ulysses: The Greek Suite (A-440 Feat. Ted Neeley & Yvonne Iversen)
- 1979: Keepin' 'Em Off the Streets—Performing the Music from the Motion Picture A Perfect Couple
