= I Don't Know How to Love Him =

1970 single by Yvonne Elliman

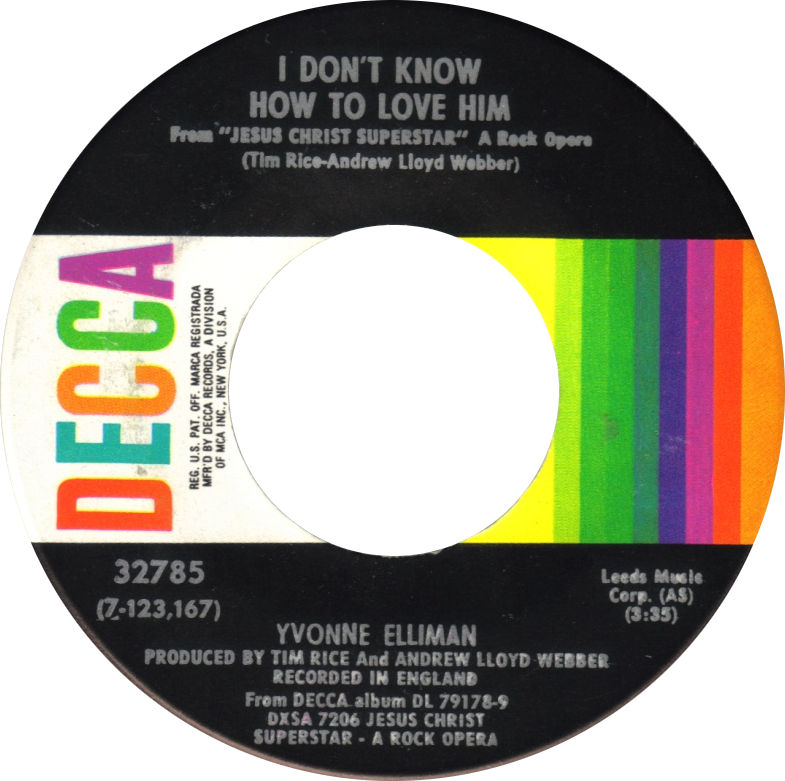
- A-side label of the US single

Single by Yvonne Elliman

from the album Jesus Christ Superstar
- B-side: "Overture: Jesus Christ Superstar"
- Released: 1971
- Recorded: 1970
- Studio: Olympic, London
- Genre: Folk
- Length: 3:36
- Label: Decca, MCA
- Composer: Andrew Lloyd Webber
- Lyricist: Tim Rice
- Producers: Lloyd Webber; Rice

Yvonne Elliman singles chronology
"I Don't Know How to Love Him" (1971)	"Everything's Alright" (1971)

Audio sample
- "I Don't Know How to Love Him": file; help

Lyrics video
- Andrew Lloyd Webber, Yvonne Elliman – "I Don't Know How to Love Him" on YouTube

"I Don't Know How to Love Him" is a song from the 1970 album and 1971 rock opera Jesus Christ Superstar written by Andrew Lloyd Webber (music) and Tim Rice (lyrics), a torch ballad sung by the character of Mary Magdalene. In the opera she is presented as bearing an unrequited love for the title character. The song has been much recorded, with "I Don't Know How to Love Him" being one of the rare songs – after the 1950s, when multi-version chartings were common – to have had two concurrent recordings reach the Top 40 of the Billboard Hot 100, specifically those by Helen Reddy and Yvonne Elliman.

== Composition and recording ==
"I Don't Know How to Love Him" had originally been published with different lyrics in autumn 1967, the original title being "Kansas Morning". The melody's main theme has come under some scrutiny for being non-original, being compared to a theme from Mendelssohn's Violin Concerto in E minor. In December 1969 and January 1970, when Andrew Lloyd Webber and Tim Rice completed Jesus Christ Superstar, Rice wrote new lyrics to the tune of "Kansas Morning" to provide the solo number for the character of Mary Magdalene (Rice and Webber's agent David Land would purchase the rights to "Kansas Morning" back from Southern Music for £50). Now entitled "I Don't Know How to Love Him", the song was recorded by Yvonne Elliman and completed between March and July 1970. When first presented with "I Don't Know How to Love Him", Elliman had been puzzled by the romantic nature of the lyrics, as she had been under the impression that the Mary she had been recruited to portray was Jesus's mother.

Recorded in one take at Olympic Studios in June 1970, "I Don't Know How to Love Him" has been universally acclaimed as the high point of the Jesus Christ Superstar soundtrack since the album's September 1970 release; in 2003 The Rough Guide to Cult Pop would assess Elliman's performance: "It's rare to hear a singer combine such power and purity of tone in one song, and none of the famous singers who have covered this ballad since have come close."

The choice for the first single release went, however, to the track "Superstar" by Murray Head. When a cover of "I Don't Know How to Love Him" by Helen Reddy began moving up the charts in spring 1971, the original track by Elliman was issued as a single to reach No. 28, although Reddy's version was more successful at No. 13. Both versions did moderately well on the Adult Contemporary chart, with Reddy's at No. 12 and Elliman's at No. 15. Despite the difference in chart success, Cash Box considered Elliman's version to be the stronger version of the song. In early 1972, Elliman's "I Don't Know How to Love Him" was issued in the UK on a double A-side single with Head's "Superstar"; with this release Elliman faced competition with a cover of "I Don't Know How to Love Him" by Petula Clark, but neither version entered the Top 40, both peaking at No. 47. Tim Rice produced several additional tracks for Elliman to complete her debut album.

Elliman performed "I Don't Know How to Love Him" when she played the Mary Magdalene role first in the Broadway production of Jesus Christ Superstar, which opened at the Mark Hellinger Theatre 12 October 1971, and then in the movie version, her respective renderings being featured on both the Broadway cast album and the soundtrack album for the film. Her version of "I Don't Know How to Love Him" from the movie soundtrack gave Elliman a hit in Italy (No. 21) in 1974. Elliman has also performed "I Don't Know How to Love Him" when revisiting her Mary Magdalene role, first at a Jesus Christ Superstar concert by the University of Texas at El Paso Dinner Theatre staged 14 April 2003, and then for a live-in-concert one-night only performance of Jesus Christ Superstar on 13 August 2006 at the Ricardo Montalban Theater in Los Angeles.

=== Chart history ===
Chart (1971)	Peak position
Australia (Go-Set)	72
Canada RPM Adult Contemporary	3
Canada RPM Top Singles	20
UK	47
US Billboard Hot 100	28
US Billboard Adult Contemporary	15
US Cash Box Top 100	30

Chart (1973)	Peak position
Italy	21

== Renditions ==
=== Theatrical ===
==== Melanie C ====
"I Don't Know How to Love Him"

Promotional single by Melanie C

from the album Stages
- Released: 22 July 2012
- Recorded: Spring 2012
- Genre: Pop
- Length: 5:23 (Album Version); 3:23 (Radio Edit)
- Label: Red Girl
- Songwriters: Andrew Lloyd Webber; Tim Rice
- Producer: Peter-John Vettese

English singer Melanie C performed "I Don't Know How to Love Him" in the role of Mary Magdalene during the Jesus Christ Superstar Live Arena Tour which had its initial UK run in September – October 2012 also playing the O2 Dublin 12 October 2012, followed first by an Australian tour in May – June 2013 and then an encore UK run in October 2012. Melanie C had debuted her performance of "I Don't Know How to Love Him" on 25 July 2012 when she sang the song to Andrew Lloyd Webber's piano accompaniment on the final of the reality-TV talent show Superstar broadcast by ITV. The Adelaide Now review of the ...Live Arena Tour's 4 June 2012 performance at the Adelaide Entertainment Centre stated: "Melanie C absolutely blitzes her big number 'I Don't Know How to Love Him' bringing a more raw rock edge to the bridge before hitting the final big notes right out of the arena."

Melanie C made a studio recording of "I Don't Know How to Love Him" for her 9 September 2012 album Stages, a show tune album produced by the singer's longtime collaborator Peter-John Vettese from which "I Don't Know How to Love Him" had been issued in digital download format as a preview to rank after its first week of release at #20 on the UK Independent Singles Chart.

===== Charts =====
Chart (2012)	Peak position
UK Indie Chart	20

===== Credits and personnel =====
Credits for the album version of "I Don't Know How to Love Him".

- Andrew Lloyd Webber – songwriter
- Tim Rice – songwriter
- Peter-John Vettese – producer
- Mark 'Tufty' Evans – engineer
- Tony Cousins – mastering
- Ian Ross – art designer
- Tim Bret-Day – photographer

===== Release history =====
Country	Date	Format
United Kingdom	22 July 2012	Digital download

==== Others ====
In 1992 Claire Moore sang "I Don't Know How to Love Him" on a 20th Anniversary re-recording of the JCS soundtrack.

Other singers with theatrical associations who have recorded "I Don't Know How to Love Him" include Marina Prior (Aspects of Andrew Lloyd Webber – 1992), and Julia McKenzie (The Musicals Album – 1992),

=== Non-theatrical versions ===
==== Helen Reddy ====
"I Don't Know How to Love Him"
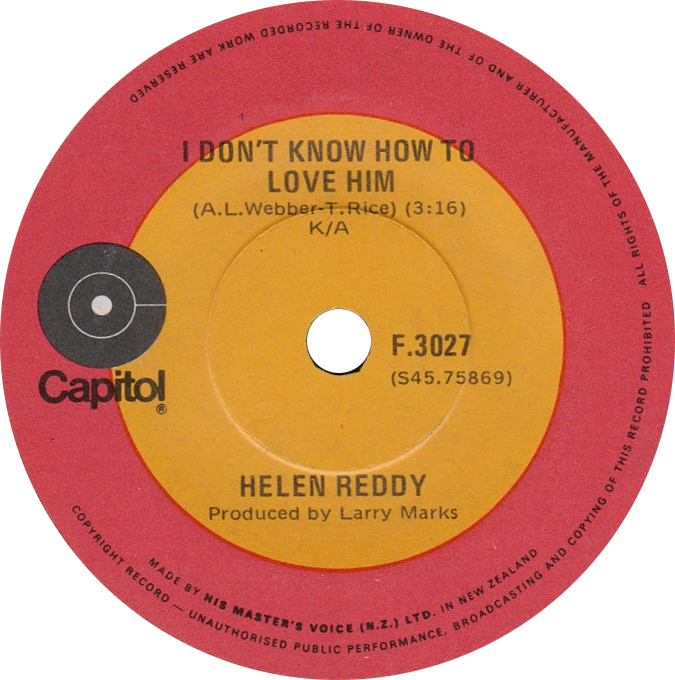
- Side A of New Zealand single

Single by Helen Reddy

from the album I Don't Know How to Love Him
- B-side: "I Believe in Music"
- Released: January 1971
- Recorded: 1970
- Genre: Traditional pop
- Length: 3:15
- Label: Capitol
- Songwriters: Andrew Lloyd Webber, Tim Rice
- Producer: Larry Marks

Helen Reddy singles chronology
"One Way Ticket" (1968)	"I Don't Know How to Love Him" (1971)	"Crazy Love" (1971)

Upon the release of the original Jesus Christ Superstar album Capitol Records executive Artie Mogull heard the potential for a smash hit in the track "I Don't Know How to Love Him" and had pitched the song to Linda Ronstadt, then on the Capitol roster; after Ronstadt advised Mogull: "she hated the song, [saying] it was terrible" Mogull invited the then-unknown Helen Reddy to record "I Don't Know How to Love Him" as part of a one-off single deal with Capitol. Reddy herself did not care for "I Don't Know How to Love Him" agreeing to cut the song to serve as B-side for the track she wished to record: the Mac Davis composition; "I Believe in Music" (later a hit for Gallery).

===== Background and recording =====
In her autobiography The Woman I Am, Helen Reddy states that Mogull invited her to record a single after seeing her perform on a Tonight Show episode (the guest host Flip Wilson had invited Reddy to appear; Wilson knew Reddy from the club circuit). Mogull himself attributed his interest in Reddy to the solicitations on her behalf by her then-husband and manager Jeff Wald who called Mogull three times a day for five months asking him to let Reddy cut a song. Larry Marks produced Reddy's recording of "I Don't Know How to Love Him" and "I Believe in Music" at A&M's recording studios. According to Reddy, her extreme anxiety – "I had waited years for this shot and I didn't think there would be another one" – manifested in her vocals making "I Believe in Music" ineffectual but "I Don't Know How to Love Him" convincingly plaintive, clinching the decision to make the latter the A-side of the single, released in January 1971. In a 1974 Billboard tribute to Helen Reddy, writer Cynthia Spector states "I Don't Know How to Love Him" became a hit due to the efforts of Jeff Wald "who stayed on the phone morning to night, cajoling, bullying, wheedling airplay from disk jockeys. Using $4,000 of his own money, his own telephone credit card and his American Express card to wine and dine anyone who would listen to his wife, he made the record happen."

===== Release =====
Reddy attributes the eventual success of her recording of "I Don't Know How to Love Him" to the positive listener response the track received at the first station where it was played, WDRC (AM) in Hartford, Conn. A number of the "local requests" for "I Don't Know How to Love Him" originated in Los Angeles, made by Reddy's visiting nephew—a teenage Australian actor with a penchant for different voices—and also a number of Reddy's friends, with Reddy admitting: "I may have made a call or two myself." In April 1971 WDRC program director Charles R. Parker would relate how Reddy and Wald had visited WDRC to thank the station for its initial support of Reddy's "I Don't Know How to Love Him," with Reddy and Wald expressing how they "were more than delighted and surprised to see [the track] break on Top 40 at WDRC."

===== Chart impact =====
Reddy's recording of "I Don't Know How to Love Him" entered the national charts in March 1971 – showing in the Top Ten in Dallas and Denver that month – but its momentum was so gradual as to not effect Top 40 entry until that May; by then MCA Records had issued the original Yvonne Elliman track as a single and from 15 May 1971 to 26 June 1971 both versions were in the Top 40 with Reddy's version maintaining the upper hand peaking at No. 13 while Elliman's version peaked at No. 28. "I Don't Know How to Love Him" became Reddy's first major hit single in her native Australia, peaking at No. 2 on the Go-Set Top 40 chart for two weeks in August 1971 with an eventual ranking as the No. 8 hit for the year 1971. On Australia's Kent Music Report, the song also reached No. 2, but stayed at that position for eight consecutive weeks. The track also afforded Reddy a hit in Europe with a March 1972 peak of No. 14 in Sweden—the Swedish production of Jesus Christ Superstar had begun a record-setting run in February 1972—and an April 1972 peak of No. 23 in the Netherlands.

The success of "I Don't Know How to Love Him" led to Reddy's being signed to a long-term contract by Capitol who released her I Don't Know How to Love Him album in August 1971. The track issued as a follow-up single: a version of Van Morrison's "Crazy Love" stalled short of the Top 40 at No. 51, while the album charted with a moderate No. 100 peak; Reddy's subsequent success, however, garnered her debut album sufficient interest for it be certified as a Gold record in 1974. Also of note, the I Don't Know How to Love Him album included an initial arrangement of Reddy's signature song, "I Am Woman" which via a 1972 re-recording with a new arrangement would prove to be the vehicle to consolidate Reddy's stardom, reaching No. 1 on the Billboard Hot 100 dated 9 December 1972.

===== Weekly charts =====
Chart (1971)	Peak position
Australia Go-Set	2
Australia Kent Music Report	2
Canada RPM Top Singles	10
Netherlands	23
Sweden	14
U.S. Billboard Hot 100	13
U.S. Billboard Easy Listening	12

===== Year-end charts =====
Chart (1971)	Rank
Australia Go-Set	8
Australia Kent Music Report	6
Canada	99
U.S. Billboard Hot 100	50

==== Other non-theatrical versions ====
The earliest single version of "I Don't Know How to Love Him" was by Karen Wyman, an artist on the roster of MCA/Decca Records, the label of release for the original Jesus Christ Superstar album: Wyman's single, produced by Ken Greengrass and Peter Matz, was released in November 1970 in the US and was also released in 1970 in the UK. Introduced on her May 1971 album release One Together, Wyman's "I Don't Know How to Love Him" had reached #101 in Record World's "The Singles Chart 101–150" during a December 1970 – January 1971 eight-week tenure.

A version of "I Don't Know How to Love Him" done in medley with "Everything's Alright", also from Jesus Christ Superstar, was recorded on the Happy Tiger label by a group credited as the Kimberlys; released in January 1971 the same week as the Helen Reddy version, the Kimberleys' track received enough regional attention to reach No. 99 on the Billboard Hot 100 that March.

Dutch vocalist Bojoura had a 1971 single release of "I Don't Know How to Love Him" with the song relegated to B-side status, the single's A-side being "Everything's Alright".

The appearance of Helen Reddy's version on the Billboard Hot 100 also drew the single release of the version of "I Don't Know How to Love Him" by Petula Clark which single – produced by Johnny Harris – would be Clark's last released on Warner Brothers.

In the British Isles "I Don't Know How to Love Him" first became a hit in the Republic of Ireland where Tina & Real McCoy took it to No. 1 in December 1971. In January 1972 the version by Petula Clark was released in the UK to chart at No. 47 marking Clark's final appearance on the UK Singles chart except for the 1988 remix of her 1964 hit "Downtown". Clark's "I Don't Know How to Love Him" was to be her final single release on Pye Records. Concurrent with Clark's version, the original Yvonne Elliman track was issued as a single on a double A-side with "Superstar" by Murray Head; this single peaked at UK No. 47. Tony Hatch, who had produced Petula Clark's hit singles of the 1960s, had produced a version of "I Don't Know How to Love Him" by his then-wife Jackie Trent, which was issued as a single 5 November 1971: Hatch would later produce a rendition of the song by Julie Budd for her 1972 self-titled album. A 1972 version by Sylvie McNeill on a UK 45, United Artists UA UP35415, was released (11 August) timed for the first UK stage musical of Jesus Christ Superstar; she had actually performed it on The Benny Hill Show (original air date: 23 February 1972).

Petula Clark also recorded "I Don't Know How to Love Him" in French as "La Chanson de Marie-Madeleine" which served as the title cut for a 1972 French language album which also featured Clark's version of "I Don't Know How to Love Him". "La Chanson de Marie-Madeleine" became a chart item (#66) for Clark in Quebec in March 1972 despite being bested in France by the Anne-Marie David version from the Paris cast recording which reached No. 29.

In 1972, Cilla Black recorded the song for Day by Day with Cilla – her seventh and final studio album to be produced by George Martin. Black revealed in her 2003 autobiography What's It All About how she had worked so hard to produce the song which she loved but as her record label EMI Records were having industrial action the album was delayed a year. The singer went on to explain "Disappointed though I was, there was at least a crumb of comfort for me when Tim Rice hailed my recording as 'the definitive version'." Also in 2003, Andrew Lloyd Webber wrote for the booklet of Black's compilation album The Best of 1963–78 "Her version of 'I Don't Know How to Love Him' in my opinion stands up alongside her other great songs...". Black's original vocal was remixed for her 2009 club remixes album Cilla All Mixed Up.

Shirley Bassey recorded "I Don't Know How to Love Him" for her 1972 album release And I Love You So with the track having a single release as the B-side of the title track. Johnny Harris, who'd produced Petula Clark's version of "I Don't Know How to Love Him", was the producer of Bassey's And I Love You So album (Noel Rogers was credited as executive producer) and on that album's "I Don't Know How to Love Him" track Harris acted as arranger/conductor.
