= Jesus Christ Superstar (1996 London Cast) =

Cast recording by 1996 Cast
- Released: 1996
- Recorded: 1996
- Genre: Rock
- Label: Decca Broadway

Jesus Christ Superstar (1996 London Cast) is a soundtrack album released in 1996. Jesus Christ Superstar is a rock opera created by Tim Rice and Andrew Lloyd Webber in 1970. This is the 1996 revival version supervised by Lloyd Webber himself.

This album features Steve Balsamo (as Jesus), Zubin Varla (as Judas) and Joanna Ampil (as Mary Magdalene). Rocker Alice Cooper was brought in to sing King Herod's Song, which differs from the actual 1996 cast.

== Singers ==
- Steve Balsamo - Jesus
- Zubin Varla - Judas
- Joanna Ampil - Mary Magdalene
- David Burt - Pilate
- Pete Gallagher - Caiaphas
- Martin Callaghan - Annas
- Glenn Carter - Simon
- Alice Cooper - King Herod
- Jonathan Hart - Peter

== See also ==
- Jesus Christ Superstar
