= Hugh Maynard =

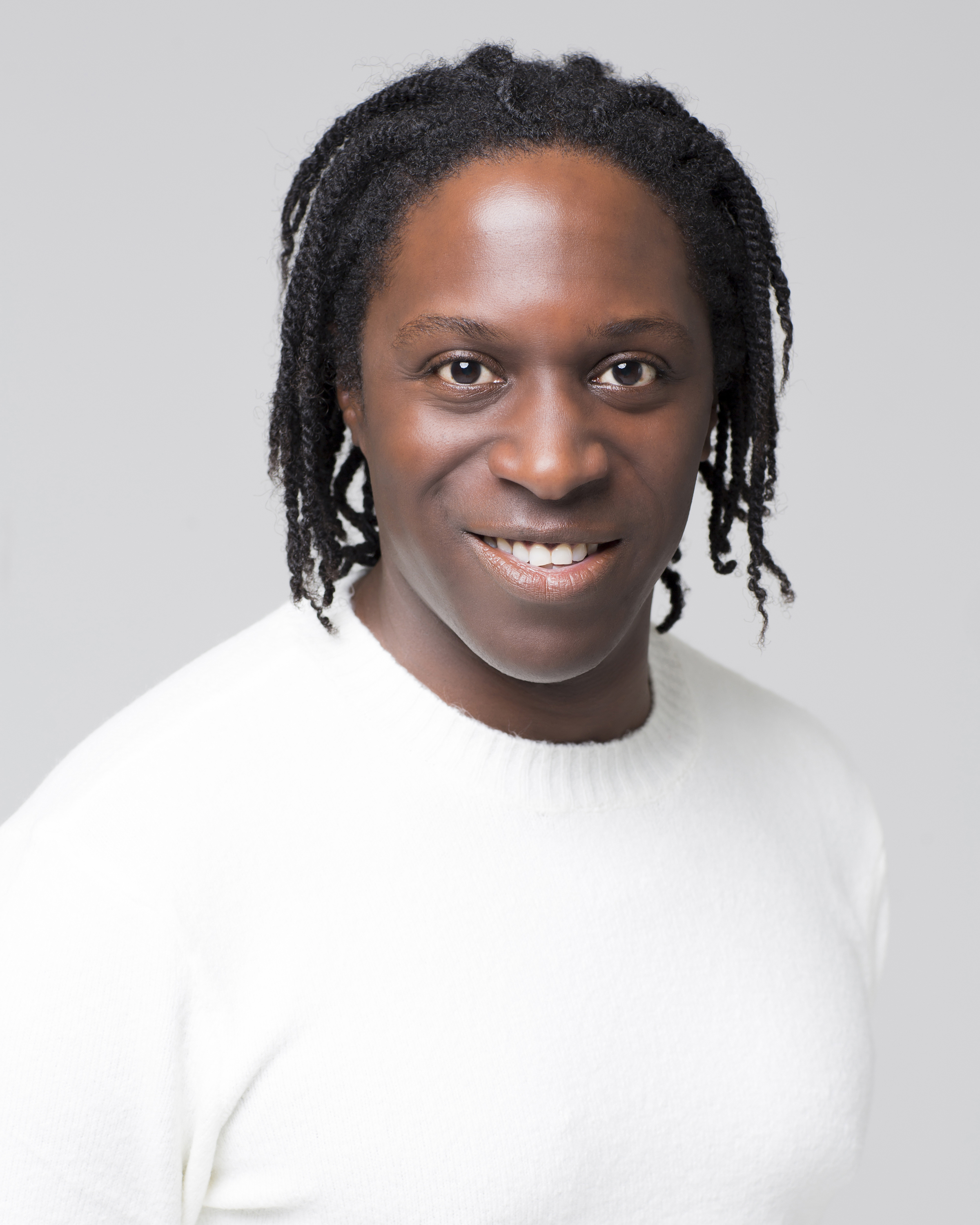
- Hugh Maynard in 2018
- Born: 27 March 1975 (age 50); Birmingham, England
- Occupations: Actor, singer
- Musical career
- Genres: Rock, Soul, Musical Theatre
- Website: hugh-maynard.com

Hugh Maynard (born 27 March 1975) is a British actor and singer of African-Caribbean descent. He is known for his roles in Miss Saigon and Sweeney Todd on the West End.

== Early life and education ==
Hugh Maynard was born in the UK and grew up in Torquay, Devon. His mother abandoned him, and then due to neglect by his father, he was taken into the care of Birmingham social services at just a few months old. He lived in various children's homes for a number of years. At the age of seven, he appeared on the Birmingham-made TV show Tiswas. At eight, he was permanently fostered and he moved with his new family to settle in Torbay, Devon.

Maynard participated in the Sea Cadets; he played trumpet for the Devon Youth Jazz Orchestra; he entered various talent competitions and was compere for a local show Devon's Got Talent. While studying and preparing for drama school he worked in fast food outlets and as a lifeguard, and modelled sportswear.

Hugh Maynard initially studied sports science at the University of Bath, but he then changed direction to drama and music. He attended the Academy of Live And Recorded Arts in London on a two year scholarship. He also attended the Arts Educational Schools in Chiswick, London on a scholarship.

== Career ==
=== Musical Theatre ===
Maynard made his West End debut by playing the principal role of Simon Zealotes in Jesus Christ Superstar, produced by Andrew Lloyd Webber's Really Useful Theatre Group. From 1999 to 2000, Maynard landed lead roles in The Lion King and Notre Dame de Paris theatre productions, playing Simba and Clopin respectively. In 2002, he went on to star in We Will Rock You The Jackson 5 and in Follies playing young Ben. In 2004, Hugh Maynard first played John in Laurence Connor's revival of Boublil and the first UK tour of Schönberg's classic musical melodrama Miss Saigon, In 2006, Maynard played Marvin Gaye in Dancing in the Streets. In 2009, he performed at the London Palladium, in Whoopi Goldberg's stage production of Sister Act. Ten years after his with performance in Miss Saigon, Maynard reprised his role of John in Cameron Mackintosh's new production of Miss Saigon at The Prince Edward Theatre in London. He was nominated as "Best Featured Actor in a New Production of a Musical" in Broadway World Awards 2014. and "Best Supporting Actor in a Musical" in 15th Annual WhatsOnStage Awards, for this performance. In 2016 Maynard performed in Travels with my Aunt at the Minerva Theatre in Chichester. The same year, he became the first Black performer to play Sweeney Todd in Sweeney Todd in the Mercury Theatre Colchester’s production, in partnership with Derby Theatre.

=== TV ===
In addition to his highly successful acting on stage, Hugh's TV credits include ITV Superstar 2012, Wycliffe, The Bill, Casualty and Royal Variety Performance.

=== Music ===
Maynard is a member of the rock group, Tenors of Rock (TOR). They have toured the UK, Europe and America and performed at the 2012 London Olympic Games. Their debut single, "Brothers in Arms", reached No.20 in the official UK rock chart. The group also took part in the 2013 series of the talent show, The X-Factor, reaching the judges home stage with Gary Barlow.

Maynard has performed live at various venues, including the 2007 British Red Cross Gala Ball, a 2013 halftime show at the Rogers Centre in Toronto, Canada, TOR Live at Palms Resort in Las Vegas, and the 2012 Olympic Games at BT London Live.

In March 2015, Hugh Maynard released his solo debut Album, Hugh Maynard – Something Inside so Strong. The album is a collection of rock, soul and musical theatre numbers, including Marvin Gaye's "Let's Get It On", John Farnham's "You're The Voice", Seal's "Kiss from a Rose" and "Bui Doi" from Miss Saigon.

== Philanthropy ==
Hugh Maynard has been a guest speaker at a number of conferences organized by Lincolnshire Children's Services, sharing his experiences of living in residential and foster care. He has also performed at events and conferences for the Lincolnshire Sensory Impaired Service.

Maynard has also supported the Lincoln-based project Action for Children and Saint Francis School, a specialist provision in Lincoln for disabled children and Plan UK's campaigns of "End Child Marriage". He also promoted participation in the arts through involvement in West End Week and has links to the Women's International League for Peace and Freedom.

== Personal life ==
When Maynard is not busy with music and theatre work, he participates in cooking, athletics and photography.

== Studio album ==
2015| Hugh Maynard – Something Inside So Strong Track Listing:

1. Something Inside So Strong
2. Let’s Get It On
3. Bring Him Home
4. You’re The Voice
5. Kiss from a Rose
6. I Who Have Nothing
7. When a Man Loves a Woman
8. Get Here
9. Creep
10. Back at One
11. Bui Doi
12. Love Is On the Way

== Filmography ==
=== Film ===
| Year | Title | Network | Role |
| 1997 | Frenchmans Creek | Carlton | Servant |
| 2015 | The Heat Is Back On, The Remaking of Miss Saigon | Universal | John |
| 2016 | Miss Saigon Live | Universal | John |

=== Television ===
| Year | Title | Network | Role |
| 1992 | Box Pops | BBC | Presenter |
| 1999 | Royal Variety Performance | Variety | Lion King |
| 2007 | Magic of the Musicals: Variety Children’s Charity London | | Himself |
| 2008 | Happy Show | Global TV | Himself |
| 2010 | Royal Variety Performance | Variety | Sister Act |
| 2012 | ITV Superstar | ITV | Himself |
| 2014 | Royal Variety Performance | Variety | Miss Saigon |

=== Stage ===
| Year | Title | Venue | Role |
| 1997 | Jesus Christ Superstar | Lyceum Theatre | Apostle James u/s Judas Iscariot |
| 1999 | The Lion King | Lyceum Theatre | Simba |
| 2000 | Notre Dame De Paris | Dominion Theatre | Clopin |
| 2001 | Jesus Christ Superstar | UK Tour | Simon Zealotes |
| 2002 | Follies | Royal Festival Hall | Young Ben |
| 2002 | We Will Rock You | | The Jackson 5 |
| 2004 | Miss Saigon | UK Tour | John Thomas |
| 2006 | Dancing in the Street | Aldwych Theatre/UK Tour | Marvin Gaye |
| 2009 | Sister Act | London Palladium Theatre | Ensemble/US Eddie & Cutis |
| 2014 | Miss Saigon | Prince Edward Theatre | John Thomas |
| 2016 | Travels with My Aunt | Chichester Minerva Theatre | Wordsworth |
| 2016 | Sweeney Todd: The Demon Barber of Fleet Street | Derby Theatre | Sweeney Todd |

=== Workshop ===
| Year | Title | Role |
| 2005 | Avenue Q | Nicky, Trekkie Monster & Gary Coleman |

== Awards ==
- 2014 – Broadway World UK/West End Awards – "Best Featured Actor in a New Production of a Musical" nomination – John in Miss Saigon
- 2015 – 15th Annual WhatsOnStage Awards – "Best Supporting Actor in a Musical" nomination – John in Miss Saigon
