= Miss Saigon =

1989 stage musical

- Original poster
- Music: Claude-Michel Schönberg
- Lyrics: Alain Boublil Richard Maltby Jr.
- Book: Alain Boublil Claude-Michel Schönberg
- Basis: Madama Butterfly by Giacomo Puccini
- Premiere: September 20, 1989: Theatre Royal, Drury Lane, London
- Productions: 1989 West End; 1991 Broadway; 2014 West End revival; 2017 Broadway revival

Miss Saigon is a sung-through stage musical by Claude-Michel Schönberg and Alain Boublil, with lyrics by Boublil and Richard Maltby Jr. It is based on Giacomo Puccini's 1904 opera Madama Butterfly, and similarly tells the tragic tale of a doomed romance involving an Asian woman abandoned by her American lover. The setting of the plot is relocated to 1970s Saigon during the Vietnam War, and Madama Butterfly's story of marriage between an American lieutenant and a geisha is replaced by a romance between a United States Marine and a seventeen-year-old South Vietnamese bargirl.

The musical premiered at the Theatre Royal, Drury Lane, London, on 20 September 1989, closing after 4,092 performances on 30 October 1999. It opened on Broadway at the Broadway Theatre on April 11, 1991, with a record advance of over $39 million, and was later staged in many other cities and embarked on tours. Opening day ticket-sales for the 2014 London revival of more than £4m were said to set a world record.

The musical was Schönberg and Boublil's second major success, following Les Misérables in 1985. As of January 2026, Miss Saigon remains Broadway's fifteenth longest-running show.

== Background ==
The musical was inspired by a photograph, which Schönberg found inadvertently in a magazine. It showed a Vietnamese mother leaving her child at a departure gate at Tan Son Nhut Air Base for the child to board an airplane headed for the United States where the child's father, an ex-G.I., would be in a position to provide a much better life for the child. Schönberg considered this mother's actions for her child to be "The Ultimate Sacrifice," an idea central to the plot of Miss Saigon.

Highlights of the show include the evacuation of the last Americans in Saigon from the Embassy roof by helicopter while a crowd of abandoned Vietnamese people screams in despair, the victory parade of the new communist regime, and the frenzied night club scene at the time of defeat.

== Principal characters ==
Character	Voice Type	Description
Kim	Mezzo-soprano E_{3}–E_{5}	A seventeen-year-old Vietnamese girl, recently orphaned and forced to work at "Dreamland." She corresponds to Butterfly in the original opera.
Chris Scott	Baritenor A_{2}–A_{4} (falsetto B_{4})	An American Marine sergeant about to leave Saigon to return to America. He corresponds to Pinkerton.
Engineer	Baritone A_{2}–A♭_{4}	The sleazy hustler and owner of "Dreamland." He is half-Vietnamese and half-French. He corresponds to Goro.
Ellen	Mezzo-soprano F♯_{3}–E_{5}	Chris's American wife. She corresponds to Kate.
John Thomas	Tenor A♭_{2}–B♭_{4}	Chris's friend, also a Marine. He corresponds to Sharpless.
Thuy	Tenor C_{3}–B♭_{4}	Kim's cousin and betrothed, to whom Kim's parents promised her when the two were thirteen. Has since become an officer in the Communist Vietnamese government. He is a composite character, corresponding in part to both The Bonze and Prince Yamadori.
Gigi Van Tranh	Mezzo-soprano G_{3}–E♭_{5}	A hardened Saigon stripper; initially voted as "Miss Saigon".
Tam	Silent	Kim and Chris's three-year-old son. He corresponds to Dolore, or "Sorrow".

== Synopsis ==
=== Act 1 ===
In April 1975 at "Dreamland", a Saigon bar and brothel, shortly before the end of the Vietnam War, it is Kim's first day as a bargirl. The seventeen-year-old peasant girl is hauled in by the Engineer, a French-Vietnamese hustler who owns the joint. Backstage, the girls ready themselves for the night's show, jeering at Kim's inexperience ("Overture / Backstage Dreamland"). The U.S. Marines, aware that they will soon be leaving Vietnam, party with the Vietnamese sex workers ("The Heat Is on in Saigon"). Chris Scott, a sergeant disenchanted by the club scene, is encouraged by his friend John Thomas to go with a girl.

The girls compete for the title of "Miss Saigon", and the winner is raffled to a Marine. Kim's guilelessness strikes Chris. Gigi Van Tranh wins the crown for the evening and begs the marine who won the raffle to take her back to America, annoying him. The showgirls reflect on their dreams of a better life ("The Movie in My Mind"). John buys a room for Chris and the virgin Kim ("The Transaction"). Kim is reluctant and shy, but dances with Chris, who tries to pay her to leave the nightclub. When the Engineer interferes, thinking that Chris does not like Kim, Chris allows himself to be led to her room ("The Dance").

Chris, watching Kim sleep, asks God why he met her just as he was about to leave Vietnam ("Why, God, Why?"). When Kim wakes up, Chris tries to give her money, but she refuses, saying that it is her first time sleeping with a man ("This Money's Yours"). Touched to learn that Kim is an orphan, Chris offers to take her to America with him, and the two fall in love ("Sun and Moon"). Chris tells John that he is taking leave to spend time with Kim. John warns him that the Viet Cong will soon take Saigon, but then reluctantly agrees to cover for Chris ("The Telephone Song"). Chris meets with the Engineer to trade for Kim, but the Engineer tries to include an American visa in the deal. Threatening the Engineer at gunpoint, Chris forces him to honor the original arrangement for Kim ("The Deal").

The bargirls hold a "wedding ceremony" for Chris and Kim ("Dju Vui Vai"), with Gigi toasting Kim as the "real" Miss Saigon. Thuy, Kim's cousin, to whom she was betrothed at thirteen, arrives to take her home. He has since become an officer in the North Vietnamese Army and is disgusted to find her with a white man ("Thuy's Arrival"). The two men confront each other, drawing their firearms. Kim tells Thuy that their arranged marriage is now nullified because her parents are dead, and she no longer harbors any feelings for him because of his betrayal. Thuy curses them all and storms out ("What's This I Find?"). Chris promises to take Kim with him when he leaves Vietnam. Chris and Kim dance to the same song as on their first night ("Last Night of The World").

Three years later, in 1978, a street parade is taking place in Saigon (since renamed Ho Chi Minh City) to celebrate the third anniversary of the reunification of Vietnam and the defeat of the Americans ("The Morning of The Dragon"). Thuy, now a commissar in the new Communist government, has ordered his soldiers to look for the still-corrupt Engineer. For the Communist Party, he goes by the name "Tran Van Dinh" and has spent the past three years working in the rice fields as part of a re-education program. Thuy orders the Engineer to find Kim and bring her to him. Although the intervening period is not shown, it is apparent that Kim and Chris have become separated in the three year time jump. Kim has been hiding in an impoverished area, still in love with Chris and steadfastly believing that Chris will return to Vietnam and rescue her. Meanwhile, Chris is in bed with his new American wife, Ellen, when he wakes from a dream shouting Kim's name. Ellen and Kim both swear their devotion to Chris from opposite ends of the world ("I Still Believe").

The Engineer takes Thuy to where Kim has been hiding. Kim refuses Thuy's renewed offer of marriage, unaware that his men are waiting outside the door. Furious, Thuy calls them in and they begin tying up Kim and the Engineer, threatening to put them into a re-education camp ("Coo-Coo Princess"), before Thuy orders them out and allows the Engineer to leave. Again, Kim refuses to go with Thuy and shocks him by introducing Thuy to Tam, her three-year-old son from Chris. Thuy calls Kim a traitor and Tam an enemy, and tries to kill Tam with a knife, but Kim is forced to shoot Thuy to protect Tam ("You Will Not Touch Him"). Thuy dies as the street parade continues nearby ("This Is the Hour"), with Kim showing horror and heartbreak at her action, before fleeing with Tam.

The Engineer laments being born Vietnamese and wishes to go to the US ("If You Want to Die in Bed"). Kim tells the Engineer what she has done, and he learns that Tam's father is American ("Let Me See His Western Nose") – thinking the boy is his chance to emigrate to the United States. He tells Kim that now he is the boy's uncle, and he will lead them to Bangkok. As Kim swears to Tam that she would do anything to give him a better life, the three set out on a ship with other refugees ("I'd Give My Life for You").

=== Act 2 ===
In Atlanta, Georgia, John now works for an aid organization whose mission is to connect Bui-Doi (from Vietnamese trẻ bụi đời "street children," meaning children conceived during the war) with their American fathers ("Bui Doi"). John tells Chris that Kim is still alive, which Chris is relieved to hear after years of having nightmares of her dying. He also tells Chris about Tam and urges Chris to go to Bangkok with Ellen, and Chris then finally tells Ellen about Kim and Tam ("The Revelation"). In Bangkok, the Engineer is hawking a sleazy club where Kim works as a dancer ("What A Waste"). Chris, Ellen, and John arrive in search of Kim. John finds Kim dancing at the club and tells her that Chris is also in Bangkok. He then tries to tell her that Chris is remarried, but Kim interrupts. She is thrilled about the news and tells Tam that his father has arrived, believing that they are to go to America with Chris. Seeing Kim happy, John cannot bring himself to break the news to her but promises to bring Chris to her ("Please"). (Note: Replaced with "Too Much for One Heart" with the same melody in 2014 London revival)

The Engineer tells Kim to find Chris herself because he doubts that Chris will come ("Chris Is Here"). Kim is haunted by the ghost of Thuy, who taunts Kim, claiming that Chris will betray her as he did the night Saigon fell. Kim suffers a horrible flashback to that night ("Kim's Nightmare").

In the nightmare and flashback to 1975, Kim remembers the Viet Cong approaching Saigon. As the city becomes increasingly chaotic, Chris is called to the embassy and leaves his gun with Kim, telling her to pack. When Chris enters the embassy, the gates close, as orders arrive from Washington for an immediate evacuation of the remaining Americans. The Ambassador orders that no more Vietnamese be allowed into the Embassy. Kim reaches the gates of the Embassy, one in a crowd of terrified Vietnamese trying to enter. Chris calls to Kim and is about to go into the crowd to look for her. John is eventually forced to punch Chris in the face to stop him from leaving. Chris is put into the last helicopter leaving Saigon as Kim watches from outside, still pledging her love to him ("The Fall of Saigon").

Back in 1978 Bangkok, Kim joyfully dresses in her wedding clothes ("Sun and Moon [Reprise]") and leaves the Engineer to watch Tam while she is gone. She goes to Chris's hotel room, where she finds Ellen. Ellen reveals that she is Chris's wife. While Kim is heartbroken and initially in denial about the truth, she soon confirms to Ellen that Tam is Chris's son, and says that she does not want her son to continue living on the streets, pleading that they take Tam with them back to America, but Ellen refuses, saying that Tam needs his real mother, and Ellen wants her own children with Chris. Kim angrily demands that Chris tell her these things in person, and runs out of the room ("Room 317"). Ellen feels bad for Kim, but is determined to keep Chris ("Now That I've Seen Her/Maybe"). (Note: Originally "Who Says I'm Hurt" and "Her or Me", replaced with "Maybe", with new music and lyrics for the 2011 Dutch revival)

Chris and John return, having failed to find Kim. Ellen tells them both that Kim arrived and that she had to tell Kim everything. Chris and John blame themselves, realizing that they were gone too long. Ellen also tells them that Kim wants to see Chris at her place and that she tried to give away her son to them. John realizes that Kim wants Tam to be "an American boy." Ellen then issues an ultimatum to Chris: Kim or her. Chris reassures Ellen, and they pledge their love for each other. Chris and Ellen agree to leave Tam and Kim in Bangkok but offer them monetary support from America, while John decries their decision as selfish ("The Confrontation"). Back at the club, Kim tells the Engineer that they are still going to America ("Paper Dragons"). The Engineer imagines the extravagant new life that he will lead in America ("The American Dream"). Chris, John, and Ellen find the Engineer and he takes them to see Kim and Tam.

In her room, Kim tells Tam that he should be happy because he now has a father. She tells him that she cannot go with him but will be watching over him ("This Is the Hour [Reprise]"). (Note: Referred to as "Little God of My Heart" on the 2014 London revival recording, though those words are not contained in the lyrics) Chris, Ellen, John, and the Engineer arrive just outside her room. The Engineer comes in to take Tam outside to introduce him to his father. While this is happening, Kim steps behind a curtain and shoots herself. As she falls to the floor, Chris rushes into the room at the sound of the gunshot and finds Kim mortally wounded. He picks up Kim and asks what she has done. Replying that the gods guided him to his son, Kim asks Chris to hold her once more and they share one last kiss. Kim then repeats something that he said to her on the first night they met: "How in one night have we come so far?", and dies in Chris's arms as everyone watches ("Finale").

== Musical numbers ==
Act I

- "Overture" / "Backstage Dreamland" – Gigi, Kim, The Engineer and Bar Girls
- "The Heat is On in Saigon" – Soldiers, Bar Girls, The Engineer, Kim, John, Chris and Gigi
- "The Movie in My Mind" – Gigi, Kim and Bar Girls
- "The Transaction" – The Engineer, John, Soldiers, Chris, and Kim
- "The Dance" – Kim, Chris and The Engineer
- "Why, God, Why?" – Chris
- "This Money's Yours" – Chris and Kim
- "Sun and Moon" – Chris and Kim
- "The Telephone Song" / "Asking For Leave" – Chris and John
- "The Deal" – The Engineer and Chris
- "The Wedding Ceremony" – Gigi, Kim, Bar Girls and Chris
- "Thuy's Arrival" / "Thuy's Intervention" – Thuy, Chris, and Kim
- "Last Night of the World" – Chris and Kim
- "The Morning of the Dragon" – Soldiers, The Engineer, Two Guards and Thuy
- "I Still Believe" – Kim and Ellen
- "Back in Town" / "Coo-Coo Princess" – The Engineer, Kim, Thuy and Soldiers
- "Thuy's Death" / "You Will Not Touch Him" – Thuy and Kim
- "This is the Hour" – Chorus
- "If You Want to Die in Bed" – The Engineer
- "Let Me See His Western Nose" / "Kim & Engineer"– Kim and The Engineer
- "I'd Give My Life for You" – Kim
- "Exodus" – Chorus

Act II

- "Entr'acte"
- "Bui Doi" – John and Chorus
- "The Revelation" – Chris and John
- "What a Waste" – The Engineer, Hustlers, Tourists, John and Kim
- "Please" (Original Production) / "Too Much For One Heart" – John and Kim (2014 London / 2017 Broadway productions)
- "Chris is Here" – The Engineer, Kim, Club Owner and John
- "Kim's Nightmare (The Fall of Saigon)" – Thuy
- "Fall of Saigon" – Soldiers, Chris, Kim, John and Citizens
- "Sun and Moon" (Reprise) – Kim
- "Room 317" – Kim and Ellen
- "Now That I've Seen Her" (Original production "Who Says I'm Hurt" "Her or Me") / "Maybe" – Ellen (2011 Holland / 2012-2026 Japan / 2014 London / 2017 Broadway productions)
- "The Confrontation" – Chris, Ellen, John and Kim
- "Paper Dragons" – The Engineer and Kim
- "The American Dream" – The Engineer
- "This is the Hour" (Reprise) – Kim
- "Finale" – Chris and Kim

== Production history ==
=== West End (1989–1999) ===
Miss Saigon premiered in the West End at the Theatre Royal, Drury Lane on 20 September 1989 and closed after 4,264 performances on 30 October 1999. The director was Nicholas Hytner with musical staging by Bob Avian and scenic design by John Napier. In December 1994, the London production became the Theatre Royal's (Drury Lane) longest running musical, eclipsing the record set by My Fair Lady.

Lea Salonga played the part of Kim, winning the Laurence Olivier Award and Tony Award. The Engineer was portrayed by Jonathan Pryce, who also won the Laurence Olivier Award and Tony Award for the role. The part of Chris was originally played by Simon Bowman.

=== Broadway (1991–2001) ===
The musical débuted on Broadway at the Broadway Theatre on 11 April 1991 and closed on 28 January 2001 after 4,092 performances. Directed again by Nicholas Hytner with musical staging by Bob Avian, scenic design was by John Napier, costume design was by Andreane Neofitou and Suzy Benzinger and lighting design was by David Hersey.

=== West End revival (2014–2016) ===
Preview performances for the anticipated West End revival in the show's 25th year began in early May 2014 at the Prince Edward Theatre. It was produced by Cameron Mackintosh and directed by Laurence Connor. The official opening night was 21 May.

On 22 September 2014, a special 25th anniversary gala performance was held. After a full performance of the current show, Lea Salonga, Simon Bowman, Jonathan Pryce and many of the original 1989 cast joined with the current cast for a special finale. The finale started with Lea Salonga leading the ensemble with "This Is the Hour", Salonga and Rachelle Ann Go performed "The Movie in My Mind". Salonga, Simon Bowman, Alistair Brammer and Eva Noblezada performed "Last Night of the World" before Jonathan Pryce took to the stage for "The American Dream" and was later joined by Jon Jon Briones. The West End production closed on 27 February 2016 after 760 performances.

=== Broadway revival (2017–2018) ===
It was announced on November 19, 2015, that the West End production of the show would transfer to Broadway in March 2017 for a limited engagement through January 15, 2018. The production starred Eva Noblezada as Kim, Jon Jon Briones as The Engineer, Alistair Brammer as Chris, and Rachelle Ann Go as Gigi, all reprising their roles from the 2014 West End revival. Other cast members included Katie Rose Clarke as Ellen, Nicholas Christopher as John, and Devin Ilaw as Thuy. The revival played at the Broadway Theatre, the same venue the show played at for its Broadway debut. Preview performances began on March 1, 2017, with an official opening on March 23. The final performance was on January 14, 2018, after 24 previews and 340 performances.

=== Other productions ===
Miss Saigon has been staged in at least 25 countries and translated into at least twelve languages. In Tokyo, Stuttgart and The Hague, new theatres were designed specifically to house the show.

A production in Toronto at the Princess of Wales Theatre opened on May 8, 1993, starring Ma-Anne Dionisio as Kim, Kevin Gray as the Engineer, H.E. Greer as Chris, Rufus Bonds Jr. as John and Charles Azulay as Thuy. It closed on April 30, 1995. Replacements in the cast included Norm Lewis as John.

The musical opened in Australia at the Capitol Theatre Sydney on 29 July 1995, starring Joanna Ampil as Kim, Peter Cousens as Chris, Cocoy Laurel as The Engineer, Milton Craig Nealy as John, Darren Yap as Thuy, and Silvie Paladino as Ellen.

In Bømlo, Norway, it played in the outdoor amphitheatre from 5 August to 16 August 2009. A Bell helicopter was used. Arlington, Virginia's Signature Theatre 2013 production included the new song "Maybe" (which replaced the prior song "Now That I've Seen Her"), which was integrated into the West End's 2014 revival.

In 2023, a revival was staged at the Crucible Theatre in Sheffield, England. The production starred Joanna Ampil and Jessica Lee as the Engineer and Kim respectively. The production was nominated for three What's On Stage awards.

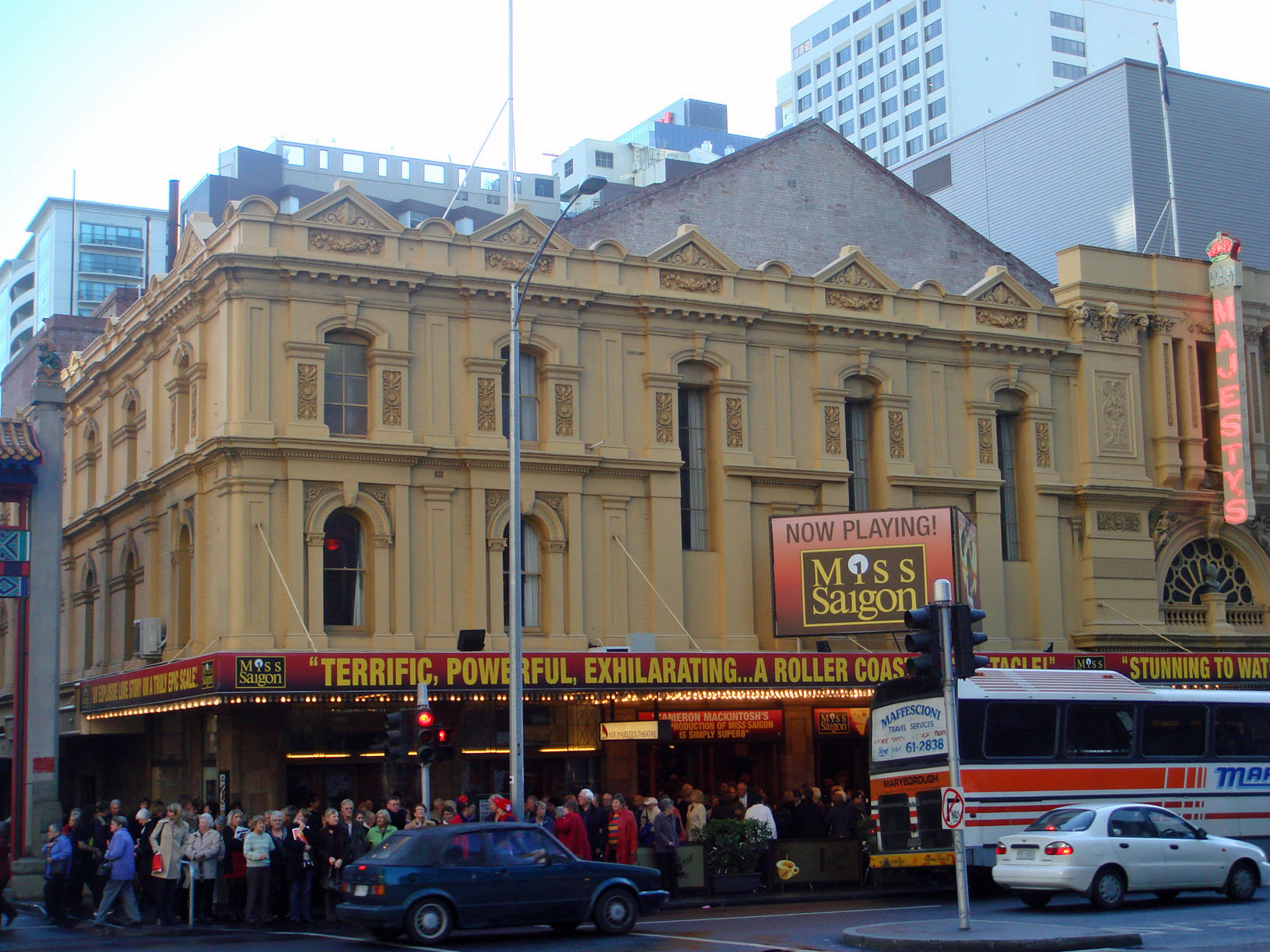
The new production of Miss Saigon at Her Majesty's Theatre in Melbourne

=== Touring productions ===
The first US tour started in Chicago, Illinois in October 1992 and was then expected to travel to those cities that could accommodate the large production. The tour also played venues such as the Wang Center in Boston from 14 July to 12 September 1993, the Broward Center for the Performing Arts, Florida in spring 1994, and the Kennedy Center, Washington, DC in June 1994. Cameron Mackintosh said, "Corners haven't been cut. They've been added. There are only a dozen theaters in America where we can do this."

A second national US tour launched in Seattle in early 1995 and closed in August 2000 in Buffalo, New York, after playing engagements in most major US and Canadian markets, including Honolulu, San Francisco, Toronto, and return engagements in Boston (twice), Chicago and West Palm Beach. The tour originally starred Deedee Magno Hall as Kim (replaced by Kristine Remigio, Kym Hoy and Mika Nishida), Thom Sesma as The Engineer (replaced by Joseph Anthony Foronda), and Matt Bogart as Chris (replaced by Will Chase, Steven Pasquale, Greg Stone and Will Swenson).

After the London production closed in 1999 and also following the closure of the Broadway production in 2001, the show in its original London staging embarked on a long tour of the six largest venues in Britain and Ireland, stopping off in each city for several months. The tour starring Joanna Ampil, Niklas Andersson and Leo Valdez opened at the Palace Theatre, Manchester and also played in the Birmingham Hippodrome, the Mayflower Theatre in Southampton, the Edinburgh Playhouse, the Bristol Hippodrome and The Point Theatre in Dublin. This successful tour drew to a close in 2003 and a brand new production was developed by original producer Cameron Mackintosh on a smaller scale so that the show could be accommodated in smaller theatres. This tour started in July 2004 and ended in June 2006.

A non-Equity North American tour began in summer 2002 to spring 2005, playing such venues as the New Jersey Performing Arts Center, Newark, New Jersey in November 2003, Raleigh, North Carolina in February 2005, and Gainesville, Florida in November 2003.

Following the 2014-16 London revival, a new UK and Ireland tour opened at the Curve in Leicester in July 2017 before touring to the Birmingham Hippodrome, the Bord Gáis Energy Theatre in Dublin, the Wales Millennium Centre in Cardiff, the Edinburgh Festival Theatre, the Mayflower Theatre in Southampton and the Palace Theatre in Manchester.

Another US tour began at Providence Performing Arts Center in September 2018. The tour closed early on March 15, 2020, in Fort Myers, Florida due to the COVID-19 pandemic.

The Cameron Mackintosh's new revival opened in Singapore in August 2024 and ran till 29 September 2024 at the Sands Theatre, Marina Bay Sands.

A new UK tour produced by Michael Harrison Entertainment in association with Cameron Mackintosh will open at the Theatre Royal in Newcastle in October 2025 before touring to Edinburgh, Manchester Birmingham, Leeds, Oxford, and more. Julianne Pundan is set to make her professional debut as Kim, while Seann Miley Moore is set to reprise the role of the Engineer which he previously played on the international tour. Following the tour, the production is set to play at the Prince Edward Theatre in the West End from May 13, 2027 to January 8, 2028.

== Casts ==
Character	Original West End	Original Broadway	Original U.S. Tour	Original U.K. Tour	2nd U.K Tour	West End Revival	Broadway Revival	International Tour	4th U.K Tour
Character	1989	1991	1992	2001	2006	2014	2017	2023	2025
Kim	Lea Salonga	Lea Salonga	Jennie Kwan	Joanna Ampil	Miriam Valmores	Eva Noblezada	Eva Noblezada	Abigail Adriano	Julianne Pundan
Chris Scott	Simon Bowman	Willy Falk	Jarrod Emick	Niklas Andersson	Ramin Karimloo	Alistair Brammer	Alistair Brammer	Nigel Huckle	Jack Kane
The Engineer	Jonathan Pryce	Jonathan Pryce	Raul Aranas	Leo Valdez	Jon Jon Briones	Jon Jon Briones	Jon Jon Briones	Seann Miley Moore	Seann Miley Moore
John Thomas	Peter Polycarpou	Hinton Battle	Keith Byron Kirk	Kingsley Leggs	John Partridge	Hugh Maynard	Nicholas Christopher	Lewis Francis	Dom Hartley-Harris
Ellen	Claire Moore	Liz Callaway	Christiane Noll	Nicky Adams	Lara Pulver	Tamsin Carroll	Katie Rose Clarke	Sarah Morrison	Emily Langham
Thuy	Keith Burns	Barry Bernal	Allen Hong	Robert Vicencio	Christian Rey Marbella	Kwang-Ho Hong	Devin Ilaw	Laurence Mossman	Mikko Juan
Gigi Van Tranh	Isay Alvarez	Marina Chapa	Moon Hi Hanson	Emma Jay Thomas	Christine Sambeli-Maquez	Rachelle Ann Go	Rachelle Ann Go	Kiara Dario	Ace

=== Notable replacements ===
==== West End (1989–1999) ====
- Kim: Joanna Ampil, Ma-Anne Dionisio, Naoko Mori, Jamie Rivera, Monique Wilson, Carla Guevara Laforteza
- Chris: John Barrowman, Graham Bickley, David Campbell, Peter Jöback, Jérôme Pradon, Glyn Kerslake
- The Engineer: Hilton McRae, Jon Jon Briones
- Ellen: Gunilla Backman, Ruthie Henshall
- Gigi: Lorraine Vélez

==== Broadway (1991–2001) ====
- Kim: Rona Figueroa, Joan Almedilla, Deedee Magno Hall, Jennie Kwan, Jennifer Paz, Annette Calud (a/t)
- Chris: Jarrod Emick, Eric Kunze, Peter Lockyer, Will Chase, Tyley Ross
- The Engineer: Raul Aranas, Wang Luoyong, Alan Muraoka
- John: Keith Byron Kirk, Norm Lewis, Matthew Dickens, Billy Porter, Curtiss Cook (u/s)
- Ellen: Tami Tappan, Anastasia Barzee, Jacquelyn Piro Donovan, Ruthie Henshall, Christiane Noll, Andrea Rivette (u/s)
- Thuy: Jason Ma, Yancey Arias, Michael K. Lee, Welly Yang

==== U.S. Tour (1992–2000) ====
- Kim: Deedee Magno Hall, Jennifer Paz
- The Engineer: Kevin Gray
- Chris: Will Chase, Eric Kunze, Peter Lockyer, Steven Pasquale, Greg Stone, Will Swenson
- John: Norm Lewis
- Ellen: Anastasia Barzee, Jacquelyn Piro Donovan, Andrea Rivette

==== UK Tours (2001–2006) ====
- Chris: Luke Evans
- Ellen: Kerry Ellis

==== West End revival (2014–2016) ====
- Ellen: Siobhan Dillon
- Gigi: Natalie Mendoza

== Controversies ==
Hubert van Es, a Dutch photojournalist who took the most famous image of the fall of Saigon in 1975 (a group of people scaling a ladder to a CIA helicopter on a rooftop), considered legal action when his photograph was used in Miss Saigon.

=== Casting ===
Miss Saigon has received criticism for its whitewashing as well as racist or sexist overtones, including protests regarding its portrayal of Asians and women in general. Originally, Pryce and Burns, white actors playing Eurasian/Asian characters, wore eye prostheses and bronzing cream to make themselves look more Asian, which outraged some who drew comparisons to a "minstrel show". Though there had been a widespread, well-publicised international search among Asian actresses to play Kim, there had been no equivalent search for Asian actors to play the major Asian male roles, specifically, those of the Engineer and Thuy. The American scholar Angelica Pao noted that in the West End, Mackintosh went out of his way to cast Asian actresses to play the Vietnamese women, arguing that this was necessary to provide authenticity, but he appears to have been content to cast white actors as Vietnamese men. The American scholar Yutian Wong noted, however, that when Miss Saigon premiered on the West End in 1989, reviews in British newspapers such as the Daily Mail, The Times, and the Evening Standard were uniformly positive as British theatre critics did not find anything objectionable about these characterisations. The controversy about Miss Saigon only began in 1990 with the prospect of it appearing on Broadway, which Wong argued was because the United States has a much larger East Asian population than does the United Kingdom.

When the production transferred from London to New York City, the Actors' Equity Association (AEA) refused to allow Pryce to portray the role of the Engineer, a Eurasian pimp, in the United States. The playwright David Henry Hwang and the actor B.D Wong wrote public letters of protest against Pryce's casting. Both Hwang and Wong had seen Miss Saigon on the West End of London and felt Pryce's performance in yellowface was demeaning to Asian people. Alan Eisenberg, executive secretary of AEA stated: "The casting of a Caucasian actor made up to appear Asian is an affront to the Asian community. The casting choice is especially disturbing when the casting of an Asian actor in the role would be an important and significant opportunity to break the usual pattern of casting Asians in minor roles." AEA's ruling on 7 August 1990 led to criticism from many, including the British Actors' Equity Association, citing violations of the principles of artistic integrity and freedom. Others argued that since the Engineer's character was Eurasian (French-Vietnamese), Pryce was being discriminated against on the basis that he was white. Also, Pryce was considered by many in Europe to have "star status", a clause that allows a well-known foreign actor to recreate a role on Broadway without an American casting call. Producer Cameron Mackintosh threatened to cancel the show, despite massive advance ticket sales. After pressure from Mackintosh, the general public, and many of its own members, AEA reversed its decision. Pryce starred when the show opened on Broadway.

During the production transfer from West End to Broadway, a lesser controversy erupted over Salonga's citizenship, as she was Filipina, and AEA wanted to give priority to its own members, initially preventing her from reprising her role. However, Mackintosh was unable to find a satisfactory replacement for Salonga despite the extensive auditions that he conducted in several American and Canadian cities. An arbitrator reversed the AEA ruling a month later to allow Salonga to star.

Later productions of Miss Saigon have been subject to boycotts from Asian actors.

=== Orientalism, racism, and misogyny ===
Internationally, community members objected to productions of the show over the years, arguing the show is racist and misogynist. The 2010 Fulbright Hayes Scholar D Hideo Maruyama states: "it's time to see the real Vietnam, not the Miss Saigon version. Whether or not America is ready to see the real one is up to question." American artist and activist Mai Neng Moua stated: "I protested Miss Saigon back in 1994 when the Ordway first brought it to town. I was a college student at St. Olaf and had never protested anything before. I didn't know what to say or do. I was scared people would yell or throw things at me. Then I met Esther Suzuki, a Japanese American woman whose family survived the racist U.S. policy of internment camps. Esther was about my size – which is small – but she was fearless. Esther protested Miss Saigon because, she better than anyone, understood Dr. King's "No one is free until we all are free." I stood with Esther, protesting Miss Saigon, and drew strength from her. We protested Miss Saigon because it was racist, sexist, and offensive to us as Asian Americans. Nineteen years later, this hasn't changed." Vietnamese American activist Denise Huynh recounts her experience attending the production and the stereotypes making her feel physically ill.

Sarah Bellamy, co-artistic director of the Penumbra Theatre, dedicated to African American theater, stated: "It gets a lot easier to wrap your head around all of this for folks of color when we remember a key point: this work is not for us. It is by, for, and about white people, using people of color, tropical climes, pseudo-cultural costumes and props, violence, tragedy, and the commodification of people and cultures, to reinforce and re-inscribe a narrative about white supremacy and authority."

The American scholar Yutian Wong described Miss Saigon as promoting the image of "an effeminized and infantized Asia serving as a low-budget whorehouse for the West". The fact that the Vietnam war impoverished many Vietnamese people and forced many women to turn to prostitution in order to survive is not mentioned in Miss Saigon, and establishments such as the fictional Dreamland brothel are portrayed as the norm in Vietnam. In 1999, when Miss Saigon was closing in London, a new advertising campaign was launched on the Tube featuring posters reading "You'll miss Saigon" that showed an Asian woman wearing a military jacket showing some cleavage, which Wong felt sent the message that "Asia equals prostitution".

American scholar Karen Shimakawa argued that the romance between the Marine Chris with Kim was intended as a message by Boublil and Schönberg about the legitimacy and justice of the Vietnam war with the submissive Kim looking up to Chris to protect and save her from her own people. The wedding between Chris and Kim is seen by the former as a mere spectacle for him to enjoy rather than representing a binding commitment on his part to Kim, and he is very surprised to learn later on that Kim considers him to be her husband, an aspect of his character that he is not criticized for. Instead, Ellen explains to Kim that under American law she is Chris's wife, and Kim just merely accepts the supremacy of American law over Vietnamese law, which Shimakawa argued represents the viewpoint that Vietnam is merely just a place that provides exotic spectacles for Chris and other Americans to enjoy.

The Trinidadian-Canadian critic Richard Fung wrote in 1994: "If Miss Saigon were the only show about sexually available Asian women and money-grubbing Asian men, it wouldn't be a stereotype and there would be no protest—negative portrayals per se are not a problem". Fung argued that the way in which films, television and plays repeated such stereotypes ad nauseam had a damaging effect on the self-esteem of Asian-Americans, especially Asian-American women.

The Overture Center for the Arts in Madison, Wisconsin had planned to host a touring production of Miss Saigon in April 2019 and had scheduled a panel discussion to showcase Asian American perspectives on the musical's treatment of Asian characters. The Center then postponed the panel discussion indefinitely, prompting a teach-in by the panel's organizers and scheduled speakers. "Shame on Overture for making a profit off the bodies of Asian bodies and Asian lives", said Nancy Vue of Freedom Inc. "If you are a white woman, you should be outraged because this play pits white woman against Asian women. You should be outraged that it does that because we ought to be working together."

== Recordings ==
- Miss Saigon – Original London Cast Recording

Character	The Original Cast Recording	The Complete Symphonic Recording	The Definitive Live Recording
Kim	Lea Salonga	Joanna Ampil	Eva Noblezada
The Engineer	Jonathan Pryce	Kevin Gray	Jon Jon Briones
Chris	Simon Bowman	Peter Cousens	Alistair Brammer
John	Peter Polycarpou	Hinton Battle	Hugh Maynard
Ellen	Claire Moore	Ruthie Henshall	Tamsin Carroll
Thuy	Keith Burns	Charles Azulay	Kwang-Ho Hong
Gigi	Isay Alvarez	Sonia Swaby	Rachelle Ann Go

== Critical response ==
The Village Voice critic Michael Feingold despised "Miss Saigon", describing it as "implausible", "trite and savorless", "a trick of exploitation", and worse.

By contrast, reviewing the original Broadway production, Frank Rich for the New York Times felt the musical was "a gripping entertainment of the old school...Among other pleasures, it offers lush melodies, spectacular performances...and a good cry". Rich argued that the lyrics were sometimes shallow and the characters of Chris and Ellen rather vague, but that the power of the music and the lead performances of Salonga and Pryce made the audience forget those issues.

== Awards and nominations ==
Though the show has received awards and acclaim, it lost the Best Musical Award at the 1989/1990 Laurence Olivier Awards to Return to the Forbidden Planet in London.

Upon its Broadway opening in 1991 the musical was massively hyped as the best musical of the year, both critically and commercially. It broke several Broadway records, including a record advance-ticket sales at $24 million, highest priced ticket at $100, and repaying investors in fewer than 39 weeks.

Miss Saigon and The Will Rogers Follies led the 1991 Tony Award nominations with eleven nominations. According to The New York Times, "Will Rogers and Miss Saigon had both earned 11 nominations and were considered the front-runners for the Tony as best musical. But many theatre people predicted that Miss Saigon, an import from London, would be the victim of a backlash. There is lingering bitterness against both the huge amount of publicity Miss Saigon has received and the battle by its producer, Cameron Mackintosh, to permit its two foreign stars, Mr. Pryce and the Filipina actress Lea Salonga, to re-create on Broadway their number one award-winning roles."

The show lost to The Will Rogers Follies for several major awards, though Lea Salonga, Jonathan Pryce and Hinton Battle all won awards for their respective performances.

=== Original West End production ===
Year	Award Ceremony	Category	Nominee	Result
1990	Laurence Olivier Award	Best New Musical		Nominated
1990	Laurence Olivier Award	Best Actor in a Leading Role in a Musical	Jonathan Pryce	Won
1990	Laurence Olivier Award	Best Actress in a Leading Role in a Musical	Lea Salonga	Won
1990	Laurence Olivier Award	Best Director	Nicholas Hytner	Nominated

=== Original Broadway production ===
Year	Award Ceremony	Category	Nominee	Result
1991	Tony Award	Best Musical		Nominated
1991	Tony Award	Best Book of a Musical	Claude-Michel Schönberg and Alain Boublil	Nominated
1991	Tony Award	Best Original Score	Claude-Michel Schönberg, Alain Boublil and Richard Maltby Jr.	Nominated
1991	Tony Award	Best Performance by a Leading Actor in a Musical	Jonathan Pryce	Won
1991	Tony Award	Best Performance by a Leading Actress in a Musical	Lea Salonga	Won
1991	Tony Award	Best Performance by a Featured Actor in a Musical	Hinton Battle	Won
1991	Tony Award	Best Performance by a Featured Actor in a Musical	Willy Falk	Nominated
1991	Tony Award	Best Choreography	Bob Avian	Nominated
1991	Tony Award	Best Direction of a Musical	Nicholas Hytner	Nominated
1991	Tony Award	Best Scenic Design	John Napier	Nominated
1991	Tony Award	Best Lighting Design	David Hersey	Nominated
1991	Drama Desk Award	Outstanding Actor in a Musical	Jonathan Pryce	Won
1991	Drama Desk Award	Outstanding Actress in a Musical	Lea Salonga	Won
1991	Drama Desk Award	Outstanding Orchestrations	William David Brohn	Won
1991	Drama Desk Award	Outstanding Lighting Design	David Hersey	Won
1991	Theatre World Award		Lea Salonga	Won

=== 2014 West End revival ===
Year	Award	Category	Nominee	Result
2015	Laurence Olivier Award	Best Musical Revival		Nominated
2015	Laurence Olivier Award	Best Actor in a Leading Role in a Musical	Jon Jon Briones	Nominated

=== 2017 Broadway revival ===
Year	Award Ceremony	Category	Nominee	Result
2017	Drama League Awards	Outstanding Revival of a Broadway or Off-Broadway Musical		Nominated
2017	Drama League Awards	Distinguished Performance	Eva Noblezada	Nominated
2017	Drama Desk Awards	Outstanding Actor in a Musical	Jon Jon Briones	Nominated
2017	Outer Critics Circle Awards	Outstanding Revival of a Musical		Nominated
2017	Tony Awards	Best Revival of a Musical		Nominated
2017	Tony Awards	Best Actress in a Leading Role in a Musical	Eva Noblezada	Nominated

== Film adaptation ==
On 21 October 2009, a film version of the musical was reported to be in "early stages of development". Producer Paula Wagner was reported to be teaming with the original musical producer Cameron Mackintosh to create a film version of the musical. Filming locations are said to be Cambodia and quite possibly Ho Chi Minh City (the former Saigon).

Cameron Mackintosh reported that the film version of Miss Saigon depended on whether the Les Misérables film was a success. In August 2013, director Lee Daniels announced hopes to get a film adaptation off the ground.

On 27 February 2016, at the closing night of the Miss Saigon London revival, Mackintosh hinted that the film adaptation was close to being produced when he said, "Sooner rather than later, the movie won't just be in my mind". As well as this, the 2014 "25th anniversary" performance of Miss Saigon in London was filmed for an autumn cinema broadcast.

== See also ==
- Tears of Heaven – Another Vietnam-set musical, from 2011 by composer Frank Wildhorn, set in the lead up to and during the Tet Offensive.
