= Joanna Ampil =

Filipino singer and actress

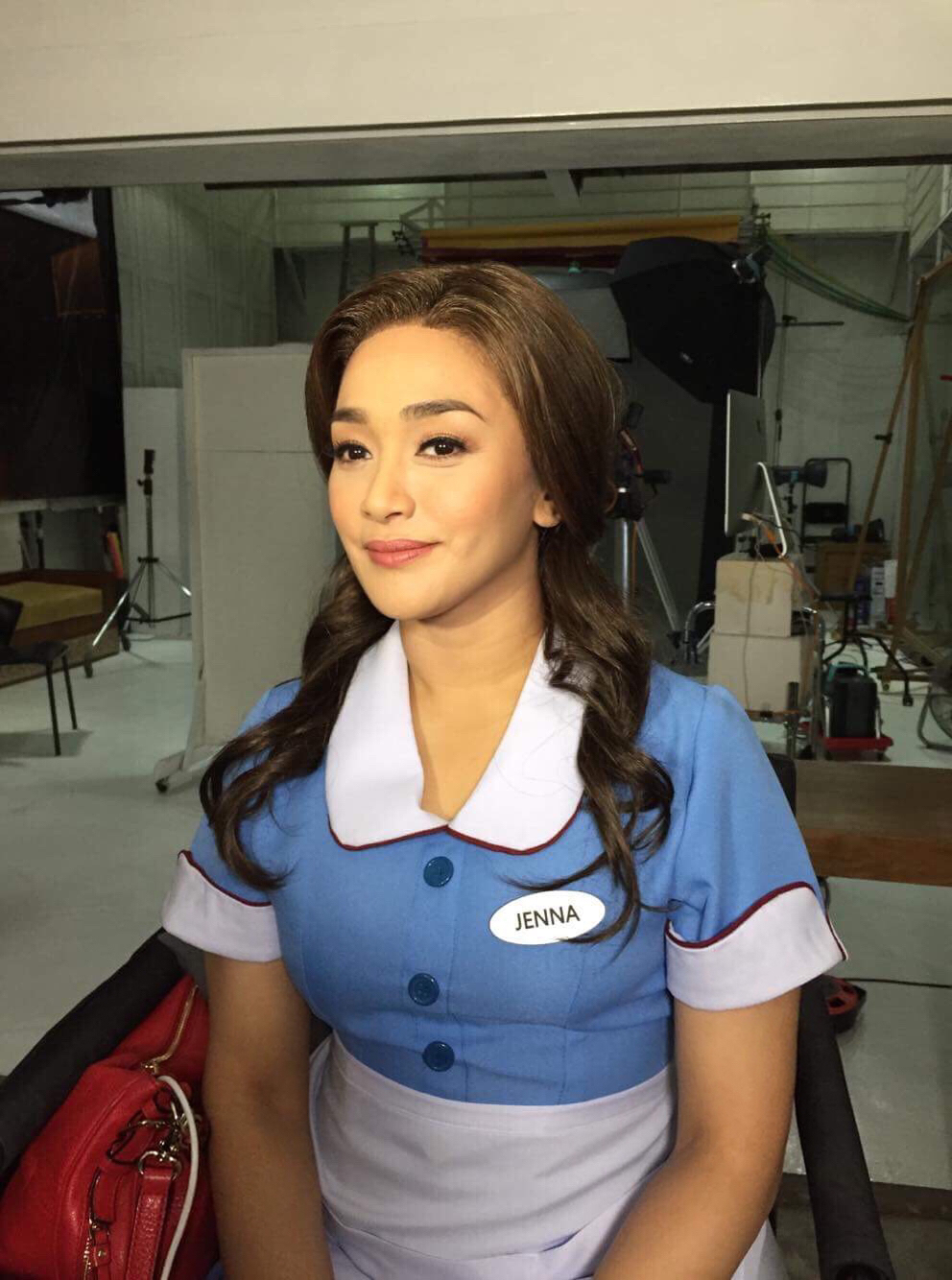
- Born: Manila, Philippines
- Occupations: singer, actress
- Website: joannaampil.com

Joanna Ampil is a musical theatre and film actress from the Philippines and United Kingdom.

== Career ==
Joanna, at seventeen years old, auditioned for an open call in Manila for the original production of Miss Saigon in front of director Sir Nicolas Hytner. Despite not having any experience in theatre or the performing arts, she landed the lead role of Kim and was flown to London to rehearse with the West End company at the Theatre Royal Drury Lane. She has since reprised her role as Kim in the original Australian production, the original United Kingdom and Ireland Tour and 10th Anniversary Performance.

Ampil's other notable roles include Mary Magdalene in the West End revival of Jesus Christ Superstar, Éponine and Fantine in Les Misérables, Mimi in Rent, Christmas Eve in Avenue Q, Sheila Franklin in Hair, Thanh in the world premiere of The Real Love, Heidi in I Sing!, The ingénue June in the West End premiere of The Musical of Musicals: The Musical!, Blue Fairy in Pinocchio: A New Musical, West End Women (UK Tour), The Magic of Disney in Concert (Hyde Park, London), Defying Gravity: The Songs of Stephen Schwartz (Sydney), Grizabella in Cats, and reprising Mary Magdalene in Jesus Christ Superstar in Concert.

In 2008, she made her Philippine theatre debut as Maria in West Side Story, alongside Christian Bautista's Tony. She played Maria Von Trapp in The Sound of Music, at the Newport Performing Arts Theatre and was followed by Nellie Forbush in South Pacific in Concert. She was invited by Philippine's Prima Ballerina Lisa Macuja-Elizalde to play Inang Bayan in the ballet Rebel EDSA 30. In 2015, she played Francesca Johnson in the international premiere of The Bridges of Madison County, and Jenna in the international premiere of Waitress in 2018.

She performed on recordings of Miss Saigon (The Complete Symphonic Recording) as Kim, Jesus Christ Superstar (1996 London Revival Cast) as Mary Magdalene, The Postman and the Poet (Concept Cast) as Beatriz Gonzalez and Ang Larawan “The Portrait” (Original Soundtrack) as Candida.

Her debut musicals album "Joanna Ampil" was released 2007 by JAY Records, followed with pop albums "Try Love" in 2010 and "Joanna Ampil" in 2014 with VIVA Records. Her latest singles are Reach for the Stars, Always Better and Memory.

In 2017, Ampil portrayed Candida Marasigan in the feature film Ang Larawan for which she won the Metro Manila Film Festival Award for Best Actress, PMPC Star Awards, Gawad Pasado, Luna, Gawad Tangi, Guillermo Award, Urduja Best Heritage Film Awards and the prestigious Gawad Urian Best Actress Awards.

She worked on the television series "Call Me Tita" "Babae Sa Septic Tank 3", The Quest, Mummy Autopsy and Broken News. She portrayed Corazon in Maalaala Mo Kaya's "Kadena" wherein she won the GEMS Award for Best Actress for Television.

She performed Grizabella in the 40th Anniversary Tour of Cats (South Korea, 2020/2021) during the height of COVID-19 pandemic with socially distanced audiences and local government protocols; along with Phantom of the Opera World Tour (South Korea and Taiwan, 2020).

In the summer of 2021, Joanna made her Chichester Festival Theatre debut in Rodgers and Hammerstein's South Pacific as Bloody Mary. In the summer of 2022, she reprised the role of Bloody Mary in London ahead of a UK Tour.

In 2023, she played The Engineer in the brand new production Miss Saigon at Sheffield Theatres by special arrangement with Sir Cameron Mackintosh, bringing together the original creators of the show Claude-Michel Schönberg and Alain Boublil along with Artistic Directors Robert Hastie and Anthony Lau in editing the book, lyrics and creating new arrangements for the reimagined production.

Joanna joined international stars of the stage and screen, including Michael Ball, Daniel Dae Kim, Maria Friedman, Audra McDonald, Julian Ovenden, Lucy St. Louis, Aaron Tveit, Marisha Wallace and Patrick Wilson in My Favorite Things: The Rodgers & Hammerstein 80th Anniversary Concert, featuring a 40-piece orchestra on 12 December 2023, at the Theatre Royal Drury Lane. The filmed musical concert will be screened in cinemas across the UK, Ireland, Australia, New Zealand, and North America, and was part of the PBS Great Performances broadcast in Spring 2024.

Since 2024, she has played Carlotta Giudicelli in The Phantom of the Opera at His Majesty’s Theatre.

== Theatre ==
Year	Title	Role	Notes
1993-1995	Miss Saigon	Kim	West End (Theatre Royal Drury Lane)
1995-1996	Miss Saigon	Kim	Sydney "Original Australian Production" (Capitol Theatre)
1996-1998	Jesus Christ Superstar	Mary Magdalene	West End "West End Revival" (Lyceum Theatre)
1998-1999	Miss Saigon	Kim	West End (Theatre Royal Drury Lane) 10th Anniversary Performance (September 20, 1999)
2000-2001	Les Misérables	Eponine	West End (Palace Theatre)
2001	Les Misérables in Concert	Eponine	Belfast, Odyssey Arena
2001-2002	Miss Saigon	Kim	UK Tour "Original UK and Ireland Tour"
2003-2005	Les Misérables	Fantine	West End
2004	Les Misérables in Concert	Fantine	Winsdor Castle "Entente Cordiale"
2005	Hair	Sheila Franklin	West End
2006	Rent	Mimi	European Tour
2006	I Sing!	Heidi	West End "Original London Cast" (Union Theatre)
2006	The Musical of Musicals: The Musical!	The ingenue June	West End "Original London Cast"
2007-2008	Les Misérables	Fantine	West End (Queen's Theatre)
2008	West Side Story	Maria	Manila (Meralco Theater)
2008-2009	Avenue Q	Christmas Eve	West End (Noël Coward Theatre) (Gielgud Theatre)
2010	Pinocchio: A New Musical	Blue Fairy	Singapore "World Premiere" (DBS Arts Centre)
2011	The Real Love	Thanh	Los Angeles "World Premiere" (Pasadena Civic Auditorium)
2011-2012	The Sound of Music	Maria	Manila (Newport Performing Arts Theatre)
2013-2014	Cats	Grizabella	New Wimbledon Theatre UK Tour European Tour
2015	South Pacific in Concert	Nellie Forbush	Newport Performing Arts Theatre
2015	Ballet Manila's Rebel	Inang Bayan	Manila "World Premiere" (Aliw Theatre)
2015	The Bridges of Madison County	Francesca Johnson	Manila "International Premiere" (Carlos P. Romulo Auditorium)
2016	Cats	Grizabella	European Tour
2016	Ballet Manila's Rebel	Inang Bayan	Aliw Theatre
2017-2018	Cats	Grizabella	Middle Eastern Tour European Tour Asian Tour
2018	Waitress	Jenna	Manila "International Premiere" (Carlos P. Romulo Auditorium)
2019	Jesus Christ Superstar in Concert	Mary Magdalene	Tokyu Theatre Orb
2019-2020	Cats	Grizabella	Asian Tour
2020-2021	Cats	Grizabella	40th Anniversary Tour
2021	South Pacific	Bloody Mary	Chichester Festival Theatre
2022	Cats	Grizabella	Asian Tour
2022	South Pacific	Bloody Mary	London (Sadler's Wells) UK Tour
2022-2023	Cats	Grizabella	2023 Jellicle Ball Tour
2023	Miss Saigon	The Engineer	Crucible Theatre
2024	Your Lie in April: The Musical	Saki Arima	Theatre Royal Drury Lane
2024-2026	The Phantom of The Opera	Carlotta Giudicelli	His Majesty's Theatre
2027	Sunset Boulevard	Norma Desmond	Asian Tour

== Discography ==
=== Cast albums ===
- My Favorite Things: The Rodgers & Hammerstein 80th Anniversary Concert
- Miss Saigon (The Complete Symphonic Recording)
- Jesus Christ Superstar (1996 London Cast)
- The Postman and The Poet (Concept Cast)
- Ang Larawan (Original Soundtrack)

=== Studio albums ===
- Joanna Ampil (2007; Jay Records)
- Try Love (2010; Musiko Records, Sony Music)
- Joanna Ampil (2014; Viva Records)

=== Singles ===
- Reach For The Stars
- I'm Caught Between Goodbye and I Love You
- For The Last Time I Felt Like This
- Hanggang Saan
- The Only Place To Be
- Memory
- Always Better
- Kundimang Mahal (theme song of the movie Culion)
- One More Gift

== Filmography ==
=== Film ===
Year	Title	Role	Notes
2011	One Day	Waitress	
2011	The Real Love	Thanh	
2017	Ang Larawan	Candida Marasigan	Best Actress: Metro Manila Film Festival 2017, PMPC Star Awards, Gawad Pasado, Luna, Gawad Tangi, Guillermo Award, Urduja Best Heritage Film Awards, Gawad Urian
2019	Babae Sa Septic Tank 3	Herself/Narcisa	
2021	The Show Must Go On	Herself/Grizabella	
2024	My Favorite Things: The Rodgers & Hammerstein 80th Anniversary Concert	Herself	

=== Television/Digital ===
Year	Title	Role	Notes
1999	The Quest	Herself	
2004	Mummy Autopsy	Filipino Woman	
2005	Broken News	Michelle Wong	
2018	Leading Women	Herself	
2019	Bulawan: The CCP 50th Anniversary Gala	Herself	
2019	Babae Sa Septic Tank 3	Herself/Narcisa	
2019	Maalaala Mo Kaya's "Kadena"	Corazon	Best Actress, GEMS Award for Best Actress for Television
2019	Call Me Tita	Maya	
2022	Flower of Evil	Daniel's Mother	
2024	My Favorite Things: The Rodgers & Hammerstein 80th Anniversary Concert	Herself	Sky Arts & PBS

== Concerts ==
- Carols in the Domain (1995) The Domain, Sydney
- Stars of the Musicals (2001) Putra, Kuala Lumpur
- The Night of 100 Stars: Marvin Hamlisch (2001) London Palladium
- One Day More: A Symphonic Concert of Alain Boublil and Claude-Michel Schönberg (2004) Symphony Hall, Birmingham
- An Evening with Jason Robert Brown (2005) Players Theatre, London
- Musical Moments (2007) Hong Kong Cultural Centre
- Musical Moments (2008) Hong Kong Cultural Centre
- Musical Moments (2009) Hong Kong Cultural Centre
- Joanna Ampil, I Love... (2009) Music Museum, Manila
- West End Girl: Joanna Ampil (2010) OnStage, Manila
- Brad Little Unmasked with Joanna Ampil (2010) Taipei International Convention Centre, Taiwan
- Broadway Showstoppers (2011) Newport Performing Arts Theatre
- The Vietnam-Philippines Friendship Concert (2012) Hanoi Opera House, Vietnam
- The Night of 1000 Voices (2012) Royal Albert Hall, London
- The Magic of Disney in Concert (2012) Hyde Park, London In celebration of the H.M. The Queen's Diamond Jubilee
- West End Women: Kerry Ellis, Ria Jones & Joanna Ampil (2014) United Kingdom Tour
- Defying Gravity: The Songs of Stephen Schwartz (2016) Sydney
- A Woman's World: Joanna Ampil (2016) Shangri-La Plaza, Manila
- The Sound of Musicals: Joanna Ampil, Graham Bickley, Kerry Ellis and Oliver Tompsett (2016) United Kingdom Tour
- Una nit a Broadway Andrew Lloyd Webber: Joanna Ampil, John Owen Jones, Geronimo Rauch and Celinde Schoenmacher (2017) L'Auditori, Barcelona
- Love Wins: Joanna Ampil (2018) Maybank Theatre, Manila
- Silver Lining: Joanna Ampil (2019) Maybank Theatre, Manila
- Pinoy Playlist: Joanna Ampil (2019) Maybank Theatre, Manila
- Bulawan: The CCP's 50th Anniversary Gala (2023) Cultural Center of the Philippines, Manila
- Fivera Goes West End with Joanna Ampil (2023) Singapore Botanic Gardens, Singapore
- Fivera Goes West End with Joanna Ampil (2023) Esplanade Theatre, Singapore
- Anywhere We Sing Is Home: The CCP's 54th Anniversary Gala (2023) Samsung Performing Arts Theatre, Manila
- West End Musical Halloween (2023) Lyric Theatre, London
- West End Does: Christmas (2023) Cadogan Hall, London
- My Favorite Things: The Rodgers & Hammerstein 80th Anniversary Concert (2023) Theatre Royal Drury Lane, London
