= Jérôme Pradon =

French actor and singer (born 1964)

- Born: 3 June 1964 (age 62); Boulogne-Billancourt, France
- Occupations: Actor and Singer
- Years active: 1980–present
- Website: http://www.jeromepradon.com

Jérôme Pradon (born 3 June 1964) is a French actor and singer who has performed in the West End, in Paris, and in various other places around the world. He was born in Boulogne-Billancourt, Hauts-de-Seine, France.

== Theatre ==
In 1991, Pradon made his musical debut in Alain Boublil and Claude-Michel Schönberg's Les Misérables, as Marius at the Theatre Mogador in Paris. This show led to his first West End appearance where he played the role of Chris in Miss Saigon (1992–93). He followed this with a debut in Toronto, Canada, where he originated the title role of Napoleon (1994).

In 1995, travelling back and forth between France and England, Pradon performed in several productions including La Java des Mémoires, directed by Roger Louret and Assassins by Stephen Sondheim. Later that year, he played the role of student revolutionary Courfeyrac in the 10th anniversary run of Les Misérables.

Remaining in London, Pradon created the role of Guillaume in the Olivier Award winning production Martin Guerre, which made him the first actor to have performed major roles in all three Boublil and Schonberg musicals. After that came Maury Yeston's Nine at the Folies Bergère, where Pradon played Guido Contini, the sole male role.

In 1998 Pradon performed in Killing Rasputin, and in 2000 performed in Black Goes with Everything (a show celebrating the talent of Don Black) and Andrew Lloyd Webber's Whistle Down the Wind where he played the role of The Man alongside Laura Michelle Kelly as Swallow. In 2000, he also appeared in the role of Judas in a production of Jesus Christ Superstar, opposite Glenn Carter as Jesus.

Pradon attended the 2001 Edinburgh Festival Fringe with his one-man show Crime of Passion, a British premiere. This was followed by another one-man show, in Paris, Road Movie. Pradon played all five roles in the play, and he translated the text into French. He later reprised this show in 2002. Also that year, he was a principal performer in Délit D'Ivresse, the last piece by Roland Petit; took part in the spectacular gala charity concert A Night Of 1000 Voices; played Javert in Les Misérables at the Palace Theatre, London, and performed at the Opening Gala for the first International Festival of Musical Theatre in Cardiff.

In 2003, Pradon played the roles of Shogun's mother and the French Admiral in the award-winning musical Pacific Overtures, for which he was nominated for an Olivier Award. This was followed by Et Si On Chantait?, produced by Pierre Cardin, and the award-winning Chance!

2004 saw Pradon perform in One Day More! a symphonic concert celebrating Boublil and Schönberg's works; perform at Windsor Castle in a Les Misérables concert as part of the marking of the 100th anniversary of the Entente Cordiale, and play King Herod in the Scandinavian tour of Jesus Christ Superstar.

In 2005, Pradon made his Liège debut in Maury Yeston's Titanic. In 2006, he performed at the Les Musicals Festival in Béziers and was also nominated as Best Actor for the year of 2005. Later that year, Pradon starred as several different characters in the Molière Award winning Le Cabaret Des Hommes Perdus. This multi-award-winning musical was such a hit that it extended its run into 2007. From Paris to London, Pradon took on the role of Aragorn in the European premiere of The Lord of the Rings.

Pradon's next project was L'Opera De Sarah, which was performed in Paris in 2009. He next appeared in the French production of Mamma Mia! playing Sam.

In 2018, he played the role of George in Aspects of Love at the Hope Mill Theatre, Manchester, and again in 2019 at the Southwark Playhouse. He received the 2020 Offie for Best Male in a Supporting Role in a Musical.

== TV and film ==
Pradon's TV and film appearances include his first paid acting job Marcheloup, L'été '36, Cas De Divorce and Hélas Pour Moi directed by Jean Luc Goddard. Sharpe's Company took Pradon to Ukraine for filming and onto British screens. Kung Fu: The Legend Continues was filmed during his time in Napoleon. The Brylcreem Boys (for which he was asked to emphasize the French accent more) was released in limited UK cinemas in 1999. Also that year, Simon Sez, seeing Pradon play the villain of the movie, was released in the US.

French productions include Belle Grand-Mere, La Jeune Fille et La Tortue directed by Stéphane Ly-Cuong; the award winning Crimes En Serie, Avocats et Associés and film festival winner Paradisco, also directed by Stéphane Ly-Cuong.

English speaking productions include the RTS Award-nominated Aristocrats; Oscar nominated Vatel directed by Roland Joffé; The Dancer playing The Director; the International Emmy award winning 2000 Great Performances of Jesus Christ Superstar, playing Judas for which his performance received rave reviews and a new collection of fans, and Peter Ackroyd's London and Carrie and Barry.

In 2004, he organized the casting for and performed the part of André in the French dubbing of the 2004 The Phantom of the Opera movie.

2006 saw the sitcom The Complete Guide to Parenting, starring Peter Davison, that was broadcast on ITV, with Jérôme playing the part of Roland, and 2007 saw Jérôme starring in Trafalgar, directed by Fabrice Hourlier.

== Radio ==
Radio credits include National Music Day, numerous appearances on Friday Night Is Music Night and Somewhere In The Desert.

Pradon is also a songwriter. He has written songs for Jean Guidoni's Tigre de Porcelaine album as well as for himself (he released the single "Tendrement", 1987). He is working on a pop, rock and electro album.

== Discography ==
- The Lord of the Rings (2007)
- Le Cabaret Des Hommes Perdus (2006)
- Les Bienheureux De La Marge Brute (2005)
- Chance! (2004)
- Crime of Passion (2001)
- Jesus Christ Superstar (2000)
- Killing Rasputin (1999)
- Martin Guerre (1996)
- Les Misérables – 10th Anniversary Concert (1995)
- Napoleon (1994)
- Les Misérables (1991)

Singles

- Tendrement (1987)
