= Miss Saigon (original London cast recording) =

Cast recording by the original London cast
- Released: 1990
- Label: Geffen

Miss Saigon, subtitled Original London Cast Recording, is a double album containing a recording of Alain Boublil and Claude-Michel Schönberg's musical Miss Saigon made by its original 1989 West End, London, cast. The album was released in 1990 on Geffen. A shorter, single-disc "Highlights" version was also available.

== Background ==
The album was produced by Alain Boublil and Claude-Michel Schönberg.

== Critical reception ==
Professional ratings
Review scores
| Source | Rating |
|---|---|
| AllMusic | 4.5/5 stars |

Professional ratings
Highlights from Miss Saigon
Review scores
| Source | Rating |
|---|---|
| AllMusic | 4.5/5 stars |

In a retrospective review, AllMusic rates both the 2-disc and the 1-disc "Highlights" versions of the album 4.5 on a scale of 5. William Ruhlmann notes that "the score has the same rock feel as Schönberg's Les Miserables." Among the cast, he singles out Jonathan Pryce as a "pimp named the Engineer", who "stands out", in his opinion.

== Track listing ==
2 × LP – Geffen Records 7599-24271-1 (WX 329)

Lyrics by Richard Maltby, Jr. and Alain Boublil.

Side one

Saigon – April 1975

1. "Overture" – 3:21
2. "The Heat Is On in Saigon" – 4:37
3. "The Movie in My Mind" – 4:38
4. "Why God Why?" – 4:52
5. "Sun and Moon" – 2:56
6. "The Telephone Song" – 1:47
7. "The Deal" – 0:57

Side two

Saigon – April 1975

1. "The Ceremony (Dju Vui Vai)" – 3:11
2. "What's This I Find" – 2:07
3. "The Last Night of the World" – 4:25

Ho Chi Minh City – April 1978

4. The Morning of the Dragon" – 2:10
5. "I Still Believe" – 4:32
6. "This Is the Hour" – 6:35

Side three

Ho Chi Minh City – April 1978

1. "If You Want to Die in Bed" – 3:38
2. "Let Me See His Western Nose" – 3:02
3. "I'd Give My Life for You" – 6:20

Atlanta – September 1978

4. "Bui – Doi" – 4:05

Bangkok – October 1978

5. "What a Waste" – 4:30
6. "Please" – 2:50

Side four

Saigon – April 1975

1. "The Fall of Saigon" – 4:53

Bangkok – October 1978

2. "Her or Me" – 2:58
3. "The Confrontation" – 4:02
4. "The American Dream" – 4:43
5. "The Sacred Bird" – 4:07
6. "Finale" – 1:56

== Charts ==
| Chart (1995) | Peak position |
|---|---|
| German Albums (Offizielle Top 100) | 78 |
| Dutch Albums (Album Top 100) | 36 |

=== Highlights from Miss Saigon ===
| Chart (1995) | Peak position |
|---|---|
| Dutch Albums (Album Top 100) | 33 |

== Certifications ==
| Region | Certification | Certified units/sales |
|---|---|---|
| United States (RIAA) | Platinum | 1,000,000^{^} |
^{^} Shipments figures based on certification alone.
