= Eric Kunze =

American stage actor and singer (born 1971)

- Born: May 22, 1971 (age 55); San Diego, California
- Occupations: Singer, actor
- Instrument: Vocals
- Years active: 1991–present

Eric Kunze (pronounced "Koon-zee"; born May 22, 1971) is an American stage actor and singer. He showed an early aptitude for singing and was involved in choir and theater at Rancho Buena Vista High School. He is best known for his roles on Broadway.

== Life and career ==
Kunze was born in San Diego, California. He attended theater studies at University of California, Irvine. In his junior year, the students traveled to New York to expand their education through workshops. While there, Eric auditioned for and landed the role of Marius on Broadway in Les Misérables at the age of 20. When not on the road, Kunze and his long-time friend Gina Feliccia have a production company called Big City Broadway. Kunze studied acting with Uta Hagen and Robert Cohen, among others and dance training from Susan Stroman, among others.

After his Broadway debut as Marius in Les Misérables (opposite Lea Salonga) Kunze went on to star in two more Broadway roles, as Chris in Miss Saigon and then as Joe Hardy in Damn Yankees (with Jerry Lewis). He later played Chris in the first National Tour of Miss Saigon. He then played the title character in the US national tour of Jesus Christ Superstar from 2003 to 2005. He later starred as "The Man" in the US national touring company of Whistle Down the Wind (2007–2008). Kunze appeared in "The Music of Andrew Lloyd Webber" (2008) at the Kennedy Center and many concert appearances including the 33rd Anniversary Gala for the Boston Pops at Carnegie Hall (2016).

Off-Broadway, he has appeared in Leopard's Leap, directed by Michael Rupert. International Tours included The Fantasticks, The Pirates of Penzance and The Mikado. He starred in the title role of Joseph and the Amazing Technicolor Dreamcoat at The Muny, KC Starlight at Sacramento Music Circus and San Diego CLO, earning a San Diego Critics Circle Nomination. Other regional theatre includes Evita (in which he received a LA Ovation Nomination), West Side Story, Into the Woods, the title role in Pippin (earning a LA Robbie Award), South Pacific and the title role in The Who's Tommy in Los Angeles.

In 2016, he played Bruce Bechdel in the first international production of Fun Home, which premiered in Manila, reuniting with his Les Mis co-star Lea Salonga as Helen and Cris Villonco as Alison. The production was directed by Bobby Garcia. A review in ABS-CBN News said that he plays Bruce "with charm, ambiguity and just the right amount of menace and pomposity as he grapples with his obsession with outward order and his own secret longings."

== Credits ==
- Mamma Mia, La Mirada Theatre, CA 2021
- Next to Normal, (Dan) Riverside Theatre, Vero Beach, 2019
- Mamma Mia (Sam), Riverside Theatre, Vero Beach, Walnut Street Theatre, Philadelphia, Music Circus, Sacramento Musical Theatre, CA, 2018
- An Evening With Eric Kunze, 2018 Rubicon Theatre, Ventura, CA
- Broadway at Good Theater 2017 (concert) Portland, Maine
- Song and Dance of Broadway 2017 (concert) Tokyo, Japan
- The Little Mermaid US Tour June–November, 2017 (Prince Eric),
- Fun Home (musical) (Bruce Bechdel) 2016, 2017 Carlos P. Romulo Auditorium, Manila, Philippines
- The Hunchback of Notre Dame 2016 (Captain Phoebus de Martin) Broadway At Music Circus Sacramento, CA
- The Hunchback of Notre Dame 2016 (Captain Phoebus de Martin) La Mirada Theatre for the Performing Arts, La Mirada, CA
- The Little Mermaid (Prince Eric) 2016 Broadway At Music Circus sacramento, CA; 2015 Houston; Dallas; Austin; Ft. Worth; New Orleans
- The Little Mermaid (Prince Eric) 2016 La Mirada Theatre for the Performing Arts
- Do You Hear the People Sing (Soloist) 2016 33rd Birthday Gala for the New York Pops, Carnegie Hall, NY
- Do You Hear the People Sing (Soloist) 2016 Oklahoma City Pops, OK
- The Little Mermaid (Prince Eric) 2015 Houston, TX Hobby Center; New Orleans, LA Saenger Theatre; San Antonio, TX, Majestic Theatre; Austin, TX Bass Hall; Minneapolis, Minn, Orpheum; Broadway Sacramento; Dallas, TX Music Hall at Fair Park; Fort Worth TX: Bass Hall
- Do You Hear the People Sing (Soloist) 2015 Kennedy Center, Washington DC; Plano, TX; Milwaukee, Wis
- South Pacific 2014 (Lt. Cable) Broadway At Music Circus Sacramento, CA
- The Little Mermaid (Prince Eric) 2014 National Tour (Prince Eric) Dallas, Houston, Atlanta
- Grease 2013 (Teen Angel) Walnut Street Theater, Philadelphia, PA
- An Evening With Eric Kunze (Cabaret) 2013 Hartford, CT, Sun City, CA, Lake Havasu, AZ, Sacramento, CA
- Grease 2013 (Teen Angel) Riverside Theater, Vero Beach. FL
- The Little Mermaid July, 2012 (Prince Eric) Broadway At Music Circus sacramento, CA
- Do You Hear the People Sing 2012-2014 (Soloist) Ottawa, Mazatlan, Dallas, Pittsburgh, Baltimore, Bethesda, Ottawa, Mazatlan, Hartford, Salt Lake
- Joseph and the Amazing Technicolor Dreamcoat (Joseph), San Diego Musical Theater, CA
- Miss Saigon August, 2011 (Chris), Broadway At Music Circus Sacramento, CA
- Miss Saigon May, 2011 (Chris), Walnut Street Theater, Philadelphia, PA
- Damn Yankees July, 2010 (Joe Hardy) Muny, St. Louis, MO
- Music of the Night May, 2010 (Soloist) with the Detroit Symphony Orchestra
- Joseph and the Amazing Technicolor Dreamcoat (Joseph) April, 2010 Civic Light Opera of South Bay Cities, Redondo Beach, CA
- Miss Saigon (as Chris) February, 2010 Theater Under the Stars (TUTS) in Houston, Texas
- Masquerade New Year's Eve Concert December 31, 2009 Soloist with the Cincinnati Pops
- Music of the Night October 9–10, 2009 at the Orpheum Theater in Vancouver, B.C. With the Vancouver Symphony Pops, Bramwell Tovey, conducting, with soprano Betsy Wolfe.
- Godspell (Jesus) July, 2009, Muny, St. Louis
- Jesus Christ Superstar (Jesus) April, 2009, Civic Light Opera of South Bay Cities (Ovation nomination)
- Miss Saigon (Chris), February 2009, North Carolina Theater
- The Music of Andrew Lloyd Webber Soloist, December 2008-January 2009 at the Kennedy Center in Washington, D.C.
- Evita (Che) August, 2008, Broadway At Music Circus Sacramento, CA
- Broadway -Damn Yankees as Joe Hardy (with Jerry Lewis) at the Marquis Theatre, Miss Saigon as Chris at the Broadway Theatre, and as Marius in Les Misérables at the Imperial Theatre.
- National and international tours—in Whistle Down the Wind (as "The Man"), Jesus Christ Superstar (title role, replaced Sebastian Bach), Pippin (title role), Miss Saigon (Chris), The Fantasticks(Matt) and The Pirates of Penzance (Frederick).
- Regional—in Godspell as (Jesus), Miss Saigon as (Chris), Evita (Che), West Side Story (Tony Pittsburgh), South Pacific (Lt. Joe Cable), Damn Yankees ( Joe Hardy), Jesus Christ Superstar (Jesus), Chess (Freddie), Joseph and the Amazing Technicolor Dreamcoat (Joseph), Into The Woods (Wolf), A Midsummer Night's Dream (Demetrius) and A Man For All Seasons (Master Richard).

== Awards ==
- 2002 LA Ovation nomination (Evita)
- 2008 IRNE Award winner (Best Actor - Musical Large Theater) for his portrayal of Joseph in Joseph and the Amazing Technicolor Dreamcoat (Reagle) and The Man in the National Tour of Whistle Down the Wind
- 2008 LA Ovation nomination (Miss Saigon)
- 2009 LA Ovation nomination (Best Actor in a Musical Large Theater) for his portrayal of Jesus in Jesus Christ Superstar
- 2016 Broadway in Austin (Best Leading Actor in a Touring Production) Prince Eric, The Little Mermaid
- LA Robbie Award Lead Actor Musical (Pippin)
