= Glenn Carter =

English musical theater actor (born 1964)

- Born: March 27, 1964 (age 62); Staffordshire, England
- Education: Arts Educational Schools, London
- Occupations: Actor; singer

Glenn Carter (born 27 March 1964) is an English stage actor and singer-songwriter performing leading roles in musicals staged in London's West End.

== Early life ==
Carter was born in Staffordshire, England. He trained at the Arts Educational School in London.

== Performing career ==
=== West End productions ===
Carter has appeared on London's West End stages in musical productions such as Jesus Christ Superstar, Grease, Joseph and the Amazing Technicolor Dreamcoat, Chess, Whistle Down the Wind, and Les Misérables. In 2008, Carter took up the role of "Tommy DeVito" in the London premiere of the musical, Jersey Boys, a part which he continued to play until March 2010.

Carter has been cast as Jesus in several productions of Jesus Christ Superstar. In 1996, 16 years after the closure of the original production of Jesus Christ Superstar, the Really Useful Theatre Company revived the show in the West End, in which Carter was originally cast as Simon Zealotes before replacing Steve Balsamo as Jesus. In 1998, Really Useful mounted a touring production in the UK which did not include Carter in any of the leading roles.

=== Other ===
In 2007, he starred in Merrily We Roll Along at Derby Playhouse. In 2011, Carter played the title role in Floyd Collins at Southwark Playhouse directed by Derek Bond. Carter has also worked in repertory theatre at the Derby Playhouse, his most recent role being Buzz Aldrin in "Moon Landing". He has played roles in the TV shows The Bill and Doctors. Carter was cast as the corrupt and hypocritical fictitious chat show host Patrick Chase in British music act Chase and Status video for their 2010 single "Let You Go".

A Great Performances adaptation of "Jesus Christ Superstar" premiered in the UK in 2000, starring Carter as Jesus, Jérôme Pradon as Judas, Renee Castle as Mary Magdalene and Rik Mayall as Herod. The film was directed by Gale Edwards and Nick Morris.

== Involvement with the Raëlian Movement ==
Carter has been the Leader of the UK branch of the Raëlian Movement since 2002. According to Raëlian doctrine, humans were created by extraterrestrials. The organisation's head, Raël (former auto racer Claude Vorilhon), founded the Movement in 1973 at the request of the President of the extraterrestrials′ governing body and declared that the world should be governed in the form of a "money-less society, governed by a World College of Geniuses".

In 2002, in the week following the claim by Clonaid (which has ties to Raëlism) to have cloned a human, Carter told the press "the evidence would be supplied in the next few days". In February 2003, it was announced that Carter would participate in a panel debate on the ethics of human cloning before an audience of Oxford University students.
