= Jesus Christ Superstar =

Rock opera by Andrew Lloyd Webber and Tim Rice

- Album cover for the 1970 American release of Jesus Christ Superstar
- Music: Andrew Lloyd Webber
- Lyrics: Tim Rice
- Premiere: 12 October 1971: Mark Hellinger Theatre
- Productions: 1970 Concept album; 1971 Broadway; 1972 West End; 1976 US Tour; 1977 Broadway revival; 1996 West End revival; 2000 Broadway revival; 2012 Broadway revival; 2012 UK tour; 2016 Regent's Park Open Air; 2017 Regent's Park Open Air; 2019 US tour; 2020 Regent's Park Open Air; 2023 UK tour; 2025 The Netherlands tour; 2026 West End revival; 2027 UK and Ireland tour

Jesus Christ Superstar is a sung-through rock opera with music by Andrew Lloyd Webber and lyrics by Tim Rice. Loosely based on the Gospel accounts of the Passion, the work interprets the psychology of Jesus and other characters, with much of the plot centred on Judas, who is disillusioned with the direction of Jesus' ministry. Contemporary attitudes, sensibilities, and slang pervade the rock opera's lyrics, and ironic allusions to modern life are scattered throughout the depiction of political events; stage and film productions accordingly contain many intentional anachronisms.

Initially unable to get backing for a stage production, the composers released the score as a 1970 concept album, an immediate success which led to its Broadway stage debut in 1971. By 1980, the musical had grossed more than $237 million worldwide. Running over eight years in London between 1972 and 1980, the show held the record for longest-running West End musical until 1989 (overtaken by Cats).

== Plot ==
=== Act I ===
Judas Iscariot, one of the Twelve Apostles, worries that the followers of Jesus are getting out of control and may be seen as a threat by the Roman Empire, who might harshly suppress them ("Heaven on Their Minds").

The other apostles anticipate entering Jerusalem alongside Jesus and ask him about his plans, but Jesus tells them not to worry about the future. Meanwhile, Mary Magdalene tries to help Jesus relax. Judas warns Jesus to avoid Mary because a relationship with a prostitute could be seen as inconsistent with his teachings and be used against him. Jesus scolds Judas, saying he should not judge others unless he is free of sin. Jesus then reproaches the apostles and complains that none of them truly care for him ("What's the Buzz/Strange Thing Mystifying").

Mary reassures Jesus while anointing him. Judas fumes that the money spent on fine oil should have been used to help the poor. Jesus reasons they do not have the resources to end poverty, and that they should treasure what comforts they possess ("Everything's Alright").

Meanwhile, Caiaphas, the High Priest of Israel, assembles the Pharisees and priests. Like Judas, they fear that Jesus's followers will be seen as a threat by the Romans, and that many innocent Jews might suffer the consequences. Thus, Caiaphas concludes that for the greater good, Jesus must be executed ("This Jesus Must Die"). As Jesus and his followers arrive exultantly in Jerusalem, they are confronted by Caiaphas, who demands that Jesus disperse the crowd. Jesus instead greets them ("Hosanna"). Simon the Zealot suggests that Jesus lead his mob in a war against Rome and gain absolute power ("Simon Zealotes"). Jesus rejects this, stating that none of his followers understand what true power is ("Poor Jerusalem").

Pontius Pilate, the governor of Judea, has a dream in which he meets a Galilean and then receives the blame for the man's violent death at the hands of a mob ("Pilate's Dream"). Jesus arrives at the Temple and finds that it is being used as a marketplace; angered by this, he drives everyone out. A group of lepers ask Jesus to heal them. Their number increases, and overwhelmed, Jesus rejects them ("The Temple"). Mary Magdalene sings Jesus to sleep ("Everything's Alright (Reprise)"). While he sleeps, Mary acknowledges that she is in love with him, and it frightens her ("I Don't Know How to Love Him").

Conflicted, Judas seeks out the Pharisees and proposes helping them arrest Jesus, believing that Jesus is out of control and that Jesus himself would approve of this action. In exchange for his help, Judas is offered thirty pieces of silver. Judas adamantly refuses, but then accepts upon Caiaphas's suggestion that he could use the money to help the poor ("Damned for All Time/Blood Money"). Judas tells the priests, on Thursday night, they will be finding him at the Garden of Gethsemane.

=== Act II ===
Jesus shares a Passover meal with his disciples, where they get drunk and pay little attention to him. He remarks that "for all you care" the wine they are drinking could be his blood and the bread his body. He asks them to remember him, and then, frustrated by their lack of understanding, he predicts that Peter will deny him three times that night, and that another one of them will betray him. Judas admits that he is the one who will betray Jesus and, saying that he does not understand why Jesus had no plan, leaves ("The Last Supper").

The remaining apostles fall asleep as Jesus retreats to the Garden of Gethsemane to pray. He tells God his doubts about whether his mission has had any success and pleads to find a way to avoid the horrible death that awaits him. Receiving no answer, he realises that there is no other way to complete his mission, and resigns himself to God's will ("Gethsemane (I Only Want to Say)"). Judas arrives with Roman soldiers and identifies Jesus by kissing him on the cheek. When Jesus is brought to trial before the Sanhedrin, Caiaphas and the priests send him to Pilate ("The Arrest"). Meanwhile, Peter is confronted by three witnesses of Jesus's arrest, to each of whom he denies that he knows Jesus. Mary observes that Jesus had predicted this ("Peter's Denial").

Pilate asks Jesus if he is the King of the Jews. Jesus answers: "That's what you say." Since Jesus is from Galilee, Pilate says that he is not under his jurisdiction and sends him to King Herod ("Pilate and Christ"). The flamboyant King Herod pressures Jesus to prove his divinity by performing miracles, but Jesus ignores him. Herod angrily sends him back to Pilate ("King Herod's Song"). Mary Magdalene, Peter, and the apostles remember when they first began following Jesus, and wish that they could return to a time of hope and peace ("Could We Start Again, Please?").

Judas is horrified at Jesus's harsh treatment. He expresses regret to the Pharisees, correctly dreading that he will forever be remembered as a traitor. Caiaphas and Annas assure him that he has done the right thing. Judas throws the money he was given to the floor and storms out. He curses God for manipulating him, and commits suicide ("Judas' Death").

At Jesus's trial, Pilate attempts to interrogate Jesus, but is cut off by a bloodthirsty mob which demands that Jesus be crucified. (Note: In the Broadway production, a stanza is added where Pilate admonishes the crowd for their sudden respect for Caesar, as well as for how they "produce Messiahs by the sackful"; this was kept for the film and subsequent productions.) Unnerved, he tells the mob that Jesus has committed no crime and does not deserve to die, but to satisfy the mob, he will have Jesus flogged. Pilate pleads with Jesus to defend himself, but Jesus says weakly that everything has been determined by God. The crowd still calls for Jesus's death, and finally, Pilate reluctantly agrees to crucify Jesus ("Trial Before Pilate (Including The 39 Lashes)").

As Jesus awaits crucifixion, the spirit of Judas returns and questions why Jesus chose to arrive in the manner and time that he did, and if it was all part of a divine plan after all ("Superstar"). Jesus is crucified, recites his final words, and dies ("The Crucifixion"). Jesus' body is taken down from the cross and buried ("John 19:41").

== Principal roles ==
Character	Voice type	Description
Jesus Christ	baritenor (A♭_{2}–C_{5}, falsetto to G_{5})	Title role, leader of the twelve disciples, called the "Son of God" and the "King of the Jews".
Judas Iscariot	tenor (B_{2}–D_{5}, falsetto E_{5})	One of Jesus' twelve apostles; concerned for the poor and the consequences of Jesus's fame.
Mary Magdalene	mezzo-soprano (F_{3}–E♭_{5})	A follower of Jesus who finds herself falling in love with him.
Pontius Pilate	baritenor (A_{2}–B♭_{4})	Roman Governor of Judea who foresees the events of Jesus's crucifixion from beginning to aftermath in a dream and finds himself being presented with that very situation.
Caiaphas	bass-baritone (C♯_{2}–F_{4})	High priest and leader of the Pharisees who sees Jesus as a threat to the nation.
Annas	countertenor (G_{3}–D_{5})	Fellow priest at the side of Caiaphas who is persuaded by Caiaphas into seeing Jesus as a threat.
Peter	baritone (A_{2}–G_{4})	One of Jesus's twelve apostles; denies Jesus three times upon the night of Jesus's arrest to save himself.
Simon Zealotes	tenor (G_{3}–B_{4})	One of Jesus's twelve apostles; urges Jesus to lead his followers into battle against the Romans.
King Herod	baritone (B_{2}–G_{4})	The King of Galilee; Jesus is brought to him for judgment after first being taken to Pilate.

== Musical numbers ==
Act One

- "Overture" – Orchestra
- "Heaven on Their Minds" – Judas
- "What's the Buzz/Strange Thing, Mystifying" – Jesus, Judas, Mary and Apostles
- "Everything's Alright" – Mary, Judas, Jesus, Women and Apostles
- "This Jesus Must Die" – Caiaphas, Annas, and High Priests
- "Hosanna" – Jesus, Caiaphas and Company
- "Simon Zealotes/Poor Jerusalem" – Simon, Jesus and Company
- "Pilate's Dream" – Pilate
- "The Temple" – Jesus and Ensemble
- "Everything's Alright (Reprise)" – Mary and Jesus
- "I Don't Know How to Love Him" – Mary
- "Damned for All Time/Blood Money" – Judas, Caiaphas, Annas, and Ensemble

Act Two

- "The Last Supper" – Jesus, Judas, and Apostles
- "Gethsemane (I Only Want to Say)" – Jesus
- "The Arrest" – Judas, Jesus, Peter, Apostles, Caiaphas, Annas, and Ensemble
- "Peter's Denial" – Maid by the Fire, Peter, Soldier, Old Man, and Mary
- "Pilate and Christ" – Pilate, Jesus, Soldier, and Ensemble
- "King Herod's Song" – Herod
- "Could We Start Again Please?" – Mary, Peter, Apostles, and Women
- "Judas' Death" – Judas, Caiaphas, Annas, and Ensemble
- "Trial Before Pilate" – Pilate, Caiaphas, Jesus, and Ensemble
- "Superstar" – Judas, Soul Sisters, and Angels
- "The Crucifixion" – Jesus and Ensemble
- "John Nineteen: Forty-One" – Orchestra

Note: In the 1992 Australian arena tour and 1994 New Zealand production, Could We Start Again Please? was moved to after Peter's Denial.

== Production ==
The songs were written and conceived as an album musical, before the musical was created and staged. On the original album, the part of Jesus was sung by Ian Gillan, with Murray Head as Judas, Michael d'Abo as King Herod, Yvonne Elliman as Mary Magdalene, and Barry Dennen as Pilate. In July 1971, the first authorised American production of the rock opera took place in front of an audience of 13,000 people at Pittsburgh, Pennsylvania's Civic Arena—staged as a concert, like an oratorio, rather than enacted, with Jeff Fenholt singing the role of Jesus, Carl Anderson as Judas and Elliman repeating as Mary Magdalene.

In August 1971, MCA Records executive David Skepner reported that MCA had been investigating and shutting down 21 unauthorised productions in the US to protect the rights of London-based Leeds Music, which owned the musical. The biggest violations Skepner found were a theatre troupe from Toronto that had crossed the US–Canada border to perform with the Detroit Symphony Orchestra, with only a few hours' prior announcement, and another big production mounted by the Las Vegas Hilton. Other American cities with unauthorised productions included Washington D.C., Boston, Kansas City, Baltimore, San Francisco, Cincinnati, Richmond, Louisville, Cleveland, St. Louis, Memphis, Atlanta, Columbus, Troy, Philadelphia, Los Angeles, New Orleans, Brooklyn in New York City, and Hollywood, Florida. Court injunctions were obtained in each of these cities to close the shows. Producer Robert Stigwood, who was assembling an authorised touring company, called these unsanctioned groups "outright pirates", stressing that he would continue to protect his rights by "relentlessly" pursuing legal action.

=== Original Broadway production ===
The musical opened on Broadway on 12 October 1971, directed by Tom O'Horgan, at the Mark Hellinger Theatre. It starred Jeff Fenholt as Jesus, Ben Vereen as Judas and Bob Bingham as Caiaphas. Dennen and Elliman played the roles that they had sung on the album. Paul Ainsley was Herod. Carl Anderson replaced Vereen when he fell ill, and the two performers later took turns playing the role. The show closed on 30 June 1973 after 711 performances. The production received mixed reviews; the bold casting of African-Americans as Judas was lauded, but reviewer Clive Barnes from The New York Times said, "the real disappointment was not in the music ... but in the conception." The show was nominated for five Tony Awards, including Best Score, but won none. Lloyd Webber won a Drama Desk Award as "Most Promising Composer", and Vereen won a Theatre World Award.

=== Controversy ===
The Broadway show and subsequent productions were condemned by different religious groups. Tim Rice was quoted as saying, "It happens that we don't see Christ as God but simply the right man at the right time at the right place." Christians considered such comments to be blasphemous, the character of Judas too sympathetic, and some of his criticisms of Jesus offensive. The musical's lack of allusion to the resurrection of Jesus has resulted in criticism similar to that of fellow musical Godspell, which also did not clearly depict a resurrection.

At the same time, some Jews claimed that it bolstered the myth of Jewish deicide by showing most of the villains as Jewish (Caiaphas and the other priests, Herod) and showing the mob in Jerusalem calling for Christ's crucifixion.

The musical was banned in South Africa for being "irreligious", and in the Hungarian People's Republic for "distribution of religious propaganda".

=== Other 1970s and 1980s productions ===
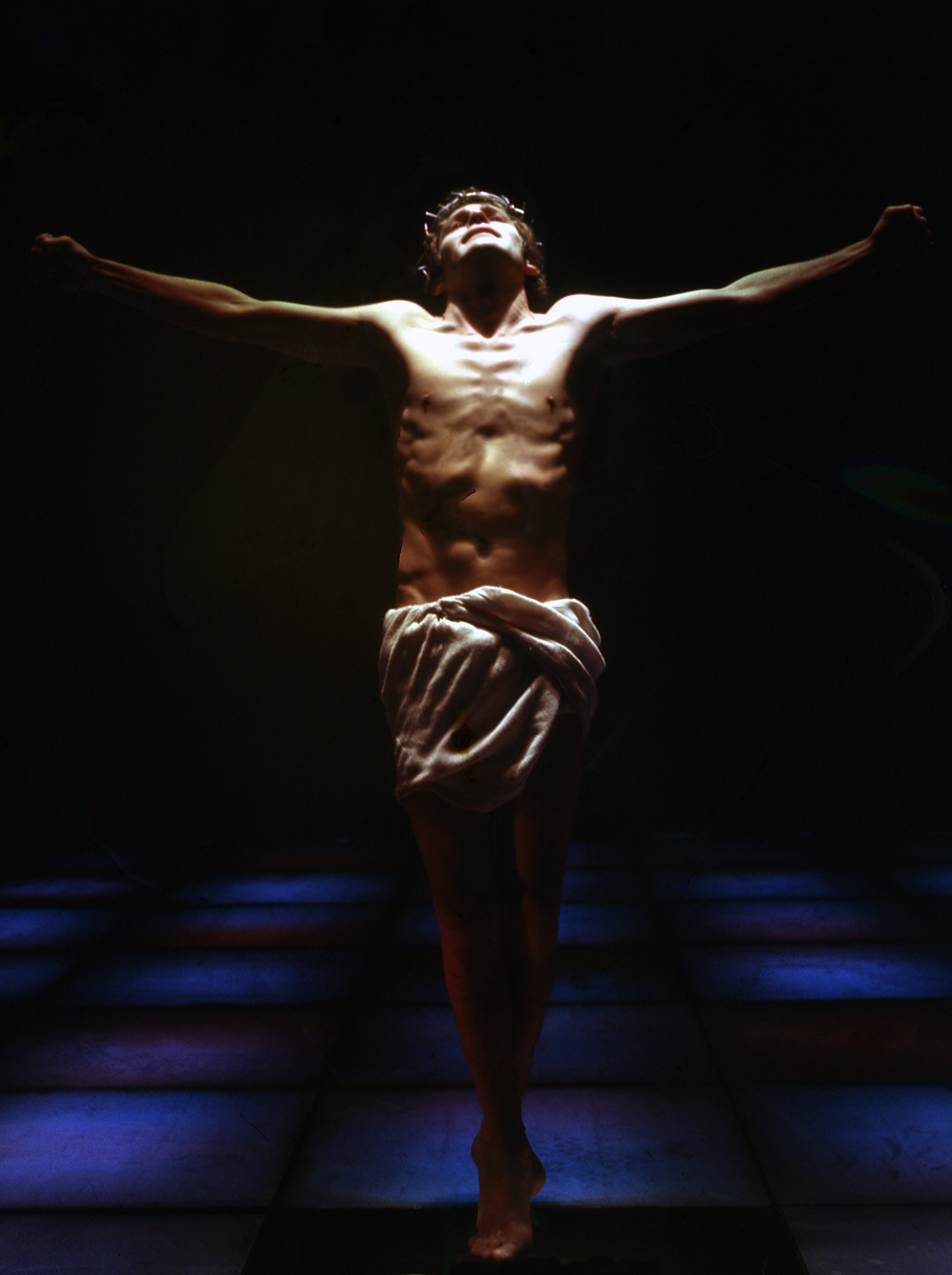
Paul Nicholas in Jesus Christ Superstar

Superstar opened at the Palace Theatre in London in 1972, starring Paul Nicholas as Jesus, Stephen Tate as Judas and Dana Gillespie as Mary Magdalene. It was directed by Australian Jim Sharman and based on his 'stripped back' production staged in Australia soon after the Broadway production opened. This version was deemed by the creators to be more efficient than the New York show, hence its use as a template for London and other subsequent productions. This production was much more successful than the original production on Broadway, running for eight years and becoming the United Kingdom's longest-running musical at the time. Dmitri Shostakovich attended this production in London just before his death. He regretted that he could not have composed something like it; he lauded especially a rock band underpinning full symphonic strings, brass, and woodwind.

One of the earliest foreign productions was a five-day run in Sweden at Scandinavium in Gothenburg, opening on 18 February 1972 and playing to 74,000 people (a record at the time). Starring as Mary Magdalene was Agnetha Fältskog, later of ABBA fame. On 16 March 1972 an oratorio version was performed at Memorial Drive Park in Adelaide, South Australia as part of the Adelaide Festival of the Arts. This was followed in May by the first official Australian production (A studio production was made in Australia earlier the same year, but it wasn't officially licensed), at the Capitol Theatre, Sydney, later moving to the Palais Theatre in Melbourne. Sharman again directed, and the cast included Trevor White as Jesus, Jon English as Judas, and Michele Fawdon (1972–1973) and Marcia Hines (1973–1974) as Mary Magdalene. Hines was the first black woman to play the role. Other cast members included Reg Livermore, John Paul Young, Stevie Wright and Rory O'Donoghue as well as Graham Russell and Russell Hitchcock who met during the production and subsequently formed the band Air Supply. The production ran until February 1974. In June 1972 the show opened in Belgrade, Yugoslavia, in Atelje 212 theatre, in adaptation by Jovan Ćirilov. The role of Jesus Christ was played by Korni Grupa vocalist Zlatko Pejaković, the role of Mary Magdalene by Azra Halinović and the role of Pontius Pilate by Branko Milićević. The premiere was directly broadcast by Radio Television of Belgrade. Bora Đorđević and Srđan Marjanović, at the time little known musicians, also participated as members of the choir. The production was praised by the Yugoslav public.

In 1973, the show opened in Paris at the Théâtre de Chaillot in a French adaptation by Pierre Delanoë. The title role was sung by Daniel Beretta, and Mary Magdalene was Anne-Marie David. The critics were unimpressed, and the production stopped after 30 performances. In the same year, Noel Pearson produced the show at the Gaiety Theatre, Dublin, Republic of Ireland, with Luke Kelly giving a critically acclaimed performance as King Herod, Colm Wilkinson as Judas and Jim McCann as Peter. In 1974, first Spanish-language production ran in Mexico with the title "Jesucristo Super Estrella". Julissa played Mary Magdalen. One year later, the musical was released for the second time in a Spanish-speaking country. It was released in Spain under the title "Jesucristo Superstar" and directed by the Spanish singer and songwriter Camilo Sesto, who also played the title role of Jesus Christ. The musical was seen in 1974 in Peru and Singapore.

Robert Stigwood launched two road touring companies in 1971 to cover North America, with Robert Corff and Tom Westerman as Jesus, respectively. The first major United States national tour, however, began in 1976, managed by Laura Shapiro Kramer. The tour continued until 1980. In 1977, the show had its first Broadway revival, running from 23 November 1977 to 12 February 1978. It was directed by William Daniel Grey, with choreography by Kelly Carrol and starred William Daniel Grey as Jesus, Patrick Jude as Judas, and Barbara Niles as Mary Magdalene. Regional productions followed.

In 1981, Emilio de Soto directed an English-language version in Venezuela, with 163 actors. From 1982 to 1984, an Australian production toured Australia and South-East Asia, directed by Trevor White, who also reprised his role of Jesus. The cast included Doug Parkinson as Judas and Marcia Hines (reprising her role as Mary Magdalene).

=== 1990s and 2000s ===
The North American touring revival of Superstar in 1992 starred Neeley and Anderson reprising their respective Broadway and 1973 film roles as Jesus and Judas, receiving positive reviews for their performances. This production also starred both Dennis DeYoung as Pilate, and Syreeta and Irene Cara sharing Mary Magdalene. Originally expected to run for three to four months, the tour ended up running for five years. Original cast replacements to this tour included Christine Rea as Mary Magdalene, Jason Raize as Pontius Pilate and Simone as the Maid by the Fire and understudy for Mary.

Also in 1992, a touring concert version was staged in Australia starring John Farnham as Jesus, Jon Stevens as Judas and Kate Ceberano as Mary. Anthony Warlow was also originally set to star as Pilate but he had to leave the production due to his Non-Hodgkin lymphoma diagnosis, though he was replaced by John Waters. This production broke box office records and produced a number 1 soundtrack album. In 1994, a New Zealand production starred Darryl Lovegrove as Jesus, Jay Laga'aia, Catherine Laga'aia's father, as Judas and Frankie Stevens as Caiaphas. Also in 1994, a stage version titled Jesus Christ Superstar: A Resurrection was performed in Atlanta, Austin and Seattle featuring Amy Ray and Emily Saliers of the Indigo Girls as Jesus and Mary Magdalene respectively, and Michael Lorant as Judas.

In 1996, the musical was revived in London at the Lyceum Theatre and ran for a year and a half. Directed by Gale Edwards, it starred Steve Balsamo and Zubin Varla as Jesus and Judas, and Joanna Ampil as Mary Magdalene. Alice Cooper sang the role of King Herod on the cast recording but did not play the role on stage. The production was nominated for an Olivier Award for Best Musical Revival but did not win. It was followed by a UK tour. This production was revived on Broadway at the Ford Center for the Performing Arts in 2000, starring Glenn Carter as Jesus and Tony Vincent as Judas. It opened to mixed reviews and ran for 161 performances. It was nominated for a Tony Award for Best Revival of a Musical but did not win. In 2002, a national tour starred Sebastian Bach as Jesus and Carl Anderson once again as Judas. Bach received mixed reviews while Anderson was again praised. In April 2003, Bach was replaced by Eric Kunze. Anderson left the show later in 2003 after being diagnosed with leukaemia and died in 2004. The tour closed shortly after Anderson's departure.

In 2004, a year-long UK tour began, directed by Bob Tomson and Bill Kenwright. Carter reprised his role as Jesus, with James Fox as Judas. In December 2004, a successful Scandinavian tour starred Peter Murphy as Jesus, Kristen Cummings as Mary Magdalene, Jon Boydon née Stokes as Judas, Jérôme Pradon as King Herod and Michael-John Hurney as Pilate. A US tour starring Neeley, reprising his role as Jesus, Corey Glover as Judas, and Christine Rea as Mary, began in 2006 and played for five years. A Chilean heavy metal version has played annually in Santiago since 2004. In Boston, Gary Cherone portrayed Jesus in productions in 1994, 1996 and 2003 and Judas in 2000.

=== 2010s and 2020s ===
A new production of Jesus Christ Superstar was mounted at the Stratford Shakespeare Festival, in Stratford, Ontario, in 2011. Directed by Des McAnuff, the cast starred Paul Nolan as Jesus, Josh Young as Judas, Brent Carver as Pilate, Chilina Kennedy as Mary Magdalene, Bruce Dow as Herod and Melissa O'Neil as Martha. This moved to La Jolla Playhouse later in the year and transferred to the Neil Simon Theatre on Broadway in 2012, with Tom Hewitt taking over the role of Pilate. Reviews were mixed. The revival was nominated for two Tonys: Best Revival and, for Young, Best Actor. Neither award was won, but Young won a Theatre World Award. The revival closed after 116 performances and 24 previews.

Through a 2012 ITV competition TV show called Superstar, produced by Andrew Lloyd Webber, the UK public chose Ben Forster for the role of Jesus in an arena tour of the musical, beginning at O2 in September 2012. The production also starred Tim Minchin as Judas, Melanie C as Mary Magdalene and Chris Moyles as King Herod. Lloyd Webber stated, "The funny thing is that Jesus Christ Superstar [as a rock concert] is what we actually intended it to be. When it is done in a conventional proscenium theatre production, it feels shoe-horned in. That is why I wanted to do this." The tour resumed in March 2013 in the UK, and an Australian leg of the tour commenced in Perth in May 2013. Andrew O'Keefe played King Herod in Australia, with Jon Stevens, who had played Judas in the 1992 Australian arena tour, as Pilate.

In 2016, celebrating 45 years since the musical debuted on Broadway, Jesus Christ Superstar returned to London at Regent's Park Open Air Theatre from 15 July to 27 August, directed by Timothy Sheader. The production won the BBC Radio 2 Audience Award for Best Musical at the Evening Standard Theatre Awards, and a Laurence Olivier Award for Best Musical Revival. The production returned as part of the 2017 season, running from 11 August 2017 to 23 September. The Lyric Opera of Chicago hosted a run from late April 2018 to late May 2018. before returning to London at the Barbican Centre from 9 July to 24 August 2019, prior to a 50th anniversary US tour from October 2019. However, due to the COVID-19 pandemic, the US tour was temporarily suspended in March 2020. The production returned to Regent's Park Open Air Theatre in a socially distanced environment in a concert staging from 14 August to 27 September 2020. The US tour resumed performances on 28 September 2021 at the Keller Auditorium. On 23 November 2021, James D. Beeks, who played Judas in the tour, was arrested for involvement in the 2021 United States Capitol attack. Beeks, performing in the show under the stage name James T. Justis, is alleged to have been one of those who forced entry into the Capitol and to have paid dues to the far right-wing anti-government militia Oath Keepers. Beeks was immediately suspended from the touring production with the role of Judas assumed by another performer in the cast. On 2 December 2021, Tyrone Huntley, who played Judas in the 2016 London production, and later Simon, in Hollywood, was announced to have replaced Beeks. A UK tour began at the Palace Theatre, Manchester from September 2023 featuring comedian Julian Clary as Herod.

In 2017, a production featuring an all-Black cast was directed by Ron Kellum at the Paramount Theatre in Aurora, IL. Kellum's production ran from 19 April 2017 through 28 May 2017.

A new actor-musician revival was performed at the Watermill Theatre, Newbury from 24 June until 21 September 2025, directed by Paul Hart.

In August 2025, a production of the show was presented at the Hollywood Bowl starring Cynthia Erivo as Jesus, Adam Lambert as Judas, Phillipa Soo as Mary, Raul Esparza as Pilate, Josh Gad as Herod, Zachary James as Caiaphas, Milo Manheim as Peter, Tyrone Huntley as Simon, and Brian Justin Crum as Annas. Two days before opening, Gad tested positive for COVID-19 and the role of Herod was covered by John Stamos the following day for one of the three performances.

In October 2025, it was announced that an international tour of the Regent's Park Open Air Theatre production would begin in Manila, Philippines, at the Theatre at Solaire from May 2026, with additional stops in Taipei, Taiwan at the National Theatre, Hong Kong at the Hong Kong Cultural Centre and Singapore at the Sands Theatre announced thus far.

On 7 November 2025, it was announced that the Regent's Park Open Air Theatre production will be staged at The London Palladium, running for a limited 11-week season from 20 June to 5 September 2026. Sam Ryder stars as Jesus. Jesse Tyler Ferguson, Layton Williams, Richard Armitage, and Julian Clary alternated in the role of King Herod. Boy George was also due to play King Herod, but withdrew from the production, causing Armitage to extend his performances. In March 2026, Tyrone Huntley joined the cast as Judas with Desmonda Cathabel as Mary and David Thaxton as Pilate. It is directed by Tim Sheader. The production featured on-stage standing for some members of the audience. The revival received positive reviews from critics, with Sam Ryder's performance praised in particular.

Due to popular demand at the London Palladium, the production transferred to the Theatre Royal, Drury Lane for a limited 12-week season from October 16 2026 to January 9 2027, with Ryder reprising his role of Jesus. Cathabel and Thaxton were also confirmed to reprise their respective roles. Simon Russell Beale (who was originally announced to appear in the role at the Palladium) will play King Herod from 7 to 12 December. Michael Ball, Bob the Drag Queen, Matt Bomer, Rob Brydon, Reece Shearsmith, Omid Djalili, and Glenn Close will also portray Herod during the run. Williams is set to reprise the role from the Palladium for a week during the holiday season.

Following the Palladium and Drury Lane runs, the production will tour the UK beginning at the Palace Theatre, Manchester from 11 February 2027, with Ryder reprising the role of Jesus.

=== Notable international productions ===
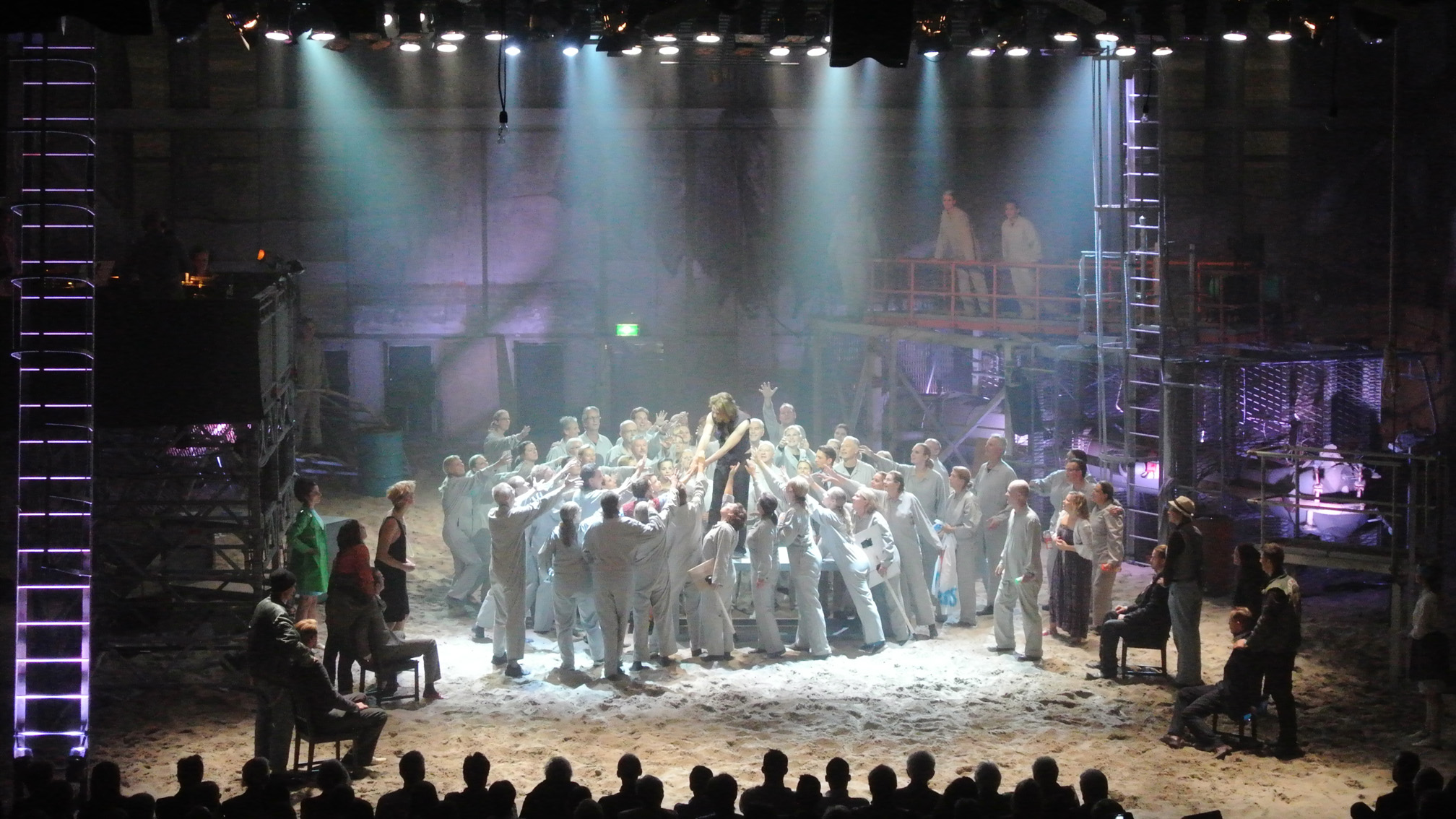
2013 production in Rotterdam, Netherlands

Two notable Jesuses were Takeshi Kaga, in the 1976 Japanese production, and Camilo Sesto in the 1975 Spanish production. Mary Magdalene was played by Rocío Banquells in a 1981 production in Mexico.

An Australian arena tour launched in 1992, with an all-star line-up. Headline stars John Farnham (Jesus), Jon Stevens (Judas) and Kate Ceberano (Mary) lead this star-studded cast, including John Waters (Pilate) and Angry Anderson (Herod).

A Czech version premiered in 1994 in Prague's Spirála Theatre and ran until 1998, with 1288 performances. In the 2000s, a Venezuelan production ran for two years (2006–2008), directed by Michel Hausmann. A Spanish production produced by Stage Entertainment ran from 2007 to 2009, followed by long-running productions in Italy and Sweden (featuring Ola Salo) and Norway.

Concerts of the show have been mounted in Vienna, Austria, since 1981, including one on Easter of 2015 starring Drew Sarich in the title role.

A 2014 production in São Paulo, Brazil starred Igor Rickli as Jesus. Negra Li was Mary Magdalene. A 2014 production in Lima, Peru, at the Sarita Colonia prison, as part of a rehabilitation program for inmates, received some press. Eighty prisoners mounted the production, directed by inmate Freddy Battifora, who also played the role of Jesus. The Catholic Church approved of the production.

In 2018, a new production, directed by Michael Hunt was premiered at the Perm Academic Theatre, Russia. Hunt worked closely with The Really Useful Group on a new translation together with the concept for a new staging. This rock opera is very popular in Russia but is the first authorised production to receive the support of the Really Useful Group.

A Mexican production featuring an all-star rock and pop cast was produced in 2019 with the title role of Jesus being played by Chilean rock musician Beto Cuevas. It was so successful it would run again in 2021 and 2024.

== Recordings and radio broadcasts ==
The original 1970 concept album was very popular; its 1971 release topped the US Billboard Pop Albums. The 1972 and 1992 Australian cast recordings were also both highly successful.

In 1994, a studio recording under the name of Jesus Christ Superstar: A Resurrection was released. Another studio album was released that year with Dave Willetts as Jesus, Clive Rowe as Judas, Ethan Freeman as Pilate, Clive Carter as Peter, Issy van Randwyck as Mary, Billy Hartman as Caiaphas, and Christopher Biggins as Herod.

A 1996 radio production for BBC Radio 2 starred Tony Hadley as Jesus, Roger Daltrey as Judas, Frances Ruffelle as Mary Magdalene and Julian Clary as King Herod; this production was re-broadcast on BBC Radio 4 Extra on 6 August 2016.

A 2005 remastered version includes Steve Balsamo as Jesus. Balsamo portrayed Jesus in London's West End from November 1996 to September 1997.

In May 2018, Aztec Records released a 1973 live recording of the Australian production; previous recordings of that production were released as "bootleg" copies.

As part of the 2026 West End production, Sam Ryder recorded "Gethsemane" and "What's The Buzz" live to tape at British Grove Studios.

== Adaptations ==
=== Films ===
A film adaptation of Jesus Christ Superstar was released in 1973. The film, directed by Norman Jewison, was shot in Israel and other Middle Eastern locations. Ted Neeley, Carl Anderson, and Yvonne Elliman were each nominated for a Golden Globe Award for their portrayals of Jesus, Judas and Mary Magdalene, respectively. Bob Bingham (Caiaphas) and Barry Dennen (Pilate) also reprised their roles. A new song, called "Then We Are Decided" and phrased as a dialogue between Caiaphas and Annas, was written for this adaptation.

A second adaptation was filmed in 1999 and released around the world on video in 2000 and 2001. It starred Glenn Carter as Jesus, Jérôme Pradon as Judas, Reneé Castle as Mary Magdalene, and Rik Mayall as Herod, and was directed by Gale Edwards and Nick Morris. It was released on video in the UK in October 2000. In the U.S., it was released on VHS and DVD in March 2001, and aired on PBS's Great Performances series in April 2001. It won the International Emmy Award for Best Performing Arts Film in November 2001. The style of the film is more like the stage version than the location-based 1973 adaptation, and it used many of the ideas from the 1996–1999 UK production.

=== Live recordings ===
The 2012 UK arena tour was filmed over two nights at the National Indoor Arena in Birmingham, England, and released on DVD and Blu-ray. For this production, both costume and set design were reimagined within a contemporary setting. The cast featured Ben Forster as Jesus, Tim Minchin as Judas, Melanie C as Mary Magdalene, and Chris Moyles as King Herod. Lloyd Webber stated, "The funny thing is that Jesus Christ Superstar [as a rock concert] is what we actually intended it to be. When it is done in a conventional proscenium theatre production it feels shoe-horned in. That is why I wanted to do this."

=== Television ===
On Easter Sunday, 1 April 2018, NBC aired a staged live concert version of the show featuring John Legend as Jesus, Sara Bareilles as Mary Magdalene, Brandon Victor Dixon as Judas, Alice Cooper as King Herod, Norm Lewis as Caiaphas, Ben Daniels as Pilate, Jin Ha as Annas, Erik Grönwall as Simon Zealotes and Jason Tam as Peter.

== Casting history ==
Character	Concept album	Broadway	West End	Film	Broadway revival	West End revival	Broadway revival	Film	Broadway revival	UK arena tour	NBC live concert	West End revival
Character	1970	1971	1972	1973	1977	1996	2000		2012		2018	2026
Jesus Christ	Ian Gillan	Jeff Fenholt	Paul Nicholas	Ted Neeley	William Daniel Grey	Steve Balsamo	Glenn Carter	Glenn Carter	Paul Alexander Nolan	Ben Forster	John Legend	Sam Ryder
Judas Iscariot	Murray Head	Ben Vereen	Stephen Tate	Carl Anderson	Patrick Jude	Zubin Varla	Tony Vincent	Jérôme Pradon	Josh Young	Tim Minchin	Brandon Victor Dixon	Tyrone Huntley
Mary Magdalene	Yvonne Elliman	Yvonne Elliman	Dana Gillespie	Yvonne Elliman	Barbara Niles	Joanna Ampil	Maya Days	Renée Castle	Chilina Kennedy	Melanie C	Sara Bareilles	Desmonda Cathabel
Pontius Pilate	Barry Dennen	Barry Dennen	John Parker	Barry Dennen	Randy Wilson	David Burt	Kevin Gray	Fred Johanson	Tom Hewitt	Alexander Hanson	Ben Daniels	David Thaxton
Caiaphas	Victor Brox	Bob Bingham	George Harris	Bob Bingham	Christopher Cable	Pete Gallagher	Frederick Owens	Frederick Owens	Marcus Nance	Pete Gallagher	Norm Lewis	Bob Harms
Annas	Brian Keith	Phil Jethro	Jimmy Cassidy	Kurt Yaghjian	Steve Schochet	Martin Callaghan	Ray Walker	Michael Shaeffer	Aaron Walpole	Gerard Bentall	Jin Ha	Matty J
Peter	Paul Davis	Michael Jason	Richard Barnes	Paul Thomas	Randy Martin	Paul Hawkyard	Rodney Hicks	Cavin Cornwall	Mike Nadajewski	Michael Pickering	Jason Tam	Phil King
Simon Zealotes	John Gustafson	Dennis Buckley	Derek James	Larry Marshall	Bobby London	Glenn Carter	Michael K. Lee	Tony Vincent	Lee Siegel	Giovanni Spano	Erik Grönwall	Billy Nevers
King Herod	Mike d'Abo	Paul Ainsley	Paul Jabara	Josh Mostel	Mark Syers	Nick Holder	Paul Kandel	Rik Mayall	Bruce Dow	Chris Moyles	Alice Cooper	Jesse Tyler Ferguson

=== Notable replacements ===
==== West End (2026-2027) ====
- King Herod: Richard Armitage, Layton Williams, Julian Clary, Matt Bomer, Rob Brydon, Reece Shearsmith, Bob the Drag Queen, Michael Ball, Simon Russell Beale, Omid Djalili, Glenn Close

== Awards and nominations ==
=== Original Broadway production ===
Year	Award ceremony	Category	Nominee	Result
1972	Tony Award	Best Performance by a Featured Actor in a Musical	Ben Vereen	Nominated
1972	Tony Award	Best Original Score	Andrew Lloyd Webber and Tim Rice	Nominated
1972	Tony Award	Best Scenic Design	Robin Wagner	Nominated
1972	Tony Award	Best Costume Design	Randy Barceló	Nominated
1972	Tony Award	Best Lighting Design	Jules Fisher	Nominated
1972	Drama Desk Award	Most Promising Composer	Andrew Lloyd Webber	Won
1972	Theatre World Award		Ben Vereen	Won

=== 1996 West End revival ===
Year	Award ceremony	Category	Nominee	Result
1997	Laurence Olivier Award	Best Musical Revival		Nominated

=== 2000 Broadway revival ===
Year	Award ceremony	Category	Nominee	Result
2000	Tony Award	Best Revival of a Musical		Nominated

=== 2012 Broadway revival ===
Year	Award ceremony	Category	Nominee	Result
2012	Tony Award	Best Revival of a Musical		Nominated
2012	Tony Award	Best Performance by a Featured Actor in a Musical	Josh Young	Nominated
2012	Drama Desk Award	Outstanding Revival of a Musical		Nominated
2012	Drama Desk Award	Outstanding Sound Design	Steve Canyon Kennedy	Nominated
2012	Theatre World Award		Josh Young	Won

=== 2016 Regent's Park Open Air Theatre revival ===
Year	Award ceremony	Category	Nominee	Result
2016	Evening Standard Theatre Award	Best Musical		Won
2016	Evening Standard Theatre Award	Emerging Talent	Tyrone Huntley	Won
2017	Laurence Olivier Award	Best Musical Revival		Won
2017	Laurence Olivier Award	Best Actor in a Musical	Tyrone Huntley	Nominated
2017	Laurence Olivier Award	Best Theatre Choreographer	Drew McOnie	Nominated
2017	Laurence Olivier Award	Best Lighting Design	Lee Curran	Nominated
2017	Laurence Olivier Award	Best Sound Design	Nick Lidster for Autograph	Nominated
2017	Laurence Olivier Award	Outstanding Achievement in Music	The band and company	Nominated
