= Frank Peterson =

German music producer (born 1963)

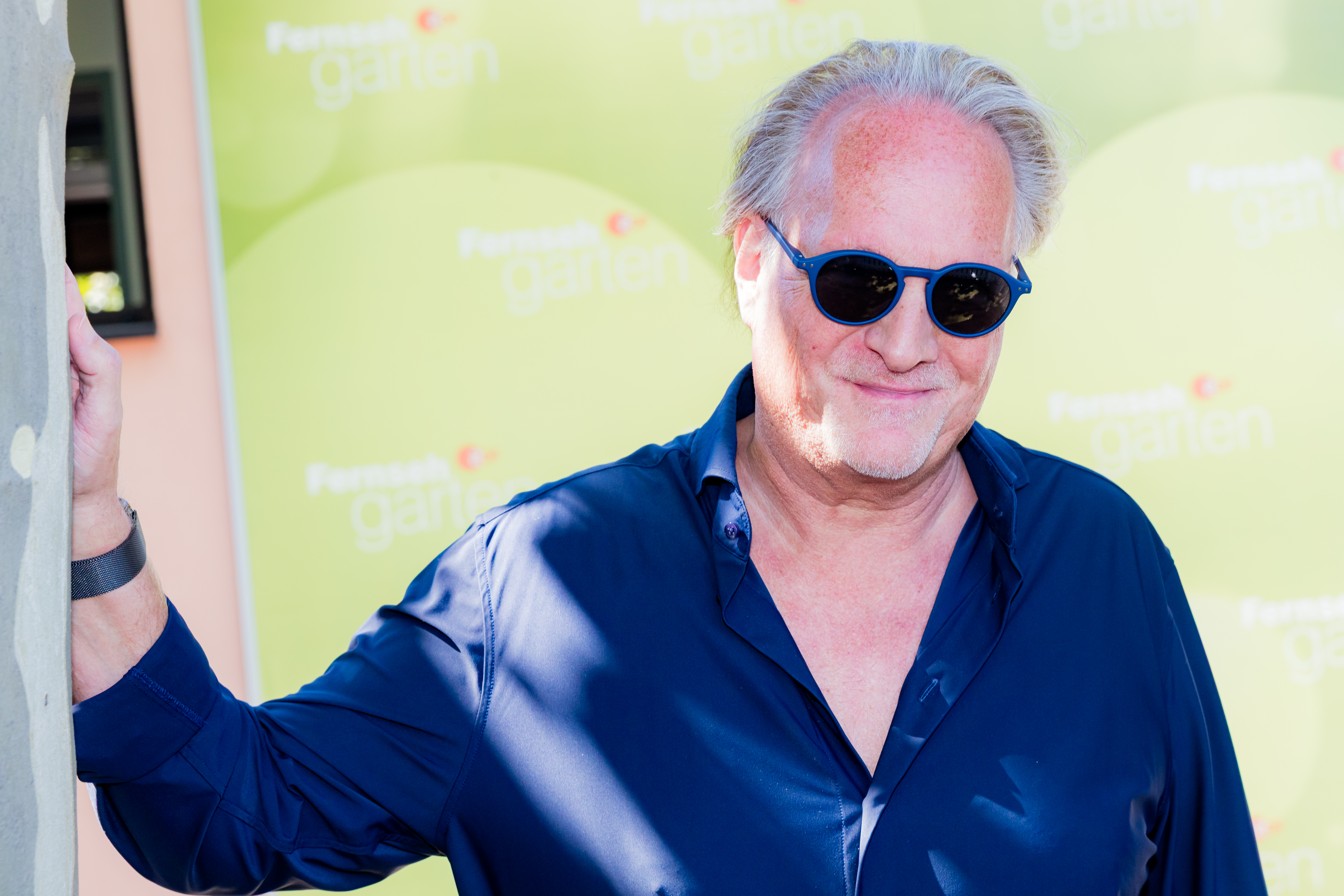
- Peterson in 2025

Background information
- Born: 20 December 1963 (age 61); Hamburg, Germany
- Occupation: Music producer
- Instruments: Piano; guitar; synthesizer
- Member of: Gregorian
- Formerly of: Enigma

Frank Peterson (born 20 December 1963) is a German music producer known for his work with Enigma and Gregorian as well as artists such as Sarah Brightman, Ofra Haza, and Andrea Bocelli.

== Life and career ==
Peterson was born in Hamburg, Germany. As a child, he learned to play the piano, synthesizer, and guitar, going on to work in a music store. It was here that he met Michael Cretu and became lead keyboardist for Sandra, appearing on her 1985 hit single "(I'll Never Be) Maria Magdalena". In 1988, after Cretu married Sandra and the couple moved to Ibiza, Peterson joined them. He became a member of Cretu's new-age project Enigma, under the moniker "F. Gregorian", and contributed to the group's 1990 debut album, MCMXC a.D.

Peterson left Enigma in 1991 and returned to Hamburg to pursue other projects. He formed the group Gregorian with keyboardists Thomas Schwarz and Matthias Meissner, and they released the pop album Sadisfaction the same year, with Birgit Freud and Susana Espelleta (who was then married to Peterson) providing vocals as "the Sisters of Oz". Peterson subsequently put the project on hold and went on to work with English soprano Sarah Brightman, producing and contributing instrumentation to her albums Dive (1993), Fly (1995), Timeless (1997), Eden (1998), La Luna (2000), Harem (2003), Symphony (2008), A Winter Symphony (2008), and Hymn (2018). In 1995, he produced the song "Time to Say Goodbye" for the Italian tenor Andrea Bocelli, and in 1997, he produced the eponymously titled final studio album by Israeli singer Ofra Haza.

In 1998, Peterson resurrected Gregorian as a group performing Gregorian chant arrangements of popular songs, moving away from its original pop style. His inspiration, as he stated in an interview, was the approaching new millennium and its spiritual aspect.

In 2008, he produced the studio album Drama by the German musical actress and singer Carolin Fortenbacher.

Peterson runs his own recording studio, called Nemo-Studios.

=== Lawsuit against Google/YouTube ===
On 16 April 2009, Billboard magazine reported that Peterson had filed a lawsuit at the Higher District Court in Hamburg against Google/YouTube, claiming that his music videos and other audiovisual repertoire were used illegally. In his lawsuit, Peterson claimed infringement of his copyrights and master rights. He stated that more than 125 million streams of his productions—for which he owns the copyrights and master rights as author, publisher, and producer—had been viewed, for which he never received payment from Google/YouTube.

== Discography ==
=== Gregorian ===
- Sadisfaction (1991)
- Masters of Chant (1999)
- Masters of Chant Chapter II (2001)
- Masters of Chant Chapter III (2002)
- Masters of Chant Chapter IV (2003)
- The Dark Side (2004)
- Masters of Chant Chapter V (2006)
- Masters of Chant Chapter VI (2007)
- Masters of Chant Chapter VII
- Dark Side of the Chant (2009)
- Masters of Chant Chapter VIII (2011)
- Epic Chants (2012)
- Masters of Chant Chapter IX (2013)
- Winter Chants (2014)
- Masters of Chant X: The Final Chapter (2015)
- Holy Chants (2017)
- Pure Chants (2021)
- Pure Chants II (2022)

=== As producer ===
Sarah Brightman

- Dive (1993)
- Fly (1995)
- Timeless (1997)
- Eden (1998)
- La Luna (2000)
- Harem (2003)
- Symphony (2008)
- A Winter Symphony (2008)
- Hymn (2018)

Other artists

- Ofra Haza – Ofra Haza (1997)
- Carolin Fortenbacher – Drama (2008)
