= Dive (Sarah Brightman album) =

Studio album by Sarah Brightman
- Released: US: 20 April 1993
- Recorded: 1993
- Studios: Nemo Studio (Hamburg, Germany); Metropolis Studios (London, England); Fairlight Studio (Madrid, Spain); Sedic Studios (Tokyo, Japan)
- Genre: Pop
- Length: 51:36
- Label: A&M
- Producer: Frank Peterson

Sarah Brightman chronology
Sarah Brightman Sings the Music of Andrew Lloyd Webber (1992)	Dive (1993)	Fly (1995)

Singles from Dive
- 1. "Captain Nemo" Released: 1993; 2. "The Second Element" Released: 1993

Professional ratings
Review scores
Source	Rating
AllMusic	3/5 stars

Dive is the third studio album by English soprano Sarah Brightman. It is her first album with producer Frank Peterson, and a marked departure from her previous operatic works. Its unifying theme is water and the ocean. Four of the songs are covers: "Captain Nemo" was recorded in 1990 by Dive; "A Salty Dog" in 1969 by Procol Harum; and "Johnny Wanna Live" in 1992 by Sandra. Likewise, "Once in a Lifetime" is a cover of the Gregorian song from 1991's Sadisfaction, also produced by Frank Peterson, though with different lyrics alluding to BDSM.

== Track listing ==
No.	Title	Writer(s)	Length
1.	"Dive"	Frank Peterson, Heathcote Williams	0:53
2.	"Captain Nemo"	Erik Holmberg, Chris Lancelot	5:17
3.	"The Second Element"	Thomas Schwarz, Peterson, Mathias Meissner, Weiss	4:15
4.	"Ship of Fools"	Peterson/Jane Andrews	2:24
5.	"Once in a Lifetime"	Peterson, Schwarz, Meissner, Sarah Brightman	4:21
6.	"Cape Horn"	Peterson, Wehr	0:50
7.	"Salty Dog"	Gary Brooker, Keith Reid	3:49
8.	"Siren"	Peterson	1:15
9.	"Seven Seas"	Peterson, Andrews	4:10
10.	"Johnny Wanna Live"	Peterson, Michael Cretu, Hirschburger	4:40
11.	"By Now"	Schwarz, Meissner, Peterson, Brightman	3:23
12.	"Island"	Peterson, Andrews	4:22
13.	"When It Rains in America"	Schwarz, Meissner, Peterson, Brightman	3:43
14.	"La Mer"	Peterson, Brightman	3:34
15.	"The Second Element II"	Peterson, Schwarz, Meissner, Pirs	4:48
Total length:			51:36

== Singles ==
- "Captain Nemo" (1993)
- "The Second Element" (1993)

== Personnel ==
- A.L.W. – background vocals
- Sarah Brightman – keyboards, vocals, background vocals, producer
- Dave Collins – mastering
- Udo Dahmen – percussion, drums
- Simon Fowler – photography
- Matt Howe – engineer, overdub engineer
- Ben Huellenkremer – bass
- Gunther Laudahn – guitar, background vocals
- Tom Leonhardt – guitar
- Russell Powell – guitar
- The London Community Gospel Choir – background vocals
- Matthias Meissner – arranger, keyboards
- Frank Peterson – percussion, arranger, drums, keyboards, background vocals, producer, engineer, mixing
- Thomas Schwarz – guitar, arranger, background vocals
- Stylorouge – art direction, design
- Michael Wehr – arranger, keyboards, background vocals, producer, engineer, mixing, digital engineer, audio frame systems operator, digital system operator
- Peter Weihe – guitar
- Koba Yashi – engineer, overdub engineer

== Chart ==
Region	Certification	Certified units/sales
Canada (Music Canada)	Gold	50,000^{^}
^{^} Shipments figures based on certification alone.
