= Best of 1990–2010 =

Compilation album by Gregorian
- Released: (Germany) 28 January 2011
- Genre: Gregorian chant
- Label: EDEL Distribution GmbH

Best of 1990–2010 is a best of album by the German band Gregorian headed by Frank Peterson.

== Track listing ==
1. "So Sad"
2. "Nothing Else Matters"
3. "Moment of Peace"
4. "Voyage, Voyage"
5. "Hymn"
6. "Join Me"
7. "The Raven"
8. "Angels"
9. "The Forest"
10. "Fix You"
11. "One"
12. "Happy Xmas (War Is Over)"
13. "Sadeness (Part I)" *
14. "Forever Young" *
15. "Missing" *
16. "Let Down" *
17. "Sinners And Saints" *
18. "Crazy Crazy Nights" *

* Previously unreleased and rare songs from the Gregorian archives

== Certifications ==
Region	Certification	Certified units/sales
Germany (BVMI)	Gold	100,000^{‡}
^{‡} Sales+streaming figures based on certification alone.
