= Carolin Fortenbacher =

German musical actress and singer (born 1963)

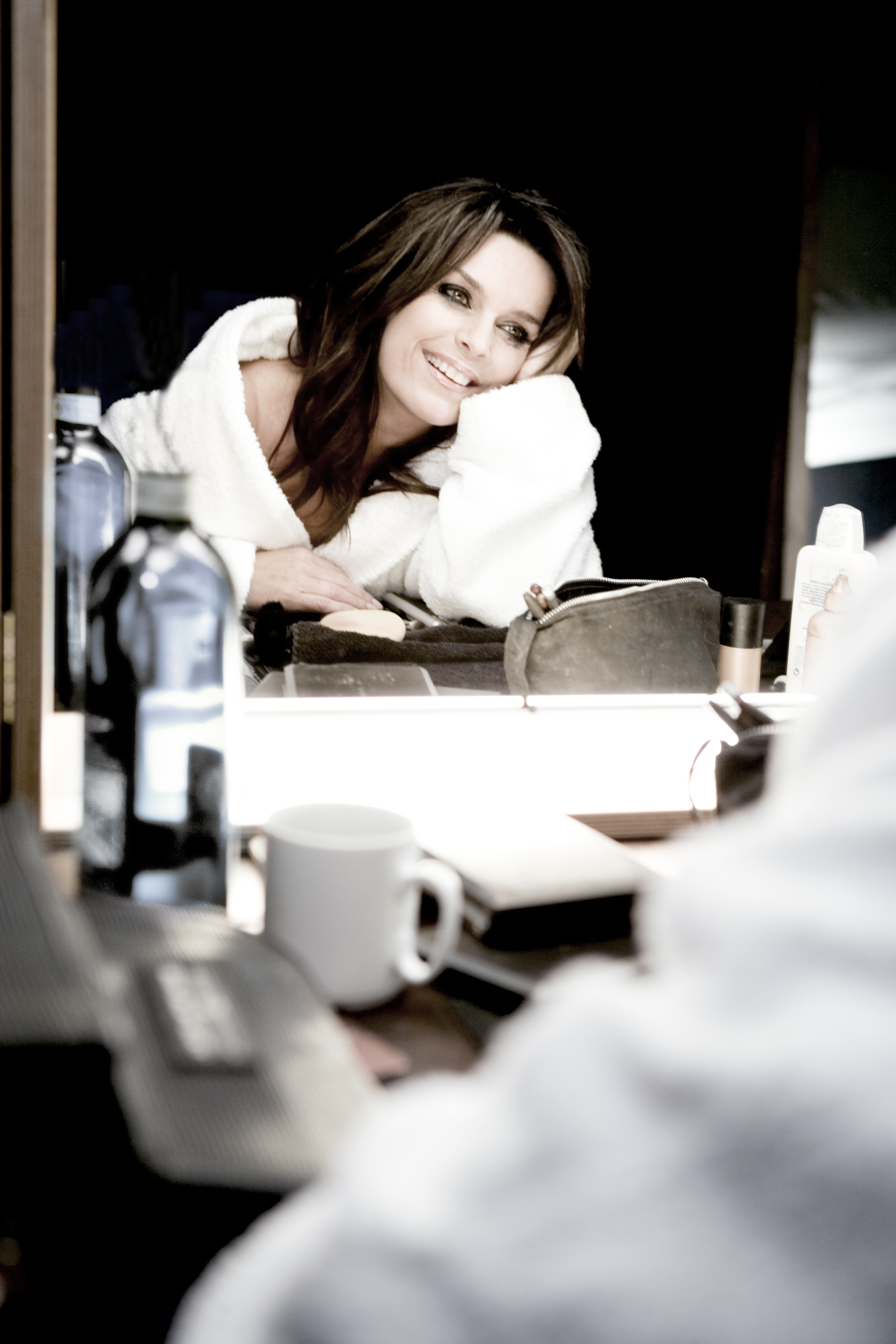

Background information
- Born: 26 June 1963 (age 63); Hamburg, West Germany
- Genres: Musical theatre, pop
- Occupations: Actress, singer
- Years active: 1990s–present
- Label: Warner Music
- Website: www.carolin-fortenbacher.de

Carolin Fortenbacher (born 26 June 1963 in Hamburg) is a German musical actress and singer. She has had a leading role for five years in the musical Mamma Mia! in Hamburg.

== Career ==
=== Training ===
Fortenbacher began training as a make-up and cosmetic artist, before her introduction to ballet and musical training with Monika Radler at the Volker Ullmann Studio, and then the Stage School of Dance and Drama. Additionally, her voice was trained by Liliana Aabye.

=== Musical theatre ===
Fortenbacher's different musical styles include soul, jazz, pop and rock, and also opera. Audiences know her both for her musical roles and for classical parts. In the Hamburg performance of The Magic Flute, she played the Queen of the Night. Musical commitments followed such as Rosalina in West Side Story, Lucy in the musical Charlie Brown, Audrey in the Little Shop of Horrors or Anne in La Cage aux Folles. She took part in the Rock Opera Jimmy Dean at the Theater Casa Nova in Essen. She took on the roles of Mabel and Kate in the musical The Pirates of Penzance.

In September 1994, she played Aldonza in Der Mann von La Mancha, and she received the Image Award Germany.

She won the Publikumspreis des Theater des Westens, Berlin. There she had a commitment in Zustände wie im alten Rom.

In Oberhausen, she played the role of the spider in the musical Tabaluga & Lilli. From November 2002 until September 2007, Fortenbacher starred as Donna in the musical Mamma Mia! at the Operettenhaus Hamburg.

For this she was selected by the readers of the Bildzeitung as second place in the Top Women of Hamburg 2005, behind Hannelore Schmidt.

=== Television roles and Zurück zu mir ===
Apart from her stage roles, Fortenbacher also had two solo programs Charade and the James Bond parody, 0014 Jane Blond. In September 2005, she released her first solo album, Zurück zu mir.

Fortenbacher was in some television productions, such as Divorce Court on RTL and as singer/dancer in Showmaster, and had numerous musical appearances. At the beginning of 2006, she toured with the musical act Best of Musical in Germany and Austria.

==== Drama and Eurovision attempt ====
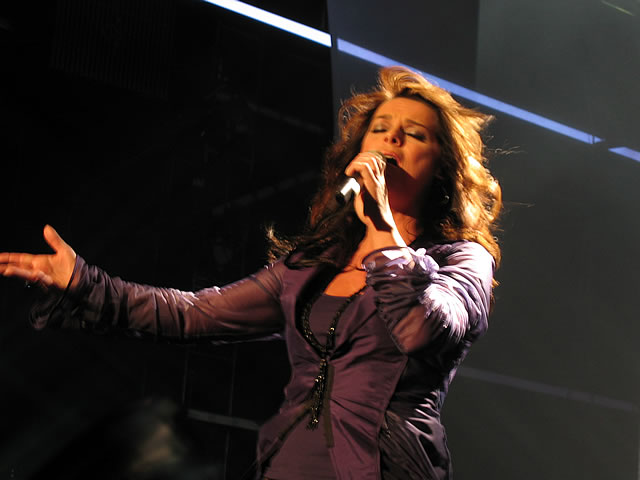
Carolin Fortenbacher at the Grand Prix Vorentscheid 2008

On 6 March 2008, the song "Hinterm Ozean" (en: "Beyond the Ocean") was one of five competing entries in the Grand Prix Vorentscheid 2008, in which the winning song would become the German entry for the Eurovision Song Contest 2008. She passed the first 4 rounds, beating Marquess, Cinema Bizarre and Tommy Reeve, however in the final selection she lost to No Angels with "Disappear", taking second place with 49.5% of the votes.

The single "Hinterm Ozean" was released on 29 February 2008. The album Drama followed on 7 March 2008. Drama was produced by Frank Peterson at his Nemo Studio, and mainly contained German-language covers of popular songs such as "One Day I'll Fly Away" ("Ich nehm' den weiten Weg"). "Hinterm Ozean" charted at number 44 on the German charts, and Drama charted at number 50.

In December 2008, she toured with Gregorian (another Frank Peterson project) in Germany on their Christmas Chants tour and took over the role of Amelia Brightman. Fortenbacher also performed vocals for "Last Christmas" on Gregorian's Christmas Chants and Visions.

== Personal life ==
Fortenbacher was married for nine years to dancer Piotr Poplawski, and the couple have a daughter.

== Theatre roles (selection) ==
- 1993: The Legend of Jimmy Dean (Pier Angeli – Essen)
- 1994: Pirate (Dortmund)
- 1994/1995: Der Mann von La Mancha (Aldonza – Essen)
- 1996: The Pirates of Penzance (Mabel – Berlin)
- 1997: Zustände wie im alten Rom (Berlin)
- 1999/2000: Tabaluga and Lilli (Spinne – Oberhausen)
- 2000: Evita (Evita – Tecklenburg)
- 2001: Jesus Christ Superstar (Maria Magdalena – Tecklenburg)
- 2002–2007: Mamma Mia! (Donna – Hamburg)

== Discography ==
=== Cast albums ===
- Der Mann von La Mancha
- Die Legende von Jimmy Dean
- Voice of Eternity
- Being alive - The Art of German Musicalstars
- Hero Nation
- Mamma Mia!
- Best of Musical
- Christmas Stories

=== Solo albums ===
- Zurück zu mir (2005)
- Drama (2008)
- Kamionka (2014)

=== Solo singles ===
- "Mozarts Königin der Nacht in Rock" (2004)
- "Hinterm Ozean" (2008)
