= Hinterm Ozean =

Single by Carolin Fortenbacher

from the album Drama
- Released: 29 February 2008
- Recorded: Nemo Studio
- Label: Warner Music Group
- Producer: Frank Peterson

Carolin Fortenbacher singles chronology
"Mozart's Königin der Nacht in Rock" (2004)	"Hinterm Ozean" (2008)

"Hinterm Ozean" (en: "Far Beyond the Sea") is a pop song released by German singer and actress Carolin Fortenbacher in 2008. The song was featured on Fortenbacher's second solo album Drama.

"Hinterm Ozean" was released on 29 February 2008, and was produced by Frank Peterson at his Nemo Studio. The song charted at number 44 on the German singles chart.

== Eurovision attempt ==
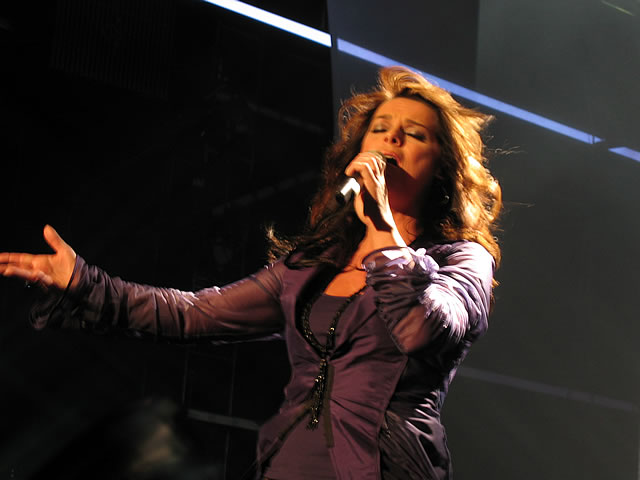
Carolin Fortenbacher at the Grand Prix Vorentscheid 2008

On 6 March 2008, "Hinterm Ozean" was one of five competing entries in the Grand Prix Vorentscheid 2008, in which the winning song would become the German entry for the Eurovision Song Contest 2008. She passed the first 4 rounds, beating Marquess, Cinema Bizarre and Tommy Reeve, however in the final selection she lost to No Angels with "Disappear", taking second place with 49.5% of the votes.

== Charts ==
Chart (2008)	Position
German Singles Chart	44

== Track listing ==
1. "Hinterm Ozean" (Radio Version) – 3:00
2. "Hinterm Ozean" (Unplugged version) – 3:16
3. "Hinterm Ozean" (Orchestra version) – 3:14
4. "Far Beyond the Sea" ("Hinterm Ozean" - English version) – 3:15
