= Ses plus grands succès (Desireless album) =

Studio album by Desireless
- Released: 2003
- Genre: Electronic, Synthpop
- Label: Sony Music Media
- Producer: Jean Michel Rivat

Desireless chronology
I Love You (1994)	Ses plus grands succès (2003)	Un brin de paille (2004)

Ses plus grands succès is a compilation album by Desireless, released in 2003. It includes two tracks that were never released on CD previously, "Qui peut savoir (remix)" and "Voyage, voyage (PWL Britmix)". It also includes two never-before-released tracks, "Van Gogh" and "Dans le jardin d'Eden".

== Track listing ==
Catalogue number: SMM 5104322

1. "Voyage, voyage" - 4.23
2. "John" - 4.13
3. "Van Gogh" - 4.25
4. "Il dort" - 4.23
5. "Qui sommes-nous?" - 4.29
6. "Bossa fragile" - 3.24
7. "Tombee d'une montagne" - 5.07
8. "L'amour, l'amour" - 4.19
9. "Hari om ramakrishna" - 5.10
10. "Je crois en toi"- 4.18
11. "Elle est comme les etoiles"- 4.13
12. "I love you" - 4.06
13. "Dans le jardin d'Eden" - 3.38
14. "Qui peut savoir" (Remix) - 6.35
15. "Le retour"- 3.22
16. "Les escaliers du bal" - 3.54
17. "Voyage, voyage" (PWL Britmix) - 7.03
