= Christmas Chants =

Studio album by Gregorian
- Released: 2006
- Recorded: Nemo Studio, 2006
- Genre: Gregorian chant

Gregorian chronology
Masters of Chant Chapter V (2006)	Christmas Chants (2006)	Masters of Chant Chapter VI (2007)

Christmas Chants is a studio album by the Gregorian chant band Gregorian. It was released in 2006 on Nemo Studio. In 2008 a special edition titled Christmas Chants & Visions was released, containing the original CD with two bonus tracks, and a DVD. The live concert DVD was filmed in Berlin in December 2007 during Gregorian's Christmas tour.

== Track listing ==
1. "Ave Maria" (featuring Julian)
2. "Silent Night"
3. "When a Child Is Born" (featuring Sarah Brightman)
4. "Amazing Grace"
5. "The First Noël" (featuring Amelia Brightman)
6. "In the Bleak Midwinter"
7. "Pie Jesu"
8. "A Spaceman Came Travelling" (Chris de Burgh)
9. "O Come All Ye Faithful"
10. "Gloria in Excelsis"
11. "Footsteps in the Snow"
12. "Peace on Earth/Little Drummer Boy" (featuring Amelia Brightman)
13. "Sweeter the Bells"
14. "Child in a Manger"
15. "Happy Xmas (War Is Over)" (John Lennon) (featuring Amelia Brightman)
16. "Auld Lang Syne"
17. "Last Christmas" (bonus track) (featuring Carolin Fortenbacher)
18. "Moment of Peace" (Christmas version) (bonus track) (featuring Sarah Brightman)

=== Christmas Visions ===
1. "Ave Maria"
2. "Silent Night"
3. "When a Child Is Born"
4. "Sweeter the Bells"
5. "In the Bleak Midwinter"
6. "Peace on Earth"
7. "Child in a Manger"
8. "Greensleeves"
9. "Miracle of Love"
10. "The Circle"
11. "Mad World"
12. "Crying in the Rain"
13. "Sacrifice"
14. "Kyrie"
15. "Moment of Peace"
16. "Angels"
17. "Noël Nouvelet"
18. "Hymn"
19. "Happy Xmas (War Is Over)"

== Certifications ==
Region	Certification	Certified units/sales
Germany (BVMI)	Gold	100,000^{^}
^{^} Shipments figures based on certification alone.
