= The Dark Side (Gregorian album) =

Gregorian - The Dark Side

Studio album by Gregorian
- Released: November 15, 2004
- Recorded: Nemo Studio
- Genre: Gregorian chant Dark ambient Rock
- Length: 63:00
- Label: Edel America Records

Gregorian chronology
Masters of Chant Chapter IV (2003)	Gregorian - The Dark Side (2004)	Masters of Chant Chapter V (2006)

The Dark Side is Gregorian's sixth album, released between Masters of Chant Chapter IV and Masters of Chant Chapter V. Technically, it was followed by The Masterpieces, however, The Masterpieces is only a collection of previously released songs.

In some areas, the limited edition of The Dark Side was released as Masters of Chant Chapter V leading to some confusion when that title was used for the subsequent album.

== Track listing ==
=== Standard Edition ===
1. Hurt (Nine Inch Nails) (6:20)
2. My Immortal (Evanescence) (5:26)
3. The Four Horsemen (Aphrodite's Child) (4:51)
4. Unbeliever (4:18)
5. Where the Wild Roses Grow (featuring Amelia Brightman) (Nick Cave and the Bad Seeds and Kylie Minogue) (4:51)
6. Close My Eyes Forever (Lita Ford and Ozzy Osbourne) (6:00)
7. More (The Sisters of Mercy) (6:05)
8. Uninvited (featuring Annette Stangenberg) (Alanis Morissette) (4:25)
9. The Raven (The Alan Parsons Project) (5:28)
10. Gregorian Anthem (6:07)
11. Ave Satani (The Omen) (Jerry Goldsmith) (3:27)
12. The End (The Doors) (2:06)
13. In the Shadows (The Rasmus) (4:29)

=== Limited Edition ===
On the Limited Edition, the song Engel (Rammstein), featuring vocals by Marjan Shaki, is between the tracks Gregorian Anthem and Ave Satani (The Omen), making it the eleventh track:

1. Hurt (Nine Inch Nails) (6:19)
2. My Immortal (Evanescence) (5:26)
3. The Four Horsemen (Aphrodite's Child) (4:52)
4. Unbeliever (4:20)
5. Where the Wild Roses Grow (featuring Amelia Brightman) (Nick Cave and the Bad Seeds and Kylie Minogue) (4:50)
6. Close My Eyes Forever (Lita Ford and Ozzy Osbourne) (6:00)
7. More (The Sisters of Mercy) (6:05)
8. Uninvited (featuring Annette Stangenberg) (Alanis Morissette) (4:21)
9. The Raven (The Alan Parsons Project) (5:34)
10. Gregorian Anthem (5:17)
11. Engel (featuring Marjan Shaki) (Rammstein) (5:59)
12. Ave Satani (The Omen) (Jerry Goldsmith) (3:28)
13. The End (The Doors) (2:03)
14. In the Shadows (The Rasmus) (4:31)

=== Special Rock Edition ===
The 'Special Rock Edition' featured ten tracks. The notable differences from the standard edition are the omission of three tracks (Where the Wild Roses Grow, Uninvited and The End), the ordering of the tracks, as well as the length of the existing tracks; some are shorter. This edition also includes an extended version of Nothing Else Matters, from Gregorian's first Masters of Chant album.

1. Ave Satani (The Omen) (Jerry Goldsmith) (3:06)
2. Hurt (Nine Inch Nails) (6:19)
3. My Immortal (Evanescence) (5:26)
4. The Four Horsemen (Aphrodite's Child) (4:52)
5. Unbeliever (4:10)
6. More (The Sisters of Mercy) (4:53)
7. Close My Eyes Forever (Lita Ford and Ozzy Osbourne) (5:06)
8. Gregorian Anthem (5:40)
9. The Raven (The Alan Parsons Project) (5:03)
10. Nothing Else Matters (Extended Version) (Metallica) (6:36)
