= Dive (Swedish band) =

Swedish musical group

Dive was a Swedish band which consisted of Chris Lancelot (a.k.a. Krister Linder) and Erik Holmberg. They released three albums. A fourth album was recorded but not released. Their debut single was also their biggest commercial success; "Captain Nemo" was later covered by Sarah Brightman on her 1993 album Dive.

Both members have gone on to solo careers as producers and artists. Linder moved into electronic music, recording as Yeti and Tupilaq, but returned to vocals with a solo album, "Songs from the Silent Years" in 2006. He also started to compose music for movies and has recorded the soundtrack to Metropia, The Nile Hilton Incident and Boy from Heaven.

== Discography ==
- Where the River Turns to Sea (1990) - Sweden #35
- Stills (1992) - Sweden #32
- Dive Transmit/Receive (1994) - Sweden #43
