= Captain Nemo (song) =

1990 song by Dive

"Captain Nemo" is the debut single by Swedish band Dive (Chris Lancelot and Erik Holmberg), released in 1990. The song is named after the legendary character Captain Nemo from the 1870 Jules Verne novel Twenty Thousand Leagues Under the Seas.

== Sarah Brightman version ==
"Captain Nemo"

Single by Sarah Brightman

from the album Dive
- A-side: "Captain Nemo"
- B-side: "When It Rains in America"; "Island"
- Released: 1993
- Recorded: 1993
- Studio: Nemo Studio (Hamburg, Germany)
- Genre: Classical crossover
- Label: A&M
- Songwriter: Holmberg/Lancelot
- Producer: Frank Peterson

Sarah Brightman singles chronology
"Amigos Para Siempre'" (1992)	"Captain Nemo" (1993)	"The Second Element" (1993)

Music video
- "Captain Nemo" on YouTube

Audio sample
- file; help

"Captain Nemo" is the first single from British soprano Sarah Brightman's 1993 album, Dive. A music video was made for the song.

=== Critical reception ===
Music & Media commented in their review, "Mostly she's featured in Andrew Lloyd Webber-composed musicals; now you have to judge her on her own merits. At least as interesting as Kate Bush and Tori Amos."

=== Track listing ===
1. "Captain Nemo (Radio edit)"
2. "When it Rains in America"
3. "Island"
4. "Captain Nemo" (Extended album version)

=== Alternate 2-track edition ===
1. "Captain Nemo (Radio Edit)"
2. "Island (LP Version)"

== Other covers ==
- Cecilia Vennersten recorded a Swedish version of the song on her self-titled 1995 debut album.
