= Masters of Chant Chapter II =

Studio album by Gregorian
- Released: 15 October 2001
- Recorded: 2001
- Studio: Angel Recording Studios (London); Henry Wood Hall (London); Nemo Studios (Hamburg); Vox Klangstudio (Bendestorf)
- Genre: Gregorian chant
- Label: Edel America
- Producer: Carsten Heusmann, Jan-Eric Kohrs & Michael Soltau

Gregorian chronology
| Masters of Chant (1999) | Masters of Chant Chapter II (2001) | Masters of Chant Chapter III (2002) |

Masters of Chant Chapter II is the third album by Gregorian.

== Track listing ==
1. "Moment of Peace" (featuring Sarah Brightman) (original by Gregorian) (4:22)
2. "The First Time Ever I Saw Your Face" (Ewan MacColl) (original by Peggy Seeger) (6:00)
3. "In the Air Tonight" (Phil Collins) (original by Phil Collins) (5:45)
4. "Bonny Portmore" (Celtic traditional) (5:02)
5. "Hymn" (John Lees) (original by Barclay James Harvest) (6:07)
6. "Child in Time" (Ritchie Blackmore, Ian Gillan, Roger Glover, Jon Lord, Ian Paice) (original by Deep Purple) (5:20)
7. "Everybody's Got to Learn Sometime" (James Warren) (original by The Korgis) (5:19)
8. "Wish You Were Here" (David Gilmour, Roger Waters) (original by Pink Floyd) (5:32)
9. "Lady D'Arbanville" (Cat Stevens) (original by Cat Stevens) (4:46)
10. "Heaven Can Wait" (Jim Steinman) (original by Meat Loaf) (5:53)
11. "Babylon" (text from Psalm 137) (original by Don McLean) (3:05)
12. "Stairway to Heaven" (featuring Amelia Brightman) (Jimmy Page, Robert Plant) (original by Led Zeppelin) (8:05)

=== French, Belgian and Portuguese bonus tracks ===
13. "Voyage Voyage" (featuring Sarah Brightman) (Dominique Dubois, J. Michael Rivat) (original by Desireless) (3:57)
14. "Rêver" (Laurent Boutonnat, Mylène Farmer) (original by Mylène Farmer) (5:00)
15. "Instant de Paix (Moment of Peace)" (featuring Amelia Brightman) (4:00)
16. "Moment of Peace (Portuguese version)" (featuring Amelia Brightman) (4:00)
17. "Moment of Peace (Spanish version)" (featuring Amelia Brightman) (4:00)

=== Japanese bonus tracks ===
13. "Breathe" (John Mallory, Leigh Nash, Michelle Tumes) (original by Sixpence None the Richer) (3:53)
14. "Make Us One" (Cindy Morgan, Michael W. Smith) (original by Cindy Morgan) (3:15)

== Charts ==
=== Weekly charts ===
| Chart (2001–2002) | Peak position |
|---|---|
| Austrian Albums (Ö3 Austria) | 18 |
| Belgian Albums (Ultratop Flanders) | 4 |
| Belgian Albums (Ultratop Wallonia) | 15 |
| Dutch Albums (Album Top 100) | 47 |
| Finnish Albums (Suomen virallinen lista) | 3 |
| French Albums (SNEP) | 58 |
| Hungarian Albums (MAHASZ) | 3 |
| New Zealand Albums (RMNZ) | 41 |
| Norwegian Albums (VG-lista) | 31 |
| Swedish Albums (Sverigetopplistan) | 14 |
| Swiss Albums (Schweizer Hitparade) | 20 |

=== Year-end charts ===
| Chart (2001) | Position |
|---|---|
| Belgian Albums (Ultratop Flanders) | 84 |
| German Albums (Offizielle Top 100) | 91 |
| Swedish Albums (Sverigetopplistan) | 61 |

== Certifications and sales ==
| Region | Certification | Certified units/sales |
|---|---|---|
| Belgium (BRMA) | Gold | 25,000^{*} |
| Finland (Musiikkituottajat) | Platinum | 43,706 |
| France (SNEP) | Gold | 100,000^{*} |
| Germany (BVMI) | Gold | 150,000^{^} |
| Hungary (MAHASZ) | Gold | |
^{*} Sales figures based on certification alone.^{^} Shipments figures based on certification alone.
