= So Sad (Gregorian song) =

1991 single by Gregorian

Single by Gregorian

from the album Sadisfaction
- B-side: "Depressions"
- Released: 1991
- Recorded: 1991
- Genre: Pop, new-age
- Length: 3:32
- Label: Metronome
- Songwriter(s): Frank Peterson
- Producer(s): Frank Peterson

Gregorian singles chronology
| "So Sad" (1991) | "Once in a Lifetime" (1991) |

"So Sad" is the debut single recorded by German band Gregorian. It was written and produced by Frank Peterson, and is from the album Sadisfaction (1991), on which it appears as the third track. The song is composed of Gregorian chants using biblical verses while in the chorus a woman is asking Jesus Christ why she is so sad. In the music video, she first enters a church, then becomes a nun. The song was included on Gregorian's best of compilation titled Best of 1990–2010, released in 2011, on which it appears as the first track. It became a hit in France and Portugal.

== Critical reception ==
According to Elia Habib, an expert of the French chart, "So Sad" is a more pop-oriented song than Enigma's ones, on which Peterson also worked, as the chorus is sung in English in a very contemporary phrasing. When reviewing the new singles releases, Music & Media stated: "It's hard to tell the difference [with Enigma], although this time there is the choice of a Monastery Sex Mix".

== Chart performance ==
In Switzerland, "So Sad" charted for four weeks on the top 30, peaking for two weeks at number 17. In France, it debuted at number 48 on the chart edition of 16 March 1991, reached a peak of number nine in its eleventh week and fell off the top 50 after 15 weeks. It was a number one hit in Portugal, reaching this position on 8 June 1991. On the European Hot 100, it debuted at number 54 on 6 April 1991, peaked at number 35 in its tenth week, and dropped from the chart after 13 weeks of presence.

== Track listings ==
- CD single
1. "So Sad" — 3:32
2. "Depressions" — 2:57
- CD maxi
1. "So Sad" (Extended Sacrifice) — 4:49
2. "So Sad" (Radio Version) — 3:32
3. "So Sad" (Monastery Sex Mix) — 5:18
4. "Depressions" — 2:57
- 12" maxi
1. "So Sad" (Extended Sacrifice) — 4:49
2. "So Sad" (Radio Version) — 3:32
3. "So Sad" (Monastery Sex Mix) — 5:18
4. "Depressions" — 2:57

== Charts ==
Weekly chart performance for "So Sad"
| Chart (1991) | Peak position |
|---|---|
| Europe (Eurochart Hot 100 Singles) | 35 |
| France (SNEP) | 9 |
| Portugal (UNEVA) | 1 |
| Switzerland (Schweizer Hitparade) | 17 |
