= John (Desireless song) =

Single by Desireless

from the album François
- B-side: "John (tempo 120)"
- Released: 1988
- Recorded: 1988
- Genre: Synthpop
- Length: 3:58
- Label: CBS Records
- Songwriter(s): Jean-Michel Rivat
- Producer(s): Jean-Michel Rivat

Desireless singles chronology
"Voyage, voyage" (1986)	"John" (1988)	"Qui sommes-nous?" (1989)

"John" is a synthpop song recorded by French singer Desireless. It was the second single from the album François on which it is the tenth track. Following the huge success of "Voyage Voyage", it was released in May 1988. Written and produced by Jean-Michel Rivat, the song was Desireless' last hit single in France.

== Lyrics ==
"John" deals with a man named John, apparently a soldier, who died during a mission. The lyrics mention several locations referring to conflicts in the 20th century: Hanoi and Haiphong (Vietnam War, 1945-54 / 1964-1975), Madrid (Spanish Civil War, 1936–39), Port Said (second Israeli-Arab war, 1956), Baghdad (Iran-Iraq, 1980–88), Berlin (Second World War, Cold War). Several Gods worshiped in various religions are also cited in the lyrics, such as God, Jehovah (Christianity, Judaism), Allah (Islam), Brahma and Vishnu (Hinduism). The narrator questions whether it matters who the symbolic "John" fought for (On his flag/there are stars, crowns/there are sickles, hammers/What does it matter?"), where he came from (He lives on a farm/in Loir-et-Cher/a tent on the edge of the desert/what does it matter?"), or what religion he was ("He says Bramah/he says Jehovah"), and she says that he "died in mid-flight" over Hanoi or Madrid or "died in flames" south of Baghdad or Port Said.

== Critical reception ==
A review from Music & Media stated: "Although less accessible than "Voyage, Voyage", the single is another driving electro-pop single sporting a passionate, subtle chorus. Production by Michel Rivat is excellent and carries that special, spatial atmosphere, so suitable for the pan-European market".

== Chart performance ==
Released in several European countries, notably in France, where it became a top five hit in July 1988 and remained for 18 weeks on the chart (top 50), nine of them in the top ten. It was released in UK in a remixed version produced by Les Adams, but was a relative failure (a sole week on the chart, at number 92), while it failed the chart in the Netherlands. Yet, the song was a big hit - as its predecessor - in Spain, reaching n°8.

== Versions ==
An acoustic version of "John" was recorded by Desireless on her 2004 album Un brin de paille, on her 2007 double album More Love and Good Vibrations and on her 2003 best of Ses plus grands succès. The image on the single cover is a screenshot from the music video. A new arrangement of the song was produced with Desireless' new musical partner, Antoine Aureche (AKA Operation of the Sun) for the 2013 album L'Oeuf de Dragon.

== Track listings ==
- 7" single
1. "John" – 3:58
2. "John" (tempo 120) – 4:12
- 12" maxi
1. "John" (remix) – 6:28
2. "John" – 4:21
- CD maxi
1. "John" – 4:19
2. "John" (remix) – 6:27
3. "Voyage Voyage" (extended remix) – 6:45
- 7" single - Remix
1. "John" (London remix) – 4:14
2. "John" (London re-remix) – 4:14
- 12" maxi - Remix
1. "John" (London remix) – 6:17
2. "John" (London remix - single version) – 4:11
3. "Voyage Voyage" (britmix) – 7:06

== Credits ==
- Chorus by Desireless and Michel Laurent
- Mixed by Dominique Blanc-Francard and S.Prestage, at Digital Services
- Recorded at Studio Colour by Antoine Cambourakis and Steve Prestage
- Photography by François De La Noisette
- Written, arranged and produced by Jean-Michel Rivat
- Editions : Rivat Music

== Charts and certifications ==
=== Weekly charts ===
1988 weekly chart performance for "John"
Chart (1988)	Peak position
Belgium (Ultratop 50 Wallonia)	9 (Note: The exact peak position in Belgium (Wallonia) is unknown. The single reached at least number 9, as Music & Media provided the single's ranking only for that week, but it did not reach the top three, given every week by the magazine.)
Europe (European Airplay Top 50)	32
Europe (European Hot 100)	17
Finland (Suomen virallinen lista)	20
France (SNEP)	5
Spain (AFYVE)	8
UK (OCC)	92

=== Year-end charts ===
1988 year-end chart performance for "John"
Chart (1988)	Position
Europe (Eurochart Hot 100)	81

=== Certifications ===
Certifications for "John"
Region	Certification	Certified units/sales
France (SNEP)	Silver	250,000^{*}
^{*} Sales figures based on certification alone.
