= Drama (Carolin Fortenbacher album) =

Studio album by Carolin Fortenbacher
- Released: 7 March 2008
- Recorded: Nemo Studio
- Genre: Pop rock
- Label: Warner
- Producer: Frank Peterson

Carolin Fortenbacher chronology
Zurück zu mir (2005)	Drama (2008)

Singles from Drama
- 1. "Hinterm Ozean" Released: 29 February 2008

Drama is the second solo studio album by German singer and actress Carolin Fortenbacher, released in 2008.

== Background ==
Drama features "Hinterm Ozean", the song with which Fortenbacher entered the Grand Prix Vorentscheid 2008, as a possible German entry to Eurovision 2008. The album was produced by Frank Peterson and released by Warner.

== Track listing ==
1. "Hinterm Ozean" (Album version)
2. "Du kannst mich verstehen"
3. "Lass das Licht an"
4. "Meine große Liebe"
5. "Um die Welt in einem Tag"
6. "Sie"
7. "Happy Hour (Sorrento Moon)"
8. "Dass du es bist"
9. "Für eine Frau wie mich"
10. "Liebesramadan"
11. "Der hellste Stern"
12. "Dein zweites Gesicht"
13. "Ich nehm' den weiten Weg"

== Charts ==
Chart (2008)	Position
German Album Chart	50
