= Frenética =

Frenetica

Studio album by Marquess
- Released: 29 June 2007
- Genre: Latin pop
- Length: 41:48
- Label: Starwatch
- Producer: Christian Fleps; Sascha Pierro; Dominik Decker; Marco Heggen

Marquess chronology
Marquess (2006)	Frenetica (2007)	¡Ya! (2008)

Frenetica is the second studio album by German Latin-pop band Marquess. It was released on 29 June 2007 by Starwatch Music. The album spawned two singles, including "You and Not Tokio" and "Vayamos Companeros," the latter of which became a number one hit on the Swiss Albums Chart.

== Critical reception ==
Professional ratings
Review scores
Source	Rating
laut.de	2/5 stars

Simon Windegger from laut.de rated the album two ouf of five stars. He wrote: "All in all, though, the mush doesn't taste all that bad. There's definitely some salt in it, and now and then even a hint of pepper. The only lingering feeling is that you've somehow heard it all before—somewhere on vacation, perhaps. What remains is the certainty that there's no real way to resist the Spanish fever that spreads through Germany year after year."

== Track listing ==
1. "Mañana" – 3:35
2. "Vayamos Compañeros" – 3:01
3. "En España" – 3:12
4. "You and not Tokio" (featuring S.A.M.) – 3:38
5. "No Importa" – 3:18
6. "El Temperamento" (Spanish Single Version) – 3:20
7. "La Discoteca" – 3:17
8. "Puerta de la Noche" – 4:08
9. "Radio Increible" – 2:59
10. "Todo bien Mariha" (featuring Mariha) – 3:39
11. "Lo Siento y Adios" – 3:49
12. "Dove ti Porta" – 3:48

== Charts ==
=== Weekly charts ===
Weekly chart performance for Frenética
Chart (2007)	Peak position
Austrian Albums (Ö3 Austria)	27
German Albums (Offizielle Top 100)	2
Swiss Albums (Schweizer Hitparade)	4

=== Year-end charts ===
Year-end chart performance for Frenética
Chart (2007)	Position
German Albums (Official Top 100)	45

== Certifications ==
Certifications for Frenética
Region	Certification	Certified units/sales
Germany (BVMI)	Platinum	200,000^{^}
Switzerland (IFPI Switzerland)	Gold	15,000^{^}
^{^} Shipments figures based on certification alone.
