= Antoine Aureche =

French musician

- Born: 4 December 1981 (age 44); Annecy, France
- Genres: Electropop, classical music, progressive rock
- Occupations: Musician, producer
- Instruments: Keyboard, guitar
- Website: valfeu.com

Antoine Aureche (born 4 December 1981), also known as Valfeu, is a French musician, producer and video maker. He is mainly known for his duet with the French pop artist Desireless. Aureche’s music takes inspiration from several genres, including classical music, electropop and progressive rock.

== Biography ==
Aureche studied music at the conservatory in Annecy. He was influenced by progressive rock, including music by King Crimson, Gentle Giant, and Robert Wyatt. In 2000, Aureche released his first album, Urdoxa, with his band Thork.

In 2006, Aureche created TAT, an experimental musical project that led to him signing with the Swiss record label Urgence Disk Records. He recorded three albums with Urgence Disk: Quinta Essentia (2006), Le Sperme De Tous Les Métaux (2007) and Testament (2010). Through TAT, Aureche collaborated with several underground artists, such as Le Chiffre, VX 69 of Punish Yourself, and Adobe of Chaos artists Laurie Lipton and Laurent Courau.

In 2008, Aureche began recording electro music under the name Operation of the Sun. Under this name he released a debut album, Solar Squirrels Exodus, in 2009, and another album, Désir Parabolique, in 2011. As Operation Of The Sun, Aureche collaborated with artists including Greta Gratos and The Eternal Afflict.

In 2011, Aureche met Desireless. Together, they decided to create a duet called Desireless & Operation of the Sun. The project was supported by collaborators including Solar Fake, The Eternal Afflict, Oil 10, BAK XIII and Psyche. Following the project, Aureche continued to perform with Desireless at concerts and festivals. In 2016, Aureche and Desireless created a musical theatre show in tribute to the French poet Guillaume Apollinaire for the Apollinaire Museum in Belgium. The project was titled Guillaume, and later became an album titled Desireless chante Apollinaire featuring Valfeu.

In 2018, Aureche started using the pseudonym Valfeu. As Valfeu, he released an electronic symphony, Faust, based on Goethe's eponymous play. Collaborators on the project included Sue Denim of Robots in Disguise, Desireless, Cheerleader 69, Titend and Music for the Space.

In February 2019, TAT was renamed Tat Resurrectio. With Tat Resurrectio, Antoine performs a neofolk show (featuring Le Chiffre, Nevah and Diabolus in Viola) as supporting act for Brendan Perry of Dead Can Dance. The city of Lyon, France, recognizes him as an official artist of the program "40 ans de Musiques Actuelles à Lyon".

Aureche teaches at the Academy of Music and Dance in Miribel, Ain.
