= Germany in the Eurovision Song Contest 2008 =

- Eurovision Song Contest 2008
- Participating broadcaster: ARD (Note: Arbeitsgemeinschaft der öffentlich-rechtlichen Rundfunkanstalten der Bundesrepublik Deutschland) – Norddeutscher Rundfunk (NDR)
- Country: Germany
- Selection process: Der deutsche Vorentscheid 2008 – Wer singt für Deutschland?
- Selection date: 6 March 2008

Competing entry
- Song: "Disappear"
- Artist: No Angels
- Songwriters: Remee; Thomas Troelsen; Hanne Sørvaag

Placement
- Final result: 23rd, 14 points

Participation chronology

Germany was represented at the Eurovision Song Contest 2008 with the song "Disappear", written by Remee, Thomas Troelsen, and Hanne Sørvaag, and performed by the group No Angels. The German participating broadcaster on behalf of ARD, Norddeutscher Rundfunk (NDR), organised the national final Der deutsche Vorentscheid 2008 – Wer singt für Deutschland? in order to select their entry for the contest. The national final took place on 6 March 2008 and featured five competing acts with the winner being selected through two rounds of public televoting. "Disappear" performed by No Angels was selected as the German entry for Belgrade after gaining 50.5% of the votes in the second round.

As a member of the "Big Four", Germany automatically qualified to compete in the final of the Eurovision Song Contest. Performing in position 4, Germany placed twenty-third out of the 25 participating countries with 14 points.

== Background ==
Prior to the 2008 contest, ARD had participated in the Eurovision Song Contest representing Germany fifty-one times since its debut in 1956. It has won the contest on one occasion: in 1982 with the song "Ein bißchen Frieden" performed by Nicole. Germany, to this point, has been noted for having competed in the contest more than any other country; they have competed in every contest since the first edition in 1956 except for 1996 when it was eliminated in a pre-contest elimination round. In 2007, the German entry "Frauen regier'n die Welt" performed by Roger Cicero placed nineteen out of twenty-four competing songs.

As part of its duties as participating broadcaster, ARD organises the selection of its entry in the Eurovision Song Contest and broadcasts the event in the country. Since 1996, ARD had delegated the participation in the contest to its member Norddeutscher Rundfunk (NDR). NDR confirmed that it would participate in the 2008 contest on 26 September 2007. Since 1996, NDR had set up national finals with several artists to choose both the song and performer to compete at Eurovision for Germany. On 22 December 2007, the broadcaster announced that it would organise a multi-artist national final to select the German entry.

== Before Eurovision ==
=== Der deutsche Vorentscheid 2008 – Wer singt für Deutschland? ===
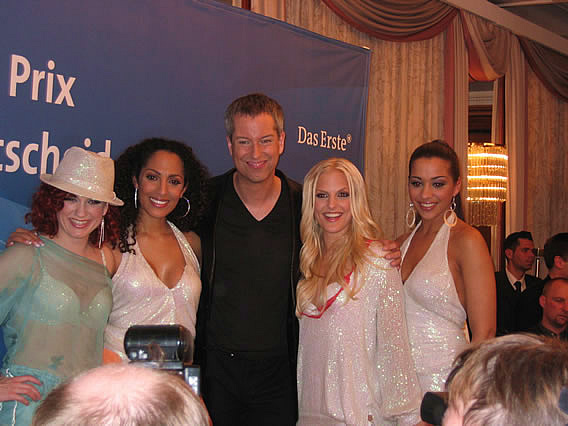
No Angels at the Der deutsche Vorentscheid 2008 – Wer singt für Deutschland? press conference

Der deutsche Vorentscheid 2008 – Wer singt für Deutschland? (English: The German Preliminary Decision 2008 – Who sings for Germany?) was the competition that selected the German entry for the Eurovision Song Contest 2008. The competition took place on 6 March 2008 at the Deutsches Schauspielhaus in Hamburg, hosted by Thomas Hermanns. Five acts competed during the show with the winner being selected through a public televote. The show was broadcast on Das Erste as well as online via the broadcaster's Eurovision Song Contest website eurovision.de. The national final was watched by 3.47 million viewers in Germany with a market share of 11%.

==== Competing entries ====
Five acts were selected by a panel consisting of representatives of NDR from proposals received by the broadcaster from record companies. The five participating acts were announced on 10 January 2008. A celebrity also supported each of the artists: Cinema Bizarre by actor Tetje Mierendorf, Carolin Fortenbacher by Katja Ebstein (who represented Germany in 1970, 1971, and 1980), Marquess by comedian Oliver Pocher, No Angels by Tagesschau news anchor Marc Bator, and Tommy Reeve by singer and presenter Kim Fisher.

==== Final ====
The televised final took place on 6 March 2008. The winner was selected through two rounds of public televoting, including options for landline and SMS voting. In the first round of voting, the top two entries were selected to proceed to the second round. In the second round, the winner, "Disappear" performed by No Angels, was selected. In addition to the performances of the competing entries, Roger Cicero (who represented Germany in 2007) as well as former winners of the Eurovision Song Contest Charlotte Perrelli (Sweden 1999), Ruslana (Ukraine 2004), Marija Šerifović (Serbia 2007) performed their respective entries.

First Round – 6 March 2008
R/O	Artist	Song	Songwriter(s)	Result
1	Marquess	"La histeria"	Christian Fleps; Dominik Decker; Marco Heggen; Sascha Pierrom	—N/a
2	Tommy Reeve	"Just One Woman"	Tommy Lee James; Lee Ryan; Jamie Hartman	—N/a
3	Cinema Bizarre	"Forever or Never"	Remee; Thomas Troelsen	—N/a
4	Carolin Fortenbacher	"Hinterm Ozean"	Pe Werner; Peter Koobs	Advanced
5	No Angels	"Disappear"	Remee; Thomas Troelsen; Hanne Sørvaag	Advanced

Second Round – 6 March 2008
R/O	Artist	Song	Televote	Place
1	Carolin Fortenbacher	"Hinterm Ozean"	49.5%	2
2	No Angels	"Disappear"	50.5%	1

== At Eurovision ==
It was announced in September 2007 that the competition's format would be expanded to two semi-finals in 2008. According to the rules, all nations with the exceptions of the host country and the "Big Four" (France, Germany, Spain, and the United Kingdom) are required to qualify from one of two semi-finals in order to compete for the final; the top nine songs from each semi-final as determined by televoting progress to the final, and a tenth was determined by back-up juries. As a member of the "Big Four", Germany automatically qualified to compete in the final on 24 May 2008. In addition to their participation in the final, Germany is also required to broadcast and vote in one of the two semi-finals. During the semi-final allocation draw on 24 January 2008, Germany was assigned to broadcast and vote in the first semi-final on 20 May 2008.

In Germany, the two shows were broadcast on Das Erste which featured commentary by Peter Urban. The final was also broadcast on hr3 which featured commentary by Tim Frühling and on NDR 2 which featured commentary by Thomas Mohr. The final was watched by 6.4 million viewers in Germany, which meant a market share of 28 per cent. NDR appointed Thomas Hermanns as its spokesperson to announced the top 12-point score awarded by the German televote during the final.

=== Final ===
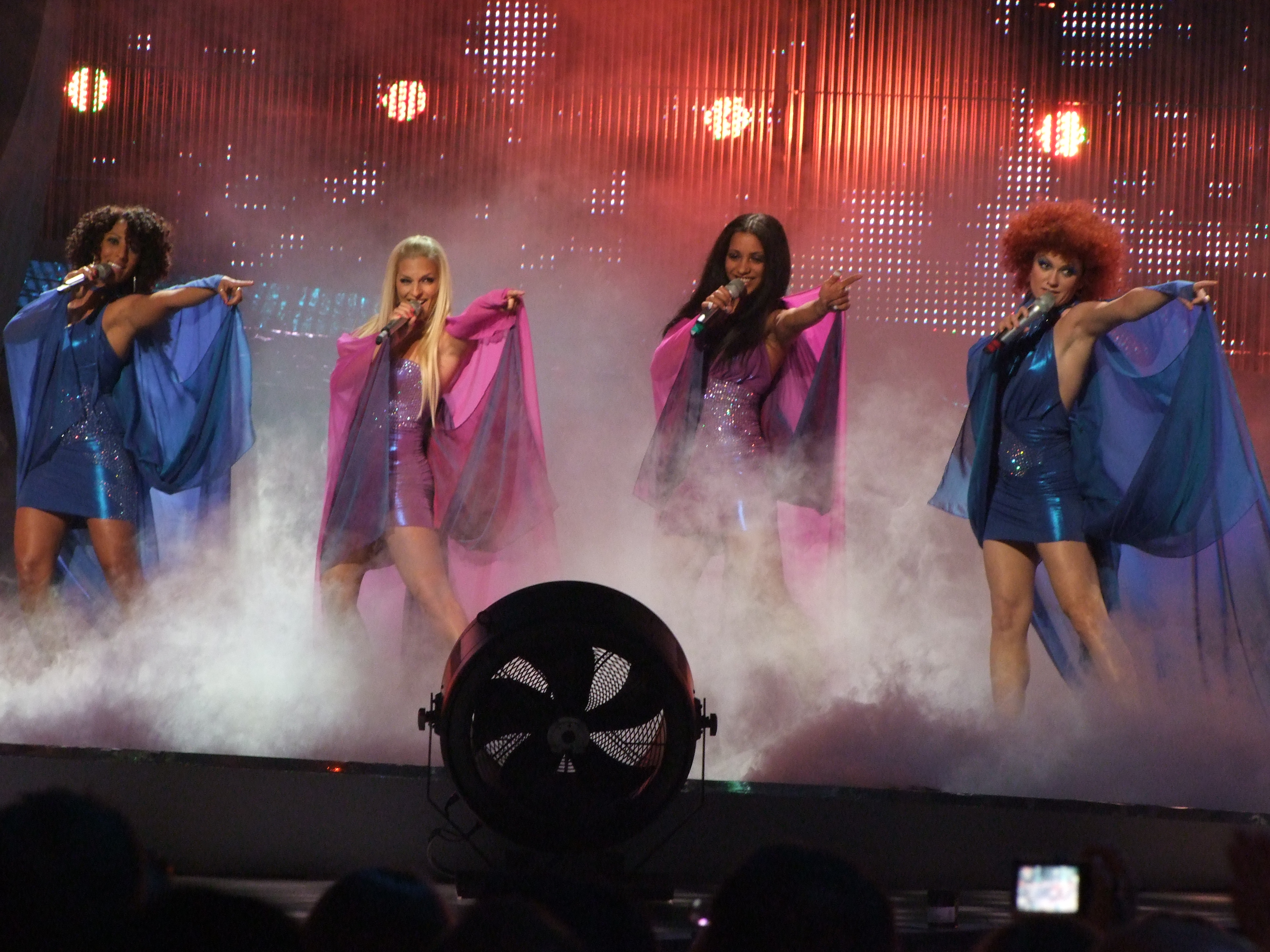
No Angels during a rehearsal before the final

No Angels took part in technical rehearsals on 17 and 18 May, followed by dress rehearsals on 23 and 24 May. During the running order draw for the semi-finals and the final on 17 March 2008, Germany was placed to perform in position 4 in the final, following the entry from Albania and before the entry from Armenia.

The German performance featured the members of No Angels performing a choreographed routine on stage. Two of the group members, Jessica Wahls and Lucy Diakovska, wore a bright blue outfit, while the other two members, Nadja Benaissa and Sandy Mölling, wore a purple outfit. The LED screens displayed flying feathers on a blue ground and the performance featured the use of wind machines as well as smoke and pyrotechnic effects. An off-stage backing vocalist, Katie Okwuazu, also joined No Angels. Germany placed twenty-third in the final, scoring 14 points.

=== Voting ===
Below is a breakdown of points awarded to Germany and awarded by Germany in the first semi-final and grand final of the contest, and the breakdown of the voting conducted during the two shows. Germany awarded its 12 points both in the first semi-final and the grand final of the contest to Greece.

==== Points awarded to Germany ====
Points awarded to Germany (Final)
Score	Country
12 points	Bulgaria
10 points	
8 points	
7 points	
6 points	
5 points	
4 points	
3 points	
2 points	Switzerland
1 point	

==== Points awarded by Germany ====
Points awarded by Germany (Semi-final 1)
Score	Country
12 points	Greece
10 points	Armenia
8 points	Azerbaijan
7 points	Bosnia and Herzegovina
6 points	Russia
5 points	Poland
4 points	Israel
3 points	Romania
2 points	Finland
1 point	Norway

Points awarded by Germany (Final)
Score	Country
12 points	Greece
10 points	Turkey
8 points	Serbia
7 points	Russia
6 points	Armenia
5 points	Bosnia and Herzegovina
4 points	Portugal
3 points	Israel
2 points	Croatia
1 point	Azerbaijan
