= François (album) =

Studio album by Desireless
- Released: 30 October 1989
- Recorded: 1986–1989
- Studio: Studio Colour, Studio D'Aguesseau
- Genre: Eurodisco, synthpop
- Label: CBS
- Producer: Jean Michel Rivat

Desireless chronology
François (1989)	I Love You (1994)

Alternative cover
- 2001 re-release

François is the French-language debut album by Desireless, released in 1989 and re-released in 2001. The single "Voyage, voyage" was a chart topper in many European and Asian single charts.

== Track listing ==
- All songs written by Jean Michel Rivat, except "Qui Sommes-Nous" and "Voyage, voyage" (Rivat/Dominique Dubois)
1. "Qui Sommes-Nous" – 4:31
2. "Animal" – 4:48
3. "Hari ôm Ramakrishna" – 5:11
4. "Tombée d'une montagne" – 5:07
5. "Dis pourquoi (New age mix)" – 0:36
6. "Oublie-les, oublie" – 3:58
7. "Les commencements" – 4:04
8. "Elle est comme les étoiles" – 4:15
9. "Qui peut savoir" – 3:48
10. "John" – 4:14
11. "Dis pourquoi" – 4:42
12. "Voyage, voyage" – 4:22

=== 2001 CD re-release track listing ===
Label: Choice of Music Catalogue number: 200 105-2

1. "Voyage, voyage" – 4.24
2. "John" – 4.13
3. "Qui sommes-nous" – 4.28
4. "Elle est comme les étoiles" – 4.14
5. "Animal" – 4.48
6. "Hari ôm Ramakrishna" – 5:10
7. "Tombée d'une montagne" – 5:08
8. "Oublie-les, oublie" – 3:58
9. "Les commencements" – 4:04
10. "Qui peut savoir" – 3:48
11. "Dis pourquoi" – 4.41
12. "Star" – 4.39
13. "Voyage, voyage" (Maxi version) – 6.41
14. "John" (Maxi version) – 6.27
15. Qui sommes-nous" (Europe remix) – 6.38

== Singles ==
- "Qui Peut Savoir" – 1986
- "Voyage, voyage" – 1986/1987 (France #2, Germany #1, UK #5 *)
- "John" – 1988 (France #5)
- "Qui Sommes-Nous?" – 1989
- "Elle Est Comme Les Étoiles" – 1990

*when originally released it charted at #53 but was re-released in 1988 as a remix by P. Hammond and P. Waterman of PWL, as the "Britmix".
