= Krister Linder =

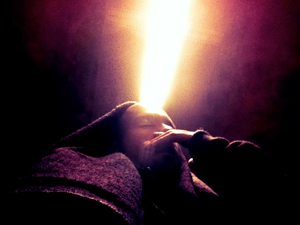
- Krister Linder - Self Portrait "Good Intentions"

Background information
- Also known as: Chris Lancelot; Yeti; Solaroid; K Tupilaq
- Born: Krister Roger Linder; 9 February 1970 (age 56)
- Origin: Stockholm, Sweden
- Genres: Electronica, trip hop, downtempo, heavy metal, film score
- Occupations: Musician, singer, producer
- Years active: 1987 -
- Labels: Sony BMG, Ghostfriend
- Website: Official website

Krister Linder is a Swedish electronic musician.

== Career ==
Krister Linder started his music career in 1987 as the vocalist of the Swedish band Grace. Their single "Ingen kan älska som vi" became a hit-single in Sweden, and was taken from the soundtrack to the teen film with Izabella Scorupco.

Under the name Chris Lancelot, he was the vocalist of the Swedish band Dive from 1990 to 1994. The duo released three albums, and their debut single, Captain Nemo, was later recorded by Sarah Brightman. Dive also recorded the songs The Ocean and A Room Full of Flowers, together with singer Stina Nordenstam.

Linder went on to compose and produce experimental electronic music until he released his first solo album as a vocalist, Songs from the Silent Years in 2006. He was also the lead vocalist in the Swedish heavy metal band Enter the Hunt, who released the album, For Life. 'Til Death. To Hell. With Love, which was produced by Jacob Hellner.

Other musical efforts include scoring for TV commercials, short movies and feature films. His score in the documentary film Gitmo: The New Rules of War (directed by Erik Gandini and Tarik Saleh) won the first prize in the category Music For TV at the Festival international Musique et Cinéma in Auxerre, France in 2006. In November 2008, he won first prize in the category Best Music at the Stockholm International Film Festival for his score to the feature film Downloading Nancy (directed by Johan Renck). In 2009, he won the Jameson Film Music Award at the Stockholm International Film Festival for the score to the animated feature film Metropia (directed by Tarik Saleh). That same year, he did co-vocals on the song "Departer" on the album Night Is the New Day by Katatonia. He also did vocals for Omnimotion's remix of the song Tierra Azul, originally by Vibrasphere. He made the music for the 2013 documentary feature, While No One Is Watching. He composed an exclusive track used for the 2016 Chanel N°5 perfume television advertisement. In 2019 Linder released his second solo album as vocalist, Across the never. Linder continued to write the music for Tarik Salehs movies, The Nile Hilton Incident and Boy from Heaven.

== Solo albums ==
- Alaskanlab Sweden 1995, 1995 (as Tupilaq)
- Holtkötter, 1996 (as Yeti)
- First Wave, 2000 (as Solaroid)
- Songs from the Silent Years, 2006
- Metropia, 2009
- The Nile Hilton Incident, 2017
- Across the never, 2019
- Boy from Heaven, 2023
