= Punish Yourself =

French industrial metal band

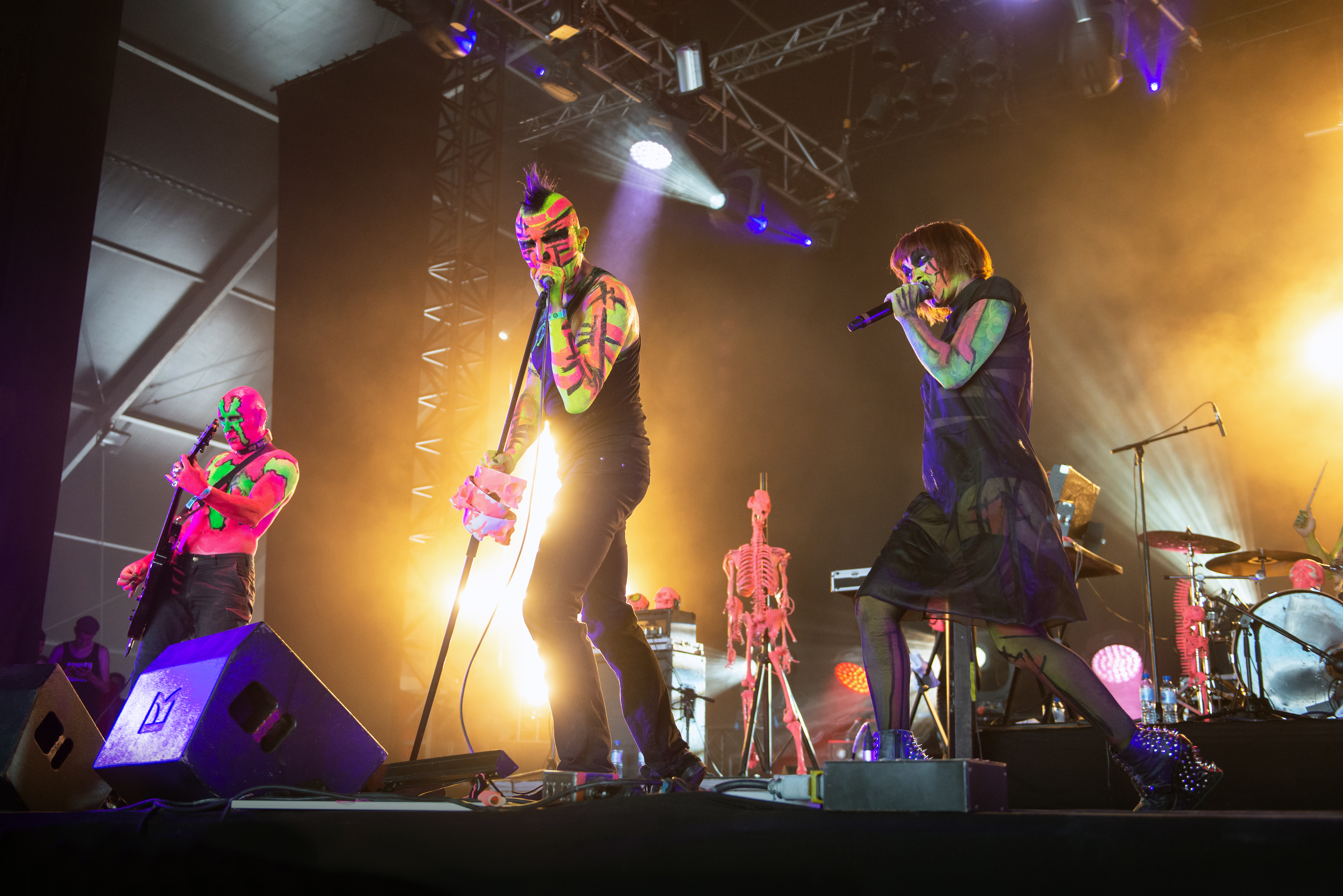
- Punish Yourself at Hellfest 2019

Background information
- Origin: Toulouse, France
- Genres: Industrial metal, punk rock, hardcore techno, dance-punk
- Years active: 1994–2023
- Labels: Season of Mist (later); Active Entertainment; Elp Records; Geisha Machine (early)
- Past members: VX 69; Miss Z; P.RLOX; X.av; Klodia
- Website: punishyourself.free.fr

Punish Yourself was a French band best known for their stage theatrics and innovative style of industrial/punk music. They describe their style as "Fluo Cyber Punk".

After lead singer Vincent Villalon confessed to his involvement in sexual assaults, the band made the clear decision to cease all activities from 2023 onwards.

== Members ==
=== Past members ===
- vx 69 (sometimes vx or Cheerleader 69; born Vincent Villalon) – vocals
- Miss Z (born Sandrine Caracci) – guitar, vocals
- P.RLOX (born Pierre-Laurent Clément) – guitar
- X.av (born Xavier Guionie) – drums
- Klodia
- Fafa/MCC (born Jean-François Clément) – dance, pyrotechnics
- Holivier Menini – guitar
- Georges Garza – drums
- Magali Arino – vocals
- Séverine Naudi – keyboards
- Frankie Lacosta – bass
- PFX68 – bass
- Stéphane Vanstaen – percussions
- Gilles Alogues – keyboards
- Bud Silva – drums
- Olga, Dollga – dance
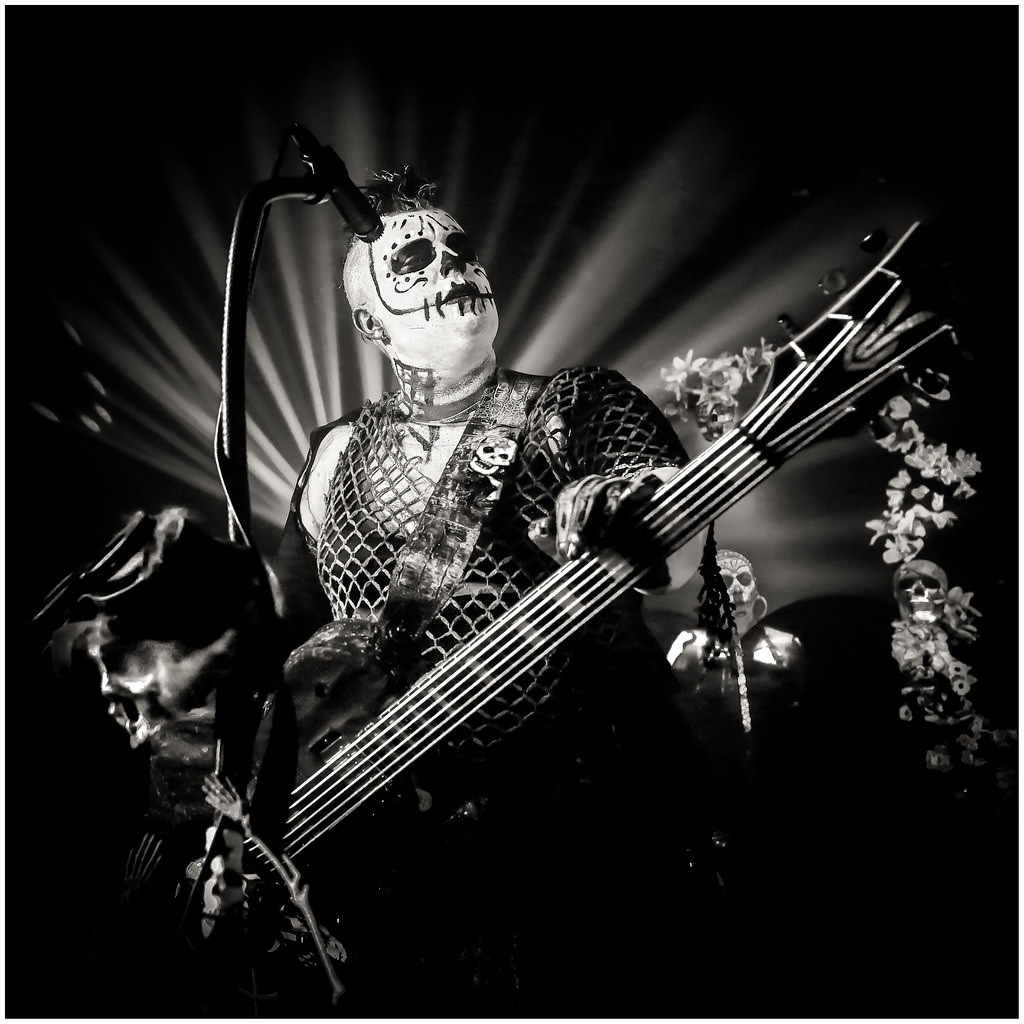
MissZ

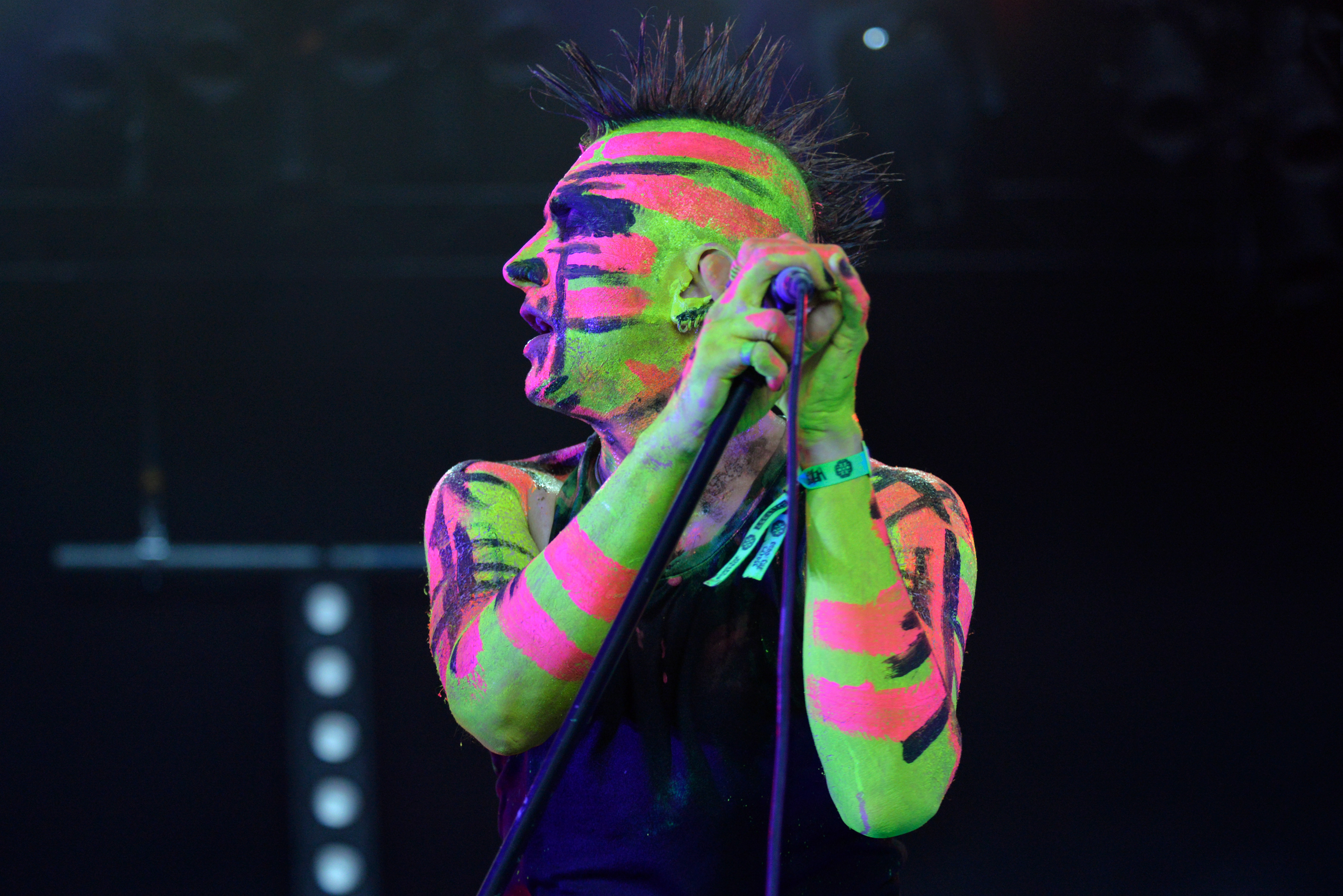
vx 69

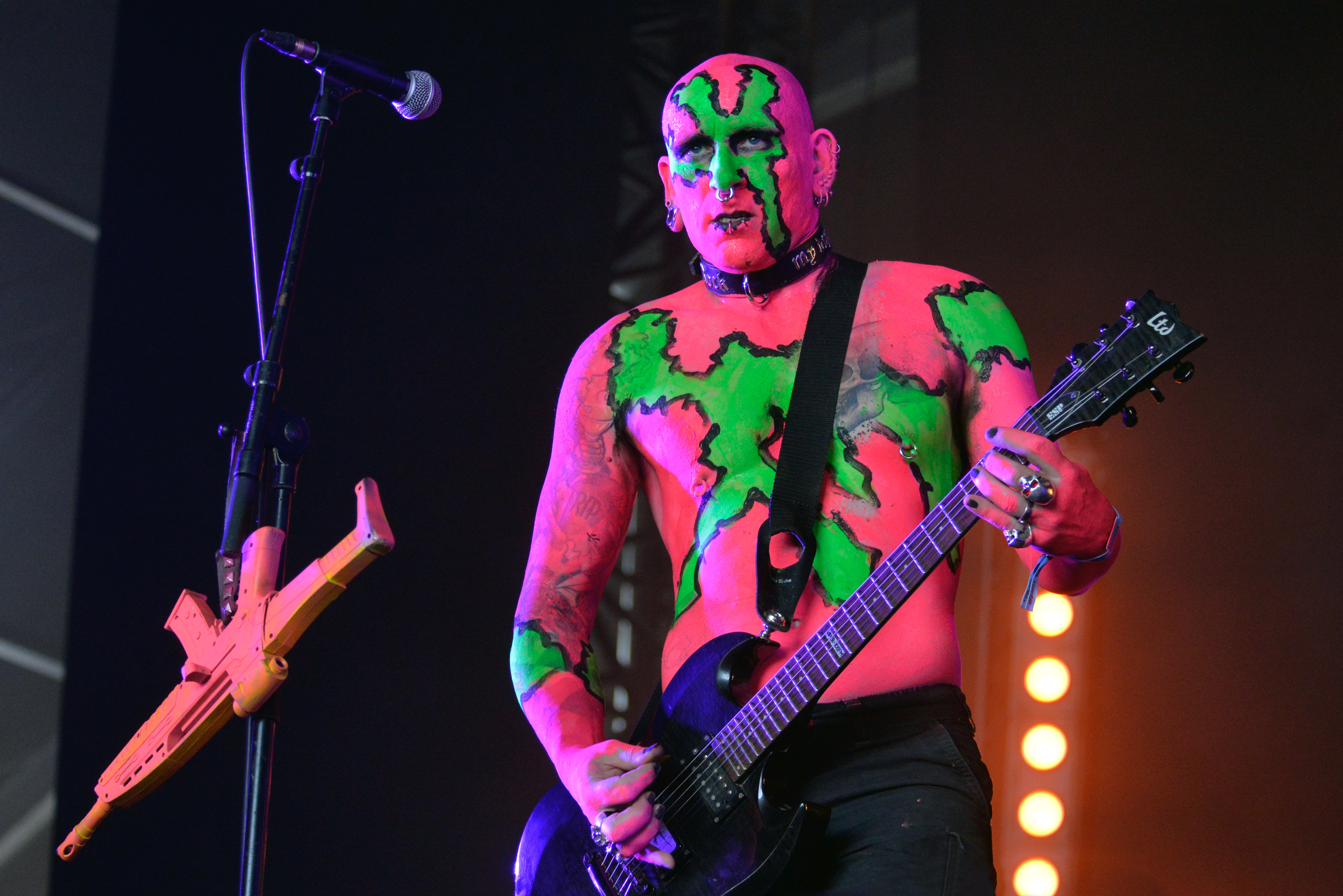
X.av

== Discography ==
Studio albums

- 1998: Feuer Tanz System
- 2001: Disco Flesh: Warp 99
- 2004: Sexplosive Locomotive
- 2007: Cult Movie (CD/DVD)
- 2008: Gore Baby Gore
- 2009: Pink Panther Party
- 2010: Punish Yourself VS Sonic Area: Phenomedia
- 2013: Holiday in Guadalajara
- 2017: Spin the Pig

Live albums

- 2003: Behind the City Lights

Compilation

- 2005: Crypt 1996–2002

Demos

- 1994: First demo tape
- 1995: Second demo tape

== Trivia ==
In 2004, pornographic actress Coralie Trinh Thi wrote a comic about them called Deep Inside Punish Yourself. In the same year, PY composed the song Holy Trinh Thi in reference to her.

== TV appearances ==
- Tracks on Arte Channel, a documentary about new punk bands.
- On Ne Peut Pas Plaire À Tout Le Monde on France 2, a talk-show/reportage about satanism in the rock and metal music.
