= Masters of Chant =

Studio album by Gregorian
- Released: 6 December 1999
- Recorded: 1999 Angel Recording Studios/London, Nemo Studios/Hamburg
- Genre: Gregorian chant, pop, rock
- Length: 71:00
- Label: Edel America Records
- Producer: Frank Peterson, Carsten Heusmann, Jan-Eric Kohrs & Michael Soltau

Gregorian chronology
Sadisfaction (1991)	Masters of Chant (1999)	Masters of Chant Chapter II (2001)

Masters of Chant is the first album of the second incarnation of Gregorian and second overall under the Gregorian name, released in 1999. It is the first in the Masters of Chant series of albums.

In 2008, Barnes & Noble/Curb Records released a Gregorian compilation album with the Masters of Chant name, containing tracks from various Masters of Chant albums.

== Track listing ==
No.	Title	Writer(s)	Original artist	Length
1.	"Brothers in Arms"	Mark Knopfler	Dire Straits	5:09
2.	"Scarborough Fair"	(Traditional)	Simon & Garfunkel	4:06
3.	"Tears in Heaven"	Eric Clapton, Will Jennings	Eric Clapton	4:43
4.	"Still I'm Sad"	Jim McCarty, Paul Samwell-Smith	The Yardbirds	4:02
5.	"When a Man Loves a Woman"	Calvin Lewis, Andrew Wright	Percy Sledge	4:08
6.	"Nothing Else Matters"	James Hetfield, Lars Ulrich	Metallica	5:30
7.	"Fade to Grey"	Billy Currie, Christopher John Payne, Midge Ure	Visage	3:38
8.	"Losing My Religion"	Bill Berry, Peter Buck, Mike Mills, Michael Stipe	R.E.M.	5:01
9.	"Vienna"	Midge Ure, Billy Currie, Chris Cross, Warren Cann	Ultravox	4:22
10.	"The Sound of Silence"	Paul Simon	Simon & Garfunkel	3:35
11.	"Sebastian"	Steve Harley	Steve Harley & Cockney Rebel	3:05
12.	"Don't Give Up" (featuring Sarah Brightman)	Peter Gabriel	Peter Gabriel & Kate Bush	5:22
Total length:				52:41

Re-release bonus track
No.	Title	Writer(s)	Original artist	Length
13.	"Save a Prayer"	Duran Duran	Duran Duran	4:14
14.	"I Still Haven't Found What I'm Looking For" (Radio edit)	Bono	U2	4:54
15.	"Make Us One"	Cindy Morgan, Michael W. Smith	Cindy Morgan	3:15
16.	"Breathe"	Leigh Nash, Michelle Tumes, John M. Mallory	Sixpence None the Richer	3:53

Limited repackaged edition
No.	Title	Writer(s)	Original artist	Length
13.	"I Still Haven't Found What I'm Looking For" (Radio edit)	Bono	U2	4:54
14.	"Save a Prayer"	Duran Duran	Duran Duran	4:14

Chants & Mysteries (Box Set), 2007, Disc 1
No.	Title	Writer(s)	Original artist	Length
13.	"Save a Prayer"	Duran Duran	Duran Duran	4:14
14.	"I Still Haven't Found What I'm Looking For" (Radio edit)	Bono	U2	4:54

== Charts ==
=== Weekly charts ===
Chart (1999–2001)	Peak position
Australian Albums (ARIA)	14
Belgian Albums (Ultratop Flanders)	10
Belgian Albums (Ultratop Wallonia)	13
Danish Albums (Hitlisten)	33
Dutch Albums (Album Top 100)	10
Finnish Albums (Suomen virallinen lista)	4
French Albums (SNEP)	11
German Albums (Offizielle Top 100)	38
Hungarian Albums (MAHASZ)	4
New Zealand Albums (RMNZ)	7
Norwegian Albums (VG-lista)	5
Polish Albums (ZPAV)	45
Swedish Albums (Sverigetopplistan)	11
Swiss Albums (Schweizer Hitparade)	38

=== Year-end charts ===
Chart (2000)	Position
German Albums (Offizielle Top 100)	93

== Certifications ==
Region	Certification	Certified units/sales
Australia (ARIA)	Gold	35,000^{^}
Belgium (BRMA)	Gold	25,000^{*}
Finland (Musiikkituottajat)	Gold	33,258
France (SNEP)	Gold	100,000^{*}
Germany (BVMI)	Gold	150,000^{^}
Hungary (MAHASZ)	Gold	
New Zealand (RMNZ)	Gold	7,500^{^}
Poland (ZPAV)	Gold	50,000^{*}
^{*} Sales figures based on certification alone.^{^} Shipments figures based on certification alone.
