= Gregorian (band) =

German musical band

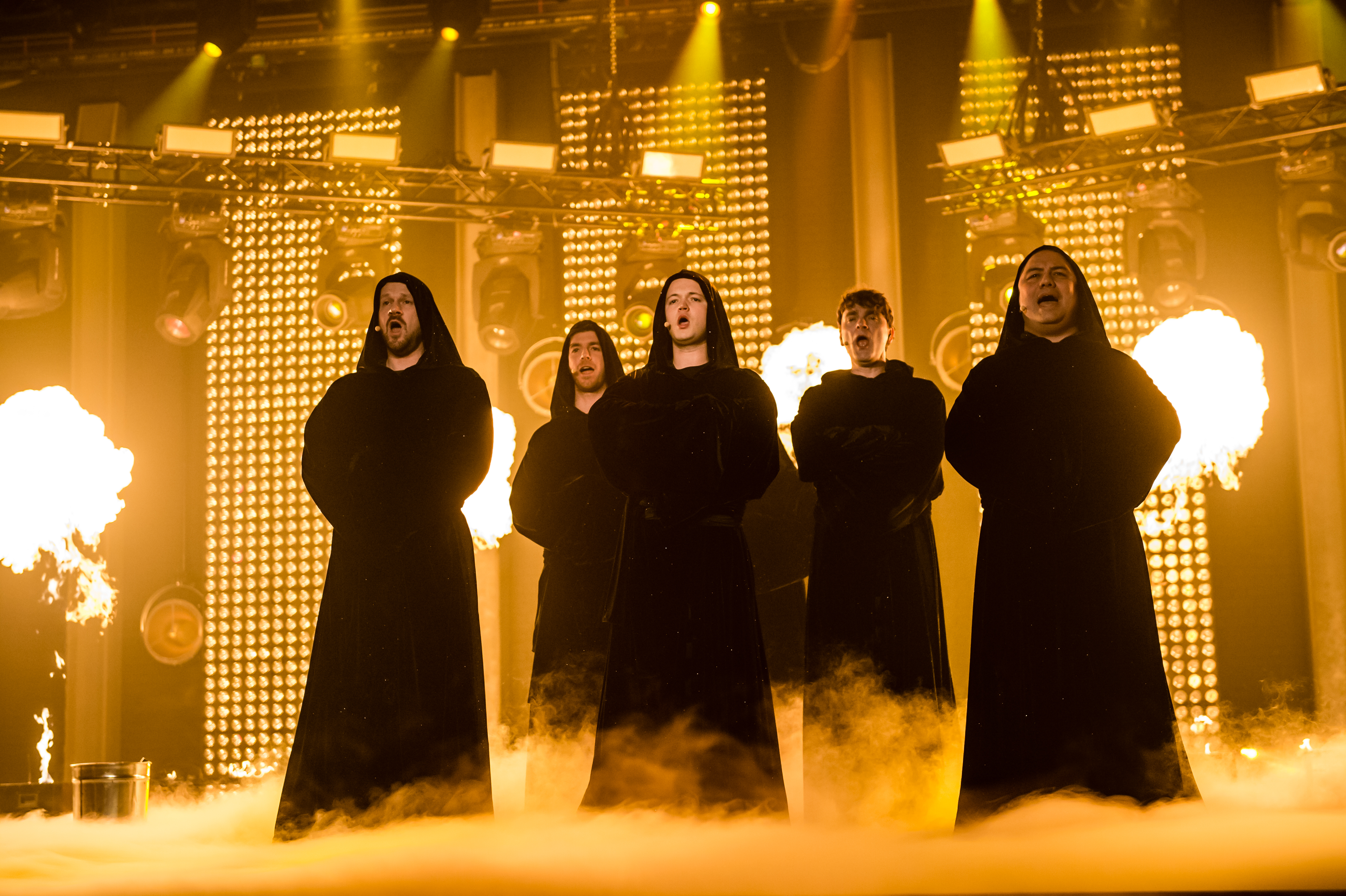
- Gregorian at the 2016 Unser Lied für Stockholm

Background information
- Origin: Germany
- Genres: Gregorian chant; new-age; crossover; symphonic rock
- Years active: 1991; 1998–present
- Label: Edel
- Members: Frank Peterson; Amelia Brightman; Eva Mali (Zarina Maliti); Richard Naxton; Johnny Clucas; Chris Tickner; David Tilley; Gerry O'Beirne; Lawrence White; Rob Fardell; Daniel Williams; Ted Hands; Brendan Matthew; Ashley Turnell; Miles Horner
- Past members: Matthias Meissner (initial project); Thomas Schwarz (initial project)
- Website: gregorian.de

Gregorian is a German band headed by Frank Peterson that performs Gregorian chant-inspired versions of modern pop and rock songs. The band features both vocal harmony and instrumental accompaniment. They competed in Unser Lied für Stockholm, the German national selection for the Eurovision Song Contest 2016, and placed 5th in the first round of public voting with the song "Masters of Chant", failing to make the Top 3 with 9.06% of the public vote.

== Band history ==
Originally, Gregorian was conceived as a more pop-oriented group in the vein of Enigma. Under this concept, Peterson together with Matthias Meissner and Thomas Schwarz, recorded the 1991 album Sadisfaction, with lead vocals provided by the Sisters of Oz: Susana Espelleta (Peterson's wife at the time) and Birgit Freud. However, this was the only album by the trio in that style.

In 1998, Peterson and his team of Jan-Eric Kohrs, Michael Soltau, and Carsten Heusmann re-invented the project to perform popular songs in the Gregorian style. The criteria for song selection were strict; in order to be considered, a song needed to be translatable into the 7-tone scale. For each album, songs were carefully chosen in addition to original songs written by Jan-Eric Kohrs, Amelia Brightman, and Carsten Heussman. Twelve vocalists - previously acclaimed session and choir singers - were then hired to record the tracks.

Each Gregorian album was initially digitally tracked at Nemo Studios, Peterson's Hamburg studio. The vocalists then recorded their parts in a church atmosphere with dimmed lights and candles, in order to escape what Peterson referred to in a 2001 interview as the "cold and technical" studio atmosphere.

The concept proved to be successful, and the group proceeded to record several more albums in the same style as Masters of Chant. Known as the ten "Chapters", said album releases primarily featured covers of well-known or popular songs (e.g., Phil Collins' "In the Air Tonight", Alphaville's "Forever Young"; Celine Dion's "My Heart Will Go On", etc.) done in the group's chant-inspired style, though occasionally the group released original compositions as well. Their 2004 album, The Dark Side, was a slight departure from the others, featuring a darker repertoire; similarly, the group has released themed albums such as the Christmas-themed Christmas Chants, another dark-repertoire album with The Dark Side of the Chant (2010), and the themed Epic Chants (2012). In 2005, The Masterpieces, a compilation album accompanied by a live DVD, was released.

=== Tours ===
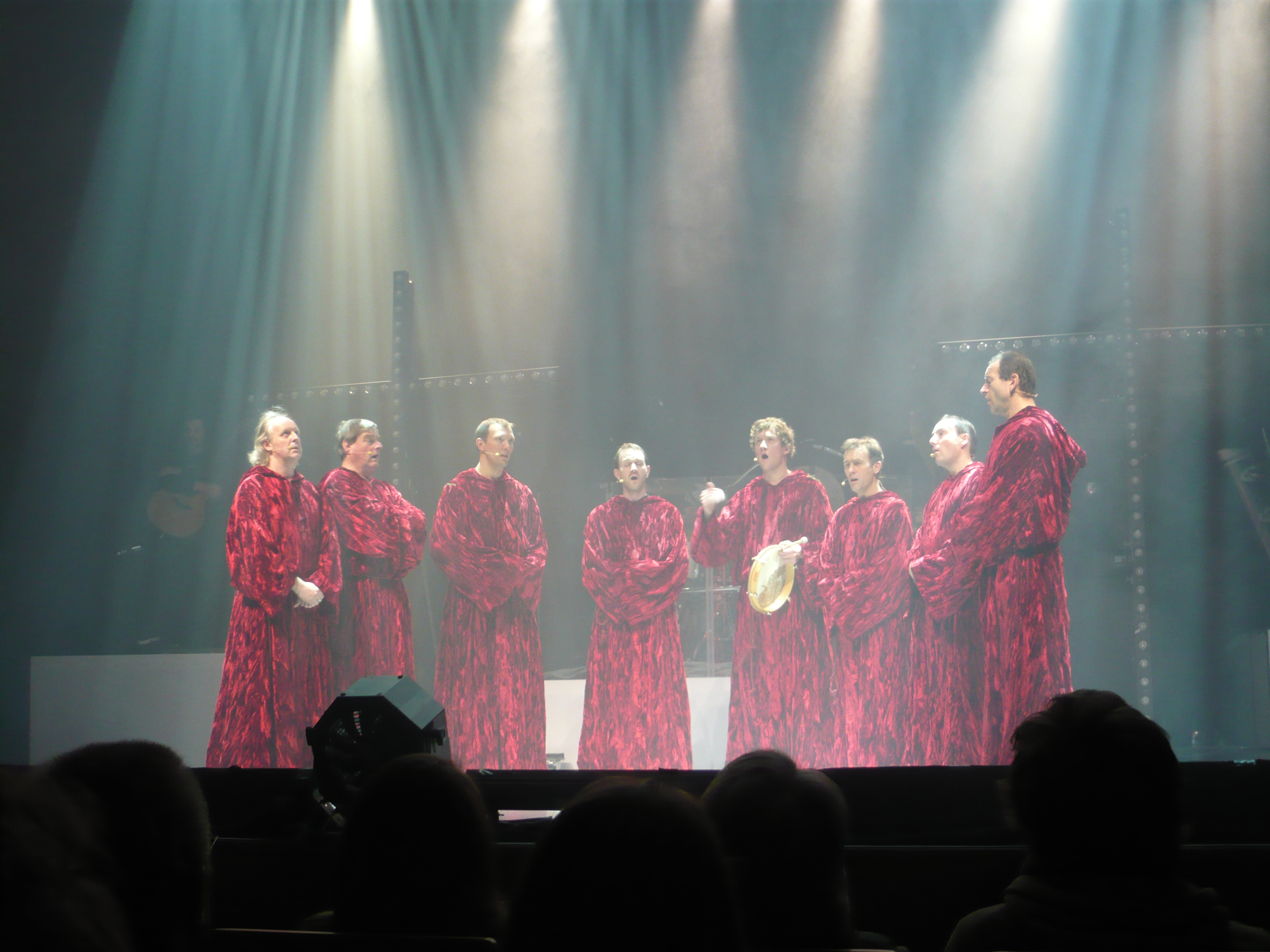
Gregorian in 2009

Gregorian has toured parts of Europe, China, Russia, and Japan. According to one report, the band has performed over 3,000 concerts in 106 countries to 12 million fans. Live concert DVDs have also been released.

== Discography ==
Gregorian has released ten albums in their Masters of Chant series and a number of other albums, including a Christmas album and several compilations. They have also released two types of video album; live concerts and music video albums featuring the singers in various surroundings.

=== Initial project ===
- 1991: Sadisfaction (album)
- 1991: "So Sad" (single)
- 1991: "Once in a Lifetime" (single)

=== Masters of Chant albums ===
- 1999: Masters of Chant
- 2001: Masters of Chant Chapter II
- 2002: Masters of Chant Chapter III
- 2003: Masters of Chant Chapter IV
- 2004: The Dark Side (called Masters of Chant V in Oceania but distinct from the 2006 album of that name)
- 2006: Masters of Chant Chapter V
- 2007: Masters of Chant Chapter VI
- 2009: Masters of Chant Chapter VII
- 2010: Dark Side of the Chant
- 2011: Masters of Chant Chapter VIII
- 2012: Epic Chants
- 2013: Masters of Chant Chapter IX
- 2014: Winter Chants
- 2015: Masters of Chant X: The Final Chapter
- 2017: Holy Chants
- 2021: Pure Chants
- 2022: Pure Chants II

=== Other albums/compilations ===
- 2005: The Masterpieces (Best of CD and live DVD)
- 2006: Christmas Chants
- 2007: Masters of Chant (Curb Records)
- 2011: Best of 1990–2010
- 2016: Live! Masters of Chant – Final Chapter Tour
- 2017: Masters of Chant – The Platinum Collection
- 2019: 20/2020
- 2024: 25/2025

=== Singles ===
- "Masters of Chant" (1999)
- "I Still Haven't Found What I'm Looking For" (2000)
- "Losing My Religion" (2000)
- "Moment of Peace" (2001)
- "Voyage Voyage" (2001)
- "Join Me" (2002)
- "The Gift" (2003)
- "Angels" (2003)
- "Where the Wild Roses Grow" (2004)
- "O Fortuna" (2010)

=== Video albums ===
- 2001: Masters of Chant in Santiago de Compostela
- 2001: Moments of Peace in Ireland
- 2002: Masters of Chant Chapter III
- 2003: Gold Edition
- 2005: The Masterpieces
- 2007: Masters of Chant: Live at Kreuzenstein Castle
- 2008: Christmas Chants & Visions
- 2011: Masters of Chant Chapter 8 (Gregorian Live in Europe 2011: The Dark Side of the Chant) – Limited Edition (CD & DVD)
- 2012: Epic Chants "Dark Side of the Chants Live in Zagreb" – Limited Edition (CD & DVD)
- 2013: Epic Chants Tour 2013 "Live in Belgrade" – Deluxe Edition (CD & DVD)
- 2016: Masters of Chant – Final Chapter Tour (CD & DVD, blu-ray) (Limited Fan Edition including 4 additional music videos and the complete concert on double CD)
