= Masters of Chant Chapter III =

Studio album by Gregorian
- Released: October 7, 2002
- Recorded: 2002 Angel Recording Studios/London, Vox Klangstudio/Bendestorf
- Genre: Gregorian chant
- Label: Edel Records
- Producer: Carsten Heusmann, Jan-Eric Kohrs & Michael Soltau

Gregorian chronology
Masters of Chant Chapter II (2001)	Masters of Chant Chapter III (2002)	Masters of Chant Chapter IV (2003)

Masters of Chant III is the fourth album by Gregorian.

== Track listing ==
No.	Title	Writer(s)	Original artist	Length
1.	"Join Me" (featuring Sarah Brightman (as Hepsibah))	Ville Valo	HIM	4:10
2.	"Be"	Neil Diamond	Neil Diamond	5:20
3.	"Blasphemous Rumours"	Martin Gore	Depeche Mode	4:07
4.	"Only You"	Vince Clarke	Yazoo	3:52
5.	"Blue Monday"	New Order	New Order	3:24
6.	"Sacrifice"	Bernie Taupin, Elton John	Elton John	4:27
7.	"Ordinary World"	Duran Duran	Duran Duran	5:46
8.	"Fields of Gold"	Sting	Sting	3:31
9.	"Before the Dawn"	Amelia Brightman, Carsten Heusmann, Jan-Eric Kohrs		4:06
10.	"I Won't Hold You Back"	Steve Lukather	Toto	4:56
11.	"Wicked Game"	Chris Isaak	Chris Isaak	5:10
12.	"Out of the Cold"	Amelia Brightman, Carsten Heusmann, Jan-Eric Kohrs		3:52
13.	"Join Me (Schill Out Version)" (featuring Sarah Brightman (as Hepsibah))	Ville Valo		4:14

Bonus tracks

- "Voyage Voyage 2002" (featuring Amelia Brightman)
- "Ouragan" (Romano Musumarra) (original by Princess Stéphanie of Monaco)
- "Juste Quelques Hommes" (Jean-Jacques Goldman) (original by Jean-Jacques Goldman)

== Production ==
- Producer – Carsten Heusmann, Jan-Eric Kohrs, and Michael Soltau
- Engineer – Volker Heintzen and John Timperly
- Assistant Engineer – Tom Jenkins
- Mixing – Jan-Eric Kohrs, Carsten Heusmann, and Michael Soltau

== Personnel ==
=== Vocals ===
- Richard "Naxos" Naxton, Johnny Clucas, Dan Hoadley, Chris Tickner, Richard Collier, Gerry O'Beime, Gunther Laudahn, Lawrence "Lorro" White, Jan-Eric Kohrs, Rob Fardell
- Voyage Voyage (original version) by Sarah Brightman
- Voyage Voyage 2002 by Amelia Brightman

=== Musicians ===
- Keyboards, Programming, Arrangements – Carsten Heusmann, Jan-Eric Kohrs, and Michael Soltau
- Guitars – Gunther Laudahn and Peter Weihe
- Strings Arranger and Conductor – Stefan Pintev

== Charts ==
Chart (2003)	Peak position
Hungarian Albums (MAHASZ)	14

== Certifications and sales ==
Region	Certification	Certified units/sales
Finland (Musiikkituottajat)	Gold	21,538
