= Masters of Chant Chapter VI =

Studio album by Gregorian
- Released: 28 September 2007
- Recorded: 2007 Angel Studio/London, Nemo Studios/Hamburg, Vox Klangstudio/Bendestorf
- Genre: Gregorian chant
- Label: Edel Music

Gregorian chronology
Christmas Chants (2006)	Masters of Chant Chapter VI (2007)	Masters of Chant Chapter VII (2009)

Masters of Chant Chapter VI is the ninth album by German band Gregorian. It was released on 28 September 2007.

== Track listing ==
1. "Guide Me God" (Sinéad O'Connor)
2. "Miracle of Love" (Eurythmics)
3. "Dreams" (Fleetwood Mac)
4. "The Circle" (featuring Amelia Brightman)
5. "Mad World" (Tears for Fears)
6. "Mercy Street" (Peter Gabriel)
7. "Believe in Me" (Lenny Kravitz)
8. "One of Us" (Joan Osborne)
9. "Who Wants to Live Forever" (Queen)
10. "Crying in the Rain" (The Everly Brothers)
11. "Greensleeves" (Traditional)
12. "Jóga" (featuring Amelia Brightman) (Björk)
13. "The Time Has Come" (featuring Amelia Brightman)
14. "Fix You" (featuring Amelia Brightman) (Coldplay)
