= Sadisfaction =

Studio album by Gregorian
- Released: 10 November 1991
- Recorded: 1991
- Genre: Pop
- Label: Metronome Musik GmbH
- Producer: Frank Peterson

Gregorian chronology
| Sadisfaction (1991) | Masters of Chant (1999) |

Sadisfaction is the debut studio album by the German musical project Gregorian, released in 1991. It spawned two singles: "So Sad" and "Once in a Lifetime", with "So Sad" reaching number one in Portugal.

The album was recorded by Frank Peterson, Matthias Meissner, and Thomas Schwarz, with lead vocals provided by the Sisters of Oz: Susana Espelleta and Birgit Freud.

== Track listing ==
1. "Watcha Gonna Do" (F. Gregorian, Wehr) – 4:04
2. "Once in a Lifetime" (F. Gregorian, Schwarz, Meissner) – 4:09 sample
3. "So Sad" (F. Gregorian) – 3:36
4. "Forever" (F. Gregorian, Wehr, Hagel) – 3:08
5. "The Quiet Self" (F. Gregorian) – 5:29
6. "Reflect" (F. Gregorian) – 2:53
7. "Monastry" (F. Gregorian) – 3:19
8. "Gonna Make You Mine" (Shwarz, F. Gregorian, Meissner) – 3:16
9. "You Take My Breath Away" (F. Gregorian) – 4:26
10. "I Love You" (Schwarz, F. Gregorian, Meissner) – 3:29
11. "Why Did You Go (I Feel Sad)" (Wehr, Hagel) – 3:45
12. "The Mission" (Wehr) – 3:15
13. "Depressions" (F. Gregorian) – 2:59
