= Masters of Chant Chapter V =

Studio album by Gregorian
- Released: March 31, 2006
- Recorded: Late 2005 - early 2006; Angel Studio/London; Nemo Studios/Hamburg; Wunderkind Studio/Hamburg; Protone Studio/Hamburg; Proloton Studio/Norderstedt; Vox Klangstudio/Bendestorf
- Genre: Gregorian chant
- Length: 72:12
- Label: Edel America Records

Gregorian chronology
The Dark Side (2004)	Masters of Chant Chapter V (2006)	Christmas Chants (2006)

Masters of Chant Chapter V is the seventh album by German band Gregorian. It was released on March 31, 2006.

Note: Gregorian's album The Dark Side was also released in Oceania under the name Masters of Chant V. Aside from the title change, the Oceanic release is The Dark Side with the addition of the track Engel.

== Track listing ==
1. "Heroes" (featuring Sarah Brightman (as Hepsibah)) (David Bowie) (5:35)
2. "Comfortably Numb" (Pink Floyd) (7:55)
3. "Send Me an Angel" (featuring Sarah Brightman (as Hepsibah)) (Real Life) (4:55)
4. "Silent Lucidity" (featuring Amelia Brightman (as Violet)) (Queensrÿche) (6:19)
5. "Lady in Black" (Uriah Heep) (5:56)
6. "The Forest" (5:08)
7. "A Weakened Soul" (featuring Amelia Brightman (as Violet)) (5:17)
8. "Lucky Man" (Emerson, Lake & Palmer) (5:22)
9. "Stop Crying Your Heart Out" (Oasis) (5:16)
10. "We Love You" (The Rolling Stones) (4:49)
11. "Boulevard of Broken Dreams" (Green Day) (5:13)
12. "The Unforgiven" (Metallica) (7:40)
13. "I Feel Free" (Cream) (3:38)
