= More (The Sisters of Mercy song) =

1990 single by the Sisters of Mercy

Single by the Sisters of Mercy

from the album Vision Thing
- B-side: "You Could Be the One"
- Released: 1 October 1990
- Length: 8:21 (album version); 4:44 (single edit)
- Label: Merciful Release
- Songwriters: Andrew Eldritch; Jim Steinman
- Producers: Andrew Eldritch; Jim Steinman

The Sisters of Mercy singles chronology
"Lucretia My Reflection" (1988)	"More" (1990)	"Doctor Jeep" (1990)
- Audio on YouTube

"More" is a song by English rock band the Sisters of Mercy, released in 1990 as the first single from their third album Vision Thing. It reached No. 1 on the US Billboard Modern Rock Tracks chart for five weeks and entered the top 20 in Germany, Ireland and the United Kingdom. The song was co-written and co-produced by Andrew Eldritch and Jim Steinman.

In September 2023, for the 35th anniversary of Modern Rock Tracks (which by then had been renamed to Alternative Airplay), Billboard ranked "More" at number 96 on its list of the 100 most successful songs in the chart's history.

== Reception ==
AllMusic writer Dave Thompson calls "More" among the most dramatic songs of its time and notes "the key to the song is a chorus that simply soars on gutter gospel backing vocals."

Consequence was less positive, using the song as an example of the Sisters of Mercy not seeing their full potential, calling it "not one of their best singles" and "not very good in any context."

== Track listings ==
7-inch: Merciful Release / MR47

No.	Title	Writer(s)	Length
1.	"More"	Andrew Eldritch, Jim Steinman	4:44
2.	"You Could Be the One"	Andrew Eldritch, Andreas Bruhn	3:59

12-inch: Merciful Release / MR47T

No.	Title	Writer(s)	Length
1.	"More (extended version)"	Andrew Eldritch, Jim Steinman	8:30
2.	"You Could Be the One"	Andrew Eldritch, Andreas Bruhn	3:59

CD: Merciful Release / MR47CD

No.	Title	Writer(s)	Length
1.	"More"	Andrew Eldritch, Jim Steinman	4:37
2.	"More (extended version)"	Andrew Eldritch, Jim Steinman	8:30
3.	"You Could Be the One"	Andrew Eldritch, Andreas Bruhn	3:59

== Charts ==
Chart (1990–1991)	Peak position
Australia (ARIA)	74
Europe (Eurochart Hot 100)	39
Germany (GfK)	14
Ireland (IRMA)	10
New Zealand (Recorded Music NZ)	41
UK Singles (Official Charts)	14
US Alternative Airplay (Billboard)	1

== See also ==
- List of Billboard Modern Rock Tracks number ones of the 1990s
