= Metropia (film) =

- Theatrical release poster
- Directed by: Tarik Saleh
- Screenplay by: Tarik Saleh; Stig Larsson; Fredrik Edin
- Story by: Tarik Saleh; Fredrik Edin; Martin Hultman
- Produced by: Kristina Åberg
- Starring: Vincent Gallo; Stellan Skarsgård; Udo Kier; Alexander Skarsgård; Juliette Lewis
- Cinematography: Sesse Lind
- Edited by: Johan Söderberg
- Music by: Krister Linder
- Production companies: Atmo Media Network; Zentropa Entertainments
- Distributed by: Sandrew Metronome
- Release dates: 2 September 2009 (Venice Film Festival); 27 November 2009 (Sweden)
- Running time: 86 minutes
- Countries: Sweden; Denmark; Norway
- Language: English
- Budget: 34 million SEK
- Box office: 32 million SEK

Metropia is a 2009 English-language adult animated science fiction film directed by Tarik Saleh. The screenplay was written by Fredrik Edin, Stig Larsson, and Tarik Saleh after a story by Tarik Saleh, Fredrik Edin and Martin Hultman. The film uses a technique where photographs have been altered and heavily stylized in a computer program, and then animated. The visual style is inspired by the works of Terry Gilliam, Roy Andersson and Yuri Norstein.

Metropia was co-produced by Atmo Media Network and Lars von Trier's Danish production company Zentropa Entertainments, premiered at the 66th Venice International Film Festival, and opened in Sweden on 27 November 2009.

== Plot ==
In a future Europe the world is running out of oil. A gigantic underground network is created by joining all the undergrounds together beneath Europe. Roger (Vincent Gallo), from a suburb of Stockholm, avoids the underground because he finds it disturbing. Sometimes when he is too near the underground he hears a strange voice in his head. One day Roger stumbles upon the truth that his life is controlled in every detail. Trexx, the company that runs the mammoth European rail network, has found a way to read and control minds using the dandruff shampoo "Dangst", with the goal of creating a highly efficient advertising system. In order to break free, Roger joins forces with supermodel Nina (Juliette Lewis), the former model and spokeswoman for Dangst.

== Cast ==
- Vincent Gallo as Roger
- Juliette Lewis as Nina
- Udo Kier as Ivan Bahn
- Stellan Skarsgård as Ralph Parker
- Alexander Skarsgård as Stefan
- Sofia Helin as Anna
- Shanti Roney as Karl
- Fares Fares as Firaz
- Joanna Zofia Bard Mikolajczyk as metro voice
- Goran Marjanovic as asylum seeker
- Magnus Skogberg Tear as Roger's boss
- Lotta Bromé as news anchor
- Annelie Persson as Trexx Commercial
- Indiana Neidell as Wayne Marshal

== Production ==
The story and supporting material were developed by Stockholm-based Atmo during a period of four years before the actual animation work had begun. Co-producers include Denmark's Zentropa and Norway's Tordenfilm, and with support from the Council of Europe's film fund Eurimages, the film had a budget of around 34 million SEK. Ordinary people spotted on the streets were used as models for the characters. The main character Roger is based on a chef who worked at a restaurant in Stockholm where the Atmo employees were regulars, and Nina was found in a make-up store. Vincent Gallo accepted his part as the lead voice actor after having seen 30 seconds of finished animation as well as hearing that German actor Udo Kier, of whom Gallo was a fan, already was attached to the project. After a story board had been developed, photographer Sesse Lind travelled around Europe and took pictures of needed locations in Stockholm, Berlin, Paris and Copenhagen. The photographs were edited in Photoshop and animated in Adobe After Effects under lead animator Isak Gjertsen. Animation was done in Trollhättan as the first production to use Film i Väst's newly started animation studio. The production took two years to finish.

== Release ==
The film premiered on 2 September 2009 at the Venice Film Festival, opening up the festival's Critic's Week but shown out of competition.

== Awards ==
Association	Award	Category	Nominee	Result
Annecy International Animated Film Festival 2010	Cristal	Best Feature	Tarik Saleh	Nominated
Gothenburg Film Festival 2010	Lorens Award		Kristina Åberg	Won
Nordic Council 2010	Nordic Council's Film Prize		Tarik Saleh (director, script writer); Stig Larsson (script writer); Fredrik Edin (script writer); Kristina Åberg (producer)	Nominated
Sitges - Catalan International Film Festival 2009		Best Film	Tarik Saleh	Nominated
São Paulo International Film Festival 2009	International Jury Award	Best Feature Film	Tarik Saleh	Nominated
66th Venice International Film Festival	Future Film Festival Digital Award		Tarik Saleh	Won
Warsaw International Film Festival 2009	Grand Prix		Tarik Saleh	Nominated
Stockholm Film Festival 2009		Best Music	Krister Linder	Won
Stockholm Film Festival 2009	Bronze Horse		Tarik Saleh	Nominated
