= Moment of Peace =

2001 single by Gregorian

Single by Gregorian

from the album Masters of Chant Chapter II
- Released: 2001
- Genre: Gregorian chant; new age
- Length: 4:01
- Label: Edel AG
- Songwriter(s): Carsten Heusmann; Amelia Brightman
- Producer(s): Jan-Eric Kohrs; Carsten Heusmann; Michael Soltau

Gregorian singles chronology
"Losing My Religion" (2000)	"Moment of Peace" (2001)	"Voyage Voyage" (2001)

Music video
- "Moment of Peace" on YouTube

"Moment of Peace" is a song by the German Gregorian chant band Gregorian featuring English singer Sarah Brightman. It was released in 2001 on Edel AG as the only single from their third studio album, Masters of Chant Chapter II (2001) of which it is the opening track. It is a Gregorian chant and new age song that was written by Amelia Brightman and Carsten Heusmann and produced by the latter and by Jan-Eric Kohrs and Michael Soltau. The Facebook page for the Gregorian band has an unpublished, multilingual version of the song uploaded by Markus Zöllner in 2014.

== Track listing ==
Germany CD maxi single
No.	Title	Writer(s)	Original artist	Length
1.	"Moment of Peace" (feat. Sarah Brightman)	Carsten Heusmann; Amelia Brightman	Gregorian	3:59
2.	"Bonny Portmore"	Celtic traditional	—	3:38
3.	"Breath"	John Mallory; Leigh Nash; Michelle Tumes	Sixpence None the Richer	3:52

Germany promo CD single
No.	Title	Writer(s)	Original artist	Length
1.	"Moment of Peace"	Carsten Heusmann; Amelia Brightman	Gregorian	3:57
2.	"Hymn"	John Lees	Barclay James Harvest	5:03

== Charts ==
Chart (2001)	Peak position
Germany (GfK)	87
