= Desireless =

French singer

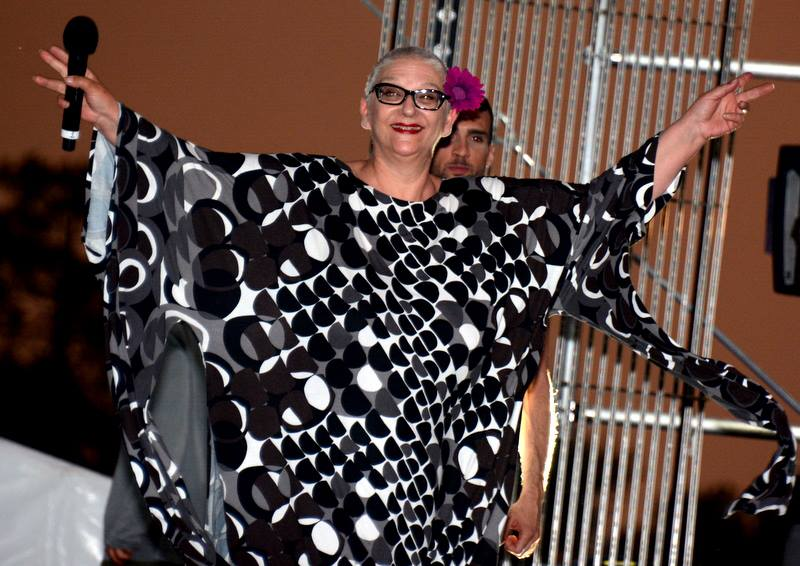
- Desireless performing in 2013

Background information
- Born: Claudie Fritsch-Mentrop; 25 December 1952 (age 73); Paris, France
- Genres: Pop; synth-pop; Euro disco
- Occupation: Singer
- Years active: 1986–present
- Labels: CBS Discos; Epic; CBS; Choice of Music; Columbia; Sony Music; Urgence Disk
- Website: www.desireless.net

Claudie Fritsch-Mentrop (born 25 December 1952), known by her stage name Desireless, is a French singer. She gained international recognition between 1986 and 1988 with her hit single, "Voyage, voyage", which topped music charts in multiple countries. The music video, directed by Bettina Rheims, features Desireless in a cold, androgynous style, reminiscent of other contemporary female artists such as Annie Lennox and Grace Jones.

According to her official website, Desireless still releases new albums and performs live, and she released a new album with Operation of the Sun (Antoine Aureche) accompanied by a worldwide tour from 2012 onward.

== Discography ==
=== Albums ===
- François (1989) France
- I Love You (1994) France
- Ses plus grands succès (2003) France & (2004) Russia
- Un Brin de Paille (2004) France
- More Love and Good Vibrations (2007) France & (2008) Russia
- Le Petit Bisou (2009) France
- More Love and Good Vibrations: Special Edition (2010) France
- L'Oeuf Du Dragon (2013, feat Antoine Aureche a.k.a. Operation of the Sun) France
- Noun (2014, feat Antoine Aureche a.k.a. Operation of the Sun) France
- 2011–2015 (2015, 'best of' feat Antoine Aureche a.k.a. Operation of the Sun) France
- Desireless chante Apollinaire (2017, feat Antoine Aureche a.k.a. Valfeu) France

=== EP ===
- L'expérience Humaine (2011) EP
- L'Oeuf Du Dragon (2012, feat Antoine Aureche a.k.a. Operation of the Sun) EP
- XP2 (2012) EP
- Nexus (2014, remixes & covers, feat Antoine Aureche a.k.a. Operation of the Sun) EP
- Un Seul Peuple (2014) EP

=== Singles ===
From François:

- 1986/87: "Voyage, voyage" (#2 France, #1 Germany, #1 Austria, #1 Belgium, #1 Denmark, #1 Spain, #1 Greece, #1 Israel, #26 Italy, #1 Lebanon, #1 Norway, #3 Canada, #11 Netherlands, #53 United Kingdom 1987 release and #5 1988 remix release, #11 Sweden, #4 Switzerland, #1 Thailand, #1 Yugoslavia)
- 1988: "John" (#5 France, #37 Germany, #92 UK)
- 1989: "Qui sommes-nous?" (#41 Canada, #88 Germany)
- 1990: "Elle est comme les étoiles"

From I Love You:

- 1994: "Il dort"
- 1994: "I Love You"

From More Love and Good Vibrations:

- 2004: "La vie est belle"
- 2010: "Voyage, Voyage (Dj Esteban Remix 2010)" (#81 French Club Charts)
