= Masters of Chant Chapter VII =

Studio album by Gregorian
- Released: 25 September 2009
- Genre: Gregorian chant
- Label: Edel Music

Gregorian chronology
Masters of Chant Chapter VI (2007)	Masters of Chant Chapter VII (2009)	Masters of Chant Chapter VIII (2011)

Masters of Chant Chapter VII is the tenth album by Gregorian. The album was released September 25, 2009.

== Track listing ==
No.	Title	Length
1.	"Meadows of Heaven" (Nightwish cover)
2.	"One" (U2 cover)
3.	"It Will Be Forgiven"
4.	"Sweet Child o' Mine" (Guns N' Roses cover)
5.	"A Face in the Crowd" (Tom Petty)"
6.	"The Carpet Crawlers" (Genesis)"
7.	"Arrival" (ABBA)"
8.	"Enjoy the Silence" (Depeche Mode)"
9.	"A Whiter Shade of Pale" (Procol Harum)"
10.	"Running Up that Hill" (Kate Bush)"
11.	"Molly Ban" (Irish traditional music)"
12.	"Kashmir" (Led Zeppelin)"
13.	"Chasing Cars" (Snow Patrol)"
14.	""Don't Leave Me Now" (Supertramp)"
