= Masters of Chant Chapter VIII =

Studio album by Gregorian
- Released: 30 September 2011
- Genre: Gregorian chant
- Label: Edel Music

Gregorian chronology
Masters of Chant Chapter VII (2009)	Masters of Chant Chapter VIII (2011)

Masters of Chant Chapter VIII is the eleventh album of band of Gregorian which was released on 30 September 2011.

== Track listing ==
1. Pride (In the Name of Love) - U2
2. Red Rain - Peter Gabriel
3. The Rose - Bette Midler
4. Early Winter - (Tim Rice-Oxley, Gwen Stefani) original by Gwen Stefani
5. Human - The Killers
6. Streets of Philadelphia - Bruce Springsteen
7. Love Beats Anything
8. Wake Me Up When September Ends - Green Day
9. Everything is Beautiful - Amelia Brightman
10. Wonderwall - Oasis
11. In the Morning - Mammy
12. Bravado - Rush
13. Heaven - Bryan Adams
14. River of Life (Amelia Brightman)

=== Certifications ===
Region	Certification	Certified units/sales
Germany (BVMI)	Gold	100,000^{^}
^{^} Shipments figures based on certification alone.
