= Masters of Chant Chapter IV =

Studio album by Gregorian
- Released: 6 October 2003
- Recorded: 2003: Angel Recording Studios/London; Nemo Studios/Hamburg; Proloton Studio/Hamburg; Studio Versailles/Paris; Vox Klangstudio/Bendestorf
- Genre: Gregorian chant
- Label: Edel America Records

Gregorian chronology
| Masters of Chant Chapter III (2002) | Masters of Chant Chapter IV (2003) | The Dark Side (2004) |

Masters of Chant IV is the fifth studio album by German band Gregorian.

== Track listing ==
1. "The Gift" (Carsten Heusmann, Amelia Brightman)
2. "Bridge over Troubled Water" (Paul Simon) (original by Simon and Garfunkel)
3. "With or Without You" (U2) (original by U2)
4. "Maid of Orleans" (Andy McCluskey) (original by Orchestral Manoeuvres in the Dark)
5. "Angels" (Guy Chambers, Robbie Williams) (original by Robbie Williams)
6. "Evening Falls..." (Enya, Nicky Ryan) (original by Enya)
7. "I'll Find My Way Home" (Jon Anderson, Vangelis) (original by Jon & Vangelis)
8. "Imagine" (John Lennon) (original by John Lennon)
9. "For No One" (John Lennon, Paul McCartney) (original by The Beatles)
10. "Hide and Seek" (Howard Jones) (original by Howard Jones)
11. "World" (Barry Gibb, Maurice Gibb, Robin Gibb) (original by Bee Gees)
12. "High Hopes" (David Gilmour, Polly Samson) (original by Pink Floyd)
13. "Clocks" (Guy Berryman, Jon Buckland, Will Champion, Chris Martin) (original by Coldplay)

=== Bonus tracks ===
1. "The End of Days" (Jan-Eric Kohrs, Amelia Brightman)
2. "Heaven Is a Place on Earth" (Rick Nowels, Ellen Shipley) (original by Belinda Carlisle)
3. "Le Temps des Cathedrales" (Luc Plamondon, Riccardo Cocciante) (from the musical Notre Dame de Paris)

== Charts ==
| Chart (2004) | Peak position |
|---|---|
| Hungarian Albums (MAHASZ) | 23 |
