= Marquess (band) =

German pop band

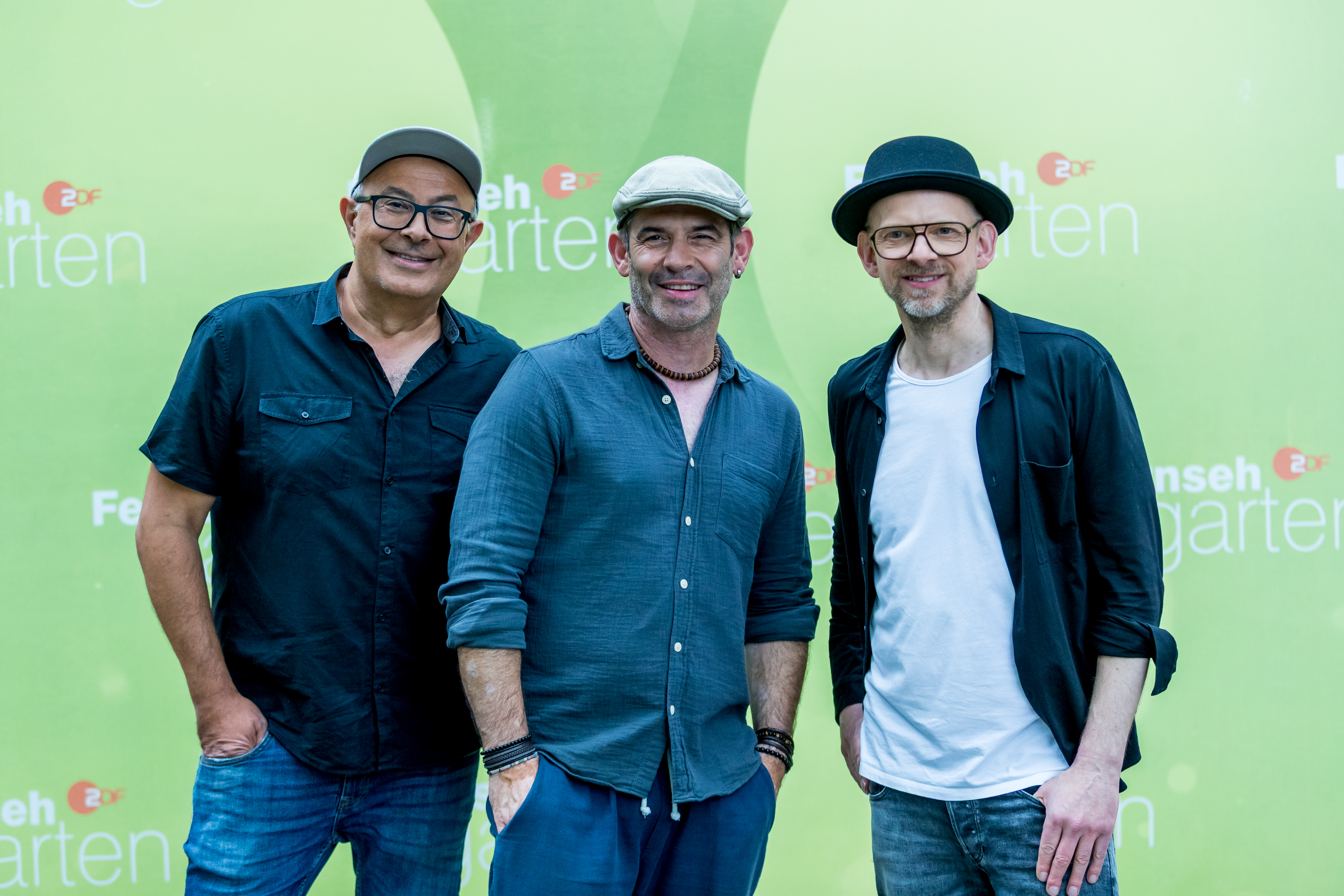
- Marquess at ZDF Fernsehgarten in 2025

Background information
- Origin: Hannover, Germany
- Genres: Latin pop
- Years active: 2006–present
- Members: Sascha Pierro; Christian Fleps; Dominik Decker
- Past members: Marco Heggen
- Website: http://www.marquess.de

Marquess is a German pop band established in 2006 in Hannover. The group predominantly sings songs in Spanish although with grammar and pronunciation mistakes. Their song "Vayamos compañeros" became very popular in the summer of 2007 ranking #1 in Poland, Switzerland, and the Czech Republic.

== History ==
Marquess' debut single El Temperamento is considered one of the summer hits of 2006, which first became popular in the vacation resorts of Central Europe and then reached the top 10 of the German singles charts. The song was originally written as an advertising soundtrack for Hanover Airport. In September 2006, the band released their debut album Marquess.

The success of Vayamos Compañeros led to lively interest from other European countries. Marquess made a live appearance on the Belgian television show Tien Om Te Zien in August 2007 and then went on a promotional tour in Belgium. Vayamos Compañeros was also released there as a single at the end of August, reaching number 60 in the charts.

On December 31, 2007, Marquess performed at the New Year's Eve celebrations at the Brandenburg Gate in Berlin.

On March 6, 2008, the musicians took part in the German preliminary round of the Eurovision Song Contest 2008 with La Histeria, but did not reach the final round of the selection.

Keyboardist Marco Heggen left the band in 2011. In June 2012, the band returned as a trio with their new album ¡bienvenido!, which now contains more electronics. In June 2014, the band released their sixth album Favoritas, which achieved gold status with over 100,000 units sold and on which the musicians interprete their favourite songs from Spain and Latin America. The Favoritas summer edition with seven newly produced bonus tracks was released in June 2015.

== Members ==
Current

- Sascha Pierro – lead vocals (2006–present)
- Christian Fleps – keyboards (2006–present)
- Dominik Decker – guitar (2006–present), bass (2011–present)

Former

- Marco Heggen –bass, keyboards (2006–2011)

== Discography ==
=== Albums ===
List of albums, with selected chart positions and certifications
Title	Album details	Peak chart positions			Certifications
Title	Album details	GER	AUT	SWI	Certifications
Marquess	Released: 29 September 2006; Label: Opium Records; Formats: CD, digital download	34	—	65	
Frenética	Released: 29 June 2007; Label: Starwatch; Formats: CD, digital download	2	27	4	BVMI: Platinum; IFPI SWI: Gold
¡Ya!	Released: 27 June 2008; Label: Starwatch; Formats: CD, digital download	7	29	8	
Compañía del sol	Released: 17 July 2009; Label: Starwatch; Formats: CD, digital download	24	7	23	
¡bienvenido!	Released: 22 June 2012; Label: Starwatch; Formats: CD, digital download	14	—	6	
Favoritas	Released: 6 June 2014; Label: Starwatch; Formats: CD, digital download	5	28	35	BVMI: Gold
Sol y soul	Released: 3 June 2016; Label: Starwatch; Formats: CD, digital download	28	—	92	
En movimiento	Released: 6 April 2018; Label: Starwatch; Formats: CD, digital download	11	—	35	
Turbulento	Released: 3 July 2020; Label: Starwatch; Formats: CD, digital download	13	—	79	
Energía	Released: 2 June 2023; Label: Telamo; Formats: CD, digital download	90	—	—	

=== Singles ===
List of singles, with selected chart positions and parent album
Title	Year	Peak chart positions							Album
Title	Year	GER	AUT	SWI	FIN	CZ	SWE	EU	Album
"El temperamento"	2006	10	53	16	10	79	—	35	Marquess
"Sorry & Goodbye"	2007	—	—	—	—	—	—	—	Marquess
"Vayamos compañeros"	2007	2	5	1	4	1	10	12	Frenética
"You and Not Tokio"	2007	66	—	80	—	48	—	—	Frenética
"La histeria"	2008	15	74	41	—	59	—	—	¡YA!
"La vida es limonada"	2008	16	25	15	—	44	—	50	¡YA!
"Lucia"	2009	60	—	—	—	—	—	—	¡YA!
"Arriba"	2009	16	75	57	18	—	—	—	Campania del sol
"Chapoteo"	2011	70	—	—	—	—	—	—	Non-album single
"¡bienvenido!"	2012	42	41	72	—	—	—	—	¡bienvenido!
