= Voyage, voyage =

1986 song by Desireless

Single by Desireless

from the album François
- Language: French
- B-side: "Destin Fragile" (instrumental)
- Released: 1986
- Studio: D'Aguesseau, Boulogne-sur-Mer, France
- Genre: Synth-pop; Eurodisco
- Length: 4:12
- Label: CBS
- Songwriters: Jean-Michel Rivat; Dominique Dubois
- Producer: Jean-Michel Rivat

Desireless singles chronology
"Qui peut savoir" (1986)	"Voyage, voyage" (1986)	"John" (1988)

Music video
- "Voyage, voyage" on YouTube

"Voyage, voyage" (French pronunciation: [vwajaʒ vwajaʒ]) is a song by French singer Desireless, first released as a single in 1986, later included on her 1989 debut album, François (1989). The lyrics were written by Jean-Michel Rivat on 11 October 1985 (according to SACEM) and the music by Dominique Dubois was composed around 1986; the song was produced by Rivat. Sung entirely in French, the song became an international success between 1986 and 1988, reaching the top position in more than ten countries in Europe.

== Critical reception ==
A review in Pan-European magazine Music & Media described "Voyage, Voyage" as a song having a "high-pitched, dramatic vocals over a contagious electro-beat, in an Alphaville-type of setting. Very strong chart appeal outside France, especially in an English translation".

== Chart performance ==
Since "Voyage, voyage" is sung exclusively in French, its chart success came as a surprise as it managed the rare feat of becoming a success in several nations usually closed to Francophone songs and artists, such as the United Kingdom and Ireland. In West Germany, the song topped the chart, and has the longest chart trajectory of 1987 in the top 20. It also reached number one in Austria, Norway, and Spain. The song missed the top spot in France, peaking at number two for four weeks, behind Elsa Lunghini's "T'en va pas".

The song initially reached number 53 on the UK Singles Chart in November 1987. After being remixed by Pete Hammond and Pete Waterman of PWL, the song was re-released in the United Kingdom in the spring of 1988, and climbed to number five in June of that year. The song's success continued in Ireland, where it reached number four twice, the original version in November 1987, followed by the PWL remix in June 1988.

== Music video ==
The music video for "Voyage, voyage" was directed by Bettina Rheims, and premiered in France in December 1986. It depicts Desireless entering a manor where a number of people are listlessly lingering around, and enticing them with her song and a slideshow to see the world and make more out of their lives. The video features actor David Caruso.

== Track listings ==
- 7-inch single

A. "Voyage, voyage" – 4:12
B. "Destin fragile" (instrumental) – 3:31

- 12-inch single

A. "Voyage, voyage" (extended remix) – 6:45
B. "Voyage, voyage" – 4:12

- 1988 UK 12-inch single and CD single (Britmix)
1. "Voyage voyage" (Britmix) – 7:06
2. "Voyage voyage" (Euro Remix Remix) – 6:12
3. "Destin fragile" (instrumental) – 3:31

== Credits and personnel ==
Credits adapted from the liner notes of the 7-inch single of "Voyage, voyage".

=== Recording ===
- Recorded at Studio D'Aguesseau, Boulogne-sur-Mer, France
- Mixed at Studio Marcadet, Paris

=== Personnel ===
- Desireless – vocals
- Dominique Dubois – sampler
- Jean-Michel Rivat – synthesiser, programming, production
- Antoine Cambourakis – recording
- Gilbert Courtois – recording
- Dominique Blanc-Francard – mixing
- Daniel Glikmans – backing vocals
- Claudie Fritsch-Mentrop – backing vocals

== Charts ==
=== Weekly charts ===
1986–1987 weekly chart performance for "Voyage, voyage"
Chart (1986–1987)	Peak position
Austria (Ö3 Austria Top 40)	1
Belgium (Ultratop 50 Flanders)	19
Belgium (Ultratop 40 Wallonia)	2
Europe (European Hot 100 Singles)	18
Europe (European Airplay Top 50)	30
Finland (Suomen virallinen lista)	11
France (SNEP)	2
Ireland (IRMA)	4
Italy (Musica e dischi)	21
Netherlands (Dutch Top 40)	11
Netherlands (Single Top 100)	9
Norway (VG-lista)	1
Portugal (UNEVA)	3
Quebec (ADISQ)	3
Spain (AFYVE)	1
Sweden (Sverigetopplistan)	11
Switzerland (Schweizer Hitparade)	4
UK Singles (Official Charts)	53
UK Dance (Music Week)	25
Uruguay (CUD)	1
West Germany (GfK)	1

1988 weekly chart performance for "Voyage, voyage" (Britmix)
Chart (1988)	Peak position
Europe (Eurochart Hot 100 Singles)	17
Ireland (IRMA)	4
Luxembourg (Radio Luxembourg)	5
UK Singles (Official Charts)	5
UK Dance (Music Week)	8

2014–2026 weekly chart performance for "Voyage, voyage"
Chart (2014–2026)	Peak position
CIS Airplay (TopHit)	182
Kazakhstan Airplay (TopHit)	90
Russia Airplay (TopHit)	179
Ukraine Airplay (TopHit)	172

=== Year-end charts ===
1986 year-end chart performance for "Voyage, voyage"
Chart (1986)	Position
France (SNEP)	6

1987 year-end chart performance for "Voyage, voyage"
Chart (1987)	Position
Austria (Ö3 Austria Top 40)	7
Europe (European Hot 100 Singles)	6
Netherlands (Single Top 100)	85
Spain (AFYVE)	1
Switzerland (Schweizer Hitparade)	1
West Germany (Media Control)	1

1988 year-end chart performance for "Voyage, voyage"
Chart (1988)	Position
UK Singles (OCC)	90

== Certifications and sales ==
Certifications and sales for "Voyage, voyage"
Region	Certification	Certified units/sales
France (SNEP)	Gold	756,000
Germany (BVMI)	Gold	500,000^{^}
Spain (Promusicae)	2× Platinum	100,000^{^}
Summaries
Worldwide	—	2,000,000
^{^} Shipments figures based on certification alone.

== Wink version ==
"Eien no Ladydoll (Voyage, Voyage)"

Single by Wink

from the album Aphrodite
- Language: Japanese
- English title: Eternal Ladydoll (Voyage, Voyage)
- B-side: "Alone Again"
- Released: 24 February 1993
- Length: 4:59
- Label: Polystar
- Composers: Jean-Michel Rivat; Dominique Dubois
- Lyricist: Neko Oikawa
- Producer: Haruo Mizuhashi

Wink singles chronology
"Real na Yume no Jōken" (1992)	"Eien no Ladydoll (Voyage, Voyage)" (1993)	"Kekkon Shiyoune" (1993)

Music video
- "Eien no Ladydoll (Voyage, Voyage)" on YouTube

"Voyage, voyage" was covered in Japanese by the idol duo Wink as "Eien no Ladydoll (Voyage, Voyage)" (永遠のレディードール 〜Voyage Voyage〜, Eien no Redīdōru ~Voyage Voyage~; lit. "Eternal Ladydoll ~Voyage, Voyage~). Released on 24 February 1993 by Polystar Records, it was their 17th single, with Japanese lyrics written by Neko Oikawa. These lyrics are not a translation. They describe a painful separation, while the French original encouraged World travel, possibly as a metaphor.

The single peaked at No. 19 on Oricon's singles chart and sold over 69,000 copies.

=== Track listing ===
No.	Title	Lyrics	Music	Arrangement	Length
1.	"Eien no Ladydoll (Voyage, Voyage)" (Eien no Redīdōru ~Voyage Voyage~ (永遠のレディードール 〜Voyage Voyage〜; "Eternal Ladydoll ~Voyage, Voyage~))	Neko Oikawa	Jean-Michel Rivat; Dominique Dubois	Motoki Funayama	4:59
2.	"Alone Again"	Rui Serizawa	Jamey Jaz; Ren Toppano; Viqui Denman	Satoshi Kadokura	4:40

=== Weekly charts ===
Chart (1993)	Peak position
Japan Oricon Singles Chart	19

== Kate Ryan version ==
"Voyage Voyage"

Single by Kate Ryan

from the album Free
- Language: French
- B-side: "We All Belong"
- Released: 2007
- Studio: Cosmos, Stockholm
- Genre: Eurodance
- Length: 3:07
- Label: ARS Entertainment; Universal Music
- Songwriters: Jean-Michel Rivat; Dominique Dubois
- Producer: 2N

Kate Ryan singles chronology
"All for You" (2007)	"Voyage Voyage" (2007)	"L.I.L.Y. (Like I Love You)" (2008)

Music video
- "Voyage, voyage" on YouTube

Belgian singer Kate Ryan covered the song for her fourth studio album Free (2008). Released as the album's lead single in 2007, with "We All Belong" on its B-side, was the anthem of the event EuroGames 2007 that took place in Antwerp, Belgium, in 2007.

It was Ryan's first single released under ARS Entertainment, following her departure from EMI Belgium. Commercially, "Voyage Voyage" reached number two in Belgium, as well as the top 10 in Finland, the Netherlands and Spain.

=== Track listing ===
- CD single
1. "Voyage Voyage"
2. "Voyage Voyage" (extended version)
3. "We All Belong"
4. "We All Belong" (extended version)

=== Charts ===
Chart (2007–2008)	Peak position
Austria (Ö3 Austria Top 40)	26
Belgium (Ultratop 50 Flanders)	2
Belgium (Ultratop 50 Wallonia)	28
CIS Airplay (TopHit)	65
Finland (Suomen virallinen lista)	10
Germany (GfK)	13
Netherlands (Dutch Top 40)	10
Netherlands (Single Top 100)	11
Spain (Promusicae)	6
Sweden (Sverigetopplistan)	26

=== Year-end charts ===
Chart (2007)	Position
Belgium (Ultratop 50 Flanders)	13
Netherlands (Dutch Top 40)	76
Netherlands (Single Top 100)	60

=== Certifications and sales ===
Region	Certification	Certified units/sales
Spain (Promusicae)	Gold	10,000^{*}
Spain (Promusicae) Ringtone	Platinum	20,000^{*}
^{*} Sales figures based on certification alone.

== Other covers ==
"Voyage, voyage" was also covered by the Mexican band Magneto in 1991, with a version in Spanish titled "Vuela Vuela" (English: Fly, fly). Mikel Herzog was credited with the translation. This version peaked at number three on Billboard's Hot Latin Songs chart. The gothic metal band Sirenia released their cover of "Voyage, voyage" on 10 February 2021 as a single and music video to their album Riddles, Ruins & Revelations which also is included as a bonus track on the album.

== See also ==
- List of number-one hits of 1987 (Germany)
- List of number-one singles of 1987 (Spain)
- VG-lista 1964 to 1994
