= Dynazty =

Swedish metal band

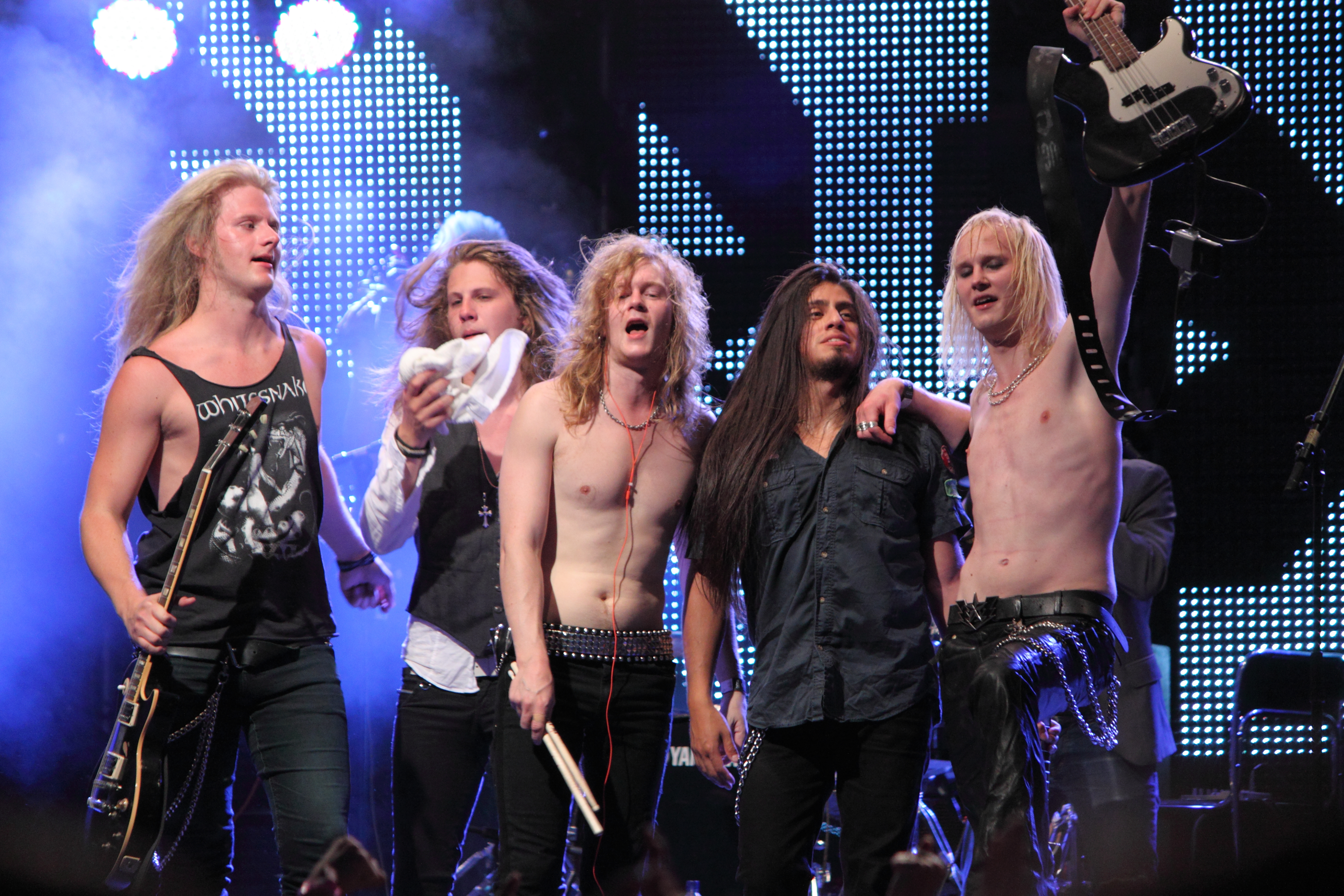

Background information
- Origin: Sweden, Stockholm
- Genres: Power metal; heavy metal; hard rock
- Years active: 2007–present
- Labels: Perris; StormVox; SoFo; Spinefarm; AFM; Nuclear Blast
- Members: Nils Molin; Georg Härnsten Egg; Love Magnusson; Mike Lavér; Jonathan Olsson
- Past members: John Berg; Joel Fox Apelgren
- Website: dynazty.com

Dynazty are a Swedish heavy metal band from Stockholm.

== History ==
Dynazty was established by Love Magnusson and John Berg in 2007. Soon members Georg Härnsten Egg and Joel Fox Apelgren joined in. After a few gigs with various vocalists, they found the singer and frontman Nils Molin through Myspace in Spring of 2008. Since then, Dynazty has released eight full-length albums and has toured in Sweden and internationally.

The band took part in Melodifestivalen 2011 with the song "This Is My Life", a metal cover of the previous winner (Melodifestivalen 2010) Anna Bergendahl. The band also competed in Melodifestivalen 2012 with the song "Land of Broken Dreams" in the fourth round in Malmö on 25 February 2012. The song went on to "second chance" round but failed to make it to the Final 10.

The band released its third album Sultans of Sin on 29 February 2012. According to the bassist of the band, Joel Fox Apelgren, the album was produced by Peter Tägtgren and they have also co-written one song with Chris Laney and one song with Nicke Borg. The album has an extended solo version of Bastards of Rock & Roll and a bonus track called Madness on the Japanese edition as well.

In 2013, Dynazty signed a record deal with Spinefarm Records for their fourth studio album Renatus (Latin for "Rebirth"). This record not only marked a change in the band's sound, and line-up, but lyrical themes as well, instead of focusing on common '80s rock themes such partying and freedom, it included deeper lyrics that concern mortality and spirituality, as well as incorporating religious imagery and themes. The album included one single, "Starlight".

In 2016 the band released another album, Titanic Mass, which continued with the band's new more melodic direction, and mature deep lyrical themes. This album again included one single, "The Human Paradox". This was also their last release on Spinefarm.

In July 2017, Swedish heavy metal band Amaranthe stated on their Facebook page that Nils Molin would join the band as their permanent vocalist, after filling in for Jake E on tour dates while continuing to sing for Dynazty simultaneously.

On 21 July 2018, it was announced that Dynazty had signed to AFM Records. On 27 July, the single "Breathe with Me" was released, the first of three singles from their sixth album Firesign, which was released on 28 September 2018. This album featured a more fast-paced and less metal direction than Titanic Mass. "Breathe with Me" was followed by "The Grey" on 24 August 2018, and finally the title track "Firesign" on 14 September.

On 30 January 2020, they released the first single from their seventh album The Dark Delight entitled "Presence of Mind". "Heartless Madness" followed on 28 February and finally "Waterfall" on 13 March. The Dark Delight was released on 3 April 2020, and marked their second release under AFM Records. The album also includes the band's first collaboration, with Nils Molin's Amaranthe bandmate Henrik "Gg6" Englund Wilhelmsson featuring on the fourth track "From Sound to Silence" and "Apex".

In July 2021, Dynazty entered the studio to begin recording their eighth studio album, Final Advent. The first single, "Advent", was released on 29 October 2021, followed by "Power of Will" on 3 December 2021. Final Advent was officially released on 26 August 2022.

== Discography ==
=== Albums ===
Year	Album details
2009	Bring the Thunder: Released: 21 July 2009; Producer: Chris Laney; Label: Perris Records; Format: CD
2011	Knock You Down: Released: 20 April 2011; Producer: Michael Vail Blum; Label: StormVox Records; Format: CD
2012	Sultans of Sin: Released: 29 February 2012; Producer: Peter Tägtgren; Label: SoFo Records; Format: CD, LP
2014	Renatus: Released: 31 March 2014; Producer: Dynazty; Label: Spinefarm Records; Format: CD
2016	Titanic Mass: Released: 15 April 2016; Producer: Dynazty; Label: Spinefarm Records; Format: CD
2018	Firesign: Release date: 28 September 2018; Producer: Dynazty; Label: AFM Records; Format: CD
2020	The Dark Delight: Release date: 3 April 2020; Producer: Dynazty; Label: AFM Records; Format: CD
2022	Final Advent: Release date: 26 August 2022; Producer: Dynazty; Label: AFM Records; Format: CD
2025	Game of Faces: Release date: 14 February 2025; Producer: Dynazty; Label: Nuclear Blast Records; Format: CD

=== Singles ===
==== 2009 ====
- "Far Away"
- "Lights Out in Candyland"
- "Bring the Thunder"

==== 2011 ====
- "This Is My Life"
- "Get It On"
- "Mr. Money"

==== 2012 ====
- "Sultans of Sin"
- "Land of Broken Dreams"
- "Raise Your Hands"

==== 2014 ====
- "Starlight"

==== 2016 ====
- "The Human Paradox"

==== 2018 ====
- "Breathe with Me"
- "The Grey"
- "Firesign"

==== 2020 ====
- "Presence of Mind"
- "Heartless Madness"
- "Waterfall"

==== 2021 ====
- "Advent"
- "Power of Will"

==== 2022 ====
- "Yours"
- "Natural Born Killer"
- "The White"

==== 2024 ====
- "Devilry of Ecstasy"
- "Game of Faces"

==== 2025 ====
- "Call of the Night"
