= Forever or Never =

"Forever Or Never"

Single by Cinema Bizarre

from the album Final Attraction
- Released: February 29, 2008
- Genre: Synthpop
- Length: 3:20 (album version)
- Label: Island
- Songwriter(s): Thomas Troelsen, Remee
- Producer(s): Thomas Troelsen, Remee

Cinema Bizarre singles chronology
"Escape to the Stars" (2007)	"Forever Or Never" (2008)	"I Came 2 Party" (2009)

"Forever Or Never" is the third single by German band Cinema Bizarre, from their debut album Final Attraction. The song was also recorded in Korean by boy band Shinee in 2009. The song was in the German national final for the Eurovision Song Contest 2008.

== Track listing ==
These are the formats and track listings of major single releases of "Forever Or Never".

Digital download

1. "Forever Or Never (Radio Version)" – 3:01
2. "Forever Or Never (Alternative Radio Rockin' Beatzarre Remix)" – 3:11
3. "Forever Or Never (Fat Tony Crews Brooklyn Night Shower Remix)" – 3:59
4. "Forever Or Never (Beatzarre Remix)" – 4:14

CD Maxi

1. "Forever Or Never (Radio Version)" – 3:01
2. "Forever Or Never (Alternative Radio Rockin' Beatzarre Remix)" – 3:11
3. "Forever Or Never (Fat Tony Crews Brooklyn Night Shower Remix)" – 3:59
4. "Forever Or Never (Beatzarre Remix)" – 4:14
5. "Forever Or Never (Video)"

== Chart performance ==
"Forever Or Never" has been listed for 5 weeks in 2 different charts. Its first appearance was week 10/2008 in the Austria Singles Top 75 and the last appearance was week 15/2008 in the Germany Singles Top 100. Its peak position was number 44, on the Germany Singles Top 100, it stayed there for 1 week. Its highest entry was number 44 in the Germany Singles Top 100.

== Charts ==
Chart (2009)	Peak position
Austrian Singles Chart	71
German Singles Chart	44
