= Bring the Thunder =

Studio album by Dynazty
- Released: July 21, 2009
- Recorded: 2008–2009 - Perris Records (Sweden)
- Genre: Hard rock
- Length: 42:25
- Label: Perris Records
- Producer: Chris Laney

Dynazty chronology
Bring the Thunder (2009)	Knock You Down (2011)

Bring the Thunder is the debut album from Swedish rock band Dynazty.

== Track listing ==
Music & lyrics by Dynazty.

1. "Bring the Thunder"
2. "Catch the Night"
3. "Lights Out (In Candyland)"
4. "Far Away"
5. "Top of the Line"
6. "Monkey Wants Monkey Needs"
7. "Adrenaline"
8. "Take Me Down"
9. "The Devil's Shake"
10. "Higher N' Higher"
11. "Sail Away" (bonus track)

== Personnel ==
Band

- Nils Molin – lead vocals
- Rob Love – guitar
- John Berg – guitar
- Joey Fox – bass guitar
- George Egg – drums

Production

- Produced, engineered, mixed and mastered by Chris Laney
