= Escape to the Stars =

"Escape To The Stars"

Single by Cinema Bizarre

from the album Final Attraction
- Released: December 7, 2007
- Genre: Glam rock
- Length: 3:39
- Label: Island
- Songwriter(s): Martin L. Gore, Andreas John, Erik Macholl, Alexah Carlton
- Producer(s): Ingo Politz

Cinema Bizarre singles chronology
"Lovesongs (They Kill Me)" (2007)	"Escape To The Stars" (2007)	"Forever Or Never" (2008)

"Escape To The Stars" is a glam rock song and the second single by German band Cinema Bizarre, from their debut album Final Attraction. This song features samples from synthpop band Depeche Mode's "Everything Counts".

== Track listing ==
These are the formats and track listings of major single releases of "Escape To The Stars".

2-Track Version

1. "Escape To The Stars (Radio Version)" – 3:39
2. "Lovesongs (They Kill Me) (IAMX Remix)" – 4:53

Digital download

1. "Escape To The Stars (Radio Version)" – 3:39
2. "The Other People" – 3:35
3. "Escape To The Stars (Rough Edge Mix)" – 4:13
4. "Escape To The Stars (Extended Version) – 4:43
5. "Lovesongs (They Kill Me) (IAMX Remix)" – 4:53

CD Maxi

1. "Escape To The Stars (Radio Version)" – 3:39
2. "The Other People" – 3:35
3. "Escape To The Stars (Rough Edge Mix)" – 4:13
4. "Escape To The Stars (Extended Version) – 4:43
5. "Lovesongs (They Kill Me) (IAMX Remix)" – 4:53
6. "Escape To The Stars" (Video)

== Chart performance ==
"Escape To The Stars" has been listed for six weeks in two different charts. Its first appearance was week 50/2007 in the Austria Singles Top 75 and the last appearance was week 5/2008 in the Germany Singles Top 100. Its peak position was number 36, on the Germany Singles Top 100, it stayed there for one week. Its highest entry was number 36 in the Germany Singles Top 100.

== Charts ==
Chart (2009)	Peak position
Austrian Singles Chart	61
German Singles Chart	36

== Music video ==
The music video for "Escape to the Stars", directed by German director Marcus Sternberg for Free the Dragon, was filmed at the International Congress Centrum in Berlin, Germany in one day. Heavily science fiction influenced, it draws direct inspiration from the movie Blade Runner as Strify stated in an interview in German television. Huge parts of the video were 3d-animated and shot in front of the green screen. The video starts with an orange sunset in a futuristic town with a lot of towers and the band playing in front of a metallic wall on a bridge. Each member has got a single sequence in a different setting, Yu playing the guitar in a room where the lights are lit, looking like a spaceship, Strify sitting on the bench of a huge window with a mirror reflection and the town outside. Between those scenes, spaceships and the animated town can be seen. One scene includes a flying object with screens showing the band members, resembling the cover art for the album Final Attraction There are flying advertisement spaces with messages like "Leave Today" or "Adventure of a lifetime". In the end Strify is sitting in one of the spaceships and is seen leaving the planet aiming to the stars. The video premiered on German music television channel VIVA and according to the band the video was finished on the day of its premiere, the band only having seen an offline version before, with the director himself bringing the video to the music channel an hour before getting on air.
