= Dreams Now Reality =

Italian glam rock band

DNR
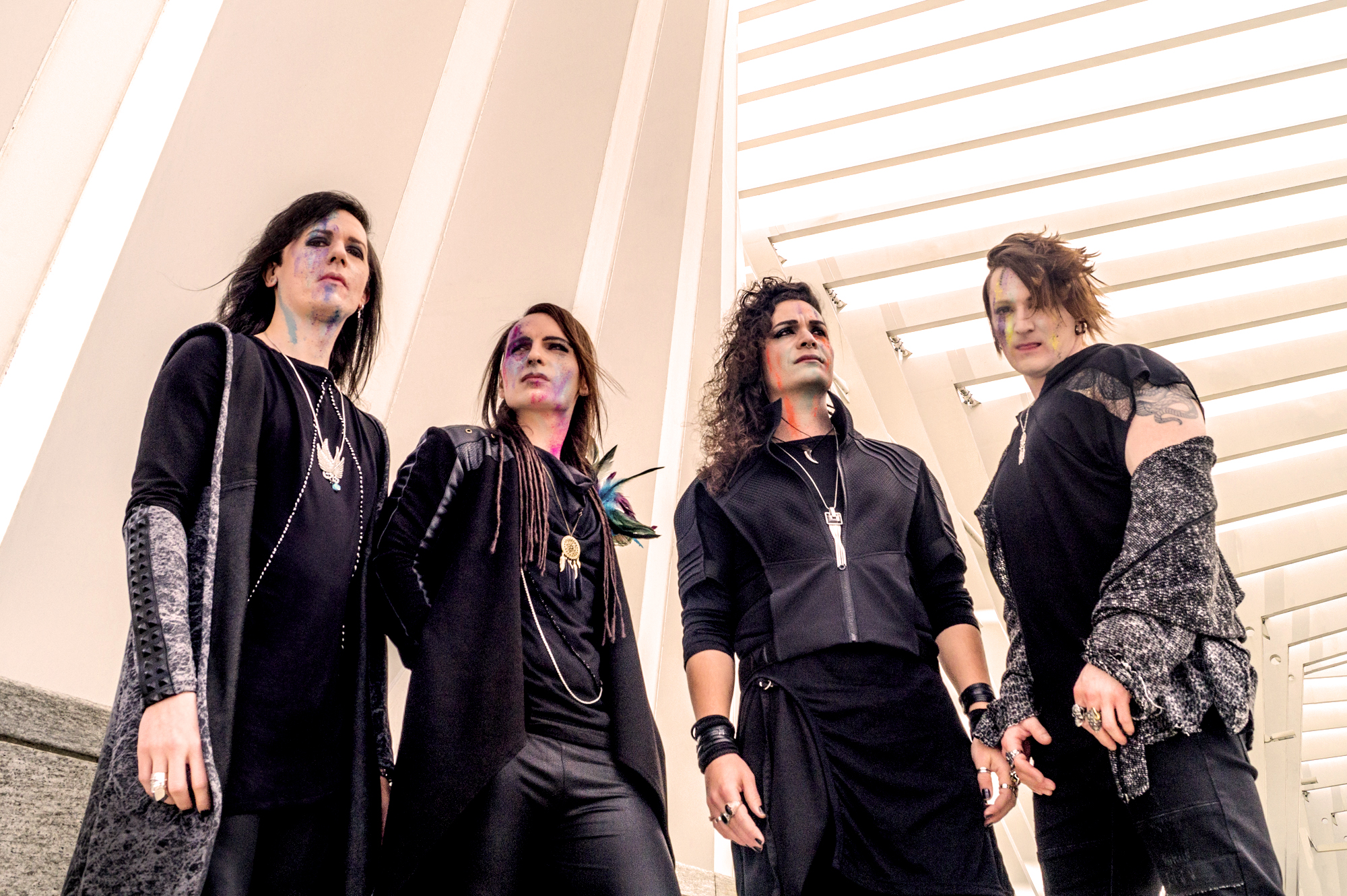

Background information
- Also known as: Dreams Not Reality, Dreams Now Reality, Do Not Reanimate
- Origin: Modena, Italy
- Genres: Glam rock; hard rock; indie rock; pop rock; alternative rock
- Labels: Fastermaster Records, Miraloop, KRmusic, Perris Records
- Members: Ash; Flow; Kira paZ
- Past members: Mantis; Sieg; Seba; Axia; Yu Phoenix; Luminor †
- Website: dnrofficial.com

Dreams Now Reality (formerly known as Do Not Reanimate and Dreams Not Reality and officially abbreviated as DNR) is an Italian glam rock band formed in Modena, Italy. They have performed domestically, as well as internationally at venues in Russia, Japan, Ukraine, and Belarus. Their look is self-described as "Eurovisual" - taking influences from Japanese visual kei and Western glam rock. Luminor, formerly of Cinema Bizarre, has collaborated extensively with the band. The band's full name changed to "Dreams Not Reality" after the departure of Mantis, as the remaining members sought a more optimistic name.

They released their first single "Visual Evolution" in 2008 and first studio album, Visual Evolution Reloaded, in 2009 under the independent label Miraloop.

In January 2011, a new single "Beyond This World" was released with the first video produced by Matteo Cifelli and Toby Chapman (Spandau Ballet, Lionel Richie, Andy Taylor, Tom Jones) under Fastermaster Records.

Sebastiano Serafini joined the band in May 2011 as the fifth member "Seba", Sebastiano playing keyboard and performing vocals for the band. Together, they opened up for Versailles on June 4, 2011, in Salerno, and also played at the 2011 V-Rock Festival held at Saitama Super Arena. The band was also part of the lineup for V-Love Live International, which took place two days later on October 25. Their first single under Serafini's lineup, "A Taste of... Eurovisual" was released in October 2011 The year 2012 saw Dreams Not Reality opening for INORAN (guitarist and co-founder of the rock band Luna Sea) during his European tour, Seven Samurais.(gigs of: Vienna, Cologne) .

In September 2012 they opened up for INORAN (guitarist and co-founder of the rock band Luna Sea) for his European tour, Seven Samurais (gigs of: Vienna, Cologne) .

In January 2013, Sieg announced his departure from the band, paving the way for Yu Phoenix, ex-guitarist of Cinema Bizarre, to join as the new guitarist.

In 2014, the band released their second album, DREAMFINITY, funded through PledgeMusic and KR-music.

A setback occurred in 2015 when a car accident involving the drummer led to a temporary hiatus, resulting in the cancellation of their Japanese performance at the Visual Unite Event.

2017 brought the release of the DREAMFINITY Deluxe Edition through the American Perris Records., and in October, Dreams Now Reality opened for Lordi on the SEXORCISM European tour, (gigs of: Bologna, San Donà di Piave).

Looking ahead to 2024, Dreams Now Reality introduced a new lineup, featuring paZ as the guitarist and Flow as the vocalist.

A milestone in the band's history was achieved on May 13, 2012, when DNR became the first non-Japanese band to perform at the Stylish Wave event at Akasaka BLITZ.

== Band members ==
Current members

- Kira – bass (2008–present)
- Ash – drums (2008–present)
- Flow – vocals (2024–present)
- paZ – guitar (2024–present)

EX members

- Mantis – vocals (2008–2009)
- Sieg – guitars (2008-2013)
- Luminor – Keyboards, vocals (2009-2011)
- Sebastiano Serafini – Keyboards, vocals (2011-2013)
- Yu Phoenix – guitar (2013–2018)
- Axia – vocals (2009–2018)

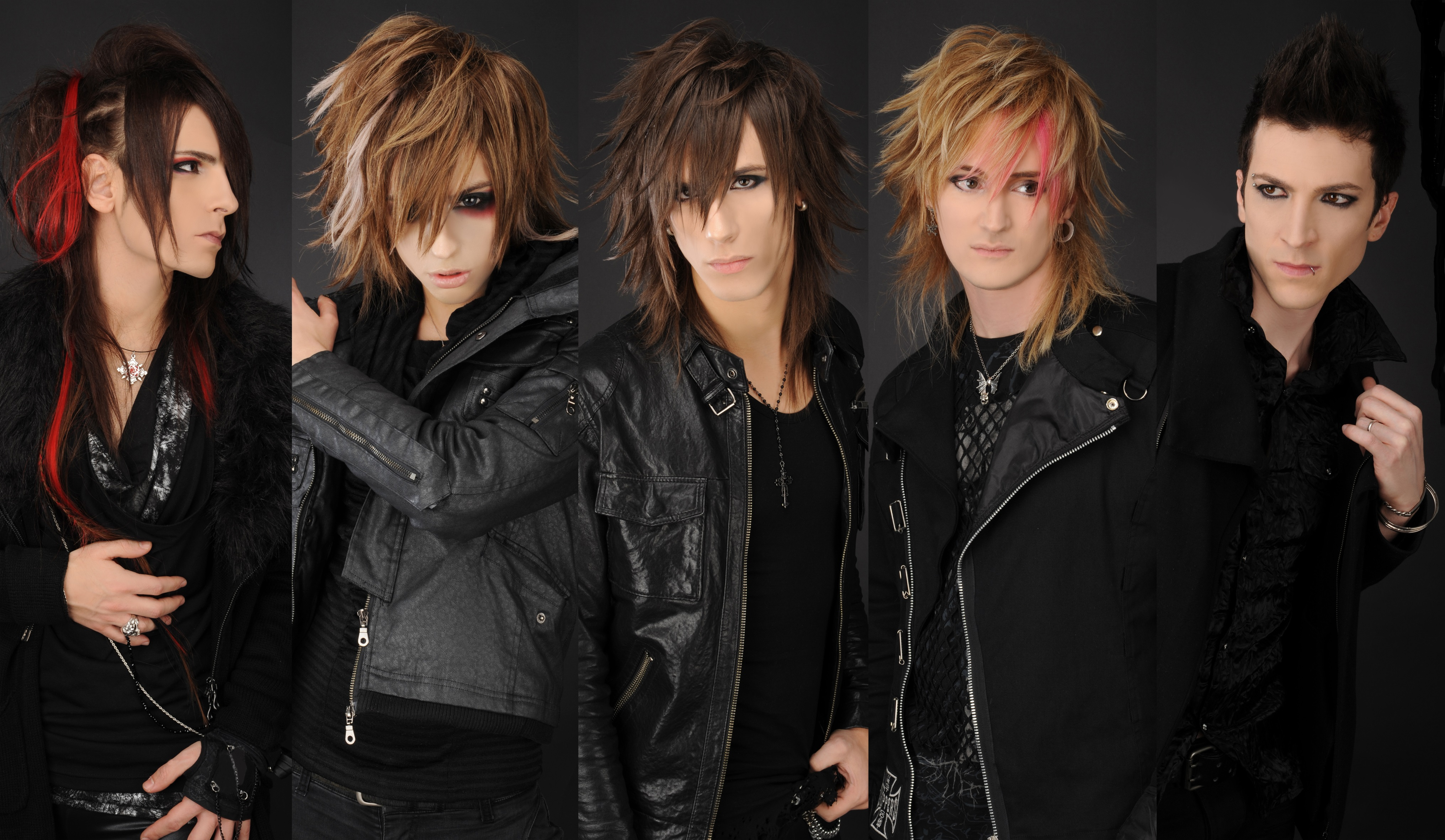
DNR, line-up 2012, from left: Kira, Seba, AxiA, Ash, Sieg.

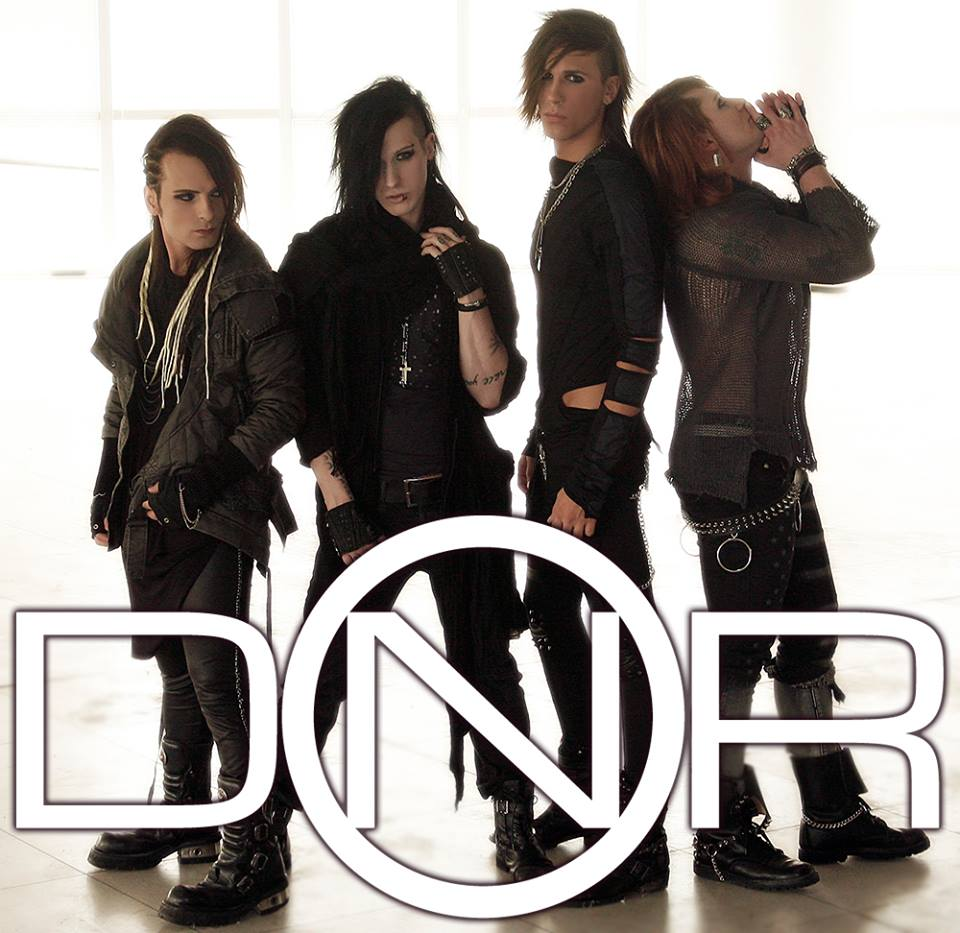
DNR, line-up 2014, from left: Kira, Yu, Axia, Ash.

Timeline
