= Nils Molin =

Swedish musician

Nils Johan Molin
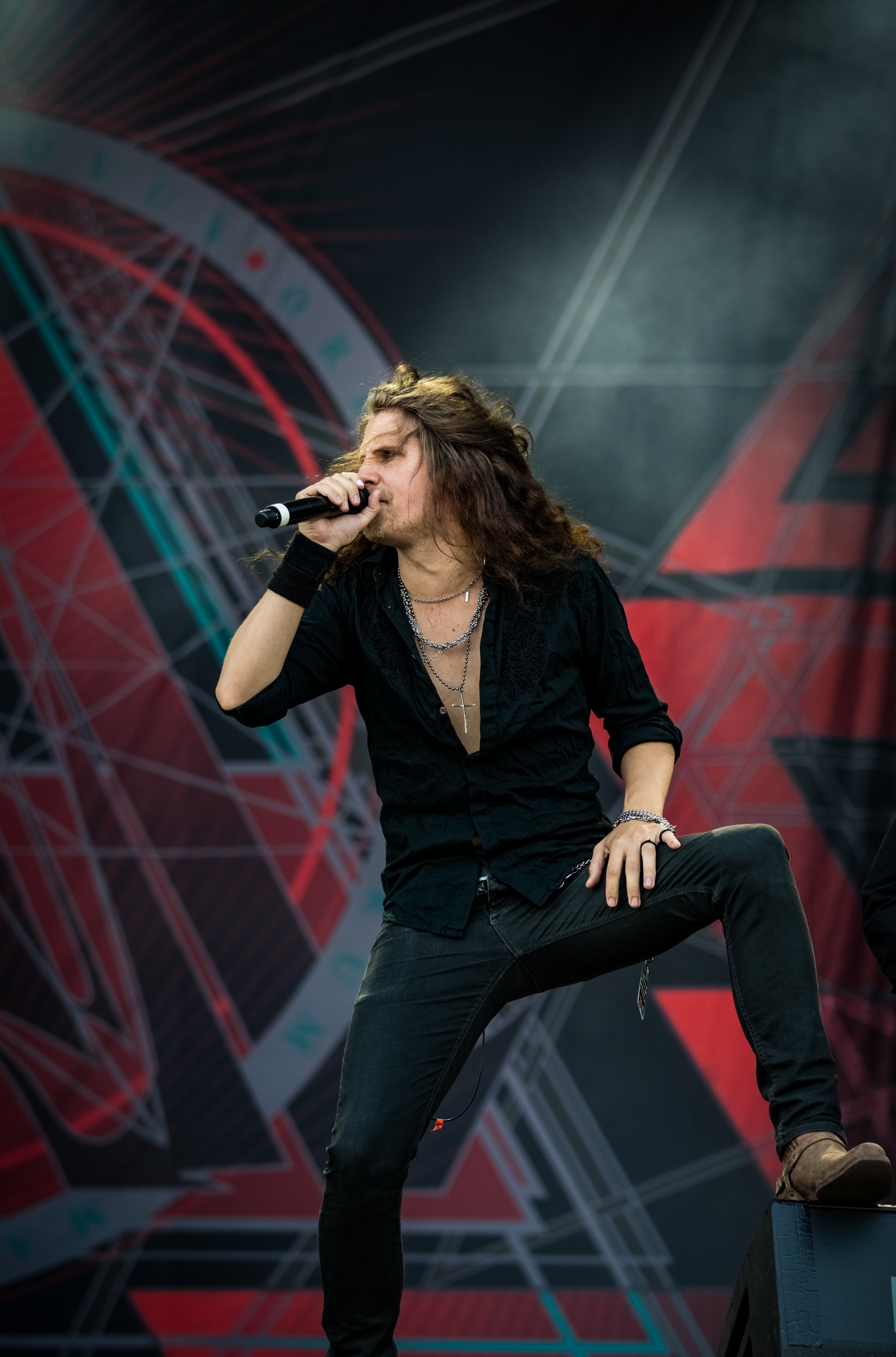
- Amaranthe - Wacken Open Air 2018
- Born: October 18, 1988 (age 37); Kilafors, Sweden
- Occupations: Singer, composer, lyricist
- Years active: 2008–present

Nils Molin (born October 18, 1988) is a Swedish musician, singer, composer, songwriter, vocalist of the bands Dynazty, Amaranthe and New Horizon.

== Biography ==
Nils Molin was born in the small Swedish town of Kilafors. In high school, he began playing in local bands, and from there, as he says, his musical career started to develop. In 2008, Nils joined the band Dynazty. He was discovered through his MySpace page, where he posted a demo recording, which attracted the interest of the new band's musicians and prompted him to come to Stockholm for an audition.

Nils describes his band's work as a melodic hard rock-metal band with a wide range of influences from the past and present. The band has always placed melody at the center of their work. Initially, the musicians played a genre that Nils himself describes as retro hard rock. But with the 2014 album Renatus, the band underwent a significant sonic revolution. From then on, Dynazty's music became more contemporary and, with each subsequent album, moved closer to the heavy metal sound of today.

In 2017, Nils Molin joined Amaranthe, whose members he first met back in 2012. Many Dynazty fans feared that Nils would abandon his main band, but this did not happen. Nils performs male clean vocals in Amaranthe.

In 2024, Nils recorded an album with New Horizon, a band formed by H.E.A.T. member Jonah Tee.

Molin recorded a single with ORDEN OGAN in Final Days in 2021. Nils Molin has many other interests besides music. For example, he loves European football and different inventions.

== Discography ==
Dynazty
Year	Name	Label
2009	Bring the Thunder	Perris Records
2011	Knock You Down	StormVox Records
2012	Sultans of Sin	SoFo Records
2014	Renatus	Spinefarm Records
2016	Тitanic Mass	Spinefarm Records
2018	Firesign	AFM Records
2020	The Dark Delight	AFM Records
2022	Final Advent	AFM Records
2025	Game of Faces	Nuclear Blast Records

Amaranthe
Year	Name	Label
2018	Helix	Spinefarm Records
2020	Manifest	Nuclear Blast Records
2024	The Catalyst	Nuclear Blast Records

New Horizon
Year	Name	Label
2024	Conquerors	Frontiers Music
