= Sebastiano Serafini =

Italian model, actor and musician

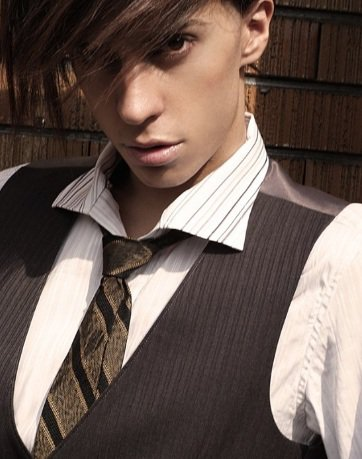
- Born: Trento, Italy
- Other name: Seba
- Occupations: Singer, songwriter, keyboardist, model, actor
- Modeling information
- Height: 1.80 m (5 ft 11 in)
- Hair color: Brown
- Eye color: Dark brown
- Website: www.instagram.com/sebastianoserafini

Sebastiano Serafini is an Italian singer, songwriter, actor, and model. Serafini has worked in different countries including Hong Kong, Japan, Italy, Germany, and Thailand – where he made an appearance as the final MC at the 2013 You2Play Awards. He played a recurring role as the otaku Luca in the Japanese TV drama series Nihonjin no Shiranai Nihongo, and was in the drama Pompei as the son of Girolamo Panzetta. Serafini first began modeling at the age of 15. He is also the co-founder of Unlisted Community, the founder of a video game studio in Tokyo called Serafini Productions and the author of several digital manga, including UNSUBSCRIBERS and YTHS.

== Music ==
Serafini was a member of Italian visual rock band DNR (Dreams Not Reality) playing keyboard and performing vocals from 2011 to 2013 under the name "Seba". He opened up for Versailles on 4 June 2011 in Salerno, and he played at the 2011 V-Rock Festival held at Saitama Super Arena. They also performed as part of the lineup for V-Love Live International, which took place two days later on 25 October. With Seba's lineup, DNR was the first non-Japanese band to perform at the Stylish Wave event at Akasaka BLITZ.

Seba had also teamed up with Yu Phoenix of Cinema Bizarre to create a band called Monochrome Hearts, which seems to have since dissolved. Their first single, "Your Knight" was released on Amazon and iTunes in January 2013. Their second single, "When the Night Kills the Day" was released on Amazon and iTunes on 13 July 2013.

In 2014, he released "Never Walk Alone", with music video styled by fashion director Misha Janette.

In 2015, Serafini (as "Seba") joined Japanese visual/Vocaloid band Ecthelion as a manipulator. This line-up debuted at the band's first anniversary one-man show at Takadanobaba AREA on 25 March 2013.

Later in 2015, Serafini recorded his first solo album in Germany. He described the sound as pop music combined with a mix of dubstep and hardcore elements. The music video for his solo debut single "Fallen" (released on 7 November 2014 and hitting the No. 1 spot on the iTunes pop German chart on its first day of pre-order) features cameo appearances by Japanese artists including Aoi from the band Shazna, Yukimi (former member of Unite), shironuri artist minori and hyperrealistic body painter Hikaru Cho. A remix of "Fallen" was released on 21 November. Fallen is set to be used as the theme song to TV series Columns.

In March 2015, he released the single "Inori", featuring German violinist Max Reimer. Two music videos for the song were produced; the original of which was filmed on the beach in Naples, followed by a historical Japanese-themed version filmed at Toei Kyoto Studio Park. It was followed by "I Bleed". From later in the year, his single 'Don't Say" features actress Linah Matsuoka) in the video. In October 2015 three singles were released: "Akane" (the video for which was granted rights for the first time ever to film inside of Buonconsiglio Castle), "Tsubasa", and a new mix of "When the Night Kills the Day".

In 2016, he released the single "Avalon" on 27 January, "Escape to Infinity" in March, and "Higher" in April. All three music videos were shot in Italy. Later, in May, he released "Eclipse", followed by "Time for a Better World" in July. The songs provide the soundtrack to Italian anime White.

In September 2016, Serafini released three music videos: "Higher" (English version), "Higher" (Japanese version) (the costumes for which were designed by Bunka Fashion College students), and "Time for a Better World" (a collaboration with Deadpool in which he wore the original costume that was used in the film). Earlier in July, he released "Fighting Demons" as a collaboration with Dominic Pierson.

In November 2016, he released his album "Aeon".

In 2017, Serafini released the music video for his song "Trust the light" on 1 January and his 15th single "Tornado" on 23 February. In March, he released the Japanese version of "Your Knight".

== Discography ==
=== Studio albums ===
- Aeon (2016)
- If (2017)

=== Singles ===
- 2015 — Your Knight
- 2016 — Escape to Infinity
- 2016 — Trust the Light
- 2016 — Time for a Better World
- 2016 — Don't Say
- 2016 — Eclipse
- 2017 — Fire
- 2017 — On the Run
- 2017 — Alive
- 2017 — Fighting Demons
- 2017 — Clear
- 2018 — Flower
- 2018 — Another World Falls Down
- 2018 — Beyond This World
- 2018 — Neverland
- 2019 — Miracle
- 2020 — When You Fall Apart
- 2020 — Galaxy

== Music videos ==
- When You Fall Apart (2020)
- Miracle (2019)
- Neverland (2018)
- Another World Falls Down (2018)
- Flower (2018)
- Alive (2017)
- On the Run (2017)
- Fire (2017)
- Tornado (2017)
- Trust the light (2017)
- Higher (2016)
- Fighting Demons (2016)
- Time for a Better World (2016)
- Eclipse (2016)
- Escape to Infinity (2016)
- Avalon (2016) feat. Matthew P. Perry
- Your Knight feat. Yu Phoenix (2015)
- When the Night Kills the Day feat. Yu Phoenix (2015)
- Tsubasa (2015)
- Akane (2015)
- Don't Say (2015)
- I Bleed (2015)
- Inori (2015)
- Never Walk Alone (2014)
- Fallen (2014)

== Modeling ==
He has modeled for brands and fashion lines including h.Naoto, Sixh., Lip Service, Gstar, Stand Up!! The Fragile, Toni & Guy, Paul Smith, Jury Black, Blablahospital, tenuto by kawano, and True Religion. In the spring of 2013, he was chosen as the face of a campaign for Gintoki Accessory Stores.

== Design ==
Serafini, who was present in Tokyo during the 2011 Tōhoku earthquake and lost a friend in the resulting tsunami, co-founded Hope, a T-shirt fundraising project for Japanese earthquake and tsunami relief, with fashion company Like Atmosphere. According to Serafini, there is also a Hope Jewelry Project, a collaboration with Soho Hearts. Upon leaving Japan, he spent a week in Los Angeles hosting relief fundraisers alongside journalist and fashion blogger La Carmina, with whom he also contributed to LA Weekly.

Later in 2011, he designed a ring in collaboration with Strange Freak Designs, which was featured in Accestyle.

== Video games ==
- BrokenLore: Low (2025)
- BrokenLore: Don't Watch (2025)
- BrokenLore: Unfollow (2026)
- BrokenLore: Follow (2026)
- BrokenLore: Don't Lie (2026)
- BrokenLore: Ascend (2027)
- BrokenLore: Miki-Chan (2027)
- BrokenLore: Dark Dawn (TBD)
- BrokenLore: Don't Play (TBD)
