= Renatus (Dynazty album) =

Studio album by Dynazty
- Released: March 31, 2014
- Recorded: 2013 - Spinefarm, Finland
- Genre: Power metal, heavy metal
- Length: 44:52
- Label: Spinefarm Records
- Producer: Dynazty

Dynazty chronology
Sultans Of Sin (2012)	Renatus (2014)	Titanic Mass (2016)

Renatus is the fourth studio album by Swedish rock band Dynazty. The album shows a totally radical change in the sound of the band, where they leave the hard rock and embodied in a sound heavy metal with rapid and severe riffs, and flirtations with the power metal. The name means "rebirth" in Latin and describes a new phase of the band. It is also a remarkable change in their line up member, bassist Joel Fox Apelgren was replaced by Jonathan Olsson and a recent change of label, StormVox Records for the Spinefarm Records.

== Track list ==
All songs were written by Dynazty.

1. Cross The Line
2. Starlight
3. Dawn Of Your Creation
4. The Northern End
5. Incarnation
6. Run Amok
7. Unholy Deterrent
8. Sunrise In Hell
9. Salvation
10. A Divine Comedy

== Personnel ==
- Nils Molin – lead vocals
- Rob Love Magnusson – lead guitar
- George Egg – drums
- Mikael Lavér – lead guitar
- Jonathan Olsson – bass
