= Knock You Down (album) =

Studio album by Dynazty
- Released: April 20, 2011
- Recorded: 2011 - StormVox studio
- Genre: Hard rock, heavy metal
- Length: 39:20 (Original release)
- Label: StormVox Records
- Producer: Michael Vail Blum

Dynazty chronology
Bring the Thunder (2009)	Knock You Down (2011)	Sultans of Sin (2012)

Knock You Down is the second studio album from Swedish rock band Dynazty. It was the first album released from the band since signing a contract with StormVox Records. It reached number 21 on the Swedish Albums Chart. The album features a heavy sound with elements of heavy metal.

== Track listing ==
All tracks are written by Dynazty

No.	Title	Length
1.	"Sleeping With The Enemy"	3:36
2.	"New Sensation"	4:25
3.	"The Devil’s Playground"	3:04
4.	"Hunger For Love"	3:27
5.	"Get It On"	3:35
6.	"Knock You Down"	3:20
7.	"Mr. Money"	3:30
8.	"Wild Nights"	3:29
9.	"Brand New Day"	3:03
10.	"Throne Of China"	3:24
11.	"The Great Delusion"	4:20
Total length:		39:20

Bonus Scandinavian Version
No.	Title	Length
12.	"This Is My Life"	3:20
13.	"A Girl Like You"	3:48
Total length:		46:22

Bonus Japanese Version
No.	Title	Length
12.	"Too Much Is Not Enough"	3:08
13.	"One In A Million"	3:38
14.	"Stand As One"	4:19
Total length:		50:25

== Personnel ==
- Nils Molin - Vocal
- Rob Love Magnusson - Guitar
- Joel Fox Apelgren - Bass
- George Egg - Drums

== Charts ==
Chart (2011)	Peak position
Swedish Albums (Sverigetopplistan)	21
