= Land of Broken Dreams =

Single by Dynazty
- Released: 2012
- Genre: heavy metal
- Songwriter(s): Thomas G:son, Thomas "Plec" Johansson

"Land of Broken Dreams" is a song written by Thomas G:son and Thomas "Plec" Johansson, and performed by Dynazty at Melodifestivalen 2012, participating in the fourth semifinal in Malmö, successfully progressing to Andra chansen, where it was knocked out by the Top Cats song Baby Doll.

The song was tested for Svensktoppen on 11 and 18 March 2012, but failed to enter that chart.

== Charts ==
Chart (2012)	Peak position
Sweden (Sverigetopplistan)	57
