= Toei Kyoto Studio Park =

Theme park and film set in Kyoto, Japan

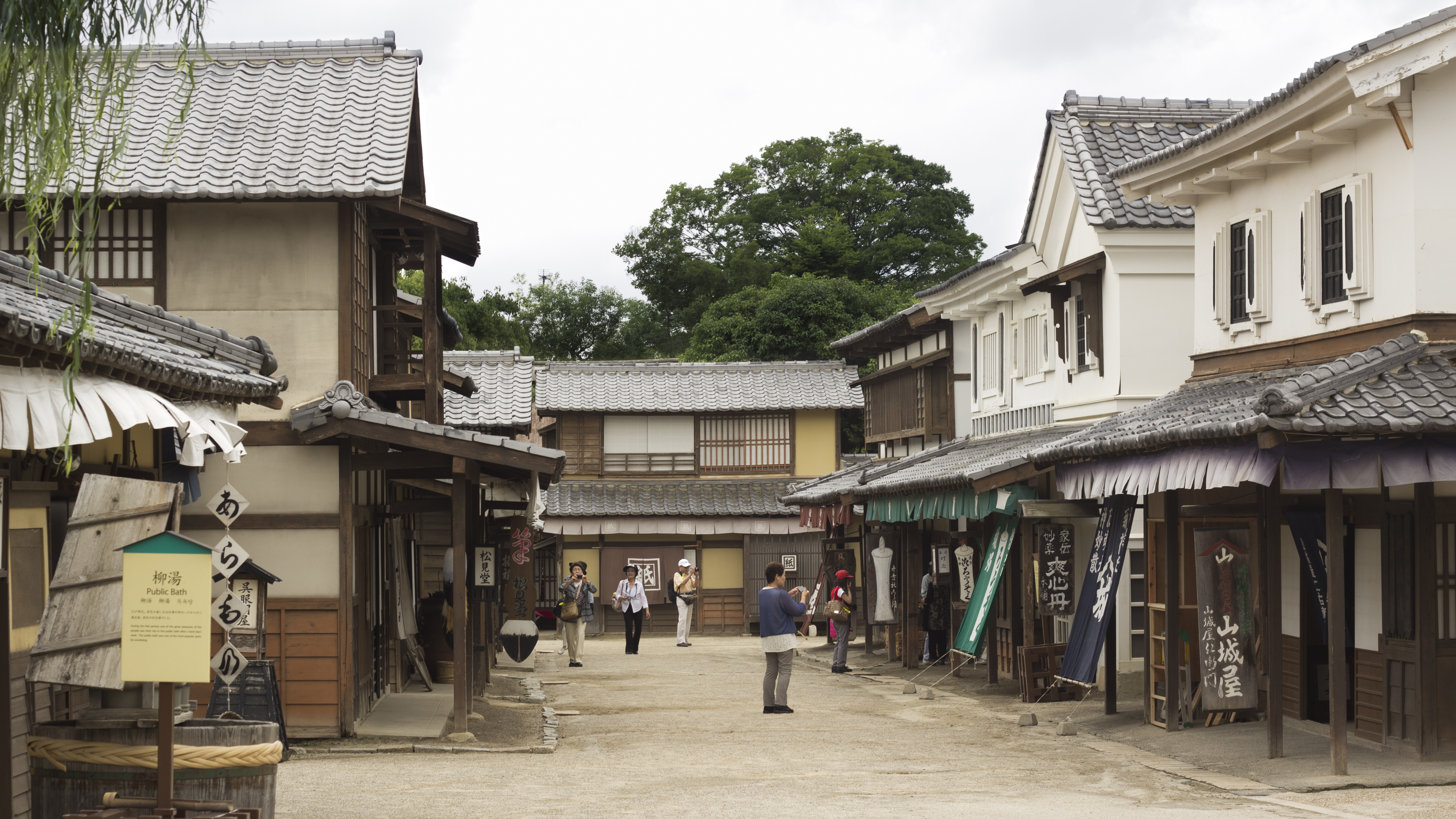
- Interactive map of Toei Kyoto Studio Park
- Location: Ukyo-ku, Kyoto, Japan
- Coordinates: 35.016°N 135.708°E
- Opened: November 1, 1975
- Operated by: Toei Kyoto Studio Co., Ltd.
- Theme: Jidaigeki, Toei Company and Toei Animation's works
- Attendance: 860,000
- Area: 5.3 ha (13 acres)
- Website: www.toei-eigamura.com/en/

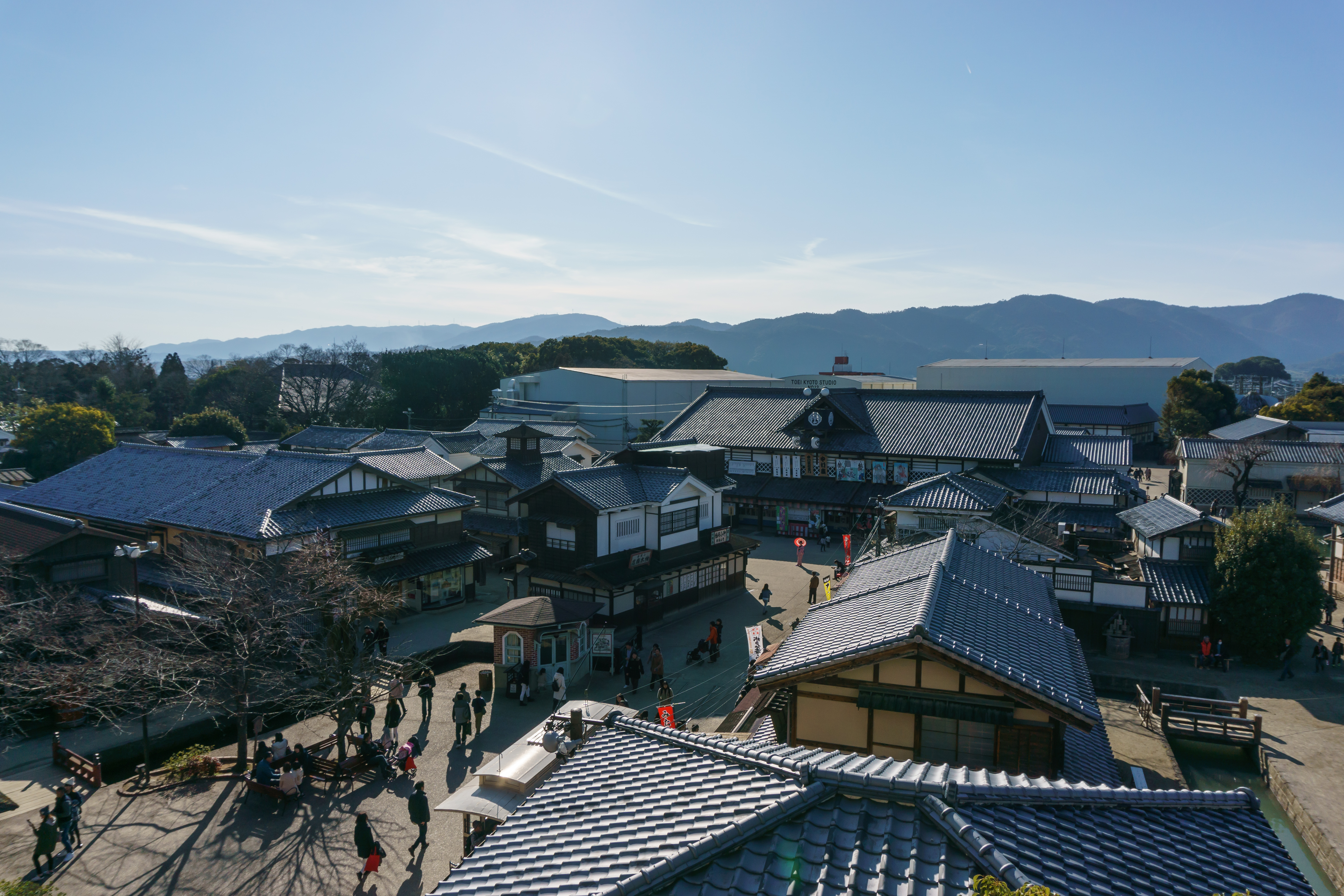
A view from above the park's entrance

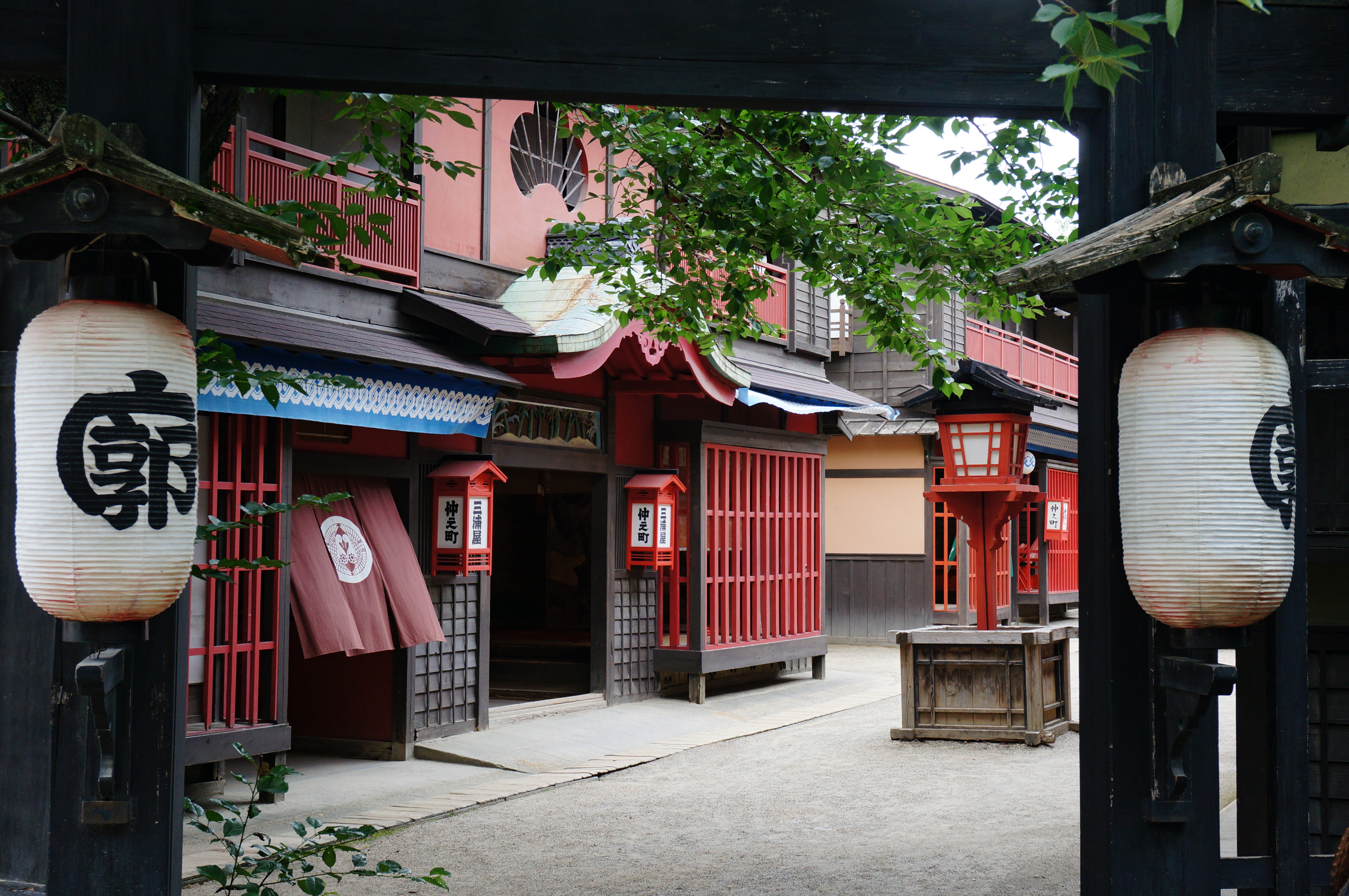
Miura-ya, a replica of a geisha teahouse

Toei Kyoto Studio Park (東映太秦映画村, Tōei Uzumasa Eigamura), also known as Usumaza Kyoto Village, is a film set and theme park in Kyoto, Japan. It opened in 1975. It is situated in Toei Company's Kyoto Studio where numerous period dramas have been filmed. Visitors are occasionally able to watch the filming of TV shows and movies.

The park is designed to replicate an Edo period village, with costumed actors, themed restaurants, and traditional-style buildings. The actors at the park are often real period drama actors. Seizō Fukumoto, who starred in numerous period dramas (including The Last Samurai), was a performer at the park.

Visitors are encouraged, but not required, to dress in kimono or other traditional clothes. Guests can rent kimono and period costumes in the park.

== History ==
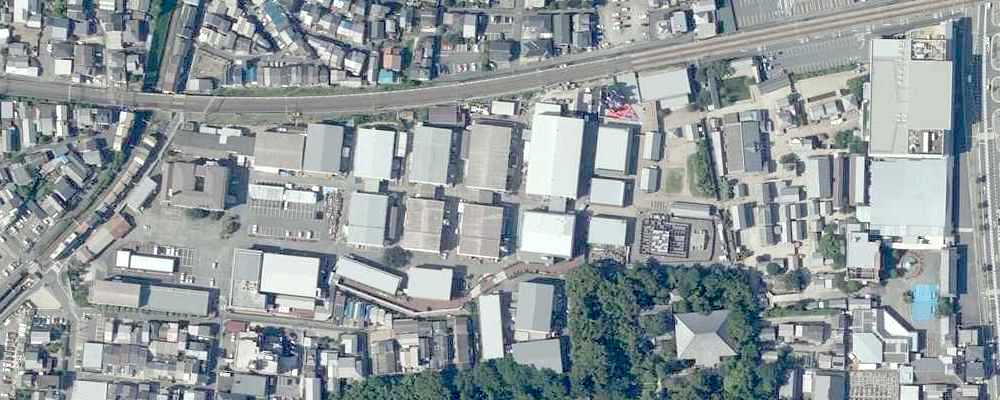
Aerial photograph of Toei Kyoto Studio Park and Toei Kyoto Studios

A film studio has existed on the site since 1926, when actor Tsumasaburō Bandō opened his own film studio there. The site changed hands several times before being acquired by Toei in 1951 as Toei Kyoto Studio.

The decision to open the studio to the public was one born of desparation. Yakuza movies and period dramas were declining in popularity, leaving Toei's Kyoto studios with dire financial prospects. Opening the studio to the public was a "last ditch effort" devised by the then head of the studio Tan Takaiwa. The site was first opened as a theme park on 1 November 1975 and drew over 70,000 visitors in the first three days, effectively saving the Kyoto studio.

In 2020, the park opened Evangelion Kyoto Base, which is based on the anime franchise Neon Genesis Evangelion. The main attraction is a 15-meter statue of the EVA-01's upper body, with visitors able to have their photos taken inside the Entry Plug and on the Evangelion's right hand.

In 2023, Toei announced the park was to undergo major refurbishment in a bid to attract more adult guests and overseas tourists. The first phase of renovations was scheduled for completion in 2025 to mark 50 years since the park opened. The site briefly closed on 24 February 2026 to prepare for the first phase, before re-opening to the public on 28 March 2026. The second phase is scheduled to be completed in 2027 and there are plans for a third phase to open on an unspecified date. The park was rebranded as Usumasa Kyoto Village and the closing time was extended from 17:00 to 21:00.

Among the new adult-oriented attractions is an area where guests can play the traditional gambling dice game chō-han, (Note: Owing to Japan's strict gambling laws, guests do not play with money and instead just play for fun.) and an exhibit where guests can undergo a simulated historical interrogation. Both new attractions are only for those aged 18 years and over.

== Attractions ==
=== Shows and events ===
- 360° Real-time Drama "The Cherry Blossom Banquet Featuring a Japanese Traditional Bridal Procession"(360°リアルタイムドラマ「花嫁道中 桜の宴」)
- Ninja show "NINJA MISSION" (忍者ショー「NINJA MISSION」)
- Japanese Casino (18+)(丁半博打)
- The House of Torture (18+)(大人しか入れない拷問屋敷)
- Samurai DOJO(侍修練場)
- Hanafuda Fortune Telling(京花占い)
- Village Guide Tour(ガイドツアー～映画村のまにまに～)
- Kyoto Asobi: Step Into The World of Ukiyo-e(浮世ノ京あそび)
- 100 Years of Uzumasa's Jidaigeki: Behind the Scenes of Period Dramas(太秦撮影所創設記念「太秦時代劇100年」〜撮影バックストーリー〜)

=== Attractions ===
- Ninja Escape Room（からくり忍者屋敷）
- The Most Terrifying Haunted House（史上最恐のお化け屋敷）
- NINJA BATTLE—Uzumasa Demon Clash—（NINJA BATTLE－ 太秦鬼決戦 －）
- 3D Maze: The Ninja Fort（立体迷路 忍者の砦）
- Ninja Climbing -SHINOBORI-（天空クライミング 忍登(しのぼり)）
- Shuriken Dojo（手裏剣道場）
- Kyudojo （矢場）
- Evangelion Kyoto Base（エヴァンゲリオン京都基地）
- Toei Characters Costume Photo Studio（キャラクターなりきり写真）

=== Cultural experiences ===
- Tea ceremony
- Flower arranging
- Noh
- Kyōgen
- Kyōmai (traditional Kyoto-style dancing)
- Shamisen
- Ohayashi

== As a filming location ==
Numerous projects have been filmed at the park, including:

- Rashomon (1950)
- Ugetsu (1953)
- Gate of Hell (1953)
- Bushido, Samurai Saga (1963)
- The music video for Sebastiano Serafini's "Inori" (2015)
- Kokuho (2025)

== Gallery ==
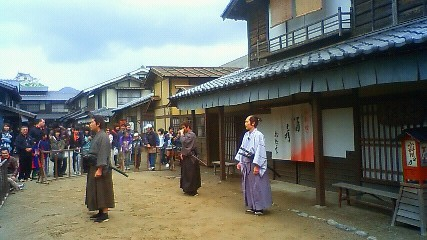
Shooting taking place on an open set in the park

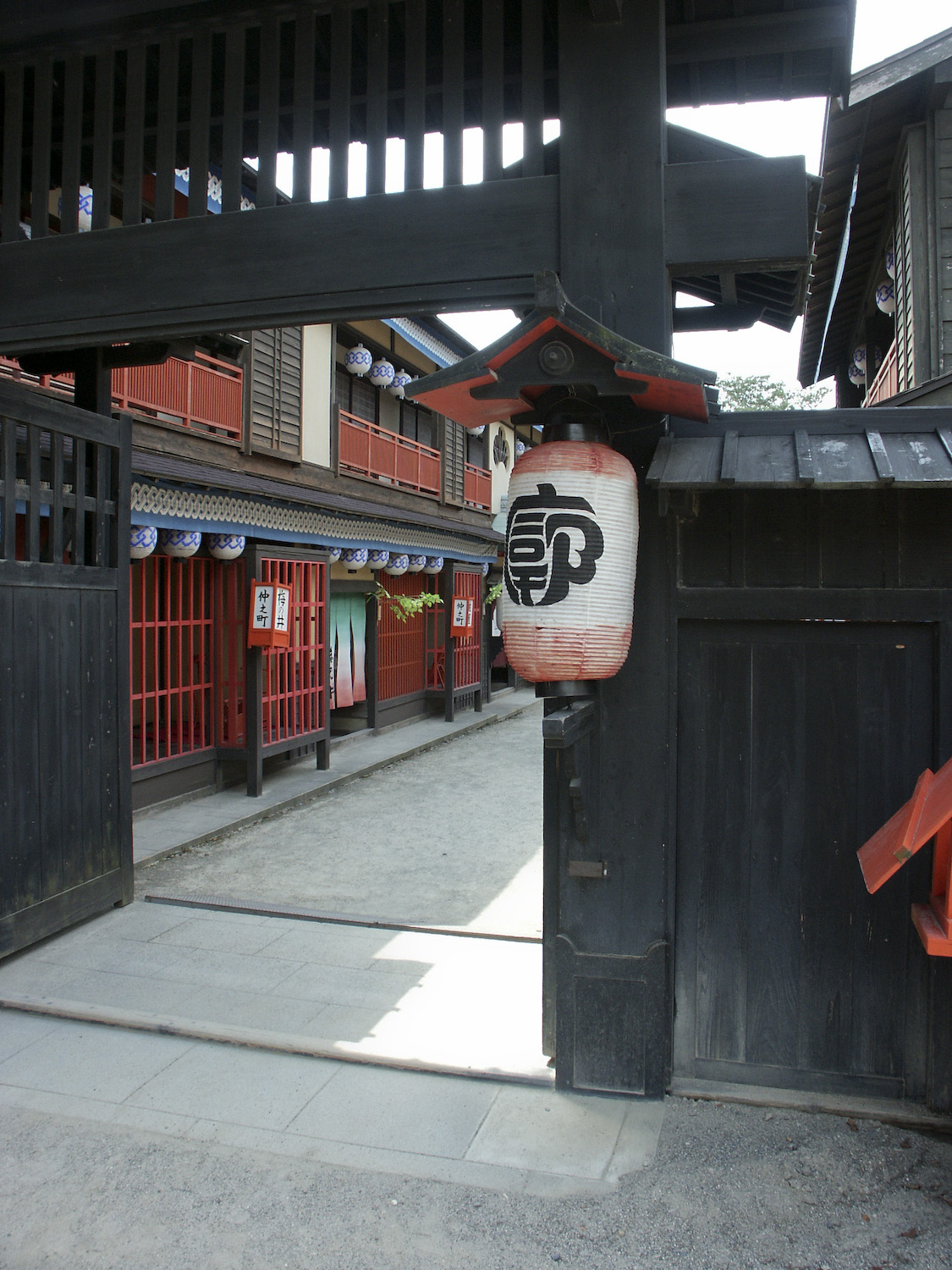
Yoshiwara street

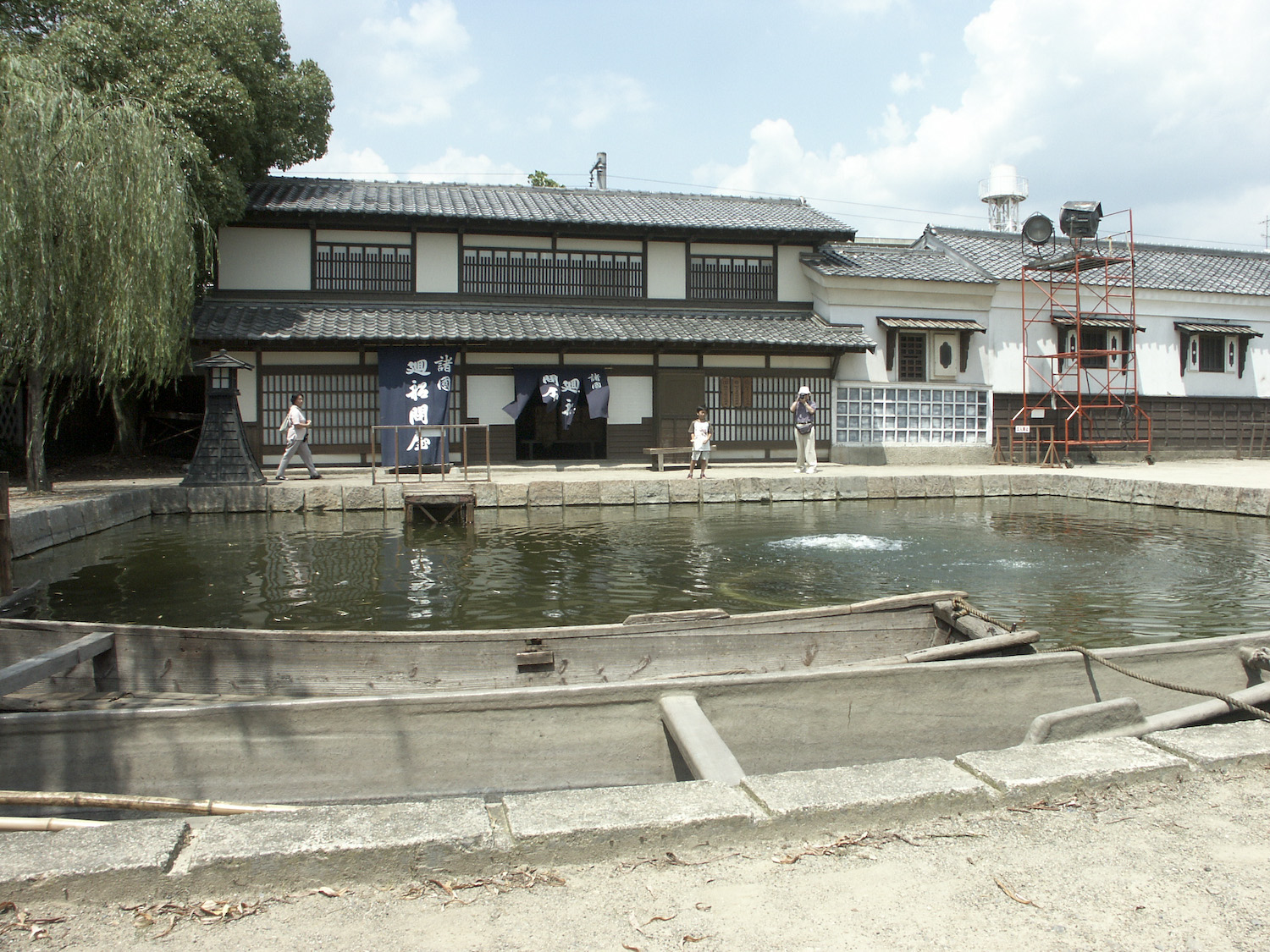
Harbor-town Chidori

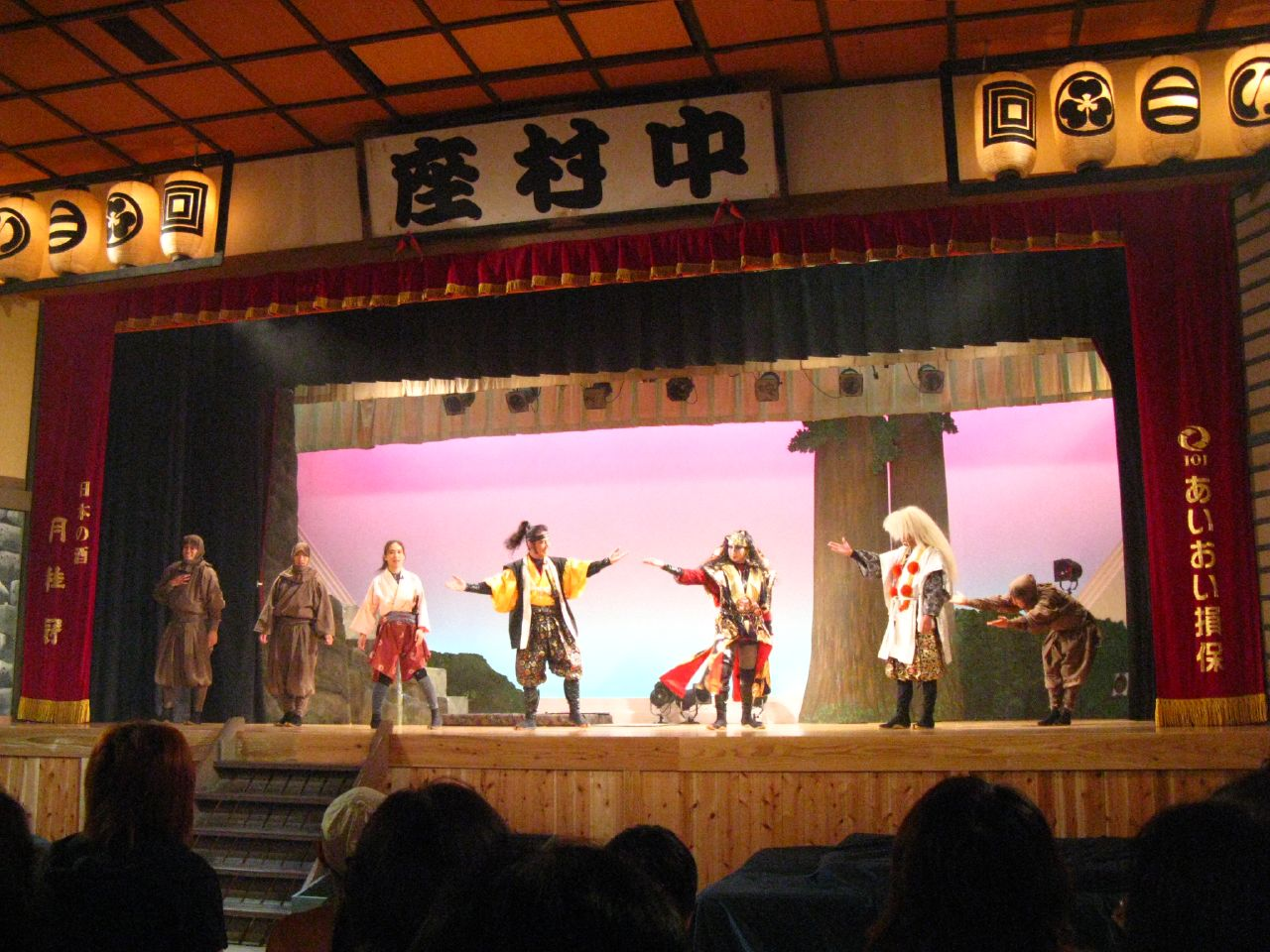
Nakamura-za theatre (now defunct)

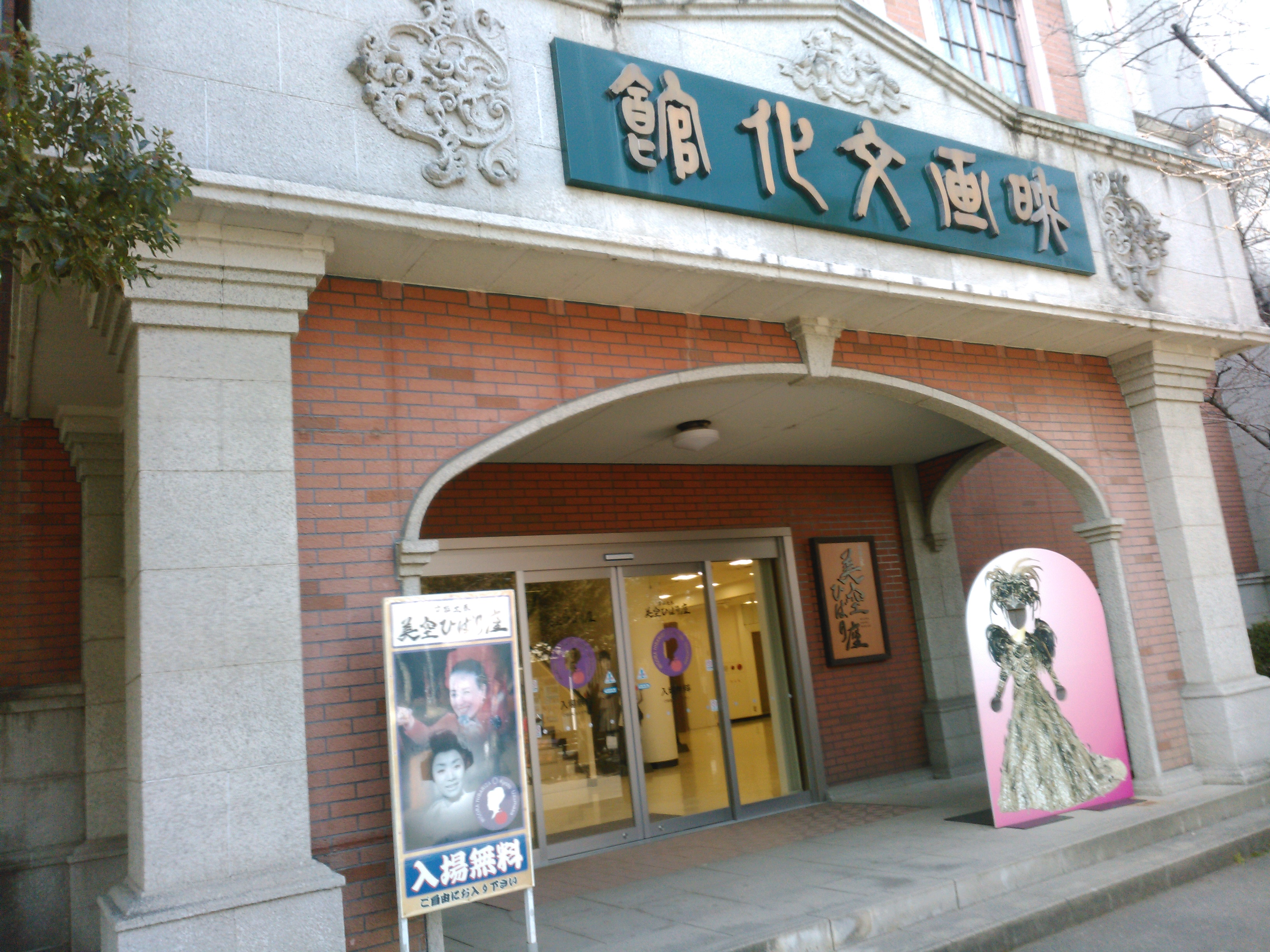
Entrance to the cinema museum (closed since 7 April 2024 for refurbishment)

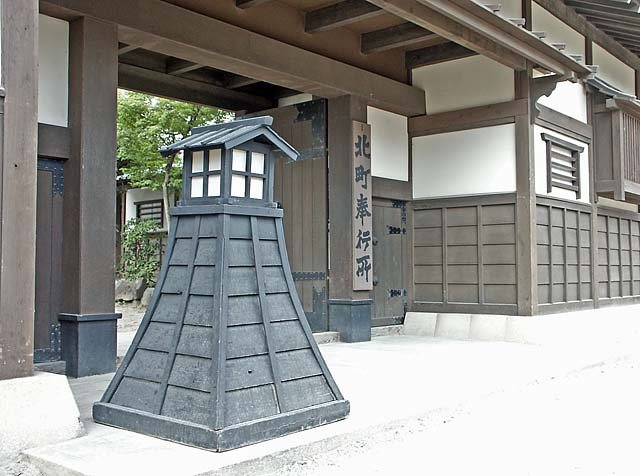
Kitamachi Magistrates' Office

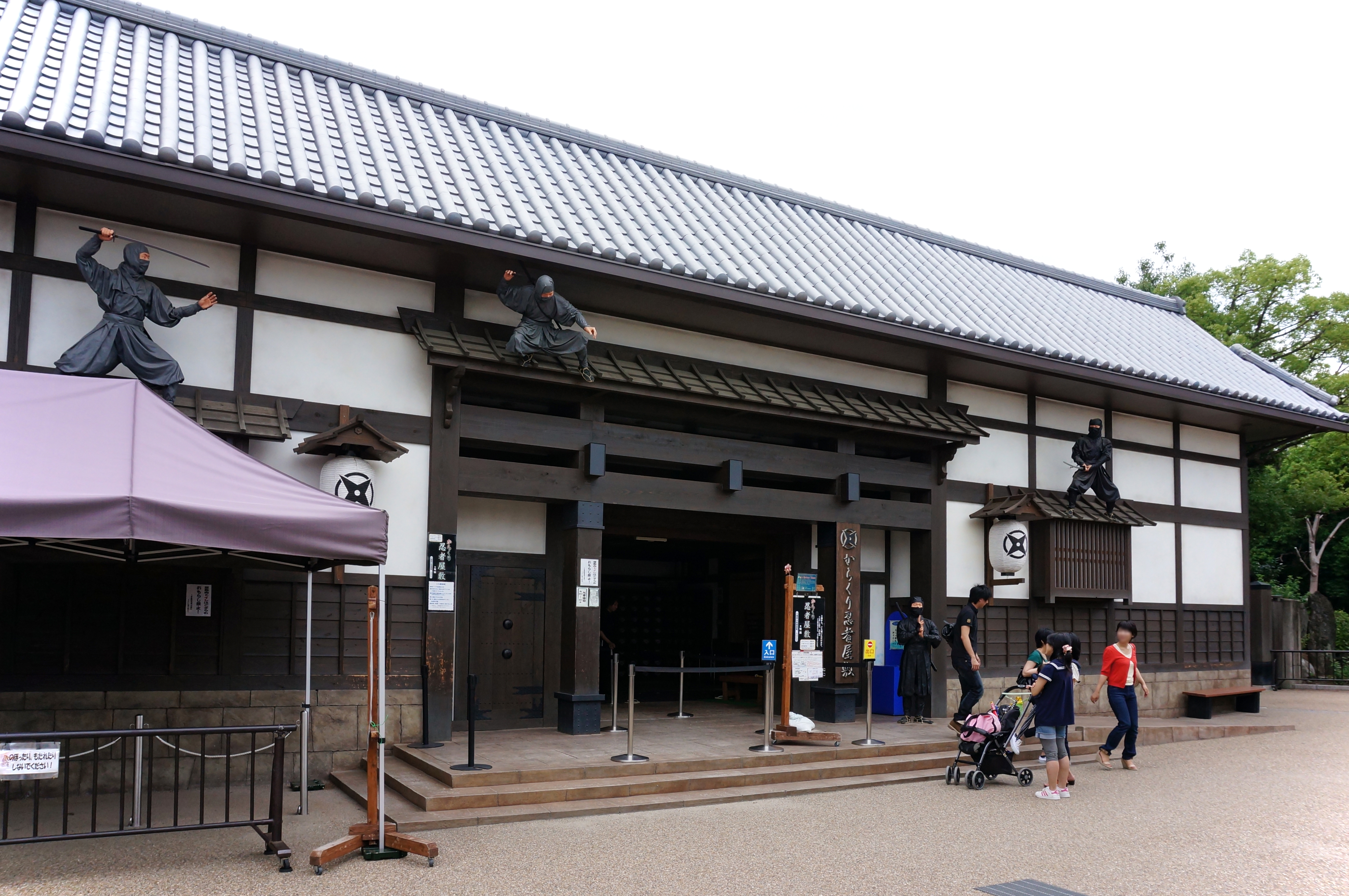
"Ninja House Escape Room"

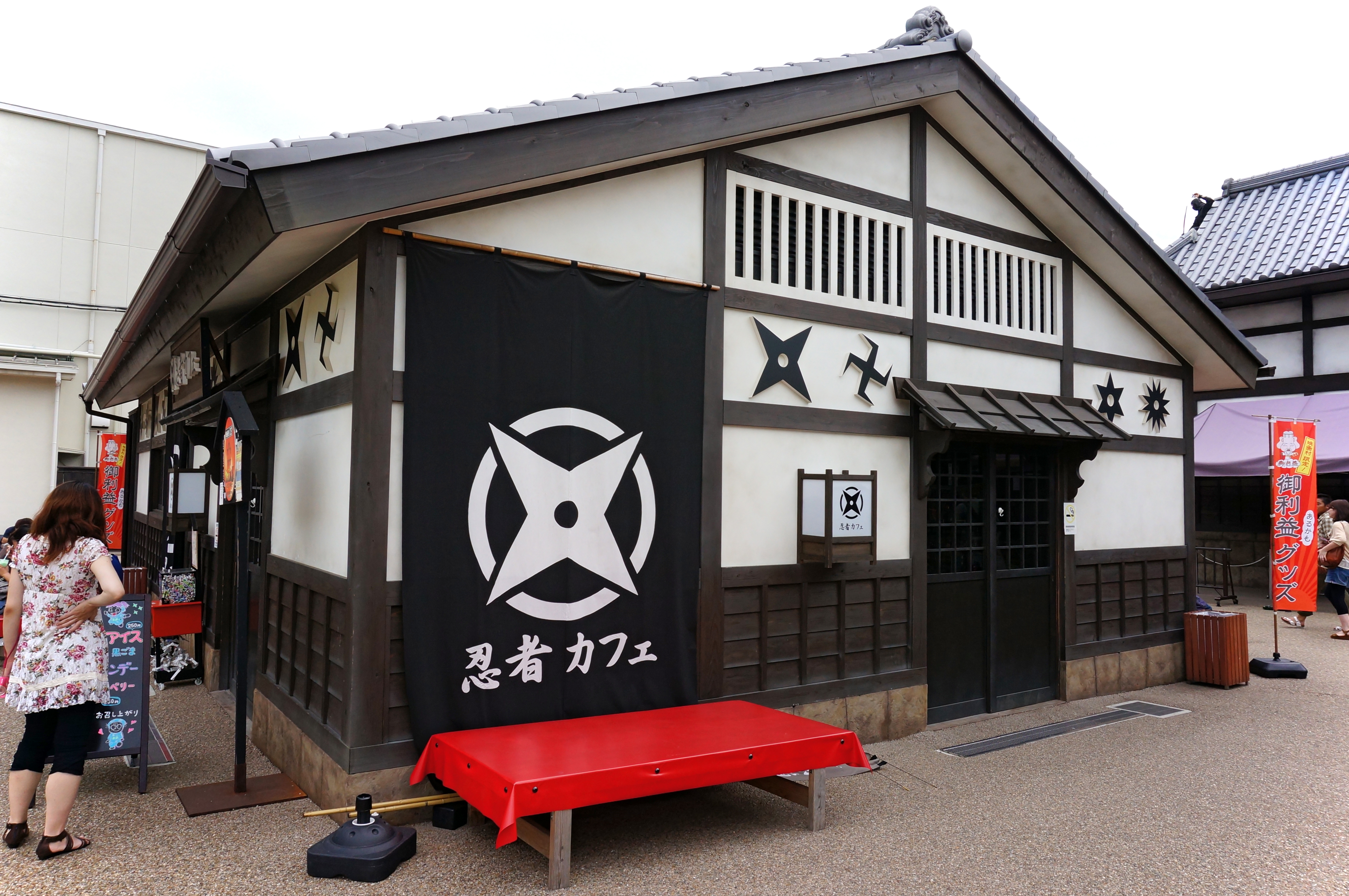
Ninja Café

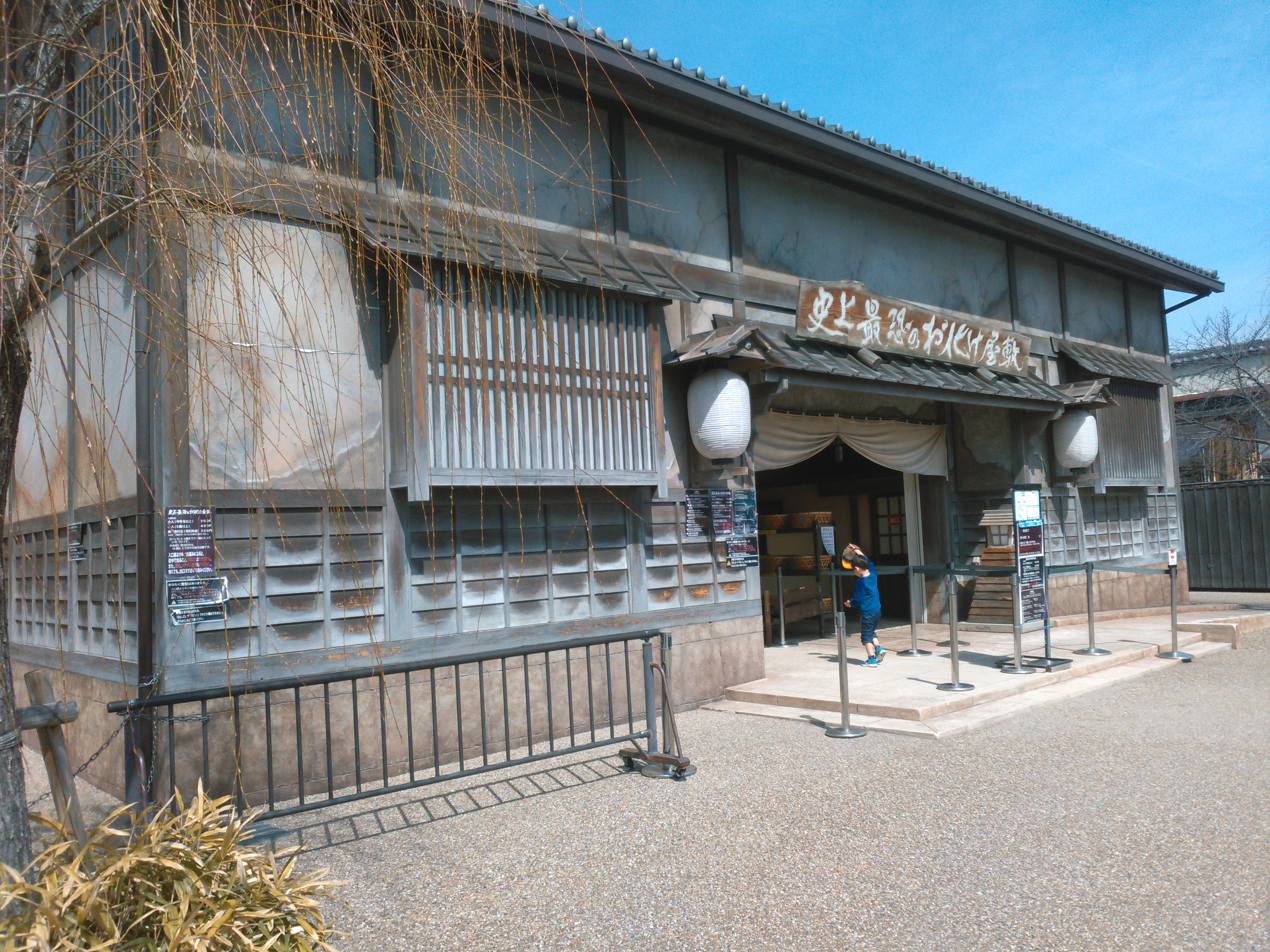
"The Most Terrifying Haunted House"
