= ToyZ =

Studio album by Cinema Bizarre
- Released: August 21, 2009
- Recorded: 2008–2009
- Genres: Glam rock New wave Synthpop
- Length: 1:17:35
- Label: MCA Music, Inc.
- Producer: Cinema Bizarre

Cinema Bizarre chronology
Final Attraction (2007)	ToyZ (2009)	BANG! (2009)

Alternative cover

Singles from ToyZ
- 1. "I Came 2 Party feat. Space Cowboy" Released: August 7, 2009; 2. "My Obsession" Released: November 27, 2009

ToyZ is the second and final studio album by German glam rock band Cinema Bizarre. After their debut album, Final Attraction was a moderate hit, they began working on their second studio album. The first single from the album is called "I Came 2 Party," featuring Space Cowboy. Originally the first single was to be a song entitled "My Obsession," however this release was canceled due to fans taking advantage of a mistake on the part of iTunes. When the single was put up two days too early, fans were able to download the track and the song quickly spread, resulting in an announcement from the band that "I Came 2 Party" would be released instead. The album release date was also postponed until mid-August. "My Obsession" was later released as the second single from the album.

On February 23, 2026, Strify, via his YouTube channel, released two unreleased demos from the album that didn't make the final cut. The first was called "Stay" and the second, "Human Nature (Let Bodies Talk)."

== Singles ==
"I Came 2 Party" was confirmed to be the first single from the album, in the place of previously announced single "My Obsession." "I Came 2 Party" released in Europe on August 7, 2009, and on August 11, worldwide. "My Obsession" was eventually released as the album's second single.

== Track listing ==
=== Standard Edition ===
CD
No.	Title	Length
1.	"Le Generique"	1:19
2.	"Touching and Kissing"	3:36
3.	"I Came 2 Party (with Space Cowboy)"	3:25
4.	"Deeper and Deeper"	3:27
5.	"Erase and Replace"	4:16
6.	"My Obsession"	3:57
7.	"Je ne regrette rien"	3:24
8.	"Dark Star"	3:20
9.	"Toyz"	3:40
10.	"In Your Cage"	4:11
11.	"Heaven Is Wrapped in Chains"	3:23
12.	"Hypnotized by Jane"	3:48
13.	"Blasphemy"	4:08
14.	"I Don't Wanna Know (If U Got Laid)"	3:23
15.	"Out of Love"	3:35
16.	"Sad Day (For Happiness)"	3:48
17.	"Tears in Vegas"	3:57
18.	"Le Generique de fin"	1:15

=== Deluxe edition ===
In addition to the tracks above, the deluxe edition also features a bonus disc containing the following songs:

CD 2
No.	Title	Length
1.	"American Beauty"	3:42
2.	"Modern Lover"	3:52
3.	"Bang a Gong (Get It On)"	3:18
4.	"Are You Crying?"	4:51

== Charts ==
Chart (2009)	Peak position
Austrian Albums Chart	44
Dutch Albums Top 100	94
French Albums Chart	79
German Albums Chart	24

== Release history ==
Region	Date	Format
Germany	August 21, 2009	CD, digital download
United Kingdom	September 8, 2009	CD, digital download

== Promotion ==
Cinema Bizarre was playing European shows on their "We're All ToyZ" tour to promote the album. However, in January 2010, the band announced that it was discontinuing work as Cinema Bizarre.
