= Cinema Bizarre =

German glam rock band

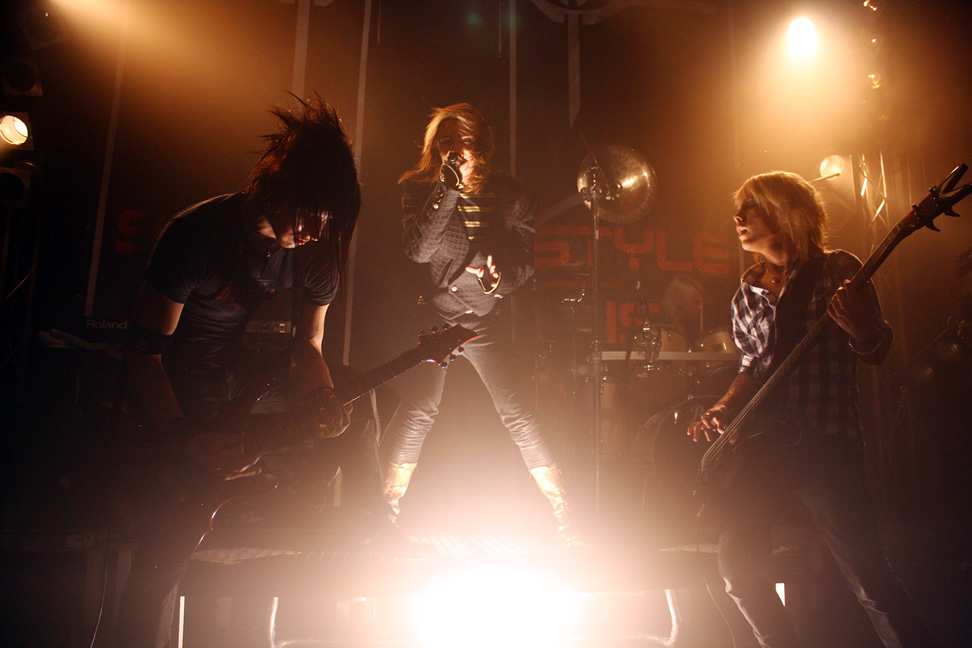
- Cinema Bizarre during a concert in Hamburg

Background information
- Origin: Berlin, Germany
- Genres: Glam rock; indie rock; synthpop; alternative rock
- Years active: 2005–2010
- Labels: MCA Music, Inc. Cherrytree US
- Past members: Strify; Shin; Yu; Kiro; Romeo; Luminor

Cinema Bizarre was a German glam rock band from Berlin. They released their debut album in 2007. Their manager was Eric Burton and for a while Lacrimosa singer and songwriter Tilo Wolff After and during the tour with Lady Gaga was Mattia Rissone in 2009.

Cinema Bizarre has sold more than 1.5 million records worldwide.

== Members ==
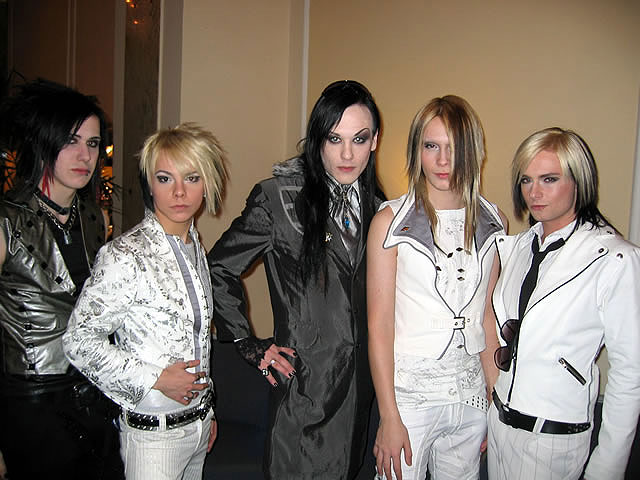
Cinema Bizarre, from left: Yu, Kiro, Luminor, Shin, Strify

- Strify (Andreas Eduard Hudec) (born 20 August 1988) – vocals
- Kiro (Carsten Schaefer) (born 11 January 1988) – bass
- Yu (Hannes de Buhr) (born 29 December 1988) – guitar
- Shin (Marcel Gothow) (born 12 December 1989) – drums
- Luminor (Lars Falkowsky) (born 22 March 1985 – died 12 April 2020) – keyboard and backing vocals
- Romeo (Tobias Kohl) (born 4 August 1985) – keyboard

== History ==
Their debut single "Lovesongs (They Kill Me)" was released on 14 September 2007, two weeks after their first live performance in the German music show The Dome.

They released their debut studio album, Final Attraction, in 2007. This is the only album to feature keyboardist and backing vocalist Luminor. Three singles were released from the album: "Lovesongs (They Kill Me)", "Escape to the Stars", and "Forever or Never". The album was released in several European countries.

On 28 March 2008, they began their first tour throughout Europe. In September 2008 Luminor took a break from going on tour with the band. It was announced that his health was poor and he needed time off in order to get better. While he was on break, a friend of Yu traveled and played with the band.

The Norddeutscher Rundfunk (North German television broadcast) nominated the band for the national final of the Eurovision Song Contest 2008. No Angels and Carolin Fortenbacher, made it into the second election round of the final, leaving Cinema Bizarre behind.

On 1 November 2008, a trailer was released which stated the name of Cinema Bizarre's second album to be Toyz.

On 27 November 2008, Luminor announced that he was leaving the band. Romeo, who previously took over Lummox's part on tour, eventually replaced him as keyboardist for the band.

In 2009, with Mattia Rissone Cinema Bizarre toured through North America as opening act for Lady GaGa. on her The Fame Ball Tour.

Initially, the first single was to be "My Obsession", which Strify described to be a 'powerful ballad'. However, the song leaked early online and the album release date was pushed back from May to 21 August. On their official website, they announced that their first American album was going to be titled "Bang!". The first single from the albums ToyZ and BANG! was announced to be "I Came 2 Party", a duet with Space Cowboy.

"My Obsession" was chosen to be the second single from Toyz and BANG! and was accompanied by two different versions of the music video one was compose by Mattia Rissone during the tour in 2009.

In 2009 Cinema Bizarre won an EBBA Award. Every year the European Border Breakers Awards recognise the success of ten emerging artists or groups who reached audiences outside their own countries with their first internationally released album in the past year.

On 21 January 2010 the band announced via MySpace that they were taking a break, as they felt that it was "time to start something new."

== Post-Cinema Bizarre ==
Strify started going by the name Jack Strify and released a new version of their song "Blasphemy" as a featured artist with French DJ Junior Caldera in June 2011. He later announced that he would be releasing a solo album. In 2012, three music videos have been published on his YouTube channel as a trilogy entitled "GLITTER + DIRT", including the songs "Brave New World", "Sanctuary" and "HALO (We're The Only One)" which were eventually released on his first EP Glitter + Dirt in August 2013. On 1 August 2014 he announced the name of his first album to be called ILLUSION and launched a crowdfunding campaign to finish the album. Teasers were posted throughout the campaign and on 30 November 2014 his album was released through the crowdfunding partner PledgeMusic. The album was released through Membran Music worldwide on 24 April 2015, proceeded by the digital single release "Burn/Fear" and "Lovers When It's Cold" on 2 April 2015.

On 11 November 2011, Yu Phoenix (guitarist) released a new single on iTunes named "Moonflower" which features J'Lostein. Later on, in January 2012 he announced a new band project with Sebastiano Serafini called "Monochrome Hearts". A preview for the first single has been released on their YouTube Channel. In January 2013, Monochrome Hearts debuted their first full single, Your Knight, on iTunes and amazon. The second single, When the Night Kills the Day was released on Amazon and iTunes on 13 July 2013. In October 2013, Yu Phoenix also joined the band DNR (Dreams Not Reality) as the new guitarist. Phoenix released that he was starting a new project entitled Everyze with singer David Baßin from the metal band Victorius.

== Luminor's departure ==
From September 2008 onwards, Luminor had been absent at a few concerts and Yu's closest friend, Romeo, temporarily helped out in Luminor's place. On 27 November 2008 Luminor announced on his MySpace profile that he had to leave Cinema Bizarre. He said this departure was due to health issues and unresolvable inner conflicts. In his statement, he briefly said that his condition had worsened, he was not able to continue participating in the band, and it was a private issue. Eventually, Romeo permanently took over for Luminor as keyboardist.

Luminor came back to the stage in 2010 with the Italian band DNR (Dreams Not Reality) for a featuring during their European tour, and again in 2013 together with the Italian singer Roberto Romagnoli.

Luminor died from an accidental overdose in April 2020.

== Discography ==
=== Albums ===
Year	Title	Chart position						Certifications (sales thresholds)
Year	Title	GER	AUT	FRA	IT	US	NET	Certifications (sales thresholds)
2007	Final Attraction: Debut studio album; Released: 12 October 2007; Label: Island Records	9	28	24	48	-	-	RUS certification: Gold; Sales: 500,000
2009	ToyZ: Second studio album; Released: 21 August 2009; Label: Island Records	24	44	54	31	-	94	
2009	BANG!^{1}: Debut U.S. album; Released: 25 August 2009; Label: Cherrytree Records	-	-	-	-	-	-	

1: released only in Canada and the U.S.

=== Singles ===
Year	Title	Chart position				Album
Year	Title	GER	AUT	FRA	EU	Album
2007	"Lovesongs (They Kill Me)"	9	32	28	35	Final Attraction
2007	"Escape to the Stars"	36	61	-	-	Final Attraction
2008	"Forever or Never"	44	71	-	-	Final Attraction
2009	"I Came 2 Party"	32	71	-	-	ToyZ and BANG!
2009	My Obsession	-	-	-	-	ToyZ and BANG!
