= Lovesongs (They Kill Me) =

Single by Cinema Bizarre

from the album Final Attraction
- Released: September 14, 2007
- Genre: Glam rock
- Length: 3:44
- Label: Island
- Songwriters: Christian Neander, Michelle Leonard, Kiko Masbaum
- Producers: Ingo Politz, Bernd Wendlandt, Brix

Cinema Bizarre singles chronology
| "Lovesongs (They Kill Me)" (2007) | "Escape To The Stars" (2007) |

"Lovesongs (They Kill Me)" is a glam rock song by German band Cinema Bizarre, from their debut album Final Attraction. The song hit #9 on the German Hot 100, making it their highest charting single to date.

== Track listing ==
These are the formats and track listings of major single releases of "Lovesongs (They Kill Me)".

CD Single

1. "Lovesongs (They Kill Me)" – 3:44
2. "Escape To The Stars (Rough Edge Mix)" – 4:13

CD Maxi

1. "Lovesongs (They Kill Me)" – 3:44
2. "She Waits For Me" – 3:13
3. "Lovesongs (They Kill Me) (Kyau & Albert Remix)" – 6:36
4. "Lovesongs (They Kill Me) (Instrumental)" – 3:44

Cardboard CD Single

1. "Lovesongs (They Kill Me) (Album Version)" – 3:44
2. "Lovesongs (They Kill Me) (Hot Like Me, Freak Like Me Club Mix)" - 6:19
3. "Lovesongs (They Kill Me) (Extended Remix)" - 6:41
4. "Lovesongs (They Kill Me) (IAMX Remix)" - 4:52

== Chart performance ==
"Lovesongs (They Kill Me)" has been listed for 36 weeks in three different charts. Its first appearance was week 38/2007 in the Austria Singles Top 75 and the last appearance was week 35/2008 in the France Singles Top 100. Its peak position was number 9, on the Germany Singles Top 100, it stayed there for one week. Its highest entry was number 9 in the Germany Singles Top 100.

== Charts ==
=== Weekly charts ===
| Chart (2007–08) | Peak position |
|---|---|
| Austria (Ö3 Austria Top 40) | 32 |
| Belgium (Ultratip Bubbling Under Wallonia) | 17 |
| CIS Airplay (TopHit) | 47 |
| France (SNEP) | 28 |
| Germany (GfK) | 9 |
| Russia Airplay (TopHit) | 48 |
| Ukraine Airplay (TopHit) | 108 |

=== Year-end charts ===
| Chart (2008) | Position |
|---|---|
| CIS (Tophit) | 128 |
| Russia Airplay (TopHit) | 150 |
