= I Came 2 Party =

Single by Cinema Bizarre featuring Space Cowboy

from the album ToyZ, BANG! and Digital Rock Star
- Released: August 7, 2009
- Genre: Electropop
- Length: 3:27
- Label: Island
- Songwriters: Martin Kierszenbaum, RedOne, Nick Dresti
- Producers: RedOne, Space Cowboy, Martin Kierszenbaum

"I Came 2 Party" is a song by German band Cinema Bizarre. It features Space Cowboy and was written and produced by Martin Kierszenbaum, RedOne and Space Cowboy, for the band's second studio album ToyZ (2009) and debut U.S. album, BANG!. The track was released as the album's lead single on August 7, 2009, throughout German-speaking Europe and on August 11, 2009 worldwide. The song is also included on Space Cowboy's fourth studio album, Digital Rock Star. The Paradiso Girls version of the song was also featured in the "San Vicente" episode of TV series Melrose Place.

== Track listing ==
These are the formats and track listings of major single releases of "I Came 2 Party".

U.S. Digital Download

1. "I Came 2 Party" – 3:27

CD maxi

1. "I Came 2 Party" – 3:27
2. "I Came 2 Party" (Michael Mind remix) – 5:37
3. "I Came 2 Party" (mobile edit) – 0:47

2-Track CD single

1. "I Came 2 Party" – 3:27
2. "I Came 2 Party" (Michael Mind Remix) – 5:37

Digital EP

1. "I Came 2 Party" – 3:27
2. "I Came 2 Party" (Michael Mind remix) – 5:37
3. "I Came 2 Party" (T.Raumschmiere remix) - 7:04
4. "I Came 2 Party" (mobile edit) – 0:47

== Credits and personnel ==
- Strify:— Vocals,
- Space Cowboy:— producer, vocals, writer
- Kiro:— bass
- Yu:— guitarist
- Shin:— drums
- Romeo:— keyboard

== Remixes and other versions ==
Cinema Bizarre

1. "I Came 2 Party" (album version) – 3:27
2. "I Came 2 Party" (video version) - 3:38
3. "I Came 2 Party" (Michael Mind remix) – 5:37
4. "I Came 2 Party" (T.Raumschmiere remix) - 7:04
5. "I Came 2 Party" (Jump Smokers remix) – 3:36
6. "I Came 2 Party" (mobile edit) – 0:47

Paradiso Girls

1. "I Came 2 Party" (album version) – 3:36
2. "I Came 2 Party" (DJ Dan radio edit) – 3:27
3. "I Came 2 Party" (DJ Dan club mix) – 6:24
4. "I Came 2 Party" (Starkillers remix) – 7:46
5. "I Came 2 Party" (Jump Smokers remix) – 3:36
6. "I Came 2 Party" (Jump Smokers dub) – 3:36
7. "I Came 2 Party" (Discotech remix) – 4:30
8. "I Came 2 Party" (David Garcia remix) – 5:07

== Charts ==
Chart (2009)	Peak position
Austrian Singles Chart	71
German Singles Chart	32

== Release history ==
Region	Date	Format
Germany	August 7, 2009	CD single
Worldwide	August 11, 2009	Digital download
