= Perris Records =

Record label

- Parent company: RockNation
- Founded: 1993
- Founder: Tom Mathers
- Status: Active
- Distributor(s): Plastic Head Music (UK); Select-O-Hits (USA); GOI Music (Spain); Andromeda (Italy); ZYX Music (Europe)
- Genre: Rock; hard rock; heavy metal; glam metal; AOR; melodic rock
- Country of origin: Texas, USA
- Location: Houston
- Official website: www.perrisrecords.com

Perris Records is an American record label that focuses on heavy metal and all its less-known categories, such as glam rock, hair metal, sleaze rock and hard rock in general.

== History ==
Perris Records was founded by rock musician Tom Mathers in Houston (Texas, USA) in the early 1990s. With his hard rock band Cherry St. signed with JRS/BMG to release "Squeeze It Dry". JRS records had The Stray Cats and Asia on their roster. After the band broke up he decided in 1993 to found his own music label.

A number of well-known rock bands, who survived the crisis period of the early 1990s, caused by the shift in musical taste from hard rock to grunge, gradually started to work with Perris Records. At the start of the new millennium, this publishing house drew in a new generation of hard rock bands and musicians. Perris Records has thus become a specific record label of this minority musical style and of its fans around the world, from the late 90s to the present day. In 2005 Perris Records opened new office in Europe, based in Copenhagen, Denmark.

From 2006 to 2009, Perris Records published every two months in paper form the magazine Rocknation, given out in 100,000 copies free of charge in more than 750 music stores in the United States. Currently it is only published in the online version.

Rocknation TV was a 30-minute television show focusing on music videos and interviews with artists, which until 2009 was broadcast on Time Warner Cable television in 250 of America's largest cities. A total of 55 episodes were shot.

== Bands and artists who collaborate with Perris records ==
- Bang Tango
- Beverly Killz
- Big Cock
- Black 'N Blue
- Bruce Kulick
- BulletBoys
- Captain Mendess
- Cinderella
- Cherry St.
- Danger Danger
- Dangerous Toys
- Dreams Now Reality
- Enuff Z'Nuff
- Europe
- Every Mother's Nightmare
- George Lynch
- Gilby Clarke
- Heaven's Edge
- Helix
- Jetboy
- Keel
- Kristy Majors
- L.A. Guns
- Leatherwolf
- Loud N Nasty
- Love/Hate
- Michael Angelo Batio
- Michael Sweet
- Nasty Idols
- Odin
- Pretty Boy Floyd
- Razamanaz
- Roxx
- Roxx Gang
- Steevi Jaimz
- Stephen Pearcy
- Stryper
- Vain
- Vicious Rumors
- Warrant
- Zan Clan
